= List of awards and nominations received by Residente =

Residente awards and nominations
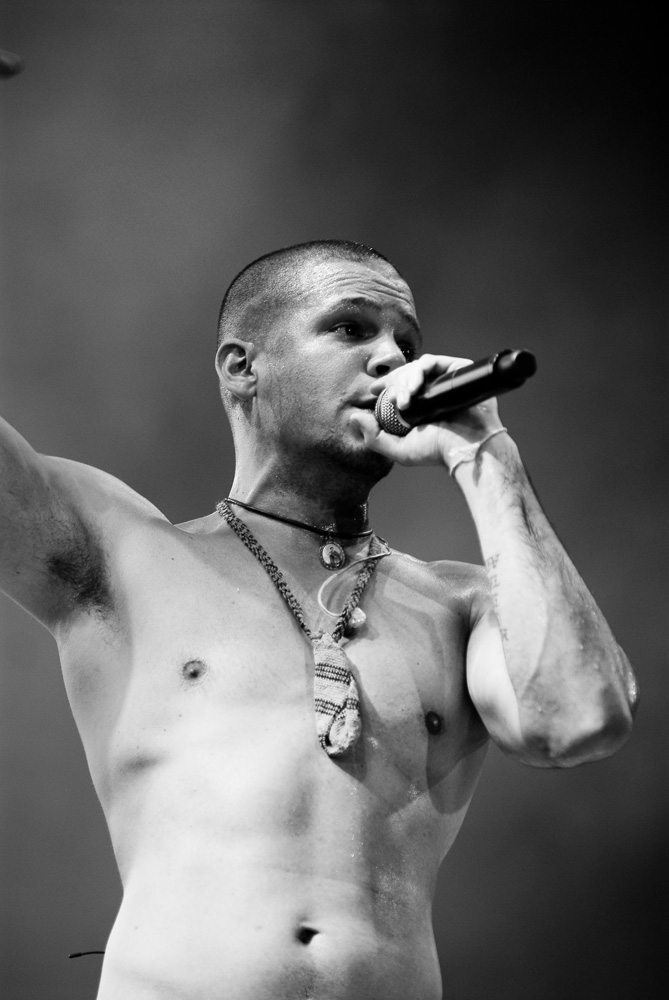
- Residente performing at the Festival Afrocaribeño in Veracruz, Mexico in 2009.
Awards and nominations (Note: Awards in certain categories do not have prior nominations and only winners are announced by the jury. For simplification and to avoid errors, each award in this list has been presumed to have had a prior nomination.)
Awards	Wins	Nominations
Grammy Awards	4	5
Latin Grammy Awards	27	42
Awards won	31
Nominations	74

Puerto Rican rapper Residente has won 31 awards from 74 nominations. He has been nominated for five Grammy Awards and 42 Latin Grammy Awards, winning four and 29 awards, respectively. Both Residente and his step-brother Eduardo Cabra "Visitante" hold the record of the most Latin Grammy Award wins with 24 each.

He began his music career as member of Puerto Rican group Calle 13 in 2004. The band's first album Calle 13 (2005) garnered Latin Grammy Awards for Best Urban Music Album, Best New Artist, and Best Short Form Music Video (for "Atrévete-te-te". The album also received a nomination for a Billboard Latin Music Award for Reggaeton Album of the Year.

Their second album Residente o Visitante garnered them Latin Grammy Awards for Best Urban Music Album and Best Urban Song (for "Pa'l Norte"), and received nominations for Album of the Year and Best Short Form Music Video (for "Tango del Pecado"). The album also won a Grammy Award for Best Latin Urban Album.

Calle 13's third album Los de Atrás Vienen Conmigo (2009) was recipient of Latin Grammy Awards for Album of the Year, Best Urban Music Album, Record of the Year and Best Alternative Song (for "No Hay Nadie Como Tú"), and Best Short Form Music Video (for "La Perla"). The record also garnered their second Grammy Award for Best Latin Urban Album.

Their fourth studio album Entren Los Que Quieran received Latin Grammy Awards for Album of the Year, Best Urban Music Album, Record of the Year and Song of the Year (for "Latinoamérica"), Best Alternative Song and Best Short Form Music Video (for "Calma Pueblo"), Best Urban Song (for "Baile de los Pobres"), Best Tropical Song (for "Vamo' a Portarnos Mal"), and Producer of the Year. After winning nine awards at the 12th Latin Grammy Awards, Calle 13 broke the record for most Latin Grammy wins in history with 19 awards, as well as the most wins in a single ceremony. The album also received a nomination for a Grammy Award for Best Latin Pop, Rock or Urban Album.

The group's fifth and last album Multi Viral (2014) garnered Latin Grammy Awards for Best Urban Music Album, Best Alternative Song (for "El Aguante"), and Best Short Form Music Video (for "Ojos Color Sol"), and received nominations for Album of the Year, Record of the Year (for "Respira el Momento"), Song of the Year (for "Ojos Color Sol"), Best Urban Performance and Best Urban Song (for "Adentro"), and Best Short Form Music Video (for "Adentro" and "Así de Grandes Son Las ldeas"). The album also won a Grammy Award for Best Latin Rock, Urban or Alternative Album.

Residente's first album as soloist Residente (2017) garnered him Latin Grammy Awards for Best Urban Music Album and Best Urban Song (for "Somos Anormales"), and received nominations for Album of the Year, Record of the Year and Song of the Year (for "Guerra"), Best Urban Fusion/Performance (for "Dagombas en Tamale"), Best Alternative Song (for "Apocalíptico"), Best Tropical Song (for "Hijos del Cañaveral"), and Best Short Form Music Video (for "Desencuentro"). Residente also received a Grammy Award for Best Latin Rock, Urban or Alternative Album.

His social commitment, lyrics, and contribution to popular culture garnered Residente recognitions by Amnesty International, the Ateneo Puertorriqueño, the National University of La Plata, the Nobel Peace Laureates, and the Broadcast Music, Inc. (BMI).

== Amnesty International ==
Amnesty International is a London-based non-governmental organization focused on human rights founded in 1961. Residente has received a special award for "his social commitment and identification with young people in Latin America."

Year	Nominee / work	Award	Result	Ref.
2012	Residente	Emissary of Awareness	Won	

== Ateneo Puertorriqueño ==
The Ateneo Puertorriqueño (Puerto Rican Athenaeum) is a Puerto Rican cultural institution founded in 1876. Calle 13 received the Ramón Emeterio Betances Medal in 2011 for "having fought for the permanence of the Puerto Rican identity and the freedom of the island."

Year	Nominee / work	Award	Result	Ref.
2011	Calle 13	Ramón Emeterio Betances Medal	Won	

== Berlin Music Video Awards ==
The Berlin Music Video Awards is an international festival that promotes the art of music videos.

Year	Nominee / work	Award	Result	Ref.
2020	BELLACOSO	Best Director	Nominated	
2022	THIS IS NOT AMERICA	Best Director	Won	

== Billboard ==
=== Billboard Latin Music Awards ===
The Billboard Latin Music Awards are awarded annually by Billboard magazine in the United States since 1994. Calle 13 has received one award from five nominations.

Year	Nominee / work	Award	Result	Ref.
2007	Calle 13	Reggaeton Album of the Year	Nominated	
2009	"No Hay Nadie Como Tú"	Hot Latin Song of the Year – Vocal Duet or Collaboration	Nominated	
2010	Calle 13	Latin Rhythm Albums Artist of the Year – Duo or Group	Nominated	
2015	Calle 13	Latin Rhythm Albums Artist of the Year – Duo or Group	Won	
2015	Multi Viral	Latin Rhythm Album of the Year	Nominated	

== Broadcast Music, Inc. Latin Music Awards ==
Broadcast Music, Inc. (BMI) annually hosts award shows that honor the songwriters, composers and music publishers of the year's most-performed songs in the BMI catalog. Residente has received a special award in 2018 for his "musical career and philanthropic efforts."

Year	Nominee / work	Award	Result	Ref.
2018	Residente	BMI Champion Award	Won	

== Cubadisco Awards ==
The Cubadisco Awards are presented annually by the Cuban Music Institute in Cuba since 1996 during the Feria Internacional Cubadisco (Cubadisco International Fair), an annual event dedicated to debates between music theorists, creators, and executives. Residente has received two awards as Calle 13.

Year	Nominee / work	Award	Result	Ref.
2010	Los de Atrás Vienen Conmigo	Cubadisco International Award	Won	
2012	Entren Los Que Quieran	Cubadisco International Award	Won	

== Grammy Awards ==
The Grammy Awards are awarded annually by the National Academy of Recording Arts and Sciences (NARAS) in the United States since 1959. Residente has received four awards from five nominations.

Year	Nominee / work	Award	Result	Ref.
2008	Residente o Visitante	Best Latin Urban Album	Won	
2010	Los de Atrás Vienen Conmigo	Best Latin Urban Album	Won	
2012	Entren Los Que Quieran	Best Latin Pop, Rock or Urban Album	Nominated	
2015	Multi_Viral	Best Latin Rock, Urban or Alternative Album	Won	
2018	Residente	Best Latin Rock, Urban or Alternative Album	Won	

== Latin Grammy Awards ==
The Latin Grammy Awards are awarded annually by the Latin Academy of Recording Arts & Sciences in the United States since 2000. Residente has received 27 awards from 43 nominations. He ties the record for the most Latin Grammy Award wins with his step-brother Eduardo Cabra "Visitante".

Year	Nominated work	Category	Result	Ref.
2006	Calle 13	Best New Artist	Won	
2006	Calle 13	Best Urban Music Album	Won	
2006	"Atrévete-te-te"	Best Short Form Music Video	Won	
2007	Residente o Visitante	Album of the Year	Nominated	
2007	Residente o Visitante	Best Urban Music Album	Won	
2007	"Pa'l Norte"	Best Urban Song	Won	
2007	"Tango del Pecado"	Best Short Form Music Video	Nominated	
2009	Los de Atrás Vienen Conmigo	Album of the Year	Won	
2009	Los de Atrás Vienen Conmigo	Best Urban Music Album	Won	
2009	"No Hay Nadie Como Tú"	Record of the Year	Won	
2009	"No Hay Nadie Como Tú"	Best Alternative Song	Won	
2009	"La Perla"	Best Short Form Music Video	Won	
2011	Entren Los Que Quieran	Album of the Year	Won	
2011	Entren Los Que Quieran	Best Urban Music Album	Won	
2011	"Latinoamérica"	Record of the Year	Won	
2011	"Latinoamérica"	Song of the Year	Won	
2011	"Calma Pueblo"	Best Alternative Song	Won	
2011	"Calma Pueblo"	Best Short Form Music Video	Won	
2011	"Baile de los Pobres"	Best Urban Song	Won	
2011	"Vamo' a Portarnos Mal"	Best Tropical Song	Won	
2011	Rafael Arcaute and Calle 13	Producer of the Year	Won	
2011	Sale el Sol	Album of the Year (Note: As producer.)	Nominated	
2014	Multi_Viral	Album of the Year	Nominated	
2014	Multi_Viral	Best Urban Music Album	Won	
2014	"Adentro"	Best Urban Performance	Nominated	
2014	"Adentro"	Best Short Form Music Video	Nominated	
2014	"Adentro"	Best Urban Song	Nominated	
2014	"Cuando Los Pies Besan El Piso"	Best Urban Song	Nominated	
2014	"Respira el Momento"	Record of the Year	Nominated	
2014	"Ojos Color Sol"	Song of the Year	Nominated	
2014	"El Aguante"	Best Alternative Song	Won	
2015	"Ojos Color Sol"	Best Short Form Music Video	Won	
2015	"Así de Grandes Son Las Ideas"	Best Short Form Music Video	Nominated	
2017	Residente	Album of the Year	Nominated	
2017	Residente	Best Urban Music Album	Won	
2017	"Guerra"	Record of the Year	Nominated	
2017	"Guerra"	Song of the Year	Nominated	
2017	"Somos Anormales"	Best Urban Song	Won	
2017	"Dagombas en Tamale"	Best Urban Fusion/Performance	Nominated	
2017	"Apocalíptico"	Best Alternative Song	Nominated	
2017	"Hijos del Cañaveral"	Best Tropical Song	Nominated	
2017	"Desencuentro"	Best Short Form Music Video	Nominated	
2018	"Sexo"	Best Short Form Music Video	Nominated	
2018	"Guerra"	Best Short Form Music Video	Nominated	
2018	Soy Yo	Album of the Year	Nominated	
2019	"Banana Papaya (With Kany García)"	Best Short Form Music Video	Won	
2020
2020	"René"	Record of the Year	Nominated	
2020	"René"	Song of the Year	Won	
2020	"Cántalo (With Ricky Martin and Bad Bunny)"	Best Urban Fusion/Performance	Nominated	
2020	"Antes Que El Mundo Se Acabe"	Best Rap/Hip Hop Song	Won	
2022	"This Is Not America" (ft. Ibeyi)	Best Urban Fusion/Performance	Nominated	
2022	"This Is Not America" (ft. Ibeyi)	Best Short Form Music Video	Won	
2024	Las Letras Ya No Importan	Album of the Year	Nominated	
2024	"313" (ft. Penélope Cruz & Sílvia Pérez Cruz)	Song of the Year	Nominated	
2024	"313" (ft. Penélope Cruz & Sílvia Pérez Cruz)	Best Short Form Music Video	Won	

== Lo Nuestro Awards ==
The Lo Nuestro Awards are awarded annually by television network Univision in the United States since 1989. Calle 13 has received four nominations.

Year	Nominee / work	Award	Result	Ref.
2008	"Pa'l Norte"	Video of the Year	Nominated	
2009	"Un Beso de Desayuno"	Video of the Year	Nominated	
2010	"No Hay Nadie Como Tú"	Collaboration of the Year	Nominated	
2010	"La Perla"	Video of the Year	Nominated	

== MTV Awards ==
=== MTV Video Music Awards ===
The MTV Video Music Awards are awarded annually by cable television network MTV in the United States since 1984. Residente has received one award.

Year	Nominee / work	Award	Result	Ref.
2017	"Immigrants (We Get the Job Done)"	Best Fight Against the System	Won	

=== Los Premios MTV Latinoamérica ===
The Premios MTV Latinoamérica were awarded annually by cable television network MTV Networks Latin America from 2002 to 2009. Calle 13 has received two awards from nine nominations.

Year	Nominee / work	Award	Result	Ref.
2006	Calle 13	Best Alternative Artist	Nominated	
2006	Calle 13	Promising Artist	Won	
2006	"Atrévete-te-te"	Video of the Year	Nominated	
2007	Calle 13	Best Urban Artist	Nominated	
2007	Calle 13	MTV Tr3́s Viewer's Choice Award – Best Urban Artist	Nominated	
2007	"Tango del Pecado"	Video of the Year	Nominated	
2009	Calle 13	Best Group or Duet	Nominated	
2009	Calle 13	Best Urban Artist	Won	
2009	"Electro Movimiento"	Video of the Year	Nominated	

== National University of La Plata ==
The Rodolfo Walsh Award is presented annually by the School of Journalism and Social Communication at the National University of La Plata in Buenos Aires Province, Argentina since 1997. Calle 13 has received the Rodolfo Walsh Award in 2012 for their "contribution to communication and popular culture."

Year	Nominee / work	Award	Result	Ref.
2012	Calle 13	Rodolfo Walsh Award	Won	

== News and Documentary Emmy Awards ==
News and Documentary Emmy Awards is presented by the National Academy of Television Arts & Sciences (NATAS) to recognize excellence in American national news and documentary programming. Established in 1980, the ceremonies are held annually in New York City. Residente has received one award.

Year	Nominee / work	Award	Result	Ref.
2022	Life of Crime (documentary trilogy)	Outstanding Crime and Justice Documentary	Won	

== Premios Juventud ==
The Premios Juventud are awarded annually by television network Univision in the United States since 2004. Calle 13 has received one nomination.

Year	Nominee / work	Award	Result	Ref.
2014	"Multi_Viral"	Favorite Lyrics	Nominated	

== Telehit Awards ==
The Telehit Awards are presented annually by Mexican television network Telehit in Mexico since 2008. Calle 13 has received one award.

Year	Nominee / work	Award	Result	Ref.
2012	Calle 13	Musical Quality	Won	

== World Summit of Nobel Peace Laureates ==
The World Summit of Nobel Peace Laureates is an annual event centered in peacemaking, serving as a forum for Nobel peace Laureates and representatives of the leading international organizations, media, business and government. Residente has received the Nobel Peace Summit Award in 2015 for "his song lyrics and his support for social causes."

Year	Nominee / work	Award	Result	Ref.
2015	Residente	Nobel Peace Summit Award	Won	

== See also ==
- Residente discography
