= Residente discography =

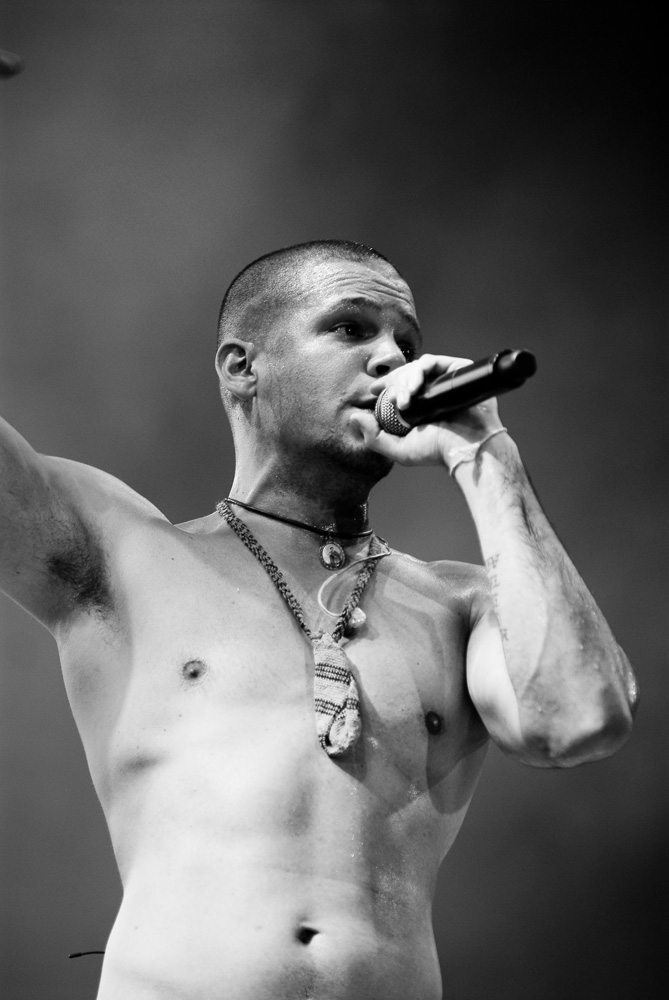
- Residente performing at the Festival Afrocaribeño in Veracruz, Mexico in 2009.
- Studio albums: 1
- Singles: 20
- Music videos: 3

Puerto Rican rapper and songwriter Residente has released one studio album, twenty singles, and three music videos as soloist.

After 10 years working with his step-brother Eduardo Cabra "Visitante" on Calle 13, the group disbanded in 2015 and both members followed their respective careers solo. Residente took a DNA test that revealed his roots trace back to 10 different locations around the world, which inspired him to produce a studio album, a documentary, and a book released by Univision's Fusion Media Group under the same title Residente. He wrote and recorded the project over the course of two years in the countries where his roots are, including Siberia, Moscow, China, the Caucasus, France, Spain, England, Armenia, South Ossetia, Antigua, Ghana, Burkina Faso, Niger, Serbia, and Puerto Rico.

His first solo album Residente was released on March 31, 2017 and includes the singles "Somos Anormales" and "Desencuentro". The album peaked at number three in the US Latin Albums and at number one in the US World Albums charts. Residente also made his solo directorial debut and directed three music videos for the record. Residente was elected the best Latin album of 2017 by the critics of Billboard, as well as the 19th best album overall of the same year. It was also ranked 38th on Rolling Stone's 50 Best Albums of 2017 list.

== Albums ==
Title	Album details	Peak chart positions		Sales
Title	Album details	US Latin	US World	Sales
Residente	Released: March 31, 2017; Label: Sony Latin; Formats: CD, digital download	3	1	US: 3,000 (as of April 6, 2017)
Las Letras Ya No Importan	Released: February 22, 2024; Label: Sony Music Latin and 5020 Records	49	–	

== Singles ==
Title	Year	Peak chart positions				Certifications (sales thresholds)	Album
Title	Year	US Latin	ARG	MEX	SPA	Certifications (sales thresholds)	Album
"Somos Anormales"	2017	— (Note: "Somos Anormales" did not enter the Billboard Hot Latin Songs chart but peaked on the Latin Pop Airplay chart at number 26.)	—	46	—		Residente
"Desencuentro" (featuring SoKo)	2017	— (Note: "Desencuentro" did not enter the Billboard Hot Latin Songs chat but peaked on the Latin Airplay chart at number 26.)	—	— (Note: "Desencuentro" did not enter the Billboard Mexico Airplay chart but peaked on the Mexico Pop Español Airplay chart at number 30.)	—		Residente
"Mis Disculpas"	2017	—	—	—	—		Non-album single
"La Cátedra"	2017	—	—	—	—		Non-album single
"Sexo" (with Dillon Francis featuring iLe)	2018	— (Note: "Sexo" did not enter the Billboard Hot Latin Songs chart but peaked on the Latin Airplay chart at number 46.)	—	— (Note: "Sexo" did not enter the Billboard Mexico Airplay chart but peaked on the Mexico Pop Español Airplay chart at number 29.)	—	RIAA: Gold (Latin)	Wut Wut
"Rap Bruto" (with Nach)	2018	—	—	—	—		Almanauta
"Querido Louis" (featuring Trooko)	2018	—	—	—	—		Non-album single
"Bellacoso" (with Bad Bunny)	2019	24	35	—	61		TBA
"Pecador"	2019	—	—	—	—		TBA
"Cántalo" (with Ricky Martin and Bad Bunny)	2019	35	—	—	—	RIAA: Gold (Latin)	TBA
"Afilando Los Cuchillos" (with Bad Bunny and iLE)	2019	—	—	—	—		Non-album single
"René"	2020	34	2	—	23		TBA
"Latinoamérica" (Edición Cuarentena)	2020	—	—	—	—		Non-album single
"Antes Que El Mundo Se Acabe"	2020	—	92	—	—		TBA
"Hoy"	2020	—	—	—	—		TBA
"Yo Te Quiero a Ti"	2020	—	—	—	—		TBA
"Flow HP" (with Don Omar)	2021	35	—	—	—		Forever King
"Residente: Bzrp Music Sessions, Vol. 49" (with Bizarrap)	2022	22	1	4	3		Non-album single
"This Is Not America" (featuring Ibeyi)	2022	—	—	—	—		TBA
"Cosquillita"	2022	—	—	—	—		Non-album single
"Bajo y Batería"	2023	—	—	—	—		Non-album single
"Quiero Ser Baladista"	2023	—	—	—	—		Non-album single
"—" denotes a recording that did not chart or was not released in that territory.

=== Featured singles ===
Title	Year	Peak chart positions	Album
Title	Year	US Latin	Album
"Chulin Culin Chunfly" (Julio Voltio featuring Residente)	2006	8	Voltio
"—" denotes a recording that did not chart or was not released in that territory.

== Other charted songs ==
Title	Year	Peak chart positions			Album
Title	Year	US Rap Digital	US World Digital	MEX Español	Album
"Gordita" (Shakira featuring Residente)	2010	—	—	27	Sale el Sol
"Immigrants (We Get the Job Done)" (with K'naan, Snow Tha Product, and Riz MC)	2016	22	—	—	The Hamilton Mixtape
"Hijos del Cañaveral"	2017	—	10	—	Residente
"—" denotes a recording that did not chart or was not released in that territory.

== Music videos ==
Title	Year	Other performer(s)	Director(s)	Ref.
"Somos Anormales"	2017		René Pérez Joglar	
"Desencuentro"	2017	SoKo	René Pérez Joglar	
"Guerra"	2017		René Pérez Joglar	
"Sexo"	2018	Dillon Francis, iLe	René Pérez Joglar	
"Rap Bruto"	2018	Nach	René Pérez Joglar	
"Banana Papaya"	2018	Kany García	René Pérez Joglar	
"Bellacoso"	2019	Bad Bunny	Gregory Ohrel	
"This Is Not America"	2022	Ibeyi	Gregory Ohrel	

=== Featured music videos ===
Title	Year	Other performer(s)	Director(s)	Ref.
"Chulin Culin Chunfly"	2006	Julio Voltio	Gabriel Coss	
"No Hay Igual" (Remix)	2006	Nelly Furtado	Gabriel Coss; Israel Lugo	
"Pa' Tras"	2010	Dante Spinetta	Javier Usandivaras	
"Immigrants (We Get The Job Done)"	2017	K'naan, Snow Tha Product, Riz MC	Tomas Whitmore	

== Album appearances ==
Title	Year	Other performers	Album	Ref.
"Chulin Chulin Chunfly"	2005	Julio Voltio	Voltio	
"Te Llevo"	2006	Leonor	Mil Caminos	
"No Hay Igual" (Remix)	2006	Nelly Furtado	Loose (Note: The remix version of "No Hay Igual" by Nelly Furtado featuring Residente was included on Loose's Spanish special edition and the International Tour Edition in 2007.)	
"Cuál Es El Plan y Eso"	2007	Tego Calderón, Yaviah	El Abayarde Contraataca	
"Canción Para Un Niño en la Calle"	2009	Mercedes Sosa	Cantora 2	
"Pa' Tras"	2010	Dante Spinetta	Pyramide	
"Insoportablemente Cruel"	2010	Andrés Calamaro	On the Rock	
"Gordita"	2010	Shakira	Sale el Sol	
"Plena y Bomba"	2011	Susana Baca	Afrodiáspora	
"Immigrants (We Get The Job Done)"	2016	K'naan, Snow Tha Product, Riz MC	The Hamilton Mixtape	
"Banana Papaya"	2018	Kany García	Soy Yo	

== See also ==
- Calle 13 discography
- List of awards and nominations received by Residente
