= Muerte en Hawáii =

2011 song by Calle 13

Single by Calle 13

from the album Entren Los Que Quieran
- Released: 6 July 2011
- Genre: Rock
- Length: 3:09
- Label: Sony Latin
- Lyricists: René Pérez Joglar, Eduardo José Cabra Martínez
- Producer: Eduardo José Cabra Martínez

Calle 13 singles chronology
"Baile de los pobres" (2010)	"Muerte en Hawáii" (2011)	"Latinoamérica" (2011)

Music video
- "Muerte en Hawáii" on YouTube

Muerte en Hawáii is a song by the Puerto Rican alternative hip-hop band Calle 13. It was the fourth single from their fourth studio album, Entren Los Que Quieran (2010).

The song was released in July 2011, with the music video published shortly after on the band's YouTube channel.

== Video ==
The video was directed by Camilo Antonilio and Juan José Campanera and produced by Muriel Cabeza. The video begins with René and his wife going on vacation to the beach when suddenly a shooting starts, resulting in serious injuries by the end.

Three days after its release, the video reached over 3 million views, and within a week, it surpassed 6.5 million views.

== Charts ==
Chart performance for "Muerte en Hawáii"
Chart (2011)	Peak position
Mexico (Billboard Mexican Airplay)	48
US Latin Pop Airplay (Billboard)	33
US Latin Rhythm Airplay (Billboard)	11

== Certifications ==
Certifications for "Muerte en Hawáii"
Region	Certification	Certified units/sales
Mexico (AMPROFON)	Platinum	60,000^{*}
Spain (Promusicae)	Platinum	60,000^{‡}
^{*} Sales figures based on certification alone.^{‡} Sales+streaming figures based on certification alone.
