= Polidor =

Coordinates: 48°50′59″N 2°20′24″E

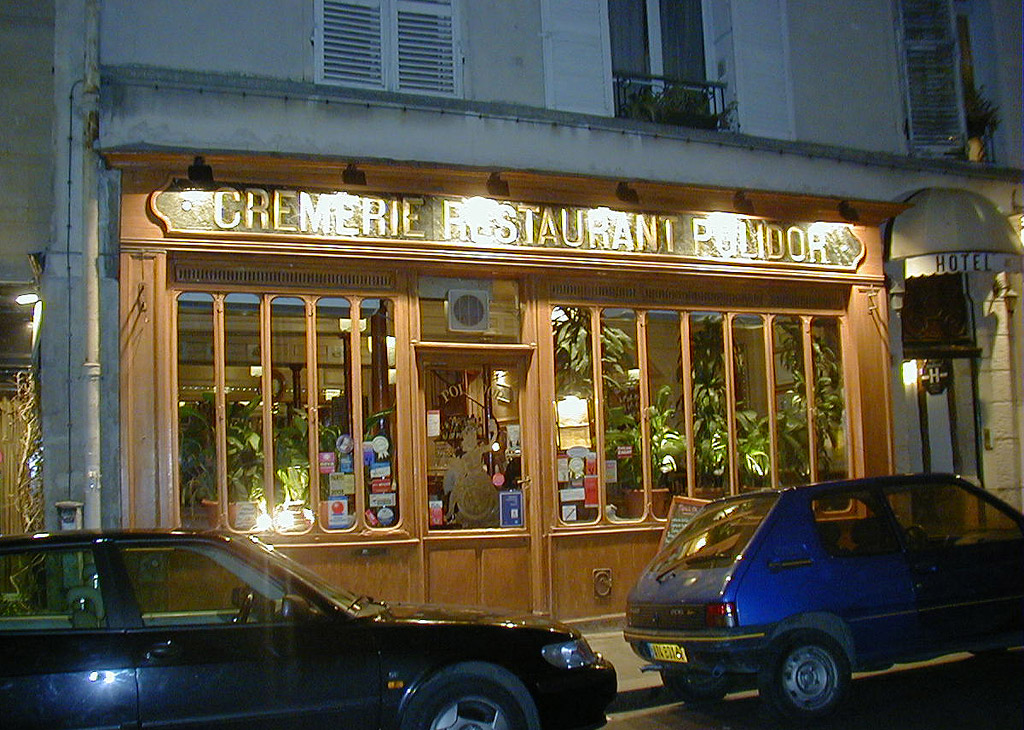
- Le Polidor
- Interactive map of Polidor

Restaurant information
- Established: 1845
- Food type: Traditional French
- Location: 41, rue Monsieur-le-Prince, 6th arrondissement of Paris, 75006, France
- Website: https://www.polidor.com

The Crémerie-Restaurant Polidor is a historic restaurant in the 6th arrondissement of Paris open 365 days a year. Its predecessor was a cheese shop founded in 1845 and the crémerie part of its name derives from the French cheese, eggs and cream it first sold as a fromagerie. In 1890 the owner changed it into a bistro restaurant. It has had its present name since the beginning of the 20th century.

The modest Belle Epoque interior of the restaurant is basically unchanged for over 100 years, and the style of cooking remains that of the late 19th century. Its tables have well-fed many writers, artists, Sorbonne University and Collège de France students, local residents and visitors to the neighborhood for over 175 years.

Polidor is located at 41, rue Monsieur-le-Prince in the Odéon area, near the Jardin du Luxembourg. Most diners sit at long, shared tables, with communal salt and pepper shakers and pots of French mustard. Its menu (and Turkish toilet bathroom) has remained basically unchanged for decades. Polidor has been described as legendary by Ernest Hemingway who lived nearby for a time in the 1920s. Hemingway refers glowingly to dinners he had at Le Polidor with artist and writer friends and his first wife Hadley Richardson in his book about Paris cultural life during the 1920s called A Moveable Feast.

In addition to its decor and traditional French cuisine, Polidor is known for its illustrious clientele. It is said to have been a favorite of Louis Ménard, Paul Verlaine, Arthur Rimbaud (who lived on rue Monsieur Le Prince), André Gide, James Joyce, Ernest Hemingway, Antonin Artaud, Gertrude Stein, Paul Valéry, Boris Vian, Julio Cortázar, Jack Kerouac, and Henry Miller.

It is also known for being the meeting place of the Collège de ’Pataphysique, and its principals, French writers Luc Étienne and Raymond Queneau. A club formed around the French Symbolist poet Paul Verlaine called Les Amis de Verlaine still meets there regularly. Besides that, Polidor remains a popular restaurant on the Left Bank, particularly among students at the nearby University of Paris (Sorbonne) and Collège de France.

In 2011, it was featured in the film Midnight in Paris by Woody Allen. In 2017, it was the setting for the music video for "Desencuentro", a song by the Puerto Rican singer Residente. The video features Charlotte Le Bon and Édgar Ramírez.

In the Lee Child novel The Enemy, the protagonist, Jack Reacher, has dinner with his brother Joe and their French mother Josephine at Polidor.

Polidor is a famous old restaurant. It makes you feel like all kinds of people have eaten there. Gourmets, spies, painters, fugitives, cops, robbers.

— Lee Child, The Enemy (Jack Reacher, Book 8)
