= Entren Los Que Quieran =

Studio album by Calle 13
- Released: November 22, 2010
- Recorded: Puerto Rico and Miami, Florida
- Genres: Latin; alternative hip hop; urban
- Length: 50:26
- Language: Spanish
- Label: Sony Latin
- Producers: Elías de León; Visitante

Calle 13 chronology
Los de Atrás Vienen Conmigo (2008)	''Entren Los Que Quieran'' (2010)	Multi Viral (2014)

Singles from Entren Los Que Quieran
- 1. "Calma Pueblo" Released: July 19, 2010; 2. "Vamo' a Portarnos Mal" Released: October 5, 2010; 3. "El Baile de los Pobres" Released: February 10, 2011; 4. "Muerte en Hawáii" Released: July 8, 2011; 5. "Latinoamérica" Released: September 27, 2011; 6. "El Hormiguero" Released: December 13, 2011; 7. "Prepárame la Cena" Released: January 20, 2012; 8. "La Vuelta al Mundo" Released: May 7, 2012; 9. "La Bala" Released: November 2, 2012; 10. "Digo lo Que Pienso" Released: October 16, 2013

Entren Los Que Quieran (English: Enter Those Who Want to) is the fourth studio album by Puerto Rican hip hop band Calle 13, released on November 22, 2010. Recorded in the wake of controversial events surrounding the group, the album contains more political lyrical themes not discussed on previous Calle 13 releases. It also expands upon the musical experimentation demonstrated in the group's albums Residente o Visitante (2007) and Los de Atrás Vienen Conmigo (2008). The record's compositions feature various musical styles, including rock, ska, merengue, reggaeton, and Bollywood music.

The album received generally positive reviews from critics, who praised the record's diverse musical experimentation. Entren Los Que Quieran impacted several charts internationally, peaking at number six on the Billboard Latin Albums chart and number 25 on the Billboard Rap Albums chart. The record spawned seven singles, including "Latinoamérica", which reached the top ten of both the Billboard Latin Digital Songs and Latin Rhythm Digital Songs charts. The record won a total of nine Latin Grammy Awards, including Album of the Year. It was also nominated for a Grammy in the Best Latin, Pop, Rock or Urban Album category at the 2012 Grammys.

== Background and recording ==
Drawing influence from a more diverse array of musical styles than Residente o Visitante (2007), Calle 13 released Los de Atrás Vienen Conmigo in 2008, which experimented with genres such as samba, candombe, and electronica. The album won five Latin Grammys at the Latin Grammy Awards of 2009 including "Album of the Year". The group generated controversy when vocalist/lyricist Residente was hosting the 2009 MTV Latin America Awards and attempted to inform the audience about a strike in Puerto Rico in protest of governor Luis Fortuño's cutting of thousands of government jobs, one of which belonged to Residente's mother. During the ceremony, he referred to Fortuño as a "son of a whore", which generated widespread anger towards the group. Reflecting on the incident "I was upset, really upset. But I'm a little more strategic now - I want to speak the truth, but I don't want to diminish the merits of what I'm saying."

Calle 13 once again became the subject of debate when the duo traveled to Cuba in March 2010, to perform in front of the American embassy in the country. Before the show, a political prisoner had died in a hunger strike in protest of the Cuban government, and Cuban exiles in Miami criticized the group for performing at such a time. Residente defended the performance, noting that it had been inaccurately reported and that "we said things that no artist had said from the stage, like 'here the people are in charge, and the government has to obey.'" These events had a major impact on Residente's lyrical style and the subjects he planned to discuss on the new album: "What's making me more mature is not about my age, it's about what I'm seeing and living. I'm not saying things carelessly anymore. I'm thinking before I say them."

Recording sessions for the album took place at Playbach Studios and Música Satánica Studios in San Juan, Puerto Rico, as well as Circle House Studios in Miami, Florida. It was mixed at Circle House Studios and Zeitgeist Sound Studios in Long Island, New York. The phrase "entren los que quieran" has been translated as "everyone is welcome". Visitante explained that the title of the album means that "Everyone’s invited to enter. If you don’t want to, well don’t." Ed Morales of the New York Daily News interpreted the album's title as "an invitation to like-minded Latino youth to a safe space for rebellion." The album's artwork features illustrations of explosives; Billboard writer Judy Cantor Navas opined that this "simultaneously exceeded and parodied [Calle 13's] reputation as provocateur".

== Music and lyrics ==
"Calma Pueblo"
This song features "vicious" guitar work from Omar Rodríguez-López from The Mars Volta. Visitante compared the track to the Beastie Boys.

"Muerte En Hawaii"
"Muerte En Hawaii" features prominent use of a ukulele and has been described as having a "beach sound".

Visitante, who composed and performed the music on the record, stated that the album continues to experiment with different styles of music. He noted that the group's collaboration with Omar Rodríguez-López from The Mars Volta on "Calma Pueblo" gives the song a "Beastie Boys vibe." Rodríguez-López's guitar work on the track has been categorized as "vicious" and is said to match the violence in the song's lyrics "at every turn". "Baile de los Pobres" contains elements of Bollywood music and reggaeton, while the atmospheric qualities of "La Bala" have been compared to Spaghetti Western film soundtracks. "Vamo' a Portarnos Mal" features ska and merengue-influenced rhythms. Visitante employs a ukulele on "Muerte en Hawaii", a song that contains a "cool beach sound". "Latinoamérica" has been described as "folkloric" and features guest vocals from Susana Baca, from Peru, Totó la Momposina, from Colombia, and Maria Rita, from Brazil.

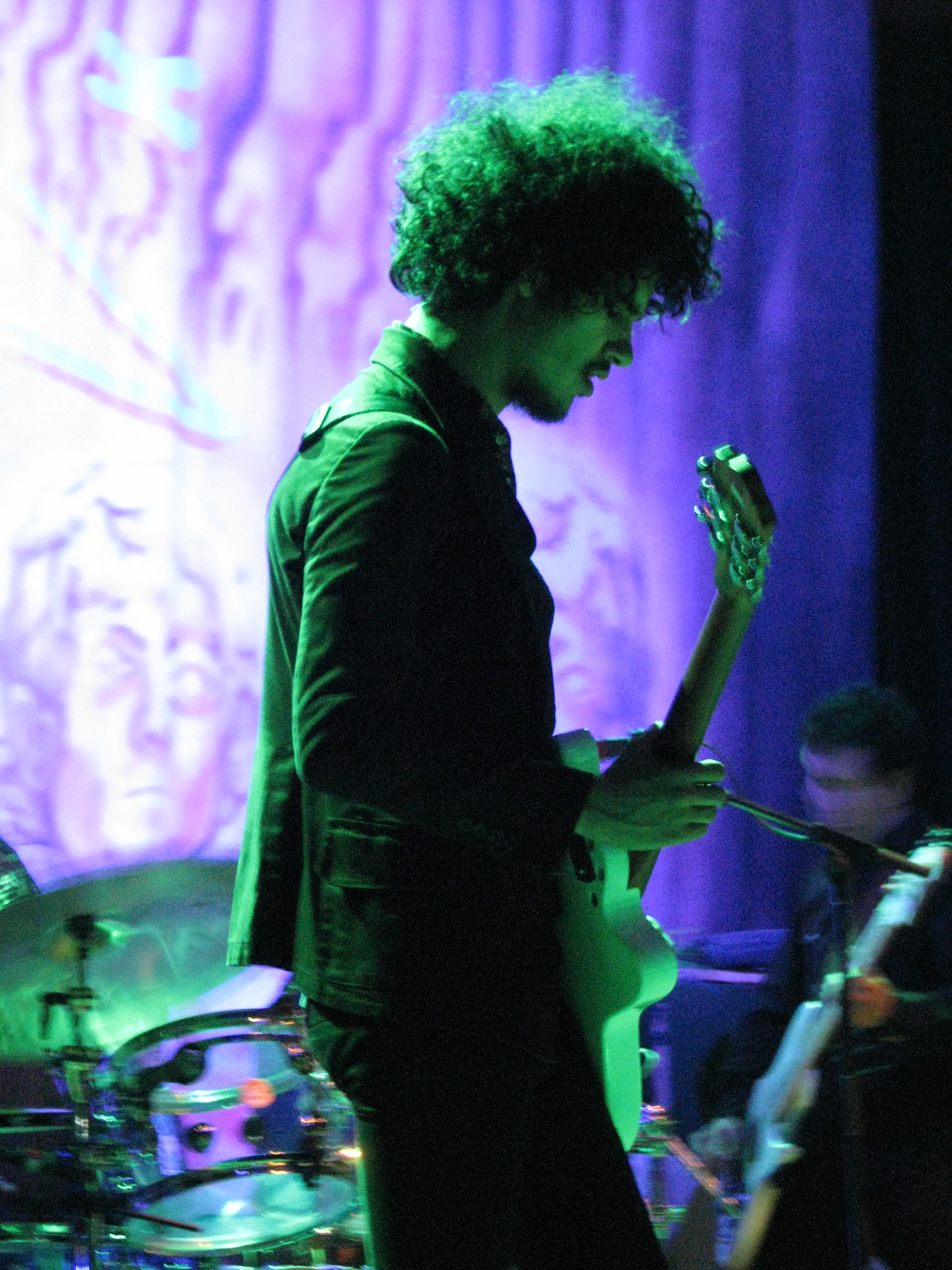
Puerto Rican-American guitarist Omar Rodríguez-López of The Mars Volta appears on "Calma Pueblo".

With the lyrics on Entren Los Que Quieran, Residente took a more political approach, inspired by events that transpired after the last album. "Calma Pueblo" discusses various topics including dishonest politicians, lip-synching in live performances, and payola. Residente also references Calle 13's sponsors with the line "Adidas doesn't use me, I use Adidas." Residente originally wrote eight pages of lyrics for "Calma Pueblo", but later "deleted and deleted" many of the words, as he felt that the song's subject matter "can come off like cheap pamphleteering. And that's not what I wanted to do." "Digo Lo Que Pienso" has been labeled as a "scathing attack" on San Juan mayor Jorge Santini.

"Latinoamérica" is a celebration of Latin America and its culture as well as a statement against United States intervention in the region; in the song, Residente vows that he will "never forget" Operation Condor. "La Bala" illustrates the pathway of a bullet as a means to denounce violence. According to Visitante, "Prepárame la Cena" is about "being imprisoned", adding, "Sometimes you can be imprisoned and still be outside." "Baile De Los Pobres" has been described as a "lust song" with subject matter comparable to Billy Joel's "working-class desires" in his 1983 song "Uptown Girl". Residente's "gentler side" is displayed on "La Vuelta al Mundo", where he describes a trip around the world to escape the monotonous nature of working in an office cubicle.

== Reception ==
=== Commercial ===
Entren Los Que Quieran peaked at number six on the Billboard Latin Albums chart, remaining on the chart for 25 weeks. It also peaked at number 25 on the Billboard Rap Albums chart, remaining on the chart for one week, as well as number 199 on the magazine's Top Current Albums chart. The record peaked at number one in Argentina, number 22 in Mexico, and number 90 in Spain.

"Calma Pueblo" was the first single to be released from the album; it was released on August 9, 2010. "Vamo' A Portarnos Mal" was the second single released from the album; it peaked at #32 on the Billboard Latin Pop Airplay, #21 on the Billboard Latin Tropical Airplay, and #11 on the Billboard Latin Rhythm Airplay charts. "Digo Lo Que Pienso" peaked at #16 on the Latin Rhythm Digital Songs. "Baile de los Pobres" was the fourth single to be released from the album, on February 21, 2011. The fifth single, "Muerte en Hawaii", peaked at #33 on the Latin Pop Airplay and #11 on the Latin Rhythm Airplay charts. "Latinoamérica" peaked at #9 on the Billboard Latin Digital Songs and #3 on the Latin Rhythm Digital Songs chart. "La Vuelta al Mundo" was the last single from the album; it peaked at #14 on the Latin Rhythm Airplay chart and #44 in Mexico.

=== Critical ===
Professional ratings
Review scores
Source	Rating
AllMusic	3.5/5 stars
Entertainment Weekly	A−
The Tufts Daily	4/5 stars

Entren Los Que Quieran received generally positive reviews from critics. Melissa Maerz of Entertainment Weekly gave the album an A− grade, writing, "Igniting their agitprop songs with Bollywood, Hawaiian, hip-hop, and Latin styles on Entren Los Que Quieran, they’ll make you want to bomb any radio station that won’t play rock en español." Mariano Prunes of AllMusic gave Entren Los Que Quieran three and a half stars out of five, and felt that while the album was strong overall, the shock value employed in the group's earlier records had become less impactful: "As the album progresses, while the beats remain strong and the lyrics clever, this maximum-impact approach tends to eventually exhaust itself." Jasmine Garsd of NPR praised the album and referred to the song "Latinoamérica" as "a gorgeous ode to Latinos everywhere". Garsd commented on the band's appeal to Latin American listeners, explaining "They are fighters who endure and struggle against the very real horrors of Latin America. But part of their defiance lies in the ability to have fun, to be funny and sexy in spite of these horrors."

Bill Friskics-Warren of The Washington Post recommended the album, particularly the tracks "Calma Pueblo", "La Bala", and "Vamo' a Portarnos Mal", and applauded Visitante's musical diversity, calling his compositions "as globally conscious as the band's message." Judy Cantor-Navas of Billboard called "La Bala" the album's "most affecting" track, and wrote that "Calle 13's fierce brand of first-person social commentary and all-terrain rebellion transmits as honest and even brave, even if Perez's defensive swagger can become tiresome." Melissa MacEwen of The Tufts Daily gave the album four out of five stars, commending the album's cohesiveness and calling the album a "highly listenable album valuable for both its witty lyrics and song structures, and its definitively dance−worthy feel".

=== Accolades ===
Entren Los Que Quieran received ten nominations at the Latin Grammy Awards of 2011—a record for Latin Grammy nominations. Jon Pareles of the Los Angeles Times opined that the group's eclectic musical experimentation helped the band qualify for multiple categories, including Urban, Alternative, and Tropical. The record won "Album of the Year", the group's second release in a row to win the award, after Los de Atrás Vienen Conmigo (2008). The group also won Best Urban album, Best Urban Song for "Baile de los Pobres", and both Record of the Year (for recording) and Song of the Year (for songwriting) for "Latinoamérica". The album also received a Grammy nomination for Best Latin Pop, Rock or Urban Album. In Mexico, the album received two nominations for the Oye! Awards, for Album of the Year and Latin Urban Album of the Year, while "Prepárame la Cena" was nominated for Song of the Year from a Telenovela show.

== Track listing ==
All lyrics are written by Residente; all music is composed by Visitante

No.	Title	Length
1.	"Intro"	3:17
2.	"Calma Pueblo" (featuring Omar Rodríguez-López)	4:09
3.	"El Baile de los Pobres"	3:27
4.	"La Vuelta al Mundo"	3:54
5.	"La Bala"	4:27
6.	"Vamo' a Portarnos Mal"	6:07
7.	"Latinoamérica" (featuring Totó la Momposina, Susana Baca & Maria Rita)	4:57
8.	"Inter - En Annunakilandia" (Interlude)	1:04
9.	"Digo lo Que Pienso"	5:06
10.	"Muerte en Hawáii"	3:09
11.	"Todo Se Mueve" (featuring Seun Kuti and Nestor Torres)	3:22
12.	"El Hormiguero"	4:51
13.	"Prepárame la Cena"	5:19
14.	"Outro"	1:11
Total length:		50:26

== Chart performance ==
=== Weekly charts ===
Chart (2010)	Peak position
Argentine Albums Chart	1
Ecuadorian Albums Chart	16
Mexican Albums Chart	22
Spanish Albums Chart	90
Peruan Albums Charts	4
U.S. Billboard Top Current Albums	199
U.S. Billboard Top Latin Albums	6
U.S. Billboard Top Rap Albums	26
Venezuelan Albums (Recordland)	5

=== Year-end charts ===
Chart (2011)	Position
US Latin Albums (Billboard)	68
US Latin Rhythm Albums (Billboard)	6

== See also ==
- 2010 in Latin music
