= Panasuyo =

- Born: Aureliano Méndez; 6 November 1974 (age 51); Guanare, Venezuela
- Occupations: Musician, composer

Aureliano Méndez (born 6 November 1974), better known to his fans as Panasuyo, is a Venezuelan musician. His trademark sound is a fusion of traditional Venezuelan musical forms and Caribbean rhythms with rock, pop and reggae.

Méndez was born in Guanare, in Venezuela's Portuguesa State.

In 2003 he created the soundtrack for a short film The Mexican Dream, by director Gustavo Hernandez Perez, a tragi-comic drama based on the longings and delusions that lure illegal immigrants to the USA, which was shown on HBO Latino.

In 2005, "Rio Bellisimo", his first single, went to number one in Venezuela's local radio chart. He also took part in the album "Simon Diaz Remixes" in 2006, which saw a number of young Venezuelan talents producing remixes of songs by the famous Venezuelan singer and composer Simon Diaz.

Panasuyo's album "Monte y Culebra" was also released in 2006, including the tracks "Bien Sencillo", "Besito" and "Monte y Culebra", leading to a publishing deal with Warner Chappell Latin in 2007.

He received two Grammy nominations in 2007, one for participating as a producer of the Record of the Year 2007 and another as co-writer of Best Urban Song 2007 - both for the album "Residente o Visitante" for Puerto Rican group Calle 13.

He sings on "Tango del Pecado" by Calle 13, which also features Gustavo Santaolalla and his group Bajofondo. Panasuyo also produced "La Era de la Copiaera" on the same album.

He was Latin Grammy Award Winner 2007 as composer of "Pal Norte", for which he was producer/composer/performer. He won the American Grammy 2008 for Best Latin Alternative Album.
