= Tango del Pecado =

Single by Calle 13 featuring Bajofondo & Panasuyo

from the album Residente o Visitante
- Released: March 27, 2007
- Genre: Reggaeton, tango
- Length: 4:15
- Label: Sony BMG Music Entertainment (US Latin)
- Songwriters: Eduardo Cabra, Rene Perez, Juan Campodónico, Gustavo Santaolalla
- Producers: Eduardo Cabra, Gustavo Santaolalla, Juan Campodónico

Calle 13 singles chronology
"La Jirafa" (2006)	"Tango del Pecado" (2007)	"La Cumbia de los Aburridos" (2007)

"Tango del Pecado" (Tango of Sin) is the first single from Calle 13's second album, Residente o Visitante. The song features Bajofondo & Panasuyo and was released on iTunes via digital download on March 27, 2007.

== Composition ==
=== Music ===
"Tango del Pecado" mixes tango and reggaeton, and has been referred to as "tango-tón". The song features Argentinian music producer Gustavo Santaolalla and his Bajafondo Tango Club.

=== Lyrics ===
The inspiration behind the song stems from the public's reaction to his real-life relationship with former Miss Universe Denise Quiñones, and a negative letter that Residente received from someone after he began dating her in which it was stated that Quiñones was going to burn in hell for dating the rapper. "Tango del Pecado" is addressed to Quiñones' parents, who did not approve of the couple's relationship. He explains that the song expresses how he will still date her regardless of their opinions, and also that "It's a calling out of the morality of Latin America. It's just an invitation to turn everything upside-down by embracing the ugly and profane in life and, you know, asking people to go on that journey." "Tango del Pecado" is the only single from Residente o Visitante that didn't need to be slightly edited due to vulgar lyrics.

== Music video ==
Filmed on February 25, 2007 at the Hacienda Siesta Alegre, in the town of Río Grande, Puerto Rico, the video suggests a surreal sequence where Residente and real-life girlfriend Denise Quiñones are married in a garden, with barbed wire physically separating their families, Puerto Rico comedian Sunshine Logroño dressed as an archbishop to marry them, Tego Calderón and Julio Voltio acting as best men, and various peculiar characters surrounding them. It ends with a UFO abducting Residente and Quiñones after the wedding. The video was directed by Gabriel Coss and Israel Lugo. On August 29, 2007, the video received a Latin Grammy nomination for Best Short Form Music Video.

== Reception ==
"Tango del Pecado" reached number 14 on the Billboard Latin Rhythm Airplay chart.

Agustin Gurza of the Los Angeles Times referred to "Tango del Pecado" as "deliciously seductive" and "[one] of the most memorable songs of the year." Jason Birchmeier of Allmusic enjoyed the Residente's storytelling on the track, calling the song a "clever narrative".
