= Afilando Los Cuchillos =

Puerto Rico 2019 protest song

Single by Residents de calle
- Released: December 13, 2019
- Recorded: July 16, 2019
- Genre: Alternative hip hop; Latin
- Length: 5:21
- Label: Residents de calle
- Songwriters: René Pérez Joglar; Benito Ocasio; iLe

Residents de calle singles chronology
"Cántalo" (2019)	"Afilando Los Cuchillos" (2019)	"René" (2020)

Music video
- "Residente, iLe & Bad Bunny - Afilando los Cuchillos (Cover Audio)" on YouTube

"Afilando Los Cuchillos" transl. "Sharpening the Knives" is a protest song by Puerto Rican musicians Bad Bunny, Residente, and iLe. It was released on July 17, 2019 through YouTube, in response to Ricardo Rosselló and the Telegramgate.

The song was officially independently released as a single five months later, on December 13, 2019, credited to the pseudonym "Residents de calle".

== Background ==
The beat was produced by Trooko. The song was written and recorded in one day and received 2.5 million views on YouTube within the first day of its release. In the song, the artists accuse Rosselló of corruption, homophobia, and incompetence. Residente raps about the emotions of the citizens of Puerto Rico who have experienced generations of government corruption. He also raps about how there are still houses without roofs as a result of Hurricane Maria. Bad Bunny raps about how the youth are disillusioned by the government's aggressive prosecution of petty crime while simultaneously underfunding education in Puerto Rico.

Los 40 described iLe's hymn in the song as melodic. NPR calls the song a clear example of a Latin American protest song and Pitchfork describes it as a diss track.

On July 17, 2019, Residente, Bad Bunny, and Ricky Martin attended protests in front of the Capitol of Puerto Rico.
