= Ile (singer) =

Puerto Rican singer (born 1989)

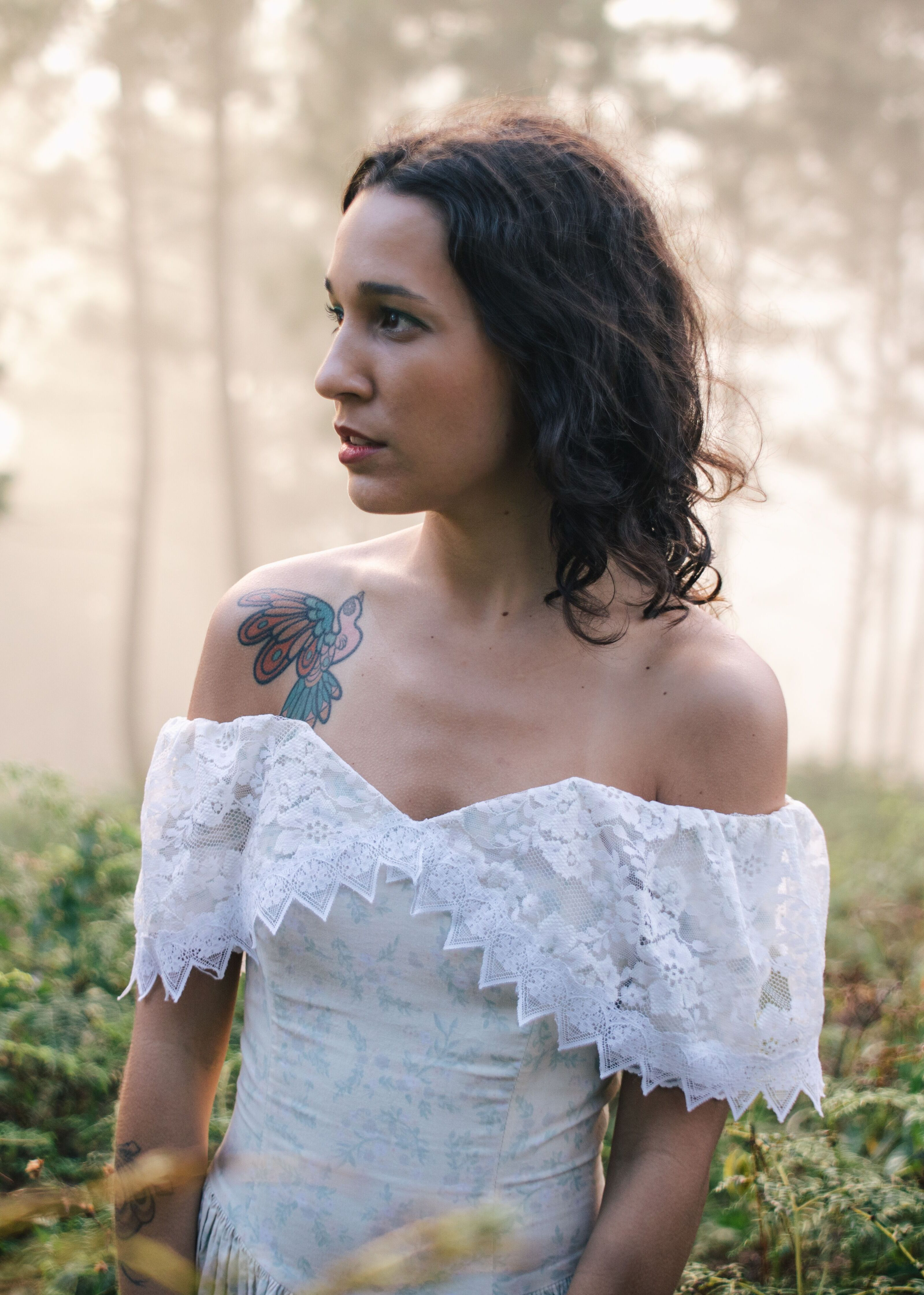
- Ile in 2017

Background information
- Also known as: PG-13
- Born: Ileana Mercedes Cabra Joglar; April 28, 1989 (age 37); Hato Rey, San Juan, Puerto Rico
- Genres: Bolero; world; urban
- Occupations: Singer; songwriter
- Instrument: Vocals
- Years active: 2004–present
- Label: Sony Music Latin
- Member of: Calle 13
- Website: ile.komi.io

Ileana Mercedes Cabra Joglar (Latin American Spanish: [ileˈana meɾˈseðes ˈkaβɾa xoˈɣlaɾ]; born April 28, 1989), known professionally as Ile (stylized as iLe), is a Puerto Rican singer and songwriter. She began her musical career during her teenage years as a backing vocalist for Calle 13 under the stage name PG-13, a group she took part in for 10 years alongside her brothers René Pérez Joglar (Residente) and Eduardo Cabra Martínez (Visitante).

Her debut solo album, Ilevitable was released in June 2016. It won a Grammy in the category Best Latin Rock, Urban or Alternative Album in 2017. For it, Ile was also nominated for the Latin Grammy Awards as "Best New Artist".

Ile has performed in Puerto Rico, the United States, and Europe.

== Background and artistic beginnings ==
Ileana Mercedes Cabra Joglar is the daughter of Flor Joglar de Gracia, an actress who formed part of the theatre troupe Teatro del Sesenta. Her father, José Cabra González is a creative advertiser and musician. From a very young age, Cabra showed great interest in music. She began to sing even while still learning how to speak, phonetically imitating the voices of famous singers or movie soundtracks that appealed to her. During this time, she would often sing at private parties and family gatherings. Her early exposure to music through her family and informal performances preceded her later involvement in professional music.

While attending Josefita Monserrate de Sellés elementary school, she joined the School Choir and the Handbell Choir headed by Evangeline Oliver. For eight years, she studied piano at El Conservatorio de Música de Puerto Rico. Cabra inherited her voice from her mother and her grandmother, Flor Amelia de Gracia, teacher, and composer, who is also featured on the back cover of Calle 13's self-titled debut album. At age 16, as a second year high school student, her brother Residente picked her up one day after class and asked her to sing "La Aguacatona", a song he had written for a demo he was working on with her brother Visitante. She began to take private singing lessons with renowned Puerto Rican soprano Hilda Ramos and then additional vocal studies with Cuban singer Gema Corredera, a member of the group Gema y Pavel.

== Calle 13 ==
=== Early years ===
From that point on, she began to collaborate as a vocalist for her brothers' new musical project. "La Aguacatona" caught the attention of White Lion Records. After recording a second song, "La Tribu", she was immediately nicknamed PG-13 by her cousin Ian Marcel Cardozo Joglar, since she was under-aged at the time, she joined the group and PG-13 is normally used to classify movies that require parental guidance for children under 13.

During 2005, she was active in the late-night circuit of shows and presentations in various venues throughout the island, which would help give form and structure to what was to become Calle 13. At only 16 years of age, she found herself singing on stage in front of thousands at the Coliseo de Puerto Rico José Miguel Agrelot, as part of Calle 13's first concert. She chose to interpret "Puro Teatro", a song previously recorded by La Lupe, which is one of her favorite artists.

On May 2, 2009, Calle 13 performed once again at the Coliseo de Puerto Rico José Miguel Agrelot for the release of their third album Los de Atrás Vienen Conmigo. "In The Heights" playwright Lin-Manuel Miranda was invited to make an appearance after Residente had seen his acceptance speech for Best Original Score at the 62nd Tony Awards. Backstage, Flor Joglar de Gracia, mother of Ile and Residente, revealed to Miranda their connection to Gilberto Concepción de Gracia, founder of the Puerto Rican Independence Party. Miranda and Residente have since confirmed their family relation through social media.

PG-13 continued traveling with Calle 13 during her junior year of high school. At that time, she had the opportunity to visit other countries and share the stage with some of her most admired artists, such as Gustavo Santaolalla, Kevin Johansen, and Susana Baca.

=== Latin Grammy Awards performances ===
When she was 18, PG-13 sang at the 8th Annual Latin Grammy Awards presentation held at the Mandalay Bay in Las Vegas, as part of Calle 13's interpretation of "Pa'l Norte" which opened with PG-13 performing a solo a cappella.

In November 2011, Calle 13 opened the Gala at the 12th edition of the Latin Grammy Awards with the theme "Latinoamérica" performed with a symphony orchestra arrangement by Alex Berti and conducted by Musical Director Gustavo Dudamel. According to Latino Fox News, PG-13's high notes left everyone in silence.

== Solo career ==
=== First steps ===
By the end of 2012, she participated in the traditional Banco Popular TV Christmas Special which has been produced and transmitted each year since 1993. On this occasion, for the special "Hecho con Sabor a Puerto Rico" Cabra had an impressive performance singing "La Pared" which was described by the Diario of NY as "superb" 4 La Pared is one of the first successful songs written by Puerto Rican composer Roberto Angleró.

=== Collaborations ===
In 2010, Kevin Johansen invited Cabra as a guest performer during his presentation at the Buenos Aires National Theatre where together they sang "Logo," a song included in Johansen's repertoire and recording; The Nada Liniers: Live in Buenos Aires.

In 2012, boxing champion Miguel Cotto chose Cabra to sing the Puerto Rican National Anthem during the introduction ceremony prior to his fight against Floyd Mayweather Jr. Her interpretation was widely acclaimed, including by the legendary Bob Dylan, who in 2015 mentioned her in his MusiCares Person of the Year speech: "I was in a boxing match a few years ago watching Floyd Mayweather fight a boxer from Puerto Rico and someone sang the Puerto Rican national anthem. And it was beautiful, it was heartfelt, it was moving".

In 2014, she collaborated with Gustavo Cordera on the theme "Estoy Real" for the "Cordera Vivo" production, which was recorded at La Trastienda Club in Buenos Aires, Argentina. One year later, in 2015, she was invited by Jorge Drexler to sing on stage the song "Olas y Arena" by Puerto Rican composer Sylvia Rexach during Drexler's concert in Puerto Rico as part of the Uruguayan singer's tour.

In 2017, she guests sang on "Hijos del Canãveral", the closing track of her brother's debut solo album.

In March 2022, she was featured on a single by Adrian Quesada called “Mentiras con Cariño."

== Ile ==
In August 2015, Cabra announced that she was changing her stage name to Ile and was working on her first solo album. The recording took place during that entire year under the production of Ile and Ismael Cancel.

=== Ilevitable ===
In May 2016, Ilevitable was released to the praise of critics and peers. According to NPR "the album established her immediately as a first-class interpreter of the classic sounds that flow through Latin America." Jon Pareles of The New York Times described it as "a knowingly retro survey of Latin music's past, full of romance and a longing that can turn despondent. She sings richly orchestrated boleros, delicate ballads and percussive boogaloo and mambo, without a hint of either irony or naïveté."

Some of Puerto Rico's most prominent musicians collaborated on the album: Piro Rodríguez, Charlie Sepulveda, Bayrex Jiménez, Eduardo Cabra, Fofé Abreu from Circo, Louis García and the late Cheo Feliciano in one of his last recordings ever.

The first single released was "Caníbal" and it was accompanied by a dramatic video directed by Argentinian Juan Manuel Costa. The video was described as an "animated Frida Kahlo painting" and was positively reviewed. Her second single and video, "Te Quiero Con Bugalú," was released on July 7.

Also in July 2016, Ile embarked on her first tour with her new band, performing the songs from iLevitable. On July 7, she performed at the Highline Ballroom as part of the Latin Alternative Music Conference Official Showcase. July 8 she performed her first solo show outside of Puerto Rico—live at SOB's, also in New York. Later that month she participated in the Nuevofest in Philadelphia and in the Millennium Park Summer Series in Chicago. August 4 Ile performed at the Lincoln Center Out of Doors series, presented and recorded by NPR.

In September 2016, The Recording Academy nominated Ile for her first Latin Grammy as Best New Artist.

In February 2017, Ilevitable won a Grammy Award for Best Latin Rock, Urban or Alternative Album.

=== Almadura ===
On May 20, 2019, Ile released her sophomore album, Almadura, a title that literally translates to "strong soul" and is a play on words of the Spanish word for "armor" ("armadura"). The album contains modern and electronic takes on Puerto Rican and other Caribbean musical styles and folklore, referencing traditional musical genres like bomba and featuring artists like jazz and salsa pianist Eddie Palmieri.

Almadura not only reflects on Puerto Rico's cultural roots but on its present and future, as well, notably in the wake of Hurricane Maria. The video for the lead single, "Odio," reenacts the Cerro Maravilla murders as a message of empowerment and solidarity in response to the aftermath of the storm.

In a year-end essay for Slate, Ann Powers cited Almadura as proof that the format is not dead but rather undergoing a "metamorphosis", with artists such as iLe utilizing the concept album through the culturally relevant autobiographical narratives.

=== Nacarile ===
Her third album, Nacarile, was released on October 21, 2022.

The album incorporates iLe's love of traditional Latin American music, Puerto Rican folk percussion, and hip-hop. Additionally, Nacarile also fuses new genres by combining astral synths, irreverent art pop, and prismatic melodies.

=== Como Las Canto Yo ===
On October 24, 2025, iLe released her fourth album, Como Las Canto Yo, through the La Buena Fortuna label.

== Social movement soundtrack ==
A song, "Afilando los cuchillos" (English transl. "Sharpening the Knives"), with lyrics by Bad Bunny, Residente, and iLe, was released during the Telegramgate protests.
