= Residente (album) =

Studio album by Residente
- Released: March 31, 2017
- Recorded: 2016–2017
- Studio: Various: Electric Lady Studios; (New York City, United States); Shyaanam Studio; (Kyzyl, Siberia); Tweak Tone Labs; (Beijing, China); Temple Church; (London, United Kingdom); Palau De La Música; (Barcelona, Spain); Tone Hall Studios; (Accra, Ghana); Tamma Cultural Troupe; (Tamale, Ghana); Les Studios; (Seydoni, Burkina Faso); MSS Radio Studio; (North Ossetia); Church of the Nativity of the Blessed Virgin Mary; (South Ossetia); Bravo Records – Sound Recording Studio; (Georgia); Playbach Recording Studio; (San Juan, Puerto Rico)
- Genres: Alternative hip hop; urban; world
- Length: 54:09
- Languages: Spanish; French; English; Chinese
- Label: Sony Latin
- Producer: Residente

Residente chronology
Residente (2017)	Las Letras Ya No Importan (2024)

Singles from Residente
- 1. "Somos Anormales" Released: January 13, 2017; 2. "Desencuentro" Released: March 24, 2017

Residente (stylized as Resīdεntә) is the debut solo album from Puerto Rican rapper of same name, released on March 31, 2017, by Sony Music Latin during the hiatus of his main band Calle 13.

Following a DNA test which revealed that he descends from people of multiple parts of the world, Residente felt inspired to visit those locations and record with local musicians. The trips resulted in a 13-track album, two of which ("Somos Anormales" and "Desencuentro") were released as singles and received promotional videos. The Album won Grammy Award for Best Latin Rock, Urban or Alternative Album at the 60th Annual Grammy Awards.

A documentary and book (both homonymous to the album) were also prepared based on his journey. A world tour followed the album's release with shows in France, Germany, Spain, Denmark, Switzerland, Netherlands, Argentina, Chile, Mexico and Puerto Rico.

The album debuted at number 3 on the US Billboard Top Latin Albums chart and number 1 on the World Albums chart with 4,000 album-equivalent units.

== Background and production ==
A few years before the album's release, Residente took a DNA test that revealed his roots trace back to 10 different locations around the world, including Armenia, Ghana, China, and his homeland, Puerto Rico. Such diversity inspired him to produce what would later result in a solo album, a documentary and a book released via Fusion Media Group (Univision Communications) under the same common title Residente. He signed a five-year production deal with the label.

The album was written and recorded over the course of two years and saw Residente travel around the world to the places where his roots are, including Siberia, Moscow, China, the Caucasus, France, Spain, England, Armenia, Ossetia in Georgia, Antigua, Ghana, Burkina Faso, and Niger, aside from Puerto Rico.

In all these places, he worked with local, mostly amateur or unknown artists, some of whom were poor or affected by war. Despite this, Residente rejects the idea of it being a world music album because he "wanted to do something new". All of the artists would be paid for their royalties. He also said:

I collaborated with talented artists, artists that the musical industry doesn't know of because they don't pay attention to them, artists that make music without expecting something in return, artists whom I share DNA with, just how they shared their stories with me.

About the album's general sound, he said, "at a sound level it is not the most organic [album he's ever made], but the most real and precise. All sounds are from those countries, the drums, the voices, anything that sounds comes from that place."

Parts of the pre and post-production of the album were done at Loisaida Center in New York City. Residente also worked at Electric Lady Studios in West Village.

The album deals with themes such as equality and unity. Though Residente's initial approach to his trips were mainly musical, he was inspired by his conversations to focus on the subject of race. Despite being produced much before Donald Trump won the 2016 United States presidential elections, Residente admits its themes could relate to the scenario of the time of its release: "I think that... the topic now is even more relevant because of what is happening with Trump and not only Trump, because there's a lot of racism around the world. [...] We all came from the same place, even though we are different, we are equally different".

Residente intends to release an English language version of the album and has already translated all lyrics with the help of Puerto Rican poet Urayoán Noel, associate professor at New York University. The effort will be put out depending on Residente's satisfaction with it.

== Song information ==
Lin-Manuel Miranda, Residente's distant cousin, guest performs on the album's opening track "Intro ADN/DNA" and narrates how both discovered their relationship. The second track and first single, "Somos Anormales", was recorded in Kyzyl, Tuva, after a one-week stay. Kyzyl was Residente's first stop in his trip around the world, and 6% of his DNA comes from there. The song has guest performances of Chirgilchin and received a video shot in Spain featuring John Leguizamo, Leonor Watling, Óscar Jaenada and Juan Diego Botto.

The romantic song "Desencuentro" features French indie pop singer SoKo, and talks about two people who are perfect for each other but at the same time are mismatched. About including it on the album, Residente said: "Everything that's in my albums are things that surround me, and this [love] also surrounds me". The song received a video shot at the Crémerie-Restaurant Polidor and featuring Charlotte Le Bon and Édgar Ramírez.

While recording parts for the track "Guerra" at Nagorno-Karabakh, Azerbaijan military forces bombed the region, forcing the musicians to seek a safer location for recording at a church in Ossetia. About the experience, Residente said:

It was tough to meet with the refugees of war and talk to them. And because I had to communicate with a lot of people that speak only one language, it took me a while. Of course music is our universal language, but after these travels, I have a respect for linguistics that I've never had before.

The final version of the song includes drums performed by South Ossetian children, combined with a Georgian bandura and a Chechen choir.

In China, where 6% of his DNA comes from, he worked with a group of Peking opera singers. About the experience, he says:

[...] first of all, it was very difficult to communicate because they couldn't speak English and at that time my English sucked, and my translator, his English was OK, but he wasn't like (an) English professor, so it took us awhile to get there and to translate first the lyrics... from Spanish to English, and then from English to Chinese.

He mixed their voices with two organs, one from Temple Church in London and another from Palau de la Música Catalana in Barcelona. The resulting work became the song "Apocalíptico", inspired by Beijing's "choking pollution and the juxtaposition of modern buildings and a crumbling past".

In Africa, responsible for 10% of his DNA, he went to Burkina Faso, where he drew inspiration from Thomas Sankara to create "La Sombra", which features Niger-born Tuareg guitarist Bombino. "Milo" was inspired by a dream Residente had and it was named and written after his son. The song was conceived in Ghana.

The dystopian-like song "El Futuro Es Nuestro" projects a future in which people eat cockroaches and the Moon is no more since terrorists blew it up. It features Goran Bregović and his brass band. "Dagombas en Tamale" features Dagomba tribal singers from Ghana and "celebrates the spirit of the penniless". The closing track "Hijos del Cañaveral", written in Puerto Rico, features vocals by his sister ILE.

== Documentary ==
A self-titled documentary directed by Residente himself was produced simultaneously with the album. It debuted on March 16 at South by Southwest and depicts his childhood, his struggle with attention deficit hyperactivity disorder, his times as a young artist, his rise with Calle 13 and why he decided to leave it and pursue a solo career. It received a favorable review by Michael Rechtshaffen from The Hollywood Reporter. In the week of its premiere, Residente and his solo band performed at the Latino Resist Concert at Lady Bird Lake.

== Reception ==
=== Accolades ===
The album received critical acclaim and some of its songs multiple nominations for the 18th Annual Latin Grammy Awards. The album itself was nominated for Album of the Year and Best Urban Music Album, winning the latter. "Somos Anormales" won the Best Urban Song award, "Dagombas en Tamale" was nominated for Best Urban Fusion/Performance, "Desencuentro" was nominated for Best Short Form Music Video, "Guerra" was nominated for Record of the Year and Song of the Year, "Apocaliptico" was nominated for Best Alternative Song and "Hijos del Cañaveral" was nominated for Best Tropical Song.

The album was elected the best Latin album of 2017 by the critics of Billboard, as well as the 19th best album overall of the same year. It was also ranked 38th at Rolling Stone's 50 Best Albums of 2017 list.

== Track listing ==
All tracks are written by Residente, except where noted.

No.	Title	Length
1.	"Intro ADN / DNA" (featuring Lin-Manuel Miranda)	1:40
2.	"Somos Anormales" (We Are Abnormal)	3:38
3.	"Interludio Entre Montañas Siberianas" (Interlude Between Siberian Mountains)	2:22
4.	"Una Leyenda China" (A Chinese Legend)	4:29
5.	"Interludio Haruna Fati" (Haruna Fati Interlude)	0:40
6.	"Dagombas en Tamale" (Dagombas in Tamale)	3:55
7.	"Desencuentro" (featuring SoKo; written by René Pérez, Francis Pérez and SoKo)	4:44
8.	"Guerra" (War)	5:34
9.	"Apocalíptico" (Apocalyptic)	6:12
10.	"La Sombra" (The Shadow; featuring Bombino)	4:04
11.	"Milo"	6:03
12.	"El Futuro es Nuestro" (The Future Is Ours; featuring Goran Bregović)	4:26
13.	"Hijos del Cañaveral" (Children of the Canebrake; featuring Francisco "Cholo" Rosario)	6:22
Total length:		54:09

== Personnel ==
- Residente – vocals, producer, songwriting (all tracks)
- Trooko – producer, programming (all tracks)
- Omar Rodríguez-López – electric guitar (all tracks)
- Ted Jensen – Mastering (all tracks)
- Lin-Manuel Miranda – vocals (track 1)
- Rafael Arcaute – producer, co-composer, additional engineering, additional programming (track 2, 4, 6–9, 11)
- Igor Koshkendey – backing vocals, doshpuluur (track 2–3)
- Mongun-ool Ondar – backing vocals (track 2–3)
- Aidysmaa Koshkendey – backing vocals (track 2–3)
- Aldar Tamdyn – backing vocals (track 3)
- Brandon Bost – audio engineering (track 2), mixing assistant (track 4), assistant engineering (track 7–13)
- Barry McCready – assistant engineering (track 2, 4, 6–13)
- Gosha Usov – assistant engineering (track 2, 6–9, 11–12)
- Phil Joly – recording engineering (track 2, 4, 6, 8, 10–13)
- Tom Elmhirst – mixing engineering (track 2, 4, 6–13)
- Pan Xiaojia – vocals (track 4)
- Jin Jiujie – vocals (track 4)
- Li Yang – luo drums (track 4)
- Xu Ziling – guzheng, erhu (track 4)
- Beatriz Artola – engineering (track 4, 6, 9–11)
- Haruna Fati – vocals (track 5–6)
- Kofo – vocals (track 6, 11)
- Dela Botri – percussion (track 6), flute (track 11)
- Tamma Cultural Troupe – percussion (track 6)
- La Tortuga China – composer, writer (track 7)
- Brandee Younger – harp (track 7)
- Felipe Rodríguez – piccolo trumpet (track 7)
- Anthony Calderón – french horn (track 7, 13)
- Harry Almodóvar – cello (track 7, 11, 13)
- María Santiago – viola (track 7)
- Gretchen O'Mahoney – violin (track 7, 11, 13)
- Alexis Velázquez – violin (track 7, 11, 13)
- Tony Royster, Jr. – drums (track 7, 8)
- Leo Genovese – piano (track 7)
- DJ Kraze – scratching (track 7)
- Harold Wendell Sanders – assistant engineering (track 7)
- Irakli Akhalaia –panduri (track 8)
- St. Mary's Church, Tskhinvali – choir (track 8)
- Aznash Ensemble – choir (track 8)
- Rhythms of the Mountains – percussion (track 8)
- Darejan Margoshvili – vocals (track 8)
- Nato Mutoshvili – vocals (track 8)
- Rusudan Pareulidze – vocals (track 8)
- Manana Alkhanashvili – vocals (track 8)
- Alex Berdz – engineering (track 8)
- Akihiro Nishimura – engineering (track 7–8)
- Juan Camilo Arboleda – musical arranger (track 8)
- Julio Reyes Copello – musical arranger (track 8)
- Duan Ya Wen – vocals (track 9)
- Tang Tian – backing vocals (track 9)
- Juan De La Rubia – pipe organ (track 9)
- Roger Sayer – pipe organ (track 9)
- Edgar Abraham – musical arranger (track 7, 9, 11, 13)
- Bombino – vocals, guitar (track 10)
- Henry Cole – drums (track 10, 12)
- Panagiotis Andreou – bass (track 10)
- Supa Saï – engineering (track 10)
- Nyornuwofia Agrosor – vocals (track 11)
- Meg Gbrindey Adom – vocals (track 11)
- Edgard Marrero – viola (track 11, 13)
- Hubert Kofu Anti – engineering (track 11)
- Daniela Radkova – vocals (track 12)
- Lyudmila Radkova – vocals (track 12)
- Ogi Radivojevic – engineering (track 12)
- Seth Paris – engineering (track 12–13)
- Goran Bregović – guitar, co-writer, producer (track 12)
- ILE – vocals (track 13)
- Francisco "Cholo" Rosario – vocals (track 13)
- Luis Sanz – cuatro (track 13)
- Héctor Meléndez – acoustic guitar (track 12–13)
- Neftalí Ortiz – güiro (track 13)
- Anthony Carrillo – bongo (track 13)
- Daniel Díaz – percussion (track 13)
- Carlos Velazquez – engineering (track 13)

== Charts ==
=== Weekly charts ===
Chart (2017)	Peak position
US Top Latin Albums (Billboard)	3
US World Albums (Billboard)	1

=== Year-end charts ===
Chart (2017)	Position
US Latin Albums (Billboard)	83
US World Albums (Billboard)	14
