= Residente o Visitante =

Studio album by Calle 13
- Released: April 24, 2007
- Recorded: Atlanta, Georgia, Miami, Florida.US
- Genres: Alternative rap; reggaetón
- Length: 60:20
- Language: Spanish
- Label: Sony BMG
- Producers: Elías de León & Visitante

Calle 13 chronology
| Calle 13 (2005) | Residente o Visitante (2007) | Los de Atrás Vienen Conmigo (2008) |

Singles from Residente o Visitante
- 1. "Tango del Pecado" Released: March 27, 2007; 2. "La Cumbia de los Aburridos" Released: July 2007; 3. "Pa'l Norte" Released: November 2007; 4. "Un Beso de Desayuno" Released: 2008

Residente o Visitante (Resident or Visitor) is the second studio album by Puerto Rican urban/hip hop band Calle 13, released on April 24, 2007, by Sony BMG. Recorded in various countries while on tour in promotion of the duo's debut album Calle 13, Residente o Visitante marked an evolution in the band's musical and lyrical style. While writing the album, the duo took a trip to South America to explore areas populated by Latin America's indigenous and African-descended minorities, a journey that greatly influenced the music on Residente o Visitante. The album features six guest artists and delves into genres such as tango, bossa nova, cumbia, and electronica.

Residente o Visitante debuted at number one on the US Billboard Top Latin Albums chart, selling 12,000 copies in its first week. The record was also certified Gold in Argentina by the Argentine Chamber of Phonograms and Videograms Producers (CAPIF). The first single released from the album, "Tango del Pecado", reached number 14 on the Billboard Latin Rhythm Airplay chart. The record received positive reviews from critics, who praised the album's experimental nature and unique lyrical themes. The album also won Best Urban Music Album and Best Urban Song for "Pal' Norte" at the 8th Annual Latin Grammy Awards. A film entitled Sin Mapa documenting the group's travel experiences while recording the album was released on July 29, 2009.

== Background ==
Calle 13 was formed when step-brothers Residente (real name René Pérez Joglar) and Visitante (real name Eduardo José Cabra Martínez) began creating music together in 2004. The step-brothers hosted their music on a website, and began searching for a record label in order to release their music commercially. After giving demo tapes to Carlos "Karly" Rosario an A&R for White Lion Records, the duo was offered a record deal. The duo gained recognition for their controversial song "Querido FBI", which responded to the killing of Filiberto Ojeda Ríos, a key figure for the Puerto Rican independence movement.

Soon after "Querido FBI" gained notoriety for Calle 13, the band's 2005 eponymously titled debut album was released and became commercially and critically successful in Latin America. The group was subsequently labeled as reggaeton, a genre that the duo wished to distance itself from. Visitante commented on the situation: "The truth is that the first record had only four reggaetons. Those were the cuts used for promotional purposes, and so that’s the brand that was put on us. But from the beginning, to me, reggaeton never offered anything musically. My brother liked it, yes, but we always tried to execute it in an organic way, with real instruments and mixing it with other genres."

== Recording ==
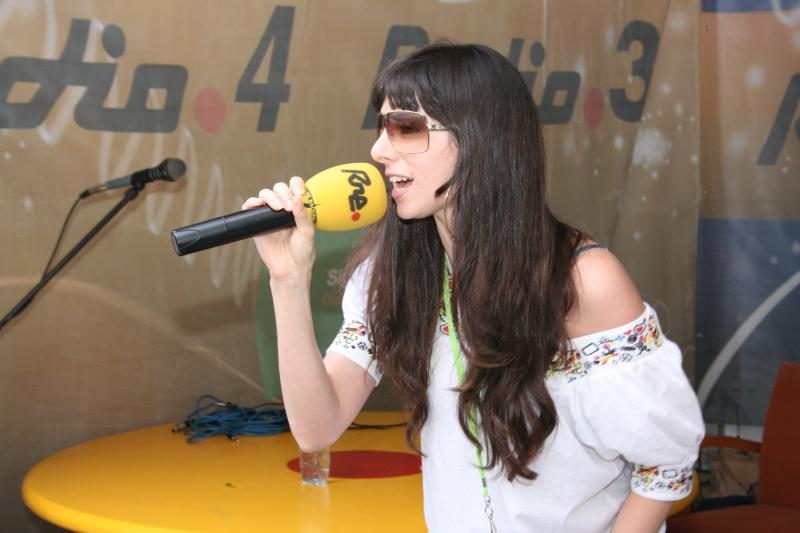
Residente o Visitante features a guest appearance by Spanish rapper La Mala Rodriguez.

While writing Residente o Visitante, the duo took a trip to South America to explore areas populated by Latin America's indigenous and African-descended minorities. Residente reflected on the journey, stating, "We saw horrible things, but also things that were incredibly beautiful. Some of the contrasts are really intense." The duo was strongly influenced by the experience; Visitante discovered and purchased several new musical instruments on the trip including a quijada, a charango and a bombo legüero, all of which were used on the song "Llegale a Mi Guarida". Residente and Visitante felt that writing on the road was conducive to the group's creative output. The group's journeys were documented in a film entitled Sin Mapa, which debuted on July 29, 2009 at the New York International Latino Film Festival and later was released on DVD.

Residente o Visitante was recorded in various countries, as the band was on tour during the making of the album. Residente explained that the group did not feel any pressure to compete with the success of Calle 13, and felt that the recording of Residente o Visitante was a smoother process than the first: "The main difference for us this time around was that we had more opportunities, more tools and more money. We were also on tour at the same time, unlike the first. I spent my time writing during the travels, while my brother would write the music." Residente was invited by La Mala Rodriguez to come to Spain to collaborate on a song. He agreed, as he greatly admired La Mala's work, and the two met for drinks where they discussed the kind of song they wanted to create before going to the studio to record what would later become "Mala Suerta Con el 13".

== Composition ==
=== Music ===
"Tango del Pecado"
The album's first single, "Tango del Pecado", mixes the tango and reggaeton music genres. The song features Argentinean producer Gustavo Santaolalla and lyrically focuses on Residente's controversial relationship with former Miss Universe Denise Quiñones.

"Un Beso de Desayuno"
"Un Beso de Desayuno" features the band experimenting with bossa nova and electronica music. The song's electronic elements helped to create a "warped" sound.

On the record, the band wished to experiment more with live instruments and diverse styles of music. Margarita Diaz of NY Daily News referred to Residente o Visitante as "an exhilarating travelogue through the sounds and rhythms of [South America]." Visitante, who composed the music on the album, credits the musical diversity to his past. He began playing classical piano at age six, and at age 17, he joined a varied array of bands and played saxophone and keyboards. Residente o Visitante features more guest artists than the band's debut, including collaborations with musicians such as Tego Calderón, La Mala Rodríguez and Orishas. Andrew Casillas of Stylus Magazine opined that the duo stripped down the trademarks of reggaetón, including its percussion sounds and dembow rhythms, to create "complex song structures all but foreign to mainstream pop."

The introduction to the album, as described by Elijah Wald of the Los Angeles Times, "sounds like a lovely Baroque chorale – unless one speaks Spanish, in which case it becomes immediately evident that it's an ornate canon of the filthiest words in Puerto Rican street slang." "Tango del Pecado" mixes tango and reggaeton, and has been referred to as "tango-tón". The song features Argentinian music producer Gustavo Santaolalla and his Bajofondo Tango Club. Puerto Rican rapper Tego Calderón is featured on "Sin Exagerar", which contains guitar influenced by surf rock. Additionally, the song "Cumbia de los Aburridos" is strongly influenced by Colombian cumbia music, featuring an accordion and a horn section. "Un Beso De Desayuno" mixes electronica, rap and bossa nova.

=== Lyrics ===
Residente described the album as more introspective and autobiographical than its predecessor. With the lyrics on the record, Residente aimed for authenticity, attempting to tackle subjects not typically discussed in conventional reggaeton. He explained that listening to Residente o Visitante is similar to watching a movie, in the sense that the album depicts real life events and uses profanity to evoke emotion in the listener. Leila Cobo of Billboard wrote that the lyrical content of Residente o Visitante ranges from "sophomoric humor to outright perversion". The song "Mala Suerte Con el 13", the group's collaboration with La Mala Rodriguez, is a satire of the "Latin macho attitude". He wished to defy and poke fun at traditional gender roles, citing feminist philosopher Judith Butler as an influence; "I wanted to record a duet between a guy who's weak and inadequate, and a woman who's a sexual psychopath and has all the power in the world. A complete mockery of macho stereotypes". In the same vein, "Sin Exagerar" parodies the misogyny that Residente felt had saturated the reggaeton scene.

The album's lead single, "Tango del Pecado", is addressed to the parents of Residente's then-girlfriend, former Miss Universe Denise Quiñones, who did not approve of the couple's relationship. He explains that the song expresses how he will still date her regardless of their opinions, and author Ed Morales observes that "It's a calling out of the morality of Latin America. It's just an invitation to turn everything upside-down by embracing the ugly and profane in life and, you know, asking people to go on that journey." "Tango del Pecado" also created controversy due to the repeated chanting of "Súbele el volumen a la música satánica" (turn up the satanic music). Residente asserts that he did not add the line to create a reaction, saying, "I never do something expecting something. I do things because I like them." "El Avión Se Cae" depicts the thoughts of a drunken airplane passenger. In "Pal Norte", Residente discusses the plight of immigrants in the United States. Commenting on the track's lyrical themes, he explained "I had wanted to do that theme because I think it is an important topic. And not just for the immigrants in the United States but all over. It is a song that immigrants can identify with, Dominicans as well as Puerto Ricans. All the people leave one country for another for the same reasons." Although much of the album addresses immigration and moving to different countries, "La Crema" is a celebration of living in Puerto Rico.

== Title and artwork ==
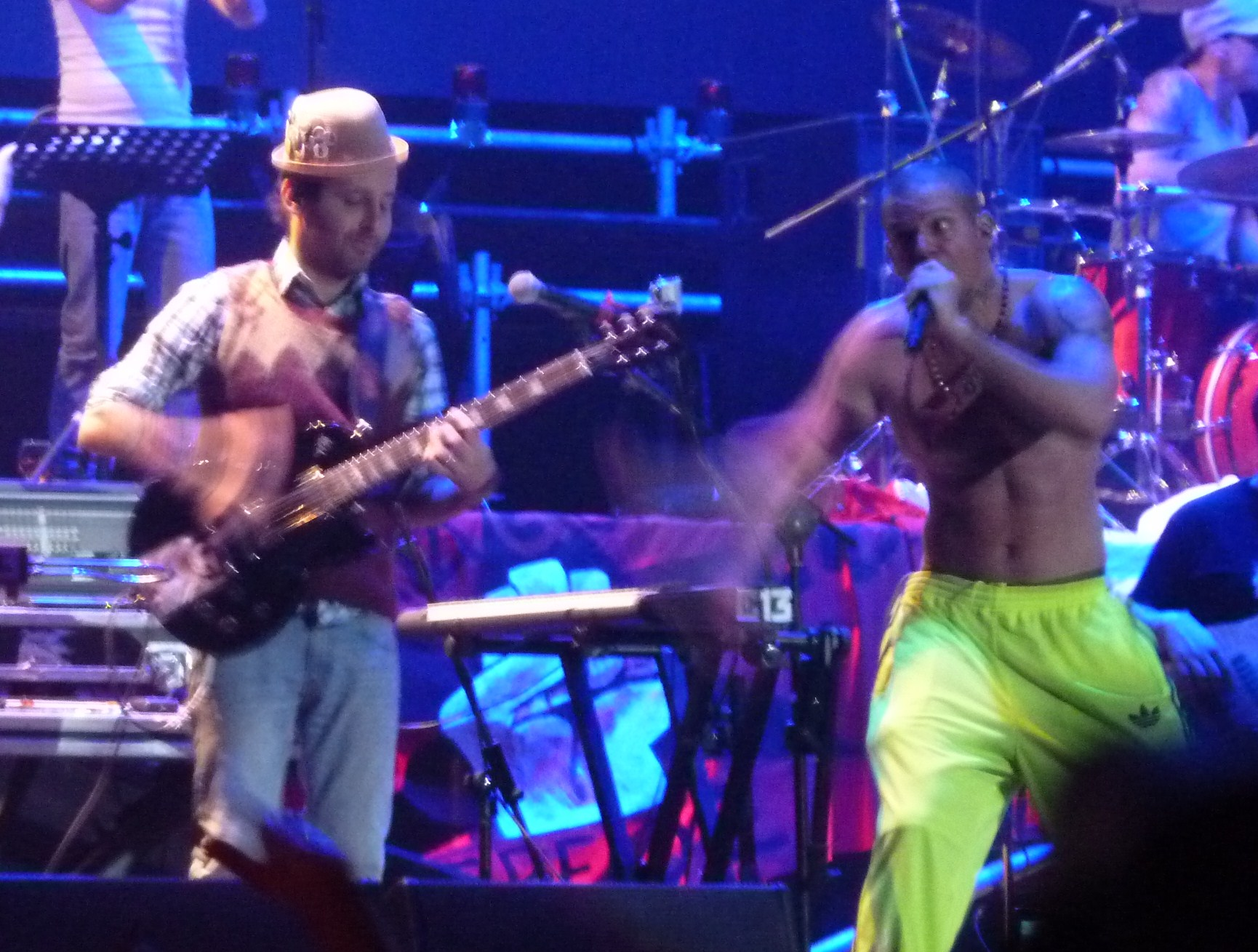
The album's title was inspired by Visitante's (left) experiences of visiting his step-brother Residente (right) as a child.

The album's name was inspired by an experience from Residente and Visitante's childhood. When they were children, Visitante would visit his brother at the Calle 13 (13th Street) of the El Conquistador subsection of Trujillo Alto, Puerto Rico every week. Since the subsection is a gated community, visitors were routinely asked "¿Residente o visitante?" ("Resident or visitor?") by a security guard when approaching the community's main gate. Therefore, Visitante would identify himself as a visitor, while Residente would have to insist that he was a resident to clear the gate. The pair named themselves Calle 13 after the street their family's house was on. The title is also meant to refer to the status of immigrants in the United States, a recurring theme on the record.

The album cover depicts a winged virgin with a canteen on her chest resembling the Sacred Heart of Jesus. Residente noted that the image represents Hispanic immigrants coming to the United States, in an attempt to both sanctify the immigrants and humanize the holy images common in Latin America. An image inside the CD booklet features Residente with stigmata in his hands. He noted that the photo is intended to portray Jesus as a "regular guy" who deals with struggles similar to those of people crossing borders. He further commented, "Obviously, [the art of the CD] is not made for people who are used to seeing the guy with the chick in a bikini in a car with all her jewelry. We don't come here to befuddle the people more."

== Release and reception ==
=== Chart performance ===
Residente o Visitante debuted on the U.S. Billboard Top Latin Albums chart at number one, displacing Jennifer Lopez's Spanish album Como Ama una Mujer, and on the Billboard 200 at number 52, selling about 12,000 copies in its first week. The album remained on the Billboard 200 for a total of four weeks. Additionally, the album debuted on the Billboard Rap Albums chart at number 13. In Argentina, the album was certified Gold by Argentine Chamber of Phonograms and Videograms Producers (CAPIF).

"Tango del Pecado", the first single released from the album, reached number 14 on the Billboard Latin Rhythm Airplay chart. The second single, "Cumbia de los Aburridos", peaked at number 31 on the Billboard Hot Latin Songs chart. "Pa'l Norte", the third single from the record, reached number 27 on the Billboard Hot Latin Songs chart and number 40 on the Regional Mexican Songs chart. The fourth and final single was "Un Beso de Desayuno", which failed to chart.

=== Critical reception ===
Professional ratings
Review scores
| Source | Rating |
|---|---|
| Allmusic | 4/5 stars |
| MSN Music (Consumer Guide) | A− |

The album received positive reviews from critics. Jason Birchmeier of Allmusic gave Residente o Visitante 4 out of 5 stars, noting the disc's diverse musical styles and unique lyricism: "Residente is a gifted rapper who matches Eminem in terms of wit and playfulness while Visitante is a similarly gifted producer who creates multi-layered tracks that rarely sound alike." Andrew Casillas of Stylus Magazine gave the album an A− grade, calling it a "trailblazing record". Casillas praised Residente's rapping on the record, calling his performance "a revelation" and referring to the song "Un Beso de Desayuno" as the band's "most noble achievement: a fully formed reggaetón love song." However, Casillas felt that the album was overly long and stated that "Uiyi Guaye" sounds like "Donald Duck on a treadmill".

Olivia Muñoz of The Philadelphia Inquirer referred to the record as "weird, seductive, thought-provoking and hilarious all at once", and despite noting the unconventional lyrical themes, she deemed many of the songs to be "surprisingly danceable". Phil Freeman of The Village Voice called the album "more thoughtful and musically broad-minded" than its predecessor, and noted that the album gave Residente "a platform for a more explicit political consciousness than some might have predicted", referring to the songs "Pal Norte" and "La Cumbia de los Aburridos". Agustin Gurza of the Los Angeles Times opined that the album is "more mature, though no less outrageous" than the band's debut, and referred to "Tango del Pecado" and "Pal' Norte" as "two of the most memorable songs of the year." Nuria Net of Vibe felt that the "cutting edge appeal" of the debut album was "reduced to vulgar lyrics" on Residente o Visitante, writing, "though this second album shows impressive breadth, swaying from reggaeton to cumbia to tango, Calle 13's powerful social critiques are but a memory."

=== Awards ===
At the 8th Annual Latin Grammy Awards on November 8, 2007 Residente o Visitante received two Latin Grammy Awards: Best Urban Music Album and Best Urban Song for "Pal' Norte". It was also nominated for Album of the Year, and Best Short Form Music Video for the video of the first single "Tango del Pecado". Calle 13 performed at the ceremony in a well-received act featuring Orishas and the Stomp dance troupe. The performance was referred to by Agustin Gurza of the Los Angeles Times as "both a celebratory and seditious moment". In late-2009, the Latin music website Club Fonograma named it the 5th best album of the decade.

== Track listing ==
All lyrics are written by Residente; all music is composed by Visitante. Adapted from Allmusic

| No. | Title | Length |
|---|---|---|
| 1. | "Intro" | 1:48 |
| 2. | "Tango del Pecado" (featuring Bajofondo Tango Club & Panasuyo) | 4:13 |
| 3. | "La Fokin' Moda" | 3:26 |
| 4. | "Sin Exagerar" (featuring Tego Calderón) | 3:26 |
| 5. | "Mala Suerta Con el 13" (featuring La Mala Rodríguez) | 4:30 |
| 6. | "Llégale a Mi Guarida" (featuring Vicentico) | 4:24 |
| 7. | "Un Beso de Desayuno" | 4:51 |
| 8. | "Uiyi Guaye" | 5:05 |
| 9. | "Algo Con-Sentido" | 4:40 |
| 10. | "Pal' Norte" (featuring Orishas) | 4:41 |
| 11. | "La Cumbia de los Aburridos" | 4:07 |
| 12. | "A Limpiar el Sucio" | 4:13 |
| 13. | "El Avión Se Cae" | 4:18 |
| 14. | "La Crema" | 4:01 |
| 15. | "La Era de la Copiaera" | 4:37 |
| Total length: | | 59:80 |

=== Bonus tracks ===
Best Buy Special Edition
| No. | Title | Length |
|---|---|---|
| 16. | "Querido FBI" | 4:28 |
| 17. | "Ley De Gravedad" | 3:21 |

== Chart positions ==
=== Weekly charts ===
| Chart (2007) | Peak position |
|---|---|
| Argetinan Albums (CAPIF) | 7 |
| Ecuadorian Albums (Musicalisimo) | 18 |
| U.S. Billboard 200 | 52 |
| U.S. Billboard Top Latin Albums | 1 |
| U.S. Billboard Top Rap Albums | 13 |
| Venezuelan Albums (Recordland) | 18 |
| Uruguay Album Monthly Charts (CUD) | 8 |

=== Year-end charts ===
| Chart (2007) | Peak position |
|---|---|
| U.S. Billboard Top Latin Albums | 56 |
| U.S. Billboard Latin Rhythm Albums | 10 |

== Album certification ==
| Region | Certification | Certified units/sales |
|---|---|---|
| Argentina (CAPIF) | Gold | 20,000^{^} |
^{^} Shipments figures based on certification alone.

== See also ==
- List of number-one Billboard Top Latin Albums of 2007
- List of number-one Billboard Latin Rhythm Albums of 2007
