= Somos Anormales =

Single by Residente

from the album Residente
- Released: January 13, 2017
- Genre: Tuvan; alternative hip hop
- Length: 3:38
- Label: FMG; UCI
- Songwriter: René Pérez
- Producer: René Pérez

Residente singles chronology
| "Somos Anormales" (2017) | "Desencuentro" (2017) |

Music video
- "Somos Anormales" on YouTube

"Somos Anormales" ("We Are Abnormal") is the debut single by Puerto Rican rapper Residente, released on January 13, 2017, as the first single from his 2017 debut solo album Residente. It won the 2017 Latin Grammy Award for Best Urban Song.

== Composition and lyrics ==
The song was written and recorded in Kyzyl, Tuva, Siberia, where Residente spent one week. It features throat singing band Chirgilchin. According to him, they are singing in Tuvan a concept he originally wrote in Spanish, then translated to English so they could finally translate it to their native language.

According to Residente, "the usage of the term 'abnormal' allowed me to break free from the depreciative connotation of the word to convert it in a inclusive concept. If there is something that we all have in common, is that we are different". In a press release of 2016, Residente told people to "have their eyes, ears and minds open for what is coming".

== Music video ==
The video for the song marks Residente's directional debut and was shot in Madrid, Spain, over the course of four days. It features John Leguizamo, Leonor Watling, Óscar Jaenada and Juan Diego Botto, among 70 others, and was created by Zapatero Film (Puerto Rico) and Deseif Producciones (Spain).

It shows a woman hatching from an egg and giving birth to multiple naked adults with conditions such as dwarfism and albinism. They quickly craft clothes out of wool and divide into two groups, one clean (representing the rich and powerful) and another dirty (representing those who have no money nor power). Both quickly engage in a fight, but they end up turning violence into love. Throughout the video, Residente sings with his head popping out of the woman's vagina.

The scene with the giant vagina expelling people has been compared to a scene in Pedro Almodóvar's Talk to Her, in which Watling was cast. About the video concept, Residente says:

I wanted to talk about the beginning of humanity and how we got here. So it started with an egg because I don't know what happened first – the chicken or the egg? We came from Africa, we came out in all these weird, different shapes and forms – then for some reason we started fighting because we wanted to be the same. Then, while we were fighting, we forgot about what we were fighting about. Then comes that reproductive mud fest that's represented in the video at the end. [...] Also, during this process of humanity they split into the clean ones and the dirty ones; that always happens. The rich ones and the poor ones. Like it is in real life, you have people pushing each other into the mud to stay clean. But then, they all reproduce – clean or dirty, it doesn't matter – they reproduce and now we are here.

Residente also said that the battle scene can be applied to many different contexts of conflicts.

== Charts ==
| Chart (2017) | Peak position |
|---|---|
| US Latin Pop Airplay (Billboard) | 26 |
| US Latin Rhythm Airplay (Billboard) | 16 |
