= Desencuentro (song) =

Single by Residente featuring Soko

from the album Residente
- Released: March 24, 2017
- Genre: Pop; chanson
- Length: 4:44
- Label: FMG; UCI
- Songwriter(s): René Pérez
- Producer(s): René Pérez

Residente featuring Soko singles chronology
"Somos Anormales" (2017)	"Desencuentro" (2017)	"Mis Disculpas" (2017)

Music video
- "Desencuentro" on YouTube

"Desencuentro" is the second single by Puerto Rican rapper Residente, released on March 24, 2017, as the second single from his 2017 debut solo album Residente. It features French indie pop singer Soko and was nominated for the 2017 Latin Grammy Award for Best Short Form Music Video.

== Composition and lyrics ==
The song features the usage of violins, violas, cellos, harps, piccolo, guitars and a French horn. It was composed by Residente, Francis Pérez and SoKo and it tells the story "of two people that are perfect to each other but, at the same time, a mismatch":

It can be your soulmate, but they are in different orbits. Even if they know each other, they live in a mismatch. The same thing happens between the people we know, the countries, and the moments in general. Disagreement can exist in so many things.

It was the first song to be written for the album, before Residente started his trip around the world. He said of the song: "Everything that's in my albums are things that surround me, and this [love] also surrounds me. Human relationships, relationships as a couple -- it's something that affects me and that I like."

== Music video ==
The single received a promotional video shot in the iconic bistro Crémerie-Restaurant Polidor in Paris and produced by Iconoclast (France) and La Tara (Puerto Rico). It stars Charlotte Le Bon and Édgar Ramírez as a woman and a man inside a restaurant who take long to meet due to a series of accidental events.

Residente chose France to be the setting of his video because he felt connected to it, since his DNA partially comes from there, and also because it is the country of love but such image has come in conflict with recent terrorist attacks.

== Charts ==
Chart (2017)	Peak position
US Latin Airplay (Billboard)	26
US Latin Rhythm Airplay (Billboard)	14
US Latin Pop Airplay (Billboard)	23
