= Latinoamérica (song) =

Single by Calle 13 featuring Susana Baca, Totó la Momposina and Maria Rita

from the album Entren Los Que Quieran
- Released: September 27, 2011
- Length: 4:58
- Label: Sony Latin
- Songwriters: Eduardo Cabra; René Pérez; Rafael Arcaute
- Producers: Rafael Arcaute; Calle 13

Calle 13 featuring Susana Baca, Totó la Momposina and Maria Rita singles chronology
"Muerte en Hawáii" (2011)	"Latinoamérica" (2011)

Music video
- "Latinoamérica" on YouTube

"Latinoamérica" is a song by Puerto Rican alternative hip hop band Calle 13. It was released on September 27, 2011 as the fifth single from their fourth studio album, Entren Los Que Quieran (2010). It was written and produced by Rafael Arcaute and Calle 13, and features additional vocals from other Latinoamerican recording artists. These artists include Peruvian Susana Baca, Colombian Totó la Momposina and Brazilian Maria Rita. The song won Record of the Year and Song of the Year in the Latin Grammy Awards of 2011. The song is important in that it touches on many underlying historical, social, and political themes present throughout Latin America.

== Background ==
Calle 13 is well known for their creation of music with strong themes and agendas, particularly music focused on social consciousness. The band has also released a documentary, Sin Mapa. Sin Mapa follows the evolution of Calle 13 as its two main members, stepbrothers Residente (René Pérez Joglar) and Visitante (Eduardo José Cabra Martínez), travel across Latin America. Sin Mapa presents many of the same issues highlighted in "Latinoamérica". "Latinoamérica"'s reflection on historical, social, and political themes acts as a criticism of Western force and influence within Latin America, while at the same time asserting the collective strength of the Latin American oppressed. In addressing the shared history of Latin America, the band exposes the faults that are still a factor in present-day Latin America. It was produced by Peruvian production company Patria

== Music video ==
The music video for Latinoamérica was filmed in March, over the course of twenty-one days, in Peru. It was directed by Jorge Carmona and Milovan Radovic. In addition to the new footage shot throughout Latin America, the music video incorporates previously unused footage shot by the brothers from their pivotal trip captured in Sin Mapa. The video opens to a striking landscape of Peruvian mountains, as the silhouettes of Residente and Visitante are seen crossing the frame.

The stepbrothers make their way up dirt roads, to a radio station in the Peruvian mountains, where they are presented to a Quechua-speaking DJ.

As the video continues, additional symbolism becomes apparent. The start of the song’s instrumental music contains percussion reminiscent of the sound of heartbeats. The audio image of heartbeats is then synchronized to a large visual image of a beating heart.

In the remainder of "Latinoamérica"'s music video there is a wide variety of interesting symbols that play off the song’s lyrics. Nevertheless, for the most part these symbols ultimately tie back to the themes of unity and knowledge.

== Musical composition ==
The song primarily incorporates the Argentine Chacarera, which is a style with 6/8 meter and syncopated drum patterns.

== Critical reception ==
"Latinoamérica" received wide critical acclaim for its social and cultural depth. Calle 13 was nominated for 10 Latin Grammys in 2011, including Song of the Year and Record of the Year for "Latinoamérica". The group won both awards, along with seven additional categories, becoming the record-holders for the most Latin Grammy wins in a single year.

In 2025, the Spanish edition of Rolling Stone placed "Latinoamérica" at number one on its list of the 100 Greatest Songs of the 21st Century in Spanish, highlighting its lasting cultural and artistic impact.

== Certifications ==
Certifications for "Latinoamerica"
Region	Certification	Certified units/sales
Spain (Promusicae)	Gold	30,000^{‡}
^{‡} Sales+streaming figures based on certification alone.
