= Residente =

Puerto Rican rapper (born 1978)

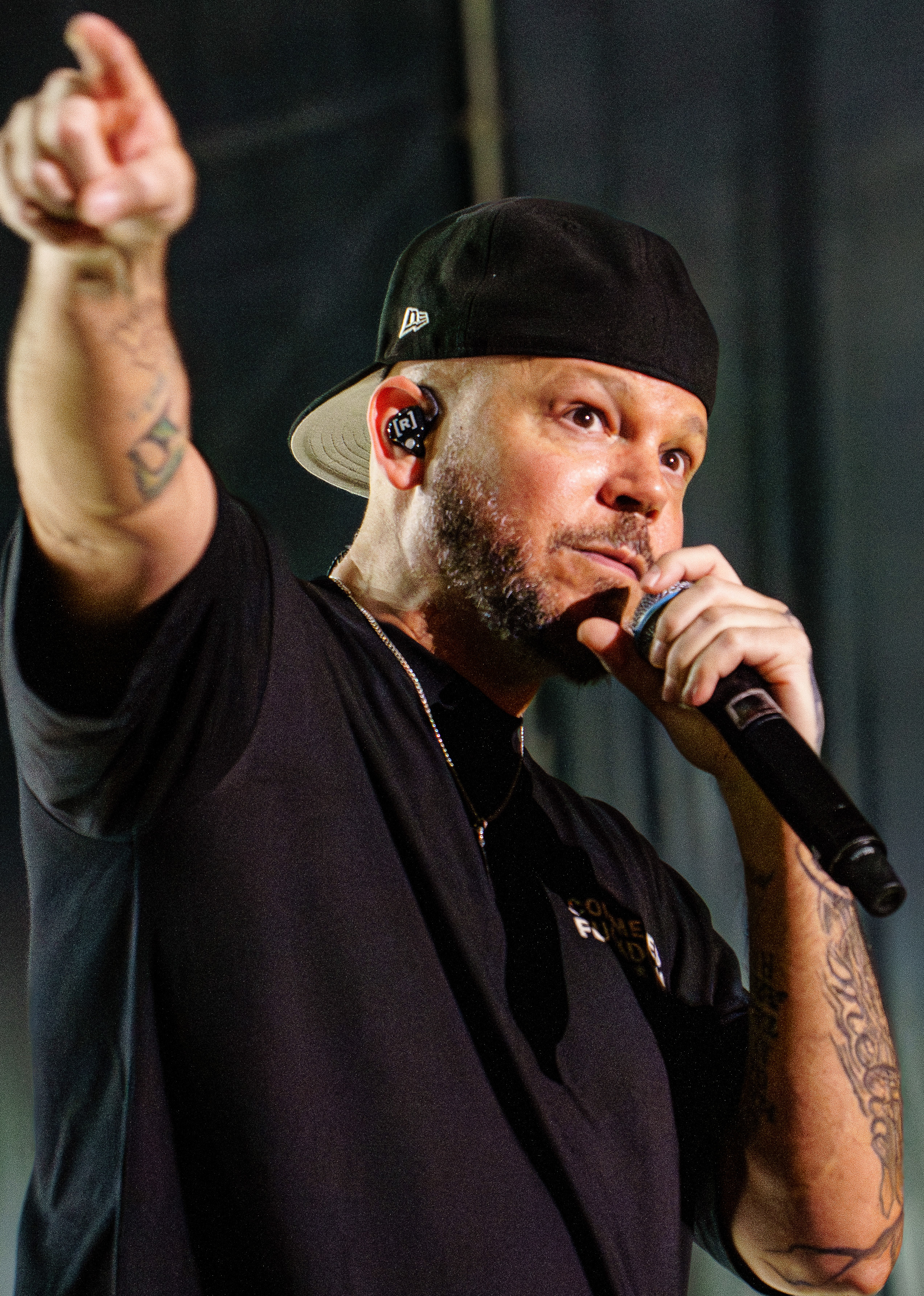
- Residente in 2025
- Born: René Pérez Joglar; February 23, 1978 (age 48); Hato Rey, San Juan, Puerto Rico
- Education: Savannah College of Art and Design
- Occupations: Rapper; songwriter
- Years active: 2004–present
- Spouse: Soledad Fandiño (m. 2013; div. 2017)
- Partners: Denise Quiñones (2006–2009); Kasia Marciniak (2017–present)
- Children: 1
- Relatives: Eduardo Cabra (stepbrother); Ileana Cabra (half-sister); Lin-Manuel Miranda (cousin)
- Musical career
- Genres: Alternative hip hop; urban; reggaeton; Latin trap; world; conscious hip-hop
- Label: Sony Latin
- Member of: Calle 13

René Pérez Joglar (Latin American Spanish: [reˈne ˈpeɾes xoˈɣlaɾ]; born February 23, 1978), known professionally as Residente (often stylized as Resīdɛntə), is a Puerto Rican rapper. He is best known as one of the founders of the alternative rap band Calle 13. Residente released five albums with Calle 13 before announcing his solo career in 2015. Residente released his debut solo album in 2017. He has won four Grammy Awards and 29 Latin Grammy Awards—more than any other Latin artist. Residente has also delved into producing documentaries including Sin Mapa (2009) and Residente (2017) and has directed some of his own music videos.

Born and raised in San Juan, Puerto Rico, Residente developed an interest in art, music, and left-wing politics at an early age. He studied art at the Savannah College of Art and Design in Savannah, Georgia, returning to Puerto Rico in 2003 to work on music with his step-brother, Visitante, with whom he formed Calle 13. Early in his career, his sarcastic and self-deprecating lyrical style garnered both praise and controversy. The group recorded five critically and commercially successful albums. His album Residente was inspired by a genealogical DNA test the artist took to learn about his background, and was recorded in various countries around the world featuring a wide range of international musical styles. He has since released the singles "Sexo" in 2018, "Bellacoso" (with Bad Bunny) in 2019, and "René" in 2020.

He has been recognized for his social contributions and serves as the face of campaigns for UNICEF and Amnesty International. He has consistently defended education in Latin America and the rights of indigenous peoples. In 2009 he criticized the governor of Puerto Rico Luis Fortuño for laying off more than 30,000 public employees. In November 2015, Residente received a recognition award in Barcelona at the World Summit of Nobel Peace Laureates forum due to his commitment to social awareness and for promoting peace.

== Early life and education ==
René Pérez Joglar was born in a hospital in Hato Rey, a sector within the San Juan area. His mother, Flor Joglar de García, is an actress who was part of the theatrical company called Teatro del 60 (Theater of the 60s). In her student years, she belonged to Juventud Independentista Universitaria or JIU (Independentist Youth of the university). René's father, Reinaldo Pérez Ramírez, is a labor lawyer, musician and writer. He studied in the Escuela Libre de Música (Free School of Music). When he was 17, together with Louis García, a trombonist and arranger, they founded the band, Latin Tempo. Reinaldo studied Political Science and Law at the University of Puerto Rico with the idea of contributing to the Independence of Puerto Rico. While he was studying Political Science, he became the president of the Juventud Independentista Universitaria (JIU). Immediately after he graduated from the School of Law, he founded a law firm dedicated to representing labor unions. In 1978, he traveled to Cuba as a representative of the youth of Puerto Rico and a member of the Partido Socialista Puertorriqueño or PSP (Puerto Rican Socialist Party). In the 1980s, he traveled to Nicaragua during the Sandinista Revolution to show solidarity with other Puerto Ricans.

René grew up in a working middle-class neighborhood in Trujillo Alto with his brothers and mother. He was surrounded by art, music and sports from early life. He taught himself to play the guitar and took saxophone and drum classes. At 12 years old, he was part of the school band as a drummer. Since he was young, his interest for drawing and music was evident, but baseball was always his passion, a sport that he practiced for many years until he finished high school. When he finished school, he had to make the tough decision regarding which path to take and chose the arts. He was admitted to the Escuela de Artes Plásticas (School of Visual Arts) in San Juan, Puerto Rico, where he obtained his Bachelor of Fine Arts degree. He earned a scholarship based on his portfolio and transferred to the Savannah College of Art and Design (SCAD), where he finished his master's degree in fine arts.

While he was studying in Savannah, René created his alias "Residente Calle 13" to relive some memories from his childhood and during his free time began to write poems and rap songs. When he finished his master's degree, he traveled to Barcelona, Spain, with the dream of working there. After failing to find employment, he decided to take film courses because he also loved this form of art. During the time he lived in Spain, he screened a short film he directed while he was a student in the SCAD called S=emp2 or sexo = energía x masa x placer2 (Sex = Energy x Mass x Pleasure2). He presented it in Madrid and won second place in a short film festival of independent films.

When he returned to Puerto Rico, he worked on a variety of art projects. He created illustrations and 3D animations for architects. He also worked as a music video editor. During this period, he started to write again, this time from the capital, Old San Juan. René started to feed his writing with the essence of the boricua (Puerto Rican) life and its lingo. He also connected with the La Perla neighborhood since he lived across from it. All this is reflected in his first album later on. Having reached a better understanding of how and what to write about, René approached his brother, Eduardo Cabra, to help him with the music.

Although many major labels did not pay attention to his music, René continued his search. It was not until one afternoon when René was without food in his refrigerator that he desperately called his brother, Gabriel, who recommended that he present his music to White Lion Records, an independent music company responsible for the success of Tego Calderón. He wrote the song "Tengo Hambre" ("I'm Hungry") during this period. Elías de León, owner of White Lion Records, and his A&R Director, Karly Rosario, were the first visionaries to see René's great potential.

== Career ==
=== 2004–2006: Career beginnings and Calle 13 debut album ===
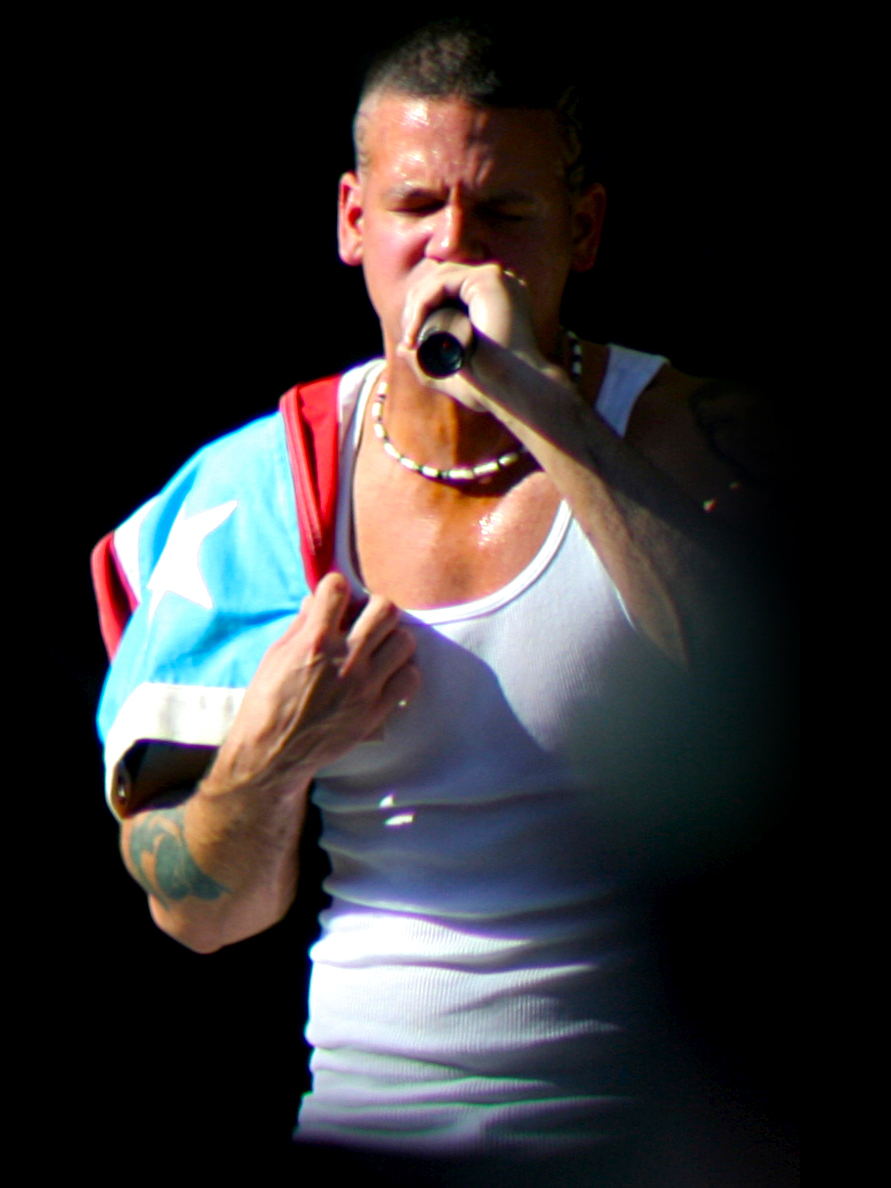
Residente performing in New York in 2006.

Calle 13 was formed when Residente and his stepbrother Visitante (real name Eduardo José Cabra Martínez) began creating music together in 2004. Before forming the group, Residente obtained a master's degree in art from the Savannah College of Art and Design while Visitante had studied music at the University of Puerto Rico. Residente returned to Puerto Rico in 2003. The step-brothers hosted their music on a website, and began searching for a record label to release their music commercially.

After sending demo tapes to White Lion Records, the duo was offered a record deal. Residente chose White Lion due to his admiration for Tego Calderón, another artist on the label. White Lion president Elías de León explained that his cousin and A&R director alerted him to the demo and stated, "These weird guys brought this demo. You've got to listen to it." Residente was working at his day job as a draftsman for an architectural firm when he received the call that Calle 13 had been signed. The group then recorded "Se Vale Tó-Tó" and released it as a single to the Puerto Rican radio station WVOZ (Mix 107), where it became a radio hit on the island. To promote the group locally, Residente directed and edited the video for "Se Vale Tó-Tó" with the help of his cousin, which was filmed on a relatively small budget of US$14,000.

The duo gained recognition for their controversial song "Querido FBI", which responded to the killing of Filiberto Ojeda Ríos, a key figure of the Puerto Rican independence movement. Shortly after, the duo collaborated with Julio Voltio on the single "Chulin Culin Chunfly", which reached number eight on the Billboard Hot Latin Songs chart, creating more buzz for the group. After the success of "Querido F.B.I." and "Chulin Culin Chunfly", the duo headed to the studio to record its debut album. When creating music for the record, Residente explained, "I didn't care about anything. I had no commitments, I was relaxed." According to Residente, the lack of critical recognition and fame allowed the rapper to express himself freely on the record. When composing songs for the album, Residente began by writing lyrics and Visitante then constructed his beats to complement the lyrical content.

In December of the same year, Residente was invited by the Governor of Puerto Rico to join the campaign against Balas al Aire (Bullets in the Air). Residente and his brother, Eduardo Cabra (nicknamed "Visitante") composed "Ley de Gravedad" ("The Law of Gravity"). At the same time, The New York Times invited Americans to visit Puerto Rico to have the opportunity to meet "the first intellectual who reached stardom with Reggaeton". His first two songs, along with the song "Suave", made him well known in Latin America.

=== 2007–2008: Residente o Visitante and Los de Atrás Vienen Conmigo ===
"Tango del Pecado"
The first single from Residente o Visitante (2007), "Tango del Pecado", lyrically focuses on Residente's controversial relationship with former Miss Universe Denise Quiñones.

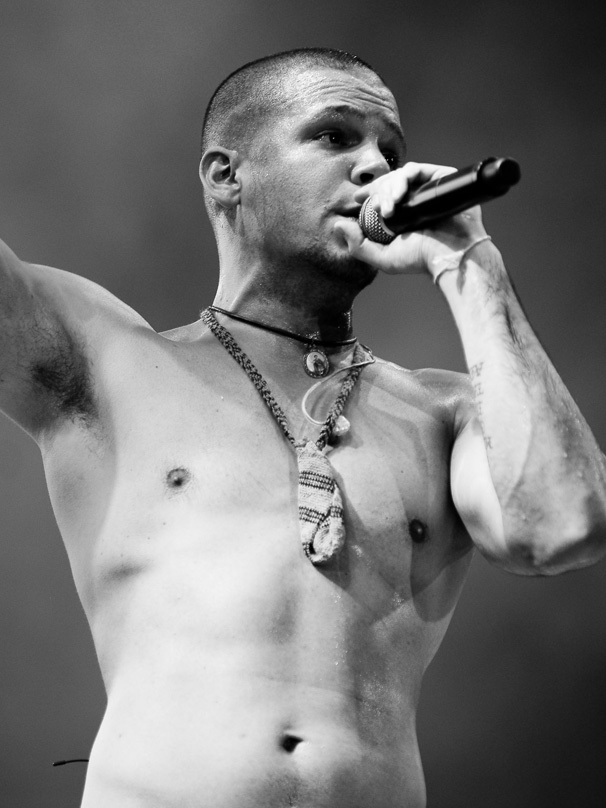
Residente performing on August 29, 2009 at the Festival Afrocaribeño.

While writing the follow-up to Calle 13, the duo took a trip to South America to explore areas populated by Latin America's indigenous and African-descended minorities. Residente reflected on the journey, stating, "We saw horrible things, but also things that were incredibly beautiful. Some of the contrasts are really intense."

Residente described the group's second album, Residente o Visitante album as more introspective and autobiographical than its predecessor. He explained that the group did not feel any pressure to compete with the success of Calle 13, and felt that the recording of Residente o Visitante was a smoother process than the first: "The main difference for us this time around was that we had more opportunities, more tools and more money. We were also on tour at the same time, unlike the first. I spent my time writing during the travels, while my brother would write the music." The album's lead single, "Tango del Pecado", was addressed to the parents of Residente's then-girlfriend, former Miss Universe Denise Quiñones, who did not approve of the couple's relationship. "Tango del Pecado" also created controversy due to the repeated chanting of "Súbele el volumen a la música satánica" (turn up the satanic music). Residente asserted that he did not add the line to create a reaction, saying, "I never do something expecting something. I do things because I like them." Residente o Visitante debuted on the U.S. Billboard Top Latin Albums chart at number one, displacing Jennifer Lopez's Spanish album Como Ama una Mujer, and on the Billboard 200 at number 52, selling about 12,000 copies in its first week.

The group followed with Los de Atrás Vienen Conmigo on October 21, 2008. Regarding Residente's performance on the album, Jon Pareles of The New York Times referred to the rapper as "a visionary", and opined that "Few hip-hop or urban acts, in any language, match so much ambition to so much fun." The album experimented with genres such as samba, candombe, and electronica. The album won five Latin Grammys at the Latin Grammy Awards of 2009 including "Album of the Year". The group generated controversy when Residente was hosting the 2009 MTV Latin America Awards and attempted to inform the audience about a strike in Puerto Rico in protest of governor Luis Fortuño's cutting of thousands of government jobs, one of which belonged to Residente's mother. During the ceremony, he referred to Fortuño as a "son of a whore", which generated widespread anger towards the group. Reflecting on the incident "I was upset, really upset. But I'm a little more strategic now – I want to speak the truth, but I don't want to diminish the merits of what I'm saying."

=== 2009–2015: Entren Los Que Quieran and Multi Viral ===
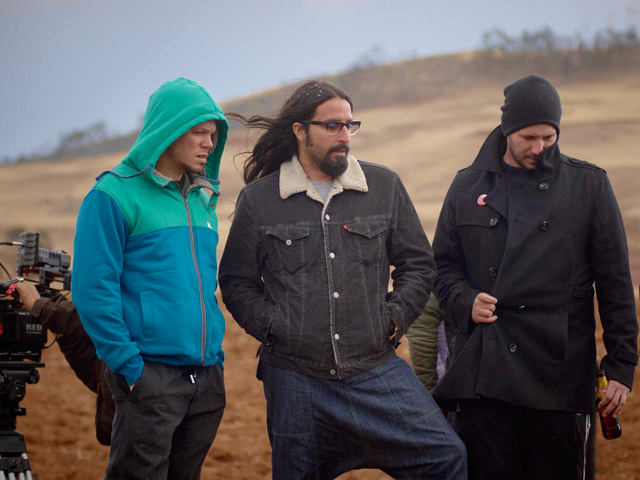
Residente (left) in Cuzco, Peru in 2011 on the set of the music video for "Latinoamérica".

On May 2, 2009, Calle 13 performed once again at the Coliseo de Puerto Rico José Miguel Agrelot for the release of their third album Los de Atrás Vienen Conmigo. In the Heights playwright Lin-Manuel Miranda was invited to make an appearance after Residente had seen his acceptance speech for Best Original Score at the 62nd Tony Awards. Backstage, Flor Joglar de Gracia, mother of Residente and little sister ILE, revealed to Miranda their familial connection to Gilberto Concepción de Gracia, founder of the Puerto Rican Independence Party. Miranda and Residente have since confirmed their family relation through social media.

Residente once again became the subject of debate when the duo traveled to Cuba in March 2010, to perform in front of the American embassy in the country. Before the show, a political prisoner had died in a hunger strike in protest of the Cuban government, and Cuban exiles in Miami criticized the group for performing at such a time. Residente defended the performance, noting that it had been inaccurately reported and that "we said things that no artist had said from the stage, like 'here the people are in charge, and the government has to obey.'" These events had a major impact on Residente's lyrical style and the subjects he planned to discuss on the new album: "What's making me more mature is not about my age, it's about what I'm seeing and living. I'm not saying things carelessly anymore. I'm thinking before I say them."

With the lyrics on Entren Los Que Quieran, Residente took a more political approach, inspired by events that transpired after the last album. "Calma Pueblo" discusses various topics including dishonest politicians, lip-synching in live performances, and payola. Residente also references Calle 13's sponsors with the line "Adidas doesn't use me, I use Adidas." Residente has described the lyrics of Multi Viral as "more existential" and went on to say: "Suddenly, I've started to be more aware, or worried, about living and dying. I thought, maybe I can do something bigger than politics".

=== 2016–present: Solo career ===
Hoping to understand his genetic background, Residente took a DNA test that revealed his roots trace back to 10 different locations around the World, including Armenia, Ghana, China and his homeland Puerto Rico. Such diversity inspired him to produce what would later result in a solo album, a documentary and a book released via Fusion Media Group (Univision Communications) under the same common title Residente. In April 2015, Residente announced that he was in Siberia working on his debut solo album. Residente released his debut solo album titled Residente in 2017. The album received acclaim from the Latin music academy and mainstream critics winning the Latin Grammy for best urban music album and being named Billboard's Best Spanish Language Album of the Year.

During an interview with Billboard, Residente criticized modern Spanish language urban music citing it as uninspired, simple, ignorant and redundant. This prompted hip-hop and reggaeton artist Tempo to respond lyrically which led to a highly publicized rap battle. Mainstream Hispanic journalists declared Residente victorious as well as many mainstream audiences and outlets on social media. His song "La Cátedra" is a 12-minute, 1,900 word record diss track, beating the previous Guinness Book of World record-holders, Eminem and MC Harry Shotta.

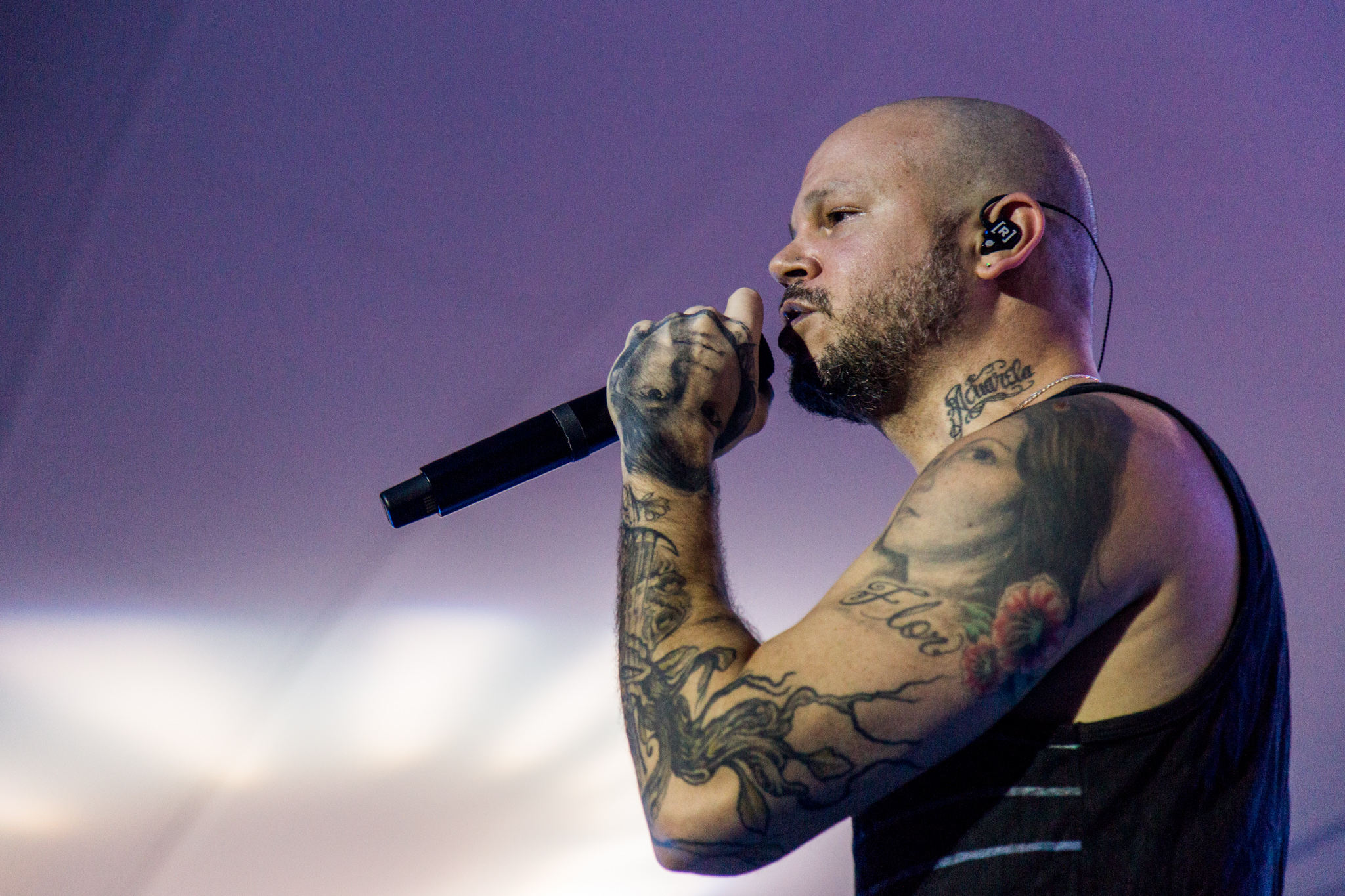
Residente performing at the MUPA Festival in Panama in 2019

On March 11, 2017, the artist's self-titled documentary, Residente, was released. After receiving the results of his DNA test, the documentary follows Residente on a global journey tracing back his ancestors through different continents and countries. Residente travels to various countries and regions including Siberia, Georgia, Moscow, China, Burkina Faso, Ghana and his home country, Puerto Rico. As he travels through different regions, he collaborates with different local musicians playing indigenous instruments, creating his debut self-titled album, Residente.

In April 2018, Residente released the single "Sexo" in collaboration with American producer Dillon Francis. In the song, Residente theorizes that the main motivation behind all human activity is sex. Residente directed the accompanying music video, which was filmed in Colombia. The upbeat song and colorful video were considered to be a stylistic departure from the more serious, introspective work showcased on his solo album, with Billboard explaining that the song "talks about sex in a joyful, all inclusive (the lyrics are intentionally gender-neutral), G-rated manner." In July 2019, Residente released the single "Bellacoso" featuring Puerto Rican artist Bad Bunny. Musically, the song was inspired by Daddy Yankee and the lyrical content was inspired by feminist resistance, with the song advocating for consent and denouncing sexual harassment. The music video, filmed in Puerto Rico, was directed by French cinematographer Gregory Ohrel.

Residente released a collaboration with Bad Bunny titled "Afilando los cuchillos" ("Sharpening the Knives"), a political polemic against Puerto Rican governor Ricardo Rosselló. He took part in mass protests against this governor, alongside Bad Bunny and Ricky Martin. In February 2020, Residente released the single "René". The introspective song discusses depression and the killing of a close friend of the rapper by police. The seven-minute music video, directed by Residente, features the artist standing on a baseball field, reflecting on his childhood and career. He described creating the song and video as therapeutic, explaining "It makes me feel like maybe people will know me a little bit more, and knowing that makes me feel better." In May 2020, he released the song and accompanying music video for "Antes Que El Mundo Se Acabe", which features couples from all around the world kissing, including celebrities such as Bad Bunny and girlfriend Gabriela, Lionel Messi and his wife Antonela, and Ricky Martin and his husband Jwan Yosef.

=== Film ===
On October 15, 2020, it was announced that Residente and Sony Music Entertainment signed a multi-year deal. The partnership, named 1868 Studios, aimed to focus on diverse narratives, including stories featuring Latin American culture.

On February 8, 2023, it was announced that Alexander Dinelaris Jr. is working with Residente to co-write a film titled Porto Rico. On February 18, 2026, it was announced that Bad Bunny will star in the film alongside Edward Norton, and Viggo Mortensen, with Alejandro González Iñárritu serving as executive producer.

In 2024, Residente played the lead role of Vicente in the American film In the Summers directed by Alessandra Lacorazza Samudio.

== Luis Fortuño comments ==
On October 15, 2009, Calle 13 won the Premios MTV Latinoamérica for "Best Urban Artist". Pérez hosted the ceremony, and used this exposure to insult Puerto Rican governor Luis Fortuño and comment about a civilian general strike that was organized earlier that day, held to protest the firing of more than 25,000 public employees by Fortuño's administration. Pérez generated much controversy after referring to Fortuño as an "hijo de la gran puta". The phrase is commonly translated as "son of a bitch", although the phrase places emphasis on the mother of the subject being a prostitute, which many found disrespectful to Fortuño's mother. Fortuño responded by saying "This individual disrespected all Puerto Rican women, all Puerto Rican mothers and the people of Puerto Rico in general."

== Philanthropy, education and recognition ==
=== Humanitarian efforts ===
- In February 2011, the group had three shows in Luna Park of Buenos Aires, Argentina. It was requested at the entrance that the fans donate powder milk or school materials for people in need. On May 10, 2011, Calle 13 appeared on the well-known Jimmy Kimmel show in the United States. René took advantage of the opportunity to share a political message, as he usually does. He wore a T-shirt that read, "Pa'l carajo la cuota" ("To hell with the quota"), alluding to the controversial quota of $800 that was imposed on the students of the University of Puerto Rico.
- After taking the T-shirt off, he revealed two messages written on his body. On the front, there was a message that read, "No al gasoducto" ("No to the pipeline"), in reference to the Via Verde project pushed by Luis Fortuño, Governor of Puerto Rico (a pro-annexationist), for the use of natural gas that he wanted to build in the northern mountains of the Island for which he had already expropriated several rural homes and that would cause a great deforestation with the potential of causing a catastrophe of great proportions. On his back, the message read "Patagonia sin represas" ("Patagonia without dams"), protesting the Chilean megaproject, Hydroaysén.
- In November 2011, Calle 13 joined UNICEF in its campaign against the trade and exploitation of children. As part of this project, they filmed a documentary in collaboration with MTV Exit named, Esclavos invisibles (Invisible Slaves), and donated the track, "Preparame la cena" ("Prepare Me Dinner"), from the album Entren los que quieran.
- In November 2011, Residente and his band Calle 13 performed in a concert in El Salvador, where the money to buy the tickets was collected in rice and beans, which were later given to the people affected by the major storms that hit the country during two weeks.
- On May 25, 2012, they exchanged tickets for food again (beans and rice). This time, it was in Hermosillo, Mexico, where they were able to collect almost 50,000 pounds (20,000 kilos) of food for the poorest community of the region.
- On May 26, 2012, they participated in the Wirikuta Fest in Mexico City in support of Frente en defensa de Wirikuta (the Front in defense of Wirikuta). Wirikuta is a sacred desert that extends through more than 345,000 acres (140,000 hectares) in the City of San Juan de Potosi. It is being exploited by Canadian Mining companies, which are putting in danger endemic species and the health of the families that live there.
- On February 26, 2014, René Pérez visited La Fortaleza, the residence of the Governor of Puerto Rico, for an informal meeting with the Governor Alejandro Padilla. On this occasion, he brought two young people with him: Gerald Constanzo, from the community Martín Peña, and Jaylivan Díaz, from the Barriada Morales de Caguas, to discuss with the Governor their neighborhood's needs.

=== Commitment to education ===
Residente has been a strong fighter in favor of Latin American education, joining protest marches in Puerto Rico, Chile, Colombia and the Dominican Republic, among others.

- In April 2010, René showed a video at the University of Puerto Rico recorded by different local and international artists and athletes with messages of support to the student struggles in the country. The same day, he fed the students that were protesting at the university and that had the campus closed down.
- In September 2011, he joined forces with Chilean student leaders to support them in their fight calling for a quality, free public university.

In November 2011, during the Latin Grammy Awards, René wore a T-shirt that read "Educación Pública, gratuita para Puerto Rico, Chile, Colombia y República Dominicana" ("Free, public education for Puerto Rico, Chile, Colombia, and the Dominican Republic").

== Personal life ==
Residente married Soledad Fandiño in January 2013 in a private ceremony in Puerto Rico. Their son Milo was born on August 7, 2014 and the couple divorced in 2017. After lyrics in his 2017 song "Mis Disculpas" were criticized as offensive towards people with Down syndrome and autism, Residente disclosed his own diagnoses of autism and attention deficit hyperactivity disorder. He has self-identified as anarchist in his single Mis disculpas, having also previously touched on the topic in another song, Vamos a Portarnos Mal.

== Discography ==
=== With Calle 13 ===
- Calle 13 (2005)
- Residente o Visitante (2007)
- Los de Atrás Vienen Conmigo (2008)
- Entren Los Que Quieran (2010)
- Multi Viral (2014)

=== Solo ===
- Residente (2017)
- Las Letras Ya No Importan (2024)

== Filmography ==
=== Film ===
Title	Year	Role	Notes	Ref.
Calle 13: Sin Mapa	2009	Himself	Documentary, also screenwriter and music	
Mercedes Sosa, Cantora: Un Viaje Íntimo	2009	Himself	Documentary	
Old Dogs	2009	Tattoo artist		
Sonó Sonó Tité Curet	2011	Himself	Documentary	
Hecho en México	2012	Himself	Documentary	
Residente	2017	Himself	Documentary, also director and music	
Rubén Blades Is Not My Name	2018	Himself	Documentary, post-production	
In the Summers	2024	Vicente		
Porto Rico	TBA	—N/a	Director, filming	

=== Television ===
Title	Year	Role	Notes	Ref.
My Block: Puerto Rico	2006	Himself	Documentary	
8th Premios MTV Latinoamérica	2009	Himself (co-host)	TV special	

=== Other ===
Title	Year	Role	Notes	Ref.
Líbano	2017	Himself	Short documentary, also director	

=== Directed music videos ===
Title	Year	Performer(s)	Notes	Ref.
"Somos Anormales"	2017	Residente		
"Desencuentro"	2017	Residente featuring SoKo	Nominated – Latin Grammy Award for Best Short Form Music Video	
"Guerra"	2017	Residente		
"Sexo"	2018	Residente and Dillon Francis featuring iLe		

==== Other credits ====
Title	Year	Performer(s)	Credit	Director	Ref.
"Así de Grandes Son las Ideas"	2014	Calle 13	Story	José Rivera	

== Band members ==
- Daniel Díaz – percussion, backing vocals
- Leo Genovese – keyboards
- Brahim Fribgane – percussion, strings
- Kiani Medina – backing vocals
- Elias Meister – guitar
- Justin Purtill – guitar
- El Estepario Siberiano – drums

== Accolades ==
- 4 Grammy Awards
- 27 Latin Grammy Awards (including two Album of the Year, two Record of the Year, and one Song of the Year awards) – holds the record for the most Latin Grammy Award wins

Other recognitions

- Ramón Emeterio Betances Medal; given by the Ateneo Puertorriqueño in 2011 in San Juan, Puerto Rico for "having fought for the permanence of the Puerto Rican identity and the freedom of the island."
- Rodolfo Walsh Award; given by the School of Journalism and Social Communication at the National University of La Plata in 2012 in Buenos Aires Province, Argentina for Calle 13's "contribution to communication and popular culture."
- Emissary of Awareness; given by Amnesty International in 2012 in London, England for "his social commitment and identification with young people in Latin America."
- Nobel Peace Summit Award; given by the Nobel Peace Laureates in 2015 during the World Summit of Nobel Peace Laureates in Barcelona, Spain for "his song lyrics and his support for social causes."
- BMI Champion Award; given by Broadcast Music, Inc. in 2018 during the 25th BMI Latin Music Awards in California, United States for "his musical career and philanthropic efforts."
