= Calle 13 discography =

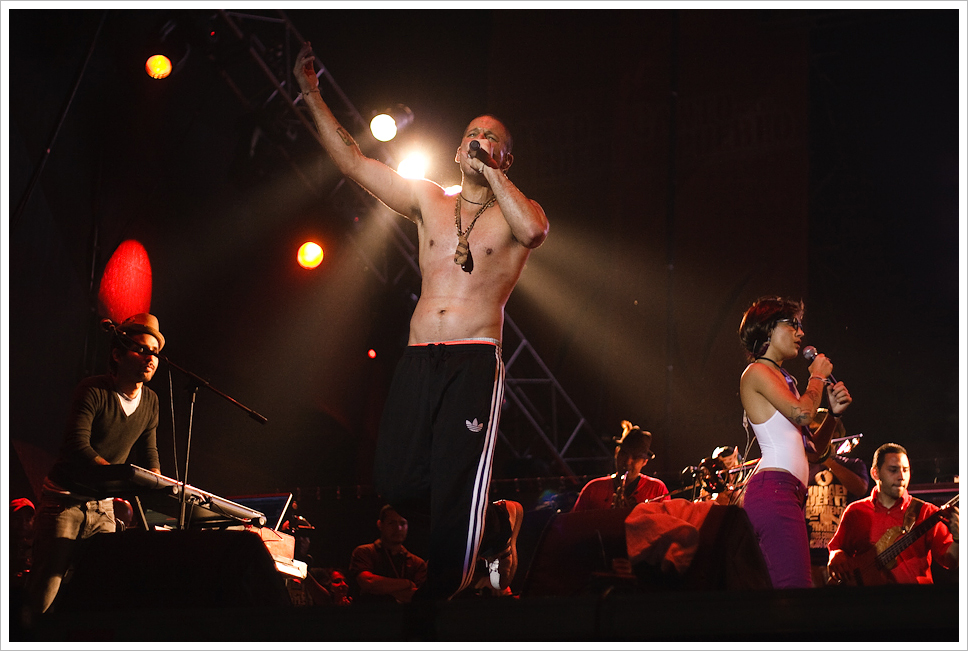
- Calle 13 on a concert.
- Studio albums: 5
- Singles: 20
- Music videos: 21

This is a comprehensive listing of official releases by Calle 13, a Puerto Rican urban music duo.

== Albums ==
Year	Title	Chart positions							Certifications	Sales
Year	Title	US	US Latin	US Latin Rhythm	US Rap	ARG	MEX	SPA	Certifications	Sales
2005	Calle 13: Released: November 29, 2005; Label: White Lion; Formats: CD, digital download	189	6	1	—	—	—	—	RIAA: Platinum (Latin)	US: 150,000; World: 350,000
2007	Residente o Visitante: Released: April 24, 2007; Label: Sony BMG; Formats: CD, digital download	52	1	1	13	—	—	—	CAPIF: Gold	
2008	Los de Atrás Vienen Conmigo: Released: October 21, 2008; Label: Sony Music Latin; Formats: CD, digital download	89	3	1	19	—	—	—		US: 54,000
2010	Entren Los Que Quieran: Released: November 22, 2010; Label: Sony Music Latin; Formats: CD, digital download	—	6	2	25	1	22	90		US: 27,400
2014	Multi_Viral: Released: March 1, 2014; Label: El Abismo; Formats: CD, digital download	—	4	—	23	—	—	40	AMPROFON: Platinum	World: 100,000

== Singles ==
Title	Year	Peak chart positions				Album
Title	Year	US Latin	US Trop.	MEX	SPA	Album
"Se Vale To-To"	2005	—	19	—	—	Calle 13
"Atrévete-te-te"	2006	15	6	—	—	Calle 13
"Suave"	2006	32	40	—	—	Calle 13
"La Jirafa"	2006	—	—	—	—	Calle 13
"Tango del Pecado" (featuring Bajofondo and Panasuyo)	2007	—	—	—	—	Residente o Visitante
"La Cumbia de Los Aburridos"	2007	31	17	—	—	Residente o Visitante
"Pa'l Norte" (featuring Orishas)	2007	27	10	—	—	Residente o Visitante
"No Hay Nadie Como Tú" (featuring Café Tacuba)	2008	23	21	5	36	Los de Atrás Vienen Conmigo
"Electro Movimiento" (featuring Cuci Amador)	2009	— (Note: "Electro Movimiento" did not enter the Billboard Hot Latin Songs chart but peaked on the Latin Rhythm Airplay chart at number 11.)	—	17	—	Los de Atrás Vienen Conmigo
"La Perla" (featuring La Chilinga and Rubén Blades)	2009	—	—	—	—	Los de Atrás Vienen Conmigo
"Fiesta de Locos"	2009	—	—	—	—	Los de Atrás Vienen Conmigo
"Calma Pueblo" (featuring Omar Rodríguez)	2010	—	—	—	—	Entren Los Que Quieran
"Vamo' A Portarnos Mal"	2010	— (Note: "Vamo' A Portarnos Mal" did not enter the Billboard Hot Latin Songs chart but peaked on the Latin Rhythm Airplay chart at number 11.)	21	—	—	Entren Los Que Quieran
"Baile de los Pobres"	2011	—	—	14	—	Entren Los Que Quieran
"Muerte en Hawaii"	2011	— (Note: "Muerte en Hawaii" did not enter the Billboard Hot Latin Songs chart but peaked on the Latin Rhythm Airplay chart at number 11.)	—	48	—	Entren Los Que Quieran
"Latinoamérica"	2011	— (Note: "Latinoamérica" did not enter the Billboard Hot Latin Songs chart but peaked on the Latin Digital Songs chart at number 9.)	—	—	—	Entren Los Que Quieran
"La Vuelta al Mundo"	2012	— (Note: "La Vuelta al Mundo" did not enter the Billboard Hot Latin Songs chart but peaked on the Latin Rhythm Airplay chart at number 14.)	—	44	—	Entren Los Que Quieran
"Multi_Viral" (featuring Julian Assange, Kamilya Jubran, and Tom Morello)	2013	— (Note: "Multi_Viral" did not enter the Billboard Hot Latin Songs chart but peaked on the Latin Digital Songs chart at number 39.)	—	—	—	Multi_Viral
"El Aguante"	2014	— (Note: "El Aguante" did not enter the Billboard Hot Latin Songs chart but peaked on the Latin Rhythm Airplay chart at number 14.)	—	—	—	Multi_Viral
"Ojos Color Sol" (featuring Silvio Rodríguez)	2014	— (Note: "Ojos Color Sol" did not enter the Billboard Hot Latin Songs chart but peaked on the Latin Rhythm Airplay chart at number 12.)	—	—	—	Multi_Viral
"—" denotes a recording that did not chart or was not released in that territory.						Multi_Viral

=== Featured singles ===
Year	Song	Peak chart positions			Album
Year	Song	U.S. Latin Tracks	U.S. Latin Rhythm	U.S. Tropical Airplay	Album
2006	"Chulin Culin Chunfly" (Featuring Julio Voltio)	8	5	13	Voltio
2006	"No Hay Igual" (Featuring Nelly Furtado)	—	—	—	Loose (International Tour edition)

== Music videos ==
Title	Year	Director(s)	Ref.
"Se Vale To-To"	2006	—	
"Atrévete-te-te"	2006	Gabriel Coss	
"La Jirafa"	2006	—	
"Suave"	2006	—	
"Un Beso de Desayuno"	2007	Joaquín Cambre	
"Pa'l Norte" (featuring Orishas)	2007	Joaquín Cambre	
"Tango del Pecado" (featuring Bajofondo and Panasuyo)	2007	—	
"Cumbia de los Aburridos"	2007	—	
"No Hay Nadie Como Tú" (featuring Café Tacvba)	2008	—	
"La Perla" (featuring La Chilinga and Rubén Blades)	2009	Gabriel Coss	
"Vamo' A Portarnos Mal"	2010	Gabriel Coss	
"Muerte en Hawaii"	2011	Alejandro Santiago Ciena	
"Latinoamérica"	2011	Jorge Carmona; Milovan Radovic	
"La Vuelta al Mundo"	2012	Juan José Campanella; Camilo Antolini	
"La Bala"	2012	Simón Brand	
"Multi_Viral" (featuring Julian Assange, Kamilya Jubran, and Tom Morello)	2013	Kacho López Mari	
"Adentro"	2014	Kacho López Mari	
"El Aguante"	2014	Kacho López Mari	
"Ojos Color Sol" (featuring Silvio Rodríguez)	2014	Kacho López Mari	
"Así de Grandes son las Ideas"	2014	José Rivera	
"Respira el Momento"	2015	Kacho López Mari	

== See also ==
- Residente discography
