= Kacho López Mari =

Puerto Rican filmmaker

Kacho López Mari (born May 16, 1975) is a Puerto Rican filmmaker and music video director, co-founder of the production company Filmes Zapatero. His work spans more than forty music videos and short films, including projects that helped define reggaetón’s visual language and others that merge documentary and activism. In 2014, he became the first director to win both Best Short Form Music Video and Best Long Form Music Video at the same Latin Grammy Awards ceremony. He is a 7-time nominee and two time Latin Grammy Award winner for his music videos “Ojos Color Sol” (Calle 13) (featuring actors Gael García Bernal and María Valverde) and “Loco de Amor” (Juanes). His second collaboration with Juanes titled Mis Planes son Amarte (coincidentally Latin music's first visual album), got López Mari his 6th Latin Grammy nomination and his 4th for Best Music Video, Long Form. His music video/documentary "El Apagón - Aquí vive gente" for Bad Bunny was nominated at The Shots Awards of the Americas 2023 in the video of the year category and was shortlisted at Cannes Lions 70 in Cannes, France in 2023. The video was also nominated at the VMAs 2023 in the Video for good category. In August 2023 Premios Rolling Stone en Español nominated "Canción Desaparecida" by Juanes, music video López Mari directed, in the Videoclip del Año category. In 2025 Kacho directed the music video for Baile Inolvidable (Bad Bunny), the first Salsa song to reach #1 in Apple Music's global charts.

== Career ==
Kacho López Mari started his career in the field of graphic design. Before directing, López Mari produced underground music events in Puerto Rico and worked on television commercials at Paradiso Films. His first music video was Tego Calderón’s “Abayarde/Gracias” (2003), a six-minute narrative piece combining two songs. The video coincided with Calderón’s breakthrough and became one of the genre’s earliest visual landmarks. Throughout his career, López Mari has directed music videos for Bad Bunny, Ricky Martin, Juanes, Ile, Aventura, Daddy Yankee, Calle 13, Don Omar, Tego Calderón and Chayanne among many others.

== Style and themes ==
López Mari’s videography ranges from genre-defining reggaetón hits to socially engaged works that integrate documentary and political commentary. His films often emphasize cultural identity, memory, and the relationship between image and community.

== Cultural impact ==
A 2025 feature by the Los Angeles Times highlighted López Mari as one of the key visual storytellers behind Latin music’s rise to global prominence. The newspaper described his portfolio of more than forty music videos as “flip-booking through modern Latin music history” and credited his early collaborations—such as Abayarde, Gasolina and Ojos Color Sol—with helping to define the aesthetics of reggaetón and contemporary Latin pop. The Los Angeles Times further noted that López Mari’s later works, including El Apagón — Aquí Vive Gente and Multi_Viral, expand the possibilities of the music video format by fusing performance with documentary storytelling and social commentary. His inclusion in the paper’s De Los section was cited as emblematic of a growing recognition of Latinx creatives shaping global culture from behind the camera.

== Notable works ==
- Daddy Yankee – "Gasolina" (2005): Co-directed; although assembled quickly by looping initial footage for MTV broadcast, it introduced reggaetón to global audiences and helped establish the genre’s early on-screen aesthetic.
- Calle 13 – "Adentro" (2014): Latin Grammy nominee for Best Short Form Video; features frontman Residente destroying a Maserati as an anti-consumerism statement.
- Calle 13 – "Multi_Viral" (2014): Filmed in the West Bank; portrays children building a guitar from a rifle and was described by López Mari as one of his most important projects.
- Calle 13 – "Ojos Color Sol" (2014): Latin Grammy winner for Best Short Form Video; features Silvio Rodríguez, with Gael García Bernal and María Valverde in the cast.
- Juanes – "Loco de Amor (La Historia)" (2014): Latin Grammy winner for Best Long Form Music Video, the same year López Mari also won Best Short Form, a first-ever double win in the awards’ history.
- Juanes – Mis Planes Son Amarte (2017): Recognized as Latin music’s first major visual album, a one-hour narrative linking twelve songs through a sci-fi/romance storyline.
- Bad Bunny – "Callaíta" (2019): Crafted as a dream-like portrayal of Puerto Rican summer nights, Bad Bunny later praised it for conveying the feeling of a “hug.”
- Bad Bunny – "El Apagón — Aquí Vive Gente" (2022): Expanded into a 22-minute investigative short with journalist Bianca Graulau, spotlighting blackouts and post-hurricane infrastructure issues in Puerto Rico.
- Bad Bunny – "Baile Inolvidable" (2025): Filmed at the University of Puerto Rico and other island locations; part of the 2025 album cycle and continuing López Mari’s collaboration with Bad Bunny.

== Filmography ==
=== Music videos ===
Title	Year	Artist(s)	Notes	Ref.
Baile Inolvidable	2025	Bad Bunny	Nominated - VMAs 2025 Latin	
Canción Desaparecida	2023	Juanes and Mabiland	Nominated - Premio Rolling Stone 2023 Won - Buenos Aires Music Video Festival 2023 - Impacto Social Nominated - Brazil Music Video Festival - Melhor videoclipe Latam	
El Apagón-Aquí vive gente	2022	Bad Bunny	Short List - Video of the year - Shots Awards The Americas 2023 Short List - Cannes Lions 2023 - Entertainment for music Nominated - VMAs 2023 Video for good Won -Buenos Aires Music Video Festival 2023 - Documental	
Flow HP	2021	Don Omar and Residente	Won - Urban Video – Buenos Aires Music Video Festival 2021	
Volví	2021	Aventura and Bad Bunny		
Origen (Documental)	2021	Juanes	Nominated – Latin Grammy Award for Best Long Form Music Video	
Lo Nuestro Vale Más	2020	Jesse & Joy		
Tiburones	2020	Ricky Martin		
Tequila	2019	Juanes		
Tanto	2019	Jesse & Joy and Luis Fonsi		
Callaíta	2019	Bad Bunny		
Dandy del Congo	2018	Trending Tropics		
El Intelné	2018	Trending Tropics	Nominated – Best Concept at the Berlin Music Video Awards	
Di que sientes tú	2018	Chayanne		
La Player	2018	Zion & Lennox		
Yo Contra Ti	2017	Daddy Yankee featuring Orquesta Sinfónica de Puerto Rico	Won – Cannes Lions International Festival of Creativity Won – El Sol Award Won – Clio Awards Won – SME Digital Award	
Mis Planes Son Amarte	2017	Juanes	Nominated – Latin Grammy Award for Best Long Form Music Video	
Te Quiero Con Bugalú	2016	iLe		
La Vida (Respira el Momento)	2015	Calle 13		
Loco de Amor, La Historia	2014	Juanes	Won – Latin Grammy Award for Best Long Form Music Video	
Ojos Color Sol	2014	Calle 13 featuring Silvio Rodríguez	Won – Latin Grammy Award for Best Short Form Music Video	
Adentro	2014	Calle 13	Nominated – Latin Grammy Award for Best Short Form Music Video	
El Aguante	2014	Calle 13		
Multi_Viral	2014	Calle 13		
Musica en Tiempos	2014	Various Artists	Nominated – Latin Grammy Award for Best Long Form Music Video	
Hecho con Sabor a Puerto Rico	2013	Various Artists	Nominated – Latin Grammy Award for Best Long Form Music Video	
Se Van	2005	Julio Voltio		
Donqueo	2005	Don Omar		
Bandoleros	2005	Don Omar featuring Tego Calderón		
Gasolina	2004	Daddy Yankee	Won – Premios de la Gente "Video of the Year" Nominated – MTV2 Award "Best Video"	
Guajira	2004	Yerba Buena!		
Tal Vez	2003	Ricky Martin		
Jaleo	2003	Ricky Martin		
Abayarde	2003	Tego Calderón		

== Accolades ==
At the 16th Annual Latin Grammy Awards in 2014, López Mari won Best Short Form Music Video for Ojos Color Sol and Best Long Form Music Video for Loco de Amor (La Historia), becoming the first director to win both categories in the same year.

Year	Nominee/Work	Award	Result	Ref
2025	Baile Inolvidable	VMAs 2025 - Latin	Nominated	
2024	Director of the year	Heat Latin Music Awards 2024	Nominated	
2023	Canción Desaparecida	Brazil Music Video Festival - Melhor videoclipe Latam	Nominated	
2023	El Apagón	Buenos Aires Music Video Festival 2023 - Documental	Won	
2023	Canción Desaparecida	Buenos Aires Music Video Festival 2023- Impacto Social	Won	
2023	Canción Desaparecida	Premio Rolling Stone 2023 - Videoclip del Año	Nominated	
2023	El Apagón	VMAs 2023 - Video for Good	Nominated	
2023	El Apagón	Cannes Lions - Entertainment for music - Excellence in Music Video	Short List	
2023	El Apagón	SME Digital Awards	Best of Show	
2023	El Apagón	Shots Awards The Americas 2023 - Video of the year	Short List	
2022	Flow HP	Bogotá Music Video Festival	Finalist	
2021	Flow HP	Buenos Aires Music Video Festival 2021	Won	
2021	"Origen" Documental	Latin Grammy Award for Best Long Form Music Video	Nominated	
2018	"Yo Contra Ti"	Cannes Lions International Festival of Creativity award for Entertainment	Shortlist Winner	
2018	"Yo Contra Ti"	Cannes Lions International Festival of Creativity award for Radio and Audio	Won Bronze	
2018	"Yo Contra Ti"	El Festival Iberoamericano de la Comunicación Publicitaria El Sol award for Digital and Mobile	Won Silver	
2018	"Yo Contra Ti"	Clio Awards for Social Good and Music Marketing	Won Bronze	
2018	"Yo Contra Ti"	SME Digital Award for Best Social Responsibility Campaign	Won Gold	
2018	"Yo Contra Ti"	SME Digital Award for Best Use of Content Marketing	Won Gold	
2018	"Yo Contra Ti"	SME Digital Award for Best Video Execution	Won Silver	
2017	"Mis Planes Son Amarte"	Latin Grammy Award for Best Long Form Music Video	Nominated	
2015	"Loco de Amor, La Historia"	Latin Grammy Award for Best Long Form Music Video	Won	
2015	"Ojos Color Sol"	Latin Grammy Award for Best Short Form Music Video	Won	
2014	"Adentro"	Latin Grammy Award for Best Short Form Music Video	Nominated	
2014	"Música en Tiempos"	Latin Grammy Award for Best Long Form Music Video	Nominated	
2013	"Hecho con Sabor a Puerto Rico"	Latin Grammy Award for Best Long Form Music Video	Nominated	
2005	"Gasolina"	MTV2 Award "Best Video"	Nominated	
