= Biga Ranx =

French ragga hip hop musician

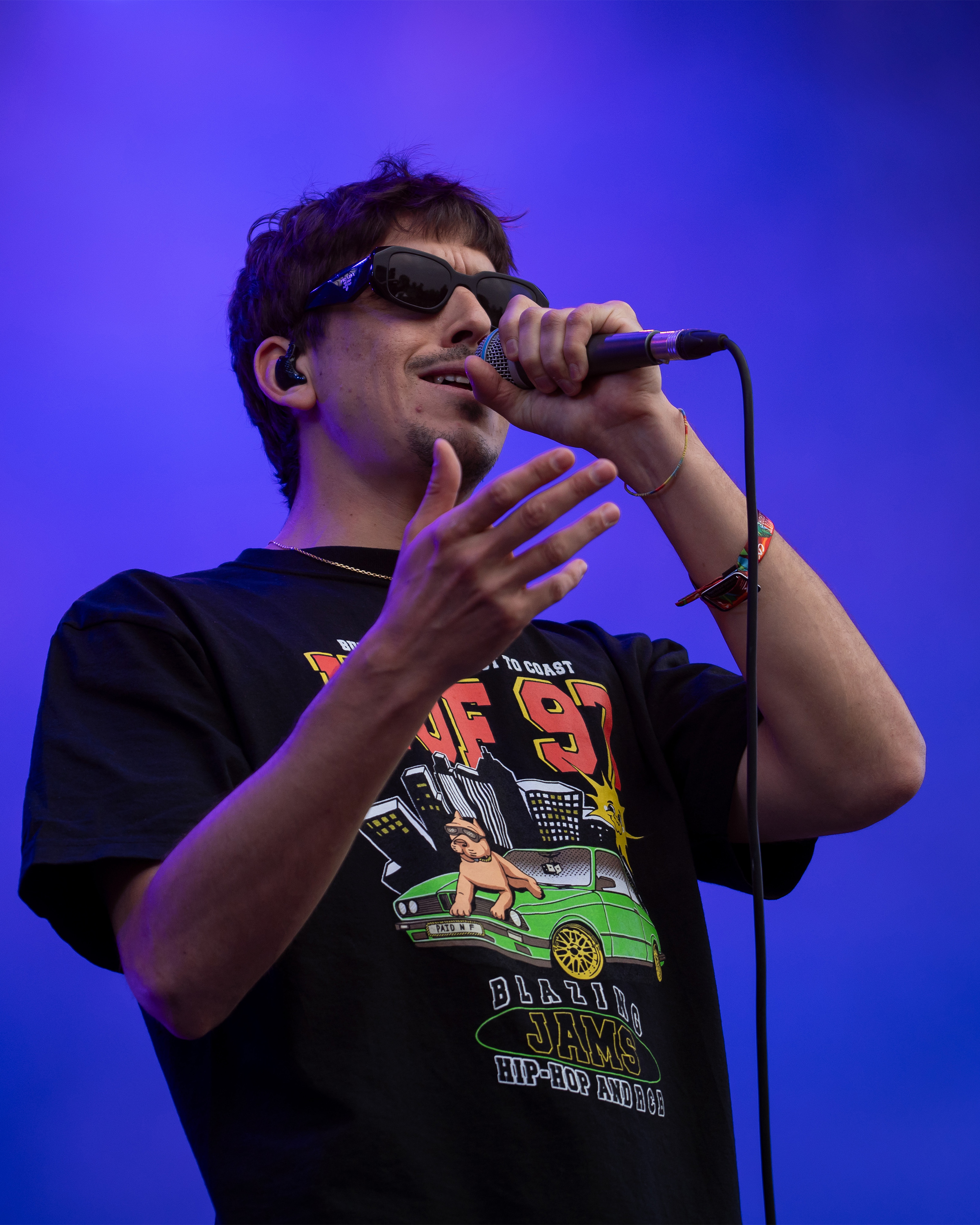

Background information
- Born: Gabriel Piotrowski; 27 September 1988 (age 37); Tours, Centre Region, France
- Genres: Reggae, Ragga, Dancehall, Hip Hop
- Label: X-Ray Production
- Website: http://bigaranxofficial.com/

Gabriel Piotrowski (born 27 September 1988), better known by his stage name Biga Ranx (sometimes stylized as Biga*Ranx), is a French ragga hip hop musician from Tours, Centre Region, signed to X-Ray Production, an independent record label based in Paris. He released his debut LP On Time in October 2011, and his second album Good Morning Midnight in April 2013.

He has collaborated with artists such as Maffi, Ondubground, Mungo's Hi Fi, and Joseph Cotton, notably featuring Cotton on his 2011 debut album On Time..

== Biography ==
Born in Tours, France, Biga took his musical inspiration from such Reggae artists as Super Cat, Alton Ellis and Vybz Kartel as well as from American rap music.

In 2004 he created the Bandalero Sound System alongside DJ Atili, occasionally featuring the Ondubground collective. He later collaborated with the Austrian DJ Governor General Rugged to create the Mus Bus Collective. In 2008 the Jamaican singjay Joseph Cotton renamed Biga by adding 'Ranx' to his name.

In 2011 Biga signed to the French label X-Ray Production and began creating On Time, which was released in October of that year. It was then elected the best Ragga/Dancehall album in France by the website Reggae.fr. In 2012 The World of Biga*Ranx, a project consisting of four 12-inch records was released, each a collaboration with a different producer: Maffi, Ondubground, Kanka and Mungo's Hi Fi. Biga released a remix of On Time in November 2012, with all the songs from his debut album remixed by artists such as Chinese Man, Aphrodite, A State of Mind and Tom Fire. Biga often works with Joseph Cotton, who did a guest appearance at his concert at La Cigale in May 2013 and appears on his album On Time.

In 2012 Biga went to Jamaica to film a documentary with France Ô, called Biga*Ranx en Jamaïque, which was broadcast in April 2013. The film followed his trip to Jamaica, where he met some of his Reggae idols such as Potential Kidd. Biga has performed at many European music festivals, including the Garance Reggae Festival, Reggae Sun Ska Festival and Solidays, and Europe's largest reggae festival SummerJam Biga went on national tours after the releases of both On Time and Good Morning Midnight, performing dates all over France with his live line-up, including at La Cigale in Paris.

In 2014, Biga Ranx featured the song Perseguido with Calle 13 in their new album Multi Viral.

== On television ==
Biga Ranx has appeared in the following French TV programmes:

- 66 Minutes on M6
- Biga*Ranx en Jamaique (Biga*Ranx in Jamaica) on France Ô: Follows Biga when he sets sail for Kingston, the Mecca of Reggae, to go forth and meet his idols.
- Le Petit Journal on Canal+, where he was interviewed by the star presenter Yann Barthès about his music and performed a live freestyle.

== Discography ==
Biga Ranx has released the following albums, all with X-Ray Production:

- On Time (October 2011)
- The World of Biga*Ranx & Maffi (September 2012)
- The World of Biga*Ranx & Ondubground (September 2012)
- The World of Biga*Ranx & Kanka (September 2012)
- On Time Remix (November 2012)
- Good Morning Midnight (April 2013)
- Live in Paris (January 2014)
- Nightbird (March 2015)
- 1988 (June 2017)
- Sunset Cassette (June 2020)
- St. Soleil (May 2021)
- Eh Yo! (June 2022)
