= Latin Grammy Award for Best Long Form Music Video =

Annual award

- Awarded for: video albums consisting of more than one song or track
- Country: United States
- Presented by: The Latin Recording Academy
- First award: 2006
- Currently held by: Ca7riel & Paco Amoroso for Papota (Short Film) (2025)
- Website: Latingrammy.com

The Latin Grammy Award for Best Long Form Music Video is an honor presented annually at the Latin Grammy Awards, a ceremony that recognizes excellence and promotes a wider awareness of cultural diversity and contributions of Latin recording artists in the United States and internationally. According to the category description guide for the 13th Latin Grammy Awards, the award is for video albums consisting of more than one song or track and is awarded to artists, video directors and/or producers of at least 51% of the total playing time. If the work is a tribute or collection of live performances, the award is presented only to the directors or producers.

The accolade for Best Long Form Music Video was first presented at the 7th Latin Grammy Awards in 2006 as a tie between Spanish recording artists Bebo and Cigala for their album Blanco y Negro En Vivo (2005) and Café Tacuba for their live album Un Viaje (2005). Three recipients of the award won with a MTV Unplugged release; Ricky Martin (2006), Julieta Venegas (2007) and Juanes (2012). Mexican singer Natalia Lafourcade holds the record of most wins in the category with three (2013, 2017, 2022).

== Recipients ==
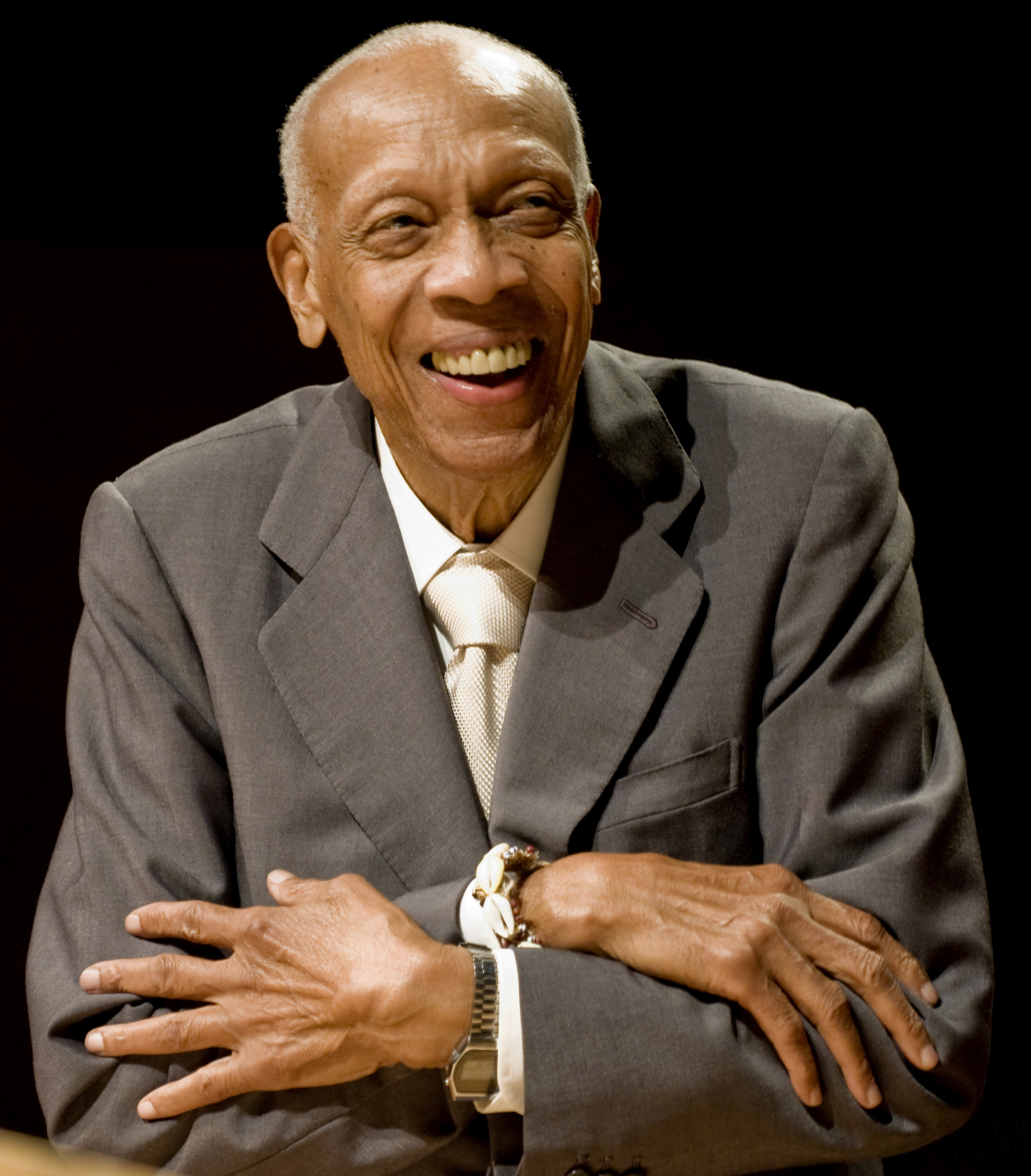
Cuban composer Bebo Valdés was one of the inaugural winners of the category in 2006.

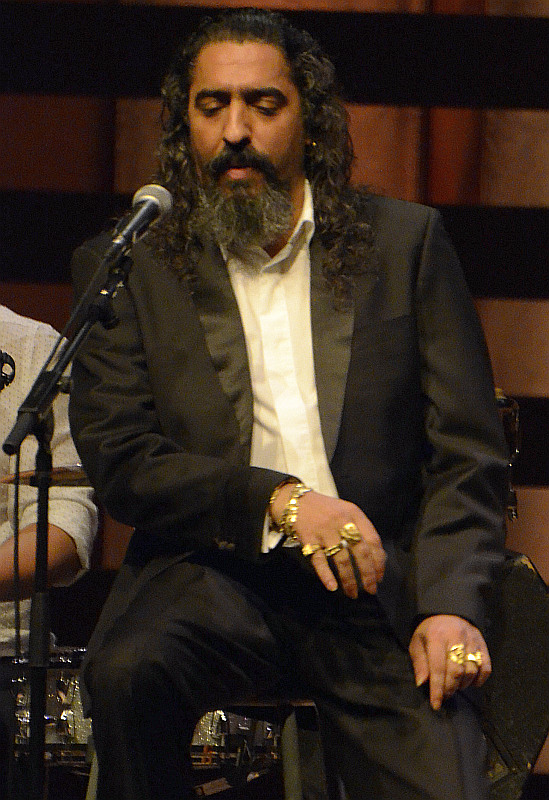
Romani Flamenco gypsy singer El Cigala was one of the inaugural winners of the category in 2006.

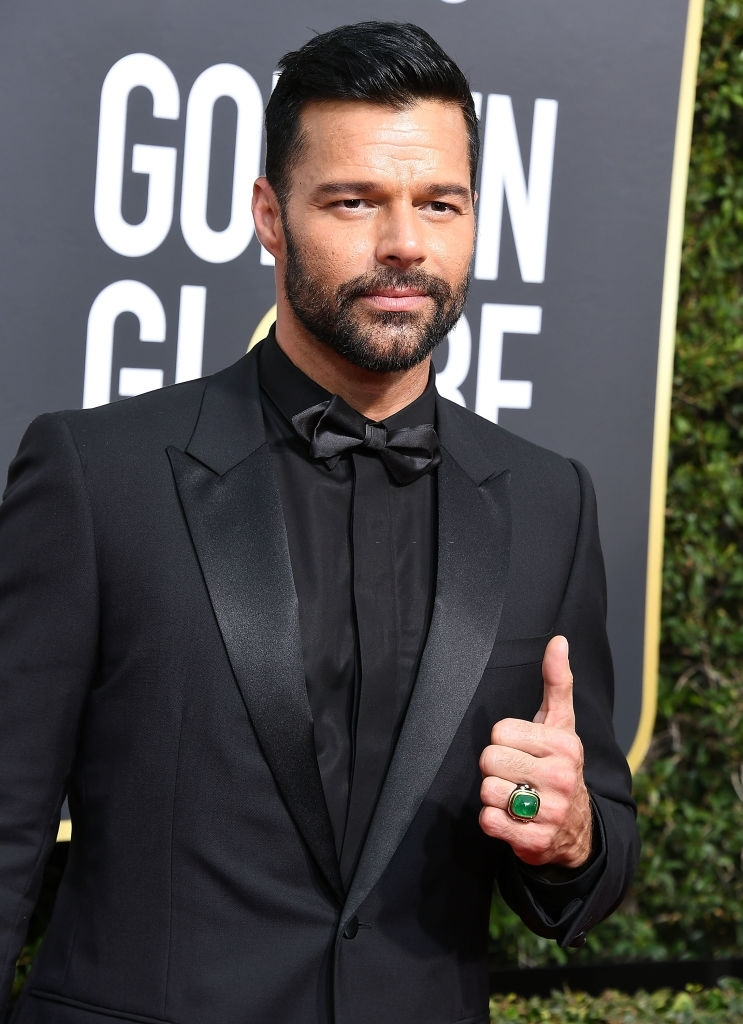
2007 winner Ricky Martin.

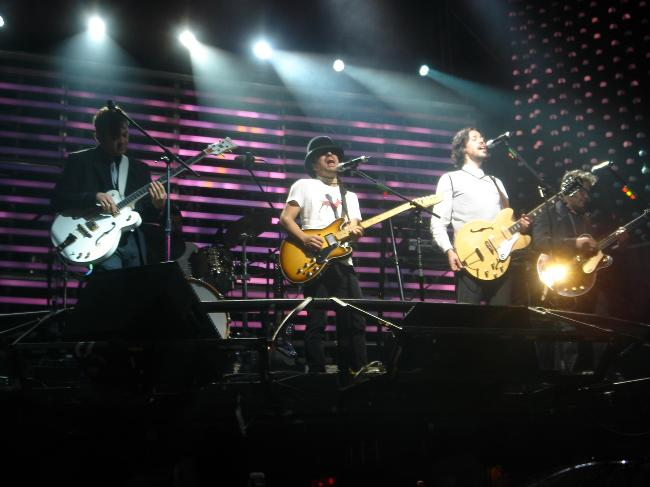
Mexican band Café Tacvba was one of the inaugural winners of the category in 2006. The band also won in 2014.

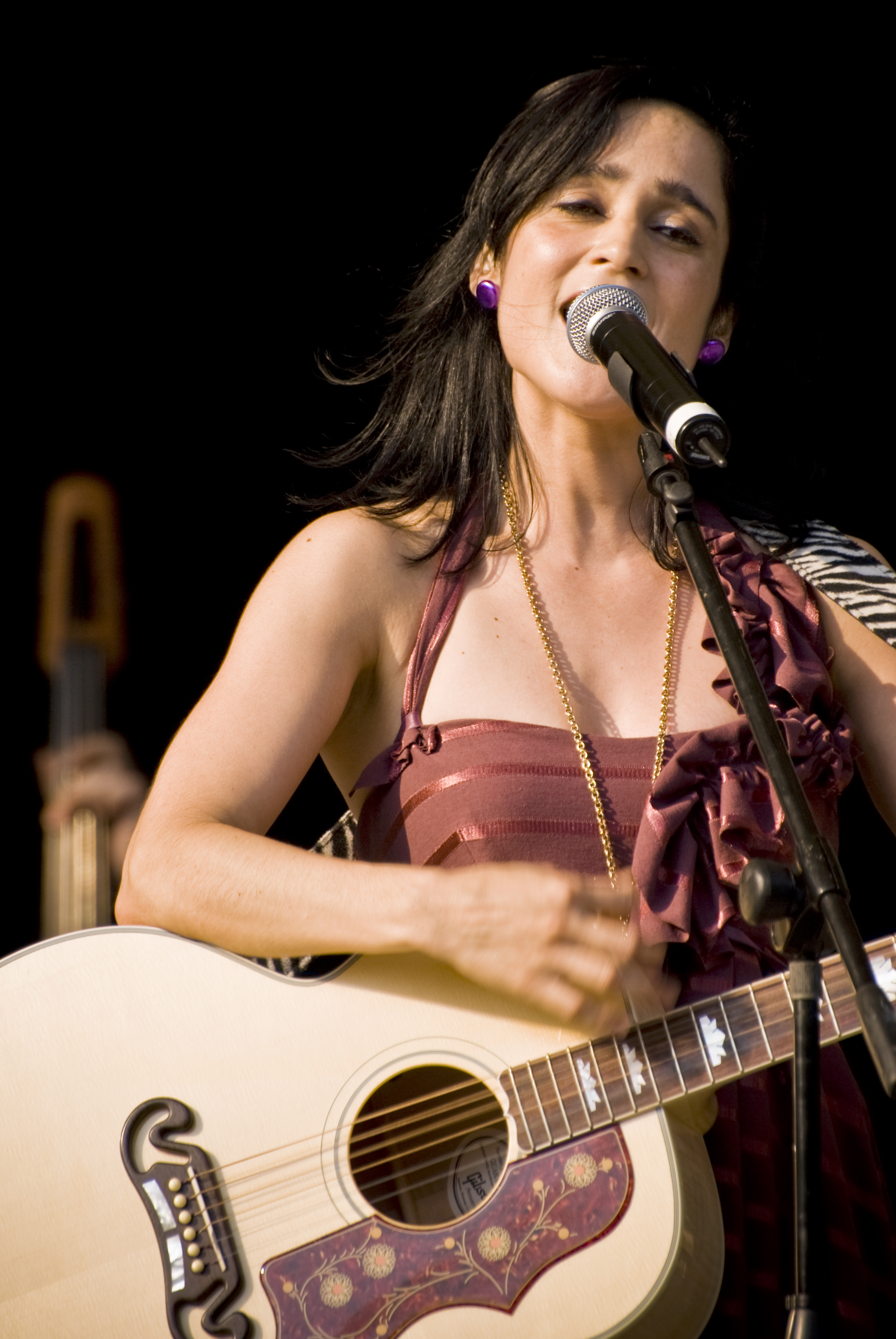
Mexican singer Julieta Venegas won the award in 2008.

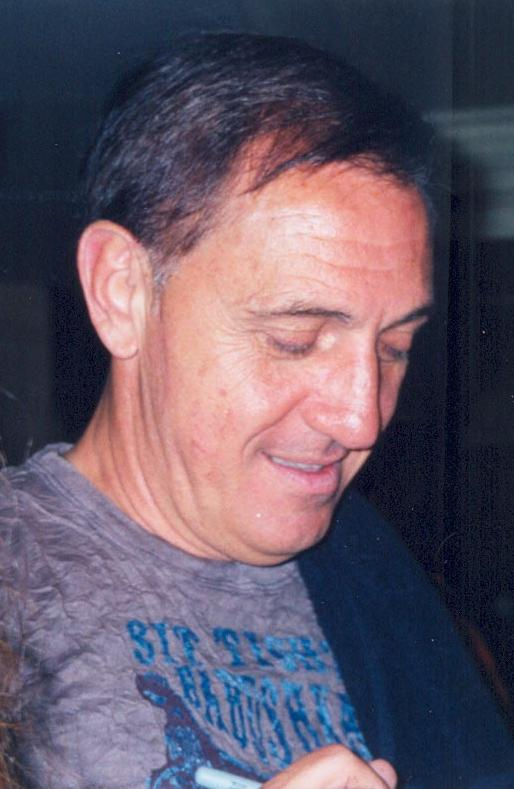
Venezuelan singer Franco De Vita won the award in 2011.

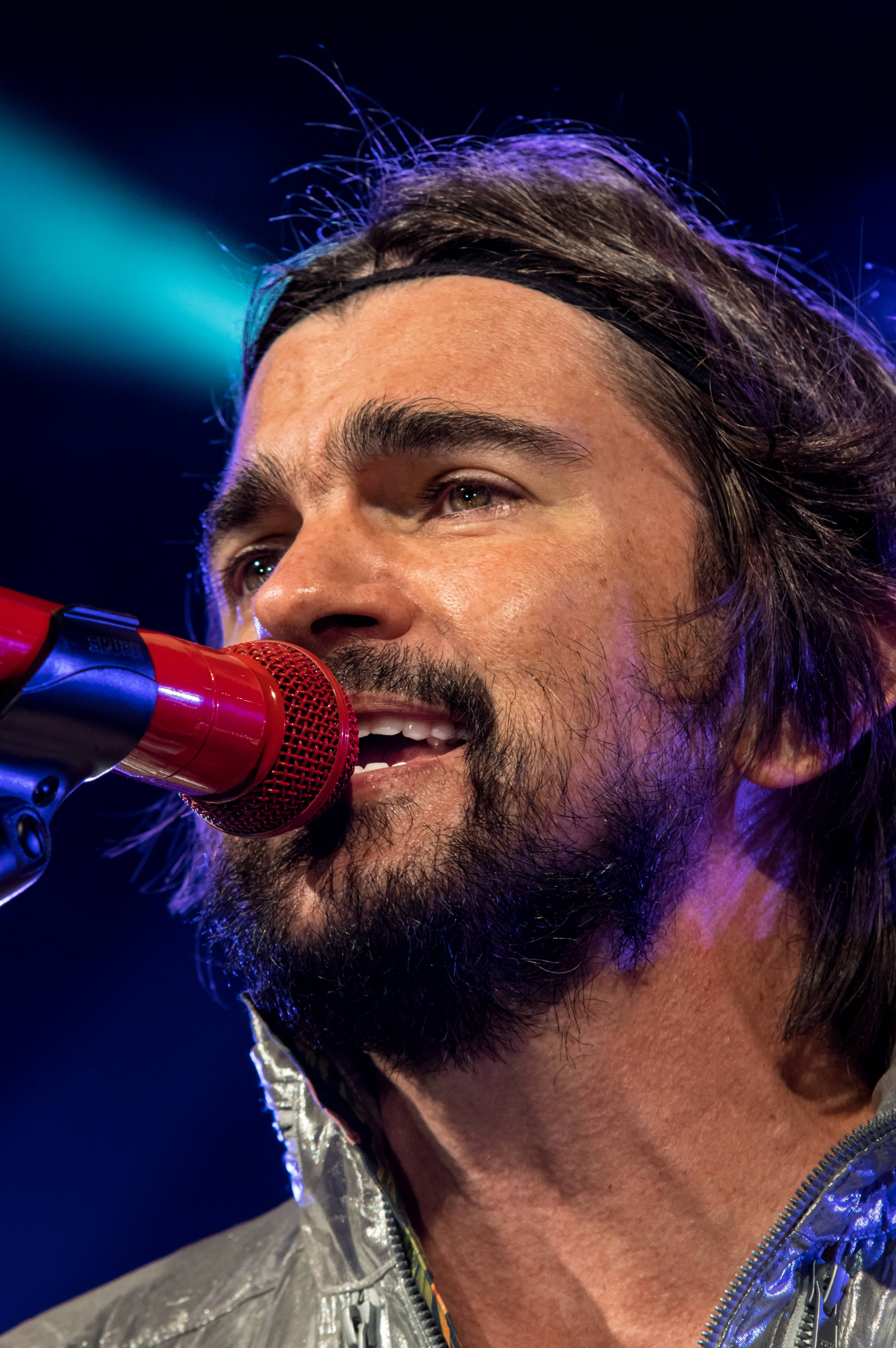
Colombian singer Juanes has won twice, in 2012 and 2015.

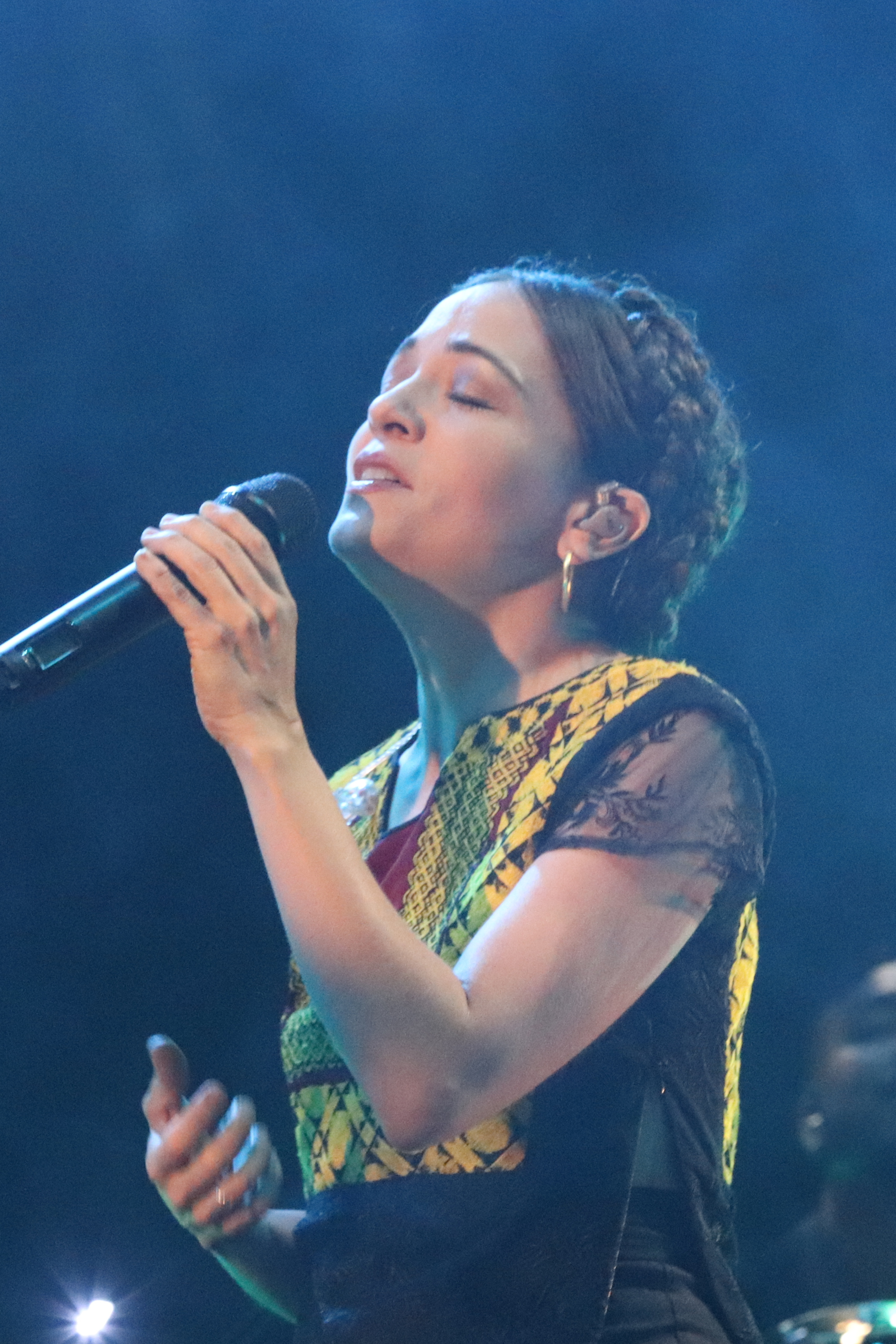
Three-time winner, Mexican singer Natalia Lafourcade.

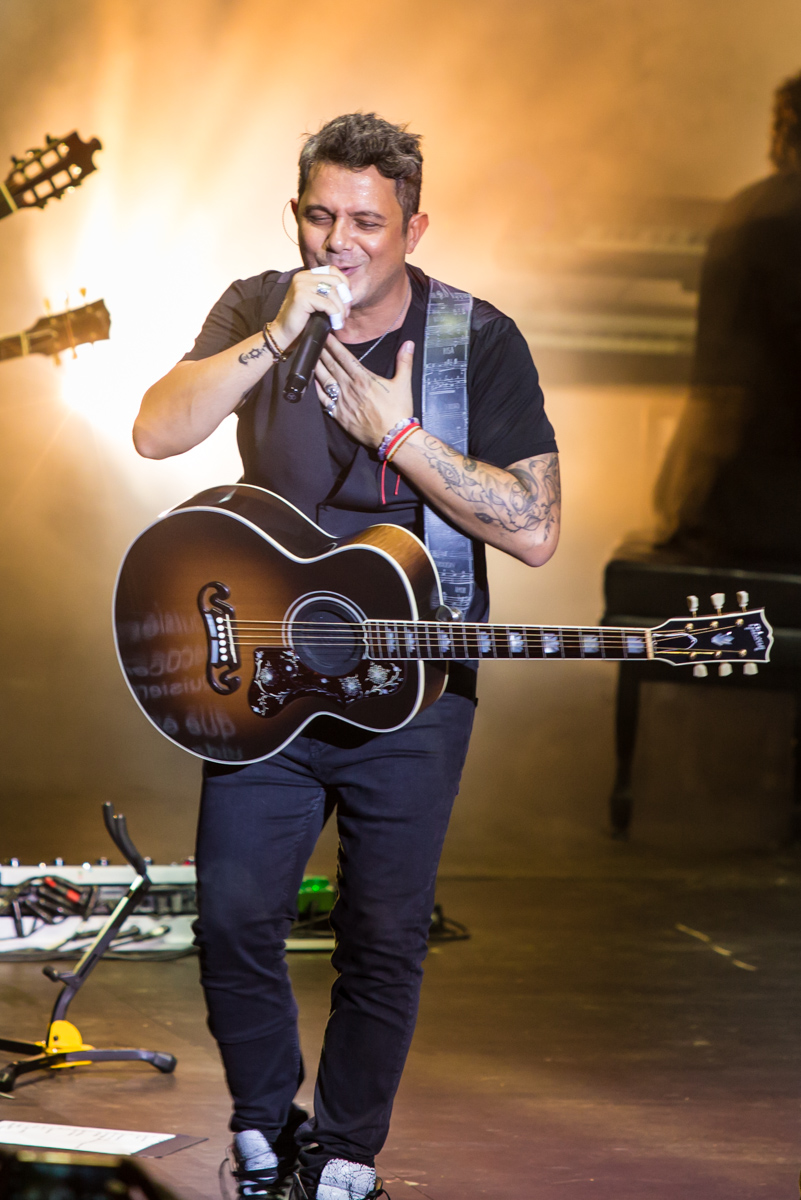
Spanish singer Alejandro Sanz has won twice, in 2016 and 2019.

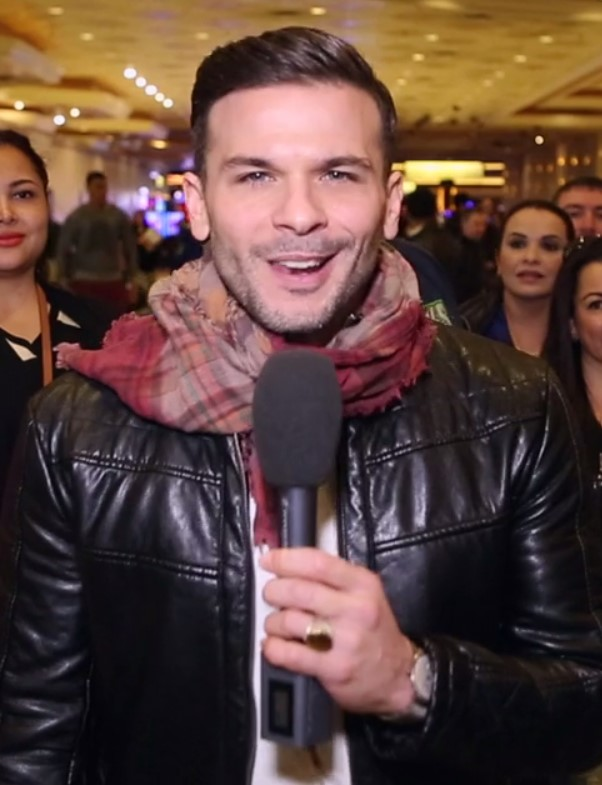
2018 winner Pedro Capó.

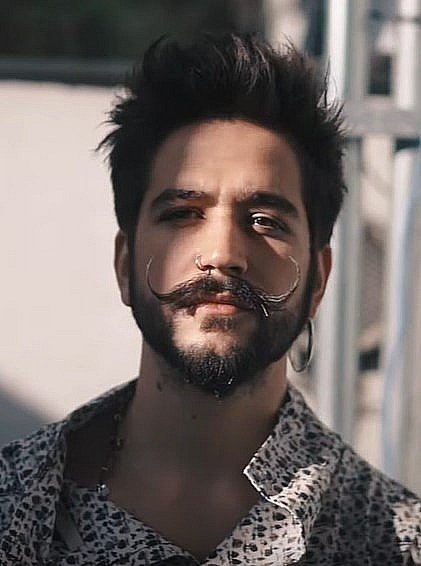
2023 winner Camilo.

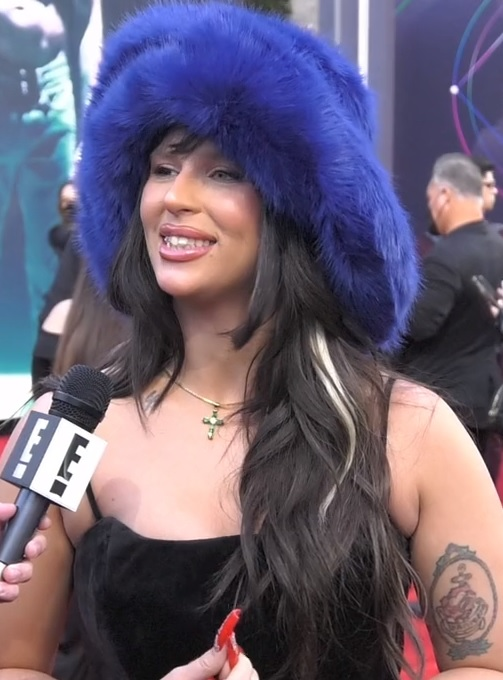
2024 winner Nathy Peluso.

Year	Performing artist(s)	Work	Director(s) and producer(s)	Nominees	Ref.
2006	Bebo and Cigala	Blanco y Negro En Vivo	Fernando Trueba, video director and video producer	Daniela Mercury – Baile Barroco (Daniel dos Santos, video director; Walter Costa, video producer); O Rappa – Acústico MTV (Joana Mazzuchelli, video director; Nani Escosteguy, video producer); Simone – Simone – Ao Vivo (Roberto Talma, video director; Moogie Canazio, video producer)	
2006	Café Tacuba	Un Viaje	Tito Lara, video director; Gerardo Gutiérrez, video producer	Daniela Mercury – Baile Barroco (Daniel dos Santos, video director; Walter Costa, video producer); O Rappa – Acústico MTV (Joana Mazzuchelli, video director; Nani Escosteguy, video producer); Simone – Simone – Ao Vivo (Roberto Talma, video director; Moogie Canazio, video producer)	
2007	Ricky Martin	MTV Unplugged	Manny Rodríguez, video director; Charlie Singer and Jose Tillan, video producers	Chico Buarque – A Série (Roberto De Oliveira, video director; Celso Tavares, video producer); Andrés Calamaro – Made In Argentina 2005 (José Luis Menegaz and Sebastian Viqueira, video directors; Audiovisuales S.A., video producer); Franco De Vita – Mil y Una Historias En Vivo (Victor Beltran and Roberto Pensó, video directors; Cesar Pulido, video producer); Ivete Sangalo – Multishow ao Vivo: Ivete no Maracanã (Joana Mazzucchelli, video director; Wilson Cunha, video producer)	
2008	Julieta Venegas	MTV Unplugged	Milton Lage, video director; Michael Dagnery and José Tillán, video producers	Miguel Bosé – Papitour (Eduardo Sánchez, video director; Manolo Roldán, video producer); Gloria Estefan – 90 Millas (Emilio Estefan, Jr., video director and video producers); Serrat and Sabina – Dos Pájaros de un Tiro (Luis Parraga, video director; Caster Films S.L., video producer); Various Artists – Buenos Aires, Dias y Noches de Tango (Omar Quiroga and Fabio Zabrowski, video directors; Andrés Mayo, video producer)	
2009	Roberto Carlos and Caetano Veloso	E A Música de Tom Jobim	Monique Gardenberg and Felipe Hirsch, video directors; Guto Graça Mello, video producer	Gian Marco – En Vivo Desde El Lunario (Ximena Cantuarias and Rafael Uriostegui, video director; Gian Marco Zignago, video producer); Robi Draco Rosa – Teatro (J. García, video director; Draco Rosa, video producer); Ivete Sangalo – Pode Entrar (Joana Mazzucchelli, video director and video producer); Tempo – Free Tempo: Victory (Carlos R. Pérez, video director; Bruce Henderson and Alejandro Navia, video producers)	
2010	Voz Veis	Una Noche Común y Sin Corriente	Néstor Moure, video director; Andres Guanipa, video producer	Jorge Drexler – La Trama Circular (Ariel Hassan, video director and video producer); León Gieco – Mundo Alas (León Gieco, Fernando Molnar & Sebastian Schindel, video directors; Gustavo Taranto & Virginia Taranto, video producers); Laura Pausini – Laura Live World Tour 09 (Gaetano Morbioli, video director; Laura Pausini, video producer); Thalía – Primera Fila (Nahuel Lerena, video director; Alicia Betoldi & Pinball, video producers)	
2011	Franco De Vita	En Primera Fila	Diego Alvarez, video director; Vicente Solís, video producer	Huáscar Barradas – Entre Amigos 2 En Vivo (Héctor Palma, video director; Lorena Salazar & Rafael Soler, video producers); Rubén Blades – Todos Vuelven Live DVD Vol. 1 and Vol. 2 (Ariel Rivas, video director and video producer); Maná – Drama y Luz (Rubén R. Bañuelos & Iván López Barba, video directors; Antonio "Toiz" Rodríguez Íñiguez, video producer); Alejandro Sanz – Canciones Para Un Paraíso - En Vivo (Fernando Olmo, video director; Teresa Ortíz, video producer); Zoé – Música de Fondo: MTV Unplugged (Miguel Roldán, video director; José "Fidji" Viggiano, video producer)	
2012	Juanes	MTV Unplugged	Ivan Dudynsky, video director; Charlie Singer & José Tillán, video producers	Caetano Veloso, Gilberto Gil and Ivete Sangalo – Especial Ivete, Gil e Caetano (Rafael Dragaud & Roberto Talma, video directors and video producers); Shakira – Live from Paris (Nick Wickham, video director; Emer Patten, video producer); Manuel Galbán – Blue Cha Cha (Ernesto Daranas Serrano, video director; Vania Valdés, video producer); Enrique Bunbury – Licenciado Cantinas, The Movie (Alexis Morante, video director; Sergio Abujas & Tamara Arias, video producer)	
2013	Natalia Lafourcade	Mujer Divina – Homenaje a Agustín Lara	Juan Luis Covarrubias, video director; Gonzalo Ferrari, video producer	Cartel de Santa – Me Atizo Macizo Tour (Diego Álvarez, video director; Aldo Ballesteros, video producer); Fuerzabruta – Wayra Tour (Leo Aramburú, video director; Corazón Animal, Fuerzabruta and Fernyo Moya, video producers); Fito Páez – El Amor Después del Amor: 20 Años (Diego Álvarez & Fito Páez, video director; Luciano Porri, video producer); Various Artists – Hecho Con Sabor a Puerto Rico (Kacho López Mari, video director; Tristana Robles, video producer)	
2014	Café Tacuba	El Objeto Antes Llamado Disco, La Película	Gregory Allen, video director and productor	Jesse & Joy – Soltando al Perro (Rubén R. Bañuelos, video director; Toiz Rodríguez, video producer); Santana – Corazón: Live from Mexico - Live It to Believe It (Nick Wickham, video director; Emer Patten, video producer); Various Artists – Música En Tiempos (Kacho López Mari, video director; Tristana Robles Reyes, video producer); Various Artists – Triana Pura Y Pura (Ricardo Pachón, video director; Ricardo Pachón and Gervasio Iglesias, video producers)	
2015	Juanes	Loco de Amor: La Historia	Kacho López, video director; María Tristana Robles, video producer	Pablo Alborán – Terral (Pedro Castro, video director and video producer); Kinky – MTV Unplugged (Miguel Roldán, video director; José Viggiano & Marc Zimet, video producers); Ara Malikian – 15 (Borja Echeverría Lamata, video director; Ara Malikian, video producer); Vicentico – Último Acto (Pablo Aparo & Martín Benchimol, video directors; Mariano Castellani, Laura Ricardes & Diego Saenz, video producers)	
2016	Alejandro Sanz	Sirope Vivo	Carlos Sánchez, video director and video producer	Babasónicos – Desde Adentro - Impuesto De Fe (En Vivo) (Diego Álvarez, video director; Gastón Etchechoury & Miguel Tafich, video producers); Bebe – 10 Años Con Bebe (Hernán Zin, director; Olmo Figueredo, Germán Gutiérrez, Nerio Gutiérrez, Sara Santaella & Hernán Zin, video producers); Dvicio – Justo Ahora y Siempre (Willy Rodríguez, video director; Juan Carlos Moguel, video producer); Eugenia León, Tania Libertad and Guadalupe Pineda – Primera Fila (Ricardo Calderón, video director; Ricardo Calderón & Ricardo Gascón, video producers)	
2017	Natalia Lafourcade	Musas, El Documental	Bruno Bancalari, video director; Juan Pablo López Fonseca, video producer	Miguel Bosé – MTV Unplugged (Miguel Roldán, video director; Luis Roberto López, video producer); Bronco – Primera Fila (Diego Álvarez, video director; Gastón Etchechoury & Miguel Tafich, video producers); Guaco – Semblanza (Alberto Arvelo, video director; Gilberto Aguado, Gustavo Aguado, Luis Fernando Borjas, Gabriela Camejo, Victor Márquez & Juan Carlos Salas, video producers); Juanes – Mis Planes Son Amarte (Kacho López Mari, video director; María Tristana Robles, producer)	
2018	Pedro Capó	En Letra De Otro - Documentary	Diego Álvarez, video director; Vicente Solís, video producer	La Santa Cecilia – Amar y Vivir Documentary (Charlie Nelson, video director; Coyote Media House & Rebeleon Entertainment, video producers); Los Pericos – 3.000 Vivos (Diego Álvarez, video director; Verónica Álvarez, video producer); Various Artists – Un Mundo Raro: Las Canciones De José Alfredo Jiménez (Rubén R. Bañuelos and Iván López Barba, video directors; Iván López Barba y Alex Briseño, video producers); Zoé – Panoramas (Gabriel Cruz Rivas and Rodrigo Guardiola, video directors and video producers)	
2019	Alejandro Sanz	Lo Que Fui Es Lo Que Soy	Mercedes Cantero, Oscar García Blesa, Gervasio Iglesias and Alexis Morante, video directors; Alvaro Agustin, Ghislain Barrois & Gervasio Iglesias, video producers	Mastodonte – Anatomía de Un Éxodo (Alfonso Cortés-Cabanillas and Asier Etxeandía, video directors; Jose Luis Huertas and Anibal Ruiz-Villar, video producers); Astor Piazzolla – Piazzolla, Los Años del Tiburón (Daniel Rosenfeld, video director and video producer); Draco Rosa – Hotel de Los Encuentros (Henry Duarte, José Luis Jiménez, Miguel Jiménez, Draco Rosa, Redamo Rosa and Revel Rosa, video directors; Hector Espinosa, Mio Hachimori, José Luis Jiménez, Miguel Jiménez, Draco Rosa, Revel Rosa & Sadaharu Yagi, video producers); Carlos Vives – Déjame Quererte (Juan Pablo Caballero and Felipe Cortés, video directors; Nathalie Burnside, video producer)	
2020	Carlos Vives	El Mundo Perdido de Cumbiana	Carlos Felipe Montoya, video director; Isabel Cristina Vásquez, video producer	Amaia – Una Vuelta al Sol (Marc Pujolar, video director; Júlia Orbegoso & David Serrano, video producers); Just Play Peru – The Warrior Women of Afro-Peruvian Music (Matt Geraghty, Araceli Poma & Daniel Thissen, video directors; Matt Geraghty & Araceli Poma, video producers); Los Tigres del Norte – Los Tigres del Norte at Folsom Prison (Tim Donahue, video director; Ilan Arboleda, Zach Horowitz, Los Tigres Del Norte & Jessicya Materano, video producers); Siddharta – "Relato de la Memoria Futuro" (Arturo Fabián De La Fuente & Cristóbal González Camarena, video directors; Arturo Fabián De La Fuente & Cristóbal González Camarena, video producers)	
2021	Juan Luis Guerra	Entre Mar y Palmeras	Jean Guerra, video director; Nelson Albareda, Amarilys Germán, Jean Guerra and Edgar Martínez, video producers	Café Tacvba – Un Segundo MTV Unplugged (Miguel Roldán, video director; Antonio Contreras Moya, video producer); Carolina Deslandes – Mulher (Filipe Correia Dos Santos, video director; Pedro Caldeirão, video producer); Juanes – Origen (Documental) (Kacho López Mari, video director; María Tristana Robles Reyes, video producer); Gastón Lafourcade – Quien Me Tañe Escucha Mis Voces (Documental) – (Bruno Bancalari, video director; Natalia Lafourcade & Juan Pablo López Fonseca, video producers)	
2022	Natalia Lafourcade	Hasta la Raíz: El Documental	Bruno Bancalari & Juan Pablo López-Fonseca, video directors; Juan Pablo López-Fonseca, video producer	Siudy Garrido – Bailaora - Mis Pies Son Mi Voz (Pablo Croce, video director; Pablo Croce, Siudy Garrido, Adrienne Arhst Center, video producer); Rosalía – Motomami (Rosalía Tiktok Live Performance) (Ferrán Echegaray, Rosalía & Stillz, video directors); Romeo Santos – Romeo Santos: King of Bachata (Devin Amar & Charles Todd, video directors; Katherine Aquino, Ned Doyle, Raphael Estrella, Sheira Rees-Davies, Amaury Rodríguez & James Rothman, video producers); Vetusta Morla – Matria (Patrick Knot, video director; Vetusta Morla, video producer)	
2023	Camilo	Camilo: El Primer Tour de Mi Vida	Camilo & Camilo Ríos, video directors; Mauricio Ríos, video producer	Dawer X Damper – Donde Machi - Album Completo (Ivan Vernaza, video director; Alejandro Velasco Ochoa, video producer); Fanm Zetwal – Fanm Zetwal, Una Historia de Vida u Milagros (Claudia Hernández Romero, video director; Francisco Núñez, video producer); Kenia Os – Universo K23 (Flakka, video director; Compostela Films & Art, video producer); Various Artists – Patria y Vida: The Power of Music (Beatriz Luengo, video director; Michael Fux, Beatriz Luengo, Gloria Rubin & Yotuel, video producers)	
2024	Nathy Peluso	Grasa (Album Long Form)	Agustin Puente, video director	AleMor – Beautiful Humans Vol 1. Documental (Wismer Jimenez, video director; AleMor & Wismer Jimenez, video producers); Jovem Mk – Meu Karma (Kaique Alves, Gabriel Avelar & Beto Galloni, video directors; Rodrigo Castello, Mariê Nunes & Eduardo Saraiva, video producers); Mau y Ricky – Hotel Caracas (Daniel Duran, video director; Alegna Espinoza & Maricel Zambrano, video producer); Rubio – Nacimos Llorando (Fernando Cattori, video director; Luis Betances, Fernando Cattori, Josep Pardo, Jaume Rigual, Ana Laura Solis, Aura Solis & Joe Solis, video producers)	
2025	Ca7riel & Paco Amoroso	Papota (Short Film)	Ferrán Echegaray & Martin Piroyansky, video directors; Armando Bo, Chino Fernández & Francisco Wechsler, video producers	Hodari – Iradoh - 3 Atos De Irmandade: A Música, O Crime E A Justiça (Kaique Alves & Thiago Eva, video directors; Marcelo Campana, Konrad Dantas, Thiago Freire, Bruno Pappa, Eduardo Saraiva, Kako Tufano & Angerson Vieira, video producers); Mon Laferte – Mon Laferte, Te Amo (Camila Grandi & Joanna Reposi Garibaldi, video directors; José Antonio San Miguel García, Diana Rodríguez, Simran Singh & Jaime Villarreal, video producers); Gaby Moreno – Lamento (Extended Cut) (Diego Contreras, video director; Andrew Petersen, video producer); Various Artists – Milton Bituca Nascimento (Flavia Moraes, video director; Ricardo Aidar, Caio Gullane, Fabiano Gullane, Rafael Langoni, Flávia Moraes, Augusto Nascimento, Andre Novis, Victor Pozas & Larissa Prado, video producers)	

== Notes ==
^{^[I]} Each year is linked to the article about the Latin Grammy Awards held that year.
^{^[II]} Showing the name of the performer and the nominated album
