= Yo Contra Ti =

2017 song by Puerto Rican rapper Daddy Yankee

Single by Daddy Yankee featuring Puerto Rico Symphony Orchestra
- Language: Spanish
- English title: "Me Against You"
- Released: September 1, 2017
- Recorded: June – July 2017
- Studio: La Huerta Music Studios (Madrid, Spain); Playbach Studios (San Juan, Puerto Rico); Sala Sinfónica Pablo Casals (Santurce, Puerto Rico)
- Genre: Hip hop
- Length: 3:51
- Songwriter: Ramón Ayala
- Producer: Echo

Daddy Yankee singles chronology
"Hula Hoop" (2017)	"Yo Contra Ti" (2017)

Music video
- "Yo Contra Ti" on YouTube

"Yo Contra Ti" (Spanish pronunciation: [ʝo kontɾa ti]; English: "Me Against You") is a song by Puerto Rican rapper Daddy Yankee featuring the Puerto Rico Symphony Orchestra. It was composed for a breast cancer campaign in partnership with foundations Susan G. Komen Puerto Rico and J. Walter Thompson. The song was released on September 1, 2017 accompanied by a music video directed by Kacho López and filmed at a Comprehensive Cancer Center in Puerto Rico. The clip shows a woman with breast cancer being injected during a chemotherapy process which gives her strength, proceeding to stand up and lip-sync the lyrics while Daddy Yankee performs the track. The song was written by Daddy Yankee and was produced by Echo, with additional production by Beatboy and Daddy Yankee.

It is a hip hop song with lyrics about breast cancer and empowerment, representing the struggle of women who are diagnosed with it. "Yo Contra Ti" has been critically well received, garnering Susan G. Komen Puerto Rico and J. Walter Thompson numerous awards for its campaign, as well as five nominations at the 2018 Cannes Lions International Festival of Creativity for the song and music video. "Yo Contra Ti" was nominated for a Latin Grammy Award for Best Urban Fusion/Performance at the 19th Latin Grammy Awards. Commercially, the single failed to rank on any chart, although it was reported that the campaign has amassed over a million dollars for Susan G. Komen.

== Background and release ==
On August 2, 2017, Daddy Yankee announced a partnership with Susan G. Komen Puerto Rico foundation to raise funds for women with breast cancer on his natal Puerto Rico after learning that a close friend of his was diagnosed with cancer. He interacted with cancer patients in order to "capture how they feel and give voice to their anger." He stated that his perspective about how the disease is handled changed after meeting them. Daddy Yankee wanted to write motivational and positive lyrics because he believes that "sometimes the themes directed to this goal incline towards pain and pity, and is the least that a person wants to feel in those moments." Amarilis Reyes, executive director of Susan G. Komen Puerto Rico, said that the track represents "the feeling of our survivors and a clear message of our purpose." According to Puerto Rican newspaper El Nuevo Día, breast cancer "is the leading cause of death in females per year on the island."

The song marks the first collaboration between the Puerto Rico Symphony Orchestra and an urban act. Puerto Rican musician and director of the orchestra Ángel "Cucco" Peña stated that "the frontiers that have traditionally separated classical and popular music have disappeared in the 21st century." He also hopes that "this new initiative will serve to facilitate new projects that contribute to the country and our culture." Daddy Yankee expressed that recording with the Puerto Rico Symphony Orchestra "was something that was on [his] bucket list."

The track was recorded at La Huerta Music Studios in Madrid, Spain, at Playbach Studios in San Juan, Puerto Rico, and at the Sala Sinfónica Pablo Casals in Santurce, Puerto Rico. It was produced by Puerto Rican record producer Echo, who had previously worked on a similar project titled "Porque Soy Tempo" by Puerto Rican rapper Tempo featuring the London Symphony Orchestra in 2008. Daddy Yankee and Mexican record producer Beatboy served as additional producers. The song was mixed by Echo and Spanish recording engineer Rafa Sardina at After Hours Studios in Woodland Hills, California. Sardina has stated that the track "brings together two worlds that until now were quite distant in many people's minds, the urban world and the classical world." He described the musical arrangements as "very classical with cinematic hues."

On August 30, 2017, Daddy Yankee announced that "the genre's biggest tiraera (diss track) is approximating." The song was digitally released on September 1, 2017, a few hours after the premiere of the music video. The single's cover art is composed by a shot from the music video and features cancer patient Jessie Reyes, who is shown smiling after receiving an injection on her chest during a chemotherapy process. Daddy Yankee stated that the fifty percent of the profits from digital downloads and track streams will be donated to the Susan G. Komen Puerto Rico foundation. J. Walter Thompson reported that the song garnered over a million dollars in charity and that it was "transformed into a fundraising platform for the Susan G. Komen Foundation."

== Composition ==
"Yo Contra Ti" is a hip hop song with a length of three minutes and fifty-one seconds. In the song, Daddy Yankee takes the role of a patient with breast cancer diagnose, and the lyrics are about empowerment. In the intro and the first verse, he reflects the feeling of an ill woman since the diagnose of the disease, thinking about life and death, and how it would affect her beloved ones. As time passes, she notices how his body is changing and has to confront the mirror's raw reflection of her every day. She also talks about beauty despite her hair loss, stating that "not all princesses have long hair." She then begins to confront her cancer by asking angrily "who are you to tear my life source breasts?" and "who are you to tear this flower's petals?" and decides to fight against it instead of becoming a victim.

The chorus of the song is a war declaration, stating that one of them would be victorious, promising that she will not surrender, and yelling the words "fuck cancer." In the second verse, the woman expresses that it wants to see her dead and that she is listening to a voice saying "you are in Nazarene's hands." She metaphorically separates her body from her soul, stating that the cancer could touch her flesh and skin but it could not break her faith. The verse ends by affirming that her spirit is stronger and that she already has won the war even if she faces death. In the outro, Daddy Yankee says that "when the tears fall and the pain grows, Philippians 4:13." This Bible verse reads "I can do all things through Christ who strengthens me."

Daddy Yankee explained that the song's last lines are "very spiritual" by stating that "cancer can take your body but not your identity" and that "even if death comes, it won't steal who you are."

== Music video ==
=== Background ===
A music video for the single premiered on August 31, 2017 on Daddy Yankee's official YouTube channel and was directed by Puerto Rican Latin Grammy Award-winner Kacho Lopez Mari. Filming of the music video took place at the Puerto Rican Comprehensive Cancer Center in San Juan, Puerto Rico on August 22, 2017. Kacho Lopez had previously worked with other Latin American acts including Puerto Rican band Calle 13, Colombian musician Juanes, and Puerto Rican singer Ricky Martin. Cinematographer Santiago "Chago" Bennet Mari served as director of photography. The clip features breast-cancer-diagnosed women including Carmen Hernández, Yesenia Mercado, Vicky Núñez, Nayda Ortiz, Zulma Rodríguez, Martiza Perea, and Jessie Reyes, whose experiences inspired Daddy Yankee to write the song. Puerto Rican actress Cordelia González has a brief appearance as a nurse.

=== Synopsis ===
The clip centers around a cancer-diagnosed woman, portrayed by actual cancer patient Jessie Reyes, who ensures that she will fight against the disease instead of giving up her life. The video starts introducing her, who was diagnosed with breast cancer on February 27, 2017. She is at a hospital and is escorted by a nurse to a chair. The woman is injected during a chemotherapy process and stands up while smiling, and proceeds to lyp-sinc the lyrics in front of her breast's bone scan. Daddy Yankee is shown in various cameras performing the song alone and then with the Puerto Rico Symphony Orchestra in a room with lights that interweaves between black, white, and red colours. The clip ends with a text which says "dedicated to all warriors who have fought and those who continue to fight the battle", highlighting the word "continue" as the rest of the sentence fades away.

== Reception ==
An editor of American news website Univisión stated that both the song and the music video "could be considered one of Daddy Yankee's best musical works of the past years." "Yo Contra Ti" garnered foundations Susan G. Komen and J. Walter Thompson Puerto Rico the Radio Mercury Award for Integrated Campaign with Radio/Audio and silver El Sol Awards for Long Format Audiovisual Piece, Online Video and Audio Production, Drafting in 2018. The campaign also received SME Digital Awards for Best Social Responsibility Campaign and Best Use of Content Marketing at the 11th SME Digital Awards. It has also received merit The One Club Awards for Film / Long Form and Online / Streaming Audio, Single or Campaign. The song and music video garnered five nominations at the 2018 Cannes Lions International Festival of Creativity, receiving a Bronze Lion award for Radio & Audio, Not-for-Profit/Charity.

=== Music awards ===
Ceremony	Date	Category	Result
Latin Grammy Awards	November 15, 2018	Best Urban Fusion/Performance	Nominated

=== Advertising awards ===
Ceremony	Date	Category	Result
Cannes Lions International Festival of Creativity	June 18–22, 2018	Entertainment for Music, Use of Original Composition	Nominated
Cannes Lions International Festival of Creativity	June 18–22, 2018	Entertainment for Music, Production of Exclusive Artist; Content in Partnership with a Brand or a Cause	Nominated
Cannes Lions International Festival of Creativity	June 18–22, 2018	Radio & Audio, Not-for-Profit/Charity	Bronze
Cannes Lions International Festival of Creativity	June 18–22, 2018	Social & Influencer, Content Marketing-Partnerships	Nominated
Cannes Lions International Festival of Creativity	June 18–22, 2018	Social & Influencer, Content Marketing-Social Video	Nominated
Cannes Lions International Festival of Creativity	June 18–22, 2018	Social & Influencer, Content Marketing-Content Creation	Nominated
El Sol Awards	June 2, 2018	Long Format Audiovisual Piece, Online Video	Silver
El Sol Awards	June 2, 2018	Best Use of Influencers	Gold
El Sol Awards	June 2, 2018	Audio Production – Drafting	Silver
Radio Mercury Awards	May 31, 2018	Integrated Campaign with Radio/Audio	Won
SME Digital Awards	May 17, 2018	Best Social Responsibility Campaign	Gold
SME Digital Awards	May 17, 2018	Best Video Execution	Silver
SME Digital Awards	May 17, 2018	Best Use of Content Marketing	Gold

Other

- The One Club Awards 2018: Merit awards for Radio: Online / Streaming Audio, Single or Campaign and Health, Wellness & Pharma: Film / Long Form.

== Credits and personnel ==
Credits adapted from Primera Hora.

Locations

- Recorded at La Huerta Music Studios in Madrid, Spain; Playbach Studios in San Juan, Puerto Rico; and Sala Sinfónica Pablo Casals in Santurce, Puerto Rico
- Mixed at After Hours Studios in Woodland Hills, California

Personnel

- Beatboy – additional producer
- DJ Drozer – scratching
- Echo – producer, mixing, recording engineer
- Edy Lan – orchestration
- Ángel "Cucco" Peña – musical director
- Puerto Rico Symphony Orchestra – violin, cello, double bass, trombone, trumpet, tuba, saxophone, western concert flute, cymbal, xylophone, and tenor drum
- Rafa Sardina – mixing, recording engineer
- Daddy Yankee – songwriting, additional producer, lead vocals
