= Roberto Carlos e Caetano Veloso e a Música de Tom Jobim =

Roberto Carlos e Caetano Veloso e a música de Tom Jobim

Live album by Roberto Carlos and Caetano Veloso
- Released: November 16, 2008
- Recorded: August 25–26, 2008
- Venue: Ibirapuera Auditorium, São Paulo, Brazil
- Genre: Bossa nova; MPB
- Length: 59:12
- Label: Sony BMG

Roberto Carlos chronology
Roberto Carlos En Vivo (2008)	Roberto Carlos e Caetano Veloso e a música de Tom Jobim (2008)	Elas Cantam Roberto Carlos (2009)

Caetano Veloso chronology
Multishow ao Vivo: Cê (2007)	Roberto Carlos e Caetano Veloso e a música de Tom Jobim (2008)	Zii e Zie (2009)

Roberto Carlos e Caetano Veloso e a Música de Tom Jobim (lit. 'Roberto Carlos and Caetano Veloso and the Music of Tom Jobim') is a live album by Brazilian singers and composers Roberto Carlos and Caetano Veloso in honor of the 50th anniversary of bossa nova, released on CD and DVD in 2008.

== Background ==
Despite their decades-long friendship, Roberto Carlos and Caetano Veloso had never recorded an album together. In an interview with G1, Globo Group's news portal, Roberto said, "It was very emotional. I was nervous because, although I sang Bossa nova at the beginning of my career, it's been a long time. We don't feel so comfortable in that genre, and alongside Caetano, I was even more nervous.”In the same interview, Caetano added to Roberto's comments, “Roberto sings much better than I do. That's not just flattery, it's a statement of fact. For me, it was wonderful.”

Recorded at the Ibirapuera Auditorium in São Paulo during the Tribute to Antônio Carlos Jobim concert held on August 25 and 26, 2008, the show was produced in audio and video by Rede Globo, with support from Itaú bank through the Itaú Brasil cultural project. Previously, a concert was held at the Municipal Theater in Rio de Janeiro. According to journalist Mônica Bergamo, from the Folha de S. Paulo newspaper, Roberto said to Caetano, “I'm so fucking nervous!".

The musicians from Caetano's band (BandaCê) and Roberto's band (RC9) participated in the show, as well as both artists' accompanists (Jaques Morelenbaum in the first two duets and in Caetano's songs; Eduardo Lages in Roberto's songs and in the final duets). The song Águas de Março features musician Daniel Jobim, Tom's grandson.

== Release ==
Sony Music released the album on CD and DVD. On the Roberto Carlos Especial, a special year-end program broadcast by TV Globo, some of the songs that Caetano and Roberto performed on the album were shown again on the television special.

== Reception ==
Journalist and music curator Marcus Preto gave the album a positive review in the Brazilian edition of Rolling Stone magazine, stating, "Beyond the immediate pleasure its beauty can bring, Roberto and Caetano's tribute album to Tom Jobim serves as a map of affinities and idiosyncrasies. We understand from it that the tropicalist imagination still harbors some fear of the fifty-year-old movement that inspired it, possibly caused by excessive respect. [...] They seemed to know, before any of us, that, in the end, 'Eu Sei que Vou Te Amar' (Tom and Vinicius) and 'Eu Te Amo, Te Amo, Te Amo' (Roberto and Erasmo) are all the same thing."

Sylvia Colombo, writing for the Folha de São Paulo newspaper, gave the show a negative review, rating it as "bad" and stating that "when they sang together, they were artificial, with forced smiles and half-hearted hugs. There was some humor in ‘Teresa da Praia’. Nothing special in ‘A Felicidade’. [...] Poor Tom Jobim..."

Bernardo Araújo wrote a positive review for the newspaper Extra, adding that it was "a historic event, commensurate with the stature of the honoree and his work."

== Track listing ==
=== CD ===
All music is composed by Tom Jobim.

No.	Title	Writer(s)	Interpreter(s)	Length
1.	"Garota de Ipanema"	Tom Jobim / Vinicius de Moraes	Roberto Carlos and Caetano Veloso	3:55
2.	"Wave"	Tom Jobim	Roberto Carlos and Caetano Veloso	3:09
3.	"Águas de Março"	Tom Jobim	Daniel Jobim	3:28
4.	"Por Toda a Minha Vida (Exaltação ao Amor)"	Tom Jobim / Marino Pinto	Caetano Veloso	3:10
5.	"Ela É Carioca"	Tom Jobim / Vinicius de Moraes	Caetano Veloso	3:16
6.	"Inútil Paisagem"	Tom Jobim / Aloysio de Oliveira	Caetano Veloso	3:52
7.	"Meditação"	Tom Jobim / Newton Mendonça	Caetano Veloso	3:32
8.	"O Que Tinha de Ser"	Tom Jobim / Vinicius de Moraes	Caetano Veloso	4:11
9.	"Insensatez"	Tom Jobim / Vinicius de Moraes	Roberto Carlos	4:10
10.	"Por Causa de Você"	Tom Jobim / Dolores Duran		4:47
11.	"Ligia"	Tom Jobim	Tom Jobim	3:30
12.	"Corcovado"	Tom Jobim	Roberto Carlos	2:41
13.	"Samba do Avião"	Tom Jobim	Roberto Carlos	2:23
14.	"Eu Sei Que Vou Te Amar / Soneto da Fidelidade" (incidental music: Soneto da Fidelidade)	Tom Jobim / Vinicius de Moraes	Roberto Carlos	4:46
15.	"Tereza da Praia"	Tom Jobim / Billy Blanco	Caetano Veloso	3:40
16.	"Chega de Saudade"	Tom Jobim / Vinicius de Moraes	Caetano Veloso	4:34
Total length:				59:12

== Accolades ==
The album was nominated for a Latin Grammy in 2009 in the Best Long Form Music Video category. At a ceremony held at the Mandalay Bay Events Center in Las Vegas, Nevada, in the United States, the album was the winner of the night in its category.

Year	Award	Category	Venue	Result	Ref.
2009	Latin Grammy Award	Best Long Form Music Video	Mandalay Bay Events Center, Las Vegas, Nevada, United States	Won	

== Musicians ==
The following musicians worked on the album:

- Paulinho Braga – drums
- Daniel Jobim – piano
- Caetano Veloso – vocals
- Jaques Morelenbaum – conductor
- Gustavo Menezes – violin
- Edith Maretzki – violin
- José Ricardo Volker Taboada – viola
- Carlos Roberto Mendes – violin
- Gabriel Improta – acoustic guitar
- Oswaldo Luiz Teodoro de Carvalho – violin
- Daniel Nogueira de Albuquerque – violin
- Carlos Malta – alto flute
- Daniel Guedes – violin
- Marcus Ribeiro Oliveira – cello
- Antonella Lima Pareschi – iolin
- Dener de Castro Campolina – double bass
- José Alves da Silva – violin
- José Rogério Rosa – iolin
- Carlos Eduardo Hack – violin
- Márcio Eymard Mallard – cello
- Michel Bessler – violin
- Jesuína Noronha Passaroto – viola
- Marie Christine Springuel – viola
- Jorge Kundert Ranevsky (Iura) – cello
- João Daltro de Almeida – violin
- Jorge Helder – double bass
- Bernardo Bessler – violin
- Ricardo Amado – violin
- Roberto Carlos – vocals
