= Sabreen =

Palestinian musical group

Sabreen صابرين

Background information
- Origin: East Jerusalem, Palestine
- Genres: Arabic music; folklore; jazz; rock
- Years active: 1980–2002
- Members: Said Murad; Kamilya Jubran; Odeh Tourjam; Issa Freij; Jamal Mughrabi; Yacoub Abu Arafeh; Issam Murad; Samer Musalem; Wissam Murad
- Website: www.sabreen.org

Sabreen (Arabic: صابرين, romanized: Ṣābirīn, lit. '[the] patient ones' or 'those awaiting'; cf. sabr) is a Palestinian musical group. Based in East Jerusalem, Sabreen was founded in 1980 by Said Murad. Their vision focused on the development of the Palestinian modern song, reflecting the humanitarian and cultural reality in general, and the suffering endured from the political situation in particular. Sabreen's members have changed over the years, the most notable members were Said Murad, Kamilya Jubran, Odeh Tourjman, Issa Freij, Yacoub Abu Arafeh, Issam Murad, Samer Mussallem, and Wissam Murad. Said Murad is the composer and arranger of the music, and Kamilya Jubran was the lead vocalist on four albums out of the five studio albums released.

In 1987, the Sabreen Association for Artistic Development was established as a non-profit, community-based organization specializing in the promotion of music in Palestine and combining it with different artistic expressions and forms.

== Music ==
During the 1970s there were two types of bands: westernized bands that played western instruments and eastern bands that played eastern instruments. Sabreen presented a mix that merged the gaps between the two styles blending elements of traditional Arab and Eastern music with international influences from Indian music to African music to American jazz and blues. Sabreen helped introduce a trend of committed music, or "Multazimeh", which was gaining popularity in Egypt with Sheikh Imam and Ahmed Fouad Negm, and in Lebanon with Marcel Khalife and Ziad Rahbani. The music's soundscape incorporated Eastern instruments like the oud, kawal, buzuq, and qanun, while also incorporating Western instruments such as the guitar, violin, cello, and double bass.

The lyrics of Sabreen's songs are mostly by renowned poets such as Mahmoud Darwish, Samih al-Qasim, Hussein Barghouti, and Fadwa Touqan.

The group has released four albums with the lead singer Kamilya Jubran, and another one after she left the group. Each album was released at an important political juncture. The first one "Dukhan al-Barakin" (Smoke of Volcanoes) was released in the early 1980s coinciding with the Israeli invasion of Lebanon and the Sabra and Shatila massacres. The songs included poems by Palestinian poets including Mahmoud Darwish and Samih al-Qasim, and style was rooted in folklore. Their second album "Mawt al-Nabi" (Death of the Prophet) was made during a particularly introspective period before the First Intifada, focusing on everyday life under Israeli occupation. This album was an act of resistance with a clear-cut message. "Jayy al-Hamam" (Here Come the Doves), was released next in 1994, was upbeat, in keeping with the hope fostered by the Oslo Accords. The fourth CD, "Ala Fein" (Where to?) released in 2000, uses poems by Talal Haydar, Sayyed Hegab and the Fadwa Tuqan (Palestine), conveying a sense of deep nostalgia and despair.

In 2002, Kamilya Jubran left the band and moved to France to pursue a solo career. Sabreen released another album titled Maz'ooj which saw a departure from the band's sound. The electro-infused album included lyrics by Said Murad and vocals by Palestinian actor Mohammad Bakri.

== Sabreen Association for Artistic Development ==
In 1987, Sabreen was registered as a community-based NGO with the goal of developing music in Palestine. Sabreen plays the role of a music resource organization organizing summer camps, workshops, festivals, and training many Palestinian musicians. The Sabreen offices and recording studio are based in Sheikh Jarrah, East Jerusalem. It has served as an important cultural organization and taken on many important projects. Under an agreement with the Palestinian Ministry of Education, Sabreen has introduced a music curriculum into Palestinian schools. Countless artists have passed through Sabreen Studios in Jerusalem through productions, workshops, and programs, including Tamer Nafar, Hatari, Coldplay, Bashar Murad, Apo and the Apostles, Shadia Mansour, Le Trio Joubran, and Reem Talhami. In 2007, Sabreen launched the "Palestinian Eurovision" initiative in partnership with the Palestinian Broadcasting Corporation and Superflex, with the aim towards Palestine debuting in the Eurovision Song Contest.

== Members ==
=== Main members ===
- Said Murad: Composer & Arranger, Oud, Percussion, Kawal, Rababa, Lyrics (Maz’ouj)
- Kamilya Jubran: Vocals, Qanoon, Buzuq, Percussions
- Odeh Tourjman: Vocals, Contrabass,
- Issa Freij: Guitar, Contrabass
- Jamal Mughrabi: Buzuq
- Yacoub Abu Arafeh: Percussion
- Issam Murad: Drums, Sound Engineer
- Samer Musalem: Backing Vocals
- Wissam Murad: Vocals, Oud, Percussion, Oud, Keyboard

=== Other Members ===
- Nell Catchpole: Violin
- Chris Smith: Acoustic Guitar, Saxophone
- Sarah Murcia: Contrebass
- Matt Sharp: Cello
- Valerie Pearson: Violin
- Samer Khoury: Tambourine
- Sherly Smart: Cello

== Discography ==
- "Smoke of the Volcanoes" - 1984
- "Death of the Prophet" - 1987
- "Here Come The Doves" - 1994
- "Ala Fein?" (Where To?) - 2000
- "Maz'ooj" - 2002

== Usage in media ==
A version of the song "On Man" was featured in the 2009 documentary film Checkpoint Rock: Canciones desde Palestina (Songs from Palestine).
