= Puerto Rico Symphony Orchestra =

Musical ensemble sponsored by the Government of Puerto Rico

- Orchestra
- Founded: 1958; 68 years ago
- Location: San Juan, Puerto Rico
- Concert hall: Sala Sinfónica Pablo Casals
- Music director: Maximiliano Valdés
- Website: www.ospr.pr.gov

The Puerto Rico Symphony Orchestra (PRSO) (Orquesta Sinfónica de Puerto Rico in Spanish) a musical ensemble sponsored by the Government of Puerto Rico. It has 80 regular musicians from around the world performing a 52-week season which includes symphonic concerts, operas, ballets, pops, and other activities. The PRSO has hosted various artists, including Plácido Domingo, Luciano Pavarotti, Justino Díaz, Kiri Te Kanawa, and Alicia de Larrocha, among others, and has performed in various Central and South American countries as well as in the United States.

In addition to its regular season, the PRSO also organizes several concerts and activities for the purpose of fulfilling Don Casals's dream of fostering classical music in Puerto Rico. These activities include: Conoce tu Orquesta (“Know Your Orchestra”), La Sinfónica en tu Pueblo (“The Orchestra In Your Town”), La Sinfónica en las Universidades (“The Orchestra in Universities”), and La Sinfónica en los Residenciales (“The Orchestra In The Projects”; i.e. public housing), as well as performing in the annual Casals Festival.

== History ==
The history of the PRSO dates back to 1958 when famed cellist Don Pablo Casals visited the island to see his family and to discover the land where his mother was born. Soon after, he would dedicate most of his work to foster classical music in Puerto Rico. In 1957, he organized the first annual Casals Festival, where he invited classical musicians to perform several concerts to Puerto Ricans and tourists alike. It was during this multi-week festival that state legislator Ernesto Ramos Antonini presented a bill which would create the Puerto Rico Symphony Orchestra, receiving much praise and support from both the public and other state legislators. After the law was signed by then Governor of Puerto Rico Luis Muñoz Marín, the task of organizing the orchestra was given to the same group which organized the Casals Festival. The first live concert was performed on November 6, 1958, in Mayagüez, hometown of Don Pablo Casals's mother.

Beginning with a payroll that included few Puerto Ricans the PRSO inaugurated with a six-concert tour in the municipalities of San Juan, Mayagüez and Ponce. After being contracted to work at the Conservatory of Music of Puerto Rico, Adolfo Odnoposoff also joined the PRSO as the first chair of the cello. Odonoposoff alumni Orlando Guillotina would also serve as part of the cello section. In 1970, Rafael Bracero López joined the orchestra, becoming known for his work as Vice President of the Federación de Músicos de Puerto Rico. In 1975, Tevah contacted Abraham Peña -President of the Association of Musicians- about the participation of the PRSO at the 1976, and made reference to a conversation with Marta Casals. The widow of the titular figure contacted Elías López and disclosed the Tevah-Peña letter and discusses, among other things, the competency of "some elements" to complete the task. In December 1975, Tevah was suspended. Six months after the initial letter, Tevah's contract was waived by the board.

After the New Progressive Party (PNP) won the elections, the Federación de Música made it clear through Héctor Campos Parsi that they demanded the elimination of Casals Festival or the replacement of López with Tevah as director of the PRSO. This marked a departure from Peña's posture on replacing several members of the orchestra if they were to participate at the 1976 Festival and was likely an strategic move to have the support of the musicians. A strike then began on January 8, 1977. Several were members of the PRSO and at least a fifth were part of the Conservatory of Music. The PRSO participated in the 1977 Festival under protest, but citing a "duty towards the people of Puerto Rico". However, a group known as Comité Representativo de la Orquesta PRSO de Puerto Rico issued a press release claiming that local musicians received much less pay than foreigners ($437 p/w vs. $185 p/w) and called it an "abuse".

Another strike took place in 1979 under the new president of the Federation of Musicians, Ángel Náter, leading to the cancellation of that year's festival and the appointment of Sidney Harth as director. The strike led to then president of the Senate of Puerto Rico to make a call for "promotion of Arts as a goal", which preceded the approval of several laws altering the musical and cultural landscape the following year, replacing Festival Casals Inc. with the Administración para el Fomento de las Artes y la Cultura. Among them were Law 44 which created the Corporación de la Orquesta Sinfónica de Puerto Rico and Law 77 which created the Corporación del Conservatorio de Música de Puerto Rico, both of them falling under the new umbrella. In 1979, director John Barnett proposed creating the role of assistant director to Festival Casals Inc., with Roselín Pabón (who also became director of the Conservatory of Music's own symphonic orquesta) being chosen.

Campos Parsi became affiliated with the Carlos Romero Barceló administration and collaborated in a series of cultural reforms that took place in 1980, raising controversy in the process. In April 1981, SOPR was assigned to perform at the inauguration of the Luis A. Ferré Performing Arts Center at Santurce. Working in a politically charged environment that led to protests against the Romero Barceló administration, the orquesta's performance underwhelmed. Writing for The San Juan Star Francis Schwartz wrote that "the program [was] a typical opera sancocho (stew) designed to satisfy the Pro Arte proclivities" and argued that no "serious director would put together such a program [...] unless there was pressure from the board". His colleague Donald Thompson called it "both ordinary and forgettable" and called it "a Thursday night stew" while arguing that such a "grand occasion" deserved better.

After completing his doctorate in 1983, Orlando Cora would serve as director of the Sinfónica. He led pieces such as Cantata for the magic America and Symphony No. 1 in mi minor. Obed Tirado Tolentino was involved in changes meant to make the PRSO "more Puerto Rican", both in composition and in its approach to music. In 1990, Tirado was assigned administrator of the orchestra. As the Conservatory of Music neared its 40th anniversary, dozens of graduates from its Crash String Program began joining the PRSO. Jesús Morales won the audition to become maestro of the Orquesta.

The PRSO is currently managed by the Musical Arts Corporation of the government of Puerto Rico, who also organizes the annual Casals Festival. The PRSO regularly performs at the Luis A. Ferré Performing Arts Center.

In 2017, the orchestra was featured on "Yo Contra Ti" by Puerto Rican rapper Daddy Yankee, recorded for a breast cancer campaign in partnership with foundations Susan G. Komen Puerto Rico and J. Walter Thompson. Puerto Rican producer Echo produced, mixed and recorded the song, while Puerto Rican Grammy Award-winner musician Ángel "Cucco" Peña served as musical director. The song garnered the PRSO a nomination for a Latin Grammy Award for Best Urban Fusion/Performance at the 19th Latin Grammy Awards.

From August through May, the orchestra has weekly concerts at the Pablo Casals Symphony Hall.

Current music director is Maximiano Valdés.

== Accolades ==
Latin Grammy Awards

Year	Work	Category	Result	Ref.
2018	"Yo Contra Ti" (Daddy Yankee featuring Puerto Rico Symphony Orchestra)	Best Urban Fusion/Performance	Nominated	

== See also ==
- Orchestra
- List of symphony orchestras in the United States
- Classical music
- Music of Puerto Rico
