= Kamilya Jubran =

Palestanian singer

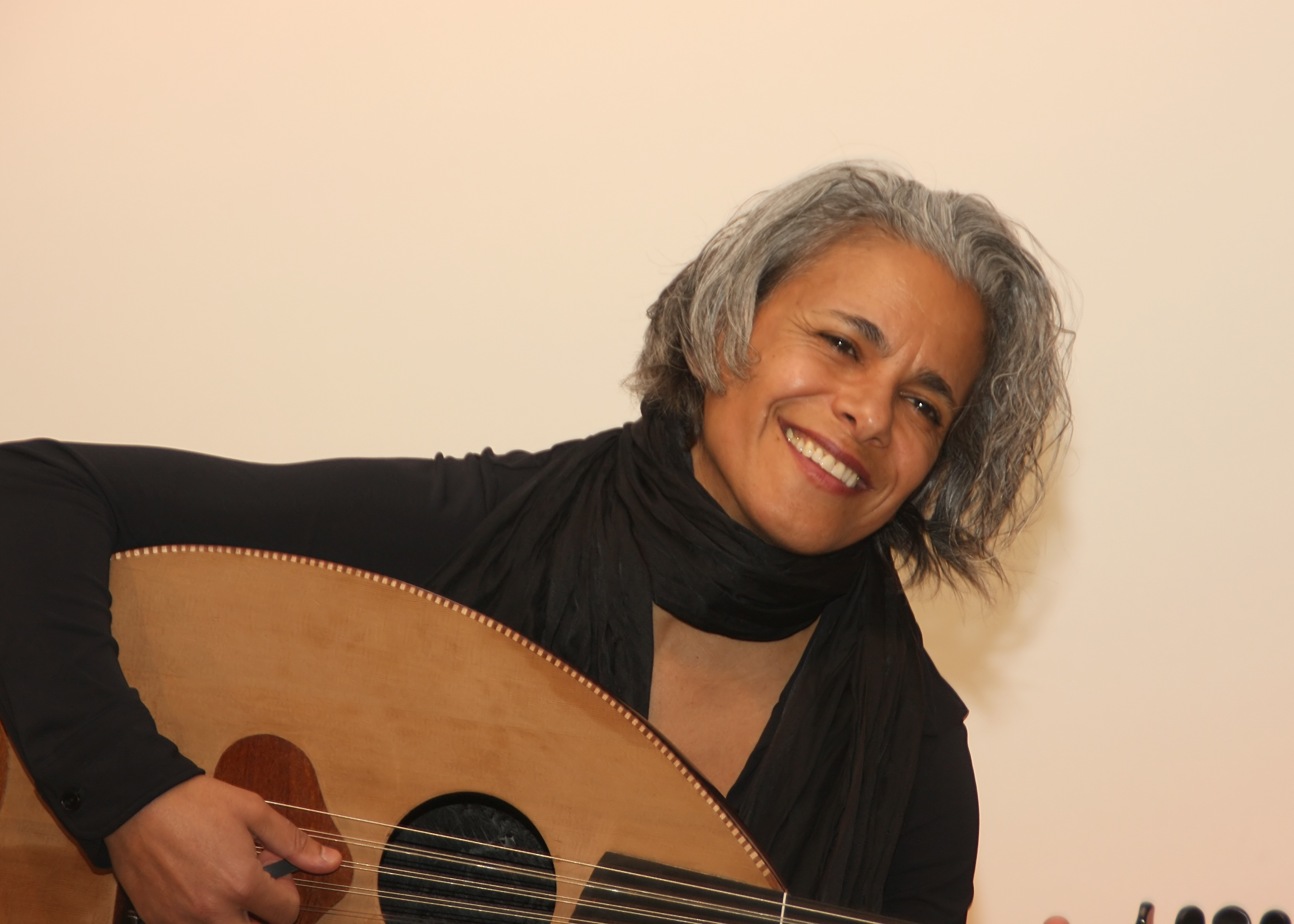
Kamilya Jubran in Cologne in 2009

Kamilya Jubran (Arabic: كميليا جبران; born 1962) is a Palestinian singer, songwriter, and musician.

== Early life ==
Kamilya Jubran was born in Rameh in 1962 to Palestinian Israeli parents. Her father Elias is a music teacher and maker of traditional Palestinian instruments such as the oud. Her brother Khaled is also a musician. Jubran and her family were featured in Telling Strings (2007), a documentary about generational differences and cultural identity in Palestine.

She moved to Jerusalem in 1981 to study social work at the Paul Baerwald School of Social Work and Social Welfare at the Hebrew University of Jerusalem. It was there that Jubran discovered her identity, history and heritage. After being introduced to Said Murad, the founder of musical group Sabreen (patient ones), Jubran joined the group in 1982 (two years after its foundation) and became the only Israeli Arab member who had been born in Israel. In 2002, she moved to Europe.

She has described herself as "deeply atheist".

== Career ==
Jubran plays the oud and qanun, among other instruments. From 1982–2002, she was the lead singer of Sabreen, an Arabic musical group based in occupied East Jerusalem. Since 2002, she has toured solo and collaborated with a range of European musicians. In 2013, she was featured alongside Tom Morello and Julian Assange as a guest artist on Calle 13's single "Multi Viral".

== Discography ==
=== With Sabreen ===
- Dukhan al-Barakin (1984)
- Mawt al-Nabi (1988)
- Jayy al-Hamam (1994)
- Ala Fein (2000)

=== Solo ===
- Wameedd (2006)
- Wanabni (2010)
- Makan (2009)
- Nhaoul' (2013)
