= Joseph Cotton (singer) =

Jamaican singer (born 1957)

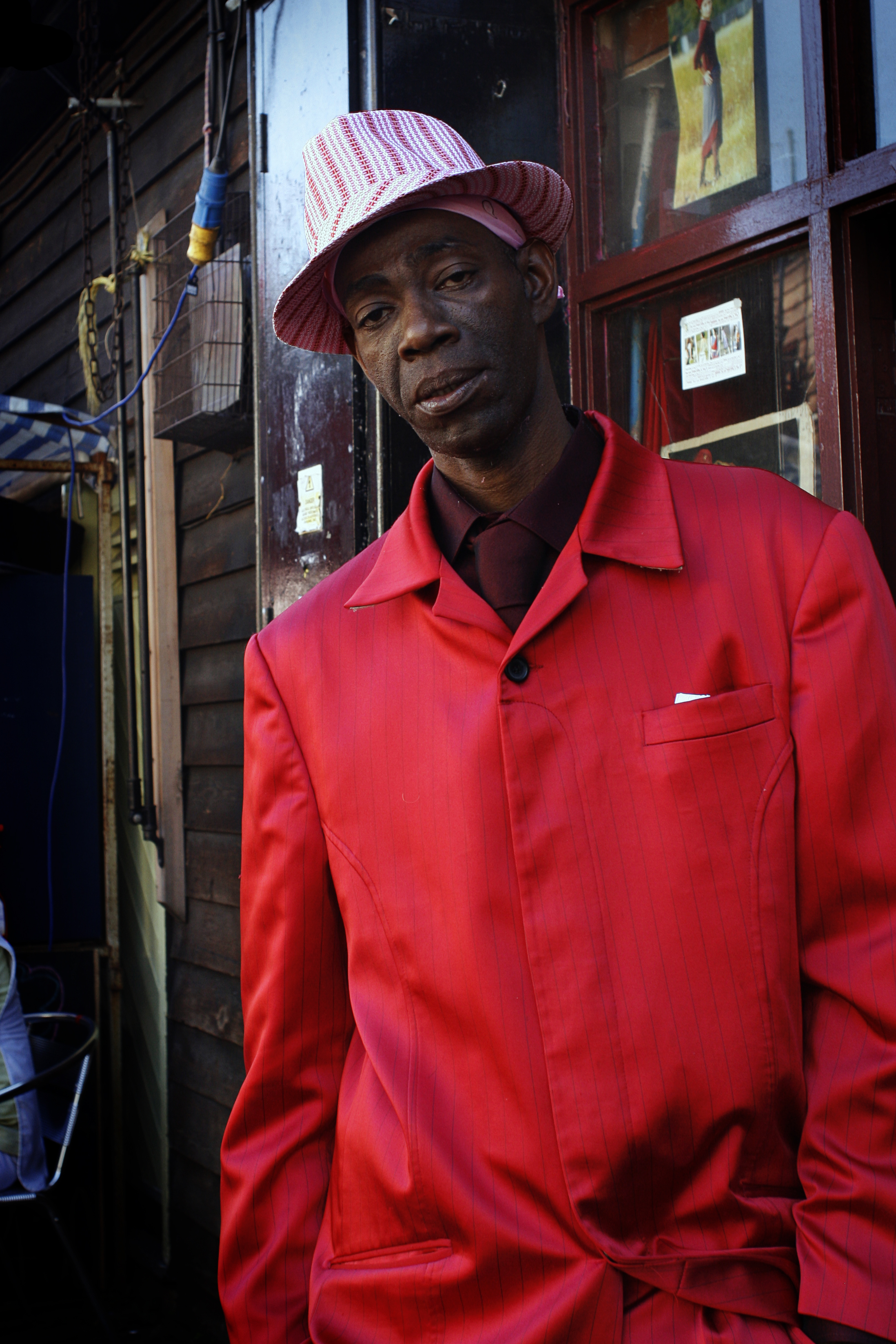

Background information
- Also known as: Jah Walton, Budu-budu
- Born: Silbert Aston Walton; 1957 (age 68–69); St. Ann, Jamaica
- Genres: Reggae
- Instrument: Vocals
- Years active: 1976–present
- Labels: Joe Gibbs, VP, Teem, P.O.T

Joseph Cotton a.k.a. Jah Walton (born Silbert Aston Walton, 1957, St. Ann, Jamaica) is a reggae singer active since the mid-1970s.

== Biography ==
After spending a year working in the Jamaican police force, Walton turned to recording, initially working with Joe Gibbs in 1976, under the name Jah Walton. He then moved to Harry Mudie, recording popular tracks such as "Stay a Yard and Praise God", "Touch Her Where She Want It Most" (the title track from his debut album), and "Married to a Bank Cashier". In the mid-1980s, he began recording under the name Joseph Cotton, immediately having success in the United Kingdom with "No Touch the Style", leading to a television appearance on Channel 4's Club Mix programme in 1987. Several more reggae chart hits followed in the form of "Things Running Slow", "Pat Ha Fe Cook", "Tutoring", "Judge Cotton", and "What Is This". Cotton continued to perform and record into the 1990s, 2000s and the present day. He now lives in France where he performs at venues throughout the country and elsewhere in Europe both solo and in collaboration with other reggae artists.

== Albums ==
- Touch Her Where She Want It Most (1981) Music Force
- Talk of the Town (1984) Thunder Bolt
- Cotton Style (1990) South East – credited to Joseph Cotton and the Lord Son (Glen Brown)
- No Touch the Style (1987) Blue Mountain/VP
- Dancehall Days (1998) Moll Selekta (compilation)
- The Good Old Days of the 70s (1998) Teem (Joseph Cotton & Mike Brooks)
- Things You Should Know (1999)
- Kingston a Run Red (2002) China Visit
- Black & White Ting (200?) P.O.T.
- 100% Pure Cotton (2005) P.O.T.
- Worldpeace (2005) P.O.T.
- Unity Amongst the Youths (2006) Jet Star
- Showcase (200?)
- Joseph Cotton Meets Lion Stepper (2009)
- True Life (2013) Disco-Box Music
- Nightlife (2014) Atili Bandelero Records
