= Ariel Rivas =

- Also known as: Ariel Rivas
- Born: Carlos Ariel Rivas Villamán
- Origin: Dominican Republic
- Genres: Urbano, salsa, Latin pop
- Occupations: Record producer, artist manager, recording engineer, music promoter
- Years active: 1993–present
- Label: Ariel Rivas Music
- Website: www.arielrivas.com

Ariel Rivas is a Dominican Grammy winner, music producer, artist manager, recording engineer, and producer of shows, events, and international tours.

== Biography ==
Before he committed to music, Rivas studied architecture at the Veritas University in Costa Rica as well as at the "Universidad Iberoamericana (UNIBE)" in the Dominican Republic. He earned a degree in Artist Management from Berklee College of Music in Boston, Massachusetts. While working on a master's degree in Music Business at Berklee, he received the Bill Cosby Scholarship for academic excellence.

Rivas has been in the music industry since age 15. He is the owner of Ariel Rivas Entertainment, a company dedicated to event production, management and promotion. The company works with recognized artists such as Rubén Blades, Don Omar, Wisin y Yandel, Gilberto Santa Rosa, Danny Rivera, Tego Calderón, Jerry Rivera, Victor Manuelle, Luis Fonsi, and Luis Enrique.

Since 1999 he has managed the successful artistic career of Danny Rivera, a well-known Puerto Rican singer whose albums have gone gold and platinum, selling more than 20 million copies during his career. Rivas has emphasized his skills as a music producer and recording engineer in some of Rivera’s albums, including “Enamorado de la Paz”, “Quiere Nacer”, “Amada Amante”, “Te Regalo una Rosa” tribute to Juan Luis Guerra, and “Mi Tierra me Llama”.

== Philanthropy ==
On June 19, 2004 Rivas organized the charity event "A Song of Hope" to benefit the flood victims of Jimaní in the Dominican Republic. Participants included Luis Fonsi, Chichi Peralta, Danny Rivera, Milly Quezada, Fernando Villalona, Pavel Núñez, Adalgisa Pantaleón, City of Angels, and Frank Ceara. He also established several fundraising events to provide scholarships to poor children in the Dominican Republic and Costa Rica.

== Featured events ==
On April 3, 2011, Ariel Rivas produced a show to celebrate the inauguration of Costa Rica’s new National Stadium with the participation of Latin singers such as Gilberto Santa Rosa, Don Omar and Víctor Manuelle.

In October 2011 he was hired by the government of Panama as general and executive producer of the opening and closing ceremonies for the 2011 Baseball World Cup at the Rod Carew Stadium in Panama. He created a major light show with special effects, videos, choreography and fireworks.

In 2009 Rivas teamed up with Juan Toro and The Relentless Agency to produce Ruben Blades and Seis del Solar’s world tour "Todos Vuelven". During the same year he carried out the production of "Todos Vuelven Live", including two compact discs and two DVDs documenting the tour through Latin America and the United States. For this project Rivas received two Latin Grammy nominations for Best Producer and Video Director (long version) and best Salsa Album in the Tropical category. In 2011 he was awarded the Latin Grammy for the production of Best Salsa Album.

== Recognition ==
- 2011 Received “Bill Cosby” scholarship at Berklee College of Music for academic excellence.
- 2011 Latin Grammy Award Winner for Best Salsa Album, “Todos Vuelven Live”, Ruben Blades y Seis del Solar.
- 2011 Latin Grammy Nomination for Best Producer and Director for Long Form Music Video, "Todos Vuelven," Ruben Blades y Seis del Solar.
- 2012 Latin Grammy Nomination for Best Salsa Album, "Eba Say Ajá", Ruben Blades and Cheo Feliciano.
- Medal of Recognition by the Fenton Foundation, for his contribution in the production of events to encourage education for the Dominican children and youth.

== Production credits ==
- 2012 World Tour Ruben Blades “Cantos y Cuentos Urbanos” (General and Executive Producer, Booking Agent)
- Opening and Closing of Panama’s 2011 Baseball World Cup (General and Executive Producer)
- World Tour Ruben Blades and Seis del Solar “Todos Vuelven” (General and Executive Producer)
- "Una sola Salsa" Tour Ruben Blades and Gilberto Santa Rosa (General Producer)
- 2011 Ruben Blades Europe Tour (General Producer)
- "La Historia Continua" Tour, Gilberto Santa Rosa and Victor Manuelle (General Producer and Creative Director)
- "A Song of Hope", charity event to benefit the flood victims of Jimani in the Dominican Republic with the participation of Luis Fonsi, Chichi Peralta Danny Rivera, Milly Quezada, Fernando Villalona, Pavel Núñez, Adalgisa Pantaleon, City of Angels, Frank Ceara, among others. (General Producer)
