= Multi Viral =

Multi_Viral

Studio album by Calle 13
- Released: March 1, 2014
- Recorded: Música Satánica Studios, San Juan
- Genres: Latin; alternative hip hop; urban
- Language: Spanish
- Label: El Abismo
- Producer: Visitante

Calle 13 chronology
Entren Los Que Quieran (2010)	''Multi_Viral'' (2014)

Singles from Multi_Viral
- 1. "Multi_Viral" Released: November 13, 2013; 2. "El Aguante" Released: February 18, 2014

Multi_Viral is the fifth and final studio album from Puerto Rican band Calle 13, released on March 1, 2014. It marks the band's debut release via their new independent label, El Abismo, since they parted ways with Sony Music Latin. The album won Best Urban Music Album at the 15th Annual Latin Grammy Awards and Best Latin Rock or Alternative Album at 57th Annual Grammy Awards.

== Recording and release ==
The album was mixed at Electric Lady Studios, in Greenwich Village, New York City.

During the recording of the album in San Juan, Visitante saw the light bulbs in the studio burning out one by one as the months passed. He promised not to replace any of them until the album was finished. The last lamp burned one week before the album was ready, and Visitante said he would continue to work in the dark.

The album was released on March 1, 2014, coinciding with the band's debut performance of their South American tour at the Estadio Arquitecto Ricardo Etcheverry in Buenos Aires, Argentina. Every attendee of the tour received a digital download card for the album. This is part of the "multiviral" concept of the album, as the band's composer and instrumentalist Visitante explains:

They will be going out of the concert with this album, and then all of the songs will be in their computers, and definitely they are going to upload the songs to I don't know where. So the multiviral concept is going to be real.

Vocalist and lyricist Residente added that the album will be promoted not by traditional advertising but by word of mouth, virally.

On February 27, NPR Music made the entire album available for listening via streaming.

== Music and lyrics ==
Residente has described the lyrics of the album as "more existential" and went on to say: "Suddenly, I've started to be more aware, or worried, about living and dying. I thought, maybe I can do something bigger than politics".

The album opening track was described by Jon Pareles as "an elegant chamber-pop setting, with hints of Beatles harmony". It will feature spoken words by Uruguayan writer Eduardo Galeano.

The track "Adentro" criticizes gangsta rappers and their lyrics, considered aggressive by Residente but also shows Residente apologizing for insulting Luis Fortuño, then governor of Puerto Rico, during a 2009 speech. Working further on self-criticism, Residente mentions a Maserati he bought during Calle 13 first successful years, something he later regretted. So much that the video for the song features Residente smashing the car, not before the "gangsta-influenced Puerto Rican youth" throw their guns and gold through its open windows onto the seats. Residente destroyed the car using a baseball bat provided by Willie Mays, a hero to Residente. Commenting on the idea of the song and the video, Residente said:

I used that car for four months, and by the end I was ashamed of myself. That car, in a way, is part of all that stuff: the guns, the gold. So I'm going to destroy it on video with all these guns inside.

When Visitante studied the concept of the song, he tried not to use typical hip hop rhythms and loops. A set of Grammy Awards trophies was used for percussion at some parts of the song.

=== Singles ===
==== Multi_Viral ====
The title-track and first single features additional vocals from Palestinian singer Kamilya Jubran; spoken words by Australian journalist Julian Assange (founder of WikiLeaks), which were recorded at the Embassy of Ecuador in London, during his time under diplomatic asylum granted by the Ecuadorian government; and American guitarist Tom Morello, of Rage Against the Machine fame.

The song covers the topic of media manipulation and disinformation while referencing to protests such as Occupy Wall Street and Yo Soy 132. Regarding the song, the band's singer and lyricist Residente said: "Media are controlling everything, even people's minds, everything. Here in the U.S. it's worse, it's like a bubble ... It's important to have the right information, and you are not going to get that from one newspaper or one TV show. You have to look for that. In order to get the full picture, you have to read a lot and look for yourself. Otherwise you'll find yourself in a war that you think is a good idea, but it's not for a good reason."

Morello declared he was convinced to work on the song when he knew Julian Assange would take part of it. He described Calle 13 as "comrades in arms at the barricades. One of the hallmarks of their career is weaving their convictions into their kick-ass music, and that's something I've endeavored to do in my career as well."

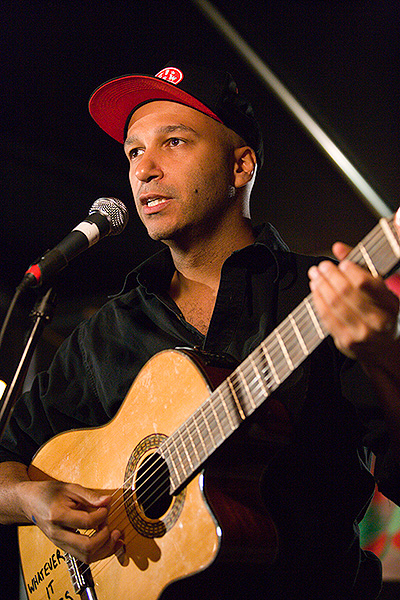
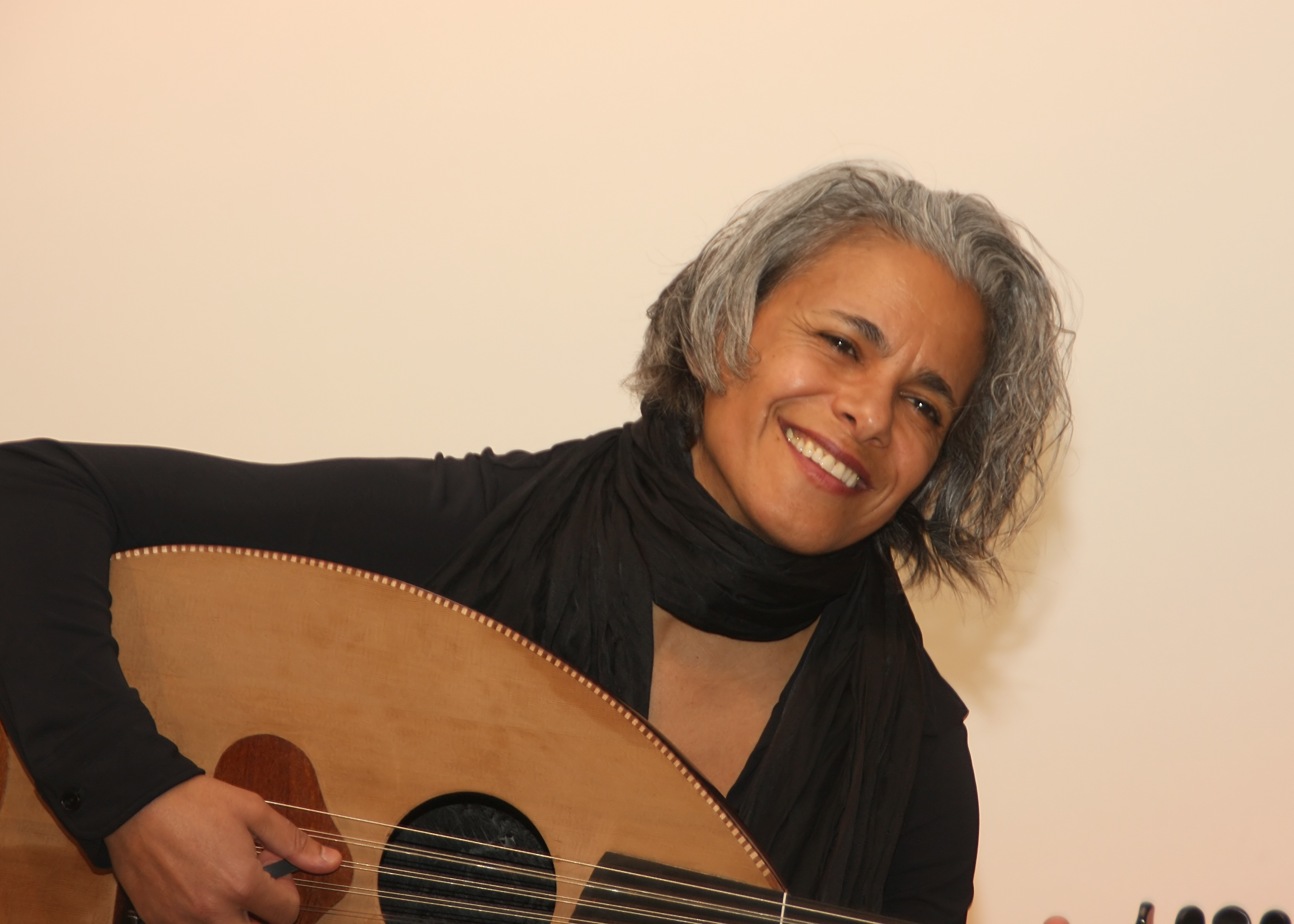
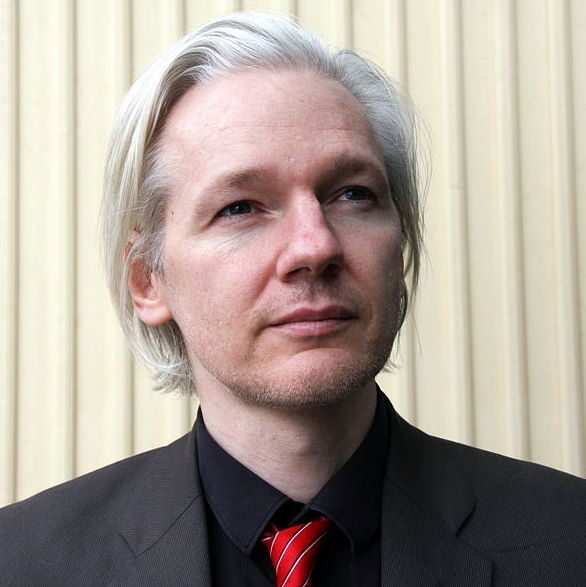
Tom Morello (left), Kamilya Jubran (center) and Julian Assange (right) guest performed on the song

The music video for "Multi_Viral" was directed by Kacho López, produced by Zapatero Filmes and shot in Bethlehem and Beit Sahour, both in Palestine. It shows a young boy using rifle parts to create a custom guitar. Amnesty International Venezuela expressed support for the video and thanked Calle 13 for their "efforts to fight violence".

Chart (2013)	Peak position
US Latin Digital Songs (Billboard)	39

==== El Aguante ====
The second single, "El Aguante", features a "brisk Irish-flavored flute melody". It is influenced by Ireland's resistance to assimilation and mentions several other historical conflicts, wars and dictatorships. The chorus of the song was sung by Residente and a group of people. Some sections of the song have percussive sounds that were produced by Residente, Visitante and a third man hitting bottles on a wooden plate with several metallic objects on it.

==== Ojos Color Sol ====
The track "Ojos Color Sol", which is the third single, is a collaboration with Cuban songwriter Silvio Rodríguez, an influence of Residente's. The song expresses the idea that the sunlight would not be missed because the look of a woman is as bright as the star's light.

==== Respira el momento ====
"Respira el momento" (The original name was "La vida" but as Residente said "They were a lot of songs just coming out with that name so we changed it") talks about the cycle of a human life. The chorus is built on a Native American chant. They invited Native American singer Vernon Foster, whom they discovered on YouTube, but he was in Romania at the time. They had him fly to San Juan anyway. Visitante said the song reflected the way he felt during the preparing of the album, saying it was the first song to be thought of and the last to be finished. Residente said it was difficult to write a song that summarized life, and that he did some research on data such as how many people are born and die every day, month and year; how much one walks during a lifetime, etc. A string quartet guest appeared on this track. The song's tempo was intended to match that of a baby's heartbeat.

== Reception and accolades ==
Professional ratings
Review scores
Source	Rating
AllMusic	5/5 stars
Rolling Stone	4/5 stars

Will Hermes of Rolling Stone said the band "have made as ambitious a hip-hop album – if that's not too narrow a term – as any in any language", and considered the title track, as well as the whole album, "an object lesson in just that." David Jeffries from AllMusic said the album kept the "political commentary" and "genre-jumping" while showing a "sense of earned artistic freedom". He also commented that "it's amazing the album doesn't fall apart because of weight, or come off like a dry civics class".

Multi_Viral and its songs received ten nominations for the Latin Grammy Awards of 2014 - the same number of their previous studio release, Entren Los Que Quieran. The album itself was nominated for Album of the Year and Best Urban Music Album. The third single "Adentro" was nominated for three categories: Best Urban Performance, Best Urban Song (to which "Cuando los pies besan el piso" was also nominated) and Best Short Form Music Video. The second single ("El Aguante") and the fourth single ("Ojos Color de Sol") were also nominated for Best Alternative Song and Song of the Year, respectively, and "Respira el Momento" was nominated for Record of the Year. The band's producer and instrumentalist Visitante was nominated for Producer of the Year, not only for his work on this album, but also for producing Jorge Drexler's "Todo Cae".

In 2015, the album won the Grammy Award for Best Latin Rock, Urban or Alternative Album. Also in 2015, the videos for the tracks "Así de grande son las ideas" and "Ojos color de sol" were nominated for the 16th Latin Grammy Awards in the Best Short Form Music Video category.

== Track listing ==
All lyrics are written by Residente; all music is composed by Visitante.

No.	Title	Length
1.	"Intro - El viaje" (The Journey) (featuring Eduardo Galeano)	2:00
2.	"Respira el momento" (Breathe in the Moment) (featuring Vernon Foster)	5:29
3.	"Interludio - Un buen día para morir" (Interlude - A Good Day to Die) (featuring Vernon Foster)	0:40
4.	"El aguante" (Endurance)	4:48
5.	"Ojos color sol" (Sun-Colored Eyes) (featuring Silvio Rodríguez)	3:37
6.	"Multi_Viral" (featuring Julian Assange, Kamilya Jubran, and Tom Morello)	4:23
7.	"Cuando los pies besan el piso" (When the Feet Kiss the Floor)	3:54
8.	"Adentro" (Inside)	4:53
9.	"Interludio - Stupid Is as Stupid Does" (Interlude - Stupid Is as Stupid Does) (featuring John Leguizamo)	0:59
10.	"Los idiotas" (The Idiots)	4:30
11.	"Fuera de la atmósfera del cráneo" (Out of the Skull's Atmosphere)	3:55
12.	"Perseguidos" (Pursued (featuring Biga Ranx)	4:45
13.	"Gato que avanza, perro que ladra" (Cat That Advances, Dog That Barks)	5:08
14.	"Me vieron cruzar" (They Saw Me Crossing)	3:54
15.	"Así de grande son las ideas" (Ideas Are That Big)	5:11
Total length:		58:12

== Charts ==
=== Weekly charts ===
Chart (2014)	Peak position
Mexican Albums (Top 100 Mexico)	8
Peruan Albums(Phantom Music Store)	2
Spanish Albums (Promusicae)	50
Uruguayan Albums (CUD)	5
US Top Latin Albums (Billboard)	4
US Top Rap Albums (Billboard)	23
Venezuelan Albums (Recordland)	12

=== Year-end charts ===
Chart (2014)	Position
US Top Latin Albums	51

== Certifications ==
Region	Certification	Certified units/sales
Mexico (AMPROFON)	Platinum	60,000^{‡}
^{‡} Sales+streaming figures based on certification alone.
