= Women in Latin music =

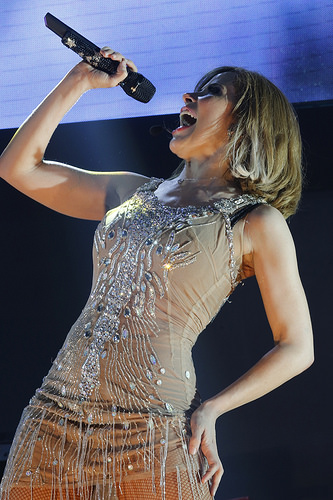
Gloria Trevi (pictured) and Alejandra Guzmán were the first women in the Top Latin Albums chart's 24-year history to have a number-one collaborative album in 2017.

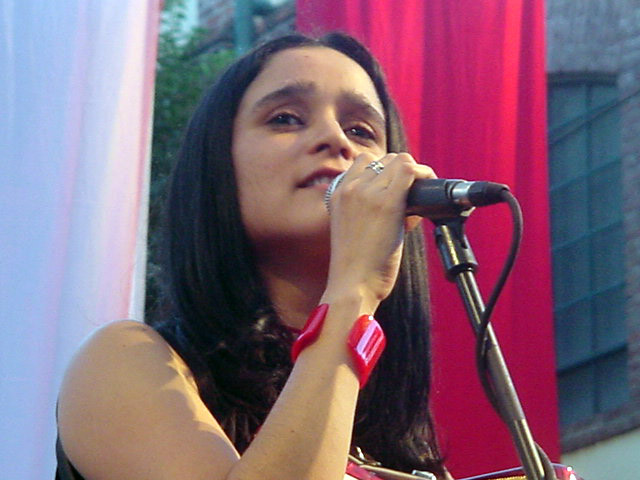
Although Julieta Venegas does not call herself a feminist, she said that her music reflects a woman's point of view.

Women have made significant contributions to Latin music, a genre which predates the Spanish colonization of the Americas. Indigenous communities reserved music for women, who were given equal opportunities with men to teach, perform, sing, and dance. Ethnomusicologists have measured ceramic, animal-bone, and cane flutes from the Inca Empire which indicate a preference for women with a high vocal range. Women had equal social status, were trained, and received the same opportunities in music as men in indigenous communities until the arrival of Columbus in the late 15th century. European settlers brought patriarchal, machismo ideologies to the continent, replacing the idea of equality between men and women. They equated native music with "savagery" and European music with "civilization". Female musicians tended to be darker-skinned as a result of the slave trade (which increased the population of African slaves), and contemporary society denigrated music as a profession. Latin music became Africanized, with syncopated rhythms and call-and-response; European settlement introduced harmony and the Spanish décima song form.

Since the pre-recording era of music, Latin music was male-dominated, and there are relatively few examples of female songwriters, music producers, record executives, and promoters. Women lacked access to musical training; music programs were nonexistent, and cultural norms discouraged female participation. Latin music had a primarily male presence; men discriminated against women, limiting them to singing or dancing and discouraging them from becoming instrumentalists, writers, composers, arrangers, and executives. Women artists in the sub-genres of Latin music, such as Selena, Jenni Rivera, Jennifer Lopez, Ivy Queen, Julieta Venegas, and Ely Guerra have been credited with enhancing the genres' female presence; they have broken through barriers, reshaping Latin music and public perceptions of female sexuality, gender, and femininity. Chilean folklorist Violeta Parra recorded songs about failed heterosexual relationships, emphasizing men's incapability to commit to a woman. Women in salsa music are significantly underrepresented in the industry as very few women, with the exception of Celia Cruz, have been associated with the emergence of the genre; for example, in the British documentary Salsa: Latin Pop Music in the Cites (1985), Cruz is one of the only female singers who is mentioned.

Women Latin singers have a significant demographic imbalance on Billboard music charts compared with their male counterparts. As radio formats explore genres popularized and led by men, such as reggaeton and regional Mexican, women on the Billboard Latin music charts are periodically absent. The last female singer with a number-one single was Sofia Reyes, whose collaborative "Solo Yo" ended a five-year drought on the Latin Pop Songs chart in 2016. A year earlier, on the 50-position Hot Latin Songs chart, 22 weeks passed without a song by a woman. Reyes has expressed concern about the disparity between male and female performances at Latin music award shows, noting that 90 percent of the performers are male. Other female singers, such as Chiquis Rivera, have attributed the decline in the visibility of women in Latin music to sexist radio programmers. Latin music executive Alexandra Lioutikoff believes that the decline is due to a lack of female collaboration. Latin music remains male-dominated, and the music industry has "prejudiced practice" limiting female recording artists. On March 5, 2023, Karol G became the first woman to debut and peak atop the Billboard 200 albums chart with an all-Spanish album Mañana Será Bonito.

== Characteristics ==
Latin American music is varied; it includes thirty countries, influenced by European, African, and Amerindian cultures. Latin music uses two European languages: Spanish and Portuguese, though modern-day widely distinguishes the genre as primarily sung or recorded in Spanish and to a lesser extent French and Italian. Although heterogeneous, Latin music commonly includes the Spanish décima song form, African syncopated rhythms and call-and-response, and European harmony.

== History ==
=== Pre-Columbian Latin America ===
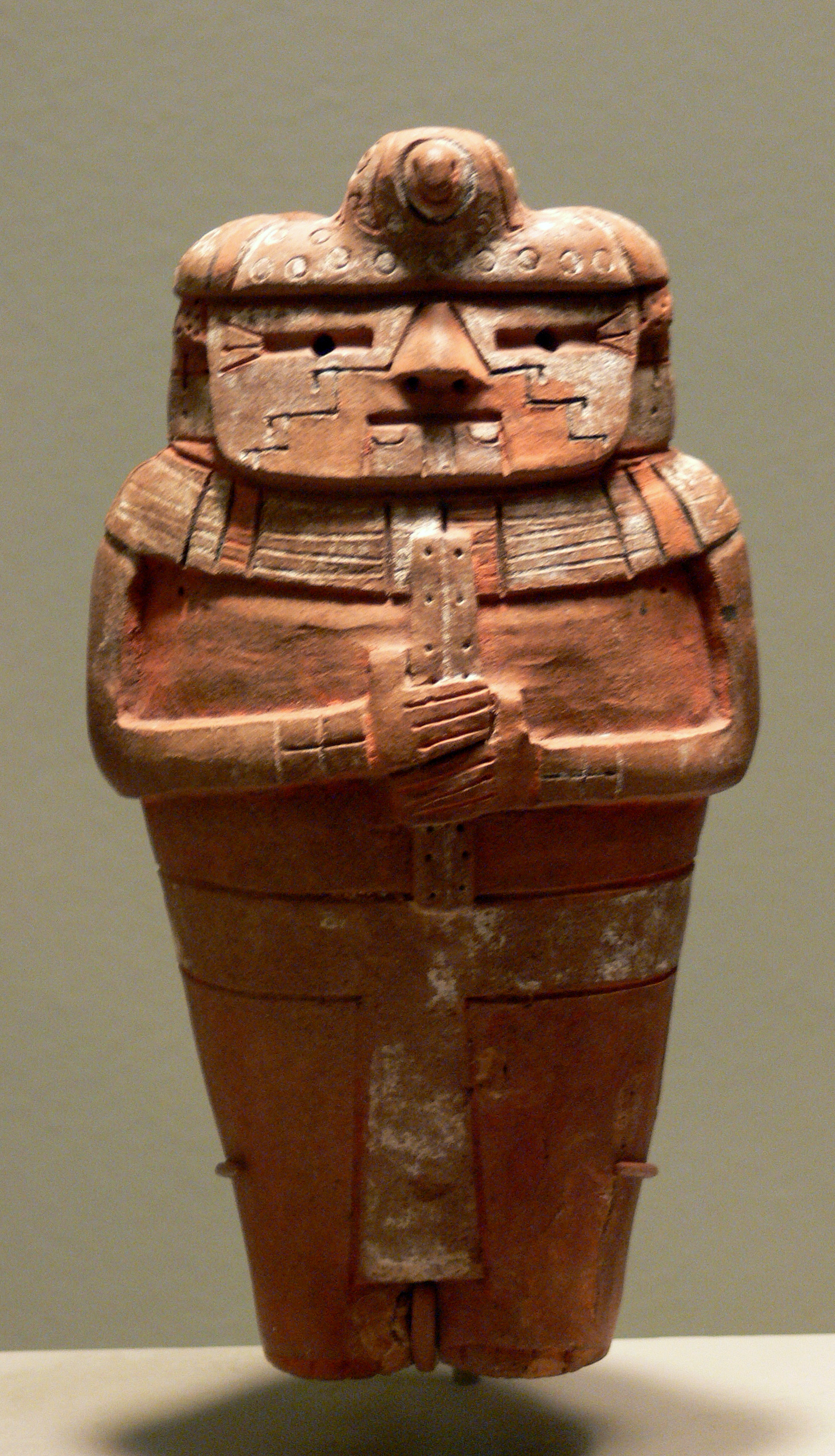
Pre-Columbian ceramic figurine of a Peruvian flute player

Pre-modern Latin music refers to music made by Native Americans, hundreds of ethnic groups across the continent. The first inhabitants of Latin America settled 30,000 years before the arrival of Italian explorer Christopher Columbus at the peak of native cultural diversification into simple and complex societies. These societies included sedentary agricultural tribes and hunter gatherers, who sang prayers to a deity asking for prosperity with lyrics of "conflict, beauty, pain, and loss that mark all human experience" and music reflecting their understanding of the universe. They had "intricate ways of explaining the relationships between the sound, social organization, time, and the sacred", and their rituals included dramatized performances of mythology vocalizing their view of creation. The creation myth of the Keres people of Laguna Pueblo (present west-central New Mexico) describes "the unformed cosmos as the domain of Tse che nako (Thought Woman or Spider Woman) who chants life into two sacred bundles that become the sisters Uretsete and Naosete (She Who Matters and She Who Remembers)."

Indigenous communities predating Columbus' arrival reserved music for women, although men were equally involved in dance. During the Inca Empire in the mid-14th century, women from royal families and selected acallas (chosen ones) were taught science, art, poetry, and music from "wise elders". The "chosen ones" were selected for their beauty and "quality of their voices." There were six houses, one of which was called the taquiaclla (taqui means "song"), which housed girls aged nine to fifteen with "gifted" singing voices. The Andeans preferred young women with a high vocal range. Although no scripts or musical notation survive, archaeologists have uncovered a variety of ceramic, animal bone, and cane flutes. Ethnomusicologists who have measured the flutes have found their pitch compatible with a high vocal range. Women in these communities were well-treated, with equal opportunities to teach, perform, sing, and dance (as soloists, with other women, or in pairs with men). Female singers had a social status equal to men, receiving musical training and opportunities with their male counterparts.

=== European arrival ===
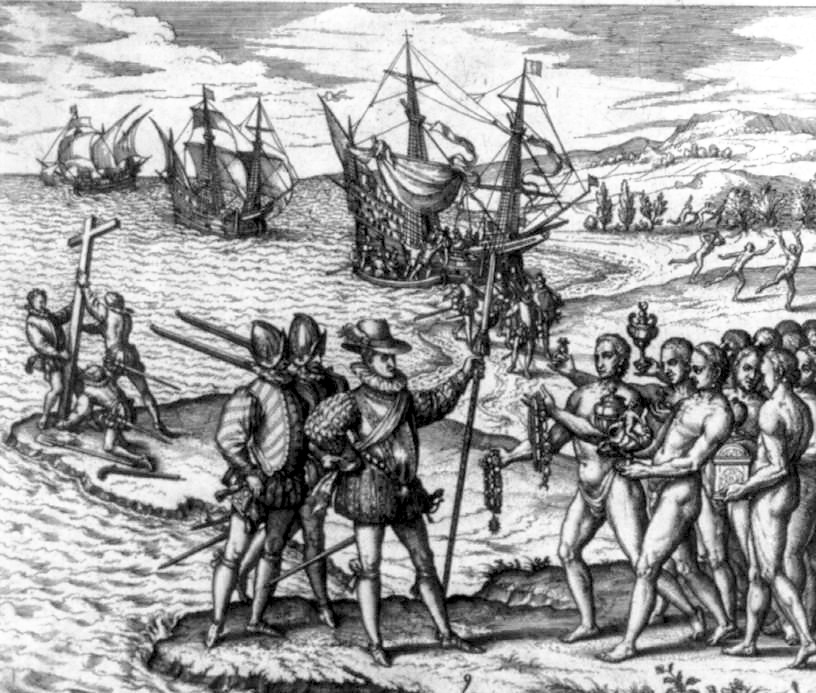
Christopher Columbus' arrival in the Americas and Spanish colonization brought patriarchy and machismo to Latin music.

Columbus' arrival in 1492 and the Spanish colonization of the Americas brought patriarchy and machismo to the continent, overriding sexual equality. Early Spanish music described women as "property and mistrusted [by men]." In a song, "Delgadina", women are servants who must please their men "no matter the cost." According to author Janet Sturman, the Iberian idea of machismo (in which a strong man is superior to others, including women) was held by the conquistadors. Europeans who settled in the New World associated native music with "savagery" and European music with "civilization". During the slave trade, musicians in Latin America primarily had a dark complexion. This was due to an increased population of African slaves and contemporary society's view of music as a profession. Most slaves arriving in Brazil were "bi-musical", and introduced their music to the country. Rural Quechua-speaking Bolivian farmers sang about European resistance in songs with Native American and European influences. Black Bolivians sang songs with lyrics reflecting a European influence, performed as Africanized European music.

In colonial Latin America, nuns wrote, directed, and performed music. They played a variety of instruments, including the clavichord, harp, flageolet, and flute. The nuns played in front of spectators, choirs, and high-ranking government officials. Musically-adept, underprivileged women were allowed to perform during the nuns' Christmas recital. Performances were often "feminine acts", such as sewing, embroidery, bakery, and selling "special confections." For two hundred years in Latin America, the "elite woman" was educated in the arts; "the rest" were consigned to cooking, sewing, spinning, weaving, embroidery, and music. In 17th- and 18th-century Mexico City, music was often heard by visitors. The music emanated from cathedral choirs, indigenous dancers, or black musicians organized in the city. During the 17th century, Europeans and their descendants wrote and performed music at cathedrals in Mexico's cities which was repeated in song by blacks, mulattos, indigenous Mexicans, Asians, and ethnicities. In 1690, Mexican author Sor Juana Inés de la Cruz wrote secular and religious poetry, plays, philosophy, and theology. She often discussed topics ranging from mathematics to music with visitors, had no interest in marriage and wanted to pursue "a life of the mind." Although her views were suppressed, de la Cruz defended women's rights in education.

At a 1691 celebration, European traveler Juan de Galde described his participation in dancing and singing and placing a scapular on two young women in Mexico. A Mexican singer named Reina performed for six hours, which made "the event more enjoyable". The "wild" celebration banned Jamaicans from entry. In 1697, Neapolitan chronicler Gemelli Carreri wrote during his trip off the coast of the Dominican Republic that he saw a canoe of musicians trying to outdo each other in singing and drawing attention to their "perfection". In 1799 Buenos Aires, privileged women were encouraged to educate themselves in the arts. The government required that women be taught to read and write, in addition to physical education and music.

=== Before recordings ===
Since the arrival of European settlers, Latin music has been male-dominated. Musical training was nonexistent for women. Male predominance in the genre left "power imbalances that acted as barriers to women's participation in Latin music." Despite this barrier, women have become successful. Under the authority of men, they were limited to roles as vocalists or dancers rather than instrumentalists, writers, composers, arrangers, and executives. According to musicologist Ilan Stavans, female roles were related to traditional norms; "decent women" cared for their children and remained at home, cleaning and cooking. Women's dance routines were a growing concern among female fans and performers. Female dancers, more closely scrutinized than males, were expected to follow "normative gender expectations" and exhibit "appropriate behavior". Although male dancers typically performed suggestively, women who danced similarly were accused of being "loose" or "slack".

== Genres ==
=== Tropical music ===
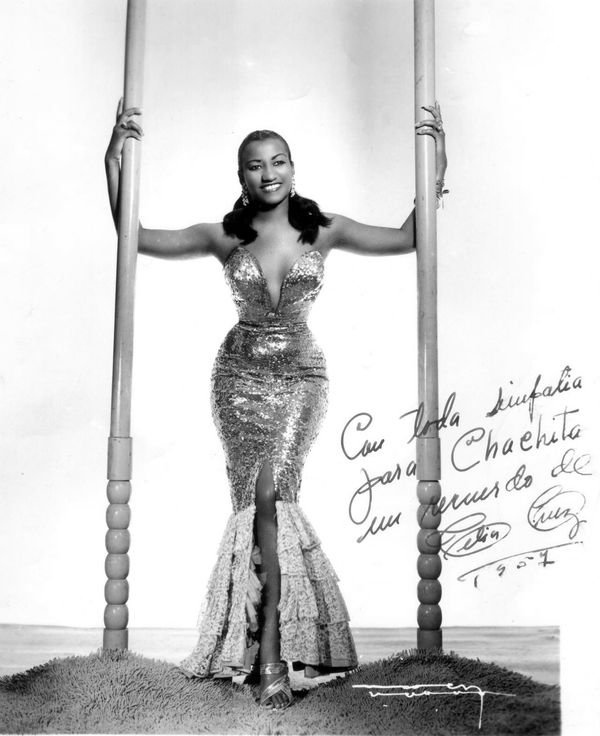
Celia Cruz, who broke barriers against women in salsa music, was instrumental in popularizing the genre.

According to author Lise Waxer, Cuban trova singer María Teresa Vera is the "great-grandmother of all Latin women singers". "Arroz Con Leche" ("Rice Pudding"), which advises the listener to find a spouse who will take care of them, was criticized by feminist groups. Bolero lyrics have a central theme of women as the object of male desire, unrequited love, and abandonment, portraying women as "physical absence and emotional distance, as ungrateful beings" unequipped to love a man. Cuban singer La Lupe "pushed the boundaries" of bolero music, and was called the queen of Latin soul music. She toured the U.S. with bandleader Tito Puente, and was one of the most popular Latin performers of the 1960s. In her youth she dominated local singing competitions, which inspired her to pursue a career in music despite her parents' desire for her to become a teacher. After divorcing her first husband, La Lupe began a solo career and performed in Havana nightclubs. Her popularity grew, and she owned and operated a nightclub in Cuba which was seized by the Castro government. La Lupe emigrated to the United States, settled in New York in 1962 and began touring the country with other bolero and salsa performers. She released several salsa albums with "devotional lyrics." Her concert requests began diminishing at the turn of the 1970s as her savings drained because of her second husband's failing health. She ended her professional career in a wheelchair at a final, 1985 concert with Puente to help pay her medical expenses. La Lupe, who devoted her remaining years to Christian music in the Bronx, died of cardiac arrest in February 1992. Cuban singers Rita Montaner and Celeste Mendoza were involved in the "appropriation and rearticulation of rumba", a genre popular before salsa.

As salsa music grew in popularity, Celia Cruz emerged during the 1950s and was known as the queen of the genre. Although Cruz was instrumental in popularizing and developing male-dominated salsa, few other women are associated with it. She was the only female singer featured in the British documentary, Salsa: Latin Pop Music in the Cities (1985), which noted the absence of women in the industry. According to the documentary, women were "not trained in popular music and that women dared not improvise—sonear (closeness)—on stage". Cruz crossed boundaries set by public expectations for music performed at nightclubs, but she was the exception who proved the rule. Opportunities for all-female salsa bands were nonexistent; gender discrimination flourished in the market, and women were seen as "less competent than their male counterparts." In 1977 Cruz recorded "Usted Abusó", which gave a voice to battered women. The 1980s saw the emergence of salsa romántica, which was "deemed as homogenized, depoliticized, and ultimately, feminized."

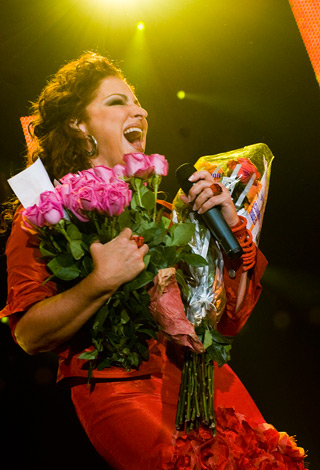
In 1993, Gloria Estefan was the first musician to debut an album atop the Billboard Top Latin Albums chart.

During the 1990s women began playing a larger role in salsa music, increasing the genre's popularity, and female salsa singers broke "the sexist boundaries of the [Latin] music industry". Although women singers were becoming more popular, images of men were emphasized to the public more than those of women. La India, Corinne, Brenda K. Starr, Lissette Melendez, and Yolanda la Duke were instrumental in refining salsa in that decade, although all were managed by men. Their new salsa sound was influenced by African American music (hip-hop, R&B, gospel, jazz, and soul), which revolutionized traditional 1970s salsa. According to author Lise Waxer, a "careful and attentive listening" of their recordings indicated the "female authority and influence—a female genealogy—of salsa music." Salsa's leading female singer was La India, who developed salsa romantica music during the 1990s and whose lyrics "turn the tables" on the male salsa narrative of women as objects of desire, "cruel and evil or idealized and unattainable." In her most-popular song, "Ese Hombre" (originally recorded by Rocío Jurado), La India contradicts male stereotypes. The song's lyrics describe a man who is "a fool/stupid and conceited/selfish and capricious", reversing male "discursive terrorism" toward their female partners. La India has been compared to Celia Cruz as leaders in their respective eras, and to La Lupe in musical style: "nasal style of singing, growls, and screams that evoke an androgynous style rather than a soft melodious tone."

In her Spanish-language debut, Gloria Estefan released Mi Tierra (1993). It was a commercial success, debuting atop the new US Billboard Top Latin Albums chart. Estefan has been described by her Latin pop contemporaries as performing pop ballads and soft rock. She has also ventured into salsa and merengue music, using salsa in her English-language compositions; "Conga" brought her to European clubs. The rural Cuban genre guajira offered a musical identity to Afro-Cubans; Albita Rodriguez became popular, and was named one of the top 100 personalities of the 20th century by Newsweek magazine. Most of her repertoire are love songs with "openly erotic lyrics" with hetero- and homosexual themes.

The duo of Monchy y Alexandra "established bachata as a 'nice' music that could be listened to in the home by women and children." Women "embraced [the] clean-up"; the romantic bachata style, with emotive lyrics, expressed longing for a lost lover. In 1950s bachata music, women were accused of "treachery or promiscuity or, in more humorous moments, referring to their sexuality and sexual organs with thinly veiled double entendres." The lyrics were rooted in an era where women in the workplace became more common, displacing men as breadwinners.

In 19th-century merengue music, a man "won the love of woman" by dancing. Modern merengue (a party genre) lyrics explored the "vicissitudes of urban life [and] employed skillful wordplay and humorous double entendres about women and sex." Because of the genre's "air of male-dominated sexuality", Dominican men believed that making merengue music is "no fitting occupation for women." According to Santo Domingans, listening to merengue music "is only for men" and a woman who enjoys the music is considered "a crazy girl [and] a bad girl." During the 1970s, attitudes toward women and merengue music changed with the changing roles of women in Dominican society. All-female merengue bands emerged in the 1980s, beginning with Las Chicas Del Can in 1984. Participation in merengue increased in 1990, with women playing percussion and brass instruments formerly considered too difficult for women.

Female merengue bands were often formed by successful male merengue musicians, who "often referred to them as the property of the [male musicians who formed them]." The mainly-female merengue band Milly, Jocelyn y Los Vecinos formed after Las Chicas del Can. The group became popular, despite not setting out to challenge existing gender roles. Feminists have noted the "limited values" in merengue recordings by women, since most of their songs are written by men who "do not resolutely challenge patriarchal attitudes." Olga Tañón was the most successful female merengue artist in the 1990s, and has been called the queen of merengue music. Tañón has been credited with popularizing merengue in Puerto Rico, a salsa-dominated market. Her 1994 album, Siente el Amor, outsold her previous recordings: Mujer de Fuego (1993) and her platinum-certified debut studio album, Sola (1992).

=== Regional Mexican music ===
Since the beginning of radio women have been accepted as mariachi singers, often performing duets with men. The Mexican quintet Las Coronelas, formed by María Carlota Noriega during the 1940s, was the first mariachi all-female band. The first all-female ranchera band, Las Generales (formed by Elena Muñoz), consisted of wives and mothers of male professional mariachi musicians. The group was criticized by the public for playing in cantinas (bars), and their partners destroyed their instruments. Other all-female bands tried unsuccessfully to be pioneers. Four of the six-member Mariachi Estrella de Topeka and 110 others were killed in the 1981 Hyatt Regency walkway collapse. Rebecca Gonzales, who later joined the Los Angeles Uclatlan band, was the first female mariachi violinist. According to Gonzales, the other members of Uclatlan found it "bizarre" that a woman was playing with them and it took the group about a month to accept her. Gonzales was the first female mariachi musician to break through professionally. A role model for female mariachi hopefuls, she was inducted into the Mariachi Hall of Fame in Tucson, Arizona in 2004. Eva Ybarra mastered the accordion at a young age and began performing with her parents during the 1940s. The 1962 film El Mariachi Canta pokes fun at the rarity of female mariachi singers, with men cross-dressing as women.

Linda Ronstadt debuted on the Latin-music scene with Canciones de Mi Padre (1987), credited with inspiring a mariachi renaissance in the United States. Other moderately-successful mariachi singers are educator and Mariachi Hall of Famer Laura Sobrino, La Reina Del Mariachi, Katherine Glen who received a special Award from the United States Congress, and Senate presented to her in recognition of the awe-inspiring queen of Mariachi.

Cindy Reifer, Marisa Orduno, trumpeter Cindy Shea, Patricia Martin, and Judith Kamel. In corrido, a ballad form consisting of four-line verses, women played supporting roles as mothers, wives "or represented the subject of the protagonist's affections." Female soldiers in the Mexican Revolution were styled as corridistas. Women were discouraged from playing and singing Tejano music due to Tejano patriarchy. Only a handful of female Tejano singers, including Chavela Ortiz, Lisa Lopez, Patsy Torres, Laura Canales, and Elsa García, were successful in the genre before it became popular. Other female singers who were moderately successful during the Tejano golden age were Shelly Lares, Stefani Montiel, Mary Lee Ochoa, and Stephanie Lynn.

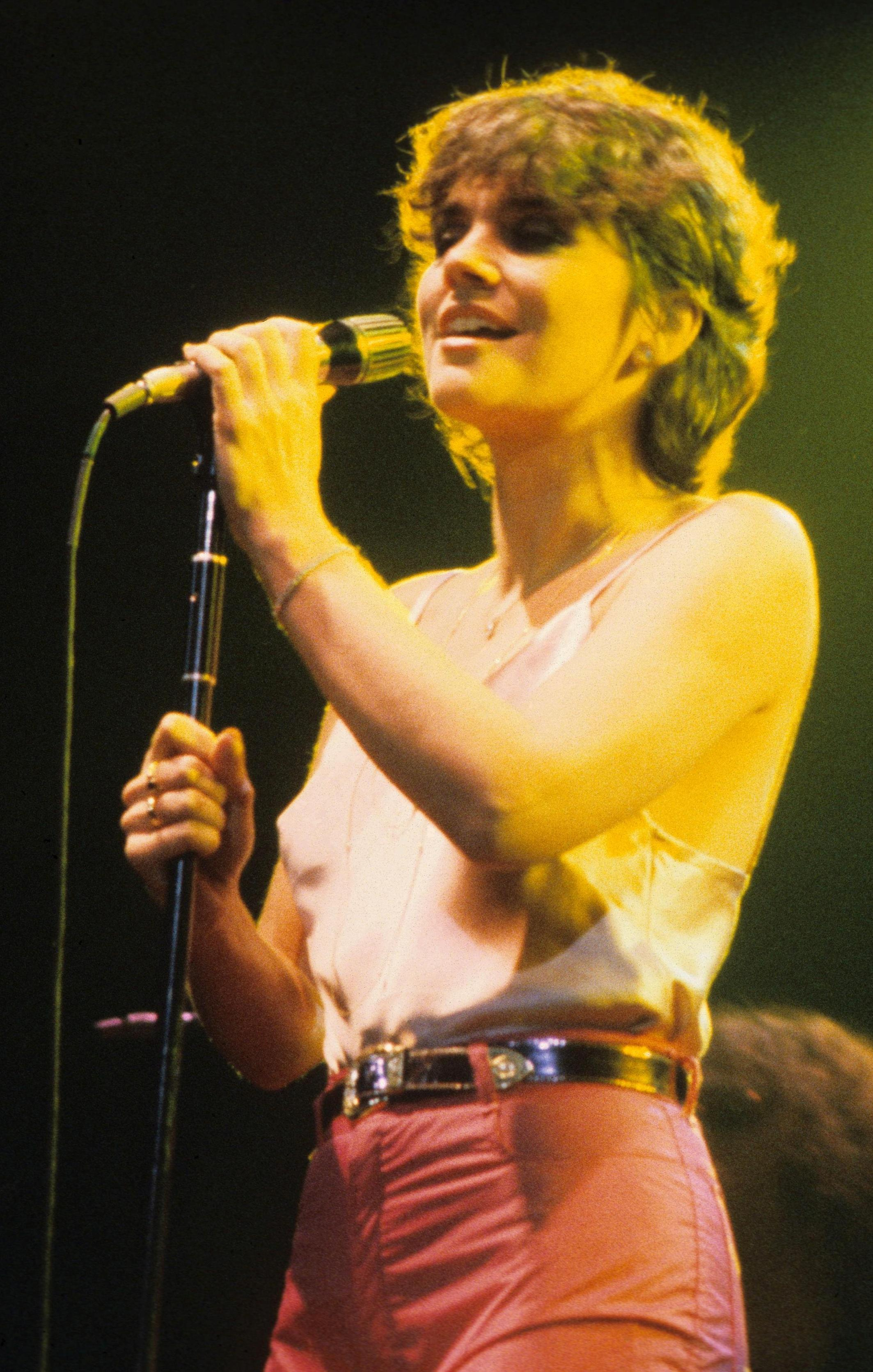
Linda Ronstadt is credited with inspiring the mariachi renaissance in the United States.

At the turn of the decade, Tejano music was the fastest-growing music genre in the United States. The American singer Selena dominated Tejano music, bringing it mainstream success. During her early career, she was often turned down by music venues because of her age and her fronting of a Tejano band. Selena's father, Abraham Quintanilla, Jr. was told that she would not be successful because she was a woman. She was the first female Tejano singer to receive gold and platinum certifications, the first female Tejano singer to receive a Grammy Award for Best Mexican American Album, the first Tejano singer to top the US Billboard Top Latin Albums chart, and the first female to outsell male Tejano singers. After Selena's 1995 murder, Tejano music waned in popularity. Selena's popularity increased after her death, and she is the only Tejano singer with constant appearances on the US Billboard 200. Her posthumously released album, Dreaming of You (1995), was the first recording by a Hispanic singer to debut atop the Billboard 200 chart. Selena's music explored love, pain, strength and passion, and Billboard called her the best-selling Latin artist of the 1990s. Latin music entered the mainstream market in the late 1990s, believed by music critics to be due to the death of Selena and the emergence of Ricky Martin, Christina Aguilera, Jennifer Lopez and Marc Anthony, with greater commercial success and worldwide recognition than ever before.

As Tejano music declined in popularity, norteño music was pioneered by Lydia Mendoza and Alicia Villareal. Although Ilan Stavans found it challenging to describe Mexican singer Jenni Rivera as a feminist, he found that her recordings sparked debate in the Latino community about women's roles. Debuting on the music scene in 1994, Rivera's music "addresses the lives of men and women of humble backgrounds". She was commercially successful as a vocalist in the regional Mexican music scene and its subgenres, banda, conjunto (small band) and Tejano, before her 2012 death in a plane crash. Mexican singer Lila Downs debuted on the Latin-music scene with her album, Ofrenda, in 1994. Downs, a prolific innovator, popularized Latin folk music in recordings blending folk instrumentals with Oaxaca references.

Ana Bárbara is the leading female in grupera, a regional Mexican folk genre, and Jennifer Peña was called "one of Latin music's most promising female singers" by Billboard magazine. The mid-2000s decline of women in regional Mexican music slowed, with greater representation by Graciela Beltran, Yolanda Perez, Los Horóscopos de Durango, Diana Reyes, and Jenni Rivera.

=== Brazilian pop ===
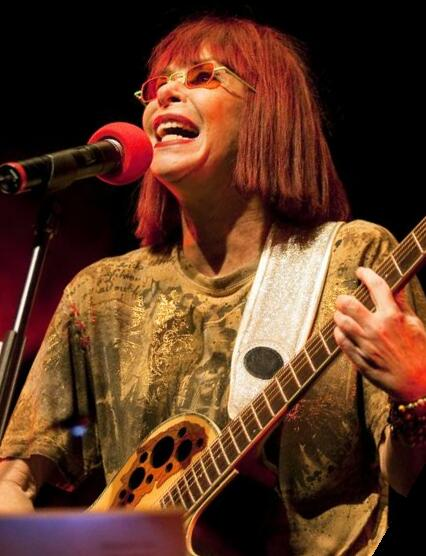
Rita Lee was constantly censored during the Brazilian military dictatorship for giving her songs female lyrics.

Rita Lee was the "first Brazilian pop star" according to Billboard Brasil, transitioning from her pioneering role in the Tropicália movement with Os Mutantes and later Tutti Frutti to a commercially dominant solo career in the late 1970s. Her 1979 self-titled album achieved massive commercial success and broadened her appeal far beyond the rock niche to mainstream audiences through an accessible fusion of rock, pop, MPB, and Brazilian rhythms with catchy, danceable melodies. Lee's breakthrough, which included bold lyrical explorations of passion and sexuality, paved the way for subsequent generations of female artists in Brazilian pop by demonstrating commercial viability and artistic independence in a male-dominated scene. Marina Lima, debuting with Simples como Fogo in 1979 and releasing the album Fullgás in 1984, enriched Brazilian pop with elegant, guitar-driven compositions influenced by Baden Powell, the Beatles, and Stevie Wonder. Xuxa emerged as a major pop force with albums tied to her groundbreaking Xou da Xuxa television phenomenon, including the 1988 album Xou da Xuxa 3, which extended pop appeal across children's entertainment and broader audiences while expanding her reach into Latin America and beyond.

Daniela Mercury made her mark in the early 1990s with the albums Daniela Mercury in 1992 and O Canto da Cidade in 1993, infusing axé with pop-rock elements that helped conquer Brazil's wider pop market. Fernanda Abreu launched her solo career with the album SLA Radical Dance Disco Club in 1990 and released the acclaimed Da Lata in 1995, fusing emerging funk from Rio's favelas with samba and international pop influences. This era also witnessed the phenomenon of Sandy & Junior, who transitioned from sertanejo roots to danceable pop with As Quatro Estações (1999), sparking widespread frenzy through massive tours, media dominance, and a licensing empire that opened doors for a wave of teen pop acts in Brazil.

The early 2000s brought further commercial triumphs with singers like Wanessa Camargo, who pursued a consistent pop path from her early albums onward, later exploring electronic and romantic styles, and Kelly Key, who released her self-titled debut album in 2001, establishing herself as a prominent voice in the early decade's Brazilian pop. Rouge, formed via the reality show Popstars in 2002, saw its self-titled debut album propel the group to dominate radio and charts before the contemporary landscape was redefined by Anitta, who has elevated the genre globally through versatile, genre-blending releases incorporating funk, pop, and international collaborations that have introduced Brazilian funk-pop to worldwide audiences.

=== Urban music ===
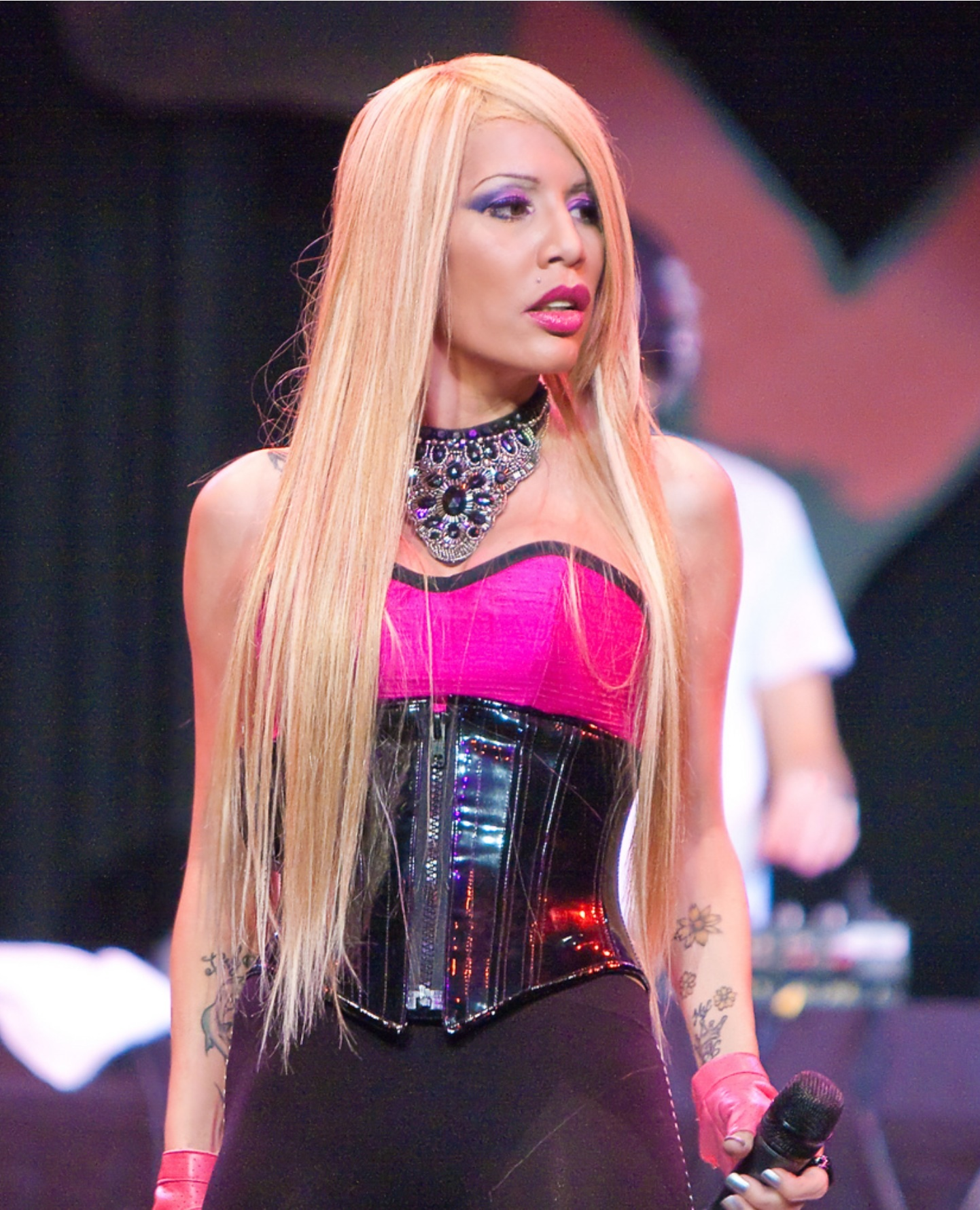
Ivy Queen confronted negative reaction to women's sexually-suggestive dance moves in reggaeton.

As hip-hop and rap became popular in the United States during the 1990s, Latin singers began emulating them. Men dominated the Latin urban scene; women were objectified, seen as accessories indicating male status. Unlike the hip-hop and rap music scenes, their Latin equivalents did not formulate a female role model; female Latina urban singers failed to attain commercial success. During the popularity of Latin freestyle (also called freestyle music or Latin hip-hop) in the 1980s, record companies began signing "attractive young women with little musical talent using the same production style for all of them, weakening rather than strengthening the style." Many Hispanic freestyle singers tried to downplay their Latino identity after radio programmers discriminated against records by Hispanic performers. Lisa Velez changed her name to Lisa Lisa, and became one of the first commercially successful freestyle musicians. Latin hip-hop singer Roja (one half of Rima Roja en Venus) expressed the difficulty of performing (in a male-dominated genre) a song which "insults based on having sex with the opponent's mother, sister, aunt; or calling each other by the names of women's sexual organs. It was bizarre: they were managing to totally objectify women, and at the same time make us invisible." According to Roja, in her early career as a rap freestyler men tried to "shut [her] up". Other female hip-hop singers, such as Guatemalan MC Rebeca Lane and Mexican Audry Funk, concur. Argentinian Actitud María Marta, a hip-hop group formed in prison, has been called a pioneer and has inspired other female hip-hop singers.

Reggaeton dancers (to music exemplifying sexual desire) have received a negative public reception of their sexually-suggestive routines, with most public outcry about this type of dance focusing on female morality. Reggaeton singer Ivy Queen addressed concerns in her 2003 single, "Yo Quiero Bailar", which confronts sexual accessibility; dancing suggestively with a man does not necessarily mean that she wants to sleep with him. Recording Reggaeton Women called Ivy Queen "the spokeswoman for females in reggaeton" after her 2005 debut album, and she remains the only woman visible in the genre. Reggaeton has been criticized for the roles women play. Recordings often reflect lyrics and dance routines suggesting doggy style sex, exemplifying machismo behavior and hypermasculinity. Most reggaeton songs "[circumscribe women] to dancing and fulfilling male sexual desire", which "eliminates almost all possibility of action and translates their presence into a prize or trophy that men exhibit, dominate, and manipulate." In Ivy Queen's song, "Chika Ideal", the singer introduces her female friend to "the dance floor to satisfy her man's fantasies and answer (with her body) each time he wants to call her." In reggaeton music videos, women often act out or "beg for sexual action" from male musicians. In Residente's music video for "Chulin Culin Chunfly", women wore costumes and played police officers, bartenders, and servers. Before reggaeton became popular, Cuban singer Pedro Calvo invited preteens and middle-aged women onstage and began to "[go] down on them". Sexuality among young women in Cuba has been viewed as "normative learning behavior" descended from the Afro-Cuban Palo religion, where men and women dance closely before "the man goes behind the women in a picaresque way" and emulates a "gesture of appreciation". Cover images of reggaeton records often feature women who are "voluptuous, provocative, and scantily clad."

=== Latin pop ===
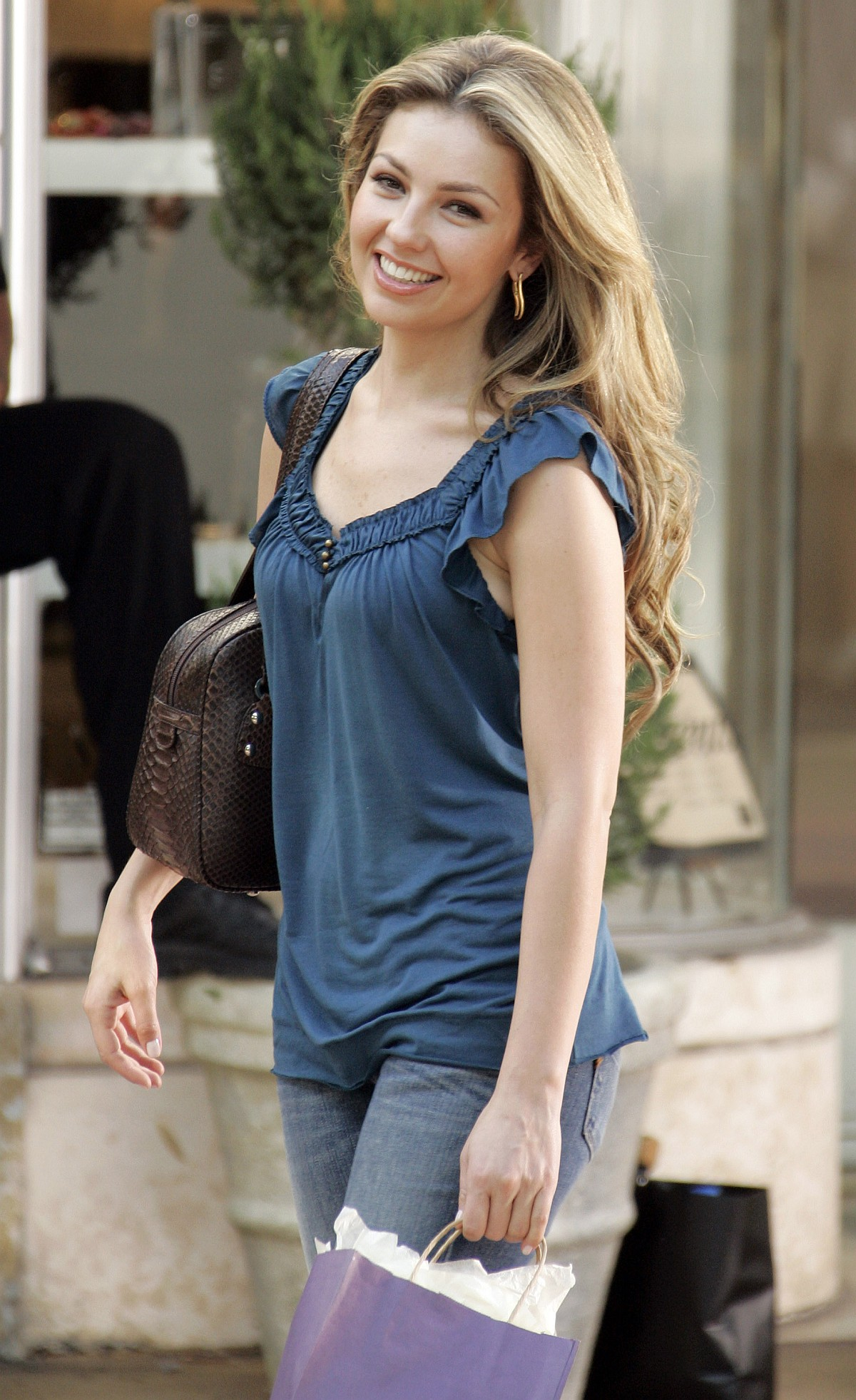
Thalía became popular during the 1990s after her Latin-music debut.

Selena's music and career influenced Jennifer Lopez, who played the singer in her 1997 biographical film and debuted in the Latin music market with salsa singer Marc Anthony on the 1999 single "No Me Ames". Lopez remained in the American pop market through the early 2000s and returned to Latin music with her Spanish-language debut, Como Ama Una Mujer, in 2006. The album was a commercial success, debuting in the top ten of the Billboard 200 and joining the handful of Hispanic artists with an album in the chart's top ten. Mexican actress and singer Thalía debuted on the Latin music scene during the early 1990s. In mid-decade the singer became commercially successful, with her album En Éxtasis (1995) certified platinum. She contributed to three tracks for the 1997 soundtrack of Fox Animation Studios' Anastasia. Thalía's lyrics explore "women or men in a narcissistic, neoliberal, first-world context but do not make sense in the general context of Latin American ordinary life" attributed to other female performers, such as the Mexican singer Paulina Rubio and the Spanish singer Belinda. Thalía and Rubio have been called "young, blonde, and thin", wearing "fashionable" clothing, whose "dull" lyrics assume the role of a "seductive, sexy, young woman who wants a macho-man at heart." According to musicologists Jacqueline Eyring Bixler and Laurietz Seda, Thalía and Rubio's music does not address "mature and/or working-class women".

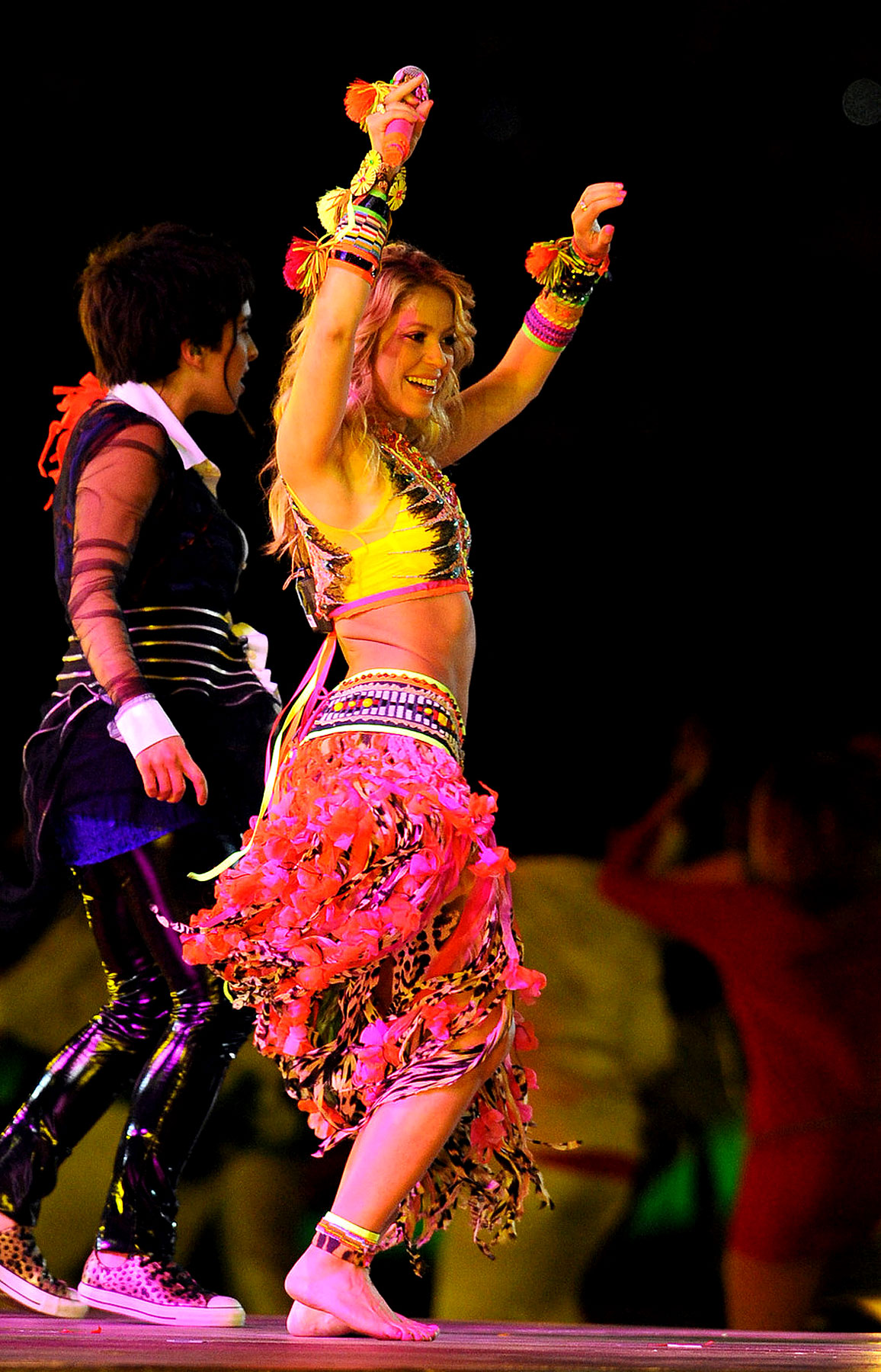
Shakira achieved global success after the 2001 release of "Suerte".

Shakira's major-label debut, Pies Descalzos (1995), was the singer's "breakthrough album" in the Latin-music market and yielded "Estoy Aquí". She had a Latin pop sound, influenced by Middle Eastern and Latin American music. Shakira continued her career with the Emilio Estefan produced Dónde Están los Ladrones? (1998), who went on to produce her first English-language album; it yielded "Suerte", which brought her international success.

Formed in 2006 in Argentina, the Kumbia Queers have recorded cumbia and Latin pop tracks with "ironic and witty articulations of lesbianism [sic] desire". In Spain, Lola Flores is hailed as the queen of flamenco music and Rocío Jurado is considered "one of the purest voices of all time" in the country. Music executive Lynn Santiago, who represented Yolandita Monge, Lissette Melendez, and Vikki Carr during the 1980s, said in a Billboard interview that she wanted "to represent only a few artists to give them individual attention." Latin pop musicians from Puerto Rico, such as Lucecita Benítez and Monge, had male promoters who wanted to "bring local performers" by "offering a big fiesta for the people [of Puerto Rico]." Other Latin pop musicians popular in Puerto Rico during the 1980s include Conchita Alonso, Maggy, Lunna "Cheo" Feliciano, Sophy Hernandez, and the Argentine duo Pimpinela. In mainstream pop, female musicians Mariah Carey, Debelah Morgan, Jessica Simpson, Celine Dion, Carole King, Tina Arena, Gloria Gaynor, Alexia, Jennifer Rush, Lara Fabian, Madonna, Laura Pausini, Beyoncé, Selena Gomez, Demi Lovato, Azealia Banks, Ariana Grande, and Toni Braxton often record Spanish-language versions of their songs.

After winning the inaugural Festival of Latin Song in Puerto Rico in 1969, Lucecita Benítez "single-handedly put Puerto Rico on the map." Her winning song, "Génesis", expressed "extreme male melancholy"; author Licia Fiol-Matta called Benitez a "masculine female" whose delivery "unexpectedly delivered this affect home." Throughout her career, Benítez performed and recorded compositions atypical of Puerto Rican music; nonconforming to gender roles, they did not address heterosexual desire. She survived several silencing attempts by those who disliked her music. Women remain a minority in Puerto Rican music, although singers Myrta Silva, Ruth Fernandez, Ernestina Reyes, and La Calandria have achieved moderate success.

=== Rock en Español ===
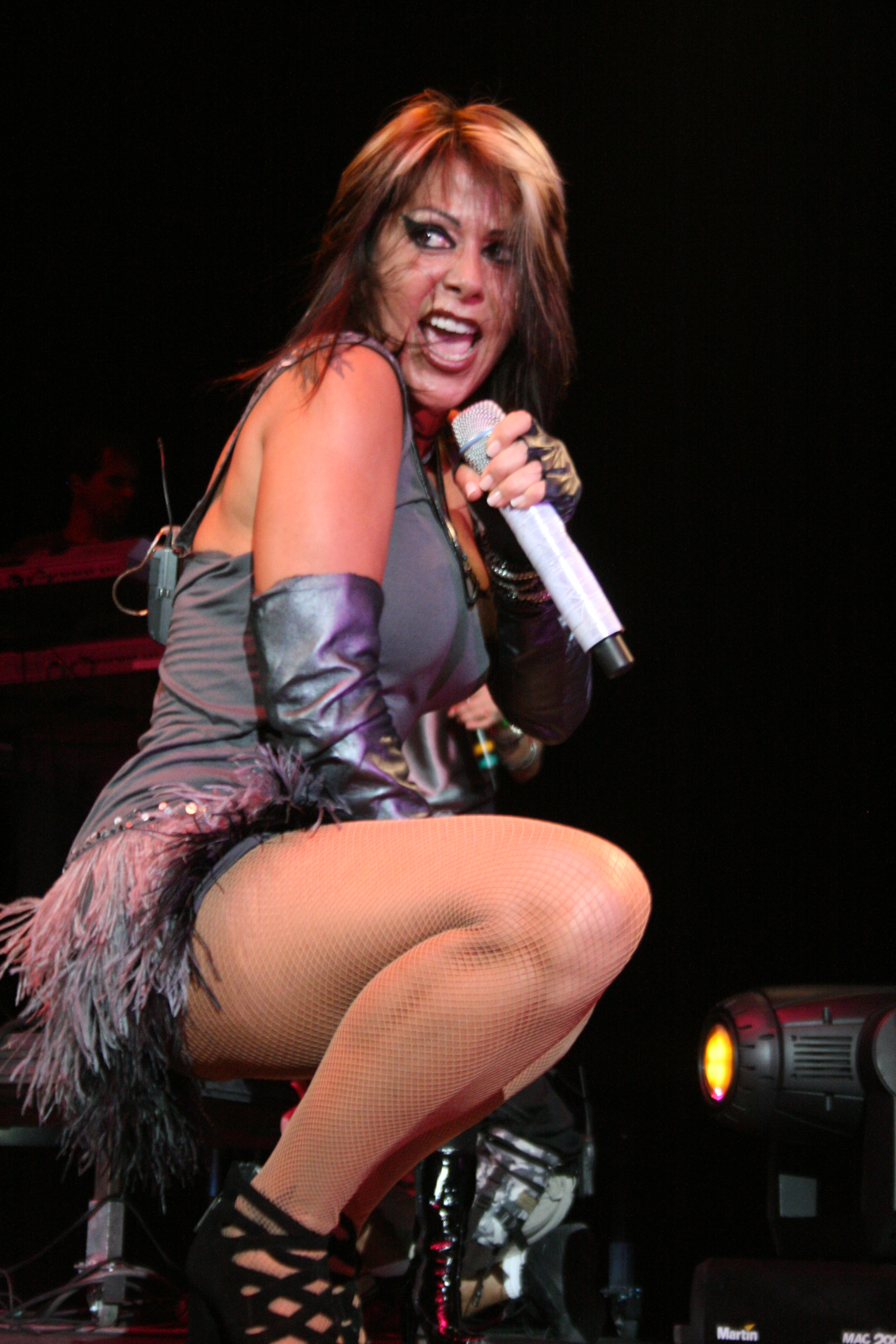
Alejandra Guzmán has been called the "bad girl" of Latin pop and the queen of Latin American rock music.

Colombian singer Andrea Echeverri's music "underlines the hybrid nature of Latin American culture"; called the most-important female rock en español interpreter, she "incorporates [her music with] the past rather than refusing it or mocking it." Echeverri is the lead singer of Aterciopelados, one of the only female-led rock en español bands. She pursues a feminist agenda with her music, which has made her popular in the "most revolutionary and controversial musical genres in Latin America." The singer grew up encouraged by her mother to sing boleros, ballads, and rancheras. She decided to continue her education in the arts, returning to music during the 1980s. Echeverri joined Delia y Los Aminoácidos in the 1990s; influenced by punk and hardcore music, the band's name was later changed to the Aterciopelados. Because of Echeverri's interest the band's repertoire focused on women's issues, with lyrics about women's relationships with men, and performed songs exploring domestic abuse, denouncing misogyny and "overdramatized passionate love", and examining Latin America's ideology and history of traditional love. As her popularity grew, Echeverri became a feminist icon and released an underground recording: Con el Corazón en la Mano (1993). The album, intended as a demo, reached the top ten in Colombia and piqued the interest of BMG Music Group and MTV. The band followed with El Dorado (1995) and went to London to produce La Pipa de la Paz (1996), which was certified gold in Colombia and received Aterciopelados' first nomination for the Grammy Award for Best Latin Alternative Music Album.

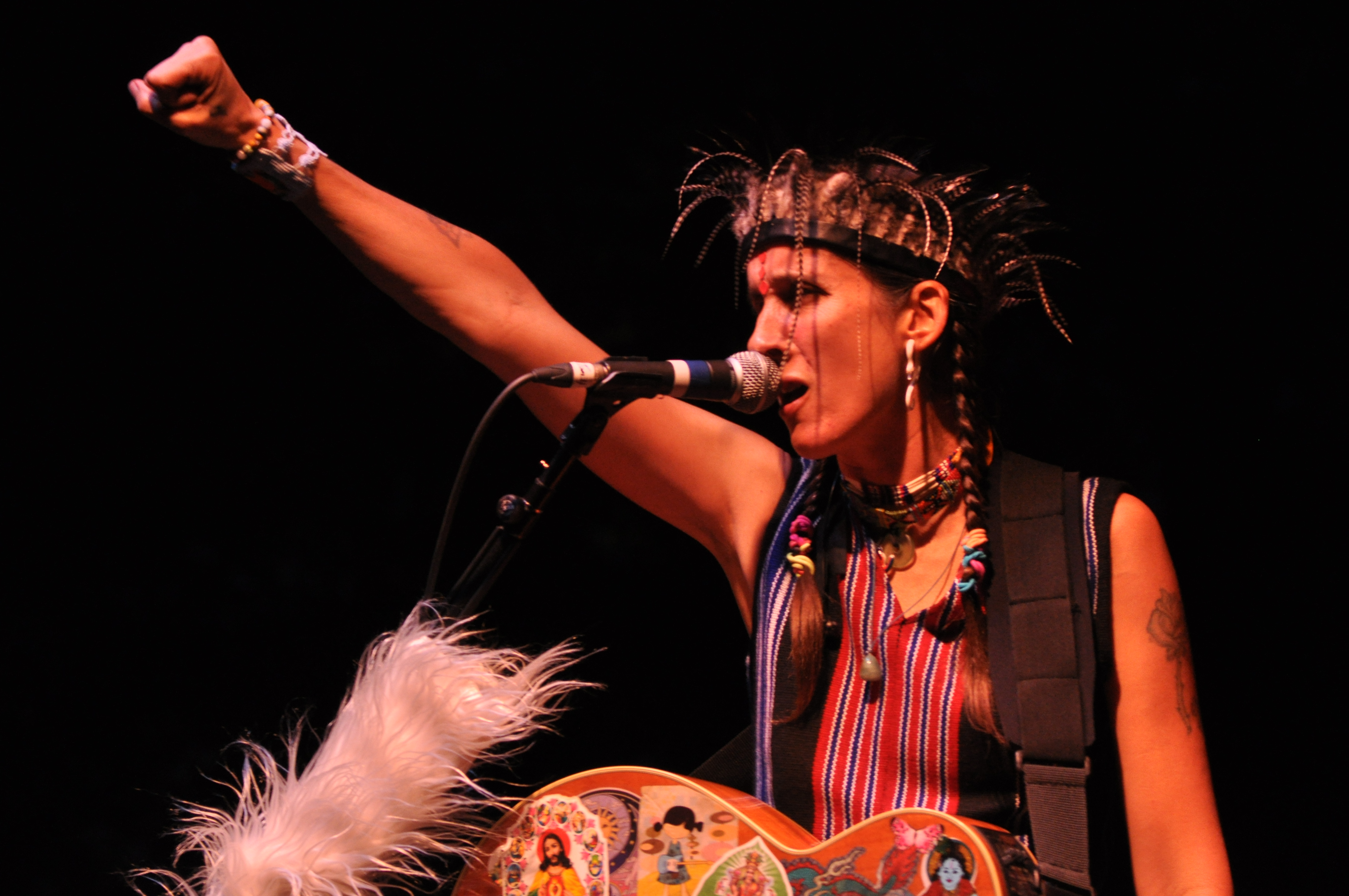
Andrea Echeverri's repertoire has focused on women's issues.

The 1989 single "Virginidad Sacudida" by Mexican hardcore punk band Secta Suicida Siglo explores sexual repression among women, challenged heterosexism in Latin music, and opposed refraining from premarital sex for fear of being called a prostitute. Although some female Latin singers have explored a range of feminist topics, including sexism, domestic abuse, and "reclaiming women's sexuality through their music", others (such as Julieta Venegas) have refrained from labeling themselves as feminists. Venegas said in a 2004 interview that her music has a "feminine point of view" and does not delve into feminism. Called the "bad girl" of Latin pop and the queen of Latin American rock music, Alejandra Guzmán has attained "tabloid notoriety for her flesh-baring displays on stage and for a series of controversial moves and wrong turns in her personal life" but has been credited with breaking barriers in Latin music for women. Her parents, Enrique Guzmán and Silvia Pinal, often recorded and performed music together and were considered the Mexican Sonny and Cher. Other noteworthy rockeras include Ely Guerra, Camila Moreno, Erica Garcia, Christina Rosenvinge, Eva Amaral, Zayra Alvarez, Francisca Valenzuela, Mon Laferte and Nicole.

=== Portuguese, Galician and Brazilian music ===
In Portuguese music, Amália Rodrigues is considered the "best-known and most famous" fadista by author Paul Buck; Rodrigues' lyrics were written by "the most celebrated poets and writers of the day." The singer was instrumental in popularizing fado, "attract[ing] attention around the world." Ana Moura has emerged in modern fado with "transcendent singing [which] personifies [fado music]" and lyrics reflecting "lost love, separation, and longing." Fado, a traditional folk genre popular in Lisbon, was once a male enclave. Female singers such as Mariza, Mísia, Mafalda Arnauth, Dulce Pontes, Cristina Branco, Joana Amendoeira, Raquel Tavares, Yolanda Soares and Kátia Guerreiro have reinvigorated modern fado. In Portuguese folk, Teresa Salgueiro's "rich and enchanting" vocals have been praised. Other Portuguese female singers (Felipa Pais, Marta Dias, Sofia Varela, Anabella, Bevinda, Sara Tavares, Cesaria Evora, Maria João, Marisa Monte, and Lura) have attained moderate success in the country. Cristina Pato, Xiradela, Leilia, Ialma, and Donicelas "represent the rediscovery of the importance of female singers in Galician traditional music." Ugia Pedreira, the Galician lead singer of Marful, "mixes traditional Galician song with new jazz arrangements [and] harmonies."

Daniela Mercury is one of the "best-known Brazilian female singers". During the 1950s, some female singers in Brazil were called prostitutes and risked being labeled "promiscuous or masculine ... [or] lesbians". According to authors Oliver Marshall, Dilwyn Jenkins and David Cleary, the country has "a strong tradition of producing excellent female singers". They list Elis Regina, Gal Costa, Marisa Monte, Silvia Torres, Belô Velloso, and Fernanda Porto as examples of the sizable roster of women in Brazilian music.

== Visibility ==
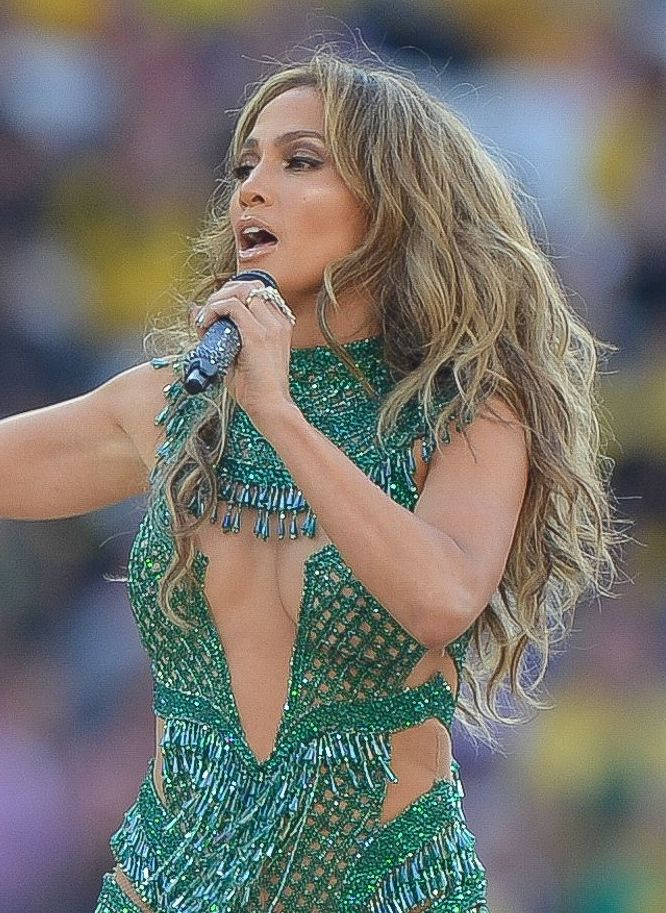
Jennifer Lopez and others have been credited with increasing the visibility of women in Latin music.

Although women have been credited with reshaping Latin music and public perceptions of sexuality, gender, and feminism, the Latin music industry remains male-dominated. American musicologist Ilan Stavans credits Selena, Jenni Rivera, Jennifer Lopez, Ivy Queen, Julieta Venegas, and Ely Guerra for the visibility of women in Latin music. NPR named Maluca, Bomba Estereo, La Lupe, Gloria Trevi, Chavela Vargas, Tita Merello, as "las mostras, fierce women of Latin music." Billboard magazine named Selena as a "role model to Latinas everywhere", and Latina magazine named Gloria Estefan as "a role model for women across the globe." According to Latina, singers Rita Moreno, Selena, Gloria Estefan, Celia Cruz, Shakira, and Jennifer Lopez "changed the world" with their work, achieved "more and [gave] more." With Selena, Jenni Rivera has been credited with the visibility of women in regional Mexican music with the "very large population of Mexican American women in the United States [with whom they] could identify". In Tejano music, Selena's popularity has helped "open the doors" to other female singers. Because of the singer's influence, women in Tejano music emerged "as a significant [demographic]" in the genre during the 1990s and major record labels began increasing their female representation. After Selena, women were "a significant part of [the Tejano and regional Mexican music] industry." Her Dreaming of You (1995) album topped the Billboard 200 chart, the first Hispanic artist and the first woman to do so. At the turn of the 21st century, Thalía, Paulina Rubio, Jennifer Lopez, Shakira, and Pilar Montenegro were the most popular female Latin pop singers. Graciela Beltran, Jennifer Pena, Ana Gabriel, and Paquita la del Barrio were the most popular female singers in their respective regional-Mexican genres, but female singers remain "rare" in regional Mexican music. People en Espanol named singers Lucero, Chiquis Rivera, and Jennifer Lopez in its 2017 list of the top 25 most-powerful Latina women. Billboard released a list of the top 100 music executives, which included Maria Fernandez (senior vice president operations and CFO of Latin Iberia-Sony Music Entertainment) and Rocio Guerrero (global head of Latin content programming for Spotify).

Although women in mariachi music are perceived to be widely accepted, contemporary female singers in the genre have found it an "unwelcoming environment for females." According to the Duranguense group Los Horóscopos de Durango, in 21st-century regional Mexican music it is "hard for women to actually be respected, to be taken into consideration, to be given the time to show [their] talent." The group has found the genre a "struggle" because of male dominance. In 2017, Univision broadcast the reality television competition show La Reina de la Canción (Queen of Song), in which participants with "the best voices, compelling stories, and a desire to become a superstar" compete to become the next star of regional Mexican music. Billboard executive director of Latin content and programming Leila Cobo wrote that the public perception of regional Mexican music is a group of men dressed as cowboys. In the 2004 and 2005 year-end charts, only one female in the genre reached the top twenty; in 2006, there were three. That year, three singles by women topped the Hot Latin Songs chart: Shakira's collaborative single with Wyclef Jean, "Hips Don't Lie"; Paulina Rubio's "Ni Una Sola Palabra", and Anais' "Lo Que Son Las Cosas". In 2008, there were no number-one singles by a woman on the Latin music charts. Early in 2009 Jennifer Lopez ended the drought with "Qué Hiciste" (number one for a week), followed by Gloria Estefan's "No Llores" and Fanny Lu's "Y Si Te Digo". In August 2009 three women (Shakira, Paulina Rubio, and Nelly Furtado) made the top ten of the Hot Latin Songs chart, a "rare occurrence". According to industry observers, women on the charts are "cyclical, as every couple of years a burst of estrogen appears on the typically testosterone-dominated Latin charts."

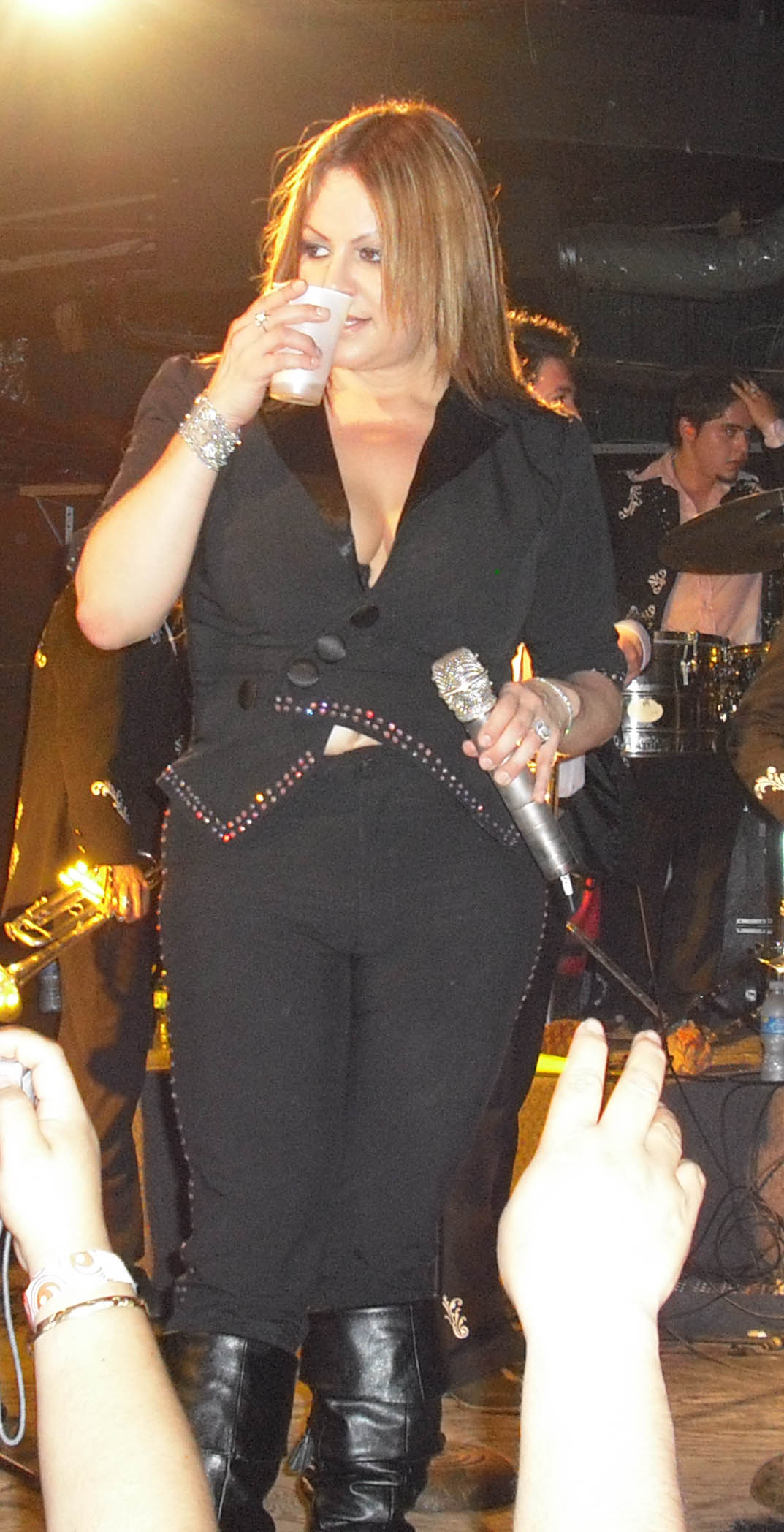
Jenni Rivera's recordings have sparked debate in the Latino community on women's roles.

Women finalists at the 2016 Billboard Latin Music Awards were outnumbered by men, which was described by the magazine as a "continuing [challenge] facing female artists in Latin music." For 2017 International Women's Day and Women's History Month, the music streaming service Spotify curated a playlist of women in Latin music. The playlist included music from Selena, Celia Cruz, and Natalia Lafourcade. An April 2016 Billboard report noted the absence of women from the magazine's music charts. The report found that the last female soloist topped the US Hot Latin Songs chart four years earlier: Shakira, with Maná (a male rock en español group), singing "Mi Verdad". In 2012 seven women had number-ones on the Top Latin Albums chart, compared with 33 men. Billboard executive Leila Cobo found that three of the seven women were veterans (Gloria Trevi, Thalía, and Ednita Nazario), and another three were deceased (Selena, Jenni Rivera, and Natalie Cole. Leslie Grace was the youngest female singer to reach number one on the Latin Airplay chart when she was 17 years old, and Alexandra Lioutikoff was the first woman executive vice-president at Universal Music Publishing Group's Latin division. Asked why the visibility of women in Latin music has declined, Chiquis Rivera suggested that radio programmers are to blame for their "machista culture." According to Lioutikoff, women (unlike their male counterparts) "rarely collaborate". In its report, Billboard compiled a list of the top five women with the most number-ones on the Hot Latin Songs; Gloria Estefan led the list with 15, Shakira had 10, Selena seven, Ana Gabriel six, and Paulina Rubio five. The magazine found women "underrepresented on the Latin-music-focused Billboard charts", with Rubio the last female number-one with "Me Gustas Todo" on 11 February 2012. A discrepancy existed between the Top Latin Albums and the Billboard 200 charts; seven women topped the Latin Albums chart, compared to 21 on the Billboard 200.

Women remain a minority in Puerto Rican music. According to Licia Fiol-Matta, the music industry has a "prejudiced practice of limiting the number of women recording artists" and women singers "did not sell records since women did not buy records." In July 2017, Alejandra Guzmán and Gloria Trevi were the first female collaboration in the 24-year history of the Top Latin Albums chart to debut atop the chart. In 2016, Mexican pop singer Sofia Reyes was the first female lead singer with a number-one single in five years. Her collaboration with Prince Royce on "Solo Yo" was the first number-one single on the Latin Pop Songs chart by a woman since Jennifer Lopez' "Ven A Bailar" (2011) with Pitbull. Eight women have topped the Latin Pop Songs chart as featured acts, duos or groups with female leads: "Solo Yo" (Sofia Reyes with Prince Royce, 23 April 2016); "Mi Verdad" (Maná, featuring Shakira, 4 April 2015); "Corre!" (Jesse & Joy, 31 March 2012); "Dutty Love" (Don Omar with Natti Natasha, 24 March 2012), "Fuiste Tu" (Ricardo Arjona with Gaby Moreno, 10 March 2012); "Give Me Everything" (Pitbull with Ne-Yo, Afrojack and Nayer, 23 July 2011), and "Ven A Bailar" (Jennifer Lopez with Pitbull, 18 June 2011). Amaya Mendizabal of Billboard called the decline of women on the Latin music charts "an ongoing trend." In 2015, 22 weeks passed without a female-led single on the 50-position Hot Latin Songs chart. According to Mendizabal, the absence of women on the Latin music charts is "partly attributed to the steady popularity of reggaeton and regional Mexican music, which is often led by male acts." Mendizabal wrote that "traditional pop songs" rarely top the Hot Latin Songs chart; four pop songs did so in the previous three years, most by men. Sofia Reyes has expressed concern about the lack of women performers at Latin-music awards shows, telling Jeff Benjamin of Fuse TV that 90 percent of awards-show performers are men.

In July 2017, Spanish writer Daniela Bose noted the absence of women in Spanish music charts in comparison with those of France and Italy; culturally similar to Spain, women were more successful in the latter countries. Bose analyzed the Spanish Albums and Singles Charts, finding that the only Spanish singers who placed in the top 50 were Malú, Vanesa Martin, Sweet California, India Martinez, and the Spanish folk music singers Mónica Naranjo and Isabel Pantoja. When Bose expanded her search to the next 50 positions, she found only non-Spanish singers. She concluded that listeners had replaced Spanish and Latin pop music with reggaeton and trap music, genres performed by men with lyrics belittling women "as meat". Bose found a subtext in the songs encouraging female infidelity for sexual reasons, alluding to a non-committed relationship. According to Bose, music "is not one of those 'secure' professions [for those who] seek stability"; she found women absent from prominent positions held by men, such as heading a record label, producing concerts, and audio engineering; in these fields, with higher pay and power, women lack "decision-making process[es] that set the path for [the Latin music] industry." She ended her report by urging the music industry to avoid gender imbalances in their markets: "What dazzles is the beauty of the final work, regardless of who creates it."

== See also ==
- Classic female blues
- Lists of women in music
- Women in classical music
- Women in punk rock
- Women in art
- Women in dance
- Women in film

== Bibliography ==
- "Various – Divas en Espanol". discogs.
- "American Sabor > Profiles > Eva Ybarra". Americansabor.org. Archived from the original on 4 May 2017.
- "Emilio, Selena Dominates Tejano Awards". Billboard. Vol. 108, no. 14. 6 April 1996.
- "Top Grammy nominations". The Register-Guard. Guard Publishing. 6 January 1999a.
- "Dance Trax". Billboard. Vol. 111, no. 27. 3 July 1999b. pp. 29–30.
- "Sounds of L.A." Los Angeles Magazine. Vol. 51, no. 2. February 2006. p. 65.
- "Meet the Billboard Latin Awards Female Artist Finalists". Billboard. 24 February 2016.
- "Women in Music 2016: The 100 Most Powerful Executives". Billboard. 5 December 2016.
- Acosta, Belinda (17 February 2006). "Outlaw Onda If you don't hear Tejano music on the radio, does it exist?". The Austin Chronicle.
- Afolabi, Niyi (2016). Ilê Aiyê in Brazil and the Reinvention of Africa. Springer. ISBN 978-1137598707.
- Alina (30 July 2019). "La Reina Del Mariachi – launches new Album!". News Credit.
- Aparicio, Frances R. (2010). Listening to salsa : gender, Latin popular music, and Puerto Rican cultures. Middletown, CT: Wesleyan University Press. ISBN 978-0819563088.
- Austerlitz, Paul (1997). Merenge : Dominican music and Dominican identity. Philadelphia, PA: Temple University Press. ISBN 1566394848.
- Baker, Geoffrey; Knighton, Tess (2011). Music and urban society in colonial Latin America (1st ed.). Cambridge: Cambridge University Press. ISBN 978-0521766869.
- Benjamin, Jeff (9 March 2017). "Sofia Reyes Talks 'Louder!' Album, Bilingual Lyrics & Supporting Women in Latin Music". Fuse. Archived from the original on 10 March 2017.
- Berne, Terry (20 November 1999). "Spain & Portugal". Billboard. Vol. 111, no. 47. pp. 91–99.
- Berglund, Jeff; Johnson, Jan; Lee, Kimberli (2016). Indigenous Pop: Native American Music from Jazz to Hip Hop. University of Arizona Press. ISBN 978-0816509447.
- Laessig, Gavon (20 February 2010). "Mariachi Divina: New film celebrates legacy of Kansas mariachi legends, Mariachi Estrella de Topeka". Lawrence Journal-World.
- Bixler, Jacqueline; Seda, Laurietz (2009). Trans/acting : Latin American and Latino Performing Arts. Lewisburg: Bucknell University Press. ISBN 978-0838757260.
- Brill, Marlene Targ (2010). America in the 1990s. Minneapolis, Minnesota: Twenty-First Century Books. ISBN 978-0822576037.
- Bose, Daniela (31 July 2017). "Why Are There No Women on Spain's Music Charts? A Guest Essay by Daniela Bose". Billboard.
- Broughton, Simon; Ellingham, Mark; Trillo, Richard (1999). World Music: Latin & North America, Caribbean, India, Asia and Pacific. London: Rough Guides. ISBN 1858286360.
- Buck, Paul (2002). Lisbon : a cultural and literary companion. Oxford: Signal Books. ISBN 1902669355.
- Burr, Ramiro (26 March 2005). "Upcoming Selena Tribute". Billboard. Vol. 117, no. 13. p. 56.
- Candelaria, Cordelia Chávez (2004). Encyclopedia of Latino Popular Culture. Westport, Connecticut: Greenwood Press. ISBN 031333210X.
- Cobo, Leila (13 January 2007a). "Power of The Pen". Billboard. Vol. 119, no. 2.
- Cobo, Leila (6 October 2007b). "Leading Ladies". Billboard. Vol. 119, no. 40.
- Cobo, Leila (22 August 2009). "Women Rule". Billboard. Vol. 121, no. 33.
- Cobo, Leila (2013). Jenni Rivera : the incredible life of a warrior butterfly. Penguin. ISBN 978-0698136205.
- Cobo, Leila (22 April 2016). "Where Are All the Women in Latin Music? Female Artists and Execs on How to Fix the Genre's Exclusion Problem". Billboard.
- Colvin, Michael (2016). Fado and the Urban Poor in Portuguese Cinema of the 1930s and 1940s. Boydell & Brewer. ISBN 978-1855662995.
- D'Amore, Ignacio; López, Mariano (2012). Enciclopedia Gay. Argentina: Penguin Random House Grupo. ISBN 978-9500737968.
- Diaz, Thatina (2017). "People en Español's 25 Most Powerful Women 2017". People en Espanol.
- Dickerson, James L. (2010). Go, Girl, Go!: The Women's Revolution in Music. Schirmer Trade Books. ISBN 978-0857122629.
- Doeden, Matt (2017). American Latin music rumba rhythms, bossa nova, and the salsa sound. Minneapolis: Twenty-First Century Books. ISBN 978-1467701471.
- Fawcett, Susan (2011). Grassroots with Readings: The Writer's Workbook (1st ed.). Cengage Learning. ISBN 978-1133169987.
- Fiol-Matta, Licia (2017). The Great Woman Singer: Gender and Voice in Puerto Rican Music. Duke University Press. ISBN 978-0822373469.
- Flores, Griselda (8 March 2017). "Spotify Celebrates International Women's Day With 'Women of Latin Music' Playlist". Billboard. Archived from the original on 8 March 2017.
- Garsd, Jasmine (22 July 2016). "Las Mostras: Fierce Women Of Latin Music". NPR.
- Greathouse, Patricia (2009). Mariachi (1st ed.). Salt Lake City: Gibbs Smith. ISBN 978-1423602811.
- Guerra, Joey (15 October 2015). "Women raise their voices in regional Mexican music". Houston Chronicle.
- Hernandez, Deborah Pacini (2010). Oye Como Va! Hybridity and identity in Latino Popular Music. Philadelphia, PA: Temple University Press. ISBN 978-1439900918.
- Huerta, Heidi (28 May 2015). "From 'NSYNC To Drake, 13 Artists Who Recorded in Spanish And Didn't Embarrass Themselves". MTV. Archived from the original on 30 May 2015.
- Kottak, Conrad Phillip (2016). Prime-Time Society: An Anthropological Analysis of Television and Culture. Routledge. ISBN 978-1315421926.
- Kuss, Malena (2004). Music in Latin America and the Caribbean: An Encyclopedic History: Volume 1: Performing Beliefs: Indigenous Peoples of South America, Central America, and Mexico (1st ed.). University of Texas Press. ISBN 0292788401.
- Lannert, John (18 June 1994). "Selena Grabs Top Spot on Latin 50". Billboard. Vol. 106, no. 25. p. 34.
- Lannert, John (29 April 2000a). "Ana Barbara Sells Out in Mexico City". Billboard. Vol. 112, no. 18.
- Lannert, John (8 January 2000b). "Latin Acts Get Retail, Radio Boosts Via Dual Singles". Billboard. Vol. 112, no. 2. p. 107.
- Lochery, Neill (2017). Out of the Shadows: Portugal from Revolution to the Present Day. Bloomsbury Publishing. ISBN 978-1472934215.
- Lomelí, Francisco A. Lomelí; Ikas, Karen (2000). U.S. Latino literatures and cultures : transnational perspectives. Heidelberg: C. Winter. ISBN 3-8253-1065-5.
- Marrero, Letisha (November 2003). "Ritmo Roundup". Vibe. Vol. 13, no. 13. p. 172.
- Marshall, Oliver; Jenkins, Dilwyn; Cleary, David (2009). The Rough Guide to Brazil (7th ed.). London: Rough Guides. ISBN 978-1405380201.
- Márquez, Herón (2001). Latin Sensations. Minneapolis, MN: Lerner Publications Co. ISBN 082254993X.
- Martínez, Katynka Zazueta (2003). The "Latin Explosion," media audiences, and the marketing of Latino panethnicity: Latina Magazine and the Latin Grammys in a Post-Selena América. University of California, San Diego.
- Mayfield, Geoff (25 December 1999). "Totally '90s: Diary of a Decade". Billboard. Vol. 111, no. 52. p. YE–16–18. ISSN 0006-2510.
- Mendoza, Sylvia (2004). The Book of Latina Women: 150 Vidas of Passion, Strength, and Success. Avon, Massachusetts: Adams Media. ISBN 1593372124.
- Mendizabal, Amaya (12 April 2016). "Sofia Reyes Ends 5-Year Drought of Leading Ladies Atop Latin Pop Songs Chart". Billboard.
- Miguélez-Carballeira, Helen (2014). Companion to Galician Culture. Boydell & Brewer Ltd. ISBN 978-1855662773.
- Miller, Michael (2008). The complete idiot's guide to music history. Indianapolis, IN: Alpha. ISBN 978-1592577514.
- Morales, Ed (2003). The Latin beat : the rhythms and roots of Latin music from bossa nova to salsa and beyond. Cambridge, MA: Da Capo Press. ISBN 0306810182.
- Navarro, Marysa; Sánchez, Virginia; Ali, Kecia (1999). Women in Latin America and the Caribbean: Restoring women in history. Bloomington, IN: Indiana University. ISBN 025321307X.
- Novas, Himilce (2007). Everything You Need to Know About Latino History: 2008 Edition (2nd ed.). Penguin Books. ISBN 978-1101213537.
- Nunez, Alanna (9 October 2014). "9 Songs That Sound Better in Spanish". Cosmopolitan.
- Paredez, Deborah (2009). Selenidad: Selena, Latinos, and the Performance of Memory. Duke University Press. ISBN 978-0-8223-9089-3.
- Pareles, Jon (7 March 1992). "La Lupe, a Singer, Is Dead at 53; Known as 'Queen of Latin Soul'". The New York Times.
- Patoski, Joe Nick (1996). Selena: Como La Flor. Boston: Little Brown and Company. ISBN 0-316-69378-2.
- Patoski, Joe Nick (May 2000). "Tuned Out". Texas Monthly.
- Palomares, Sugey (4 March 2013). "40 Latinas Who Have Changed the World!". Latina. Archived from the original on 1 May 2017.
- Pendle, Karin (2001). Women & Music A History (2nd ed.). Bloomington: Indiana University Press. ISBN 0253115035.
- Poey, D. (2014). Cuban Women and Salsa: To the Beat of Their Own Drum. Springer. ISBN 978-1137382825.
- Preston, David A. (2014). Latin American Development: Geographical Perspectives (2nd ed.). Routledge. ISBN 978-1317892106.
- Richmond, Clint (1995). Selena! : The Phenomenal Life and Tragic Death of the Tejano Music Queen (1st ed.). New York, N.Y.: Pocket Books. ISBN 0-671-54522-1.
- Rivera, Raquel Z.; Marshall, Wayne; Hernandez, Deborah Pacini (2010). Reggaeton. Durham, NC: Duke University Press. ISBN 978-0822392323.
- Rivera-Servera, Ramón H. (2012). Performing Queer Latinidad : Dance, Sexuality, Politics. Ann Arbor, Michigan: University of Michigan Press. ISBN 978-0472051397.
- Rigby, Claire (9 August 2015). "How Latin American women are changing hip-hop". The Guardian.
- Riviezzi, Dennis (2013). Recuerdame. Blommington, IN: Palibrio. ISBN 978-1463348458.
- Roberts, John Storm (1999). The Latin Tinge: The Impact of Latin American music on the United States (2nd ed.). New York: Oxford University Press. ISBN 0195121015.
- Roterman, Natalie (26 March 1995). "Selena Quintanilla Songs: Remembering Queen Of Tejano Music's Best Tunes On 20th Death Anniversary". The Latin Times. Archived from the original on 3 August 2015.
- Rother, Larry (25 March 2011). "Carving Out a Bold Destiny for Fado". The New York Times.
- Santiago, Javier (24 May 1986). "Viva Puerto Rico". Billboard. Vol. 99, no. 21.
- San Miguel, Guadalupe (2002). Tejano proud : Tex-Mex music in the twentieth century. College Station, TX: Texas A&M Univ. Press. ISBN 1585441880. - Read online, registration required
- Simonis, Damien (2007). Spain (6th ed.). Footscray: Lonely Planet Publications. ISBN 978-1741045543.
- Socolow, Susan Migden (2000). The Women of Colonial Latin America (1st ed.). Cambridge Univ. Press. ISBN 0521476429.
- Stacy, Lee (2002). Mexico and the United States. Marshall Cavendish. ISBN 0761474021.
- Stavans, Illan (1998). The riddle of Cantinflas essays on Hispanic popular culture (1st ed.). Albuquerque: University of New Mexico Press. ISBN 0-8263-5257-X.
- Stavans, Ilan (2009). Encyclopedia Latina: History, Culture, And Society In The United States (4th ed.). Danbury, CT: Grolier Academic Reference. ISBN 978-0-7172-5815-4.
- Sturman, Janet (2015). The Course of Mexican Music. Routledge. ISBN 978-1317551133.
- Steingress, Gerhard (2002). Songs of the Minotaur : hybridity and popular music in the era of globalization : a comparative analysis of rebetika, tango, rai, flamenco, sardana, and English urban folk. LIT Verlag Münster. ISBN 3825863638.
- Tompkins, Cynthia Margarita; Foster, David William (2001). Notable Twentieth Century Latin American Women (1st ed.). Westport, Connecticut: Greenwood Press. ISBN 0313311129.
- Waxer, Lise (2002). Situating Salsa : Global Markets and Local Meanings in Latin Popular Music. Routledge. ISBN 1135725349.
- Villafañe, Veronica (17 April 2017). "Univision's New Reality Show Seeks Next Female Mexican Regional Music Superstar". Forbes.
- Zellner, Xander (12 July 2017). "Gloria Trevi & Alejandra Guzman Debut at No. 1 on Top Latin Albums Chart With 'Versus'". Billboard.
