= Grammy Award for Best Latin Urban Album =

The Grammy Award for Best Latin Urban Album has been awarded since 2008. Years reflect the year in which the Grammy Awards were presented, for works released in the previous year. In 2010, this category was joined with the Latin Rock field, to be renamed Best Latin Rock, Alternative or Urban Album.

== Recipients ==
Year	Winner	Nominations
2009	Los Extraterrestres by Wisin & Yandel	La Novela by Akwid; La Sinfonia by La Sinfonia; The Royalty: La Realeza by RKM & Ken-Y; En lo Claro by Julio Voltio
2008	Residente o Visitante by Calle 13	E.S.L. by Akwid; El Abayarde Contraataca by Tego Calderón; El Cartel: The Big Boss by Daddy Yankee; Vacanería! by Fulanito

== See also ==
- Grammy Award for Best Música Urbana Album
- Category:Chicano rap
- Category:Latin hip-hop
- Category:Grammy Awards for Latin music
