= Voltage AC =

Studio album by Voltio
- Released: December 14, 2004
- Genre: Reggaeton; Latin; R&B
- Label: White Lion; Jiggiri

Voltio chronology
Los Dueños del Estilo (2003)	Voltage AC (2004)	Voltio (2005)

Voltage AC is the debut solo album by Puerto Rican reggaeton artist Voltio. It was released in 2004 through record label Sony BMG. The album sold more than 200,000 copies to date, including 50,000 in Japan.

== Track listing ==
1. Intro
2. Julito Maraña (feat. Tego Calderón)
3. Maleante de Cartón
4. Cocorota
5. Pa' Guayarte Ese Mini (feat. John Eric)
6. Voltio
7. Locked-Up (Remix) (feat. Akon)
8. Mambo
9. Esto Es De Nosotros (feat. Maestro)
10. No Amarres Fuego (feat. Zion & Lennox)
11. Se Van (feat. Tego Calderón)
12. Bumper (produced by Luny Tunes)
13. Voltio (Remix) (feat. Maestro)
14. No Meten Feca
15. Cáscara
16. Achero Pa' Un Palo (feat. Sonora Ponceña)

== Charts ==
Chart (2005)	Peak position
US Top Latin Albums (Billboard)	14
US Tropical Albums (Billboard)	3
US Reggae Albums (Billboard)	2
US Heatseekers Albums (Billboard)	33
