= Voltio (album) =

Studio album by Voltio
- Released: December 27, 2005
- Recorded: 2005
- Genres: Reggaeton; hip hop
- Length: 50:27
- Labels: Sony BMG; White Lion
- Producers: Nesty; Victor; Tainy; Luny Tunes

Voltio chronology
Voltage AC (2004)	Voltio (2005)	En lo Claro (2007)

Singles from Voltio
- 1. "Chulin Culin Chunfly" Released: November 14, 2005; 2. "Chévere" Released: February 27, 2006

Professional ratings
Review scores
Source	Rating
AllMusic	4/5 stars

Voltio is the second studio album by Puerto Rican reggaeton performer Voltio, released on December 27, 2005, by Sony BMG and White Lion.

== Release and success ==
Released roughly a year after his debut solo album Voltage AC, Voltio charted and sold well, partly due to the success of the single "Chulin Culin Chunfly", a collaboration with reggaeton performer Residente of Calle 13. It sold 4,020 copies in its first week, debuting at number twenty on the Billboard Top Latin Albums chart.

== Track listing ==
1. "Intro" — 3:05
2. "Chulin Culin Chunfly" (featuring Calle 13) (Padilla, E. F./Perez, R./Ramos, J.) — 4:35
3. "Chévere" (featuring Notch) (Howell, N./Masis, M. E./Ramos, J.) — 3:45
4. "Dame de Eso" (Masis, M. E./Ramos, J.) — 3:26
5. "No Vamos a Parar" (featuring Zion) (Harper R. Michael/Ortiz, F./Ramos, J.) — 3:42
6. "La Culebra" (Ramos, J./Sanchez, A.) — 3:11
7. "Maleante de Cartón" (Ramos, J../Rivera, L. A. Santiago) — 4:18
8. "Bombón" (Masis, M. E./Ramos, J.) — 3:09
9. "Julito Maraña" (featuring Tego Calderón) (Ortiz, J./Ramos, J./Rodoriguez, A.) — 3:24
10. "Matando la Liga" (Colón, G. A./Ramos, J.) — 3:21
11. "Bumper" (Perez, A./Ramos, J.) — 3:32
12. "Un Dedo" (Ramos, J.) — 3:39
13. "Voltio" (featuring Maestro) (Ramos, J./Rodriguez, A.) — 3:51
14. "Chulin Culin Chunfly (The Rattlesnake Song)" (featuring Calle 13 and Three 6 Mafia) (Beauregard, P./Houston, J./Padilla, E. F./Ramos, J.) — 3:41

== Chart performance ==
Released in 2005, at a time when reggaeton was making a major breakthrough into the mainstream audience, the album peaked at number 17 on the Billboard Top Latin Albums chart and number 15 on the Heatseekers Albums chart. The album became a crossover hit, reaching number 98 on the Top R&B/Hip-Hop Albums chart.

Chart (2006)	Peak position
U.S. Billboard Top Latin Albums	17
U.S. Billboard Heatseekers Albums	15
U.S. Billboard Latin Rhythm Albums	8
U.S. Billboard Top R&B/Hip-Hop Albums	98
