= El Mellao =

Single by Voltio

from the album En lo Claro
- Released: September 2007
- Recorded: 2007
- Genre: Reggaeton
- Length: 3:42
- Label: Sony BMG
- Songwriter(s): Julio Ramos

Voltio singles chronology
"Claro de Luna" (2006)	"El Mellao" (2007)	"Pónmela" (2007)

"El Mellao" (English: "The Toothless") is the first single by Puerto Rican reggaeton performer Voltio, released in September 2007 by Sony BMG. The female voice has not been revealed on the album printing. The remix features reggaeton artists Ñejo & Dalmata.

== Music video ==
The music video features a more humorous setting in Puerto Rico. It also features a cameo appearance by Residente of Calle 13, and another appearance by the man who is featured on the single's cover.

== Charts ==
The song peaked at number 12 on the Latin Rhythm Airplay chart.

Chart (2007)	Peak position
U.S. Billboard Latin Rhythm Airplay	12
