= En lo Claro =

Studio album by Voltio
- Released: November 20, 2007
- Recorded: 2007
- Genre: Reggaeton; hip hop
- Length: 56:30
- Label: Sony BMG; Jiggiri
- Producer: Voltio; DJ Giann; Dexter & Mr. Greenz; DJ Blass; DJ Nelson; Stixx; AX

Voltio chronology
Voltio (2005)	En lo Claro (2007)

Singles from En Lo Claro
- 1. "El Mellao" Released: September 17, 2007; 2. "Pónmela" Released: January 14, 2008; 3. "Un Amor Como Tú" Released: May 5, 2008

En lo Claro (English: In the Clear) is the third and final studio album by Puerto Rican reggaeton performer Voltio, released on November 20, 2007 by Sony BMG. It received a nomination for Best Latin Urban Album at the Grammy Awards of 2009.

== Track listing ==
1. "Perco C" (DJ Giann, Dexter & Mr. Greenz) — 2:31
2. "El Mellao" (Almonte) — 3:42
3. "Yo Sé Que Tiemblas" (Stixx, AX) — 3:16
4. "Me Pones Mal" (Nely "El Arma Secreta") — 4:04
5. "Pónmela" (featuring Jowell y Randy) (DJ Giann, Dexter & Mr. Greenz) — 4:00
6. "Feka" (featuring Vivanativa) (Vivanativa, Chile, Vivoni) — 3:34
7. "Baile y Seducción" (Gabo, Chile, Vivoni) — 3:17
8. "Un Amor Como Tú" (featuring Arcángel) (Vivoni, Chile) — 3:53
9. "Tú Te Crees" (featuring Pirulo) — 3:27
10. "Pelea" — 3:57
11. "Tamo' a lo Loco" (DJ Nelson) — 3:56
12. "Perdóname" (Nely "El Arma Secreta") — 3:35
13. "Cristina" (featuring Cucu Diamantes) — 4:25
14. "En lo Claro" (Stixx, AX) — 4:54

== Singles ==
#	Singles	Date
1.	"El Mellao"	September 2007
2.	"Pónmela"	January 2008
3.	"Un Amor Como Tú"	May 2008

== Chart performance ==
Though not as successful as Voltio's previous two albums, the album still peaked at number 36 on the U.S.Billboard Top Latin Albums chart and number 24 on the Billboard Top Heatseekers chart.

Chart (2007)	Peak position
U.S. Billboard Top Latin Albums	36
U.S. Billboard Heatseekers Albums	24
