= Pónmela =

Single by Voltio featuring Jowell & Randy

from the album En lo Claro
- Released: January 2008
- Recorded: 2007
- Genre: Hip hop
- Length: 4:02
- Label: Sony BMG
- Songwriter(s): Julio Ramos; Joel Muñoz; Randy Ortiz
- Producer(s): DJ Giann; Dexter & Mr. Greenz

Voltio singles chronology
"El Mellao" (2007)	"Pónmela" (2008)

"Pónmela" (English: "Put It on Me") is the second single by Puerto Rican reggaetonero Voltio, released in January 2008, by Sony BMG. It features reggaeton duo Jowell & Randy. The song is also featured in the game Grand Theft Auto IV.

== Music video ==
A video was released in late January 2008. It features Voltio and Jowell & Randy.

== Chart positions ==
Chart (2008)	Peak position
U.S. Billboard Hot Latin Songs	41
