= Audry Funk =

Audry Bustos Díaz, known as Audry Funk (Puebla, October 25, 1987), is an artivist, philosopher, writer and singer, especially popular for her feminist rap. Funk was born in Mexico, and migrated to New York. She lives in Bronx, which is one of the topics of her art. Alongside the Guatemalan MC Rebeca Lane, Funk was one of the leaders of Somos Mujeres Somos Hip Hop, merely translated as "We are Women We are Hip Hop." Funk is internationally recognized in the independent music scene and within the community of Latin American rappers.

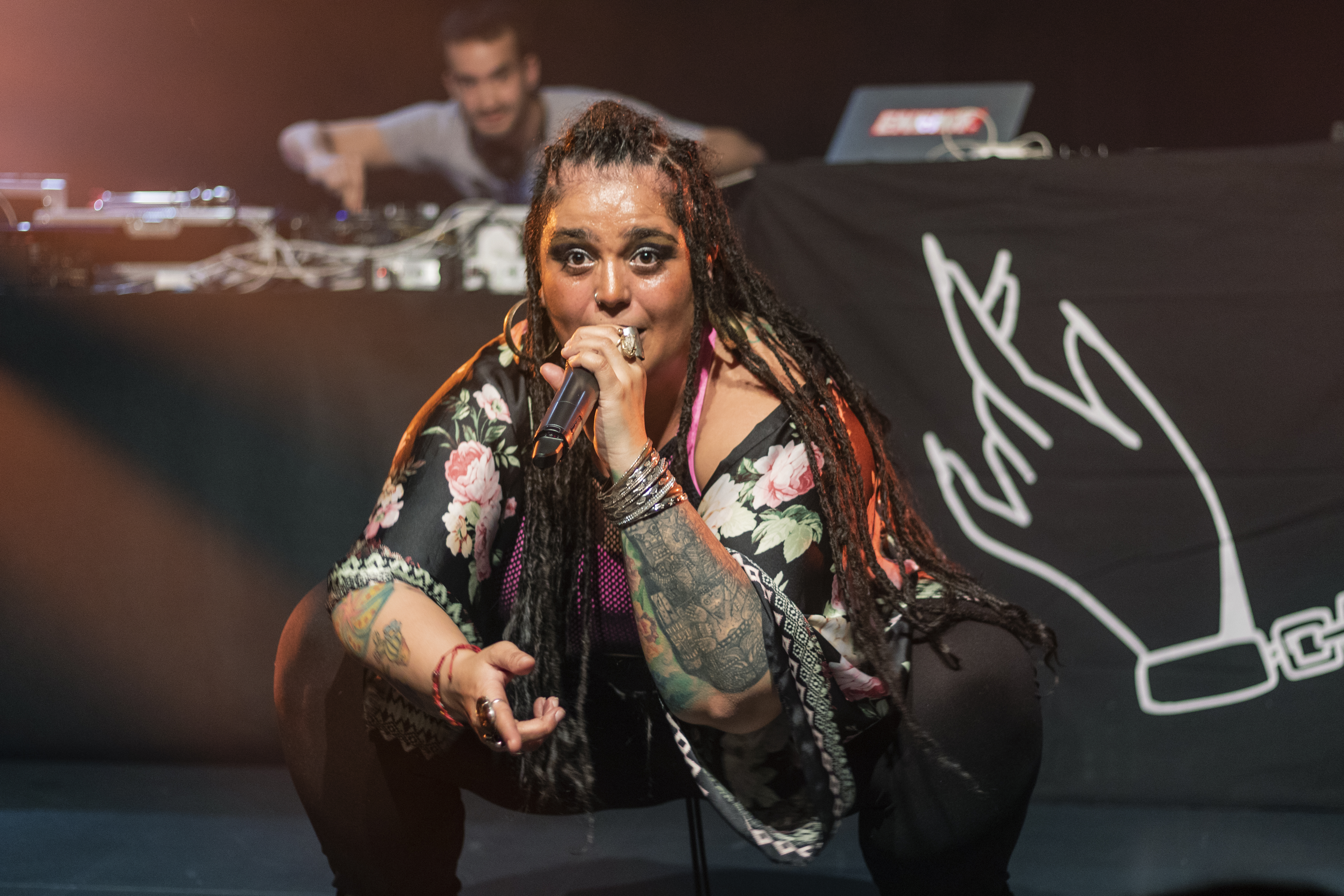
Audry Funk in the Basque Country in 2019

== Biography ==
Audry Funk was born in Puebla, Mexico, where she grew up with her family. At the age of 15, Audry had her first soloist presentation, as singer of a reggae band. Since that moment, Funk started to write lyrics on social justice.

Funk studied philosophy at the Meritorious Autonomous University of Puebla. Later on, she migrated to New York, where she continued to produce independent music. In this city, her voice has recognition within the Mexican migrant community. In 2018 a documentary on Funk's migration history was released.

== Art and social justice ==
Audry Funk mixes reggae, hip-hop, sound, and funk in her music. Her art is a form of activism for unity, respect, politics, and emancipation. Some recurrent topics of her work are women rights, migration, antiracism, body diversity, and fat liberation. Her art production is independent, based on self-management and collaborative work. In the 2010s, she was part of Somos Guerreras (We are warriors) along with Rebeca Lane. They dedicated their efforts to change the ideas regarding women MC in Hip-Hop culture and led workshops in different communities across Central America. Funk continues to collaborate with many different artist, including co-creating a disc with Lane in 2024.

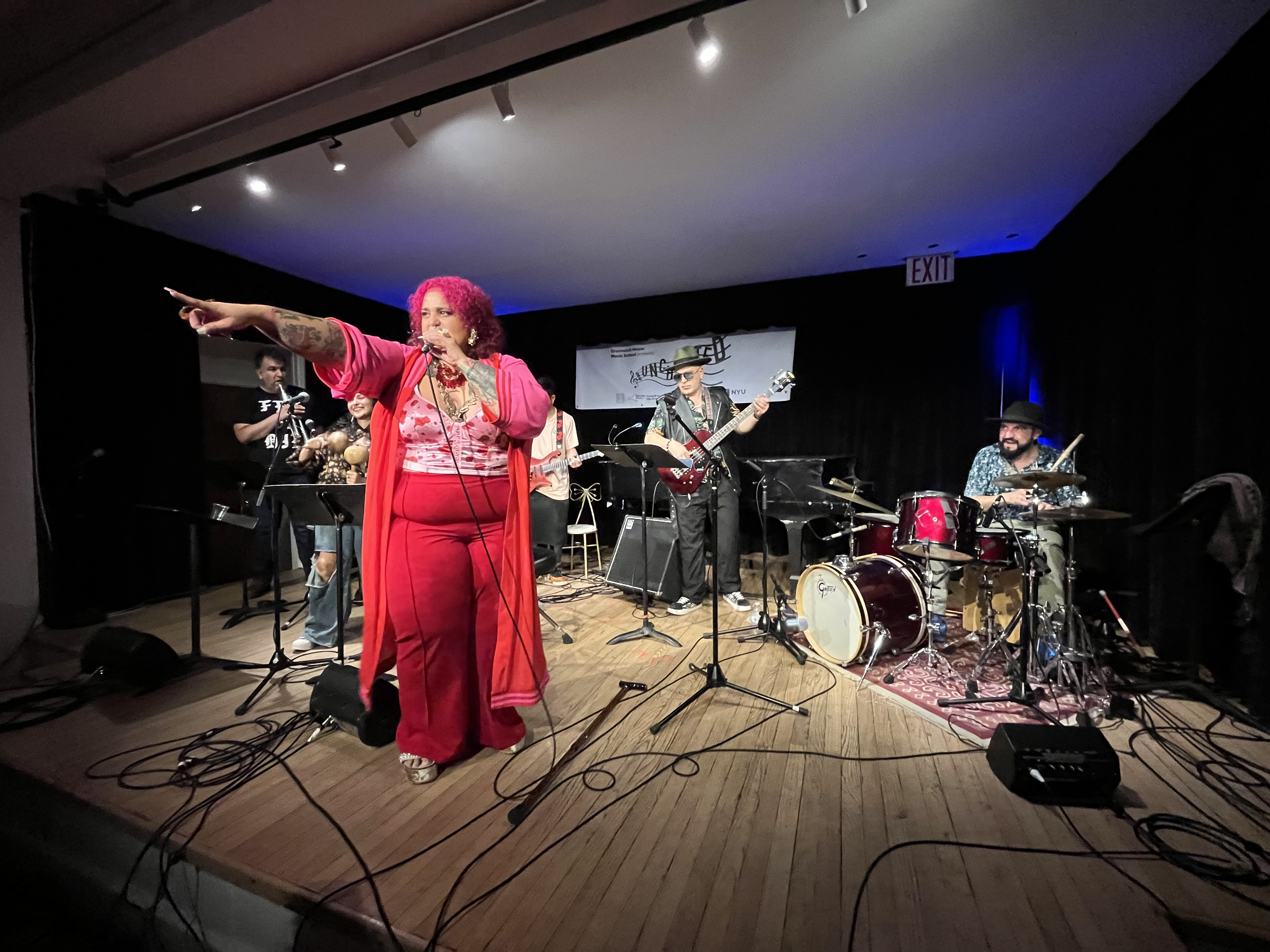
Audry Funk singing at Uncharted Series 2026 at Greenwich House Music School along with Felipe Fournier (percussion), Daniel Espiliz (guitar), Juan Sebastián Monsalve (bass), Hugo Moreno (trumpet), and Lina Silva (backing)

Audry has performed in important cultural centers for the Latino community in the United States, including the National Museum of Mexican Art in Chicago, and Lincoln Center and SOB's in New York City. She has also perform in festivals, including Celebrate Brooklyn. In addition to the USA and her native Mexico, Funk has performed in Guatemala, El Salvador, Costa Rica, Panama, Dominican Republic, Ecuador, Bolivia, Chile, Germany, and Spain, among other countries.

== Other pedagogical and cultural activities ==
Alongside her art production, Funk is an active participant in educational events and community processes. She has been invited as a speaker to different institutions, including Harvard University. She has led numerous hip-hop workshops for different communities, such as "Feminist protest and sisterhood via rap" at the Tlatelolco University Cultural Center in Mexico City.

== Awards ==
- 2026 Elebash Uncharted Artist in Residence Program
- 2025 Bronx Recognizes its own
- 2024 Best Videoclip for the song Perrísima, Videoclip Festival Panorama Timbrico (Mexico).

== Discography ==
- Manual para sobrevivir un breakup (2026)
- 40ntonas y Sabrosas (2024), featuring Rebeca Lane
- Upsilon Scorpii (2024)
- Autogestión y Resistencia (2017)
- Verso...Luego existo (2015)

== Music videos ==
Some of her videos are:

- 2024 Todxs lxs cuerpxs
- 2023 Scorpio
- 2023 TBM
- 2023 Acuerdos
- 2023 KATANA
- 2023 Perrisima
- 2022 Sin Retroceder
- 2020 Autogestión
- 2019 Tempestad en las mareas
- 2017 Hija del Subdesarrollo
- 2015 Fuerza Omega
- 2012 Rompiendo esquemas
