= Chulin Culin Chunfly =

2005 single by Julio Voltio and Residente

Single by Voltio featuring Residente

from the album Voltio
- Released: November 14, 2005
- Recorded: 2005
- Genre: Reggaeton
- Length: 4:39
- Label: Sony BMG; White Lion
- Songwriters: Julio Ramos; René Pérez
- Producer: Nesty "La Mente Maestra"

Julio Voltio singles chronology
"Bumper" (2005)	"Chulin Culin Chunfly" (2005)	"Chévere" (2006)

"Chulin Culin Chunfly" is the third single by Puerto Rican reggaeton performer Julio Voltio, from his eponymous second studio album, Voltio. It was released on November 14, 2005, by Sony BMG and White Lion. The album version features Residente of Calle 13, while the remix adds American hip hop group Three 6 Mafia. The music video features Voltio and Residente Calle 13 in various scenes inspired from movies.

== Official versions ==
- Album version (featuring Residente Calle 13) – 4:39
- Remix (featuring Residente Calle 13 and Three 6 Mafia) – 3:41

== Chart performance ==
The single was Voltio's most successful to date, peaking at number eight on the Billboard Hot Latin Songs chart. The album version single, though not as successful, still managed to peak at number 18 on the same chart.

=== Charts ===
Chart (2006)	Peak position
US Billboard Hot Latin Songs	8
