= Julio Voltio =

Puerto Rican rapper (born 1977)

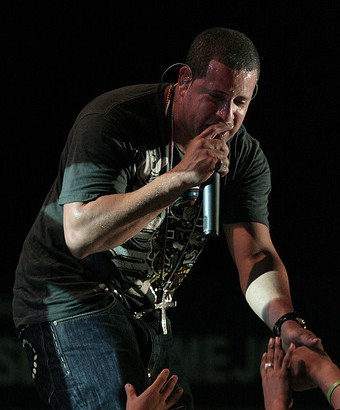
- Voltio performing in Managua, Nicaragua on July 31, 2007

Background information
- Also known as: El Chamaco
- Born: Julio Irving Ramos Filomeno; June 11, 1977 (age 49); Santurce, San Juan, Puerto Rico
- Genre: Reggaeton
- Occupations: Rapper; singer
- Instrument: Vocals
- Years active: 1994–2014
- Labels: Sony BMG; White Lion; Jiggiri; Bandidaje

Julio Irving Ramos Filomeno (born June 11, 1977), known professionally as Julio Voltio or Voltio, is a Puerto Rican former rapper. An early pioneer of reggaetón—a modern genre of Latin music originating in Puerto Rico, with sonic roots in Jamaican dancehall and American hip hop—Voltio officially retired from the music industry in 2014, having converted to Evangelicalism.

The name "Voltio"—meaning "(electrical) volt"—came about after an incident, during his time as an electrician, in which he inadvertently placed his hand in the wrong location and received an electric shock. At that point, he began being referred to by friends as "Bombillo" ("light bulb") or "Corto-Circuito" ("short-circuit"), until eventually calling him "Voltio".

The artists formerly known as Voltio now identifies as a born-again Christian, once stating in an interview: "…Yes, really[,] I accepted Christ as my savior[;] I really do [accept Christ,] because sometimes you have a void in the hearts [your heart] and therefore need to search for Christ."

== Music career ==
Growing up in the Parque Ecuestre Carolina, San Juan, Voltio entered the music business as a teenager. Together with Rey 29 and Héctor el Father, he formed The Masters of Funk. Although the trio released no official music, they were influential in starting the local, island reggaetón movement of the 1990s.

Shortly after separating from The Masters of Funk, Voltio partnered with Karel, a neighborhood friend, forming the duo Karel y Voltio. They released their debut album Los Dueños del Estilo ("the owners of the style") in 2003. The album did not make a critical or commercial impact, however, and the duo's enthusiasm dwindled. Karel was last featured on La Mision 4 (2004), a compilation album by Luny Tunes.

Voltio was eventually signed under Raphael 'Raphy' Pina's label, Pina Records; Pina subsequently stole money from Voltio, resulting in his departing from that label. Voltio then went into musical "battle-mode", releasing diss-tracks (or tiraeras) against Pina Records and the label's signed artists, with songs such as "Bling Bling" and "Guasa Guasa", both duets with fellow Pina-affected artist Tego Calderón. With few options remaining, Voltio was preparing to exit the music business until Calderón, a primary artist with White Lion Records, convinced him to sign with the label. Having taken Tego's advice, Voltio released the album Voltage ACc(2004), featuring the hits "Bumper", "No Amarres Fuego" (featuring Zion & Lennox) and "Julito Maraña".

Voltio also was featured on a remix of the song "Locked Up" by Senegal-based singer Akon, released in the UK as part of Locked Up-Global Remixes.

Having experienced relative success, Voltio returned with his self-titled release in 2005, which included his biggest hit to date, "Chulín Culín Chunflai", which features Residente, and a remixed version with American hip hop group Three 6 Mafia. In 2006, Voltio appeared on Frankie's 2006 remix of "Puerto Rico".

Voltio teamed up with Calle 13 to speak-out against police brutality in Puerto Rico. On August 11, 2008, he announced the publication of a documentary titled En vivo desde Oso Blanco. The documentary covers the time that Voltio spent in prison and his release.

Voltio was featured on the Grand Theft Auto IV soundtrack with his song "Pónmela", from the album En lo Claro (2007). He also collaborated with Jowell & Randy on "Welcome To My Crib".

En lo Claro experienced lukewarm success in-contrast to Voltio's first two albums, reaching No. 36 on the U.S. Billboard Top Latin Albums chart and No. 24 on the Top Heatseekers chart, respectively.

In 2014, Voltio left reggaetón completely, having converted to Evangelical Christianity.

== Discography ==
=== Albums ===
Solo albums

- 2004: Voltage AC
- 2005: Voltage DC
- 2007: En lo Claro

Other albums

- 2003: Los Dueños del Estilo

=== Singles ===
- 2004: "Julito Maraña" (feat. Tego Calderón)
- 2004: "Bumper"
- 2004: "Lock Up" (Akon feat Voltio)
- 2005: "Mambo"
- 2005: "Bumper (Official Remix)" (feat. Pitbull & Lil Rob)
- 2005: "Chulin Culin Chunfly" (feat. Residente Calle 13)
- 2005: "Chulin Culin Chunfly (remix)" (feat. Residente Calle 13 & Three 6 Mafia)
- 2005: "Se Van, Se Van" (feat. Tego Calderón)
- 2005: "Matando La Liga"
- 2005: "Culebra"
- 2005: "Chévere" (feat. Notch)
- 2006: "Claro de Luna"
- 2006: "Let's Go To My Crib" (feat. Jowell & Randy)
- 2007: "Los Capo" (feat. Ñejo & Dalmata, Guelo Star, Zion, De La Ghetto, Syko, Héctor el Father & Jowell & Randy)
- 2007: "El Mellao"
- 2008: "Pónmela" (feat. Jowell & Randy)
- 2008: "Un Amor Como Tú" (feat. Arcángel)
- 2009: "Esto Es A Palo"
- 2009: "Dimelo Mami"
- 2009: "Dimelo Mami (Remix)" (feat.Daddy Yankee)
- 2009: "Tumba El Piquete" (feat.J-Alvarez)
- 2012: "La Kiebra nuka remix" (feat.Mr. Pelón (503))
- 2014: "Siempre Estoy" (feat. Ñengo Flow)

=== Guest appearances ===
- 1993: "No Te Canses, El Funeral" Daddy Yankee (feat. Voltio)
- 1998: "Muévela" DJ Dicky (feat. Voltio)
- 2003: "Mi Libertad" (feat. Jerry Rivera)
- 2004: "12 Discípulos" (Eddie Dee feat. Daddy Yankee, Tego Calderon, Ivy Queen, Zion & Lennox, Vico C, Nicky Jam, Voltio, Gallego, Wiso G and Johhny Prez)
- 2005: "En Este Infierno" K-Narias (feat. Voltio)
- 2005: "Amor de Una Noche" (feat. N'Klabe)
- 2005: "So Amazing" Jagged Edge (feat. Voltio)
- 2006: "Lo Que Son Las Cosas (Reggaeton Version)" Anaís (feat. Voltio)
- 2006: "En Mi Puertorro" Andy Montañez (feat. Voltio)
- 2006: "Abusando Del Genero" DJ Joe (feat. Yomo, Voltio, Trebol Clan, Zion & Lennox, Tempo)
- 2006: "Mil Caminos" Leonor (feat. Voltio)
- 2006: "Payaso" Tego Calderón (feat. Voltio & Eddie Dee)
- 2006: "Gansta" Baby Ranks (feat. Voltio)
- 2006: "Llegaron Los Rebuleros" Maestro (feat. Voltio)
- 2007: "Ella Volvió" (feat. N'Klabe)
- 2007: "Dale Mami Damelo" DJ Nelson (feat. Voltio)
- 2007: "Lo Hecho Hecho Esta" Tego Calderón (feat. Pirulo, Voltio, Ñejo, Chyno Nyno)
- 2007: "Get Me Bodied" Beyoncé (feat. Voltio)
- 2007: "Si Me Matan" Alexis & Fido (feat. Lapiz Conciente, Luis Vargas, Voltio, De La Ghetto, Jadiel, Primer Mandatario & Sofla)
- 2007: "Easy" Don Omar (feat. Zion, Voltio, Eddie Dee, Tego Calderón & Cosculluela)
- 2008: "Don't Stay Away from the Sunlight" Turbulence (feat. Voltio)
- 2008: "Levántate" J-King & Maximan (feat. Voltio, Guelo Star)
- 2008: "Na De Na (Remix)" Angel & Khriz (feat. John Eric, Gocho, Alexis, Voltio, Arcángel, & Franco "El Gorila")
- 2008: "Ella Menea (Remix)" NG2
- 2010: "Hipnótika" A.B. Quintanilla Y Los Kumbia All Starz (feat. Voltio and Marciano Cantero from Los Enanitos Verdes)
- 2012: "Ella Lo Que Quiere Es Salsa" (Víctor Manuelle (feat. Voltio and Jowell & Randy)

== Filmography ==
- 2008: Feel The Noise as himself
- 2009: Talento de Barrio as himself
- TBA: Julito Maraña
