= Moctezuma (album) =

Studio album by Porter
- Released: March 30, 2015
- Genre: Experimental rock; indie rock; alternative rock; dream pop
- Length: 40:55
- Label: LOV/RECS
- Producer: Didi Gutman; Hector Castillo

Porter chronology
Atemahawke (2007)	Moctezuma (2015)	Las Batallas del Tiempo (2018)

Singles from Moctezuma
- 1. "Palapa" Released: April 1, 2014; 2. "Huitzil" Released: March 3, 2015; 3. "Rincón Yucateco" Released: September 28, 2015; 4. "La China" Released: June 14, 2016

Moctezuma is the second studio album by Mexican indie rock band Porter. The album's name means "lord of lords" in the Nahuatl language while the songs tell the story of Spaniards arriving to Mexico and the fall of the Aztec Empire and the Mexica people.

This is the band's first album with vocalist David Velasco and the last with drummer Juan Pablo Vázquez.

== Background and release ==
Porter's debut studio album, Atemahawke, was released in May 2007. The album received positive reviews and became popular due to the single "Host of a Ghost". The group performed the song at the 2008 Coachella Festival with Natalia Lafourcade. Shortly after the Coachella performance, the band went on hiatus and disbanded as vocalist Juan Son started a solo career while the other members focused on finishing their education. The band announced they would be reforming when the lineup for the 2013 Vive Latino music festival was released. The band reformed with vocalist David Velasco, with Juan Son not performing with the reunited lineup for unknown reasons.

Four music videos were released to promote the album: "Palapa", "Huitzil", "Rincón Yucateco" and "La China". The narrative of the videos center around the lyrics and themes of the album.

== Reception ==
Moctezuma was placed at number 10 on Rolling Stone's 10 Best Latin Albums of 2015.

== Track listing ==
All tracks are written by Porter

No.	Title	Length
1.	"Murciélago" (Bat)	4:34
2.	"M Bosque" (Mexican Wood)	6:00
3.	"Huitzil"	4:04
4.	"La China" (The Pebble)	5:42
5.	"Rincón Yucateco" (Yucatan Corner)	4:32
6.	"Huracancún"	5:23
7.	"Tzunami" (Tsunami)	4:58
8.	"Palapa" (Palm Roof)	5:42

== Personnel ==
Porter

- David Velasco – vocals
- Victor Valverde – guitar, synthesizer, piano
- Fernando de la Huerta – guitar
- Diego Rangel – bass, synthesizer
- Juan Pablo Vázquez – drums

Additional

- Produced by Didi Gutman and Hector Castillo
- Artwork by Christopher Houweling
