= Otra Cosa =

Studio album by Julieta Venegas
- Released: March 16, 2010
- Recorded: 2009
- Studios: Julieta Venegas' House (Mexico City, Mexico); Mondomix (Buenos Aires, Argentina)
- Genres: Latin pop; folk rock; alternative pop; pop rock
- Length: 38:02; 43.69 (LP)
- Language: Spanish
- Label: Sony Latin
- Producers: Julieta Venegas and Cachorro López

Julieta Venegas chronology
MTV Unplugged (2008)	Otra Cosa (2010)	Los Momentos (2013)

Singles from Otra Cosa
- 1. "Bien o mal" Released: January 15, 2010; 2. "Despedida" Released: May 11, 2010; 3. "Ya Conocerán" Released: March 9, 2011

Professional ratings
Review scores
Source	Rating
AllMusic	4/5 stars
Los Angeles Times	3/4 stars

Otra Cosa ("Something Else") is the fifth studio album by Mexican singer-songwriter Julieta Venegas, released worldwide on March 16, 2010. iTunes sold two versions of this album, the standard version and an iTunes LP, and it became the first iTunes LP released by a Latin artist. The deluxe iTunes release includes the music video for the single "Bien o Mal," as well as a remix by the Mexican Institute of Sound. The album was also released exclusively in Mexico in format of vinyl.

This album features collaborations with Alejandro Sergi (vocals from Miranda!) and Adrián Dárgelos (vocals from Babasónicos). The first single chosen to promote the album was the song "Bien o Mal," which topped the popularity in Mexican radio and in Latin America.

In Mexico, Otra Cosa sold 30,000 copies. Won the Latin Grammy Award for Best Short Form Music Video. The album received a Grammy Award nomination for Best Latin Pop Album.

== Background ==
On this album Julieta Venegas served not only as a singer-songwriter but also as a producer. She directed each of the processes and the song selection, choice and management arrangements. For Otra Cosa, Venegas used the sounds of acoustic and electric guitars, synthesizers, many percussion instruments, cavaquinhos, woodwinds, pianos and accordions ever. As for the composition and subsequent recording of the album, it said on her official blog: "Both the composition and the arrangements began to assemble at home, composing on the piano, and then up the music room I have, where I started recording with the idea of trying things, many of those things ended up being on disk, which I love, because it was something very homely, not thinking about the pressure of study, but in the quiet of my house. Not that I have a big studio, I have to clarify basic only pro tools, and many instruments this time came many cavaquinhos, percussion, synthesizers, accordion with many effects, drum machines, in short, the development of ideas was something I did in solitude, and sometimes forgetting that it was preparing a disc. I came to write about 40 songs, among which I did in my house, and later in Buenos Aires, where I got together to compose Ale Sergi (Miranda!), Adrian Dargelos (Babasónicos ).... I wanted to write with other people, after be at home one time, it was refreshing to see what could come to sit with friends, both Ale and Adrian are very friendly and have been wanting to do things together, and now it happened."

== Promotion ==
To promote the album, Julieta Venegas began her "Otra Cosa Tour" in several cities in Mexico and the United States like the presentation at the Vive Latino of México City. At the same time she traveled to several countries in Latin America and Europe for media presentations.

After her pregnancy, she began the second part of her world "Otra Cosa Tour" on November 20, 2010 in Madrid, Spain. She went on to continue the "Otra Cosa U.S. Tour" in several U.S. cities, Latin America, Brazil and Europe before she returned to the United States and Mexico.

=== Singles ===
The first single from the album was "Bien o Mal" released on January 18, 2010, via digital download. In Mexico it reached No. 5 on the charts and in Spain No. 45. It was No. 8 on the US Latin Pop Airplay, No. 21 on US Hot Latin Tracks, and No. 40 for US Tropical Songs. "Despedida" was released on May 11, 2010 in Mexico, Latin America and Europe, and ranked No. 35 on the Billboard Latin Pop Airplay. On March 9, 2011, Venegas released the third single, "Ya Conocerán" as announced by Sony Music Chile.

== Track listing ==
No.	Title	Writer(s)	Producer(s)	Length
1.	"Amores Platónicos (Platonic Love)"	Julieta Venegas	Julieta Venegas, Cachorro López	2:34
2.	"Bien o Mal (Good or Wrong)"	Venegas, Alejandro Sergi	Venegas, López	2:57
3.	"Despedida (Farewell)"	Venegas	Venegas, López	3:23
4.	"Debajo de Mi Lengua (Underneath My Tongue)"	Venegas, Adrián Dárgelos	Venegas, López	2:38
5.	"Revolución (Revolution)"	Venegas	Venegas, López	3:23
6.	"Otra Cosa (Another Thing)"	Venegas	Venegas, López	2:39
7.	"Original (Original)"	Venegas	Venegas, López	3:50
8.	"Ya Conocerán (They Will Know)"	Venegas	Venegas, López	3:13
9.	"Duda (Doubt)"	Venegas	Venegas, López	3:34
10.	"Si Tú No Estás (If You Aren't There)"	Venegas	Venegas, López	3:02
11.	"Un Lugar (A Place)"	Venegas	Venegas, López	3:04
12.	"Eterno (Eternal)"	Venegas	Venegas, López	3:45

iTunes Bonus Tracks
No.	Title	Writer(s)	Producer(s)	Length
13.	"Bien o Mal" (Mexican Institute of Sound Remix)	Venegas, Sergi, Cachorro López	Venegas, López, Mexican Institute of Sound	3:12
14.	"Bien o Mal" (Video)			2:55

Otra Cosa Más – EP (Walmart Exclusive)(only US)

- "Bien o mal"
- "Despedida"
- "Debajo de Mi Lengua"
- "Me Voy"
- "Andar Conmigo"
- "Limón y Sal"

== Personnel ==
- Julieta Venegas – vocals, background vocals, accordion, piano, glockenspiel, keyboards, acoustic guitar, electric guitar, cavaquinho, banjo, xylophone, ukulele, Fender Rhodes, melodion, percussions, handclaps, programming
- Cachorro López – bass guitar, programming, claps
- Dany Avila – drums, percussion
- Alejandro "Ale" Sergi – background vocals
- Demian Nava – programming, percussions
- Sebastian Schon – flute, tenor saxophone, handclaps, background vocals, programming
- Mono Huarto – double bass
- Santiago Castellani – tuba
- Leo Heras – clarinet
- Juan Carlos de Urquiza – trumpet
- Ana Schon, Ana Piñero, Lola Piñero, Valentino Ohanian – background vocals
- Daniel Melingo – Bouzuki
- Juan Blas Caballero – programming, percussion
- Sandra Baylac – claps, background vocals
- Patricio Villarejo – Cello
- Florencia Ciarlo – background vocals

=== Production ===
- Producers: Julieta Venegas, Cachorro López
- Engineers: Sebastián Schon, Julieta Venegas, Demian Nava
- Mixing: Cesar Sogbe
- Mastering: José Blanco
- Photography: Nora Lezano
- Design assistant: Silvia Canosa
- Design: Alejandro Ros

== Charts and certifications ==
=== Weekly charts ===
Chart	Peak position
Argentine Albums (CAPIF)	3
Greek Albums (IFPI)	29
Mexican Albums (Top 100 México)	12
Spanish Albums (PROMUSICAE)	19
Swiss Albums (Schweizer Hitparade)	19
US Top Latin Albums (Billboard)	5
US Latin Pop Albums (Billboard)	3

=== Certifications ===
Region	Certification	Certified units/sales
Mexico (AMPROFON)	Gold	30,000^{^}
^{^} Shipments figures based on certification alone.

=== Year-end charts ===
Chart (2010)	Position
Mexican Albums (Top 100 México)	94

== Awards ==
Grammy Awards

Year	Nominee / work	Award	Result
2010	Otra Cosa	Best Latin Pop Album	Nominated

Latin Grammy Awards

Year	Nominee / work	Award	Result
2010	Bien o Mal	Best Short Form Music	Won
