= Latin Grammy Award for Best Short Form Music Video =

Latin Grammy Award category

- Awarded for: quality short form music videos
- Country: United States
- Presented by: The Latin Recording Academy
- First award: 2000
- Currently held by: Ca7riel & Paco Amoroso for "#Tetas" (2025)
- Website: LatinGrammy.com

The Latin Grammy Award for Best Short Form Music Video is an honor presented annually at the Latin Grammy Awards, a ceremony that recognizes excellence and creates a wider awareness of cultural diversity and contributions of Latin recording artists in the United States and internationally. The award has been given since the 1st Latin Grammy Awards in 2000 to artists, directors and producers of an individual promotional music video released for the first time during the award eligibility year.

"No Me Dejes de Querer", performed by Gloria Estefan and directed by Emilio Estefan, was the first music video to be win the award. They were followed by Ricky Martin for the video "She Bangs". Shakira's "Suerte" was also awarded, and the recipient of the first Video of the Year award at the MTV Video Music Awards Latinoamérica. The English-language version of the video received four nominations at the MTV Video Music Awards of 2002. The music video for the bilingual track "Frijolero" by Mexican band Molotov, that employs animation software previously developed by the directors Jason Archer and Paul Beck for the American film Waking Life, received the award in 2003.

Puerto-Rican band Calle 13 holds the record for the most wins as an ensemble in this category with four (out of seven nominations), "Atrévete-te-te", "La Perla", "Calma Pueblo" and "Ojos Color Sol"; by virtue of his lead performance with Calle 13 and three additional victories as a solo artist, Residente is the category biggest winner with seven accolades. Colombian singer-songwriter Juanes has been awarded three times for the music videos for "Volverte a Ver", "Me Enamora", and "Pa'Dentro". Gabriel Coss and Carlos R. Pérez hold the record for the most wins as directors, with a total of two each. Guatemalan singer Ricardo Arjona and Argentinean band Babasónicos hold the record for the most nominations without a win, with three each.

== Recipient ==
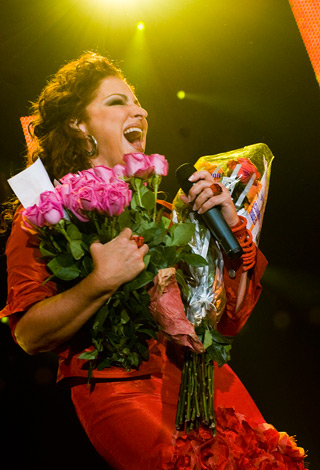
Cuban-American Gloria Estefan was the inaugural winner of the category in 2000 for "No Me Dejes de Querer".

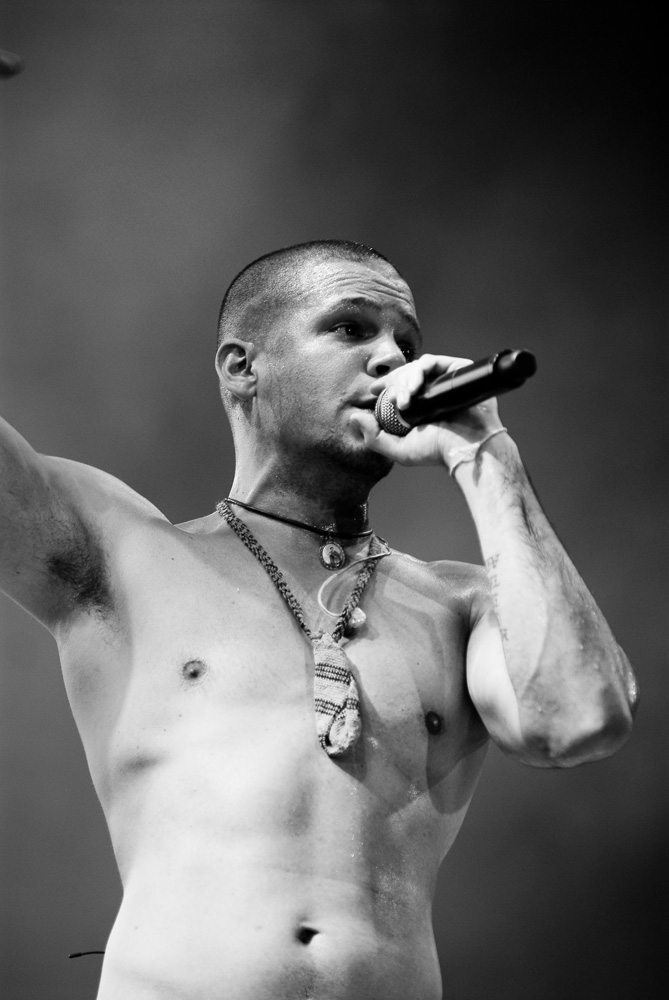
Puerto Rican singer René Pérez (Residente) of the band Calle 13 has won seven times in the category, four times as a part of the band and three as a solo artist.

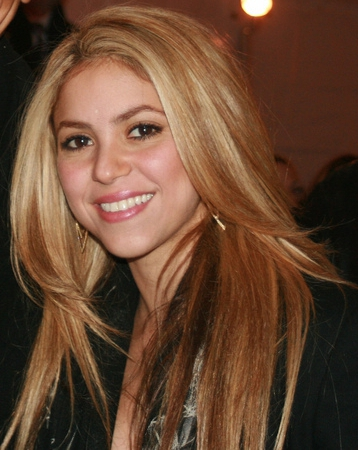
2002 winner, Colombian singer Shakira

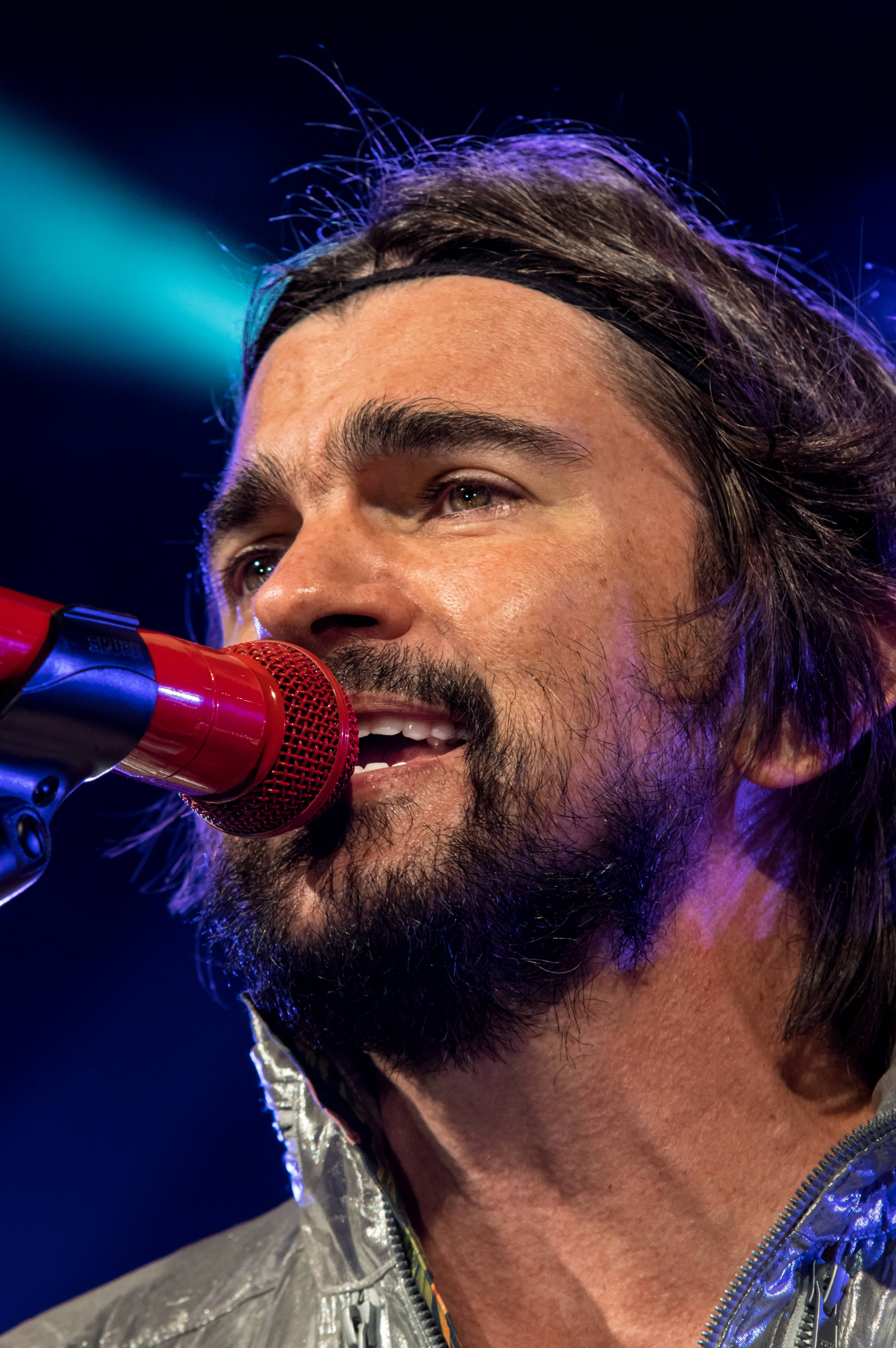
Colombian singer-songwriter Juanes received the award in 2005, 2008 and 2018.

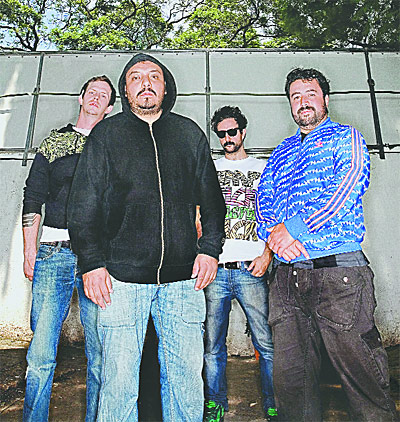
Mexican rock band Molotov won the award in 2003.

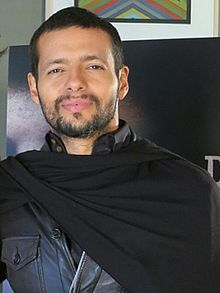
2004 winner Draco Rosa.

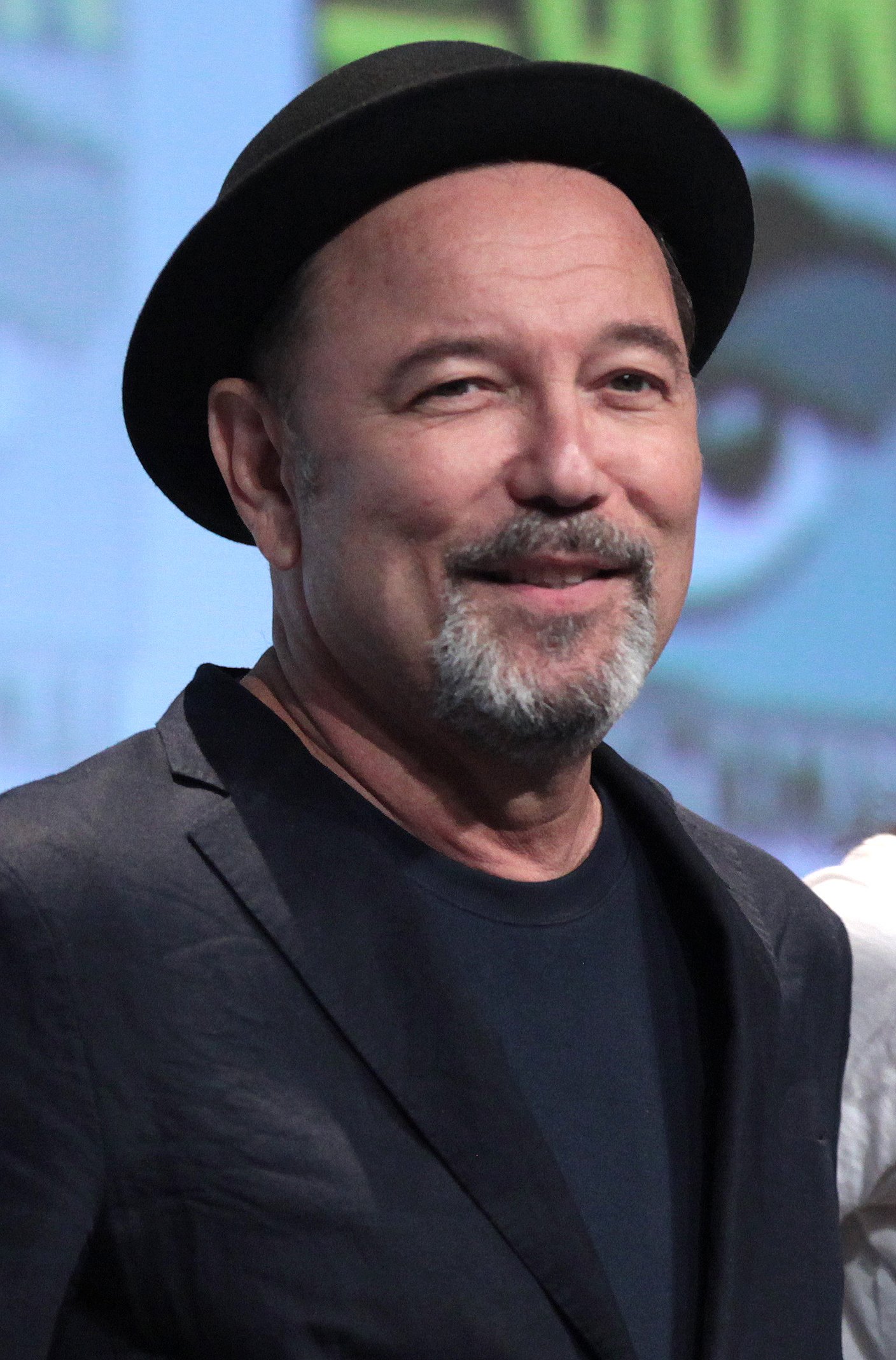
Panamanian singer Rubén Blades won alongside Calle 13 in 2009.

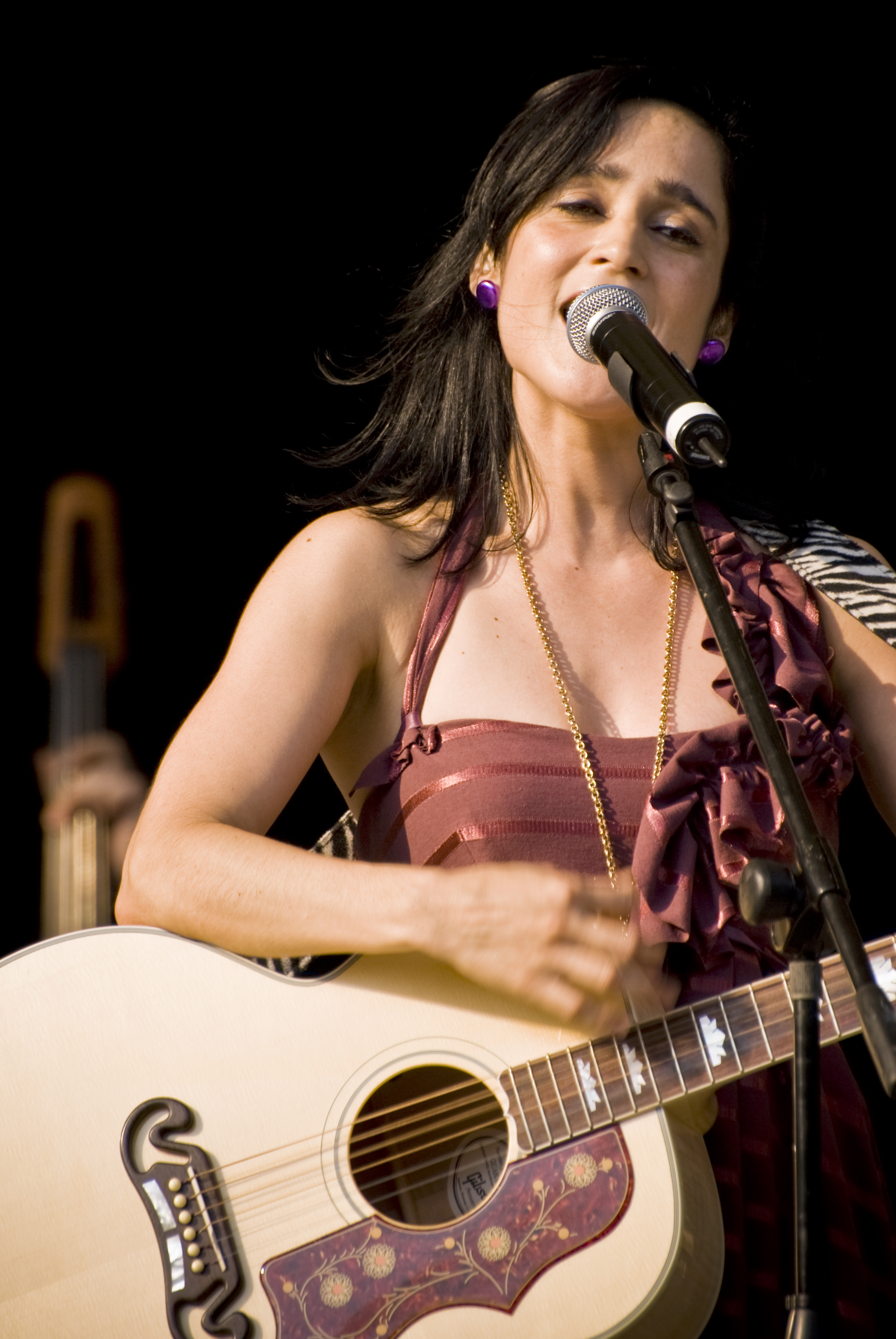
2010 winner, Mexican singer Julieta Venegas

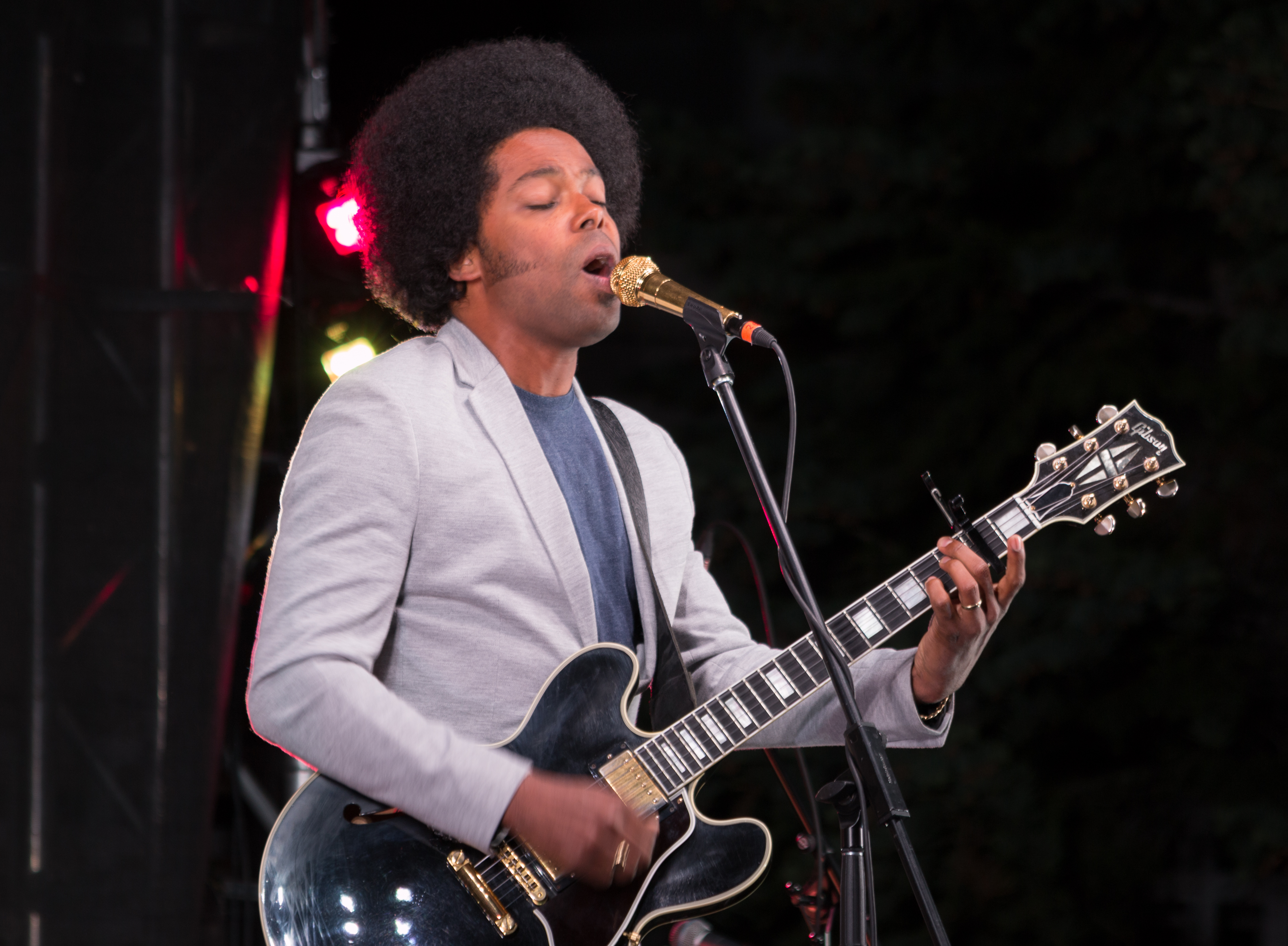
Cuban-Canadian singer Alex Cuba won the award in 2013.

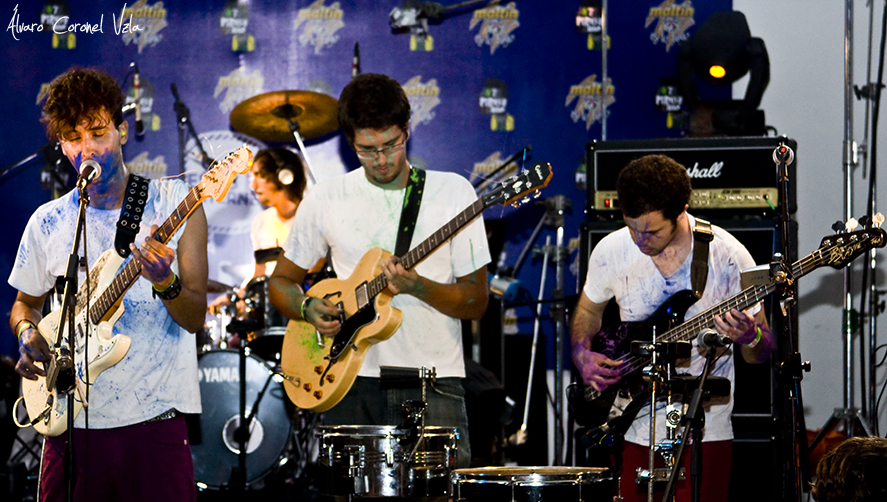
Venezuelan alternative band La Vida Bohème won the award in 2014.

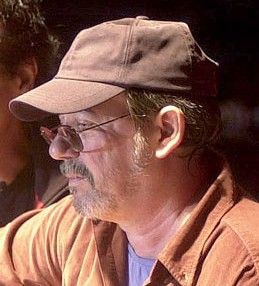
Cuban musician Silvio Rodríguez won in 2015 alongside Calle 13.

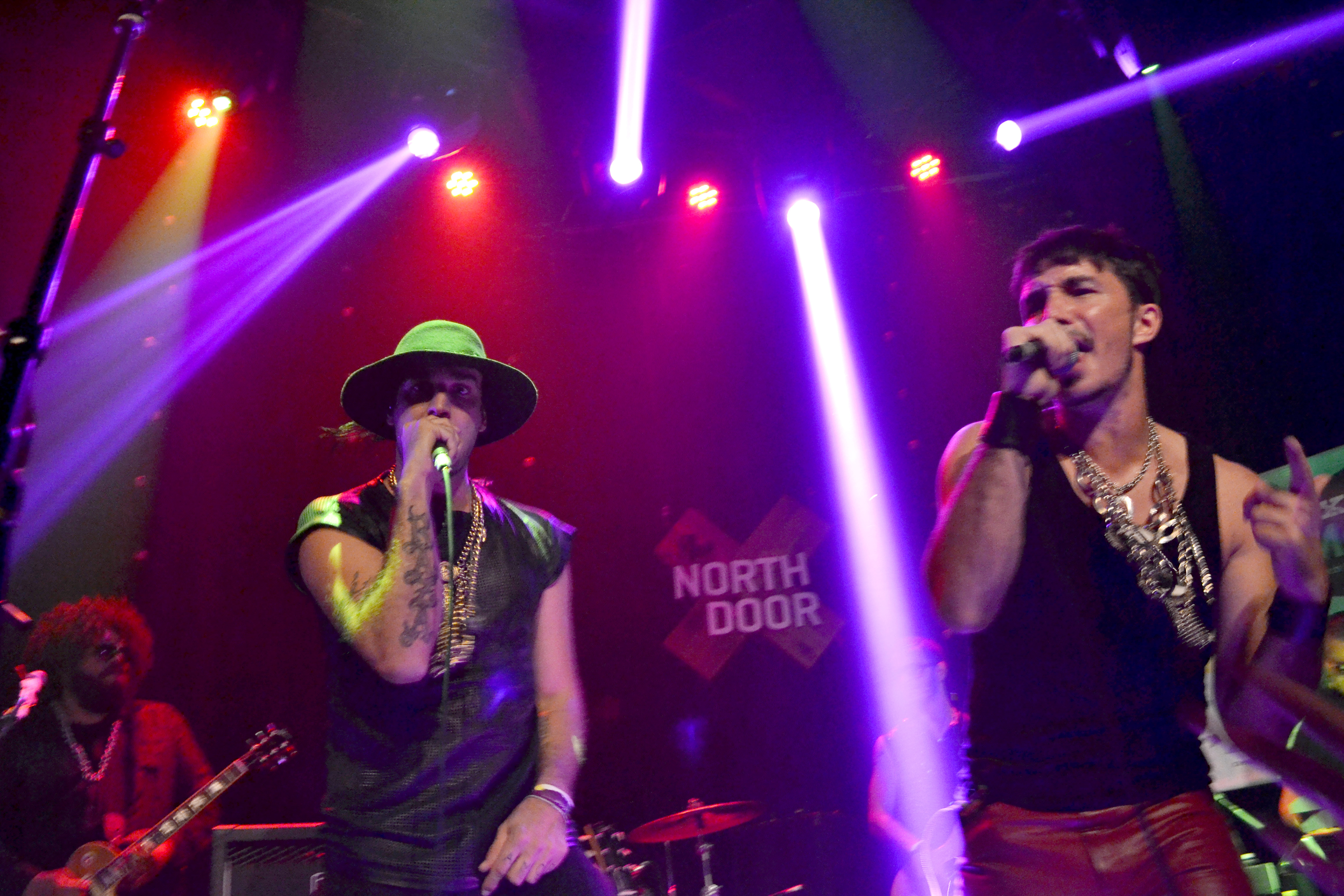
Argentine duo Illya Kuryaki and the Valderramas won the award in 2016.

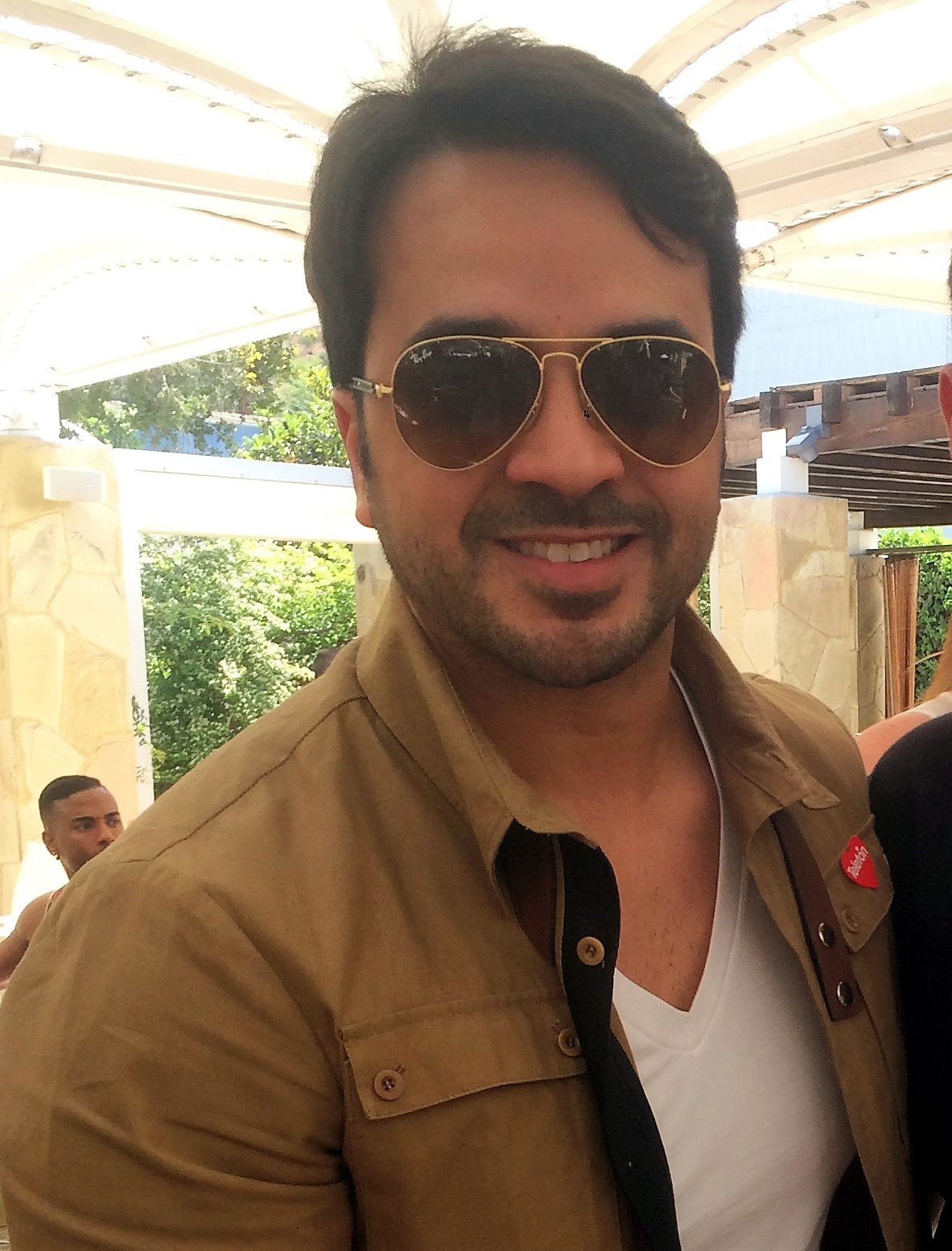
Puerto Rican singer Luis Fonsi won in 2017 with Daddy Yankee.

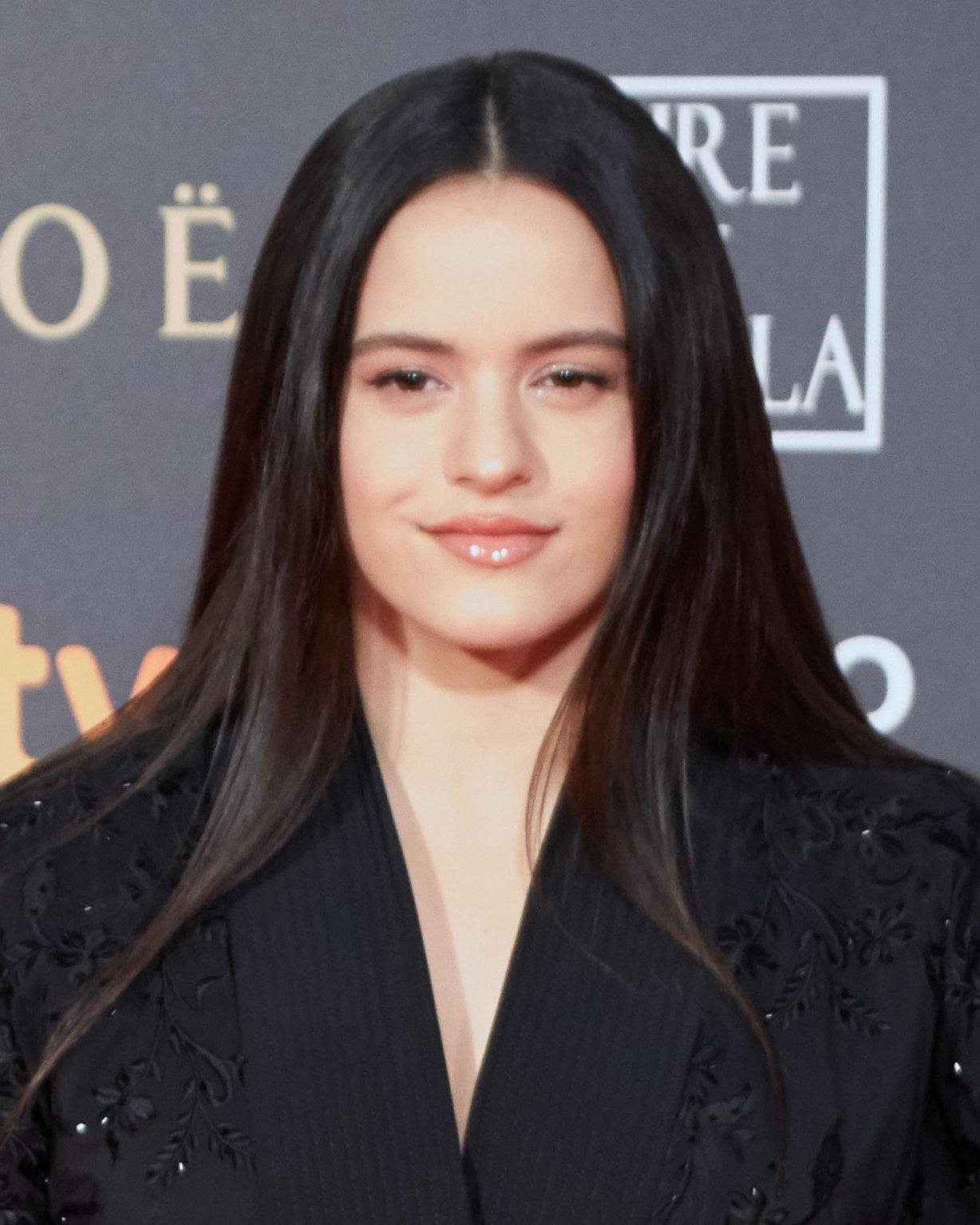
Spanish singer Rosalía won the award with American rapper Travis Scott in 2020.

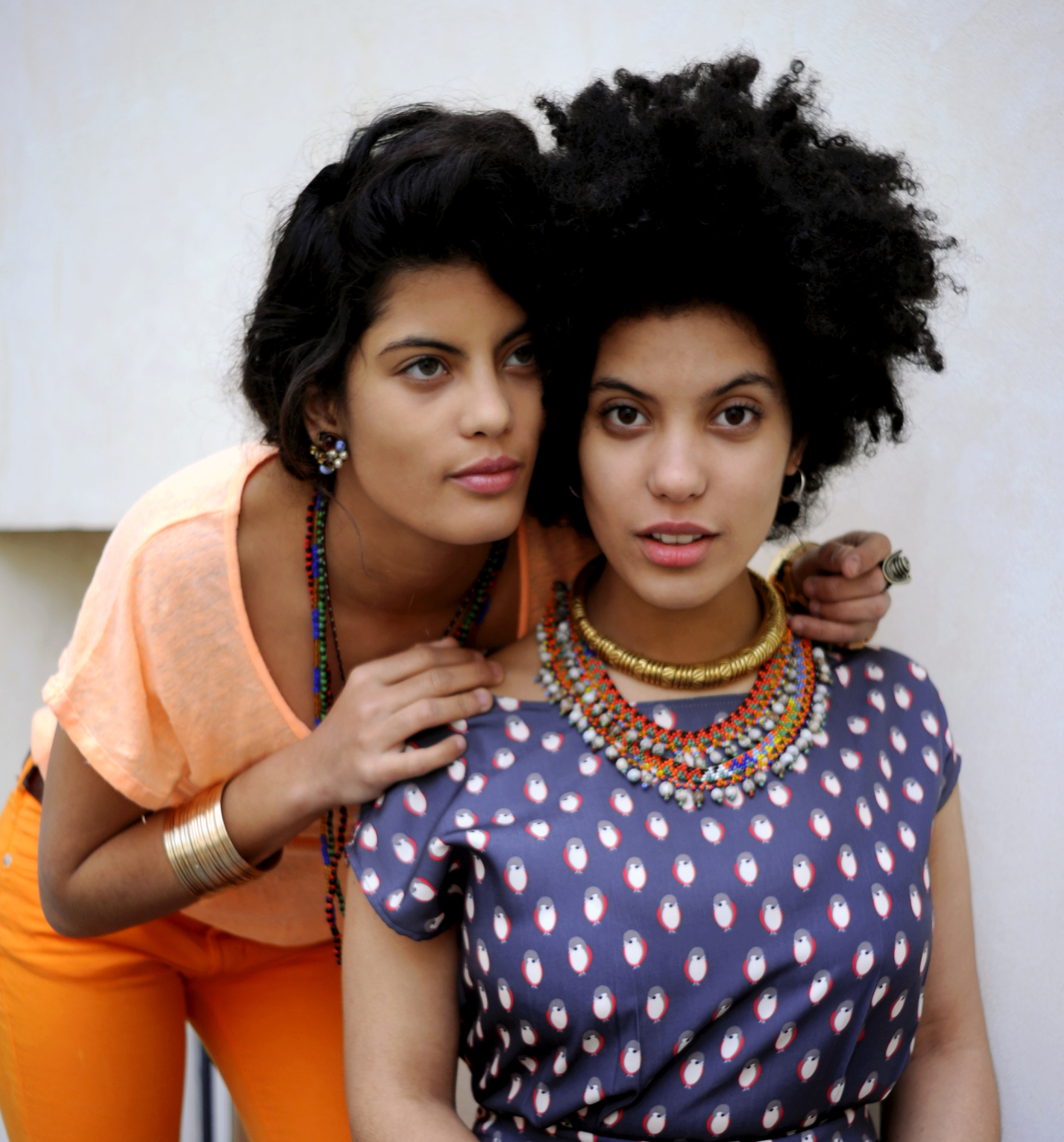
French duo Ibeyi won in 2022 alongside Residente.

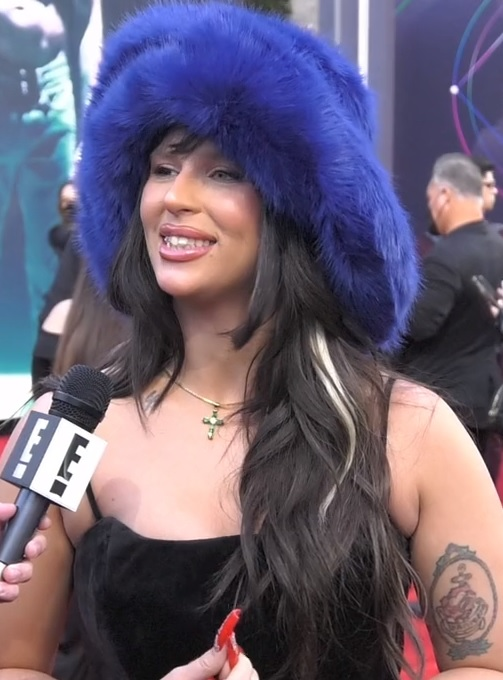
Argentine singer Nathy Peluso won the award in 2023.

Year	Work(s)	Performing artist(s)	Director(s) and Producer(s)	Nominees	Ref.
2000	"No Me Dejes de Querer"	Gloria Estefan	Emilio Estefan, director; Douglas Friedman, producer	Los Fabulosos Cadillacs – "La Vida" (José Luis García and Padula, producers, José Luis García, director); La Ley – "Aquí" (Edy Enriquez, producer; Beto Cuevas and Gustavo Garzón, directors); Jennifer Lopez and Marc Anthony – "No Me Ames" (Rhonda Vernet, producer; Kevin Bray, director); Shakira – "Ojos Así" (Nyenye Kitchings, producer; Mark Kohr, director)	
2001	"She Bangs"	Ricky Martin	Wayne Isham, director; Jil Hardin and Dana Marshall, producers	Juanes – "Fíjate Bien" (Simon Brand, director; Nathalie Osma, producer); La Oreja de Van Gogh – "París" (Manolo Gil, director); Fito Páez – "El Diablo de Tu Corazón" (Agulla and Baccetti, director; Phil Ramone, producer); Os Paralamas do Sucesso – "Aonde Quer Que Eu Vá" (Gualter Pupo and Andrucha Waddington, directors); Alejandro Sanz – "Cuando Nadie Me Ve" (Sebastien Grousset, director; Tesauro, producer)	
2002	"Suerte"	Shakira	Francis Lawrence, director; Tim Kerrison, producer	Celia Cruz – "La Negra Tiene Tumbao" (Ernesto Fundora, director and producer); Juanes – "A Dios le Pido" (Gustavo Garzón, director; Cecilia Sagredo, producer); Paulina Rubio – "Yo No Soy Esa Mujer" (Gustavo Garzon, director and producer); Carlos Vives – "Déjame Entrar" (Oscar Azula, director; RCN Comerciales, producer)	
2003	"Frijolero"	Molotov	Jason Archer and Paul Beck, directors; Kathee Schneider, producer	Ricardo Arjona – "El Problema" (Daniel Gruener, director; Daniel Gruener, producer); Chayanne – "Torero" (Pablo Croce, director; María Inés Vélez, producer); Roberto Frejat – "Segredos" (Renan De Moraes, Leonardo Teixeira and Mauricio Vidal, directors; Marcelo Vidal, producer); Jarabe de Palo – "Bonito" (Andre Cruz, director; Oviedo, producer)	
2004	"Más y Más"	Robi Draco Rosa	Angela Alvarado Rosa, director; Maryann Tanedo, producer	Café Tacvba – "Eres" (Rodrigo Váldez, director; Rogelio Sirander, producer); Kevin Johansen – "La Procesión" (Picky Talarico, director and producer); Molotov – "Hit Me" (Jason Archer and Paul Beck, directors; Kathee Schneider, producer); Roselyn Sánchez – "Amor, Amor" (Pablo Croce, director and producer)	
2005	"Volverte a Ver"	Juanes	Gustavo Garzón, director; Cecilia Sagredo, producer	La Ley – "Mírate" (Gustavo Garzon, video director; Sweet Dreams, producer); Molotov – "Amateur" (Rogelio Sikander, director; The Maestros, producer); Aleks Syntek – "A Veces Fuí" (Esteban Madrazo, director; Mediamates, producer); Vicentico – "Los Caminos de la Vida" (Pucho Mentasti, director and producer)	
2006	"Atrévete-te-te"	Calle 13	Jorge "Fish" Rodríguez and Gabriel Coss, director; María Estades, producer	Ricardo Arjona featuring Intocable – "Mojado" (Simon Brand, video director; Omar Catalán and Andrea De Moral, producers); Chayanne – "Te Echo de Menos" (Gustavo Garzón, director; Cecy Sagredo, producer); Shakira featuring Alejandro Sanz – "La Tortura" (Michael Haussman, director; Nina Huang, producer); Julieta Venegas – "Me Voy" (Picky Talarico, director; Gerardo Vallina, producer)	
2007	"Ven a Mi Casa Esta Navidad"	Voz Veis	Luis Miguel Leal, director; Jorge Barboza, producer	Calle 13 – "Tango del Pecado" (Gabriel Coss and Israel Lugo, directors; Reaktor Post and Transfer, producers); Kevin Johansen – "Anoche Soñé Contigo" (Claudio Divella, director and producer); Maná – "Labios Compartidos" (Pablo Crocce, director; Felipe Niño, producer); Orishas – "Hay Un Son" (Edouard Salier, director; Laurent Rodriguez-Sotelino, producer)	
2008	"Me Enamora"	Juanes	Aggressive, director; JP Fox, producer	Babasónicos – "Pijamas" (Agustín Alberdi, director; Juan Taylor, producer); Bajofondo – "Pa' Bailar" (Pablo Casacuberta, director; Laura Gutman, producer); Manu Chao – "Me Llaman Calle" (Fernando León de Aranoa, director and producer); Molotov – "Yofo" (Rita Marimen, director; Andrés Martínez, producer)	
2009	"La Perla"	Calle 13 featuring Rubén Blades	Gabriel Coss and Israel Lugo, directors; Rojo Chiringa, producer	Ricardo Arjona – "Como Duele" (Ricardo Calderón, director and producer); Babasónicos – "Las Demás" (Luigi Ghidotti, director; Peluca Films, producer); Bebe – "Me Fuí" (Juan Pablo Eniz and Javier Gesto, directors; Struendo, producer); Zoé – "Reptilectric" (Rogelio Sikander, director; The Maestros, producer)	
2010	"Bien o Mal"	Julieta Venegas	Agustín Alberdi, video director; Nicolas Cabuche, video producer	Ádammo – "Algún Día" (Percy Céspedez, video director; Percy Céspedez & Alexei Vásquez, video producers); El Cuarteto de Nos – "El Hijo de Hernández" (Charly Gutierrez, video director; Oriental Films, video producer); Juan Luis Guerra – "Bachata en Fukuoka" (Simon Brand, video director; Mauricio Osorio, video producer); Joaquín Sabina – "Viudita de Clicquot" (Rafa Sañudo, video director and producer)	
2011	"Calma Pueblo"	Calle 13	Alejandro Santiago Ciena, video director and video producer	Alexander Acha – "Amiga" (Esteban Madrazo, video director; Ricardo Gascón, video producer); Franco De Vita featuring Alejandra Guzmán – "Tan Sólo Tú" (Diego Álvarez, video director; Vicente Solís, video producer); Maná – "Lluvia al Corazón" (Hydra, video director; Eric Berkowitz, video producer); Ricky Martin featuring Natalia Jiménez – "Lo Mejor de Mi Vida Eres Tú" (Carlos Perez, video director; Felipe Niño, video producer); Shakira – "Loca" (Jaume De Laiguana, video director; Pablo Martinez & Gloria Marzabal, video producers)	
2012	"Me Voy"	Jesse & Joy	Carlos López Estrada, video director; Christian Heuer, video producer	Catupecu Machu – "Metrópolis Nueva" (Javier Vázquez, video director; Catupecu Machu, video producer); Georgina – "Rara" (Daniel Etura, video director; Daniel Etura and Zoca Morend, video producers); Nevilton – "Tempos de Maracujá" (Edson Oda, video director; Edson Oda, video producer); Rakel – "En el Tiempo" (O'Brien Llontop, video director; Catalina Aristizabal and Danny Pinzón, video producers)	
2013	"Eres Tú"	Alex Cuba	Christian Bielz, video director; Taylor Fox, video producer	Famasloop – "Más Cerquita" (Marcel Rasquín, video director; Joe Torres and Juan Antonio Díaz, video producers); Jotdog – "Corazón de Metal" (Ricardo Herrer, video director; Horacio Ortega, video producer); Illya Kuryaki and the Valderramas – "Ula Ula" (Luciano Benjamín Cieza, video director; Hernán Corera and Sebastián Sutton, video producers); Leiva – "Vis a Vis" (Titán Pozo, video director; Mario Fornés, video producer)	
2014	"Flamingo"	La Vida Bohème	Leonardo González, video director; Carl Zitelmann, Debbie Crosscup and César Elster, video producers	Babasónicos – "La Lanza" (Juan Cabral, video director; Stephen Johnson, Mjz London and Nicci Power, video producers); Calle 13 – "Adentro" (Kacho López Mari, video director; Cynthia González and Tristina Robles, video producers); Nach – "Me Llaman" (Javier Gutiérrez, video director; Javier Gutiérrez, video producer); Zoé – "Arrullo de Estrellas" (León Larregui, video director; Pablo García Gatterer, video producer)	
2015	"Ojos Color Sol"	Calle 13 featuring Silvio Rodríguez	Kacho López, video director; Marcelo Fontao and Tristana Robles, video producers	Willbert Álvarez – "Te Busqué" (Daniel Gómez Etura, video director; Willbert Álvarez, María Carrasco, Germán Gutiérrez Ross & Nerio Gutiérrez Ross, video producers); Calle 13 – "Así de Grandes Son las Ideas" (Quique Rivera Rivera, video director; Quique Rivera Rivera, video producer); El Cuarteto de Nos – "No Llora" (Diego Tucci, video director; Refugio Films, video producer); Porter – "Huitzil" (Jorge González Camarena, video director)	
2016	"Gallo Negro"	Illya Kuryaki & The Valderramas	Hernán Corera, video director and video producer	Álex Anwandter – "Siempre Es Viernes En Mi Corazón" (Alex Anwandter, video director; Sergio Alvarado, video producer); Gustavo Casas y Los Que Buscan – "Verte Ya" (Adolfo Bueno, video director; Esther Padial, video producer); Delafé – "Lo Más Bonito del Mundo" (Delafé, video director and video producer); El Guincho featuring Mala Rodríguez – "Comix" (CANADA, video director and video producer)	
2017	"Despacito"	Luis Fonsi featuring Daddy Yankee	Carlos R. Perez, video director; Joanna Egozcue and Camila Agerskov, video producers	Bomba Estéreo – "Soy Yo" (Torben Kjelstrup, video director; The Woerks, video producer); Leiva – "Sincericido" (Zip, video director; Blur Films, video producer); Dani Martín – "Los Charcos" (Daniel Etura, video director; Wonder, video producer); Residente featuring SoKo – "Desencuentro" (René Pérez Joglar, video director; Adiela Marie, video producer)	
2018	"Pa'Dentro"	Juanes	Lionel Hirle and Grégory Ohrel, video directors; Bret Rea and Jocelyn Webber, video producers	Bomba Estéreo – "Duele" (Sam Mason, video director; Talia Bernstein, video producer); Residente & Dillon Francis featuring ILE – "Sexo" (Residente, video director; Adiela Marie, video producer); Residente – "Guerra" (Adiela Marie, video director; Residente, video producer); Rosalía – "Malamente" (CANADA, video director and video producer)	
2019	"Banana Papaya"	Kany García & Residente	Residente, video director; Stephanie "Tuty" Correa, video producer	Criolo – "Boca de Lobo" (Denis Cisma and Pedro Inoue, video directors; Beatriz Berjeaut, video producer); Nego do Borel & DJ Rennan da Penha – "Me Solta" (Lucas Romor, video director; KondZilla, video producer); Nach – "Los Zurdos Mueren Antes" (Willy Rodriguez, video director and video producer); Todo Aparenta Normal – "Vivir Los Colores" (Mariano Dawidson, video director; Eric Dawidson, video producer)	
2020	"TKN"	Rosalía and Travis Scott	CANADA, video director; Oscar Romagosa and Laura Serra Estorch, video producers	BaianaSystem & Tropkillaz – "Saci (Remix)" (Rafael Kent, video director; Tânia Assumpção and Rafael Marquez, video producers); J Balvin – "Rojo" (Colin Tilley, video director; Jamee Ranta, video producer); Bivolt – "Cubana" (Gabriel Augusto & Quemuel Cornelius, video directors; Francesco Civita and Henrique Danieletto, video producers); Porter – "Para Ya" (Alexis Gómez, video director; Michelle Lacoste, video producer)	
2021	"Un Amor Eterno"	Marc Anthony	Carlos R. Pérez, video director; Maricel Zambrano, video producer	BaianaSystem featuring BNegão – "Reza Forte" (Belle De Melo, video director; Marcelo Cintra, video producer); Fuel Fandango featuring María José Llergo – "Mi Huella" (Alex Gargot, video director; Alberto Tortes Catelló, video producer); Fran, Carlos Do Complexo and Bibi Caetano – "Visceral" (Pedro Alvarenga, video director; Marcos Araújo and Bernardo Portella, video producers); Selena Gomez – "De Una Vez" (Los Pérez, video director; Kim Dellara and Clark Jackson, video producers)	
2022	"This is Not America"	Residente featuring Ibeyi (Lisa-Kaindé Diaz and Naomi Diaz)	Greg Ohrel, video director; Jason Cole, Corinna Martínez and Barbarella Pardo, video producers	Cami – "Mía" (Nuno Gomes, video director; Mona Moreno Fernández and Ada Odreman, video producers); Jorge Drexler featuring C. Tangana – "Tocarte" (Joana Colomar, video director; Zissou, video producer); Guitarricadelafuente – "A Carta Cabal" (Pau Carrete, video director; Vivir Rodando, video producer); Rosalía – "Hentai" (Mitch Ryan, video director; Harrison Corwin and Patrick Donovan, video producers); Sin Bandera – "Nadie" (Hernán Corera and Juan Piczman, video directors; Sonti Charnas, Luca Macome, Balisario Saravia and Juan Saravia, video producers)	
2023	"Estás Buenísimo"	Nathy Peluso	Félix Bollaín and Rogelio González, video directors; María Rubio, video producer	Kayode – "Podcast/Pedra Memória" (Gabriel Avelar and Beto Galloni, video directors; Hugo Castelo Branco, Bruna Fernandes, André Cozman Ganut, Kozmos, Paladino, Regis Ramos and Yalla Rec, video producers); Luthuly featuring Nave – "Fixação" (Pedro Fiorillo and Jesus Mendes, video directors; Alcino Algarrao, Alcino Araujo, Ricardo Estevam, Paulo Miguez and Pamela Taby, video producers); Sen Senra – "No Quiero Ser un Cantante" (Torso, video director; Cap Dept, video producer); Wos – "DESCARTABLE" (Tomas Curland and Rafael Nir, video directors; Mariano Jaureguiberry, Abril Neistadt, Rafael Nir and Diego Ríos, video producers)	
2024	"313"	Residente, Sílvia Pérez Cruz and Penélope Cruz	Residente, video director; Carolina Wolf, video producer	Marc Anthony – "Ale Ale" (Carlos Pérez, video director; Joanna Egozcue, video producer); Bad Bunny – "Baticano" (Stillz, video director); C. Tangana – "Oliveira dos cen anos" (C. Tangana, video director); Leonel García – "Sálvanos" (Nuno Gomes, video director and video producer); Mau y Ricky – "Glock" (Daniel Duran, video director; Alegna Espinoza & Maricel Zambrano, video producers)	
2025	"#Tetas"	Ca7riel & Paco Amoroso	Ferrán Echegaray & Martin Piroyansky, video directors; Armando Bo, Chino Fernández & Francisco Wechsler, video producers	Bad Bunny – "El Clúb" (Matias Vasquez, video director; Noah Assad, Sigfredo Bellaflores, Juan Vasquez & Esteban Zuluaga, video producers); BK' – "Diamantes, Lágrimas e Rostos Para Esquecer (Dlre)" (Felipe Vellas, video director; Renata Dumont, video producer); Vera GRV – "Cura Pa Mi Alma" (Willy Rodriguez, video director; Ana Del Aguila González, Grayskull, Vera GRV, Enrique Martínez Hernández & Willy Rodríguez, video producers); Guitarricadelafuente – "Full Time Papi" (Albert Moya, video director; Philipp Ramhofer, video producer)	

^{^[I]} Each year is linked to the article about the Latin Grammy Awards held that year.

== Multiple wins and nominations ==
=== Most Wins ===
7 wins

- Residente (4 as member of Calle 13)

4 Wins

- Calle 13

3 Wins

- Juanes

=== Most Nominations ===
13 Nominations (6 as member of Calle 13)

- Residente

7 Nominations

- Calle 13

5 Nominations

- Juanes

4 Nominations

- Shakira

3 Nominations

- Marc Anthony
- Rosalia

2 Nominations

- Alejandro Sanz
- C. Tangana
- Julieta Venegas
- Ricky Martin
- Bad Bunny
- Guitarricadelafuente

== See also ==
- Grammy Award for Best Music Video
- Lo Nuestro Award for Video of the Year
- Los Premios MTV Latinoamérica for Video of the Year
