= Agustín Alberdi =

- Origin: patagonia

Agustín Alberdi is a Latin Grammy Award-winner music video director. And 3 gold Lions at same time at Cannes . Alberdi is director and partner of the production company Landia, which ranked at number 10 in the Cannes Lions International Advertising Festival in 2009. Landia presented short-films to advertise Coca-Cola and Stella Artois. For Stella Artois, Alberdi directed the TV commercials "Train", "eelevetor" and 3 shorts films "Smooth Originals", and 2 tv shows on London about recyclage and "Island" for Diesel.

Alberdi received a nomination for a Gardel Award in 2003 for his work directing "Dónde Vas" ("Where Are You Going?") by singer Dante Spinetta. The following year Alberdi was awarded the Gardel for Best Music Video for "Irresponsables" ("Irresponsible") by Argentinean band Babasónicos. In 2008, Alberdi directed "Odio por Amor", the fourth single of La Vida... Es Un Ratico by Juanes.

Alberti directed the music video "Pijamas" for Babasónicos, for which they received a Latin Grammy Award nomination for Best Short Form Music Video. Alberdi, along directed "Microdancing" for Babasónicos.

Alberdi was awarded the Latin Grammy for Best Short Form Music Video for "Bien o Mal" performed by Mexican singer-songwriter Julieta Venegas, a video that "takes femininity to a strange place" according to Venegas. Alberdi also directed "Despedida" for Venegas, with locations on Tandil, Argentina, and Isidro Fabela, Mexico. Alberdi said about the video that it has "multiple meanings, so that each viewer can watch it and attach to it his or her personal feelings." Alberdi is married to Silvana Grosso and father of twins.
