= Luis Miguel Leal =

- Occupation: Music video director
- Website: Comet Content

Luis Miguel Leal is a Venezuelan Latin Grammy Award-winner music video director.

Leal is part of Salto Ángel Media, along César Rodríguez and Jorge Barboza. Leal was awarded the Latin Grammy for Best Short Form Music Video at the 8th Latin Grammy Awards for directing "Ven a Mi Casa Esta Navidad" by Venezuelan band Voz Veis. The video was created during a very problematic time for the members of the production company, according to producer Jorge Barboza. In a creative meeting "we thought it was nicer to show what Christmas is: try to take out the child we all have inside. Each image and frame in the video stands for moments that marked our christmases," Barboza stated. In a following meeting they decide that the video should be animated, launching a casting for cartoonists. The coloring was led by Tamara Hadeed. The video was eventually given a 3D treatment, including animations of the band members of which only the faces were taken and integrated into existing images. Leal is brother of a member of Voz Veis and was involved in all the music videos created for the band.

Leal directed "Corazón Sin Cara" for Puerto-Rican singer Prince Royce. Music producer Sergio George contacted Salto Ángel Media to produce and direct a second version for the video, which was simpler than the work the production company usually does. The Venezuelan model Albany Blanco was hired to star in the video. "Corazón Sin Cara" earned the "Favorite Video Award" at the Premios Juventud in 2011. The song also ended the year as the best-performing Latin single in the United States according to Billboard magazine. Elvis Crespo recorded "Quítame la Camisa" with the band Montecarlo in 2012. The music video for the song was directed by Leal.

He has lately worked into fictional films with his opera prima "The Case Against Mr. Sheppard", in 2018 where he joined back with producer and writer Jorge Barboza to create a 12-minute thriller that was shown in Film Festivals around the world.
