= Donde los ponys pastan =

Donde los Ponys Pastan

EP by Porter
- Released: November 11, 2004
- Genre: Indie rock; alternative rock
- Length: 27:55
- Label: 3er Piso
- Producer: Alex Pérez; Porter

Porter chronology
Donde los Ponys Pastan (2004)	Atemahawke (2007)

Alternate cover
- Cover of 2007 Re-release

Donde los Ponys Pastan (Where Ponies Graze) is the debut EP of the Mexican indie band Porter. Their first single, "Espiral", received extensive airplay on Mexican radio stations and on Mexican music television.

The album was re-released in late 2007 with a bonus live version of "Espiral" as track 8.

== Track listing ==
All tracks are written by Porter

No.	Title	Length
1.	"Espiral"	5:22
2.	"Girl"	3:57
3.	"Interlude complicado" (Instrumental)	2:35
4.	"No te encuentro"	4:55
5.	"Daphne"	4:01
6.	"Bipolar"	4:46
7.	"Interlude dos viene" (Instrumental)	2:19

2007 re-release and iTunes bonus track
No.	Title	Length
8.	"Espiral" (Live; recorded in Zapopan, Mexico, 8/10/05)	5:41

== Personnel ==
Porter

- Juan Son – vocals
- Fernando de la Huerta – guitar
- Victor Valverde – guitar, piano
- Diego Rangel – bass, synthesizer, programmer
- Juan Pablo "Chata" Vázquez – drums

Additional

- Alex Pérez – producer
- Golpe Avisa – design, logo
