= Atemahawke =

Studio album by Porter
- Released: May 15, 2007
- Genres: Experimental rock; indie rock; alternative rock; dream pop
- Length: 47:27
- Label: 3er Piso
- Producers: Odín Parada; Alex Pérez

Porter chronology
Donde Los Ponys Pastan (2004)	Atemahawke (2007)	Moctezuma (2015)

Singles from Atemahawke
- 1. "Host of a Ghost" Released: November 5, 2008

Professional ratings
Review scores
Source	Rating
AllMusic	3.5/5 stars

Atemahawke is the debut album of Mexican surrealist rock band Porter, released on May 15, 2007. To date, the only single released is "Host of a Ghost". The name consists of an English phonetic translation of Nahuatl for Guadalajara, Ātemaxac [aːteˈmaʃak]. Each of the album's songs have a back story which are printed in the album, giving further explanation to the lyrics. The album was later named the 3rd best of the decade by Latin music website Club Fonograma. This is the band's last release with vocalist Juan Son.

Following the album's release, Porter performed at Al Borde's Rock N' Bliss in Hollywood, California on October 12, 2007, the band's first performance outside of Mexico. The band would later perform at the 2008 Coachella Festival with Natalia Lafourcade performing "Host of a Ghost" on stage with the band. Shortly after the performance at Coachella, Porter became inactive and broke up before reforming in 2013 with vocalist David Velasco.

== Track listing ==
No.	Title	Length
1.	"El túnel"	1:37
2.	"Este cosmos"	3:15
3.	"Vaquero galáctico"	3:51
4.	"Host of a Ghost"	4:20
5.	"Hansel & Gretel's Bollywood Story"	5:01
6.	"Bailando con mi virginidad"	4:42
7.	"Al fin me darás un reno"	4:24
8.	"Estocolmo"	3:09
9.	"Cuervos"	5:09
10.	"Ana Paula (Viaje al 113)"	2:34
11.	"Xoloitzcuintle chicloso" (Contains an untitled hidden track starting 7:55)	9:24

== Personnel ==
Porter

- Juan Son – vocals
- Victor "Villor" Valverde – guitar, piano
- Fernando "Fehr" de la Huerta – guitar
- Diego "Bacter" Rangel – bass, synthesizer, programming
- Juan Pablo "Chata" Vázque – drums

Additional

- Odín Parada – producer, bajo sexto, bateria, keyboards
- Alex Pérez – producer, bajo sexto, bateria, keyboards, programming
- Ron Boustead – mastering
- Jesus Cabrera – violin, viola
