= Bien o Mal =

Single by Julieta Venegas

from the album Otra Cosa
- Language: Spanish
- Released: January 18, 2010
- Recorded: Julieta Venegas' House (Mexico City, Mexico), Mondomix (Buenos Aires, Argentina)
- Length: 2:59
- Label: Sony International
- Songwriters: Julieta Venegas, Alejandro Sergi
- Producers: Julieta Venegas, Cachorro López

Julieta Venegas singles chronology
"Bajo Otra Luz" (2009)	"Bien o Mal" (2010)	"Despedida" (2010)

Music video
- "Bien o Mal" on YouTube

"Bien o Mal" (English: "Right or Wrong") is a song by Mexican singer-songwriter Julieta Venegas. It was released as first single from her studio album, Otra Cosa. The launch of this song was made January 18, 2010. The Argentine singer-songwriter Alejandro Sergi apart from being a collaborator in writing this song appears on backing vocals. "Bien o Mal" entered the top ten of Mexico and is popular in Latin America, Spain and entered on the US Latin Pop Airplay, Hot Latin Tracks and Tropical Songs. The music video was recorded in December 2009 in Argentina and on November 11, 2010, won the Latin Grammy Award for Best Short Form Music Video.

== Song information ==
The song written by Julieta Venegas with the collaboration of Argentine singer Alejandro Sergi vocalist from Miranda!, the single was released on digital download on January 10, 2010, quickly hit the top of the Mexican and Latin American radio. The song is about the fear people have as they start a relationship.

== Promotion ==
One week after leaving the album on sale in iTunes (U.S.) it was released as a single song of the week as a free gift to iTunes subscribers. The album continued to grow in sales by reaching more people in the U.S.

== Music video ==
The clip was shot on the outskirts of Buenos Aires during the month of December 2009 and was directed by Agustín Alberdi. "The songs I was working largely in absolute seclusion, and now we are only replacing what you have to play well, and leaving what works, so it's going to be a CD with a lot of homework," she said.

The video begins with Venegas sitting on a simple throne. She wields a sword and many women are gathered around her. The scene changes and the women feast on an abundance of flowers. Then the video cuts to the scene of an ill-groomed man dancing strangely. Throughout the rest of the video, the women are seen secreting butterflies as flatulence. In the last portion of the video, a clip of one of Venegas' broadcasts from Facebook of her singing and dancing to the song is interposed.

The video is a parody of the view that the ones who "wield the sword" and "bring home the bacon" (men) dictate what is considered lady like. In this parodied world, Venegas wields the sword, therefore dictating what is lady like. The women eat as they please, regardless of how they look while doing so. Furthermore, these women also excrete flatulence as they please, but this flatulence is considered lady like because they secrete beautiful butterflies. Venegas created the video as a counterpoint to society's many double standards and rules of etiquette that women are expected to follow (i.e. the view that flatulence is not lady like).

== Track listing ==
- Digital download

No.	Title	Writer(s)	Length
1.	"Bien o Mal"	Julieta Venegas, Alejandro Sergi	2:57

== Charts ==
Chart performance for "Bien o Mal"
Chart (2010)	Peak position
Mexico (Billboard Mexican Airplay)	12
Mexico (Billboard Espanol Airplay)	9
Mexico (Monitor Latino)	4
Spain (PROMUSICAE)	45
US Hot Latin Songs (Billboard)	21
US Latin Pop Airplay (Billboard)	8
US Tropical Songs (Billboard)	40

== Awards ==
Latin Grammy

Year	Title	Result
2010
2010	Best Form Music Video	Won

== Remixes ==
- Mexican Institute of Sound Remix (iTunes "Otra Cosa" [Deluxe Version] bonus track)— 3:12
