= Jason Archer and Paul Beck =

American music video directors

Jason Archer and Paul Beck are a team of American music video directors, and animators. They specialize in the animation rotoscoping technique which have been used on their work for the films Waking Life and A Scanner Darkly. Archer and Beck also directed music videos for several performers including David Byrne, Juanes and Molotov. The duo won a Latin Grammy Award for Best Short Form Music Video at the Latin Grammy Awards of 2003 for "Frijolero".

== Career ==
Archer and Beck directed an animated music video for "The Great Intoxication" by singer-songwriter David Byrne in 2002. In the same year they presented a piece of art for the opening of the Science 102 in South River City, Austin, Texas, including "State of the Union", a parody of George W. Bush's state of the union address. The duo also submitted the video "Homeland Hoedown" to the British band Radiohead, which they included as the episode four of their website www.radioheadtv.com and later on the DVD The Most Gigantic Lying Mouth of All Time. Archer and Beck directed the music video for "La Paga" by Colombian singer-songwriter Juanes.

Archer and Beck were awarded the Best Short Form Music Video at the Latin Grammy Awards of 2003 for the music video "Frijolero" by Mexican band Molotov; the video also received the Video of the Year award at the MTV Video Music Awards Latinoamérica 2003. The second video directed for Molotov, "Hit Me", was also nominated for a Latin Grammy Award. "Frijolero" and "Hit Me" ranked at number two on the list for Top 10 Film/Video Notables of 2003 by Rachel Koper of The Austin Chronicle.

In 2005, Archer and Beck worked in the independent film A Scanner Darkly, based on the novel by Philip K. Dick published in 1977. The film was the first adult-oriented animated film since 1981's Heavy Metal, with different themes such as government surveillance, corporate malfeasance, and paranoia. "We were contacted by Tommy [Pallota] because we had worked as animators on Waking Life and done some music video work [that he had liked]. I think one of the primary concerns was the budget." said Archer. Archer and Beck hired 25 animators to finish in four months the 92 minutes of animation included in the film. They were commissioned to make a short film for Al Gore's presentation at the Tribeca Film Festival in 2007.

Archer and Beck used a combination of live action and the rotoscope animation on the documentary The Eyes of Me, that chronicles the lives of four blind teenagers attending the Texas School for the Blind and Visually Impaired. They received an Emmy Award nomination for Outstanding Graphic Design & Art Direction.
