= Jorge Rodríguez (director) =

Jorge "Fish" Rodríguez
- Occupation: Music video director

Jorge "Fish" Rodríguez is a Latin Grammy Award-winner music video director. Rodríguez was awarded the Best Short Form Music Video at the Latin Grammy Awards of 2006 for "Atrévete-te-te", co-directed by Gabriel Coss and performed by Calle 13. Rodríguez challenged the types of images seen in mainstream hip-hop videos with "Atrévete-te-te", with René Pérez (Residente), the band's lead singer, not wearing massive gold chains or drinking bottles of champagne, and questioning the current lifestyle of Puerto Ricans who try to emulate the American lifestyle.

Rodríguez relied on tutorials to learn film techniques, and studied sculpture and specialized in image and design. Rodríguez became involved in film after a trip to Argentina, while drinking at a bar discussing politics and Latin American history with locals. Through that conversation he became aware of South America’s "Dirty War" during which thousands of students, intellectuals, and professionals were targeted by the Argentine government, and became interested in creating a documentary about the Plaza de Mayo massacre. Rodríguez also has credits for his work in the art direction department of the films The Losers, in 2010, and Fast Five and The Rum Diary in 2011; and the TV Series Off the Map and Eastbound & Down.

In 2010, a documentary co-directed by Richard Santiago and Rodríguez about Puerto Rico boxers was shown at the Institute for Puerto Rican Arts and Culture, "these boxers are like Tibetan monks... no drinking, no sex, etc. to prepare for fighting." said Santiago about the documentary. Rodríguez also directed the music video for "Pasarela" by Puerto Rican rapper Dalmata.

Rodríguez chronicled in 2011 a trip to Bhutan, one of the most inaccessible countries of the world, for the magazine El Punto Es. Rodríguez did the art direction for the short film La Vida Sexual de los Camarones (The Sexual Life of Shrimp).
