= Alejandro Santiago Ciena =

Music video director (1977/1978 – 2022)

- Born: 1977 or 1978
- Died: October 10, 2022 (aged 44) San Juan, Puerto Rico
- Occupation: Music video director
- Website: Crema Batida Cinema on Vimeo

Alejandro Santiago Ciena (1977/1978 – October 10, 2022) was a Latin Grammy Award-winner music video director. He was the director of the production company Crema Batida Films, and also has credits as a second unit director for the Puerto-Rican film Manuela y Manuel (2007). Santiago Ciena was best known for his work directing music videos for the Puerto-Rican band Calle 13; Santiago Ciena was the cousin of René Pérez (Residente), the band's lead singer. The first video he directed for the band was "Calma Pueblo", the lead single of Entren Los Que Quieran in 2010. The video presented Calle 13 as terrorists dressed as nuns and was deemed as "violent" by Judy Cantor-Navas of Billboard magazine. Santiago Ciena, commented about the concept of the video, which uses nudity as a representation of freedom: "We wanted the lyrics and the visuals to be strong... we wanted it to be real, but still have a positive message to the show the union of people who fight to produce art." The video was recorded in Milla de Oro, San Juan, Puerto Rico, and was intended as a tribute to the work of American photographer Spencer Tunick. Calle 13 and Santiago received the Latin Grammy Award for Best Short Form Music Video for "Calma Pueblo".

Santiago also directed "Muerte en Hawaii" for Calle 13. In the music video, Residente is joined by model Jimar Freshold, as they run for their lives on a beach with a "shocking ending". Crema Batida Films also were responsible for the production and direction for "Como Curar" by Zion & Lennox, a music video about a virus that infects women; the budget for the video was estimated at US$100,000. Santiago directed "Huérfano de Amor" for Don Omar featuring Syko, the second single of Don Omar Presents: Meet the Orphans in 2011.

He died on October 10, 2022, at the age of 44 in San Juan, Puerto Rico.
