= La Historia Sin Fin =

Studio album by Porter
- Released: 25 February 2022
- Genre: Dream pop; synth-pop
- Length: 36:27
- Label: Universal Music México
- Producer: Porter; Alejandro Perez Sandoval

Porter chronology
Las Batallas (2019)	La Historia Sin Fin (2022)

Singles from La Historia Sin Fin
- 1. "Sonámbulo" Released: 5 May 2021; 2. "Sol@" Released: 13 August 2021; 3. "Ranchito" Released: 5 November 2021; 4. "Mamito Santa" Released: 10 December 2021

Professional ratings
Review scores
Source	Rating
Dark Impala	8.8/10

La Historia Sin Fin (English: "The Endless Story") is the fourth studio album by Mexican indie rock band Porter. Self-produced by the band and Alejandro Perez Sandoval, the album was released on 25 February 2022 through Universal Music México.

== Background and release ==
Porter released its third studio album, Las Batallas (Eng: "The Battles"), on 24 May 2019. Less than a year into the album's promotional tour the band had to cease touring due to the COVID-19 pandemic. Porter would use the time off from touring to begin work on its fourth album.

Porter released the single "Sonámbulo" on 5 May 2021, stating that it would be appearing on the band's next album. The album's second single, "Sol@", was released on 13 August. The single "Ranchito" would be released on 5 November. The album's fourth and final single, "Mamita Santa", would be released a month later on 10 December.

== Track listing ==
All tracks are written by David Velasco, Fernando de la Huerta, Víctor Valverde, Diego Rangel, and Jesus Pérez.

No.	Title	Length
1.	"Cachito de Galaxia" (feat. Ana Torroja)	4:57
2.	"Guirnalda"	3:49
3.	"Ranchito"	3:16
4.	"Roma"	4:03
5.	"Sonámbulo"	4:24
6.	"La Sombra del Amor"	4:22
7.	"Sol@"	3:01
8.	"Mamita Santa"	3:13
9.	"Sayonara"	2:56
10.	"TX8"	2:26

== Personnel ==
Adapted from AllMusic:

Porter

- David Velasco – vocals
- Fernando de la Huerte – guitar
- Víctor Valverde – guitar, piano, keyboards
- Diego Rangel – bass, programming

Additional musicians

- Sergio Mendez – drums
- Ana Torroja – additional vocals on track 1
- Alejandro Perez Sandoval – synthesizer
- Alex Pérez – synthesizer
- Chai Flores – clarinet
- Isaias Jáuregui – trumpet
- Joaquin Trejo Gomez – cornet, French horn
- Jose Luis Lopez Barboza – tuba
- Samuel Flores Jauregui – trombone
- Victor Rubio Hernandez – trumpet

Production

- Porter – producer
- Alejandro Perez Sandoval – producer
- Eduardo de la Paz – mastering
- Felix Davis – mastering
- Metropolis – mastering
