= Porter (band) =

Mexican indie rock band

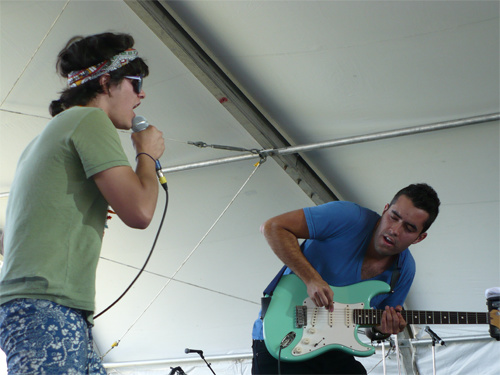
- Former vocalist Juan Son (left) and Víctor "Villor" Valverde (right) performing live

Background information
- Origin: Guadalajara, Jalisco, Mexico
- Genres: Experimental rock; alternative rock; indie rock; dream pop
- Years active: 2004–2008; 2013–present
- Labels: 3er Piso Records; Industrias WIO; Universal Music
- Members: David Velasco; Fernando de la Huerta; Víctor Valverde; Diego Rangel
- Past members: Juan Son; Juan Pablo Vázquez
- Website: http://porteroficial.com/

Porter is a Mexican indie rock band based in Guadalajara, Mexico.

Despite their uncommon sound the band got decent radio airplay on important broadcasting stations, their videos: "Espiral", "Daphne" and "Host of a Ghost" had a good reception in music video channels. "Daphne" was placed in the Telehit's Top Ten videos and, more recently, "Host of a Ghost". (October 2007). The band has overall acceptance among critics & the audience, which often labels their sound as weird, interesting and vanguardish.

== History ==
=== Formation, Donde los ponys pastan, and Atemahawke ===
Porter was formed in May 2004. At the beginning they were an instrumental band, until Juan Son joined the band that same year. They then recorded the EP Donde los ponys pastan, with 3er piso records, a Mexican indie record label. This EP was produced by Alejandro Pérez Orco (member of Azul Violeta) and includes seven songs, among which are: "No te encuentro" ("I can't find you"), "Girl", "Daphne", "Bipolar" and their most popular song "Espiral". There are also two instrumental songs in this EP called "Interlude" and "Interlude Complicado". Later that year, Porter made it to the semi-finals of an indie rock band contest called 0-music, with the song "I can't find you".

On September 3, 2006, they served as the opening act for The Strokes at the Arena VFG in Guadalajara.

Porter performed on the 2007 Vive Latino festival, where the first copies of their debut album, Atemahawke were available. The album went on sale on May 15, 2007.

Porter also performed for the first time outside of Mexico in Hollywood, California at Al Borde's Rock N' Bliss concert on October 12, 2007, and, in 2008, at the Coachella Festival where Natalia Lafourcade joined them on stage during the performance of "Host of a Ghost".

Their music has been classified as alternative, indie, and experimental. However, lyrics often explore surrealist and space rock themes combining English and Spanish languages. As an example, the 2007 track "Xoloitzcuintle Chicloso" contains Spanish words from Nahuatl (the title comes from xoloitzcuintli, a kind of dog, and tzictli, gum, gummy dog); the whole story relies on a cat-alike dressed kid (Vega) and a talking dog (Chicloso). On the other hand, "Host of a Ghost" and "Girl" were written completely in English.

=== Break-up ===
After a hiatus and various rumors of disbanding, they dissolved after playing the Coachella Valley Music and Arts Festival in Indio, California in 2008.

Juan Son, former vocalist for Porter went on to focus on a solo project, releasing the critically praised Mermaid Sashimi in February 2009. Victor "Villor" Valverde (former Porter member) joined Juan Son's band for a time before working on his architecture career. The first new single from Mermaid Sashimi is titled "Nada". A music video was recorded for the song. Juan Son and his newly formed band recently opened for Sigur Rós in Mexico City and took part in the Rock N' Exa concert in 2009. The song "Goldfish" was released as the second single from Mermaid Sashimi, as with some of Porter's previous music it is entirely in English.

Juan Son has mentioned in interviews that the last few months as a member of Porter were no longer inspiring to him. He admitted to being very lazy and playing with little or no enthusiasm. He said he got along great with the guys and still does to this day but he saw himself doing something else. His solo album has less guitars and live drums and more samples and a mixture of different genres.

The other members of the band focused on finishing their education and their own solo project, most notably, Fernando de la Huerta in the band Vansen Tiger and Diego Bacter with his group Holger and solo work.

=== Reunion and Moctezuma ===
On December 4, 2012, during the announcement of the Vive Latino 2013 music festival lineup, it was confirmed that Porter would meet to perform at the festival. In 2013, several days before their performance, they released their first new single since getting back together, "Kiosco". A few months later on June 8, Porter performed again at the first annual Loudblue festival presented by Ballantine's. Two days prior, the band announced on their Facebook page that Juan Son would not be joining them on stage, instead the musician David Velasco would be filling in. There were no specific reasons cited for Juan Son's absence.

July 17, the band announced: "We would like to inform you all that Juan Carlos [Juan Son] will not be participating with Porter for an indefinite period of time. We spent 5 years hoping to meet again, but now we are only four on the journey. We are writing new music which in September we will share. Soon we will announce new dates. We appreciate the unconditional support. Porter forever."

In 2015 they released a new album, Moctezuma, and toured to promote it during 2015 and 2016. Rolling Stone considered this one of the top ten latin albums of 2015.

=== Las Batallas ===
On November 28, 2018, the band released the EP Las Batallas del Tiempo, a teaser for the band's then upcoming third studio album. Las Batallas, the band's third album, was released on May 24, 2019. The album's promotional tour would be cut short due to the onset of the COVID-19 pandemic.

=== La Historia Sin Fin ===
With the promotional tour for Las Batallas being cut short, Porter announced that it would begin work on a new album. On May 5, 2021, the band released a new song and music video, "Sonámbulo". The song is set to appear on the band's fourth studio album. The album's second single, "Sol@", was released on August 13. The band's fourth album, La Historia Sin Fin (The Endless Story) was released on February 25, 2022.

== Musical style ==
Their sound consists of a mixture of electronic and acoustic beats, rock guitars, sound loops and (before Juan Son left the band) the singer's distinctive tenor voice and high pitch vocals. The band had cited artists such Air, Sigur Rós, Caifanes, Zurdok, Röyksopp, Café Tacvba, The Cure and Mecano as influences. In fact, portions of songs from several of these influences and others have been included in live performances of their songs.

== Band members ==
Current

- Fernando de la Huerta – guitar, synthesizer, programming (2004–2008; 2013–present)
- Víctor Valverde – guitar, piano, keyboards (2004–2008; 2013–present)
- Diego Rangel – bass, synthesizer, programming (2004–2008; 2013–present)
- David Velasco – lead vocals (2013–present)

Former

- Juan Son – lead vocals (2004–2008)
- Juan Pablo Vázquez – drums (2004–2008; 2013–2019)

Touring/session musicians

- José Luis Mejía – drums (2019)
- Aarón Steele – drums (2019)
- Gunnar Olsen – drums (2019)
- Sergio Mendez – drums (2021–present)

Timeline

== Discography ==
=== Albums ===
- Atemahawke (2007)
- Moctezuma (2015)
- Las Batallas (2019)
- La Historia Sin Fin (2022)

=== EPs ===
- Donde los ponys pastan (2004)
- Las Batallas del Tiempo (2018)

=== Music videos ===
Year	Song	Album
2005	"Espiral"	Donde los Ponys Pastan
2005	"Daphne"	Donde los Ponys Pastan
2008	"Host of a Ghost"	Atemahawke
2014	"Palapa"	Moctezuma
2015	"Huitzil"	Moctezuma
2015	"Rincón Yucateco"	Moctezuma
2016	"La China"	Moctezuma
2018	"¿Qué Es El Amor?"	Las Batallas
2018	"Pajáros"	Las Batallas
2018	"Himno Eterno"	Las Batallas
2019	"Chesko"	Las Batallas
2019	"Cuando Lloro"	Las Batallas
2019	"Para Ya"	Las Batallas
2021	"Sonámbulo"	La Historia Sin Fin
2021	"Ranchito"	La Historia Sin Fin
2021	"Mamita Santa"	La Historia Sin Fin
