= Juan Son =

Mexican singer (born 1984

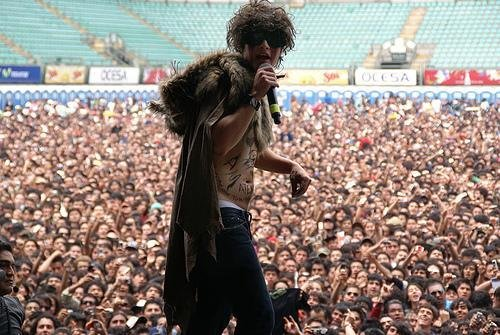
- Juan Son from backstage

Background information
- Born: 24 January 1984 (age 42); Guadalajara, Mexico
- Origin: Guadalajara, Mexico
- Genres: Alternative rock, indie rock, noise pop
- Years active: 2001–present
- Label: Universal Music Group
- Website: juan-son.com

Juan Carlos Pereda (born January 24, 1984, in Guadalajara, Mexico) is a Mexican singer and composer of experimental music. He was the vocalist of the alternative rock band Porter and collaborated with Simone Pace (Blonde Redhead) as the drummer for AEIOU. He also performs solo under the pseudonym Juan Son.

His musical style is described as "a beautiful concoction of confident lyricism, squeezebox rock, Mexican folk, electronic tinkering, and theatrical dance music."

== Biography ==
Juan Son, born Juan Carlos Pereda in 1984, started his artistic career in 2001 with Nouveau, a Guadalajara rock band. In 2003, at 19, he sailed off to study at the London Center of Contemporary Music, to return one year later and become part of Porter. The addition of the singer-songwriter from Guadalajara, México, helped them become one of the most popular groups of the indie rock movement in Mexico. Their EP Donde los ponys pastan, and their first album Atemahawke(2007) got to 4th place in the top 100 and stayed in the charts for 30 weeks. After a short successful run, he left the band due to creative differences, and Juan Son became a solo act. He has stated in interviews that being in Porter had become less inspiring to him and he felt restricted as far as the kind of music he was expected to create.

His first album, Mermaid Sashimi (2009), won him a Latin Grammy nomination. On Mermaid Sashimi, he uses techniques such as sound sampling, voice effects, wordless chanting, and writing in three different languages. The vocal effects recreate the imagined sounds of mermaids throughout his recording. According to him, the nature of the English language gives a sense of coldness and practicality, while the Spanish verses add warmth and romance.

In 2010, he moved to New York, where he made the acquaintance of many leading figures in music, such as Bjork and Blonde Redhead. After meeting Simone Pace, the drummer for Blonde Redhead, he requested his help on his next album. The result was Space Hymns, a collaboration between the two under the name AEIOU. They went on to perform at the Sonar Festival in Barcelona, Spain in 2011 and the Bicycle Film Festival in Mexico City in 2012.

== Awards and nominations ==
- 2009: Latin Grammy nomination: Best Alternative Song for "Nada"
- 2009: Rock En Exa
- 2009: Myspace Award Mexico (Internet most voted)
- 2007: Pantalla de Cristal

== Featuring festivals and selected appearances ==
- 2013: Vive Latino 2013 (as Porter)
- 2012 Bicycle Film Festival Mexico City. (as AEIOU)
- 2011: Sonar Barcelona (as AEIOU)
- 2010: Amanda Palmer's Late Night Cabaret, New York City
- 2009: All Tomorrow's Parties (music festival) curated by The Breeders, Minehead, England
- 2009: Sxsw, Austin, Texas
- 2009: Mission Creek Music and Arts Festival, San Francisco, California
- 2009: Latin Grammy Awards Las Vegas, Nevada
- 2009: Fontanas (with John Cameron Mitchell), New York City
- 2008: Coachella Valley Music and Arts Festival, Indio, California (as Porter)
- 2007: Los Premios MTV Latinoamérica 2007, Playa del Carmen, Mexico (as Porter)
- 2007: Vive Latino 2007 (as Porter)
- 2006: Vive Latino 2006 (as Porter)
- 2005: Vive Latino 2005 (as Porter)

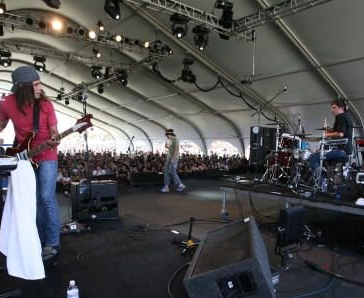
Juan Son in the midground at Coachella 2008.

== Music videos ==
- 2009: Mermaid Sashimi: Wrote
- 2009: Nada
- 2008: Daphne, as Porter, Wrote
- 2008: Host of a Ghost, as Porter, Wrote, Directed
- 2007: Espiral, as Porter

== Discography ==
=== Juan Son ===
- "Libertades" collaboration with Simon Pace – Single(2019)
- "Abandonado" collaboration with Transgresorcorruptor – Single(2019).
- " 11:59 P.M." collaboration with Transgresorcorruptor – Single(2019).
- Montaña (single, 2019)

=== Juan Son ===
- Siento (single, 2018)
- Where are the lyrics (single, 2018)
- Oceania (single, 2018)
- Liberte (single, 2018)
- Flying over the wall (single, 2018)
- Benvenuti (single, 2018)

=== As 7 ===
- 7 (2016)

=== With AEIOU ===
- Space Hymns (2011), (Mexico Only) International release not yet scheduled

=== As Juan Son ===
- Nos vamos juntos - Un tributo a las canciones de Caifanes y Jaguares (2010) – " Ayer me dijo un ave" – single.

=== As Juan Son ===
- Mermaid Sashimi (2009)

=== With Porter ===
- Donde los ponys pastan (EP, 2007)
- Atemahawke (2007)

=== Duets ===
- Julieta Venegas – "De Mis Pasos" (2008) Unplugged
- Los Odio! – "I Want You To Want Me" (2008) Soundtrack to Rudo y Cursi (Disco Rudo)
- Natalia Lafourcade – "Look Outside" (2009) Hu Hu Hu
