= Despedida (Julieta Venegas song) =

Single by Julieta Venegas

from the album Otra Cosa
- Language: Spanish
- Released: 11 May 2010
- Recorded: Julieta Venegas' House (Mexico City, Mexico), Mondomix (Buenos Aires, Argentina)
- Length: 2:59
- Label: Sony International
- Songwriter: Julieta Venegas
- Producers: Julieta Venegas; Cachorro López

Julieta Venegas singles chronology
"Bien o mal" (2010)	"Despedida" (2010)	"Abel" (2010)

Music video
- "Despedida" on YouTube

Music video
- "Despedida (2 °Corte)" on YouTube

"Despedida" (English:"Farewell") is a song by Mexican singer-songwriter Julieta Venegas. It is released as the second single on 11 May 2010 from the album "Otra Cosa". This song was inspired by the Mexican singer-songwriter José Alfredo Jiménez. "Despedida" entered the Latin Pop Airplay and received positive reviews considered the best song from her album. The song has 2 different versions of the music video, one for Europe and the other to the Americas.

== Song information ==
The song was written by Julieta Venegas and musically is a mixture of Ranchera and Latin pop.

It was released on iTunes in digital download on May 11, 2010. Days later, the singer announced her retirement from the stage to focus on motherhood. Julieta Venegas was inspired to create this song in the Mexican composer José Alfredo Jiménez told herself. The song is saying goodbye to someone in good shape, without rancor or hatred, if it did not work better to say goodbye. Several newspapers and music magazines as Rolling Stone Mexico cataloged "Despedida" as the best song of "Otra Cosa".

As part of promoting the song, this summer launched a call Julieta called "Haz Otra Cosa Este Vernano", one divided into three categories: Remix and video that were to develop a remix and a clip of the single and Campaign which was rated the best idea to publicize the song. The winning video was uploaded on the official site on YouTube.

The song entered the Latin Pop Airplay in the position #35. The song has no promotion, just appearing one week in the Mexican radio.

== Music video ==
Officially launched on August 18, 2010, but the day before was already available on some Internet sites. The clip follows the line of the single predecessor "Bien o mal," offers a full range of meanings for each viewer to design and give you a personal sense.

Basically it is a fun comedy show on the screen and start the sentence "This track should be heard loud" and then a man with old clothes, his face covered with flowers in her socks, which falls over and rolls down a hill. Then there is a pregnant Julieta wearing a black one piece dress and a purple hat while alternating images of the man, rolling downhill, and pairs of animals such as zebras, lions, ostriches, gorillas, giraffes, moose and turtles in mating season. Then the man, much bigger than Julieta, falls close as she placed a vinyl record which finishes playing the song. The video ends showing Julieta sitting on a golden chair singing a cappella (as completed the video for "Bien o mal.")

The video itself reflects that the relations have many times and the farewell is just one of them, the one before the next meeting.

It was recorded in two stages: the first was chosen the city of Tandil, Argentina. The second part was filmed in the town of Isidro Fabela in Mexico State.

On November 30, 2010, comes the second edition of the video, in the Second Court further noted Julieta Venegas singing while walking, a change from the first video does not appear the giants and mating animals displayed very little in boxes, the end of the video does not appear as singing a cappella in the first edition.

Not been as widespread as the first but it appears on MTV UK, Spain, Denmark, Netherlands among other countries in Europe as in Latin America VH1.

== Track listing ==
- Digital download

No.	Title	Writer(s)	Length
1.	"Depedida"	Julieta Venegas	3:26

== Charts ==
Chart performance for "Despedida"
Chart (2010)	Peak position
US Latin Pop Airplay (Billboard)	35

== Remixes ==
- Despedida (Despike Masters Mix) (Official Remix)
