= Voz Veis =

Venezuelan musical group

- Origin: Maracaibo, Venezuela
- Genres: Pop
- Years active: 1997-2010
- Labels: Vene Music, Universal Music
- Members: Luis Enrique Leal; Luis Fernando "Luigi" Castillo; Carlos Eduardo Labrador; Roberto Ignacio Zambrano; Gustavo Alfredo González; Santiago Henry Castillo
- Website: http://www.vozveis.com

Voz Veis was a Venezuelan boy band that released their last studio album "Acústico... Una Noche Común y Sin Corriente" in 2010. They recorded 7 studio albums; the first, Lo Mejor Aún Está Por Venir in 1997. The group had 6 lead singers: Carlos Labrador, Luis Fernando "Luigi" Castillo, Roberto Zambrano, Gustavo González, Santiago Castillo, and Luis Enrique Leal.

After obtaining a contract in 2007 with local Venezuelan newspaper Diario La Verdad to distribute 10,000 copies (the minimum amount required by the Latin Grammy organization) of their album "¿Cómo Se Llega a Belén?", the group succeeded in competing in the 2008 Latin Grammy Awards and consequently won the Best Short Form Music Video for "Ven A Mi Casa Esta Navidad", produced by the Salto Angel Media company and Best Children's Album, becoming the first Venezuelans to earn awards in these categories.

== Discography ==
=== Studio albums ===
==== Lo Mejor Aún Está Por Venir (1997) ====
1. Razones
2. Buenas Nuevas
3. Ojalá
4. Voz Veis a Ilán [Potpurrí]
5. Sin Rencor
6. Yo Soy Aquel
7. Otra Cara Bonita
8. Canción
9. No Volverá
10. A Guaco [Potpurrí]

==== Virao (2003) ====
1. Virao
2. Pa' Que No Me Puedas Olvidar
3. Te Quiero de Colores
4. Tanto Swing
5. Para Volver a Comenzar
6. Y Cómo Haré
7. Aunque Sea Poco
8. Ya No Estas Aquí
9. Respiro
10. Yo Sin Ti No Valgo Nada
11. Aunque Sea Poco [Acústica]
12. Cosita Rica
13. Pa' Que No Me Puedas Olvidar [Acústica]
14. La Colmena de la Vida

==== Vas (2004) ====
1. Vas
2. Inexplicable
3. El Farolito
4. Devuélveme Mi Amor
5. Te Brindo
6. Cuento Que Te Amo
7. Pedacito de Tu Querer
8. Di Que Voy a Hacer Contigo
9. La Mesera
10. Niña Dura
11. Tibios Besos
12. Esos Ojos Que Me Miran

==== ¿Cómo Se Llega a Belén? (2006) ====
1. ¿Cómo Se Llega a Belén?
2. El Tamborilero
3. Gloria
4. Ven a Mi Casa Esta Navidad
5. Santa Claus Is Coming to Town
6. Oíd Un Son
7. El Burrito Sabanero
8. Noche de Bien
9. Esos Ojos Que Me Miran
10. Feliz Navidad
11. El Burrito Mix

==== ¿Qué Me Has Hecho Tú? (2007) ====
1. Segundo Plato
2. Marta
3. Al Otro Lado
4. ¿Qué Me Has Hecho Tú?
5. Quizás
6. Jamás Se Dice Adiós
7. Cosita Rica
8. Te Enseño a Aterrizar
9. Bailamos
10. Dame Un Día
11. Quiero Ir

==== Todos a Belén (2008) ====
1. El Burrito Sabanero featuring Oscar D'León
2. ¿Cómo Se Llega a Belén? featuring Franco De Vita
3. Gloria featuring Noel Schajris
4. Santa Claus Is Coming to Town featuring Mayré Martínez
5. Son Tan Buenos los Recuerdos featuring Andrés Cepeda
6. El Tamborilero featuring Horacio Blanco
7. Ven a Mi Casa Esta Navidad featuring Ricardo Montaner
8. Noche de Bien featuring Ilan Chester
9. Los Gaiteros featuring Neguito Borjas
10. Esos Ojos Que Me Miran featuring Marcos Witt
11. Burrito Mix featuring Pipo Ramirez Leo Colina y Oscar D'León

=== Compilation albums ===
==== Éxitos (2006) ====
1. Aunque Sea Poco
2. El Farolito
3. Pa' Que No Me Puedas Olvidar
4. Inexplicable
5. Virao
6. Un Pedacito de Tu Querer
7. Yo Sin Ti No Valgo Nada
8. Vas
9. Para Volver a Comenzar
10. Devuélveme Mi Amor
11. Ya No Estás Aquí
12. Cosita Rica
13. Niña Dura
14. Y Cómo Haré
15. Te Brindo
16. Di Que Voy a Hacer Contigo
17. Cuento Que Te Amo

==== Grandes Éxitos (2009) ====
1. Aunque Sea Poco
2. Devuélveme Mi Amor
3. Virao
4. Un Pedacito de Tu Querer
5. El Farolito
6. Yo Sin Ti No Valgo Nada
7. Vas
8. Y Cómo Haré
9. Segundo Plato
10. Cosita Rica
11. Te Brindo
12. Niña Dura
13. Te Enseño a Aterrizar
14. Para Volver a Comenzar
15. Di Qué Voy a Hacer Contigo
16. ¿Qué Me Has Hecho Tú?

==== Esika y Voz Veis Experience (2010) ====
1. La Mujer Que Llevas Dentro
2. Aunque Sea Poco
3. Segundo Plato
4. Jamás Se Dice Adiós
5. El Farolito
6. Tanto Swing
7. Niña Dura
8. ¿Qué Me Has Hecho Tú?
9. Te Enseño a Aterrizar
10. Cosita Rica
11. Un Pedacito de Tu Querer

=== Live albums ===
==== Acústico: Una Noche Común y Sin Corriente (2009) ====
1. Niña Dura
2. Segundo Plato
3. Somos Más
4. El Farolito
5. Dame Un Día
6. Aunque Sea Poco
7. Te Brindo
8. Ya No Estas Aquí
9. Vas
10. Amor Secreto
11. Un Pedacito de Tu Querer
12. The Glory of Love
13. Tan Cerca
14. Virao

== Awards ==
=== Latin Grammys ===
In 2007 at the 8th Annual Latin Grammy Awards, Voz Veis won both Best Latin Children Album, with Cómo Se Llega A Belén, and Best Short Form Music Video, with "Ven A Mi Casa Esta Navidad".

In 2010 at the 11th Annual Latin Grammy Awards, Voz Veis earned its 3rd Grammy after beating music other music artists such as Laura Pausini and Thalia in the "Best Long Form Music Video" for "Una Noche Común y Sin Corriente".
