= Las Letras Ya No Importan =

Studio album by Residente
- Released: February 22, 2024
- Genre: Latin rap
- Length: 94:26
- Language: Spanish
- Labels: Sony Latin; 5020
- Producers: Residente; Leo Genovese; Trooko; Acción Sánchez; Evlay; DJ Domingo; Rafa Arcaute; Vinylz

Residente chronology
| Residente (2017) | Las Letras Ya No Importan (2024) |

Singles from Las Letras Ya No Importan
- 1. "René" Released: February 27, 2020; 2. "This Is Not America" Released: March 17, 2022; 3. "Quiero Ser Baladista" Released: July 26, 2023; 4. "Problema Cabrón" Released: September 7, 2023; 5. "Ron en el Piso" Released: January 11, 2024; 6. "Pólvora de Ayer" Released: January 19, 2024; 7. "313" Released: February 20, 2024

Las Letras Ya No Importan (transl. The Lyrics No Longer Matter) is the second studio album by Puerto Rican rapper Residente, released on February 22, 2024, through Sony Music Latin and 5020 Records. It is Residente's first full-length project in almost seven years since the release of his debut solo album, Resīdεntә (2017).

The album was produced by Residente himself alongside Leo Genovese and Trooko. Acción Sánchez, Evlay, DJ Domingo, Rafa Arcaute and Vinylz also have production credits for individual songs. Sílvia Pérez Cruz, Penélope Cruz, SFDK, Nino Freestyle, Busta Rhymes, WOS, Amal Murkus, Ibeyi, AI2 El Aldeano, Christian Nodal, Rauw Alejandro, Arcángel, Vico C, Big Daddy Kane, Ricky Martin and Jessie Reyez, all appear as guest artists in the album.

It was supported by seven singles: "René", released in 2020; "This Is Not America", released in 2022; "Quiero Ser Baladista" and "Problema Cabrón", both released in 2023; and "Ron en el Piso", "Pólvora de Ayer" and "313", all three released in 2024. The album peaked at numbers 48 and 49 at the Spain Albums chart and the Top Latin Albums charts, respectively.

== Background ==
Residente, known as one of the members of the alternative hip-hop band Calle 13, released his solo debut album, Resīdεntә, in 2017, two years after the band went into an indefinite hiatus. The album was an exploration of his roots inspired in the results of a DNA test which revealed that said roots traced back to various locations around the world. This led to recording sessions in different countries and collaborations with multiple international artists.

After releasing several stand alone singles and collaborations, he released the song "René" in 2020, the song would eventually become the first single for his second studio album. He continued with various collaborations in the following years including "Residente: Bzrp Music Sessions, Vol. 49" in 2022 with Argentine producer Bizarrap to commercial success, charting in the Hot Latin Songs chart, as well as in Mexico and Spain, and topping the singles chart in Argentina. The song was also certified gold in Spain. The same year he released "This Is Not America" featuring Ibeyi, which would end up being the album's second single. Throughout 2023 and early 2024, he began releasing various singles, all for the album except "Bajo y Batería", a nine-minute "diss track" ("tiradera" in Spanish) towards Puerto Rican rapper Cosculluela. A line from the song later inspired "Quiero Ser Baladista", one of the singles for the album.

In February 2024, he announced the release of the album via Instagram. The post consisted of a short film featuring Spanish actress Najwa Nimri as a therapist that talks with Residente about his preoccupations with the current state of the music industry.

== Composition ==
The album consists of 23 tracks (including three short interludes), all of them written or co-written by Residente himself. He also serves as producer for most tracks alongside Leo Genovese and Trooko. Sonically, the album is mainly a Latin rap album, experimenting with other genres in some tracks such as the blues rock "Problema Cabrón", the "old school hip-hop" hommages "Estilo Libre" and "Cerebro", the more classical-oriented "313", the pop ballad "Quiero Ser Baladista", and the Palestinian music influenced "Bajo los Escombros".

Throughout the album, Residente discusses themes of loss and the pass of time. The album opener "Valentina" is an interlude consisting of a voice mail by Valentina, a friend of Residente who died before the recording of the album. She is alluded in the following track "313", a song inspired by her. According to Residente, the name of the song came after noticing the number 313 in various situations, a coincidence he took as a signal from her friend. Valentina's sister provides violins for the song. In the song, he reflects about life and the pass of time as well as his fear of growing old, which is also mentioned in the tracks "Yo No Se", featuring Spanish rap band SFDK, and the title track.

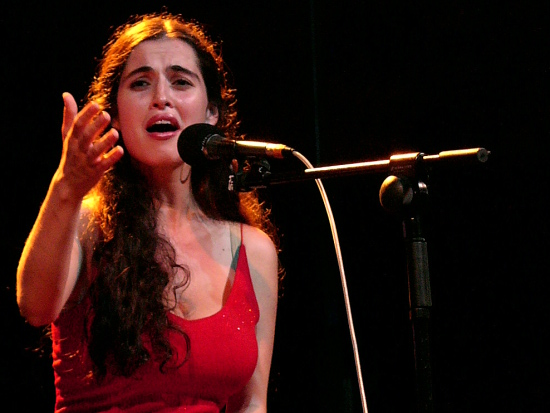
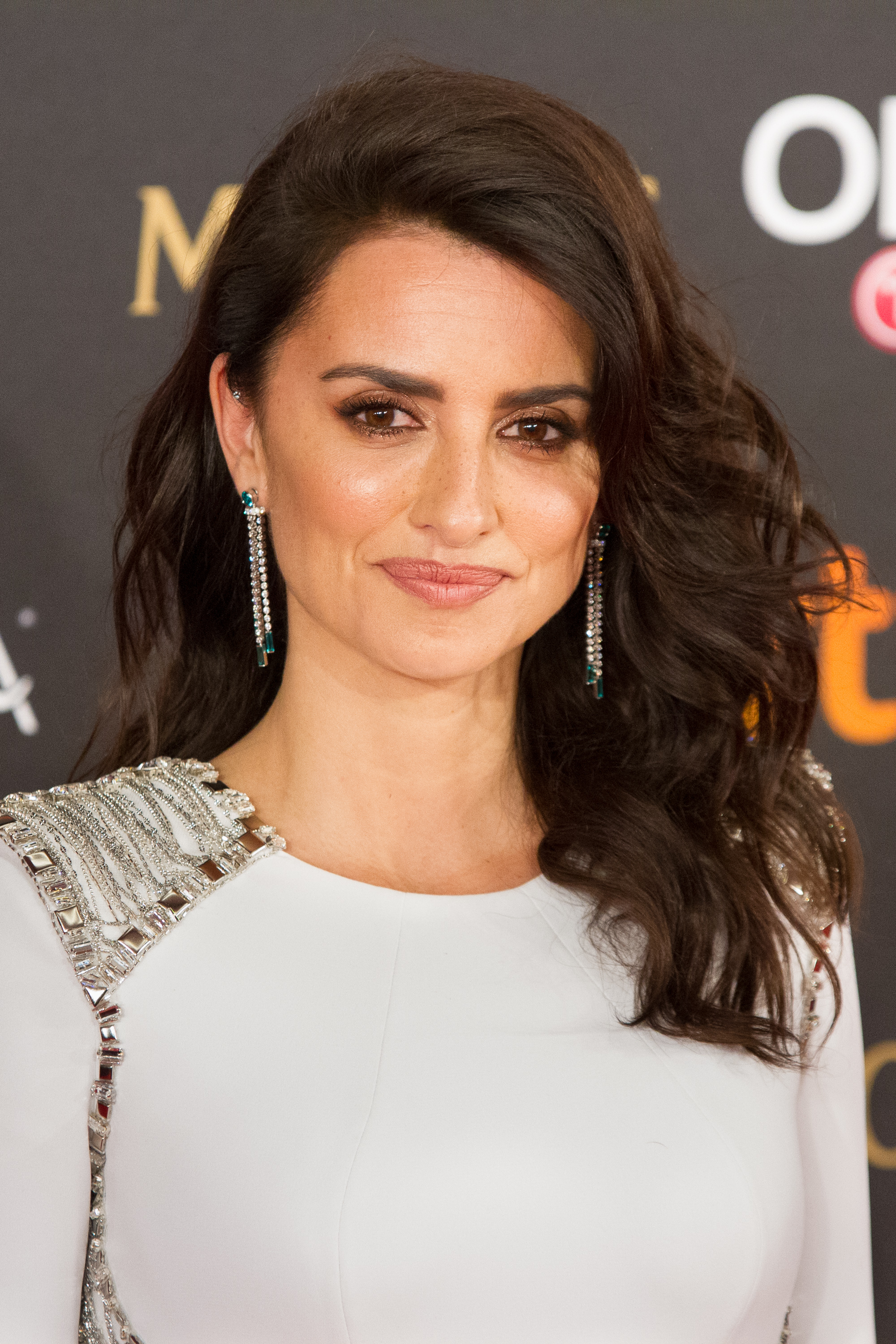
Singer Sílvia Pérez Cruz (left) and actress Penélope Cruz (right) appear twice in the album. Together in "313" and individually in "Artificial Inteligente" (Pérez Cruz) and "8" (Cruz).

The loss of loved ones is mentioned in tracks like the aforementioned "313" and "Ron en el Piso", an elegy for his cousin Julian, who died in 2021 after a drug overdose. In the latter, Residente raps about his status within the Latin music scene and his feelings around being called a "legend", while also commends Julian for supporting him during the early stages of his career. Similarly, in "René", the closing track, he reminisces about Christopher, a childhood friend who was killed by the police in Puerto Rico. The song talks about Residente's life and struggles, and features vocals from actress Flor Joglar de García (Residente's mother), who sings a lullaby at the beginning of the song, and Panamanian singer Rubén Blades.

More socially critical lyrics appear in the songs "En Talla" featuring Cuban rapper AI2 El Aldeano and "Bajo los Escombros" featuring Palestinian singer Amal Murkus. In the former, Residente denounces corruption from governments and marked parallels between the situation of Puerto Rico as an unincorporated territory of the United States and the repression in Cuba, while in the latter he raps about the war in Palestine and invites various Palestinian musicians to play in the song. Also, in the single "This Is Not America", he discusses the history of colonialism, slavery, and imperialism in Latin America, themes that are also represented in the music video for the song. The song title makes reference to Childish Gambino's song "This Is America", as well as the controversy surrounding the term "America", which in Spanish refers to the Americas but in English is used mainly for things or persons related to the United States. Finally, in the tracks "El Malestar de la Cultura" and "Artificial Inteligente", Residente expands on his thoughts on the music landscape and the advances in technology and specifically in artificial intelligence.

== Artwork ==
The album cover features a six-finger robotic hand approaching a human hand representing "the contrast between meaningful artisanal art versus today's algorithm-driven culture". It is meant as a critique towards the consequences of technology in the music industry, this as well as the obsession with commercial success and social media exposure is also discussed in tracks like "Ron en el Piso" and "Desde la Servilleta". The style of the cover is also reproduced in the covers for some of the singles and visualizers with each featuring the same half-robotic half-human hand holding several objects such as a melting ice cream, a rock, and a clock, among others.

== Promotion ==
=== Singles ===
The album's first single was "René", released on February 27, 2020. The song peaked at number 34 at the Hot Latin Songs chart in the United States. It also peaked at numbers 2 and 23 in Argentina and Spain, respectively. In Mexico, the song was certified 3× platinum, while in Spain, the song was certified gold. The music video for the song was directed by Residente himself, as with the rest of the music videos for the album except "This Is Not America". It was filmed in Trujillo Alto, Puerto Rico, Residente's childhood town.

Two years later, "This Is Not America" featuring French-Cuban duo Ibeyi was released as the second single on March 17, 2022. The music video was directed by Greg Ohrel and depicts several protests and historical events in the history of Latin America. In 2023, two more singles were released, "Quiero Ser Baladista" featuring Puerto Rican singer Ricky Martin on July 26, and "Problema Cabrón" featuring Argentine rapper Wos on September 7. The nine-minute music video for "Quiero Ser Baladista" depicts Residente as a rapper turned into a parody ballad-singer who kidnaps a music executive (played by Afo Verde, the CEO of Sony Music Latin). Conversely, the ten-minute video for "Problema Cabrón" features Residente and Wos as two criminal brothers. Actors Michelle Jenner, Sandra Escacena, Alberto Ammann, Darko Peric, Patrick Criado and Mario Rebollo, all appear in the music video. Both music videos were directed by Residente alongside Alejandro Pedrosa.

The remaining three singles were all released in 2024, "Ron en el Piso" on January 11, "Pólvora de Ayer" featuring Mexican singer Christian Nodal on January 19, and "313" featuring Spanish singer Sílvia Pérez Cruz and Spanish actress Penélope Cruz on February 20. The music video for "Ron en el Piso" was produced by 1868 Studios, Zapatero Flims and World Junkies, and makes a review of Residente's career from his beginnings as a part of the band Calle 13 to his solo efforts, as well various significant people in his life. Puerto Rican beauty queen and Residente's ex-girlfriend Denise Quiñones appears in the video. Finally, the music video for "313" was filmed at Granda de San Ildefonso in Spain and features Residente and Penélope Cruz as they sing to each other while a group of dancers surrounds them.

== Reception ==
=== Critical reception ===
Professional ratings
Review scores
| Source | Rating |
|---|---|
| Jenesaispop | 3.5/5 stars |
| Mondo Sonoro | 8/10 |

Yeray Ibarra from Mondo Sonoro rated the album and 8 out of 10, praising the contributions of Nino Freestyle, WOS, Busta Rhymes and Rauw Alejandro as well as the emotionality of tracks like "313", "El Encuentro" and "Que Fluya", though she questioned the length of the album. Jordi Bardají from Jenesaispop gave the album three and a half stars out of five commending Residente's honest lyrics and highlighting "This Is Not America" as a high point in the album.

=== Accolades ===
At the 21st Annual Latin Grammy Awards in 2020, "René" was nominated for both Record of the Year and Song of the Year, winning the latter. Additionally, the same year, he was nominated for Best Urban Fusion/Performance for "Cántalo", a collaboration with Ricky Martin and Bad Bunny, and won Best Rap/Hip Hop Song for "Antes Que El Mundo Se Acabe", becoming the inaugural winner of the category. Two years later, at the 23rd Annual Latin Grammy Awards in 2022, "This Is Not America" was nominated for Best Urban Fusion/Performance and won Best Short Form Music Video, being his sixth win (including four as a part of Calle 13), furthering his record as the artist with most wins in the category.

== Track listing ==
Las Letras Ya No Importan track listing
| No. | Title | Writer(s) | Producer(s) | Length |
|---|---|---|---|---|
| 1. | "Valentina" | René Pérez Joglar | Residente | 0:38 |
| 2. | "313" (with Sílvia Pérez Cruz and Penélope Cruz) | Pérez Joglar; Leo Genovese; Sílvia Pérez Cruz | Residente; Leo Genovese | 6:07 |
| 3. | "El Malestar en la Cultura" | Pérez Joglar; Genovese | Residente | 2:29 |
| 4. | "Yo No Sé Pero Sé" (with SFDK) | Pérez Joglar; Jeffrey Peñalva; Óscar Sánchez; Saturnino Rey García | Residente; Trooko; Acción Sánchez | 5:43 |
| 5. | "Jerga Platanera" (with Nino Freestyle) | Pérez Joglar; Yeifry Severino | Residente | 4:21 |
| 6. | "Cerebro" (with Busta Rhymes) | Pérez Joglar; Peñalva; Trevor Smith | Trooko | 4:25 |
| 7. | "Problema Cabrón" (with WOS) | Pérez Joglar; Peñalva; Facundo Nahuel Yalve; Valentín Oliva | Residente; Trooko; Evlay | 3:36 |
| 8. | "Bajo los Escombros" (with Amal Murkus) | Pérez Joglar; Genovese; Firas Zreik | Residente; Leo Genovese | 4:37 |
| 9. | "This Is Not America" (featuring Ibeyi) | Pérez Joglar; Peñalva; Lisa-Kaindé Diaz; Naomi Diaz | Residente | 3:51 |
| 10. | "En Talla" (with AI2 El Aldeano) | Pérez Joglar; Aldo Rodríguez | Residente | 6:14 |
| 11. | "Pólvora de Ayer" (with Christian Nodal) | Pérez Joglar; Christian González | Residente | 3:27 |
| 12. | "Sin Lú" (with Rauw Alejandro) | Pérez Joglar; Peñalva; Raúl Ocasio Ruiz; Jorge Pizarro | Trooko | 3:30 |
| 13. | "Que Fluya" (with Arcángel) | Pérez Joglar; Peñalva; Austin Santos | Residente; Trooko | 4:22 |
| 14. | "Estilo Libre" (with Vico C and Big Daddy Kane) | Pérez Joglar; Peñalva; Antonio Hardy; Luis Lozada; Domingo Gómez; Richard Colón | Trooko; DJ Domingo | 3:36 |
| 15. | "Quiero Ser Baladista" (with Ricky Martin) | Pérez Joglar; Rafa Arcaute; Elias Meister | Residente; Rafa Arcaute | 5:42 |
| 16. | "El Encuentro" (with Jessie Reyez) | Pérez Joglar; Peñalva; Jessica Reyez | Residente; Trooko | 3:07 |
| 17. | "Leoni" | Pérez Joglar | Residente | 0:34 |
| 18. | "Ron en el Piso" | Pérez Joglar; Genovese; Anderson Hernández | Residente; Vinylz | 5:35 |
| 19. | "Artificial Inteligente" (with Sílvia Pérez Cruz) | Pérez Joglar; Genovese | Residente | 5:14 |
| 20. | "Desde la Servilleta" | Pérez Joglar; Genovese | Residente | 3:23 |
| 21. | "8" | Pérez Joglar | Residente | 0:10 |
| 22. | "Las Letras Ya No Importan" | Pérez Joglar | Residente | 5:58 |
| 23. | "René" | Pérez Joglar | Residente | 7:38 |
| Total length: | | | | 94:26 |

== Charts ==
Weekly chart performance for Las Letras Ya No Importan
| Chart (2024) | Peak position |
|---|---|
| Spanish Albums (Promusicae) | 48 |
| US Top Latin Albums (Billboard) | 49 |
| US Latin Rhythm Albums (Billboard) | 24 |
