= Class 313 =

Class 313 may refer to:

- 313 series, an electric train type operated in Japan
- British Rail Class 313, a dual-voltage electric train type, formerly operated in the UK
- Renfe Class 313, a diesel locomotive type formerly operated in Spain

== See also ==
- 313 (disambiguation)
