= This Is Not America (Residente song) =

Single by Residente featuring Ibeyi

from the album Las Letras Ya No Importan
- Language: Spanish
- Released: March 17, 2022
- Genre: Urbano; Latin rap; political hip-hop; conscious hip-hop; bomba
- Length: 3:52
- Label: Sony Latin
- Songwriters: René Pérez; Naomi Diaz; Lisa-Kaindé Diaz; Jeffrey Peñalva (Trooko)
- Producer: René Pérez

Music video
- "This Is Not America" on YouTube

"This Is Not America" is a song by Puerto Rican rapper Residente featuring French-Cuban duo Ibeyi. It was released on March 17, 2022, through Sony Latin, as the second single from the former's second studio album Las Letras Ya No Importan.

The song was noted for its lyrics that portray different Latin American cultures throughout history, including colonialism, slavery, as well as imperialism, the term "America", and historical and political events that occurred in Latin America. The song was also known for its mention of Childish Gambino related to his song "This Is America". A music video was released on the same day, graphically portraying several of the lyrics in the song, as well as events that occurred on the continents during its history, such as the protests that occurred in various countries of the region.

== Composition ==
The song is a brainchild of Residente's work with professors at Yale University and New York University, where they studied Residente's brain waves along with the brain patterns of worms, mice, monkeys, flies, and others, to create musical frequencies that would become rhythms. Residente's work with universities began for the creation of his second solo album. For this song, Residente used his own brain waves and the brain waves of worms to develop emphatic waves of electronica mixed with his rapping, Ibeyi's voice and Puerto Rican percussion.

== Lyrics ==
The lyrics portray different facts about Latin American culture throughout history, including colonialism, slavery, as well as criticism of imperialism, the meaning and usage of the term "America" and some of the dictatorships that occurred in the 70s and 80s in South America.

The song mentions 2Pac (real name Tupac Shakur), one of the most famous rappers in the United States. In an interview with Genius, Residente said about the mention that "you all admire Tupac like I do and his name comes from Peru" referring to the fact that Tupac was named after Túpac Amaru II, the descendant of the last Incan ruler, who was executed in Peru in 1781 after his failed revolt against the Spanish rule.

The term "America" is also discussed in the song, with Residente rapping that "America is not just the USA. It's from Tierra del Fuego to Canada. You've got to be really gross, really hollow. It's like saying that Africa is just Morocco". During his interview with Genius, Residente mentions that when he went to the United States, as a Latino, he was uncomfortable with the fact that they used the term to refer only to the country. Affirming that this did not bother him or offend him, but only made him uncomfortable, he said that he felt like "Man, these people think they are the center of the world".

The lyrics of the song also mention gangs, immigration, murdered journalists, economic depressions, drug trafficking, police brutality, false positive cases in Colombia, "5 presidents in 11 days", people in exile, as well as various other topics.

Childish Gambino was mentioned directly in the song while his similar song, "This Is America" is mentioned indirectly by Residente, generating some controversy. Residente mentioned on the subject stating that he is a fan of Gambino, and that when he was going to launch "This Is America", he at first thought that "this was going to be over the whole continent". "This Is America" discusses police violence in the United States, the racism across the nation, as well as shootings and gun violence. Residente noted that these issues mentioned in the song were "super necessary, but at the same time, I thought that there were a lot of things he didn't cover about [the American continent], so I said 'why don't I cover what's missing and put it out there'".

== Music video ==
A music video was released on March 17, 2022. It was directed by Greg Ohrel, and produced by Doomsday Entertainment and Mastodonte.

Sony Music Latin said that it "shares the message the cultures and countries of the American continent are one" and urges "not to separate and create an evolution for unity".

The video begins with a map of the United States, which is then almost obscured by a text that says "This Is Not America", made by Chilean Alfredo Jaar, which was placed in New York City in 1987, with the name "A Logo for America". Later, a woman acting as Lolita Lebrón shoots three times into the sky in the video before being arrested. Lebrón was a Puerto Rican nationalist who was convicted of attempted murder and other crimes after carrying out an armed attack on the United States Capitol in 1954, which resulted in the wounding of five members of the United States Congress.

Residente begins to rap in the middle of a brawl of people protesting and, in turn, clashing with the police. During the video, some protesters carry the flags of Brazil, Puerto Rico, Venezuela, the United States, Mexico and Colombia. Some scenes show a woman breastfeeding her child through the fence that separates the United States from Mexico; a scene depicting the execution of Túpac Amaru II; scenes countering elements of capitalism (represented in the video as Starbucks and Amazon) with images of indigenous children or pre-Columbian monuments in first world settings; the representation of one of the most emblematic photographs of the strike in Bogotá in 2021, Francisco Martinez, a juggler who used machetes (which some accounts claimed were toys) who was killed by the Carabineros in Chile; the shoe shine cultural revolution in Bolivia; the guerrillas, drug traffickers and favelas; the 43 students who disappeared in Ayotzinapa; as well as the strong offensive by agents in the favelas before the 2014 World Cup in Brazil. Several of the references were compared by users on Twitter. Jair Bolsonaro, then president of Brazil, is introduced by a double eating an expensive meal in front of an aboriginal girl and wiping his mouth with the flag of his country. Regarding these images, the musician explained that: “He could have parodied many other political leaders who have been committing atrocities, but Bolsonaro has something particular and if I have to imagine someone wiping their mouth with the flag, it is surely him. Bolsonaro burned the entire Amazon. He represents the destruction of the continent".

After the lyrics "Gambino my brother, this is America" is heard, a scene is shown, which can be compared to the scene at the beginning of the This Is America music video, but it is mainly depicting the murder of Victor Jara, a Chilean musician who was tortured and later executed by the Chilean military shortly after the 1973 US-supported coup in that country in the Chile Stadium (now Victor Jara Stadium). The last scenes represent once again the protests that took place in the region, this time, being those of Venezuela in 2017, where a protester who had an accident due to a Molotov cocktail and caught fire is represented, and the protests of Colombia in 2021, where a street performance is represented in the video showing a dead person being covered by the Colombian flag by the police. An injured girl is later being dragged towards a group of people, also on the ground, surrounded by police, where it is later shown a palenquera woman (with her clothing representing the Colombian flag upside down, as a symbol of the protests in the country) observing the events with indignation. The video ends in an upward shot showing the word "AMERICA" made with the bodies of the protesters.

The video has 23 million views and 1.3 million likes on YouTube, as of January 16, 2023.

=== Awards ===
It won multiple awards, including Best Short Form Music Video at the 2022 Latin Grammys, Cannes Lions 2022 Grand Prix in the Entertainment For Music category, Best Music Video in the 2022 AICP Awards, Special Jury Award for Music Video at the 2023 SXSW Film Awards, and Best Music Video at the 2022 Berlin Music Video Awards.
