= 313 (disambiguation) =

313 is a year of the Julian calendar.

313 may also refer to:

- 313 BC, a year of the pre-Julian Roman calendar
- 313 (album), a 2006 album by Phideaux Xavier
- "313" (song), a 2024 song by Residente
- Area code 313, a telephone code for Detroit in the North American Numbering Plan
- British Rail Class 313, a type of train
- 313 Chaldaea, a main-belt asteroid
- Frame 313, part of the Zapruder film, showing the fatal shot to President Kennedy
- 313, the name of Donald Duck's car in Disney comics
- 313@Somerset, a shopping mall in Orchard Road
- "313", a song by Eminem from Infinite
