= Americas (terminology) =

Geographical term

Subdivisions of the Americas
Map	Legend
	North America (NA) South America (SA) May be included in either NA or SA
	North America (NA) May be included in NA Central America Caribbean South America
	North America (NA) May be included in NA Northern America Middle America (MA) Caribbean (may be included in MA) South America (SA) May be included in MA or SA
	Anglo-America (A-A) May be included in A-A or in LA Latin America (LA) May be included in LA

The Americas, also known as America, are lands of the Western Hemisphere, composed of numerous entities and regions variably defined by geography, politics, and culture.

The Americas are recognized in the English-speaking world to include two separate continents: North America and South America. In parts of Europe and Latin America, America is considered to be a single continent, within which North and South America are subcontinents.

== Physical geography ==
- North America—the continent and associated islands of the Northern Hemisphere and (chiefly) Western Hemisphere. It lies northwest of South America and is bounded by the Atlantic, Arctic, and Pacific Oceans.
  - Middle America—the territory between the southern Rocky Mountains and the northern tip of the Andes. This isthmus marks the transition between North and South America. It may also include the Caribbean.
    - Central America—the narrow southern portion of mainland North America connecting with South America, extending from the Isthmus of Tehuantepec to the Isthmus of Panama; alternatively, the Trans-Mexican Volcanic Belt may delimit the region on the north.
    - Caribbean—the region between southeastern North America and northern South America, consisting of the Caribbean Sea, its islands (most of which enclose the sea), and the surrounding coasts. The islands—composed of the Greater Antilles, Lesser Antilles, and Lucayan Archipelago—are also known as the West Indies (or, in some languages, the Antilles).
- South America—the continent and associated islands of the Western Hemisphere. It is chiefly in the Southern Hemisphere and lies between the Atlantic and Pacific Oceans, southeast of North America.

== Human geography ==
=== Geographical or geopolitical regions ===
- North America—when used to denote less than the entire North American continent, contains Canada, Mexico, and the United States, and the dependencies of Bermuda (U.K.), Greenland (Denmark), and Saint Pierre and Miquelon (France). Occasionally, this refers to just Canada and the United States together.
- Middle America—Mexico and the nations of Central America; often also includes the West Indies. Occasionally, Colombia and Venezuela are also included in Middle America.
  - Central America—the southern region of the North American continent, comprising Belize, Guatemala, El Salvador, Honduras, Nicaragua, Costa Rica, and Panama. Sometimes, Central America may be defined to only include the five countries which gained independence as the United Provinces of Central America. This definition excludes Belize and Panama.
  - West Indies—the island territories of the Caribbean.
- South America—contains the nations of Argentina, Bolivia, Brazil, Chile, Colombia, Ecuador, Guyana, Paraguay, Peru, Suriname, Uruguay, and Venezuela, and the French overseas department of French Guiana. Also includes the insular territories of the Falkland Islands (U.K.), the South Georgia and the South Sandwich Islands (U.K.), Fernando de Noronha (Brazil), Trindade and Martim Vaz (Brazil), the Galápagos Islands (Ecuador), and the Juan Fernández Islands (Chile).
- Middle America (United States)—Middle America may also refer to the midwestern United States or the middle-class segment of the U.S. population.

=== United Nations geoscheme ===
United Nations geoscheme for the Americas
Caribbean Central America Northern America South America

- Northern America—the northern region of the North American continent, including Canada, the United States, Greenland, Saint-Pierre and Miquelon, and Bermuda.
- Latin America and the Caribbean-extending from The Bahamas and Mexico to Argentina and Chile.
- Central America—the countries south of Mexico and north of Colombia.
- The Caribbean.
- South America—all the countries south of Panama.

Within this scheme, the continent of America includes Northern America, Central America, the Caribbean and South America.

=== Political divisions ===
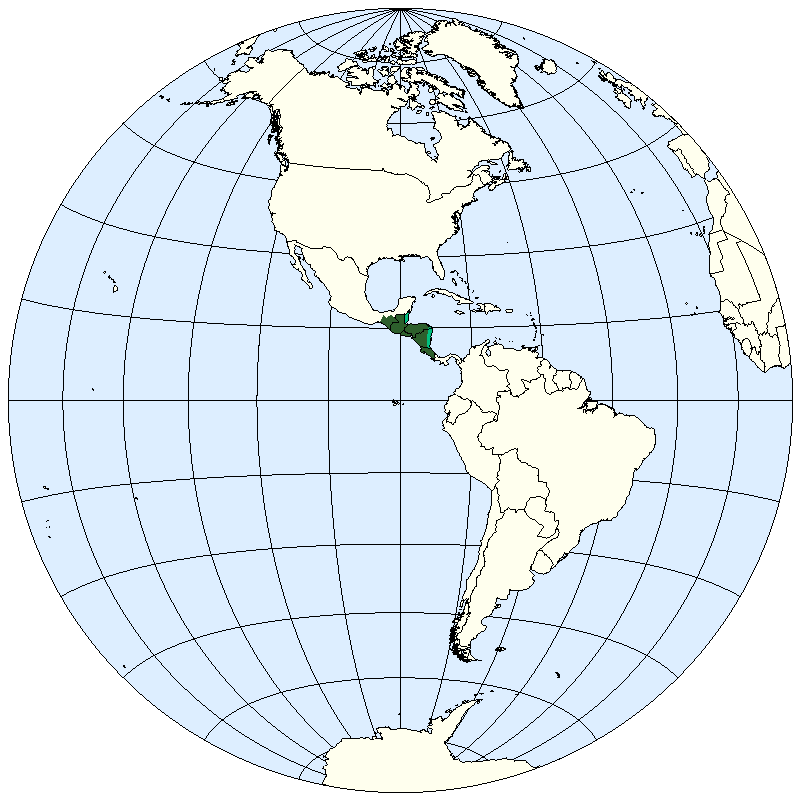
Federal Republic of Central America (1823-1840)

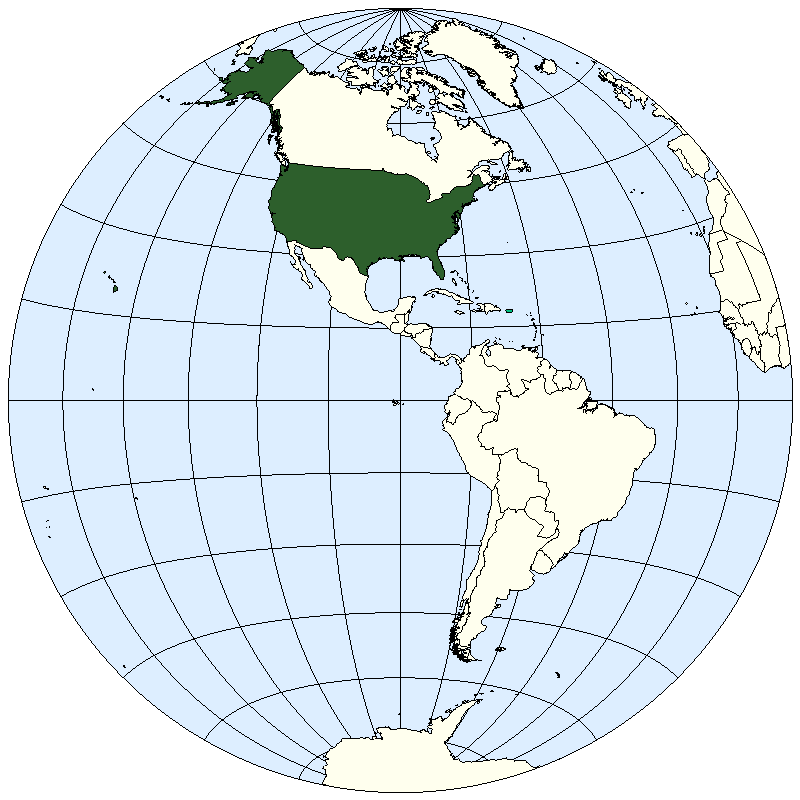
United States of America

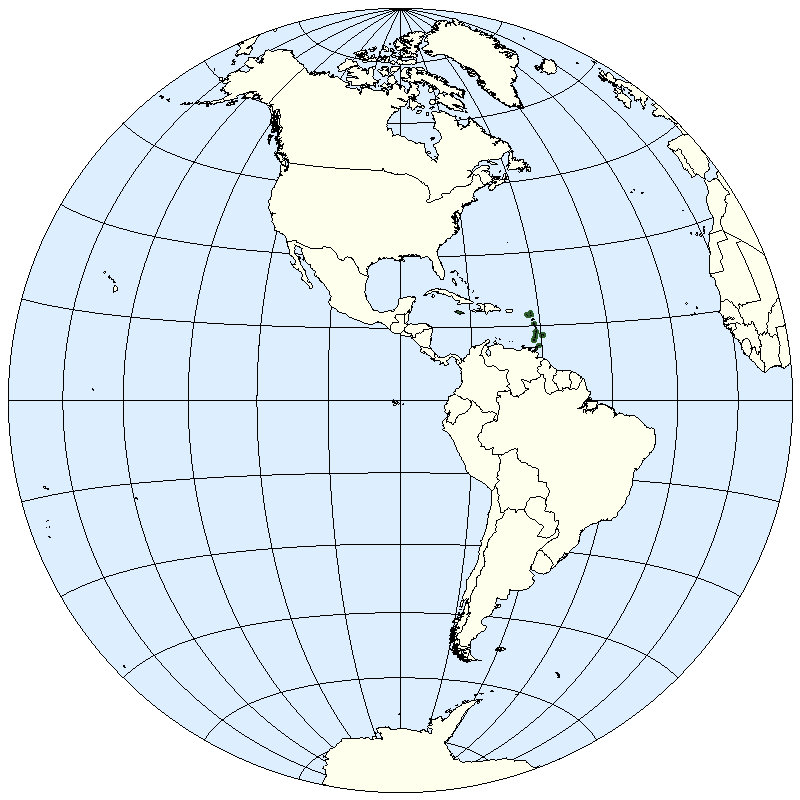
West Indies Federation (1958-1962)

- British America—former designation for British possessions in the Americas.
- British North America—former designation for territories in North America colonised by Great Britain in the 18th and 19th centuries, particularly after 1783 and in reference to Canada. At the start of the American Revolution in 1775, the British Empire in North America included twenty colonies north of Mexico. In 1783, the Treaty of Paris ended the American Revolution and established boundaries between the United States and British North America; East Florida and West Florida were also ceded to Spain in the treaty, and then ceded by Spain to the US in 1819. From 1867 to 1873, all but one of the remaining colonies of British North America confederated (through a series of eponymous acts) into the Dominion of Canada. Newfoundland joined Canada in 1949.
- British West Indies—the islands and territories of the Caribbean under British colonial influence.
- Federal Republic of Central America—formerly the United Provinces of Central America, a federal republic in Central America from 1823 to 1840 comprising the newly independent Spanish territories: Costa Rica, El Salvador, Guatemala, Honduras, Nicaragua, and (later) Los Altos. In 1838, the federation succumbed to civil war and dissolved.
- Northern America (América Septentrional)-the first official name of Mexico.
  - Mexican America (América Mexicana)-a name chosen and drafted in the first Mexican constitution.
- United Provinces of South America, denomination of Argentina during the early developments of the Argentine War of Independence, and official denomination of the country as per the 1819 Constitution (rejected 1820).
- United States of America—a federal republic in North America founded in 1776 and comprising 50 states (one of which, Hawaii, is not considered to be located in North America) and one federal district (the District of Columbia), with several outlying territories of varying affiliation; commonly referred to as the U.S. or simply America.
- West Indies Federation—a federation of several Caribbean island colonies and territories of the United Kingdom (see also: British West Indies) from 1958 to 1962. This was followed by the West Indies Associated States, a smaller, looser polity, from 1967 to 1981.

=== Linguistic/cultural regions ===
- Anglo-America—the region of the Americas having significant historical, linguistic, and cultural links to England or the British Isles, i.e., Anglophone; often just Canada and the United States.
- Latin America—the region of the Americas where Romance languages derived from Latin–namely Spanish, Portuguese, and variably French–are officially or primarily spoken. Though French is spoken in Quebec, it is typically not included due to Canada's links to Britain.
  - Ibero-America—the region of the Americas having significant historical, linguistic, and cultural links to Spain or Portugal (both on the Iberian Peninsula), i.e., Hispanophone and Lusophone.
    - Hispanic America (also Spanish America)—those countries inhabited by Spanish-speaking populations.
  - French America—the Francophone region.
- Mesoamerica—a region of the Americas extending from central Mexico southeast to Nicaragua and Costa Rica; a term used especially in archaeology and ethnohistory for the region where an array of civilizations had flourished during the pre-Columbian era, and which shared a number of historical and cultural traditions.
  - Mesoamerican Linguistic Area—a sprachbund, or linguistic region, defined as the area inhabited by speakers of a set of indigenous languages which have developed certain similarities as a result of their historic and geographical connections; roughly co-terminate with the archaeological/ethnohistorical Mesoamerica.
- Aridoamerica—an archaeological/ethnohistorical regional division, essentially comprising the arid/semi-arid northern portion of present-day Mexico, whose historical peoples are generally characterized by a nomadic existence and minimal reliance on agriculture.
- Oasisamerica—an occasionally used archaeological/ethnohistorical term for a (pre-Columbian) cultural region of North America.

== See also ==
- American (word)
- Naming of the Americas
- Columbia (name)
- Supercontinent, subcontinent, microcontinent, and continental shelf
- Region, subregion, and trade block
- Geography
  - Physical geography
  - Political geography and geopolitics
  - Human geography and regional science

== Sources ==
- The Columbia Gazetteer of the World Online. 2005. New York: Columbia University Press (proprietary; limited access).
- Merriam-Webster's Collegiate Dictionary, 11th ed. 2003. (ISBN 0-87779-809-5) New York: Merriam-Webster, Inc.
- Oxford English Reference Dictionary, 2nd ed. (rev.) 2002. (ISBN 0-19-860652-4) Oxford, UK: Oxford University Press.
- What's the difference between North, Latin, Central, Middle, South, Spanish and Anglo America?.. Geography at about.com.
- Map of North a Middle America
