= René (song) =

2020 song by Residente

Single by Residente

from the album Las Letras Ya No Importan
- Released: February 27, 2020
- Genre: Conscious hip-hop; worldbeat; spoken word; sadcore
- Length: 7:38
- Label: Sony Latin
- Songwriter: René Pérez Joglar
- Producer: René Pérez Joglar

Residente singles chronology
"Afilando Los Cuchillos" (2019)	"René" (2020)	"Antes Que El Mundo Se Acabe" (2020)

"René (Edición Cuarentena)" single cover

Music video
- "René" on YouTube

"René" is a single by Puerto Rican rapper Residente. It was released on February 27, 2020, through Sony Music Latin, as the lead single from his second studio album Las Letras Ya No Importan (2024). It features vocals by Residente's mother Puerto Rican actress Flor Joglar de García and Panamanian singer Rubén Blades. A music video for the song was released the same day. The song lyrics are about Residente's personal life and history.

A version called "René (Edición Cuarentena)" (Quarantine Edition) was released on May 8, and its music video was published previously on April 14.

"René" peaked at number 2 in the Argentina Hot 100 chart and at number 23 in Spain and number 34 in Billboard's Hot Latin Songs.

== Background ==
Residente started writing "René" in a hotel in Mexico two years before its publication (c. 2018) while he was about to give a concert. He stated "I was at the hotel on the 25th floor, and I wanted to jump off the balcony", then he called his mother, who was able to calm him down; the next day he started writing "René". Nevertheless, he stated that he was not yet prepared to release the song.

A music video was released along with the single on February 27, 2020, in which he is the director himself. He said it was difficult to be concentrated for rapping, so after drinking some beers he could forget the production crew, "That's the take that is there", he stated.

Another music video was released on April 14 called "René (Edición Cuarentena)". The single was released on May 8.

== Lyrics ==
The song lyrics is about Residente's personal life, childhood, and decisive points in his life. Residente interprets different events of his life: the murder of "Christopher", one of his childhood best friends, his divorce process with Argentinian model Soledad Fandiño, the insult he made to Governor of Puerto Rico Luis Fortuño in Los Premios MTV Latinoamérica 2009, his childhood memories about his hometown Trujillo Alto and his family, among other topics. Residente stated that writing "René" helped him to overcome his previous depressive state.

== Music video ==
The music video was directed by Residente himself and was filmed in the first week of February in his childhood town Trujillo Alto, Puerto Rico. The clip begins with images of several places in the town. Then Residente starts singing in a baseball field, following the camera and watching it directly while interchanging images referring to the lyrics. At the end of the video, Residente carries his son Milo, then photographs of his childhood are shown and the video finishes with aerial shots of Trujillo Alto. The clip has received more than 400 million views on YouTube, as of November 2025.

An additional clip, known as "Edición Cuarentena" (Quarantine edition), was recorded as a video call and released on April 14, which shows Residente, his mother Flor Joglar, Rubén Blades, and several musicians interpreting the song. It has received more than 30 million views on YouTube, as of August 2021.

== Personnel ==
Credits adapted from Tidal.

Vocals

- Residente – lead vocals
- Rubén Blades – vocals
- Flor Joglar de García – vocals

Musicians

- Leo Genovese – piano
- Daniel Díaz – conga
- Edgar Abraham – arrangements

Production

- Residente – production
- Ted Jensen – mastering
- Beatriz Artola – mixing
- Carlos Velazquez – recording
- Phil Joly – recording
- Oriana Hidalgo – A&R coordinatoion
- Rafa Arcaute – A&R direction

== Charts and certifications ==
=== Charts ===
Chart (2020)	Peak position
Argentina Hot 100 (Billboard)	2
Spain (PROMUSICAE)	23
US Hot Latin Songs (Billboard)	34

=== Certifications ===
Region	Certification	Certified units/sales
Mexico (AMPROFON)	3× Platinum	180,000^{‡}
^{‡} Sales+streaming figures based on certification alone.
