= CP Class 1320 =

Class of Spanish diesel locomotive

Class 1320
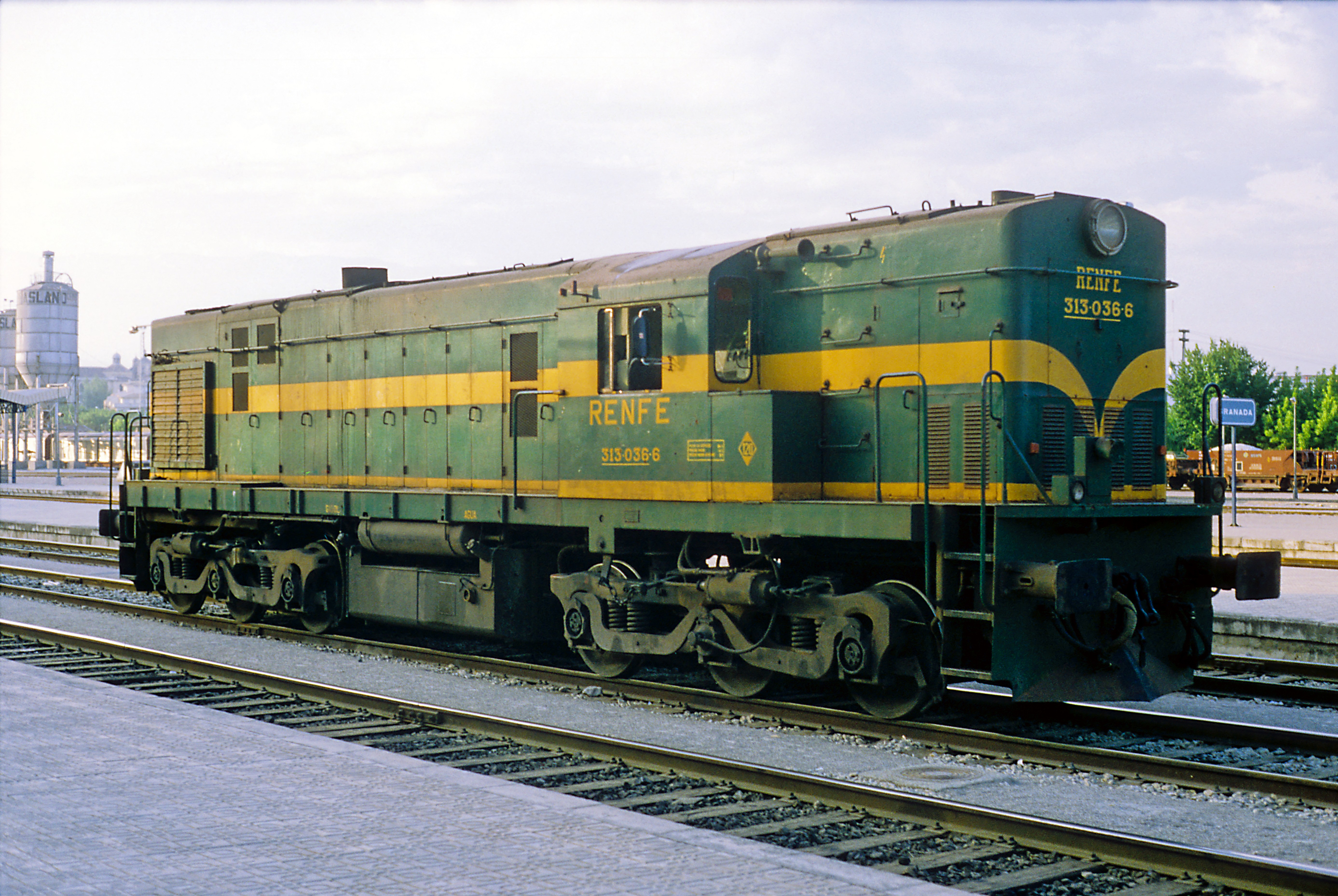
- A Renfe Class 313 at Granada in 1993. Surplus Class 313s were exported from Spain to Portugal, becoming the CP Série 1320.
Type and origin
- Builder: Euskalduna
Specifications
Career
- Operators: Comboios de Portugal (second-hand from Renfe)
- Class: Série 1320
- Locale: Portugal
- Delivered: 1989
- Withdrawn: 1997

The Série 1320 were a class of diesel locomotives used by Portuguese Railways (CP). All have now been withdrawn from service.

== History ==
The 1320s were originally built under license by Euskalduna for the state railways of Spain (Renfe) in the mid 1960s as the Renfe Class 1300, later renumbered as the Class 313. In 1989 eighteen units were purchased secondhand by CP. Ten of the fifty units of the Renfe Class 1300 were built by Alco, the original designer. Only license built version were exported to Portugal.

In Portuguese service they were repainted in CP's corporate orange livery.

17 of the class were withdrawn in 1997.

Locomotive 1331 is preserved by the AREMAF in Villaverde Bajo in Madrid where they now have plans to restore 1331 back to its original appearance as a Renfe Class 1300 back to 313.030.
