= Aldo Rodríguez =

Aldo El Aldeano
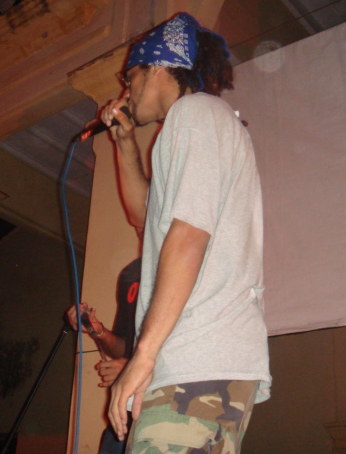
- Aldo performing when he was a member of the group Los Aldeanos.

Background information
- Also known as: El Aldeano
- Born: Aldo Roberto Baquero; Havana, Cuba
- Genre: Hip-hop
- Occupation: Rapper
- Instrument: Vocals
- Years active: 2003–present
- Label: EGREM (2003–2009)
- Formerly of: Los Aldeanos (2003–2016)

Aldo Roberto Rodríguez Baquero (born March 17, 1983 in Havana) is a Cuban rapper and hip-hop artist, and former member of the group Los Aldeanos. They are one of the most influential underground rap groups in Cuba. Rodriguez' lyrics deal with social injustices, poverty, racism, police brutality, and prostitution in Cuba.

== Drama between Osmani García ==
On August 17, 2020, Aldo went to meet with Osmani García to smooth things out as they had been sending each other insults for the past couple of months. The meeting ended up in a brawl that was stopped by local authorities.
