= Antes Que El Mundo Se Acabe =

2020 song by Residente

Single by Residente
- Released: May 14, 2020
- Recorded: April 2020
- Length: 4:10 (single version); 7:40 (music video version)
- Label: Sony Music Latin
- Songwriter: René Pérez Joglar
- Producer: René Pérez Joglar

Residente singles chronology
"René" (2020)	"Antes Que El Mundo Se Acabe" (2020)	"Hoy" (2020)

Music video
- "Antes Que El Mundo Se Acabe" on YouTube

"Antes Que El Mundo Se Acabe" is a single by Puerto Rican rapper Residente released on May 14, 2020, through Sony Music Latin. A music video for the song was released the same day, which features Residente's friends and several famous personalities from around the world kissing with their partners.

It peaked at number 92 in the Argentina Hot 100 chart.

== Background ==
While being in quarantine because of COVID-19 pandemic, Residente explained that the next song to be released after "René" would be a party song, but then he thought "I don’t even feel like partying right now". Around April 2020, he had the idea of the song, as he stated in an interview: "I got this idea of having a chain of kisses around the world. I thought, this is probably simple but I'd have to write a whole new song for this video. The [idea] was to have a chain of kisses around the world from all social classes".

Residente began the recording and production of "Antes Que El Mundo Se Acabe" by himself at home, along with its music video, and said there were a lot of difficulties in the process: "I thought was going to be easy because it was just a kiss. But the difficult thing is to find all of these people wanting to kiss during a pandemic and a kiss maybe looks easy but it was very complicated and not everyone kisses. I spoke with friends that were willing to kiss for the video and also started talking to people directly on Instagram. I spoke with more than 100 people for this and explained to them that it has to be recorded with a camera and if they didn't have a camera it could be with a phone but it has to be horizontal. It was very complicated."

Residente stated that when the song was finished, he needed a longer version in order to include all the kisses.

== Music video ==
The music video was directed by Residente himself. The clip begins with Residente and his wife kissing, followed by kisses of several famous couples. The clip has received more than 31 million views on YouTube, as of October 18, 2020.

== Personnel ==
Credits adapted from Tidal.

Vocals

- Residente – lead vocals
- Alune Wade – vocals
- Arooj Aftab – vocals
- Ganavya Doraiswamy – vocals
- Hassan Hakmoun – vocals

Musicians

- Agustin Uriburu – cello
- Leonor Falcón – viola
- Sara Caswell – violin
- Rajna Swaminathan – drums
- Justin Purtill – guitar
- Leo Genovese – piano, arrangements
- Thomas Pridgen – snare drum

Production

- Residente – production, recording
- Ted Jensen – mastering
- Beatriz Artola – mixing

== Charts ==
Chart (2020)	Peak position
Argentina Hot 100 (Billboard)	92
