= Renfe Class 313 =

Class of Spanish diesel-electric locomotive

Renfe 313 Renfe 1300
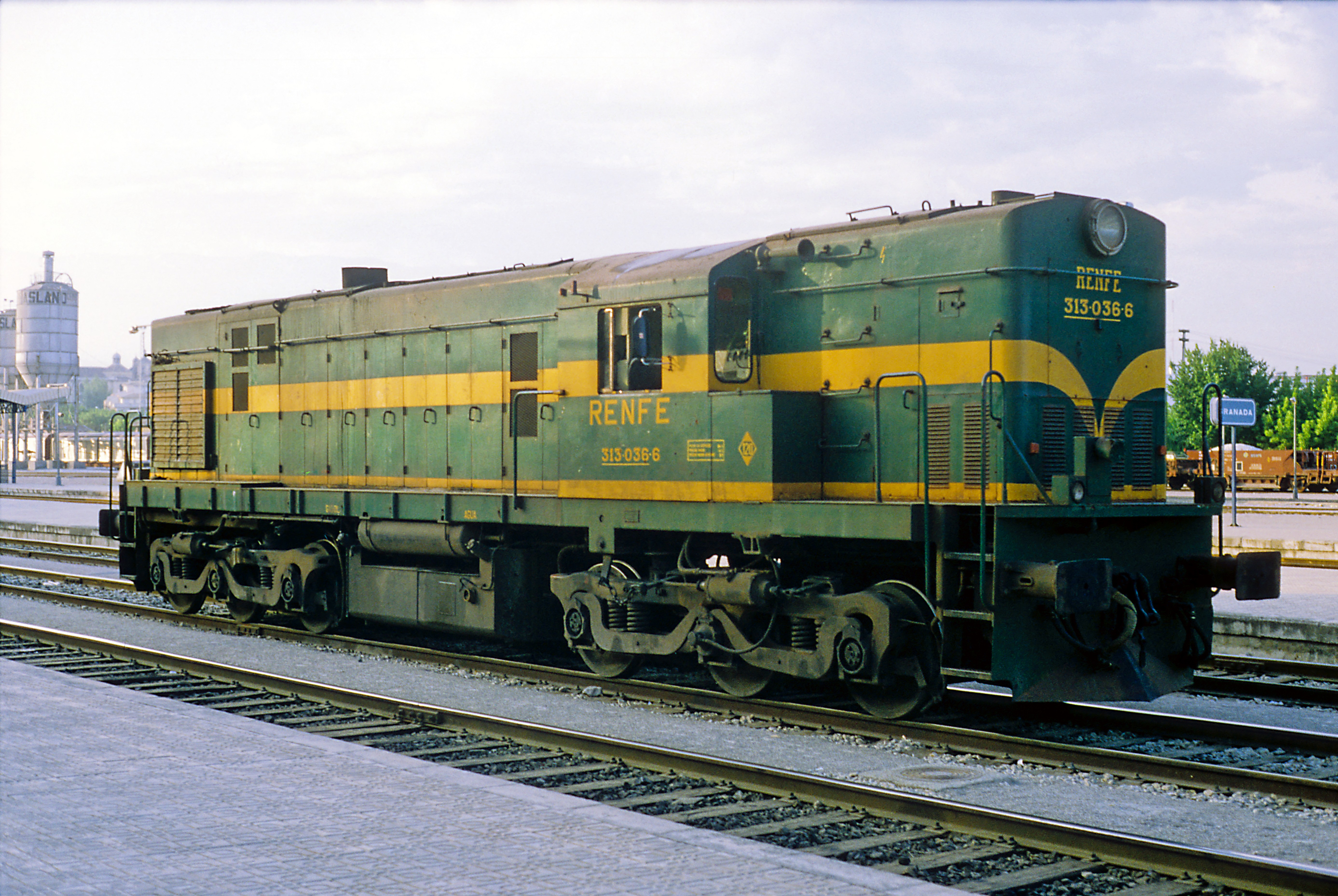
Type and origin
- Power type: Diesel-electric
- Builder: Alco / Euskalduna
- Model: ALCo DL535S (RSD39)
- Build date: 1965-7
- Total produced: 50
Specifications
- Configuration
  - UIC: (A1A)'(A1A)'
- Gauge: 1,668 mm (5 ft 5 21/32 in)
- Wheel diameter: 1,016 mm (40 in) new
- Length: 16.237 m (53 ft 3.3 in) over buffers
- Width: 2.775 m (9 ft 1.3 in)
- Height: 4.032 m (13 ft 2.7 in)
- Loco weight: 83.9 t (82.6 long tons; 92.5 short tons) operational
- Prime mover: Alco 251D
- Engine type: Four-stroke diesel
- Generator: DC generator (General Electric)
- Traction motors: DC traction motors (General Electric)
- Cylinders: 6
- Cylinder size: 228 mm × 267 mm (9.0 in × 10.5 in) bore x stroke
- Transmission: Electric
- MU working: yes
- Loco brake: Pneumatic and rheostatic
Performance figures
- Maximum speed: 120 km/h (75 mph)
- Power output: 1,370 hp (1,020 kW) @ 1100rpm
- Tractive effort: 193.25 kN (43,440 lb_{f})
Career
- Operators: Renfe
- Locale: Spain
- Sources =, except where noted

The Renfe 313 (originally Renfe 1300.) was a class of 6 axle mainline diesel-electric locomotives built for Renfe by Euskalduna under license from Alco. 50 units were built in the mid-1960s, locomotives surplus to Renfe's requirements were sold to Comboios de Portugal (CP), Trenes de Buenos Aires, Argentina, and to the railway company of Minero Siderúrgica de Ponferrada.

Alco's model number for the type was DL535S - RSD39

== History and description ==
The locomotives were acquired by Renfe to replace steam engines on lines in Andalusia, La Mancha and Extremadura, and were designed to be able to operate on lines that required a low axle load. The fifty units were numbered 313–001 to 313–050; 40 were constructed under license by Euskalduna, the remainder by Alco.

The locomotives were initially supplied in yellow striped Renfe green livery, some units later received Renfe yellow grey after refurbishment.

In 1989 Comboios de Portugal acquired 18 locomotives, Trenes de Buenos Aires (TBA) acquired 17 units in 1995. Additionally one unit (313-016) was acquired by FESAVA S.L. for work at the CEPSA refinery La Rábida in Palos de la Frontera, and four units (No.s 20, 41, 46 and 47) were acquired and regauged to 1,000 mm (3 ft 3 3/8 in) metre gauge for use by the railway of the Minero Siderúrgica de Ponferrada.

Other post-Renfe operators included rail infrastructure construction and maintenance company Guinovart & Oshsa (part of OHL Group) which acquired four units, including ex-CP locomotives, Ferrovial which acquired 313–011, and Grupo Azvi which acquired 313–005.

== See also ==
- CP class 1320, locomotives exported to Portugal
