= 313 Chaldaea =

Main-belt asteroid

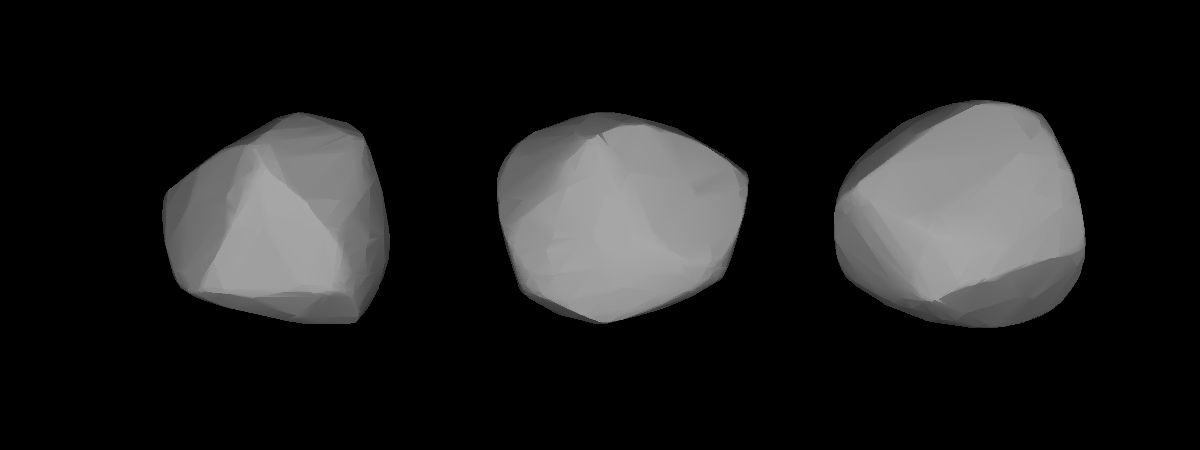
- Lightcurve-based 3D model of 313 Chaldaea

Discovery
- Discovered by: Johann Palisa
- Discovery date: 30 August 1891

Designations
- Pronunciation: /kælˈdiːə/
- Named after: Chaldea
- Minor planet category: Main belt

Orbital characteristics
- Epoch 31 July 2016 (JD 2457600.5)
- Uncertainty parameter 0
- Observation arc: 122.79 yr (44849 d)
- Aphelion: 2.8054 AU (419.68 Gm)
- Perihelion: 1.9456 AU (291.06 Gm)
- Semi-major axis: 2.3755 AU (355.37 Gm)
- Eccentricity: 0.18096
- Orbital period (sidereal): 3.66 yr (1337.3 d)
- Mean anomaly: 262.291°
- Mean motion: 0° 16^{m} 9.084^{s} / day
- Inclination: 11.654°
- Longitude of ascending node: 176.640°
- Argument of perihelion: 316.013°

Physical characteristics
- Dimensions: 96.34±1.7 km
- Mass: (1.30±0.34)×10^{18} kg (Note: Calculated from its standard gravitational parameter GM = 0.087±0.023 km^{3}/s^{2}.)
- Mean density: 6.90 g/cm^{3} (Note: Assuming a diameter of 71.2 km.)
- Synodic rotation period: 8.392 h (0.3497 d)
- Geometric albedo: 0.0524±0.002
- Spectral type: C
- Absolute magnitude (H): 8.90

313 Chaldaea is a large Main belt asteroid. It is classified as a C-type asteroid and is probably composed of carbonaceous material. It was discovered by Johann Palisa on 30 August 1891 in Vienna. It was named in honor of the Chaldeans, considered the founders of astrology.

In 2003, the asteroid was detected by radar from the Arecibo Observatory at a distance of 1.07 AU. The resulting data yielded an effective diameter of 96 ± 14 km.
