= 313 (song) =

2024 single by Residente, Sílvia Pérez Cruz and Penélope Cruz

Single by Residente, Sílvia Pérez Cruz and Penélope Cruz

from the album Las Letras Ya No Importan
- Language: Spanish
- Released: February 20, 2024
- Studio: Electric Lady Studios (New York City)
- Genre: Orchestral; pop ballad
- Length: 6:07
- Label: Sony Latin; 5020
- Songwriters: René Pérez Joglar; Sílvia Pérez Cruz; Leo Genovese
- Composer: Leo Genovese
- Producers: Residente; Genovese

Residente singles chronology
"Pólvora de Ayer" (2024)	"313" (2024)	"Que Fluya" (2024)

Music video
- "313" on YouTube

"313" is a song by Puerto Rican rapper Residente, Spanish singer Sílvia Pérez Cruz and actress Penélope Cruz. It was released on February 20, 2024, though Sony Music Latin and 8020 Records, as the seventh single from the former's second solo studio album, Las Letras Ya No Importan (2024). An orchestral ballad, the song is dedicated to one of Residente's closest friends, Valentina Gasparini, who committed suicide a year prior to the track's recording. The song and its title was also inspired by the number 313, which Residente kept encountering after Gasparini's death.

Its accompanying music video, which was released alongside the single, was filmed at the Royal Palace of La Granja de San Ildefonso in Segovia, Spain. Directed by Residente and produced by 1868 Studios, the video features all three performers and several dancers. At the 25th Annual Latin Grammy Awards, "313" received the award for Best Short Form Music Video and was also nominated for Song of the Year. It was also nominated for the Golden Frog for Best Music Video at the 32nd International Film Festival of the Art of Cinematography Camerimage, and Video of the Year at the 2024 MTV MIAW Awards.

== Background ==
Residente conceived "313" after a coincidental experience at a lobby of a hotel in Madrid in August 2025, where he listened to the voicemails of one of his closest friends and collaborators, Valentina Gasparini, who committed suicide from jumping off a cliff at the Mediterranean Sea a year prior. At the lobby of that same hotel he was in, a piano started playing and he decided to look over his WhatsApp messages with Gasparini, specifically her final voicemail to him, which was sent at 3:13 p.m. During an early-February 2026 interview with El País, he revealed that this scenario prompted him to write "313".

On February 18, 2024, Residente released a video teaser for "313", titled "Mensaje de Voz" (lit. transl. "Voice Message"), which sees him sending a voice message to Gasparini about how he kept encountering the number 313 in various situations after her death. "313", as well as its accompanying music video, was released on February 20, 2024, via Sony Music Latin and 5020 Records, as one of the supporting singles for Residente's second solo studio album, Las Letras Ya No Importan, which was released just two days later.

== Music and lyrics ==
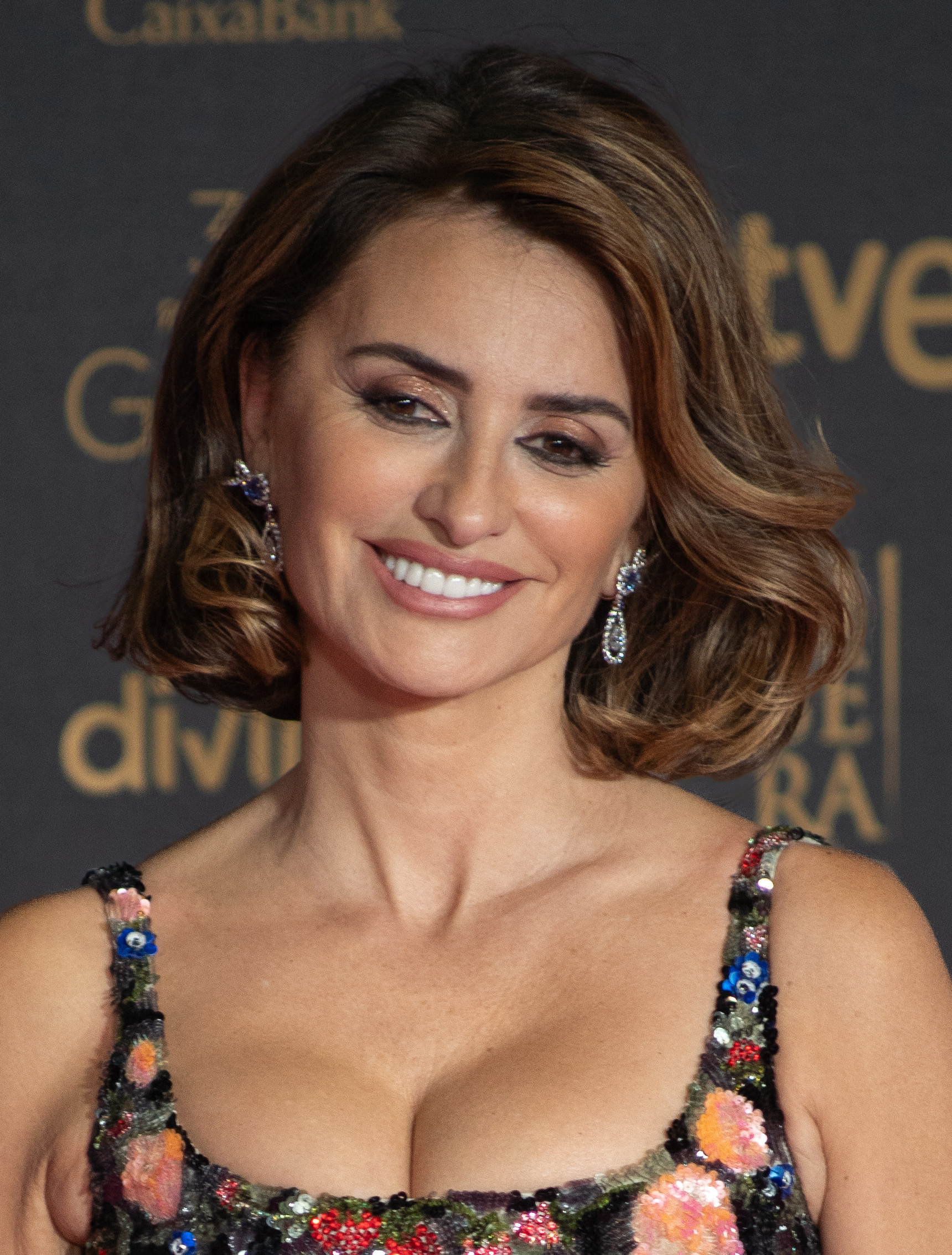
Credited as additional performers, Sílvia Pérez Cruz (left) co-wrote the track and provided additional vocals, while Penélope Cruz (right) provides a spoken word intro.

"313" is an orchestral track and a pop ballad. It was recorded at Electric Lady Studios in New York City. The song's title was initially going to be titled "8" at some point, due to other coincidences revolving the number, such as the song's eight opening notes and eight people being at the studio when the song was recorded. "313" serves as the second track from Las Letras Ya No Importan, preceded with the album's opening interlude track "Valentina", which is named after Gasparini; the track is a voicemail of her greeting Residente and apologizing for not being able to visit him. She also expresses her wish to Residente that he include French-language lyrics onto a song.

"313" begins with a female whispering in French, "Les paroles n'ont pas d'importance" (lit. transl. "The words do not matter"), fulfiling Gasparini's wish in "Valentina". It is then followed by a string arrangement—which was arranged by Leo Genovese and is borrowed from the parent album's title track—as well as a choir and spoken word poetry by Spanish actress Penélope Cruz. Cruz speaks about the passage of time and living the best moments in life. Rather than rapping, Residente sings about how he still feels that Gasparini is present around him. Valentina's sister, Noemi Gasparini, performs the violin throughout the song, while Spanish singer Sílvia Pérez Cruz provides additional flamenco-like vocals.

== Music video ==
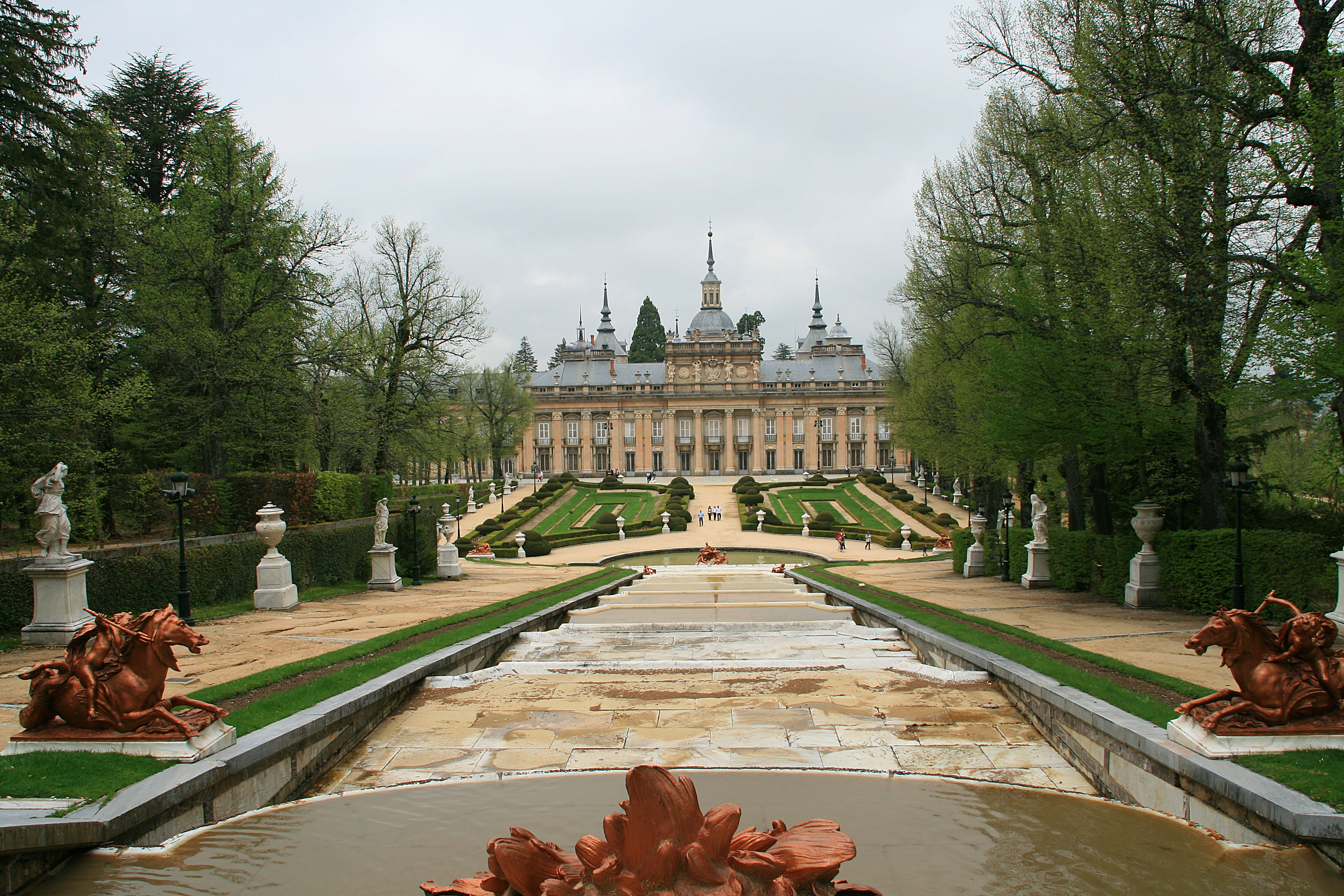
The Royal Palace of La Granja de San Ildefonso, where the video was filmed.

The official music video for "313" was directed by Residente and produced by 1868 Studios. It stars the song's three main performing artists. Filming took place at the Royal Palace of La Granja de San Ildefonso in Segovia, Spain, at autumnal temperatures which often dropped. Cruz had only one day to film her scenes. The video's ballet choreography was provided by Juliano Nunes and performed by Danza 180, who previously appeared on the music video for Calle 13's hit single "Atrévete-te-te", both of which Residente was the lead vocalist.

Taking place at a garden during a cloudy day, the video begins with several masked ballet dancers floating in the air, as they are frozen in time. Cruz additionally provides the song's beginning poetic narration. Residente is then revealed by more dancers who simultaneously transfer his voice to Cruz, who is eventually seen in a blue gown, singing in Residente's own voice while standing inside a tree at a forest. Cruz, who represents life, also controls Residente's and the dancers' (who represent time) movements, pushing the former from a distance into a palace, where dancers are also seen performing ballet movements. Pérez Cruz is eventually seen singing while standing on a pond. In the epilogue, Residente, who is now able to control his own movements, is seen running towards Cruz, only for both to start slowly vanishing into thin air.

The music video premiered on YouTube on February 20, 2026, garnering over one million views within 48 hours. On the same day, Residente posted a preview of the video on Instagram, with the caption reading his thanks to those who appeared or worked on the video. At the 25th Annual Latin Grammy Awards, the video won the award for Best Short Form Music Video and additionally received a nomination for Song of the Year. It was also nominated for the Golden Frog for Best Music Video at the 32nd International Film Festival of the Art of Cinematography Camerimage, and Video of the Year at the 2024 MTV MIAW Awards.

== Personnel ==
Credits adapted from Apple Music.

- Residente – vocals; songwriter, producer
- Sílvia Pérez Cruz – vocals; songwriter
- Penélope Cruz – spoken word
- Leo Genovese – piano; songwriter, arranger, producer
- Miriam Elhajli – choir
- Xenia Rubinos – choir
- Ana Carmela Ramírez – choir
- Kelly Guerra – choir
- Noemi Gasparini – violin
- Entcho Torodov – violin
- Leonor Falcón – viola
- Agustin Uriburu – cello
- Francesco Marcocci – contrabass
- Beatriz Artola – mixing, recording engineer
- Ted Jensen – mastering
