= American (word) =

Definitions for the word American

The meaning of the word American in the English language varies according to the historical, geographical, and political context in which it is used. American is derived from America, a term originally denoting all of the Americas (also called the Western Hemisphere or historically the "New World"), ultimately derived from the name of the Florentine explorer and cartographer Amerigo Vespucci (1451–1512). In some expressions, it retains this pan-American sense, but its usage has evolved over time and, for various historical reasons, the word came to denote people or things specifically from the United States of America. In contemporary English, American generally refers to the people of the United States of America and associated entities; among native English speakers, this usage is almost universal, with any other use of the term requiring specification. However, some have argued that "American" should be widened to also include people or things from anywhere in the Americas, which are also regarded by some as one continent.

The word can be used as either an adjective or a noun (viz. a demonym). In adjectival use, it means "of or relating to the United States"; for example, "Elvis Presley was an American singer" or "the man prefers American English". In its noun form, the word generally means a resident or citizen of the United States, but is also used for someone whose ethnic identity is simply "American". The noun is rarely used in English to refer to people not connected to the United States when intending a geographical meaning. When used with a grammatical qualifier, the adjective American can mean "of or relating to the Americas", as in Latin American or Indigenous American. Less frequently, the adjective can take this meaning without a qualifier, as in "American Spanish dialects and pronunciation differ by country" or the names of the Organization of American States and the American Registry for Internet Numbers (ARIN). A third use of the term pertains specifically to the Indigenous peoples of the Americas, for instance, "In the 16th century, many Americans died from imported diseases during the European conquest", though this usage is rare, as "indigenous", "First Nations" or "Amerindian" are considered less confusing and generally more appropriate.

Compound constructions which indicate a minority ethnic group, such as "African Americans" likewise refer exclusively to people in or from the United States, as does the prefix "Americo-". For instance, the Americo-Liberians and their language Merico derive their name from the fact that they are descended from African-American settlers, who were formerly enslaved in the United States.

== Other languages ==
French, German, Italian, Japanese, (Note: Japanese: "U.S. citizen" is amerika-jin (アメリカ人)) Hebrew, Arabic, and Russian (Note: Russian: "U.S. citizen" is amerikanec (американец) for males and amerikanka (американка) for females) speakers may use cognates of American to refer to inhabitants of the Americas or to U.S. nationals. They generally have other terms specific to U.S. nationals, such as the German US-Amerikaner, French étatsunien, Japanese beikokujin (米国人), and Italian statunitense. These specific terms may be less common than the term American.

In French, états-unien, étas-unien or étasunien, from États-Unis d'Amérique ("United States of America"), is a rarely used word that distinguishes U.S. things and persons from the adjective américain, which denotes persons and things from the United States, but may also refer to "the Americas".

Likewise, German's use of U.S.-amerikanisch and U.S.-Amerikaner observe this cultural distinction, solely denoting U.S. things and people. In normal parlance, the adjective "American" and its direct cognates are usually used if the context renders the nationality of the person clear. This differentiation is prevalent in German-speaking countries, as indicated by the style manual of the Neue Zürcher Zeitung (one of the leading German-language newspapers in Switzerland) which dismisses the term U.S.-amerikanisch as both 'unnecessary' and 'artificial' and recommends replacing it with amerikanisch. The respective guidelines of the foreign ministries of Austria, Germany and Switzerland all prescribe Amerikaner and amerikanisch in reference to the United States for official usage, making no mention of U.S.-Amerikaner or U.S.-amerikanisch.

In Spanish, americano denotes geographic and cultural origin in the Americas, as well as (infrequently) a U.S. citizen; (Note: The first two definitions in Diccionario de la lengua española (the official dictionary in Spanish) define americano as "Native of America" [Natural de América] and "Pertaining or relating to this part of the world" [Perteneciente o relativo a esta parte del mundo], where América refers to the continent. The fourth definition of americano is defined as "United States person" [estadounidense].) the more common term is estadounidense, sometimes spelled as estadunidense ("United States person"), which derives from Estados Unidos de América ("United States of America"). The Spanish term norteamericano ("North American") is frequently used to refer things and persons from the United States, but this term can also denote people and things from Canada and Mexico. Among Spanish-speakers, North America generally does not include Central America or the Caribbean.

Portuguese has americano, denoting both a person or thing from the Americas and a U.S. national. For referring specifically to a U.S. national and things, some words used are estadunidense (also spelled estado-unidense, "United States person"), from Estados Unidos da América, and ianque ("Yankee")—both usages exist in Brazil (although "americano" is more frequent), but are uncommon in Portugal—but the term most often used, and the only one in Portugal, is norte-americano, even though it could, as with its Spanish equivalent, apply to Canadians and Mexicans as well.

Conversely, in Czech, there is no possibility for disambiguation. Američan (m.) and američanka (f.) can refer to persons from the United States or from the continents of the Americas, and there is no specific word capable of distinguishing the two meanings. For this reason, the latter meaning is very rarely used, and word američan(ka) is used almost exclusively to refer to persons from the United States. The usage is exactly parallel to the English word.

In other languages, however, there is no possibility for confusion. For example, the Chinese word for "U.S. national" is měiguórén (simplified Chinese: 美国人; traditional Chinese: 美國人) (Note: Měiguórén is the Standard Mandarin pronunciation.) is derived from a word for the United States, měiguó, where měi is an abbreviation for Yàměilìjiā ("America") and guó is "country". The name for the American continents is měizhōu, from měi plus zhōu ("continent"). Thus, a měizhōurén is an American in the continent sense, and a měiguórén is an American in the U.S. sense. (Note: Chinese: měiguó ("United States") is written as 美国, měizhōu ("America the continent") is written as 美洲, guó ("country") is written as 国, and zhōu ("continent") is written as 洲.)

Korean and Vietnamese also use unambiguous terms, with Korean having Miguk (미국(인)) for the country versus Amerika (아메리카) for the continents, and Vietnamese having Hoa Kỳ for the country versus Châu Mỹ for the continents. Japanese has such terms as well (beikoku(jin) [米国(人) versus beishū(jin) [米洲人]), but they are found more in newspaper headlines than in speech, where amerikajin predominates.

In Swahili, Marekani means specifically the United States, and Mmarekani is a U.S. national, whereas the international form Amerika refers to the continents, and Mwamerika would be an inhabitant thereof. (Note: In Swahili, adding the prefix m(w)- to a word indicates a person (wa- would indicate people).) Likewise, the Esperanto word Ameriko refers to the continents. For the country there is the term Usono. Thus, a citizen of the United States is an usonano, whereas an amerikano is an inhabitant of the Americas.

== History ==
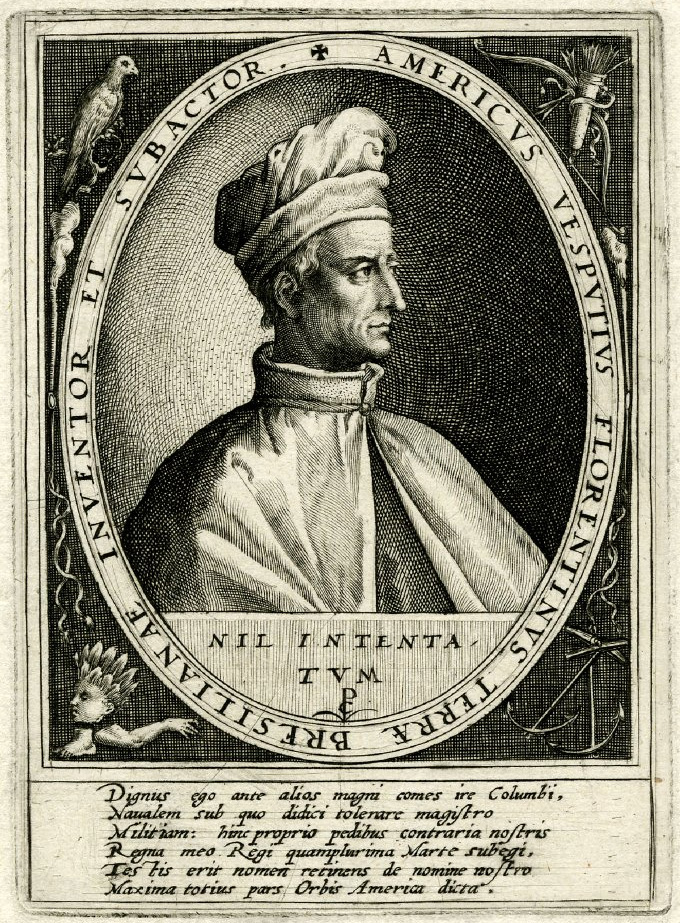
America is named after Italian explorer Amerigo Vespucci.

The name America was coined by Martin Waldseemüller from Americus Vesputius, the Latinized version of the name of Amerigo Vespucci (1454–1512), the Florentine explorer who mapped South America's east coast and the Caribbean Sea in the early 16th century. Later, Vespucci's published letters were the basis of Waldseemüller's 1507 map, which is the first usage of America. The adjective American subsequently denoted the New World.

In the 16th century, European usage of American denoted the native inhabitants of the New World. The earliest recorded use of this term in English is in Thomas Hacket's 1568 translation of André Thévet's book France Antarctique; Thévet himself had referred to the natives as Ameriques. In the following century, the term was extended to European settlers and their descendants in the Americas. The earliest recorded use of "English-American" dates to 1648, in Thomas Gage's The English-American his travail by sea and land: or, a new survey of the West India's.

In English, American was used especially for people in British America. Samuel Johnson, the leading English lexicographer, wrote in 1775, before the United States declared independence: "That the Americans are able to bear taxation is indubitable." The Declaration of Independence of July 1776 refers to "[the] unanimous Declaration of the thirteen united States of America" adopted by the "Representatives of the united States of America" on July 4, 1776. The official name of the country was reaffirmed on November 15, 1777, when the Second Continental Congress adopted the Articles of Confederation, the first of which says, "The Stile of this Confederacy shall be 'The United States of America'". The Articles further state:

In Witness whereof we have hereunto set our hands in Congress. Done at Philadelphia in the State of Pennsylvania the ninth day of July in the Year of our Lord One Thousand Seven Hundred and Seventy-Eight, and in the Third Year of the independence of America.

British map of the Americas in 1744

Thomas Jefferson, newly elected president in May 1801 wrote, "I am sure the measures I mean to pursue are such as would in their nature be approved by every American who can emerge from preconceived prejudices; as for those who cannot, we must take care of them as of the sick in our hospitals. The medicine of time and fact may cure some of them."

In The Federalist Papers (1787–88), Alexander Hamilton and James Madison used the adjective American with two different meanings: one political and one geographic; "the American republic" in Federalist No. 51 and in Federalist No. 70, and, in Federalist No. 24, Hamilton used American to denote the lands beyond the U.S.'s political borders.

Early official U.S. documents show inconsistent usage; the 1778 Treaty of Alliance with France used "the United States of North America" in the first sentence, then "the said united States" afterwards; "the United States of America" and "the United States of North America" derive from "the United Colonies of America" and "the United Colonies of North America". The Treaty of Peace and Amity of September 5, 1795, between the United States and the Barbary States contains the usages "the United States of North America", "citizens of the United States", and "American Citizens".

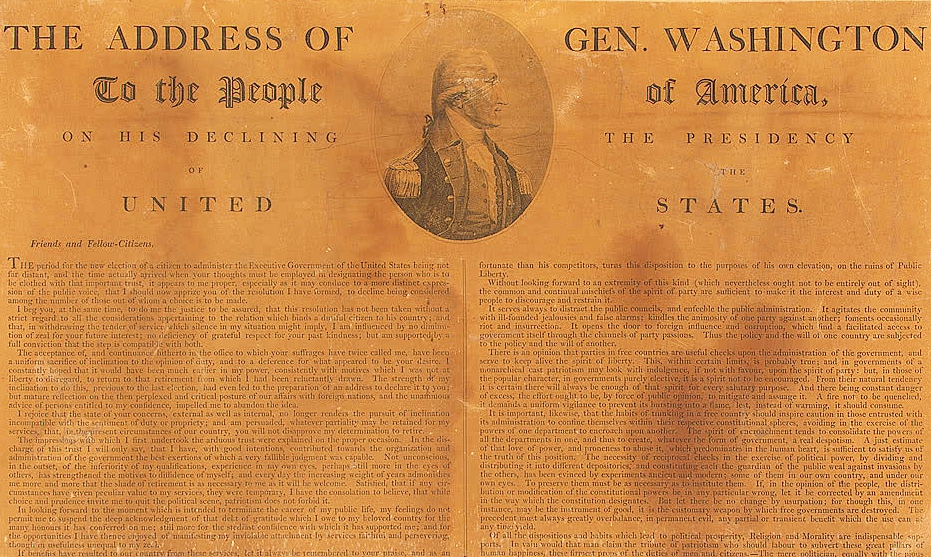
George Washington's Farewell Address (1796)

U.S. President George Washington, in his 1796 Farewell Address, declaimed that "The name of American, which belongs to you in your national capacity, must always exalt the just pride of patriotism more than any appellation." Political scientist Virginia L. Arbery notes that, in his Farewell Address:

"...Washington invites his fellow citizens to view themselves now as Americans who, out of their love for the truth of liberty, have replaced their maiden names (Virginians, South Carolinians, New Yorkers, etc.) with that of “American”. Get rid of, he urges, “any appellation derived from local discriminations.” By defining himself as an American rather than as a Virginian, Washington set the national standard for all citizens. "Over and over, Washington said that America must be something set apart. As he put it to Patrick Henry, 'In a word, I want an American character, that the powers of Europe may be convinced we act for ourselves and not for others.'"

As the historian Garry Wills has noted: "This was a theme dear to Washington. He wrote to Timothy Pickering that the nation 'must never forget that we are Americans; the remembrance of which will convince us we ought not to be French or English'." Washington's countrymen subsequently embraced his exhortation with notable enthusiasm.

This semantic divergence among North American anglophones, however, remained largely unknown in the Spanish-American colonies. In 1801, the document titled Letter to American Spaniards—published in French (1799), in Spanish (1801), and in English (1808)—might have influenced Venezuela's Act of Independence and its 1811 constitution.

The Latter-day Saints' Articles of Faith refer to the American continents as where they are to build Zion.

Common short forms and abbreviations are the United States, the U.S., the U.S.A., and America; colloquial versions include the U.S. of A. and the States. The term Columbia (from the Columbus surname) was a popular name for the U.S. and for the entire geographic Americas; its usage is present today in the District of Columbia's name. Moreover, the womanly personification of Columbia appears in some official documents, including editions of the U.S. dollar.

== Usage at the United Nations ==
Use of the term American for U.S. nationals is common at the United Nations, and financial markets in the United States are referred to as "American financial markets".

American Samoa, an unincorporated territory of the United States, is a recognized territorial name at the United Nations.

== Cultural views ==
=== Canada ===
Modern Canadians typically refer to people from the United States as Americans, though they seldom refer to the United States as America; in English they use the terms the United States, the U.S., or (informally) the States instead. Because of anti-American sentiment or simply national pride, Canadians never apply the term American to themselves. Not being an "American" is a part of Canadian identity, with many Canadians resenting being referred to as Americans or mistaken for U.S. citizens. This is often due to others' inability, particularly overseas, to distinguish English-speaking Canadians from Americans, by their accent or other cultural attributes. Some Canadians have protested the use of American as a national demonym.

=== Spain and Hispanic America ===
The use of American as a national demonym for U.S. nationals is challenged, primarily by Hispanic Americans. Spanish speakers in Spain and Hispanic America use the term estadounidense to refer to people and things from the United States (from Estados Unidos), while americano refers to the continents as a whole (from América). The term gringo is also accepted in many parts of Hispanic America to refer to a person or something from the United States; however, this term may be ambiguous in certain parts. Up to and including the 1992 edition, the Diccionario de la lengua española, published by the Real Academia Española, did not include the United States definition in the entry for americano; this was added in the 2001 edition. (Note: [Untranslated] Está muy generalizado, y resulta aceptable, el uso de norteamericano como sinónimo de estadounidense, ya que, aunque en rigor el término norteamericano podría usarse igualmente en alusión a los habitantes de cualquiera de los países de América del Norte o Norteamérica, se aplica corrientemente a los habitantes de los Estados Unidos. Pero debe evitarse el empleo de americano para referirse exclusivamente a los habitantes de los Estados Unidos, uso abusivo que se explica por el hecho de que los estadounidenses utilizan a menudo el nombre abreviado América (en inglés, sin tilde) para referirse a su país.) The Real Academia Española advised against using americanos exclusively for U.S. nationals:

[Translated] It is common, and thus acceptable, to use norteamericano as a synonym of estadounidense, even though strictly speaking, the term norteamericano can equally be used to refer to the inhabitants of any country in North America, it normally applies to the inhabitants of the United States. But americano should not be used to refer exclusively to the inhabitants of the United States, an abusive usage which can be explained by the fact that in the United States, they frequently abbreviate the name of the country to "America" (in English, with no accent).

=== Portugal and Brazil ===
Generally, americano denotes "U.S. citizen" in Portugal. The adjective currently used by the Portuguese press is norte-americano.

In Brazil, the term americano is used to address both that which pertains to the Americas and that which pertains to the U.S.; the particular meaning is deduced from context. Alternatively, the term norte-americano ("North American") is also used in more informal contexts, while estadunidense (of the U.S.) is the preferred form in academia. Use of the three terms is common in schools, government, and media. The term América is used exclusively for the whole continent, and the U.S. is called Estados Unidos ("United States") or Estados Unidos da América ("United States of America"), often abbreviated EUA.

== In other contexts ==
"American" in the 1994 Associated Press Stylebook was defined as, "An acceptable description for a resident of the United States. It also may be applied to any resident or citizen of nations in North or South America." Elsewhere, the AP Stylebook indicates that "United States" must "be spelled out when used as a noun. Use U.S. (no space) only as an adjective."

The entry for "America" in The New York Times Manual of Style and Usage from 1999 reads:

[the] terms "America", "American(s)" and "Americas" refer not only to the United States, but to all of North America and South America. They may be used in any of their senses, including references to just the United States, if the context is clear. The countries of the Western Hemisphere are collectively 'the Americas'.

Media releases from the Pope and Holy See frequently use "America" to refer to the United States, and "American" to denote something or someone from the United States.

=== International law ===
At least one international law uses U.S. citizen in defining a citizen of the United States rather than American citizen; for example, the English version of the North American Free Trade Agreement includes:

Only air carriers that are "citizens of the United States" may operate aircraft in domestic air service (cabotage) and may provide international scheduled and non-scheduled air service as U.S. air carriers...

Under the Federal Aviation Act of 1958, a "citizen of the United States" means:

(a) an individual who is a U.S. citizen;
(b) a partnership in which each member is a U.S. citizen; or
(c) a U.S. corporation of which the president and at least two-thirds of the board of directors and other managing officers are U.S. citizens, and at least 75 percent of the voting interest in the corporation is owned or controlled by U.S. citizens.

Many international treaties use the terms American and American citizen:

- 1796 – The treaty between the United States and the Dey of the Regency of Algiers on March 7, 1796, protected "American citizens".
- 1803 – The Louisiana Purchase Treaty between France and United States referred to "American citizens".
- 1825 – The treaty between the United States and the Cheyenne tribe refers to "American citizens".
- 1848 – The Treaty of Guadalupe Hidalgo between Mexico and the U.S. uses "American Government" to refer to the United States, and "American tribunals" to refer to U.S. courts.
- 1858 – The Treaty of Amity and Commerce between the United States and Japan protected "American citizens" and also used "American" in other contexts.
- 1898 – The Treaty of Paris ending the Spanish–American War, known in Spanish as the Guerra Hispano–Estadounidense ("Spain–United States War") uses "American" in reference to United States troops.
- 1966 – The United States–Thailand Treaty of Amity protects "Americans" and "American corporations".

=== U.S. commercial regulation ===
Products that are labeled, advertised, and marketed in the U.S. as "Made in the USA" must be, as set by the Federal Trade Commission (FTC), "all or virtually all made in the U.S." The FTC, to prevent deception of customers and unfair competition, considers an unqualified claim of "American Made" to expressly claim exclusive manufacture in the U.S: "The FTC Act gives the Commission the power to bring law enforcement actions against false or misleading claims that a product is of U.S. origin."

== Alternatives ==
There are a number of alternatives to the demonym American as a citizen of the United States that do not simultaneously mean any inhabitant of the Americas. One uncommon alternative is Usonian, which usually describes a certain style of residential architecture designed by Frank Lloyd Wright. Other alternatives have also surfaced, but most have fallen into disuse and obscurity. Merriam-Webster's Dictionary of English Usage says:

The list contains (in approximate historical order from 1789 to 1939) such terms as Columbian, Columbard, Fredonian, Frede, Unisian, United Statesian, Colonican, Appalacian, Usian, Washingtonian, Usonian, Uessian, U-S-ian, Uesican, United Stater.

Nevertheless, no alternative to American is common.

== See also ==
- Americas (terminology)
- Hyphenated Americans
- Names of the United States
- Naming of the Americas
- Totum pro parte

== Works cited ==
- Allen, Irving L. (1983). The Language of Ethnic Conflict: Social Organization and Lexical Culture. New York: Columbia University Press. Archived from the original on June 26, 2012 – via Questia.
- Condon, J.C. (1986). "...So near the United States". In Valdes, J.M. (ed.). Culture bound: Bridging the cultural gap in language teaching. Cambridge, UK: Cambridge University Press. pp. 85–93. ISBN 978-0-521-31045-1.
- Herbst, Philip H. (1997). Color of Words: An Encyclopaedic Dictionary of Ethnic Bias in the United States. Intercultural Press. ISBN 1-877864-42-0.
