= List of basketball shoe brands =

Basketball shoes are sneakers designed specifically for playing basketball. Special shoe designs for basketball have existed since the 1920s. This list includes major brands of basketball shoe, listed by manufacturer and year of introduction.

== Adidas ==
- Jabbar – worn by Kareem Abdul-Jabbar (1971)
- Campus (1970s)
- Top 10 (1979)
- Forum (1984)
- Ewing Rivalry 3 – worn by Patrick Ewing (1986)
- Real Deal II – worn by Antoine Walker (1986)
- Ewing Attitude – worn by Patrick Ewing (1987)
- Ewing Conductor – worn by Patrick Ewing (1987)
- Mutombo – worn by Dikembe Mutombo (1992)
- EQT Elevation – worn by Kobe Bryant (1996)
- EQT Top Ten – worn by Kobe Bryant (1996)
- K8B (Kobe Bryant signature shoe) (1997)
- Real Deal – worn by Antonie Walker (1997)
- KB82 – worn by Kobe Bryant (1998)
- Bromium – worn by Chris Webber (1999)
- KB8 III – worn by Kobe Bryant (1999)
- TMAC – worn by Tracy McGrady (2002)
- TMAC 2 – worn by Tracy McGrady (2003)
- TMAC III – worn by Tracy McGrady (2004)
- C-Billups – worn by Chauncey Billups (2006)
- Kevin Garnett III – worn by Kevin Garnett (2006)
- TMAC VI – worn by Tracy McGrady (2006)
- Skyhoot Plus Low – worn by Kareem Abdul-Jabbar (2007)
- adiZero Rose – worn by Derrick Rose (2009)
- TS Commander LIte "Skeleton" – worn by Tim Duncan (2009)
- adiZero Rose 1.5 – worn by Derrick Rose (2010)
- Superbeast – worn by Dwight Howard (2010)
- Dame line – worn by Damian Lillard (2014–present)
- Harden line – worn by James Harden (2016–present)
- D.O.N. line – worn by Donovan Mitchell (2018–present)
- Trae Young line – worn by Trae Young (2021–2024)
- AE line – worn by Anthony Edwards (2024–present)

== Athletic Propulsion Labs ==
- Load 'N Launch (2009)

== Anta ==
- GH – worn by Gordon Hayward (present)
- KT – worn by Klay Thompson (present)
- KAI - worn by Kyrie Irving (present)

== Converse ==
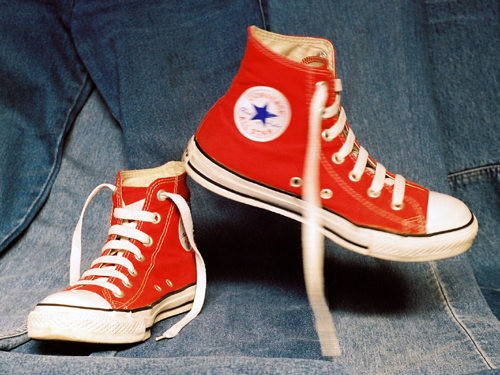
Converse Chuck Taylor All-Stars

- Chuck Taylor All-Stars (1918)
- Weapon (1986)
- Shai Gilgeous-Alexander (present)

== Ektio ==
- Wraptor (2010)
- Post Up (2010)

== Jordan ==
- Melo line – worn by Carmelo Anthony (2003–2017)
- CP3 line – worn by Chris Paul (2008–2019)
- Fly Wade line – worn by Dwyane Wade (2009–2012)
- Why Not line – worn by Russell Westbrook (2013–present)
- Zion line – worn by Zion Williamson (2021–present)
- Luka line – worn by Luka Dončić (2022–present)
- Tatum line – worn by Jayson Tatum (2023–present)

== Li-Ning ==
- Way of Wade – worn by Dwyane Wade from 2012 until his 2018 retirement, and remains in production today
- JB line – worn by Jimmy Butler (2021–present)
- CJ line – worn by CJ McCollum (2021–present)

== New Balance ==
- KAWHI line worn by Kawhi Leonard (2020–present)

== Nike ==
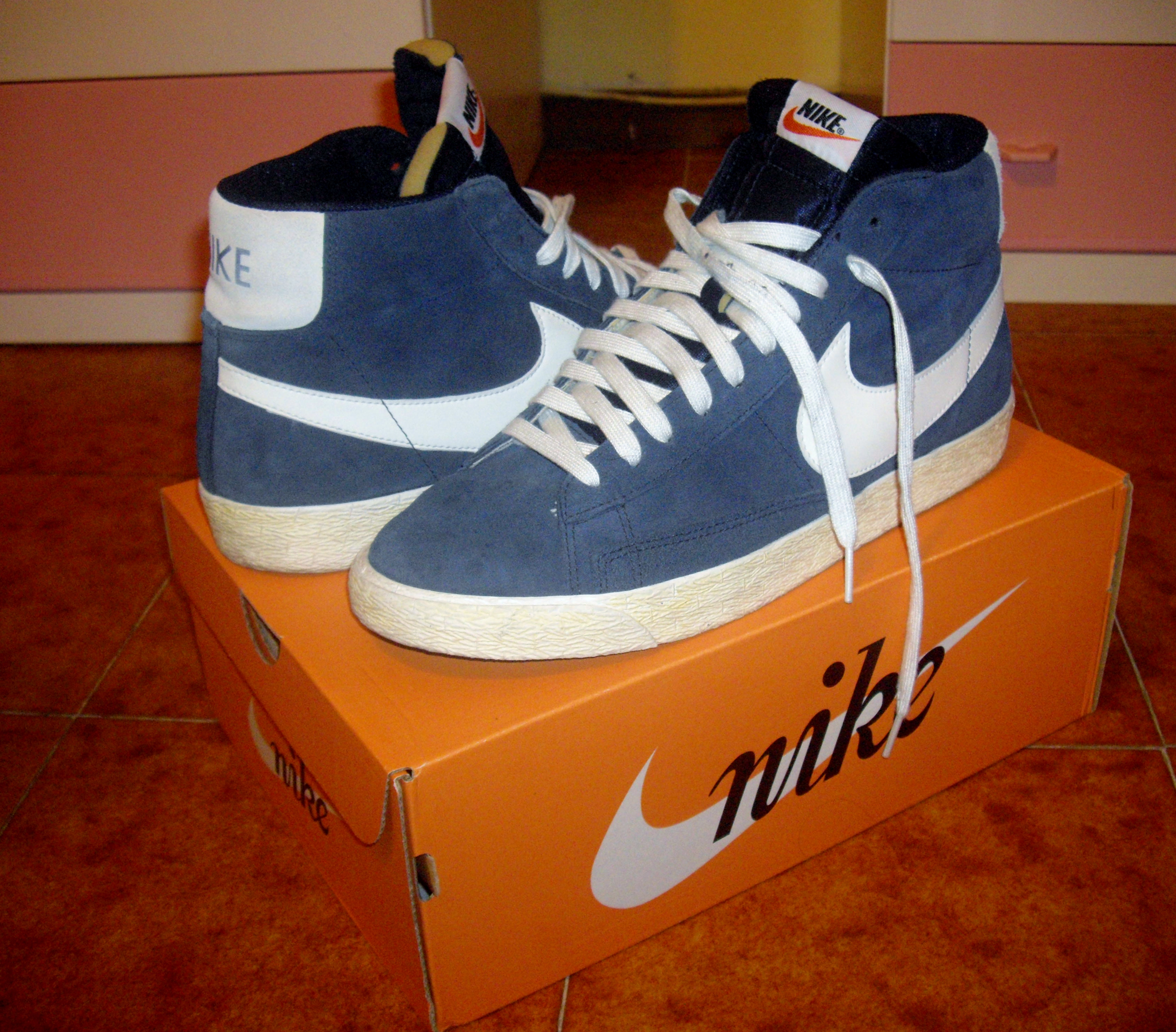
2012 Nike Blazers

Nike Kobe IV POP Finals MVP, 2009

- Blazer (1973)
- Air Force (1982)
- Air Ship (1984)
- Vandal (1984)
- Dunk (1985)
- Terminator (1985)
- Air Jordan (1985)
- Air Max (1987)
- LeBron signature line – worn by LeBron James (2003–present)
- Kobe signature line – worn by Kobe Bryant (2005–2016, still in production today)
- KD signature line – worn by Kevin Durant (2008–present)
- Hyper series (2008)
- Kyrie signature line – worn by Kyrie Irving (2014–2022)
- PG signature line – worn by Paul George (2017–2022)
- Zoom Freak signature line – worn by Giannis Antetokounmpo (2019–present)
- GT series (2021-present)
- Ja signature line – worn by Ja Morant (2022–present)
- Sabrina signature line – worn by Sabrina Ionescu (2023–present)
- Book signature line – worn by Devin Booker (2024–present)
- A'ja signature line – worn by A'ja Wilson (2025–present)

== Pro-Keds ==
- Royal (1949)
- Shotmaker (1980)

== Puma ==
- Clyde – designed for Walt Frazier (1973)
- Puma All-Pro Nitro – worn by R.J. Barrett (2018–present) and Tyrese Haliburton (2024-present)
- MB line – worn by LaMelo Ball (2021–present)
- Stewie line – worn by Breanna Stewart (2022–present)
- Scoot line – worn by Scoot Henderson (2023–present)

== Reebok ==
- BB4600 (1986)
- Pump (1989)
- Shaq Attaq – worn by Shaquille O'Neal (1992)
- The Answer – worn by Allen Iverson (1997)
- Angel Reese 1 – worn by Angel Reese (2025– present)

== Starbury ==
- Big Ben – Worn by Ben Wallace (2007)
- Stephon Marbury signature line (2006–2009)

== Under Armour ==
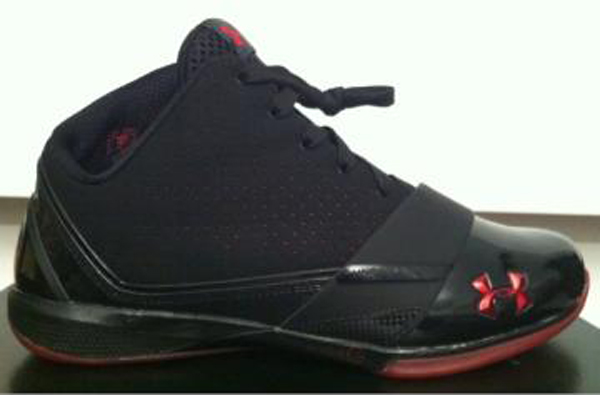
Under Armour Black Ice

- Micro G (2010)
- Curry line – worn by Stephen Curry (2015–2020)
- Curry Brand – worn by Stephen Curry (2020–2026)
- Embiid line – worn by Joel Embiid (2020)
- Fox line - worn by De'Aaron Fox (2024-present)

== Xtep ==
- JLIN ONE (2020)
