= Bad Bunny =

Puerto Rican rapper (born 1994)

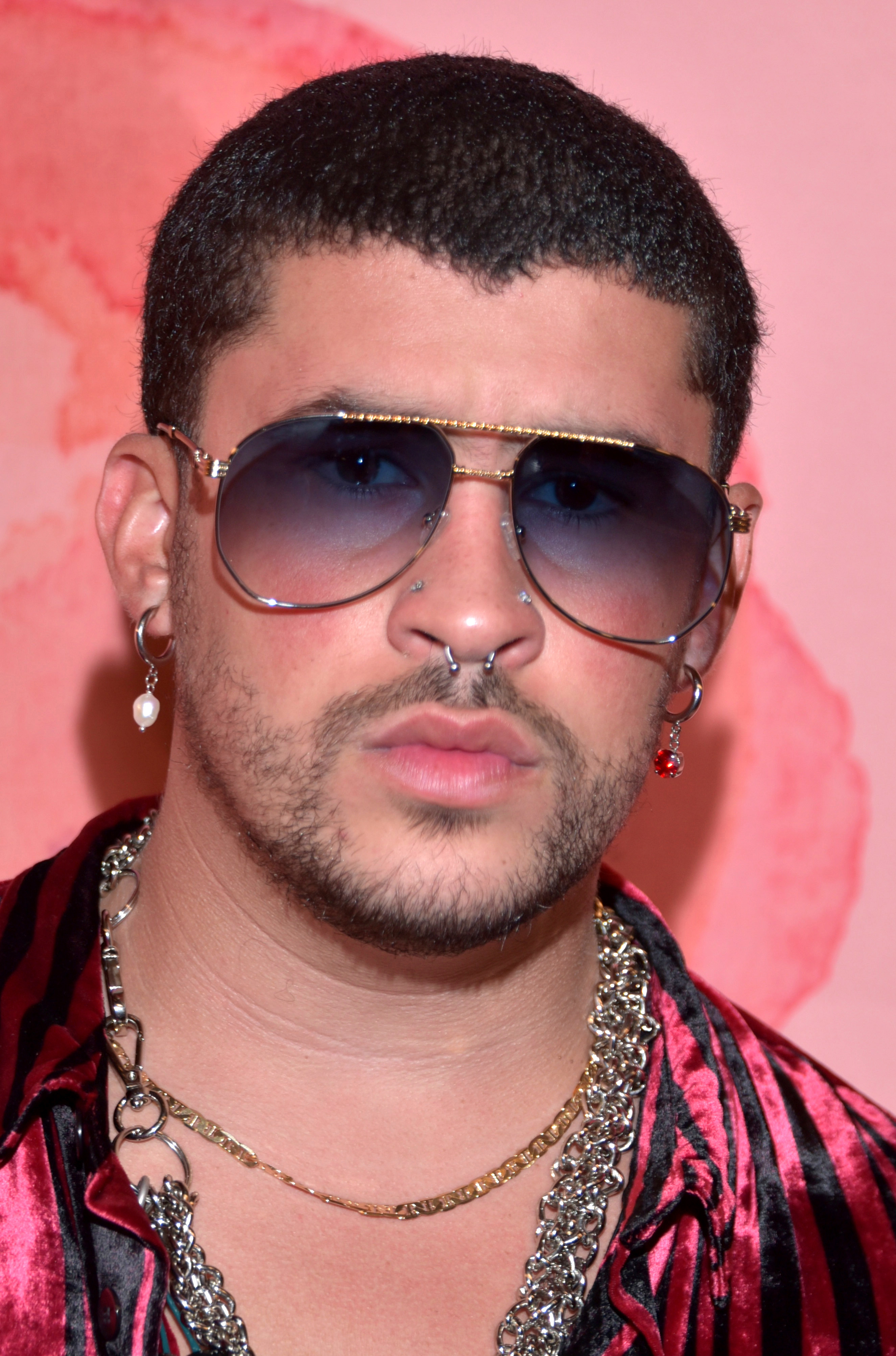
- Bad Bunny in 2019
- Born: Benito Antonio Martínez Ocasio; March 10, 1994 (age 32); Bayamón, Puerto Rico
- Occupations: Rapper; singer; songwriter; record producer; actor; professional wrestler
- Years active: 2013–present
- Works: Discography
- Awards: Full list
- Musical career
- Origin: Vega Baja, Puerto Rico
- Genres: Latin hip-hop; Latin trap; reggaeton; Latin pop
- Instrument: Vocals
- Labels: Hear This Music; Rimas
- Website: debitirarmasfotos.com

Signature
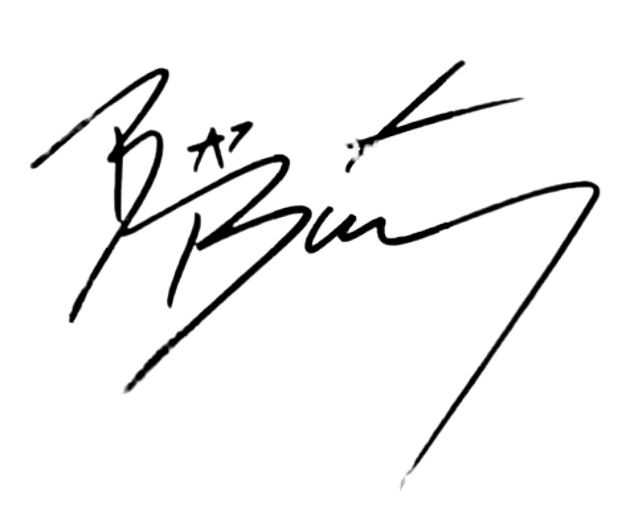

Benito Antonio Martínez Ocasio (Latin American Spanish: [beˈnito anˈtonjo maɾˈtines oˈkasjo]; born March 10, 1994), known professionally as Bad Bunny, is a Puerto Rican rapper, singer, and record producer. Dubbed the "King of Latin Trap", he is widely credited with helping Spanish-language rap reach mainstream global popularity and is considered one of the greatest Latino rappers of all time. Music critics have also noted Bad Bunny's role in broadening the international appeal of Latin urban music by incorporating elements of salsa, rock, and other Latin genres into his recordings.

Bad Bunny rose to prominence in 2016 with his song "Diles", which led to a recording contract with Hear This Music. He gained global recognition with the US Billboard Hot 100 number-one single "I Like It". Bad Bunny's debut studio album, X 100pre (2018), was ranked among the Rolling Stone's 500 Greatest Albums of All Time. His second solo album, YHLQMDLG (2020), became Spotify's most-streamed album of the year worldwide. El Último Tour Del Mundo (2020), Bad Bunny's third solo album, became the first all-Spanish language album to top the US Billboard 200. His fourth solo album, Un Verano Sin Ti (2022), was the year's most successful album globally according to the International Federation of the Phonographic Industry (IFPI). He followed it with the Billboard 200 number-one albums Nadie Sabe Lo Que Va a Pasar Mañana (2023) and Debí Tirar Más Fotos (2025); the latter became the first Spanish-language album to win the Grammy Award for Album of the Year. Bad Bunny scored five Billboard Global 200 number-one singles—"Dakiti", "Un x100to", "Where She Goes", "Mónaco", and "DTMF".

Bad Bunny was the Top Touring Artist of the Year in 2022 and the most-streamed artist of the year on Spotify four times between 2020 and 2025. Billboard crowned him the Greatest Pop Star of 2022 and 2025. In 2019, he was selected for the Forbes 30 under 30 list as an honoree in the Music category. His 2026 Super Bowl LX halftime show won a record seven Primetime Emmy Awards. Bad Bunny's accolades include six Grammy Awards, a Primetime Emmy Award, seventeen Latin Grammy Awards, eight Billboard Music Awards, and thirteen Lo Nuestro Awards.

Outside of music, Bad Bunny occasionally performs in professional wrestling. He began making appearances on WWE programming in 2021 and made his in-ring debut at WrestleMania 37. He is a one-time WWE 24/7 Champion and has wrestled at the 2022 Royal Rumble and the 2023 Backlash pay-per-view events. Bad Bunny has also appeared in multiple films, including Bullet Train (2022), Cassandro (2023), Caught Stealing (2025), Happy Gilmore 2 (2025) and Toy Story 5 (2026).

== Early life ==
Benito Antonio Martínez Ocasio was born on March 10, 1994, in Bayamón, and was raised in the Almirante Sur barrio of Vega Baja, Puerto Rico. His father, Benito "Tito" Martínez, was a truck driver, and his mother, Lysaurie Ocasio Declet, is a retired schoolteacher. He has two younger brothers, Bernie and Bysael. His parents often listened to genres such as salsa, merengue, and pop ballads.

Martínez's earliest musical memory was when he received the record Aquel Que Había Muerto by Puerto Rican rapper and reggaetón pioneer Vico C as a Christmas gift at the age of five. His initial musical purchases included CDs of Marc Anthony and Víctor Manuelle. He said, "I wasn't the kid who got involved in the streets. I liked to be at home with my family." He attended church weekly with his devoutly Catholic mother and sang in the church choir until age 13. Bad Bunny has stated that his early experiences singing in church helped shape his musical foundation and stage confidence. After leaving the choir, he developed an interest in the artists he heard on the radio, particularly Daddy Yankee and Héctor Lavoe. His stage name originated from a time when he was forced to wear a bunny costume and was annoyed about it. He later thought the name "Bad Bunny" would "market well".

After graduating high school in 2012, Martínez enrolled in the audiovisual communications program at the University of Puerto Rico at Arecibo, aiming to become a radio host. He worked part-time as a bagger and cashier at an Econo supermarket while creating music. He left university without completing his degree to pursue his musical aspirations. Speaking about the Puerto Rican music industry, he stated, "I'm from Vega Baja, a small area that's not a metropolis like San Juan where the majority of the genre's artists have come from."

== Music career ==
=== 2013–2019: Beginnings, X 100pre, and Oasis ===
He started to write and create his own music at the age of 14. In 2016, his song "Diles" caught the attention of DJ Luian from SoundCloud who signed him to his record label, Hear this Music. His single "Soy Peor", released in December 2016, reached number 19 on the Billboard Hot Latin Songs chart. In May 2017, his collaboration with Colombian singer Karol G, "Ahora Me Llama", was released, reaching number 10 on the Billboard Hot Latin Songs chart. It was listed on "Alt.Latino's Favorites: The Songs of 2017" as one of the best Latin songs of 2017. In July 2017, Bad Bunny signed a booking deal with Cardenas Marketing Network (CMN) for several Latin American countries.

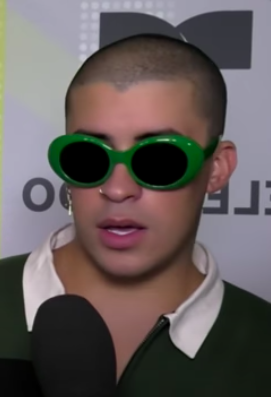
Bad Bunny in 2017

Starting in November 2017, Bad Bunny hosted Beats 1's first Spanish-language show, Trap Kingz. The remix of "Te Boté" with Ozuna and Nicky Jam reached number one on the Hot Latin Songs chart. In May 2018, American rapper Cardi B released a collaboration with Bad Bunny and J Balvin, "I Like It", which topped the Billboard Hot 100. On October 11, 2018, Bad Bunny released "Mia" with Drake, which reached number five on the Billboard Hot 100.

Bad Bunny released his debut album X 100pre on December 24, 2018, on the Rimas Entertainment label. The album peaked at number 11 on the US Billboard 200. On Metacritic, X 100pre received an average score of 84 based on five reviews, and it was voted 447th in Rolling Stone's 2020 500 Greatest Albums of All Time list. Alexis Petridis of The Guardian praised Bad Bunny's "off-kilter creativity". In 2019, he was selected for the Forbes 30 under 30 list as an honoree in the Music category.

On June 28, 2019, Bad Bunny released Oasis, an eight-song collaborative album with J Balvin. It peaked at number nine on the Billboard 200 and topped the Billboard US Latin Albums chart. In July 2019, he joined protests against Puerto Rican governor Ricardo Rosselló in response to Telegramgate. Bad Bunny and Residente released "Afilando Los Cuchillos" ("Sharpening the knives") during the demonstrations. In October, Bad Bunny headlined the 2nd Pornhub Awards in Los Angeles. His performance also featured Rico Nasty And Kali Uchis.

=== 2020–2021: YHLQMDLG, Las que no iban a salir, and El Último Tour Del Mundo ===
In February 2020, Bad Bunny was a guest performer at the Super Bowl LIV halftime show, headlined by Shakira and Jennifer Lopez. Bad Bunny announced the album YHLQMDLG on February 27, 2020, during an appearance on The Tonight Show Starring Jimmy Fallon and stated that it would be released on the 2020 leap day, namely February 29. The album's title is an acronym for "Yo Hago Lo Que Me Da La Gana" (Spanish for "I Do What I Want") and features collaborations with Daddy Yankee, Yaviah, Jowell & Randy, Ñengo Flow, among other artists.

YHLQMDLG debuted at number two on the US Billboard 200, becoming the highest-charting all-Spanish album ever on the chart at the time. The album was met with critical acclaim, with the album's musical diversity being praised. "Vete" was released as the lead single of the album on November 22, 2019. The second single, "Ignorantes", with Panamanian singer Sech came out on February 14, 2020. In March 2020, Bad Bunny released the music video for "Yo Perreo Sola", in which the artist performs in drag. "Yo Perreo Sola" landed number one on the Billboard Latin Airplay chart, earning Bad Bunny his ninth number 1 on the chart in just over two years.

On April 4, 2020, he released the song "En Casita" on SoundCloud, which expressed solidarity towards others in quarantine due to COVID-19 and featured vocals from his girlfriend, Gabriela Berlingeri. On May 10, 2020, Bad Bunny released his first compilation Las que no iban a salir, without previous announcements. The compilation's title translates to "The Ones That Were Not Going to Come Out" and includes unreleased or unfinished material songs. The album features collaborations with Don Omar, Yandel, Zion & Lennox, Nicky Jam, and Jhayco. Discussing the album's surprise release, Bad Bunny explained, "There was no real meaning behind it. I just thought, 'Damn. What people need is entertainment'." Bad Bunny had been filming his supporting role in Narcos: Mexico before filming was postponed due to the pandemic. It premiered in November 2021.

In July 2020, he appeared on the first digital cover of Playboy magazine as the first man to appear on the cover solo other than the magazine's founder, Hugh Hefner. The cover was shot by photographer Stillz in Miami, Florida, and the magazine includes a feature article entitled "Bad Bunny Is Not Playing God." He also received the ASCAP Latin award for Songwriter of the Year. In August, his song "Pero Ya No" appeared in an advertisement for politician Joe Biden's 2020 United States presidential election campaign.

On September 20, 2020, Bad Bunny performed a surprise, live (via his YouTube channel and Uforia), free concert from atop a flatbed truck that looked like a subway car going through the streets of New York and ended at Harlem Hospital Center. In October 2020, Bad Bunny released the single "Dakiti", with Jhayco, which topped the Billboard Global 200 and reached number five on the US Hot 100. The song is included on his third studio album, El Último Tour Del Mundo, which was released on November 27, 2020, and was described as a personal and ambitious record. It became the first all-Spanish language album to reach number one on the Billboard 200.

Bad Bunny and YHLQMDLG became Spotify's most-streamed artist and album globally in 2020, respectively. It marked the first time a non-English language music artist topped the year-end list, with The Guardian considering him "the world's biggest pop star" for his streaming numbers. The album received the Grammy Award for Best Latin Pop or Urban Album at the 63rd Annual Grammy Awards. On February 20, 2021, Bad Bunny performed "La Noche de Anoche" with Rosalía and "Te Deseo Lo Mejor" on Saturday Night Live, hosted by Regé-Jean Page, as well as appearing in the pre-recorded musical sketches "Loco" and "Sea Shanty". On the US Billboard Hot 100, Bad Bunny's next single "Yonaguni" became his fourth top 10 entry and first with no accompanying acts. He was also cast in David Leitch-directed film Bullet Train, starring Brad Pitt.

In July 2021, it was announced that Bad Bunny co-wrote and co-produced the fifth album of Puerto Rican Latin pop artist Tommy Torres titled El Playlist de Anoche. Bad Bunny won the most awards at the 2021 Billboard Latin Music Awards with 10, including the category Artist of the Year. In the following months, he was featured on Aventura's single "Volví", and released "Lo Siento BB:/" with Tainy and Julieta Venegas. In September 2021, he appeared on the Time 100, Time's annual list of the 100 most influential people in the world. Bad Bunny's 2022 concert tour, El Último Tour del Mundo, visited the US and Canada indoor arenas. He won Best Urban Music Album and Best Rap/Hip Hop Song at the 22nd Annual Latin Grammy Awards. El Último Tour Del Mundo won Best Música Urbana Album at the 64th Annual Grammy Awards. In December 2021, it was announced that Bad Bunny became Spotify's most-streamed artist of the year globally, for a second year in a row.

On December 24, 2021, a short film and music video titled Te Deseo Lo Mejor was released in collaboration with the creators of The Simpsons. The film was directed by David Silverman and stars Humberto Vélez, Claudia Motta and Bad Bunny.

=== 2022–2023: Un Verano Sin Ti and Nadie Sabe Lo Que Va a Pasar Mañana ===
In January 2022, Bad Bunny was featured in Vogue for the second time, modeling the current season's best bags. In April 2022, Sony Pictures announced Bad Bunny as the lead for El Muerto, a film set in Sony's Spider-Man Universe. The film was originally set to be released on January 12, 2024, prior to being removed from the release schedule. On May 6, 2022, Bad Bunny released his fourth (fifth overall) studio album, Un Verano Sin Ti, which debuted at number one on the Billboard 200 and stood there for thirteen non-consecutive weeks. The album was declared the best-performing album of the year on the Billboard 200 year-end chart, as well as the world's best-performing album of 2022 according to IFPI, making Bad Bunny the first Latino to have won a IFPI Global Chart Award. It also broke the record for the most-streamed album of all time on Spotify. Un Verano Sin Ti became the first Spanish-language album to be nominated for the Grammy Award for Album of the Year.

Bad Bunny began his fourth concert tour World's Hottest Tour on August 5, 2022, set to visit fourteen countries of the American continent. On October 4, 2022, the tour became the highest-grossing tour by a Latin artist in history, earning US$232.5 million at the time. Bad Bunny received the most nominations (eight) for the 2022 American Music Awards, including his first for artist of the year. He was crowned Artist of the Year by Billboard in 2022. He also became the most streamed artist of the year in 2022 for the third year in a row.

On May 19, 2023, Bad Bunny released his first solo single of the year titled "Where She Goes", in which he ventured into jersey club music. The music video had cameos from Frank Ocean, Lil Uzi Vert, Ronaldinho, and others. In an interview with Vanity Fair on September 12, 2023, Bad Bunny revealed that he is no longer involved in the upcoming El Muerto film after its schedule removal. He also confirmed that he was working on a new album, planned for release sometime during the following fall. Bad Bunny hinted at the possibility of the upcoming project's sound, confirming that he is "playing around and enjoying myself, letting go. I'm being inspired a lot by the music of the '70s, —across genres, in both Spanish and English, but I'm not sure if this is going to shape my music, generally or just one song," After weeks of unconfirmed teasers and rumors, Bad Bunny revealed the album's title as Nadie Sabe Lo Que Va a Pasar Mañana; the album has 22 tracks and was released on October 13, 2023.

=== 2024–present: Debí Tirar Más Fotos and Super Bowl LX halftime show ===
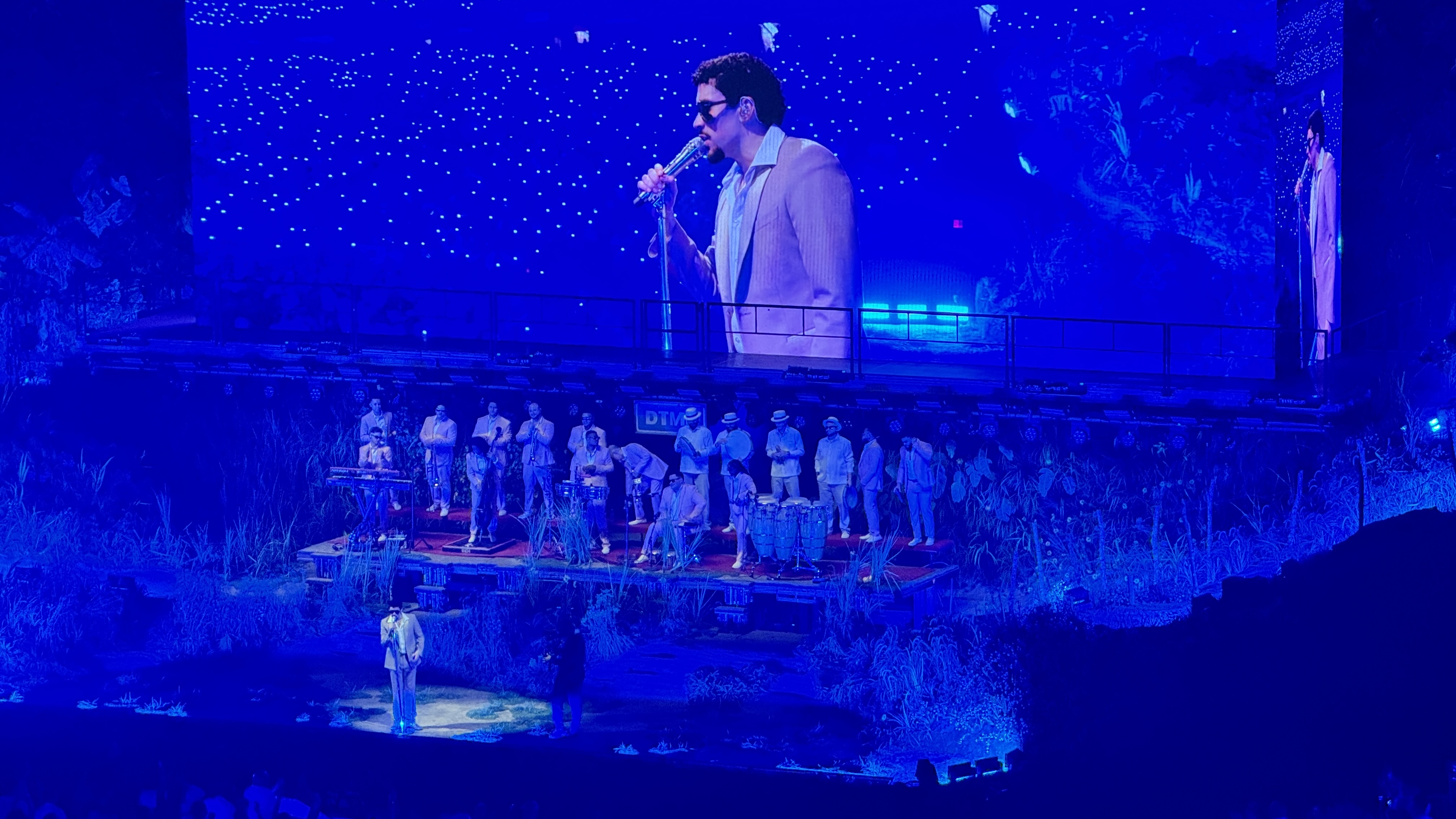
Bad Bunny performing Baile Inolvidable at the "No me quiero ir de aquí" Residency in Puerto Rico

On December 5, 2024, Bad Bunny released the lead single "El Clúb", followed by the second single "Pitorro de Coco" and the announcement of his new album Debí Tirar Más Fotos on December 26, 2024. On January 5, 2025, he released his seventh album, Debí Tirar Más Fotos, stating that it "recommits me to Puerto Rico"; it contains many collaborators representing a range of Puerto Rican styles. After the release of Debí Tirar Más Fotos, Bad Bunny announced No Me Quiero Ir de Aquí, a 30-date residency which took place at San Juan's José Miguel Agrelot Coliseum (also referred as "El Choli"), during July 2025–September 2025 with the first nine dates exclusively for Puerto Rico residents.

The residency occurred during hurricane season in the Atlantic Ocean—a period when tourism drops by 25% to 45%, and lodging prices fall by as much as 50%, according to tourism agency Discover Puerto Rico. According to a September 1 Moody's Analytics estimate, the residency was expected to draw around 600,000 attendees and have a direct economic impact of $250 million. Moody also estimated that total spending, including purchases not directly related to shows, would reach $400 million, prompting the firm to raise its 2025 economic forecast from 0.3% growth to 0.4%.

On April 7, 2025, NPR Music released Bad Bunny's Tiny Desk Concert performance. On May 5, 2025, Bad Bunny announced Debí Tirar Más Fotos World Tour, a 23-date stadium world tour, with dates in Europe, Australia, Japan, and Latin America beginning in November 2025. Bad Bunny cited concerns that the United States Immigration and Customs Enforcement (ICE) could harm fans at his concerts as additional reasoning for not doing a 2025 US tour (though he said this was not out of spite toward the United States).

There were many reasons why I didn't show up in the U.S., and none of them were out of hate—I've performed there many times. All of (the shows) have been successful. All of them have been magnificent. I've enjoyed connecting with Latinos who have been living in the U.S. But specifically, for a residency here in Puerto Rico, when we are an unincorporated territory of the United States. People from the U.S. could come here to see the show. Latinos and Puerto Ricans of the United States could also travel here, or to any part of the world. But there was the issue of—like, fucking ICE could be outside [my concert]. And it's something that we were talking about and very concerned about.

On July 14, Bad Bunny released the single "Alambre Púa", with the track's title stylized in the same manner as songs from Debí Tirar Más Fotos.

On September 28, 2025, it was announced that he would headline the Super Bowl LX halftime show on February 8, 2026, making him the first solo Latino artist to do so. In a statement released by the NFL on September 28, he said, "It's for those who came before me and ran countless yards so I could come in and score a touchdown … this is for my people, my culture, and our history." The decision to have Bad Bunny headline the performance spurred controversy, with U.S. president Donald Trump calling the choice "absolutely ridiculous", with others, including show producer Jay-Z and NFL commissioner Roger Goodell supporting the choice. Bad Bunny's halftime show was the first to be performed in majority Spanish. His halftime performance ranked as the fourth most-watched Super Bowl halftime show with an average of 128.2 million viewers. For his work, Bad Bunny won the Primetime Emmy Award for Outstanding Variety Special (Live).

In June 2026, while in Madrid for the tour, Bad Bunny and his family had a private audience with Pope Leo XIV at the Santiago Bernabéu stadium following a papal event attended by 80,000 people. Bad Bunny had requested the meeting.

== Artistry ==
=== Influences ===
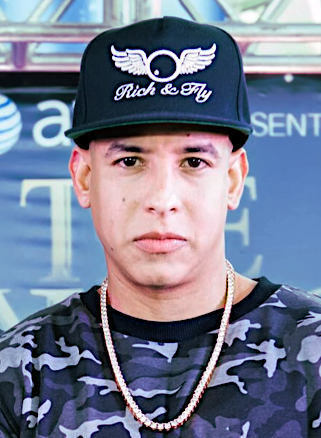
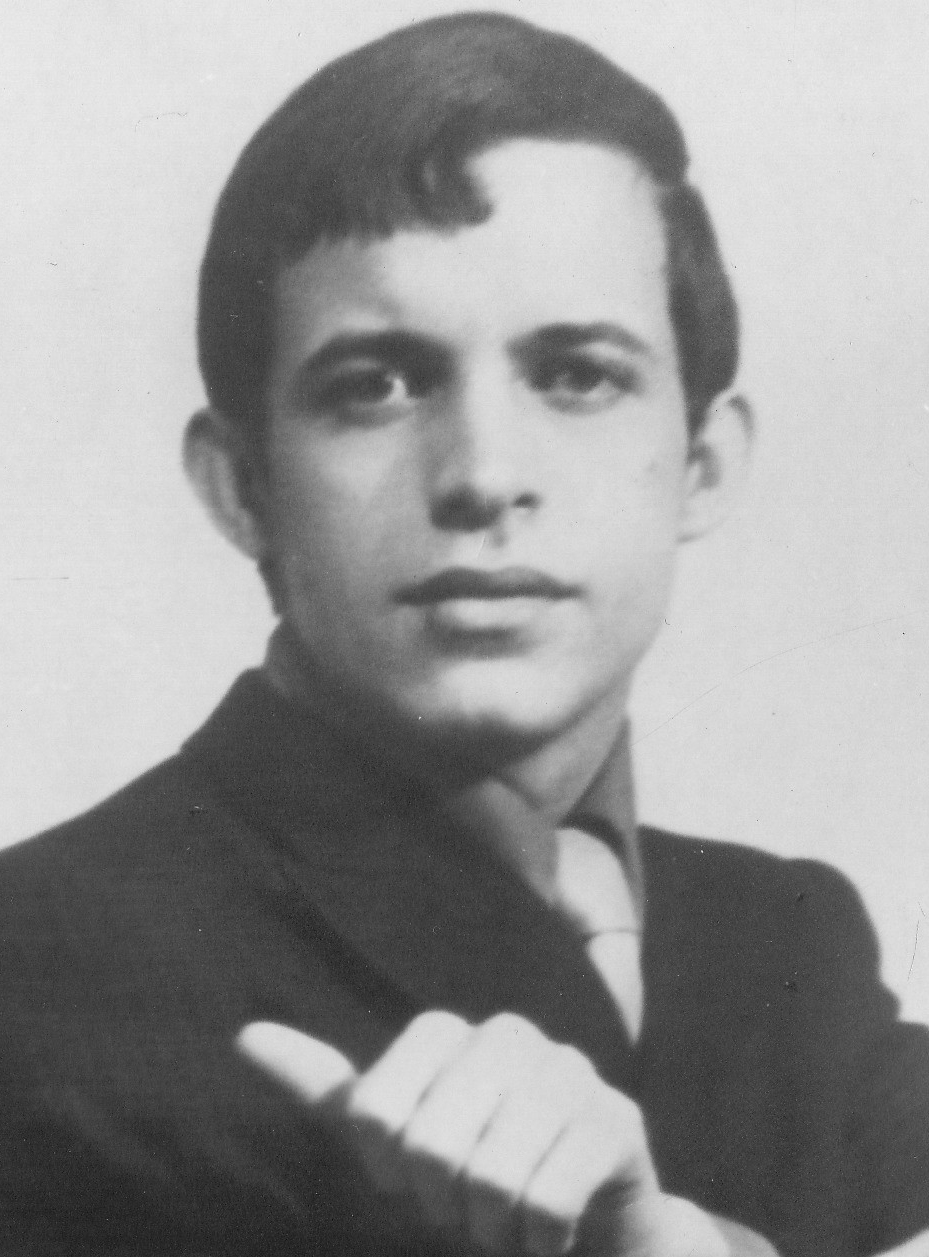
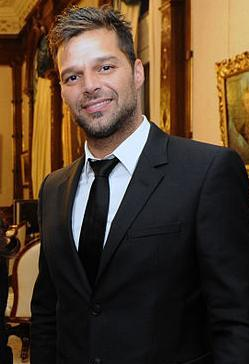
Bad Bunny has cited Daddy Yankee, Héctor Lavoe, and Ricky Martin as some of his main musical inspirations.

Throughout the years, Bad Bunny has listed his musical influences with a wide variety of artists from multiple genres such as Héctor Lavoe, El Gran Combo de Puerto Rico, Vico C, Romeo Santos, Aventura, Juan Luis Guerra, Antony Santos, Raulín Rodríguez, El Chaval de la Bachata, Elvis Crespo, Olga Tañón, Ricky Martin, Juan Gabriel, José Feliciano, Ismael Rivera, Frankie Ruiz, La Sonora Ponceña, Roberto Roena, Daddy Yankee, Don Omar, Ivy Queen, Tego Calderón, Wisin & Yandel, Hector El Father, Tito El Bambino, Calle 13, Rubén Blades, Víctor Manuelle, Gilberto Santa Rosa, and Marc Anthony, amongst many others. He considers himself to be a "music fanatic" which is the reason why so many people inspire him. During an episode of Behind the Music, he talked about Ricky Martin's legacy for Latin music and Latin artists, and how Martin changed the music landscape for future Latin artists.

In the music video for "Neverita", Bad Bunny paid homage to the "Suavemente" music video by Puerto Rican artist Elvis Crespo, leaving a message in the end translated from Spanish as "In honor of the best video of all time". Elvis Crespo later felt honored by his tribute and ended up doing a merengue version of the song himself in which he performed at the 2022 Latin Billboard Music Awards.

=== Musical style ===
"Soy Peor" (2016)
Bad Bunny's breakthrough hit, the song exemplifies the artist's fast-paced vocal style and his Latin trap influences.

"Si Veo a Tu Mamá" (2020)
The song "Si Veo a Tu Mamá" from his album YHLQMDLG samples the bossa nova standard "The Girl from Ipanema" by Antônio Carlos Jobim and features Bad Bunny alternating between rapping and singing.

Bad Bunny is considered to be primarily a Latin trap and reggaeton artist. As described in a Rolling Stone article, Bad Bunny sings and raps with a "conversational tone", employing "a low, slurry tone, viscous melodies, and a rapper's cadence."

Although primarily considered to be a Latin trap and reggaeton artist, his music also incorporates various other elements from other genres such as pop, rock, hip-hop, electronic, reggae, dancehall, dembow, salsa, bossa nova, bomba, bachata, merengue, ballad, house, drill, alternative rock, indie, soul, R&B, and other genres. Some publications have credited him for bringing Latin trap and reggaeton into the global mainstream in the English-language music market.

According to Timothy Monger of AllMusic, his lyrics "range from humor and pathos to heartbreak and anger (sometimes in the same song)". According to Paper, other themes explored in Bad Bunny's music include "self-love, inclusivity, and LGBTQ acceptance".

== Public image ==
=== Fashion ===
Vanessa Rosales of CNN has opined that "in pink, florals and short shorts, Bad Bunny champions a new masculinity". He has appeared at award shows with manicured, polished, and long fingernails. Ben Beaumont-Thomas of The Guardian opined in 2020 that Bunny's style influenced fellow Latin artists, who "often now share his highly colorful mashup of streetwear and tailoring". In 2020, Bad Bunny collaborated with Crocs to create a line of glow-in-the-dark clogs inspired by YHLQMDLG.

Since March 2021, Bad Bunny has routinely collaborated with Adidas to redesign various collections within the Adidas sneaker line to incorporate culturally infused elements that represent Bad Bunny and his life. In his first drop with Adidas, he stated in a press release, "I have always loved sneakers since I was a kid. They were the essential detail of the style I wanted and the look I wanted to have... It's something that defines you and at the same time it brings people together." Bad Bunny has redesigned several sneakers within the Adidas line, such as the Campus, the Forum, and the Gazelle, among others.

In November 2021, Bad Bunny appeared on the cover of Allure, with the magazine showcasing his unconventionality within fashion, which has helped to challenge gender stereotypes in fashion. They noted his playful self-expression on social media as influential in redefining masculinity. When asked about his role in breaking cultural norms, he acknowledged predecessors but credited timing and momentum for his influence.

Bad Bunny was a part of Gucci's Valigeria campaign in 2024. He also served as one of the co-chairs of the 2024 Met Gala, alongside Jennifer Lopez, Zendaya, and Chris Hemsworth. The event was part of the Costume Institute's exhibit Sleeping Beauties: Reawakening Fashion.

In March 2025, Bad Bunny became a global ambassador for Calvin Klein underwear. For its online campaign, he wore the brand's Spring 2025 men's underwear collection, and the advertisement generated $8.4 million in media impact value in 48 hours. The campaign also received more than 3.7 million likes on Instagram and TikTok, while the videos received more than 56 million views. The Calvin Klein campaign video included the song, "EoO." Bad Bunny was featured on the cover of Vogue Mexico and Latin America, photographed by Sebastián Faena, for the May 2025 edition.

=== Activism ===
==== Puerto Rico ====
Bad Bunny criticized the lack of humanitarian aid in the wake of Hurricane Maria, which devastated Puerto Rico in September 2017. Later the same year, Bad Bunny performed at Somos Live! Telethon, a benefit concert for hurricane relief across Puerto Rico, Mexico, and the Caribbean. During his set, Bad Bunny wore a shirt criticizing then-President Donald Trump with the message: "¿Eres Twitero o Presidente?" ("Are You a Twitterer or President?")

On July 22, 2019, Bad Bunny joined artists such as Residente, Ricky Martin, and more than half a million Puerto Ricans in taking the streets and shutting down the Expreso Las Américas, a major highway also known as the Autopista Luis A. Ferré, in protests against government corruption and demanding Ricardo Rosselló's resignation from the office of Governor of Puerto Rico. In May 2020, he had not taken a position regarding the Puerto Rican statehood movement and had stated that he would prefer to answer at a later time with more clarification. He later concluded his answer in January 2021, stating that he would never "want to see Puerto Rico become a State". It was widely understood that he was not necessarily advocating for Puerto Rican independence, only that he opposed the territory ever becoming the 51st state.

Bad Bunny released his music video for "El Apagón" on September 16, 2022. Accompanying the music video was a documentary directed by Kacho Lopez Mari that includes reporting by independent journalist Bianca Graulau. The video criticizes deficiencies in the electrical network and constant blackouts from LUMA Energy, Act 22 of 2012, gentrification in San Juan, and land and beach privatization. Bad Bunny regularly addresses issues of colonialism, displacement, and Puerto Rican resistance in both his public performances and music video, widely recognized in "El Apagón". These works have highlighted issues such as gentrification and privatization of Puerto Rico's infrastructure to an international audience.

After a rally held by Republican nominee Donald Trump at Madison Square Garden in October 2024 ahead of the 2024 United States presidential election, in which comedian Tony Hinchcliffe compared Puerto Rico to a "floating island of garbage in the middle of the ocean," Bad Bunny posted several videos on Instagram of Democratic nominee Kamala Harris that were critical of Trump. He endorsed Juan Dalmau of the Puerto Rican Independence Party in the 2024 Puerto Rico gubernatorial election.

Following the September 2025 announcement of his Super Bowl LX halftime show performance, there was polarized public response, with some commentators calling into question his Americanness and others framing the importance of Puerto Rican visibility and cultural pride on such a large national stage. Having initially axed all U.S. stops on his 2025 tour to protect his fan base from any targeting by U.S. Immigration and Customs Enforcement, Bad Bunny added that he would accept the invitation to perform at the Super Bowl as a form of protest against the system that simultaneously seeks to embrace Latin music while displacing the people of the culture. His decision to headline the Super Bowl LX halftime show has been described as a milestone for Latino representation in U.S. popular culture.

Since the announcement, his fanbase has organized online campaigns celebrating Puerto Rican culture and messages of inclusion in response to criticism of his Super Bowl appearance. Media reports note that many fans have also responded with humor by posting messages about learning Spanish and dancing along with his performance without knowing the words. Others have taken this announcement as an opportunity to publicly educate people about the history of the annexation of Puerto Rico and the continued colonial efforts.

==== Gender violence ====
In 2020, Bad Bunny appeared on The Tonight Show Starring Jimmy Fallon as a musical guest and brought attention to the killing of Alexa Negrón Luciano, a transgender woman from Puerto Rico. He wore a white T-shirt with the words "Mataron a Alexa, no a un hombre con falda" ("They killed Alexa, not a man in a skirt"). That same year, Bad Bunny performed in drag for his music video "Yo Perreo Sola". The performance has been characterized as challenging traditional gender roles within reggaetón and bringing awareness to harassment and violence against women. He further has been characterized as a leading figure in the move to push alternative masculinities, queer visibility, and decolonial perspectives into the mainstream of Latin music.

==== Immigration advocacy ====
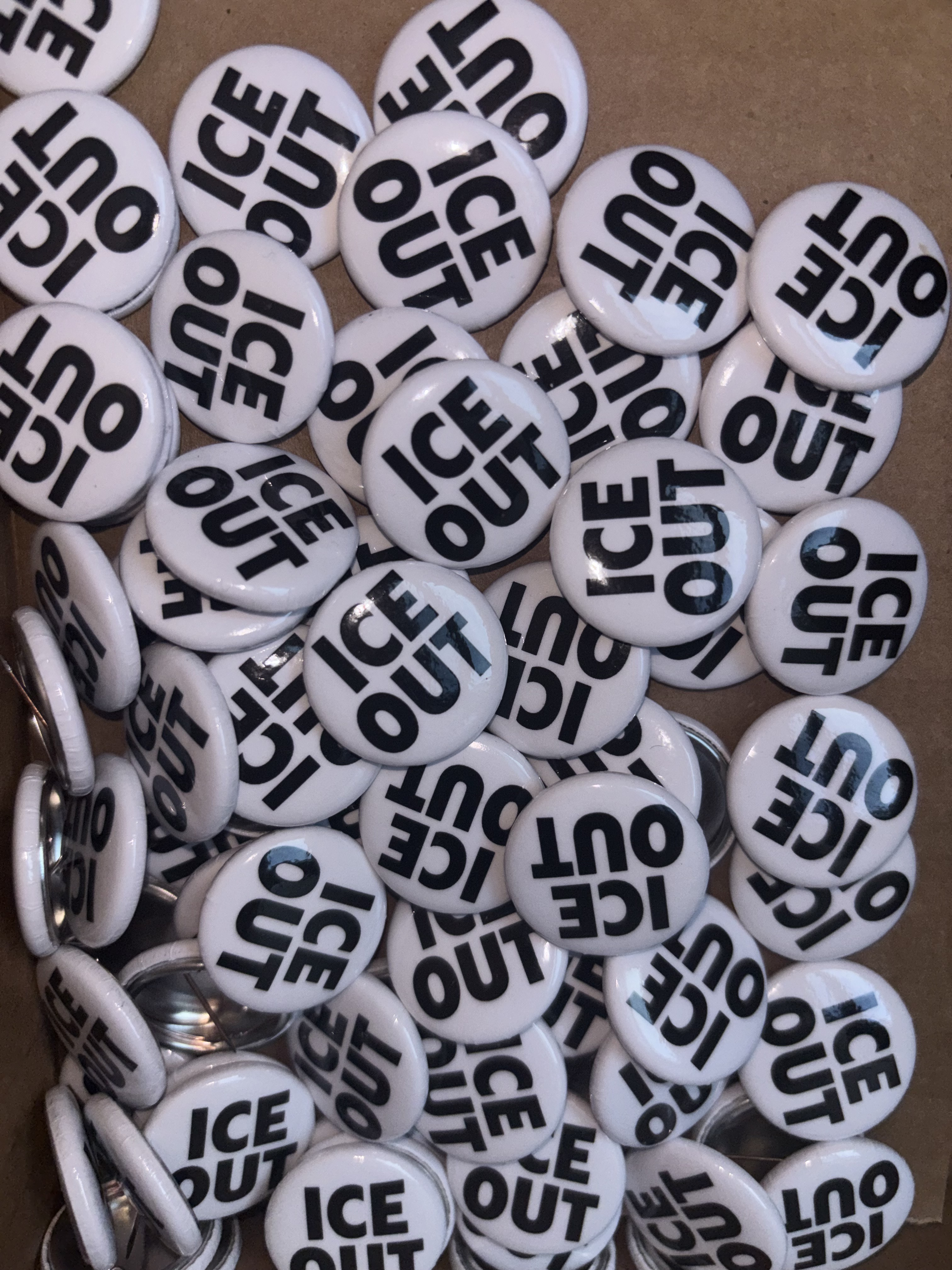
"ICE Out" buttons worn by celebrities during the 2026 awards season in protest of ICE

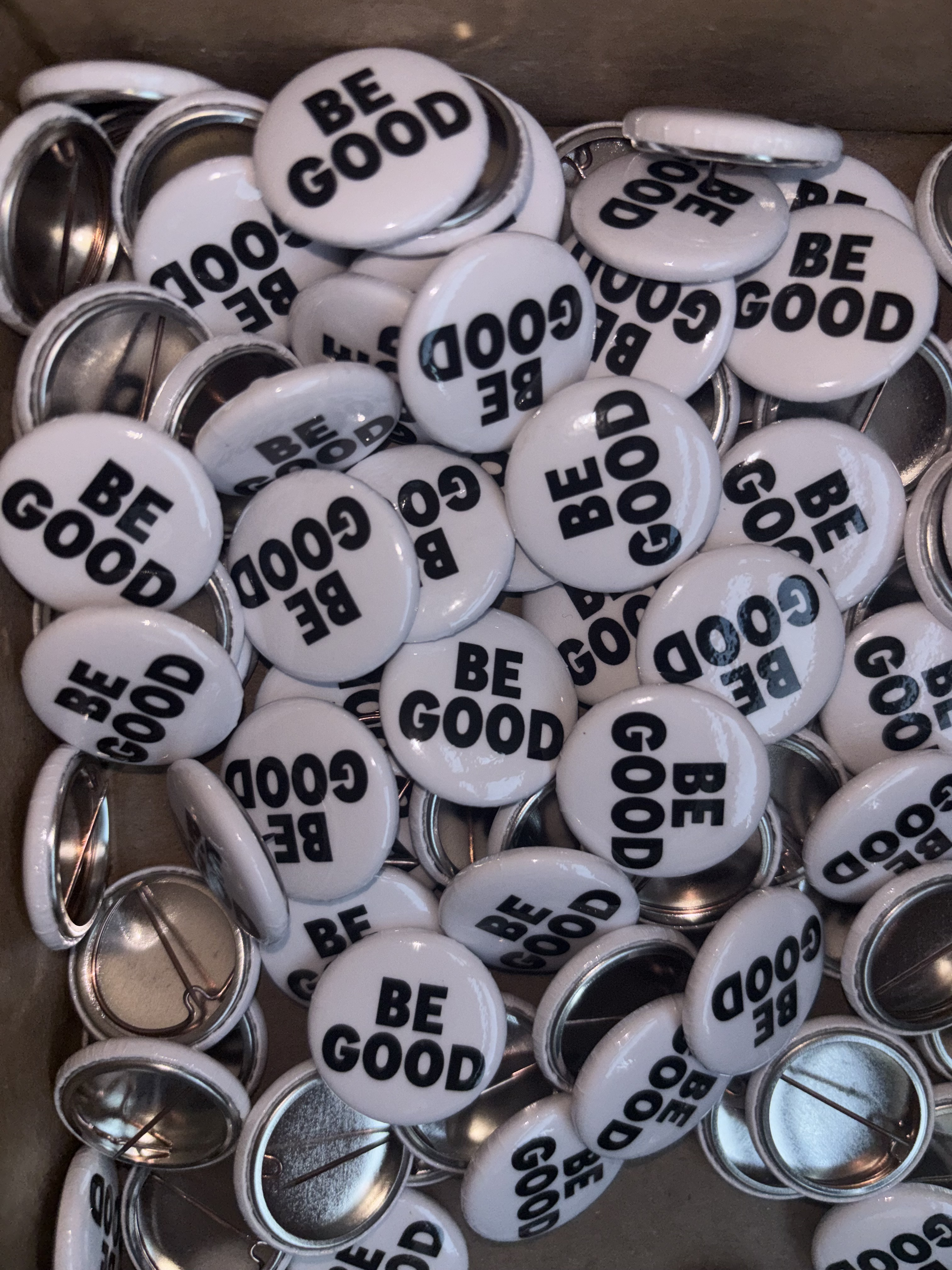
"Be Good" buttons distributed as part of the #BeGood campaign honoring Renee Good and protesting ICE

Bad Bunny has been outspoken against ICE and the Trump administration's immigration enforcement operations. He excluded the continental United States from his 2025–2026 concert tour, stating that he did so out of fear that ICE could raid concert venues and target attendees.

At the 68th Annual Grammy Awards on February 1, 2026, while accepting the award for Best Música Urbana Album for Debí Tirar Más Fotos, Bad Bunny opened his speech by saying "Before I say thanks to God, I'm going to say: ICE out", to a standing ovation from the audience. He continued: "We're not savage, we're not animals, we're not aliens. We are humans and we are Americans", and urged his audience to respond to hate with love rather than more hate. Later that evening, he won Album of the Year, making Debí Tirar Más Fotos the first entirely Spanish-language album to win the award in the ceremony's history. In his acceptance speech, he dedicated the award to "all the immigrants that had left their homeland, their country, to follow their dreams". Several other artists at the ceremony, including Billie Eilish, Justin Bieber, Hailey Bieber, Finneas, Brandi Carlile, Jack Antonoff, and Kehlani, wore "ICE Out" pins in protest of ICE enforcement operations, while Kehlani ended her acceptance speech with "Fuck ICE".

Bad Bunny's comments came amid nationwide protests following the fatal shootings of Renee Good and Alex Pretti by federal agents in Minneapolis the previous month. The following week, he headlined the Super Bowl LX halftime show as the first Latin solo artist to do so, a performance that incorporated themes of Puerto Rican cultural identity and colonialism.

=== Philanthropy ===
Bad Bunny's philanthropic efforts are mostly done through his Good Bunny Foundation (Fundación el Buen Conejo), which was established in 2018. The organization emphasizes youth empowerment, cultural preservation, and community development in Puerto Rico. The foundation collaborates extensively with local governments, educational institutions, corporations, and fellow artists to amplify its impact.

==== Good Bunny Foundation ====
Since 2018, Bad Bunny has hosted an annual holiday event called Bonita Tradición, where he has distributed tens of thousands of toys, musical instruments, sports gear, and art supplies to the youth in Puerto Rico, and hosts cultural events for underprivileged children in Puerto Rico. In January 2025, Bad Bunny personally delivered musical instruments, art kits, and sports equipment to the Ángel L. Rodríguez Rivera court in Vega Baja.

In 2019, Bad Bunny partnered with musician Marc Anthony to donate $1.6 million to rebuild Puerto Rican baseball fields that were destroyed by Hurricanes Irma and María. Their foundations, Good Bunny Foundation and Maestro Cares, collaborated with UNICEF and a nonprofit LISC to reconstruct 25 fields, prioritizing rural municipalities like Vega Baja, Loíza, Yabucoa, and Yauco. The project aimed to create "an upward spiral of opportunities" for 17,500 youth. Bad Bunny stated, "Our commitment is to rebuild these parks so that we can help new athletes grow. This is the first step for the rebirth of sports within the island."

In 2019, he was nominated for Telemundo's inaugural Premios Tu Música Urbano, in the category of "Humanitarian Award of the Year."

In 2024, Bad Bunny and Cheetos launched a $500,000 campaign awarding twenty $25,000 grants to individuals advancing Hispanic communities via art, education, or social projects.

For the Debí Tirar Más Fotos World Tour in 2025, Bad Bunny donated part of the proceeds from ticket sales to the Good Bunny Foundation.

==== Endangered species ====
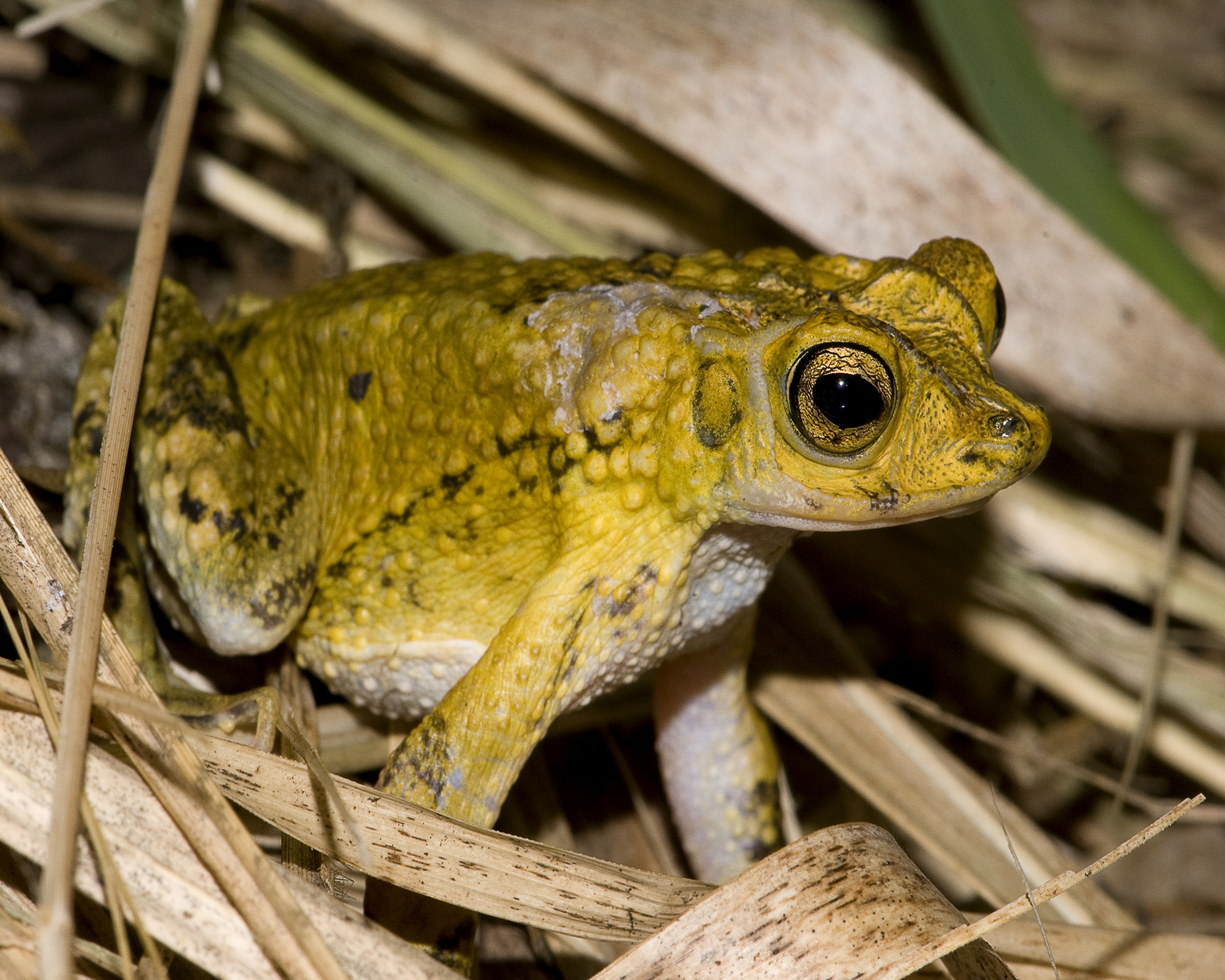
The Puerto Rican Crested Toad, locally known as sapo concho, is on the list of endangered species

In order to promote the album Debí Tirar Más Fotos, he created the character Concho, a Puerto Rican type of toad locally known as sapo concho, which is in the list of endangered amphibians The success of the album has had an impact on the conservation of this amphibian.

== Personal life ==
=== Relationships ===
Martínez is reluctant to publicly discuss his personal life, explaining to Vanity Fair in 2023: "I'm not really interested in clarifying anything because I have no commitment to clarify anything to anyone." He started dating his college sweetheart, lawyer Carliz De La Cruz Hernández, in 2011. They were reportedly engaged in January 2016, but broke up four months later due to their respective careers. The couple briefly reconciled in 2017 before ending their relationship for good.

Martínez entered an on-again, off-again relationship with jewelry designer Gabriela Berlingeri in 2017, after they met at a restaurant following a Zion & Lennox concert. Berlingeri photographed Martínez's historic cover article for Rolling Stone in May 2020, becoming the first Latina in the magazine's history to do so. Her voice was also featured on his single "El Apagón". During their breakups, Martínez dated Argentine rapper Cazzu and American model Kendall Jenner.

=== Legal issues ===
In March 2023, De La Cruz filed a US$40 million lawsuit against Martínez and his manager for using a recording of her voice on the songs "Pa Ti" and "Dos Mil 16" without her permission. Another woman, Tainally Y. Serrano Rivera, filed a US$16 million lawsuit against Martínez in January 2026, claiming that her voice was featured on the songs "Solo de Mi" and "Eoo" without her consent.

=== Sexuality ===
Martínez is sexually fluid, stating to the Los Angeles Times in 2020: "At the end of the day, I don't know if in 20 years I will like a man. One never knows in life. But at the moment I am heterosexual and I like women." He was critical of a nail salon in Asturias, Spain that refused him a manicure in July 2018, and deleted his Twitter account after receiving homophobic comments.

In January 2019, Martínez criticized Don Omar's homophobic social media post aimed at Ozuna. During a February 2020 performance on The Tonight Show Starring Jimmy Fallon, he called attention to the murder of transgender woman Alexa Negrón Luciano in Puerto Rico by wearing a shirt with the words "They Killed Alexa. Not a Man in a Skirt", referencing news reports that misgendered the victim. Ricky Martin described Martínez as "an icon for the Latin queer community" due to his support of LGBTQ Latinos as well as his embrace of drag culture. At the 2022 MTV Video Music Awards, Martínez kissed a male dancer during his performance of "Tití Me Preguntó". He received the GLAAD Vanguard Award from Martin during the 34th GLAAD Media Awards in recognition for his allyship.

== Professional wrestling ==
In 2021, Bad Bunny began making appearances in the American promotion WWE. At the annual Royal Rumble event on January 31, he performed his song "Booker T" live alongside the former wrestler of the same name. Later in the broadcast, he interfered in the men's Royal Rumble match, where he distracted The Miz and John Morrison before performing a top rope dive onto them. He subsequently became a recurring figure on WWE's weekly television program, Monday Night Raw where he allied with Damian Priest in his ensuing feud with The Miz and Morrison. With Priest's assistance, Bad Bunny briefly captured the 24/7 Championship, holding the title for 28 days before relinquishing it. In preparation for his first official match, he spent several months training at the WWE Performance Center in Orlando, Florida. His rivalry with The Miz and Morrison culminated in his in-ring debut at WrestleMania 37, where he and Priest defeated the duo in a tag team match.

At the 2022 Royal Rumble on January 29, Bad Bunny made a surprise return to compete in the men's Royal Rumble match. He eliminated Sheamus and Dolph Ziggler, and lasted until the final five competitors before he was eliminated by the eventual winner, Brock Lesnar. On January 23, 2023, it was announced that he would be featured as a playable pre-order bonus character in the video game WWE 2K23.

Bad Bunny returned to WWE television in April 2023, when he initially joined the Spanish commentary team for WrestleMania 39. During the event, he intervened in a match to assist Rey Mysterio against Dominik Mysterio. This sparked a feud with Dominik's villainous faction, The Judgment Day, which included Bad Bunny's former partner, Damian Priest. After Priest attacked him on an episode of Raw, Bad Bunny aligned with the Latino World Order (LWO) faction to oppose them. He was initially announced as the host for the Backlash event on May 6 in San Juan, Puerto Rico; however, he instead challenged Priest to a highly acclaimed street fight at the event and ultimately defeated him.

== Awards ==
Throughout his career Bad Bunny has received sixteen nominations at the Grammy Awards, winning six times. The awards included Best Latin Pop or Urban Album for YHLQMDLG (2021); Best Música Urbana Album for El Último Tour Del Mundo (2022), Un Verano Sin Ti (2023), and Debí Tirar Más Fotos (2026); and Grammy Award for Best Global Music Performance for "Eoo" (2026). He has also earned seventeen Latin Grammy Awards out of fifty-two nominations. ASCAP Latin Awards recognized him as the Songwriter of the Year in 2020. At the 2022 MTV Video Music Awards, Bad Bunny became the first non-English language artist to win Artist of the Year.

At the 68th Annual Grammy Awards, Bunny became the first artist in the ceremony's history to win Album of the Year with a Spanish-language album, receiving the honor for his sixth studio album Debí Tirar Más Fotos. In his speech, he dedicated the award to immigrants pursuing their dreams. Gavin Newsom, the governor of California, announced that the state would observe February 8, 2026, as Bad Bunny Day to commemorate his Super Bowl halftime performance.

=== Records and achievements ===
Bad Bunny has set numerous records in both Latin and global music. In January 2025, with the release of Debí Tirar Más Fotos, he became the first Latin artist to surpass 100 entries on the Billboard Hot 100, bringing his career total to 113 entries. Of these entries, 41 reached the top 40, 12 reached the top 10, and one—"I Like It" with Cardi B and J Balvin—reached number one. He also holds the record for the most entries on the Hot Latin Songs chart with 189 career entries.

On Spotify, Bad Bunny has been named the platform's most-streamed artist globally a record four times (2020, 2021, 2022, and 2025), making him the first and only artist to achieve this distinction. In 2020, he became the first non-English language artist to top Spotify's year-end most-streamed list. His 2025 total of 19.8 billion streams was driven largely by Debí Tirar Más Fotos, which was also named the most-streamed album globally that year.

His album Un Verano Sin Ti became the most-streamed album in Spotify history and was the first Spanish-language album nominated for the Grammy Award for Album of the Year.

== Discography ==
Solo studio albums

- X 100pre (2018)
- YHLQMDLG (2020)
- El Último Tour Del Mundo (2020)
- Un Verano Sin Ti (2022)
- Nadie Sabe Lo Que Va a Pasar Mañana (2023)
- Debí Tirar Más Fotos (2025)

Collaborative studio albums

- Oasis (with J Balvin) (2019)

== Filmography ==
=== Film ===
Year	Title	Role	Notes	Ref.
2021	F9	Lookout		
2022	Bullet Train	The Wolf	Credited as Benito A. Martínez Ocasio	
2023	Cassandro	Felipe		
2025	Happy Gilmore 2	Oscar Mejías	Credited as Benito A. Martínez Ocasio	
2025	Caught Stealing	Colorado	Credited as Benito Martínez Ocasio	
2026	Toy Story 5	Pizza with Sunglasses (voice)		
TBA	Porto Rico †		Filming	

=== Television ===
Year	Title	Role	Notes	Ref.
2018	Sugar	Himself	Episode: "Bad Bunny pays it back to a deaf fan who loves to dance"	
2021	Royal Rumble	Himself	WWE pay-per-view event Performed his song "Booker T"; Appeared in the Men's Royal Rumble match	
2021	WWE Raw	Himself	Several guest appearances	
2021	Saturday Night Live	Himself	Season 46, Episode 13; Musical Guest, Performed "La Noche de Anoche" with Rosalía and "Te Deseo Lo Mejor"	
2021	Elimination Chamber	Himself	WWE pay-per-view event Appeared in a brief backstage segment with wrestlers The Miz and Damian Priest	
2021	WrestleMania 37	Himself	WWE's flagship pay-per-view event Teamed with Damian Priest in a tag team match to defeat The Miz and John Morrison	
2021	Narcos: Mexico	Everardo Arturo "Kitty" Paez	Recurring	
2022	Royal Rumble	Himself	WWE pay-per-view event Competed in the Men's Royal Rumble match	
2023	WWE SmackDown	Himself	Guest appearance	
2023	Backlash	Himself	WWE pay-per-view event Host of the event Defeated Damian Priest in a San Juan Street Fight	
2023	Saturday Night Live	Himself (host and musical guest)/Various Roles	Season 49, Episode 2 Host and Musical Guest, performed "Un Preview" and "Mónaco".	
2025	Saturday Night Live 50th Anniversary Special	Himself (musical guest), Santiago	Television special, NBC	
2025	Saturday Night Live	Himself (musical guest)/Various Roles	Season 50, Episode 20; Musical Guest, performed "Nuevayol" and "Perfumito Nuevo" with RaiNao	
2025	Saturday Night Live	Himself (Host)/Various Roles	Season 51, Episode 1 Host	

=== Video games ===
Year	Title	Role	Notes	Ref.
2023	WWE 2K23	Himself	Voice and likeness. Included as a pre-order bonus	
2024	WWE 2K24	Himself	Voice and likeness	
2026	Grand Theft Auto VI	Mitico Mario, El Martillo (co-host of Cocoteo FM)	Double voice role	

== Tours and residencies ==
Headlining tours

- La Nueva Religión Tour (2018)
- X 100pre Tour (2019)
- El Último Tour del Mundo (2022)
- World's Hottest Tour (2022)
- Most Wanted Tour (2024)
- Debí Tirar Más Fotos World Tour (2025–2026)

Residencies

- No Me Quiero Ir de Aquí (2025)
