= Adidas Rivalry =

Line of shoes by Adidas

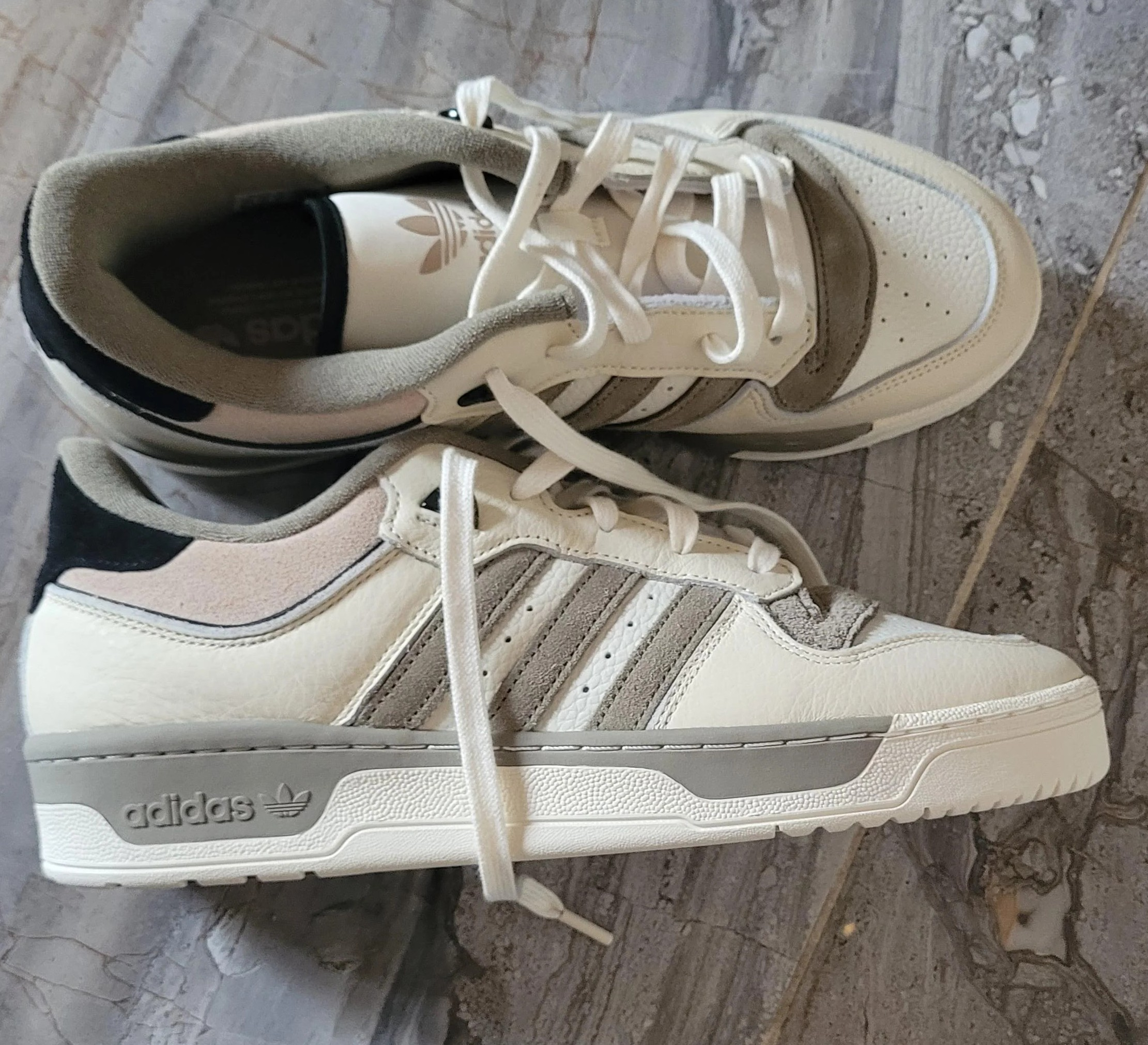
- A pair of Adidas Rivalry in a low top
- Type: Sneakers
- Inventor: Adidas
- Inception: 1986; 40 years ago
- Manufacturer: Adidas
- Available: Yes

Adidas Rivalry is a line of shoes released by Adidas. The shoes were developed for basketball when they were released in 1986.

== Overview ==
The shoe was designed by French designer Jacques Chassaing who had previously worked on the Adidas Forum. The shoe was released in collaboration with Patrick Ewing as part of a collection called the "Ewing Collection". The shoes included the Ewing Conductor, Ewing Rivalry Hi, and the Ewing Rivalry Lo.

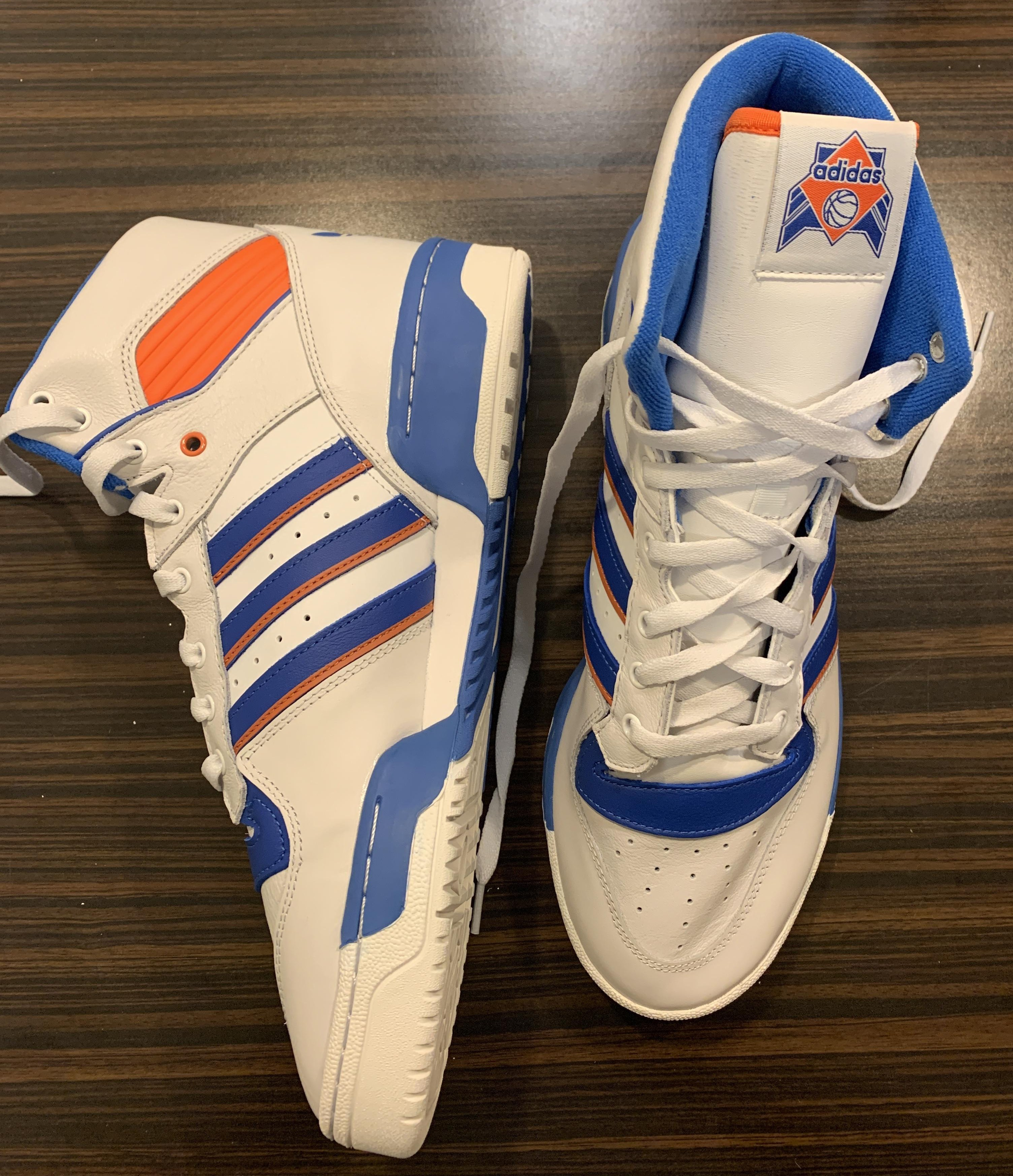
Adidas Rivalry in a high top in the New York Knicks colorway

The Rivalry was created as the cheaper alternative to the Conductor. It features full-grain leather overlays with a more streamlined design and a grippy rubber outsole compared to previous models. The tongue of all the shoes featured Ewing's name as a logo to distinguish them as his line. Later re-releases rebranded the shoes as the Adidas Conductor and Adidas Rivalry with "Ewing" on the logo replaced with "Adidas" after Patrick Ewing parted ways with the company.

The shoes would see numerous re-releases over the years but would not become extremely popular until the early 2020s thanks to social media site Tik Tok where many users started sharing their own pairs of the sneakers. The popularity led Adidas to re-releasing the shoe again and release multiple collaborations.
