= List of most-streamed artists on Spotify =

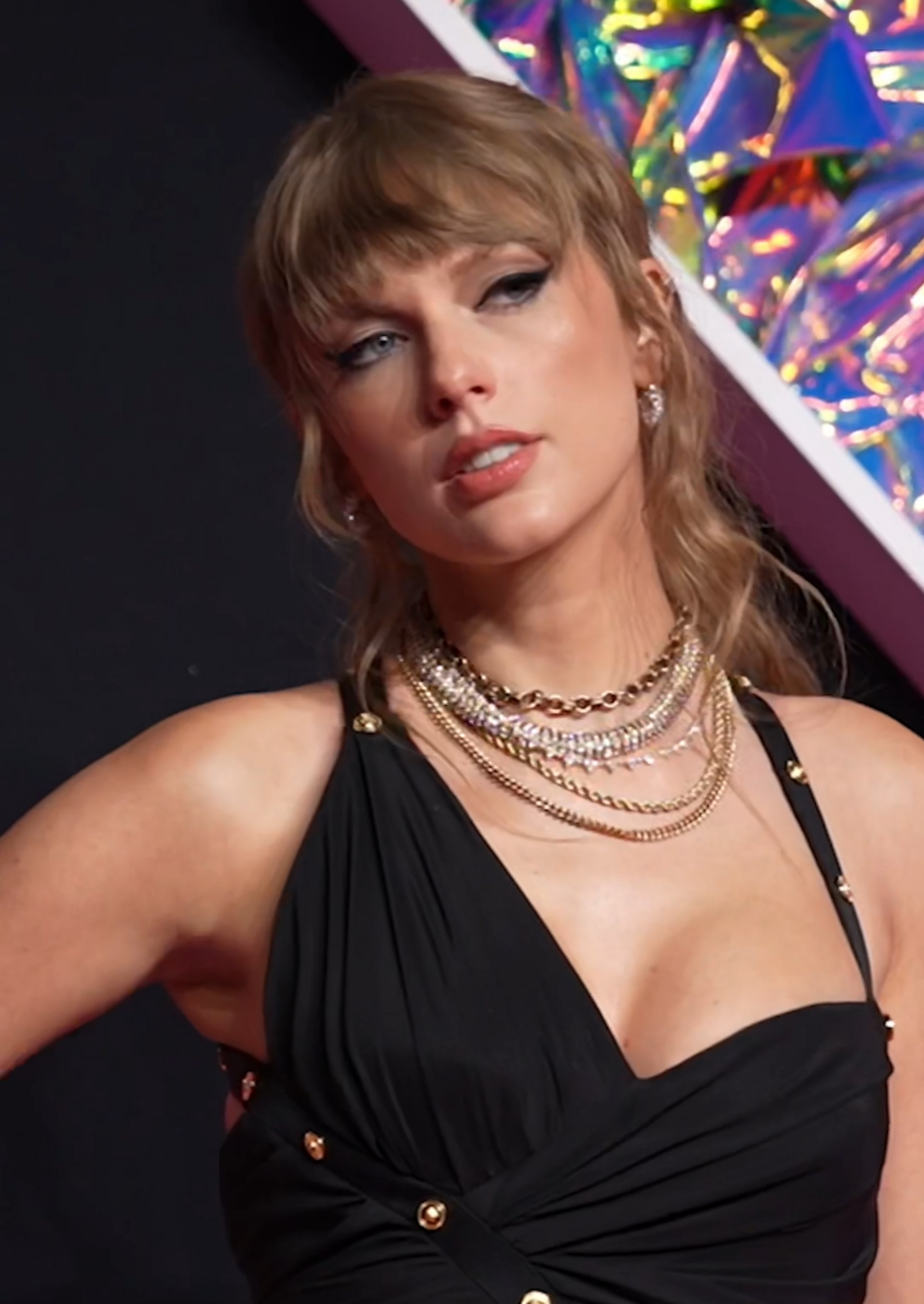
American singer-songwriter Taylor Swift is the most-streamed artist in Spotify's history.

The following list contains the most-streamed artists on the audio streaming platform Spotify. As of April 2026, Taylor Swift is the most-streamed artist in Spotify's history. Bad Bunny is the most-streamed male artist.

Since 2013, Spotify has published a yearly list of its most-streamed artists, which has been topped by Bad Bunny a record four times (2020–2022; 2025), being the only artist to do so in three consecutive years. Drake has topped the list three times (2015–2016; 2018), while Swift is the only female artist to have topped the list (2023–2024).

== Most-streamed artists ==
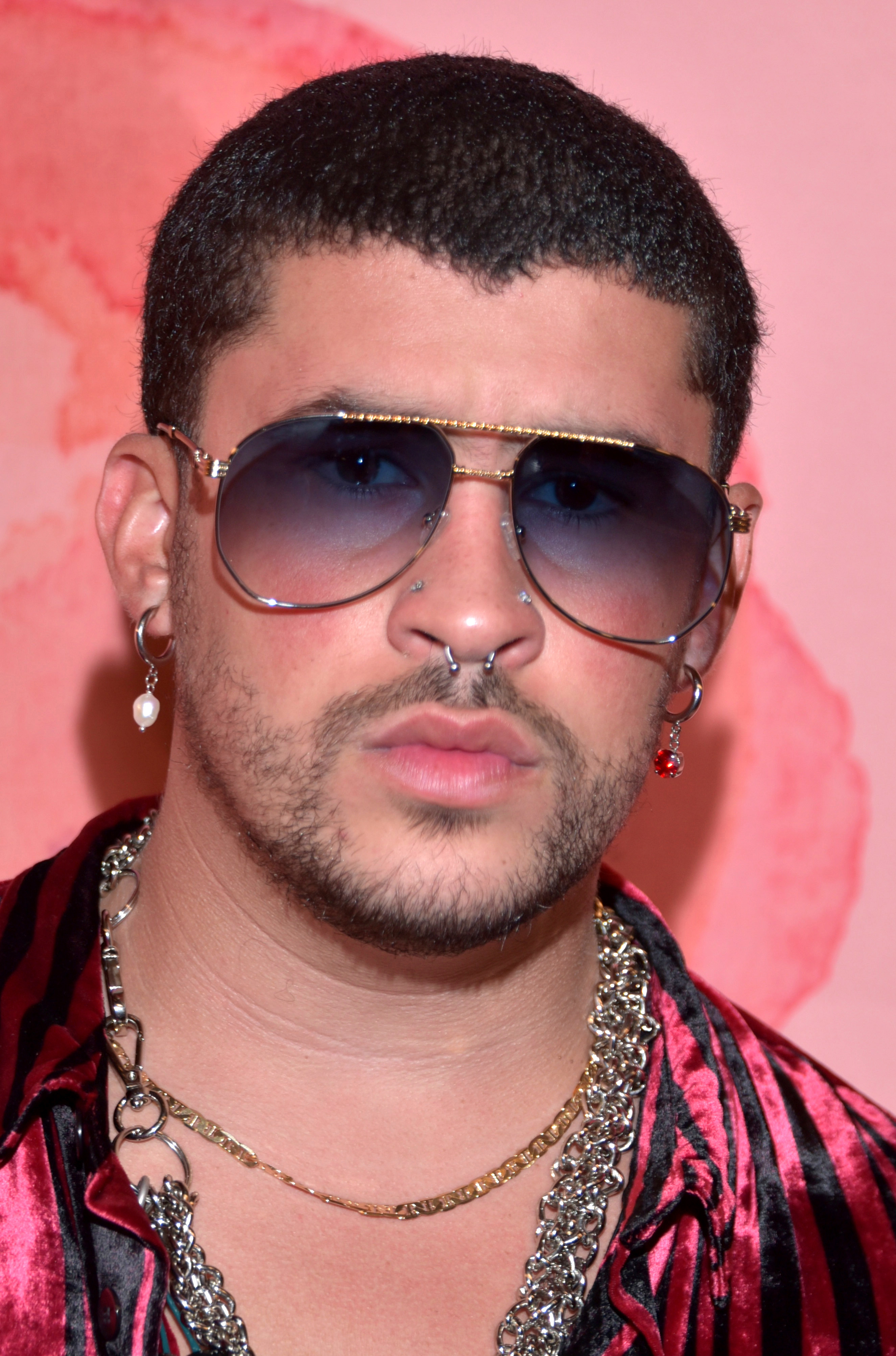
Puerto Rican rapper Bad Bunny is the most-streamed male artist in Spotify's history.

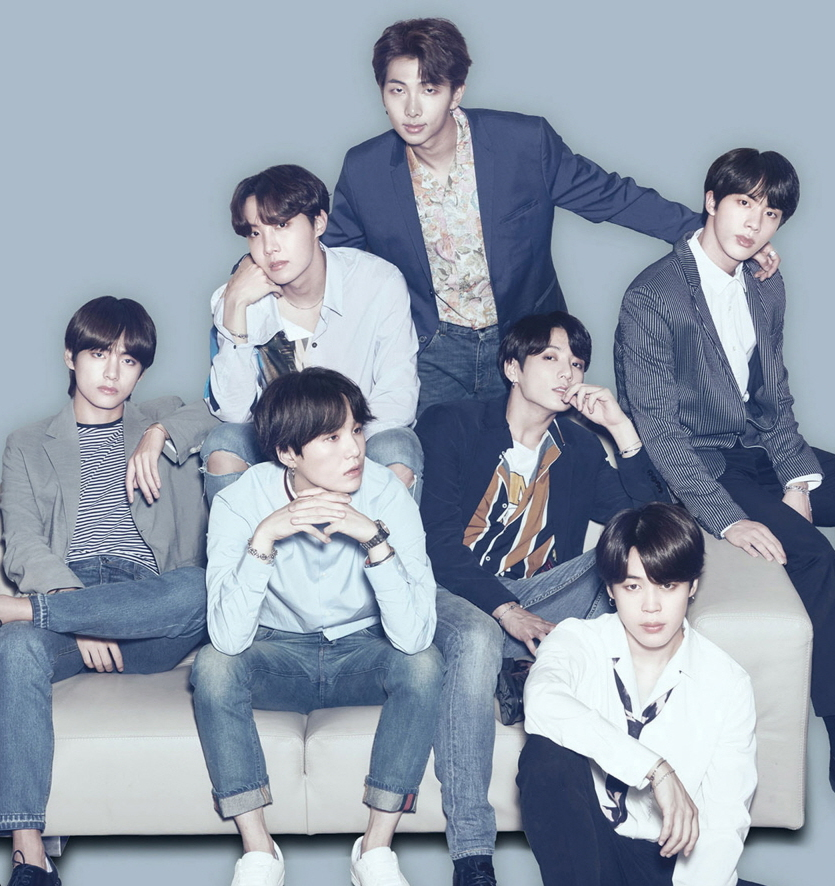
South Korean boy band BTS is the most-streamed group in Spotify's history.

=== By year ===
Number of streams are listed in parentheses, where available.

Year	Artist ranking				
Year	1	2	3	4	5
2013	Macklemore & Ryan Lewis	Avicii	Daft Punk	Eminem	Imagine Dragons
2014	Ed Sheeran (860 million)	Eminem	Coldplay	Calvin Harris	Katy Perry
2015	Drake (1.8 billion)	Ed Sheeran	The Weeknd	Maroon 5	Kanye West
2016	Drake (4.7 billion)	Justin Bieber	Rihanna	Twenty One Pilots	Kanye West
2017	Ed Sheeran (6.3 billion)	Drake	The Weeknd	Kendrick Lamar	The Chainsmokers
2018	Drake (8.2 billion)	Post Malone	XXXTentacion	J Balvin	Ed Sheeran
2019	Post Malone (6.5 billion)	Billie Eilish	Ariana Grande	Ed Sheeran	Bad Bunny
2020	Bad Bunny (8.3 billion)	Drake	J Balvin	Juice Wrld	The Weeknd
2021	Bad Bunny (9.1 billion)	Taylor Swift	BTS	Drake	Justin Bieber
2022	Bad Bunny (18.5 billion)	Taylor Swift	Drake	The Weeknd	BTS
2023	Taylor Swift (26.1 billion)	Bad Bunny	The Weeknd	Drake	Peso Pluma
2024	Taylor Swift (26.6 billion)	The Weeknd	Bad Bunny	Drake	Billie Eilish
2025	Bad Bunny (19.8 billion)	Taylor Swift	The Weeknd	Drake	Billie Eilish

=== By decade ===
Number of streams are listed in parentheses, where available.

Decade	Artist ranking				
Decade	1	2	3	4	5
2010s	Drake (28 billion)	Ed Sheeran	Post Malone	Ariana Grande	Eminem

=== First 10 years ===
The most streamed artists in the first 10 years of the availability of Spotify. While founded in 2006, the company officially launched in 2008.

Years	Artist ranking									
Years	1	2	3	4	5	6	7	8	9	10
2008–2018	Drake	Ed Sheeran	Eminem	The Weeknd	Rihanna	Kanye West	Coldplay	Justin Bieber	Calvin Harris	Ariana Grande

=== First 20 years ===
The most streamed artists in the first 20 years of the existence of Spotify. While founded in 2006, the company officially launched in 2008, so in only 18 of the 20 years were artists available to listen to.

Years	Artist ranking									
Years	1	2	3	4	5	6	7	8	9	10
2006–2026	Taylor Swift	Bad Bunny	Drake	The Weeknd	Ariana Grande	Ed Sheeran	Justin Bieber	Billie Eilish	Eminem	Kanye West

== Most monthly listeners ==
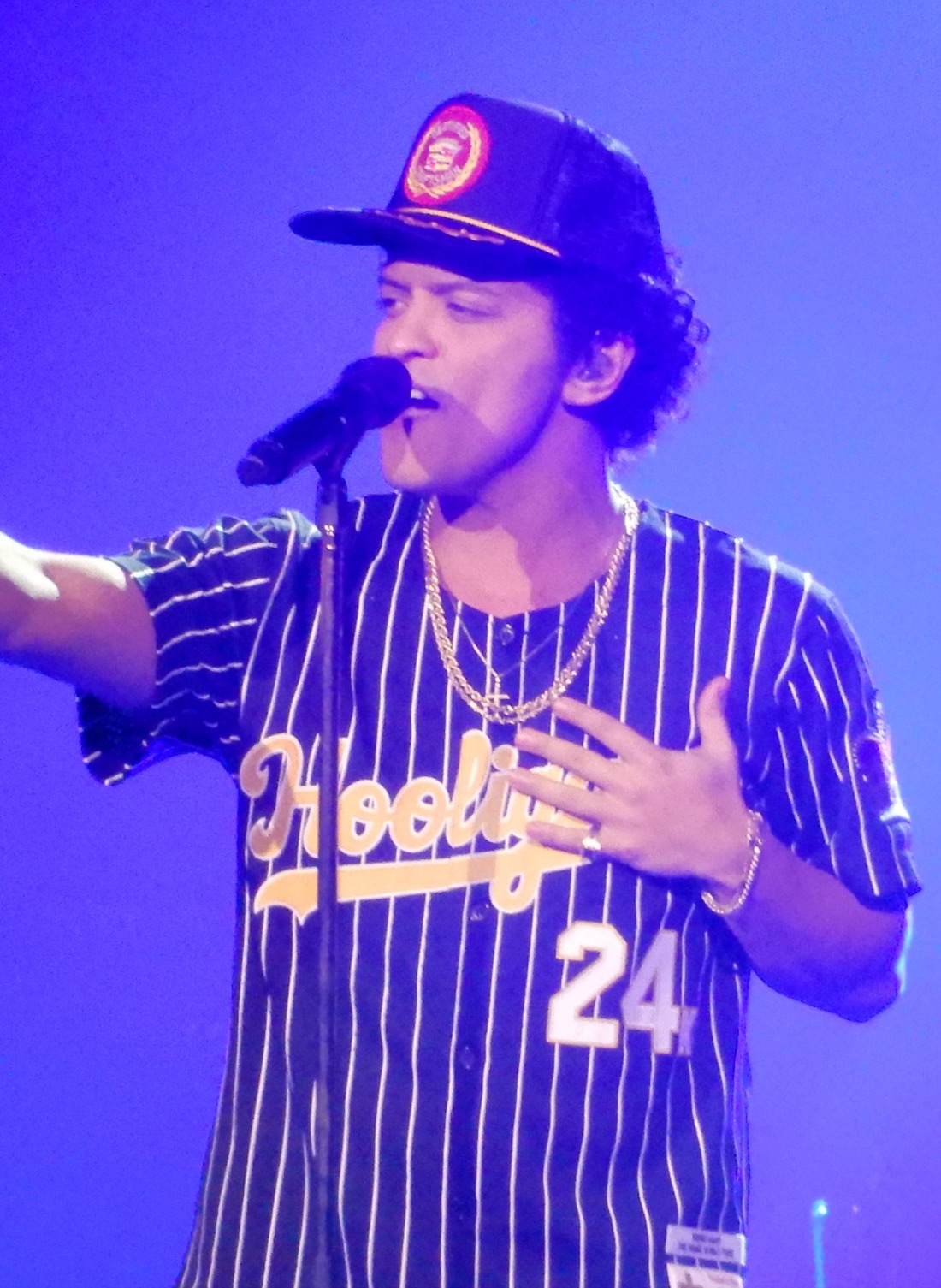
American singer-songwriter Bruno Mars is currently the artist with the most monthly listeners on Spotify

As of November 2026, American singer-songwriter Bruno Mars is the artist with the most monthly listeners. Canadian singer-songwriter The Weeknd was the first artist to surpass 100 million monthly listeners, while American singer-songwriter Taylor Swift was the first female artist and second overall. American singer-songwriter Billie Eilish was the third and youngest to achieve the feat. American rapper Kendrick Lamar was the first rapper to achieve the feat. American singer-songwriter Michael Jackson is the oldest to surpass 100 million monthly listeners. Colombian singer-songwriter Shakira is the most recent to surpass 100 million monthly listeners. British band Coldplay are the first group to surpass 100 million monthly listeners.

Rank	Artist	Monthly listeners (millions)	Ref(s).
1	Bruno Mars	122.9	
2	The Weeknd	117.1	
3	Rihanna	116.5	
4	Justin Bieber	113	
5	Lady Gaga	101.1	
6	Ariana Grande	97	
7	Taylor Swift	96.2	
8	Drake	94	
9	Coldplay	90.1	
10	Bad Bunny	89.3	
11	Michael Jackson	88.7	
12	Katy Perry	85.4	
13	Shakira	84.1	
14	Ed Sheeran	81.7	
15	David Guetta	80.2	
16	Billie Eilish	78.1	
17	Maroon 5	75.9	
18	Olivia Rodrigo	75	
19	Lana Del Rey	74.5	
20	Eminem	73.6	
21	Pitbull	73.2	
22	SZA	73	
23	Sia	72.7	
24	Karol G	71.2	
25	Kanye West	71.2	
26	Calvin Harris	71.2	
27	J Balvin	71	
28	Dua Lipa	70	
29	Kendrick Lamar	68.2	
30	Daddy Yankee	67.4	
31	Tame Impala	66.4	
32	Harry Styles	64.4	
33	Travis Scott	61.9	
34	Black Eyed Peas	61.8	
35	Beyoncé	61.2	
36	Post Malone	60.7	
37	Adele	59.4	
38	Miley Cyrus	57.5	
39	Arctic Monkeys	57	
40	Linkin Park	56.6	
41	Shreya Ghoshal	56.5	
42	Justin Timberlake	56.4	
43	Doja Cat	55.9	
44	Sean Paul	55.9	
45	Tate McRae	55.5	
46	Sombr	55.3	
47	Chris Brown	54.7	
48	Sam Smith	54.7	
49	Britney Spears	54.4	
50	Halsey	54.3	
As of November 21, 2026

== Most-followed artists ==
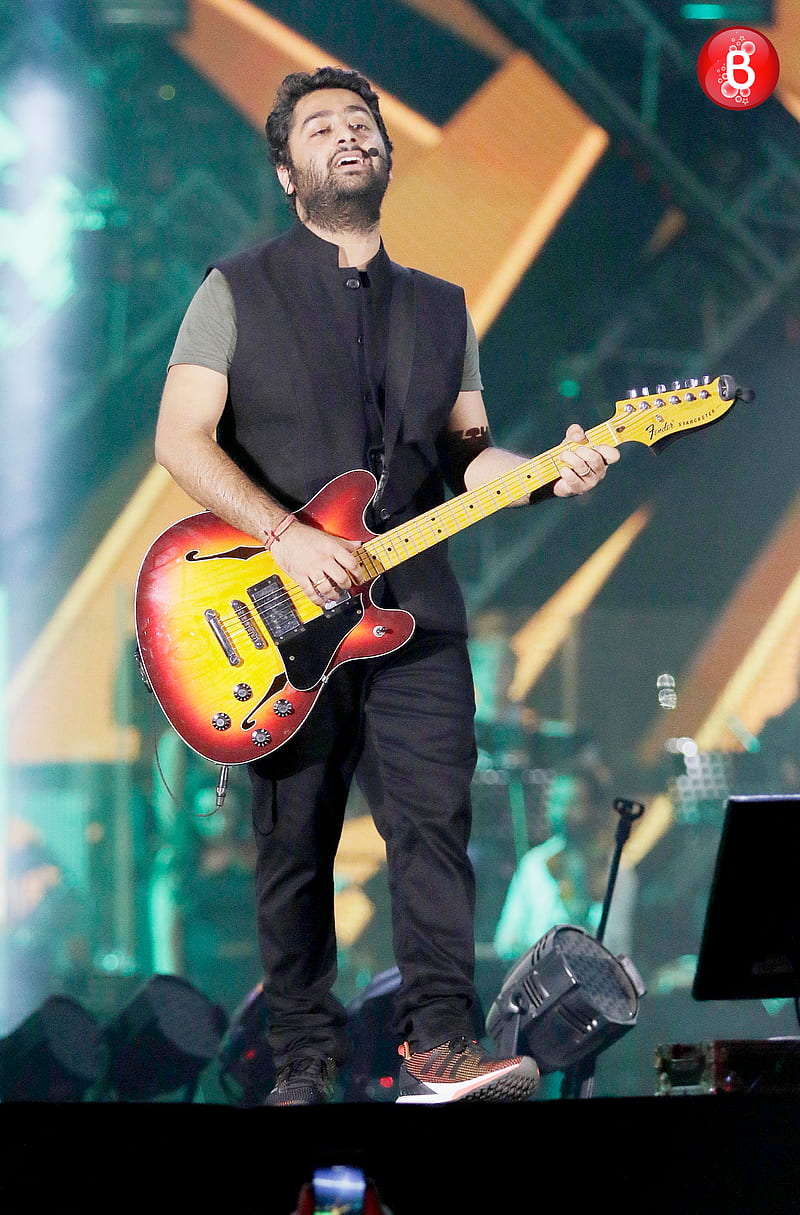
Indian playback singer Arijit Singh is the most-followed artist on Spotify.

As of May 2026, Indian playback singer Arijit Singh is the most-followed artist and Taylor Swift is the most-followed female artist on Spotify.

Rank	Artist	Followers (millions)	Ref(s).
1	Arijit Singh	197.3	
2	Taylor Swift	166.5	
3	Billie Eilish	132.1	
4	The Weeknd	130.1	
5	Ed Sheeran	129	
6	Bad Bunny	126.3	
7	Drake	119.3	
8	Ariana Grande	116.5	
9	Eminem	113.2	
10	Justin Bieber	97.9	
11	BTS	90.7	
12	Bruno Mars	90.6	
13	A.R. Rahman	86.2	
14	Pritam	78.7	
15	Rihanna	77.9	
16	Adele	73.4	
17	Karol G	68.2	
18	Coldplay	66.1	
19	Lana Del Rey	62.2	
20	Blackpink	61.5	
21	Imagine Dragons	61	
22	Queen	59	
23	Olivia Rodrigo	58.6	
24	Michael Jackson	57.3	
25	XXXTentacion	55.6	
26	Selena Gomez	55.3	
27	Anirudh Ravichander	53.5	
28	Sidhu Moose Wala	53.3	
29	Anuel AA	51.8	
30	Neha Kakkar	50.7	
31	Atif Aslam	50.2	
32	Maroon 5	49.7	
33	Post Malone	49.6	
34	Lady Gaga	49.5	
34	Dua Lipa	49.5	
35	Kendrick Lamar	49.5	
37	Shawn Mendes	48.1	
38	Juice Wrld	47.4	
39	Shakira	47	
40	Yo Yo Honey Singh	46.4	
41	Travis Scott	45.6	
42	Beyoncé	44.1	
43	Diljit Dosanjh	43.2	
44	Katy Perry	43	
45	Alan Walker	42.7	
46	J Balvin	42.6	
44	One Direction	42.4	
48	Ozuna	42.4	
49	Maluma	42.3	
50	Marília Mendonça	41.6	
As of November 14, 2026

== Timeline of peak monthly listeners ==
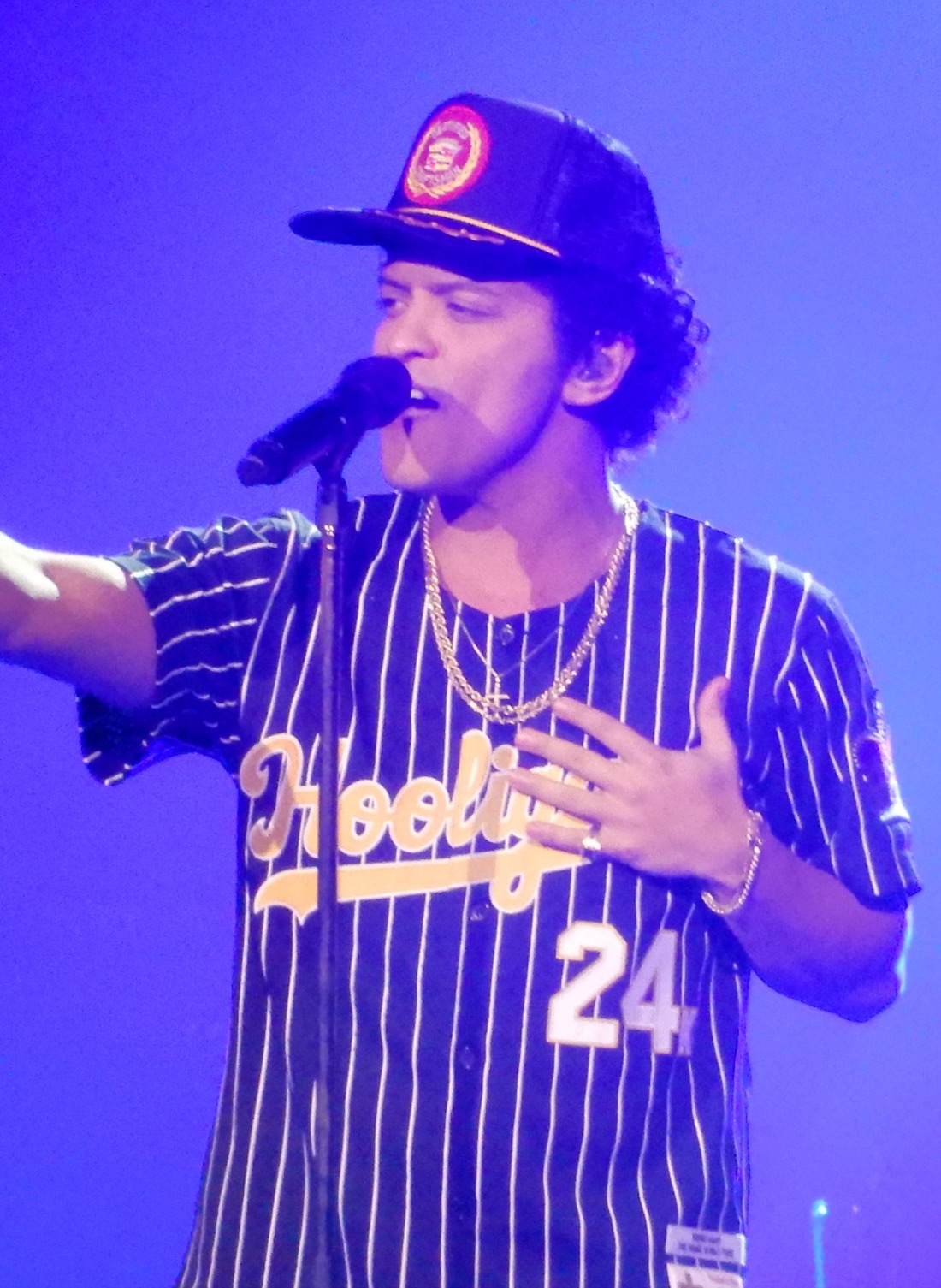
American singer-songwriter Bruno Mars is the artist with the highest recorded number of monthly listeners.

This is a timeline of artists who had the most monthly listeners on Spotify since September 2015, when the feature was made public.

Indicates most streamed artist of the year (Note: For the years 2019 to 2022, and 2024 to 2025, the most streamed artist of the year did not top the monthly listeners list.)
Indicates peak of most monthly listeners in Spotify history

The artist with the most monthly listeners
Year	January	February	March	April	May	June	July	August	September	October	November	December
2026	Bruno Mars				Justin Bieber	Bruno Mars						
2025	Bruno Mars								The Weeknd			
2024	The Weeknd								Billie Eilish	The Weeknd	Bruno Mars	
2023	The Weeknd										Taylor Swift	
2022	Justin Bieber	The Weeknd	Ed Sheeran								Taylor Swift	The Weeknd
2021	Ariana Grande	The Weeknd		Justin Bieber								
2020	Ed Sheeran	Justin Bieber		The Weeknd							Ariana Grande	
2019	Ariana Grande		The Weeknd	Ariana Grande	Khalid	The Weeknd	Ed Sheeran	The Weeknd		Ed Sheeran		
2018	The Weeknd				Drake						Selena Gomez	Ariana Grande
2017	The Weeknd	Ed Sheeran			The Weeknd	Ed Sheeran	Daddy Yankee	The Weeknd	Ed Sheeran			
2016	Justin Bieber			Rihanna		Drake						The Weeknd
2015	—								The Weeknd			Justin Bieber

=== By number of months ===
Artist	Number (share)	Last month	First month
The Weeknd	49 months (36.6%)	December 2025	September 2015
Ed Sheeran	21 months (15.7%)	October 2022	February 2017
Bruno Mars	19 months (14.2%)	October 2026	November 2024
Justin Bieber	17 months (12.7%)	May 2026	December 2015
Drake	12 months (9%)	October 2018	June 2016
Ariana Grande	7 months (5.2%)	January 2021	December 2018
Taylor Swift	3 months (2.2%)	December 2023	November 2022
Rihanna	2 months (1.5%)	May 2016	April 2016
Billie Eilish	1 month (0.7%)	August 2024	
Khalid	1 month (0.7%)	May 2019	
Selena Gomez	1 month (0.7%)	November 2018	
Daddy Yankee	1 month (0.7%)	July 2017	
Total months	134	As of September 2026	

== See also ==
- List of Spotify streaming records
- List of most-viewed YouTube channels
- List of most-subscribed YouTube channels
- List of most-followed Facebook pages
- List of most-followed TikTok accounts
- List of most-followed Twitch channels
- List of most-followed Twitter accounts
- List of most-followed Instagram accounts
