= Nike Terminator =

Line of shoes by Nike

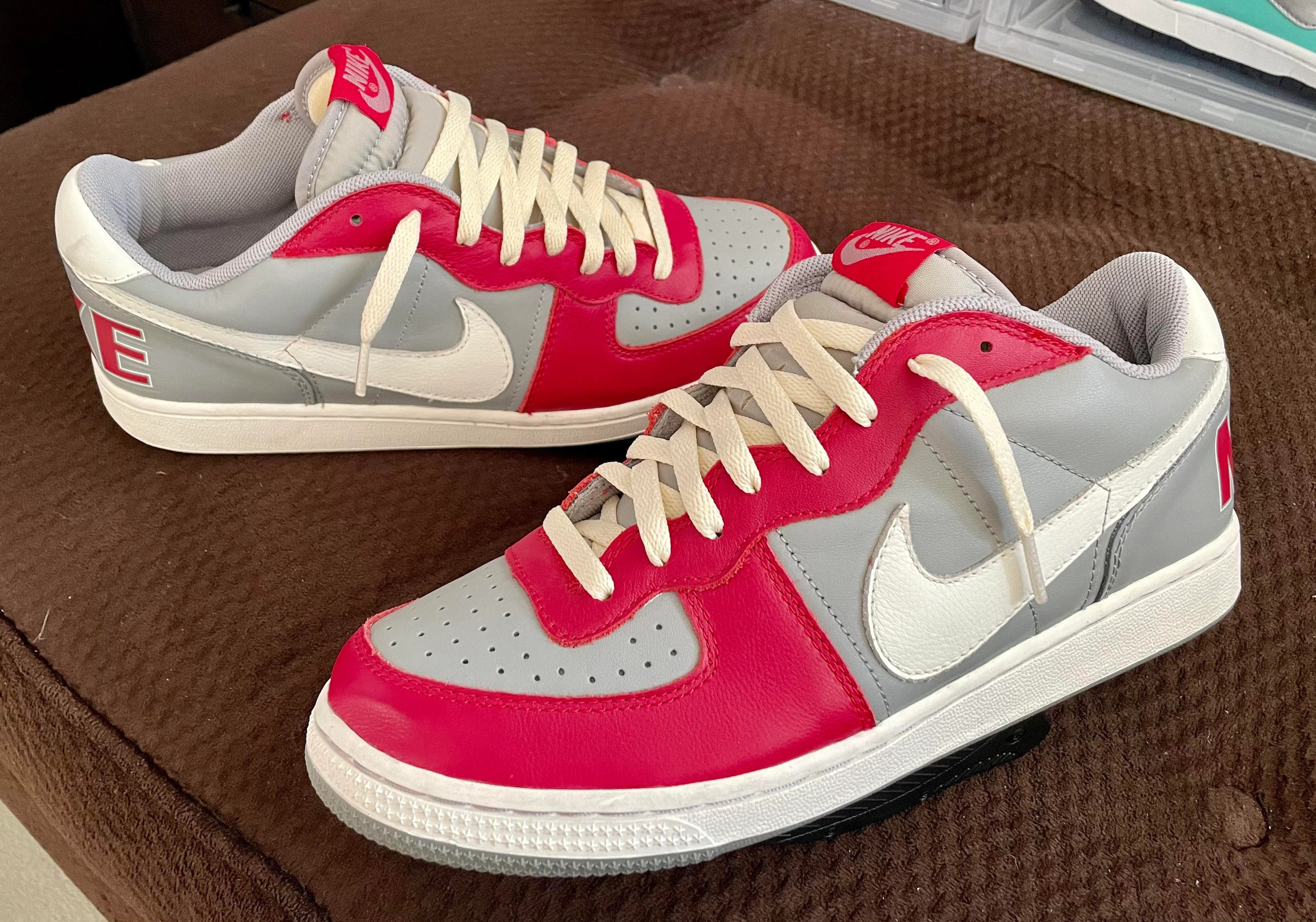
- Type: Sneakers
- Inventor: Nike, Inc.
- Inception: 1985; 41 years ago
- Manufacturer: Nike

Nike Terminator is a basketball shoe made by the multinational company Nike, Inc. that was introduced in 1985.

== Overview ==
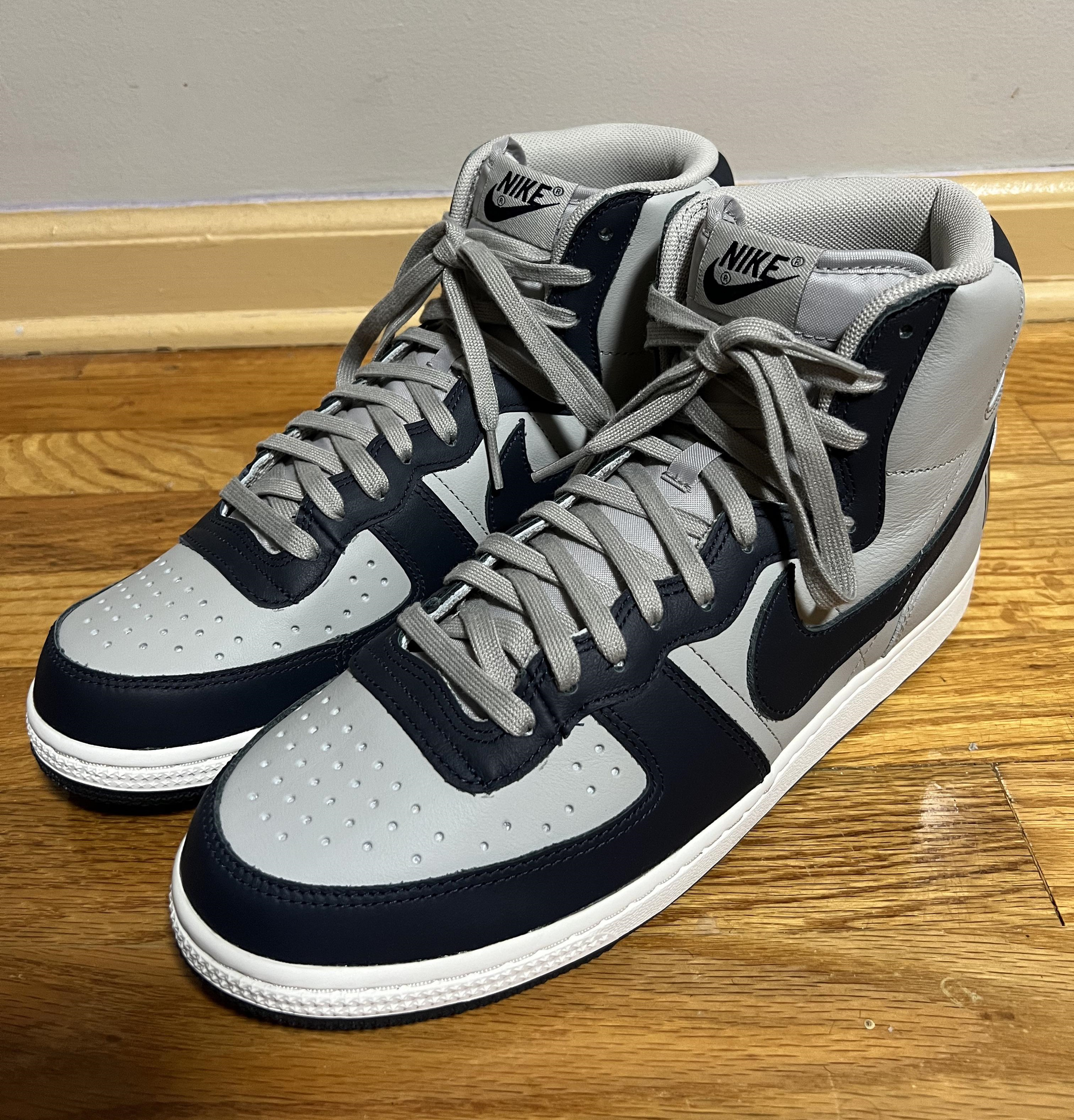
The Nike Terminator in a high

The Nike Terminator is distinguished by the word "Nike" written in large letters across the heel of the shoe. The Terminator also has a lace loop on the heel to facilitate wrapping the laces around the shoe.

Nike created versions of the Terminator named after the colleges Georgetown, Michigan, and St. John's, with colorways based on the team colors of those college basketball teams. Some shoes were specifically made for Georgetown players, with "Hoyas" on the heel instead of "Nike". A special edition Terminator High Supreme "Thrash Metal Pack" with a black and gold colorway was also released.

In 2022, Nike revived the Terminator by introducing them in their original colorways. The following year in 2023, they revived low variants as well.

NBA legend LeBron James has released a Barbie doll of himself wearing a high top pair of Nike Terminators in blue and white.

== See also ==
- List of basketball shoe brands
