= Adidas Forum =

Line of shoes by Adidas

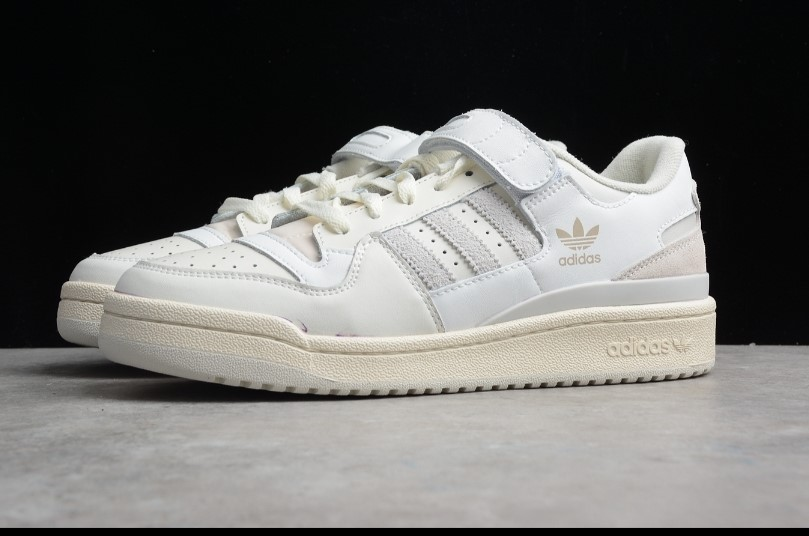
- Type: Sneakers
- Inventor: Adidas
- Inception: 1984; 42 years ago
- Manufacturer: Adidas
- Available: Yes
- Website: adidas.com

Adidas Forum is a line of shoes released by Adidas in 1984. The shoe was originally released as a basketball shoe and was the first shoe by the company to be offered in a low model.

== Overview ==
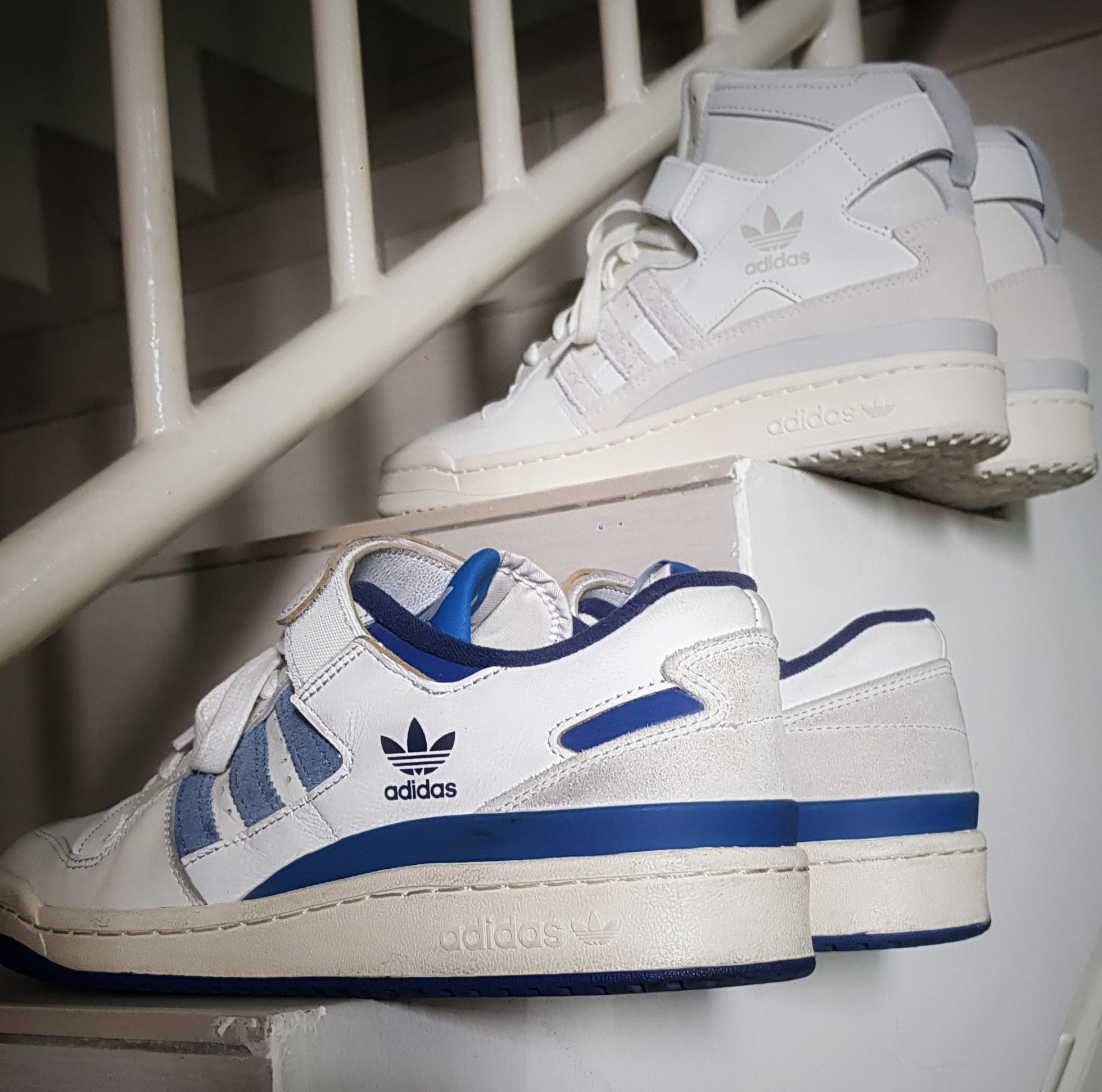
Adidas Forum in a high and low top

Work on creating the shoe first started in 1983 when French designer Jacques Chassaing decided to create a basketball shoe with input from professional players. He and a team went out and asked various players what they wanted to see in a basketball shoe so they could design the best shoe to play in. This eventually led to the creation of the "criss-cross ankle system" which was used to stabilize the players' feet while in the shoe.

The popularity of the shoe was seen with various professional basketball players wearing the shoes in games. Most notable being Michael Jordan who, before signing with Nike, wore these pair while participating in the 1984 Olympics as he was an avid fan of the Adidas brand. The popularity of the shoe went beyond the sport with skaters using the shoe thanks in part to its good traction and stabilization that it offered and many in the streetwear scene due in part to its unique silhouette.

In 2020, Adidas decided to relaunch the shoe as part of its Adidas Originals and saw massive success from the release. The popularity has led to a collaboration with Bad Bunny on the sneakers.

== Models ==
=== Forum CL ===
The Forum CL is a special version of the shoe that comes without the straps.

=== Forum ADV ===
The Forum also got a special skateboarding version with a stronger upper made out of leather and suede in addition to better materials for durability.

=== Forum2000 ===
Similar to the Campus 00s, the Forum2000 is a 2000s inspired version of the shoe that was released in January 2025. The shoe was inspired by chunkier shoes and skates shoes from the era. They feature a chunkier tongue, upper, and laces as well as oversized stripes on the sides.
