= Adidas Campus =

Line of shoes by Adidas

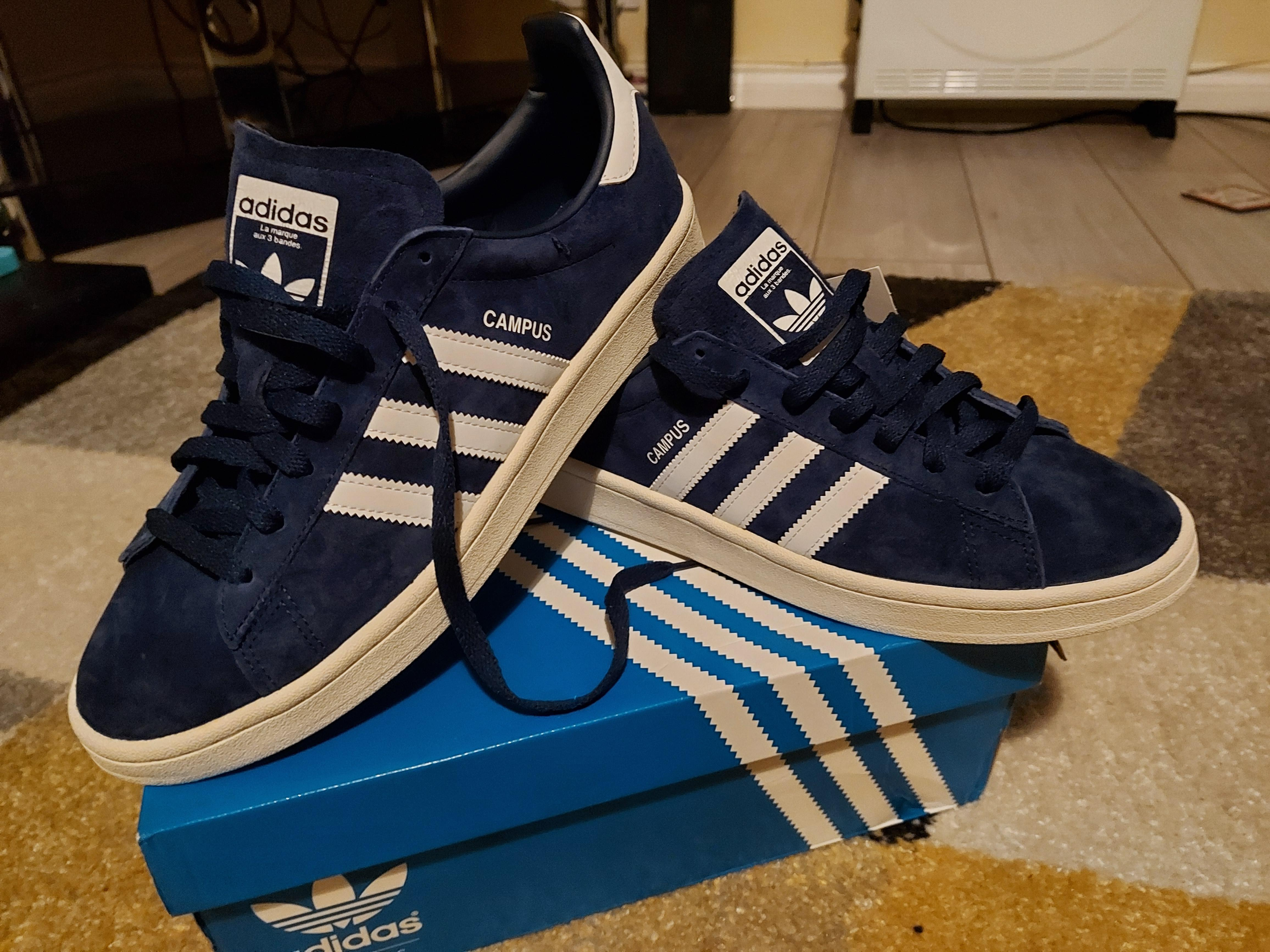
- Adidas Campus 80s in blue
- Type: Sneakers
- Inventor: Adidas
- Inception: 1970s; 55 years ago
- Manufacturer: Adidas
- Available: Yes
- Website: adidas.com

Adidas Campus is an athletic shoe created by Adidas that was released in the 1970s. The shoes were first released as basketball shoes before switching to lifestyle shoes. The unique design of the shoe helped make it popular as a chunkier alternative to Adidas' other sneakers.

== Overview ==
The original name of the shoes were Tournament later being renamed to Campus in the 1980s. Part of what made the shoes a success is the thicker overall design of the shoe when compared to other shoes from Adidas like the Samba or Gazelle. This can be seen from the bigger sole, the bigger upper of the shoe, and even the wider stripes on the sides. This made the shoe a better option for people who prefer comfortability or even a wider shoe for their feet. The shoe also has a more simpler design with the toe box with a plain look rather than a unique design like similar Adidas shoes.

== Models ==
=== Campus 80s ===
The original shoe is officially referred to as Campus 80s and keeps the aesthetics of the original release. This version was reintroduced in the late 2010s.

=== Campus 00s ===
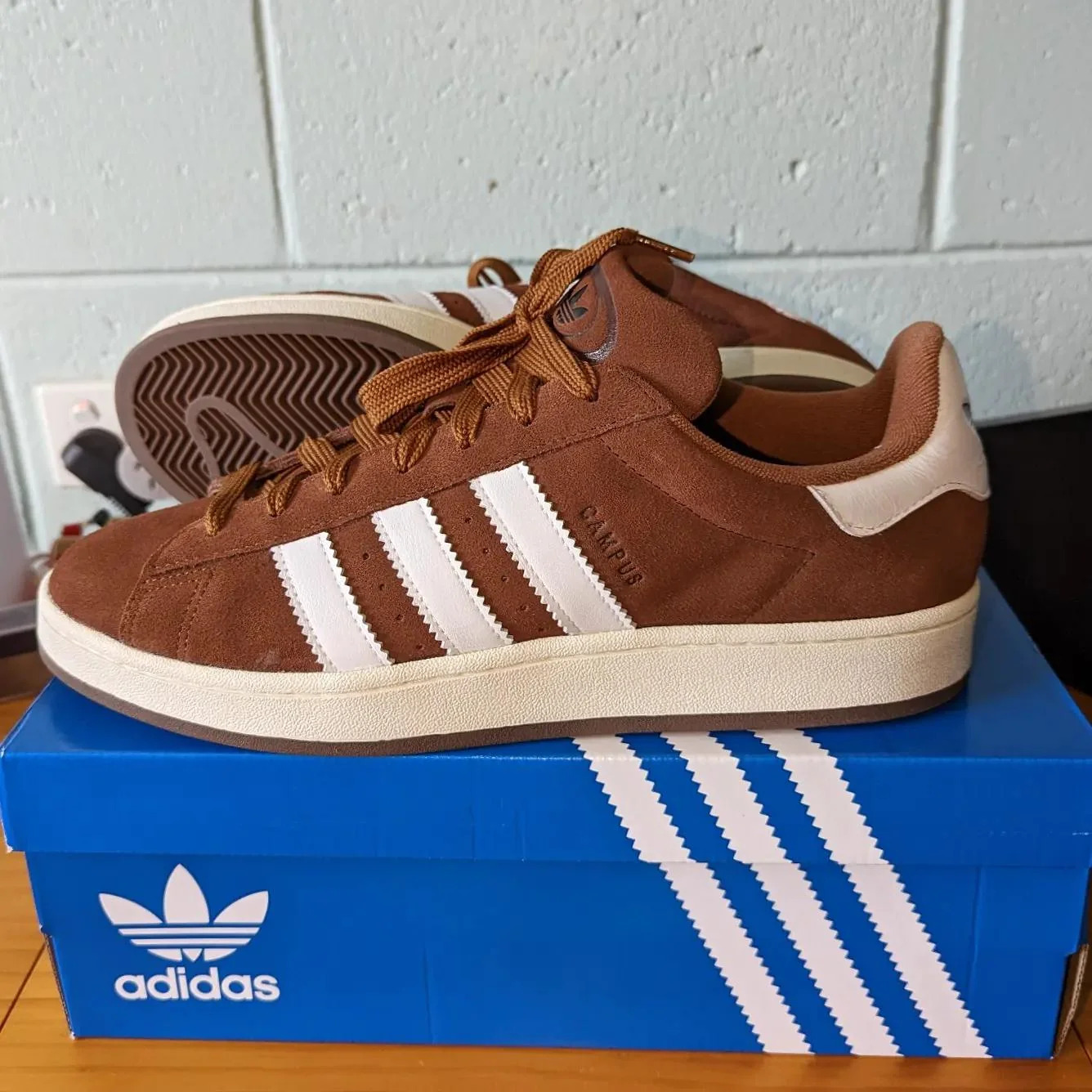
Adidas Campus 00s in brown

In 2022, Adidas released an even chunkier version of the shoe called the Campus 00s. The name being an inspiration to the chunky designs of shoes from the 2000s, specifically lifestyle and skateboarding shoes. This can be seen in the quality of the suede used for the shoe, the bigger sole and upper, the wide laces, and even the wider 3 stripe design.

=== Campus ADV ===
A skate specific version was also released which featured better cushioning, a stronger upper, and reinforced heel to better perform tricks and withstand the wear from skate boarding.

=== Campus Evolution ===
A Evolution version was also released in 2009, featuring a more chunky and brightly colored upper, a thicker tongue and with the stripes and heel notch in fluorescent colors.

== Collaborations ==
Adidas decided to collaborate with Bad Bunny on different designs of some of their shoes with one of them being the "Campus 80s" released in February 25, 2023.

A special project with Korn resulted in the release of special versions of the "Campus 00s" and the "Supermodified" along with apparel in October 27, 2023.

A collaboration with South Park resulted in the release of the "Campus 80s Towelie" featuring a purple terry cloth upper and UV-sensitive eyes on April 20, 2021.
