= Adidas Gazelle =

Line of shoes by Adidas

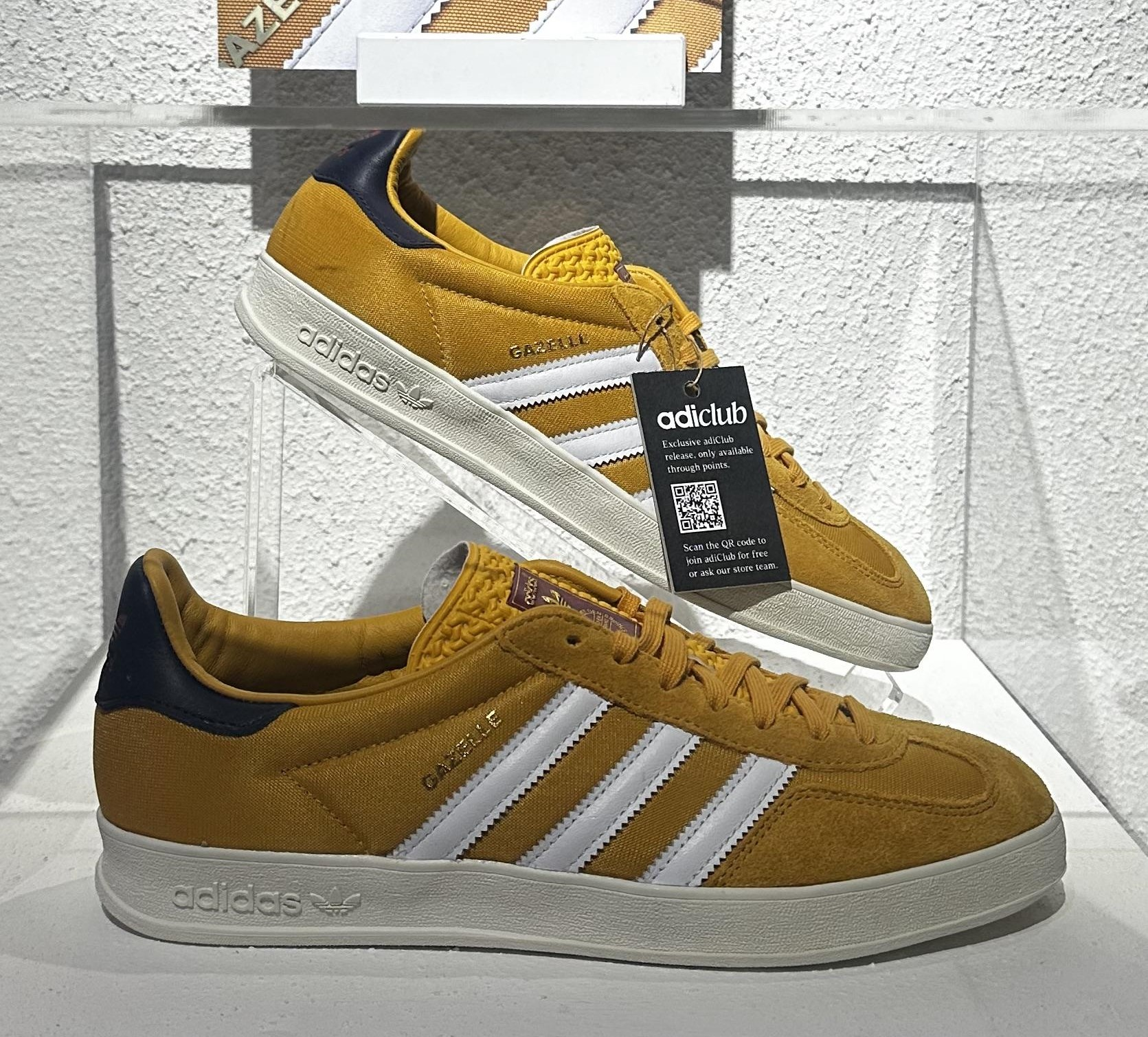
- Type: Sneakers
- Inventor: Adidas
- Inception: 1966; 60 years ago
- Manufacturer: Adidas
- Available: Yes
- Website: adidas.com

Adidas Gazelle is a line of shoes released by Adidas in 1966. The original use of the shoe was for training but then later redesigned to an indoor version for handball.

== Overview ==
The Gazelle is a continuation of a previous shoe that Adidas had created called the Olympiade which was a running shoe. When it first launched, it released in two versions: a red version with similar elements to the Olympiade and mainly aimed to be used in outside settings and a blue version which was aimed for indoor activities. Each one had specific tractions to suit their specific environment as well. The Gazelle also marked the first shoe to be created with suede by Adidas instead of canvas or leather.

In 1979, Adidas decided to go back to their old catalog of shoes and find ways to reinvent them in order to resell them or make them popular again. The Gazelle was one of those shoes which saw its design changed from a general training shoe to one used for handball. The main design feature that set it apart from the previous models was the use of a transparent sole which Adidas' other shoes did not have. Outside of sports, the hip-hop scene in Europe, specifically in Britain with Britpop, helped make the shoe take off as it was an affordable option for many that wanted a stylish shoe less expensive than other offerings.

The shoe has seen a comeback due to various celebrities wearing them and has been re-released as part of the Adidas Originals line.

== Models ==
=== Gazelle Indoor ===
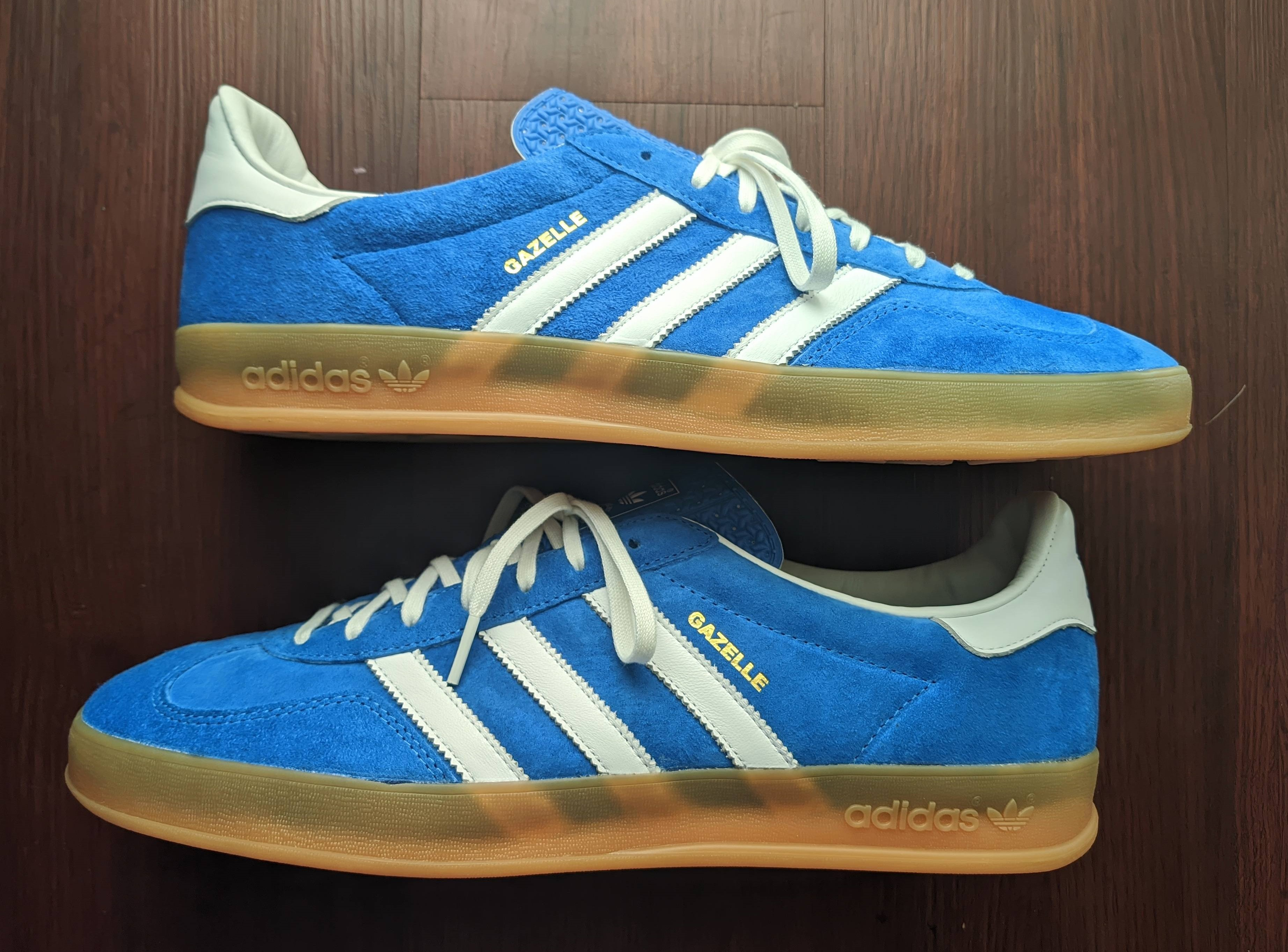
A blue pair of Adidas Gazelle Indoor sneakers

A model based on the original indoor version of the Gazelle. The sole on the shoe is thinner and somewhat transparent allowing visibility of the suede upper. The silhouette is also changed from the design of the modern Gazelle with a longer and less bulky body. The bottom of the shoe features a trefoil pattern design rather than the honeycomb pattern of the normal Gazelle. The Gazelle became a very popular shoe in 2023 because of Harry Styles' fans during his 2023 tour "Love on Tour". They nicknamed them "Satellite Stompers" in reference to the dance Styles' does during his song Satellite.

=== Gazelle Bold ===
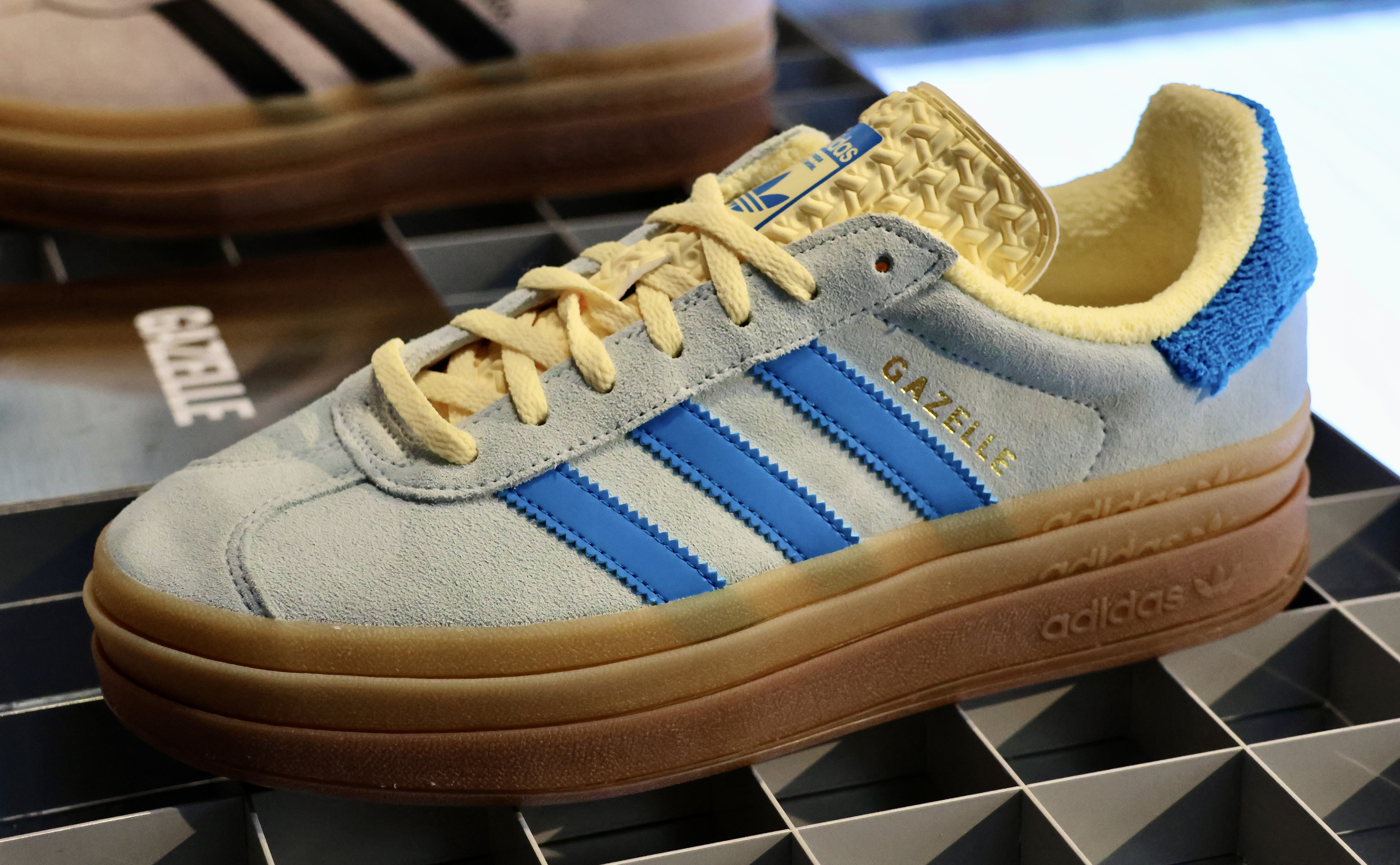
Adidas Gazelle Bold in blue and yellow

Gazelle Bold is a platform variant that originally appeared in 1996 with a design based on the original Gazelle, with the exception of the bottom of the shoe which features a triple-stacked sole from the Gazelle Indoor.

=== Gazelle ADV ===
Gazelle ADV is a skateboarding release of the sneaker that features a higher foxing tape, a double-layered toe cap, and a grippier outsole for better control and durability.
