= No Me Quiero Ir de Aquí =

2025 concert residency by Bad Bunny

- Residency by Bad Bunny
- Poster for the residency
- Location: San Juan, Puerto Rico
- Venue: José Miguel Agrelot Coliseum
- Associated album: Debí Tirar Más Fotos
- Start date: July 11, 2025
- End date: September 20, 2025
- No. of shows: 31

Bad Bunny concert chronology
- Most Wanted Tour (2024); No Me Quiero Ir de Aquí (2025); Debí Tirar Más Fotos World Tour (2025–2026)

No Me Quiero Ir de Aquí (transl. I Don’t Want To Leave Here) was the first concert residency by Puerto Rican rapper and singer Bad Bunny in support of his seventh studio album Debí Tirar Más Fotos (2025). The residency ran from July 11, 2025 until September 20, 2025, and was composed of 31 concert dates held at the José Miguel Agrelot Coliseum in San Juan, the capital municipality of Puerto Rico.

== Background ==
On December 26, 2024, Bad Bunny announced his sixth studio album, Debí Tirar Más Fotos, with a release date for January 5, 2025, the day before Three Kings Day, which is a national holiday in Puerto Rico. In less than a week upon its release, the album was immediately met with critical acclaim from fans and critics for its themes, described as a "love letter" to Puerto Rico, blending traditional Puerto Rican folkloric music genres such as plena, jíbaro, bomba, and salsa music with reggaeton and house music. In the early morning of January 12, 2025, two Monobloc chairs, similar to the ones that appear on the cover of the album, appeared atop of the stairs to the entrance of the José Miguel Agrelot Coliseum in San Juan, Puerto Rico, hinting the possibility of Bad Bunny performing at the venue. The following day, January 13, 2025, the singer released a video formally announcing his first residency to take place at the same venue where he has performed numerous times and broken ticket and attendance records.

No Me Quiero Ir de Aquí translates to "I do not want to leave here," a phrase from the outro of "El Apagón", found on his fifth studio album, Un Verano Sin Ti (2022). This lyric is a reference to the growing number Puerto Ricans relocating to the United States due to high-living costs on the island, gentrification, and the loss of cultural identity. Bad Bunny explores these challenging topics, which create a thematic through-line for both Un Verano Sin Ti and Debí Tirar Más Fotos.

This residency marked the first one being held at the venue and the first time a concert residency was held in Puerto Rico, breaking a record held by Wisin & Yandel that was established after a 14-date run of their farewell tour in the month of December 2022, also at the José Miguel Agrelot Coliseum. The venue's administrator, ASM Global, further confirmed that the residency had been in plans with Bad Bunny's production team for over a year and that the venue had cleared out additional dates to extend the residency throughout September 2025. At the end of the day of the in-person pre-sale on January 15, 2025, nine additional dates were announced, extending the residency throughout September 14, 2025. Later that night, to celebrate the launch of the public pre-sale, Bad Bunny made a surprise pop-up performance at El Boricua, a local college bar in Río Piedras in the vicinity of the University of Puerto Rico, Río Piedras Campus, where he performed songs from his sixth studio album, Debí Tirar Más Fotos, as well as salsa versions of various songs from his discography.

On September 15, 2025, one day after the original 30-date run of the residency ended, Bad Bunny announced a thirty first show, dubbed Una Más (transl. One more), to take place on September 20. This additional date was live-streamed worldwide from the Choliseo through Amazon's Prime Music and Prime Video streaming services, as well as through Twitch, on the eight anniversary of the impact of Hurricane María in Puerto Rico, the most intense, costliest, and deadliest natural disaster to strike the archipelago and island.

=== Economic impact ===
The residency brought substantial financial influx to the local economy. A study by Indira Luciano Montalvo, associate professor of economics at the University of Puerto Rico, Río Piedras Campus, estimated that the residency generated a minimum of $176.6 million in economic activity through production revenue, employment, and audience spending, excluding ticket prices and in-venue expenses; Luciano Montalvo characterized this figure as "very conservative." Discover Puerto Rico, the island's nonprofit destination marketing organization, estimated the residency brought in approximately $200 million in tourist spending on lodging, transportation, and food, while a report from Gaither International estimated $733 million in total gains when accounting for increased international exposure and shifts in global perception of Puerto Rico. The 31 sold-out shows attracted over 500,000 attendees, with the first nine shows reserved exclusively for residents of Puerto Rico. The Puerto Rico Tourism Company reported that hotel occupancy rose 6 percent in July, reaching 85 percent compared to 79 percent the previous year, with projected increases of 10.1 percent in August and 12.2 percent in September. Approximately two million passengers passed through Luis Muñoz Marín International Airport during the residency period, with 40 percent composed of international visitors.

The residency also had a measurable effect on Puerto Rican artists featured on the album. Los Pleneros de la Cresta, who performed at all 31 shows and collaborated with Bad Bunny on "Café con Ron", grew from tens of thousands of monthly Spotify listeners to 12 million; the group used the increased revenue to fund cultural preservation projects through their nonprofit Acción Valerosa, including the restoration of the Yerba Bruja cultural center in Ciales. Local artisans reported a 340 percent increase in the sale of vejigante masks in Ponce, bookstores reported a 280 percent increase in sales of Puerto Rican authors, and local salsa, bomba, and plena artists reported an average income increase of 65 percent during the residency period.

=== Lawsuit ===
On September 17, 2025, three days before the thirty first and final date of the residency, a lawsuit was presented by Ramón Carrasco, an 84-year-old widowed man from Humacao, Puerto Rico, in a court in Puerto Rico for the use of his residence's image in the filming of the short film of the same name as Bad Bunny's album Debí Tirar Más Fotos, as well as recreating the structure in the rapper's residency. The lawsuit alleges that, in November 2024, a location scout for Bad Bunny's company requested permission to visit and study the man's house, and that he was not given details of the production. The short film's production took place from November 27 to December 3, 2024, and the lawsuit alleges Carrasco was not presented with a formal or informal proposal, leaving the man with no idea on how the house would be utilized. The lawsuit also alleges that the man was asked to sign on a blank cell phone screen, though he is illiterate but knows how to sign his name. The document alleges that the defendants took advantage of Carrasco's limited education to deceive him and withhold the contents of two contracts to which his signature was digitally transferred and which were not delivered to him until July 2025. The lawsuit states the man received two check payments in the amounts of $2,400 and $2,800 and alleges that an exact replica of his property was built for the residency, which, according to the document, was built by Carrasco himself in the 1960s.

== Promotion ==
On January 13, 2025, the same day that the residency was announced, Bad Bunny co-hosted The Tonight Show Starring Jimmy Fallon, where he "crashed" Fallon's monologue, joined by Los Pleneros de la Cresta, and also performed "Voy a Llevarte Pa' PR" for the first time. As part of the fiftieth season of Saturday Night Live, Bad Bunny performed "Baile Inolvidable" and "DTMF" with Los Pleneros de la Cresta on February 14, 2025, during SNL50: The Homecoming Concert, at Radio City Music Hall; he also participated in the Lonely Island medley by singing the opening lyrics to "I Just Had Sex" (in vibrato), originally sung by Akon. Two days later, on February 16, 2025, while not a musical guest, he made an appearance on the Saturday Night Live 50th Anniversary Special in the "Domingo: Vow Renewal" sketch, playing Santiago, the hot brother of Domingo (Marcello Hernández) and Renaldo (Pedro Pascal), and later in the "Q&A Segment" hosted by Tina Fey and Amy Poehler. Bad Bunny also appeared as the musical guest on May 17, 2025, during the show's season finale, where he performed "Nuevayol" and "Perfumito Nuevo", the latter with RaiNao.

== Venue ==
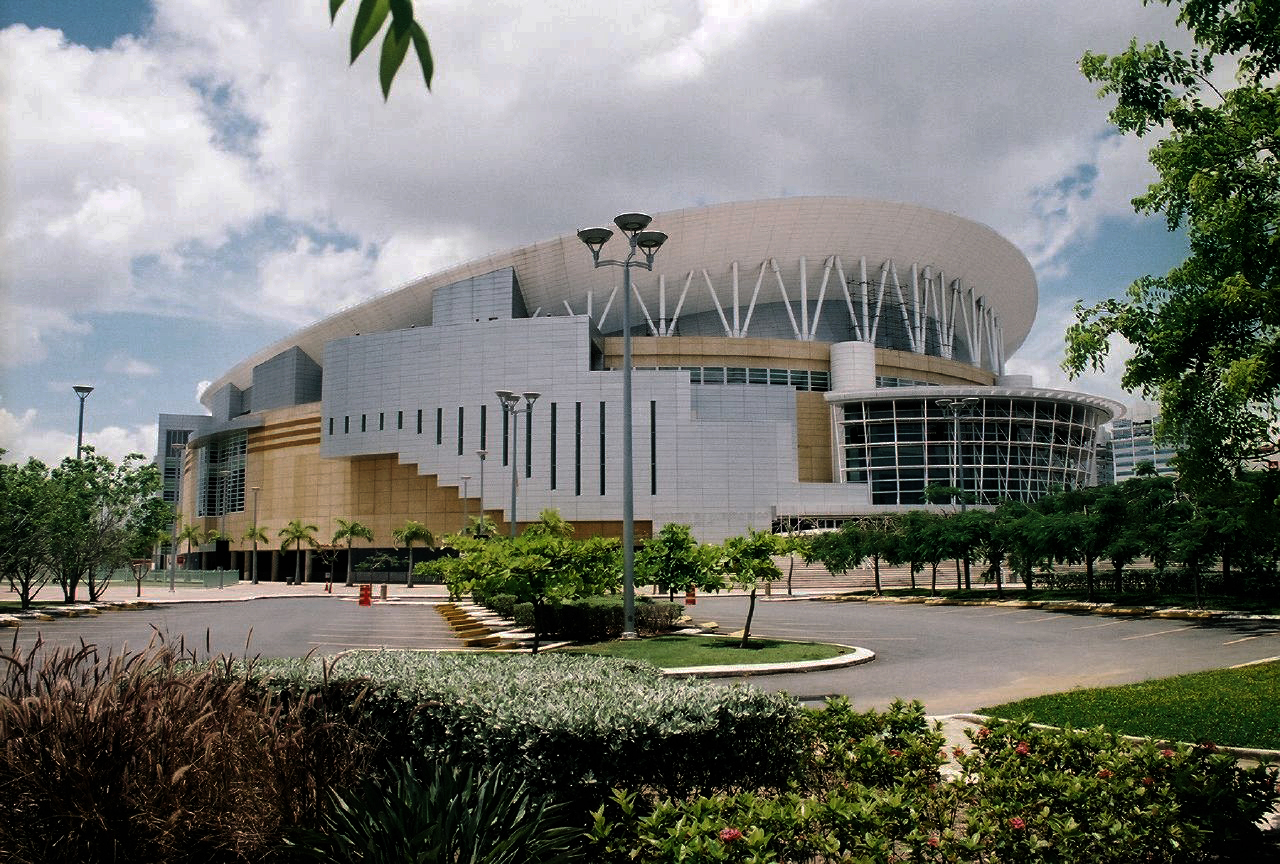
The José Miguel Agrelot Coliseum, the venue where Bad Bunny's concert residency took place.

The concert residency took place at the José Miguel Agrelot Coliseum, located nearby the Milla de Oro financial district of Hato Rey in San Juan, Puerto Rico. Named after Puerto Rican comedian José Miguel Agrelot, the venue is colloquially nicknamed El Choliseo (and the shortened El Choli), a portmanteau of the words coliseo ('coliseum' in Spanish) and Cholito, referring to Don Cholito, one of Agrelot's characters and his own adopted nickname. It is the largest entertainment and sports indoor venue in the insular Caribbean, with a capacity of 18,500 spectators, having hosted over one thousand events and over ten million visitors since opening in September 2004.

Bad Bunny has held many attendance and sales records at the venue. His 2019 Choliseo headliner debut broke an attendance record, previously held by Metallica nearly nine years prior, with 18,000 spectators in an arena stage concert setup. He broke this record again in July 2022 with an all-time attendance record of 18,749 spectators, exceeding 249 spectators over the venue's capacity on the first night of his three-date performances. In 2023, the venue hosted WWE SmackDown and Backlash 2023, back-to-back, where he made his Puerto Rico debut as a professional wrestler at both events. On October 12, 2023 the venue hosted its first ever listening party for the singer's fifth studio album, Nadie Sabe Lo Que Va a Pasar Mañana (2023), released the following day. Prior to the beginning of his residency, Bad Bunny's last performance at the Choliseo was the culmination of his Most Wanted Tour, June 7–9, 2024, which supported his fifth studio album.

== Stages ==
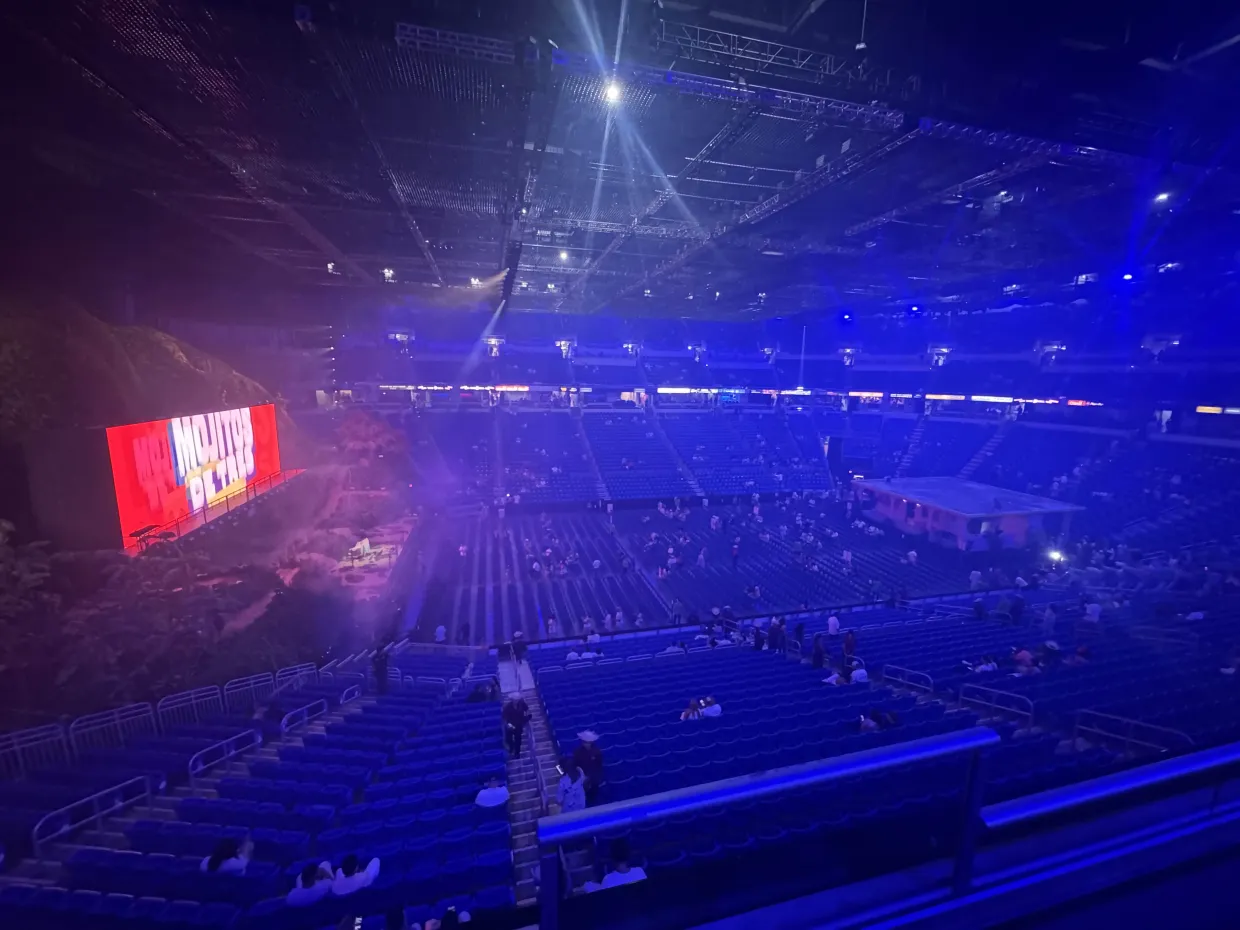
Panorama of the residency's stages inside the Choliseo. On the left, the mogote stage, while the casita b-stage faced on the opposite side of the venue.

The residency featured two stages, both set up on opposite sides of the venue. The main large-scale stage, which was used for the first and third act of the show, was located at the north side of the arena and modeled after a mogote, a symbol of the jíbaros, representing the image of the Puerto Rican farmer of the 18th-to-early-19th century. Grass, chickens, goats, plantain trees, and a flamboyán tree, adorned the rest of the stage, resembling the jíbaro's life and farming culture. The upper level of the stage resembled a giant LED billboard, where visuals were transmitted, also doubling with an elevated walkway integrated in front of the screen for additional performances, notably "Weltita", featuring Chuwi.

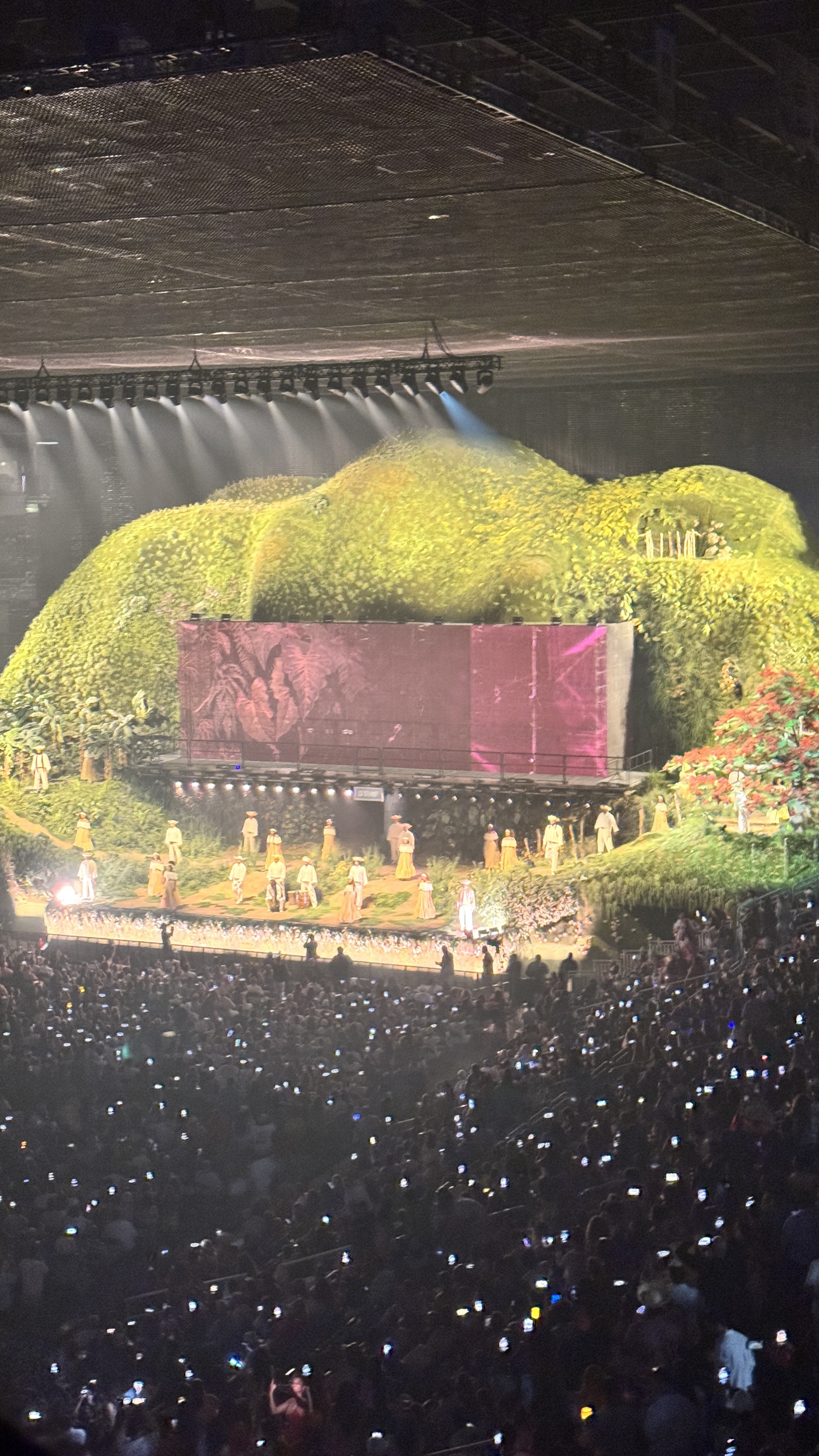
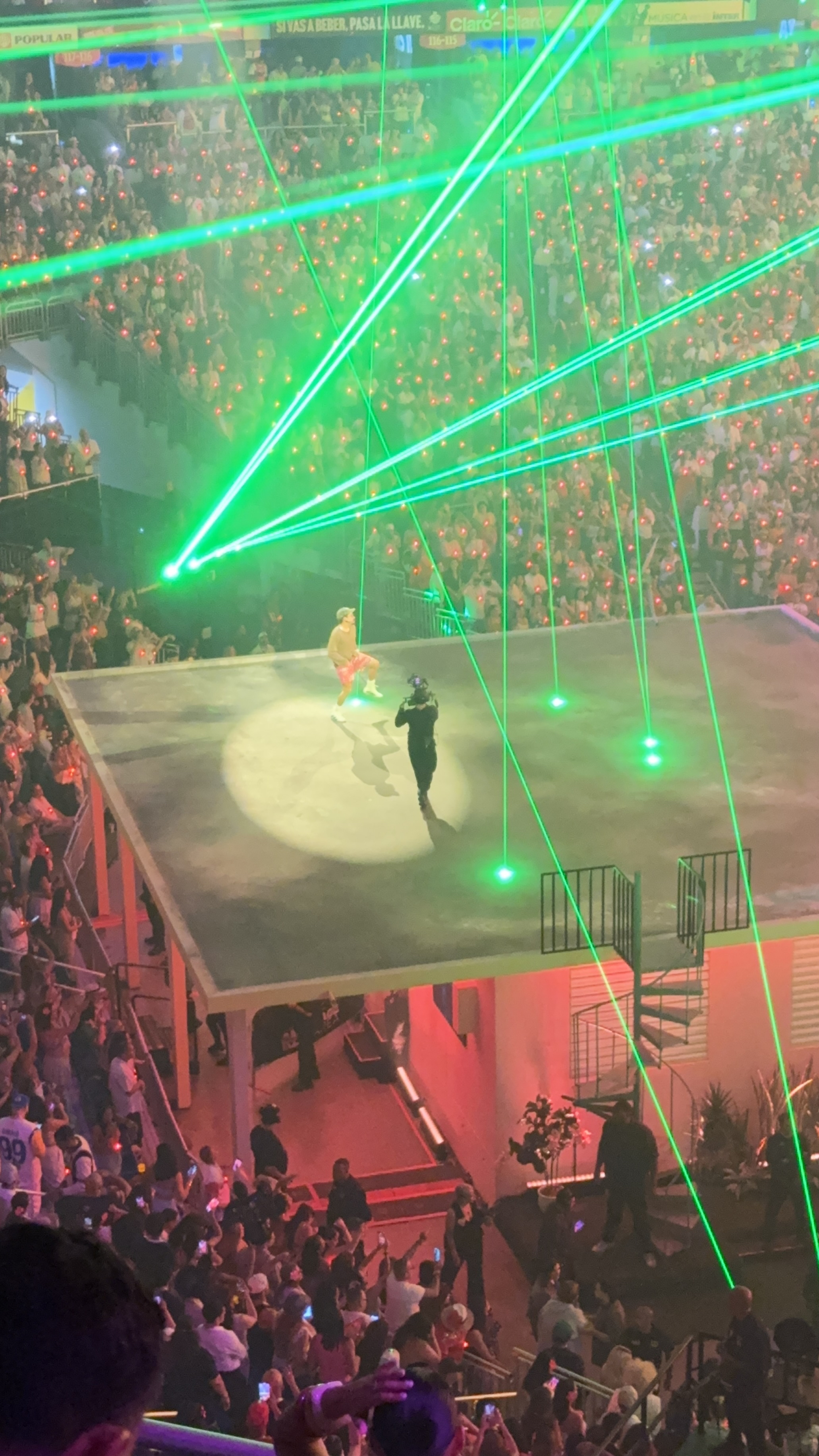
The opening of Act I of the residency, taking place at the mogote stage (top), while Bad Bunny performs atop the casita b-stage (bottom).

The second but smaller b-stage, situated on the South side of the arena, across from the mogote, was modeled after a common rural Puerto Rican house, commonly constructed from concrete, concrete bricks and galvanized steel, resembling the house featured in the short film of the same name as the album Debí Tirar Más Fotos. Reggaetón performances took place at this stage, popularly nicknamed la casita (transl. the little house), during the second act of the show in the "front porch" of the house, in the style of a party de marquesina (transl. garage party or carport party), where the reggaetón genre was developed. Performances also took place on the roof of the structure, complete with an elevator stage and a spiral staircase from the ground to the roof. The stage doubled as a fully functioning indoor structure, complete with furniture, televisions and a bar. The structure also served as the VIP area for attendees, personally invited by Bad Bunny, which have included LeBron James, Ricky Martin, J. J. Barea, Kylian Mbappé, Luis Guzmán, Tito Trinidad, Benicio del Toro, Adriana Díaz, Marcello Hernández, John Hamm, Austin Butler, Darren Aranofsky, among many more.

The mogote stage was constructed in sections, and in complete secrecy inside tension fabric buildings erected on the grounds that was previously occupied by the now-demolished Río Piedras State Penitentiary, located about four miles South from the Choliseo. The house was constructed over the course of four months, after various changes, right up until the final assembly inside the arena, before the residency began. It was transported in three sections to the venue between three flatbed trailers.

== Ticket sales ==
On the day the residency was announced, details regarding ticket sales were made public online. The nine concert dates slated for the month of July 2025 were reserved for an exclusive in-person first come first serve distribution on January 15, 2025 throughout nine public locations around Puerto Rico for residents only. VIP and hotel packages for concert dates for August through September 2025 were released online the same day, each one partnering with different hotels in high tourist areas such as Miramar, Condado and Isla Verde.

The general sale for the residency took place online on January 17, 2025, selling out over 400,000 tickets across all 30 dates in four hours. Much like the first nine shows of the residency, tickets for the thirty first show, on September 20, 2025, were reserved exclusively for residents of Puerto Rico who registered for it and immediately sold out.

== Set list ==
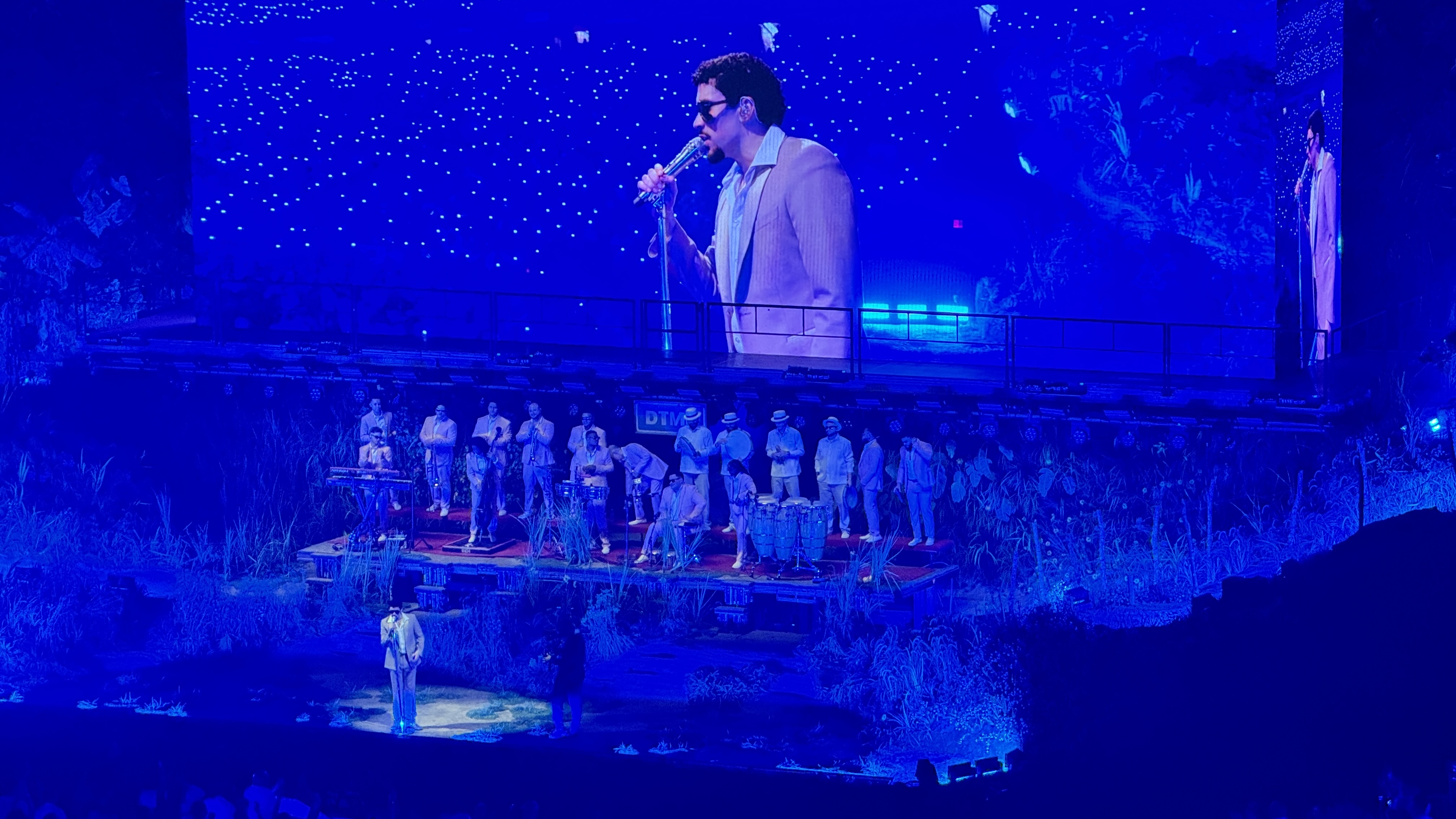
Bad Bunny performing "Baile Inolvidable".

The show's set list was divided in three acts and varied for every concert in the residency; this set list is from the first concert, held on July 11, 2025. The residency kicked off with a new single, titled "Alambre Púa"(transl. Barbed wire), which was released on July 14, 2025, after the third day of the residency. At every concert, Chuwi and Los Pleneros de la Cresta joined Bad Bunny for "Weltita" and "Café con Ron", respectively. Joining him on the main stage for the third and final act of the residency, Bad Bunny formed Los Sobrinos (transl. The nephews), a backing band composed of young musicians under the age of 25, some of whom were students and alumni from the Escuela Libre de Música in San Juan; Los Pleneros de la Cresta later joined Los Sobrinos on the main stage to serve as backup vocalists. Actor and filmmaker Jacobo Morales appeared in pre-recorded videos alongside Concho, an anthropomorphic Puerto Rican crested toad and mascot of the album Debí Tirar Más Fotos, before segueing to "Weltita", the beginning of the second act and the beginning of the third act.

Act I (main stage)

1. "Alambre Púa"
2. "Ketu Tecré"
3. "El Clúb"
4. "La Santa" (Bomba version)
5. "Pitorro de Coco"
6. Plena interlude/"El Apagón"
7. "Weltita" (with Chuwi)
8. "Kloufrens"
9. "Bokete"
10. Acoustic set
  1. "Si Estuviésemos Juntos"
  2. "Ni Bien Ni Mal"
  3. "Amorfoda"
  4. "Turista"

Act II (casita stage)

11. Extraño a Puerto Rico interlude
12. "Nuevayol"
13. "Tití Me Preguntó"
14. "Neverita"
15. "Si Veo a Tu Mamá" (House version)
16. "La Romana" (House version)
17. "La Jumpa"
18. "Voy a Llevarte Pa' PR"
19. "Me Porto Bonito"
20. "No Me Conoce"
21. "Soltera"
22. "Perro Negro"
23. "Yo Perreo Sola"
24. "Efecto"
25. "Safaera"
26. "Veldá"
27. "Eoo"
28. "Café con Ron" (with Los Pleneros de la Cresta)
29. "Ábreme Paso" (Los Pleneros de la Cresta)

Act III (main stage)

30. "Lo Que Le Pasó a Hawaii" (Note: Every Sunday date of the residency, "Lo Que Le Pasó a Hawaii" was performed by a guest artist, in place of Bad Bunny.)
31. Los Sobrinos interlude
32. "Callaíta" (Salsa version)
33. "Baile Inolvidable"
34. "DTMF"
35. "La Mudanza"
Guest artists
- During the July 12, 2025 concert, RaiNao joined to perform "Perfumito Nuevo", while Jhayco joined to perform "Tarot", "Dakiti" "Cómo Se Siente", and "No Me Conoce".
- During the July 13, 2025 concert, Jowell & Randy joined to perform "Safaera". Jowell & Randy later took over the casita stage to perform "El Funeral de la Canoa", "Hey Mister", "Guayeteo", "Salgo Pa' La Calle", and "Siente el Boom", while Pedro Capó performed "Lo Que Le Pasó a Hawaii" in place of Bad Bunny.
- During the July 18, 2025 concert, Eladio Carrión joined to perform "Thunder y Lightning", "Kemba Walker", and "Coco Chanel".
- During the July 19, 2025 concert, RaiNao joined to perform "Perfumito Nuevo", while Mora joined to perform "Una Vez".
- During the July 20, 2025 concert, Wisin joined to perform "Veldá"; he later took over the casita stage to perform "Saoco", "El Gistro Amarillo", "Pam Pam", and "Sácala", while Ednita Nazario performed "Lo Que Le Pasó a Hawaii" in place of Bad Bunny.
- During the July 25, 2025 concert, Young Miko joined to perform "Fina", while Gilberto Santa Rosa joined to perform "Baile Inolvidable" and "La Agarro Bajando".
- During the July 26, 2025 concert, RaiNao joined to perform "Perfumito Nuevo", while Alfonso Vélez joined Los Pleneros de la Cresta to perform "El Fuá (La Luz)" and "El Jolgorio (Wepa)".
- During the July 27, 2025 concert, Tito El Bambino joined to perform "Eoo", "Siente el Boom", and "Baila Morena", Tainy performed "120", "Lo Siento BB:/", and "Mojabi Ghost", and Farruko performed "Lo Que Le Pasó a Hawaii" in place of Bad Bunny.
- During the August 1, 2025 concert, RaiNao joined to perform "Perfumito Nuevo", while Arcángel joined to perform "Tú No Vive Así" and "La Jumpa".
- During the August 2, 2025 concert, Yandel joined to perform "El Teléfono".
- During the August 3, 2025 concert, Sech joined to perform "Ignorantes", "Otro Trago", "911", and "Sal y Perrea", while Willy Rodríguez, lead singer of Cultura Profética, performed "Lo Que Le Pasó a Hawaii" in place of Bad Bunny.
- During the August 8, 2025 concert, Omar Courtz and Dei V joined to perform "Veldá"; the latter took over the casita stage to perform "Narcotics" and "Quién es Dei V?".
- During the August 9, 2025 concert, RaiNao joined to perform "Perfumito Nuevo", while Omar Courtz and Dei V joined to perform "Veldá" with Courtz also singing "Luces de Colors".
- During the August 10, 2025 concert, Residente joined to perform "Atrévete-te-te" and "Chulin Culin Chunfly" (originally performed by Julio Voltio), Mora joined to perform "Una Vez", and Kany García performed "Lo Que Le Pasó a Hawaii" in place of Bad Bunny.
- During the August 15, 2025 concert, RaiNao joined to perform "Perfumito Nuevo", while Ñengo Flow joined to perform "Que Malo" and "Safaera".
- During the August 16, 2025 concert, De la Ghetto joined to perform "Sensación del Bloque".
- During the August 17, 2025 concert, Jowell & Randy joined to perform "Safaera" and "Siente El Boom", while Ile performed "Lo Que Le Pasó a Hawaii" in place of Bad Bunny.
- During the August 22, 2025 concert, Ivy Queen joined to perform "Que Lloren", "Quítate Tú Pa' Ponerme Yo", "Noche de Entierro (Nuestro Amor)", "Quiero Saber" and "Quiero Bailar".
- During the August 23, 2025 concert, Feid joined to perform "Perro Negro", "Classy 101", "Normal", and "Feliz Cumpleaños Ferxxo".
- During the August 24, 2025 concert, Nicky Jam joined to perform "Yo No Soy Tu Marido", "El Perdón", "La Combi Completa" and "Cómo Te Llamas Tú", while Tito Auger performed "Lo Que Le Pasó a Hawaii" in place of Bad Bunny.
- During the August 29, 2025 concert, El Alfa joined to perform "Dema Ga Ge Gi Go Gu".
- During the August 30, 2025 concert, Jhayco joined to perform "Dakiti" and "Tarot", while Rubén Blades joined to perform "Baile Inolvidable" and "Amor y Control".
- During the August 31, 2025 concert, Ozuna joined to perform "Déjate Llevar", later taking over the casita stage to perform "Dile Que Tú Me Quieres", "Si Tu Marido No Te Quiere", "Se Preparó", "Adicto", "Hey Mor", "El Farsante", and "Te Boté (Remix)", while Luis Fonsi performed "Lo Que Le Pasó a Hawaii" in place of Bad Bunny.
- During the September 5, 2025 concert, DJ Luian and Mambo Kingz joined to perform "Diles" and "Pa Ti", while Arcángel joined to perform "Me Acostumbré" and "Tú No Vive Así".
- During the September 6, 2025 concert, Jay Wheeler joined to perform "Si Estuviésemos Juntos", "Solo De Mí", "La Curiosidad", and "Turista", while Vico C joined to perform "Viernes 13", "Xplosión" and "Bomba Para Afincar".
- During the September 7, 2025 concert, Rauw Alejandro joined to perform "Party" and "Qué Pasaría...", later taking over the casita stage to perform "Diluvio", "Punto 40", "Lokera", and "Buenos Términos", while Lorén Aldarondo, lead singer of Chuwi, performed "Lo Que Le Pasó a Hawaii" in place of Bad Bunny.
- During the September 12, 2025 concert, Zion & Lennox joined to perform "Pierdo La Cabeza" and "Otra Vez", while Omar Courtz and Dei V joined to perform "Veldá".
- During the September 13, 2025 concert, The Marias joined to perform "Otro Atardecer" and "Turista", while Chencho Corleone joined to perform "Candy", "Fanática Sensual", "Guatauba" and "Me Porto Bonito".
- During the September 14, 2025 concert, Omar Courtz and Dei V joined to perform "Veldá", while Andrés Jiménez performed "Lo Que Le Pasó a Hawaii" in place of Bad Bunny.
- During the September 20, 2025 concert, RaiNao joined to perform "Perfumito Nuevo" and Dei V joined to perform "Veldá", while Jowell & Randy and Ñengo Flow joined to perform "Safaera". Jowell & Randy later took over the casita stage to perform "El Funeral de la Canoa", "Hey Mister", "Guayeteo", "Salgo Pa' La Calle", and "Siente el Boom". Arcángel, De la Ghetto and Ñengo Flow joined to perform "Acho PR", while Marc Anthony joined to perform "Preciosa".

== Shows ==
List of concerts, showing date, city, country, venue, attendance (tickets sold / total available), and gross revenue
Date (2025)	City	Country	Venue	Attendance	Revenue
July 11	San Juan	Puerto Rico	José Miguel Agrelot Coliseum	—N/a	—N/a
July 12	San Juan	Puerto Rico	José Miguel Agrelot Coliseum	—N/a	—N/a
July 13	San Juan	Puerto Rico	José Miguel Agrelot Coliseum	—N/a	—N/a
July 18	San Juan	Puerto Rico	José Miguel Agrelot Coliseum	—N/a	—N/a
July 19	San Juan	Puerto Rico	José Miguel Agrelot Coliseum	—N/a	—N/a
July 20	San Juan	Puerto Rico	José Miguel Agrelot Coliseum	—N/a	—N/a
July 25	San Juan	Puerto Rico	José Miguel Agrelot Coliseum	—N/a	—N/a
July 26	San Juan	Puerto Rico	José Miguel Agrelot Coliseum	—N/a	—N/a
July 27	San Juan	Puerto Rico	José Miguel Agrelot Coliseum	—N/a	—N/a
August 1	San Juan	Puerto Rico	José Miguel Agrelot Coliseum	—N/a	—N/a
August 2	San Juan	Puerto Rico	José Miguel Agrelot Coliseum	—N/a	—N/a
August 3	San Juan	Puerto Rico	José Miguel Agrelot Coliseum	—N/a	—N/a
August 8	San Juan	Puerto Rico	José Miguel Agrelot Coliseum	—N/a	—N/a
August 9	San Juan	Puerto Rico	José Miguel Agrelot Coliseum	—N/a	—N/a
August 10	San Juan	Puerto Rico	José Miguel Agrelot Coliseum	—N/a	—N/a
August 15	San Juan	Puerto Rico	José Miguel Agrelot Coliseum	—N/a	—N/a
August 16	San Juan	Puerto Rico	José Miguel Agrelot Coliseum	—N/a	—N/a
August 17	San Juan	Puerto Rico	José Miguel Agrelot Coliseum	—N/a	—N/a
August 22	San Juan	Puerto Rico	José Miguel Agrelot Coliseum	—N/a	—N/a
August 23	San Juan	Puerto Rico	José Miguel Agrelot Coliseum	—N/a	—N/a
August 24	San Juan	Puerto Rico	José Miguel Agrelot Coliseum	—N/a	—N/a
August 29	San Juan	Puerto Rico	José Miguel Agrelot Coliseum	—N/a	—N/a
August 30	San Juan	Puerto Rico	José Miguel Agrelot Coliseum	—N/a	—N/a
August 31	San Juan	Puerto Rico	José Miguel Agrelot Coliseum	—N/a	—N/a
September 5	San Juan	Puerto Rico	José Miguel Agrelot Coliseum	—N/a	—N/a
September 6	San Juan	Puerto Rico	José Miguel Agrelot Coliseum	—N/a	—N/a
September 7	San Juan	Puerto Rico	José Miguel Agrelot Coliseum	—N/a	—N/a
September 12	San Juan	Puerto Rico	José Miguel Agrelot Coliseum	—N/a	—N/a
September 13	San Juan	Puerto Rico	José Miguel Agrelot Coliseum	—N/a	—N/a
September 14	San Juan	Puerto Rico	José Miguel Agrelot Coliseum	—N/a	—N/a
September 20	San Juan	Puerto Rico	José Miguel Agrelot Coliseum	—N/a	—N/a
Total				—N/a	—N/a
