= List of Billboard Latin Rhythm Albums number ones of 2026 =

The Latin Rhythm Albums chart is a music chart published in Billboard magazine. The data is compiled by Nielsen SoundScan from a sample that includes music stores, music departments at electronics and department stores, internet sales (both physical and digital) and verifiable sales from concert venues in the United States. The chart is composed of studio, live, and compilation releases by Latin artists performing in the Latin hip hop, urban, dance and reggaeton, the most popular Latin Rhythm music genres.

== Albums ==
Chart date	Album	Artist	Reference
January 3	Debí Tirar Más Fotos	Bad Bunny	
January 10	Debí Tirar Más Fotos	Bad Bunny	
January 17	Debí Tirar Más Fotos	Bad Bunny	
January 24	Debí Tirar Más Fotos	Bad Bunny	
January 31	Debí Tirar Más Fotos	Bad Bunny	
February 7	Debí Tirar Más Fotos	Bad Bunny	
February 14	Debí Tirar Más Fotos	Bad Bunny	
February 21	Debí Tirar Más Fotos	Bad Bunny	
February 28	Debí Tirar Más Fotos	Bad Bunny	
March 7	Debí Tirar Más Fotos	Bad Bunny	
March 14	Debí Tirar Más Fotos	Bad Bunny	
March 21	Debí Tirar Más Fotos	Bad Bunny	
March 28	Debí Tirar Más Fotos	Bad Bunny	
April 4	Debí Tirar Más Fotos	Bad Bunny	
April 11	Debí Tirar Más Fotos	Bad Bunny	
April 18	Debí Tirar Más Fotos	Bad Bunny	
April 25	Debí Tirar Más Fotos	Bad Bunny	
May 2	Debí Tirar Más Fotos	Bad Bunny	
May 9	Debí Tirar Más Fotos	Bad Bunny	
May 16	Debí Tirar Más Fotos	Bad Bunny	
May 23	Debí Tirar Más Fotos	Bad Bunny	
May 30	Debí Tirar Más Fotos	Bad Bunny	
June 6	Debí Tirar Más Fotos	Bad Bunny	
June 13	Debí Tirar Más Fotos	Bad Bunny	
June 20	Debí Tirar Más Fotos	Bad Bunny	
June 27	Debí Tirar Más Fotos	Bad Bunny	
July 4	Debí Tirar Más Fotos	Bad Bunny	
July 11	Debí Tirar Más Fotos	Bad Bunny	
July 18	Debí Tirar Más Fotos	Bad Bunny	
July 25	Debí Tirar Más Fotos	Bad Bunny	
August 1	Debí Tirar Más Fotos	Bad Bunny	
August 8	Debí Tirar Más Fotos	Bad Bunny	
August 15	Debí Tirar Más Fotos	Bad Bunny	
August 22	Debí Tirar Más Fotos	Bad Bunny	
August 29	Debí Tirar Más Fotos	Bad Bunny	
September 5	Debí Tirar Más Fotos	Bad Bunny	
September 12	Debí Tirar Más Fotos	Bad Bunny	
September 19	Debí Tirar Más Fotos	Bad Bunny	
September 26	Debí Tirar Más Fotos	Bad Bunny	
October 3	Debí Tirar Más Fotos	Bad Bunny	
October 10	Debí Tirar Más Fotos	Bad Bunny	
October 17	Debí Tirar Más Fotos	Bad Bunny	
October 24	Debí Tirar Más Fotos	Bad Bunny	
October 31	Debí Tirar Más Fotos	Bad Bunny	
November 7	Debí Tirar Más Fotos	Bad Bunny	
November 14	Debí Tirar Más Fotos	Bad Bunny	
November 21	Debí Tirar Más Fotos	Bad Bunny	
