= Pava (Puerto Rico) =

Associated with the Puerto Rican jíbaro and with the Popular Democratic Party

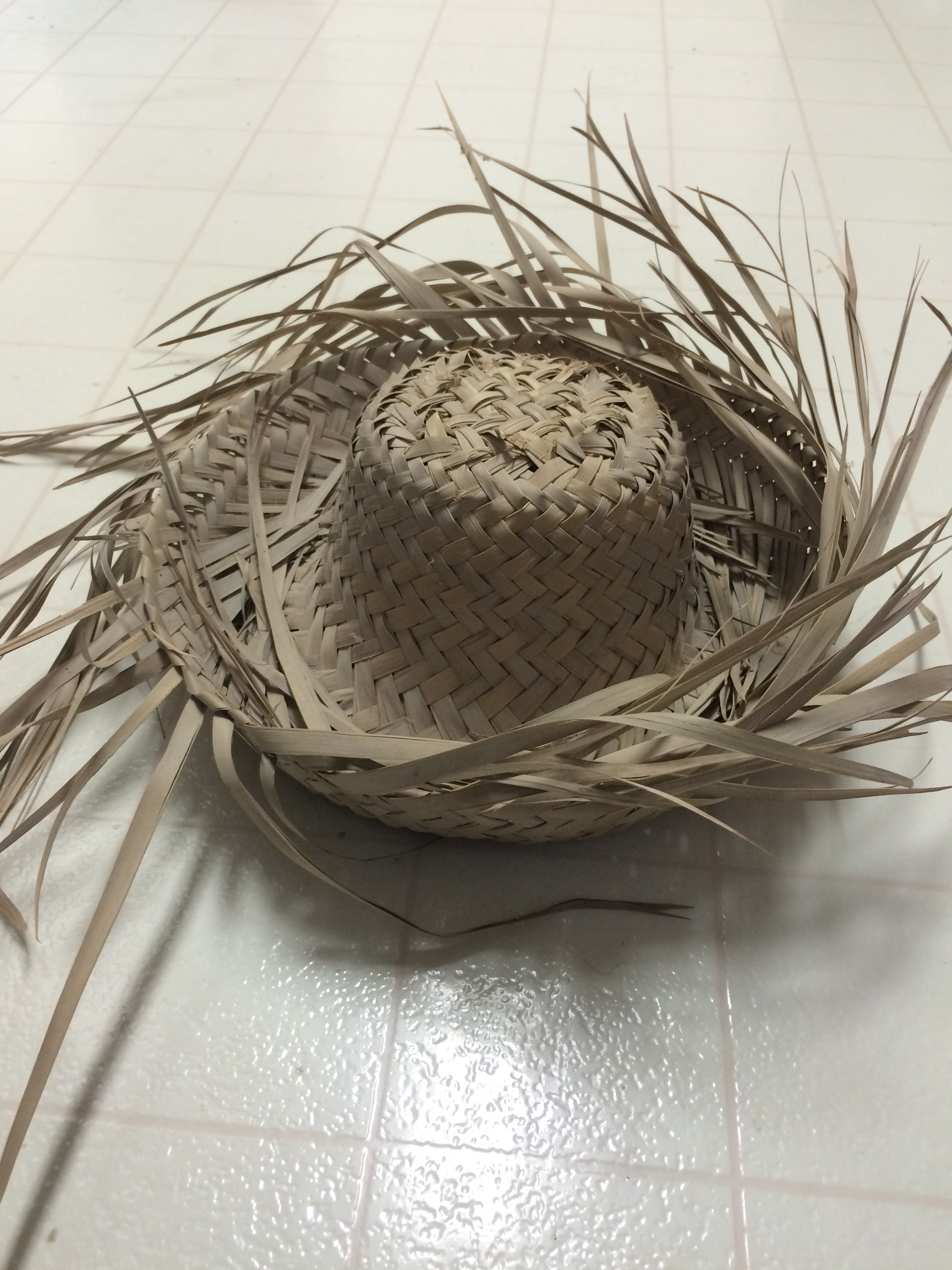
A Puerto Rican pava

A pava is a straw hat hand-woven made out of the leaves of Palm tree. It originated in the fields on Puerto Rico, during the colonial period, it was used by the agricultural workers, particularly sugar cane cutters, coffee pickers and other workers to protect them from the sun.

== Cultural significance ==
The pava hat is worn by farmers and jíbaros (country folk). Children and adults wear the pava when they dress up like a jíbaro.

Bad Bunny wears a pava hat in his Debí Tirar Más Fotos promotional material and for his No Me Quiero Ir de Aquí 2025 concerts in Puerto Rico.

== Gallery ==
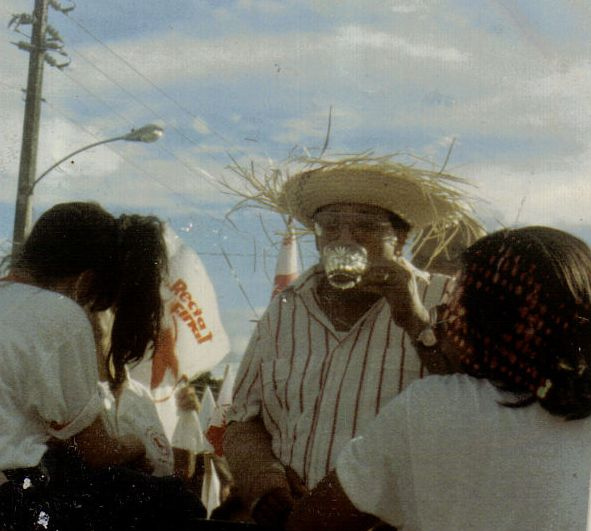
The late Ángel O. Berríos drinking coffee and wearing his pava during a political campaign

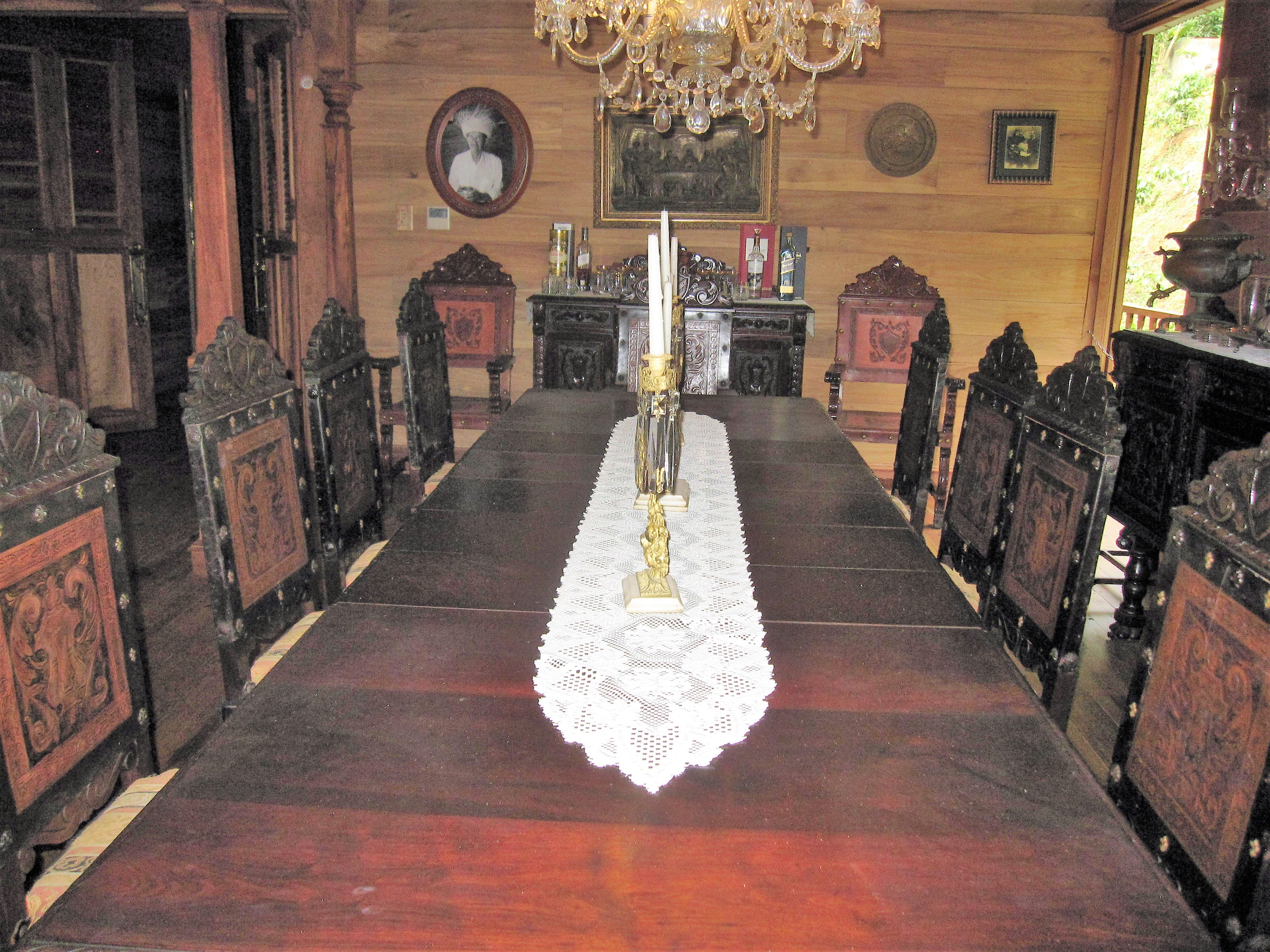
black and white photo at Hacienda Lealtad features a jíbaro wearing a pava

== See also ==
- Panama hat
- List of hat styles
