= Debí Tirar Más Fotos =

Studio album by Bad Bunny
- Released: January 5, 2025
- Recorded: 2023–2025
- Genres: Alternative reggaeton; plena; jíbaro; salsa; bomba; reggaeton; house; dembow
- Length: 62:01
- Language: Spanish
- Label: Rimas
- Producers: Jonathan "Yoni" Asperil; Bassy; Big Jay; Eduardo Cabra; the Change; Mick Coogan; Aidan Cullen; De la Cruz; Digital Jet; Scotty Dittrich; Don Oskar; Dysbit; Elikai; Evrgrn; Foreign Teck; Julito Gastón; Hydra Hitz; Luis Irizarry; KarBeats; Frank King; Julia Lewis; Richie López; Mag; Mvsis; the Osakis; La Paciencia; Saox; Smash David; Tyler Spry; Tainy; Uv Killin Em

Bad Bunny chronology
| Nadie Sabe Lo Que Va a Pasar Mañana (2023) | Debí Tirar Más Fotos (2025) |

Singles from Debí Tirar Más Fotos
- 1. "El Clúb" Released: December 5, 2024; 2. "Pitorro de Coco" Released: December 26, 2024; 3. "Baile Inolvidable" Released: January 9, 2025; 4. "DTMF" Released: January 23, 2025; 5. "Eoo" Released: April 22, 2025

Debí Tirar Más Fotos (Spanish: [deˈβi tiˈɾaɾ mas ˈfotos]; transl. I Should Have Taken More Photos, stylized as DeBÍ TiRAR MáS FOToS and shortened to DTmF) is the sixth solo studio album (seventh overall) by the Puerto Rican rapper and singer Bad Bunny. It was released on January 5, 2025, through Rimas Entertainment and follows his previous record Nadie Sabe Lo Que Va a Pasar Mañana (2023). It features collaborations with Chuwi, Omar Courtz, Los Pleneros de la Cresta, Dei V, and RaiNao.

An alternative reggaeton record, the album heavily blends together diverse elements of traditional Puerto Rican music that Bad Bunny listened to when growing up, including plena, jíbaro, salsa, and bomba, as well as influences of other musical styles, similar to Un Verano Sin Ti (2022). While most of the lyrical content is based on love, heartbreak, partying, and family, some of the lyrics focus on the complexities arising from Puerto Rico's political status as an unincorporated territory under U.S. sovereignty, including gentrification and loss of cultural identity.

Debí Tirar Más Fotos was supported by several singles, including the Billboard Global 200 and Billboard Hot 100 number-one hit "DTMF". It was also promoted with an accompanying short film of the same name uploaded onto YouTube. Following its release, the album received critical acclaim from music critics, who considered it Bad Bunny’s most personal album and an homage to Puerto Rico. The album peaked at number one on the U.S. Billboard 200, becoming his fourth consecutive number-one album to top the chart. From July to September 2025, he hosted the concert residency No Me Quiero Ir de Aquí in Puerto Rico in support of the album, and performed multiple songs from the album during the Super Bowl LX halftime show. He embarked on the all-stadium Debí Tirar Más Fotos World Tour, which started in November 2025 and concluded in August 2026.

Debí Tirar Más Fotos achieved various notable accolades and milestones. It received twelve nominations at the 26th Latin Grammy Awards, where it won five awards, including Best Urban Music Album and Album of the Year, marking Bad Bunny’s first win in the latter category after four nominations. At the 68th Grammy Awards, the album received six nominations, including Album of the Year as well as Record of the Year and Song of the Year for "DTMF", making Bad Bunny the first Latino, Hispanic, and Spanish-language artist to be simultaneously nominated in the three most prestigious categories. The album won Album of the Year, Best Música Urbana Album, and Best Global Music Performance for "Eoo". It became the first Spanish-language album to win Album of the Year. It also became the first album to win Album of the Year at both the Grammys and Latin Grammys.

== Background ==
On October 13, 2023, Bad Bunny released his fifth solo studio album, Nadie Sabe Lo Que Va a Pasar Mañana, which debuted at number one on the US Billboard 200 with 184,000 units and reached the top 10 in five more countries. The album release was followed by his fifth concert tour titled the Most Wanted Tour, spanning dates from February to June 2024, all of which sold out and broke multiple records. Outside of touring, Bad Bunny released collaborations with Myke Towers and Rauw Alejandro as well as the standalone single "Una Velita", co-produced by long-time collaborator Tainy.

He announced his sixth solo studio album, Debí Tirar Más Fotos, and supported it with two singles, "El Clúb" and "Pitorro de Coco". His decision on giving the album that title is because of him initially hating taking photos but eventually getting used to it, additionally stating that the idea is "enjoying the moment when I could and valuing memories".

== Music and themes ==
Debí Tirar Más Fotos is primarily a reggaeton album which heavily incorporates several elements of traditional Puerto Rican music, such as bomba, jíbaro, plena, and salsa; the album also contains influences of a cappella, bolero, cha-cha-chá, dembow, electronic, acoustic, alternative rock, ambient, ballad, reggae, dancehall, bossa nova, boogaloo, rumba, dance-pop, bachata, merengue, indie pop, hip-hop, jazz, R&B, soul, spoken word, sandungueo, and synth-pop. Production for the album was handled by Bad Bunny's frequent collaborators Tainy, La Paciencia, and MAG, along with new collaborators such as Big Jay and Saox.

=== Songs ===
The album's opening track, "Nuevayol", begins with a sample of "Un Verano en Nueva York", originally performed by Andy Montañez and El Gran Combo de Puerto Rico, later switching to a fusion of reggaeton and dembow rhythms, similar to the singer's 2022 single "Tití Me Preguntó". During an exclusive video interview with The New York Times, Bad Bunny stated that "Nuevayol" was one of the first songs written for the album, noting that the song represents the cultural and historical importance of Nuyoricans. He also explained its placement as the opening track, due to New York City being the gathering point of "the whole Latin American community". The third track, "Baile Inolvidable", runs at a length of six minutes and features a live salsa orchestra consisting of students from the Escuela Libre de Música in San Juan.

"Veldá," which features fellow Puerto Rican singers and rappers Omar Courtz and Dei V, is a hardcore reggaeton track that features a sandungueo beat and lyrics about online love exchanges, with a surprise appearance by fellow rapper Wisin towards the end of the track. The track samples Plan B's "No Voy a Esperar Por Ti" throughout. "El Clúb" is a house track with a fusion of electronic music and plena. On the bachata-influenced "Bokete", he compares an ex-girlfriend to a titular pothole, simultaneously functioning as a critique of the island's infrastructure. "Turista" is a slow-paced bolero with lyrics that reflect on a brief relationship, comparing it to the perspective of travelers who arrive in a country to briefly "enjoy what is there, yet, once they leave, they are not confronted with the struggles that local residents must face".

"Lo Que Le Pasó a Hawaii" features instrumentals composed of güiros and guitars, with Bad Bunny musically calling out the gentrification being faced in Puerto Rico and expressing his concern over the potential negative impact of the island's admission to the Union in the context of Hawaii. The track gained significant attention on social media sites such as Twitter and has been denounced by pro-statehood advocates (estadistas), some of whom continue to see Hawaii as a successful model for Puerto Rican statehood. Statehood advocates have occasionally accused Bad Bunny of supporting independence for Puerto Rico, particularly after his support for candidates linked to the Puerto Rican Independence Party and Citizens' Victory Movement such as Juan Dalmau for governor and Manuel Natal Albelo for the mayorship of San Juan, respectively.

"Eoo" evokes the reggaeton scene of the mid-1990s and 2000s, with its chorus being built around a sample of Héctor & Tito's track "Perreo Baby". Midway through the track, there is a sample taken from the final seconds of the singer's 2018 single "Solo de Mí," which is a recording of a woman saying "¡Mira, puñeta, no me quiten el perreo!" ('Look, damn it, don’t take away my perreo!'); the usage of this sample on both mentioned tracks would lead to a lawsuit filed by Tainaly Serrano Rivera, who is the woman in the recording, claiming this was done without permission.

The title track, "DTMF", is a "nostalgic" track that blends "Nintendo-inspired beats", reminiscent of his 2020 album YHLQMDLG, with "lively plena", a Puerto Rican "folk call-and-response" genre. On a "mellow beat" with occasional choir chants, Bad Bunny displays his emotions and regrets not having taken more pictures of loved ones or people with whom he had spent periods of time.

== Marketing ==
=== Promotion and release ===
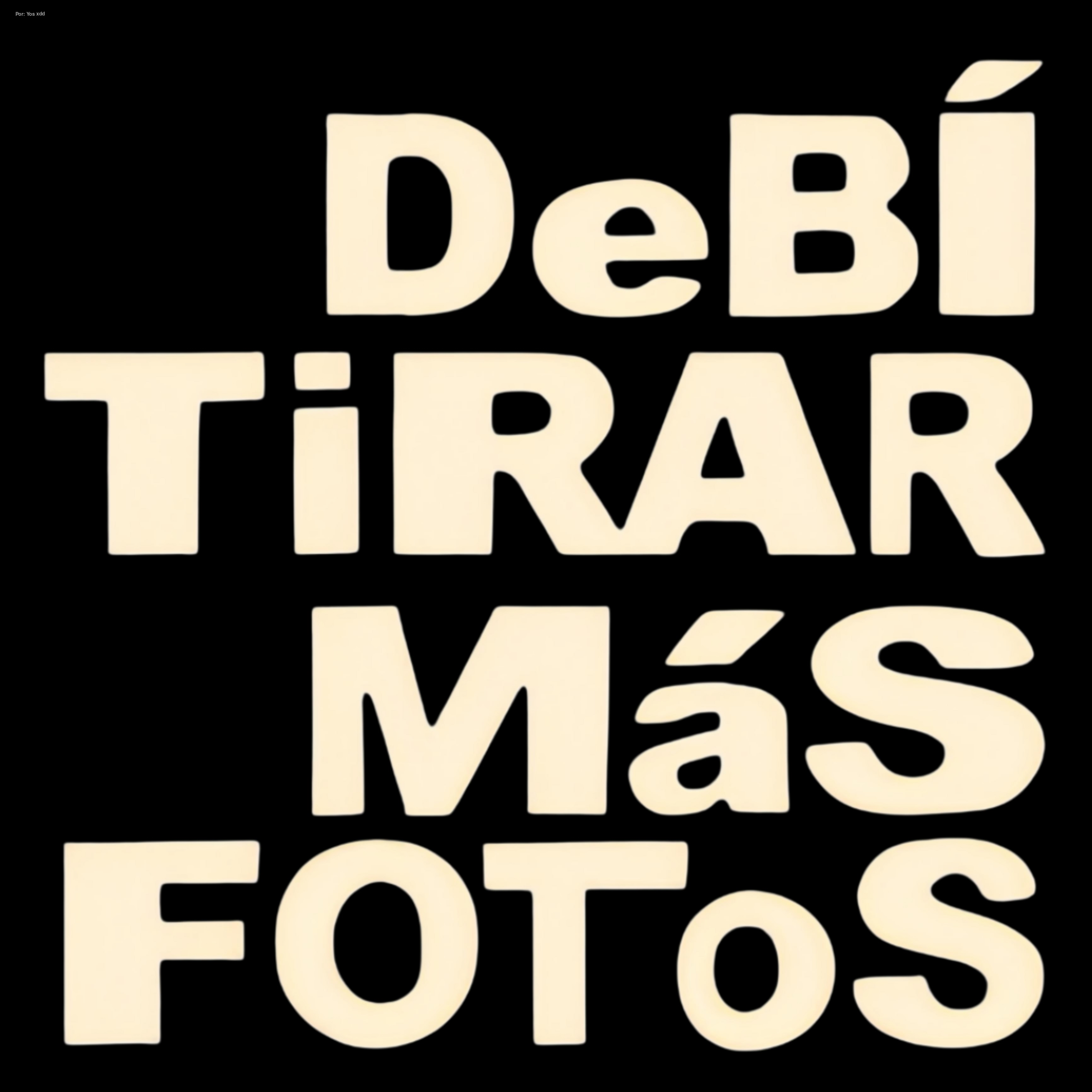
The logo used to promote the album, showing its title, stylized in alternating caps.

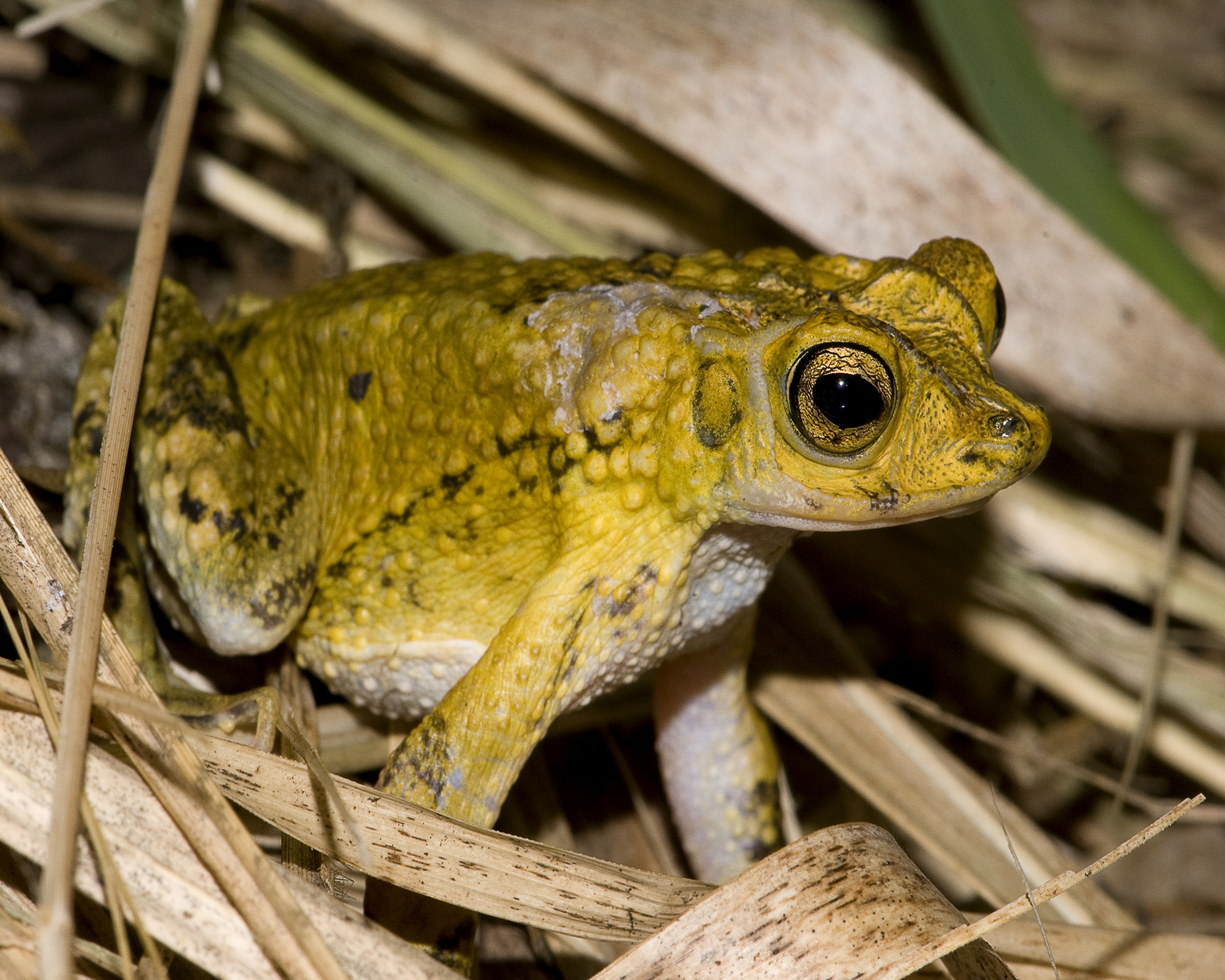
The Puerto Rican crested toad inspired the creation of Concho, the promotional mascot of the album.

On December 5, 2024, Bad Bunny released the lead single "El Clúb". The album's title was teased through the music video, simply displaying "DTmF 2025". On December 25, he tweeted a numbered list of 17 songs, all labeled as "bomba", a tactic also used to promote his previous albums. The album was officially announced the following day, alongside the release of the second single "Pitorro de Coco". The album's tracklist was revealed on January 3, 2025, along with an accompanying short film on YouTube, co-directed by Bad Bunny and starring actor, filmmaker and playwright Jacobo Morales.

The album was released on Sunday, January 5, 2025, at 12 p.m. ET, a day before Three Kings Day. In further promotion of the album, he served as a co-host on The Tonight Show Starring Jimmy Fallon on January 13, additionally performing "Voy a Llevarte Pa' PR". The same day, he announced the Puerto Rican-exclusive 2025 concert residency No Me Quiero Ir de Aquí (transl. "I don't want to leave here"), which took place at San Juan's Coliseo de Puerto Rico José Miguel Agrelot for 30 dates from early July to mid-September. He also hinted a worldwide tour across Latin America, Europe and Asia, which was officially announced on May 5, 2025, as the Debí Tirar Más Fotos World Tour. He performed an NPR Tiny Desk concert on April 7 alongside his backing band Los Sobrinos. On September 28, 2025, the rapper was announced as the headliner of the Super Bowl LX halftime show at Levi's Stadium in Santa Clara, California.

Following the album's release, multiple songs received music videos, including "Baile Inolvidable" on January 9, "Turista" on Valentine's Day, "La Mudanza" on March 11, his 31st birthday, "Bokete" on April 25, "Ketu Tecré" on May 16, and "Nuevayol" on July 4.

On February 6, 2026, the album was re-issued as 2-LP vinyl. In the United States, an eighteenth bonus track, "Alambre Púa" was included. This song was previously released July 14, 2025, on streaming services.

=== Artwork and visuals ===
The artwork for Debí Tirar Más Fotos was revealed on January 3, 2025. It features two Monobloc chairs placed on a dirt-and-grass field with banana trees in the background. According to Bianca Betancourt of Harper's Bazaar, the album cover is "meant to resonate" with both stateside and islander Puerto Ricans. His appearance in album promos notably included doning the pava hat traditional to Puerto Rico, which he also wore to the 2025 Met Gala as a tie-in.

The visualizers for each track on YouTube display the history of Puerto Rico as a slide presentation, with the content being compiled by Puerto Rican professor of the University of Wisconsin–Madison, Jorell Meléndez Badillo. These discuss moments such as the Spanish colonization, the acquisition of Puerto Rico by the United States, the Puerto Rican diaspora, repression and surveillance through the 20th century, the killing of student activist Antonia Martínez, and the creation of the Puerto Rican and Grito de Lares flags.

Additionally, Bad Bunny created the character Concho, which is a Puerto Rican crested toad, locally known as sapo concho. The toad is an endangered species, and its use as a promotional image of the album has had a strong impact on its conservation.

== Critical reception ==
Debí Tirar Más Fotos ratings
Aggregate scores
| Source | Rating |
|---|---|
| AnyDecentMusic? | 8.7/10 |
| Metacritic | 95/100 |
Review scores
| Source | Rating |
| AllMusic | 4.5/5 stars |
| Clash | 8/10 |
| NME | 5/5 stars |
| Pitchfork | 8.8/10 |
| PopMatters | 9/10 |
| Rolling Stone | 5/5 stars |

Debí Tirar Más Fotos was highly acclaimed by music critics. According to the review aggregator Metacritic, Debí Tirar Más Fotos received "universal acclaim" based on a weighted average score of 95 out of 100 from 8 critic scores. It is also currently the fifteenth highest-scoring album on the website. (Note: It was briefly rated a 98/100, which made it the third highest-scoring album, beating Brian Wilson Presents Smile (2004).)

In a five-star review, Maya Georgi of Rolling Stone called it a "homegrown, jubilant, and fresh" album and concluded her review by stating "[i]n Nadie Sabe, he claimed he was in his prime. Now, on Debí Tirar Más Fotos, it’s clear he finally is." NME's Lucas Villa commended the album for "revolutionizing Puerto Rico's folk music", as well as blending nostalgic sounds recalled from Bad Bunny's childhood with contemporary production.

Critics lauded the album for approaching political issues. Tatiana Lee Rodriguez of Pitchfork praised the narration of Puerto Rico's struggle for sovereignty "rooted in compounded centuries of Spanish, then American, colonization". Writing for AllMusic, David Crone called Debí Tirar Más Fotos a "Puerto Rican triumph". In a positive review, Clash's Robin Murray considered the album to be "a love letter to [Bad Bunny's] heritage" and additionally stated that it is "potent and personal".

=== Year-end rankings ===
Debí Tirar Más Fotos featured on several publications' year-end lists of 2025, including the top spot granted by Billboard, Complex, Harper's Bazaar, and Rolling Stone. It was placed within the top 5 of Business Insider, Dazed, Entertainment Weekly, The Fader, The Independent, NME, Pitchfork, PopMatters, and Vulture, and the top 10 of Los Angeles Times and The Guardian. The album appeared in the top 20 of the ranking by The Line of Best Fit, while also being listed in the top 40 of Beats Per Minute, Clash, Consequence, Paste, Slant Magazine, and Stereogum. Publications that featured Debí Tirar Más Fotos in unranked compilations include AllMusic, Associated Press, Cosmopolitan, Elle, HuffPost, Slate, Us Weekly, and Vogue. On individual critics' lists, the album was ranked first by Variety's Thania Garcia, and respectively fourth and ninth by The New York Times' Lindsay Zoladz and Jon Caramanica.

Select year-end rankings of Debí Tirar Más Fotos
| Critic/Publication | List | Rank | Ref. |
|---|---|---|---|
| Billboard | The 50 Best Albums of 2025 | 1 | |
| Business Insider | Best Albums of 2025 | 2 | |
| Complex | The 50 Best Albums of 2025 | 1 | |
| Entertainment Weekly | The Best 10 Albums of 2025 | 2 | |
| Harper's Bazaar | The 12 Best Albums of 2025 | 1 | |
| The New York Times | Lindsay Zoladz's Best Albums of 2025 | 4 | |
| PopMatters | 80 Best Albums of 2025 | 2 | |
| Rolling Stone | The 100 Best Albums of 2025 | 1 | |
| Variety | Thania Garcia's Top 10 Albums of 2025 | 1 | |
| Vulture | The Best Albums of 2025 | 3 | |

== Accolades ==
Awards and nominations for Debí Tirar Más Fotos
| Organization | Year | Category | Result | Ref. |
|---|---|---|---|---|
| American Music Awards | 2025 | Favorite Latin Album | Won | |
| Billboard Latin Music Awards | 2025 | Top Latin Album of the Year | Won | |
| Billboard Latin Music Awards | 2025 | Latin Rhythm Album of the Year | Won | |
| Grammy Awards | 2026 | Album of the Year | Won | |
| Grammy Awards | 2026 | Best Música Urbana Album | Won | |
| Grammy Awards | 2026 | Best Album Cover | Nominated | |
| Heat Latin Music Awards | 2025 | Album of the Year | Won | |
| Latin Grammy Awards | 2025 | Album of the Year | Won | |
| Latin Grammy Awards | 2025 | Best Urban Music Album | Won | |
| Lo Nuestro Awards | 2026 | Album of the Year | Won | |
| Los 40 Music Awards | 2025 | Best Latin Urban Album | Won | |
| MTV Video Music Awards | 2025 | Best Album | Nominated | |
| Premios Juventud | 2025 | Best Urban Album | Won | |

== Commercial performance ==
=== United States ===
Debí Tirar Más Fotos debuted at number two on the Billboard 200 for the week of January 18, 2025, behind Lil Baby's WHAM, with 122,000 album-equivalent units (of which only 8,000 were from pure album sales), making it Bad Bunny's seventh top-ten entry on the chart and his first album to not debut atop since YHLQMDLG (2020). This was attributed to its release on a Sunday as opposed to the industry-standard Friday, resulting in only five tracked days of activity. The following week, the album peaked at number one on the Billboard 200, earning 203,500 additional units mostly through streaming activity, with 7,500 from traditional album sales. It became Bad Bunny's fourth number-one album, as well as the sixth Spanish language album and the 28th non-English language album to top the chart. Additionally, it debuted atop both the US Top Latin Albums and Latin Rhythm Albums charts, becoming his ninth number-one album on both charts.

Seventeen of the album tracks (excluding the U.S.-only vinyl bonus track "Alambre Púa") were also charting on the US Billboard Hot 100. With this feat, Bad Bunny became the first Latin artist to attain over 100 song entries on the chart, and the eleventh artist with the most chart entries, totaling up to 113 entries. On the Hot Latin Songs chart, all of its tracks were also charting, with ten of its tracks charting in the entirety of the top-10 on the latter chart.

=== International markets ===
In Spain, the album debuted atop its album chart published by Productores de Música de España, becoming Bad Bunny's sixth consecutive album to peak at number one in the country. All of its tracks also charted in the country's accompanying singles chart, with nine of its tracks appearing in the top-10 section. In the Netherlands, Debí Tirar Más Fotos debuted at number one on the Dutch Album Top 100, becoming Bad Bunny's first chart-topping project and the 1,000th to reach this milestone in the country. On the Swiss Albums Chart, the album marked Bad Bunny's second consecutive number-one record in Switzerland after Nadie Sabe Lo Que Va a Pasar Mañana (2023). In the United Kingdom, the album debuted on 13. However, following the 2026 Grammy Awards and the Super Bowl LX halftime show, the album re-entered 44 and the next week peaked at number 2, barred from the top spot by Olivia Dean's The Art of Loving, becoming his first top 10 album ever in the country. Also, In France reached the number one on French Album Charts whit 14,000 equivalent units sold following the halftime show.

== Impact ==
The promotional cycle surrounding Debí Tirar Más Fotos generated substantial economic impact across multiple countries. A study by Indira Luciano Montalvo, associate professor of economics at the University of Puerto Rico at Río Piedras, estimated that the No Me Quiero Ir de Aquí residency generated a minimum of $176.6 million in economic activity through production revenue, employment, and audience spending, excluding ticket prices and in-venue expenses; Luciano Montalvo characterized this figure as "very conservative." Discover Puerto Rico, the island's nonprofit destination marketing organization, estimated the residency brought in approximately $200 million in tourist spending on lodging, transportation, and food, while a report from Gaither International estimated $733 million in total gains when accounting for increased international exposure and shifts in global perception of Puerto Rico. The 31 sold-out shows attracted over 500,000 attendees, with the first nine shows reserved exclusively for residents of Puerto Rico. The Puerto Rico Tourism Company reported that hotel occupancy rose 6 percent in July, reaching 85 percent compared to 79 percent the previous year, with projected increases of 10.1 percent in August and 12.2 percent in September. Approximately two million passengers passed through Luis Muñoz Marín International Airport during the residency period, with 40 percent composed of international visitors.

The residency also had a measurable effect on Puerto Rican artists featured on the album. Los Pleneros de la Cresta, who performed at all 31 shows and collaborated with Bad Bunny on "Café con Ron", grew from tens of thousands of monthly Spotify listeners to 12 million; the group used the increased revenue to fund cultural preservation projects through their nonprofit Acción Valerosa, including the restoration of the Yerba Bruja cultural center in Ciales. Local artisans reported a 340 percent increase in the sale of vejigante masks in Ponce, bookstores reported a 280 percent increase in sales of Puerto Rican authors, and local salsa, bomba, and plena artists reported an average income increase of 65 percent during the residency period.

The subsequent Debí Tirar Más Fotos World Tour sold over 2.6 million tickets within one week across 54 stadium shows in 18 countries, which Live Nation compared to the touring scale of Coldplay, Michael Jackson, Taylor Swift, and the Rolling Stones. According to Billboard Boxscore, the eight concerts at Estadio GNP Seguros in Mexico City (December 10–21, 2025) grossed $86.7 million from 518,000 tickets, making it the second highest-grossing concert series at a single venue, behind Coldplay's ten shows at Wembley Stadium. The Mexico City engagement reportedly generated $177 million in broader economic activity according to the National Chamber of Commerce, Services and Tourism of Mexico City, with approximately 45 percent of attendees traveling from abroad. The tour's first 12 shows collectively grossed $107 million from 697,000 tickets, surpassing the entire Latin American gross of Bad Bunny's previous World's Hottest Tour ($81.7 million across 22 dates).

== Track listing ==
Credits adapted from Apple Music and Tidal,

Debí Tirar Más Fotos track listing
| No. | Title | Writer(s) | Producer(s) | Length |
|---|---|---|---|---|
| 1. | "Nuevayol" | Benito Martínez; Marco Borrero; Roberto Rosado; Justi Barreto^{[a]} | Mag; La Paciencia | 3:04 |
| 2. | "Voy a Llevarte Pa' PR" | B. Martínez; Marcos Masís; Rosado; Cristobal Diaz; Juan Morera^{[b]}; Llandel Veguilla^{[b]}; Héctor Delgado^{[b]}; John Taylor; Everton Bonner; Lowell Dunbar; Lloyd Willis; Raúl Ortíz^{[b]}; Joel Martínez^{[b]}; Ángel Rivera^{[b]}; Christian Colón^{[b]}; Francisco Saldaña^{[b]}; Norgie Noriega^{[b]} | Tainy; La Paciencia; Dysbit | 2:36 |
| 3. | "Baile Inolvidable" | B. Martínez; Armando López; Antonio Caraballo; Luis Irizarry; Wilfredo Vargas; Borrero; Rosado; Kaled Rivera; Jay Nuñez; Julito Gastón | Mag; La Paciencia; Elikai; Big Jay; Gastón | 6:08 |
| 4. | "Perfumito Nuevo" (with RaiNao) | B. Martínez; Naomi Ramírez; Marcos Masís; Rosado; Ricardo López | Tainy; La Paciencia; Richie López | 3:21 |
| 5. | "Weltita" (with Chuwi) | B. Martínez; Wilfredo Aldarondo; Lorén Aldarondo; Wester Aldarondo; Adrián López; Pau Donés^{[c]}; Rosado; Eduardo Cabra; Samuel Jiménez; Marlon Betancourt; Nuñez | La Paciencia; Smash David; Cabra; Big Jay; Digital Jet; Wilfredo Aldarondo; Wester Aldarondo | 3:08 |
| 6. | "Veldá" (with Omar Courtz and Dei V) | B. Martínez; Joshua Medina; David Rivera; Marcos Masís; Rosado; Michael Hernandez; Sebastian Encarnacion; Frank Packer; Juan Diaz; Nicolas Martínez; Morera; Kenneth Rivera; Orlando Valle^{[d]}; Edwin Vazquez^{[d]}; Vladimir Félix^{[d]} | Tainy; La Paciencia; Foreign Teck; Bassy; Frank King; the Osakis; KarBeats | 3:55 |
| 7. | "El Clúb" | B. Martínez; Borrero; Rosado; Alvaro Barranco; Yuval Chain; Scott Dittrich; Willkar Soto; Benjamin Falik; Martin Coogan; Aidan Cullen | Mag; La Paciencia; Saox; Uv Killin Em; Scotty Dittrich; the Change; Julia Lewis; Mick Coogan; Cullen | 3:43 |
| 8. | "Ketu Tecré" | B. Martínez; Marcos Masís; Borrero; Rosado | Tainy; Mag; La Paciencia | 4:11 |
| 9. | "Bokete" | B. Martínez; Borrero; Rosado; Coogan; Oskar Purcell; Amman Nurani | Mag; La Paciencia; Coogan; Don Oskar; Evrgrn | 3:36 |
| 10. | "Kloufrens" | B. Martínez; Marcos Masís; Borrero; Rosado; Tyler Spry; Michael Masís; Misael de la Cruz | Tainy; Mag; La Paciencia; Coogan; Spry; Mvsis; De la Cruz | 3:19 |
| 11. | "Turista" | B. Martínez; Borrero; Rosado; Jonathan Asperil; Dittrich | Mag; La Paciencia; Asperil; Dittrich | 3:10 |
| 12. | "Café con Ron" (with Los Pleneros de la Cresta) | B. Martínez; Caraballo; Jeyluix Ocasio; Joseph Ocasio; Joshuan Ocasio; Josué Figueroa; Borrero; Rosado | Mag; La Paciencia | 3:49 |
| 13. | "Pitorro de Coco" | B. Martínez; Marcos Masís; Borrero; Rosado; Jesús Sanchez^{[e]} | Tainy; Mag; La Paciencia | 3:27 |
| 14. | "Lo Que Le Pasó a Hawaii" | B. Martínez; Irizarry; Marcos Masís; Borrero; Rosado; Nuñez; Florencio Morales Ramos | Tainy; Mag; La Paciencia; Big Jay; Irizarry | 3:49 |
| 15. | "Eoo" | B. Martínez; Marcos Masís; Rosado; Delgado^{[f]}; Efrain Fines-Nevares^{[f]}; Rafael Pina^{[f]} | Tainy; La Paciencia | 3:25 |
| 16. | "DTMF" | B. Martínez; Borrero; Rosado; Hugo Sencion; Dittrich; Falik; Spry | Mag; La Paciencia; Hydra Hitz; Dittrich; Lewis; Spry | 3:57 |
| 17. | "La Mudanza" | B. Martínez; Irizarry; Marcos Masís; Rosado; Nuñez; Gastón | Tainy; La Paciencia; Big Jay; Gastón; Irizarry | 3:33 |
| Total length: | | | | 62:11 |

Reissue bonus track (U.S. vinyl exclusive)
| No. | Title | Writer(s) | Producer(s) | Length |
|---|---|---|---|---|
| 18. | "Alambre Púa" | B. Martínez; Irizarry; Marcos Masís; Rosado | Tainy; La Paciencia; Irizarry | 2:26 |
| Total length: | | | | 64:37 |

=== Notes ===
- All track titles are stylized in a form of text notation similar to alternating caps; for example, "DTMF" is stylized "DtMF".
- "Alambre Púa" is a hidden track and is not listed on vinyl reissues.
- ^{^[a]}"Nuevayol" contains samples of "Un Verano en Nueva York", written by Justi Barreto and performed by Andy Montañez and El Gran Combo de Puerto Rico, and a post-fight interview from Oscar De La Hoya vs. Félix Trinidad.
- ^{^[b]}"Voy a Llevarte Pa' PR" contains interpolations of the following songs:
  - "La Barria", written and performed by Wisin & Yandel featuring Héctor el Father;
  - "Me Quiere Besar", written and performed by Alexis & Fido,
  - and "Cazando Voy", written and performed by Ángel & Khriz.
- "Baile Inolvidable" features dialogue by Jacobo Morales, excerpted from the Debí Tirar Más Fotos short film.
- ^{^[c]}"Weltita" contains an interpolation of "La Flaca", written by Pau Donés and performed by Jarabe de Palo.
- ^{^[d]}"Veldá" contains a sample of "No Voy a Esperar por Ti", as performed by Plan B.
- ^{^[e]}"Pitorro de Coco" contains a sample of "Si Yo Fuera Alcalde", written and performed by Chuíto el de Bayamón.
- ^{^[f]}"Eoo" contains elements of "Perreo Baby", written and performed by Héctor & Tito, and "Solo de Mí", written by Martínez and Ismael Flores, and performed by Bad Bunny.

== Personnel ==
=== Vocals ===
- Bad Bunny – lead vocals
- RaiNao – vocals (track 4)
- Omar Courtz – vocals (track 6)
- Dei V – vocals (track 6)

=== Additional vocals ===
- Elliott Romero – background vocals (track 1)^{[a]}
- Paquito Guzman – background vocals (track 1)^{[a]}
- Krystal Santana – background vocals (tracks 3, 16, 17)
- Joshuan Ocasio – background vocals (track 3)
- Josué Figueroa – background vocals (track 3)
- Jeyluix Ocasio – background vocals (track 3)
- Joseph Ocasio – background vocals (track 3)
- Mora – background vocals (track 3)
- Wilfredo Aldarondo – background vocals (track 5)
- Wester Aldarondo – background vocals (track 5)
- Adrian López – background vocals (track 5)
- Wisin – background vocals (track 6)
- Yaritza Zayas – soprano (track 14)
- Nacha Padilla – soprano (track 14)
- Patricia Vásquez – alto (track 14)
- Ricardo Sepulveda – tenor (track 14)
- Sheizel Garcia – vocal effects (track 14)
- Eyeri Yrady – background vocals (tracks 16, 17)
- Roig Berríos – background vocals (tracks 16, 17)
- Oscar Oller – background vocals (track 16)
- Julito Gastón – background vocals (tracks 16, 17)
- Luis Irizarry – background vocals (tracks 16, 17)
- Big Jay – background vocals (tracks 16, 17)
- Jonathan Martínez – background vocals (tracks 16, 17)
- Krystal Santana – background vocals (track 16, 17)
- Rylee López – background vocals (tracks 16, 17)
- Luis Figueroa – background vocals (track 17)
- Manny Reyes - background vocals (track 3,16, 17)

=== Musicians ===
- Los Sobrinos:
  - Julito Gastón – bongos (tracks 3, 13, 17), congas (tracks 3, 17), bells (track 3), drums (tracks 4, 14), güiro (track 16)
  - Krystal Santana – electric bass guitar (track 3), bass guitar (tracks 13, 17)
  - Ronyel Cruz – maracas (tracks 3, 17)
  - Sebástian Torres – piano (track 3)
  - Edgar Sálaman – timpani (tracks 3, 17)
  - Darnell García – trombone (tracks 3, 17), güiro (track 16)
  - Oscar Oller – trombone (tracks 3, 17)
  - Luis Figueroa – trumpet (track 3, 17)
  - Roig Berríos – trumpet (tracks 3, 17)
- Diego Centeno – maracas, güiro (tracks 3, 17)
- Angel Machado – trumpet (track 3)
- Wilfredo Aldarondo – bass guitar (track 5)
- Wester Aldarondo – piano (track 5)
- Ádrian Lopez – congas, drums (track 5)
- Tyler Spry – keyboards (tracks 8, 10), programming, electric bass guitar (track 8), piano, electric guitar (tracks 10, 16)
- Jonathan "Yoni" Asperil – acoustic guitar (track 11)
- Jaycob Vargas – acoustic guitar (track 11)
- Scotty Dittrich – acoustic guitar (track 11)
- Los Pleneros de la Cresta – drums (track 12)
- Jeyluix Ocasio – güiro (track 12)
- Tainy – piano (tracks 12, 14)
- Antonio Caraballo – güiro (track 13)
- José Santana – acoustic guitar (track 13)
- Luis Irizarry – piano (track 14, 17)
- Emanuel Santana – güicharo (track 14)
- Luis Sanz – cuatro (track 14)
- José Camuy – bass guitar (track 14)
- Jerry Rivas – trombone (track 14)
- Deven Velázquez – trombone, bass guitar (track 14)
- Rubén Ramirez – tuba (track 14)

=== Technical ===
- Colin Leonard – mastering
- Josh Gudwin – mixing (tracks 1-4, 6-17)
- Fab Dupont – mixing (track 5)
- La Paciencia – recording engineer
- Antonio Caraballo – recording engineer (tracks 3, 11-12)
- Armando López – recording engineer (track 3)
- Matteo Burr – recording engineer (track 3)
- Eduardo Cabra – recording engineer (track 5)
- Sebastián Otero – recording engineer (track 5)
- Luis Irizarry – recording engineer (tracks 14, 17)
- José Perez – recording engineer (tracks 14, 17)
- Tyler Spry – additional engineer (track 16)

== Charts ==
=== Weekly charts ===
Weekly chart performance for Debí Tirar Más Fotos
| Chart (2025–2026) | Peak position |
|---|---|
| Australian Albums (ARIA) | 4 |
| Austrian Albums (Ö3 Austria) | 1 |
| Belgian Albums (Ultratop Flanders) | 1 |
| Belgian Albums (Ultratop Wallonia) | 1 |
| Canadian Albums (Billboard) | 1 |
| Danish Albums (Hitlisten) | 1 |
| Dutch Albums (Album Top 100) | 1 |
| Finnish Albums (Suomen virallinen lista) | 2 |
| French Albums (SNEP) | 1 |
| German Albums (Offizielle Top 100) | 1 |
| Hungarian Albums (MAHASZ) | 1 |
| Icelandic Albums (Tónlistinn) | 7 |
| Irish Albums (Official Charts) | 2 |
| Irish Independent Albums (IRMA) | 1 |
| Italian Albums (FIMI) | 1 |
| Japanese Dance & Soul Albums (Oricon) | 11 |
| Japanese Digital Albums (Oricon) | 24 |
| Japanese Hot Albums (Billboard Japan) | 24 |
| Lithuanian Albums (AGATA) | 1 |
| New Zealand Albums (RMNZ) | 4 |
| Norwegian Albums (VG-lista) | 2 |
| Polish Albums (ZPAV) | 1 |
| Portuguese Albums (AFP) | 1 |
| Scottish Albums (Official Charts) | 8 |
| Spanish Albums (Promusicae) | 1 |
| Swedish Albums (Sverigetopplistan) | 2 |
| Swiss Albums (Schweizer Hitparade) | 1 |
| UK Albums (Official Charts) | 2 |
| UK Independent Albums (Official Charts) | 6 |
| US Billboard 200 | 1 |
| US Independent Albums (Billboard) | 1 |
| US Top Latin Albums (Billboard) | 1 |
| US Latin Rhythm Albums (Billboard) | 1 |

=== Year-end charts ===
Year-end chart performance for Debí Tirar Más Fotos
| Chart (2025) | Position |
|---|---|
| Austrian Albums (Ö3 Austria) | 9 |
| Belgian Albums (Ultratop Flanders) | 19 |
| Belgian Albums (Ultratop Wallonia) | 4 |
| Canadian Albums (Billboard) | 35 |
| Danish Albums (Hitlisten) | 92 |
| Dutch Albums (Album Top 100) | 10 |
| French Albums (SNEP) | 12 |
| German Albums (Offizielle Top 100) | 16 |
| Global Albums (IFPI) | 4 |
| Hungarian Albums (MAHASZ) | 29 |
| Icelandic Albums (Tónlistinn) | 69 |
| Italian Albums (FIMI) | 4 |
| Spanish Albums (PROMUSICAE) | 1 |
| Swedish Albums (Sverigetopplistan) | 53 |
| Swiss Albums (Schweizer Hitparade) | 1 |
| US Billboard 200 | 8 |
| US Top Latin Albums (Billboard) | 1 |

== Certifications ==
Certifications and sales for Debí Tirar Más Fotos
| Region | Certification | Certified units/sales |
|---|---|---|
| Austria (IFPI Austria) | Platinum | 15,000^{‡} |
| Denmark (IFPI Danmark) | Platinum | 20,000^{‡} |
| France (SNEP) | 3× Platinum | 300,000^{‡} |
| Germany (BVMI) | Platinum | 150,000^{‡} |
| Italy (FIMI) | 5× Platinum | 250,000^{‡} |
| New Zealand (RMNZ) | Gold | 7,500^{‡} |
| Norway (IFPI Norway) | Gold | 10,000^{‡} |
| Portugal (AFP) | 7× Platinum | 49,000^{‡} |
| Spain (Promusicae) | 10× Platinum | 400,000^{‡} |
| United Kingdom (BPI) | Gold | 100,000^{‡} |
^{‡} Sales+streaming figures based on certification alone.

== Release history ==
Release history
| Date | Label(s) | Format(s) | Ref. |
|---|---|---|---|
| January 5, 2025 | Rimas | Digital download; streaming | |
| April 2025 | Rimas | 2LP | |
| January 16, 2026 | Rimas | Vinyl | |
| February 6, 2026 | Rimas | Vinyl | |

== See also ==
- 2025 in Latin music
- List of number-one Billboard Latin Albums from the 2020s
- List of number-one Billboard Latin Rhythm Albums of 2025
- List of Billboard 200 number-one albums of 2025
