= Chuwi (band) =

Puerto Rican musical group

- Origin: Isabela, Puerto Rico
- Genres: Tropical, Neo-psychedelia
- Years active: 2019–present
- Members: Willy Aldarondo; Lorén Aldarondo; Wester J. Aldarondo; Adrián López

Chuwi is a Puerto Rican musical group that formed in 2019 in Isabela, Puerto Rico.

== History ==
The group was created by siblings Willy, Lorén and Wester Aldarondo in the Puerto Rican city of Isabela. The group grew up in the context of the protests in Puerto Rico in the wake of Telegramgate since in their lyrics, they vindicate themes such as the independence of Puerto Rico, migration and gentrification, among others. Chuwi has caught the attention of musicians such as Eduardo Cabra and Buscabulla.

Chuwi is featured in Bad Bunny's sixth solo studio album Debí Tirar Más Fotos, released on January 5, 2025, with the single "Weltita", as well as during the entirety of the rapper's concert residency No Me Quiero Ir de Aquí, held at the José Miguel Agrelot Coliseum, from July to September 2025. Along with this, the group performed as the sole opening act for Bad Bunny throughout his Debí Tirar Más Fotos World Tour from November 2025 to August 2026.

== Discography ==
EP's:

- Pan (2022)
- Tierra (2024)

LP's:

- Libertad (2026)

=== Charted singles ===
Title	Year	Peak chart positions										Certifications	Album
Title	Year	US	US Latin	ARG	CHL	COL	ECU	MEX	PER	SPA	WW	Certifications	Album
"Weltita" (with Bad Bunny)	2024	32	8	8	7	7	7	15	6	7	12	PROMUSICAE: Platinum	Debí Tirar Más Fotos

== Tour ==
On August 13th, 2025, Chuwi announced their first-ever tour in the U.S. The 'Chuwi tour' consisted of eight dates that included two festivals and six headline shows. The location of the shows included Austin, Texas (Austin City Limits & Antone's), New York, New York (Crown Hill Theatre), Philadelphia, Pennsylvania (Taller Puertorriqueño), North Adams, Massachusetts (MASS MoCA), Somerville, Massachusetts (Crystal Ballroom), Orlando, Florida (The Social), and Miami, Florida (lll Points).
