= El Clúb =

Single by Bad Bunny

from the album Debí Tirar Más Fotos
- Language: Spanish
- English title: "The Club"
- Released: December 5, 2024
- Genre: House
- Length: 3:42
- Label: Rimas
- Songwriters: Benito Martínez; Marco Borrero; Scotty Dittrich
- Producers: MAG; La Paciencia; Saox; Uv Killin Em; Scotty Dittrich; the Change; Julia Lewis; Mick Coogan; Aidan Cullen

Bad Bunny singles chronology
"Qué Pasaría..." (2024)	"El Clúb" (2024)	"Pitorro de Coco" (2024)

Music video
- "El Clúb" on YouTube

"El Clúb" [sic] (stylized as "EL CLúB"; transl. "The Club") is a song by Puerto Rican rapper Bad Bunny. It was released on December 5, 2024, through Rimas Entertainment, as the lead single from his sixth solo studio album, Debí Tirar Más Fotos (2025).

== Music and lyrics ==
"El Clúb" is a house track with a fusion of electronic music and plena. It is an "ethereal" track that fuses "pulse-quickening house beats" with a "nostalgic" feel. Lyrically, the song encapsulates "the longing for a life chapter that still holds a special place in memory."

== Music video ==
An official music video was released alongside the single on December 5, 2024. Directed by Stillz, the video opens with Bad Bunny in a fur coat entering a packed club where he joins a crowd of beautiful women. After he returns home, a montage of AI-generated images and other “memories” flash across the screen as Bunny wonders, “What could my ex be doing?" The video then fast-forwards to the artist walking away from a house on fire with a box of belongings and finding a spot to bury the memories, placing a Puerto Rican flag on the spot. The video ends with Bad Bunny heading to the 15th floor of a building and the words "DTmF" and "2025", teasing the release of his album.

== Charts ==
=== Weekly charts ===
Weekly chart performance for "El Clúb"
Chart (2024–2026)	Peak position
Argentina Hot 100 (Billboard)	21
Bolivia (Billboard)	4
Canada Hot 100 (Billboard)	89
Central America + Caribbean (FONOTICA)	13
Chile (Billboard)	9
Colombia (Billboard)	10
Costa Rica (FONOTICA)	9
Ecuador (Billboard)	4
France (SNEP)	100
Global 200 (Billboard)	15
Greece International (IFPI)	69
Honduras (Monitor Latino)	12
Italy (FIMI)	68
Latin America (Monitor Latino)	15
Mexico (Billboard)	18
New Zealand Hot Singles (RMNZ)	40
Panama (PRODUCE)	43
Peru (Billboard)	9
Portugal (AFP)	16
Puerto Rico (Monitor Latino)	4
Spain (PROMUSICAE)	3
US Billboard Hot 100	27
US Hot Latin Songs (Billboard)	2
US Hot Latin Rhythm Songs (Billboard)	9
US Latin Airplay (Billboard)	2

=== Year-end charts ===
Year-end chart performance for "El Clúb"
Chart (2025)	Position
US Hot Latin Songs (Billboard)	17

== Certifications ==
Certifications for "El Clúb"
Region	Certification	Certified units/sales
Portugal (AFP)	Gold	12,000^{‡}
Spain (Promusicae)	Platinum	60,000^{‡}
^{‡} Sales+streaming figures based on certification alone.
