= Eoo (song) =

Single by Bad Bunny

from the album Debí Tirar Más Fotos
- Language: Spanish
- Released: April 22, 2025
- Genre: Reggaeton
- Length: 3:25
- Label: Rimas
- Lyricist: Benito Martínez
- Producers: Tainy; La Paciencia; Tito El Bambino; Rafael Pina; Héctor Delgado

Bad Bunny singles chronology
"DTMF" (2025)	"Eoo" (2025)	"Alambre Púa" (2025)

Visualizer
- "Eoo" on YouTube

"Eoo" (stylized as "EoO") is a song by Puerto Rican rapper Bad Bunny. It was initially released on January 5, 2025, through Rimas Entertainment, as part of his sixth studio album, Debí Tirar Más Fotos, and was sent to US contemporary hit radio on April 22, 2025, as the album's fifth single. The song won the Grammy Award for Best Global Music Performance at the 2026 Grammy Awards.

== Background and release ==
The song's title was first revealed in the video for "Acho PR" and was initially named as an album as well, generating speculation that Bad Bunny's next album would be called that.

On January 3, 2025, when the track listing for Debí Tirar Más Fotos was revealed, was where the song was revealed, being included as the fifteenth track.

== Live performances and usage ==
Bad Bunny performed the song live for the first time at the 2025 iHeartRadio Music Awards in March 2025. He performed the song at the Super Bowl LX halftime show in February 2026. The song was the final song Bad Bunny performed on his setlist for the 2025-2026 Debí Tirar Más Fotos World Tour.

The song appeared in the 2026 film Spider-Man: Brand New Day. It featured in the 2026 video game Grand Theft Auto VI as part of Cocoteo FM radio.

== Charts ==
=== Weekly charts ===
Weekly chart performance for "Eoo"
Chart (2025–2026)	Peak position
Argentina Hot 100 (Billboard)	22
Australia (ARIA)	56
Bolivia (Billboard)	3
Canada Hot 100 (Billboard)	15
Central America (Monitor Latino)	6
Central America + Caribbean (BMAT)	12
Chile (Billboard)	5
Colombia (Billboard)	5
Costa Rica Airplay (Monitor Latino)	19
Costa Rica Streaming (FONOTICA)	3
Ecuador (Billboard)	2
El Salvador Airplay (ASAP EGC)	2
France (SNEP)	31
Germany (GfK)	23
Global 200 (Billboard)	4
Greece International (IFPI)	4
Guatemala (Monitor Latino)	6
Honduras Airplay (Monitor Latino)	1
Iceland (Billboard)	17
Israel (Mako Hitlist)	74
Italy (FIMI)	23
Latin America (Monitor Latino)	15
Lithuania (AGATA)	7
Luxembourg (Billboard)	13
Mexico (Billboard)	9
Nicaragua (Monitor Latino)	5
Norway (IFPI Norge)	58
Peru (Billboard)	2
Peru (Monitor Latino)	7
Poland (Polish Streaming Top 100)	61
Portugal (AFP)	7
Romania (Billboard)	6
Slovakia Singles Digital (ČNS IFPI)	36
Spain (Promusicae)	8
Sweden (Sverigetopplistan)	43
UK Indie (Official Charts)	9
UK Singles Sales (OCC)	90
UK Streaming (OCC)	81
US Billboard Hot 100	11
US Hot Latin Songs (Billboard)	2
US Hot Latin Rhythm Songs (Billboard)	4
US Pop Airplay (Billboard)	31
US Rhythmic Airplay (Billboard)	10

=== Monthly charts ===
Monthly chart performance for "Eoo"
Chart (2025–2026)	Peak position
Paraguay Airplay (SGP)	14
Uruguay Streaming (CUD)	19

=== Year-end charts ===
Year-end chart performance for "Eoo"
Chart (2025)	Position
Central America Airplay (Monitor Latino)	8
Chile Airplay (Monitor Latino)	55
El Salvador Airplay (ASAP EGC)	3
Global 200 (Billboard)	55
US Billboard Hot 100	77
US Hot Latin Songs (Billboard)	4

== Certifications ==
Certifications and sales for "Eoo"
Region	Certification	Certified units/sales
France (SNEP)	Platinum	200,000^{‡}
Italy (FIMI)	Platinum	200,000^{‡}
Portugal (AFP)	2× Platinum	50,000^{‡}
Spain (Promusicae)	4× Platinum	400,000^{‡}
United Kingdom (BPI)	Silver	200,000^{‡}
Streaming
Greece (IFPI Greece)	Platinum	2,000,000^{†}
^{‡} Sales+streaming figures based on certification alone.^{†} Streaming-only figures based on certification alone.

== Release history ==
Release dates and formats for "Eoo"
Region	Date	Format(s)	Label(s)	Ref.
United States	April 22, 2025	Contemporary hit radio	Rimas	
