= Los Pleneros de la Cresta =

Puerto Rican plena ensemble

- Origin: Ciales, Puerto Rico
- Genres: Plena; Latin
- Years active: 2013–present
- Website: losplenerosdelacresta.com

Los Pleneros de la Cresta is a Puerto Rican plena ensemble.

== History ==
The group was founded in 2013 by Joseph Ocasio Rivera, Joshuan Ocasio Rivera, Jeyluix Ocasio Rivera, and Josué Román Figueroa, who were students at the University of Puerto Rico, Río Piedras Campus. The ensemble was initially created to teach students how to play plena. Soon after, the founding members officially established the group and named it La Cresta, inspired by the University's symbolic rooster.

The ensemble was featured in Bad Bunny's 2025 album, Debí Tirar Más Fotos, in the songs "Café con Ron" and "Baile Inolvidable".

In 2026, Los Pleneros de la Cresta took part in Super Bowl LX halftime show, joining its headliner Bad Bunny as they sang "Café con Ron" and other songs.

== Musical style ==
Los Pleneros de la Cresta's music is rooted in plena, a traditional Afro-Puerto Rican genre characterized by narrative lyrics and rhythmic pandereta drumming. Plena emerged in Southern Puerto Rico in the early 20th century and is celebrated for its storytelling and cultural expression.

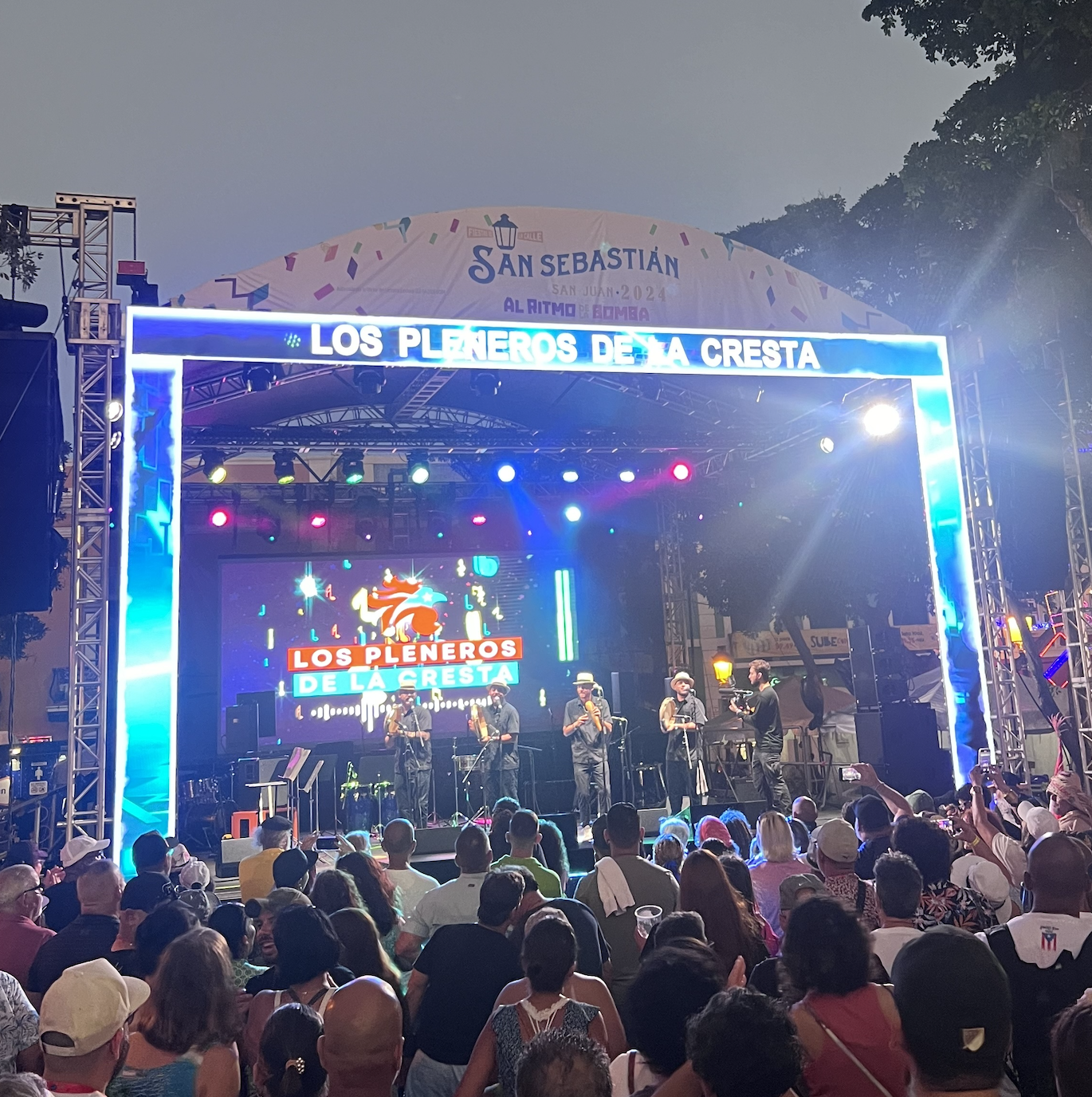
Live performance by Los Pleneros de la Cresta at the San Sebastián festival in San Juan, Puerto Rico (2024)

== Discography ==
=== Studio albums ===
- Mucho Gusto, Soy de la Isla (2015)
- Puerto Rico Vive (2021)
- Sentimiento y Cultura (2024)
