= Pitorro de Coco =

Single by Bad Bunny

from the album Debí Tirar Más Fotos
- Language: Spanish
- English title: "Coconut Pitorro"
- Released: December 26, 2024
- Genre: Jíbaro
- Length: 3:26
- Label: Rimas
- Songwriters: Benito Martínez; Marco Masís; Marco Borrero
- Producers: Tainy; MAG; La Paciencia; Chuíto el de Bayamón

Bad Bunny singles chronology
| "El Clúb" (2024) | "Pitorro de Coco" (2024) | "Baile Inolvidable" (2025) |

Music video
- "Pitorro de Coco" on YouTube

"Pitorro de Coco" (stylized as "PIToRRO DE COCO"; transl. "Coconut Pitorro") is a song by Puerto Rican rapper Bad Bunny. It was released on December 26, 2024, through Rimas Entertainment, as the second single from his sixth solo studio album, Debí Tirar Más Fotos (2025).

== Music and lyrics ==
Named after a Puerto Rican rum, "Pitorro de Coco" deals with the artist's heartbreak over a previous lover during the holidays. It explores themes of loneliness and nostalgia as the new year approaches and incorporates elements of Puerto Rican artist Chuíto el de Bayamón's iconic Christmas song from his album Música Jíbara Para Las Navidades. The song embraces Bad Bunny's roots with a pure jíbaro rhythm, a traditional Afro-Caribbean genre from Puerto Rico.

== Music video ==
An official music video was released for the single on December 31, 2024. Directed by Benito Antonio himself and Robison Florian, the video sees the artist dressed in a baby blue suit, sunglasses and a winter trapper hat in the middle of a festive New Year's party. Around him the party goes on, including several women walking past the camera, while Bad Bunny sits on a plastic chair in the center of the frame and sings about missing his lover during the holiday.

== Charts ==
Chart performance for "Pitorro de Coco"
| Chart (2025–2026) | Peak position |
|---|---|
| Argentina Hot 100 (Billboard) | 59 |
| Bolivia (Billboard) | 22 |
| Chile (Billboard) | 25 |
| Colombia (Billboard) | 20 |
| Costa Rica (FONOTICA) | 19 |
| Ecuador (Billboard) | 16 |
| France (SNEP) | 177 |
| Global 200 (Billboard) | 33 |
| Portugal (AFP) | 35 |
| Spain (PROMUSICAE) | 11 |
| US Billboard Hot 100 | 50 |
| US Hot Latin Songs (Billboard) | 10 |
| US Hot Tropical Songs (Billboard) | 6 |

== Certifications ==
Certifications for "Pitorro de Coco"
| Region | Certification | Certified units/sales |
|---|---|---|
| Portugal (AFP) | Gold | 12,000^{‡} |
| Spain (Promusicae) | Platinum | 100,000^{‡} |
^{‡} Sales+streaming figures based on certification alone.
