= Alternating caps =

Form of text notation

Alternating caps, also known as studly caps, (Note: "Studly caps" may sometimes refer to Pascal Case (upper camel case).) sticky caps (where "caps" is short for capital letters), or spongecase (in reference to the "Mocking SpongeBob" Internet meme) is a form of text notation in which the capitalization of letters varies by some pattern, or arbitrarily (often also omitting spaces between words and occasionally some letters). An example of this would be spelling "alternating caps" as "aLtErNaTiNg CaPs".

== History ==
According to the Jargon File, the origin and significance of the practice is obscure. The term "alternating case" has been used as early as the 1970s, in several studies on word identification.

Arbitrary variation found popularity among adolescent users during the BBS and early WWW eras of online culture, as if in parody of the marginally less idiosyncratic capitalization found in common trade and service marks of the time. This method was extensively used since the 1980s in the BBS-world and warez scene (for example in FILE_ID.DIZ and .nfo files) to show "elite" (or elitist) attitude, the often used variant was using small-caps vowels and capitalised consonants ("THiS iS aN eXCePTioNaLLy eLiTe SeNTeNCe.") or reversed capitals ("eXTENDED kEY gENERATOR pRO"). The iNiQUiTY BBS software based on Renegade had a feature to support two variants of this automatically: either all vowels would be uppercase or all vowels would be lowercase, with the consonants as the other case.

A meme known as "Mocking SpongeBob" more broadly popularized using alternating caps to convey a mocking tone starting in May 2017, leading to alternating caps becoming a mainstream method of conveying mockery in text.

== Usage and effect ==
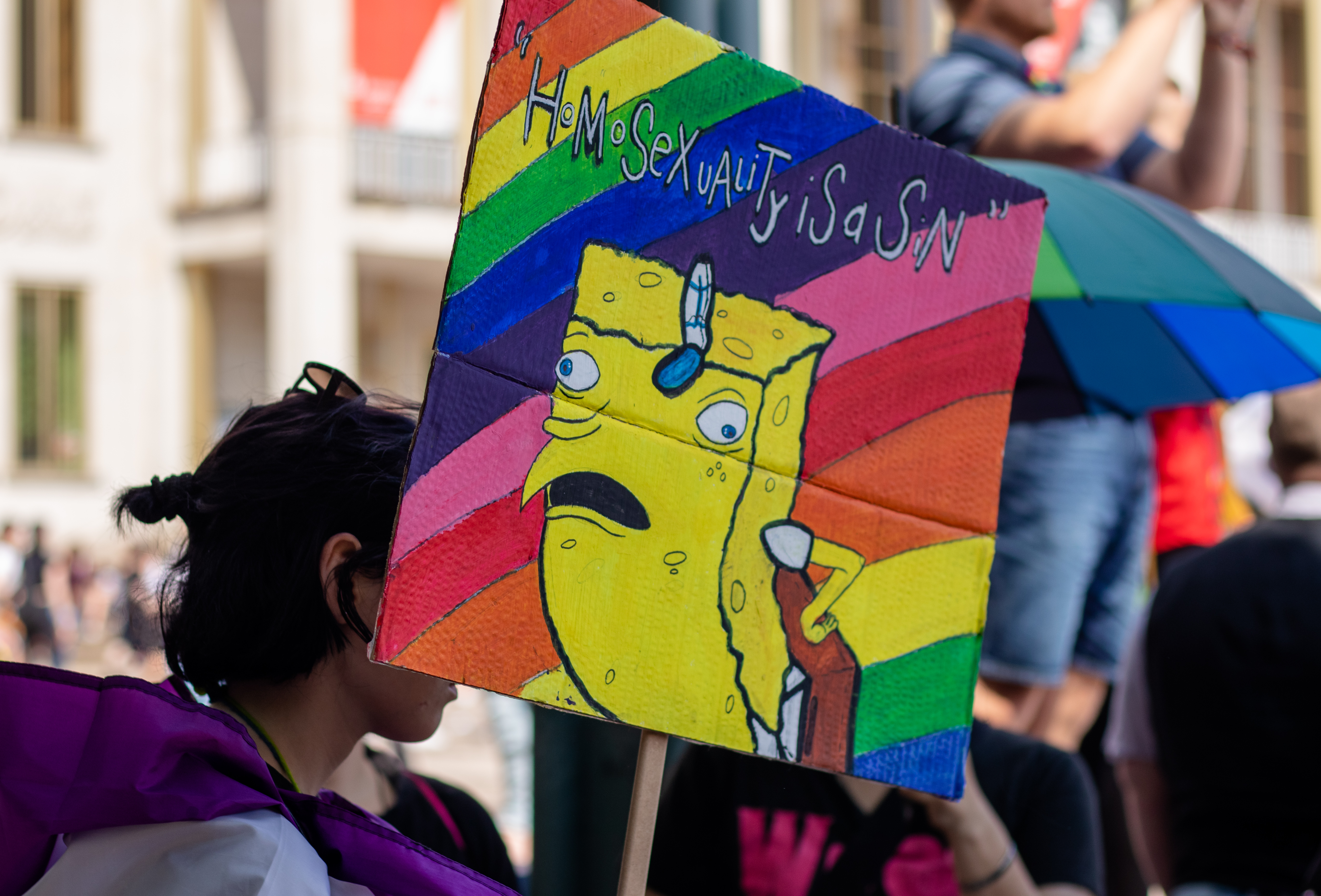
Alternating caps are used on this Mocking SpongeBob meme to mock anti-queer opinions.

Alternating caps are typically used to display mockery in text messages.

The randomized capitalization leads to the flow of words being broken, making it harder for the text to be read as it disrupts word identification even when the size of the letters is the same as in uppercase or lowercase.

Unlike the use of all-lowercase letters, alternating caps requires additional effort to type, either by holding and releasing the shift key with one hand while hunting-and-pecking, by intermittently pressing one shift key or the other while touch typing, or by using an online tool to convert existing text.

== See also ==
- Camel case
- All caps
