= Weltita =

Song by Bad Bunny and Chuwi

from the album Debí Tirar Más Fotos
- Language: Spanish
- Released: January 5, 2025
- Genre: Tropical music; hip-hop
- Length: 3:08
- Label: Rimas Entertainment
- Songwriters: Benito Antonio Martínez Ocasio; Wilfredo Andarondo Torres; Loren Aldarondo Torres; Wester Aldarondo Torres; Adrián López Soto; Eduardo Cabra; Pau Donés Cirera
- Producers: Big Jay; La Paciencia; Eduardo Cabra; Smash David; Digital Jet

Visualizer
- "Weltita" on YouTube

"Weltita" (stylized as "WELTiTA") is a song by Puerto Rican rapper Bad Bunny and the band Chuwi. It was released on January 5, 2025, through Rimas Entertainment, as part of Bad Bunny's sixth solo studio album Debí Tirar Más Fotos.

== Background and release ==
When Bad Bunny revealed the tracklist for Debí Tirar Más Fotos on January 3, 2025, that's where "Weltita" featuring Chuwi was revealed and included as the fifth track.

== Music and lyrics ==
Musically, "Weltita" is a tropical song with elements of hip hop and rap. The lyrics include this chorus: "Baby te vo'a dar una vuelta por la playita / Te vo'a llenar de besitos la carita / Un día conmigo es lo que tú necesitá' / Sonriendo tú te ves más bonita"

== Visualizer ==
A music visualizer was released on January 5, 2025, amid others for Debí Tirar Más Fotos. The visualizer for "Weltita" chronicles the first colonization of Puerto Rico (1508–1600).

== Charts ==
=== Weekly charts ===
Weekly chart performance for "Weltita"
Chart (2025–2026)	Peak position
Argentina Hot 100 (Billboard)	8
Argentina (CAPIF)	6
Bolivia (Billboard)	4
Bolivia (Monitor Latino)	13
Canada Hot 100 (Billboard)	70
Chile (Monitor Latino)	14
Chile (Billboard)	7
Colombia (Billboard)	7
Costa Rica (Monitor Latino)	15
Costa Rica (FONOTICA)	6
Ecuador (Monitor Latino)	18
Ecuador (Billboard)	7
France (SNEP)	77
Global 200 (Billboard)	12
Greece International (IFPI)	45
Italy (FIMI)	60
Luxembourg (Billboard)	25
Mexico (Billboard)	15
Panama (Monitor Latino)	13
Paraguay (Monitor Latino)	6
Peru (Billboard)	6
Portugal (AFP)	14
Spain (PROMUSICAE)	7
US Billboard Hot 100	32
US Hot Latin Songs (Billboard)	8
US Hot Latin Pop Songs (Billboard)	1
US Hot Latin Rhythm Songs (Billboard)	7
Uruguay Airplay (Monitor Latino)	15
Uruguay Streaming (CUD)	9

=== Year-end charts ===
Year-end chart performance for "Papasito"
Chart (2025)	Position
Argentina Airplay (Monitor Latino)	73
Bolivia Airplay (Monitor Latino)	35
Central America Airplay (Monitor Latino)	69
Chile Airplay (Monitor Latino)	52
US Hot Latin Songs (Billboard)	24

== Certifications ==
Certifications and sales for "Weltita"
Region	Certification	Certified units/sales
France (SNEP)	Gold	100,000^{‡}
Portugal (AFP)	Platinum	25,000^{‡}
Spain (Promusicae)	2× Platinum	200,000^{‡}
^{‡} Sales+streaming figures based on certification alone.
