= La Mudanza =

2025 song by Bad Bunny

Song by Bad Bunny

from the album Debí Tirar Más Fotos
- Released: January 5, 2025
- Recorded: 2024
- Genre: Salsa; rap; spoken word
- Length: 3:11
- Label: Rimas
- Songwriters: Benito Antonio Martínez Ocasio; Luis Amed Irizarry; Marcos Efrain Masis; Jay Anthony Núñez; Roberto Jose Rosado Torres
- Producers: Tainy; La Paciencia; Julito Gastón; Big Jay

Music video
- "LA MuDANZA" on YouTube

"La Mudanza" (stylized as "LA MuDANZA"; transl. "The Move") is a song by Puerto Rican rapper and singer Bad Bunny, serving as the seventeenth and closing track of his sixth studio album, Debí Tirar Más Fotos (2025). A salsa track drawing from the salsa dura era of the genre, the song is both a personal tribute to Bad Bunny's family heritage and a political statement about the Puerto Rican independence movement and the effects of gentrification in Puerto Rico. A music video directed by Bad Bunny and Janthony Oliveras was released on March 11, 2025, coinciding with Bad Bunny's 31st birthday, and was noted for its extensive references to Puerto Rican pro-independence history. The song won Best Urban Song at the 26th Annual Latin Grammy Awards in November 2025.

== Background and composition ==
"La Mudanza," meaning "The Move," closes Debí Tirar Más Fotos and functions as the album's most overtly political track. The song opens with a spoken-word passage in which Bad Bunny recounts his family's story: his father Benito, nicknamed "Tito," who grew up in Vega Baja, Puerto Rico, as the eldest of six siblings, driving trucks like his father and grandfather despite dreaming of becoming an engineer; and his mother Lysaurie, nicknamed "Lisy," whom his father met while helping a friend move. In an interview with Billboard, Bad Bunny said the first time he performed the song live "it hit me hard because I was talking about my parents and knew my mom was in the audience." In a separate interview with i-D, he said, "There's a story that I always heard about how [my parents] met, that I've known since I was a kid."

Musically, Rolling Stone described it as "a riotous salsa track" that "borrows from the salsa gorda era of the genre." Billboard highlighted its "robust salsa rhythm" and the song's references to Willie Colón, Cultura Profética, and legendary Puerto Rican boxers Tito Trinidad and Miguel Cotto, as well as Pokémon characters Lugia and Ho-Oh. The song contains a sample of Bad Bunny's earlier track "P FKN R" (2020), featuring Kendo Kaponi and Arcángel.

The song's most politically direct lyrics reference the Gag Law (Ley de la Mordaza), a 1948 Puerto Rican law that criminalized the display of the Puerto Rican flag and pro-independence speech: "Aquí mataron gente por sacar la bandera / Por eso es que ahora yo la llevo donde quiera" ("Here, they killed people for raising the flag / That's why I carry it everywhere now"). He also references Eugenio María de Hostos, a central figure in Puerto Rico's early independence movement who died in the Dominican Republic in 1903 and declared he did not want to be buried there until Puerto Rico was free, singing: "Si mañana muero yo espero que nunca olviden mi rostro / Y pongan un tema mío el día que traigan a Hostos" ("If I die tomorrow I hope they never forget my face / And play one of my songs the day they bring back Hostos"). The song closes with Bad Bunny declaring his intention to remain on the island: "De aquí nadie me saca, de aquí yo no me muevo / Dile que esta es mi casa, donde nació mi abuelo" ("No one's kicking me out of here, I'm not going anywhere / Tell them this is my home, where my grandfather was born").

== Music video ==
The music video was directed by Bad Bunny and longtime creative director Janthony Oliveras. It was released on March 11, 2025, coinciding with Bad Bunny's 31st birthday. Rolling Stone published a dedicated analysis of the video's political symbolism three days later.

The video opens with vintage photographs of Bad Bunny's family, followed by a fictionalized recreation of his birth, with his younger brother Bernie Martínez playing their father. The infant Benito is depicted rapping along to the song from a car seat. The video then transitions to overtly political imagery. The most prominent sequence shows Bad Bunny running through a field carrying the original light-blue Puerto Rican flag — associated with the independence movement and traced to the revolutionary flag used during the Grito de Lares revolt of 1867 — while being pursued by men in military clothing, referencing the historical persecution of pro-independence advocates during the Gag Law era (1948–1957). He is aided by fellow Puerto Ricans, representing collective resistance.

Additional symbolism identified by Rolling Stone and other outlets includes a musician wearing a vejigante mask, representing Puerto Rico's African heritage; black-and-white photographs by Ricardo Alcaraz and others depicting the Vieques protests against U.S. Navy occupation; a mural reading "No me quiero ir de aquí" ("I don't want to leave here"), which also served as the name of Bad Bunny's 2025 Puerto Rico concert residency; and closing shots of Puerto Rico's coastlines, including the Punta Higüero lighthouse in Rincón. Rolling Stone connected the coastal imagery to ongoing debate over the "Esencia" development project in Cabo Rojo, a proposed 2,000-acre luxury development backed by the Mandarin Oriental Hotel Group that critics say threatens public beach access.

Billboard named the "La Mudanza" video as one of Bad Bunny's key creative achievements of 2025 in its year-end profile naming him the No. 1 Greatest Pop Star of 2025.

== Reception ==
Rolling Stone's Maya Georgi, in her five-star album review, noted that "Bad Bunny closes out the album with his most political act" on "La Mudanza," where "he declares he's staying in Puerto Rico forever — a defiant statement at a time when corruption on the island is pushing more and more natives out." Metal Magazine called the song "a love letter, a battle cry, and a historical lesson all in one." The Christian Century published an essay ahead of Super Bowl LX describing the song as a spiritual experience for diaspora Puerto Ricans, with the author writing that hearing Bad Bunny perform it during his San Juan residency on the anniversary of Hurricane Maria was "the closest I've come to being in church outside of an actual Sunday service."

Pasquines, a Puerto Rican news outlet, published a dedicated essay on the song as part of a pre-Super Bowl series, describing it as "not just a song" but "identity" and "recognition" — "the loudest way to say: you can move away, but Puerto Rico never moves out of you."

At the 26th Annual Latin Grammy Awards on November 13, 2025, "La Mudanza" won Best Urban Song. In his acceptance speech, Bad Bunny said: "I seriously never practice speeches because I never think I will win. I'd like y'all to hug the person next to you. It's about giving each other love and enjoying moments like these."

Like the rest of the tracks on Debí Tirar Más Fotos, "La Mudanza" debuted at number 95 on the US Billboard Hot 100, on the issue dated January 18, 2025. On the same issue, the track debuted at number 20 on the US Hot Latin Songs chart. The song later peaked at numbers 51 and 15 on both respective charts. It also received a platinum certification in Spain by Productores de Música de España (PROMUSICAE).

== Charts ==
Chart performance for "La Mudanza"
Chart (2025–2026)	Peak position
Argentina Hot 100 (Billboard)	65
Bolivia (Billboard)	25
Canada Hot 100 (Billboard)	76
Colombia (Billboard)	25
Ecuador (Billboard)	17
France (SNEP)	106
Global 200 (Billboard)	34
Greece International (IFPI)	25
Italy (FIMI)	84
Peru (Billboard)	22
Portugal (AFP)	13
Spain (Promusicae)	16
US Billboard Hot 100	51
US Hot Latin Songs (Billboard)	15
US Hot Tropical Songs (Billboard)	2
US Tropical Airplay (Billboard)	12

== Certifications ==
Certifications and sales for "La Mudanza"
Region	Certification	Certified units/sales
France (SNEP)	Gold	100,000^{‡}
Portugal (AFP)	Gold	12,000^{‡}
Spain (Promusicae)	Platinum	100,000^{‡}
^{‡} Sales+streaming figures based on certification alone.
