= Perfumito Nuevo =

Song by Bad Bunny and RaiNao

from the album Debí Tirar Más Fotos
- Language: Spanish
- English title: "New Perfume"
- Released: January 5, 2025
- Genre: Reggaeton; synth-pop
- Length: 3:21
- Label: Rimas
- Songwriters: Benito Antonio Martínez Ocasio; Naomi Ramírez Rivera; Marco Masís
- Producers: Tainy; La Paciencia; Richi López

Visualizer
- "Perfumito Nuevo" on YouTube

"Perfumito Nuevo" (stylized as "PERFuMITO NUEVO"; transl. "New Perfume") is a song by Puerto Rican rapper Bad Bunny featuring RaiNao. It was released on January 5, 2025, through Rimas Entertainment, as part of Bad Bunny's sixth solo studio album Debí Tirar Más Fotos.

== Background and release ==
On January 3, 2025, when Bad Bunny revealed the tracklist and collaborations for Debí Tirar Más Fotos, is where the song "Perfumito Nuevo" featuring RaiNao was revealed as the fourth track.

== Music and lyrics ==
Musically, "Perfumito Nuevo" is a reggaeton and synth-pop song. Lirically, "Perfumito Nuevo" celebrates seduction and desire in an atmosphere of mystery and novelty. The lyrics speak of the search for something new and exciting, symbolized by the 'new perfume' which represents both the literal scent and the attraction of a new connection.

== Visualizer ==
A visualizer was uploaded along with the rest of the album's songs simultaneously on January 5, 2025. The text in the visualizer for "Perfumito Nuevo" recounts the history of Puerto Rico from the U.S. invasion of 1898 to 1917, when the U.S. Congress granted Puerto Ricans U.S. citizenship.

== Charts ==
=== Weekly charts ===
Weekly chart performance for "Perfumito Nuevo"
Chart (2025–2026)	Peak position
Argentina Hot 100 (Billboard)	29
Bolivia (Billboard)	11
Canada Hot 100 (Billboard)	85
Chile (Billboard)	10
Colombia (Billboard)	12
Costa Rica (FONOTICA)	8
Ecuador (Billboard)	9
France (SNEP)	87
Global 200 (Billboard)	14
Greece International (IFPI)	72
Italy (FIMI)	67
Mexico (Billboard)	18
Peru (Billboard)	10
Portugal (AFP)	19
Spain (PROMUSICAE)	6
US Billboard Hot 100	31
US Hot Latin Songs (Billboard)	7
US Hot Latin Rhythm Songs (Billboard)	6

=== Year-end charts ===
Year-end chart performance for "Perfumito Nuevo"
Chart (2025)	Position
US Hot Latin Songs (Billboard)	31

== Certifications ==
Certifications for "Perfumito Nuevo"
Region	Certification	Certified units/sales
Portugal (AFP)	Gold	12,000^{‡}
Spain (Promusicae)	Platinum	60,000^{‡}
^{‡} Sales+streaming figures based on certification alone.
