= Voy a Llevarte Pa' PR =

Song by Bad Bunny

from the album Debí Tirar Más Fotos
- Language: Spanish
- English title: "I'm Going to Take You to PR"
- Released: January 5, 2025
- Genre: Reggaeton
- Length: 2:36
- Label: Rimas
- Lyricist: Benito Antonio Martínez Ocasio
- Producers: Tainy; Dysbit; La Paciencia

Visualizer
- "Voy a Llevarte Pa' PR" on YouTube

"Voy a Llevarte Pa' PR" (stylized as "VOY A LLeVARTE PA PR"; transl. "I'm Going to Take You to PR") is a song by Puerto Rican rapper Bad Bunny. It was released on January 5, 2025, with his sixth solo studio album Debí Tirar Más Fotos.

== Background and release ==
On January 3, 2025, when the singer revealed the track listing for his new album, Debí Tirar Más Fotos, the song was revealed as the second track.

== Music and lyrics ==
Musically, "Voy a Llevarte Pa' PR" is a reggaeton song. Lyrically, "Voy a Llevarte Pa' PR" emerges as a celebration of Puerto Rico's roots and wild nightlife. In addition, in the song, he also mentions the Spanish singer Rosalía.

== Visualizer ==
The audio visualizer was released along with the other songs and their respective visualizers upon the album's release on January 5, 2025. The visualizer for "Voy a Llevarte Pa' PR" narrates the war after the war (1898-1899).

== Live performances ==
Bad Bunny performed this song at his Super Bowl halftime show.

== Charts ==
=== Weekly charts ===
Weekly chart performance for "Voy a Llevarte Pa' PR"
Chart (2025–2026)	Peak position
Argentina Hot 100 (Billboard)	7
Argentina (CAPIF)	8
Australia (ARIA)	88
Bolivia (Billboard)	4
Canada Hot 100 (Billboard)	20
Chile (Billboard)	2
Chile (Monitor Latino)	14
Colombia (Billboard)	3
Costa Rica (Monitor Latino)	18
Costa Rica (FONOTICA)	6
Ecuador (Billboard)	4
France (SNEP)	32
Germany (GfK)	41
Global 200 (Billboard)	8
Greece International (IFPI)	7
Honduras (Monitor Latino)	12
Italy (FIMI)	22
Latin America (Monitor Latino)	9
Lithuania (AGATA)	29
Luxembourg (Billboard)	11
Mexico (Billboard)	13
New Zealand Hot Singles (RMNZ)	20
Peru (Billboard)	2
Portugal (AFP)	6
Slovakia Singles Digital (ČNS IFPI)	66
Spain (PROMUSICAE)	4
Sweden (Sverigetopplistan)	65
Switzerland (Schweizer Hitparade)	68
UK Indie (Official Charts)	19
US Billboard Hot 100	14
US Hot Latin Rhythm Songs (Billboard)	4
US Hot Latin Songs (Billboard)	3
US Rhythmic Airplay (Billboard)	23
Uruguay (CUD)	6

=== Year-end charts ===
Year-end chart performance for "Voy a Llevarte Pa' PR"
Chart (2025)	Position
Bolivia Airplay (Monitor Latino)	87
Central America Airplay (Monitor Latino)	91
Chile Airplay (Monitor Latino)	74
Global 200 (Billboard)	72
Italy (FIMI)	78
US Hot Latin Songs (Billboard)	9

== Certifications ==
Certifications and sales for "Voy a Llevarte Pa' PR"
Region	Certification	Certified units/sales
France (SNEP)	Platinum	200,000^{‡}
Italy (FIMI)	Platinum	200,000^{‡}
Portugal (AFP)	2× Platinum	50,000^{‡}
Spain (Promusicae)	4× Platinum	400,000^{‡}
Streaming
Greece (IFPI Greece)	Gold	1,000,000^{†}
^{‡} Sales+streaming figures based on certification alone.^{†} Streaming-only figures based on certification alone.
