= Plena =

Genre of music and dance native to Puerto Rico

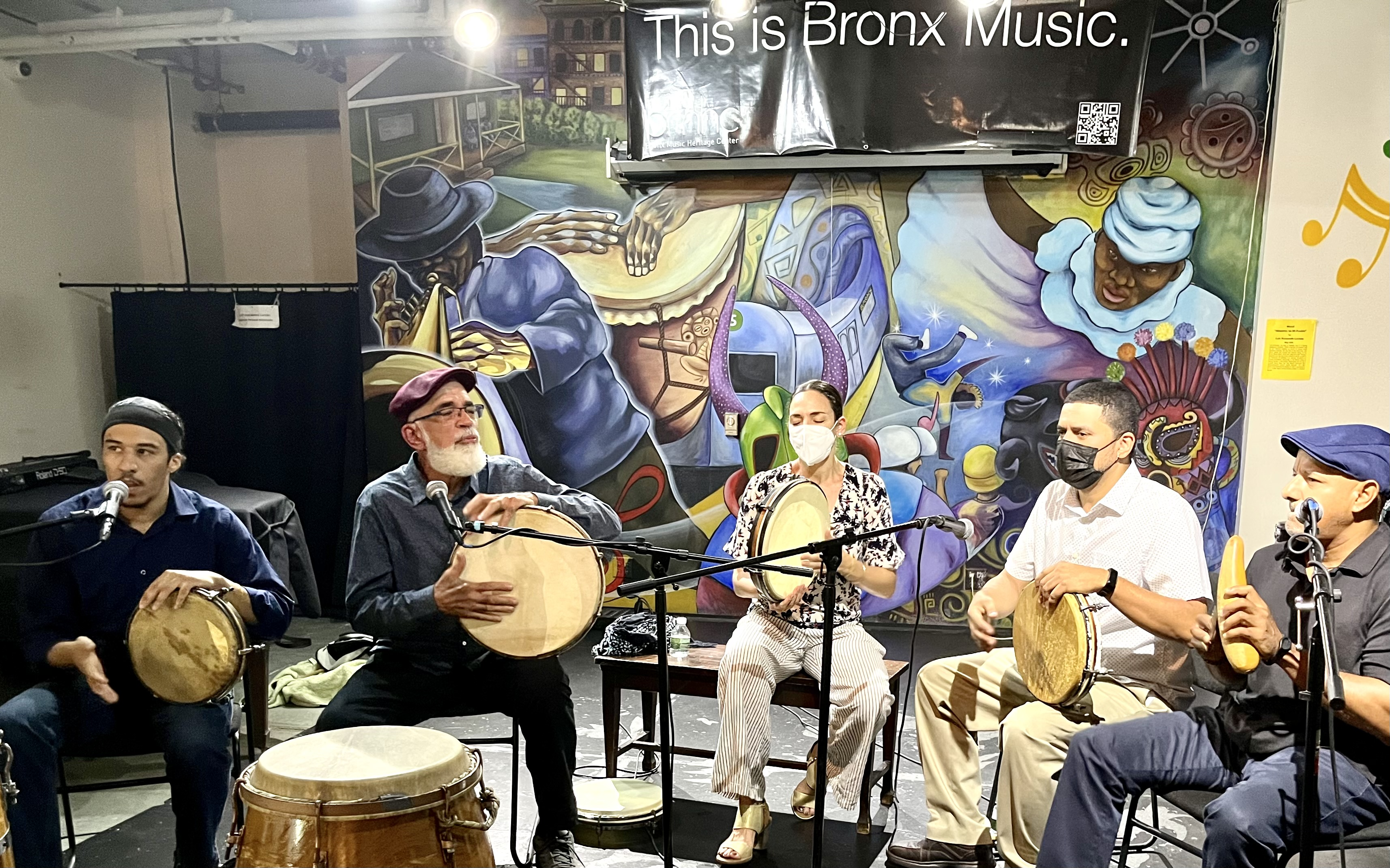
- Plena musicians Los Pleneros de la 21 in 2022
- Stylistic origins: Caribbean
- Cultural origins: Puerto Rico

Other topics
- Music of Puerto Rico

Plena is a genre of music and dance native to Puerto Rico. First played by Afro–Puerto Ricans, the genre has African roots.

== Origins ==
The plena genre originated in Barrio San Antón, Ponce, Puerto Rico, around 1900. It was influenced by the bomba style of music. Originally, sung texts were not associated with the plena, which was rendered by guitar, accordion and pandero, but eventually, in 1907, singing was added. Plena was often called the periodico cantado or "sung newspaper" for the lower classes because it spread messages among people.

== History ==
The plena was a result of the mixing of the culturally diverse popular class, where their workplace, neighborhood, and life experiences met to create an expressive, satirical style of music. It became a way for the working class to gain empowerment through parody. Due to originating in the lower social class, it was regarded by the upper class as "a menace to public order and private property" and was for many years associated with people of la vida alegre (the merry life), referring to prostitutes, dancers, alcoholics, and moral degenerates. Singing and dancing of the plena often happened in cafetines, bars that frequently doubled as brothels and where interracial socializing and sexual encounters were free to take place.

According to singers discussing the use of the plena, they stated it was song with lyrics that related to a current event. For example, if someone drowned or was killed, a plena would be written about it. Tintorera del Mar, Cortaron a Elena, El Obispo de Ponce, and Matan a Bumbum were some plenas which became wildly popular.

The eventual widespread acceptance of the plena can be attributed to the increased number of people joining the workforce, which led to a new demand for public leisure. It was still considered indecent by the upper class, who fought against its rising popularity. In December 1917, an ordinance was passed banning the dances from happening inside the city limits. It took another decade for the plena to gain widespread popularity throughout Puerto Rico and cross racial and cultural boundaries. Listening to plena at home and at neighborhood- or municipal-sanctioned celebrations became acceptable and was no longer considered morally tainted by "respectable" white upper class Ponceños. Eventually, with much whitewashing to make it more palatable to the masses, plena was embraced in earnest as a style of music that united Puerto Ricans. However, with the acceptance of the upper class, what began as a vitally important cultural identifier and personal expression of philosophy, community, and self to the lower class became an entertaining spectacle for the white upper class.

By the 1930s, the plena was accessible to all through the radio and record industries.

== Genre ==
Plena music is generally folkloric in nature. The music's beat and rhythm are usually played using hand drums called panderetas, also known as panderos. The music is accompanied by a scrape gourd, the guiro. Panderetas resemble tambourines but without the jingles. These are handheld drums with stretched animal skins, usually goat skin, covering a round wooden frame. Three different sizes of pandereta are used in plena: the Seguidor (the largest of the three), the Punteador (the medium-sized drum), and the requinto. An advantage of this percussion arrangement is its portability, contributing to the plena's spontaneous appearance at social gatherings. Other instruments commonly heard in plena music are the cuatro, the maracas, and accordions.

The fundamental melody of the plena, as in all regional Puerto Rican music, has a decided Spanish strain; it is marked in the resemblance between the plena Santa María and a song composed in the Middle Ages by Alfonso the Wise, King of Spain. The lyrics of plena songs are usually octosyllabic and assonant. Following the universal custom the theme touches upon all phases of life—romance, politics, and current events. Generally, anything which appeals to the imagination of the people, such as the arrival of a personage, a crime, a bank moratorium, or a hurricane, can be the subject of plena music.

== Spread ==
Plena is played throughout Puerto Rico especially during special occasions such as the Christmas season, and as the musical backdrop for civic protests, due to its traditional use as a vehicle for social commentary. When plena is played the audience often joins in the singing, clapping, and dancing. Plena is also enjoyed by the Puerto Rican diaspora outside of Puerto Rico. Pleneros de la 21, for example, traveled to Hawaii to perform for the Puerto Rican diaspora there which include descendants of Puerto Ricans who immigrated to Hawaii from Puerto Rico in the early 20th century.

Since 2025, plena music has been in the spotlight with the release of Bad Bunny's album DeBÍ TiRAR MáS FOToS where he collaborated with plena musical groups like Los Pleneros de la Cresta.

== Composers ==
As a folk genre, there have been many good composers, some well known in their day and into the present. Perhaps one of the genre's most celebrated composers and performers was Manuel Jiménez, known as 'El Canario'. Certainly, there were many others, including such greats as Ramito, Ismael Rivera, Mon Rivera (the junior), and Rafael Cortijo. In 2006, Tito Matos and Los Pleneros de la 21 received a Grammy nomination for their Para Todos Ustedes plena songs recording.

The genre has had a revival recently, as evident by the emergence of many plena bands (such as Plena Libre, Viento de agua and others) and its use in various songs, such as Ricky Martin's song "Pégate" and Ivy Queen's "Vamos A Celebrar".

In 1953, Puerto Rican writer, Luis Palés Matos wrote Plena del Menéalo urging the Puerto Rican woman to move it and ends the plena with the line ¡Para que rabie el Tio Sam (to make "Uncle Sam" angry).

== See also ==
- List of Puerto Ricans
- Music of Puerto Rico

== Sources ==
- Aparicio, Frances R., "Listening to salsa: gender, Latin popular music, and Puerto Rican cultures", Wesleyan University Press, 1998. ISBN 978-0-8195-6308-8. Cf. Chapter Two: A Sensual Mulatta Called the Plena, pp. 27–44.
- "Portfolio: Plena, oversized folder: 47. Archives of the Puerto Rican Diaspora Poster Collection, MSS-327". Archives of the Puerto Rican Diaspora.
