= Tego Calderón discography =

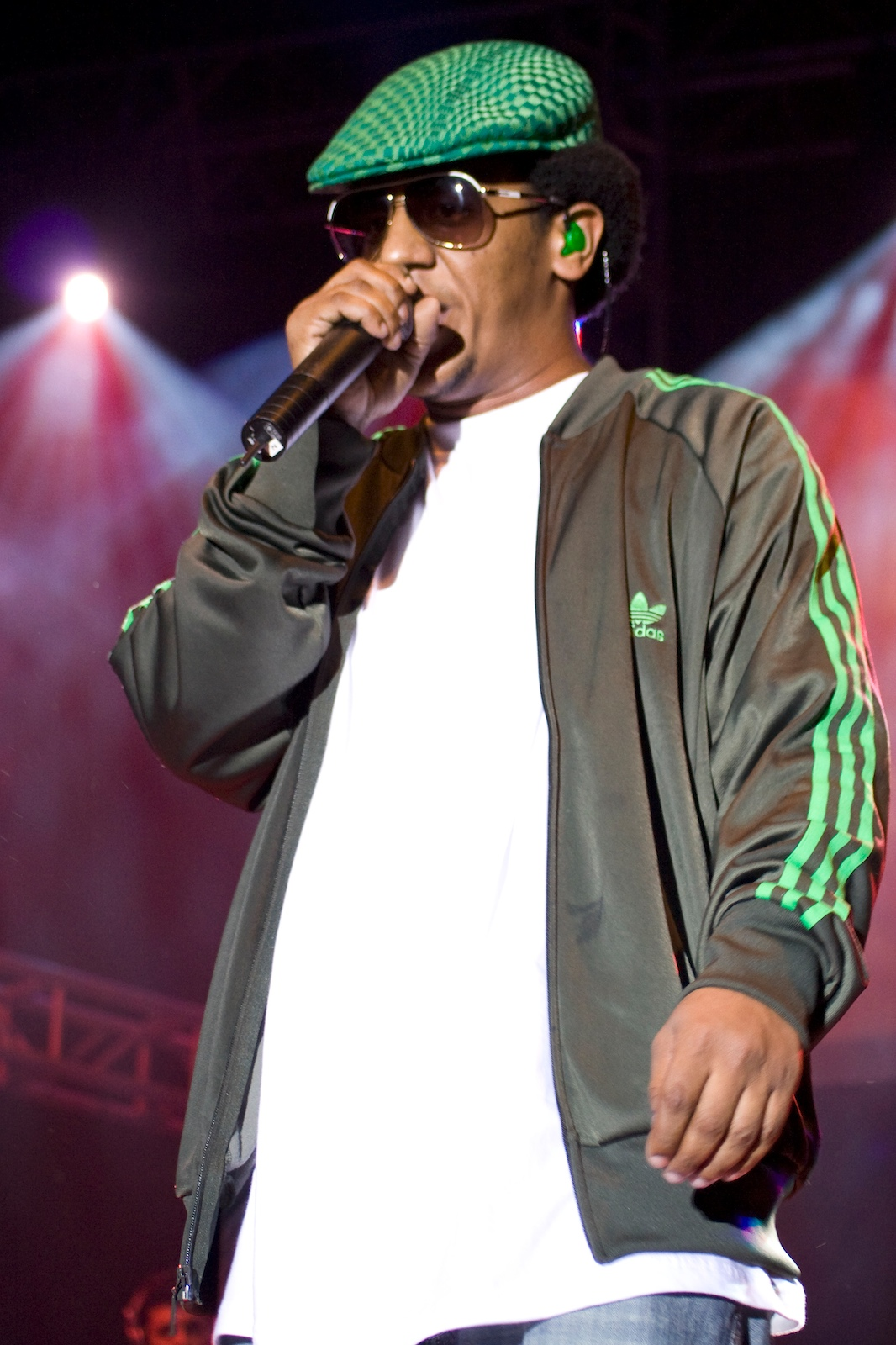
- Calderón performing in the Canary Islands, September 2007.
- Studio albums: 4
- Compilation albums: 1
- Singles: 15
- Featured singles: 11
- Mixtapes: 1

Puerto Rican rapper Tego Calderón has released four studio albums, one compilation album, one mixtape albums, and fifteen singles.

On November 1, 2002, Tego released his debut album El Abayarde including the singles "Abayarde", "Pa' Que Retozen", "Cambumbo", "Guasa Guasa" and "Al Natural".

His second album The Underdog/El Subestimado was released on August 29, 2006. The album had four singles: "Los Maté", "Chillin'", "Cuando Baila Reggaeton" and "Llora, Llora".

Tego released his third studio album, El Abayarde Contraataca, in 2007, featuring the singles "Tradicional A Lo Bravo", "Quitarte To'" and "Ni Fu Ni Fa".

As of 2012, Tego is set to release his fourth studio album, El Que Sabe, Sabe, which features the single "Pegaito a la Pared".

== Albums ==
=== Studio ===
Title	Album details	Peak chart positions				
Title	Album details	US	US Latin	US Latin Rhythm	US Rap	US Latin Pop
El Abayarde	Released: November 1, 2002; Label: White Lion, BMG U.S. Latin	—	17	—	—	11
The Underdog/El Subestimado	Released: August 29, 2006; Label: Jiggiri, Atlantic	43	2	1	10	—
El Abayarde Contraataca	Released: August 29, 2007; Label: Jiggiri, Warner Latina	136	6	1	21	—
El Que Sabe, Sabe	Released: February 3, 2015; Label: Jiggiri, Siente, Universal Latino	—	2	1	19	—
"—" denotes a recording that did not chart or was not released in that territory.

=== Mixtapes and compilations ===
Title	Album details	Peak chart positions				
Title	Album details	US Latin	US Latin Rhythm	US Rap	US Latin Pop	US Tropical
El Enemy de los Guasíbiri	Released: January 13, 2004; Label: Jiggiri, White Lion, BMG U.S. Latin	5	—	—	4	9
The Original Gallo del País	Released: June 19, 2012; Label: Jiggiri	64	3	—	—	—
"—" denotes a recording that did not chart or was not released in that territory.

== Singles ==
=== Solo ===
Title	Year	Peak chart positions		Album(s)
Title	Year	US Latin	US Tropical	Album(s)
"Abayarde"	2002	—	—	El Abayarde
"Pa' Que Retozen"	2003	—	36	El Abayarde
"Cambumbo"	2003	—	—	El Abayarde
"Masucamba"	2003	48	4	El Abayarde
"Guasa Guasa"	2003	—	—	El Abayarde
"Al Natural"	2003	—	—	El Abayarde
"Punto y Aparte"	2004	—	13	12 Discípulos
"Dominicana"	2005	—	29	El Abayarde
"Los Maté"	2006	11	26	The Underdog/El Subestimado
"Chillin' (feat. Don Omar)	2006	44	8	The Underdog/El Subestimado
"Cuando Baila Reggaeton" (feat. Yandel)	2007	33	37	The Underdog/El Subestimado
"Llora, Llora" (feat. Oscar D'León)	2007	—	—	The Underdog/El Subestimado
"Tradicional A Lo Bravo"	2007	45	13	El Abayarde Contraataca
"Quitarte To'" (feat. Randy)	2007	10	17	El Abayarde Contraataca
"Ni Fu Ni Fa"	2008	—	—	El Abayarde Contraataca
"Pegaito a la Pared"	2008	18	—	Non-album single
"Dando Break"	2014	—	—	El Que Sabe, Sabe
"Sexy Sicá"	2015	—	—	Non-album single
"No Pasa de Moda"	2016	—	—	Non-album single
"Chambean" (with Cosculluela)	2022	—	—	Non-album single
"La Receta"	2023	—	—	Non-album single
"—" denotes a recording that did not chart or was not released in that territory.

=== Featured ===
Title	Year	Peak chart positions					Album(s)
Title	Year	US Latin	US Latin Airplay	US Latin Digital	US Latin Rhythm Airplay	US Tropical	Album(s)
"Amor Amor" (with Roselyn Sánchez)	2003	38	38	—	—	6	Borinqueña
"Amigo Mío" (with Toño Rosario)	2004	44	44	—	—	2	El Enemy de los Guasíbiri
"Los 12 Discípulos" (with Eddie Dee, Gallego, Vico C, Julio Voltio, Daddy Yankee, Ivy Queen, Zion & Lennox, Nicky Jam, Johnny Prez and Wiso G)	2004	—	—	—	—	8	12 Discípulos
"Bandoleros" (with Don Omar)	2005	18	18	8	10	12	Los Bandoleros
"Fuego" (with Yaga & Mackie)	2005	—	—	—	—	24	La Moda
"Julito Maraña" (with Julio Voltio)	2005	—	31	—	—	—	Voltio
"No Quiere Novio (Remix)" (with Ñejo)	2006	41	31	—	13	15	
"Calentura" (with ChocQuibTown and Zully Murillo)	2011	—	—	—	21	—	Eso Es Lo Que Hay
"Zapatito Roto" (with Plan B)	2013	30	24	48	5	30	Love & Sex
"Trust" (with Romeo Santos)	2014	—	—	19	—	—	Formula, Vol. 2
"—" denotes a recording that did not chart or was not released in that territory.

=== Collaborations / remixes ===
- "Amor, Amor" (Roselyn Sánchez feat. Tego Calderón)
- "Al Natural (Remix)" (Tego Calderón feat. Yandel)
- "Oye Mi Canto" (N.O.R.E. feat. Nina Sky, Tego Calderón, Gem Star & Big Mato)
- "Yeah (Usher feat. Lil Jon, Ludacris & Tego Calderón)
- "Sin Exagerar" (Calle 13 feat. Tego Calderon)
- "Se Van" (Julio Voltio feat. Tego Calderón)
- "Mirame (Remix)" (Daddy Yankee feat. Tego Calderón & Deevanee)
- "Lean Back" (Terror Squad feat. Tego Calderón)
- "La Calle Me Lo Pidió" (Wisin & Yandel feat. Tego Calderon)
- "Quítate Tú Pa' Ponerme Yo" (Eddie Dee feat. Gallego, Vico C, Tego Calderón, Julio Voltio, Zion & Lennox, Daddy Yankee, Ivy Queen, Johnny Prez, Nicky Jam, & Wiso G)
- "Quítate Tú Pa' Ponerme Yo (Salsa)" (Eddie Dee feat. Gallego, Vico C, Tego Calderón, Julio Voltio, Zion & Lennox, Daddy Yankee, Ivy Queen, Johnny Prez, Nicky Jam, & Wiso G)
- "Bandoleros" (Don Omar feat. Tego Calderón)
- "I Wanna Love You (Akon feat. Snoop Dogg & Tego Calderón)
- "Ghetto (Remix)" (Akon feat. Tego Calderón)
- "We Got The Crown" (Aventura feat. Tego Calderón)
- "Vamonos Al Club" (Zion feat. Tego Calderón)
- "Pegaito a la Pared (Remix)" (Tego Calderón feat. Plan B)
- "Che Che Cole" & "El Amor Es Un Casino" (Víctor Manuelle feat. Tego Calderón)
- "Conexión Puerto Rico" (Cartel de Santa feat. Tego Calderón)
- "La Muralla (Puya feat. Tito Auger, Tego Calderón, Mimi Maura & El Topo)
- "Zun Zun Rompiendo Caderas (Remix)" (Wisin & Yandel feat. Pitbull & Tego Calderón)
- "Es Un Secreto (Remix)" (Plan B feat. Tego Calderón & Akon)
- "Original G's (Ñengo Flow feat. Tego Calderón)
- "Zapatito Roto" (Plan B feat. Tego Calderón)
- "Quiero Hacertelo (J Alvarez feat. Tego Calderón)
- "Las Nenas Lindas" (Remix) (Jowell & Randy feat. Tego Calderón)
- "Punkie" (Remix) (Sean Paul feat. Tego Calderón)
