= Pegaito a la Pared =

- Pegaito a la Pared" Single cover

Single by Tego Calderón
- Released: November 1, 2008
- Recorded: 2008
- Genre: Reggaeton
- Length: 3:53
- Label: Jiggiri Records
- Songwriter: Tegui Calderon
- Producer: Nely "El Arma Secreta"

Tego Calderón singles chronology
"Ni Fu Ni Fa" (2008)	"Pegaito a la Pared" (2008)	"Pegaito a la Pared (Remix)" (2009)

"Pegaito a la Pared (Remix)"
- Pegaito a la Pared" Single cover

Single by Tego Calderón featuring Plan B

from the album El Que Sabe, Sabe
- Released: February 3, 2009
- Genre: Latin music
- Length: 4:42
- Label: Jiggiri Records
- Songwriter: Tegui Calderon
- Producer: Nely "El Arma Secreta"

Tego Calderón singles chronology
"Pegaito a la Pared" (2008)	"Pegaito a la Pared (Remix)" (2009)	"Es un Secreto (Remix)" (2011)

Plan B singles chronology
"Me Arrepiento" (2007)	"Pegaito a la Pared (Remix)" (2009)	"Si No Le Contesto" (2010)

"Pegaito a la Pared" is the first single by Puerto Rican reggaeton performer Tego Calderón from his upcoming fifth album El Que Sabe, Sabe. It was released on iTunes on November 1, 2008 through Jiggiri Records. The single is produced by Nely "El Arma Secreta". An official remix with Plan B was released on February 3, 2009. The remix is also available on iTunes. "No Se Ve" was the first version to reach the charts, debuting at # 20, and peaking at # 18. During Summer 2009, the original version of Pegaito a la Pared reached the Latin Rhythm Airplay charts debuting at # 23. An instrumental version of the song was released on iTunes.

== Background ==
"Pegaito a la Pared" and its remix are the first singles for Tego's upcoming album El Que Sabe, Sabe. The lyrical theme of the song is like old school reggaeton music, although the song has new music quality. Having old school lyrics, Tego featured Plan B for the songs remix, a Puerto Rican duo that makes old school reggaeton up to this day. Tego Calderón said that he doesn't like how the genre of reggaeton is changing too much to pop, so he decided to go away from reggaeton a little, and bring more of a dancehall, reggae and different kind of urban sounds than reggaeton, and still make his album a bomb. That's one of the reasons that Tego Calderón sings more and raps less in this song.

== Remix and other official versions ==
- The original version includes Tego Calderón only.
- The official remix has Plan B added with the original beat.
- A reggaeton beat (Dembow) was added to a Reggaeton Mix to the original version which appears on the remixes single on iTunes.
- There is another version of the remix which also features Plan B only with a different beat which was produced by Nely "El Arma Secreta" titled "No Se Ve".
- "No Se Ve" has a remix featuring Poeta Callejero.
- DJ Giann released an instrumental single of "Pegaito a la Pared" on iTunes.

== Track listings and formats ==
Digital download single

1. "Pegaito a la Pared" - 3:53

Pegaito a la Pared "The Remixes" Digital download ep

1. "Pegaito a la Pared (Reggaeton Mix)" - 3:56
2. "Pegaito a la Pared (remix) (feat. Plan B)" - 4:42
3. "Pegaito a la Pared (remix) (feat. Plan B, Franco "El Gorila", Adrian Banton, Jowell & Ñejo)- 5:37

Tego Pegaito a la Pared Instrumental Digital download single

1. "Tego Pegaito a la Pared Instrumental" - 3:59

== Charts ==
"No Se Ve" was the first version of "Pegaito a la Pared" to appear on the charts, and appeared on the Latin Rhythm Airplay chart. Since then, it has jumped around going higher and lower. It debuted at number 23 and peaked at number 18.

The second version to reach the chart was the original version of "Pegaito a la Pared". It recently reached the charts, and debuted at # 23. It's currently peaking at #22.

== Chart performance ==
=== No Se Ve ===
Chart (2009)	Peak position
Latin Rhythm Airplay	18

=== Pegaito a la Pared ===
Chart (2009)	Peak position
Latin Rhythm Airplay	22
