= Super Bowl LX halftime show =

Event during the 2026 Super Bowl

- Part of: Super Bowl LX
- Date: February 8, 2026
- Location: Santa Clara, California, U.S.
- Venue: Levi's Stadium
- Headliner: Bad Bunny
- Special guests: Lady Gaga; Ricky Martin; Los Pleneros de la Cresta
- Sponsor: Apple Music
- Director: Hamish Hamilton
- Producer: Jesse Collins; Roc Nation

Super Bowl halftime show chronology
LIX (2025)	LX (2026)	LXI (2027)

The Super Bowl LX halftime show, officially known as the Apple Music Super Bowl LX Halftime Show for sponsorship purposes, was the halftime entertainment of Super Bowl LX, which took place on February 8, 2026, at Levi's Stadium in Santa Clara, California, United States. It was headlined by Bad Bunny and featured guest appearances from Lady Gaga, Ricky Martin, and Los Pleneros de la Cresta. The performance marked the first time a Latino solo artist headlined the Super Bowl halftime show and the first halftime set performed almost entirely in Spanish.

The show was broadcast across the US on NBC, Peacock, Telemundo, Universo, NFL+ and select NBC Sports digital platforms. It drew 128.2 million viewers domestically across all platforms—making it the fourth-most-watched halftime show in history—and attracted 4.8 million viewers on Telemundo, the network's largest audience for an American football broadcast. It was met with widespread critical acclaim, with critics praising the performance, production, tone, and themes. Analysts highlighted the show's social commentary on Puerto Rico's history, its pan-Latino cultural affirmation, and its recontextualization of the terms America and American to encompass the entire continent.

== Synopsis ==
"Super Bowl LX Halftime Show" (Live)

Promotional single by Bad Bunny

from the EP Super Bowl LX Live from Santa Clara, CA
- Language: Spanish; English
- Released: February 8, 2026
- Recorded: February 8, 2026
- Venue: Levi's Stadium
- Length: 13:41
- Label: NFL
- Songwriter: Benito Antonio Martínez Ocasio

Bad Bunny promotional singles chronology
"De Museo" (2021)	"Super Bowl LX Halftime Show" (Live) (2026)

Performance video
- Bad Bunny's Apple Music Super Bowl Halftime Show on YouTube

For the halftime show, part of the stadium was transformed into a sugarcane field. Yellow Studio's Julio Himede, part of the creative team behind the show, said that they divided the stage into various smaller sections to accommodate the "vignettes" that Bad Bunny would walk through as he told the story of "real people in everyday life that are celebrating the Latin community". The show featured more than 300 dancers and multiple moving stages, along with an actual wedding. The set consisted of multiple odes to Puerto Rican and overall Latin American everyday life, with the rapper interacting with old men playing dominoes, a jeweler, and more, as well with food stands of coconut, piraguas, and tacos.

Lady Gaga and Puerto Rican singer Ricky Martin were featured as guest singers during the performance. Gaga performed a salsa version of "Die with a Smile" (2024) backed by the salsa band Los Sobrinos, with an arrangement by Big Jay. A couple, who had previously invited Bad Bunny to attend their wedding, was legally married on stage during the performance. Bad Bunny signed the marriage certificate as a legal witness. Meanwhile, Martin made his Super Bowl debut by singing a rendition of "Lo Que Le Pasó a Hawaii", a song addressing gentrification in Puerto Rico by drawing a comparison to the historical experience of Hawaii. The "Mónaco" orchestral segment was conducted by Giancarlo Guerrero, and during "Café Con Ron", Bad Bunny was backed by Los Pleneros de la Cresta, a plena ensemble.

The performance also saw Bad Bunny give a replica of one of his Grammy Award statues to a child, playing the part of a young Benito Antonio, watching his Grammy Award acceptance speech from the week prior on television with his family in a domestic set, with the rapper encouraging his younger self to "always believe in yourself". While there was speculation that the child was Liam Conejo Ramos, a five-year-old boy detained along with his father by ICE officials in January, it was later revealed to be child actor Lincoln Fox.

The casita portion of the stage included special appearances by Cardi B, Karol G, Young Miko, Jessica Alba, Pedro Pascal, Alix Earle, David Grutman, baseball outfielder Ronald Acuña Jr., and boxers Xander Zayas and Emiliano Vargas. María Antonia Cay, better known as Toñita, owner of the Caribbean Social Club in Little Caribbean, Brooklyn, New York, who is known for refusing to sell her property despite mass gentrification in the Williamsburg area, also appeared during the performance serving Bad Bunny a drink from a bodega during "Nuevayol", in which she is referenced.

== Background ==
On September 9, 2025, it was reported that NFL commissioner Roger Goodell hinted that singer-songwriter Taylor Swift could be the headliner for the halftime show. He said when asked if it is possible that Swift could do the show: "We would always love to have [Swift] play. She is a special, special talent, and obviously she would be welcome at any time". When asked by Today co-host Savannah Guthrie if an appearance from Swift was in the works, Goodell said "I can't tell you anything about it."

It was initially reported that Swift had asked for an appearance fee and full copyrights to the show, which the NFL does not provide to performers. However, Swift later said that she had rejected the possibility during early conversations with Roc Nation because she was unwilling to perform in a game in which her then-fiancé Travis Kelce could be a participant, since it would detract from her enjoyment of the game by having to focus on the details of a concert. Swift's concerns no longer applied after Kelce's team, the Kansas City Chiefs, were eliminated from postseason contention on December 14, 2025. Billboard also speculated that potential headliners included Lady Gaga (who headlined the Super Bowl LI halftime show in 2017), Mariah Carey, Justin Bieber, Drake, BTS, Green Day, Metallica, and Jay-Z.

== Announcement ==
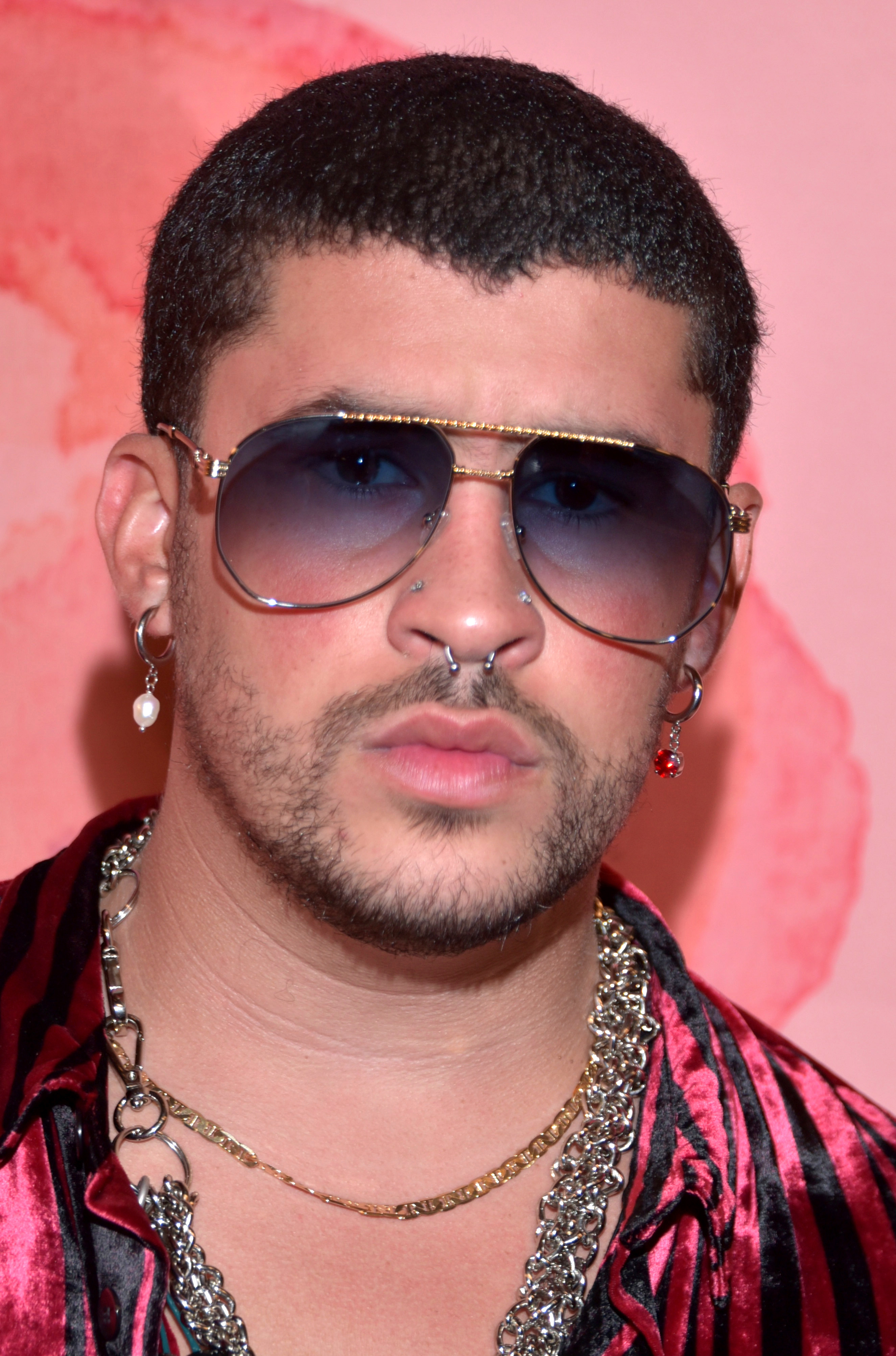
Bad Bunny

Puerto Rican rapper Bad Bunny was officially announced as the headliner for the halftime show on September 28, 2025, by the NFL in partnership with Apple Music and Jay-Z's Roc Nation. Bad Bunny was the first Latino and Spanish-speaking artist to headline the Super Bowl halftime show as a solo act. He previously performed as a special guest at the Super Bowl LIV halftime show, alongside headliners Shakira and Jennifer Lopez.

In a statement, Bad Bunny highlighted the cultural significance of the event, saying, "This is for my people, my culture, and our history." Earlier in the year, Bad Bunny declined to hold concerts in the mainland US and reserved Puerto Rican shows to archipelago and island residents due to concerns over raids executed by the US Immigration and Customs Enforcement (ICE). A day before the announcement, Bad Bunny said, "I've been thinking about it these days, and after discussing it with my team, I think I'll do just one date in the US."

=== NFL Latino audience strategy ===
Bad Bunny's selection came amid the NFL's intensified efforts to grow its Latino fanbase, which the league identified as essential to its expansion strategy. In 2024, NFL Senior Vice President of Global Brand and Consumer Marketing Marissa Solis stated that league growth "is mathematically impossible without Latinos", pointing to over 39 million Latino fans in the US—one of the largest Latino fanbases in American sports. The league's "Por La Cultura" campaign, launched in 2021, represents an ongoing initiative to cultivate Latino audiences through Spanish-language broadcasts, cultural partnerships, and storytelling featuring Latino players.

The selection also reflected the growing economic influence of Latino consumers in the US. A 2025 McKinsey & Company report projected that Latinos would account for one-third of total US sports market growth by 2035. Super Bowl LX featured the broadest Spanish-language broadcast distribution in Super Bowl history, with both Fox Deportes and Telemundo producing separate Spanish-language coverage of the game.

=== Reception to selection ===
Reactions to the announcement were mixed, with most opposition coming from conservative commentators. Many positive responses highlighted the selection as a milestone for Latino representation. California governor Gavin Newsom was "excited" to welcome Bad Bunny to the state, and declared February 8, 2026, as Bad Bunny Day to commemorate the performance. Univision highlighted the pride of the Latino community, while celebrities such as Jennifer Lopez, Bruno Mars, Shakira, Jelly Roll, and Jay‑Z expressed their support. Reports emphasized the economic and cultural impact of his concerts in Puerto Rico. NFL officials stated that Bad Bunny's selection was an important way to be relevant to its growing Latino fanbase, and that it was part of a broader effort to engage the community of over 70 million Latinos in the US.

Conservative influencers and political figures questioned the selection, criticizing Bad Bunny for his opposition to President Donald Trump and ICE. Some critical commentators also noted that Bad Bunny performs primarily in Spanish and had avoided including mainland US dates in his Debí Tirar Más Fotos World Tour due to concerns about potential ICE raids. Trump described the announcement as "absolutely ridiculous". US secretary of homeland security Kristi Noem announced that ICE agents would be present at the Super Bowl. Speaker of the House Mike Johnson opined that choosing Bad Bunny was a "terrible decision" and claimed he did not have broader appeal, suggesting Lee Greenwood as an alternative. Conservative organization Turning Point USA held its own halftime musical performance as counterprogramming, with conservative musician Kid Rock announced as the headliner on February 4, 2026.

Bad Bunny addressed the response during his October Saturday Night Live appearance, where he jokingly told critics they had "four months to learn" Spanish. Goodell dismissed criticism of the selection as typical for an event of its caliber. He praised Bad Bunny as "one of the greatest artists in the world", and rejected calls to change the performers. Jay-Z dismissed the opposition to the selection as astroturfing.

== Development ==
=== Production ===
The production team included Julio Himide as production designer, Harriet Cuddeford as creative and show director, and Puerto Rican art director Mónica Monserrate. Because NFL regulations prohibit motorized vehicles on the field during the halftime show, approximately 380 performers dressed as plants and foliage carried stage elements during transitions between segments. To accommodate the preparation of his performance, the concerts in Santiago and Lima of his Debí Tirar Más Fotos World Tour were rescheduled from their original dates in February, the same week the Super Bowl took place, to mid-January.

=== Fashion ===
Bad Bunny's all-cream wardrobe, primarily designed by Zara, consisted of a collared shirt and tie, a team jersey with his maternal family name Ocasio and the number 64 printed on it, a double-breasted blazer, chinos, and a pair of sneakers he created in collaboration with Adidas. It marked the first time the fast fashion retailer outfitted a performer on this large of a scale; they also dressed his backup dancers, band, and orchestra.

The team jersey served as a tribute to Bad Bunny's maternal uncle Cutito Ocasio (1964–2024), a devoted fan of the San Francisco 49ers who introduced him to the NFL. He dreamt of taking Ocasio to a future Super Bowl game, but he unexpectedly died following the 49ers' loss to the Kansas City Chiefs at Super Bowl LVIII. Among Bad Bunny's accessories were matching cream gloves and a Royal Oak timepiece from Audemars Piguet. Found, a Lahore-based fashion label, designed custom accessories for Bad Bunny that he almost wore for the performance, until Zara won the bid for the complete wardrobe.

Lady Gaga wore a light blue dress adorned with the red flor de maga, the national flower of Puerto Rico, matching the colors of the light blue Puerto Rican flag displayed throughout the performance.

== Political themes ==
The halftime show was widely discussed for its political themes, including the show's definitions of the words "America" and "American" as a continental identity rather than being a term solely for citizens of the US, and support for Latino ethnic consciousness and anti-colonialism in Puerto Rico. For example, scholars Vanessa Díaz and Petra Rivera-Rideau of Rolling Stone highlighted the many symbols of Puerto Rican history and culture displayed during the performance, as well as gestures to the "broader Latino community, and a strong reframing of U.S. notions of what it means to be American".

=== Definitions of the terms "America" and "American" ===
The show defined the English words "America" and "American" as a continental identity, rather than being a term solely used to identify citizens of the US, mirroring the distinction between the Spanish terms "americano" and "estadounidense". During the performance, Bad Bunny spoke in English only one time to say "God bless America", followed by the Spanish filler phrase "o sea" (roughly meaning "that is to say"). He then named more than twenty countries or territories throughout the Americas, specifically Chile, Argentina, Uruguay, Paraguay, Bolivia, Peru, Ecuador, Brazil, Colombia, Venezuela, Guyana, Panama, Costa Rica, Nicaragua, Honduras, El Salvador, Guatemala, Mexico, Cuba, Dominican Republic, Jamaica, Haiti, the Antilles, the United States, Canada, and Puerto Rico, thus positioning the US as only one of many countries and territories in the American continent. Dancers trailed behind him, carrying flags of those nations along with many others in the Caribbean. Bad Bunny concluded by holding up a football inscribed with the words "Together we are America" and said "seguimos aquí" ("we're still here"). The socialist magazine Jacobin interpreted the halftime show as advocating for what it described as a "pan-American nationalism".

=== Latino unity and cultural affirmation ===
Beyond its specific critiques of colonialism, the performance conveyed themes of Latino unity and collective cultural presence. One of the ways the performance showcased unity was at the casita set piece, a replica of a traditional Puerto Rican home used as the B-stage during the No Me Quiero Ir de Aquí concert residency and the Debí Tirar Más Fotos World Tour, featuring Latino celebrities from across entertainment and sports celebrating together as the performance unfolded around them. The show's guest appearances reinforced this theme. Martin, who during the 1999 Latin explosion had crossed over into the US mainstream largely by singing in English, instead performed entirely in Spanish. NPR characterized the moment as Bad Bunny "flipping the traditional Latino crossover". Similarly, Gaga's salsa arrangement of her hit song was described by Time as "a shrewd moment of reverse assimilation", noting that "while conservatives called for Bad Bunny to sing in English, instead he got a major white female pop star to adapt her song into salsa".

Latino community members and business owners across the US expressed pride in the performance. Victor Villa, the owner of Villa's Tacos, the taco truck that appeared during a brief segment of the show, posted on Instagram that it was an "honor" to have participated as a part of the performance, writing that "This one is for all the immigrants who paved the way before us to make this moment possible." Miriam Velez, co-owner of the Puerto Rican-themed social club Pe Erre Domino in Chicago, told CBS News Chicago, "It's about time to recognize our culture, our passion, our people." Yazmin Auli, owner of the Philadelphia bakery El Coquí, added, "I think it doesn't matter that it's Bad Bunny, but that any Latino that goes and represents us in the Super Bowl, we're good."

=== Puerto Rican anti-colonialism ===
Puerto Rico's azul claro flag, which was displayed during the performance, has been adopted by the independence movement in Puerto Rico.

Bad Bunny's song "Lo Que Le Pasó a Hawaii", which draws imperialist, settler colonialist, and colonialist parallels between Puerto Rico and Hawaii under the US sovereignty, was performed by Martin. The song criticizes gentrification and displacement as it warns Puerto Ricans to protect their culture, land, and language. The Hollywood Reporter reviewed the song as addressing "ethnic cleansing and colonization" and "what is happening to Puerto Rico, as it gets stripped of its culture and identity, just like Hawaii".

"El Apagón" was performed by Bad Bunny, as dancers dressed as sugarcane workers performed on electric utility poles, a visual which some scholars said demonstrated "the continuity between colonial exploitation of Puerto Ricans across centuries". Sugar plantations operated in Puerto Rico using enslaved African labor until 1873 under Spanish rule, and after the US took control in 1898, American sugar companies acquired significant land in Puerto Rico, where jíbaros or Puerto Rican farmers were employed.

The utility pole imagery also referenced the massive electrical grid collapse caused by Hurricane Maria in 2017, after which residents taught themselves electrical skills and climbed poles to restore power. Since then, the archipelago and island has suffered from recurrent power outages, which have been widely associated with LUMA Energy, the private company responsible for the electric power transmission and distribution in Puerto Rico since June 2021. The company took over the responsibilities from the Puerto Rico Electric Power Authority (the territory's public electric power company that had declared bankruptcy due to the hurricane's damage to the grid) at the recommendation of the Financial Oversight and Management Board for Puerto Rico, which has been responsible for overseeing the territory's budget since the Puerto Rican government-debt crisis. Infamous for protesting Puerto Ricans as La Junta ("The Board"), it has been criticized by many as an act of colonialism, given that it claims to be at the service of the Puerto Rican people, but is not electorally accountable to the residents and voters of Puerto Rico as the board's members are appointed by the President of the United States—whom the people of Puerto Rico cannot vote for since the island is a U.S. territory rather than a U.S. state, despite Puerto Ricans being U.S. citizens.

During his performance of the song, Bad Bunny also carried a Puerto Rican flag featuring a light blue triangle, which has become strongly associated with the Puerto Rican independence movement. Some commentators interpreted the gesture as a call for the independence of Puerto Rico from the US. In 2024, Bad Bunny expressed support for Alianza de País (Country Alliance), a pro-independence electoral alliance between the Puerto Rican Independence Party and the Citizens' Victory Movement.

== Reception ==
=== Critical ===
Daniel Fienberg from The Hollywood Reporter called it "the most impressively conceived and executed Super Bowl halftime production I've ever seen... vital in every imaginable definition of the word". The Chicago Tribune reviewer Christopher Borrelli described it as "a cultural moment, a paradigm shift". Time characterized the show as being "a fierce act of resistance" and "a sharp cultural and history lesson". Deadline Hollywood called it "a complex and compelling success" and "a celebration of excellence and love of Latino USA". On NPR's It's Been A Minute, host Brittany Luse along with guests Reanna Cruz and Alana Casanova-Burgess characterized the show as wholesome, stating that it showcased "joy as resistance".

Billboard said it was "one of the most culturally specific productions in Super Bowl history". The magazine also ranked the performance at number ten on its list of the 15 best Super Bowl halftime shows, writing that "while it may go down in history as one of the most endlessly debated halftime shows, it ought to be remembered as the halftime show with the best direction and cinematography since, well, ever". Rob Sheffield of Rolling Stone ranked it the second-best Super Bowl halftime show of all time, behind Prince's Super Bowl XLI halftime show in 2007. The Washington Post described the show as largely restrained and celebratory, highlighting its inclusive message and emphasis on unity and love. Catholic bishop Eusebio Ramos Morales, president of the Episcopal Conference of Puerto Rico, also praised the performance.

=== Political ===
President Trump criticized the performance on Truth Social, calling it "absolutely terrible, one of the worst, ever!" Rolling Stone noted that Trump's reaction came despite the White House having previously stated that he would not be watching the halftime show. White House press secretary Karoline Leavitt previously stated that "the president would much prefer a Kid Rock performance over Bad Bunny", while California governor Gavin Newsom made a tongue-in-cheek tweet mocking Trump by imitating his writing style after declaring the day of the Super Bowl to be "Bad Bunny Day" in California.

The "All-American Halftime Show", an alternative halftime event organized by Turning Point USA, featured Kid Rock, Brantley Gilbert, Lee Brice, and Gabby Barrett, as well as former NFL players Eric Dickerson and Brett Favre, and former ESPN host Sage Steele. The event peaked 6.1 million simultaneous views on YouTube, which Variety labelled as "slapdash" and in contrast called Bad Bunny's show "an All-American triumph".

==== Congressional response ====
In the days following the performance, several Republican members of Congress called for investigations into the halftime show. Representative Andy Ogles of Tennessee sent a formal letter to Representative Brett Guthrie, chairman of the House Committee on Energy and Commerce, requesting a congressional inquiry into the NFL and NBCUniversal over their approval and broadcast of the performance. Ogles described the show as "pure smut" and alleged it depicted gay sexual acts and contained lyrics glorifying sodomy. In a separate post on X (formerly Twitter), Ogles stated that the performance was "conclusive proof that Puerto Rico should never be a state".

LGBTQ advocacy groups criticized Ogles' characterization of the performance. Laurel Powell, communications director for the Human Rights Campaign, stated: "Queer people exist, and we're part of the American fabric—a message that Bad Bunny sent loud and clear. We're all American, together. And if our existence makes you uncomfortable, you're not suited to be representing people in Congress."

Representative Randy Fine of Florida announced that he and other Republicans would send a letter to FCC (Federal Communications Commission) chairman Brendan Carr calling for "fines and broadcast license reviews" against the NFL, NBC, and Bad Bunny. Following Fine's complaint, the FCC requested a transcript of the show. After reviewing the transcript, FCC commissioner Anna M. Gomez stated that the show did not violate any rules. Representative Mark Alford of Missouri stated on Real America's Voice that House Republicans were already "investigating" the halftime show and consulting with FCC commissioner Carr, comparing the performance to the 2004 Janet Jackson wardrobe malfunction and suggesting it "could be much worse". Alford acknowledged that he did not watch the entire performance and does not speak Spanish. Critics noted that many of the explicit lyrics cited by Republican lawmakers were translations of Bad Bunny songs that were not actually performed during the halftime show, as the set had been edited for broadcast.

Democratic lawmakers largely praised the performance. Senator Patty Murray of Washington wrote on X that the "all-American superstar" had given a beautiful performance. Representative Jim McGovern of Massachusetts called it a display of unity and love over division. Senator Raphael Warnock of Georgia and Representative Alexandria Ocasio-Cortez of New York also expressed support for the performance.

=== Awards ===
The show and its contributors were nominated on July 8, 2026, for nine awards at the 78th Primetime Creative Arts Emmy Awards. Its the seventh consecutive Super Bowl halftime show to be nominated for the organization's live variety special award and the most-nominated Super Bowl halftime show in Emmys history, beating out the Super Bowl LI halftime show's six nominations. The nominations are in the categories of choreography for variety or reality programming; directing for a variety special; hairstyling for a variety, nonfiction, or reality program; lighting design and/or direction for a special; live variety special; music direction; production design for a variety special; sound mixing for a variety series or special; and technical direction and camerawork for a special. The awards were given out on September 5, 2026, with the show and its contributors winning seven of the nine nominations, missing out on the hairstyling and production design awards.

Year	Organization	Category	Recipient	Result	Ref.
2026	Primetime Emmy Awards	Choreography for Variety or Reality Programming	Charm La'Donna, choreographer Karina Ortiz, choreographer	Won	
2026	Primetime Emmy Awards	Directing for a Variety Special	Hamish Hamilton	Won	
2026	Primetime Emmy Awards	Hairstyling for a Variety, Nonfiction or Reality Program	Brian Steven Banks, department head hairstylist Mariah Montes, key hairstylist Iraina Crenshaw, hairstylist Maaliq Amadeus Elliott, hairstylist Nikki Wright, hairstylist Paula Ashby, hairstylist Shian Banks, hairstylist Yvette Shelton, hairstylist	Nominated	
2026	Primetime Emmy Awards	Lighting Design / Lighting Direction for a Special	Al Gurdon, lighting designer Ben Green, lighting director Harry Forster, lighting director Eric Marchwinski, moving light programmer Mark Humphrey, moving light programmer Alen Sisul, gaffer Lee Spencer, gaffer Jason Rudolph, media server programmer	Won	
2026	Primetime Emmy Awards	Music Direction	Miguel Gandelman	Won	
2026	Primetime Emmy Awards	Production Design for a Variety Special	Bruce Rodgers, production designer Julio Himede, production designer Shelley Rodgers, supervising art director Leticia Leon, art director Lily Rodgers, art director	Nominated	
2026	Primetime Emmy Awards	Sound Mixing for a Variety Series or Special	Thomas Holmes, production mixer Alex Guessard, FOH mixer Dave Natale, FOH mixer Christian Schrader, supplemental mixer Thomas Pesa, monitor mixer Pablo Munguia, Pro Tools mixer	Won	
2026	Primetime Emmy Awards	Technical Direction and Camerawork for a Special	Rod Wardell, technical director Eric Becker, technical director Dylan Sanford, director of photography Andrew Moore, camera Bettina Levesque, camera Brad Zerbst, camera Cody Taylor, camera Danny Bonilla, camera David Plakos, camera Gilberto Cruz, camera Helena Jackson, camera Jeremy Freeman, camera Jofre Rosero, camera Keith Dicker, camera Kevin Denning, camera Kevin French, camera Keyan Safyari, camera Martin Kitchen, camera Matt Roe, camera Matt Trujillo, camera Monte Seaborn, camera Rick Compeau, camera Rob Balton, camera Robert Smith, camera Santiago Benet, camera Scott I. Acosta, camera Sean Flannery, camera Su-Jeng Sang, camera Adam Lighterman, video control Chris Hill, video control Matt Conrad, video control	Won	
2026	Primetime Emmy Awards	Variety Special (Live)	Benito Martínez, performer and producer Desiree Perez, executive producer Jesse Collins, executive producer Noah Assad, executive producer Shawn Carter, executive producer Dave Meyers, co-executive producer Jody Kolozsvari, supervising producer Darren Pfeffer, producer Jana Fleishman, producer Chelsea Gonnering, line producer John Kilgore, line producer	Won	

== Impact ==
=== Commercial ===
Following the performance, Bad Bunny streams increased 470% in the US and 210% globally, occupying the top six spots of Spotify's US Daily Top Songs Chart. "Yo Perreo Sola" had a 2,170% increase in comparison of the previous day streams numbers and "El Apagón" 1,320% increase globally. Shazam named him as the "Most Recognized Latin Artist in a Single Day", with an increase of more than 400% during and immediately following the halftime show, while the songs "Die with a Smile" and "Lo Que Le Pasó a Hawaii" were the most Shazamed songs during the event. On Apple Music, 23 songs landed in the Top 100, including nine in the top twenty-five and five in the top ten, and "DTMF" rose to number one. Listeners were up by seven times, and "DTMF", "Baile Inolvidable", and "Tití Me Preguntó" were the most streamed songs immediately after the show. In the United Kingdom, Debí Tirar Más Fotos jumped from 44 to 2 on the UK Albums Chart, earning a new highest peak and the first top 10 album for Bad Bunny in the region. In France, the album jumped from 9 to the number one spot with 14,133 equivalent units sold. "DTMF" jumped from 43 to 4 on the UK Singles Chart, while "Nuevayol" reached 15 and "Baile Inolvidable" at 20.

The following week, songs and albums continued to receive a sales boost on the US Billboard Hot 100 and 200 due the halftime show. "DTMF" jumped from nine to one, becoming the fourth all or mostly Spanish song to have topped the charts and his first solo number one single, with 43 million streams (up 85%), 5.3 million in airplay audience (up 56%) and 12,000 digital download sold (up 262%). Also, "Baile Inolvidable" rise from 19 to 2 with 28.8 million streams (up 141%), 4.3 million in airplay audience (up 2%) and 4,000 copies sold (up 231%), "Nuevayol" from 28 to 5 with 24.4 million streams (up 165%). 3.1 million in airplay audience (up 19%) and 5,000 sold (up 238%) and "Tití Me Preguntó" re-entered on number 7 with 22.6 million streams (up 334%),1.8 million in airplay audience (up 71%) and 10,000 sold (up 734%). On the Billboard 200, Debí Tirar Más Fotos stayed at the number two position which reached the previous week due streams boost following winning Album of the Year at the 68th Annual Grammy Awards, but it scored 250,000 united (up 191%), making it Bad Bunny's best mark ever. Un Verano Sin Ti also moved up 10 spots from No. 16 to No. 6 with 81,000 units, (a 63% jump from the previous week). On the issue dated February 21, 2026, the 14-minute halftime performance, which was also released as an audio track onto streaming platforms shortly after the Super Bowl concluded, debuted on three Billboard charts, mainly debuting at number 31 on the US Hot Latin Songs chart with 2.78 million streams and 2,000 downloads. He also became the first artist to occupy the top 25 spots on the same chart.

The show was seen by a combined 128.2 million average viewers, making it the fourth-most watched halftime show in history, after Kendrick Lamar in 2025 (133.5 million), Michael Jackson in 1993 (133.4 million), and Usher in 2024 (129.3 million). Despite 137.8 million peak viewers (the highest viewership in history) watching the second quarter, 9.6 million viewers were lost from its lead-in. With 4 billion views after the first 24 hours, 55% of those originating from international markets, it became the most-viewed halftime show on social media. It also became the most-watched American football-related program on Telemundo with an audience of 4.8 million.

=== Cultural ===
The halftime show sparked increased interest in Spanish language learning in the US. Duolingo, a language learning platform, reported a 35 percent increase in Spanish language learners during and immediately following the performance. The company, which has approximately 116.7 million users worldwide with nearly 49 million learning Spanish, shared data on social media showing a sharp spike in Spanish lessons coinciding with the broadcast. The surge followed Bad Bunny's appearance on Saturday Night Live in October 2025, during which he had challenged viewers to learn Spanish before the Super Bowl.

Duolingo had launched a two-week marketing campaign ahead of the game, including television advertisements during the AFC Championship Game and NFC Championship Game featuring its mascot dressed as Bad Bunny, as well as a New York City Subway advertising takeover. Duolingo CMO Manu Orssaud told Adweek: "When something captures people's attention, learning follows. The surge in Spanish learning during and after the halftime show shows the appetite is there."

The performance generated significant discussion within Latino communities across the US. Carlos Ayala, a 36-year-old from San Juan, told The Hill: "I thought it was phenomenal that Bad Bunny brought all Latinos together in one place and represented them all equally. It's an important moment for Latino culture." The day after its appearance on the show, Villa's Tacos registered long queues outside their business spot, with some customers in line saying that they "had never tasted [Villa's] tacos before". Villa told to press that "During a time where Latino immigrants are frowned upon, we were there to reinforce that we're just about love."

== Set list ==
Set list adapted from Business Insider.

1. "Tití Me Preguntó"
2. "Yo Perreo Sola" (with "Safaera")
3. "Voy a Llevarte Pa' PR" (prefaced by elements of "Party")
4. "Eoo" (Note: "Eoo" is prefaced by a mashup of chorus elements of "Pa' Que Retozen" by Tego Calderón, "Dale Don Dale" by Don Omar, "Noche de Travesura" by Héctor el Father and "Gasolina" by Daddy Yankee, songs released in the mid-2000s that have made significant contributions to the musical genre of reggaetón and influenced Bad Bunny's career.)
5. "Mónaco" (Note: "Mónaco" is performed with a live violin sample of "Hier encore" by Charles Aznavour, conducted by Giancarlo Guerrero.) (violin arrangement)
6. "Die with a Smile" (salsa rendition performed by Lady Gaga)
7. "Baile Inolvidable"
8. "Nuevayol"
9. "Lo Que Le Pasó a Hawaii" (performed by Ricky Martin)
10. "El Apagón"
11. "Café con Ron" (with elements of "El Apagón", featuring Los Pleneros de la Cresta)
12. "DTMF" (outro)

== Personnel ==
Credits and personnel adapted from Liam Lunniss and Live Design.

Main performer

- Bad Bunny

Direction and production

- Director: Hamish Hamilton
- Associate directors: Hayley Collett and Cameron Whitelaw
- Director of photography: Dylan Sanford
- Executive producers: Dave Meyers, Desiree Perez, Jesse Collins, Roger Goodell and Shawn Carter
- Producer: Jana Fleishman
- Supervising producer: Jody Kolozsavari
- Associate producer: Matt Mojo

Creative personnel

- Creative directors: Benito Antonio Martínez Ocasio, Bruce Rodgers and Harriet Cuddeford
- Associate creative director: Liam Lunniss
- Creative producers: Cory FitzGerald, Harriet Cuddeford, Liam Lunniss and Tiffany Olson
- Field creative producer: Kristen "KP" Terry
- Creative assistant: Daniela Matos
- Music director: Miguel Gandelman

Choreography

- Lead choreographer: Charm La'Donna
- Associate choreographers: Jovanni Soto, Karina Ortiz and Melany Mercedes
- Team choreographer: Valerie Lemus
- Stunt choreographer: Kianí Del Valle
- Stunt coordinator: Sara Beko
- Field cast choreographer: Kristen "KP" Terry

Art and production design

- Production designer: Bruce Rodgers of Tribe Inc.
- Lead art director: Shelley Rodgers
- Art directors: Connor Munion, Leticia León, Lily Rodgers and Oli Coleman
- Art department assistants: Andrew Frey and Regan Eastland
- Set fabrication and engineering: All Access Staging
- Scenery: Atomic Scenery, Global Scenic, JetSets, Lennon & Co., ShowFX and Trio Entertainment Services

Lighting

- Lighting designers: Al Gurdon and Cory FitzGerald
- Lighting directors: Ben Green, Eric Marchwinski, Harry Forster and Mark Humphrey
- Programmers: Eric Marchwinski and Mark Humphrey
- Lighting drafter: Jeff Behm

== Charts ==
=== Weekly charts for "Super Bowl LX Halftime Show" (Live) single ===
Weekly chart performance
Chart (2026)	Peak position
US Bubbling Under Hot 100 (Billboard)	12
US Hot Latin Rhythm Songs (Billboard)	22
US Hot Latin Songs (Billboard)	31
US Hot Tropical Songs (Billboard)	6

== See also ==
- American football in Puerto Rico
- 2026 in American music
- 2026 in American television
