= Quitarte To' =

- Single Cover

Single by Tego Calderón feat. Randy

from the album El Abayarde Contraataca
- Released: October 16, 2007
- Recorded: 2007
- Genre: Reggaeton
- Length: 3:31
- Label: Jiggiri Records; Warner Musica Latina
- Songwriter(s): Tegui Calderón Rossario; Randy Ortiz; Guelo Star
- Producer(s): DJ Giann, Dexter & Mister Greenz

Tego Calderón singles chronology
"Tradicional A Lo Bravo" (2006)	"Quitarte To'" (2007)	"Ni Fu Ni Fa" (2007)

Randy singles chronology
"Shorty" (2007)	"Quitarte To'" (2007)	"Un Poco Loca" (2007)

"Quitarte To'" is Tego Calderón's second single for his album El Abayarde Contraataca. It had a lot of airplay for more than a month. The song features Randy Ortiz of Jowell & Randy and has an unofficial reggaeton remix with the dembow and other reggaeton features added. "Quitarte To'" was a major reggaeton hit, and had significant airplay.

== Background ==
"Quitarte To'" was a major reggaeton hit, and had a lot of airplay throughout the United States, Latin America, and Europe. It was heard for a longer time than the previous single from the album, "Tradicional A Lo Bravo". It has the same style as most reggaeton songs at its time. It is still heard throughout the radio, and reached #2 on the Latin charts.

== Remix ==
Two remixes of the song were made, which are both with the same artists, Tego Calderón and Randy. The remixes are the following:

- A Reggaeton mix was made which is the beat and instrumentals, with an additional dembow and other reggaeton sounds.
- Another remix appears on one of Tego's mixtapes titled Gongoli (The Mixtape). It has the same vocals, but with a different beat, and the chorus is heard an additional time.

== Music video ==
Like all other singles on El Abayarde Contraataca, "Quitarte To'" has a music video. The video was not played anywhere near as much as the song was heard. It was the least watched video on the album, but was watched a lot throughout the internet. The video premiered on Mun2.

== Charts performance ==
Chart (2007)	Peak position
US Latin Airplay (Billboard)	10
US Hot Latin Songs (Billboard)	10
US Tropical Songs (Billboard)	17
US Latin Rhythm Airplay (Billboard)	2
