= Los Maté =

- Single Cover

Single by Tego Calderón

from the album The Underdog/El Subestimado
- Released: August 15, 2006
- Recorded: 2006
- Genre: Reggaeton
- Length: 2:55
- Label: Jiggiri Records; Atlantic Records
- Songwriters: Tegui Calderon Rossario; Ernesto F. Padilla; Antonio Cantoral Garcia; Roberto Cantoral Garcia
- Producers: Nesty "La Mente Maestra"; Naldo

Tego Calderón singles chronology
"Bandoleros" (2004)	"Los Maté" (2006)	"Chillin'" (2006)

"Los Maté" is a reggaeton song performed by Tego Calderón for his album The Underdog/El Subestimado. The song was released as the album's lead single in late 2006 and became a reggaeton hit, peaking inside the top ten on the majority of the charts it entered. This single was released with Jiggiri Records (Tego Calderón's label) and Atlantic Records. A remix featuring Arcángel and Chyno Nyno has been made.

== Background ==
In the booklet of The Underdog/El Subestimado, Tego Calderón states that "Los Maté" is a dis track. The reason that he released the lead single as a dis track is that the meaning of The Underdog/El Subestimado is that others tried to take Tego out of the game, but failed to do so. The track disses Lito & Polaco, and Tego eventually stopped releasing dis tracks once El Abayarde Contraataca was released. The song background and begging comes from a song from Roberto Cantoral called "El preso numero 9".

== Track listings and formats ==
Digital download single

1. "Los Maté" - 2:53

== Music video ==
The music video for "Los Maté" was the album's first music video filmed. During this time, Tego Calderón was getting a lot of airplay. The music video reflects what the song lyrics express. Other than the guys holding the guitars and a woman, Tego Calderón is the only person seen in the music video. Tego Calderón raps while the woman dances reggaeton, and expresses that the others failed to take him out of the game.

== Remix ==
A remix of "Los Maté" has also been made. It features artists Arcángel and Chyno Nyno. The chorus is sung differently, and Tego Calderón changes his rap. Although the remix hasn't been on any of Tego's albums, it has been on many mixtapes including mixtapes by DJ Sin-Cero. The remix is another dis to Lito & Polaco.

== Credits and personnel ==
- Writers:
  - Tegui Calderon Rossario
  - Ernesto F. Padilla
  - Antonio Cantoral Garcia
  - Roberto Cantoral
- Publisher:
  - Malito Music, Inc.
  - Ernesto F. Padilla
  - Peer International Corp.
- Producer: DJ Nesty
  - Naldo
- Studio: Flow Music Studio
- Recorded by: DJ Nesty
- Mixed by: Gary Noble

== Chart performance ==
Chart (2007)	Peak position
Latin Rhythm Airplay	5
Hot Latin Songs	11
Latin Tropical Airplay	26
