= Tradicional A Lo Bravo =

- Single Cover

Single by Tego Calderón

from the album El Abayarde Contraataca
- Released: August 7, 2007
- Recorded: 2006
- Genre: Reggaeton
- Length: 3:45
- Label: Jiggiri Records; Warner Musica Latina
- Songwriter(s): Tegui Calderón Rossario
- Producer(s): Almonte

Tego Calderón singles chronology
"Cuando Baila Reggaeton" (2007)	"Tradicional A Lo Bravo" (2007)	"Quitarte To' '" (2006)

"Tradicional A Lo Bravo" is a song performed by Tego Calderón for his album El Abayarde Contraataca. The song was released as the album's first and promotional single in late 2007 and had a lot of airplay during the two weeks after the song got released. This single was released with Jiggiri Records (Tego Calderón's label) and Warner Musica Latina.

== Background ==
"Tradicional A Lo Bravo" is based on the Latin culture, and Tego Calderón greatly influenced writing this song. The single has both its lyrics and its music video based on the album. It was recorded by Victor "El Nasi" and wasn't considered as completely reggaeton, but was Tego's own type of music.

== Music video ==
"Tradicional A Lo Bravo" was the first music video on the album, being the first single released. The music video reflects both the album's theme, and the song's lyrics. It is shown in a bar, and shows animated figures throughout the video. It was watched in all channels, including Mun2, MTV Tr3s, and others. Tego Calderón performed "Tradicional A Lo Bravo" live on Mi TRL, and got interviewed on many programs.

== Charts ==
Chart (2007)	Peak position
US Tropical Songs (Billboard)	13
