= Chillin' (Tego Calderón song) =

Single by Don Omar and Tego Calderón

- Picture CD

Single by Tego Calderón featuring Don Omar

from the album The Underdog/El Subestimado
- Released: October 20, 2006
- Genre: Reggae; dancehall
- Length: 3:15
- Label: Jiggiri; Atlantic
- Songwriters: Tegui Calderon Rossario; Domingo Ramos; Corey Jackson Hill; William Omar Landron; James Chambers
- Producer: Major League

Tego Calderón singles chronology
"Los Maté" (2006)	"Chillin'" (2006)	"Cuando Baila Reggaeton" (2006)

Don Omar singles chronology
"Salió El Sol" (2006)	"Chillin'" (2006)	"Nunca Habia Llorado Asi" (2007)

"Chillin'" is Tego Calderón's second single for his album The Underdog/El Subestimado. The single got a lot of airplay when it was released, and features reggaeton superstar Don Omar. The song is known to be pure reggae, and the video was shot in Jamaica, the birthplace of reggae music.

== Music video ==
The music video for "Chillin'" was the album's second music video. The video was directed by Scott Franklin. During the time the video got directed, Tego Calderón was working on his European tour, and did a lot of work with Don Omar.

The music video was shot in Jamaica, which reflects the song, because Jamaica is the birthplace of reggae, and the song is pure reggae and dancehall. Tego Calderón and Don Omar also reflect the song's lyrics by doing the act of "chilling" in Jamaica. The video is shot along the beach, and in various touristic parts of the island.

== Charts ==
Chart (2007)	Peak position
US Tropical Songs (Billboard)	8
