= American football in Puerto Rico =

- Country: Puerto Rico
- Governing body: Puerto Rico Flag Football Federation
- National team: Puerto Rico
- Nickname: Football a la americana
- First played: November 20, 1928
- Registered players: 600–800
- Clubs: Parque Central Blue Wave; Altamesa Dolphins; Dorado Spartans; San Juan Falcons

Club competitions
- Puerto Rico American Football League; Puerto Rico American Football Alliance; East Puerto Rico Flag Football League; Puerto Rico NFL FLAG Official League

International competitions
- IFAF Central American and Caribbean Flag Football Regional Championships

Various forms of American football have been played in the Caribbean island of Puerto Rico since it was first introduced following the Spanish-American War, initially emerging as a college and youth-focused sport during the 1920s. In the decades since, various developmental and semiprofessional leagues have been consistently active island-wide. While several members of the Puerto Rican diaspora and three players born on the island have reached the National Football League (NFL), it remains a niche sport with practice below the classic trio of baseball, basketball and boxing, as well as various forms of athletics. Of these Federico Maranges became the first to sign after being developed by the local Pee Wee and high school leagues in 2025 and Ron Rivera, Isiah Pacheco and Victor Cruz have won the Super Bowl. Two organizations have represented Puerto Rico as affiliates of the International Federation of American Football (IFAF), the Puerto Rico American Football Federation (2012–2014) and the Puerto Rico Flag Football Federation (2025–present).

== History ==
=== Amateur and touch football ===
Gridiron football has been discussed by Puerto Rico's media since the 1920s, when it was known as "rugby football" or football a la americana to differentiate it from football, which had been locally practiced since the 19th Century. On November 20, 1928, the University of Puerto Rico (UPR) students gathered to form the UPR Boys team, which played a tackle football game against the Faculty Team, composed by the mostly-foreign faculty members. By the 1940s, the sport had gained enough following for the press to poll them on what coverage they wanted about the leagues abroad. On July 1, 1944, a team from the Instituto Politécnico de Puerto Rico (later Interamerican University of Puerto Rico) played a touch football game against a team of U.S. Coast Guardsmen stationed at Mayaguez. The “Poly” as it was colloquially known, had begun its tough football program the previous year. The following year, these games grew to include the UPR and the Naval Air Station. During World War II, a team was organized at Tortuguero and played against the Naval Station, dividing a series as part of the physical training for the soldiers stationed there. Both the Poly and the UPR faced the latter in touch football. The sport was also included as part of the curriculum of a physical education course offered by several professional athletes at the UPR.

The interchangeable use of the shorthand term "football" or fútbol in Spanish for both American football and association football led to some confusion among some of the populace, who would write to the media addressing the issue. Military teams continued playing in Puerto Rico well into the 1950s. By the 1960s, American football had gained favor among the youth of some schools, such as the American Military Academy in Guaynabo, reaching what was considered "a fever pitch". School games began being held, in hope that the sport became popular enough to join the regular competitive lineup. During this decade, the Puerto Rico Pee Wee Football League began operating, serving as a formative entity for children on the island. American football became popular among the Puerto Rico High School Athletic Alliance or La Alianza, a league of private high schools that included Colegio San Antonio Abad, Ramey, St. John's Prep, Commonwealth, San Juan Episcopal, the American Military Academy, Robinson School, Antillas Military Academy and Roosevelt Roads. These teams practiced in full gear, including a helmet and long sleeves, which drew some skepticism from the media due to Puerto Rico's tropical weather.

By 1971, La Alianza had 250 players divided into seven schools based at Puerto Rico and the United States Virgin Islands. The first intercollegiate American tackle football game was played on December 4, 1971, between the UPR Río Piedras campus and the Interamerican University and held at Levittown. By 1973, the Alianza was hosting teams from abroad for exhibition games, with the Commonwealth High School Comets facing the St. Andrews High School Scots from Boca Raton, Florida at the Maxie Williams Field in Fort Buchannan. In 1974, Secretary of Education Ramon A. Cruz implemented a program where private firms would sponsor the teams of the nascent Puerto Rico Public High School Football League (PRPHSFL), an island-wide public high school league with the participation of Central High School, Gabriela Mistral High School, Caparra Terrace High School, Dr. Lazaro High School, Pedro Albizu Campos High School, Manuela Toro High School, Manati High School, Ponce High School and Hostos High School, Guayanilla and Yauco. A final game between the champions of the private and public leagues was to determine the national title. The Fundacion Pro-Desarollo Football Americano en Puerto Rico gathered private investors and a plan to televise youth games. Venues like Parque Sixto Escobar were occasionally used to train, most of the players in the Pee Wee League were Puerto Ricans and the Phi Eta Mu fraternity incorporated into its curriculum.

=== NFL Nuyoricans and semiprofessional league ===
The sport was not exempt to the overarching debate on the status of Puerto Rico that permeated most aspects of society during the second half of the 20th Century, with some citizens raising concerns that it would be used to impose a foreign "American way of life". Others criticized it as a sport of “blanquitos”, a term mostly used for well off families, and argued that it was not widely understood among the population. But those involved agued that the game was no longer “gringo”, being played in Asia and Latin America, that the players were sourced from all backgrounds and that concerns with injuries were overblown by the American media. The migration of Puerto Ricans abroad, however, also led to the development of multi-sport athletes that also practiced American football regularly, such as basketball player Cesar Fantauzzi. During the summer of 1976, the Washington Redskins of the National Football League (NFL) offered clinics to 500 children. In 1978, the Pee Wee League opened the 9-10 category to include the first girl, Dennisse Wright. In the 11 years class, Josefina Padilla was noted for her performance in a boys team. Entering the 1980s, the Pee Wee League had grown to include for divisions (A to D) gathering 500 players and celebrating an All-Star Game, with 85% of its board being Puerto Ricans. The Puerto Rico Club Football League coordinated high school American football and its membership remained at ten teams.

The popularization of cable vision led to an increase in interest, but among the average Puerto Rican it was still perceived as a "brutal" and violent sport, with following suffering due to the absence of a local star figure in collegial or professional American football. A group of young players organized the Puerto Rico Football Alliance (PRFA) in 1982, with the specific intent of running as a semiprofessional league that would include those that graduated high school, which began with six teams representing Hato Rey, Rio Piedras, Guaynabo, Fajardo, Ponce and Aguadilla. However, this league noted that it lacked backing and was funding its own equipment, with little support from the government or organized sports entities. A generalized lack of publicity for all levels of American football and the preexistent stereotypes were noted by the local press, which also covered how family dynamics supported the ongoing continuation of the leagues and the daily routines and development of the players. In 1987, the PRFA's Manatí Thunderbolts hosted the New Brunswick Panthers of the Tri-State Football Alliance in the first edition of the Friendship Bowl. The participation of Ron Rivera and Daniel Peter in the NFL earned local attention.

By the 1990s, the sport's following continued growing due to cable television being at the peak of its popularity, but this exposure only emphasized the NCAA and NFL, with little attention to the local circuits. During this decade, Pee Wee League alumni Jorge Flores (Purdue University) and Mike Vizcarrondo (Tulane University) reached the NCAA, becoming the first locally developed players to reach that level of competition. Willy Rivera (Bryant University), Gerardo Rodríguez (Stetson University), Jaydell Torres (Springfield College) and Armando Torres (Springfield College) would do the same and later return to Puerto Rico to coach. The island's historic past gained some relevance in American popular culture when a play named "The Annexation of Puerto Rico" (a fumblerooski) was featured as a plot element in the 1994 movie Little Giants, which Ron Rivera himself would later use as an NFL coach.

=== PRAFF IFAF affiliation ===
Teams representing Puerto Rico were organized as far back as 2010, scoring results such as a 20-0 (forfeit) win over Panama, but these were considered recreational games as opposed to regular lineups. The Puerto Rico American Football Federation first gained IFAF full membership in 2012, being assigned to IFAF Americas, but did not receive a vote at the entity's Congress due to not paying membership fees up front. However, the initiative was not continued and the affiliation to the international governing body ceased as the local federation struggled to stay active outside of the Puerto Rico Olympic Committee (COPUR) and was eventually cancelled. In 2014 the PRAFL celebrated its 30th anniversary with eight teams based throughout the island and led by figures such as quarterback Héctor Fernández. In 2015, the first team organized with the intention of competing on the international stage won a tournament by defeating a select of the Dominican Republic 35-6 and another from Mexico 19–0, with players from the local league such as Paul Christensen, Zésar Zorba, Fernando Nieto and José Rodríguez. During this decade, New York Giants's wide receiver Victor Cruz incorporated another element of Puerto Rican culture, salsa dancing, to his game by using it as his trademark touchdown dance.

The passing of hurricane Maria and the subsequent outbreak of the COVID-19 pandemic had considerable impact on the local American football scene, which responded by merging the Puerto Rico Pee Wee Football League y la Puerto Rico High School Football League to create the Puerto Rico American Football Alliance (PRFA), based at Ciudad Deportiva Roberto Clemente and with a membership of 600 players. Several players were recruited for college during this time, including Joseph Figueroa (Southwest Oklahoma State University) and the trio of Rhanyam Kerniza, César Irrizarry and Yadimil Rodríguez at Anna Marie College. In 2022, a private firm organized by a now retired Gerardo Rodríguez named Legacy Sports Agency began coordinating tryouts and scrimmages with IMG Academy and other institutions with the intent of helping the players secure collegiate.

During the 2000s and 2010s, more variants debuted including the eight-man football Puerto Rico 8Man Football League (PR8FL) and the first flag football team Higueñas de Cataño, while the Super Bowl and NFL gained more following. However, jurisdiction rights meant that the programing experienced some blackouts in the local transmission and the NFL Sunday Ticket wasn't available until 2023 following the intervention of the Puerto Rico Federal Affairs Administration. By this time, the sport was reported to have reached another "fever pitch" stage with players such as Jenseer Villanueva, Carlos Santiago, Nestor Rodríguez, Carlos Rodríguez, Carlos Vázquez, Danny Paz and Gabriel Sevilla on the boys side and Grace Cabrera, Emiry Vélez, Camila Blas, Karelys Benítez, Elieshka Figueroa, Ecmarieliz Larregui, Angelis Rodríguez, Adriana Cela on the girls side, gathering attention from collegiate programs. An increase of second generation Puerto Ricans in NFL led to the heritage being featured in league sponsored content, with Isiah Pacheco of the Kansas City Chiefs as the public spokesman for the island in the Por La Cultura campaign and hosting flag football clinics locally. The running back joined artist Daddy Yankee in outreach programs directed towards Latin American communities and also hoisted the flag of Puerto Rico during the team's 2024 Super Bowl win. Other players of Puerto Rican ascent active in the NFL during this time were Chris Rodriguez Jr. of the Washington Commanders and Cesar Ruiz of the New Orleans Saints.

=== PRFFF and sanctioned international events ===
After years of federative vacancy, the Puerto Rico Flag Football Federation (PRFFF), founded in 2014, began pursuing international sanctioning and affiliation. By this time, recruitment of PRFA players had grown to include NCAA division I in the case of Alex Voss at North Carolina University and the United Kingdom, with the trio of Sergio Saldaña, Xilef Kuilan and Yadriel Romero being offered by Leeds Beckett University. However, Federico Maranges became the league's most successful export by signing with the Seattle Seahawks following a college career at Florida Atlantic University and making the Super Bowl after signing as a free agent. Though not developed locally, Caguas native Israel Villegas Díaz also received media attention as a college prospect. In 2024, Trystan Colon of the Arizona Cardinals noted his interest in helping American football expand in Puerto Rico, where his parents were born.

After Bad Bunny was selected to headline the halftime show of Super Bowl LX, American football received increased media coverage and an increase in interest was noted in Puerto Rico. With the event, the NFL also released the merchandise line The Concho Collection featuring the endemic Puerto Rican crested toad, associated with both local culture and the artist himself. In May 2026, Favián Ignacio Ramos Rodríguez received an NCAA Division I scholarship to play for Stetson University. He was part of the Legacy agency's roster, developed in the local leagues and attended Colegio Rosa Bell as a high school student. By the summer of 2026, the NCAA and ESPN had announced the creation of the Puerto Rico Bowl, which would host Division I teams competing for the trophy at Juan Ramón Loubriel Stadium.

The Puerto Rico NFL FLAG Official League program was inaugurated, with the modality being practiced among both sexes and coed categories from 9U to 17U, sending its champions to the main club tournament in the division, the NFL FLAG International Championships. The East Puerto Rico Flag Football League operates under the PRFFF and hosts the adult division. In its first IFAF tournament, both the men's and women's flag football national teams won their respective branches at the 2026 Central American and Caribbean Flag Football Regional Championships in undefeated fashion. The debut followed preparations that began during the fall of 2025 and included a participation at the private club tournament Panama City Bowl, with the intent of participating in the inaugural Olympic flag football tournament at Los Angeles 2028. The modality continued to expand during the following weeks, with the introduction of a university flag 5 league and beach flag tournament.

== Organization ==
=== Youth and High School ===
- Puerto Rico American Football Alliance (PRAFA)
- Puerto Rico NFL FLAG Official League

=== College ===
- Liga Intercolegial de Flag 5 de Puerto Rico (LIF5)

=== Adult amateur football and semi-pro football ===
- Puerto Rico American Football League (PRAFL)
- East Puerto Rico Flag Football League (EPRFFL)

== National teams ==
=== Tackle football ===
- Puerto Rico men's national American football team
- Puerto Rico women's national American football team

=== Flag football ===
- Puerto Rico men's national flag football team
- Puerto Rico women's national flag football team
