= Borinqueña (album) =

Studio album by Roselyn Sánchez
- Released: September 23, 2003
- Genre: Latin
- Label: BMG
- Producer: Roy Tavare for Bayahibe Music, Inc.

Borinqueña is the debut studio album by Puerto Rican actress Roselyn Sánchez. The first single from the album entitled "Amor Amor" was nominated for a Latin Grammy for Best Music Video.

== Track listing ==
1. "I Wanna Feel Your Rumba" (featuring Tyrese) - 4:02
2. "Amor Amor" (featuring Tego Calderón) - 4:41
3. "Mito" - 4:46
4. "Suavecito" - 3:17
5. "Noche De Verano" (featuring Víctor Manuelle) - 4:08
6. "Olas Y Arenas" - 3:45
7. "Caricias" - 4:24
8. "Es Por Ti" - 4:29
9. "Amante Mio" - 3:52
10. "Lloro" - 3:23
11. "El Camino" - 4:46
12. "Amor Amor" (Salsa version) + ["Amor Amor" Hidden Dance Version]
