= Lo Que Le Pasó a Hawaii =

2025 song by Bad Bunny

Song by Bad Bunny

from the album Debí Tirar Más Fotos
- Released: January 5, 2025
- Recorded: 2024
- Genre: Jíbaro
- Length: 3:49
- Label: Rimas
- Songwriter: Benito Antonio Martínez Ocasio
- Producers: Tainy; Mag; Flor Morales Ramos; Big Jay; Luis Amed Irizarry

Visualizer
- "Lo Que Le Pasó a Hawaii" on YouTube

"Lo Que Le Pasó a Hawaii" (stylized as "LO QUE LE PASÓ A HAWAii"; Spanish pronunciation: [lo ke le paˈso a haˈwaj], transl. "What Happened to Hawaii") is a song by Puerto Rican rapper and singer Bad Bunny from his sixth studio album, Debí Tirar Más Fotos (2025). The fourteenth track on the album, it addresses gentrification in Puerto Rico and critiques the potential consequences of statehood for the island by drawing a comparison to the historical experience of Hawaii, which became a US state in 1959. The song uses instrumentation drawn from jíbaro music, a traditional folk genre from Puerto Rico's mountainous interior, combined with hip hop percussion.

In an exclusive Apple Music Track by Track feature, Bad Bunny said the song came to him in a dream that woke him in the early hours of the morning. "I don't remember ever dreaming a complete song from start to finish and having it not let me sleep," he said. "I woke up at two or three in the morning and had this song in my mind." He wrote the lyrics in a notes application on his phone and later recorded them largely unchanged.

== Background and composition ==
"Lo Que Le Pasó a Hawaii" features a sparse instrumental built around güiros, guitars, and a Puerto Rican cuatro associated with Puerto Rico's jíbaro folk tradition. Pitchfork described the song as "a sparse, moody warning about the rapid gringo-ification of Puerto Rico" in which Bad Bunny "speaks slowly and with a measured intimacy" over "sounds you would hear walking down cobblestone streets in San Juan." At points during the track, Bad Bunny's vocals cut off mid-phrase. Critics and listeners interpreted the silences variously as simulating the frequent electrical blackouts experienced on the island, or as a structural element drawn from jíbara music, in which pauses traditionally signal the start of an instrumental solo on the cuatro.

The song's lyrics center on a plea for Puerto Rico to avoid the fate of Hawaii, where American colonization led to the marginalization of Native Hawaiian language and cultural practices. The chorus repeats: "No, no suelte' la bandera ni olvide' el lelolai / Que no quiero que hagan contigo lo que le pasó a Hawái" ("Don't let go of the flag nor forget the lelolai / I don't want them to do to you what happened to Hawaii"). The "lelolai" references a vocal technique used in jíbaro music that serves as an expression of cultural identity; one commentator in Hawaii compared it to the Hawaiian word ea, which carries meanings of sovereignty, air, and rising.

== Visualizer ==
The song's YouTube visualizer, part of a series accompanying each track on the album, features a text by historian Jorell Meléndez-Badillo discussing the endangered endemic species of Puerto Rico. The text draws a parallel between the displacement of Puerto Ricans and the ecological disruption caused by migration, noting that the coquí frog, endemic to Puerto Rico, traveled to Hawaii hidden in the luggage of Puerto Rican laborers recruited for sugar plantations in the early 20th century and became classified as an invasive species there. The visualizer also highlights the Puerto Rican crested toad (sapo concho), one of only two native amphibian species on the island that is not a coquí, which was believed extinct for over four decades before being rediscovered in the 1970s. Urbanization and coastal development have since eliminated the sapo concho population in northern Puerto Rico, while several coquí species face similar habitat loss from luxury housing construction and the effects of Hurricane Maria. The sapo concho also appears as the animated mascot Concho in the album's accompanying short film.

Bad Bunny wanted historical narratives to accompany each track's visualizer. Meléndez-Badillo, a historian of Puerto Rico at the University of Wisconsin, was recruited for the project after being contacted through Instagram. He described the collaboration as an effort to make Puerto Rican history accessible to both island residents and international audiences.

== Reception ==
=== Critical response ===
Pitchfork gave the song a dedicated track review, calling it "the ideological centerpiece" of Debí Tirar Más Fotos and "the brooding yin" to the "boisterous yang" of Bad Bunny's earlier song "El Apagón" from Un Verano Sin Ti (2022). Maya Georgi of Rolling Stone, in her five-star review of the album, highlighted the track as fusing "the poetic folk music from Puerto Rico's jíbaro people" with "taunting hip-hop percussion that makes every word sound like a warning." The Miami Hurricane called it "a powerful protest anthem that resonates deeply with Puerto Ricans fighting to preserve our identity and culture."

Biologist Rafael Joglar, a professor at the University of Puerto Rico and founder of the conservation group The Coquí Project, praised the song and album's ecological messaging, saying "Bad Bunny gave us a unique opportunity, and I hope our people know how to take advantage of it."

At the 26th Annual Latin Grammy Awards in 2025, it was nominated in the category of Best Roots Song, but lost to "Aguacero" by Luis Enrique and C4 Trío.

=== Cross-cultural impact ===
The song drew significant attention in Hawaii. Hawaiʻi Public Radio published multiple features exploring the parallels raised in the track. Native Hawaiian artist Daniel Kauwila Mahi said the song spoke to solidarity between the two island communities, noting that "for one of the most streamed, if not, the most streamed artist in the world, to talk about and politicize this issue [...] in ways that a lot of us have been trying to do for many years" was significant. Rudy Guevarra Jr., a professor of Asian Pacific American studies at Arizona State University and author of Aloha Compadre: Latinos in Hawaiʻi, connected the song to the history of Puerto Rican migration to Hawaii's sugar plantations beginning in 1901.

The academic journal The Conversation published an analysis of the song in the context of global overtourism, noting that its themes resonated in regions as distant as the Canary Islands and the Balearic Islands in Spain, where communities face similar displacement pressures from mass tourism.

=== Commercial performance ===
Like the rest of the tracks on Debí Tirar Más Fotos, "Lo Que Le Pasó a Hawaii" debuted at number 94 on the US Billboard Hot 100, on the issue dated January 18, 2025. On the same issue, the track debuted at number 19 on the US Hot Latin Songs chart. The song later peaked at numbers 62 and 15 on both respective charts. It also received a gold certification in Spain by Productores de Música de España (Promusicae).

== Live performances ==
=== No Me Quiero Ir de Aquí residency ===
During Bad Bunny's No Me Quiero Ir de Aquí residency at the Coliseo de Puerto Rico from July to September 2025, the song became a signature moment of each show. Rather than performing it himself, Bad Bunny invited a different Puerto Rican artist to perform the song at each Sunday concert, with guest performers seated in a white plastic chair styled after the album cover. El Nuevo Día named this rotating guest tradition one of the twelve best moments of the residency.

Pedro Capó was the first artist to perform the song on July 13, 2025, the opening weekend of the residency. Subsequent guest performers included Ednita Nazario, Farruko, Willy Rodríguez of Cultura Profética, Kany García, iLe, Tito Auger of Fiel a la Vega, Luis Fonsi, and Lorén Aldarondo of Chuwi.

iLe's August 17 performance was notable for her outfit, designed by Dani Fabrizi and inspired by Puerto Rican nationalist leader Lolita Lebrón. Luis Fonsi later described the experience on social media, writing that he "sang with a lump in my throat", while Bad Bunny told him backstage, "It's an honor to hear your voice in that song." In a Billboard interview, Residente noted that inviting Fonsi to sing the politically charged song was "unexpected" given "the genre differences", to which Bad Bunny responded: "I wanted everyone to feel like they were part of this, no matter their background."

Fans had widely requested Andrés Jiménez, known as "El Jíbaro", on social media throughout the residency. Jiménez performed the song on September 14, 2025, during the 30th and penultimate official date of the residency. Afterward, he wrote on social media: "Thank you Benito, for giving the new generations a roadmap to finding their identity. Land, blood, and common destiny."

=== Super Bowl LX halftime show ===
Ricky Martin performed this song during Bad Bunny's Super Bowl halftime show on February 8, 2026. Martin sat in a white plastic chair in front of a plantain tree, recreating imagery from the Debí Tirar Más Fotos album cover. Behind him, performers dressed as jíbaros in pavas climbed electric poles that exploded, symbolic of Puerto Rico's frequent blackouts and failing power grid under LUMA Energy. The performance segued directly into "El Apagón".

== Charts ==
=== Weekly charts ===
Weekly chart performance for "Lo Que Le Pasó a Hawaii"
Chart (2025–2026)	Peak position
Argentina Hot 100 (Billboard)	80
Canada Hot 100 (Billboard)	95
France (SNEP)	77
Global 200 (Billboard)	43
Greece International (IFPI)	17
Spain (Promusicae)	23
US Billboard Hot 100	62
US Hot Latin Songs (Billboard)	15
US Hot Tropical Songs (Billboard)	5

=== Year-end charts ===
Year-end chart performance for "Lo Que Le Pasó a Hawaii"
Chart (2025)	Position
US Hot Latin Songs (Billboard)	72

== Certifications ==
Certifications and sales for "Lo Que Le Pasó a Hawaii"
Region	Certification	Certified units/sales
France (SNEP)	Gold	100,000^{‡}
Portugal (AFP)	Gold	12,000^{‡}
Spain (Promusicae)	Gold	30,000^{‡}
^{‡} Sales+streaming figures based on certification alone.
