= Roselyn Sánchez =

Puerto Rican actress (born 1973)

- Sánchez at the 2026 Latin Grammy Awards
- Born: Roselyn Milagros Sánchez Rodríguez; April 2, 1973 (age 53); San Juan, Puerto Rico
- Occupation: Actress
- Years active: 1992–present
- Spouses: Gary Stretch (m. 1998; div. 2001) Eric Winter (m. 2008)
- Children: 2

Roselyn Milagros Sánchez Rodríguez (born April 2, 1973) is a Puerto Rican actress. On television, she is best known for her roles as Elena Delgado on the CBS police procedural Without a Trace (2005–2009), as Carmen Luna on the Lifetime comedy-drama Devious Maids (2013–2016), and as Elena Roarke on the new Fantasy Island (2021–2023). In film, Sánchez has appeared in Rush Hour 2 (2001), Boat Trip (2002), The Game Plan (2007), and Act of Valor (2012).

== Early life ==
Sánchez was born in San Juan, Puerto Rico, and is the youngest of four siblings, having three older brothers. She received her primary education in San Juan. At a young age, she showed an interest in both dancing and acting and would put on shows for her family. Sánchez enrolled in the University of Puerto Rico, where like her father and brothers she was to study marketing. However, after three years she left the course. In 1991, at the age of eighteen, Sánchez moved to New York City, where she took classes in dancing, acting and singing. She returned to Puerto Rico and, in 1992, she made her movie debut, having landed a small part as an island girl in the movie Captain Ron, which was partly filmed in Puerto Rico.

== Career ==
In Puerto Rico, Sánchez gained public attention as a dancer and as co-host of a variety show called Qué Vacilón. At that time, in 1993, Sánchez won the Miss Puerto Rico Petite contest and, in 1994, she won the international title of Miss American Petite, bringing her international fame. Sánchez has been named in numerous annual lists of beautiful women including Maxim Magazine's "Hot 100" in 2001, 2002 and 2006; AskMen.com's "Top 99 Most Desirable Women" in 2005 and 2006; and FHM's "100 Sexiest Women" in 2005 and 2006.

In 2001, Sánchez was cast as Isabella Molina, an undercover United States Secret Service agent who was Jackie Chan's love interest in the hit movie Rush Hour 2. In 2003, she played the role of Lorena in the movie Chasing Papi, starring alongside Jaci Velasquez and Sofia Vergara. Sánchez has acted in some 20 movies, including as Maria in Edison and as Karen Lopez in Underclassman. She starred in the Puerto Rican film Cayo, released in 2005.

In 2003, her first musical recording, Borinqueña, was released. The album's first single, "Amor Amor", gained a lot of attention as well as a Latin Grammy nomination for Best Music Video. She appeared in Craig David's music videos "Hidden Agenda" and "Personal", and in the Fabolous video for the song "Make Me Better".

In the fall of 2005, Sánchez joined the cast of the CBS television series Without a Trace, where she played Agent Elena Delgado to 2009. She composed the musical Yellow, about a singer/dancer/actress who leaves Puerto Rico to hit the big time in New York, in which she played the principal part. The movie was filmed in 2005 and released in 2007. Also in 2007, she acted as Monique, the ballet teacher, in The Game Plan, and in 2009, starred in The Perfect Sleep, a neo-noir drama, co-starring Patrick Bauchau, Tony Amendola, Isaac Singleton, and Peter Lucas. In 2011, Sánchez made a guest appearance on TNT's Rizzoli & Isles, playing villainous attorney Valerie Delgado.

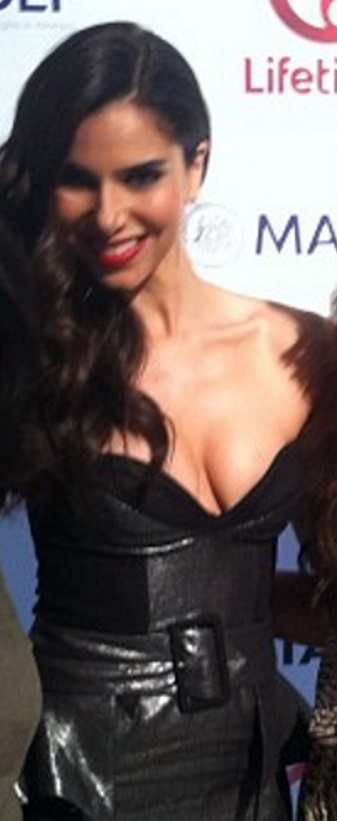
Sánchez attending a Devious Maids screening (2013)

In 2012, Sánchez was cast opposite Ana Ortiz of ABC comedy-drama pilot Devious Maids, created by Marc Cherry. On May 14, 2012, the pilot was not picked to series by ABC for the 2012–13 United States network schedule. However, on June 22, 2012, Lifetime picked up the pilot with a thirteen-episode order. The series premiered June 23, 2013 on Lifetime.

== Personal life ==
From August 9, 1998, to April 15, 2001, Sanchez was married to English actor, former boxer, and former model Gary Stretch. After her divorce, she started a relationship with Puerto Rican salsa singer Víctor Manuelle. In December 2005, she announced that she had ended their relationship.

Sánchez became engaged to actor Eric Winter in December 2007 after two years of dating and they married on 29 November 2008, in San Juan, Puerto Rico. Sánchez gave birth to their daughter in January 2012 (she suffered a miscarriage which resulted in the loss of her daughter's twin early in her pregnancy). The couple had a son in November 2017. Both children were conceived with the help of IVF.

Sánchez has spoken openly about her struggles with endometriosis and infertility while trying to get pregnant later in life.

Sánchez is the spokesperson of the Fundación de Niños San Jorge, which assists sick children from poor families.

== Filmography ==
=== Film ===
Year	Title	Role	Notes
1992	Captain Ron	Clarise the Island Girl	
1999	Held Up	Trina	
2001	Rush Hour 2	Isabella Molina	
2002	Boat Trip	Gabriella	
2002	Nightstalker	Gabriella Martinez	
2003	Basic	Nunez	
2003	Chasing Papi	Lorena	
2004	Larceny	Angela	
2005	State Property 2	D.A.	
2005	Edison	Maria	
2005	Underclassman	Karen Lopez	
2005	Cayo	Young Julia	
2005	Shooting Gallery	Jezebel Black	Video
2006	Yellow	Amaryllis Campos	
2007	The Game Plan	Monique Vasquez	
2009	The Perfect Sleep	Porphyria	
2010	Venus & Vegas	Kristen	
2012	Act of Valor	Morales	
2016	Death of a Vegas Showgirl	Debbie Flores-Narvaez	TV movie
2018	Traffik	Malia	
2019	A Taste of Summer	Gabby Ferrar	TV movie
2020	Satos	Carolina	Short
2021	An Ice Wine Christmas	Camila Ruiz	TV movie
2023	Gringa	Elsa	
2024	Wallbanger	Jillian	
2025	Undercard	TBA	
TBA	The Third Parent	Megan Hollow	Post-production

=== Television ===
Year	Title	Role	Notes
1996–97	As the World Turns	Pilar Domingo	Regular cast
1997–98	Fame L.A.	Lili Arguelo	Main cast
1999	Ryan Caulfield: Year One	Kim Veras	Main cast
2000	Nash Bridges	Belinda Cruz	Recurring cast (season 6)
2002	In-Laws	Dani	Episode: "If You Can't Stand the Heat"
2002	The Drew Carey Show	Maria	Episode: "Drew Tries Hot Salsa"
2003–04	L.A. Dragnet	Det. Elana Macias	Recurring cast (season 2)
2005	Kojak	ADA Carmen Warrick	Main cast
2005–09	Without a Trace	Elena Delgado	Main cast (seasons 4–7)
2009	Royal Pains	Sofia Santos	Episode: "Crazy Love"
2011	Rizzoli & Isles	A.D.A Valerie Delgado	Episode: "Can I Get a Witness?"
2012	Desperate Housewives	Carmen	Uncredited; episode: "Finishing the Hat"
2013	Newsreaders	Flavia Acai	Episode: "Pubic Hair Crisis"
2013–16	Devious Maids	Carmen Luna	Main cast
2014	Familia En Venta	Lili	Main cast
2016	Telenovela	Reporter	Episode: "The Hurricane"
2019	Grand Hotel	Gigi Mendoza	Main cast
2020	The Rookie	Valerie castillo	Episode: "The Overnight"
2021–22	Home Economics	Sofía	Recurring cast (season 2)
2021–23	Fantasy Island	Elena Roarke	Main cast
2022	'Til Jail Do Us Part	Sofía Estrella	Main cast
2025	Leanne	Vanessa Gomez	Episode: "Gomez Is a Woman"

=== Video games ===
Year	Title	Role	Notes
2026	Grand Theft Auto VI	Mia Caminos	

=== Music videos ===
Year	Title	Artist	Role
2003	Hidden Agenda	Craig David	Model
2007	Make Me Better	Fabolous ft. Ne-Yo	Love interest
2013	Loco	Enrique Iglesias ft. Romeo Santos	Herself

== Discography ==
- 2003: Borinqueña

=== Singles ===
Year	Single	Peak chart positions					Album(s)
Year	Single	U.S. Hot 100	U.S. Hot Latin	U.S. Tropical /Salsa	U.S. Tropical	U.S. Latin Pop	Album(s)
2003	"Amor Amor" (feat. Tego Calderón)	—	38	—	6	32	Borinqueña
2003	"Noche De Verano" (feat. Víctor Manuelle)	—	—	—	—	—	Borinqueña

== Accolades ==
Year	Association	Category	Work	Result
1998	ALMA Awards	Outstanding Individual Performance in a Nationally Syndicated Drama Series	Fame L.A. (1997)	Nominated
2002	ALMA Awards	Outstanding Supporting Actress in a Motion Picture	Rush Hour 2	Nominated
2004	Fangoria Chainsaw Awards	Best Actress	Nightstalker	Nominated
2004	Latin Grammy Awards	Best Music Video	Amor Amor	Nominated
2006	Black Reel Awards	Black Reel Award for Best Actress – Television	Kojak	Nominated
2007	NAACP Image Awards	Outstanding Actress in a Drama Series	Without a Trace	Nominated
2007	ALMA Awards	Outstanding Supporting Actress - Television Series	Without a Trace	Nominated
2008	ALMA Awards	Outstanding Actress in a Drama Television Series	Without a Trace	Won
2009	ALMA Awards	Year in TV Drama Actress	Without a Trace	Nominated
2012	ALMA Awards	ALMA Award for Favorite Movie Actress - Drama/Adventure	Act of Valor	Nominated
2014	Imagen Award	Imagen Award for Best Actress - Television	Devious Maids	Nominated
2015	Imagen Award	Imagen Award for Best Actress - Television	Devious Maids	Nominated
2018	Raul Julia Foundation Awards	Contribution Achievement Award	—N/a	Won

== See also ==
- List of Puerto Ricans
