= The Underdog/El Subestimado =

2006 studio album by Tego Calderón

Studio album by Tego Calderón
- Released: August 29, 2006
- Genres: Hip-hop; Reggae; Reggaeton
- Length: 71:22
- Labels: Jiggiri Records; Atlantic Records
- Producers: Luny Tunes; Tainy

Tego Calderón chronology
El Enemy de los Guasíbiri (2004)	The Underdog/El Subestimado (2006)	El Abayarde Contraataca (2007)

Singles from The Underdog/El Subestimado
- 1. "Los Maté" Released: August 15, 2006; 2. "Chillin'" Released: October 20, 2006

Professional ratings
Review scores
Source	Rating
AllMusic	3/5 stars
Music For America	(favorable)
Okayplayer	4/5 stars

The Underdog/El Subestimado is the second studio album by Tego Calderón on August 29, 2006. The first single of the album was titled "Los Maté" ("I Killed Them"), which has garnered much air-play on the radio. During a press conference in Puerto Rico, Tego Calderón expressed that this new album is "a diary of sorts from my experiences. There are happy moments and sad ones".

This time around, Tego decided not to use as much reggaeton and focus more on hip-hop. He is also a fan of salsa, blues, funk and reggae (the second single of the album, "Chillin'", is a reggae song completely in Spanish) and he incorporates these styles in the album. Because of this, many fans were surprised, as they expected classic reggaeton. The album garnered points in originality, making it stand out more than Daddy Yankee's Barrio Fino en Directo and Don Omar's King of Kings.

The album debut at 43 on Billboard 200 and at the Top of Us Latin Rhythm Album Chart. As of 2011, it sold 99,000 units in the United States.

== Background ==
The Underdog/El Subestimado is Tego's third album distributed by Atlantic Records. Tego decided to mix both reggaeton and hip-hop for this album's sound. He also has two songs influenced by African drums on the interludes ("¿Por Qué?" and "Son Dos Alas"). The second single, "Chillin'", is a pure reggae song.

Two songs on the album have been influenced by salsa. "Llora, Llora" had a lot of airplay, and it features the Venezuelan salsa star, Oscar D'León. The song "Chango Blanco" was also influenced by salsa, and has more of a salsa sound than "Llora, Llora", though Oscar D'Leon is featured on it.

The song "Slo Mo'" was featured in Tego's first film called Illegal Tender. This song has the chorus sang in English, and some parts of the first and second verse sang is English. "Mardi Gras" is influenced by blues music. Also, Tego Calderon's songs "Llévatelo Todo" and "Burreo, Burreo" have been influenced by jazz music.

== Release and promotion ==
The first single from the album, titled "Los Maté", had a lot of airplay when released, and its lyrics reflect the album. The music video for "Los Maté" was watched a lot on both Spanish and English channels. "Los Maté" was the promotional single for the album.

The second single, "Chillin'" also had a lot of airplay. The music video was watched on channels including: MTV, MTV Tr3s, BET, VH1, and many others.

=== Promotional mixtape ===
A street mixtape was released with the album for promotion. The album includes songs that didn't end up being on the album, songs that Tego was featured, and songs by the new artist in his label, Chyno Nyno.

==== Mixtape track listing ====
1. "Intro"
2. "Ven Mamita"
3. "Gangsta Shit" (Tony Touch feat. Tego Calderon)
4. "Skit"
5. "Mueve"
6. "Street Mix" (Chyno Nyno)
7. "Skit"
8. "Mi Mama Me Dijo" (feat. The Game)
9. "Chyno" (Chyno Nyno)
10. "Skit"
11. "Los Negritos"
12. "Trangalanga"
13. "Acapelas 4 the DJ"

=== Japan release ===
Tego Calderon released a Japan album packing version of his album with Atlantic Records. If you buy it in the United States, the album costs more than forty dollars. This release was made because Tego had a lot of copies sold in Japan for his album.

== Track listing ==
1. "¿Cómo Me Llamo Yo?"
2. "Los Maté"
3. "Mardi Gras"
4. "Slo Mo'"
5. "Pon La Cara"
6. "Payaso (Interlude)"
7. "Payaso" (featuring Julio Voltio & Eddie Dee)
8. "Comprenderás"
9. "Llora, Llora" (featuring Oscar D'León)
10. "Chillin'" (featuring Don Omar)
11. "Veo, Veo"
12. "Oh Dios"
13. "Extremidades"
14. "Son Dos Alas (Interlude)"
15. "Chango Blanco"
16. "A Mi Papá"
17. "Cuando Baila Reggaeton" (featuring Yandel) (Produced by Luny Tunes & Tainy, Joker)
18. "Bureo, Bureo"
19. "¿Por Qué? (Interlude)"
20. "Llévatelo Todo"
21. "Bad Man" (featuring Buju Banton)
22. "Mil Cosas" (Featured in EA Sports game NBA Live 06)
23. "Llegó El Chynyn" (featuring Chyno Nyno)

=== Japan edition ===
24. "Tu Comprenderás"

=== Target exclusive CD ===
1. "Tú Comprenderás"
2. "Ven Mamita"
3. "Vámonos del Club" (featuring Zion)
4. "T-T-T-Tego"

== Nominations and charts ==
The Underdog/El Subestimado was nominated for the 2006 Latin Grammy Awards for "Best Latin Rock Album".

=== Charts ===
Chart (2007)	Peak position
U.S. Billboard 200	43
U.S. Billboard Top Latin Albums	2
U.S. Billboard Latin Rhythm Albums	1
U.S. Billboard Top Rap Albums	10

== Personnel ==
Credits adapted from AllMusic

- Percussion, Vocals - Alfredo Hernandez
- Composer - Armando Rosario
- Photography - Blasius Erlinger
- Primary Artist - Buju Banton
- Coros - Cano Estremera
- Bongos - Carlos Pabon
- Creative Director, Design - Carlos Perez
- Engineer, Guiro - Carlos Rodriguez
- Guest Artist - Chino Nino
- Mastering - Chris Athens
- Musician, Producer - Cookee
- Composer, Engineer - Corey Hill
- Composer, Drum Programming, Engineer - Corey Jackson Hill
- Composer - Daniel Cruz
- Producer - Danny Fornaris
- Piano - Desmar Guevara
- Mixing - DJ Flat
- Composer, Keyboards, Percussion, Timbales - Domingo Ramos
- Primary Artist - Don Omar
- Producer - Echo & Diesel
- Primary Artist - Eddie Dee
- Maracas - Eddie Temporal
- Composer, Producer - Eduardo Lobo
- Guitar - Fernando Perdomo
- Engineer, Mixing, Musician, Producer - Francisco Saldana
- Mixing - Gary Noble
- Engineer - Jesus "Chuy" Garcia
- Bass - John Benitez
- Trumpet - Jose Sibaja
- Project Coordinator - Kenya Calderon
- Musician - Kevin Douglas Wright
- Bongos - Luisito Quintero
- Vocals - Marger Sealey
- Composer - Mark Myrie
- Assistant - Mike Peters
- Composer, Primary Artist - Oscar D'Leon
- Trombone - Ozzie Melendez
- Mixing - Papo Sanchez
- Engineer, Producer - Parallaxt3s
- Composer, Engineer - Paul Irizarry
- Coros - Rafael De Jesus
- Graphic Design - Raul Justiniano
- Coros - Ray De La Perez
- Trombone - Renaldo Jorge
- Congas - Richie Flores
- Keyboards - Salaam Remi
- Composer - Siedah Garrett
- Bongos, Cajon, Congas, Executive Producer, Percussion, Primary Artist, Producer - Tego Calderon
- Composer - Troy Rami
- Engineer, Musician, Producer - Troyton Rami
- Primary Artist - Voltio
- Composer, Engineer, Mixing, Musician, Producer - Victor Cabrera
