= Desiree Perez =

American businessperson

- Born: New York City, U.S.
- Title: Chief Executive Officer of Roc Nation
- Spouse: Juan Perez

Desiree Perez is an American businesswoman. She is the chief executive officer and co-founder of Roc Nation. Formerly, she served as the company's chief operating officer for ten years and played a role in the company's management of music, film, television, and sports entities.

== Early life and education ==
Born to Cuban immigrant parents, Perez was raised in the Bronx borough of New York City. She became fluent in both Spanish and English.

== Career ==
=== Early career ===
Perez had her first job as a teenager for her father's moving company. Her roles included translating between Spanish and English to help sell company services.

Early in her professional career, she ran company that sold cellphones. In this position, Perez encountered an opportunity to work in promotions for a Washington Heights nightclub. In the following fifteen years, she managed several clubs.

=== Early partnership with Jay-Z ===
After booking a then up-and-coming Jay-Z at one of her nightclubs in 1996, Perez entered into a professional friendship that would result in many years of collaboration. Early in their collaborative years, they worked together at Baseline Studios. In 2003, they, alongside Perez's husband, Juan, opened the 40/40 Club in New York City. Perez served as Director of Operations for the club, which subsequently opened locations in Atlantic City, Las Vegas, and Brooklyn, New York.

=== Roc Nation ===
In 2008, Perez joined Jay-Z and three other founders to establish Roc Nation. Perez joined the team as chief operations officer and co-founder. She served as COO until 2019, when she was named chief executive officer of the company, succeeding Jay Brown.

As CEO, Perez gained oversight of all Roc Nation offerings, including music and music publication, touring, publishing, film, television, talent management, apparel, and philanthropy.

=== Television and film ===
Perez has worked on television and film projects as executive producer, including Super Bowl Halftime Show productions, documentaries featuring Beyoncé and Jay-Z, Megan Thee Stallion, and an exposé on the Mississippi correctional system.

== Accolades and recognition ==
In 2019, Perez received the Billboard Women in Music Executive of the Year Award. She was a Variety 500 Honoree for women's impact two years later.

As part of Roc Nation, Perez, Jay-Z, and Jay Brown were named 2021 Change Agents by Billboard magazine for working against racial injustice. She appeared on the Billboard Power 100 in 2026.

In 2022, she was listed on Entrepreneur's 100 Women of Influence list. Also in 2022, she received the Community Quarterback Award at United Way New York City's Gridiron Gala.

In 2023, Perez was listed as a Variety 500 Honoree for women's impact. She also appeared on The Hollywood Reporter's Top 55 Most Powerful Latin Players in Film, TV, and Music.

Perez won an Emmy for Outstanding Variety Special (Live) for her work producing the 2022 Super Bowl Halftime Show. She also received nominations for the 2021, 2023, 2024, and 2025 Super Bowl Halftime Shows. Additionally, she received an Emmy nomination for Outstanding Special Class Program for her work as executive producer on the documentary Beyoncé and Jay-Z on the Run in 2015.

== Philanthropy ==
In 2018, Perez was one of a number of female music executives who wrote an open letter to the Recording Academy asking for increased diversity of women in the music industry. The letter was in response to a comment from former Recording Academy chairman, Neil Portnow, that asserted female music executives needed to step up in the industry.

In early 2020, Perez led efforts to help over 150 inmates sue over inhumane conditions at Parchman Prison. She also executive produced the documentary Exposing Parchman on A&E in 2023, spotlighting prison reform.

In November 2021, Perez helped organize the Madison Square Garden Job Fair, which drew over 6,000 attendees—including formerly incarcerated individuals—and provided resume support, legal aid for expungements, professional attire, and on-site interviews with major employers.

As a longtime board member of Reform Alliance, Perez is involved in efforts to transform probation and parole systems. She also supports Meek Mill's legal team and broader criminal justice reform campaigns.

=== Roc Nation ===
Through her work with Roc Nation, Perez has led company-wide philanthropic initiatives, largely on women's diversity and equality, as well as criminal justice reform.

In 2018, Roc Nation launched Team Roc, an initiative Perez oversees as chief executive officer. Through the Team Roc division, Perez has guided Roc Nation in its work to support educational efforts and families of victims of police brutality.

Under Perez's leadership, Roc Nation signed a deal with the NFL regarding social justice initiatives and live entertainment. Following this partnership, Perez aimed to use the opportunity to shed light on social injustices.

By 2021, Perez assisted in launching the Roc Nation School of Music, Sports, and Entertainment at Long Island University.

== Board memberships ==
Perez is on the board of several non-profits, including Reform Alliance, United Justice Coalition, and the Parent Company.

== Personal life ==
In 1994, Perez was arrested for conspiracy to distribute narcotics.

She received a sentence of five years probation, but was later charged with violating her parole. The violation led to nine months in prison in 1999.

In 2021, then-president Donald Trump pardoned Perez of the charges, citing her efforts to "turn her life around." Following the pardon, Perez expressed her gratitude.

Perez is married to the co-founder and President of Roc Nation Sports, Juan Perez. The couple reside in New York City.
