= Pa' Que Retozen =

Song by Tego Calderón

from the album El Abayarde
- Released: December 3, 2002
- Genre: Reggaeton
- Songwriters: Tegui Calderón Rosario; Elias de León; Joselly Rosario
- Producer: DJ Joe

"Pa' Que Retozen" (translation "So They Can Frolic") is a reggaeton song performed by the Puerto Rican singer Tego Calderón. It was released in December 3, 2002 as a track on the album El Abayarde and later as a single. In October 2025, the song was ranked at No. 245 on the Rolling Stone list of "The 250 Greatest Songs of the 21st Century So Far".
