= Illegal Tender (film) =

2007 crime film directed by Franc. Reyes

- Theatrical release poster
- Directed by: Franc. Reyes
- Written by: Franc. Reyes
- Produced by: John Singleton
- Starring: Rick Gonzalez; Wanda De Jesus; Dania Ramirez
- Cinematography: Frank Byers
- Edited by: Tony Ciccone
- Music by: Heitor Pereira
- Production company: New Deal Entertainment
- Distributed by: Universal Pictures
- Release date: August 24, 2007
- Running time: 107 minutes
- Language: English
- Box office: $3.1 million

Illegal Tender is a 2007 American crime film written and directed by Franc. Reyes and produced by John Singleton. It stars Rick Gonzalez, Wanda De Jesus and Dania Ramirez. It also marks the film debut of Reggaeton music star Tego Calderón.

== Plot ==
In 1985, Bronx, New York, where Millie and Wilson De Leon are expecting their first child. Wilson is a drug dealer working for Javier Cordero. One night, Millie shows Wilson that she has laundered his illegal drug earnings and made high quality investments, eliminating the need for him to continue his life of crime. Wilson goes to a meeting with Javier, who has him killed at the same time that Wilson Jr. is born.

In 2006, Connecticut. Millie and Wilson Jr., along with Millie's grade school son Randy, are living in a mansion in Connecticut. Wilson Jr. is in college with an adoring girlfriend named Ana. Wilson Jr. has a difficult relationship with his mother, bothered by the fact that she has multiple boyfriends. After seeing a former friend from her past in a grocery store, Millie tells Randy that they must leave immediately. A heated argument ensues, with Millie finally telling Wilson Jr. that his father was a drug dealer, that Javier is still looking for her, and revealing a hidden stockpile of guns. Wilson is unbowed and stays in the mansion with Ana. That night, Wilson Jr. engages in a massive gunfight with two assassins who attack the house, which does not attract any attention from neighbors nor the police. Despite the gunfight and obvious danger from Javier, Millie decides it is safe for her and Randy to move back to the mansion. The family later see a suspicious man watching them while playing at a nearby park.

Wilson Jr., without telling Millie, travels to San Juan, Puerto Rico. He visits his Aunt Jessenia, who tells him that he can find Javier at a nightclub called "Mora's". Javier tells him that his mother stole $2 Million USD from him, has his thugs beat Wilson Jr. and drop him back at his hotel. Upon returning to Connecticut, Wilson finally questions the family's lavish lifestyle. Millie shows her son the investments made, including an unusually astute early investment in Microsoft. Wilson then admits to his meeting with Javier to which Millie becomes infuriated, knowing it was a trick so that Javier could track them down (despite the assassins who had already found them earlier at their mansion). The three De Leon's find themselves in another massive gunfight at their mansion with two more assassins, including the man from the park, who knew how to find them before Wilson Jr.'s trip to San Juan. After another shootout, Millie and Wilson kill their attackers.

Despite the massive shootout at the mansion and the two dead men, the Connecticut police are satisfied that it is a meaningless case of unprovoked home invasion, and Millie and Wilson Jr. are able to travel to Puerto Rico to confront Javier. Wilson Jr. returns to "Mora's", where Javier reveals the truth about Wilson Sr. In 1983, Javier had asked Wilson to look after his 15-year-old sister Mora (for whom the nightclub is named). Instead, the married, adult Wilson Sr. began an affair with the underaged Mora, eventually impregnating her in 1985 (at 17) while Millie was already pregnant with Wilson Jr. Mora had called her brother and explained the affair and her pregnancy, expressing her love for Wilson Sr. but knowing that his love for Millie would keep them apart. Mora then committed suicide. Javier had Wilson Sr. killed, hoping he would find relief for the statutory rape and death of his sister.

Javier states that Wilson Sr.'s death left him dissatisfied, and will now kill Wilson Jr., but Millie enters the room and shoots Javier dead. Javier's number two, Choco, lets them leave after a brief thanks for handing him control of Javier's crime empire. When Millie asks Wilson Jr. why Javier killed Wilson Sr., he doesn't tell her about the affair with Mora, saying instead that it was about the stolen $2 million.

== Cast ==
- Rick Gonzalez as Wilson De Leon Jr.
- Wanda De Jesus as Millie De Leon (in 2006)
- Dania Ramirez as Ana
- Delilah Cotto as Jessenia (in 2006)
- Zulay Henao as Mora Cordero
- Carmen Perez as Sonia
- Gary Perez as Javier Cordero
- Manny Pérez as Wilson De Leon Sr.
- Tego Calderón as "Choco"
- Miguel Angel Suarez as Salomon
- Julie Carmen as Nilsa

== Music ==
A soundtrack for the film was released to promote the film. It's only available on iTunes, and it includes one song by Tego Calderón, Ava-Mae Curah, Tafari and boasts production by Grammy winning reggae producer Tony Kelly.

== Reception ==
The film earned $3.1 million in U.S. theaters. The film received mostly negative reviews. Review aggregator Rotten Tomatoes reports that only 16% of 49 critics gave the film a positive review, with a rating average of 4 out of 10. The site's consensus is that "Lackluster acting and a ridiculous plot make the over-the-top Illegal Tender an unrealistic bust." On Metacritic, which assigns a weighted mean rating out of 100 reviews from film critics, the film has a "mixed or average" rating score of 40 based on 18 reviews.
