= Franc Reyes (film director) =

American filmmaker

Franc. Reyes
- Born: 1961 (age 64–65); New York, New York
- Occupations: Film director, producer, screenwriter, dancer, choreographer
- Years active: 2002–present

Franc Reyes (usually stylized as Franc. Reyes) is an American film director, screenwriter, producer, dancer and choreographer of Puerto Rican descent. In 2002 he won the ALMA Award for Emerging Filmmaker. Films he has directed include Empire, which opened the New York International Latino Film Festival, and Illegal Tender.

== Films ==
| Year | Film | Credited as | | | |
| Year | Film | Director | Producer | Writer | Other |
|---|---|---|---|---|---|
| 2002 | Empire | Yes | | Yes | Premiered at the 2002 Sundance Film Festival. Grossed $18 million worldwide. Described by The New York Times as "a gritty urban thriller." |
| 2005 | Beauty | | | Yes | |
| 2007 | Illegal Tender | Yes | | Yes | |
| 2009 | The Ministers | Yes | Yes | Yes | Notes: Independent crime thriller set in New York City. Released by Silver Nitrate Films. |
| 2023 | Gun Hill | Yes | Yes | Yes | |

== Television ==
- The O.C. (2006, Episode: "The Dawn Patrol"), Director
