= Cesar Ruiz =

Cesar Ruiz may refer to:

- César Ruiz (footballer) (born 1990), Peruvian footballer
- César Ruiz (athlete) (born 1995), Cuban sprinter
- César Ruiz Aquino, Filipino poet
- Cesar Ruiz (American football) (born 1999), American football offensive linemen
