= El Enemy de los Guasíbiri =

Compilation album by Tego Calderón
- Released: January 13, 2004
- Genre: Reggaeton, hip hop
- Producer: Noriega; DJ Goldy; DJ Blass; Luny Tunes; Aventura; DJ Danny & Optix; DJ Adam; Maestro; Echo; The Majestic

Tego Calderón chronology
El Abayarde (2003)	El Enemy de los Guasíbiri (2004)	The Underdog/El Subestimado (2006)

Professional ratings
Review scores
Source	Rating
Allmusic	3/5 stars
Rolling Stone	3/5 stars

El Enemy de los Guasíbiri is the first compilation album by Tego Calderón. The album is considered to be an important factor to reggaeton's mainstream exposure in 2004 alongside Daddy Yankee's Barrio Fino and Ivy Queen's Diva. The title of the album is taken from a line in his 2003 song “Pa' que retozen. This production contains "Guasa Guasa Remix" with Voltio; one of the best 'tiraeras' from the history of reggaeton, for the Lito & Polaco and Pina Records. The album sold over 200,000 units in Puerto Rico and United States.

== Track listing ==
1. Intro
2. Elegante de Boutique (Boricuas NY)
3. Gatas Gozan (Sopranos: First Season)
4. Cosa Buena (Planet Reggae)
5. Mi Entierro (La Mision 2)
6. Cerca de Mi Neighborhood (Boricuas NY 2)
7. Guasa Guasa (feat. Voltio)
8. Al Natural (feat. Yandel)
9. Interlude
10. Naki Naki (Kilates: Rompiendo El Silencio)
11. We Got the Crown "Envidia" (feat. Aventura)
12. Sopa de Letras (Babilonia)
13. En Peligro de Extinción (feat. Eddie Dee) ^{A}
14. Baílalo Como Tú Quieras (Los Matadores Del Genero)
15. Dame Un Chance (The Majestic)
16. No Paso El Cerdo (La Mision 3: A Otro Nivel)
17. No Sufras Por Ella (feat. Toño Rosario)

A. This track originally appeared on Eddie Dee's El Terrorista De La Lírica (2000) album.

- The majority of these songs were released on compilation albums before Tego's record deal with Sony BMG cited in parentheses.

== Charts ==
Chart (2003–04)	Peak position
Dominican Albums (Musicalia)	10
US Heatseeker Albums (Billboard)	14
US Latin Albums (Billboard)	5
US Latin Pop Albums (Billboard)	4
US Tropical Albums (Billboard)	9
