= El Abayarde =

Studio album by Tego Calderón
- Released: November 1, 2002
- Recorded: 2001–2002
- Genres: Hip hop; reggaeton
- Label: White Lion Records
- Producers: Luny Tunes; Noriega; DJ Joe; Rafy Mercenario; Coo-Kee; DJ Nelson; Echo; Maestro

Tego Calderón chronology
El Abayarde (2002)	El Enemy de los Guasíbiri (2004)

Singles from El Abayarde
- 1. "Abayarde" Released: 2003; 2. "Pa' Que Retozen" Released: 2003; 3. "Cambumbo" Released: 2003; 4. "Guasa Guasa" Released: 2003; 5. "Al Natural" Released: 2003

El Abayarde is the debut studio album by the Puerto Rican rapper Tego Calderón. It included the singles "Pa' Que Retozen", "Guasa Guasa" and "Al Natural". It was released in 2002 through White Lion Records selling over 50,000 copies its first week between Puerto Rico and some parts of the United States. It would eventually be internationally distributed by Sony BMG in 2003. The album sold 132,000 copies in the US and more than 350,000 copies worldwide. El Abayarde was nominated for a Lo Nuestro Award for Urban Album of the Year and Best Rap/Hip Hop Album in the 4th Latin Grammy Awards in 2003.

== Background and Recording ==
The recording for Tego Calderon's "El Abayarde" began in 2001 when he signed to "White Lion Records". Record executive Elias De Leon had Tego participate in several Reggaeton compilation albums to create anticipation for "El Abayarde" including contributing "Cosa Buena" produced by DJ Blass for 2002's "Planet Reggae", a joint production between White Lion Records and Diamond Music. This work and others like "No Paso El Cerdo" from La Mision 3, “Naki Naki” from Kilates Rompiendo El Silencio, and “Sopa De Letras” from Babilonia El Imperio Comienza created great anticipation for the impending release of “El Abayarde”. The album sold 50,000 units in its first week of release.

Much of the themes explored within “El Abayarde” relate to the perspective of the Afro Caribbean diaspora as Tego emanates from Loiza, Puerto Rico. The album was hailed for its fusion of Rap & Reggaeton with traditional sounds of Salsa, Bomba, y Plena. The musical production was handled by Echo, DJ Joe, Rafy Mercenario, Maestro, Luny Tunes, Noriega & Coo-Kee. The album stood out by going beyond the prototypical Reggaeton party themes, including many songs with social commentary. It is now regarded as one of the most influential albums in Spanish Hip Hop and Reggaeton history.

== Album details ==
El Abayarde was one of the first reggaeton albums to be successful in the United States, and also of the genre. Having five singles released, it is the album with the most singles in Tego Calderon's career. The album took reggaeton to a new level, and revolutionized reggaeton in North America. The album features contributions by Eddie Dee, Luisma, and Maestro. The tracks were produced by Luny Tunes, DJ Nelson, Maestro, Rafy Mercenario, DJ Joe, DJ Adam, Echo and Coo-kee. This is Tego's debut album and was one of the albums that internationalized reggaeton. The singles include: "Abayarde", "Gracias", "Cambumbo" and "Pa' Que Retozen".

== Critical reception ==
El Abayarde is one of the albums that help revolutionized reggaeton worldwide, along with Daddy Yankee's Barrio Fino, Ivy Queen's Diva and Don Omar's The Last Don. It was the most purchased reggaeton album in Puerto Rico of that year, helping it break the record for the most sales as a reggaeton CD in its first week. The album is credited with introducing reggaeton to mainstream audiences in places like Houston, New York, Miami and Los Angeles in the United States. In 2024, a group of various music journalists from all over Latin America made a consensus where they ranked the album in position 15 on their list Los 600 de Latinoamérica considered as part of "The 600 essential albums for the history of Latin America." In 2025, Rolling Stone magazine ranked 125th in "The 250 Greatest Albums of the 21st Century So Far" list."

== Track listing ==
#	Title	Producer(s)	Featured guest(s)	Time
1	"Intro"	Noriega	Luisma	0:46
2	"Abayarde"	Maestro		3:22
3	"Al Natural"	Luny Tunes and Noriega		3:33
4	"Poquito"	Echo		3:03
5	"Pa' Que Retozen"	DJ Joe and Rafy Mercenario		2:31
6	"Interlude"			0:46
7	"Loiza"	DJ Adam		3:10
8	"No Me La Explota"	Coo-Kee and Gerardo Cruet	Eddie Dee	4:39
9	"Interlude"			0:34
10	"Guasa Guasa"	Luny Tunes & Noriega		4:00
11	"Dominicana"	DJ Nelson		4:12
12	"Cambumbo"	Coo-Kee		2:59
13	"Salte del Medio"	Echo		3:09
14	"Tus Ojos"		Maestro	3:59
15	"Los Difuntos"	Coo-Kee		3:05
16	"Lleva y Trae"	Luny Tunes and Noriega	Jessy	1:52
17	"Bonsai"	DJ Adam	Maestro	3:05
18	"Gracias"	Echo		4:24
19	"Planté Bandera"		Tempo Alomar	4:14

== Charts ==
Chart (2003)	Peak position
Dominican Albums (Musicalia)	5
US Heatseekers Albums (Billboard)	47
US Independent Albums (Billboard)	29
US Latin Albums (Billboard)	17
US Latin Pop Albums (Billboard)	11
Charts (2011)	Peak Position
Ecuadorian Albums (Musicalisimo)	15
