= El Abayarde Contraataca =

2007 studio album by Tego Calderón

Studio album by Tego Calderón
- Released: August 28, 2007
- Recorded: 2005–2006
- Genre: Reggaeton
- Label: Jiggiri; Warner Latina

Tego Calderón chronology
The Underdog/El Subestimado (2006)	El Abayarde Contraataca (2007)	El Que Sabe, Sabe (2015)

Singles from El Abayarde Contraataca
- 1. "Tradicional A Lo Bravo" Released: August 7, 2007; 2. "Quitarte To'" Released: October 16, 2007; 3. "Ni Fu Ni Fa" Released: January 15, 2008

El Abayarde Contraataca is the third studio album by Tego Calderón. It was released on August 28, 2007. The tracks in the album are a fusion of African and Caribbean rhythms, including salsa, merengue, Colombian and Venezuelan sounds. Tego's first single is "Tradicional A Lo Bravo", produced by Almonte and is proposed from his MySpace page. This album received a nomination for a Grammy Award for Best Latin Urban Album.

== Release and promotion ==
Tego Calderón released three singles for El Abayarde Contraataca, and they were all major singles. All three singles have music videos, though the "Quitarte To'" single didn't have as much airplay as the others. All three singles are available for digital download on iTunes, Amazon, Rhapsody, and other major retailer stores. Tego Calderón performed "Tradicional A Lo Bravo" live on Mi TRL, and got interviewed for the album.

== Background ==
As Tego Calderón stated, he wasn't too happy about making music on his previous album, The Underdog/El Subestimado, but when he made El Abayarde Contraataca, Tego was really happy about making music. To reflect that, the lyrical style of the album is mostly influenced by African sounds, and other things Tego likes. The musical style of the album also had African sounds, including the third single, "Ni Fu Ni Fa" Produced by Gabriel "Gabo" Lugo.

== Track listing ==
1. Alegría
2. Tradicional A Lo Bravo
3. Ni Fu Ni Fa
4. ¿Cuál Es el Plan y Eso? (featuring Residente Calle 13 and Yaviah)
5. Los Míos (featuring Pirulo)
6. Tú Pa' Mí
7. Quitarte To' (featuring Randy)
8. Lo Hecho Hecho Esta (featuring Chyno Nyno, Ñejo, Pirulo and Julio Voltio)
9. T-T-T Tego (remix)
10. El Que No Lucha No Avanza
11. Quiéreme como Soy (featuring Pirulo)
12. No Era por Ahí (featuring DJ Ricky)
13. Por Mi Madre
14. Envidia (featuring Aventura)

== Charts ==
Chart (2007)	Peak position
US Billboard 200	136
US Top Latin Albums (Billboard)	6
US Latin Rhythm Albums (Billboard)	1
US Top Rap Albums (Billboard)	21

== See also ==
- List of Billboard Latin Rhythm Albums number ones of 2007
