= El Que Sabe, Sabe =

2015 studio album by Tego Calderón

Studio album by Tego Calderón
- Released: February 3, 2015
- Recorded: 2008–2014
- Genres: Reggaeton, hip hop, Latin hip hop, alternative hip hop
- Length: 52 min
- Labels: Jiggiri; Siente; Universal Latino
- Producers: Nesty, El Santos, Echo

Tego Calderón chronology
| El Abayarde Contraataca (2007) | El Que Sabe, Sabe (2015) |

Singles from El Que Sabe, Sabe
- 1. "Dando Break" Released: October 23, 2014

El Que Sabe, Sabe is the fourth studio album by Puerto Rican rapper Tego Calderón, released 8 years after his last studio album, El Abayarde Contraataca, and 3 years after his mixtape The Original Gallo del País. The album won a Latin Grammy Award for Best Urban Music Album.

== Background ==
Originally set to be titled Mr. T, the album instead ended being titled El Que Sabe, Sabe in honor of Tego's father, Esteban Calderón Ibarraza, who died in 2004 and the production's title was a common phrase of him. It has lyrics influenced by Tego Calderón's life and also popular reggaeton. Calderón also decided to mix old school reggaeton with new music, for example: "Al Grano", which mixes reggaeton and dubstep. A duet was recorded with Latin Grammy winner Kany García. The song is about a young child suffering from many forms of abuse. Other songs like "Por Burro" and "Amar Por Amar" includes social themes. A song titled "Nadie Me Tumba" was recorded for this album, and a preview was released on the Internet, but Calderón decided to not include it on his album because he didn't want sad tracks. The rapper said that the song talks about his life and the problems he had after an accident.

Most of all I want to show my social side that perhaps I have neglected it a little. In this disk we come to take that social side and I am well slope to the letter, to what I say and to impact with what I say, real things that we see every day

— Tego Calderón

Calderón intended to release the album through Sony Music, but its executives did not like the fact that the album "was too intelligent and the public was stupid". He said that they rejected the album because the public doesn't have the intellectual level to understand it. Tego was upset and angry with this decision, and manifested his anger about Sony Music. He finally released his album through Siente Music, a subsidiary of Universal Music Latino.

== Release and promotion ==
The official release date for the album El Que Sabe, Sabe was February 3, 2015 and as of January 13, 2015 the album was made available for preorder via iTunes. It reached the top position on Billboard's Latin Rhythm chart on his first week. On February 13, 2015 was released the music video of "Dando Break", the album's only single. A music video for the song's remix was released on March 23, 2015.

== Track listing ==
| No. | Title | Writer(s) | Length |
|---|---|---|---|
| 1. | "Chinchorro" | Tegui Calderón, Victor M. Santos, E. Padilla | 0:26 |
| 2. | "No More Mr. Nice Guy" | T. Calderón, Victor M. Santos | 1:32 |
| 3. | "Mamey" | T. Calderón, Paul Irizarry | 3:02 |
| 4. | "Dando Break" | T. Calderón, E. Padilla | 2:39 |
| 5. | "Al Grano" | T. Calderón, E. Padilla | 4:05 |
| 6. | "Canción de Hamaca" | T. Calderón, E. Padilla | 3:32 |
| 7. | "Están Fritos" | T. Calderón, E. Padilla | 2:09 |
| 8. | "El Papá (La Receta de Mazucamba)" | T. Calderón, Victor M. Santos, E. Padilla | 2:56 |
| 9. | "Pastillita" (featuring Don Omar) | T. Calderón, William Landrón | 3:58 |
| 10. | "Así Mismo" | T. Calderón, E. Padilla | 2:55 |
| 11. | "Supongo" | T. Calderón, E. Padilla | 2:54 |
| 12. | "Amar Por Amar" | T. Calderón, E. Padilla | 3:35 |
| 13. | "Por Burro" | T. Calderón, Victor M. Santos, E. Padilla | 3:21 |
| 14. | "La Media" | T. Calderón, Victor M. Santos | 3:28 |
| 15. | "Quisiera Ser Cantante" | T. Calderón, Paul Irizarry | 3:16 |
| 16. | "Paz (Interlude)" | T. Calderón | 0:57 |
| 17. | "¿Y Quién Diría?" (featuring Kany García) | T. Calderón, Encarnita García, Paul Irizarry | 3:55 |
| 18. | "El Que Sabe, Sabe" | T. Calderón, Victor M. Santos | 3:47 |

=== Music videos ===
- "Dando Break" - February 11, 2015
- "Dando Break" (Remix) - March 23, 2015
- "El Que Sabe, Sabe" - September 30, 2015

== Personnel ==
- Primary Artist - Don Omar
- Composer - Ernesto Padilla
- Primary Artist - Kany García
- Composer, Primary Artist - Tego Calderón

== Charts ==
| Chart (2015) | Peak position |
|---|---|
| US Top Latin Albums (Billboard) | 2 |
| US Latin Rhythm Albums (Billboard) | 1 |
| US Top Rap Albums (Billboard) | 19 |
