= Jiggiri Records =

- Founded: 2001
- Founder: Tego Calderón
- Distributors: Machete Music, White Lion Records, Atlantic Records and Last Latin Records
- Genre: Reggaeton, hip hop
- Country of origin: Puerto Rico

Jiggiri Records is a record label that focuses on Latin music, including reggaeton, tropical music, jazz, reggae, Latin alternative and hip-hop, founded in Loíza, Puerto Rico by Tego Calderón and housed in Calderón's recording facility named El Sitio. Jiggiri was founded in 2001.

== Artists ==
- Tego Calderón
- Chyno Nyno
- El Choco
- Jungle
- Young Khalifa

== Albums ==
=== Studio albums ===
Tego Calderon

- El Abayarde (2003)
- El Enemy de los Guasíbiri (2004)
- The Underdog/El Subestimado (2006)
- El Abayarde Contraataca (2007)

Zion y Lennox

- Motivando a la Yal (2004)
- Motivando a la Yal: Special Edition (2005)

Julio Voltio

- Voltage AC (2004)

John Eric

- El Peso Completo (2005)

=== Compilation albums ===
Tego Calderón

- 2005: White Lion Hits Version, Vol. 1

=== Mixtapes ===
Tego Calderón

- 2008: Gongoli
- 2012: The Original Gallo Del País - O.G. El Mixtape

=== Future releases ===
Tego Calderón

- El Que Sabe, Sabe (2015)

== Producers ==
- Almonte
- Chile
- Pirulo
- La Prole

== See also ==
- Lists of record labels
