= Tego Calderón =

Puerto Rican rapper (born 1972)

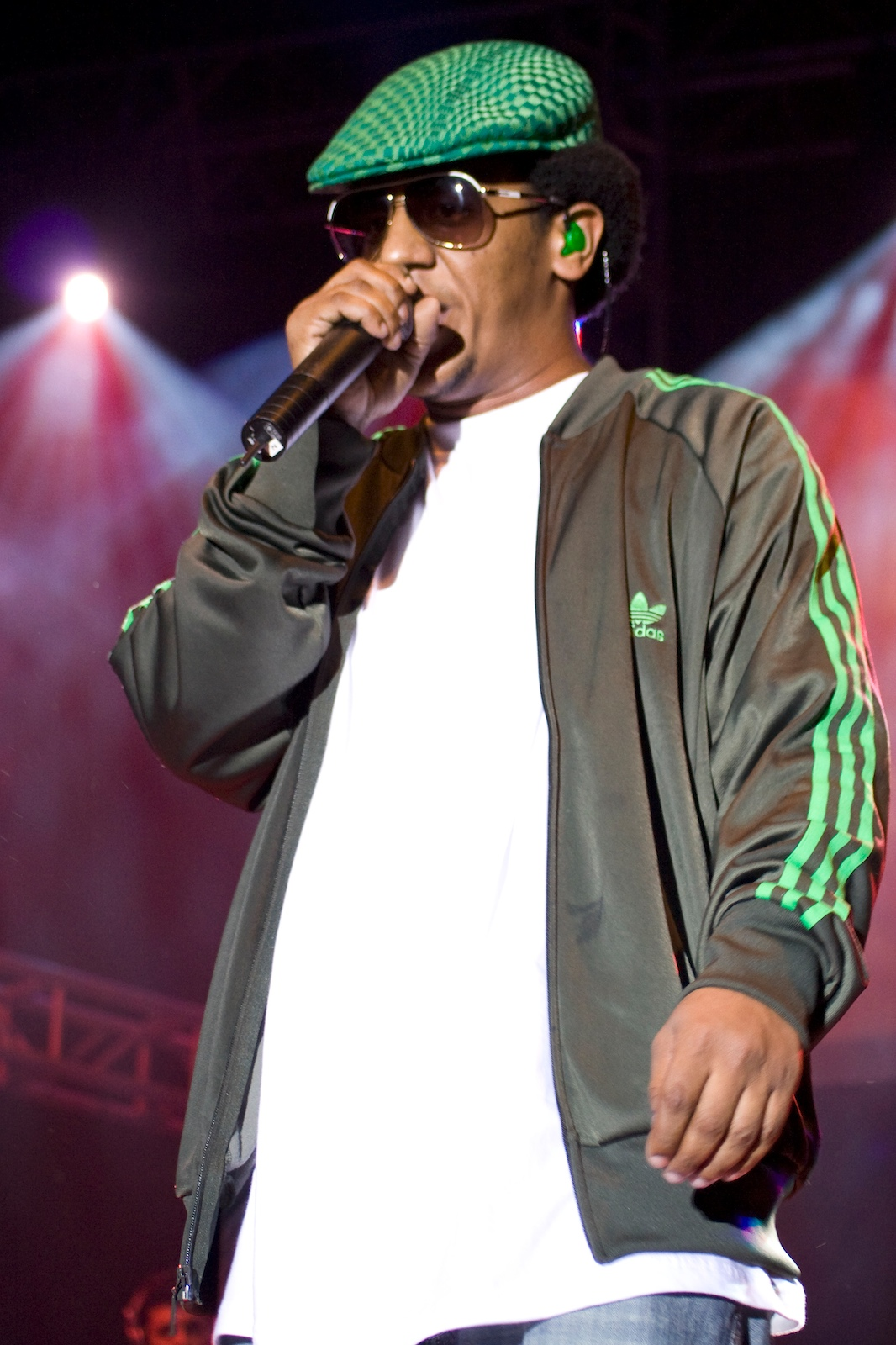
- Calderón performing in the Canary Islands, September 15, 2004

Background information
- Born: Tegui Calderón Rosario; February 1, 1972 (age 54); Santurce, San Juan, Puerto Rico
- Origin: Río Grande, Puerto Rico
- Genres: Latin hip hop; reggaeton; alternative reggaeton
- Occupations: Rapper; actor
- Instruments: Vocals; bongos; timbales; drums
- Years active: 1996–present
- Labels: White Lion; BMG U.S. Latin; Jiggiri; Atlantic; Warner Latina; Siente; Universal Latino; Paz y Esperanza

Tegui Calderón Rosario (born February 1, 1972) is a Puerto Rican rapper and actor. He began his musical career in 1996 (as Tego Tec) and was supported by the famous Puerto Rican rapper Eddie Dee, who invited him on his second studio album, El Terrorista de la Lírica, released in 2000. Calderón reached international success in 2003 with his first album, El Abayarde, which sold 300,000 copies worldwide and was nominated for a Latin Grammy Award. His importance in reggaeton music led him to participate in Eddie Dee's 12 Discípulos album in 2004. He released three more studio albums between 2006 and 2015, varying in styles, focusing more in hip hop and African music rather than reggaeton in The Underdog/El Subestimado (2006) and El Abayarde Contraataca (2007). His fourth studio album, El Que Sabe, Sabe, released in 2015, won a Latin Grammy Award for Best Urban Music Album.

Calderón's style is characterized by his social and political themes, with lyrics against corruption in the Puerto Rican government. His themes also include dancing, love, self-reflection and personal experiences.

His film career started in 2007 with his supporting role in Illegal Tender. In 2009 he had a lead role in a short film called Los Bandoleros, which is part of Fast & Furious franchise, and the same year had a cameo appearance in the fourth installment of that franchise, Fast & Furious. In 2011, he reprised his character in a supporting role in Fast Five, alongside his colleague and friend Don Omar.

== Early life ==
Calderón was born in Santurce, Puerto Rico. He is the son of Pilar Rosario Parrilla, a schoolteacher, and Esteban Calderón Ilarraza, a government worker for Puerto Rico's Department of Health. Moving at a young age from his native Puerto Rico to Miami, Florida, Calderón attended Miami Beach Senior High. Here he was exposed to several different cultures, eventually studying percussion and working as a drummer in a rock band. The band would cover songs produced by artists including Ozzy Osbourne and Led Zeppelin. He has noted that both of his parents were fans of Ismael Rivera, and that his father was also interested in jazz. He was influenced by both genres and incorporated them into his music, including songs such as "Minnie the Moocher". He eventually developed a music style that combined elements of salsa, plena, dancehall, and hip-hop, focusing on aspects of urban life in his lyrics.

== Early musical career ==
Calderón's career began as a participant in Puerto Rican hip hop contests on television during the 1990s. He met Eddie Dee and DJ Adam who would become his main collaborators, but Calderón was rejected by most producers and deejays at the time. DJ Adam in an interview with Puerto Rican podcaster Chente Ydrach said that Calderón was going to be a part of the underground album DJ Adam's Mad Jam, but Calderón's style was too eccentric and underdeveloped, so he was taken out of the final tracklist.

Calderón signed to Eddie Dee's label in 2000, collaborating with Dee on his first hit on Puerto Rican radio, the hip hop song "En Peligro de Extinción" from Dee's second album El Terrorista de la Lírica.

During 2001-2002, Calderón participated in over a dozen original compilations including gold and platinum albums such as "Kilates", "Boricuas NY" volumes 1 and 2, "The Majestic", "La Mision" volumes 2 and 3 and of course his first worldwide crossover hit 'Cosa Buena' from the "Planet Reggae" production distributed by White Lion Records and Diamond Music. On top of that, he also was featured in the albums of Yaga y Mackie "Sonando Diferente" and Maestro's "The Movie" which further accelerated his buzz in the streets.

Thanks to 'Cosa Buena' and it being one of the first reggaeton videos receiving major rotation on mainstream channels such as Telemundo, in 2002, Calderón became a worldwide phenomenon before his debut album "El Abayarde" in November of that same year creating much hype for his debut. Despite only being available in Puerto Rico, the Dominican Republic and parts of the United States due to White Lion Records (formerly known as Boricua Guerrero and now 100% under Elías de León's ownership) being an independent label at the time; Regardless, 'El Abayarde' became the first hip hop/reggaeton album by a solo artist to sell over 75,000 units in one week with no major label distribution. This success led to Calderón and White Lion signing a joint venture with Sony Music Latin. Calderón formed his own label in the process known as Jiggiri Records under the White Lion banner and distributed by Sony Music Latin. Jiggiri Records would go on to sign and release multi-platinum albums from notable artists such as Zion & Lennox, Julio Voltio and John Eric. Calderón would go on to become one of the most successful touring acts in all of Latin music from 2003-2005, thus further legitimizing the genre now known as reggaeton (once called 'underground').

In August 2003, Calderón performed at the Madison Square Garden in New York City. Based on his show and performance, The New York Times noted that he "made the best case for Reggaetón as music with room to grow" being a "forward-looking performer." His second appearance at the venue was in October 2004, where he headlined an event titled Megatón 2004. The concert sold out, with 20,000 in attendance, a mixed crowd of Latino and non-Latino fans.

Calderón's travels subsequently led him to Miami, where he incorporated dancehall elements into his musical style. In 2004, his album titled El Enemy de los Guasíbiri was released. The album's production included a mix of several urban genres. Calderón claimed that he preferred the influence of these other genres due to his belief that Salsa had "become too corporate and too safe". Years after its release, Calderón stated that he had never approved the release of the Guasibiri album, which he claimed was rather a collection of old songs and that it should be left out of his discography as an unauthorized album. Following the release of this album, reggaeton gained more influence with several hip-hop producers in New York. Calderón continued working on several mixtapes, being featured in remixes of Usher's "Yeah", Fat Joe's "Lean Back", N.O.R.E.'s "Oye Mi Canto" and Akon's "I Wanna Love You", 50 Cent's P.I.M.P remix and also Calderón featured Aventura's "We Got the Crown".

== 2005–present ==
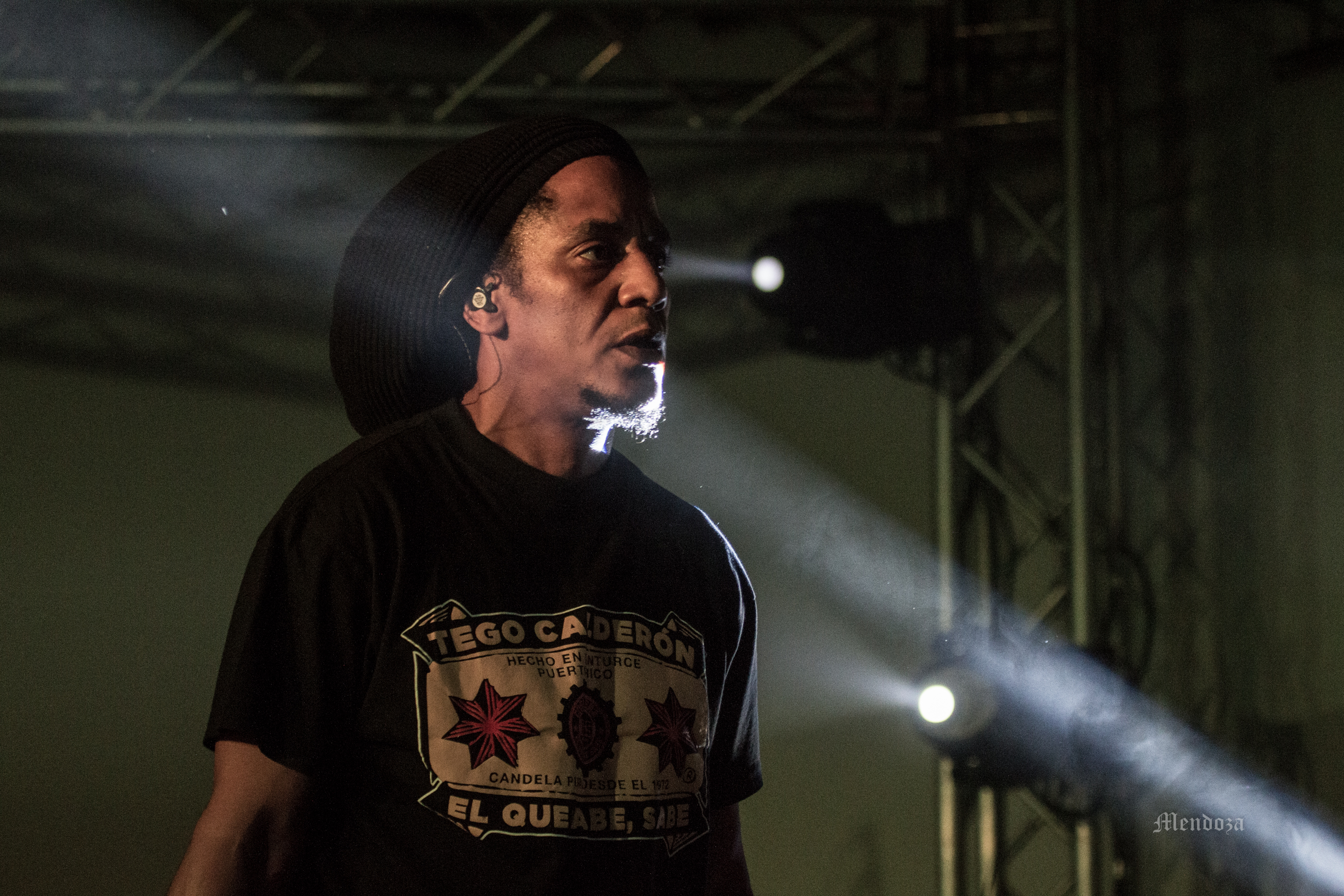
Calderón at the Laredo Coliseum 2015

Calderón participated on the 2004 and 2005 editions of New York's Puerto Rican Day parade. During this timeframe he became the first Latin American artist to be included on New York's Power-105. Calderón's influence among Latin American youth was noted in a featured published by the Village Voice. The publication claimed that he had "almost single-handedly. .. steered his country's dominant youth culture out of the island and Latino neighborhoods, and into the American stream of pop consciousness.” Around this time Calderón still remained a fixture in popular Latin music thanks to international hit such as the Don Omar– led "Bandoleros" (notably included in The Fast and the Furious: Tokyo Drift soundtrack) and "Quítate Tú Pa Ponerme Yo" from Dee's 12 Discípulos compilation album.

In mid-2005, Calderón signed a joint venture deal between Atlantic Records and his own independent label, Jiggiri Records, for the amount of a million dollars as reported in the Hip Hop/Reggaeton publications of the time. In 2006, he released The Underdog/El Subestimado, his second album, containing less reggaeton and more hip hop music. This album featured appearances by Buju Banton, Voltio, Bataklán, Eddie Dee, Luis Cabán, Yandel, Zion, Chyno Nyno, Don Omar and Oscar D'León. Several producers were involved in the album, including Cookee, Major League, Salaam Remi, Eric Figueroa, Luny Tunes, DJ Nelson, Danny Fornaris, Nesty la Mente Maestra, Naldo, DJ Joe, DJ Fat, Echo and Diesel.

In 2023, Calderón released "La Receta" through Paz y Esperanza and Universal Music Latino.

== Musical styles and themes ==
Although Calderón is a reggaeton artist, he claims to like "all types of music". Evidence of this is seen both in his biography (he began his career in music in a heavy metal band and attended a school for music as a drummer) as well as in his music, which incorporates "'several musical tendencies'", including sounds and rhythms from places like Africa, Colombia, and the Caribbean. He obtains the sound for his popular reggaeton music through "fusing an experimental reggaeton style strongly rooted in the working-class Caribbean aesthetics of classic salsa with a strong dose of hip-hop". On The Underdog/El Subestimado, he collaborated with rap duo Anónimo Consejo to create a song entitled "Son Dos Alas" which eventually was shortened to an interlude without Calderón.

Calderón has also been praised for his lyrics, which are much more substantive and uplifting, expressing social consciousness. Calderón has been described as "the reggaeton champion of an Afro-Caribbean working-class aesthetic" and is known for lyrics that are equal parts poetry and politics. A consistent link between all of his albums "are the social themes and the untouchable bravado that he usually transmits through his artistic outlook." According to Tony Touch (legendary hip hop dj and collaborator), "Tego is someone who represents struggle, an underdog... He's more of an MC, a product of late-'80s hip-hop."

The most prevalent themes among his music, videos, and interviews are the commemoration of blackness and exposition of racism against Latino and Latin American individuals. His essay, "Black Pride", was first published in the New York Post and discusses the discrimination faced by Black Latinos in Latin America, especially through his own experiences growing up in Puerto Rico. The essay recalls the history of African enslavement and the United States' Civil Rights Movement to urge Black Latinos to defend their rights and challenge the racism and colorism ingrained in society:

This is not about rejecting whiteness rather; it’s about learning to love our blackness – to love ourselves. We have to say basta ya, it’s enough, and find a way to love our blackness. They have confused us – and taught us to hate each other – to self-hate and create divisions on shades and features.

== Film and other career projects ==
Calderón made his acting debut in the film Illegal Tender produced by John Singleton. Calderón played the role of Choco, a Puerto Rican gangster whose character was written specifically for him by director Franc. Reyes.

Calderón turned down roles in both Feel the Noise and "El Cantante" and instead chose to appear in Illegal Tender out of respect for its producer. After convincing John Singleton that he wanted to appear in a comedy, Calderón was slated to appear in an upcoming Singleton film which casts him as the coach of a baseball team., but the movie was never produced.

Calderón traveled to Sierra Leone along with artists Raekwon and Paul Wall to film a VH1 documentary about diamond mining entitled "Bling'd: Blood, Diamonds, and Hip-Hop." The documentary focused on the role of Hip Hop in the blood diamond trade, after the filming concluded Calderón publicly announced that he would no longer wear jewelry. His experience in Africa also changed his outlook on life, which influenced the recording of the track "Alegria", encouraging fans to not complain about life and recognize that there are other people with bigger problems in their lives.

Calderón and Don Omar are featured in Fast & Furious, Fast Five and The Fate of the Furious, the fourth, fifth and eighth installments of The Fast and the Furious franchise.

== Discography ==
Studio albums

- El Abayarde (2002)
- The Underdog/El Subestimado (2006)
- El Abayarde Contraataca (2007)
- El Que Sabe, Sabe (2015)

Mixtapes

- The Original Gallo Del País - O.G. El Mixtape (2012)

Compilation albums

- El Enemy de los Guasíbiri (2004)

== Awards and nominations ==
American Society of Composers, Authors and Publishers Latin Music Awards

Year	Nominee / work	Award	Result	Ref.
2004	«Al Natural»	Hip hop/Rap/Reggaeton Song of the Year	Won	
2009	«Quitarte To'» (featuring Randy)	Urban Song of the Year	Won	

Grammy Awards

Year	Nominee / work	Award	Result	Ref.
2007	The Underdog/El Subestimado	Best Latin Rock, Alternative or Urban Album	Nominated	
2008	El Abayarde Contraataca	Best Latin Urban Album	Nominated	

Latin Grammy Awards

Year	Nominee / work	Award	Result	Ref.
2003	El Abayarde	Best Urban Music Album	Nominated	
2008	El Abayarde Contraataca	Best Urban Music Album	Nominated	
2008	«Ni Fu Ni Fa»	Best Urban Song	Nominated	
2012	"Calentura" (with ChocQuibTown and Zully Murillo)	Record of the Year	Nominated	
2012	The Original Gallo del País	Best Urban Music Album	Nominated	
2015	El Que Sabe, Sabe	Best Urban Music Album	Won	
2015	«Dando Break»	Best Urban Song	Nominated	
2023	«La Receta»	Best Reggaeton Performance	Won	

== Filmography ==
Year	Title	Role	Notes
2007	Illegal Tender	Choco	Film Debut
2007	Bling: A Planet Rock	Himself	Documentary film / DVD
2009	Fast & Furious	Tego Leo	Cameo
2009	Los Bandoleros	Tego Leo	Short film
2011	Fast Five	Tego Leo	Supporting Role
2017	The Fate of the Furious	Tego Leo	Cameo

=== Video games ===
Year	Title	Role
2007	Def Jam Icon	Himself (voice)
2013	Fast & Furious: Showdown	Tego Leo (voice)

== See also ==
- List of Afro-Latinos
