= Primetime Emmy Award for Outstanding Variety Special (Live) =

Annual TV award

- Awarded for: Outstanding Variety Special (Live)
- Country: United States
- Presented by: Academy of Television Arts & Sciences
- Currently held by: The Apple Music Super Bowl LX Halftime Show Starring Bad Bunny (2026)
- Website: http://www.emmys.com/

The Primetime Emmy Award for Outstanding Variety Special (Live) is awarded to one live television special each year. The award was presented as Outstanding Special Class Program until it was restructured for the 70th Primetime Emmy Awards.

In the following list, the first titles listed in gold are the winners; those not in gold are nominees, which are listed in alphabetical order. The years given are those in which the ceremonies took place.

== Winners and nominations ==
=== 1970s ===
Year	Program	Nominees	Network
1977 (29th)	Outstanding Classical Program in the Performing Arts		
1977 (29th)	American Ballet Theatre: Swan Lake (Live from Lincoln Center)	John Goberman, producer	PBS
1977 (29th)	American Ballet Theatre (Dance in America: Great Performances)	Jac Venza, executive producer; Emile Ardolino, series coordinating producer; Merrill Brockway, series producer	PBS
1977 (29th)	Arthur Rubenstein at 90 (Great Performances)	Jac Venza, Klaus Hallig and Herbert G. Kloiber, executive producers; David Griffiths and Fritz Buttenstadt, producers; Arthur Rubenstein, performer	PBS
1977 (29th)	Martha Graham Dance Company (Dance in America: Great Performances)	Jac Venza, executive producer; Emile Ardolino, series coordinating producer; Merrill Brockway, series producer; Martha Graham, performer	PBS
1977 (29th)	The Bolshoi Ballet: Romeo and Juliet	Lothar Bock, executive producer; Alvin Cooperman, producer	CBS
1977 (29th)	Outstanding Achievement in Coverage of Special Events — Programs (Note: As a juried award, nominees had to garner 50% approval to win the award. The nominee did not meet the benchmark and no award was given.)		
1977 (29th)	The 19th Annual Grammy Awards	Marty Pasetta, producer	CBS
1977 (29th)	The 28th Annual Primetime Emmy Awards	Norman Rosemont, producer	ABC
1977 (29th)	The 30th Annual Tony Awards	Alexander H. Cohen, producer	ABC
1977 (29th)	The 48th Annual Oscar Awards	Howard W. Koch, producer	ABC
1977 (29th)	The Good Old Days of Radio	Loring d'Usseau, producer	PBS
Outstanding Classical Program in the Performing Arts
1978 (30th)
1978 (30th)	American Ballet Theatre's "Giselle" (Live from Lincoln Center)	John Goberman, producer	PBS
1978 (30th)	American Ballet Theatre at the Metropolitan Opera House (Live from Lincoln Center)	John Goberman, executive producer; Emile Ardolino, producer	PBS
1978 (30th)	La Bohème (Live from the Met)	Michael Bronson, executive producer; John Goberman, producer	PBS
1978 (30th)	Dance in America: Choreography by Balanchine (Great Performances)	Jac Venza, executive producer; Merrill Brockway and Emile Ardolino, producers	PBS
1978 (30th)	The Nutcracker (Baryshnikov)	Herman E. Krawitz, executive producer; Yanna Kroyt Brandt, producer	CBS
1979 (31st)
1979 (31st)	Balanchine IV (Dance in America: Great Performances)	Jac Venza, executive producer; Merrill Brockway, series producer; Emile Ardolino, series coordinating producer; Judy Kinberg, producer	PBS
1979 (31st)	The American Ballet Theatre: The Sleeping Beauty (Live from Lincoln Center)	John Goberman, producer	PBS
1979 (31st)	Balanchine III (Dance in America: Great Performances)	Jac Venza, executive producer; Merrill Brockway, series producer; Emile Ardolino, series coordinating producer; Judy Kinberg, producer	PBS
1979 (31st)	Giulini's Beethoven's 9th Live: A Gift from Los Angeles	Jeanne Mulcahy, executive producer; John Goberman, producer	PBS
1979 (31st)	Live from Lincoln Center	John Goberman, producer	PBS

=== 1980s ===
Year	Program	Nominees	Network
1980 (32nd)
1980 (32nd)	Live from Studio 8H: A Tribute to Toscanini	Alvin Cooperman and Judith de Paul, producers	NBC
1980 (32nd)	Agnes deMille and the Joffrey Ballet in Conversations About the Dance	Loring d'Usseau, producer; Agnes de Mille, star	PBS
1980 (32nd)	Beverly Sills in Concert	Thomas L. Merklinger, executive producer; Beverly Sills, star	PBS
1980 (32nd)	New York Philharmonic with Zubin Mehta and Luciano Pavarotti (Live from Lincoln Center)	John Goberman, producer; Luciano Pavarotti, performer	PBS
1981 (33rd)
1981 (33rd)	Live from Studio 8H: An Evening of Jerome Robbins	Alvin Cooperman and Judith de Paul, producers	NBC
1981 (33rd)	Beverly! Her Farewell Performance (Live from Lincoln Center)	John Goberman, producer; Beverly Sills, performer	PBS
1981 (33rd)	Isaac Stern's 60th Birthday Celebration (Live from Lincoln Center)	John Goberman, producer; Zubin Mehta, Itzhak Perlman, Pinchas Zukerman and Isaac Stern, performers	PBS
1981 (33rd)	Joan Sutherland, Marilyn Horne and Luciano Pavarotti in Recital (Live from Lincoln Center)	John Goberman, producer; Joan Sutherland, Marilyn Horne and Luciano Pavarotti, performers	PBS
1981 (33rd)	Nureyev and the Joffrey Ballet in Tribute to Nijinsky (Great Performances)	Jac Venza, executive producer; Emile Ardolino and Judy Kinberg, producers; Rudolf Nureyev, performer	PBS
1982 (34th)
1982 (34th)	La Bohème (Live from the Met)	Michael Bronson, executive producer; Clemente D'Alessio, producer	PBS
1982 (34th)	Bernstein/Beethoven	Horant H. Hohlfeld and Harry J. Kraut, executive producers; David Griffiths, producer; Leonard Bernstein, performer	PBS
1982 (34th)	An Evening with Danny Kaye and the New York Philharmonic (Live from Lincoln Center)	Herbert Bonis, executive producer; John Goberman, producer; Danny Kaye, performer	PBS
1982 (34th)	An Evening with Itzhak Perlman and the New York Philharmonic (Live from Lincoln Center)	John Goberman, producer; Itzhak Perlman, performer	PBS
1982 (34th)	Horowitz in London: A Royal Concert	Peter Gelb and John Vernon, producers; Vladimir Horowitz, performer	PBS
1983 (35th)
1983 (35th)	Paravotti in Philadelphia: La Bohème	Margaret Anne Everitt, executive producer; Clemente D'Alessio, producer; Luciano Pavarotti, performer	PBS
1983 (35th)	Dance in America	Jac Venza, executive producer; Judy Kinberg and Barbara Horgan, producers	PBS
1983 (35th)	In Concert at the Met: Price, Horne, Levine	Michael Bronson, executive producer; Clemente D'Alessio, producer; Leontyne Price, Marilyn Horne and James Levine, stars	PBS
1983 (35th)	Stravinsky and Balanchine: A Genius Has a Birthday! (Live from Lincoln Center)	John Goberman and Barbara Horgan, producers	PBS
1983 (35th)	Wagner's Ring: The Bayreuth Centennial Production	Horant H. Hohlfeld, executive producer; David Griffiths, Dietrich von Watzforf and Peter Windgassen, producers	PBS
1984 (36th)
1984 (36th)	Plácido Domingo Celebrates Seville (Great Performances)	Horant H. Hohlfeld, executive producer; David Griffiths and Thomas Buerger, producers; Plácido Domingo, host	PBS
1984 (36th)	Bernstein: Conductor, Soloist and Teacher (Great Performances)	Horant H. Hohlfeld and Harry J. Kraut, executive producer; Thomas Buerger, producer; Leonard Bernstein, host	PBS
1984 (36th)	The Compleat Gilbert & Sullivan	George Walker, executive producer; Judith de Paul, producer	PBS
1984 (36th)	James Galway and Zubin Mehta with the New York Philharmonic (Live from Lincoln Center)	John Goberman, producer; James Galway and Zubin Mehta, hosts	PBS
1984 (36th)	New York City Ballet: A Tribute to George Balanchine (Live from Lincoln Center)	John Goberman and Barbara Horgan, producers	PBS
1985 (37th)
1985 (37th)	Tosca (Live from the Met)	Michael Bronson, executive producer; Samuel Paul, producer	PBS
1985 (37th)	Aida (Live from the Met)	Michael Bronson, executive producer; Samuel Paul, producer	PBS
1985 (37th)	Bernstein Conducts "West Side Story" (Great Performances)	Ian Squires and Harry J. Kraut, executive producers; Humphrey Burton and Thomas Skinner, producers; Leonard Bernstein, host	PBS
1985 (37th)	Dance in America: Baryshnikov by Tharp with American Ballet Theatre (Great Performances)	Rhoda Grauer, executive producer; Don Mischer, producer; Mikhail Baryshnikov, host	PBS
1985 (37th)	The Well-Tempered Bach with Peter Ustinov	Byron Knight, Thomas Doggett and Christian P. Stehr, co-executive producers; Hans Vetter, producer; Peter Ustinov, host	PBS
1986 (38th)
1986 (38th)	Wolf Trap Presents The Kirov: Swan Lake	Michael B. Styer, executive producer; Phillip Byrd, senior producer; John Potthast, producer	PBS
1986 (38th)	Aaron Copland's 85th Birthday with the New York Philharmonic and Zubin Mehta (Live from Lincoln Center)	John Goberman, producer; Richard Baker, coordinating producer; Zubin Mehta, performer	PBS
1986 (38th)	Dance in America: Choreography by Jerome Robbins with the New York City Ballet (Great Performances)	Jac Venza and Rhoda Grauer, executive producers; Judy Kinberg, producer	PBS
1986 (38th)	Dance in America: Dance Theatre of Harlem in "A Streetcar Named Desire" (Great Performances)	Jac Venza, executive producers; Judy Kinberg and Thomas Grimm, producers	PBS
1986 (38th)	New York Philharmonic Celebration with Isaac Stern, Itzhak Perlman & Montserrat Cavalle (Live from Lincoln Center)	John Goberman, producer; Marc Bauman, coordinating producer; Isaac Stern, Itzhak Perlman and Montserrat Caballé, performers	PBS
1987 (39th)
1987 (39th)	Vladimir Horowitz: The Last Romantic	Peter Gelb, executive producer; Susan Froemke, producer; Vladimir Horowitz, performer	PBS
1987 (39th)	Carnegie Hall: The Grand Reopening	Don Mischer, executive producer; Jan Cornell and David J. Goldberg, producers	PBS
1987 (39th)	Dance in America: In Memory of... A Ballet by Jerome Robbins (Great Performances)	Jac Venza, executive producer; Judy Kinberg and Rhoda Grauer, producers	PBS
1987 (39th)	An Evening with Joan Sutherland and Luciano Pavarotti (The Metropolitan Opera Presents)	Samuel Paul, producer; Joan Sutherland and Luciano Pavarotti, performers	PBS
1987 (39th)	Liberty Weekend: International Concert	David L. Wolper, executive producer; David Griffiths, producer	ABC
1988 (40th)
1988 (40th)	Nixon in China (Great Performances)	Jac Venza, executive producer; David Horn, series producer; Michael Bronson, producer; John Walker, coordinating producer	PBS
1988 (40th)	All That Bach	Niv Fichman and Louise Clark, producers	PBS
1988 (40th)	American Ballet Theatre's "Romeo and Juliet" Live (Live from Lincoln Center)	John Goberman, producer; Marc Bauman, coordinating producer	PBS
1988 (40th)	Dance in America: Balanchine and Cunningham — An Evening at American Ballet Theatre (Great Performances)	Jac Venza, executive producer; Judy Kinberg and Thomas Grimm, producers	PBS
1988 (40th)	New York Philharmonic New Year's Eve Celebration with Zubin Mehta & Kathleen Battle (Live from Lincoln Center)	John Goberman, producer; Marc Bauman, coordinating producer; Zubin Mehta and Kathleen Battle, performers	PBS
1989 (41st)
1989 (41st)	Bernstein at 70! (Great Performances)	Harry J. Kraut and Klaus Hallig, executive producers; Michael Bronson and Thomas Skinner, producers	PBS
1989 (41st)	Dance in America: Baryshnikov Dances Balanchine (Great Performances)	Jac Venza, executive producer; Judy Kinberg and Thomas Grimm, producers	PBS
1989 (41st)	Dance in America: A Night at the Joffrey (Great Performances)	Jac Venza, executive producer; Judy Kinberg and Thomas Grimm, producers	PBS
1989 (41st)	Horowitz Plays Mozart	Peter Gelb, executive producer; Susan Froemke, producer	PBS
1989 (41st)	Ray Charles in Concert with the New York City Ballet (Live from Lincoln Center)	John Goberman, producer; Marc Bauman, coordinating producer	PBS

=== 1990s ===
Year	Program	Nominees	Network
1990 (42nd)
1990 (42nd)	Aida (The Metropolitan Opera Presents)	Peter Gelb, executive producer	PBS
1990 (42nd)	Carmen on Ice	Thomas Buerger, executive producer	HBO
1990 (42nd)	A Classical Jazz Christmas with Wynton Marsalis (Live from Lincoln Center)	John Goberman, producer; Marc Bauman, coordinating producer; Wynton Marsalis, performer	PBS
1990 (42nd)	Mostly Mozart (Live from Lincoln Center)	John Goberman, producer; Marc Bauman, coordinating producer; Itzhak Perlman, performer	PBS
1990 (42nd)	Show Boat (Great Performances)	David Horn and Jac Venza, executive producers; John Walker, producer	PBS
1991 (43rd)
1991 (43rd)	Tchaikovsky: 150th Birthday Gala from Leningrad	Peter Gelb, executive producer; Helmut Rost, producer; Anne Cauvin and Laura Mitgang, coordinating producers	PBS
1991 (43rd)	Carnegie Hall: Live at 100	Don Mischer and Judith Arron, executive producers; David J. Goldberg and Ray F. Wellbaum, producers; Joann Goldberg, co-producer; Geoff Bennett, coordinating producer	PBS
1991 (43rd)	Into the Woods (American Playhouse)	Michael Brandman, executive producer; Iris Merlis, producer	PBS
1991 (43rd)	A Little Night Music (Live from Lincoln Center)	John Goberman, producer; Marc Bauman, coordinating producer	PBS
1991 (43rd)	Pavarotti Plus! (Live from Lincoln Center)	John Goberman, producer; Marc Bauman, coordinating producer; Luciano Pavarotti, performer	PBS
1992 (44th)
1992 (44th)	Perlman in Russia	Roger Press, executive producer; Robert Dalrymple, producer; Itzhak Perlman, performer	PBS
1992 (44th)	The 100th Telecast: Pavarotti Plus! (Live from Lincoln Center)	John Goberman, producer; Karen McLaughlin and Marc Bauman, coordinating producers; Luciano Pavarotti, performer	
1992 (44th)	A Carnegie Hall Christmas Concert (Great Performances)	Peter Gelb, executive producer; Daniel Anker and Laura Mitgang, producers; André Previn, conductor	PBS
1992 (44th)	Kathleen Battle and Wynton Marsalis in Baroque Duet (Great Performances)	Susan Froemke and Peter Gelb, producers; Kathleen Battle and Wynton Marsalis, performers	PBS
1992 (44th)	Paul McCartney's Liverpool Ontario (Live from Lincoln Center)	Richard Ogden, executive producer; Chips Chipperfield, producer	PBS
1993 (45th)			PBS
1993 (45th)	Tosca: In the Settings and at the Times of Tosca	Rada Rassimov, executive producer; Andrea Andermann, producer; Zubin Mehta, conductor	PBS
1993 (45th)	Dance in America: The Hard Nut (Great Performances)	Jac Venza, executive producer; Judy Kinberg, producer	PBS
1993 (45th)	Disney's Young Musicians Symphony Orchestra	Dwight Hemion and Gary Smith, executive producers; Gail Purse, producer; Patrick Davidson, co-producer	Disney
1993 (45th)	Kathleen Battle at the Metropolitan Museum	Peter Gelb, executive producer; Pat Jaffe, producer; Kathleen Battle, performer	A&E
1993 (45th)	The King and I: Recording a Hollywood Dream	Pat Faust and Pierre Collet, executive producers; Robert Dalrymple, producer	NPT
Outstanding Cultural Program
1994 (46th)
1994 (46th)	Vladimir Horowitz: A Reminiscence	Peter Gelb, executive producer; Pat Jaffe, producer	PBS
1994 (46th)	Balanchine Celebration (Great Performances)	Jac Venza, executive producer; Judy Kinberg, producer	PBS
1994 (46th)	Carnegie Hall Salutes the Jazz Masters: Verve Records at 50 (Great Performances)	John Scher and Jac Venza, executive producers; David Horn and Jeff Rowland, producers	PBS
1994 (46th)	Pavarotti in Paris	Tibor Rudas, producer; Luciano Pavarotti, performer	A&E
1994 (46th)	Porgy and Bess (American Playhouse / Great Performances)	Jac Venza, Lindsay Law, Dennis Marks and Richard Price, executive producers; Greg Smith and Stephany Marks, producers	PBS
1995 (47th)
1995 (47th)	Verdi's La Traviata with the New York City Opera (Live from Lincoln Center)	John Goberman, producer; Marc Bauman, coordinating producer	PBS
1995 (47th)	Disney's Young Musicians Symphony Orchestra	Gary Smith and Dwight Hemion, executive producer; Gail Purse, producer; Patrick Davidson, co-producer	Disney
1995 (47th)	Eric Clapton: Nothing But the Blues — An In the Spotlight Special	David Horn, Martin Scorsese and John Beug, executive producers; Stephen 'Scooter' Weintraub and Ken Ehrlich, producers	PBS
1995 (47th)	Tibor Rudas Presents The Three Tenors in Concert 1994	Tibor Rudas, producer	PBS
1995 (47th)	A Tribute to Black Music Legends	Cindy Mahmoud, executive producer; Curtis Gadson, producer; Candace Jones-Sutton and Joyce Cannady, segment producer	Syndicated
Outstanding Cultural Music-Dance Program
1996 (48th)
1996 (48th)	Itzhak Perlman: In the Fiddler's House (Great Performances)	Jac Venza, executive producer; Glenn DuBose, executive producer/co-director; James Arntz, producer/writer; Bill Murphy, coordinating producer; Sara Lukinson, producer/writer; Don Lenzer, co-director; Itzhak Perlman, performer	PBS
1996 (48th)	Brian Wilson: I Just Wasn't Made for These Times	Anne-Marie Mackay and Jonathon Ker, executive producers; Don Was, producer/director; Larry Schapiro, David Passick and Ken Kushnick, producers; Brian Wilson, performer	Disney
1996 (48th)	Gregorian Chant: Songs of the Spirit	Bruce T. Marcus, Ellen G. Marcus and Barry Stoner, executive producers	PBS
1996 (48th)	Peter, Paul and Mary: Lifelines (Great Performances)	David Horn, Jac Venza and Ken Fritz, executive producers; Richard Schilling, coordinating producer; Laurie Donnelly, producer; Mitch Owgang, on-line producer; Peter, Paul and Mary, performers	PBS
1996 (48th)	Rodgers & Hammerstein: The Sound of Movies	Kevin Burns, executive producer/director; Michael E. Katz, executive producer; Kim Egan, supervising producer; Steve Bell, Louise Gallop-Roholt and Debra Sanderson, writers	A&E
1997 (49th)
1997 (49th)	Puccini's La Bohème with the New York City Opera (Live from Lincoln Center)	John Goberman, producer; Marc Bauman, coordinating producer	PBS
1997 (49th)	Bobby McFerrin: Loosely Mozart, the New Innovators of Classical Music (Great Performances)	Peter Gelb, executive producer; Pat Jaffe, executive producer/director; Molly McBride and Laura Mitgang, producers; Bobby McFerrin, host/performer	PBS
1997 (49th)	A Celebration of the American Musical (Live from Lincoln Center)	John Goberman, producer; Marc Bauman, coordinating producer	PBS
1997 (49th)	John F. Kennedy Center 25th Anniversary Celebration	Fred A. Rappoport, producer/writer; Gary Smith, executive producer/producer/writer; Lawrence J. Wilker, executive producer; Robert Shrum, writer; Dwight Hemion, director	PBS
1997 (49th)	Mostly Mozart 30th Anniversary Opening Night Concert With Itzhak Perlman and Pinchas Zukerman (Live from Lincoln Center)	John Goberman, producer; Marc Bauman, coordinating producer	PBS
Outstanding Classical Music-Dance Program
1998 (50th)
1998 (50th)	Yo-Yo Ma Inspired by Bach: Six Gestures	Niv Fichman, producer; Patricia Rozema, director/writer	PBS
1998 (50th)	Blue Suede Shoes — Ballet Rocks!	Mark A. Rosenberger and David Oakland, producers; Tony Charmoli, director	PBS
1998 (50th)	The Metropolitan Opera Presents Carmen	Louisa Briccetti and Susan Erben, producer; James Levine, conductor; Gary Halvorson, director	PBS
1998 (50th)	Paul McCartney's Standing Stone	Paul McCartney, executive producer; Kris Slava, supervising A&E producer; Frances Peters, producer; Christopher Swann, director; Lawrence Foster, conductor	A&E
1998 (50th)	Variety and Virtuosity: American Ballet Theatre Now (Great Performances)	Jac Venza, executive producer; Judy Kinberg, producer/documentary directed by; Thomas Grimm, ballets directed by	PBS
1999 (51st)
1999 (51st)	Itzhak Perlman: Fiddling for the Future	Jac Venza, executive producer; Walter Scheuer, executive producer for Four Oaks Foundation; Margaret Smilow, producer; Allan Miller, director; Itzhak Perlman, performer	PBS
1999 (51st)	Dance in America: A Hymn for Alvin Ailey (Great Performances)	Orlando Bagwell, producer/director/writer; Jac Venza, executive producer	PBS
1999 (51st)	Ellington at 100 – New York Philharmonic and Jazz at Lincoln Center (Live from Lincoln Center)	John Goberman, producer; Marc Bauman, coordinating producer	PBS
1999 (51st)	New York City Ballet: Tchaikovsky's Swan Lake (Live from Lincoln Center)	John Goberman, producer; Marc Bauman, coordinating producer	PBS
1999 (51st)	A Streetcar Named Desire: From the San Francisco Opera (Great Performances)	David Horn, Jac Venza, Lotfi Mansouri, Nigel Boon, Jane Seymour and Barbara Bellini Witkowski, executive producers; John Walker, Judy Flannery and Kate Gaitley, producers; Kirk Browning, director; André Previn, conductor	PBS

=== 2000s ===
Year	Program	Nominees	Network
2000 (52nd)
2000 (52nd)	Dance in America: American Ballet Theatre in Le Corsaire (Great Performances)	Jac Venza, executive producer; Judy Kinberg, producer; Matthew Diamond, director	PBS
2000 (52nd)	Andrea Bocelli: Sacred Arias (Great Performances)	David Horn, Jac Venza, Costa Pilavachi and Clive Bennett, executive producers; John Walker, producer; Andrea Bocelli, performer; Myung-whun Chung, conductor	PBS
2000 (52nd)	Central Park (Great Performances)	David Horn and Jac Venza, executive producers; John Walker, producer	PBS
2000 (52nd)	Mostly Mozart Festival Opening Concert (Live from Lincoln Center)	John Goberman, producer	PBS
2000 (52nd)	Perlman @ The Penthouse (Live from Lincoln Center)	John Goberman, producer	PBS
2001 (53rd)
2001 (53rd)	Outstanding Classical Music-Dance Program		
2001 (53rd)	La Traviata from Paris (Great Performances)	Rada Rassimov, Paola Megas and Jac Venza, executive producers; Andrea Andermann, John Walker and David Horn, producers; Giuseppe Patroni Griffi, director; Zubin Mehta, conductor	PBS
2001 (53rd)	American Dream: Andrea Bocelli's Statue of Liberty Concert	David Horn, executive producer/director; Mitch Owgang, supervising producer; John Walker, producer	PBS
2001 (53rd)	Armstrong – When the Saints Go Marching In (Live from Lincoln Center)	John Goberman, producer; Marc Bauman, supervising producer	PBS
2001 (53rd)	Charlotte Church: Live from Jerusalem	Paul Burger and John Drury, executive producers; Anthony Geffen, producer; Kriss Russman, director; Charlotte Church, performer; Julian Smith, conductor	PBS
2001 (53rd)	The Three Tenors Christmas	Peter Gelb and Mario Dradi, executive producers; Dione Orrom and Mia Bongiovanni, producers; David Mallet, director; Steven Mercurio, conductor	PBS
2001 (53rd)	Outstanding Non-Fiction Program (Special Class)		
2001 (53rd)	Survivor	Mark Burnett and Charlie Parsons, executive producers; Craig Piligian, co-executive producer; Scott Messick and Tom Shelly, supervising producers; Maria Baltazzi, Jay Bienstock, John Feist and Teri Kennedy, producers; Jeff Probst, host	CBS
2001 (53rd)	Bands on the Run	Jane Lipsitz, Lauren Zalaznick and Dan Cutforth, executive producers; Eliot Goldberg and Julio Kollerbohm, supervising producers; Craig Borders, director	VH1
2001 (53rd)	Eco-Challenge: Borneo	Mark Burnett, executive producer; Lisa Hennessy, co-executive producer; Brady Connell, supervising producer; Maria Baltazzi, Jay Bienstock, Morgan Elliott, John Feist and Tim Powell, producers	USA
2001 (53rd)	Junkyard Wars	Cathy Rogers, executive producer/host; Alexandra Middendorf, executive producer; Rupert Parker and Nathaniel Grouille, producers; George Gray, host	TLC
2001 (53rd)	Road Rules: Maximum Velocity Tour	Mary-Ellis Bunim and Jonathan Murray, executive producers; Bruce Toms, producer; Rick Telles, director	MTV
2002 (54th)
2002 (54th)	Outstanding Classical Music-Dance Program		
2002 (54th)	Sweeney Todd in Concert	Chase Mishkin, executive producer; Ellen M. Krass and Morton Swinsky, co-executive producers; Iris Merlis and Jeff Thorsen, producers; Lonny Price, director	PBS
2002 (54th)	The Gershwins' Porgy and Bess with the New York City Opera (Live from Lincoln Center)	Marc Bauman, supervising producer; John Goberman, producer; John DeMain, conductor; Tazewell Thompson, director	PBS
2002 (54th)	Joshua Bell: West Side Story Suite from Central Park (Great Performances)	Peter Gelb and Jac Venza, executive producers; Laura Mitgang and Molly McBride, producers; Pat Jaffe, director; Joshua Bell, performer; William Eddins, conductor	PBS
2002 (54th)	Mostly Mozart Festival 2001 – Mozart's 'Requiem' (Live from Lincoln Center)	Marc Bauman, supervising producer; John Goberman, producer; Gerard Schwarz, conductor	PBS
2002 (54th)	Outstanding Special Class Program		
2002 (54th)	The West Wing Documentary Special	Thomas Schlamme, John Wells and Aaron Sorkin, executive producers; Kevin Falls, co-executive producer; Michael Hissrich, producer; Llewellyn Wells and Anne Sandkuhler, produced by; Bill Couturié, director/interview materials by; Eli Attie and Felicia Willson, interview materials by	NBC
2002 (54th)	AFI's 100 Years... 100 Thrills: America's Most Heart-Pounding Movies	Gary Smith, executive producer; Dann Netter, Bob Gazzale, Fred A. Rappoport and Frederick S. Pierce, producers	CBS
2002 (54th)	I Love Lucy's 50th Anniversary Special	Desi Arnaz Jr. and Lucie Arnaz, executive producers; Gary Smith, Fred A. Rappoport and Dann Netter, producers	CBS
2002 (54th)	Survivor	Mark Burnett, executive producer; Craig Piligian and Craig Armstrong, co-executive producers; Tom Shelly and Jay Bienstock, supervising producers; Cord Keller, senior producer; Maria Baltazzi, John Feist, Doug McCallie, Adam Briles, Teri Kennedy, Conrad Riggs, Bruce Beresford-Redman and Dennis Lofgren, producers; Jeff Probst, host	CBS
2002 (54th)	Trading Spaces	Denise Cramsey, executive producer; Susan Cohen-Dickler, Jan Dickler and Ray Murray, executive producers for Banyan Productions; Stephen H. Schwartz, executive producer for TLC; Alyssa Kaufman, Larry Blase and Aimee Kramer, producers; Paige Davis, host	TLC
2003 (55th)
2003 (55th)	Outstanding Classical Music-Dance Program		
2003 (55th)	Contact (Live from Lincoln Center)	John Goberman, executive producer; Marc Bauman, supervising producer	PBS
2003 (55th)	New Year's Eve All-Gershwin Concert (Live from Lincoln Center)	John Goberman, producer; Marc Bauman, supervising producer	PBS
2003 (55th)	Perlman at the Penthouse (Live from Lincoln Center)	John Goberman, producer; Marc Bauman, supervising producer	PBS
2003 (55th)	Pops Goes the Fourth! 2002	Elizabeth Cheng, executive producer; Delia Fine and Bill Harris, executive producers for A&E; Emilio Nunez, producer for A&E; Stella Gould, produced by; Bob Comiskey, directed by	A&E
Outstanding Special Class Program
2004 (56th)
2004 (56th)	New York City Ballet – Lincoln Center Celebrates Balanchine 100 (Live from Lincoln Center)	John Goberman, producer; Marc Bauman, supervising producer	PBS
2004 (56th)	The Dick Van Dyke Show Revisited	Carl Reiner, executive producer; Sal Maniaci, producer; Michael Petok, produced by	CBS
2004 (56th)	The Los Angeles Philharmonic Inaugurates Walt Disney Concert Hall (Great Performances)	Wayne Baruch, Charles F. Gayton, David Horn and Jac Venza, executive producers; Mona Niemiec, Mitch Owgang and John Walker, producers	PBS
2004 (56th)	Vivaldi, Haydn & Yo-Yo Ma (Live from Lincoln Center)	John Goberman, producer; Marc Bauman, supervising producer	PBS
2005 (57th)
2005 (57th)	Stephen Sondheim's "Passion" (Live from Lincoln Center)	John Goberman, executive producer; Marc Bauman, supervising producer	PBS
2005 (57th)	Agatha Christie's Miss Marple	Rebecca Eaton, Michele Buck, Damien Timmer and Phil Clymer, executive producers; Matthew Read, producer	PBS
2005 (57th)	Jazz at Lincoln Center: Grand Opening of Frederick P. Rose Hall – One Family of Jazz (Live from Lincoln Center)	John Goberman, executive producer; Marc Bauman, supervising producer	PBS
2005 (57th)	Leonard Bernstein's "Candide" in Concert (Great Performances)	Jac Venza, Ellen M. Krass and Morton Swinsky, executive producers; Iris Merlis and Jay Good, producers; David Horn, series producer; John Walker, senior producer of music; Marin Alsop, conducted by	PBS
2006 (58th)
2006 (58th)	Dance in America: Swan Lake with American Ballet Theatre (Great Performances)	Judy Kinberg, produced by	PBS
2006 (58th)	Jazz at Lincoln Center – Higher Ground Hurricane Relief Benefit Concert (Live from Lincoln Center)	John Goberman, executive producer; Marc Bauman, supervising producer	PBS
2006 (58th)	A Lincoln Center Special: 30 Years of Live from Lincoln Center	John Goberman, executive producer; Marc Bauman, supervising producer	PBS
2006 (58th)	South Pacific in Concert from Carnegie Hall (Great Performances)	Barry Schulman, executive producer; John Walker and David Horn, producers	PBS
2007 (59th)
2007 (59th)	The 60th Annual Tony Awards	Ricky Kirshner and Glenn Weiss, executive producers	CBS
2007 (59th)	The 64th Golden Globe Awards	Allen Shapiro and Barry Adelman, executive producers; Al Schwartz and Ken Shapiro, produced by	NBC
2007 (59th)	The 79th Annual Academy Awards	Laura Ziskin, producer; Michael B. Seligman, supervising producer	ABC
2007 (59th)	Jerry Seinfeld – The Comedian Award	John Moffitt, executive producer; Bob Crestani, co-executive producer; Douglas C. Forbes, supervising producer	HBO
2007 (59th)	Prince: Super Bowl XLI Halftime Show	Don Mischer, Ricky Kirshner and Glenn Weiss, executive producers	CBS
2008 (60th)
2008 (60th)	Outstanding Special Class — Awards Program		
2008 (60th)	The 61st Annual Tony Awards	Ricky Kirshner and Glenn Weiss, executive producers	CBS
2008 (60th)	The 80th Annual Academy Awards	Gilbert Cates, producer	ABC
2008 (60th)	Outstanding Special Class — Classical Musical / Dance Program		
2008 (60th)	New York City Opera: Madama Butterfly (Live from Lincoln Center)	John Goberman, executive producer; Marc Bauman, supervising producer	PBS
2008 (60th)	Outstanding Special Class — Not-Exclusively-Made-for-Television Variety, Music, Comedy Event Programs		
2008 (60th)	Eric Clapton Crossroads Guitar Festival Chicago (Great Performances)	John Beug, executive producer; Eric Clapton, Peter Jackson, James S. Pluta and Stephen 'Scooter' Weintraub, producers; David Horn, series producer	PBS
2009 (61st)
2009 (61st)	Beijing 2008 Olympic Games Opening Ceremony	Dick Ebersol, executive producer; David Neal, producer	NBC
2009 (61st)	The 62nd Annual Tony Awards	Glenn Weiss and Ricky Kirshner, executive producers; Whoopi Goldberg, host	CBS
2009 (61st)	The 81st Annual Academy Awards	Bill Condon and Laurence Mark, producers; Michael B. Seligman, supervising producer; Hugh Jackman, host	ABC
2009 (61st)	Carnegie Hall Opening Night 2008: A Celebration of Leonard Bernstein (Great Performances)	David Horn, executive producer; Bill O'Donnell, series producer; Mitch Owgang and John Walker, producers	PBS
2009 (61st)	George Carlin: The Kennedy Center Mark Twain Prize	Dalton Delan, David S. Thompson, Michael M. Kaiser, Cappy McGarr, Mark Krantz, Bob Kaminsky and Peter Kaminsky, executive producers	PBS

=== 2010s ===
Year	Program	Nominees	Network
2010 (62nd)
2010 (62nd)	The 63rd Annual Tony Awards	Ricky Kirshner and Glenn Weiss, executive producers; Neil Patrick Harris, host	CBS
2010 (62nd)	30 Rock: The Webisodes	Eric Gurian, William Sell and Clint Koltveit, producers	nbc.com
2010 (62nd)	The 82nd Annual Academy Awards	Adam Shankman and Bill Mechanic, producers; Michael B. Seligman, supervising producer; Alec Baldwin and Steve Martin, hosts	ABC
2010 (62nd)	ABC's Lost Presents: Mysteries of the Universe – The Dharma Initiative	Christopher J Powers, Ted Bramble, Agnes Chu and Gregg Nations, producers	abc.com/lost
2010 (62nd)	Avatar: Enter the World of Pandora	Thomas C. Grane and Jason Groff, producers	HBO
2010 (62nd)	The Daily Show: Ask a Correspondent	Rich Sullivan, Rachel Maceiras and Paul Beddoe-Stephens, co-executive producers; Judi Stroh, producer	thedailyshow.com
2010 (62nd)	Vancouver 2010 Olympic Winter Games Opening Ceremony	Dick Ebersol, executive producer; David Neal, producer	NBC
2011 (63rd)
2011 (63rd)	The 64th Annual Tony Awards	Ricky Kirshner and Glenn Weiss, executive producers; Sean Hayes, host	CBS
2011 (63rd)	The 53rd Annual Grammy Awards	Ken Ehrlich and John Cossette, executive producers	CBS
2011 (63rd)	The 68th Annual Golden Globe Awards	Barry Adelman and Orly Adelson, executive producers; Ricky Gervais, host	NBC
2011 (63rd)	The 83rd Annual Academy Awards	Bruce Cohen and Don Mischer, produced by; Michael B. Seligman, supervising producer; Anne Hathaway and James Franco, hosts	ABC
2012 (64th)
2012 (64th)	The 65th Annual Tony Awards	Ricky Kirshner and Glenn Weiss, executive producers; Neil Patrick Harris, producer/host	CBS
2012 (64th)	The 54th Annual Grammy Awards	Ken Ehrlich, executive producer; LL Cool J, host	CBS
2012 (64th)	The 69th Annual Golden Globe Awards	Barry Adelman and Orly Adelson, executive producers; Ricky Gervais, host	NBC
2012 (64th)	The 84th Annual Academy Awards	Brian Grazer and Don Mischer, producers; Michael B. Seligman, supervising producer; Billy Crystal, host	ABC
2012 (64th)	Herbie Hancock, Gustavo Dudamel, and the Los Angeles Philharmonic Celebrate Gershwin (Great Performances)	David Horn, executive producer for Great Performances; Bill O'Donnell, series producer; Bernhard Fleischer and John Walker, producers	PBS
2012 (64th)	Louis C.K.: Live at the Beacon Theatre	Louis C.K. and Dave Becky, executive producers; Blair Breard, producer	FX
2013 (65th)
2013 (65th)	The 66th Annual Tony Awards	Ricky Kirshner and Glenn Weiss, executive producers; Neil Patrick Harris, producer/host	CBS
2013 (65th)	The 70th Annual Golden Globe Awards	Barry Adelman, Orly Adelson and Allen Shapiro, executive producers; Tina Fey and Amy Poehler, hosts	NBC
2013 (65th)	London 2012 Olympic Games Opening Ceremony	Jim Bell, executive producer; Molly Solomon, Bucky Gunts, Joe Gesue and Carol Larson, producers	NBC
2013 (65th)	The Oscars	Craig Zadan and Neil Meron, producers; Michael B. Seligman, supervising producer; Seth MacFarlane, host	ABC
2013 (65th)	Rodgers & Hammerstein's Carousel (Live from Lincoln Center)	Andrew Carl Wilk, executive producer; Denise Graap, supervising producer; Douglas Chang, producer; Audra McDonald, host	PBS
2014 (66th)
2014 (66th)	The 67th Annual Tony Awards	Ricky Kirshner and Glenn Weiss, executive producers; Neil Patrick Harris, producer/host	CBS
2014 (66th)	The 71st Annual Golden Globe Awards	Barry Adelman, Allen Shapiro and Michael G. Mahan, executive producers; Tina Fey and Amy Poehler, hosts	NBC
2014 (66th)	The Oscars	Craig Zadan and Neil Meron, executive producers; Michael B. Seligman, supervising producer; Ellen DeGeneres, host	ABC
2014 (66th)	Sochi 2014 Olympic Winter Games Opening Ceremony	Jim Bell and Scott Givens, executive producers; Joe Gesue, Rebecca Chatman, Carol Larson, John Gilmartin, David W. Nuckolls and Thomas F. Bisignano, producers	NBC
2014 (66th)	The Sound of Music Live!	Craig Zadan and Neil Meron, executive producers; Priscilla Taussig, produced by	NBC
2015 (67th)
2015 (67th)	Sweeney Todd: The Demon Barber of Fleet Street (Live from Lincoln Center)	Andrew Carl Wilk, executive producer; Allen Kelman, supervising producer; Douglas Chang, producer; Elizabeth W. Scott, produced by; Audra McDonald, host	PBS
2015 (67th)	The 68th Annual Tony Awards	Ricky Kirshner and Glenn Weiss, executive producers; Hugh Jackman, host	CBS
2015 (67th)	The 72nd Annual Golden Globe Awards	Allen Shapiro, Mike Mahan and Barry Adelman, executive producers; Amy Poehler and Tina Fey, hosts	NBC
2015 (67th)	On the Run Tour: Beyoncé and Jay-Z	Beyoncé Knowles-Carter and Shawn "Jay-Z" Carter, executive producers/performers; Lee Anne Callahan-Longo, Desiree Perez, Erinn Williams and Cha-Ka Pilgrim, executive producers; Svana Gisla, Dan Parise and Ed Burke, producers	HBO
2015 (67th)	The Oscars	Craig Zadan and Neil Meron, executive producers; Michael B. Seligman, supervising producer; Neil Patrick Harris, host	ABC
2016 (68th)
2016 (68th)	Grease Live!	Marc Platt, executive producer; Thomas Kail and Alex Rudzinski, co-executive producers; Adam Siegel, producer; Greg Sills, produced by	Fox
2016 (68th)	The 69th Annual Tony Awards	Ricky Kirshner and Glenn Weiss, executive producers; Kristin Chenoweth and Alan Cumming, hosts	CBS
2016 (68th)	The 73rd Annual Golden Globe Awards	Allen Shapiro, Mike Mahan and Barry Adelman, executive producers; Ricky Gervais, host	NBC
2016 (68th)	The Oscars	David Hill and Reginald Hudlin, produced by; Michael B. Seligman, supervising producer; Chris Rock, host	ABC
2016 (68th)	Super Bowl 50 Halftime Show	Ricky Kirshner, executive producer; Robert Paine, supervising producer	CBS
2017 (69th)
2017 (69th)	The 70th Annual Tony Awards	Ricky Kirshner and Glenn Weiss, executive producers; Allen Kelman, supervising producer; James Corden, producer/host; Ben Winston, producer	CBS
2017 (69th)	Hairspray Live!	Craig Zadan and Neil Meron, executive producers; Alex Rudzinski, co-executive producer; Javier Winnik, supervising producer; Kenny Leon, producer; Robert Norris Catto, produced by	NBC
2017 (69th)	The Oscars	Michael De Luca and Jennifer Todd, produced by; Rob Paine, supervising producer; Jimmy Kimmel, host	ABC
2017 (69th)	Super Bowl LI Halftime Show Starring Lady Gaga	Ricky Kirshner, executive producer; Lady Gaga, performer	Fox
Outstanding Variety Special (Live)
2018 (70th)
2018 (70th)	Jesus Christ Superstar Live in Concert	Tim Rice, Andrew Lloyd Webber, Marc Platt, Craig Zadan (posthumous), Neil Meron, John Legend, Mike Jackson, Ty Stiklorius and Alex Rudzinski, executive producers; Javier Winnik, co-executive producer	NBC
2018 (70th)	The 60th Annual Grammy Awards	Ken Ehrlich, executive producer; Eric Cook, supervising producer; Ben Winston, producer; James Corden, host	CBS
2018 (70th)	The 75th Annual Golden Globe Awards	Allen Shapiro, Mike Mahan, Barry Adelman, Lorenzo Soria, Jorge Camara, Serge Rakhlin and Meher Tatna, executive producers; Linda Gierahn, supervising producer; Seth Meyers, host	NBC
2018 (70th)	Night of Too Many Stars: America Unites for Autism Programs	Jon Stewart, executive producer/host; Ricky Kirshner, Glenn Weiss, Robert Smigel, Michelle Smigel and Chris McShane, executive producers; James Dixon, co-executive producer; Jesse Craine, supervising producer; Max Werner, producer	HBO
2018 (70th)	The Oscars	Michael De Luca and Jennifer Todd, produced by; Rob Paine, supervising producer; Jimmy Kimmel, host	ABC
2019 (71st)
2019 (71st)	Live in Front of a Studio Audience: Norman Lear's 'All in the Family' and 'The Jeffersons'	Norman Lear, Jimmy Kimmel, Adam McKay, Justin Theroux, Will Ferrell and Brent Miller, executive producers; Eric Cook, co-executive producer	ABC
2019 (71st)	The 61st Grammy Awards	Ken Ehrlich and Ben Winston, executive producers; Eric Cook, supervising producer; Jesse Collins, Raj Kapoor, Chantel Sausedo and David Wild, producers; Alicia Keys, host	CBS
2019 (71st)	The 72nd Annual Tony Awards	Ricky Kirshner and Glenn Weiss, executive producers; Allen Kelman, supervising producer; Sara Bareilles and Josh Groban, hosts	CBS
2019 (71st)	The 76th Annual Golden Globe Awards	Allen Shapiro, Mike Mahan, Barry Adelman, Meher Tatna, Anke Hofmann, Janet Nepales and Ali Sar, executive producers; Linda Gierahn, supervising producer; Eric Gurian, producer; Andy Samberg and Sandra Oh, hosts	NBC
2019 (71st)	The Oscars	Donna Gigliotti and Glenn Weiss, produced by; Rob Paine, supervising producer	ABC
2019 (71st)	RENT	Marc Platt, Adam Siegel, Julie Larson, Allan Larson, Vince Totino, Scott Hemming and Alex Rudzinski, executive producers; Kenneth Ferrone and Gregory Sills, producers	Fox

=== 2020s ===
Year	Program	Nominees	Network
2020 (72nd)
2020 (72nd)	Live in Front of a Studio Audience: "All in the Family" and "Good Times"	Norman Lear, Jimmy Kimmel, Will Ferrell, Justin Theroux, Kerry Washington, James Burrows and Brent Miller, executive producers; Eric Cook, co-executive producer	ABC
2020 (72nd)	The 73rd Annual Tony Awards	Ricky Kirshner and Glenn Weiss, executive producers; Sarah Levine and Allen Kelman, supervising producers; Ben Winston, producer; James Corden, host	CBS
2020 (72nd)	The 77th Annual Golden Globe Awards	Mike Mahan, Amy Thurlow and Barry Adelman, executive producers; Linda Gierahn, supervising producer; Ricky Gervais, host	NBC
2020 (72nd)	The Oscars	Lynette Howell Taylor and Stephanie Allain, produced by; Rob Paine, supervising producer	ABC
2020 (72nd)	Super Bowl LIV Halftime Show Starring Jennifer Lopez and Shakira	Ricky Kirshner, executive producer; Jesse Craine, supervising producer; Jennifer Lopez and Shakira, performers	Fox
2021 (73rd)
2021 (73rd)	Stephen Colbert's Election Night 2020: Democracy's Last Stand Building Back America Great Again Better 2020	Stephen T. Colbert, executive producer/host; Chris Licht, Tom Purcell and Jon Stewart, executive producers; Tanya Michnevich Bracco, Barry Julien, Opus Moreschi and Denise Rehrig, co-executive producers; Aaron Cohen, Paul Dinello, Emily Gertler, Jay Katsir, Matt Lappin, Bjoern Stejskal and Sara Vilkomerson, supervising producers; Ballard C. Boyd, Michael Brumm, Gabe Gronli, Paige Kendig, Jake Plunkett and Adam Wager, producers	Showtime
2021 (73rd)	The 63rd Annual Grammy Awards	Ben Winston, executive producer; Jesse Collins and Raj Kapoor, co-executive producers; Eric Cook, supervising producer; Josie Cliff, Fatima Robinson, David Wild, Patrick Menton and Hamish Hamilton, producers; Trevor Noah, host	CBS
2021 (73rd)	Celebrating America – An Inauguration Night Special	Ricky Kirshner, Glenn Weiss, Stephanie Cutter and Rod O'Connor, executive producers; Rob Paine and Lisa Geers, supervising producers; Sarah Levine Hall, producer; Tom Hanks, host	(Note: Celebrating America — An Inauguration Night Special was simulcast on multiple television stations simultaneously. The Emmys listed no individual network with this nomination.)
2021 (73rd)	The Oscars	Steven Soderbergh, Stacey Sher and Jesse Collins, produced by; Rob Paine, supervising producer	ABC
2021 (73rd)	The Pepsi Super Bowl LV Halftime Show Starring The Weeknd	Shawn Carter, Desiree Perez and Jesse Collins, executive producers; Aaron Cooke, supervising producer; Dionne Harmon, Dan Parise and Dave Meyers, producers; Abel 'The Weeknd' Tesfaye, performer	CBS
2022 (74th)
2022 (74th)	The Pepsi Super Bowl LVI Halftime Show Starring Dr. Dre, Snoop Dogg, Mary J. Blige, Eminem, Kendrick Lamar, 50 Cent	Shawn Carter, Desiree Perez and Jesse Collins, executive producers; Dionne Harmon and Dave Meyers, co-executive producers; Aaron B. Cooke, supervising producer; Dr. Dre, Snoop Dogg, Mary J. Blige, Eminem, Kendrick Lamar and 50 Cent, performers	NBC
2022 (74th)	The 64th Annual Grammy Awards	Raj Kapoor, Ben Winston and Jesse Collins, executive producers; Jeannae Rouzan-Clay, co-executive producer; Eric Cook, supervising producer; Hamish Hamilton, Tabitha D'umo, Fatima Robinson, David Wild and Patrick Menton, producers; Trevor Noah, host	CBS
2022 (74th)	Live in Front of a Studio Audience: The Facts of Life and Diff'rent Strokes	Norman Lear, Brent Miller, Jimmy Kimmel, Will Ferrell, Justin Theroux, Kerry Washington and James Burrows, executive producers; Eric Cook, co-executive producer; James Dixon, producer	ABC
2022 (74th)	The Oscars	Will Packer and Shayla Cowan, produced by; Rob Paine, supervising producer	ABC
2022 (74th)	The Tony Awards Present: Broadway's Back!	Ricky Kirshner and Glenn Weiss, executive producers; Sarah Levine Hall, producer; Allen Kelman, supervising producer; Leslie Odom Jr., host	CBS
2023 (75th)
2023 (75th)	Elton John Live: Farewell from Dodger Stadium	Elton John, executive producer/performer; David Furnish, Luke Lloyd Davies, Ben Winston, Gabe Turner, Sally Wood, Emma Conway, Lou Fox, Sean Alvarez, Steven Solana and R. J. Cutler, executive producers; John Foy and Paul Dugdale, co-executive producers; Saj Patel and Penny LeVesconte, line producers	Disney+
2023 (75th)	75th Annual Tony Awards	Ricky Kirshner and Glenn Weiss, executive producers; Allen Kelman, supervising producer; Sarah Levine Hall, producer; Ariana DeBose, host	CBS
2023 (75th)	The Apple Music Super Bowl LVII Halftime Show Starring Rihanna	Shawn Carter, Desiree Perez, Jesse Collins and Jay Brown, executive producers; Dionne Harmon and Dave Meyers, co-executive producers; Aaron B. Cooke, supervising producer; Hamish Hamilton, producer; Rihanna, performer	Fox
2023 (75th)	Chris Rock: Selective Outrage	Chris Rock, executive producer/performer; Joel Gallen and Matthew Claybrooks, executive producers; Emily Wolfe, co-executive producer	Netflix
2023 (75th)	The Oscars	Ricky Kirshner, Molly McNearney and Glenn Weiss, executive producers; Rob Paine, co-executive producer; Sarah Levine Hall, Raj Kapoor, Jennifer Sharron and Erin Irwin, producers; Jimmy Kimmel, host	ABC
2024 (76th)
2024 (76th)	The Oscars	Raj Kapoor, Molly McNearney and Katy Mullan, executive producers; Rob Paine, co-executive producer; Taryn Hurd and Sarah Levine Hall, producers; Jimmy Kimmel, host	ABC
2024 (76th)	The Apple Music Super Bowl LVIII Halftime Show Starring Usher	Shawn Carter, Desiree Perez and Jesse Collins, executive producers; Dionne Harmon and Dave Meyers, co-executive producers; Aaron B. Cooke, supervising producer; Phil Sino-Cruz and Chelsea Gonnering, line producers; Usher, performer	CBS
2024 (76th)	The 66th Grammy Awards	Ben Winston, Raj Kapoor and Jesse Collins, executive producers; Eric Cook, Patrick Menton and Jeannae Rouzan-Clay, co-executive producers; Trevor Noah, producer/host; Hamish Hamilton, David Wild, Tabitha D'umo, Alexandra Papa and Rita Maye Bland, producers; Hilary Gladstein, line producer	CBS
2024 (76th)	The Greatest Roast of All Time: Tom Brady	Casey Patterson, Tom Brady, Jeff Clanagan, Jeff Ross and Carol Donovan, executive producers; Kevin Hart, executive producer/host; Mike Gibbons and Rob Paine, co-executive producers; Barbra Dannov and Pete DiObilda, supervising producers; Steven Kaplan, line producer	Netflix
2024 (76th)	The 76th Annual Tony Awards	Ricky Kirshner and Glenn Weiss, executive producers; Jesse Craine, supervising producer; Sarah Levine Hall, producer; Ariana DeBose, host	CBS
2025 (77th)
2025 (77th)	SNL50: The Anniversary Special	Lorne Michaels, executive producer; Javier Winnik, supervising producer; Erin Doyle, Tom Broecker, Caroline Maroney, Colin Jost and Michael Che, producers; Steve Higgins and Erik Kenward	NBC
2025 (77th)	The Apple Music Super Bowl LIX Halftime Show Starring Kendrick Lamar	Shawn Carter, Desiree Perez, Jesse Collins and Dave Free, executive producers; Dionne Harmon, Dave Meyers, Anthony Saleh and Cornell Brown, co-executive producers; Aaron B. Cooke, supervising producer; Jana Fleishman, producer; Phil Sino-Cruz and Chelsea Gonnering, line producers; Kendrick Lamar, performer	Fox
2025 (77th)	Beyoncé Bowl	Beyoncé Knowles-Carter, executive producer/performer; Justina Omokhua, Jesse Collins and Dionne Harmon, executive producers; Tanisha Whitfield, supervising producer; Alex Rudzinski, Alex Queen-Sneed and Brittany Brazil, producers	Netflix
2025 (77th)	The Oscars	Raj Kapoor and Katy Mullan, executive producers; Rob Paine, co-executive producer; Taryn Hurd, Sarah Levine Hall, Hamish Hamilton, Jeff Ross and Mike Sweeney, producers; Conan O'Brien, host	ABC
2025 (77th)	SNL50: The Homecoming Concert	Lorne Michaels and Mark Ronson, executive producers; Rob Paine and Ken Aymong, supervising producers; Sam Kruger, producer; Karen Scarminach, line producer; Erin David, produced by; Jimmy Fallon, host	Peacock
2026 (78th)
2026 (78th)	The Apple Music Super Bowl LX Halftime Show Starring Bad Bunny	Shawn Carter, Desiree Perez, Jesse Collins and Noah Assad, executive producers; Dave Meyers, co-executive producer; Jody Kolozsvari, supervising producer; Benito Antonio Martinez Ocasio "Bad Bunny", producer/performer; Jana Fleishman and Darren Pfeffer, producers; Chelsea Gonnering and John Kilgore, line producers	NBC
2026 (78th)	83rd Annual Golden Globes	Ricky Kirshner, Glenn Weiss, Jay Penske, Barry Adelman and Helen Hoehne, executive producers; Derek Browell, line producer; Nikki Glaser, host	CBS
2026 (78th)	68th Annual Grammy Awards	Ben Winston, Raj Kapoor and Jesse Collins, executive producers; Trevor Noah, executive producer/host; Eric Cook, Patrick Menton, Jeannae Rouzan-Clay and Tabitha Dumo, co-executive producers; Hilary Gladstein, supervising producer; Hamish Hamilton, David Wild, Rita Maye Bland, Dave Piendak and Eboni Nichols, producers	CBS
2026 (78th)	The Oscars	Raj Kapoor and Katy Mullan, executive producers; Rob Paine, co-executive producer; Taryn Hurd, Sarah Levine Hall, Hamish Hamilton, Jeff Ross and Mike Sweeney, producers; Stefani Ramirez and Shelby Sundling, line producers; Conan O'Brien, host	ABC
2026 (78th)	78th Annual Tony Awards	Ricky Kirshner and Glenn Weiss, executive producers; Cynthia Erivo, producer/host; Gillian Appleby and Allison Roithinger, supervising producers; Amanda McDonough, line producer	CBS
