= Venza =

Venza may refer to:

- Toyota Venza, motor vehicle
- Jac Venza, American television producer
