= David Robertson (conductor) =

American conductor (born 1958)

- Born: July 19, 1958 (age 68); Malibu, California, U.S.
- Spouse: Orli Shaham (m. 2003)
- Children: 4

David Eric Robertson (born July 19, 1958) is an American conductor. He was chief conductor of the Sydney Symphony Orchestra, and was formerly music director of the St. Louis Symphony Orchestra from 2005 until 2018. He is Director of Orchestral Studies at Juilliard.

== Early life and education ==
Robertson was born and raised in Malibu, California, and grew up in a music-loving family. His father was a research scientist at Hughes Laboratory and his mother studied literature, but later had a career as a baker. In grade school, he played French horn and violin, and first conducted at age 12. He later studied horn, composition, and conducting as a college student at the Royal Academy of Music in London.

== Career ==
After his college years, Robertson began to receive conducting offers in Europe and performed often in both symphonic and operatic repertoire. His early career lectured under the rubric of the U.S. Information Agency in the Middle East and around the world on the subject of music. In 1985, Robertson was appointed resident conductor of the Jerusalem Symphony Orchestra.

From 1992 to 2000, Robertson was music director of the Paris-based Ensemble Intercontemporain (EIC), the first American to hold the post. He broadened the EIC's repertoire to include works by composers such as John Adams. In 2000, Robertson was named the music director of the Orchestre National de Lyon (ONL) and artistic director of Lyon's Auditorium. He was the first individual to serve simultaneously in both capacities and the first American to be appointed to either position. He and the ONL toured the United States in 2003, with concerts in New York City, Seattle, Berkeley, and Los Angeles. He concluded his tenure in Lyon in 2004.

=== St. Louis Symphony Orchestra ===
Robertson's relationship with the St. Louis Symphony Orchestra (SLSO) began in January 1999 when he made his first conducting appearance with the orchestra. Robertson's second appearance with the SLSO occurred in February 2002 at Carnegie Hall after the SLSO's then-music director Hans Vonk withdrew a few days before the concert due to health problems. Robertson agreed to substitute, and he and the orchestra had only one rehearsal before the concert. He later appeared with the SLSO in March 2003. The SLSO named Robertson its next music director in December 2003, effective with the 2005-2006 season.

In April 2005, Robertson led the SLSO for the second time in a Carnegie Hall concert, after a labor dispute at the SLSO was resolved. Robertson conducted the SLSO in Carnegie Hall again in November 2005, March and April 2006, and March 2007. Robertson was one of Carnegie Hall's Perspectives artists for the 2005-2006 season, and he curated concerts with the SLSO and other performances with various guest artists and ensembles.

Robertson is generally regarded as having restored the SLSO's artistic prominence after the sudden resignation of the prior music director Hans Vonk, and the orchestra's labor dispute in the winter of 2005. New concert series begun during his tenure include a group of contemporary music concerts with the Pulitzer Arts Foundation and a series of "Fusion Concerts" at the Touhill Performing Arts Center of the University of Missouri–St. Louis. In September 2006, the SLSO announced the extension of Robertson's contract through 2010, with a clause to allow for yearly renewal. As of November 2009, his SLSO contract was through the 2011-2012 season. Following a subsequent contract renewal through 2014, his SLSO contract was extended, in January 2013, through the 2015-2016 season.c In March 2014, the orchestra and Robertson announced a further extension of his SLSO contract through the 2017-2018 season. In December 2016, the SLSO and Robertson jointly announced an additional one-year extension of his contract through the 2018-2019 season, which was the intended time for the close of his SLSO tenure. However, in June 2017, the orchestra noted an update to Robertson's contract, with a newly scheduled conclusion of his music directorship at the close of the 2017-2018 season, in a reversion of the December 2016 situation. Robertson stood down as SLSO music director in 2018.

During Robertson's tenure, the SLSO made its first-ever appearance at The Proms in September 2012. With the SLSO, Robertson has conducted several commercial recordings of music of John Adams for the Nonesuch label. These works include:

- Guide to Strange Places, Doctor Atomic Symphony (revised version)
- City Noir, Saxophone Concerto
- Scheherazade.2

=== Other conducting work ===
In February 2005, Robertson was named the principal guest conductor of the BBC Symphony Orchestra (BBC SO) and he assumed that post later in the year, in parallel with the beginning of his St. Louis tenure. On September 12, 2009, Robertson became the second American conductor and the first standing BBC SO principal guest conductor to conduct the Last Night of the Proms. He concluded his tenure as the BBC SO's principal guest conductor in August 2012.

Robertson first guest-conducted the Sydney Symphony Orchestra in 2003. In 2014, he became the Sydney Symphony Orchestra's chief conductor and artistic adviser. He concluded his tenure in Sydney in December 2019, following a one-year extension of his contract announced in July 2017.

Robertson's other work in contemporary music has included serving as Festival Director for the Los Angeles Philharmonic's January 2008 Concrete Frequency Festival, as well as music director of the 2008 Ojai Music Festival in Ojai, California. His work in opera has included several appearances at the Metropolitan Opera, including Janáček's The Makropulos Affair (1996), Mozart's Die Entführung aus dem Serail (2008), Britten's Billy Budd (2012). and Mozart's The Marriage of Figaro in 2012. Robertson also conducted the first production of The Death of Klinghoffer at the Metropolitan Opera in October 2014. In February 2018, the Juilliard School announced the appointment of Robertson as its next director of conducting studies, effective with the 2018-2019 academic year.

Robertson first guest-conducted the Utah Symphony in October 2020. He returned for an additional guest-conducting engagement with the Utah Symphony in December 2021. In December 2022, the Utah Symphony announced the appointment of Robertson as its first-ever creative partner, effective with the 2023-2024 season, with a contract of 3 years.

Robertson has recorded for the Sony Classical, Harmonia Mundi, Naive, EMI/Virgin Classics, Atlantic/Erato, Nuema, Ades Valois, Naxos and Nonesuch labels, featuring the music of such composers as Adams, Bartók, Boulez, Carter, Dusapin, Dvorák, Ginastera, Lalo, Manoury, Milhaud, Reich, Saint-Saëns, and Silvestrov.

== Personal life ==
Robertson has been married three times, and divorced just once. His third wife is pianist Orli Shaham, the sister of violinist Gil Shaham. Robertson and Shaham first met at a January 1999 SLSO concert, which was the SLSO debut for both of them. They married on January 3, 2003. She is mother to their twin boys, Nathan Glenn, and Alex Jacob, born September 15, 2007. The family makes its home in New York City. Robertson has two grown sons, Peter and Jonathan, from his second marriage to the German writer Ane Dahm.

== Honors and awards ==
Robertson received the Seaver/National Endowment for the Arts Conductors Award in 1997. In December 1999, Musical America named David Robertson Conductor of the Year. Robertson received the 2006 Ditson Conductor's Award from Columbia University for his championing of American music. In April 2010, Robertson was elected a Fellow of the American Academy of Arts and Sciences. On May 15, 2010, Robertson received the degree Doctor of Music honoris causa from Westminster Choir College in Princeton, New Jersey. In October 2011, Robertson was named a Chevalier des Arts et des Lettres by the Ministry of Culture of France. His recording of John Adams' 'City Noir' won a Grammy. His recording of Porgy and Bess also won a Grammy, and his recording of John Adams' Scheherazade.2 was nominated for a Grammy, and he has had two other Grammy nominations.

Along with Diana Doherty, Sydney Symphony Orchestra, Nigel Westlake and Synergy Vocals, Robertson was nominated for the 2019 ARIA Award for Best Classical Album for the album Nigel Westlake: Spirit of the Wild / Steve Reich: The Desert Music. The album is a recording of Nigel Westlake's Spirit of the Wild and of Steve Reich’s The Desert Music with the latter conducted by Robertson.

Cultural offices
Preceded by Emmanuel Krivine	Music Director, Orchestre National de Lyon; 2000-2004	Succeeded by Jun Märkl
