= Gil Shaham =

American violinist (born 1971)

- גיל שחם
- Born: February 19, 1971 (age 55); Urbana, Illinois, U.S.
- Education: Rubin Academy of Music
- Occupations: Classical violinist; Academic teacher
- Organizations: Bard College Conservatory of Music

Gil Shaham (Hebrew: גיל שחם; born February 19, 1971) is an American violinist. His accolades include a Grammy Award in 1999, and he has performed as a soloist with such orchestras as the New York Philharmonic, Berlin Philharmonic, Vienna Philharmonic, Israel Philharmonic Orchestra, Chicago Symphony Orchestra, Cleveland Orchestra, San Francisco Symphony, Russian National Orchestra, Academy of St Martin in the Fields, Cincinnati Symphony Orchestra, and the Orchestre de Paris.

== Early life and career ==
Gil Shaham was born in Urbana, Illinois, while his Israeli parents were on an academic fellowship at the University of Illinois. His father, Jacob, was an astrophysicist and his mother, Meira Diskin, was a cytogeneticist. His sister is the pianist Orli Shaham. His brother, Shai Shaham, is the head of the Laboratory of Developmental Genetics at Rockefeller University.

When he was two years old, the family moved to Jerusalem, where at age seven he started violin lessons at the Rubin Academy of Music, winning annual scholarships from the America-Israel Cultural Foundation. He went on to graduate from the Horace Mann School in New York. He attended the Aspen Music Festival and School in Colorado, studying with Dorothy DeLay and Jens Ellermann, and won a scholarship to the Juilliard School. He and his sister Orli also studied at Columbia University.

Shaham lives in New York City and teaches at Bard College Conservatory of Music. He is married to violinist Adele Anthony. They have three children.

== Career ==
Shaham debuted as a soloist with the Jerusalem Symphony at age 10. He performed with the Israel Philharmonic—Israel's foremost orchestra—less than a year later. Shaham won first prize in the Claremont Competition at age 11, and was admitted to Juilliard, where he studied with Dorothy DeLay and Hyo Kang.

Shaham's career advanced in 1989 when, while a senior at Horace Mann, he replaced an ailing Itzhak Perlman to perform the Bruch and Sibelius violin concertos with the London Symphony Orchestra at the Royal Festival Hall.

Shaham won the Avery Fisher Career Grant in 1990, and the Premio Internazionale of the Accademia Chigiana in Siena in 1992.

Shaham has performed with the New York Philharmonic, Berlin Philharmonic, Toronto Symphony Orchestra, Vienna Philharmonic, Israel Philharmonic Orchestra, Chicago Symphony Orchestra, Boston Symphony Orchestra, Los Angeles Philharmonic, Russian National Orchestra, Academy of St Martin in the Fields, San Francisco Symphony Orchestra, Philadelphia Orchestra, National Symphony Orchestra and National Youth Orchestra of the United States of America.

In 2021, he was a soloist with the Naumburg Orchestral Concerts, in the Naumburg Bandshell, Central Park, in the summer series.

Shaham has played the "Comtesse de Polignac", a Stradivarius violin of 1699 on loan from the Stradivarius Society of Chicago since 1989.

== Discography ==
External audio
- You may hear Gil Shaham with Goran Sollscher performing works by Niccolo Paganini in 1992; Here on Archive.org

- Mendelssohn, Bruch: Violin Concertos (with Giuseppe Sinopoli conducting the Philharmonia Orchestra) (1990)
- Schumann: Works for Violin and Piano (1990)
- Franck / Saint-Saëns: Violin Sonatas (with Gerhard Oppitz) (1991)
- Paganini: Violin Concerto No. 1 / Saint-Saëns: Violin Concerto No. 3 (with Giuseppe Sinopoli conducting the New York Philharmonic) (1992)
- Wieniawski: Violin Concertos Nos. 1 and 2 (with Lawrence Foster conducting the London Symphony Orchestra) (1992)
- Sibelius/Tchaikovsky: Violin Concertos (with Giuseppe Sinopoli conducting the Philharmonia Orchestra) (1993)
- Samuel Barber: Violin Concerto; Erich Wolfgang Korngold: Violin Concerto and Much Ado about Nothing Suite (with Andre Previn conducting the London Symphony Orchestra) (1994)
- Paganini for Two (with Göran Söllscher) (1994)
- Vivaldi: The Four Seasons (with Orpheus Chamber Orchestra) (1995)
- Prokofiev: Violin Concertos Nos. 1 and 2 (with Andre Previn conducting the London Symphony Orchestra) (1996)
- Violin Romances (with Orpheus Chamber Orchestra) (1996)
- Dvořák for Two (with Orli Shaham) (1997)
- The Fiddler of the Opera (with Jascha Heifetz) (1997)
- Israel Philharmonic 60th Anniversary Gala Concert (1997)
- Berlin Gala: A Salute to Carmen (with Anne Sofie von Otter and Roberto Alagna) (1998)
- American Scenes (Works of Copland, Previn, Barber, Gershwin) (1998)
- Glazunov / Kabalevsky: Meeting in Moscow (1998)
- Bartók: Violin Concerto No. 2 (with Pierre Boulez conducting the Chicago Symphony Orchestra) (1999)
- Pärt: Tabula Rasa (1999)
- Devil's Dance (2000)
- Two Worlds (with Lee Ritenour and Dave Grusin) (2000)
- John Williams: Treesong / Violin Concerto / 3 Pieces from Schindler's List (with John Williams conducting the Boston Symphony Orchestra) (2001)
- Messiaen: Quartet for the End of Time (with Myung-Whun Chung) (2001)
- Brahms: Violin Concerto / Double Concerto (with Jian Wang and Claudio Abbado conducting the Berlin Philharmonic) (2002)
- Schubert for Two (with Göran Söllscher) (2003)
- The Fauré Album (2003)
- Prokofiev: Works for Violin and Piano (with Orli Shaham) (2004)
- Beethoven: Triple Concerto / Septet (with David Zinman and Yefim Bronfman) (2006)
- The Butterfly Lovers' Concerto for Violin / Tchaikovsky: Violin Concerto (2007)
- Mozart in Paris (with Orli Shaham) (2008)
- Elgar: Violin Concerto (with David Zinman conducting the Chicago Symphony Orchestra) (2008)
- Tchaikovsky: Piano Trio in A Minor (with Yefim Bronfman and Truls Mørk) (2008)
- Sarasate: Virtuoso Violin Works (with Adele Anthony) (2009)
- Haydn: Violin Concertos / Mendelssohn: Octet (with the Sejong Soloists) (2010)
- Nigunim: Hebrew Melodies (with Orli Shaham) (2013)
- 1930s Violin Concertos (2014)
- Bach: Sonatas and Partitas for Solo Violin (2015)

== Awards ==
- Avery Fisher Career Grant (1990)
- Premio Internazionale of the Accademia Chigiana in Siena (1992)
- Grammy Award for Best Chamber Music Performance: André Previn & Gil Shaham for American Scenes (Works of Copland, Previn, Barber, Gershwin) (1999)
- Avery Fisher Award (2008) Presented by his dear friend Gustavo Dudamel at a Live from Lincoln Center private presentation of the music of Pablo de Sarasate in the Stanley H. Kaplan Penthouse.
- Instrumentalist of the Year (2012)
