= Scheherazade.2 =

2015 symphony by John Adams

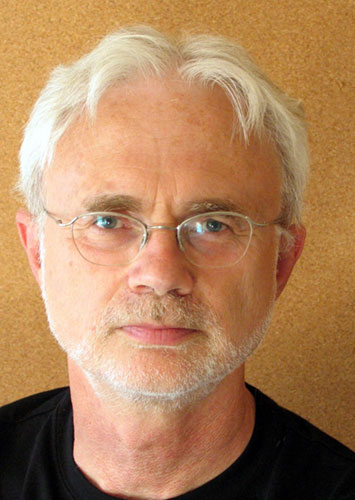
John Adams in 2008

Scheherazade.2 is a dramatic symphony for solo violin and orchestra by the American composer John Adams. The work was jointly commissioned by the New York Philharmonic, the Concertgebouw & the Royal Concertgebouw Orchestra, and the Sydney Symphony Orchestra. It was written specifically for the violinist Leila Josefowicz, who performed its world premiere with the New York Philharmonic under Alan Gilbert at Avery Fisher Hall on March 26, 2015.

== Composition ==
=== Background ===
Adams was inspired to write the piece after visiting an exhibit on the history of the Arabian Nights at the Arab World Institute in Paris. According to the score program note, the composer was struck by "the casual brutality toward women that lies at the base of many of these tales" and how women are still oppressed and abused in modern society. He wrote, "In the old tale Scheherazade is the lucky one who, through her endless inventiveness, is able to save her life. But there is not much to celebrate here when one thinks that she is spared simply because of her cleverness and ability to keep on entertaining her warped, murderous husband." Adams continued, "So I was suddenly struck by the idea of a 'dramatic symphony' in which the principal character role is taken by the solo violin—and she would be Scheherazade." The symphony thus follows a loose narrative through "a set of provocative images" about a modern Scheherazade's struggle in a patriarchal society.

=== Structure ===
Scheherazade.2 has a duration of roughly 50 minutes and is composed in four movements:

1. Tale of the Wise Young Woman – Pursuit by the True Believers
2. A Long Desire (Love Scene)
3. Scheherazade and the Men with Beards
4. Escape, Flight, Sanctuary

=== Instrumentation ===
The work is scored for solo violin and a large orchestra comprising two flutes (doubling piccolo), two oboes, two clarinets, bass clarinet, two bassoons, contrabassoon, four horns, two trumpets, three trombones, three percussionists, two harps, cimbalom, celesta, and strings.

== Reception ==
Scheherazade.2 has been praised by music critics. Reviewing the world premiere, George Grella of the New York Classical Review called the piece "a welcome return to form for a composer who, at his best, doesn't just create satisfying music but extends the classical tradition." He added, "This is a big sprawling piece, an attempt at a grand dramatic narrative that turns the central character of the Arabian Nights into a feminist heroine who rebels against a patriarchal society and finds her freedom. Adams is a storytelling composer, so along with the sheer sound and experience of the music, one listens for how well the story is told." The performance was also lauded by Anthony Tommasini of The New York Times, who wrote, "Long an Adams champion, Ms. Josefowicz gave a dazzling and inspired performance, backed by the glittering, rhapsodic and supremely confident playing of the orchestra under Mr. Gilbert."

Reviewing a later performance by Josefowicz and the London Symphony Orchestra under the composer, Andrew Clements of The Guardian said the symphony "follows a convincing symphonic shape, with a dialectical first movement that contrasts different blocks of musical material, a sometimes anguished slow movement, fierce climactic scherzo, and a finale that gradually discharges the tension and finds quiet resolution." He continued, "Adams’s music is as eclectic as ever; sometimes a bit soft-centred, perhaps, with solo-violin writing that does not go much beyond Prokofiev, but stuffed with allusions to a panoply of 20th-century models, with Messiaen the most surprising inclusion."

Josefowicz's performance of Scheherazade.2 with the St. Louis Symphony on a 2016 Nonesuch recording received a Grammy nomination for Best Classical Instrumental Solo. The performance was conducted by David Robertson.
