= Adele Anthony =

Australian-American violinist (born 1970)

Adele Anthony (born 1 October 1970) is an Australian-American violinist. In 1984, at age 13, she was the youngest winner of the ABC Instrumental and Vocal Competition; she later won other international competitions and studied in New York. She is now based in the United States, where she lives with her husband Gil Shaham, and tours and records.

== Biography ==
Adele Anthony was born in Singapore as the daughter of Alphonse Jivaras Anthony, the founding concertmaster of the Singapore Symphony Orchestra. She began to play the violin at the age of two and a half when the family settled in Tasmania. She subsequently attended Dernancourt Primary School, South Australia, and studied violin in Adelaide with Lyndall Hendrickson and Beryl Kimber. In her high school years, she attended Pembroke School, Kensington and Saint Ignatius'College Athelstone.

At age 13, in 1984, Anthony was the youngest winner of the ABC Instrumental and Vocal Competition, (now known as the ABC Symphony Australia Young Performers Awards), performing the Violin Concerto by Jean Sibelius with the Queensland Symphony Orchestra. She subsequently studied with Dorothy DeLay at the Juilliard School in New York for eight years. In 1996 she was the winner of the Carl Nielsen International Violin Competition.

Her recordings include Philip Glass's Violin Concerto No. 1 (1999/2000 on Naxos Records), Arvo Pärt's Tabula Rasa with Gil Shaham, Neeme Järvi and the Gothenburg Symphony Orchestra (on Deutsche Grammophon) and Ross Edwards' Concerto for Violin and Orchestra, Maninyas / Sibelius's Violin Concerto in D minor with the Adelaide Symphony Orchestra conducted by Arvo Volmer (Canary Classics CC09).

She is married to violinist Gil Shaham. They have three children.

== Bibliography ==
- Philippe, Borer, Aspects of European Influences on Violin Playing & Teaching in Australia, M.Mus. diss., 1988 (on Adele Anthony's early training, see Appendix D, pp. 182–193) https://eprints.utas.edu.au/18865/
- Lyndall Hendrickson, A longitudinal Study of Precocity in Music, in Giftedness, a Continuing Worldwide Challenge, edited by A. J. Cropley, New York, Trillium Press, 1985, pp. 192–203
- Brian Wise, Playing with fire [interview with Gil Shaham], in «The Strad», vol. 120 n. 1436 (December 2009), pp. 26–30.
