= Orli Shaham =

Israeli-American pianist (born 1975)

- אוֹרלי שחם
- Born: 5 November 1975 (age 51); Jerusalem
- Spouse: David Robertson (m. 2003)
- Musical career
- Occupation: Pianist

Orli Shaham (Hebrew: אוֹרלי שחם; born 5 November 1975) is an American pianist, born in Jerusalem, the daughter of scientists Meira Shaham (née Diskin) and Jacob Shaham. Her brothers are the violinist Gil Shaham and Shai Shaham, who is the head of the Laboratory of Developmental Genetics at Rockefeller University.

She is a graduate of the Horace Mann School in Riverdale, New York, and of Columbia University. She also studied at the Juilliard School, beginning in its Pre-college Division and continuing while a student at Columbia.

Orli Shaham performs recitals and appears with major orchestras throughout the world. She was awarded the Gilmore Young Artist Award in 1995 and the Avery Fisher Career Grant in 1997. Her appearances with orchestras include the Philadelphia Orchestra, Los Angeles Philharmonic, San Francisco Symphony, Chicago Symphony Orchestra, Detroit and Atlanta Symphonies, Orchestre National de Lyon, National Symphony Orchestra of Taiwan, Cleveland Orchestra, Houston Symphony, St. Louis Symphony, Florida Orchestra, Rochester Philharmonic, Orchestra of La Scala (Milan), Orchestra della Toscana (Florence), Malaysian Philharmonic Orchestra, and the São Paulo State Symphony Orchestra.

In November 2008, she began her tenure as artistic advisor to the Pacific Symphony and curator of its "Cafe Ludwig" chamber music series.

In 2020, Orli Shaham was named as Regular Guest Host and Creative for NPR's “From the Top”, the nationally broadcast radio program featuring performances and conversations with teenage musicians. She also served as the host of America's Music Festivals in 2012 and 2013, and from 2005 to 2008 she was host of Classical Public Radio Network's "Dial-a-Musician" in which she called expert colleagues to answer listener questions. For this program, she interviewed more than forty artists, including John Adams, Emanuel Ax, Natalie Dessay, Christine Brewer, Colin Currie, and others.

In 2003, Shaham married David Robertson, then music director of the St. Louis Symphony Orchestra, and became stepmother of his sons, Peter and Jonathan. Shaham and Robertson are the parents of twin sons Nathan Glenn and Alex Jacob, born in 2007 in New York City.

== Discography ==
- Mozart Piano Concertos (with SLSO and David Robertson) (2019)
- Letters from Gettysburg (2019)
- Alberto Ginastera: One Hundred (with Gil Shaham, violin) (2016)
- Brahms Inspired (2015)
- American Grace: Piano Music from Steve Mackey and John Adams (with pianist Jon Kimura Parker, Los Angeles Philharmonic, and conductor David Robertson) (2015)
- Nigunim: Hebrew Melodies (with violinist Gil Shaham) (2013)
- Chamber Music for Horn (with Richard King, horn) (2012)
- Behold the Bold Umbrellaphant (with pianist Jon Kimura Parker and San Diego Symphony) (2011)
- Mozart in Paris (with violinist Gil Shaham) (2008)
- Mozart: Violin Sonatas (with violinist Gil Shaham) (DVD; 2006)
- Prokofiev: works for violin and piano (with violinist Gil Shaham) (2004)
- Dvorak for Two (with violinist Gil Shaham) (1997)
