= Max Goberman =

20th-century American composer

- Born: 8 February 1911; Philadelphia, Pennsylvania, US
- Died: 31 December 1962 (aged 51)
- Genres: Broadway musicals; Classical music
- Occupation: Conductor
- Works: Conducting Leonard Bernstein's On the Town and West Side Story; The Beggar's Opera, and other works
- Years active: 1930–1962
- Label: Library of Recorded Masterpieces (self)
- Spouse: Jean Schneider
- Education: Curtis Institute of Music
- Children: John Goberman

Max Goberman (8 February 1911 – 31 December 1962) was an American conductor. He conducted ballets, Broadway musicals (including the original productions of Leonard Bernstein's On the Town and West Side Story), and the classical repertoire. At the time of his death, he was approximately halfway through working on the first recording of the complete symphonies of Joseph Haydn.

== Biography ==
=== Early life ===
Max Goberman was born on 8 February 1911 in Philadelphia, Pennsylvania to a Jewish couple, Morris Goberman and Aide (née Budilow). He studied violin with Leopold Auer, and conducting with Fritz Reiner at the Curtis Institute of Music. He was a violinist with the Philadelphia Orchestra before Reiner's recommendation gained him his first conducting appointment. He was Assistant Conductor for the Ballet Russe de Monte Carlo's 1939 Australian tour. That year he conducted Aaron Copland's music for the documentary The City, with the narrator Morris Carnovsky.

He married Jean Schneider and they had a son, John Goberman.

=== 1940s and Broadway career ===
In 1941 his first Broadway job was as musical director for three ballets at the Majestic Theater, including Three Virgins and a Devil by Agnes de Mille. It was Goberman who suggested that de Mille approach Morton Gould to be her collaborator in Fall River Legend – a suggestion she nearly rejected because she knew of Gould only through his radio broadcasts.

In 1944 he conducted the Baltimore premiere of Vincent Youmans’ Ballet Revue, on its pre-Broadway tour (it closed before reaching New York City). Although Youmans produced the show, he contributed no music; instead, Goberman conducted the Antar Ballet from Rimsky-Korsakov’s second symphony, Ravel’s Daphnis and Chloe (both choreographed by Massine, and three ballets by Ernesto Lecuona with choreography by Eugene Van Grona.

In 1945 he conducted the film score of Histadrut, an American/Palestinian co-production. He orchestrated The Beggar's Opera and conducted it on Broadway.

Max Goberman's first musical was Bernstein's On the Town in 1944. He later premiered West Side Story in 1957; and was nominated for a Tony Award for his involvement. His other work on Broadway included Billion Dollar Baby (1945–46), Where's Charley? (1948–50), A Tree Grows in Brooklyn (1951), and Milk and Honey (1961). In 1948 he conducted at the inaugural season of the National Ballet of Cuba.

=== Later life and death ===
In 1960 he started a project to record all the symphonies of Joseph Haydn with the Vienna State Opera Orchestra, for his own subscription label, the Library of Recorded Masterpieces. Had he survived, it would have been the first complete recording of the symphonies. He had completed only 40 (or 45) symphonies when he died suddenly at the end of 1962, aged only 51. Some of these recordings were later released on CBS's Odyssey label, but the sound was poor due to the centre channel being held back. The horn playing on Symphony No. 48 Maria Theresia is still renowned.

He started to record the complete works of Antonio Vivaldi, but this project was never realised; he did, however, record over 70 works. His recording of Vivaldi's Concerto in C for mandolin, strings and harpsichord was heard on the soundtrack of Kramer vs. Kramer. He also recorded works by Arcangelo Corelli (the 12 Concerti Grossi) and William Boyce (the 8 symphonies). In 1938 he conducted for Joseph Szigeti in a recording of works by Bach, Tartini and Mozart.
