= Guide to Strange Places =

Orchestral composition by John Adams

Guide to Strange Places is an orchestral composition by the American composer John Adams. The work was commissioned by the Amsterdam broadcasting company VARA, the BBC Symphony Orchestra, and the Sydney Symphony Orchestra. It was given its world premiere by the Netherlands Radio Philharmonic Orchestra under the direction of Adams at the Concertgebouw, Amsterdam, on October 6, 2001.

== Composition ==
Guide to Strange Places is composed in a single movement and has a duration of roughly 24 minutes.

=== Background ===
Adams first conceived the work when he stumbled across a guidebook called Guide Noir de la Provence Mystérieuse (The Black Guide to Mysterious Places of Provence) while vacationing with his family in France. He later wrote:

It was one of those typically French guides—minutely detailed and bristling with information and odd facts about the area (Provence): in this location there was a strange geological formation; in another unusual climatic occurrences; somewhere else a horrific historical event had taken place or perhaps a miracle had been witnessed. A chapter was dedicated to "paysages insolites"—or "strange places". Each classication came with its own special identifying icon. It set my imagination off... In a sense, all of my pieces are travel pieces, often through paysages insolites – it's the way I experience musical form.

=== Instrumentation ===
The work is scored for a large orchestra comprising piccolo, two flutes (2nd doubling piccolo), two oboes, English horn, two clarinets, bass clarinet, contrabass clarinet, two bassoons, contrabassoon, four horns, three trumpets, three trombones, tuba, timpani, four percussionists, harp, piano, celesta, and strings.

== Reception ==
Guide to Strange Places has received mixed praise from music critics. Barry Witherden of BBC Music Magazine wrote, "The early stages are filled with bright, eager expectation, but soon unease creeps in, paving the way for loping menace, apprehension and brutal, hammering figures." Andrew Clements of The Guardian compared the work favorably to Adams's Doctor Atomic Symphony, remarking, "Inspired apparently by a French guidebook to Provence, that is a far more focused and darkly disquieting piece; full of nervous, hyperactive figuration, unexpected twists and almost surreal musical imagery, it's one of Adams's most impressive achievements of the last decade."

Conversely, Ivan Hewett of The Daily Telegraph described it as "one of those frustrating Adams pieces that begins thrillingly and then loses its way." Philip Clark of Gramophone similarly called it "a great title that's been waiting for a piece" and opined, "What does it add up to? File under 'enjoyable escapism'. Unlike the natural charm of, say, The Sorcerer's Apprentice, Adams needs to turn his charm on. A jazzy, wolf-whistling riff appears from nowhere that sounds like pure Bernstein – and a contrived sprinkling of Disney-like tinsel before the hard-hitting end-point."

== Recording ==
A recording of Guide to Strange Places performed by the St. Louis Symphony under David Robertson was released through Nonesuch Records on July 28, 2009. The album also features Adams's Doctor Atomic Symphony.
