= Beryl Kimber =

Australian violinist and educator (1928–2022)

Beryl Kimber OBE
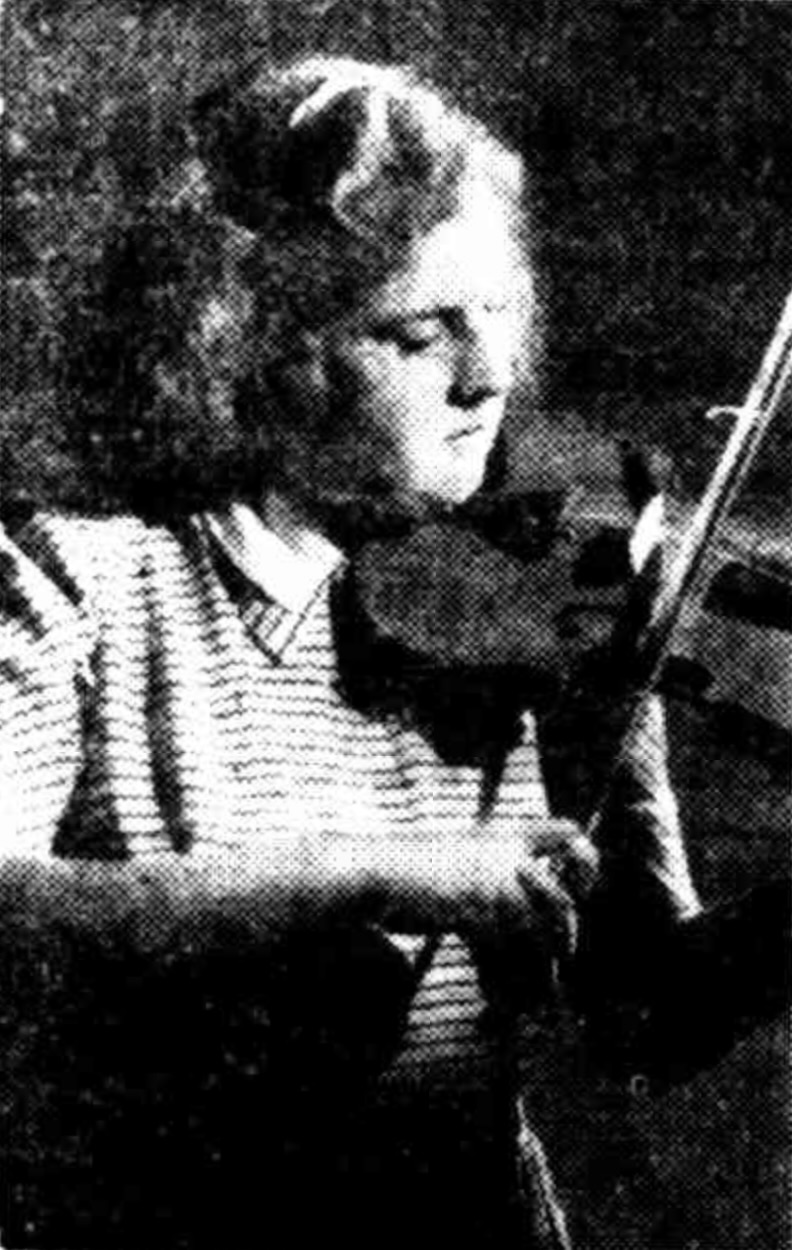
- Beryl Kimber in 1946
- Born: 3 June 1928; Perth, Western Australia
- Died: 25 November 2022 (aged 94); Sydney, New South Wales, Australia
- Occupations: Violinist, violin teacher
- Employer: Elder Conservatorium of Music

Beryl Kimber OBE (3 June 1928 – 25 November 2022) was an Australian violinist. In addition to her performing career, she taught violin at the Elder Conservatorium of Music for 34 years.

== Career ==
Kimber was born in Perth, Western Australia but grew up in Hobart, Tasmania. She studied piano with Miss S. Honey and in 1942 was awarded an AMusA by the Australian Music Examinations Board at age 14. She moved to Melbourne to study with Jeanne Gautier, a French violinist. In 1944, she was a finalist in the Conservatorium's concerto festival and performed the third movement of Max Bruch's Violin Concerto in G minor with the Melbourne Symphony Orchestra, conducted by Bernard Heinze. She later moved to Sydney where she was a pupil of Jascha Gopinko. In 1946, she won a British Council Scholarship at the ABC Young Performers Awards, which led to her studying at the Royal Academy of Music. From there, she won a full scholarship to continue her studies in Paris with Georges Enesco, a Romanian violinist.

Kimber debuted at Wigmore Hall in 1950 and in following years performed under conductors including Adrian Boult, Malcolm Sargent and John Barbirolli in England and Kirill Kondrashin in the Soviet Union. In Moscow in 1958, she won a Diploma of First Distinction at the inaugural International Tchaikovsky Competition, following which she studied for a year with Soviet violinist David Oistrakh.

Kimber returned to Australia and joined the Elder Conservatorium of Music in 1964 as a lecturer, rising to associate professor prior to her retirement in 1998. Her students included Adele Anthony, Luke Dollman and Niki Vasilakis.

== Awards and recognition ==
In the 1980 New Year Honours, Kimber was appointed an Officer of the British Empire (OBE) for service to music. She was presented with the Sir Bernard Heinze Memorial Award in 1990.

== Personal ==
In 1969, Kimber married pianist Clemens Theodor Leske (1923–2019).

Kimber died on 25 November 2022, at the age of 94. Their son, Clemens Leske, is a concert pianist and academic.
