= Maria Baltazzi =

American television producer

Maria Baltazzi is a Los Angeles-based television producer, known for her work in unscripted programming, particularly in adventure and documentary series. Her career has been marked by both critical acclaim and commercial success. Additionally, she is a wellbeing teacher, transformational travel designer, and author.

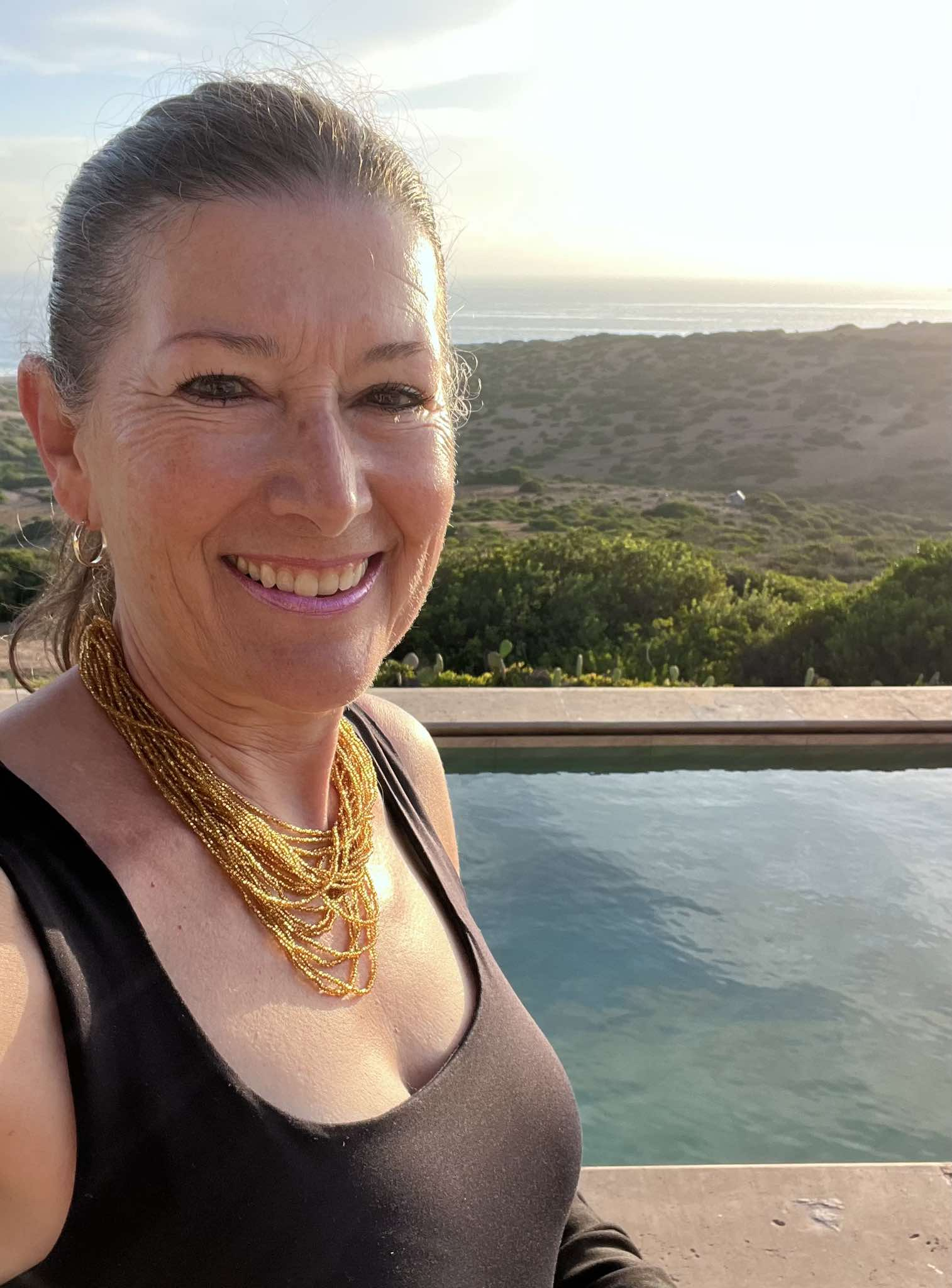
Maria Baltazzi, Morocco 2023

Take a Shot at Happiness: How to Write, Direct & Produce the Life You Want

In 2023, Baltazzi published Take a Shot at Happiness: How to Write, Direct & Produce the Life You Want. This book blends insights from science and spirituality to help readers achieve greater happiness. It offers practical steps and immersive activities that combine phone photography and journaling prompts aimed at fostering self-reflection and personal growth. Maria's approach to exploring happiness has been recognized for its creativity and innovation.

Book Awards

Maria Baltazzi's Take a Shot at Happiness has been recognized by several organizations:

- The Eric Hoffer Book Award: This is a prestigious annual literary prize that honors excellence in independent publishing. Established in 2007 to commemorate the American philosopher Eric Hoffer, the award recognizes outstanding books from small presses, academic publishers, micro presses, and self-published authors.
- #1 Amazon Bestseller in Creativity Self-Help: This is awarded to books that achieve high sales rankings within their category on Amazon. Rankings are determined by sales performance, which is updated hourly, reflecting recent purchases.
- Independent Press Award: This category recognizes books that motivate and empower readers to grow, overcome challenges, and improve their lives. "Take a Shot at Happiness" won in the Self help: Motivational Category, highlighting that you can create a healthier state of being and have fun doing it. Even when your world turns upside down, you can still be the writer, director, and producer of the life you want.
- National Indie Excellence Awards: Celebrating excellence in independent publishing, "Take a Shot at Happiness" won in the Wellbeing category and was a finalist in Personal Growth, highlighting its impact on mental and emotional well-being and personal development.
- New York City Big Book Award: This prestigious award recognizes exceptional literary works that inspire and uplift. Take a Shot at Happiness was the Winner in the Wellbeing category, celebrated for its empowering guidance on creating a fulfilling life through self-discovery and purpose.
- Best Book Awards: Celebrating excellence in literary achievement, this program honored Take a Shot at Happiness as the Winner in the Nonfiction: Creative category and a Finalist in Self-Help: General. The book was recognized for its unique and inspiring approach to personal growth and creative living.
- Nautilus Book Silver Award: This award honors books that promote spiritual growth, conscious living, and high-level awareness. "Take a Shot at Happiness" guides readers toward a more fulfilling life grounded in self-discovery.
- Best Holistic Life Magazine: Recognized as Best Personal Growth Book of the Year, Take a Shot at Happiness was celebrated for its transformative insights, guiding readers toward greater self-awareness, purpose, and a fulfilling life.
- Paris Book Festival: This festival celebrates literary works that resonate with creativity, originality, and cultural depth. Take a Shot at Happiness was honored as the Runner-Up in the How-To category for its inspiring approach to personal growth, offering readers a meaningful journey toward crafting a life filled with purpose and joy.
- Hollywood Book Festival: Wild Card (Anything Goes!) Honorable Mention. This festival typically recognizes creators in the media whose books have potential for film and TV adaptation.
- Royal Dragonfly Book Awards: Received Honorable Mentions in both the How-To/Prompting and Self-Help/Inspirational categories for promoting originality.

Personal Transformation and Philosophy

Baltazzi began her journey in the television industry as one of the original supervising producers of the Emmy Award-winning series Survivor on CBS. Her work during the show's early years helped shape its innovative storytelling and audience engagement, contributing to Survivor becoming a cultural phenomenon. In 2001, she received an Emmy Award for her work on the first two seasons of Survivor and was nominated for an Emmy for Eco-Challenge: Borneo.

After seven seasons with Survivor, Baltazzi moved on to developing and showrunning other television series. Witnessing the high-pressure environment of the entertainment world led her to question how people can achieve success while staying true to themselves and finding genuine happiness.

This question inspired Baltazzi to seek a more meaningful life, leading to her earning a Ph.D. in Conscious-Centered Living. She has also studied happiness, mindfulness, meditation, and positive psychology with teachers such as Tal Ben-Shahar, Jack Kornfield, Tara Brach, Rick Hanson, and Deepak Chopra.

The Happiness Explorer

Today, Baltazzi is known as the "Happiness Explorer." She combines her experience as a television producer, wellbeing teacher, world traveler, and transformational travel designer to help others on their journeys toward happiness. Her approach includes journaling and phone photography as tools for self-discovery, making the reader's happiness journey more personal and profound. Baltazzi is also committed to philanthropy. She has walked over 8,500 miles, participating in marathons on all seven continents to raise funds for various causes. Her other adventures include summiting Kilimanjaro twice, trekking to Everest Base Camp, leading treks in Africa, and walking the last 100 km of the Camino de Santiago several times.

Professional Affiliations

Baltazzi is a member of the Producers and Directors Guilds of America, The Explorers Club, and the Transformational Travel Council. Her enthusiasm, knowledge, and passion for human potential inspire others to pursue their dreams and find fulfillment. She believes that true success is found in self-discovery and the pursuit of authentic happiness.

== Early career ==
Maria began her television career shortly after graduating from San Diego State University with a Bachelor of Science in Marketing and a minor in Broadcast Management. She then attended the Art Center College of Design in Pasadena, where she and a classmate became the first two women to earn an MFA in Film. Years later, following professional and personal setbacks, Maria pursued studies in happiness and mindfulness, ultimately earning a Ph.D. in Conscious-Centered Living from the University of Sedona.

Her first job in television was at KCST-TV, an NBC affiliate in San Diego, where she worked in the Traffic Department, inputting commercials into the station's daily program log. She then spent nearly five years planning media campaigns for KRON-TV, an NBC affiliate in San Francisco. Maria later moved to Los Angeles, transitioning to production. She began as a TV show researcher and advanced to the roles of producer and director.

== Personal life ==
Maria has visited all seven continents twice and explored over seventy countries. She scaled Mount Kilimanjaro in November 2008 and October 2015, trekked to Everest Base Camp in May 2009, crossed the 15,000 ft Salkantay Pass to Machu Picchu in 2015, and climbed Mount Olympus in Greece in 2016. As an avid distance walker, Maria completed the New York City Marathon in November 2009, the Los Angeles Marathon in March 2010, the Athens Marathon in October 2010, the Great Wall Marathon in China in May 2011, the Solar Eclipse Marathon in Port Douglas, Australia, in November 2012, the Safaricom Marathon in Kenya in June 2013, the Rio Maratona Caixa in Rio de Janeiro in 2014, and the Last Marathon in Antarctica in 2015. She participates in marathons to raise funds for Lance Armstrong's Livestrong Foundation and Stand Up to Cancer.

== Awards and Accolades ==
- 2025 The Eric Hoffer Book Award Finalist: "Take a Shot at Happiness: How to Write, Direct & Produce the Life You Want” (Author)
- 2025 #1 Amazon Bestseller in Creativity Self-Help: "Take a Shot at Happiness: How to Write, Direct & Produce the Life You Want” (Author)
- 2025 Independent Press Award: Winner: Self help: Motivational “Take a Shot at Happiness: How to Write, Direct & Produce the Life You Want” (Author)
- 2024 National Indie Excellence Award: Wellbeing Winner and Personal Growth Finalist “Take a Shot at Happiness: How to Write, Direct & Produce the Life You Want” (Author)
- 2024 New York City Big Book Award: Wellbeing Winner “Take a Shot at Happiness: How to Write, Direct & Produce the Life You Want” (Author)
- 2024 Best Book Awards: Nonfiction:Creative Winner and Self-Help General Finalist “Take a Shot at Happiness: How to Write, Direct & Produce the Life You Want” (Author)
- 2024 Nautilus Silver Book Awards: Creativity & Innovation “Take a Shot at Happiness: How to Write, Direct & Produce the Life You Want” (Author)
- 2024 Best Holistic Life Magazine: Best Personal Growth Book of the Year “Take a Shot at Happiness: How to Write, Direct & Produce the Life You Want” (Author)
- 2024 Paris Book Festival: How-To Runner-Up “Take a Shot at Happiness: How to Write, Direct & Produce the Life You Want” (Author)
- 2024 Hollywood Book Festival: Wild Card (Anything Goes!) Honorable Mention “Take a Shot at Happiness: How to Write, Direct & Produce the Life You Want” (Author)
- 2024 Royal Dragonfly Book Awards: Honorable Mention on both How-To Prompting and Sel-help/Inspirational “Take a Shot at Happiness: How to Write, Direct & Produce the Life You Want” (Author)
- 2011 Movie Guide Awards Nominated: Faith and Freedom award for Television Program: "Sarah Palin's Alaska" (Executive Producer)
- 2009 Emmy Awards Nominated: Best Cinematography for Non-Fiction program: "Expedition Africa": Stanley & Livingstone" (Executive Producer)
- 2005 Emmy Awards Nominated: Outstanding Reality-Competition program: Survivor: Vanuatu & Survivor: Palau (judged as one show) (Supervising Producer, Survivor: Vanuatu)
- 2004 P.G.A. Awards Nominated: Television Producer of the Year Award in Reality/Game/Informational Series: Survivor (Supervising Producer)
- 2004 30th Annual People's Choice Awards Winner: Favorite Reality Based Television Program: Survivor (Supervising Producer)
- 2003 Emmy Awards 4 Nominations: Survivor: Thailand & Survivor: The Amazon (judged as one show) (Supervising Producer, Thailand)
- 2003 29th Annual People's Choice Awards Winner: Favorite Reality Based Television Program: Survivor: Thailand (Supervising Producer)
- 2003 TV Week's Annual Critics Poll Winner: Number 1 Reality Show & Number 7 Favorite Show: Survivor (Supervising Producer)
- 2002 Emmy Awards 4 Nominations: Survivor: Africa & Survivor: Marquesas (judged as one show) (Supervising Producer, Africa)
- 2002 28th Annual People's Choice Awards Winner: Favorite Reality Based Television Program: Survivor: The Australian Outback (Supervising Producer)
- 2001 Emmy Awards 6 Nominations, 2 Wins: Outstanding Non-Fiction Programming, Special Class Winner and Outstanding Sound Mixing for Non-Fiction Programming (single or multi-camera): Survivor: Borneo & Survivor: The Australian Outback (Supervising Producer)
- 2001 27th Annual People's Choice Awards Winner: Favorite Reality Based Television Program: Survivor (Supervising Producer)
- 2001 Family Television Awards given by the Family Friendly Programming Forum (3rd Annual) Winner: Reality/Alternative Programming: Survivor: The Australian Outback (Supervising Producer)
- 2001 Emmy Awards nominated: Eco-Challenge: Borneo (Producer)

== Show Credits (partial list) ==
- 2017 Earth Live; National Geographic Channel (Executive Producer)
- 2014 Women of the Bible; Lifetime (Executive Producer)
- 2013 Battle Ground: Rhino Wars; Animal Planet (Executive Producer)
- 2012 World's Toughest Truckers; Discovery US/Channel 5 UK (Executive Producer)
- 2011 One Man Army; Discovery (Executive Producer)
- 2010 Sarah Palin's Alaska; TLC (Executive Producer/Development Executive)
- 2009 Expedition Africa: Stanley and Livingstone"; History (Executive Producer/Development Executive)
- 2009 Greg Behrendt's Wake-Up Call; ABC (Supervising Producer)
- 2005 Bound for Glory; ESPN (Supervising Producer)
- 2000 - 2005 Survivor; CBS (Supervising Producer)
- 2003 Boarding House: North Shore; WB (Producer)
- 2002 American Fighter Pilot; CBS (Producer)
- 2001 Eco-Challenge: Borneo"; USA (Producer)
