= Jana Fleishman =

American talent agent

Jana Fleishman is an American talent agent and business executive. She is currently the head of communications and executive vice president of strategic marketing and business development at Roc Nation.

Fleishman began her career as an intern in the publicity department of Mercury Records. In 2009, she became the director of media and talent relations at entertainment company Roc Nation.

In 2012, USA Today included her on its list of the 10 Most Powerful Women in NY Fashion PR. In 2014, Bleacher Report named her one of the 25 Most Influential Women in Sports.
