= Jac Venza =

American television producer (1926–2024)

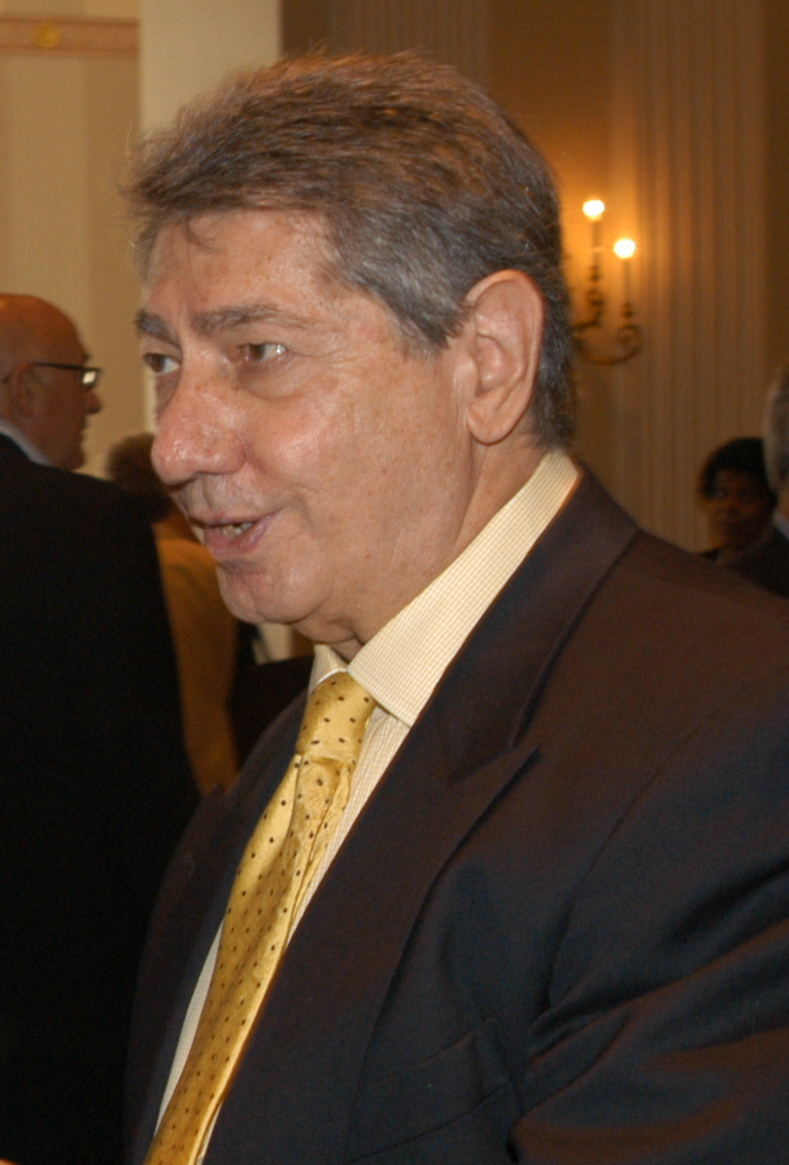
- Venza in 2004
- Born: December 23, 1926; Chicago, Illinois, U.S.
- Died: May 28, 2024 (aged 97); Lyme, Connecticut, U.S.
- Occupation: Television producer
- Years active: 1950s–2005
- Spouse: Daniel Routhier

Jac Venza (December 23, 1926 – May 28, 2024) was an American public television producer who was directly responsible for most of the theatre and music programs that have been seen on PBS from its creation in 1970. From the early 1960s until his retirement in 2005, Venza brought such programs as NET Playhouse, Live from Lincoln Center, American Playhouse, American Masters, and Great Performances to millions of viewers. He won a Personal Peabody Award in 1998.

== Life and career ==
Jac Venza was born in Chicago, Illinois, on December 23, 1926. He began his career on CBS in the 1950s, where he began to notice the scarcity of programming devoted to the fine arts on television. It was his dream to bring more of it to the home screen on a regular basis, but he did not receive a full opportunity to do so until the creation of National Educational Television, where it soon became possible, thanks largely to Venza, to see great dramatic literature regularly performed by some of the world's most renowned actors. A then-unknown Dustin Hoffman made his first major television appearance in a play—Ronald Ribman's The Journey of the Fifth Horse—on NET in 1966. NET Playhouse was perhaps the first television anthology to present commercial-free, full-length productions (rather than one-hour or ninety-minute adaptations) of theatrical classics such as Arthur Miller's adaptation of Ibsen's An Enemy of the People. When NET became PBS, Venza quickly launched Great Performances, which is still running today.

Upon his retirement from PBS, the Corporation for Public Broadcasting awarded Venza the Ralph Lowell medal. He held the record for the most Emmy nominations for an individual—fifty-seven—until 2010.

Venza died in Lyme, Connecticut on May 28, 2024, at the age of 97. He was married to Daniel Routhier.
