= Alvin Cooperman =

American television producer

Alvin Cooperman (July 24, 1923 – August 11, 2006) was a television producer and entertainment executive.

== Biography ==
Born in Brooklyn, Cooperman began his work as an office boy at the age of 16 for the Shubert Organization. In 1951 he got a job with NBC as a production manager, for which network he would produce several successful television series in the 1960s, including Shirley Temple's Fairy Tales and The Untouchables. He is also known as the producer of the Family Album, U.S.A. educational television series and the 1986 TV movie My Two Loves.
