= David Wild =

American writer

- Born: December 16, 1961 (age 64); U.S.
- Education: Cornell University
- Occupations: Writer; critic

David Wild (born December 16, 1961) is an American writer and critic in the music and television industries and a contributing editor at Rolling Stone. His published books include Friends: The Official Companion (1995), Seinfeld: The Totally Unauthorized Tribute (1998), Friends 'Til the End: The Official Celebration of All Ten Years (2004).

Wild hosted the television series Musicians, which aired on Bravo! in 2001. His writing credits for television include over two dozen series and specials. In 2001, he was nominated for an Emmy for his work on America: A Tribute to Heroes. He has written for the Grammy Awards since 2001 and became a producer for the show in 2016.

Wild is an alumnus of Cornell University in Ithaca, New York. He was a frequent guest on The Adam Carolla Show, usually bringing a musical guest or a musical selection to feature on the show. In early 2022, the Naked Lunch podcast was announced, featuring Phil Rosenthal and Wild. Brad Paisley, a longtime friend of Wild's, recorded the theme song for the show, which debuted officially on May 12, 2022 with Paisley being the first guest. Rosenthal and Wild have welcomed a wide range of guests including Graham Nash, Susanna Hoffs, Keanu Reeves with his band Dogstar, Peter Frampton, Jimmy Kimmel.

== Books ==
- David Wild. (1996). Friends: the Book. New York: Boxtree. ISBN 0-75220-18-4-0.
- David Wild. (1998). Seinfeld: The Totally Unauthorized Tribute (Not That There's Anything Wrong with That). New York: Three Rivers Press. ISBN 0-60980-31-1-5.
- David Wild. (2000). The Showrunners: A Season Inside the Billion-Dollar, Death-Defying, Madcap World of Television's Real Stars. New York: Harper Perennial. ISBN 0-06093-20-2-3.
- David Wild. (2004). Friends 'Til the End: The Official Celebration of All Ten Years. New York: Time Inc. ISBN 1-93227-31-9-0.
- David Wild. (2007). And the Grammy Goes To...: The Official Story of Music's Most Coveted Award. New York: State Street Press. ISBN 978-0-68149-73-9-9.
- David Wild. (2009). He Is . . . I Say: How I Learned to Stop Worrying and Love Neil Diamond. New York: Da Capo Press. ISBN 978-0-30681-83-5-6.
- Brad Paisley and David Wild. (2012). Diary of a Player: How My Musical Heroes Made a Guitar Man Out of Me. Brentwood, Tennessee: Howard Books. ISBN 978-1-45167-43-5-4.
