= John Goberman =

20th-century American television and concert producer

- Born: 17 January 1941 (age 85); New York City, NY, United States
- Education: Columbia College
- Occupations: Cellist; television and concert producer
- Known for: Live and cinematic production and broadcast of operatic and symphonic performances
- Notable work: Live from Lincoln Center
- Parents: Max Goberman (father); Jean Schneider (mother)
- Awards: Emmy Awards x13; Peabody Awards x3; Television Critics Circle Award for Achievement in Music; Honorary Doctorate, University of Bridgeport

John Goberman (born January 17, 1941) is an American television and concert producer, best known as the creator and founding executive producer of Live from Lincoln Center, the long-running PBS series that presented live opera, ballet, theater, and symphonic performances from Lincoln Center for the Performing Arts.

== Early life and career ==
Goberman was born in New York City to conductor Max Goberman and cellist Jean Schneider Goberman. He trained as a cellist and studied Russian at Columbia College. A 1969 New Yorker “Talk of the Town” article described him as “a young cellist” who created and organized a 12-hour “Chamber Music Vigil” at Lincoln Center for the Vietnam Moratorium. He later performed with the New York City Opera, the Metropolitan Opera, the American Symphony Orchestra, and the Marlboro Festival.

== Production career ==
Following his performing career, Goberman joined the New York City Opera’s administration, where he developed the concept of televising live performances—a project that later evolved into Live from Lincoln Center.

=== Live from Lincoln Center ===
Goberman launched Live from Lincoln Center on PBS in 1976. The series broadcast more than 200 live performances featuring Lincoln Center’s resident companies, including the New York Philharmonic, New York City Ballet, American Ballet Theatre, the Chamber Music Society, and Jazz at Lincoln Center. He introduced production methods that enabled televised concerts, operas, and ballets to be recorded live without interrupting the audience or performers. Goberman also produced the companion series Backstage at Lincoln Center, which profiled artists such as Yo-Yo Ma and Luciano Pavarotti. He served as executive producer of Live from Lincoln Center until 2012.

=== Symphonic cinema ===
In addition to his television work, Goberman developed a format he called A Symphonic Night at the Movies, in which orchestras perform film scores live in synchronization with projected films. A 1992 Washington Post article described one of the programs as presenting soundtrack excerpts from films such as The Adventures of Robin Hood, Madame Bovary, North by Northwest, Citizen Kane, Gone with the Wind, and Ben-Hur, accompanied by live orchestral performance. The article also noted that Goberman emphasized the importance of visual presentation in classical programming, citing his work with the National Symphony Orchestra at Wolf Trap, where film sequences were projected while the orchestra performed the accompanying score.

=== Other work ===
Goberman co-produced the theatrical documentary Distant Harmony: Pavarotti in China (1988) and produced The White House: In Tune with History (2000) for PBS. He also created films for the Metropolitan Museum of Art, the Van Cliburn International Piano Competition, and other cultural organizations.

== Honors ==
Goberman has received 13 Emmy Awards, three Peabody Awards, eight Sigma Alpha Iota awards, and the first Television Critics Association Award for Achievement in Music. He was an artist-in-residence at the State University of New York and received an honorary doctorate from the University of Bridgeport. Symphony magazine cited him among“ the fifty most important people who have made a difference in the history of American music.” As of 2025, Goberman worked in New York City as head of PGM Productions, Inc.
