= Live from Lincoln Center =

Television series

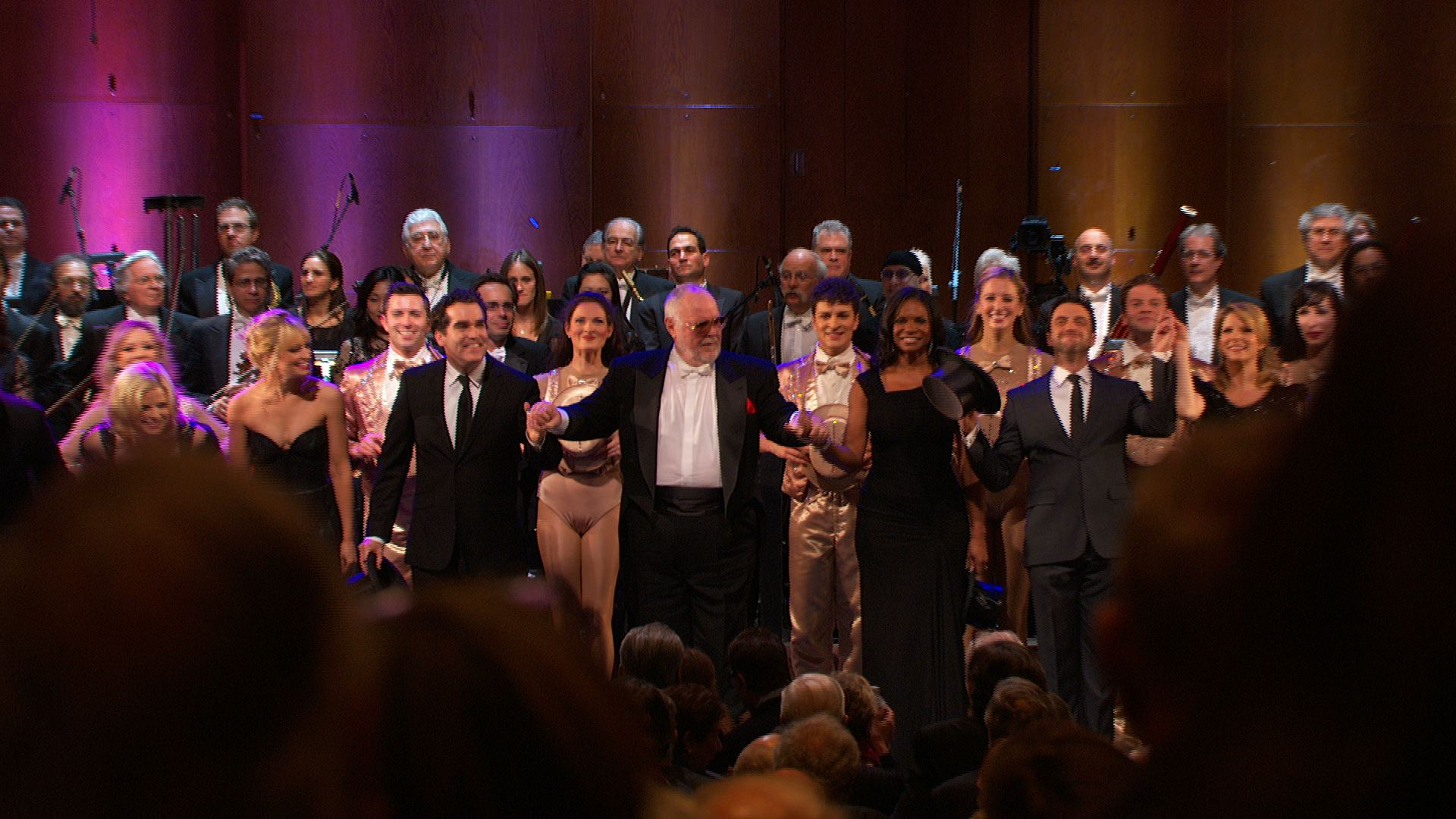
- Cast of "One Singular Sensation" taking their final bows
- Genre: Performing arts television
- Created by: John Goberman
- Directed by: Habib Azar; Kirk Browning; Dana Calderwood; Alex Coletti; Matthew Diamond; Brad Fuss; Annette Jolles; Lonny Price; Alan Skog; Glenn Weiss; Andrew Carl Wilk
- Presented by: Audra McDonald (2013–present)
- Country of origin: United States
- No. of seasons: 43
- No. of episodes: 251

Production
- Executive producer: Andrew Carl Wilk
- Production locations: Lincoln Center for the Performing Arts and elsewhere
- Production company: Lincoln Center for the Performing Arts

Original release
- Release: January 30, 1976 – 2019

Live from Lincoln Center was a seventeen-time Emmy Award-winning series that broadcast notable performances from the Lincoln Center in New York City on PBS starting 1976. The program aired between six and nine times per season. Episodes of Live from Lincoln Center featured Lincoln Center's resident artistic organizations, most notably the New York Philharmonic. Funding for the series was made possible by major grants from the Robert Wood Johnson 1962 Charitable Trust, Thomas H. Lee and Ann Tenenbaum, the Robert and Renee Belfer Family Foundation, the MetLife Foundation, Mercedes T. Bass, and the National Endowment for the Arts. Production of new episodes has been suspended indefinitely since 2019.

== History ==
Live from Lincoln Center premiered on PBS on January 30, 1976, as part of the Great Performances family of performing arts programs. Since its premiere, the series has presented performances by the world's greatest performing artists. Some of its most notable regular performers include Audra McDonald (the program's official host), Plácido Domingo, Luciano Pavarotti, Leonard Bernstein, Itzhak Perlman, George Balanchine, Isaac Stern, Nathan Lane, James Galway, Billy Porter, Zubin Mehta, James Naughton, Kurt Masur, Kristin Chenoweth, Jason Isbell, Beverly Sills, Yo-Yo Ma, Renée Fleming, Emma Thompson, Joan Sutherland, Josh Groban, Mikhail Baryshnikov, Patina Miller, the New York City Ballet, the Mark Morris Dance Group, the American Ballet Theatre, the Alvin Ailey American Dance Theater, the New York Philharmonic, and the New York City Opera.

Martin Bookspan served as the program announcer from the premiere of Live from Lincoln Center until his retirement in 2006, at which point Fred Child took over. On-camera hosts throughout the broadcast's history have included Dick Cavett, Hugh Downs, Sam Waterston, Garrick Utley, Patrick Watson, and Beverly Sills. Most recently, the host position has been filled by Alan Alda, Alec Baldwin, Lesley Stahl, and currently, Audra McDonald.

The show was originally developed in the mid-1970s by John Goberman, who served as executive producer from 1976 until 2011. In 2012, current Executive Producer Andrew Carl Wilk took over. Through 2012, the show was, in fact, live (or delayed slightly to accommodate PBS scheduling).

Through Goberman and Wilk's leadership, Live from Lincoln Center has gone on to win 17 Emmy Awards, 2 George Foster Peabody Awards, and several other accolades over its time on PBS. The current team of directors for the program is made up of Habib Azar, Dana Calderwood, Alex Coletti, Matthew Diamond, Brad Fuss, Annette Jolles, Lonny Price, Alan Skog, Glenn Weiss, and Andrew Carl Wilk. Kirk Browning is credited as the longest-running director of the series, contributing to the production of 185 episodes, and winning two Primetime Emmys as well as two Daytime Emmys. The show's full-time production team, led by Wilk, is composed of Douglas Chang (Series Producer), Kristy Geslain (Producer, Lincoln Center Media Productions), Danielle Schiffman (Director, Business and Legal Affairs), Daisy Placeres (Line Producer), Gillian Campbell (Manager, Rights and Media), and Nick Palm (Post-Production Supervisor; Lead Editor).

== Awards ==
Season	Performance(s)	Nomination(s)	Result(s)
1975–76	New York Philharmonic, Andre Previn/Van Cliburn, January 30, 1976	Emmy Award for Outstanding Achievement in Creative Technical Crafts (Mark Schubin & John Leay)	Nominated
1975–76	New York Philharmonic, Andre Previn/Van Cliburn, January 30, 1976	Emmy Award for Outstanding Classical Program in the Performing Arts	Won
1975–76	New York Philharmonic, Andre Previn/Van Cliburn, January 30, 1976	Primetime Emmy Award for Outstanding Achievement in Tape Sound Mixing (John E. Pfeiffer)	Nominated
1975–76	New York City Opera, "The Barber of Seville", November 3, 1976	Emmy Award for Outstanding Costume Design (Jan Skalicky)	Won
1976–77	New York Philharmonic, Rafael Kubelick/Claudio Arrau, November 20, 1976	Primetime Emmy Award for Outstanding Achievement in Music Direction (Rafael Kubelick)	Nominated
1976–77	American Ballet Theatre, "Swan Lake", June 2, 1977	Primetime Emmy Award for Outstanding Achievement in Choreography (David Blair)	Nominated
1976–77	Great Performances: "Arthur Rubinstein at 90" January 26, 1977	Television Critics Circle Award: Achievement in Music	Won
1977–78	American Ballet Theatre, "Giselle", June 2, 1977	Primetime Emmy Award for Outstanding Classical Program in the Performing Arts	Won
1977–78	New York Philharmonic, Mehta/Verrett, September 24, 1978	Primetime Emmy Award for Outstanding Music Direction (Zubin Mehta)	Nominated
1977–78	New York City Ballet, "Coppelia", January 31, 1978	Primetime Emmy Award for Outstanding Achievement in Choreography (George Balanchine & Alexandra Danilova)	Nominated
1977–78	New York City Ballet, "Coppelia", January 31, 1978	Emmy Award for Outstanding Achievement in Creative Technical Crafts (Mark Schubin)	Nominated
1977–78	Recital at the Metropolitan Opera House, Luciano Pavarotti, February 12, 1978	Daytime Emmy Award for Special Classification of Outstanding Program Achievement	Won
1977–78	American Ballet Theatre, "Evening of Repertory", May 17, 1978	Primetime Emmy Award for Outstanding Classical Program in the Performing Arts	Nominated
1978–79	Recital at Avery Fisher Hall, Sutherland/Pavarotti, January 22, 1979	Primetime Emmy Award for Outstanding Classical Program in the Performing Arts	Nominated
1978–79	American Ballet Theatre, "The Sleeping Beauty", May 2, 1979	Primetime Emmy Award for Outstanding Classical Program in the Performing Arts	Nominated
1979–80	New York Philharmonic, Luciano Pavarotti, January 14, 1980	Emmy Award for Outstanding Achievement in Creative Technical Craft; "Technical Design of Stereo Simulcast" (Mark Schubin)	Won
1980–81	"Isaac Stern's 60th Birthday Celebration", Stern/Perlman/Zukerman, Avery Fisher Hall, September 24, 1980	Emmy Award for Outstanding Classical Program in the Performing Arts	Nominated
1980–81	"Isaac Stern's 60th Birthday Celebration", Stern/Perlman/Zukerman, Avery Fisher Hall, September 24, 1980	Grammy Award for Best Classical Performance – Instrumental Soloist or Soloists (with Orchestra)	Won
1980–81	"Beverly! Her Farewell Performance", New York State Theater, January 5, 1981	Emmy Award for Outstanding Classical Program in the Performing Arts	Nominated
1980–81	"Sutherland/Horne/Pavarotti" Recorded from the Trio Concert Telecast, Avery Fisher Hall, March 23, 1981	Grammy Award for Best Classical Vocal Soloist Performance	Won
1980–81	"Sutherland/Horne/Pavarotti" Recorded from the Trio Concert Telecast, Avery Fisher Hall, March 23, 1981	Emmy Award for Outstanding Classical Program in the Performing Arts	Nominated
1980–81	"Sutherland/Horne/Pavarotti" Recorded from the Trio Concert Telecast, Avery Fisher Hall, March 23, 1981	Emmy Award for Outstanding Achievement in Creative Technical Crafts (Mark Schubin)	Nominated
1981–82	"An Evening with Danny Kaye and the New York Philharmonic", Avery Fisher Hall, September 23, 1981	George Foster Peabody Personal Award to Danny Kaye	Won
1981–82	"An Evening with Danny Kaye and the New York Philharmonic", Avery Fisher Hall, September 23, 1981	Emmy Award for Outstanding Classical Program in the Performing Arts	Nominated
1981–82	"An Evening with Danny Kaye and the New York Philharmonic", Avery Fisher Hall, September 23, 1981	Primetime Emmy Award for Outstanding Directing in a Variety or a Music Program (Robert Scheerer)	Nominated
1981–82	Itzhak Perlman and the New York Philharmonic, Avery Fisher Hall, February 10, 1982	Emmy Award for Outstanding Classical Program in the Performing Arts	Nominated
1982–83	New York Philharmonic with Zubin Mehta & Leontyne Price, September 15, 1982	Primetime Emmy Award for Outstanding Individual Performance in a Variety or Music Program (Leontyne Price)	Won
1983–84	New York City Ballet, "Tribute to George Balanchine", October 10, 1983	Emmy Award for Outstanding Classical Program in the Performing Arts	Nominated
1983–84	New York Philharmonic, James Galway, Zubin Mehta, February 29, 1984	Emmy Award for Outstanding Individual Achievement in a Classical/Music/Dance Program (Emile Ardolino)	Nominated
1983–84	"Marilyn Horne's Great American Songbook", Avery Fisher Hall, December 23, 1983	Emmy Award for Outstanding Video Tape Editing for a Limited Series or a Special (Matty Powers & Frank C. Cernese)	Nominated
1983–84	"Marilyn Horne's Great American Songbook", Avery Fisher Hall, December 23, 1983	Emmy Award for Outstanding Classical Program in the Performing Arts	Nominated
1983–84	"Marilyn Horne's Great American Songbook", Avery Fisher Hall, December 23, 1983	Primetime Emmy Award for Outstanding Music Direction (Leonard Slatkin; Jonathan Tunick; William D. Brohn; Glenn Osser; Paul Chiara; Jack Gale)	Nominated
1983–84	"Marilyn Horne's Great American Songbook", Avery Fisher Hall, December 23, 1983	Sigma Alpha Iota Award ('84) for Outstanding Television Series (Live from Lincoln Center"	Won
1985–86	Live From Lincoln Center, Chamber Music Society: Worth/Gutierrez, January 12, 1986	Daytime Emmy Award for Special Class Program Area	Won
1985–86	Aaron Copland's 85th Birthday with the New York Philharmonic & Zubin Mehta, November 14, 1985	Sigma Alpha Iota Award for Outstanding Television Series	Won
1985–86	Aaron Copland's 85th Birthday with the New York Philharmonic & Zubin Mehta, November 14, 1985	Emmy Award for Outstanding Classical Program in the Performing Arts	Nominated
1985–86	New York Philharmonic Celebration with Zubin Mehta, Stern/Perlman/Caballe, April 29, 1986	Emmy Award for Outstanding Classical Program in the Performing Arts	Nominated
1985–86	"Juilliard at 80" featuring Kelly McGillis, John Rubinstein, May 3, 1985	Monitor Award for Best Achievement in Broadcast Entertainment	Won
1985–86	"Juilliard at 80" featuring Kelly McGillis, John Rubinstein, May 3, 1985	Monitor Award for Best Camera	Won
1985–86	"Juilliard at 80" featuring Kelly McGillis, John Rubinstein, May 3, 1985	Monitor Award for Best Director	Won
1985–86	"Juilliard at 80" featuring Kelly McGillis, John Rubinstein, May 3, 1985	George Foster Peabody Broadcasting Award for Significant and Meritorious Achievement (Live From Lincoln Center)	Won
1985–86	"An Evening with Plácido Domingo" Avery Fisher Hall, February 18, 1987	International Film and Television Festival of New York Silver Award	Won
1987–88	New York Philharmonic, New Year's Eve Celebration, Zubin Mehta/Kathleen Battle/The Boys' Choir of Harlem	Emmy Award for Outstanding Classical Program in the Performing Arts	Nominated
1987–88	American Ballet Theatre, Prokofiev, "Romeo & Juliet", May 7, 1988	Emmy Award for Outstanding Classical Program in the Performing Arts	Nominated
1987–88	American Ballet Theatre, Prokofiev, "Romeo & Juliet", May 7, 1988	International Film and Television Festival of New York Silver Award	Won
1987–88	Ray Charles in Concert with the New York City Ballet, May 12, 1989	Emmy Award for Outstanding Classical Program in the Performing Arts	Nominated
1989–90	A Classical Jazz Christmas with Wynton Marsalis, December 22, 1989	Emmy Award for Outstanding Classical Program in the Performing Arts	Nominated
1989–90	Mostly Mozart with Itzhak Perlman, July 12, 1989	Emmy Award for Outstanding Classical Program in the Performing Arts	Nominated
1989–90	Mostly Mozart with Itzhak Perlman, July 12, 1989	Sigma Alpha Iota Award for Outstanding Single Program	Won
1989–90	Mostly Mozart with Itzhak Perlman, July 12, 1989	Sigma Alpha Iota Award for Outstanding Television Series (Live from Lincoln Center)	Won
1990–91	"Yo-Yo Ma in Concert" October 14, 1990	Daytime Emmy Award for Special Class Program Area	Won
1990–91	New York City Opera, "A Little Night Music", November 7, 1990	Emmy Award for Outstanding Classical Program in the Performing Arts	Nominated
1990–91	New York City Opera, "A Little Night Music", November 7, 1990	Sigma Alpha Iota Award for Outstanding Television Series (Live from Lincoln Center)	Won
1990–91	Great Performers at Lincoln Center, "Pavarotti Plus!" January 30, 1991	Emmy Award for Outstanding Classical Program in the Performing Arts	Nominated
1990–91	Mozart Bicentennial Birthday Serenade, January 27, 1991	Emmy Award for Outstanding Special Class Program	Nominated
1991–92	The 100th Telecast, "Pavarotti Plus!" February 24, 1992	Emmy Award for Outstanding Classical Program in the Performing Arts	Nominated
1993–94	Live from Lincoln Center Season 18	Sigma Alpha Iota Award for Outstanding Television Music Series	Won
1994–95	New York City Opera, "La Traviata" New York State Theater, March 28, 1995	Primetime Emmy Award for Outstanding Cultural Program	Won
1994–95	New York City Opera, "La Traviata" New York State Theater, March 28, 1995	Sigma Alpha Iota Award for Outstanding Television Music Series	Won
1996–97	Mostly Mozart 30th Anniversary Opening Night Concert with Itzhak Perlman and Pinchas Zukerman, July 10, 1996	Emmy Award for Outstanding Classical Music-Dance Program	Nominated
1996–97	"A Celebration of the American Musical" Avery Fisher Hall, April 7, 1997	Emmy Award for Outstanding Classical Music-Dance Program	Nominated
1996–97	New York City Opera, Puccini's "La Bohème" New York State Theater, March 26, 1997	Emmy Award for Outstanding Classical Music-Dance Program	Won
1996–97	New York City Opera, Puccini's "La Bohème" New York State Theater, March 26, 1997	Primetime Emmy Award for Outstanding Technical Direction, Camerawork, Video Control for a Limited Series, Movie, or Special	Nominated
1997–98	Live from Lincoln Center Chamber Music Society: "A Celebration of Johannes Brahms with Jessye Norman and Pinchas Zukerman", May 4, 1997	Daytime Emmy: Special Class Program	Nominated
1998–99	New York Philharmonic + Jazz at Lincoln Center: "Ellington at 100", April 7, 1999	Emmy Award for Outstanding Classical Music-Dance Program	Nominated
1998–99	New York City Ballet: Tchaikovsky's "Swan Lake", May 5, 1999	Emmy Award for Outstanding Classical Music-Dance Program	Nominated
1999–2000	Mostly Mozart Festival Opening Night: James Galway and Frederica von Stade, July 28, 1999	Emmy Award for Outstanding Classical Music-Dance Program	Nominated
1999–2000	Live from Lincoln Center: "Perlman at the Penthouse" Itzhak Perlman and the Orpheus Chamber Orchestra, January 5, 2000	Emmy Award for Outstanding Classical Music-Dance Program	Nominated
2000–01	The Chamber Music Society of Lincoln Center: "An Evening of Beethoven" October 14, 2001	Emmy Award for Outstanding Special Class Program	Nominated
2001–02	The Gershwins' "Porgy and Bess" with the New York City Opera, March 20, 2002	Emmy Award for Outstanding Classical Music-Dance Program	Nominated
2001–02	Mostly Mozart Festival 2001, "Mozart's Requiem", September 20, 2002	Emmy Award for Outstanding Classical Music-Dance Program	Nominated
2002–03	Lincoln Center Theater "Contact", September 1, 2002	Emmy Award for Outstanding Classical Music-Dance Program	Won
2002–03	New York Philharmonic All-Gershwin New Year's Eve Concert, December 31, 2002	Emmy Award for Outstanding Classical Music-Dance Program	Nominated
2002–03	Live from Lincoln Center "Perlman at the Penthouse", January 22, 2003	Emmy Award for Outstanding Classical Music-Dance Program	Nominated
2003–04	Chamber Music Society of Lincoln Center: The Complete Brandenburg Concertos, December 14, 2003	Emmy Award for Outstanding Classical Music-Dance Program	Won
2004–05	Live from Lincoln Center: American Songbook: Stephen Sondheim's PASSION, March 31, 2005	Emmy Award for Outstanding Special Class Program	Won
2004–05	Live from Lincoln Center: "Vivaldi, Haydn, & Yo-Yo Ma" April 29, 2004	Emmy Award for Outstanding Special Class Program	Nominated
2004–05	New York City Ballet: Lincoln Center Celebrates Balanchine 100, May 5, 2004	Emmy Award for Outstanding Special Class Program	Won
2004–05	Live from Lincoln Center: Jazz at Lincoln Center Grand Opening of Frederick P. Rose Hall – "One Family of Jazz", October 18, 2004	Emmy Award for Outstanding Special Class Program	Nominated
2005–06	Jazz at Lincoln Center "Higher Ground Hurricane Relief Benefit" September 17, 2005	Emmy Award for Outstanding Directorial Achievement in Musical Variety (Alan Skog)	Nominated
2006–07	A Lincoln Center Special: "30 Years of Live from Lincoln Center", May 25, 2006	Emmy Award for Outstanding Special Class Program	Nominated
2007–08	New York City Opera, "Madam Butterfly" March 20, 2008	Emmy Award for Outstanding Classical Music-Dance Program	Won
2010–11	Live from Lincoln Center "Baroque Holiday with the Chamber Music Society of Lincoln Center" December 13, 2010	Daytime Emmy: Outstanding Special Class Directing (Alan Skog)	Nominated
2011–12	Live from Lincoln Center, New York City Ballet, George Balanchine's "The Nutcracker" December 14, 2011	Primetime Emmy Award for Outstanding Director for a Variety Special(Alan Skog)	Nominated
2012–13	Live from Lincoln Center, New York Philharmonic: Rodgers & Hammerstein's Carousel, April 26, 2013	Primetime Emmy Award for Outstanding Special Class Program	Nominated
2012–13	Live from Lincoln Center, New York Philharmonic: Rodgers & Hammerstein's Carousel, April 26, 2013	Primetime Emmy Award for Outstanding Music Direction (Rob Fisher)	Nominated
2012–13	Live from Lincoln Center, New York Philharmonic: Rodgers & Hammerstein's Carousel, April 26, 2013	Primetime Emmy Award for Outstanding Choreography (Warren Carlyle)	Nominated
2014–15	"Sweeney Todd: The Demon Barber of Fleet Street" In Concert with the New York Philharmonic, September 26, 2014	Emmy Award for Outstanding Special Class Program	Won
2014–15	"Sweeney Todd: The Demon Barber of Fleet Street" In Concert with the New York Philharmonic, September 26, 2014	Primetime Emmy Award for Outstanding Lead Actress in a Limited Series or Movie (Emma Thompson)	Nominated
2014–15	"Sweeney Todd: The Demon Barber of Fleet Street" In Concert with the New York Philharmonic, September 26, 2014	Primetime Emmy Award for Outstanding Music Direction (Alan Gilbert)	Nominated
2015–16	Lincoln Center Festival, "Danny Elfman's Music from the Films of Tim Burton", October 30, 2015	Primetime Emmy Award for Outstanding Music Direction (Danny Elfman)	Won
2015–16	Lincoln Center Festival, "Danny Elfman's Music from the Films of Tim Burton", October 30, 2015	Primetime Emmy Award for Outstanding Sound Mixing for a Variety Series or Special (Paul Bevan, Production Mixer; Ken Hahn, Re-Recording Mixer; Skip Kent, Production Mixer; Lawrence Rock, Music Mixer)	Won
2015–16	New York Philharmonic, "Sinatra: Voice for a Century", December 18, 2015	Primetime Emmy Award for Outstanding Music Direction (Alan Gilbert)	Nominated
2016–17	Joshua Bell: Seasons of Cuba (Live from Lincoln Center)	Primetime Emmy Award for Outstanding Music Direction (David Lai)	Nominated

== Notable broadcasts ==
- American Ballet Theatre: Swan Lake (Jun. 30, 1976)
- New York City Opera: The Barber of Seville (Nov. 3, 1976)
- Stern, Perlman & Zukerman: Isaac Stern's 60th Birthday Celebration (Sep. 9, 1980)
- Beverly! Her Farewell Performance, An Evening with Danny Kaye (Jan. 5, 1981)
- New York City Ballet: A Tribute to George Balanchine (Oct. 10, 1983)
- Marilyn Horne's Great American Songbook (Dec. 23, 1983)
- Aaron Copland's 85th Birthday with the N.Y. Philharmonic & Zubin Mehta (Nov. 14, 1985)
- Ray Charles in Concert, A Classical Jazz Christmas with Wynton Marsalis (Dec. 22, 1989)
- New York Philharmonic: Zubin Mehta with Daniel Barenboim (Oct. 3, 1990)
- Yo-Yo Ma in Concert, A Little Night Music (Oct. 14, 1990)
- Mozart Bicentennial Birthday Serenade (Jan. 27, 1991)
- New York Philharmonic 150th Anniversary (Sep. 7, 1992)
- New York City Opera: La traviata (Mar. 28, 1995)
- A Celebration of the American Musical (Apr. 7, 1997)
- New York Philharmonic & Jazz at Lincoln Center: Ellington at 100 (Apr. 7, 1999)
- New York City Ballet: Tchaikovsky's Swan Lake (May 5, 1999)
- The Gershwins' Porgy and Bess with the New York City Opera (May 2, 2002)
- Lincoln Center Theater Contact (Sep. 1, 2002)
- Jazz at L.C. Grand Opening of Frederick P. Rose Hall “One Family of Jazz”, (Oct. 18, 2004)
- Jazz at Lincoln Center: “Higher Ground Hurricane Relief Benefit” (Sep. 17, 2005)
- A Lincoln Center Special: “30 Years of Live from Lincoln Center” (May 25, 2006)
- New York City Ballet: Romeo + Juliet (May 1, 2007)
- New York City Opera, Madam Butterfly (Mar. 20, 2008)
- Joshua Bell with Friends @ The Penthouse (Jun. 13, 2010)
- Wynton at 50 (Oct. 13, 2011)
- New York Philharmonic: Bernstein and Gershwin New Year's Eve (Dec. 31, 2011)
- Renée Fleming @ The Penthouse (Apr. 6, 2012)
- One Singular Sensation! Celebrating Marvin Hamlisch (Dec. 31, 2012)
- Rodgers & Hammerstein's Carousel (Apr. 26, 2013)
- Audra McDonald in Concert: Go Back Home (May 24, 2013)
- New York Philharmonic Gala with Yo-Yo Ma (Dec. 31, 2013)
- Richard Tucker at 100: An Opera Celebration (Jan. 10, 2014)
- Patina Miller in Concert (Mar. 28, 2014)
- James Naughton: The Songs of Randy Newman (Apr. 4, 2014)
- Jason Isbell: Moving Forward (Apr. 11, 2014)
- The Nance at the Lyceum Theatre (Oct. 10, 2014)
- Richard Tucker Opera Gala: A New Century (Jan. 23, 2015)
- Billy Porter: Broadway & Soul (Apr. 3, 2015)
- Norm Lewis: Who Am I? (Apr. 10, 2015)
- Curtain Up: The School of American Ballet Workshop Performances (Aug. 7, 2015)
- New York Philharmonic Opening Gala with Lang Lang (Sep. 24, 2015)
- Kern & Hammerstein's Show Boat with The New York Philharmonic (Oct. 16, 2015)
- Danny Elfman's Music from the Films of Tim Burton (Oct. 30, 2015)
- James Lapine: Act One (Nov. 13, 2015)
- Sinatra: Voice for a Century (Dec. 18, 2015)
- New York Philharmonic New Year's Eve: La Vie Parisienne (Dec. 31, 2015)
- 50 Years of Mostly Mozart (Feb. 3, 2016)
- From Bocelli to Barton: The Richard Tucker Opera Gala (Feb. 5, 2016)
- Lincoln Center At the Movies presents: Alvin Ailey American Dance Theater (Nov. 3, 2016)
- Lang Lang's New York Rhapsody (Nov. 25, 2016)
- Joshua Bell: Seasons of Cuba (Dec. 16, 2016)
- New York Philharmonic's New Year's Eve 2016: Enchanted Evening (Dec. 31, 2016)
- Falsettos (Oct. 27, 2017)

== Home media ==
Traditionally, Live from Lincoln Center has never been made available on home video due to rights issues. A notable exception was a series of selected classic episodes licensed to Paramount Home Video and released under the "Lincoln Center for the Performing Arts Presents" banner through its Bel Canto Video division in the late '80s. Kultur International Films also released a few episodes on videocassette without any branding.

== Reception ==
Emily Bruno of Broadway World called Falsettos, "Groundbreaking...achingly poignant."
