= 2008 in Latin music =

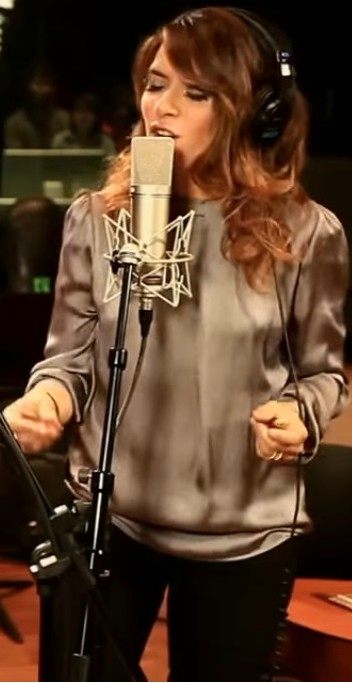
Puerto Rican singer Kany García won the Latin Grammy Award for Best New Artist.

This is a list of notable events in Latin music (i.e. Spanish- and Portuguese-speaking music from Latin America, Latin Europe, and the United States) that took place in 2008.

== Events ==
- January 1 – Declining sales of Latin albums in the United States result in the RIAA lowering the threshold for its Latin certifications: 50,000 for disco de oro, 100,000 for disco de platino, and 200,000 or more for disco de multi-platino. All albums previously certified under the RIAA's Latin program were amended to match the current threshold.
- November 13 – The 9th Annual Latin Grammy Awards are held at the Toyota Center in Houston, Texas.
  - Colombian singer-songwriter Juanes is the most awarded artist of the song with his "Me Enamora" winning the awards for Record of the Year and Song of the Year as well as Album of the Year for the La Vida... Es Un Ratico.
  - Kany García wins Best New Artist.
  - Gloria Estefan is honored as the Latin Recording Academy Person of the Year.

== Number-one albums and singles by country ==
- List of number-one singles of 2008 (Spain)
- List of number-one Billboard Top Latin Albums of 2008
- List of number-one Billboard Hot Latin Songs of 2008

== Awards ==
- 2008 Premio Lo Nuestro
- 2008 Billboard Latin Music Awards
- 2008 Latin Grammy Awards
- 2008 Tejano Music Awards

== Albums released ==
=== First quarter ===
==== January ====
| Day | Title | Artist | Genre(s) | Singles | Label |
|---|---|---|---|---|---|
| 1 | Coração Bandido | Leonardo | Brazilian-romantic | | |
| 1 | El Patio De Tu Casa | Rita Rosa | Children's | | |
| 5 | Zamba Malató | Perú Negro | | | |
| 8 | Búscame | Adolescent's Orquesta | Salsa | "Aquel Lugar" | |
| 15 | Evolution | Bobby Valentín | | | |
| 29 | Homenaje a Juan Luis Guerra | Marlon | Salsa | "Bachata Rosa" "La Bilirrubina" | |

==== February ====
| Day | Title | Artist | Genre(s) | Singles | Label |
|---|---|---|---|---|---|
| 5 | Listos, Montados Y Armados | Los Creadorez del Pasito Duranguense de Alfredo Ramírez | Regional Mexican | | |
| 5 | Que Ganas de Volver | Conjunto Primavera | Regional Mexican | | |
| 5 | Tour 2007 | Héroes del Silencio | Rock en español | | |
| 5 | Auténtico | Grupo Galé | Salsa | | |
| 5 | Rhythm & Romance | Kenny G | | | |
| 5 | Avatar | Gonzalo Rubalcaba | | | |
| 12 | Domingo | Elida Reyna | Tejano | | |
| 15 | Pensando en Ti | Germán Montero | Regional Mexican | | Fonovisa |
| 19 | En Vivo: Desde el Auditorio Nacional | K-Paz de la Sierra | Regional Mexican | | Disa |
| 26 | Planeta Kumbia | A.B. Quintanilla y Los Kumbia All Starz | Cumbia | "Por Ti Baby" "Rica y Apretadita" | EMI Latin |
| 26 | Corridos: Defendiendo el Honor | Pesado | "Norteño" | | |
| 26 | Allenrok | Estopa | | | |
| 26 | Regalo | Pablo Milanés | | | |

==== March ====
| Day | Title | Artist | Genre(s) | Singles | Label |
|---|---|---|---|---|---|
| 3 | Dentro do Mar Tem Rio - Ao Vivo | Maria Bethânia | MPB | | |
| 4 | Raíces | Los Tigres del Norte | Norteño | | |
| 4 | Ayer, Hoy y Siempre | Los Horóscopos de Durango | Banda | | |
| 4 | Esse Som Vai Te Levar - Ao Vivo | Harmonia do Samba | Brazilian roots | | |
| 10 | Maldito Tango | Melingo | Tango | | |
| 11 | Con Banda | Dareyes de la Sierra | Banda | "Hasta el Día de Hoy" | Disa |
| 11 | Showtime | Angel & Khriz | Reggaeton | "La Vecina" "Na De Na" | Machete Music |
| 13 | Marooned/Aislado | Papo Vázquez and The Mighty Pirates | Latin jazz | | |
| 16 | Ao Vivo no Estúdio | Arnaldo Antunes | Brazilian pop | | |
| 18 | El Canta Autor Del Pueblo | Espinoza Paz | Banda | | Disa |
| 25 | Insatisfecha | Diana Reyes | Duranguense | | |
| 25 | La Melodía de la Calle | Tony Dize | Reggaeton | "Permítame" | Machete Music |
| 25 | Afro Bop Alliance | Caribbean Jazz Project | Latin jazz | | |
| 25 | Omara Portuondo e Maria Bethânia | Omara Portuondo and Maria Bethânia | MPB | | |
| 25 | Dinamico | Charlie Cruz | Salsa | "Tu Me Confundes" | |
| 27 | Enrique Iglesias: 95/08 Éxitos | Enrique Iglesias | Latin pop | "¿Dónde Están Corazón?" "Lloro Por Ti" | Universal Music Latino |

=== Second quarter ===
==== April ====
| Day | Title | Artist | Genre(s) | Singles | Label |
|---|---|---|---|---|---|
| 1 | Refréscate! | Aline Barros | Latin Christian | | |
| 4 | Heir to the Throne | Albert Zamora | Tejano | | |
| 7 | Frutero Moderno | Gonzalo Grau y la Clave Secreta | Tropical | | |
| 8 | Song for Chico | Arturo O'Farrill and the Afro-Latin Jazz Orchestra | Latin jazz | | |
| 8 | Balmoral | Loquillo | Rock en español | | |
| 8 | Dos Pajaros de un Tiro | Joan Manuel Serrat and Joaquín Sabina | | | |
| 14 | Gózalo | Orquesta La 33 | Salsa | | |
| 15 | Renacer | Dark Latin Groove | Salsa | "Quiero Decirte Que Te Amo" | |
| 15 | El Tiro de Gracia | Lupillo Rivera | Banda | | |
| 15 | Pa'Lante | Willy Chirino | Salsa | "Pa'Lante | |
| 22 | Con Todas Las Ganar | NG2 | Salsa | "Ella Menea" | |
| 22 | Dime Mi Amor | Pedro Fernández | Ranchera | | |
| 27 | Arde el Cielo | Maná | Latin pop | "Si No Te Hubieras Ido" "Arde el Cielo" | Warner Music Latina |
| 29 | Cara B | Jorge Drexler | Latin pop | | Warner Music Latina |
| 29 | Vive y Dejame Vivir | Cuisillos | Banda | | |

==== May ====
| Day | Title | Artist | Genre(s) | Singles | Label |
|---|---|---|---|---|---|
| 6 | Cómplices | Luis Miguel | Latin pop | "Si Tú Te Atreves" "Te Desean" | Warner Music Latina |
| 6 | Mucho | Babasónicos | | | |
| 11 | The Comeback: Back To Business | Baby Rasta & Gringo | Reggaeton | | Eme Music |
| 13 | Nadha | Kudai | Latin pop | | |
| 13 | Pasión Española | Plácido Domingo | Classical | | |
| 19 | Fiesta | Gustavo Dudamel | Classical | | |
| 20 | The Latin Side of Wayne Shorter | Conrad Herwig and the Latin Side Band | Latin jazz | | |
| 20 | Amor, Dolor y Lágrimas: Música Ranchera | Mariachi Los Camperos de Nati Cano | Mariachi | | |
| 20 | Cultural Survival | David Sánchez | Latin jazz | | |
| 20 | Romance | Rosa Passos | Brazilian pop | | |
| 27 | Mas Alla de La Distancia | Tierra Cali | Regional Mexican | | |
| 27 | Gratitud | Fonseca | Tropipop | "Enrédame" "Arroyito" | EMI |
| 27 | Difícil Não Falar de Amor | Daniel | Brazilian-romantic | | |

==== June ====
| Day | Title | Artist | Genre(s) | Singles | Label |
|---|---|---|---|---|---|
| 1 | Orquestra Contemporânea de Olinda | Orquestra Contemporânea de Olinda | Brazilian roots | | |
| 3 | Friends & Legends | Joe Posada | Tejano | | |
| 3 | Nonada | Pau Brasil | Latin jazz | | |
| 10 | Una Noche en Madrid | Marco Antonio Solís | Latin pop | | Fonovisa |
| 10 | 2C | Intocable | Norteño | | |
| 10 | Soy | Víctor Manuelle | Salsa, Latin pop | "Yo No Sé Perdonarte" "No Soy Quién" "Díme" | Kiyavi |
| 10 | MTV Unplugged | Julieta Venegas | Latin pop | "El Presente" "Algún Día" | Sony BMG Norte |
| 10 | Mejores Cantos Religiosos | Grupo Nueva Vida | Latin pop | | |
| 10 | Canciones de Amor | Mariachi Divas | Mariachi | | |
| 10 | Reencuentro | Camarón de la Isla | Flamenco | | |
| 17 | Sonidos Gold | Grupo Fantasma | Latin rock/alternative | | |
| 17 | La Verdad | Locos Por Juana | Latin rock/alternative | | |
| 17 | Me Enamoré de Un Angel | Los Palominos | Norteño | | |
| 17 | Banda Larga Cordel | Gilberto Gil | | | |
| 17 | Un Mañana | Luis Alberto Spinetta | | | |
| 24 | Cada Vez Mas Fuerte | Liberación | Grupero | | |
| 30 | Terra | Mariza | Fado | | |

=== Third quarter ===
==== July ====
| Day | Title | Artist | Genre(s) | Singles | Label |
|---|---|---|---|---|---|
| 1 | Back on the Streets... Taste of Spanish Harlem Vol. 2 | New Swing Sextet | Tropical | | |
| 1 | Viva La Revolucion | Ruben Ramos & The Mexican Revolution | Tejano | | |
| 1 | Acústico | Banda Calypso | Brazilian roots | | |
| 1 | Toda Vez Que Eu Dou Um Passo o Mundo Sai Dolugar | Siba e A Fuloresta | Brazilian roots | | |
| 1 | Ao Vivo em Zoodstock | Inimigos da HP | | | |
| 8 | Si Tú Te Vas | Los Temerarios | Latin pop | "Si Tú Te Vas" "Luz de Luna" | Fonovisa |
| 8 | Six Pack | Siggno | Norteño | | |
| 8 | Grandes Clássicos Sertanejos Acústico I | Chitãozinho & Xororó | | | |
| 8 | Forests | Brazilian Trio | Latin jazz | | |
| 13 | O Trovador Solitário | Renato Russo | Acoustic rock, folk rock | Discobertas/Coqueiro Verde | EMI |
| 15 | Inclassificáveis | Ney Matogrosso | Brazilian pop | | |
| 15 | Senhora Raiz | Roberta Miranda | Brazilian-romantic | | |
| 15 | Ya Me Cansé | El Chaval de la Bachata | Bachata | "¿Dónde Están Esos Amigos?" | |
| 22 | Desde Adentro | Gian Marco | Latin pop | | |
| 22 | Love is Back | Toby Love | Bachata | "Llorar Lloviendo" "Amor Primero" | |
| 29 | Cuidaré de Ti | Alex Campos | Latin Christian | | |
| 31 | Fuego Nuevo | El Trono de México | Regional Mexican | | |

==== August ====
| Day | Title | Artist | Genre(s) | Singles | Label |
|---|---|---|---|---|---|
| 5 | Desde México... "Cumbia Cusinela" | Huichol Musical | | | |
| 5 | Minha Praia | Netinho | Brazilian roots | | |
| 12 | David Cavazos | David Cavazos | | | |
| 12 | Talento de Barrio | Daddy Yankee | Reggaeton | "Somos de Calle" "Pose" "Llamado de Emergencia" "¿Qué Tengo Que Hacer?" | Machete Music |
| 12 | Eternamente Románticos | La Mafia | Grupero | | |
| 18 | Acordes para Hormiguitas y Menudas Criaturas | Strings For Kids | Children's | | |
| 19 | Puro Corazón | Maelo Ruiz | Salsa | | |
| 19 | 15x22 | Caballo Dorado | Grupero | | |
| 21 | El Reino Olvidado | Rata Blanca | Rock en español | | |
| 25 | Río de los Canasteros | Diego Amador | Flamenco | | |
| 26 | Palabras del Silencio | Luis Fonsi | Latin pop | "No Me Doy por Vencido" "Aquí Estoy Yo" "Llueve por Dentro" "Aunque Estes Con Él | Universal Music Latino |
| 26 | Tu Inspiración | Alacranes Musical | Duranguense | | Disa |
| 26 | Vámonos Pa'l Río | Los Pikadientes de Caborca | Norteño | | Sony BMG Norte |
| 26 | América Brasil o Disco | Seu Jorge | MPB | | |
| 26 | Multishow ao Vivo Cê | Caetano Veloso | MPB | | |
| 29 | Tango | Luis Salinas | | | Epsa Music |

==== September ====
| Day | Title | Artist | Genre(s) | Singles | Label |
|---|---|---|---|---|---|
| 1 | Duets | Carlos Franzetti and Eddie Gómez | | | |
| 2 | 45 | Jaguares | | | |
| 2 | O Coração do Homem_Bomba Volume 1 | Zeca Baleiro | MPB | | |
| 2 | Coração Estradeiro | Sérgio Reis | Música sertaneja | | |
| 2 | Dois Mundos | Scott Feiner & Pandeiro Jazz | | | |
| 9 | Jenni | Jenni Rivera | Banda | "Culpable o Inocente" "Chuper Amigos" "Tu Camisa Puesta" | Fonovisa |
| 9 | Real... En Vivo | Ednita Nazario | Latin pop | | Sony BMG Norte |
| 9 | Con México En El Corazón | José Feliciano | Ranchera | | |
| 12 | Parte de Mí | Rosario | Latin pop | | |
| 15 | Mi Fueye Querido | Leopoldo Federico | Tango | | |
| 16 | Será | Presuntos Implicados | Latin pop | | |
| 23 | Teatro | Draco Rosa | Latin rock | | |
| 23 | Así Soy | Issac Delgado | Salsa | | |
| 23 | Simplemente La Verdad | Franco De Vita | Latin pop | "Mi Sueño" "Cuando Tus Ojos Me Miran Así" | Sony BMG Norte |
| 23 | Folklore | Soledad | | | |
| 24 | Labiata | Lenine | | | |
| 24 | Telecoteco | Paula Morelenbaum | | | |
| 29 | Gracias | Omara Portuondo | Tropical | | |
| 30 | Un Día Más | Reik | Latin pop | "Inolvidable" "Fui" "No Desaparecerá" "Voy a Estar" | Sony BMG Norte |
| 30 | A las cinco en el Astoria | La Oreja de Van Gogh | Latin pop | | |
| 30 | Miedo Escenico | Beto Cuevas | Rock en español | | |
| 30 | Tranquilamente... Tranquilo | Oscar D'León | Salsa | | |
| 30 | Uma Prova de Amor | Zeca Pagodinho | Samba | | |

=== Fourth quarter ===
==== October ====
| Day | Title | Artist | Genre(s) | Singles | Label |
|---|---|---|---|---|---|
| 6 | Un día | Juana Molina | Folk electronic | | |
| 7 | No Molestar | Marco Antonio Solís | Latin pop | "No Molestar" "Nada Que Me Recuerde a Ti" | Fonovisa |
| 7 | Solamente El Gallo de Oro | Valentín Elizalde | Banda | | Fonovisa |
| 7 | The Legend Continues...La Continuation | Jimmy González & El Grupo Mazz | Tejano | | |
| 7 | Freedom Tour 2008 | Jaime & Los Chamacos | Tejano | | |
| 9 | The Royalty: La Realeza | R.K.M & Ken-Y | Reggaeton | "Mis Días Sin Ti" "Te Regalo Amores" | Pina |
| 10 | Hellville de Luxe | Enrique Bunbury | Rock en español | | |
| 10 | Una Hora A Tokyo | Airbag | Rock en español | | |
| 13 | Buena Vista Social Club at Carnegie Hall | Buena Vista Social Club | Tropical | | World Circuit |
| 14 | Una Navidad con Gilberto | Gilberto Santa Rosa | Salsa | "Me Gustan Las Navidades" "La Fiesta No Es Para Feos" | Sony BMG Norte |
| 14 | Radio Rompecorazones | Daniel Santacruz | Bachata | | |
| 21 | Nosotros Somos | Grupo Montéz de Durango | Regional Mexican | | |
| 21 | Live At Caramoor | Jovino Santos Neto and Weber Lago | | | |
| 21 | Los de Atrás Vienen Conmigo | Calle 13 | Latin urban | "No Hay Nadie Como Tú" "Electro Movimiento" "La Perla" "Fiesta de Locos" | Sony BMG Norte |
| 28 | Solo o en Compañía de Otros | Miguel Ríos | Rock en español | | |
| 28 | Dos Canciones Clasicas De Marco Antonio Solis | Tito Nieves | Salsa | "Mi Eterno Amor Secreto" | |

==== November ====
| Day | Title | Artist | Genre(s) | Singles | Label |
|---|---|---|---|---|---|
| 1 | Zé Ramalho Canta Bob Dylan – Tá Tudo Mudando | Zé Ramalho | Brazilian rock | | |
| 4 | Almas Gemelas | El Trono de México | Banda | "Almas Gemelas" | |
| 4 | Chapter Dos | Xtreme | Bachata | | |
| 4 | Amor Aventurero | Los Invasores de Nuevo León | Norteño | | |
| 7 | Borboletas | Victor & Leo | Música sertaneja | | |
| 7 | A Casa Amarela | Veveta and Saulinho | Children's | | |
| 11 | Wisin & Yandel Presentan: La Mente Maestra | DJ Nesty and Wisin & Yandel | Reggaeton | "Me Estás Tentando" "Desnudemonos" / "Sex" "Cositas Macabras" | Machete Music |
| 11 | Primavera Anticipada | Laura Pausini | Latin pop | "En Cambió No" "Primavera Anticipada (It Is My Song)" "Un Hecho Facto" | Warner Music Latina |
| 11 | Día Azul | Jimena Ángel | Latin pop | | |
| 11 | Guasábara | José Lugo Orchestra | Salsa | | |
| 11 | Juntos Para Siempre | Bebo Valdés and Chucho Valdés | Latin jazz | | |
| 16 | Roberto Carlos e Caetano Veloso e a Música de Tom Jobim | Roberto Carlos and Caetano Veloso | Bossa nova | | Sony BMG |
| 18 | Te Presumo | Banda el Recodo | Banda | "Te Presumo" | Fonovisa |
| 18 | La Borrachera | Los Inquietos del Norte | Banda | | |
| 18 | Te Amo | Makano | Reggaeton | "Te Amo" | Machete Music |
| 18 | 5to Piso | Ricardo Arjona | Latin pop | "Como Duele" "Sin Ti... Sin Mi" "Ni Tú Ni Yo" "Tocando Fondo" "Suavecito" "Por Si Regresas" | Warner Music Latina |
| 18 | Primera Fila | Vicente Fernández | Ranchera | "El Último Beso" | Sony BMG Norte |
| 18 | Aire | Luz Rios | Latin pop | | |
| 19 | Amaia Montero | Amaia Montero | Latin pop | | |
| 25 | Charlie Sepulveda & The Turnaround | Charlie Sepulveda & The Turnaround | Latin jazz | | |
| 25 | De Mi Puña y Letra | Carlos Baute | Latin pop | "Colgando en tus manos | |
| 27 | Alex Lora de El Three a El Tri Rolas del Alma, Mi Mente y Mi Aferración | El Tri | Rock en español | | |
| 30 | Ivy Queen 2008 World Tour LIVE! | Ivy Queen | Reggaeton, Hip hop | "Dime" | Machete Music |

==== December ====
| Day | Title | Artist | Genre(s) | Singles | Label |
|---|---|---|---|---|---|
| 1 | Vitor e Vitória | Vitor e Vitória | Children's | | |
| 2 | 15 Años de Corazón | Grupo Manía | Merengue | "Maríalola" | |
| 3 | Mediocre | Ximena Sariñana | Latin rock/alternative | | |
| 7 | E A Música De Tom Jobim | Roberto Carlos and Caetano Veloso | | | |
| 9 | Compañeras | Mariachi Reyna de Los Angeles | Mariachi | | |
| 9 | Yo Seré El Amor | Cacho Castaña | Tango | | |
| 16 | Manny Manuel...En Vivo! | Manny Manuel | Merengue | "No Me Hagas Sufrir" "Si una Vez/Pero Que Necesidad" "Yo Voy a Darte" | RMM Records |
| 16 | El Sonidito | Hechizeros Band | Regional Mexican | | |
| 16 | Villa-Lobos: Piano Music; Guia Pratico, Albums 10 and 11; Suite Infantil Nos. 1 and 2 | Sonia Rubinsky | Classical | | |
| 16 | Gabriel Amor Inmortal | Various artists | Latin pop | "Amor Inmortal" | |
| 16 | Dos | Fanny Lú | Tropipop | "Tú No Eres Para Mi" "Celos" "Corazón Perdido" "Mar de Amor" | |
| 16 | Elvis Crespo Lives: Live from Las Vegas | Elvis Crespo | Merengue | "Me Gusta, Me Gusta" | |
| 22 | The Comeback | Trebol Clan | Reggaeton | | La Corte |

=== Unknown dates ===
| Title | Artist | Genre(s) | Singles | Label |
|---|---|---|---|---|
| Cuidado | Solido | Norteño | | |
| Music Lessons | Chente Barrera y Taconazo | Tejano | | |
| All That Jazz... | Tortilla Factory | Tejano | | |
| Efecto Dominó | Chetes | Rock en español | | |
| Pra Cá E Para Lá | Paulo Moura | | | |
| Cura-Me | Fernanda Brum | Latin Christian | | |
| Sobrenatural | Andre Valadao | Latin Christian | | |
| O Retorno de Saturno | Detonautas Roque Clube | Brazilian rock | | |
| Reptilectric | Zoé | Latin alternative | | |
| Estudando A Bossa - Nordeste Plaza | Tom Zé | | | |
| Depois da Guerra | Oficina G3 | Latin Christian | | |
| La Plata | Jota Quest | Brazilian pop | | |
| Estandarte | Skank | Brazilian pop | | |
| Agora | NX Zero | Brazilian rock | | |
| Regência: Vince Mendoza | Ivan Lins and the Metropole Orchestra | MPB | | |
| Voz do Coração (Ao Vivo) | César Menotti & Fabiano | Música sertaneja | | |
| Fuerte y caliente | Onda Vaga | Latin folk | | |
| Plato único bailable | Chico Trujillo | Cumbia | | |
| Oro | ChocQuibTown | Latin alternative, hip hop | | |

== Best-selling records ==
=== Best-selling albums ===
The following is a list of the top 10 best-selling Latin albums in the United States in 2008, according to Billboard.

| Rank | Album | Artist |
|---|---|---|
| 1 | Wisin vs. Yandel: Los Extraterrestres | Wisin & Yandel |
| 2 | Para Siempre | Vicente Fernández |
| 3 | La Mejor... Colección | Marco Antonio Solís |
| 4 | Te Quiero: Romantic Style in da World | Flex |
| 5 | Enrique Iglesias: 95/08 Éxitos | Enrique Iglesias |
| 6 | Kings of Bachata: Sold Out at Madison Square Garden | Aventura |
| 7 | Todo Cambió | Camila |
| 8 | La Vida... Es Un Ratico | Juanes |
| 9 | Capaz de Todo Por Ti | K-Paz de la Sierra |
| 10 | Historia de un Ídolo, Vol. 1 | Vicente Fernández |

=== Best-performing songs ===
The following is a list of the top 10 best-performing Latin songs in the United States in 2008, according to Billboard.

| Rank | Album | Artist |
|---|---|---|
| 1 | "Te Quiero" | Flex |
| 2 | "Si No Te Hubieras Ido" | Maná |
| 3 | "¿Dónde Están Corazón?" | Enrique Iglesias |
| 4 | "Me Enamora" | Juanes |
| 5 | "Hasta el Día de Hoy" | Los Dareyes de la Sierra |
| 6 | "Para Siempre" | Vicente Fernández |
| 7 | "No Me Doy por Vencido" | Luis Fonsi |
| 8 | "Gotas de Agua Dulce" | Juanes |
| 9 | "Sobre Mis Pies" | La Arrolladora Banda El Limón |
| 10 | "Estos Celos" | Vicente Fernández |

== Deaths ==
- January 8 – Irvan Perez, 85, American Isleño décima singer and woodcarver, heart attack.
- January 12 – Gabriel "Gabo" Manelli, Argentine bass player (Babasónicos)
- February 4 – Tata Güines, 77, Cuban percussionist, kidney infection.
- March 22 – Cachao, 89, Cuban musician credited with creating mambo, renal failure.
- March 29 – Gerardo "Toto" Rotblat, 38, Argentine percussionist (Los Fabulosos Cadillacs)
- April 21 – Monna Bell, 70, Chilean singer
- June 11 – Pablo Raul Alarcon, 82, founder of Spanish Broadcasting System
- June 25 – Sylvinha Araújo, 56, Brazilian singer and songwriter
- June 30 – Ángel Tavira, 83, Mexican musician and actor, kidney complications.
- July (unknown day) – Daniel García Blanco, marimba player and music professor
- August 16 – Dorival Caymmi, 94, Brazilian singer and songwriter
- August 19 – Marta Pérez, Cuban mezzo-soprano
- September 18 – Mauricio Kagel, 76, Argentine-born German composer.
- September 24 – Ramón Calduch, 79, Spanish singer
- October 22 – Luis Silva
- November 16 – Lupita Palomera, 94, Mexican singer
- November 30 – Joan Baptista Humet, 58, Spanish singer and songwriter
- December 16 – Harold Gramatges, 90, Cuban composer and pianist.
