= Entren Los Que Quieran Tour =

2011–12 concert tour by Calle 13

Entren Los Que Quieran
- Tour by Calle 13
- Associated album: Entren Los Que Quieran
- Start date: January 20, 2011
- End date: December 15, 2012
- No. of shows: 42 in North America; 29 in South America; 21 in Europe; 92 Total (to date)

Calle 13 concert chronology
- Entren Los Que Quieran (2011-2012); Multi Viral Tour (2014)

The Entren Los Que Quieran Tour is an international tour by Puerto Rican group Calle 13 in support of the band's 2010 release, Entren Los Que Quieran.

== Opening Acts ==
- Villa Cariño (Concepción)
- Mr. Pauer (Miami)
- Matamba (La Paz)
- ChocQuibTown (Barranquilla)
- Humberto Pernett (Barranquilla)
- B-Side Players (San Diego)

== Setlist ==
1. "Vamo’ a portarnos mal"
2. "No Hay Nadie Como Tú"
3. "Baile de los Pobres"
4. "Digo lo que Pienso"
5. "Ven y Critícame"
6. "Pa'l Norte"
7. "La Bala"
8. "La Cumbia de los Aburridos"
9. "La Perla"
10. "El Hormiguero"
11. "La Vuelta al Mundo"
12. "Tango del Pecado"
13. "Sin Exagerar"
14. "Suave"
15. "Chulin Culin Chunfly"
16. "Muerte en Hawaii"
17. "Atrévete-te-te"

Encore

18. "Calma Pueblo"
19. "Un Beso de Desayuno / La Jirafa"
20. "Latinoamérica"
21. "Fiesta de Locos"

Notes

- In Puerto Rico the songs "La Perla", "Sin Exagerar" and "Latinoamérica" were performed featuring Rubén Blades, Tego Calderón and Lucecita Benitez respectively.

== Tour dates ==
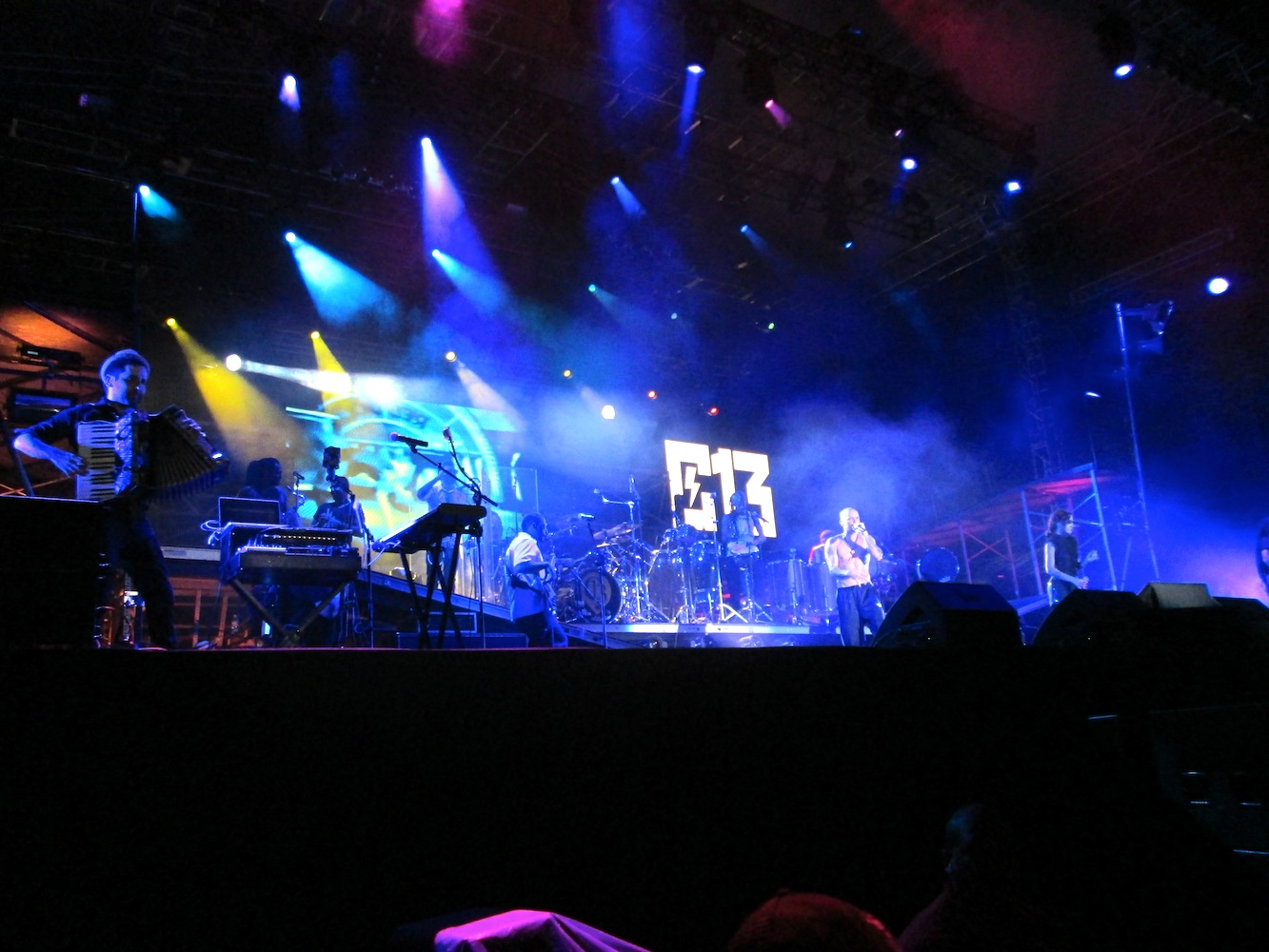
The stage for the tour.

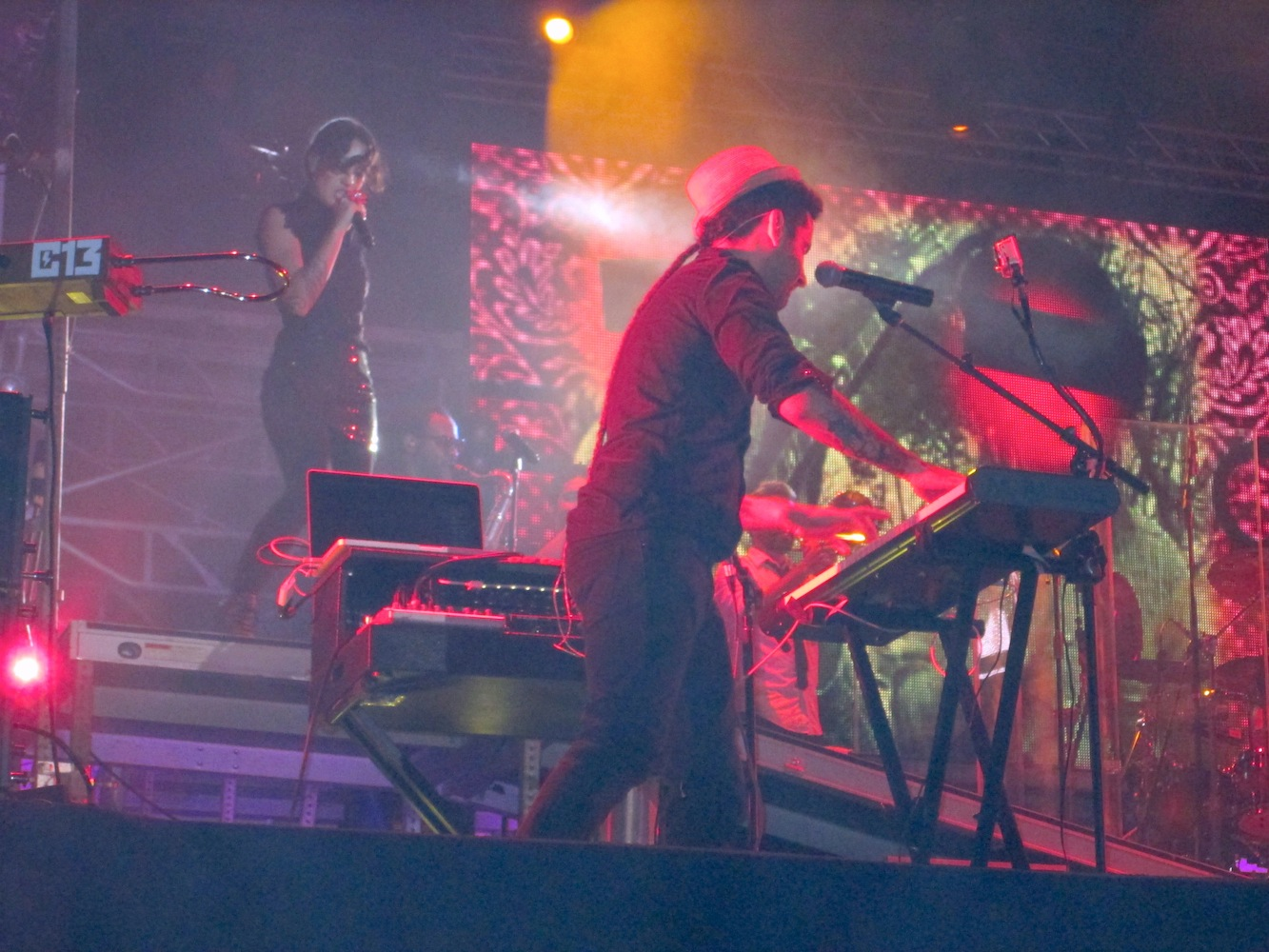
Visitante and PG-13 during the concert in San Juan.

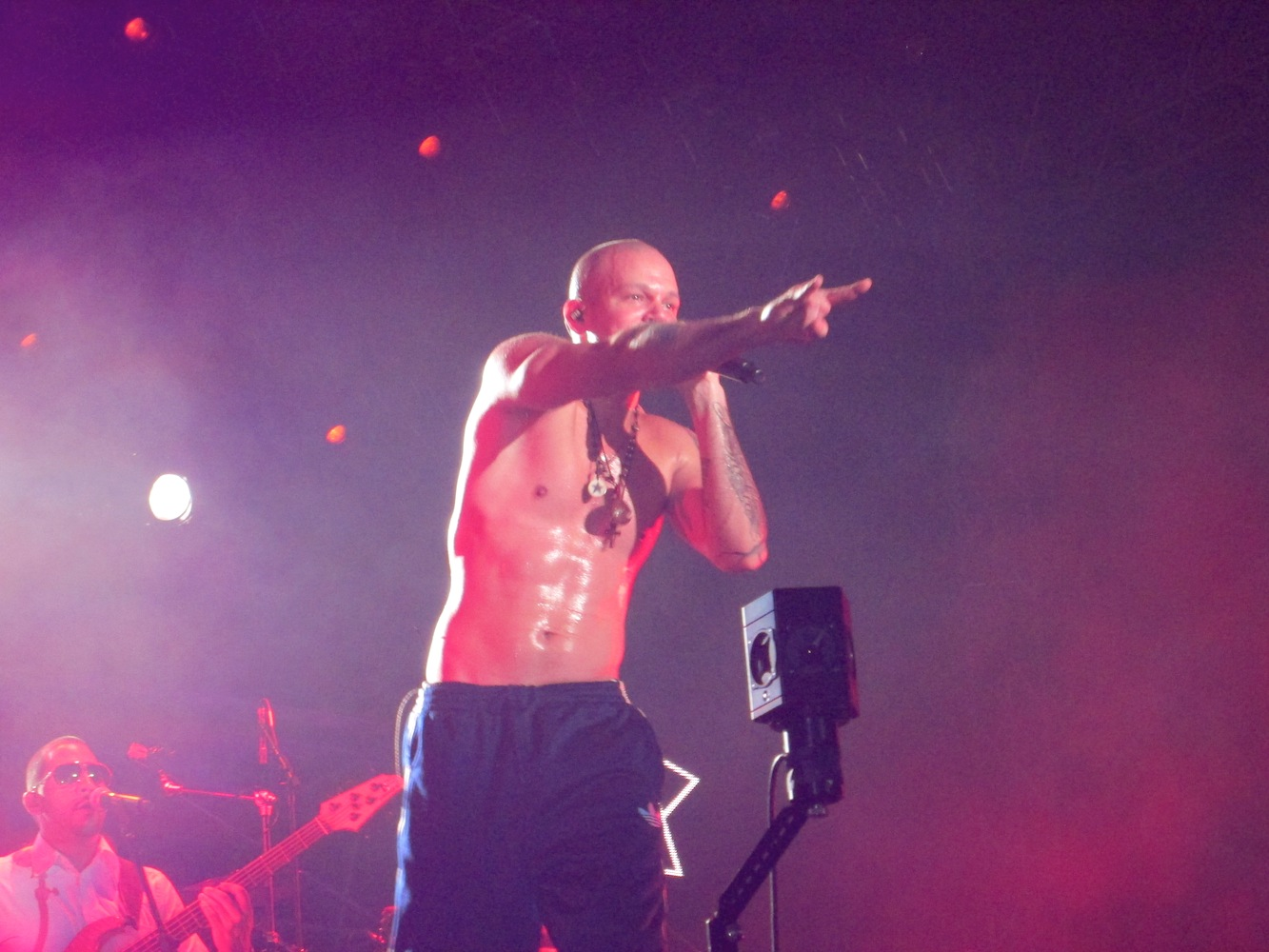
Residente singing No Hay Nadie Como Tú in Puerto Rico.

Date	City	Country	Venue
North America
January 20, 2011	Santo Domingo	Dominican Republic	Port of Santo Domingo
South America
February 11, 2011	Córdoba	Argentina	Cosquin Rock
February 18, 2011	Buenos Aires	Argentina	Luna Park
February 19, 2011	Buenos Aires	Argentina	Luna Park
February 23, 2011	Viña del Mar	Chile	Quinta Vergara Amphitheater
February 24, 2011	Mendoza	Argentina	Fiesta Nacional de la Vendimia
February 26, 2011	Resistencia	Argentina	Luna Park
March 1, 2011	Salta	Argentina	Estadio Padre Ernesto Martearena
March 2, 2011	Corrientes	Argentina	Arazaty Beach
March 3, 2011	Córdoba	Argentina	Personal Pop Festival
North America
March 13, 2011	Mérida	Mexico	Complejo Deportivo La Inalámbrica
March 15, 2011	Managua	Nicaragua	Galerías Santo Domingo
March 16, 2011	San José	Costa Rica	Festival de las Artes
March 17, 2011	Mexico City	Mexico	Playa del Carmen
March 18, 2011	Morelia	Mexico	
March 20, 2011	Veracruz	Mexico	Cumbre Tajin
South America
April 7, 2011	Barranquilla	Colombia	Romelio Martínez Stadium
April 8, 2011	Bogotá	Colombia	Parque Zona F
April 9, 2011	Cali	Colombia	Festival Estéreo Picnic
North America
May 5, 2011	Washington, D.C.	United States	El Boquerón II
May 6, 2011	New York City	United States	Irving Plaza
May 7, 2011	Chicago	United States	Congress Theater
May 8, 2011	Edinburg	United States	Edinburg Stadium
May 9, 2011	Dallas	United States	House of Blues
May 11, 2011	San Francisco	United States	
May 12, 2011	Los Angeles	United States	Nokia Theatre L.A. Live
May 14, 2011	San Francisco	United States	The Factory
May 15, 2011	Sacramento	United States	
May 27, 2011	Miami	United States	
May 29, 2011	Las Vegas	United States	Mandalay Bay
August 19, 2011	Puebla Tuxpan	Mexico	Centro Cultural Siglo 21
August 20, 2011	Tuxpan	Mexico	
August 21, 2011	Mexico City	Mexico	Rock & Exa
August 24, 2011	Guadalajara	Mexico	Festival Exa
August 26, 2011	Baja California	Mexico	
August 27, 2011	Querétaro	Mexico	EcoCentro Expositor Querétaro
South America
September 3, 2011	Concepción	Chile	Suractivo
North America
October 15, 2011	Miami	United States	American Airlines Arena
October 16, 2011	New York City	United States	Best Buy Theater
October 20, 2011	Anaheim	United States	House of Blues
October 21, 2011	San Diego	United States	4th & B
October 22, 2011	San Francisco	United States	The Fillmore
October 23, 2011	Las Vegas	United States	House of Blues
South America
October 28, 2011	Rosario	Argentina	Parque Urquiza
October 29, 2011	Córdoba	Argentina	Orfeo Superdomo
October 30, 2011	Mar del Plata	Argentina	Polideportivo Islas Malvinas
November 4, 2011	Neuquén	Argentina	Estadio Ruca Che
November 26, 2011	La Paz	Bolivia	Teatro al Aire Libre
December 2, 2011	Arequipa	Peru	Jardín de la Cerveza
December 3, 2011	Lima	Peru	Estadio Universidad San Marcos
April 28, 2012	Maracaibo	Venezuela	Aquaventura Park
April 29, 2012	Mérida	Venezuela	Estadio Metropolitano de Mérida
May 1, 2012	San Cristóbal	Venezuela	Plaza Monumental de Toros de Pueblo Nuevo
May 2, 2012	Caracas	Venezuela	Paseo de los Próceres
North America
May 12, 2012	Oakland	United States	Fox Oakland Theatre
May 13, 2012	Los Angeles	United States	Nokia Theatre L.A. Live
May 22, 2012	Mexico City	Mexico	El Lunario del Auditorio
May 23, 2012	Tepic	Mexico	
May 25, 2012	Sonora	Mexico	Joven de las Fiestas del Pitic
May 26, 2012	Mexico City	Mexico	Wirikuta Fest
July 13, 2012	New York City	United States	Prospect Park
Europe
July 20, 2012	Valladolid	Spain	Recinto Ferial
July 21, 2012	Gijón	Spain	Plaza la Laboral
July 22, 2012	Freiburg	Germany	Zelt Music Festival
July 24, 2012	Pau	France	Festival Emmaus
July 25, 2012	Santiago de Compostela	Spain	Fiestas de Santiago
July 26, 2012	Madrid	Spain	Madrid Arena
July 27, 2012	Barcelona	Spain	Salsa & Latin Jazz Barcelona Festival
July 28, 2012	Vence	France	Festival Nuits Du Sud
July 29, 2012	Vic-Fezensac	France	Tempo Latino
July 31, 2012	Karlsruhe	Germany	Zeltival
August 1, 2012	Lyss	Switzerland	Kalturfabrik Kufa
August 4, 2012	Zambujeira do Mar	Portugal	Festival Sudoeste
August 5, 2012	Cádiz	Spain	Castle of San Sebastián
August 10, 2012	Galicia	Spain	Festival Brincadeira
August 12, 2012	Aranda de Duero	Spain	Sonorama
August 15, 2012	Berlin	Germany	Huxley's Neue Welt
August 16, 2012	Malmö	Sweden	Moriska Paviljongen
August 17, 2012	Hamburg	Germany	Fabrik
August 18, 2012	Amsterdam	Netherlands	Paradiso
August 19, 2012	Antwerp	Belgium	Open Air Theatre Rivierenhof
August 21, 2012	Benicàssim	Spain	Rototom Sunsplash
South America
September 14, 2012	Barranquilla	Colombia	Romelio Martínez Stadium
North America
November 2, 2012	Querétaro	Mexico	Querétaro Municipal Stadium
South America
November 11, 2012	Santiago	Chile	Club de Campo Las Vizcachas
November 13, 2012	São Paulo	Brazil	Cine Joia
November 15, 2012	Montevideo	Uruguay	Velódromo Municipal
November 19, 2012	La Plata	Argentina	Plaza Moreno
North America
November 24, 2012	Monterrey	Mexico	Parque Diego Rivera
November 25, 2012	Durango	Mexico	Plaza IV Centenario
December 1, 2012	Mexico City	Mexico	Palacio de los Deportes
December 15, 2012	San Juan	Puerto Rico	Isla Grande Pier
