= 10th Annual Latin Grammy Awards =

Music awards presented Nov 2009

10th Latin Grammy Awards
- Date: November 5, 2009
- Venue: Mandalay Bay Events Center, Paradise, Nevada
- Hosted by: Eugenio Derbez and Lucero

Highlights
- Person of the Year: Juan Gabriel

Television/radio coverage
- Network: Univision

The 10th Annual Latin Grammy Awards took place on Thursday, November 5, 2009, at the Mandalay Bay Events Center in Las Vegas, Nevada. This was the second time the show took place in Las Vegas. Juan Gabriel was honored as the Latin Recording Academy Person of the Year on November 4, the day prior to the telecast. Calle 13 were the big winners, winning five awards including Album of the Year. 2009 marked the tenth anniversary of the Latin Grammy Awards.

== Awards ==
Winners are in bold text.

=== General ===
Record of the Year

Calle 13 featuring Café Tacuba — "No Hay Nadie Como Tú"

- Luis Fonsi featuring Aleks Syntek, Noel Schajris and David Bisbal — "Aquí Estoy Yo"
- Ivan Lins and the Metropole Orchestra — "Arlequim Desconhecido"
- José Lugo Orchestra featuring Gilberto Santa Rosa — "Si No Vas a Cocinar"
- Laura Pausini — "En Cambio No"

Album of the Year

Calle 13 — Los de Atrás Vienen Conmigo

- Andrés Cepeda — Día Tras Día
- Luis Enrique — Ciclos
- Ivan Lins and the Metropole Orchestra — Regência: Vince Mendoza
- Mercedes Sosa — Cantora 1

Song of the Year

Claudia Brant, Luis Fonsi and Gen Reuben — "Aquí Estoy Yo" (Luis Fonsi featuring Aleks Syntek, Noel Schajris and David Bisbal)

- Yoel Henríquez and Jorge Luis Piloto — "Día Tras Día" (Andrés Cepeda)
- Bebe and Carlos Jean — "Me Fuí" (Bebe)
- Alejandro Lerner — "Verte Sonreir"
- Jorge Luis Piloto and Jorge Villamizar — "Yo No Sé Mañana" (Luis Enrique )

Best New Artist

Alexander Acha

- ChocQuibTown
- Claudio Corsi
- India Martínez
- Luz Rios

=== Pop ===
Best Female Pop Vocal Album

Laura Pausini — Primavera Anticipada

- Jimena Ángel — Día Azul
- Natalia Lafourcade — Hu Hu Hu
- Amaia Montero — Amaia Montero
- Luz Rios — Aire

Best Male Pop Vocal Album

Fito Páez — No sé si es Baires o Madrid

- Andrés Cepeda — Día Tras Día
- Francisco Céspedes — Te Acuerdas...
- Coti — Malditas Canciones
- Alex Ubago — Calle Ilusión

Best Pop Vocal Album by a Duo or Group

Reik — Un Día Más

- Jarabe de Palo — Orquesta Reciclando
- La Oreja de Van Gogh — A las cinco en el Astoria
- La Quinta Estación — Sin Frenos
- Presuntos Implicados — Será

=== Urban ===
Best Urban Music Album

Calle 13 — Los de Atrás Vienen Conmigo

- Daddy Yankee — Talento de Barrio
- Don Omar — iDon
- Tito El Bambino — El Patrón
- Wisin & Yandel — La Revolución

Best Urban Song

Tainy and Wisin & Yandel — "Abusadora" (Wisin & Yandel)

- Marcelo D2 and Nave — "Desabafo" (Marcelo D2)
- Daddy Yankee — "Llamado de Emergencia"
- Wisin & Yandel, 50 Cent and Nesty "La Mente Maestra" — "Mujeres In The Club" (Wisin & Yandel featuring 50 Cent)
- Don Omar — "Sexy Robotica"

=== Rock ===
Best Rock Solo Vocal Album

Draco Rosa — Teatro

- Enrique Bunbury — Hellville de Luxe
- Beto Cuevas — Miedo Escenico
- Miguel Ríos — Solo o en Compañía de Otros
- Luis Alberto Spinetta — Un Mañana

Best Rock Vocal Album by a Duo or Group

Jaguares — 45

- Airbag — Una Hora A Tokyo
- El Tri — Alex Lora de El Three a El Tri Rolas del Alma, Mi Mente y Mi Aferración
- Rata Blanca — El Reino Olvidado
- Volován — Hogar

Best Rock Song

Saúl Hernández — "Entre Tus Jardines" (Jaguares)

- Walter Giardino — "El Reino Olvidado" (Rata Blanca)
- Enrique Bunbury — "Hay Muy Poca Gente"
- Jose Luis Belmonte, Diego Frenkel and Sebastián Schachte — "Qué Me Vas a Decir" (La Portuaria)
- Airbag — "Una Hora a Tokyo"

=== Alternative ===
Best Alternative Music Album

Los Amigos Invisibles — Commercial

- Babasónicos — Mucho +
- Kinky — Barracuda
- Novalima — Coba Coba
- Zoé — Reptilectric

Best Alternative Song

Calle 13 and Café Tacuba — "No Hay Nadie Como Tú"

- Hello Seahorse! — "Bestia"
- Andrés Levin, Cucu Diamantes, Beatriz Luengo and Yotuel Romero — "Más Fuerte" (CuCu Diamantes)
- Camila Moreno — "Millones"
- Macaco — "Moving"
- Alex Pérez and Juan Son — "Nada" (Juan Son)

=== Tropical ===
Best Salsa Album

Luis Enrique — Ciclos

- Oscar D'León — Tranquilamente... Tranquilo
- Issac Delgado — Así Soy
- José Lugo Orchestra — Guasábara
- Gilberto Santa Rosa — Contraste en Salsa

Best Cumbia/Vallenato Album

Peter Manjarrés and Sergio Luis Rodríguez — El Caballero "Del Vallenato"

- Silvestre Dangond and Juancho de la Espriella — El Original: La Revolución
- Diomedes Díaz — Celebremos Juntos
- Kvrass — Ombe y Como No!!
- Iván Villazón and José María "Chema" Ramos — El Vallenato Mayor

Best Contemporary Tropical Album

Omara Portuondo — Gracias

- Coronel — Superstición
- Eddy Herrera — Paso Firme
- Daniel Santacruz — Radio Rompecorazones
- Sin Ánimo De Lucro — Todo Pasa Por Algo

Best Traditional Tropical Album

Gilberto Santa Rosa — Una Navidad con Gilberto

- Orquesta América — Siempre a Punto
- María Dolores Pradera and Los Sabandeños — Te Canto Un Bolero
- Totó La Momposina — La Bodega
- Orestes Vilató — It's About Time

Best Tropical Song

Jorge Luis Piloto and Jorge Villamizar — "Yo No Sé Mañana" (Luis Enrique)

- Daniel Santacruz — "A Donde Va El Amor?"
- Joan M. Ortiz and Tito "El Bambino" — "El Amor" (Tito "El Bambino")
- Juan de Luque Díaz Granados and Juan Vicente Zambrano — "Esa Muchachita" (Mauricio & Palodeagua)
- Alberto Gaitán and Ricardo Gaitán — "No Vale La Pena" (Issac Delgado)

=== Singer-Songwriter ===
Best Singer-Songwriter Album

Caetano Veloso — Zii e Zie

- Ricardo Arjona — 5to Piso
- Franco De Vita — Simplemente La Verdad
- Rosana — A Las Buenas y A Las Malas
- Tom Zé — Estudando A Bossa - Nordeste Plaza

=== Regional Mexican ===
Best Ranchero Album

Vicente Fernández — Primera Fila

- Shaila Dúrcal — Corazón Ranchero
- José Feliciano — Con México En El Corazón
- Mariachi Reyna de Los Angeles — Compañeras
- Diego Verdaguer — Mexicano Hasta las Pampas

Best Banda Album

Alacranes Musical — Tu Inspiración

- Cuisillos de Arturo Macias — Vientos de Cambio
- Dareyes de la Sierra — Una Copa Mas
- Valentín Elizalde — Solamente El Gallo de Oro
- Germán Montero — Compréndeme

Best Grupero Album

Caballo Dorado — 15 × 22

- Pipe Bueno — Pipe Bueno
- La Mafia — Eternamente Románticos
- Liberación — Cada Vez Mas Fuerte
- Marco Antonio Solís — No Molestar

Best Tejano Album

Jimmy González & El Grupo Mazz — The Legend Continues...La Continuation

- Avizo — Recordando Josefa
- Grupo Vida — Generations
- Joel Guzman and Sarah Fox — Conjuntazzo
- Jaime & Los Chamacos — Freedom Tour 2008
- Jay Perez — All The Way Live!

Best Norteño Album

Grupo Pesado — Sólo Contigo

- Cardenales de Nuevo León — Se Renta Un Corazón
- Costumbre — Siempre
- Los Huracanes del Norte — Mi Complemento
- Los Invasores de Nuevo León — Amor Aventurero
- Los Rieleros del Norte — Pese a Quien le Pese

Best Regional Song

Marco Antonio Solís — "No Molestar"

- Santa Benith and Ediregi — "Almas Gemelas" (El Trono de México)
- Espinoza Paz — "Espero" (Grupo Montéz de Durango)
- Mario Quintero Lara — "Se Fue Mi Amor" (Los Tucanes de Tijuana)
- Joan Sebastian — "Voy A Conquistarte" (Diego Verdaguer)

=== Instrumental ===
Best Instrumental Album

Carlos Franzetti and Eddie Gómez — Duets

- Jovino Santos Neto and Weber Lago — Live At Caramoor
- Mauro Senise — Lua Cheia Mauro Senise Toca Dolores Duran E Sueli Costa
- Omar Sosa — Across The Divide
- Bernie Williams — Moving Forward

=== Traditional ===
Best Folk Album

Mercedes Sosa — Cantora 1

- Eva Ayllón — Kimba Fá
- Los Muñequitos de Matanzas — D' Palo Pa' Rumba
- Walter Silva — Ya No Le Camino Mas
- Soledad — Folklore

Best Tango Album

Leopoldo Federico — Mi Fueye Querido

- Cacho Castaña — Yo Seré El Amor
- Melingo — Maldito Tango
- María Estela Monti — Solo Piazzolla
- Narcotango — En Vivo
- Various Artists — TangoNuevo 2.1 De Jaime Wilensky

Best Flamenco Album

Niña Pastori — Esperando Verte

- Vicente Amigo — Paseo de Gracia
- Carmen Linares — Raíces y Alas
- Enrique Morente — Flamenco
- Miguel Poveda — Coplas del Querer

=== Jazz ===
Best Latin Jazz Album

Bebo Valdés and Chucho Valdés — Juntos Para Siempre

- Brazilian Trio — Forests
- Bobby Sanabria conducting the Manhattan School Of Music Afro-Cuban Jazz Orchestra — Kenya Revisited Live!!!
- Charlie Sepulveda and The Turnaround — Sepulveda Boulevard
- Nestor Torres — Nouveau Latino

=== Christian ===
Best Christian Album (Spanish Language)

Paulina Aguirre — Esperando Tu Voz

- Lucía Parker — Alabanza Y Adoración: Del Corazón
- Promissa — Poquito A Poco
- David Velásquez — Su Trayectoria
- Alan Villatoro — Tuyo Soy

Best Christian Album (Portuguese Language)

Oficina G3 — Depois da Guerra

- Regis Danese — Compromisso
- Marina De Oliveira — Eu Não Vou Parar
- Jozyanne — Eu Tenho A Promessa
- André Valadão — Fé

=== Brazilian ===
Best Brazilian Contemporary Pop Album

Roupa Nova — Em Londres

- Jota Quest — La Plata
- Rita Lee — Multishow ao Vivo
- Ivete Sangalo — Pode Entrar
- Skank — Estandarte

Best Brazilian Rock Album

NX Zero — Agora
Titãs — Sacos Plásticos

- Cachorro Grande — Cinema
- Erasmo Carlos — Rock 'n' Roll
- Zé Ramalho — Zé Ramalho Canta Bob Dylan - Tá Tudo Mudando

Best Samba/Pagode Album

Martinho da Vila — O Pequeno Burguês!!

- Arlindo Cruz — MTV ao Vivo
- Exaltasamba — Ao Vivo na Ilha da Magia
- Harmonia do Samba — Romântico ao Vivo
- Inimigos da Hp — Ao Vivo em Zoodstock
- Zeca Pagodinho — Uma Prova de Amor

Best MPB Album

Ivan Lins and the Metropole Orchestra — Regência: Vince Mendoza

- Zeca Baleiro — O Coração do Homem_Bomba Volume 1
- Zélia Duncan — Pelo Sabor do Gesto
- Jorge Vercillo — Trem da Minha Vida – Ao Vivo
- Wanderléa — Nova Estação

Best Sertaneja Music Album

Sérgio Reis — Coração Estradeiro

- João Bosco & Vinícius — Curtição
- Bruno & Marrone — De Volta aos Bares
- Edson & Hudson — Despedida
- César Menotti & Fabiano — Voz do Coração (Ao Vivo)
- Victor & Leo — Borboletas

Best Native Brazilian Roots Album

Daniel — As Músicas do Filme O Menino da Porteira

- Mazinho Quevedo — Alma Caipira
- Os Serranos — 40 Anos - Sempre Gaúchos!
- Tchê Guri — A Festa
- Tradição — Micareta 2 Sertaneja

Best Tropical Brazilian Roots Album

Elba Ramalho — Balaio de Amor

- Banda Calypso — Amor Sem Fim
- Caju & Castanha — Sorria Você Está Sendo Filmado
- Netinho — Minha Praia
- Orquestra Contemporânea de Olinda — Orquestra Contemporânea de Olinda

Best Brazilian Song

Lenine — "Martelo Bigorna"

- Caetano Veloso — "A Cor Amarela"
- Gigi and Ivete Sangalo — "Agora Eu Já Sei" (Ivete Sangalo)
- Nando Reis — "Ainda Não Passou"
- Dadi, Seu Jorge and Marisa Monte — "Não é Proibido" (Marisa Monte)

=== Children's ===
Best Latin Children Album

Various Artists — Pombo Musical

- Jair Oliveira and Tania Khalill — Grandes Pequeninos
- Rita Rosa — El Patio De Tu Casa
- Ivete Sangalo and Saulo Fernandes (Veveta and Saulinho) — A Casa Amarela
- Vitor and Vitória — Vitor e Vitória

=== Classical ===
Best Classical Album

Sonia Rubinsky — Villa-Lobos: Piano Music; Guia Pratico, Albums 10 and 11; Suite Infantil Nos. 1 and 2

- Andrés Díaz — Bach: Cello Suites
- Ricardo Kanji and Rosana Lanzelotte — Cavaleiro Neukomm Criador Da Música De Câmara No Brasil
- Ricardo Morales and the Pacifica Quartet — Concierto De Aniversario

Best Classical Contemporary Composition

Gabriela Lena Frank — "Inca Dances" (Manuel Barrueco and Cuarteto Latinoamericano)

- Orlando Jacinto Garcia — "Cuatro Asimetrias para el Cuarteto de Guitarras de Asturias entre Quatret" (Orlando Jacinto Garcia)
- Clarice Assad — "Danças Nativas" (Aquarelle Guitar Quartet)
- Roberto Sierra — "Variations On a Souvenir" (Roberto Sierra)
- Alfonso Fuentes — "Voces del Barrio" (Kathleen Jones)

=== Recording Package ===
Best Recording Package

Alejandro Ros — Cantora 1 (Mercedes Sosa)

- Rubén Scaramuzzino — Andrés: Obras Incompletas (Andrés Calamaro)
- 7Potencias.Net — Aocaná (Ojos de Brujo)
- Juan Gatti — Bosegrafía (Miguel Bosé)
- Jesús Sarabia — Dramas y Caballeros (Luis Ramiro)

=== Production ===
Best Engineered Album

Dani Espinet, Micky Forteza Rey, Jose Luis Molero, Jordi Solé and Tom Backer — Orquesta Reciclando (Jarabe de Palo)

- Bori Alarcón, Alfonso Espadero and Javier García — Despertar (India Martínez)
- Gabriel Pinheiro and Ricardo Dias — Dois Mundos (Scott Feiner & Pandeiro Jazz, produced by Scott Feiner and David Feldman (musician))
- Denílson Campos, Rodrigo Delacroix, Jr Tostoi and Ricardo Garcia — Labiata (Lenine)
- Renato Alsher, Fernando Aponte, Julio Berta, Marcos Cunha, Zé Guilherme, Caco Law, Alex Moreira, LC Varella and Carlos Freitas — Telecoteco (Paula Morelenbaum)

Producer of the Year

Cachorro López

- Aureo Baqueiro
- Sergio George
- J. Jiménez "Chaboli"
- José Lugo

=== Music video ===
Best Short Form Music Video

- **Calle 13 featuring Rubén Blades — "La Perla"**
- Ricardo Arjona — "Cómo Duele"
- Babasónicos — "Las Demás"
- Bebe — "Me Fui"
- Zoé — "Reptilectric"

Best Long Form Music Video

Roberto Carlos and Caetano Veloso — E A Música De Tom Jobim

- Gian Marco — En Vivo Desde El Lunario
- Draco Rosa — Teatro
- Ivete Sangalo — Pode Entrar: Multishow Registro
- Tempo — Free Tempo

=== Special awards ===
Lifetime Achievement Awards

- Cándido Camero
- Beth Carvalho
- Charly García
- Tania Libertad
- Marco Antonio Muñiz
- Juan Romero

Trustees Awards

- José Antonio Abreu
- Roberto Cantoral García

== Performers ==
- 01. — Intro — "Latin Grammy 2009" 00:39
- 02. — Laura Pausini — "En Cambio No" 04:00
- 03. — Pepe Aguilar — "Me Vas A Extrañar"
- 04. — Luis Fonsi — "Nada Es Para Siempre / Aquí Estoy Yo / No Me Doy Por Vencido"
- 05. — Reik — "Inolvidable"
- 06. — Shaila Dúrcal And Mariachi Reyna De Los Angeles — "Tatuajes" 05:06
- 07. — Wisin & Yandel — "Te Siento / Abusadora"
- 08. — Calle 13 Featuring Rubén Blades And Mystere By Cirque du Soleil — "La Perla" 05:00
- 09. — David Bisbal And Luz Ríos — "Aire"
- 10. — Los Tucanes De Tijuana — "Se Fue Mi Amor"
- 11. — La Quinta Estación — "Me Dueles"
- 12. — Alejandro Sanz And Alicia Keys — "Looking For Paradise" 06:00
- 13. — Grupo Montéz de Durango Featuring Espinoza Paz — "Espero"
- 14. — Oscar D'León And Gilberto Santa Rosa — "Yo Quisiera / Yo La Agarro Bajando / Detalle / Que Manera De Quererte"
- 15. — Juan Gabriel — "Medley" 34:16
- 16. — Daniela Mercury — "Cidade / Rapunzel / Mas que nada / País Tropical / Mamãe Eu Quero / Aquarela do Brasil" 03:40

== Presenters ==
- Alejandra Guzmán — presented Best Norteño Album
- Eva Longoria and Alejandro Sanz — presented Record of the Year
- Milly Quezada and Johnny Ventura — presented Best Salsa Album
- Enrique Iglesias — presented People of the Year
- Charytín — introduced Wisin & Yandel
- David Bisbal and Kany García — presented Best New Artist
- Cucu Diamantes and Beto Cuevas — presented Best Regional Song
- Omara Portuondo and Pau Donés — presented Song of the Year
- Alexander Acha and Marlene Favela — presented Best Female Pop Vocal Album
- Víctor Manuelle and Stefanía Fernández — presented Best Urban Song
- Rubén Blades — presented the tribute to Mercedes Sosa
- Rosana, Gian Marco and Luis Enrique — presented Best Pop Album by a Duo/Group with Vocals
- Amaia Montero and Aarón Díaz — presented Best Contemporary Tropical Album
- Dulce María and Germán Montero — presented Best Rock Solo Vocal Album
- Juan Luis Guerra — presented Album of the Year

== Trivia ==
- The show marked the first time since 2000 where the same artist did not win both Record of the Year and Song of the Year.
- Omara Portuondo became the first Cuban artist who lives in Cuba to receive an award on stage. She was awarded Best Contemporary Tropical Album for her album, Gracias.
- Juan Gabriel has the record for the longest performance on the main show, clocking at more than 34 minutes.
