= Mattatracks =

- Born: Edgardo Matta; December 16, 1974 (age 51); Santurce, Puerto Rico, U.S.
- Genres: Urbano music, Reggae, Hip hop, World music.
- Occupations: Record producer, composer, songwriter
- Years active: 1998–present
- Website: https://mattatracks.com/

Edgardo Matta (born December 16, 1974), professionally known as Mattatracks, is a two-time GRAMMY and a six-time Latin GRAMMY award-winning record producer, composer, and songwriter.

In 2007 Mattatracks won his first GRAMMY award for his work in the production of Calle 13’s second record Residente o Visitante, recognized as the Best Latin Urban Album during the 50th Annual GRAMMY Ceremony.

Following this success Mattatracks produced Calle 13's third album, Los de Atrás Vienen Conmigo, which earned him his second GRAMMY in 2010 receiving the Best Latin Rock, Alternative Or Urban Album award. Los de Atrás Vienen Conmigo also won a total of five categories during the 10th Annual Latin GRAMMY Ceremony. Mattatracks’ work in this production was recognized winning three of those nominations: Album of the Year, Best Urban Music Album, and Record of the Year for the hit song No Hay Nadie Como Tú.

Mattatracks was also awarded three Latin GRAMMY in 2011 for his participation in the production of Calle 13's forth, and acclaimed, album: Entren Los Que Quieran. At the time, the album broke a record for Latin GRAMMY Nominations and holds the Guinness World Record for Most Latin GRAMMY Awards Won For A Single Album. This success earned Mattratracks three new accolades winning, for a second year in a row, Album of the Year, Best Urban Music Album, and Record of the Year, this time for the song Latinoamérica.

== Early life ==
Born on December 16, 1974, in Santurce, Puerto Rico, Mattatracks grew up in the vibrant and diverse cultural milieu of the Caribbean. This upbringing exposed him to a wide variety of music genres, cultures, and creative environments that would later prove instrumental in shaping his distinctive musical style.

== Music career ==
Over a career spanning more than two decades, Mattatracks has built a discography that includes collaborations with artists such as:Barrington Levy, Daddy Yankee, and Maluma, to name a few.

Mattatracks has received two GRAMMY and six Latin GRAMMY awards, but he has also collaborated in another award-winning music production. In 2003 Mattatracks worked assisting music producer, and long-time-collaborator, "Echo" Irizarri in the engineering, mixing, and production of Vico C's record En Honor a la Verdad, which won the Latin GRAMMY for Best Urban Album in 2004.

== Mattatracks production discography ==
Year	Artist	Album	Song(s)	Mattatracks' Role (credits)
2022	Mattatracks & Gammy	Bang Bang - Single	Bang Bang	Main Artist, Composer, Producer.
2021	Queen'D	Solo Dime - Single	Solo Dime	Mastering Engineer.
2020	Queen'D	Mas Allá De LAs Estrellas - Single	Mas Allá De LAs Estrellas	Remixer. Mastering Engineer.
2020	Queen'D	Somos Mujeres - Single	Somos Mujeres	Mastering Engineer.
2020	Queen'D	Un Milagro (feat. Salvador Zepeda) - Single	Un Milagro (feat. Salvador Zepeda)	Mastering Engineer.
2020	Queen'D	Tú y Yo - Single	Tú y Yo	Mastering Engineer.
2018	J.Torres ft. Chingo Bling		No Flacas Allowed	Producer.
2018	Bachaco		De Otro Planeta	Producer.
2018	Ephniko	Agradecido	Agradecido	Mixing.
2018	Ephniko	Agradecido	Todos Los Días	Mixing.
2018	Ephniko	Agradecido	Kung Food	Mixing.
2018	Ephniko	Agradecido	La Vida Pasa	Mixing.
2018	Ephniko	Agradecido	Religion	Mixing.
2015	Maluma	Carnaval - Single	Carnaval	Mixing Engineer.
2015	Maluma	PB.DB. The Mixtape	Addicted	Mixing Engineer.
2013	Keymass & Bonche		Pequeña Sambea	Master Engineer.
2010	Calle 13	Entren Los Que Quieran	Intro	Mixing Engineer.
2010	Calle 13	Entren Los Que Quieran	Baile de los Pobres	Mixing Engineer.
2010	Calle 13	Entren Los Que Quieran	La Vuelta al Mundo	Mixing Engineer.
2010	Calle 13	Entren Los Que Quieran	La Bala	Mixing Engineer.
2010	Calle 13	Entren Los Que Quieran	Vamo' a Portarnos Mal	Mixing Engineer, Recording Engineer.
2010	Calle 13	Entren Los Que Quieran	Latinoamérica (feat. Totó la Momposina, Susana Baca, & María Rita)	Mixing Engineer.
2010	Calle 13	Entren Los Que Quieran	Inter - En Annunakilandía	Mixing Engineer, Recording Engineer.
2010	Calle 13	Entren Los Que Quieran	Digo Lo Que Pienso	Mixing Engineer, Recording Engineer.
2010	Calle 13	Entren Los Que Quieran	Muerte en Hawaii	Mixing Engineer, Recording Engineer.
2010	Calle 13	Entren Los Que Quieran	Todo Se Mueve (feat. Seun Kuti)	Mixing Engineer, Recording Engineer.
2010	Calle 13	Entren Los Que Quieran	El Hormiguero	Mixing Engineer, Recording Engineer.
2010	Calle 13	Entren Los Que Quieran	Prepárame la cena	Mixing Engineer.
2010	Calle 13	Entren Los Que Quieran	Outro	Mixing Engineer.
2009	Omar Garcia	Omar Garcia	Bienvenida	Producer, Recording and Mixing Engineer.
2009	Omar Garcia	Omar Garcia	Quien Soy	Producer, Recording and Mixing Engineer.
2009	Omar Garcia	Omar Garcia	Otra Cosa	Producer, Recording and Mixing Engineer.
2009	Omar Garcia	Omar Garcia	Matriz	Producer, Recording and Mixing Engineer.
2009	Omar Garcia	Omar Garcia	Cucubano	Producer, Recording and Mixing Engineer.
2009	Omar Garcia	Omar Garcia	Vibra Buena	Producer, Recording and Mixing Engineer.
2009	Omar Garcia	Omar Garcia	Sal A Bailar	Producer, Recording and Mixing Engineer.
2009	Omar Garcia	Omar Garcia	Lo Mejor De Mi	Producer, Recording and Mixing Engineer.
2009	Omar Garcia	Omar Garcia	Sra. García	Producer, Recording and Mixing Engineer.
2009	Omar Garcia	Omar Garcia	ÍIdolos	Producer, Recording and Mixing Engineer.
2009	Omar Garcia	Omar Garcia	De Todo Un Poco	Producer, Recording and Mixing Engineer.
2009	Omar Garcia	Omar Garcia	Calle	Producer, Recording and Mixing Engineer.
2008	Calle 13	Los de Atrás Vienen Conmigo.	Intro: Crónica de un Nacimiento	Producer, Recording and Mixing Engineer.
2008	Calle 13	Los de Atrás Vienen Conmigo.	Que Lloren	Producer, Recording and Mixing Engineer.
2008	Calle 13	Los de Atrás Vienen Conmigo.	No Hay Nadie como Tú	Producer, Recording and Mixing Engineer.
2008	Calle 13	Los de Atrás Vienen Conmigo.	Gringo Latin Funk	Producer, Recording and Mixing Engineer.
2008	Calle 13	Los de Atrás Vienen Conmigo.	Ven y Critícame	Producer, Recording and Mixing Engineer.
2008	Calle 13	Los de Atrás Vienen Conmigo.	Esto con Eso	Producer, Recording and Mixing Engineer.
2008	Calle 13	Los de Atrás Vienen Conmigo.	Perla	Producer, Recording and Mixing Engineer.
2008	Calle 13	Los de Atrás Vienen Conmigo.	Electro Movimiento	Producer, Recording and Mixing Engineer.
2008	Calle 13	Los de Atrás Vienen Conmigo.	Intro Fiesta de Locos	Producer, Recording and Mixing Engineer.
2008	Calle 13	Los de Atrás Vienen Conmigo.	Fiesta de Locos	Producer, Recording and Mixing Engineer.
2008	Calle 13	Los de Atrás Vienen Conmigo.	de AtrásVienen Conmigo	Producer, Recording and Mixing Engineer.
2008	Calle 13	Los de Atrás Vienen Conmigo.	Tal Para Cual	Producer, Recording and Mixing Engineer.
2008	Calle 13	Los de Atrás Vienen Conmigo.	Interlude Rasta Irie Man	Producer, Recording and Mixing Engineer.
2008	Calle 13	Los de Atrás Vienen Conmigo.	Bienvenidos a Mi Mundo	Producer, Recording and Mixing Engineer.
2008	Calle 13	Los de Atrás Vienen Conmigo.	John el Esquizofrénico	Producer, Recording and Mixing Engineer.
2008	Calle 13	Los de Atrás Vienen Conmigo.	Outro	Producer, Recording and Mixing Engineer.
2008	Varon	Caribbean Connection	Don't Turn Off The Light (feat. Barrington Levy)	Composer.
2008	Vico C	Caribbean Connection	Og (feat. T.O.K.)	Composer.
2007	Calle 13	Residente o Visitante	Intro	Mixing Engineer.
2007	Calle 13	Residente o Visitante	Tango del Pecado	Mixing Engineer.
2007	Calle 13	Residente o Visitante	La Fokin Moda	Mixing Engineer.
2007	Calle 13	Residente o Visitante	Sin Exagerar	Mixing Engineer, Recording Engineer.
2007	Calle 13	Residente o Visitante	Mala Suerte Con el 13	Mixing Engineer, Recording Engineer.
2007	Calle 13	Residente o Visitante	Llégale a Mi Guarida	Mixing Engineer.
2007	Calle 13	Residente o Visitante	Un Beso de Desayuno	Mixing Engineer.
2007	Calle 13	Residente o Visitante	Uiyi Guaye	Mixing Engineer.
2007	Calle 13	Residente o Visitante	Algo Con-Sentido	Mixing Engineer.
2007	Calle 13	Residente o Visitante	Pal Norte	Mixing Engineer.
2007	Calle 13	Residente o Visitante	La Cumbia de los Aburridos	Mixing Engineer, Recording Engineer.
2007	Calle 13	Residente o Visitante	A Limpiar el Sucio	Mixing Engineer.
2007	Calle 13	Residente o Visitante	El Avión Se Cae	Mixing Engineer.
2007	Calle 13	Residente o Visitante	La Crema	Mixing Engineer.
2007	Calle 13	Residente o Visitante	La Era de la Copiaera	Mixing Engineer.
2004	Daddy Yankee	Barrio Fino	Saber Su Nombre	Producer.
2003	Vico C	En Honor A La Verdad	Intro	Assistant Engineer, Mixing, Production Assistant.
2003	Vico C	En Honor A La Verdad	En Honor a la Verdad	Assistant Engineer, Mixing, Production Assistant.
2003	Vico C	En Honor A La Verdad	Capicu	Assistant Engineer, Mixing, Production Assistant.
2003	Vico C	En Honor A La Verdad	5 De Septiembre (Acoustic Version)	Assistant Engineer, Mixing, Production Assistant.
2003	Vico C	En Honor A La Verdad	Flowowow	Assistant Engineer, Mixing, Production Assistant.
2003	Vico C	En Honor A La Verdad	Para Mi Barrio (feat. Tony Touch and D'Mingo)	Assistant Engineer, Mixing, Production Assistant.
2003	Vico C	En Honor A La Verdad	En la Barberia	Assistant Engineer, Mixing, Production Assistant.
2003	Vico C	En Honor A La Verdad	Superman	Assistant Engineer, Mixing, Production Assistant.
2003	Vico C	En Honor A La Verdad	Masacote	Assistant Engineer, Mixing, Production Assistant.
2003	Vico C	En Honor A La Verdad	El Bueno, El Malo y El Feo (feat. Eddie Dee and tego Calderón)	Assistant Engineer, Mixing, Production Assistant.
2003	Vico C	En Honor A La Verdad	Yerba Mala	Assistant Engineer, Mixing, Production Assistant.
2003	Vico C	En Honor A La Verdad	Mi Forma de Tiradera	Assistant Engineer, Mixing, Production Assistant.
2003	Vico C	En Honor A La Verdad	5 De Septiembre [Reggaeton Mix]	Assistant Engineer, Mixing, Production Assistant.
2003	Vico C	En Honor A La Verdad	Para Mi Barrio [Reggaeton Mix] (feat. Tony Touch and D'Mingo)	Assistant Engineer, Mixing, Production Assistant.
2003	Vico C	En Honor A La Verdad	El Bueno, El Malo y El Feo [Reggaeton Mix]	Assistant Engineer, Mixing, Production Assistant.
