= Cuci =

Cuci may refer to:

- Cuci, Mureș, a commune in Mureș County, Romania
- Cuci, a village in Bozieni, Neamț, Romania
- Cuci, a village in Fârtățești Commune, Vâlcea County
- Cuci (film), a 2008 Malaysian film
- Cuci Amador Electro funk singer
- Nickname for Brunello Cucinelli
