= Estadio Padre Ernesto Martearena =

Football stadium in Salta, Argentina

Father Ernesto Martearena Stadium
- Estadio Padre Ernesto Martearena

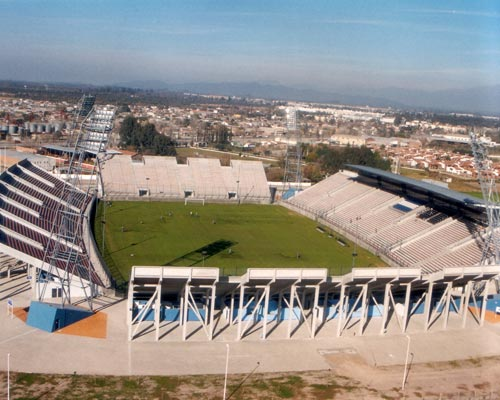
- Aerial view of the stadium in 2014
- Interactive map of Father Ernesto Martearena Stadium
- Full name: Estadio Padre Ernesto Martearena
- Address: Avenida Juan Pablo II; Salta; Argentina
- Coordinates: 24°49′15″S 65°25′9″W
- Owner: Salta Province
- Operator: Government of Salta
- Capacity: 21,000
- Surface: Grass
- Field size: 105 x 70

Construction
- Opened: January 5, 2001; 25 years ago
- Architect: MSGSSV Studio
- Builder: Riva S.A.
- Project manager: OSM Arquitectura

Tenants
- Juventud Antoniana; Central Norte; Argentina national rugby team (2005–19)

Estadio Padre Ernesto Martearena (English: Father Ernesto Martearena Stadium) is a football stadium in Salta, Argentina, built for the 2001 FIFA World Youth Championship. It holds 20,408 people and is now the home ground of Juventud Antoniana and Central Norte, both playing currently in the country's third level.

While it is mainly used for football, the Argentina national rugby team has also played at Padre Martearena stadium. The structure is formed by four sectors, two sides tiers with capacity for 6,000 each one, and two main grandstands with 4,000. They are also formed by 22 modules of 900 spectators each.

The stadium was named after Father Ernesto Martearena (1944–2001), a priest who served in the province and was recognised for his social work. Martearena was killed after being assaulted by two men in his own house.

== Football ==
=== FIFA Youth World Cup ===
During the 2001 FIFA World Youth Championship this stadium hosted the Group E, conformed by Netherlands, Costa Rica, Ecuador and Ethiopia, and the round of 16 match between Costa Rica and Czech Republic.

Date	Time (UTC−03)	Group	Team #1	Res.	Team #2	Attend.
18 June	14:00	Group E	Ecuador	2–1	Ethiopia	14,000
18 June	16:45	Group E	Netherlands	1–3	Costa Rica	14,000
21 June	14:00	Group E	Costa Rica	3–1	Ethiopia	10,000
21 June	16:45	Group E	Ecuador	1–1	Netherlands	14,000
24 June	14:00	Group E	Ecuador	0–1	Costa Rica	15,000
24 June	16:45	Group E	Ethiopia	2–3	Netherlands	17,000
28 June	14:00	Round of 16	Costa Rica	1–2	Czech Republic	13,000

=== Copa América ===
It also hosted two Group B matches for the 2011 Copa America:

Date	Time (UTC−03)	Group	Team #1	Res.	Team #2	Attend.
July 9	18:30	Group B	Venezuela	1–0	Ecuador	12,000
July 13	19:15	Group B	Paraguay	3–3	Venezuela	18,000

=== Other football events ===
The stadium hosted for the first time an international club competition when Boca Juniors played its home matches for the round of 16 and quarter finals of the 2004 Copa Sudamericana. For the 2005 and 2006 editions of the cup, Boca Juniors used this stadium only for the round of 16 home matches.

Since 2002 Salta hosts one of the many annual Summer Tournaments and has hosted several matches for the Copa Argentina on its 2011–12, 2013–14 and 2014–15 editions.

== Rugby ==
=== Argentina ===
Argentina national rugby union team, Los Pumas, has played several test matches here and several Rugby Championship matches.

Date	Result	Rival	Tournament/Trophy
June 11, 2005	35–21	Italy	Argentina v Italy test series
June 13, 2009	24–22	England	Argentina v England test series
June 8, 2013	3–32	England	Argentina v England test series
August 9, 2013	58–12	(Australia) NSW Barbarians	2013 Rugby Championship Warm-ups
August 9, 2014	31–33	South Africa	2014 Rugby Championship
May 5, 2015	28–23	United States	Test match
August 27, 2016	26–24	South Africa	2016 Rugby Championship
August 26, 2017	23–41	South Africa	2017 Rugby Championship
October 6, 2018	34–45	Australia	2018 Rugby Championship
August 10, 2019	13–46	South Africa	2019 Rugby Championship

== Shows ==
Some of the artists that have performed at the Padre Martearena Stadium are Indio Solari (2009 and 2011), Wisin & Yandel (2010), Calle 13 (2011), Shakira (2011), Ricardo Arjona (2014), Violetta (2015), Ricky Martin (2016) and Soy Luna (2017 and 2018).

== See also ==
- List of football stadiums in Argentina
- Lists of stadiums

Preceded by various venues in Venezuela	Copa América; Venue; 2011	Succeeded by various venues in Chile
