= Los de Atrás Vienen Conmigo =

Studio album by Calle 13
- Released: October 21, 2008
- Recorded: 2008
- Genres: Hip hop, Latin, urban
- Label: Sony Music Latin
- Producers: René Pérez, Eduardo Cabra

Calle 13 chronology
| Residente o Visitante (2007) | Los de Atrás Vienen Conmigo (2008) | Entren Los Que Quieran (2010) |

Singles from Los de Atrás Vienen Conmigo
- 1. "No Hay Nadie Como Tú" Released: August 22, 2008; 2. "Electro Movimiento" Released: October 13, 2008; 3. "La Perla" Released: April 9, 2009; 4. "Fiesta de Locos" Released: August 28, 2009

Los de atrás vienen conmigo (English: The Ones Behind Are Coming with Me) is the third studio album by Puerto Rican alternative hip hop band Calle 13 and was released on October 21, 2008, by Sony Music Latin. This album is a bit more colorful than the previous, although dark humor continues to be the tone. The album has a fusion of rhythms the band discovered during their visits to several countries. They fuse rhythms of 'cumbia villera' native to Argentina, and rhythms of Balkan music. The album features collaborations with Rubén Blades, Café Tacuba, and Afrobeta. It won Best Latin Rock, Alternative or Urban Album at the 52nd Annual Grammy Awards and five Latin Grammys including Album of the Year at the 10th Annual Latin Grammy Awards.

== Background ==
Calle 13's self-titled debut album (2005) sold nearly 250,000 copies in the United States, but its darker follow-up, 2007's Residente o Visitante, sold just under 100,000 copies, despite receiving positive reviews and winning Latin Grammy Awards for Best Urban Music Album and Best Urban Song. The record garnered controversy for its religious and sexual overtones; vocalist/lyricist Residente reflected, "The problem with Residente o Visitante wasn't a bad word here or there, but the ideas. You can't erase an idea."

== Recording ==
The album was recorded from July to August 2008 in various studios around the American continent including Playbach Studio in San Juan, Puerto Rico, Circle House Studio and Songo Sound Recording Facilities in Miami, Florida, Circo Beat Studios in Buenos Aires, Argentina, Warner Chapell Brasil in Rio de Janeiro, Brazil, and Alfano Music in Panama City, Panama. It was mixed in the Circle House studio by Ivan Gutierrez and Edgardo "Mattatracks" Matta and mastered in Zeitgeist Recording Studios in Long Island City, New York.

== Composition ==
=== Music ===
For "La Perla", Visitante employed samba rhythms mixed with elements of the Uruguayan candombe genre in order to achieve an "old school and folkloric" sound. The bass is provided by a surdo, a type of Brazilian bass drum commonly used in samba reggae music. "Electro Movimiento", which features Miami-based duo Afrobeta, has been described as an "'80s freestyle throwback jam" featuring electronic sounds. Colombian singer-songwriter Juanes plays guitar on "Esto Con Eso", although Jason Birchmeier of Allmusic notes that "you wouldn't know if not for the liner note credits, as there's so much else going on in the song musically."

== Reception ==
=== Chart performance ===
The album became a major success on the Billboard 200, peaking at #89. This is their second consecutive album to chart on the Top 100 of the Billboard 200 (Residente o Visitante; #52). It also became a Top 5 success on the Billboard Top Latin Albums chart, peaking at #3. Following the Latin Grammy Awards of 2009, which the band won Album of the year, sales increased 134% and the album re-entry at 74. As of 2010, it had sold over 54,000 copies in the United States.

=== Critical reception ===
Professional ratings
Review scores
| Source | Rating |
|---|---|
| Allmusic | 4/5 stars |
| Billboard | (positive) |
| Robert Christgau | (B+) |

Jason Birchmeier of Allmusic gave Los de Atrás Vienen Conmigo four out of five stars and called the album "a step forward for Calle 13...toward a fearlessly experimental style of urban music unlike anything else out there at the time of its release." He praised the record's musical diversity and felt that many of the collaborative songs were highlights. Phil Freeman of The Village Voice also enjoyed the musical variety, deeming the album a "genre-redefining—if not genre-shattering—triumph" that combines "the fun of the debut with the sonic adventurism of the follow-up." Jon Pareles of The New York Times referred to Residente as "a visionary", and opined that "Few hip-hop or urban acts, in any language, match so much ambition to so much fun."

== Awards ==
The album was nominated in five categories for the 2010 Latin Grammy Awards, winning all of them, including 'Album of the Year', 'Best Urban Album', 'Record of the Year' and 'Best Alternative Song' for the hit single "No Hay Nadie Como Tu" along with Café Tacuba, as well as 'Best Music Video (in Short Format)' for "La Perla" featuring salsa legend Rubén Blades.

== Track listing ==
1. "Intro / Crónica De Un Nacimiento" (E. Abraham) - 1:35
2. "Que Lloren" (E. Cabra) — 4:39
3. "No Hay Nadie Como Tú (Featuring Café Tacuba)" (R. Ortega, E. Arroyo, J. Arroyo, R. Pérez, E. Cabra) — 4:48
4. "Gringo Latin Funk" (E. Cabra) — 4:16
5. "Ven y Critícame" (R. Arcuate, E. Cabra) — 4:45
6. "Esto Con Eso" (E. Cabra) — 4:09
7. "La Perla (Featuring La Chilinga & Rubén Blades)" (E. Cabra) — 7:00
8. "Electro Movimiento (Featuring Cuci Amador)" (R. Arcuate, E. Cabra) — 3:16
9. "Intro Fiesta de Locos" (E. Cabra) — 0:18
10. "Fiesta de Locos" (E. Cabra) — 4:27
11. "Los de Atrás Vienen Conmigo (Featuring La Banda Escolar De Aibonito)" (R. Arcuate, E. Cabra) — 3:36
12. "Tal Para Cual (Featuring PG-13)" (E. Cabra) — 3:47
13. "Interlude (Irie Rasa Man)" (E. Cabra) — 0:22
14. "Bienvenidos A Mi Mundo" (R. Arcuate, E. Cabra) — 3:57
15. "John, el Esquizofrénico" (R. Arcuate, E. Cabra) — 4:34
16. "Outro" (E. Cabra) — 0:47

iTunes Bonus Track Version

17. "Combo Imbécil (Featuring Vicentico)" (L. Bulacio, D. Ramírez, E. Cabra) — 4:36

Zune Bonus Track Version

18. "Pal' Norte (Don Cheto Mix) (Featuring Orishas & Don Cheto)" — 4:23
19. "Japón" — 4:00

=== Chart positions ===
| Chart (2009) | Peak position |
|---|---|
| Argentinian Albums(CAPIF) | 4 |
| Ecuadorian Albums (Musicalisimo) | 17 |
| US Billboard 200 | 89 |
| US Billboard Top Latin Albums | 3 |
| US Billboard Top Rap Albums | 19 |
| Venezuelan Albums (Recordland) | 20 |

== Awards ==
=== Latin Grammy Awards ===
The album won the following 2010 Latin Grammy Awards:

- Record of the Year - "No Hay Nadie Como Tú" featuring Café Tacuba
- Album of the Year - Los de Atras Vienen Conmigo
- Best Urban Music Album - Los de Atras Vienen Conmigo
- Best Alternative Song - "No Hay Nadie Como Tú" featuring Café Tacuba
- Best Short Form Music Video - "La Perla" featuring Ruben Blades

=== Grammy Awards ===
The album won the following at the 2011 Grammy Awards:

- Best Latin Rock, Alternative Or Urban Album
