= Electro Movimiento =

Single by Calle 13 featuring Afrobeta

from the album Los de Atrás Vienen Conmigo
- Released: September 23, 2008 (digital); February 7, 2010 (radio)
- Recorded: 2008
- Genre: Latin freestyle, hip hop, Latin
- Length: 3:16
- Label: Sony BMG
- Songwriters: Cuci Amador, Edgardo Matta, Eduardo Cabra, Ivan Gutierrez, Rafael Arcaute, René Perez
- Producers: René Pérez, Eduardo Cabra

Calle 13 featuring Afrobeta singles chronology
"No Hay Nadie Como Tú" (2008)	"Electro Movimiento" (2008)	"La Perla" (2009)

"Electro Movimiento" (English: Electric Movement) is the second single by Puerto Rican hip hop band Calle 13 from their third studio album Los de Atrás Vienen Conmigo and was released on September 23, 2008, by Sony BMG.

== Background ==
The song is freestyle influenced, similar to pop-dance music of the 1980s. It is also R&B influenced, especially in the chorus. In the lyrics, the song makes several pop culture references, ones such as traveling back to the 1980s to the time when Madonna was a virgin and John Travolta was spinning his dance moves, going back to a decade of stability and a generation of dancers that would have been electrified by Calle 13. It also calls dancers to mix drugs with alcohol, and to act like rock stars Axl Rose and Slash, when Residente shouts: "Welcome to the Jungle, Let's Get Ready to Rumble!"

== Track listing ==
US iTunes Store Digital Download

1. "Electro Movimiento" (3:16)

== Charts ==
Chart (2008–10)	Peak position
Colombia (EFE)	5
El Salvador (EFE)	5
Mexico (Billboard Mexican Airplay)	17
Mexico (Billboard Espanol Airplay)	10
US Latin Rhythm Airplay (Billboard)	11
