= David Cavazos =

Mexican singer-songwriter (born 1985)

- Born: April 19, 1985 (age 40)
- Origin: Monterrey, Mexico
- Genres: Latin Pop, Soul
- Occupation: Singer-songwriter
- Label: Warner Music Mexico
- Website: www.davidcavazos.com.mx

David Cavazos (born April 19, 1985, in Monterrey, Nuevo León) is a Mexican singer-songwriter.

David Cavazos began composing music at the age of eighteen and later signed with Warner Music Mexico, music label in which he found the support he needed to begin a solo career. He recorded his self-titled debut album in 2007 and released it on May 13, 2008, in Mexico. Cavazos' first single Bruja Hada became one of the most requested songs on Mexican radio.
