= Orquesta Reciclando =

Studio album by Jarabe de Palo
- Released: May 15, 2009
- Recorded: June 9–12, 2008
- Genre: Latin, rock
- Length: 65:58
- Label: Tronco

Jarabe de Palo chronology
Adelantando (2007)	Orquesta Reciclando (2009)	¿Y Ahora Qué Hacemos? (2011)

Orquesta Reciclando is the eighth studio album recorded by Spanish rock group Jarabe de Palo released on May 15, 2009. The album won the Latin Grammy Award for Best Engineered Album and was nominated for Best Pop Album by a Duo or Group with Vocals.

== Track listing ==
No.	Title	Length
1.	"Dueño de Mi Silencio"	4:22
2.	"La Flaca"	5:10
3.	"El Lado Oscuro"	4:07
4.	"El Bosque de Palo Cantamañanas"	3:46
5.	"Grita"	5:55
6.	"Depende"	3:52
7.	"Agua"	4:14
8.	"Dos Días en la Vida"	5:10
9.	"De Vuelta y Vuelta"	4:20
10.	"Mamá"	3:20
11.	"Duerme Conmigo"	3:30
12.	"Bonito"	4:19
13.	"Pura Sangre"	3:19
14.	"Déjame Vivir"	3:13
15.	"A Tu Lado"	3:29
16.	"Mucho Más, Mucho Mejor"	3:52
