= B-Side Players =

American band

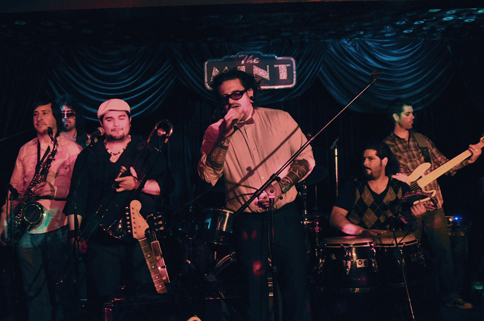
- B-Side Players performing in 2009

Background information
- Origin: San Diego, California, U.S.
- Genres: Funk-rock, Latin Alternative
- Years active: 1994–present
- Labels: Concord, Universal
- Members: Karlos "Solrak" Paez, Damian DeRobbio, Luis "The General" Cuenca, Victor Tapia
- Website: thebsideplayers.com

B-Side Players is an American band formed in 1994. The band incorporates the sounds of Cuba, Jamaica, Mexico and Brazil with the funk, rock, jazz and hip-hop rhythms of their homeland. The band also drops a bit of Cumbia, gritty street Samba, Son Montuno and Jarocho into the mix. Described as War meets Lenny Kravitz by way of Ben Harper, the players have expanded their sound by playing with the likes of Harper, Ozomatli, The Wailers, James Brown, War and some of Cuba's best bands. They are signed to Jazz label Concord Music Group.

Karlos "Solrak" Paez, the man behind the B-Side Players, grew up in a musical family. His father Ezequiel Paez is a trombone player and musical arranger who spent 17 years in Los Moonlights from Tijuana and 10 years in La Banda Del Recodo.

== Discography ==
- Renacimiento (1997)
- Culture of Resistance (1999)
- Movement (2001)
- Maiz (2002)
- Fire In The Youth (2007)
- Radio Afro Mexica (2009)
- Revolutionize (2012)

== Current and Former Members ==
- Karlos "Solrak" Paez - vocals, guitar (founding member)
- Sergio Hernández - bass (founding member)
- Damian DeRobbio - bass
- Paul Hernández - guitar
- Luis “The General” Cuenca - cymbals, drums, percussion and vocals
- Reagan Branch - Sax
- Vykki Milliman - flute
- Robert Sánchez - keyboard
- Josh Hernández - drums
- Joaquin Hernández - drums
- Gerry Guevara - bass
- Emmanuel Alarcon - lead guitar, cuatro puertorriqueño, vocals
- Aldo Perretta - charango, tres cubano, jarana veracruzana, ronrroco, cuatro venezolano, kena, zampoña
- Russ Gonzales - tenor sax
- Beto Perretta - drums, vocals
- Mike Benge - Trombone
- Ryan Moran - drums
- Michael Cannon - drums
- Camilo Moreno - congas and percussion
- Jamal Siurano - alto sax
- Kevin Nolan - trombone, trumpet
- Andy Krier - keyboards
- Omar Lopez - bass
- josiah McGinley - Sax
- Giovanni Mejia- Guitar
- Fabio Alejo Rojas - Keyboards
