= La Perla (Calle 13 song) =

Single by Calle 13 featuring La Chilinga and Rubén Blades

from the album Los de Atrás Vienen Conmigo
- Released: April 9, 2009
- Recorded: 2008
- Genre: Latin, alternative hip hop, samba
- Length: 6:56
- Label: Sony BMG
- Songwriters: Eduardo Cabra, Rene Perez, Rubén Blades
- Producers: René Pérez, Eduardo Cabra

Calle 13 featuring La Chilinga and Rubén Blades singles chronology
"Electro Movimiento" (2009)	"La Perla" (2009)	"Fiesta de Locos" (2009)

Rubén Blades singles chronology
"La Perla" (2009)	"Hoy Es Domingo" (2015)

"La Perla" (English: The Pearl) is the third single by alternative rap band Calle 13 taken from their third studio album Los de Atrás Vienen Conmigo, released on April 9, 2009 by Sony BMG. The song is about the historical town of the same name, located astride the northern historic city wall of the Old San Juan and features Panamanian salsa singer Rubén Blades and samba group La Chilinga. A music video was made and released for this song. Calle 13 and Ruben Blades performed the song at the Latin Grammy Awards for 2009.

== Charts ==
Chart (2009)	Peak position
El Salvador (EFE)	1
US Latin Pop Airplay (Billboard)	39
