= Castle of San Sebastián =

- Castillo de San Sebastián (Spanish)
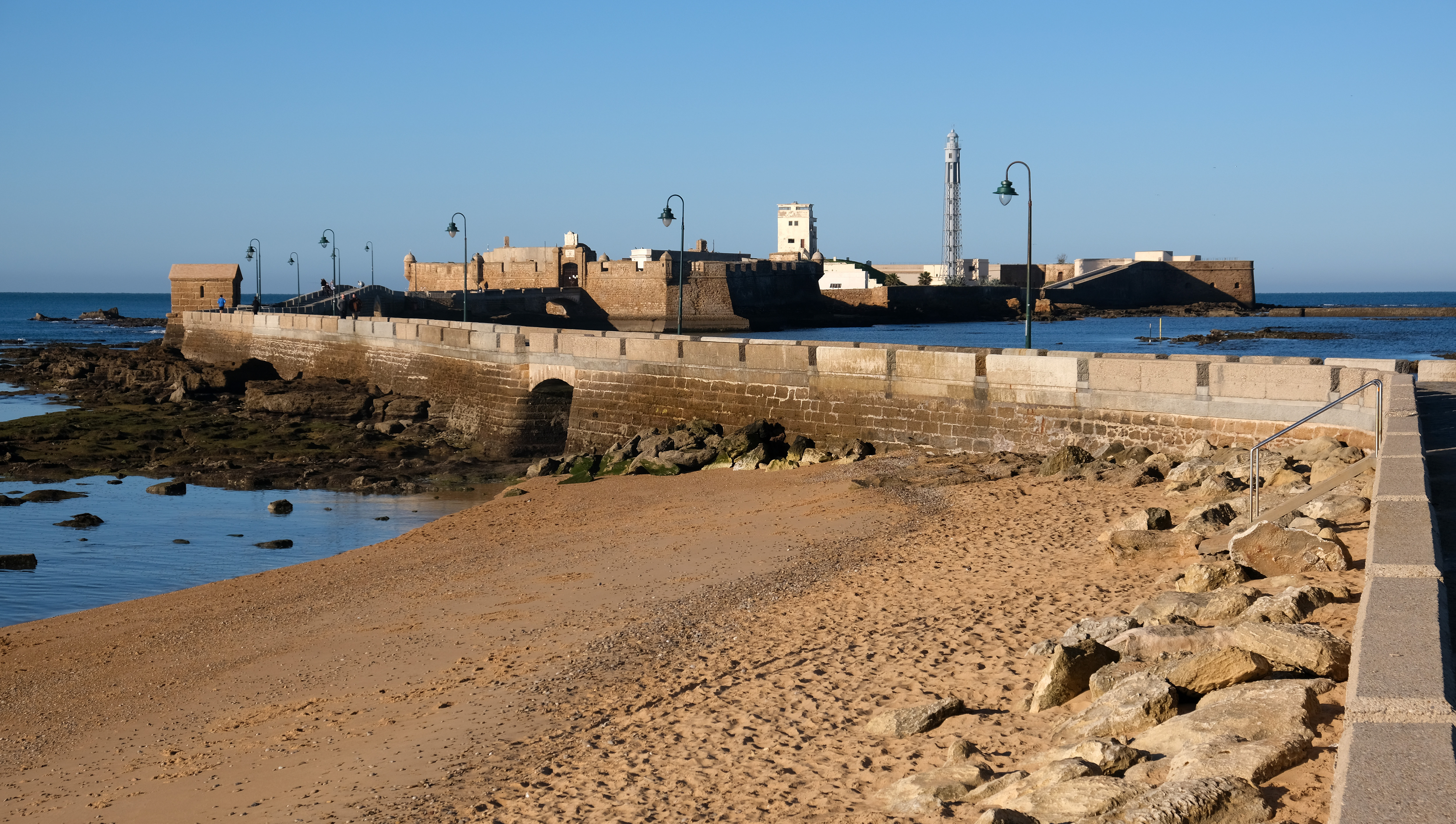

- Location within Spain
- 36.528106°N 6.315614°W
- Location: Cádiz, Spain

Spanish Cultural Heritage
- Official name: Castillo de San Sebastián
- Type: Non-movable
- Criteria: Monument
- Designated: 1993
- Reference no.: RI-51-0007575

The Castle of San Sebastián (Spanish: Castillo de San Sebastián) is a fortress located in Cádiz, Spain, at the end of La Caleta beach on a small island separated from the main city. It was declared Bien de Interés Cultural in 1993.

== History ==
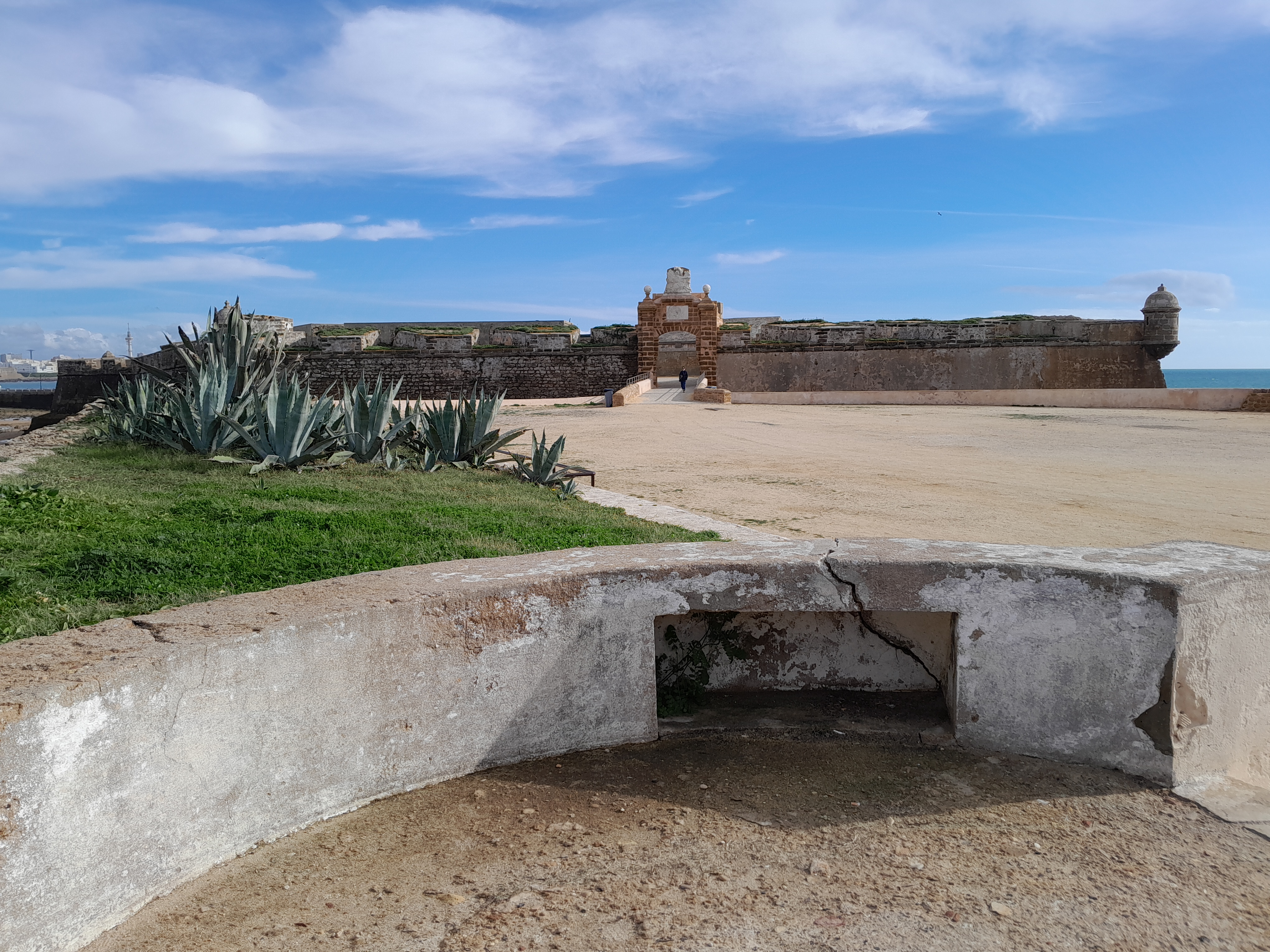
View of Castle of San Sebastian in 2025

According to the classical tradition of the location of the fortress, there was a Temple of Kronos, a Titan of the Greek gods, the father of Zeus, Poseidon, Hades, Hestia, Demeter and Hera.

In 1457, a chapel on the island was raised by a Venetian boat crew recovering from the plague.

In 1706, a castle was constructed, which resulted in a fortified enclosure of an irregular plane. It defended the northern flank of the city from attack. At the base of the lighthouse was a watchtower from the Muslim period.

In 1811, the Maltese navy arrived with the famous POW/rebel Junta of Buenos Aires, Juan Bautista Azopardo. He was housed in the fortress until 1815, when they suspected a leak and transferred him to the military prison in Ceuta.

In 1860, a levee was built to serve as a link between the island and the city.

The lighthouse has an iron structure designed by Rafael de la Cerda in 1908 and is the second electric-powered lighthouse in Spain. The tower rises to 41 meters above the sea.

The Castillo de San Sebastian was declared a cultural landmark in 1985.
