= Fiesta de Locos =

2009 single by Calle 13

Single by Calle 13

from the album Los de Atrás Vienen Conmigo
- Released: August 28, 2009
- Recorded: 2008
- Genre: Alternative hip hop
- Length: 4:27
- Label: Sony BMG
- Songwriters: René Pérez, Eduardo Cabra, Daniel Ramirez
- Producers: René Pérez, Eduardo Cabra

Calle 13 singles chronology
"La Perla" (2009)	"Fiesta de Locos" (2009)

"Fiesta de Locos" (English: Party of Crazy People) is the fourth single by Puerto Rican hip hop duo Calle 13 from their third studio album Los de Atrás Vienen Conmigo, released originally on September 30, 2008, as a promotional single but back later it decided that was the fourth single from the album.

== Inspiration ==
This song is directly influenced by Emir Kusturica, whose band Calle 13 had the chance to watch live in a concert in Buenos Aires. In an interview for Spanish newspaper El País, singer Residente claims that watching the band live was enough for him to "hallucinate"; both him and his brother Visitante claimed to have the basic structure of the song written later that night at the hotel they were staying.

== Lyrical content ==
The song is based around two people, possibly in a mental institution, and it is like having a party of crazy people. As it seems like on the single's cover, the duo appear to be patients at a mental institution.

== Music video ==
The music video was part of a Calle 13 concert, filmed on April 17 at the stadium GEBA on Buenos Aires, Argentina and premiered on August 28, 2009, in music channels.
