= Será (album) =

Studio album by Presuntos Implicados
- Released: September 16, 2008
- Recorded: Sep 2007 – May 2008
- Genre: Latin pop
- Label: Warner Bros.

Presuntos Implicados chronology
Postales (2005)	Será (2008)

Será is the 12th studio album recorded by Spanish band Presuntos Implicados released on September 16, 2008. The album was the first since the departure of Sole Giménez in 2006 and marked the debut of new singer Lydia.

== Track listing ==
This information adapted from Allmusic.

No.	Title	Writer(s)	Length
1.	"La Fiesta"	Nacho Mañó	3:29
2.	"Tú Como Estas?"	Juan Luis Giménez	3:39
3.	"No Digas Nada"	Nacho Mañó	3:53
4.	"Vuelves a Mí"	Juan Luis Giménez, Nacho Mañó	3:55
5.	"Dónde Voy Yo"	Juan Luis Giménez, Nacho Mañó	4:14
6.	"Ahora Que Sé lo Que Decir"	Juan Luis Giménez, Rosenvinge	3:37
7.	"Será"	Nacho Mañó	4:18
8.	"Acuérdate"	Juan Luis Giménez	4:10
9.	"Cuando Te Sonríe Julia"	Juan Luis Giménez, Nacho Mañó	3:58
10.	"Las Estaciones"	Nacho Mañó	3:48
11.	"7 Pisos"	Juan Luis Giménez	4:03
12.	"La Huella"	Nacho Mañó	3:55
13.	"Lloviendo en San Valentin"	Juan Luis Giménez	4:32
14.	"Milenios"	Nacho Mañó	2:11
