= No Hay Nadie Como Tú =

Single by Calle 13 featuring Café Tacuba

from the album Los de Atrás Vienen Conmigo
- Released: August 22, 2008
- Genre: Latin, alternative hip hop
- Length: 4:53 (Album Version); 4:16 (Radio Edit)
- Label: Sony BMG
- Songwriters: R. Ortega, E. Arroyo, J. Arroyo, René Pérez, Eduardo Cabra
- Producers: René Pérez, Eduardo Cabra

Calle 13 singles chronology
| "Un Beso de Desayuno" (2008) | "No Hay Nadie Como Tú" (2008) | "Electro Movimiento" (2009) |

Café Tacuba singles chronology
| "Esta Vez" (2008) | "No Hay Nadie Como Tú" (2008) | "Vámonos" (2008) |

"No Hay Nadie Como Tú" (English: There's No One Like You) is the first single by alternative-rap band Calle 13 taken from their third studio album Los de Atrás Vienen Conmigo, released on October 7, 2008 by Sony BMG. It features Mexican alternative rock group Café Tacuba. The single, a list song, is known for its mixture of different musical styles, typical of Calle 13's music. It's a blend of latin pop with rock and dance music. The song won the 2009 Latin Grammys for Record of the Year & Best Alternative Song.

== Music video ==
The video for "No Hay Nadie Como Tú" features Residente narrating a series of images, corresponding with what he's describing in song, from types of people to types of destruction. To date the video has received over 177 million views on the popular website YouTube.

== Chart performance ==
"No Hay Nadie Como Tú" entered on the Billboard Hot Latin Songs chart at #23, making it the most successful single from the album. The single was also a success on the Billboard "Latin Rhythm Airplay" chart, charting at #15.

=== Charts ===
| Chart (2008–09) | Peak position |
|---|---|
| Argentina (CAPIF) | 2 |
| Colombia (EFE) | 1 |
| Costa Rica (EFE) | 2 |
| El Salvador (EFE) | 1 |
| Honduras (EFE) | 1 |
| Mexico (Billboard Mexican Airplay) | 5 |
| US Hot Latin Songs (Billboard) | 23 |
| US Latin Rhythm Airplay (Billboard) | 15 |

== Certifications ==
| Region | Certification | Certified units/sales |
|---|---|---|
| Mexico (AMPROFON) | Gold | 30,000^{*} |
^{*} Sales figures based on certification alone.
