= Cuci Amador =

Puerto Rican singer

- Birth name: Cristina Elena Garcia
- Also known as: Cuci Amador
- Born: November 10, 1979 (age 45); San Juan, Puerto Rico
- Genres: Electro Funk
- Occupation: Singer
- Instrument(s): Keyboard, sampler, vocals
- Years active: August 2006–present
- Labels: –
- Website: Official Band Website

Cristina Elena Garcia known as Cuci Amador is an electro funk singer.

== Biography ==
Cristina Elena Garcia was born in San Juan, Puerto Rico on November 10, 1979 of Cuban parents. She is the singer of the musical group Afrobeta.

== Music ==
"That Thing" Single available on iTunes, includes "That Thing" and "Nighttime"

== Collaborations ==
- Co-writer and vocalist on Grammy award winning artist, Calle 13's most recent album "Los De Atras Vienen Conmigo" on the second single named "Electro Movimiento".
- Also appears in the recently released video for "Electro Movimiento"
- Also appeared on "2gether 4ever" on fellow Miami artist, Jose El Rey's first album, "A Little Strong".
- Also appeared as the female singer in the "We are here for you" commercials from Florida Blue Insurance.
