= Calle 13 (band) =

Puerto Rican hip-hop band

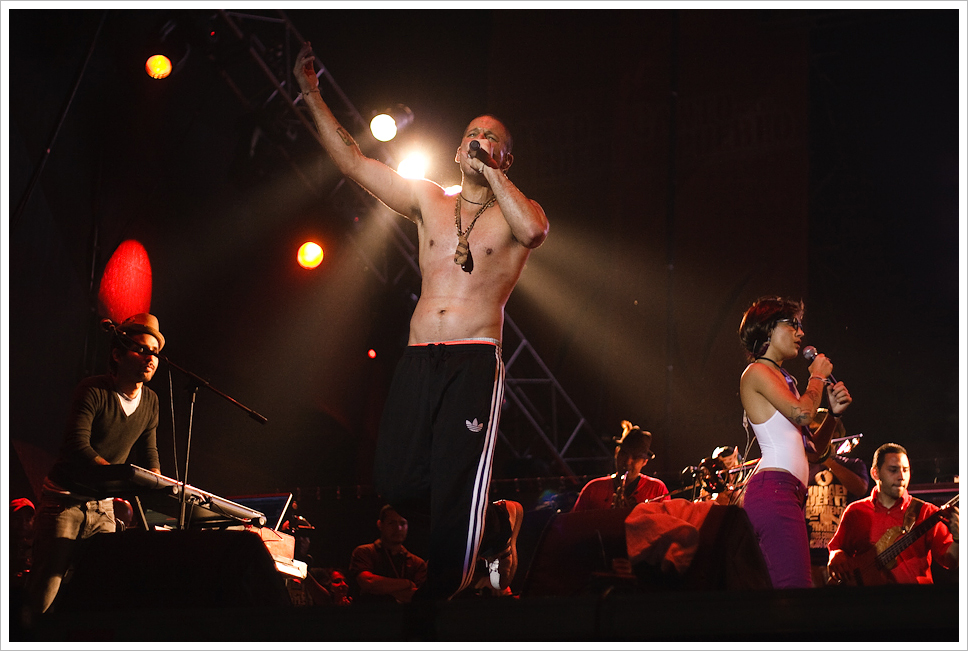
- Calle 13 performing in Venezuela

Background information
- Origin: Trujillo Alto, Puerto Rico
- Genres: Alternative hip-hop; world; conscious hip-hop; rap rock; indie rock; reggaeton (early)
- Years active: 2004–2015 (hiatus)
- Labels: El Abismo; White Lion; Sony
- Members: Residente; Visitante; iLe

Calle 13 was a Puerto Rican alternative hip-hop band formed by stepbrothers Residente (lead vocalist, songwriter) and Visitante (multi-instrumentalist, vocalist, beat producer), along with their half-sister iLe, also known as PG-13 (backing vocals).

Pérez and Cabra first were discovered by Elias De Leon. They were subsequently given a record deal with White Lion Records after leaving a demo with A&R Director Carlos "Karly" Rosario. After the song "Querido FBI" was released, the group gained attention in Puerto Rico. In 2005, Calle 13 released its eponymously titled debut album, which included the singles "Se Vale Tó-Tó" and "¡Atrévete-te-te!" and reached number 6 on the Billboard Top Latin Albums chart. In 2007, the group released its second album, Residente o Visitante, which experimented with a wide variety of genres and reached number 1 on the Top Latin Albums chart. The album helped the group gain success throughout Latin America and win three Latin Grammys. The group released its third album, Los de Atrás Vienen Conmigo, in 2008, which won Album of the Year at the 2009 Latin Grammy Awards. Calle 13 released Entren Los Que Quieran in November 2010 and its latest album, Multi Viral, on March 1, 2014.

Calle 13 is noted for its eclectic musical style, often using unconventional instrumentation in its music, which distances the group from the reggaeton genre. The band is also known for its satirical lyrics as well as social commentary about Latin American issues and culture. The stepbrothers are strong supporters of the Puerto Rican independence movement, a stance that has generated controversy. For their work, the group has won twenty-one Latin Grammy Awards, holding the record for the most Latin Grammy wins. They have also won three Grammy Awards.

== History ==
=== 2004–2005: early years ===
Residente and Visitante met when they were both two years old, when Residente's mother married Visitante's father. The family developed strong ties to the Puerto Rican arts community; Residente's mother, Flor Joglar de Gracia, was an actress in Teatro del Sesenta, a local acting troupe, while Visitante's father (who later became Residente's stepfather) is currently a lawyer, but at one time was a musician. The duo asserts that they lived a relatively comfortable lifestyle growing up, as Residente places himself in a group of Puerto Ricans who are "too poor to be rich and too rich to be poor." Although their parents later divorced, the stepbrothers remained close. When they were children, Visitante would visit his brother at the Calle 13 (13th Street) of the El Conquistador subsection of Trujillo Alto, Puerto Rico, every week. Since the subsection is a gated community, visitors were routinely asked "¿Residente o visitante?" ("Resident or visitor?") by a security guard when approaching the community's main gate. Therefore, Visitante would identify himself as a visitor, while Residente would have to insist that he was a resident to clear the gate. The pair named themselves Calle 13 after the street their family's house was on. Before living there, they lived at Calle 11.

Residente originally studied to be an accountant, and Visitante finished a computer science degree. An art course prompted Residente to pursue a career as a multimedia designer, and Visitante became a full-time musician and producer. Residente states that his degree in design has influenced his musical style: "What I used to do with my visual art is the same thing I do now with my lyrics. My songs are descriptive, very visual." Besides this, Residente was a fan of what was then called "underground rap" in Puerto Rico, and started to earn a reputation as a lyricist (Residente says, with some embarrassment, that his moniker at the time was "El Déspota", or "The Despot"). Meanwhile, Visitante participated in Bayanga, a rock and Brazilian batucada group. After Residente finished studying in Georgia at the Savannah College of Art and Design and earned a master of fine arts in animation, illustration, sequential art and film, he returned to Puerto Rico. Soon after, both of them started working on their music. They claim they initially did it as a joke, but they still managed to get some of their songs heard throughout Puerto Rico. They began recording music together in 2004, with the idea of hosting their work on a website, beginning with two demos ("La Tripleta" and "La Aguacatona"). Within a year, the duo began looking for a record label to distribute their music commercially. They decided to pursue a deal at White Lion Records, because Tego Calderón was on the label, whom the two admired.

=== 2005–2006: "Querido FBI" and Calle 13 ===
While their first album was being mixed, Filiberto Ojeda Ríos, leader of the Puerto Rican revolutionary group known as Los Macheteros, was killed in the course of arrest by the FBI.

Angered by the FBI's action, Residente wrote a song protesting against what had happened to Ojeda and asked his record label to allow the group to release it on the Internet through viral marketing through Indymedia Puerto Rico, an alternative news website.

Public controversy about the song's lyrics ensured immediate attention from mainstream media in Puerto Rico. The song, according to critics, "redefined what a reggaeton vocalist's relationship to Puerto Rico should be."

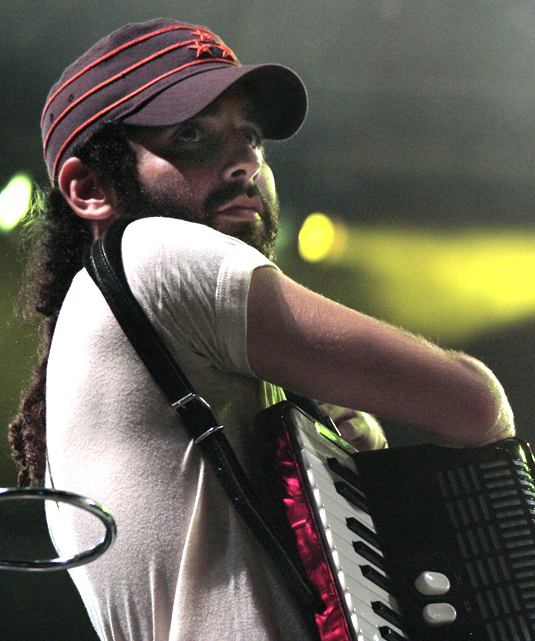
Visitante during Calle 13's first concert in Managua, Nicaragua.

Soon after this, the duo rose to fame in 2005 with two back-to-back hits on Puerto Rican radio stations: "Se Vale Tó-Tó" and "Atrevete-te-te!" Both songs were later included on their eponymously titled debut album, which was released on November 29, 2005.

After this rise to fame, the duo was sought by other reggaetón artists, and they collaborated with artists such as Julio Voltio in the song "Ojalai" (also known as "Chulin Culin Chunfly", whose name is a minor variation of a song written by Mexican comedy writer Roberto Gómez Bolaños, of whose comedic characters Residente is a fan—by citing the name, Gómez Bolaños is legally a co-author of the song,) and with the Three 6 Mafia in the remix, singing or co-writing songs. At the end of 2005, they finally released their album, which received great critical praise.

In 2006 the duo kept on working as they broke into a wider-music scene with at least two more smash hits that were played throughout Puerto Rico and U.S. Urban music radio and television stations, including the songs "Japón" ("Japan"), and "Suave" ("Soft/Slow"). The group had their first massive-venue concert on May 6, 2006, at the José Miguel Agrelot Coliseum in San Juan. They also toured Central and South America, playing "Atrévete-te-te" before an escola de samba in Venezuelan television, and also visiting, among others, Guatemala, Chile, Honduras and Colombia.

In light of the criticism directed towards the band, Calle 13 has become a cultural reference to be reckoned with in Puerto Rico. An example of this is the constant references made to the band and to Residente by satirical writer Fiquito Yunqué in the weekly pro-independence newspaper Claridad. Yunqué's columns sometimes feature Calle 13 lyrics as their titles, and Yunqué even introduced the band onstage at one of their live performances in Puerto Rico.

Acceptance of Calle 13's music even influenced the former Governor of Puerto Rico, Aníbal Acevedo Vilá who, in December 2005, admitted to listening to Calle 13 because his son had copied some of their songs to his iPod. Acevedo claimed that "songs such as Calle 13's were eye openers" to him. As a result, since the country had a chronic problem of people being unknowingly injured or killed by stray bullets fired to the air on New Year's Eve, Acevedo felt compelled to invite the duo to La Fortaleza and to have them record a song against shootings bullets in the air as a way of celebrating the holiday.

The single, "Ley De Gravedad" (Law of Gravity) was released as part of a public-service campaign for that matter. Some political adversaries of Acevedo dismissed this as a trick to ingratiate himself with Puerto Rican youth and pro-independence advocates, and was criticized by the local press due to the fact that an artist who seemingly promoted violence with their "Querido FBI" song was now supposed to be a role model for anti-violence. However, the campaign was thought to be effective in reducing the injured, from twelve (and one death) the previous year, to three the year the campaign was run, though many members of the artistic community contributed to this effort in separate campaigns.

=== 2007: Residente o Visitante ===
"Tango del Pecado"
The first single from Residente o Visitante, "Tango del Pecado", mixes the tango and reggaeton music genres. The song features Argentinean producer Gustavo Santaolalla and lyrically focuses on Residente's controversial relationship with former Miss Universe Denise Quiñones.

As the duo has risen to fame, other international artists of various genres have sought them. In 2006 and 2007, they recorded songs with Canadian Nelly Furtado and Spanish Alejandro Sanz. In their recent album, they feature contributions with such diverse groups like Orishas (a hip hop group whose members had emigrated from Cuba), Mexican Café Tacuba, Argentine Vicentico (from Los Fabulosos Cadillacs), and La Mala Rodríguez (from Spain), among others. On May 19, 2006, the band celebrated their first international concert, held in Panama City to a crowd of 5,000. During the summer of 2006 Calle 13 was featured on MTV's My Block: Puerto Rico. From September 15 – October 31 Calle 13 was Artist Speaking Tr3s on MTV Tr3s.

On November 2, 2006, the band won three Latin Grammys (Best New Artist; Best Urban Album; and Best Short Version Video, for the song "Atrévete-te-te"). They later filmed a video along with Julio Voltio for "Chulín Culín Chunfly", where Residente, dressed as a priest and later as Bruce Lee, is given a severe beating by a gang.

On April 24, 2007, their second album Residente o Visitante was released. Tracks in the album were partially recorded in Puerto Rico and while on tour in Colombia, Argentina and Venezuela. While recording the album, Residente and Visitante took a trip to South America to explore areas populated by Latin America's indigenous and African-descended minorities. The duo was strongly influenced by the experience; Visitante discovered and purchased several new musical instruments on the trip including a quijada, a charango and a bombo legüero, all of which were used on the duo's song "Lllegale a Mi Guarida".

Residente considered this album to be darker than the first, but also more introspective and biographical. The album garnered controversy for its sexual and religious overtones. As part of the album, Calle 13 filmed the video for their first single off the album, "Tango del Pecado", on February 25, 2007.

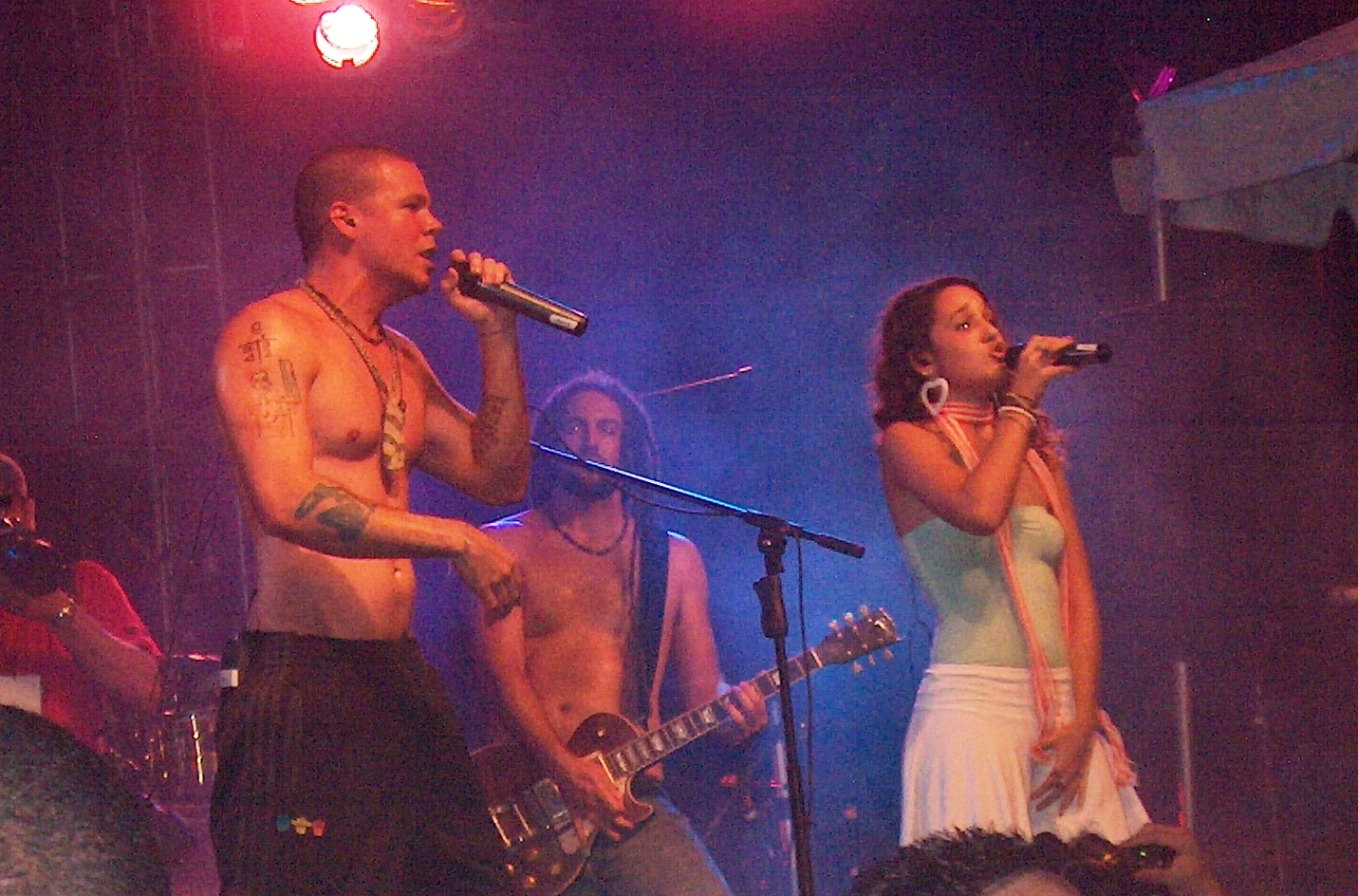
Residente and PG-13 during the 34th. Support to Claridad Festival, in San Juan, Puerto Rico, April 24, 2008

In May 2007, the duo performed at Vive Latino, and the public answered them by throwing beer bottles filled with urine. In 2010, when taking part of the same festival, they were less bitterly welcomed. In July 2007, Calle 13 teamed up with Julio Voltio to speak out against police brutality in Puerto Rico. After recording a song titled "Tributo a la Policía", Calle 13 distributed the single free on the streets in front of the Police Headquarters of San Juan.

On November 8, 2007, Calle 13, along with Orishas, performed the song "Pa'l Norte" at the 8th Annual Latin Grammy Awards, held at the Mandalay Bay Events Center in Las Vegas, Nevada. Their live performance featured the percussion/dance group Stomp. A troupe of dancers dressed in traditional Latin American garb and wearing bandannas in their faces (as if they were bandits) were also featured. Two members of the traditional Colombian folk cumbia band Los Gaiteros de San Jacinto, as well as members from an indigenous tribe local to the Gaiteros' hometown in northern Colombia, followed Residente to the stage at the beginning of the song. The subtext of the presentation was that Latin Americans were "invading the North" (the United States) and were there to stay.

Calle 13 earned two Latin Grammys later that night: "Best Urban Music Album" for Residente o Visitante and "Best Urban Song" for "Pal Norte". They were nominated for two other categories, the others being Best Short Form Music Video and Album of the Year. The Gaiteros de San Jacinto, who had also received a Grammy for their album Un Fuego de Sangre Pura, could only accept it when Calle 13 intervened to finance their trip to Las Vegas and obtain a temporary visa to visit the United States on their behalf.

A later tour of the Americas had Calle 13 perform to sell-out crowds in Colombia, Peru, Bolivia, Chile, Uruguay and Argentina. The band also performed in the United States, including an appearance at the New Orleans Jazz & Heritage Festival on April 27, 2008.

The band received all three possible audience acceptance awards when they performed at the 2008 Viña del Mar International Song Festival in Viña del Mar, Chile, taming the usually demanding crowd (traditionally nicknamed "El Monstruo", or "The Monster"—because of its fickleness—by Chilean media). They also performed to a sold-out crowd at Luna Park in Buenos Aires, Argentina. They finished their tour at the 34th Annual Claridad Support Festival in San Juan on April 24, 2008. Denise Quiñones joined the band onstage for their abbreviated song set.

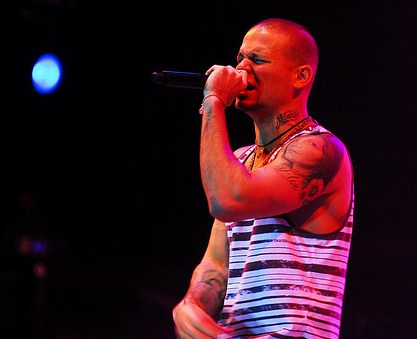
Residente performing on August 29, 2009.

=== 2008–2010: Los de Atrás Vienen Conmigo ===
On 2008, their "Atrévete-te-te" song was a featured track on the game Grand Theft Auto IV, playing in the lineup of the fictional San Juan Sounds radio station.

On October 9, 2008, Calle 13 participated in the "MTV Tr3s Pass Tour".

In an interview done during the production of their third album, Los de Atrás Vienen Conmigo, Calle 13 stated that the production would include songs discussing poverty. The duo also noted that the production would include cumbia villera and "sounds from Eastern Europe".

On October 21, 2008, the album was released. A series of songs off the album began to be released weekly as singles. Four singles were released: "Que Lloren" (September 16, 2008); "Electro Movimiento" (September 23, 2008); "Fiesta de Locos" (September 30, 2008); and "No Hay Nadie Como Tú", the latter featuring Café Tacuba. On August 11, 2009, the duo was invited to Ecuador by Rafael Correa's government, serving as guests in the local celebrations that commemorate the coup that began the Ecuadorian War of Independence. They played in Quito, performing in Estadio Olímpico Atahualpa for the first time, in an activity that included Nueva Canción: Argentina, León Gieco and speeches by Correa, Venezuelan president Hugo Chávez, deposed president of Honduras Manuel Zelaya, Cuban president Raúl Castro and Nicaraguan president Daniel Ortega. During the performance Residente said that he wished Puerto Rico could be an independent country such as Ecuador.

Pérez made a cameo appearance in the 2009 film Old Dogs, being cast to interpret a tattoo artist.

On October 15, 2009, Calle 13 won the Premios MTV Latinoamérica for Best Urban Artist. Pérez also served as host throughout the ceremony, using this exposure to insult Puerto Rican governor Luis Fortuño and comment about a civilian general strike that was organized earlier that day, held to protest the firing of more than 25,000 public employees by Fortuño's administration. Pérez was criticised after referring to Fortuño as an "hijo de la gran puta". The phrase is commonly translated as "son of a bitch", although the phrase places emphasis on the mother of the subject being a prostitute, which many found disrespectful to Fortuño's mother. Fortuño responded by saying "This individual disrespected all Puerto Rican women, all Puerto Rican mothers and the people of Puerto Rico in general."

Los de Atrás Vienen Conmigo was nominated in five categories for the 2009 Latin Grammy Awards winning all of them, including Album of the Year, Best Urban Album, Record of the Year and Best Alternative Song for the hit single "No Hay Nadie Como Tu" along with Café Tacuba, as well as Best Music Video (in Short Format) for "La Perla" featuring salsa artist Rubén Blades. The winners were announced on November 5, 2009, in a ceremony held at the Mandalay Bay Events Center in Las Vegas, Nevada.

On March 23, 2010, the band performed their first concert in Cuba, the event was held at the José Martí Anti-Imperialist Plaza before an estimated crowd that ranged between 500,000 and 900,000 fans. The band performed "No Hay Nadie Como Tú", "La Cumbia de los Aburridos", "Se Vale Tó-Tó", "La Hormiga Brava", "Un Beso de Desayuno", "Pa'l Norte", "Fiesta de Locos", "Querido FBI", "La Jirafa" and "Tango del Pecado", before adding "Electro Movimiento" and "Atrévete te-te" due to popular demand. During this event, Calle 13 received the international Cubadisco award from representatives of the Instituto Cubano de la Música (lit. Cuban Music Institute). The group originally planned to participate in Paz Sin Fronteras II, but were unable to acquire visas in time.

The band has also filmed a documentary. The film, Sin Mapa, is about their journeys through South America and the land's indigenous culture and art. The movie became available on iTunes and DVD on July 28, 2010.

=== 2010–2012: Entren Los Que Quieran ===
Calle 13 released their latest album, Entren Los Que Quieran, on November 22, 2010. The singles "Calma Pueblo" and "Vamo' a Portarnos Mal" have been released to the iTunes Store. Visitante explained that the title of the album means that "Everyone's invited to enter. If you don't want to, well don't." He also stated that the album continues to experiment with different styles of music, with collaborations with Omar Rodríguez-López from The Mars Volta on "Calma Pueblo", giving the song a "Beastie Boys vibe". He stated that there would also be influences from Bollywood and South American rhythms. The promotional tour for Entren Los Que Quieran featured over a hundred presentations in 2011, spanning most of Latin America and parts of Europe. Among the most notable being serving as the sole representation of Puerto Rico at the inauguration of the Community of Latin American and Caribbean States and their performance at the 2011 Viña del Mar Festival, where Calle 13 decided to go against the event's rules, refusing further awards beyond a "Silver Torch" in order to avoid further interruption, despite being the most clamored artist in that night. On November 19, 2011, the group offered a concert in El Salvador where the entrance gate was fully paid in rice and beans, the collected food was subsequently donated to flood victims in that country. Pérez also remixed an exclusive version of "El Hormiguero" for four-time world boxing champion Miguel Cotto, who used it in his entrance prior to a successful title defense on December 3, 2011.

Upon release, the music video for "Calma Pueblo" generated controversy for its violence and full-frontal nudity, which the band claims is a metaphor for self-liberation. The album received more nominations for the 12th Latin Grammy Awards than any other production that year. It went on to win nine categories in total "Album of the Year", "Best Urban Music Album" and "Producer of the Year" in general; "Best Urban Song" for "Baile de los Pobres"; "Best Tropical Song" for "Vamo' a Potarnos Mal"; "Best Short Form Music Video" for "Calma Pueblo"; "Song of the Year" and "Record of the Year" for "Latinoamérica". Following this ceremony, Calle 13 emerged as the artist or group with most awards won in the event with 19, besting Juanes' 17. This accomplishment also shattered several records, including "Most Honored Album", "Most Latin Grammies won in one night" and increased their leadership in the "Most Latin Grammies won by a group" category to 13 more than their closest competitors.

In the press conference that followed, the group was interviewed by journalist Elvis Castillo of VENFM regarding his support to some elements of the Latin American left-wing. The journalist, a member of the conservative Venezuelan opposition, cited the work of local cartoonist Edo, a sketch of one of Pérez's characteristic black shirts scribbled with the phrase A Calle 13: No es lo mismo ver la Revolución como Visitante que como Residente (lit. "To Calle 13: It is not the same to see the Revolution as a Visitor as it is as a Resident") to question a supposed sympathy for Chavismo. Pérez disregarded that notion, stating that "[Calle 13] does not support any president, because when we support any president we stop belonging to the people." On June 22, 2011, Calle 13 performed at The Pachamama Peace Festival and supported the project together with 8 Latin American embassies as the Godparent of the Pachamama Project.

On December 22, 2011, the group received the Medalla Ramón Emeterio Betances from the Ateneo Puertorriqueño, the oldest cultural institution in Puerto Rico, as part of their Puerto Rican Flag Day celebrations. In the event, Pérez was heralded as the "Roberto Clemente of modern music" by host Luis Gutierrez, only to respond that he was "merely another member of [the Puerto Rican people] who decided to express [his] message". However, he admitted that being recognized in his motherland held more weight than any other award received during his career.

=== 2013–present: Multi Viral and hiatus ===
On November 13, 2013, the group released the track and video "Multi Viral", which featured WikiLeaks founder Julian Assange and Palestinian singer Kamilya Jubran on vocals and Tom Morello on guitar.

In December 2013, they announced that their new album would be named Multi Viral and it would be followed by a Latin American tour, which saw the band performing in Paraguay, Uruguay, Chile, Venezuela, Colombia, Costa Rica and Mexico. The album was released through their new own label, El Abismo, since they decided not to continue their contract with Sony Music Latin. The tour unofficially began at the University of Puerto Rico, Río Piedras Campus in San Juan, where Calle 13 held an impromptu free concert on February 25, 2014. The event was announced only six days before and did not receive formal promotion. The concert, which featured interludes where the group opposed a revision in the UPR's enrollment fee and allowed a low income child to voice the concerns of his community, managed to attract an estimate of 50,000 fans. The event featured the live debut of "El Aguante", which opened the show. Despite recognizing that his political ideology conflicted with the inmovilist conservative ideals of governor Alejandro García Padilla, Pérez accompanied the same child to a reunion in La Fortaleza the following day.

In May 2014, the duo once again performed at Vive Latino. When they were playing "El Aguante", one spectator jumped onto the stage and tried to take Residente's microphone. Five security guards grabbed the invader and Residente tried to punch him. The duo later issued a statement (with a fan-made video of the incident) in which they say Residente's punch never actually hit the aggressor. They also included a video in which Residente is shown with the attacker sharing a drink and celebrating the fifth album.

Following the end of their Multi_Viral world tour, Residente and Visitante went separate ways to focus on personal projects - the former would see the release of his first solo effort, Residente, in March 2017. In October 2018, Visitante premiered his new musical project "Trending Tropics", a collaboration with Dominican singer Vicente García. Though at the time of his album's release some media outlets referred to Calle 13 as a defunct band, Residente had previously said on multiple occasions that the band is not over and is just taking a break.

== Musical style ==
"Un Beso de Desayuno"
"Un Beso de Desayuno" from Residente o Visitante features the band experimenting with bossa nova and electronica music. The song's electronic elements helped to create a "warped" sound.

"Calma Pueblo"
This song from Entren Los Que Quieran features "vicious" guitar work from Omar Rodríguez-López from The Mars Volta. Visitante compared the track to the Beastie Boys.

Although most people have labeled Calle 13's music as reggaeton, the band has tried to distance itself from the style. Indeed, Residente once admitted the group played reggaeton in their first album as way of gaining some initial popularity more easily, while assuring that the group has nothing against the genre. Visitante, being a professional musician, tries to fuse diverse styles in the group's songs. Early cuts featured elements from jazz, bossa nova and salsa, while recent songs feature cumbia, tango, electronica and others. In their recent tours around Latin America they have added different musical elements according to the place the band is playing in, yet many of their songs carry the traditional reggaeton "Dem Bow" beat such as in their hit "Tango del Pecado" and the remix to "Suave".

Singer Residente is reluctant to label their music in a specific genre, instead calling it plain urban style. In an interview with Ruben Blades, Rene mentioned that he is wary of making generic hip hop and traditional reggaeton. He added that even though he welcomes the "urbanity" of Hip Hop, he does not consider it to be an authentic Latin American musical expression. On the other hand, he believes that reggaeton has become generic and watered down with pop aesthetics. Calle 13 has maintained a healthy distance from the orthodoxy of reggaeton and both he and his brother justify it by saying that only three songs out of fifteen songs in their eponymous debut album, as well as four out of fifteen songs in their album Residente o Visitante, feature reggaetón beats. Residente said of the group's musical style "I love to mix things up, like on our song 'La Jirafa’. We have drumming from Brazil combined with the theme music from the film Amélie. It's a pretty song, a love song for a woman, but it's about Puerto Rico too. I think this why people like our music, because – sexually speaking or politically speaking – it's just very genuine."

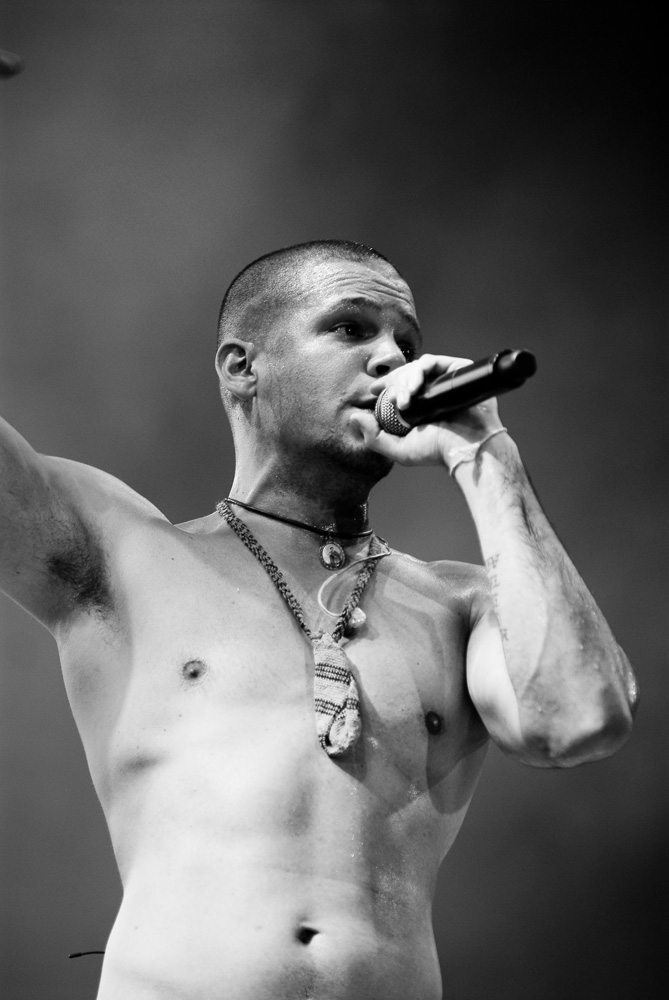
Residente performing in Veracruz, Mexico on August 29, 2009.

Residente's lyrical style is inspired partly by the lyrical approach used by artists such as Vico C and Tego Calderón, trying to minimize what they refer to as "clichés" of the genre -such as open confrontations with other rappers, known in Spanish as tiradera (pronounced [tiɾaˈeɾa] in Puerto Rican dialect). He attempts to stray away from the "wannabe gangster aesthetic" typical of reggaeton music. Residente's trademark is a lyrical style full of sarcasm, satire, parody and shock value, which some critics and fans have likened to Eminem's. Jason Birchmeier of AllMusic writes that Residente's lyrical style and delivery "eschews reggaeton's clichés, showcasing a healthy sense of humor and an almost clownish approach to sarcasm ... A world apart from the kingly bravado of most reggaeton vocalists, not to mention the obligatory glimmers of misogyny and violence that accompany such streetwise swaggering." Residente also utilizes Puerto Rican slang considerably (which in turn incorporates a sizeable dose of Spanglish), as well as allegory. Early in his career, Residente expressed a desire to write lyrics only in Spanish, however he has recently stated that he will begin to write more lyrics in English in order to help communicate with English-speaking listeners.

Residente's lyrics treat a wide and eclectic variety of subjects. He mentions (and sometimes derides) celebrities and icons such as Mickey Mouse, Redman, and 2Pac, in "Tengo Hambre" (I'm Hungry); 50 Cent in "La Crema" (The Cream); Madonna ("I mean, Maradona", Residente says) in "Sin Exagerar" (Without Exaggeration); Puerto Rican singer Nydia Caro (rather affectionately) in "La Era de la Copiaera", wrestler Abdullah the Butcher in "Tributo a la Policía" (A Tribute to Police), golfer Tiger Woods in "Baile de los Pobres" ("Dance of the Poor") he also made a diss track to Diddy in the song "Pi-Di-Di-Di (La Especialidad de la Casa)" (House Specialty) and a diss track aimed at the Federal Bureau of Investigation in "Querido FBI" (Dear FBI).

Visitante, on the other hand, is strongly influenced by electronica, world music, and particularly Latin American folk and popular music. He has also said that he is influenced by music from Central Europe such as Fanfare Ciocarlia (particularly its collaboration with Romani band Kaloome, also known as The Gypsy Kings and Queens) and Emir Kusturica's group, The No Smoking Orchestra. He also stated that his musician father introduced the Beatles and Jimi Hendrix to him at a young age, which has greatly influenced his music. In live presentations, Visitante can be seen playing a variety of instruments: an electric guitar, synthesizers, an accordion, a melodica, a Puerto Rican cuatro and a theremin.

== Members ==
- Residente (René Pérez Joglar) – lead vocals
- Visitante (Eduardo Cabra Martínez) – production, instrumentation, backing vocals
- iLe (PG-13) – backing vocals

Touring musicians

- Andrés Cruz – drums
- Héctor Barez – congas
- Arturo Verges – trombone
- Víctor Vázquez – saxophone
- Ismael Cancel – drums
- Jonathan González – bass guitar
- Jerry D Medina – trumpet
- Michael Santana – clarinet

== Discography ==
- Calle 13 (2005)
- Residente o Visitante (2007)
- Los de Atrás Vienen Conmigo (2008)
- Entren Los Que Quieran (2010)
- Multi Viral (2014)

== Awards and nominations ==
Grammy Awards

Year	Nominee / work	Award	Result
2008	Residente o Visitante	Best Latin Urban Album	Won
2010	Los de Atras Vienen Conmigo	Best Latin Rock, Alternative or Urban Album	Won
2012	Entren Los Que Quieran	Best Latin Pop, Rock or Urban Album	Nominated
2015	Multi Viral	Best Latin Rock, Urban or Alternative Album	Won

Latin Grammy Awards

Year	Nominee / work	Award	Result
2006	Calle 13	Best New Artist	Won
2006	Calle 13	Best Urban Music Album	Won
2006	"Atrévete-te-te"	Best Short Form Music Video	Won
2007	Residente o Visitante	Album of the Year	Nominated
2007	Residiente o Visitante	Best Urban Music Album	Won
2007	"Pa'l Norte" (feat Orishas)	Best Urban Song	Won
2007	"Tango del Pecado"	Best Short Form Music Video	Nominated
2009	Los de Atrás Vienen Conmigo	Album of the Year	Won
2009	Los de Atrás Vienen Conmigo	Best Urban Music Album	Won
2009	"No Hay Nadie Como Tu" (featuring Café Tacuba)	Record of the Year	Won
2009	"No Hay Nadie Como Tu" (featuring Café Tacuba)	Best Alternative Song	Won
2009	"La Perla" (featuring Rubén Blades)	Best Short Form Music Video	Won
2011	Entren Los Que Quieran	Album of the Year	Won
2011	Entren Los Que Quieran	Best Urban Music Album	Won
2011	"Latinoamérica" (featuring Totó la Momposina, Susana Baca and Maria Rita)	Record of the Year	Won
2011	"Latinoamérica"	Song of the Year	Won
2011	"Calma Pueblo"	Best Alternative Song	Won
2011	"Baile de los Pobres" (featuring Rafa Arcaute)	Best Urban Song	Won
2011	"Vamo' a Portarnos Mal"	Best Tropical Song	Won
2011	Rafael Arcaute and Calle 13	Producer of the Year	Won
2011	"Calma Pueblo"	Best Short Form Music Video	Won
2014	Multi Viral	Album of the Year	Nominated
2014	Multi Viral	Best Urban Music Album	Won
2014	"Respira el Momento"	Record of the Year	Nominated
2014	"Ojos Color Sol" (feat Silvio Rodríguez)	Song of the Year	Nominated
2014	"El Aguante"	Best Alternative Song	Won
2014	"Adentro"	Best Urban Song	Nominated
2014	"Cuando los Pies Besan el Piso"	Best Urban Song	Nominated
2014	"Adentro"	Best Urban Performance	Nominated
2014	"Adentro"	Best Short Form Music Video	Nominated
2015	"Ojos Color Sol" (feat Silvio Rodríguez)	Best Short Form Music Video	Won
2015	"Así de Grandes Son las Ideas"	Best Short Form Music Video	Nominated

Billboard Latin Music Awards

Year	Nominee / work	Award	Result
2007	Calle 13	Best Reggaeton Album	Nominated
2009	"No Hay Nadie Como Tu"	Hot Latin Song of the Year Vocal Duet or Collaboration	Nominated

Lo Nuestro Awards

Year	Nominee / work	Award	Result
2008	"Pa'l Norte"	Video of the Year	Nominated
2009	"Un Beso de Desayuno"	Video of the Year	Nominated
2010	"No Hay Nadie Como Tu"	Collaboration of the Year	Nominated

Los Premios MTV Latinoamérica

Year	Nominee / work	Award	Result
2006	Calle 13	Promising Artist	Won
2007	Calle 13	Best Urban Artist	Won
2009	Calle 13	Best Urban Artist	Won

Instituto Cubano de la Música

Year	Nominee / work	Award	Result
2010	Calle 13	Premio Internacional Cubadiscom	Won

Ateneo Puertorriqueño

Year	Nominee / work	Award	Result
2011	Calle 13	Medalla Ramón Emeterio Betances	Won

== See also ==
- Music of Puerto Rico
- Alternative-reggaeton
