= Vico C discography =

- Studio albums: 11
- Live albums: 2
- Compilation albums: 10
- Singles: 14
- Music videos: 10
- Featured singles: 1

Vico C (born Luis Armando Lozada Cruz on September 8, 1971) is a Puerto Rican rapper and reggaeton songwriter. He is one of the founding fathers of reggaeton and the real father of rap music in Puerto Rico. Vico C has played an influential role in the development of Latin American hip-hop.

== Albums ==
Studio albums

Year	Title	Album details	Peak chart positions				Certifications (sales thresholds)
Year	Title	Album details	US LATIN	US LATIN POP	US TROP.	US HEAT.	Certifications (sales thresholds)
1989	La Recta Final	Released: August 19, 1989; Format: Compact Cassette, digital download	—	—	—	—	
1990	Misión: La Cima	Released: January 18, 1990; Label: RCA Records; Format: CD, digital download	—	—	—	—	
1991	Hispanic Soul	Released: August 13, 1991; Label: RCA Records; Format: CD, digital download	—	—	10	—	
1993	Xplosión	Released: September 14, 1993; Label: RCA Records; Format: CD, digital download	—	—	—	—	
1996	Con poder	Released: June 18, 1996; Label: Sony BMG, RCA Records; Format: CD, digital download	—	—	—	—	
1998	Aquel Que Había Muerto	Released: December 1, 1998; Label: EMI Music Distribution; Format: CD	10	6	—	—	
2002	Emboscada	Released: July 2, 2002; Label: EMI Music Distribution; Format: CD, digital download	36	16	—	—	
2003	En Honor a la Verdad	Released: November 18, 2003; Label: EMI Music Distribution; Format: CD, digital download	5	4	—	6	RIAA: Platinum (Latin)
2005	Desahogo	Released: March 1, 2005; Label: EMI Music Distribution; Format: CD, digital download	8	—	3	21	RIAA: Platinum (Latin)
2009	Babilla	Released: October 6, 2009; Label: EMI Music Distribution; Format: CD, digital download	13	—	—	—	
2023	Pánico	Released: June 15, 2023; Label: Nain Music; Format: digital download, streaming	—	—	—	—	

Live albums

Year	Title	Album details	Peak chart positions
Year	Title	Album details	US LATIN
2001	Vivo	Released: June 5, 2001; Label: EMI Music Distribution; Format: CD	43
2006	El Encuentro	Released: February 21, 2006; Label: EMI Music Distribution; Format: DVD, digital download	—

Compilation albums

Year	Title	Album details	Peak chart positions		
Year	Title	Album details	US LATIN	US LATIN POP	US TROP.
1995	Dos Tiempos Bajo Un Mismo Tono	Released: January 18, 1995; Label: RCA Records; Format: CD, digital download	—	—	15
1995	Greatest Hits	Released: November 22, 1994; Label: Prime Sound, RCA Records; Format: CD	—	—	—
1998	Historia	Released: January 12, 1999; Label: Ariola International, RCA Records; Format: CD, digital download	18	9	—
1998	Historia 2	Released: March 23, 1999; Label: Sony BMG, RCA Records; Format: CD, digital download	40	—	—
2000	Serie Platino	Released: January 11, 2000; Label: Ariola International, RCA Records; Format: CD, digital download	—	—	—
2000	Serie 2000	Released: August 8, 2000; Label: Sony BMG, RCA Records; Format: CD, digital download	—	—	—
2004	The Files: The Greatest Hits	Released: March 23, 2004; Label: EMI Music Distribution; Format: CD	—	—	—
2007	Vico C Digital Collection 1987-2007	Released: October 9, 2007; Label: Prime Records; Format: Digital download	—	—	—
2008	El Filósofo: Platinum Edition	Released: May 27, 2008; Label: EMI Music Distribution; Format: CD	—	—	—
2011	Colaboraciones De Ayer Y Hoy	Released: October 28, 2011; Label: Capitol Records, EMI Music Distribution; Format: CD, digital download	—	—	—
2013	Frente A Frente with Julio Voltio	Released: July 30, 2013; Label: Sony Music Latin; Format: CD	—	—	—

== Singles ==
=== As lead artist ===
Year	Title	Peak chart positions			Album
Year	Title	US LATIN	US LATIN POP	US TROP.	Album
1990	«She Likes My Reggae»	—	—	—	Misión: La Cima
1991	«Te Voy A Tomar»	—	—	—	Hispanic Soul
1992	«Saboréalo»	—	—	—	Xplosión
1992	«María»	—	—	—	Xplosión
1993	«Xplosión»	—	—	—	Xplosión
1998	«Aquel Que Había Muerto» Featuring Funky	—	17	20	Aquel Que Había Muerto
1998	«Quieren»	40	19	16	Aquel Que Había Muerto
2002	«Emboscada»	40	33	—	Emboscada
2003	«Para Mi Barrio» Featuring D'Mingo and Tony Touch	—	—	18	En Honor a la Verdad
2003	«5 De Septiembre»	—	—	—	En Honor a la Verdad
2004	«Desahogo»	—	—	30	Desahogo
2004	«Se Escaman» Featuring Eddie Dee	—	—	26	Desahogo
2009	«Babilla»	—	—	—	Babilla
2009	«Sentimiento» Featuring Arcángel	34	—	11	Babilla
2015	«Lloran Los Nenes» Featuring El Bima	—	—	—	
2017	«Y Boquete Pa' Tu Techo»	—	—	—	

=== As guest artist ===
Year	Title	Peak chart positions	Album
Year	Title	US TROP.	Album
2004	«Los 12 Discípulos» Eddie Dee featuring Gallego, Vico C, Tego Calderón, Julio Voltio, Zion & Lennox, Daddy Yankee, Ivy Queen, Johnny Prez, Nicky Jam and Wiso G	8	12 Discípulos

== Music videos ==
=== As lead artist ===
Year	Title	Album
1990	«Me Acuerdo»	Misión: La Cima
1998	«Aquel Que Había Muerto»	Aquel Que Había Muerto
1998	«Quieren»	Aquel Que Había Muerto
2002	«Yerba Mala»	Emboscada
2002	«Los Perros»	Emboscada
2003	«5 De Septiembre»	En Honor a la Verdad
2004	«Desahogo»	Desahogo
2009	«Babilla»	Babilla
2009	«Sentimiento» Featuring Arcángel	Babilla
2011	«Oye» Featuring Funky	Colaboraciones De Ayer Y Hoy
2017	«Y Boquete Pa' Tu Techo»	
2023	«Pregúntale A Tu Papá Por Mí»	Pánico
2023	«Ella Va»	Pánico

=== As guest artist ===
Year	Title	Album
2004	«Los 12 Discípulos» Eddie Dee featuring Gallego, Vico C, Tego Calderón, Julio Voltio, Zion & Lennox, Daddy Yankee, Ivy Queen, Johnny Prez, Nicky Jam and Wiso G	12 Discípulos
2007	«Raperito» Gerardo Mejía featuring Vico C	La Iglesia De La Calle
2010	«Soy José» Rescate featuring Vico C	Arriba!
2011	«Pao Pao Pao» Redimi2 featuring Vico C	Exterminador Operación P.R.
2013	«Ya No Más» Los Apóstoles Del Rap featuring Noel Schajris and Vico C	—N/a
2019	«Te Irás Con el Año Viejo» Lunay & Vico C	

== Collaborations ==
=== As lead artist ===
Year	Title	Featured artist(s)	Album
1996	«Un Beso Y Una Flor»	Seguridad Social	Con Poder
1998	«Calla»	Funky	Aquel Que Había Muerto
1998	«Careta»	Funky	Aquel Que Había Muerto
2002	«Para Mi Barrio»	D'Mingo and Tony Touch	En Honor a la Verdad
2002	«El Bueno, El Malo Y El Feo»	Tego Calderón and Eddie Dee	En Honor a la Verdad
2004	«Se Escaman»	Eddie Dee	Desahogo
2004	«Lo Grande Que Es Perdonar»	Gilberto Santa Rosa	Desahogo
2004	«Te Me Puedo Escapar»	Cultura Profética	Desahogo
2004	«Vámonos Po' Encima»	D'Mingo and Mala Rodríguez	Desahogo
2004	«Échale»	Ivy Queen	Desahogo
2008	«Mendigo»	Héctor El Father	—N/a
2009	«Sentimiento»	Arcángel	Babilla
2009	«Se Escapa»	Yaga & Mackie	Babilla
2009	«Payasito»	Wiso G	Babilla
2009	«Prueba De Farmacia»	Gustavo Laureano	Babilla
2009	«Angelina»	Ángel Lopez	Babilla
2009	«Aquí La Que Falló Fue Usted»	Andy Montañéz	Babilla
2011	«Oye»	Funky	Colaboraciones De Ayer Y Hoy
2011	«Espérame»	Divino	Colaboraciones De Ayer Y Hoy
2015	«Lloran Los Nenes»	El Bima	—N/a

=== As guest artist ===
Year	Title	Artists	Album
1999	«La Leyenda»	DJ Playero featuring Vico C and Mexicano	Playero 41: Past Present & Future
2001	«Tiempo»	Jarabe De Palo featuring Vico C and Jovanotti	De Vuelta y Vuelta
2001	«Después De La Caída»	Funky featuring René González and Vico C	Funkytown
2004	«Los 12 Discípulos»	Eddie Dee featuring Gallego, Vico C, Tego Calderón, Julio Voltio, Zion & Lennox, Daddy Yankee, Ivy Queen, Johnny Prez, Nicky Jam and Wiso G	12 Discípulos
2006	«Follow my lead»	Massari featuring Vico C	Massari
2007	«Raperito»	Gerardo Mejía featuring Vico C	La Iglesia De La Calle
2010	«Soy José»	Rescate featuring Vico C	Arriba!
2011	«Pao Pao Pao»	Redimi2 featuring Vico C	Exterminador Operación P.R.
2011	«Mala Hierba» (Live)	Alejandra Guzmán featuring Vico C	20 Años de Éxitos En Vivo con Moderatto
2011	«Pao Pao Pao» (Remix)	Redimi2 featuring Funky and Vico C	—N/a
2013	«Ya No Más»	Los Apóstoles Del Rap featuring Noel Schajris and Vico C	—N/a
2014	«¿Qué Les Pasó?»	Tito El Bambino featuring Vico C	Alta Jerarquía
2015	«Me Acuerdo»	Ivy Queen featuring Vico C	Vendetta: The Project
2015	«Canoita»	Paulina Aguirre featuring Taboo and Vico C	Frágil
2019	«Te Irás Con el Año Viejo»	Lunay & Vico C	
