= Con poder (Vico C album) =

Con Poder

Studio album by Vico C
- Released: June 18, 1996
- Recorded: 1995–96; VC Music
- Genre: Latin hip-hop; conscious hip-hop; alternative reggaeton
- Length: 39:46
- Label: Sony BMG
- Producer: Vico C

Vico C chronology
Xplosión (1993)	Con Poder (1996)	Aquel Que Había Muerto (1998)

Con Poder is the third studio album (fifth overall) by the Puerto Rican rap and hip-hop singer Vico C, released on January 31, 1996 by Sony BMG. Encompassing Latin hip-hop, conscious hip-hop and alternative reggaeton. It is his first album with Christian content. It contains social conscious lyrics and confessions of his personal life; drug addiction and his health following motor vehicle collision. The album was supported by the release of two official singles: "Humolandia" and "Necesitamos de Él" ("We Need Him" in English) both released in 1995. Also, it contains the theme "Plomo", based on the soundtrack of The Good, the Bad and the Ugly and the song "Un beso y una flor" by Nino Bravo, played by the band Seguridad Social and Vico C.

Con Poder did not sell well and was the artist only album on the release on Sony BMG label. Following the commercial disappointment of the record, both sides decided to parted waves. In retrospective, the artist expressed on his autobiographical film Vico C: La Vida del Filósofo, that the album did not have the necessary distribution, because his record label did not agree with the lyrics that the singer performed on the album. For this reason, on his album Emboscada, he re-released the song "La Movida", with a new version and where he hints at what happened in greater detail.

== Track listing ==
No.	Title	Writer(s)	Length
1.	"La movida"	Luis Lozada	3:32
2.	"La roca"	L. Lozada	3:21
3.	"Danza"	L. Lozada	4:43
4.	"Se Escapa"	L. Lozada	4:28
5.	"Con poder"	L. Lozada	4:28
6.	"Fuego"	L. Lozada	4:32
7.	"Sin semilla"	L. Lozada	3:48
8.	"Libro controversial"	L. Lozada	3:10
9.	"Plomo"	L. Lozada	3:59
10.	"Un beso y una flor (featuring Seguridad Social)"	L. Lozada	3:47
