= Babilla (album) =

Studio album by Vico C
- Released: October 6, 2009
- Recorded: 2009
- Studio: Más Flow Studios; (Carolina, Puerto Rico); Pichaera Studios; (San Juan, Puerto Rico); Golden Boy Studios; (San Juan, Puerto Rico); Rotary Music Studios; (Bayamón, Puerto Rico)
- Genre: Latin hip-hop; conscious hip-hop; alternative reggaeton
- Length: 54:52
- Label: Caribbean Records (Note: Under exclusive license to EMI Televisa.)
- Producer: Vico C (also exec.); Diesel

Vico C chronology
Desahogo (2005)	Babilla (2009)	Colaboraciones de Ayer y Hoy (2011)

Singles from Babilla
- 1. "Sentimiento" Released: August 28, 2009; 2. "Babilla" Released: October 10, 2009

Babilla is the eight studio album by Puerto Rican rapper Vico C, released on October 6, 2009, through Caribbean Records under exclusive license to EMI Televisa. The 69% of the album was recorded at Luny Tunes' Más Flow Studios in Carolina, Puerto Rico, while the remaining 31% was recorded at Pichaera Studios, Golden Boy Studios (both in San Juan, Puerto Rico) and Rotary Music Studios (Bayamón, Puerto Rico). Vico C produced almost the entire album, while Hyde, Luis Almonte and Joel Morales worked as recording engineers. Half the album was mixed at KDS Studios, while American producer Mike Fuller mastered it at Fullersound Inc., both studios located in Florida. All tracks feature session musicians for guitars, drums, trumpet, trombone, saxophone and choirs, while Vico C played the electronic keyboard on eight of the thirteen songs that includes the album.

It features urban artists including Arcángel, Yaga & Mackie and Wiso G, and also other artists from other genres like Gustavo Laureano, Ángel López and Andy Montañez. The album was nominated for a Latin Grammy Award for Best Urban Music Album on 2010, losing to Chino & Nacho's Mi Niña Bonita. Its lead single, "Sentimiento", was also nominated for a Latin Grammy Award for Best Urban Song, but lost to La Mala Rodríguez' "No Pidas Perdón".

This production was followed by a compilation release made by Sony Music Latin titled Frente a Frente with former reggaeton artist Julio Voltio, released in 2013. Commercially, Babilla is the less successful studio album by Vico C since 1998 and also the first one since that year that appeared in only one category on Billboard charts, debuting 13th on Top Latin Albums and charting just two weeks.

== Background ==
Babilla was released four years after his last studio album, Desahogo, and three years after his last production (excluding greatest hits compilations), which was a live album titled El Encuentro. During the 2000s, Vico C was certificated twice by the Recording Industry Association of America (RIAA) for his albums En Honor A La Verdad and Desahogo, (Note: Both albums received a latin platinum certification for over 100,000 copies sold in the United States (prior to November 2013).) and won two Latin Grammy Awards for Best Urban Music Album for Vivo and also for En Honor A La Verdad. According to EMI Latin, Vico C sold 750,000 copies worldwide as of May 2004. As of his personal life, he adopted a 7-year-old girl named Joselyn in September 2006, being his fourth child with his wife Sonia Torres and fifth in total. In 2008, Vico C collaborated for the first time with Héctor el Father, who was recently converted into christianity and also wrote the song "Y Llora" for his last album: Juicio Final.

== Lyrics ==
Vico C was always been characterized for his social, political and religious themes on his lyrics, which became more common after his full conversion into christianity in the mid-90s. The themes on Babilla are centered in Vico's personal experiences, society, morality, low class life, human self reflection and romance, with conscious hip hop and alternative reggaeton as its main genres.

The cover's dark atmosphere and Vico C holding up an anti-pollution mask might represent the society's contamination with crime (blood on the street, the police car behind Vico and a barricade tape), poverty (the homeless man and the buildings deterioration) and prostitution (the strip club at the background).

The first track, «Babilla» (Puerto Rican jargon for Courage), serves as the album's intro, and its concept is similar to the one in his previous studio album, Desahogo, being a relief to all that annoys him, mentioning Donald Trump's xenophobia, sexual video games, religion and people who want to take advantage with his music. «Sentimiento» (Spanish for Feeling) talks about a beautiful and attractive woman who wants a sincere romantic relationship and getting married instead of money and luxury. «Se Escapa» (Spanish for She Escapes) is about respecting and taking care of one's girlfriend in order to not lose her. «Moriré» (Spanish for I Will Die) is a romantic ballad about dying for a woman if she is no longer interested in one's feelings after a long relationship, using a lot of analogies centered in animals and nature. «El Silencio Mata» (Spanish for Silence Kills) talks about a woman who suffers of domestic violence but needs to talk to someone about that, although she's too scared to denounce his own spouse. «El Corazón Se Pone Bruto» (Spanish for The Heart Gets Stupid) is a moralizing reggaeton about thinking before acting and encouraging the use of preservative, telling two stories about girls that are attracted to men they recently know, both with terrible endings (one girl ends pregnant and the other contracting AIDS). «La Prueba de Farmacia» (Spanish for Pharmacy Test) tells the story about a pregnant teenager who tries to convince her mother that her boyfriend will take care of her whatever happens. «Angelina» tells the story about a low class single mother who have to work as a stripper in order to earn enough money to feed her baby after being abandoned by her boyfriend. «Agua» is about Vico's detention in late 2002 because of porting heroin in his car, complaining about the police and Puerto Rican justice. The term agua (literally water in Spanish) is used in the song as a Puerto Rican jargon referring to the police.

== Track listing ==
All tracks produced by Vico C (except track 6, produced by Diesel).

No.	Title	Writer(s)	Length
1.	"Babilla"	Luis Lozada	4:28
2.	"Pólvora"	L. Lozada	4:03
3.	"Sentimiento" (featuring Arcángel)	L. Lozada	3:41
4.	"Se Escapa" (featuring Yaga & Mackie)	L. Lozada; Javier Martínez; Luis Pizarro	5:25
5.	"Moriré"	L. Lozada	4:21
6.	"Payasito" (featuring Wiso G)	L. Lozada; Ángel Ortiz; Armando Rosario	3:22
7.	"El Silencio Mata"	L. Lozada	4:16
8.	"El Corazón Se Pone Bruto"	L. Lozada	3:22
9.	"La Prueba de Farmacia" (featuring Gustavo Laureano)	L. Lozada	3:59
10.	"Por Eso Lloro"	L. Lozada	3:47
11.	"Angelina" (featuring Ángel López)	L. Lozada	4:32
12.	"Aquí La Que Falló Fue Usted" (featuring Andy Montañez)	L. Lozada	3:57
13.	"Agua"	L. Lozada	3:56

== Credits and personnel ==
Credits adapted from the CD information.

Musicians

- Luis Lozada: Vocals (all), lyrics (all), electronic keyboard (tracks 2–5, 7, 10, 11, 13), producer (all but 6), background vocals on "Aquí La Que Falló Fue Usted" and executive producer.
- Aaron Peña: Drums (tracks 4, 7 and 8).
- Anthony Calo: Drums (tracks 4, 7 and 8).
- Nak Casiano: Vocals (tracks 4 and 8).
- Charlie de Jesús: Guitars (tracks 4, 7 and 10).
- Harold Hopkins: Bass (tracks 4 and 5).
- Luis Díaz: Trumpet (tracks 4, 9 and 13).
- Nelson Colón: Trombone (tracks 4 and 13).
- Jovanni Santos: Percussion on "Se Escapa".
- Armando Rosario: Lyrics on "Payasito".
- Jackie Escandarani: Choir on "El Silencio Mata".
- Francisco Ortíz: Choir on "El Silencio Mata".
- Celenia Sanchez: Choir on "El Silencio Mata" and background vocals on "Aquí La Que Falló Fue Usted".
- Francisco Rosado: Percussion (tracks 7 and 10).
- Juan Cobarubia: Guitars on "La Prueba de Farmacia".
- Nabeel Abdulrahman: Guitars on "La Prueba de Farmacia".
- Alex Iglesias: Trombone on "La Prueba de Farmacia".
- Natanael Afanadon: Saxophone on "La Prueba de Farmacia".
- Gilberto Mena: Piano on "Aquí La Que Falló Fue Usted"
- Etienne Rivera: Percussion on "Aquí La Que Falló Fue Usted"
- Joel Marrero: Bass on "Aquí La Que Falló Fue Usted".

Guest artists

- Austin Santos: Vocals on "Sentimiento".
- Javier Martinez: Vocals and lyrics on "Se Escapa".
- Luis Pizarro: Vocals and lyrics on "Se Escapa".
- Ángel Ortíz: Vocals and lyrics on "Payasito".
- Gustavo Laureano: Vocals on "La Prueba de Farmacia".
- Ángel López: Vocals on "Angelina".
- Andrés Montañéz: Vocals on "Aquí La Que Falló Fue Usted".

Production

- José Cotto: Recording engineer (tracks 1–10) and mixing (all but 12).
- Armando Rosario: Producer on "Payasito".
- Luis Almonte: Recording engineer (tracks 6, 11–13) and mixing and electronic keyboard on "Aquí La Que Falló Fue Usted".
- Joel Morales: Recording engineer (tracks 7, 11, 13).
- Mike Fuller: Mastering.

Studios

- Más Flow Studios (Carolina, P.R.): Recording (tracks 1–6 and 8–10) and mixing (5).
- Pichaera Studios (San Juan, P.R.): Recording (tracks 6 and 11–13) and mixing (12).
- Rotary Music Studios (Bayamón, P.R.): Recording (track 7) and mixing (1–6 and 9).
- Golden Boy Studios (San Juan, P.R.): Recording (track 13).
- KDS Studios (Florida, U.S.): Mixing (tracks 3, 7, 8, 10, 11 and 13).
- Fullersound, Inc. (Florida, U.S.): Mastering.

Other

- Carlos Martin: Photographer.
- Milton Cruz: Stylist.
- Luis Marquez: CD artwork design.
- Omar Hernandez: CD artwork design.
- Edwin Prado: Executive producer and management.

== Charts performance ==
Chart (2009)	Position
Argentine Album (CAPIF)	16
U.S. Top Latin Albums	13

== Nominations ==
Year	Nominee / work	Award	Result
2010	Babilla	Latin Grammy Award – Best Urban Music Album	Nominated
2010	"Sentimiento" (featuring Arcángel)	Latin Grammy Award – Best Urban Song	Nominated
