= Eddie Dee discography =

- Studio albums: 2
- Compilation albums: 2
- Singles: 5
- Music videos: 14
- Recompilation albums: 2
- Mixtapes: 1

The discography of Eddie Dee, a Puerto Rican singer-songwriter, rapper and lyricist, consists of two studio albums, two compilation albums, a mixtape, and two recompilation albums as of December 2015.

Eddie Dee began his career in 1990 and launched his debut studio album three years later. His second album became popular in Puerto Rico and was titled Tagwut in 1997. It featured the hit single "Señor Official". His following releases El Terrorista de la Lírica (2000) and Biografía (2001), too enjoyed underground success. The 2004 album 12 Discípulos is regarded as "the greatest reggaetón various artist album of all time". The album features songs by some of the most successful reggaetón artist, including the intro of the album, where they all come together as one to show that "unity is needed for the genre reggaetón to survive and evolve". It was a collaboration between eleven other artist including Daddy Yankee, Tego Calderon, Ivy Queen, and Vico C among others, who were among the most requested at the time. The track, known as "Los 12 Discípulos" or "Quítate Tu Pa' Ponerme Yo" reached number eight on the Billboard Tropical Songs chart, and was nominated for a 2005 Billboard Latin Music Award for "Tropical Airplay Track of the Year, New Artist". The album itself reached number one on the Billboard Tropical Albums chart for three nonconsecutive weeks.

== Albums ==
Studio albums

Year	Title	Album details
1993	Eddie Dee & The Ghetto Crew	Released: August 24, 1993; Label: Prime Records; Formats: CD, Digital download
2000	El Terrorista De La Lírica	Released: October 17, 2000; Label: Fresh Productions; Formats: CD, Digital download

Compilation albums

Year	Title	Album details	Notes
1997	Tagwut	Released: August 12, 1997; Label: Prime Records; Formats: CD, Digital download	
2004	12 Discípulos	Released: January 29, 2004; Label: Diamond Music; Formats: CD, Digital download	Sold over 70,000 copies in Puerto Rico after three weeks of its release and reached the top position in Billboard's US Tropical Albums charts.

Mixtapes

Year	Title	Album details	Notes
2007	The Final Countdown	Released: June 5, 2007; Label: Diamond Music; Formats: Digital download	The mixtape was released to promote his third studio album, El Diario, which was scheduled to be released in November 2007. Although, it was postponed and was never released.

Recompilation albums

Year	Title	Album details	Notes
2001	Biografía	Released: May 29, 2001; Label: Diamond Music; Formats: CD, Digital download	
2009	Oro Reggaetonero: 20 Éxitos; Eddie Dee Edition	Released: February 3, 2009; Label: Black Lion Music; Formats: Digital download	The album was released as part of Black Lion Music's Oro Reggaetonero series, which compiles the most successful songs of a certain artist. The other editions of this series involves Falo, Don Chezina, Alberto Stylee, Frankie Boy, Rey Pirín, and Daddy Yankee & Nicky Jam.

== Singles ==
Year	Title	Album	Notes
1997	«Señor Oficial»	Tagwut	Won two Puerto Rican Rap and Reggae Awards for Best Lyrics and Best Song in 1997.
1998	«Amor Mío»	Biografía	Won a Puerto Rican Rap and Reggae Award for Best Song in 1998.
2004	«Los 12 Discípulos» Featuring Gallego, Vico C, Tego Calderón, Julio Voltio, Zion & Lennox, Daddy Yankee, Ivy Queen, Johnny Prez, Nicky Jam and Wiso G	12 Discípulos	Nominated for a Billboard Latin Music Award for Tropical Airplay Track of the Year, New Artist in 2005. #8 in US Latin Tropical Airplay (Billboard) charts.
2005	«Taladro» Featuring Daddy Yankee	12 Discípulos (Special Edition)	#22 in US Latin Tropical Airplay (Billboard) charts.
2010	«Carolina»		

== Music videos ==
=== As lead artist ===
Year	Title	Album
1997	«Señor Oficial»	Tagwut
1997	«Directamente Del Ghetto»	Biografía
1998	«Amor Mío» (Remix); Featuring Cultura Profética	Biografía
2000	«En Peligro De Extinción» / «Reggaeton, Reggaeton» Featuring Tego Calderón (Note: This was Calderón's debut on a music video. He is still very grateful and loyal to Eddie Dee because he was the only person who supported him at his early career.)	El Terrorista De La Lírica
2001	«Toma, Coge, Traga, Come» (Note: The chorus was taken from Vico C's 1993 funk single «Saboreálo».)	Biografía
2002	«Soltero Y Sin Compromiso»	The Majestic
2002	«Más Bellaqueo»	La Misión Vol. 3
2004	«Los 12 Discípulos» Featuring Gallego, Vico C, Tego Calderón, Julio Voltio, Zion & Lennox, Daddy Yankee, Ivy Queen, Johnny Prez, Nicky Jam and Wiso G	12 Discípulos
2004	«Si Tú No Cuidas Tu Mujer»	12 Discípulos
2004	«Sácame El Guante»	12 Discípulos
2004	«Censurarme»	12 Discípulos
2005	«Taladro» Featuring Daddy Yankee	12 Discípulos (Special Edition)
2009	«Eso No Va Conmigo»	(Note: Both songs were released as part of Eddie Dee's mixtape 180 Grados, scheduled to be released in March 2009, but it was postponed to an indefinite date.)
2010	«Carolina»	(Note: Both songs were released as part of Eddie Dee's mixtape 180 Grados, scheduled to be released in March 2009, but it was postponed to an indefinite date.)

=== As guest artist ===
Year	Title	Album
1994	«Straight From The Ghetto» DJ Guichy featuring Eddie Dee, Mr. Biggie and Horny Man & Panty Man	Straight From The Ghetto
1996	«Back To Business» Frankie Boy, Eddie Dee, Horny Man & Panty Man, OGM & Oakley, Camaleón, Bobby Jacko & Chinito and Q Mack Daddy	U Records Vol. 4: Back To Business
1997	«Sin Clemencia» DJ Chiclin featuring Camaleón, Panny, Buru Fat-Z, Eddie Dee, Original Q, Frankie Boy and Sisco	DJ Chiclin Vol. 5: Sin Clemencia
1997	«The Melody» DJ Goldy featuring Original Q, Eddie Dee, Nico Canadá, Notty Boy and Daddy Yankee	DJ Goldy Vol. 3: The Melody
1998	«Mataron A Un Inocente / ¿Por Qué? / ¿Qué Será Nuestro Destino?» Héctor & Tito, Eddie Dee and Mr. Cavalucci	El Cartel
2007	«Amor De Pobre» Zion featuring Eddie Dee	The Perfect Melody

== Collaborations ==
=== As lead artist ===
Year	Title	Album
1996	«Rastaricans» Featuring Horny Man & Panty Man	U Records Vol. 4: Back To Business
1997	«Amor Mío» (Remix); Featuring Cultura Profética	Biografía
2000	«No Amarres Fuego» Featuring Maicol & Manuel	El Terrorista De La Lírica
2000	«Quiero» Featuring Frankie Ruiz	El Terrorista De La Lírica
2000	«En Peligro De Extinción» Featuring Tego Calderón	El Terrorista De La Lírica
2000	«El Reencuentro» Featuring Horny Man & Panty Man and OGM & Oakley	El Terrorista De La Lírica
2004	«Los 12 Discípulos» Featuring Gallego, Vico C, Tego Calderón, Julio Voltio, Zion & Lennox, Daddy Yankee, Ivy Queen, Johnny Prez, Nicky Jam and Wiso G	12 Discípulos
2005	«Taladro» Featuring Daddy Yankee	12 Discípulos (Special Edition)
2010	«Carolina» (Remix); Featuring Julio Voltio, Falo, Tito El Bambino and Zion & Lennox	

=== As guest artist ===
Year	Title	Album
1994	«Straight From The Ghetto» DJ Guichy featuring Eddie Dee, Mr. Biggie and Horny Man & Panty Man	Straight From The Ghetto
1997	«Sin Clemencia» DJ Chiclin featuring Camaleón, Panny, Buru Fat-Z, Eddie Dee, Original Q, Frankie Boy and Sisco	DJ Chiclin Vol. 5: Sin Clemencia
2002	«No Me La Explota» Tego Calderón featuring Eddie Dee	El Abayarde
2003	«El Bueno, El Malo Y El Feo» Vico C featuring Tego Calderón and Eddie Dee	En Honor a la Verdad
2003	«Sé Que Tú Quieres» Johnny Prez featuring Eddie Dee	El Dragón
2004	«Se Escaman» Vico C featuring Eddie Dee	Desahogo
2005	«La Locura Automática» (Remix); La Secta AllStar featuring Eddie Dee	12 Discípulos (Special Edition)
2005	«Estoy Llegando» Johnny Prez featuring Eddie Dee	The Prezident
2006	«Déjala Volar» (Remix); Tito El Bambino featuring Eddie Dee	
2006	«Falso Llanto» (Remix); Comando Tiburón featuring Eddie Dee	
2006	«Payaso» Tego Calderón featuring Eddie Dee and Julio Voltio	The Underdog
2006	«Quiero Saber» Johnny Prez featuring Eddie Dee	The Knockouts
2007	«Suavecito» Gustavo Laureano featuring Eddie Dee	King Callero Del Amor
2007	«Easy» Julio Voltio, Zion, Tego Calderón, Cosculluela and Eddie Dee	El Pentágono
2007	«Amor De Pobre» Zion featuring Eddie Dee	The Perfect Melody
2008	«Black Or White» Sasha featuring Eddie Dee	Caribbean Connection
2011	«La Trampa» Alexis & Fido featuring Eddie Dee	Perreología
2013	«Sistema» (Remix); Wisin featuring Jory, Tito El Bambino, Cosculluela and Eddie Dee	

== Appearances in compilation albums ==
Year	Title	Album
1994	[Untitled Track]	Straight From The Ghetto
1996	«Rastaricans» Featuring Horny Man & Panty Man	U Records Vol. 4: Back To Business
1997	[Untitled Track]	DJ Chiclin Vol. 5: Sin Clemencia
1997	«¿Por Qué?»	El Cartel
1997	«Sube Y Baja» «Sonido Guerrero»	Boricua Guerrero
1999	«Todo Listo Para La Misión»	La Misión
2002	«Soltero Y Sin Compromiso»	The Majestic
2002	«Más Bellaqueo»	La Misión Vol. 3
2002	«Transformers»	Planet Reggae
2003	«Vivito Y Coleando»	Blin Blin Vol. 1
2004	«Háblame Claro»	Majestic II: Segundo Imperio
2005	«Vámonos Po' Encima»	MVP 2: The Grand Slam
2005	«Esto Es Pa' Picar»	Guatagatos
2006	«Pequeña Dosis»	The Familia: Lealtad
2007	«Easy» Julio Voltio, Zion, Tego Calderón, Cosculluela and Eddie Dee	El Pentágono
2008	«Black Or White» Sasha featuring Eddie Dee	Caribbean Connection

== Credits as lyricist only ==
Year	Title	Album	Co-writer(s)	Peak chart positions							Certifications (sales thresholds)
Year	Title	Album	Co-writer(s)	US	US LATIN	US RAP	US TROPICAL	US RHYTHM	ITA	DEN	Certifications (sales thresholds)
2004	«Donde Hubo Fuego» Daddy Yankee	12 Discípulos	Ramón Ayala; Francisco Saldaña; Victor Cabrera	—	—	—	—	—	—	—	
2004	«Se Te Apagó El Bling Bling» Vico C	12 Discípulos	Luis Lozada	—	—	—	—	—	—	—	
2004	«Tú Y Yo» Nicky Jam	12 Discípulos	Nick Rivera	—	—	—	—	—	—	—	
2004	«Atrevida Bandolera» Julio Voltio	12 Discípulos	Julio Ramos	—	—	—	—	—	—	—	
2004	«Qué Es La Que Hay» Ivy Queen	12 Discípulos	Martha Pesante	—	—	—	—	—	—	—	
2004	«Nebuleando Conmigo» Johnny Prez	12 Discípulos	Jonathan Rodríguez	—	—	—	—	—	—	—	
2004	«Medley 2004» Wiso G	12 Discípulos	Luis Torres	—	—	—	—	—	—	—	
2004	«Gasolina» Daddy Yankee	Barrio Fino	Ramón Ayala	32	17	10	2	1	2	2	
2004	«Like You» Daddy Yankee	Barrio Fino	Ramón Ayala	78	—	22	—	—	—	—	
2005	«Rompe» Daddy Yankee	Barrio Fino En Directo	Ramón Ayala	24	1	—	1	1	—	—	RIAA: Platinum
2005	«Machucando» Daddy Yankee	Barrio Fino En Directo	Ramón Ayala	108	1	—	1	3	—	—	
2006	«Mi Chica Rebelde» Tito El Bambino	Top of the Line		—	—	—	—	—	—	—	
2010	«Un Cambio» Jowell & Randy featuring De La Ghetto, Guelo Star, Syko, Chyno Nyno and Julio Voltio		Joel Muñoz; Randy Ortíz	—	—	—	—	—	—	—	
2012	«Te Dijeron» Plan B	La Fórmula		—	—	—	—	2	—	—	
