= Latin Grammy Award for Best Urban Music Album =

Honor presented annually

- Awarded for: vocal or instrumental urban music albums containing at least 51% playing time of newly recorded material
- Country: United States
- Presented by: The Latin Recording Academy
- First award: July 18, 2001; 25 years ago
- Currently held by: Karol G for Tropicoqueta (2026)
- Website: latingrammy.com

The Latin Grammy Award for Best Urban Music Album is an honor presented annually at the Latin Grammy Awards, a ceremony that recognizes excellence and promotes a wider awareness of cultural diversity and contributions of Latin recording artists in the United States and internationally. According to the category description guide for the 13th Latin Grammy Awards, the award is for vocal or instrumental merengue house, R&B, reggaeton and rap music albums containing at least 51 percent playing time of newly recorded material. The award was first presented as the Best Rap/Hip-Hop Album until it received its current name, Best Urban Music Album, at the 5th Latin Grammy Awards ceremony in 2004.

The accolade for Best Urban Music Album was first presented to the Argentine band Sindicato Argentino del Hip Hop at the second Latin Grammy Awards in 2001 for their album Un Paso a la Eternidad. In 2009, the Puerto Rican duo Calle 13 became the first urban act to be presented with Best Urban Music Album and Album of the Year for their album Los de Atrás Vienen Conmigo (2008). Karol G became the first female artist to win the award twice, her album Manana Sera Bonito became the first album by a female artist to win both Best Urban Music Album and Album of the Year in 2023. Bad Bunny has also won this award and Album of the Year for his album Debi Tirar Mas Fotos in 2025.

Residente is the most awarded artist in this category, with five; one solo and four as part of Calle 13. In 2013, Mala Rodríguez became the first female artist and the first Spanish artist to win the award. Puerto Rican singers Tito "El Bambino" and Ivy Queen are tied with the most nominations without a win, with three each.

== Winners and nominees ==
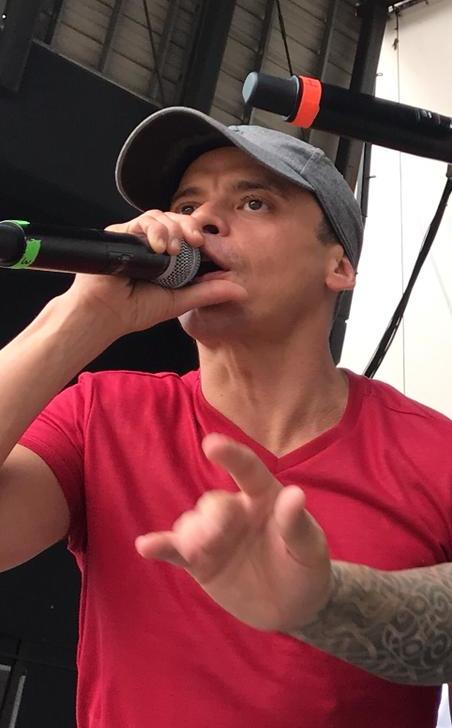
Two-time winner Vico C.

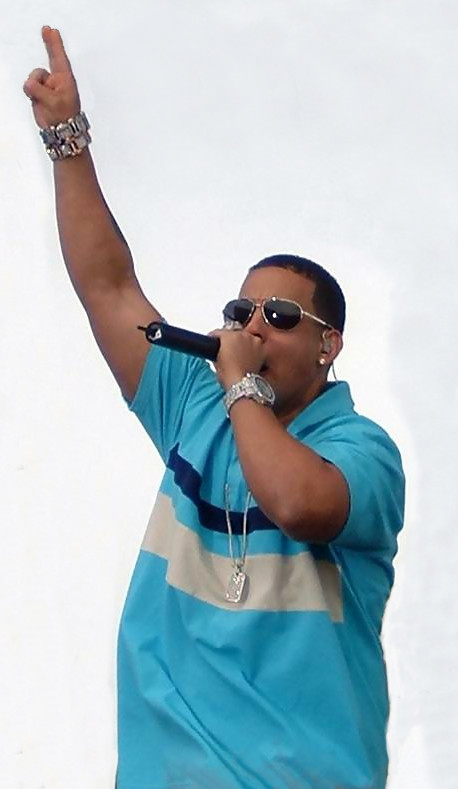
2005 winner Daddy Yankee. He is also the artist with most nominations with six.

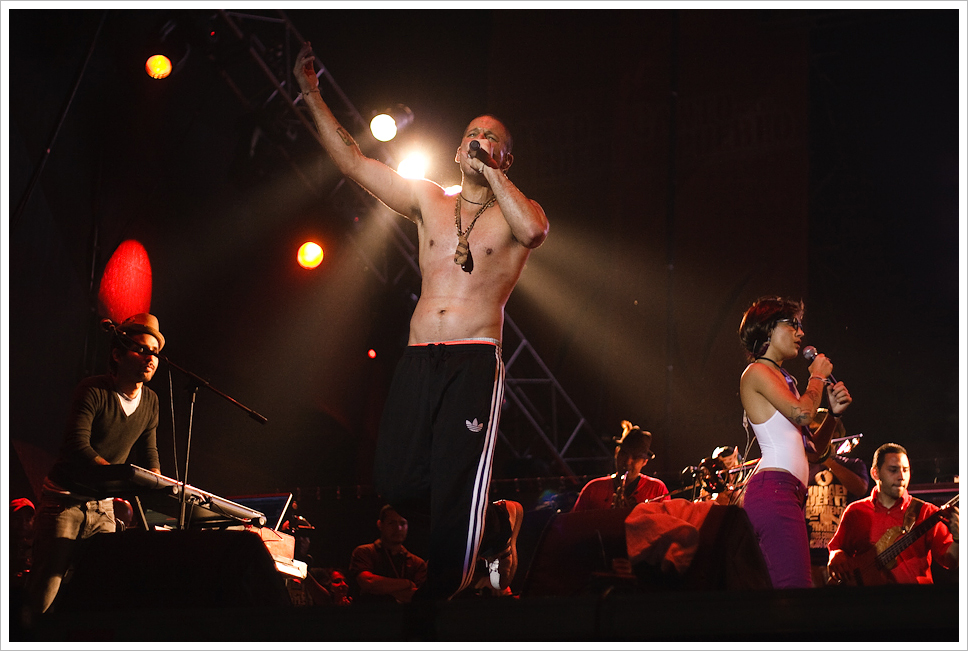
Calle 13 are the most successful act in the category, with five wins.

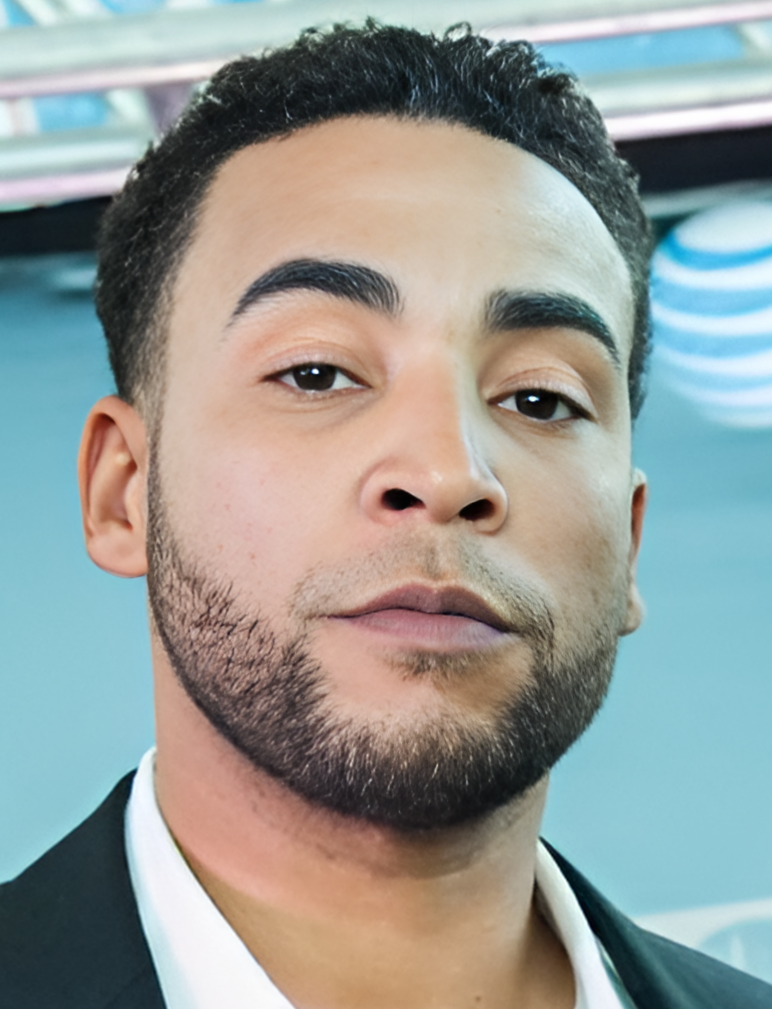
2012 winner Don Omar.

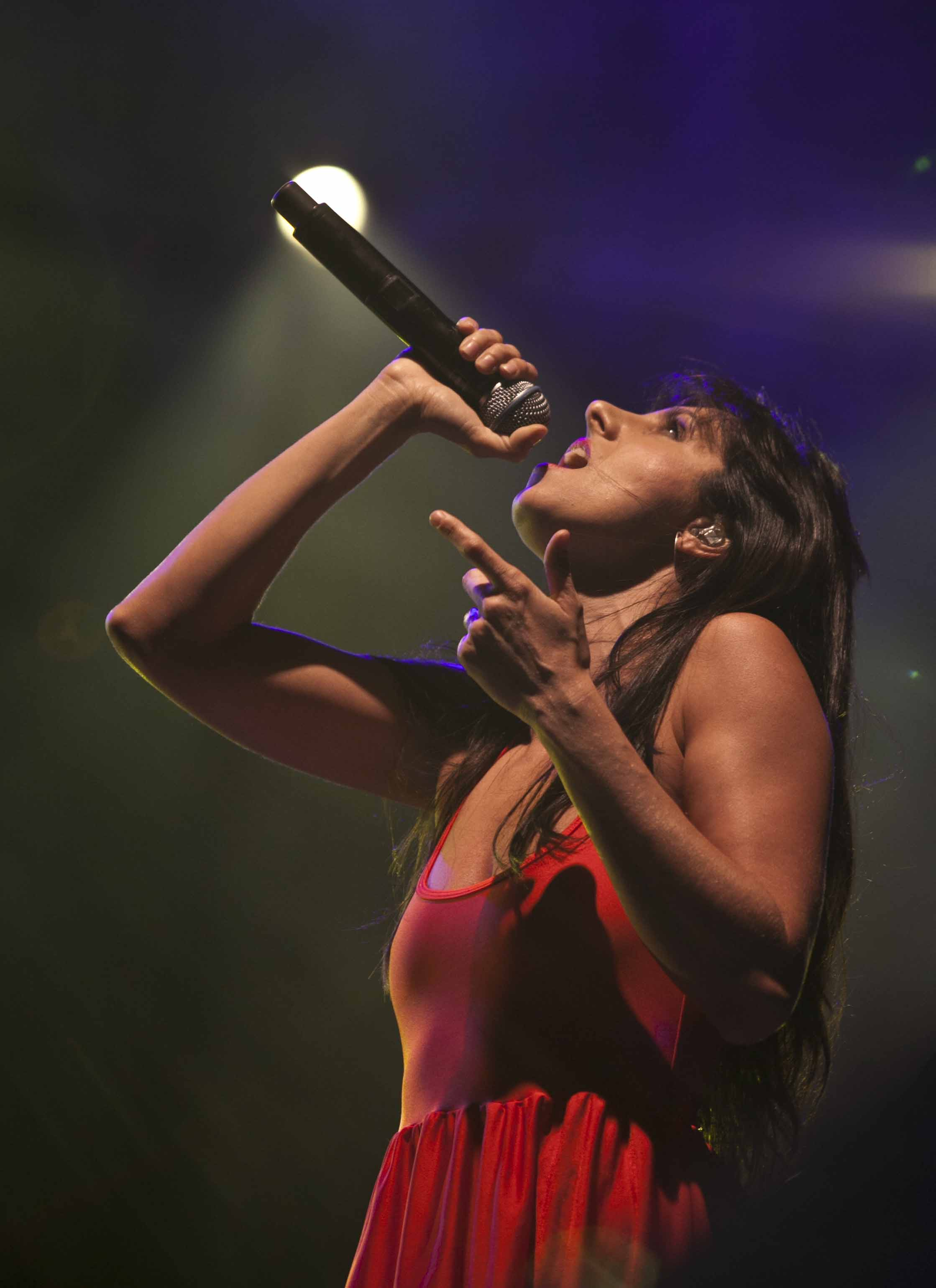
2013 winner Mala Rodríguez.

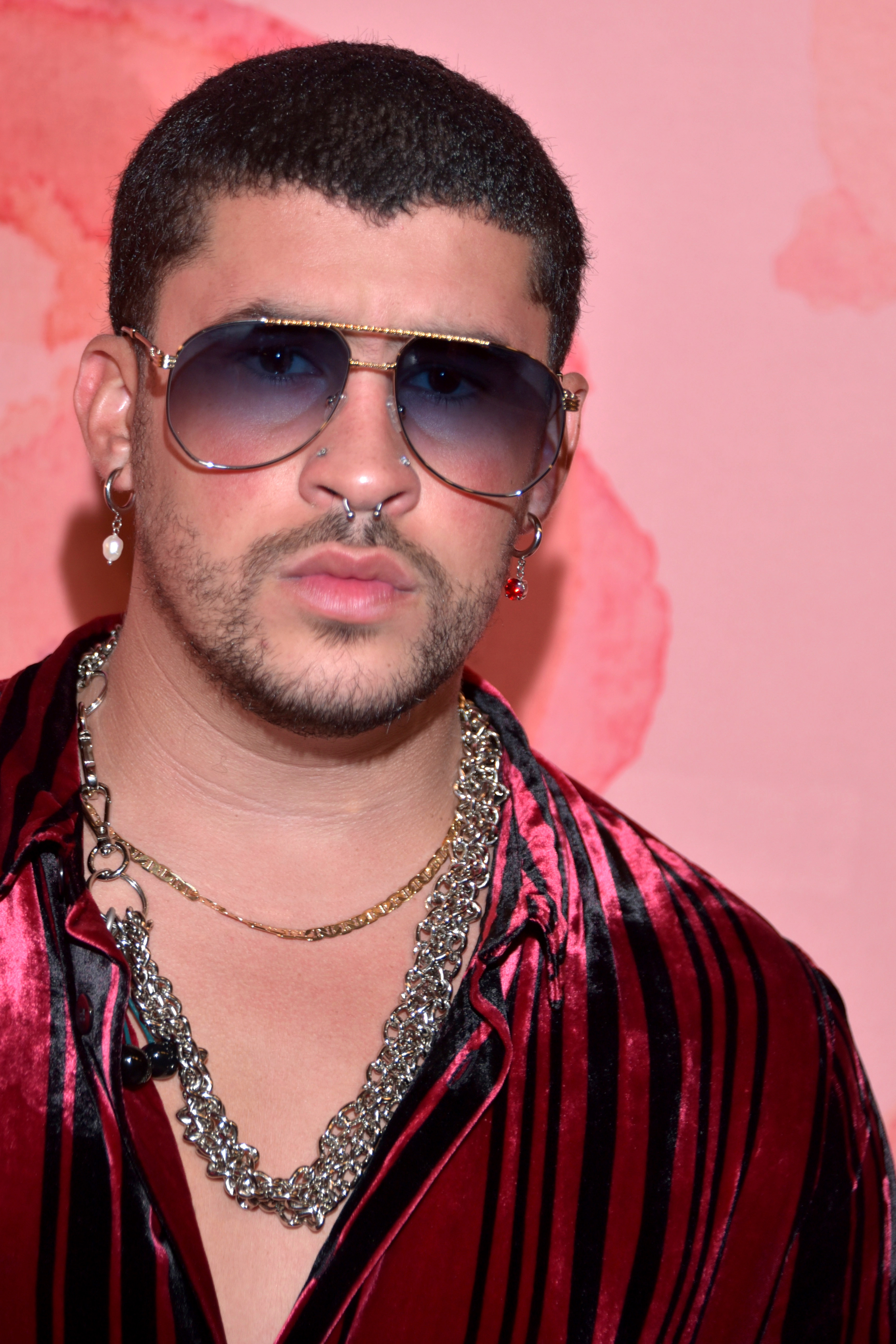
Four-time winner Bad Bunny. He won this award and Album of the Year in 2025.

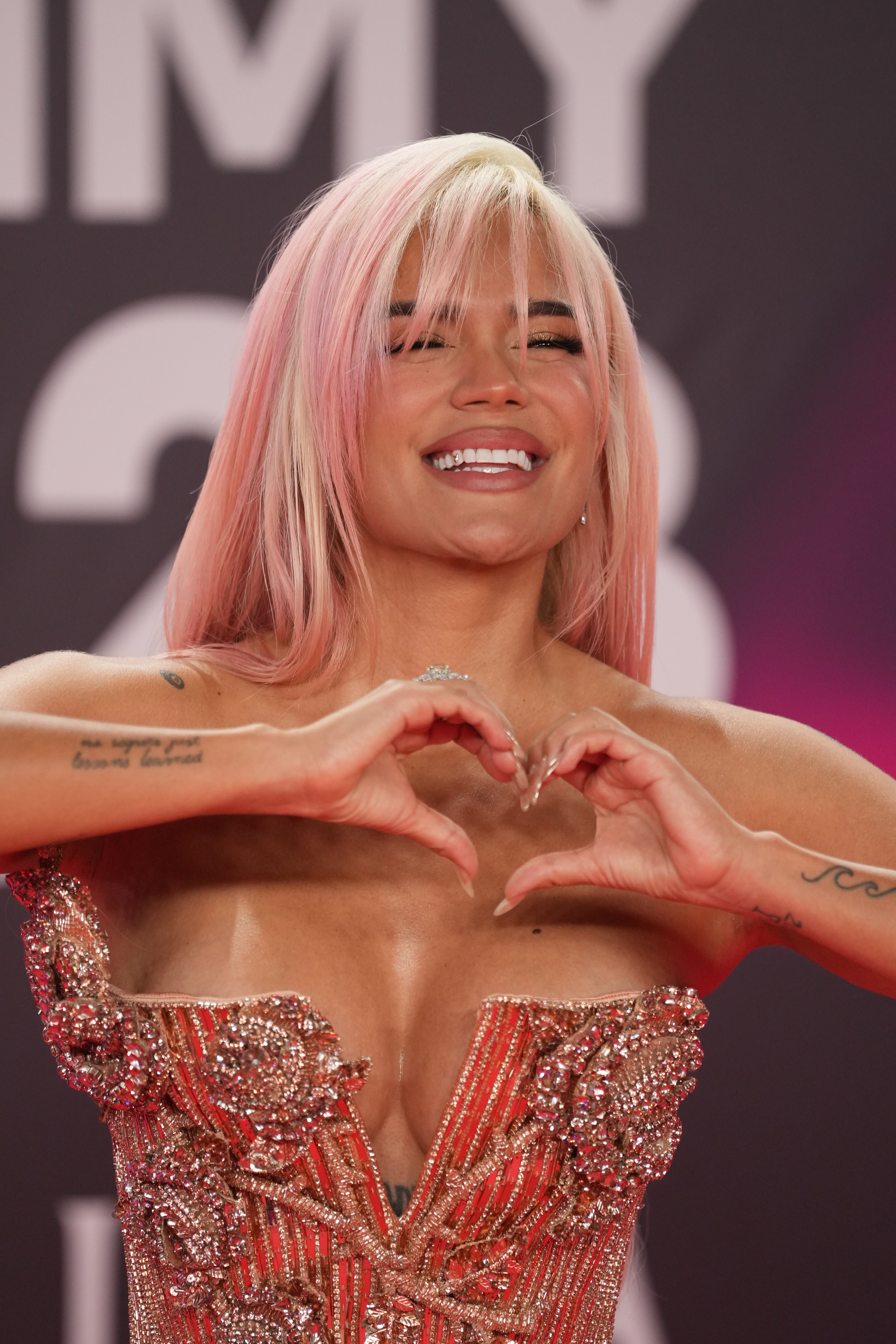
Three-time winner Karol G became the first female artist to win this award and Album of the Year in 2023.

Year	Performing artist(s)	Work	Nominees	Ref.
2001	Sindicato Argentino del Hip Hop	Un Paso a la Eternidad	DJ Kun – Crazy Atorrante; Faces Do Subúrbio – Como É Triste de Olhar; Planet Hemp – A Invasão do Sagaz Homem Fumaça; 7 Notas 7 Colores –La Mami Internacional Presenta: 7 Notas 7 Colores	
2002	Vico C	Vivo	Camorra – Vírus; Nilo MC – Guajiro Del Asfalto; Nocaute – CD Pirata; X Alfonso – X – Moré	
2003	Orishas	Emigrante (Orishas album)	Big Boy – The Phenomenon; Tego Calderón – El Abayarde; Dante – Elevado; El General – El General De Fiesta; Vico C – Emboscada	
2004	Vico C	En Honor A La Verdad	Akwid – Proyecto Akwid; Control Machete – Uno, Dos: Bandera; DJ Kane – DJ Kane; Juan Gotti – No Sett Trippin	
2005	Daddy Yankee	Barrio Fino	Don Omar – The Last Don Live; Luny Tunes – The Kings of the Beats; Orishas – El Kilo; Vico C – Desahogo	
2006	Calle 13	Calle 13	Daddy Yankee – Barrio Fino en Directo; Don Omar – King of Kings; Wisin & Yandel – Pa'l Mundo; Leilah Moreno – V.I.P	
2007	Calle 13	Residente o Visitante	Daddy Yankee – El Cartel: The Big Boss; Orishas – Antidiotico; Ivy Queen – Sentimiento; Mala Rodríguez – Malamarismo	
2008	Wisin & Yandel	Los Extraterrestres	Alexis & Fido – Sobrenatural; Tego Calderón – El Abayarde Contraataca; Flex – Te Quiero: Romantic Style In Da World; Tito El Bambino – It's My Time	
2009	Calle 13	Los de Atrás Vienen Conmigo	Daddy Yankee – Talento de Barrio; Don Omar – iDon; Tito El Bambino – El Patrón; Wisin & Yandel – La Revolución	
2010	Chino & Nacho	Mi Niña Bonita	Cartel de Santa – Sincopa; Daddy Yankee – Daddy Yankee Mundial; La Mala Rodríguez – Dirty Bailarina; Vico C – Babilla	
2011	Calle 13	Entren Los Que Quieran	Don Omar – Meet the Orphans; Pitbull – Armando; Ivy Queen – Drama Queen; Wisin & Yandel – Los Vaqueros: El Regreso	
2012	Don Omar	Don Omar Presents MTO²: New Generation	J Alvarez – Otro Nivel de Música Reloaded; Tego Calderón – The Original Gallo del País; Farruko – The Most Powerful Rookie; Ana Tijoux – La Bala	
2013	Mala Rodríguez	Bruja	Daddy Yankee – Prestige; Ivy Queen – Musa; Tito El Bambino – Invicto; Wisin & Yandel – Líderes	
2014	Calle 13	Multi Viral	Alexis & Fido – La Esencia; J Balvin – La Familia; Yandel – De Líder a Leyenda; Daddy Yankee – King Daddy	
2015	Tego Calderon	El Que Sabe, Sabe	Farruko – Los Menores; Nicky Jam – Greatest Hits, Vol. 1; Don Omar – The Last Don 2; Yandel – Legacy: De Líder a Leyenda Tour (Deluxe Edition)	
2016	J Balvin	Energia	El B – Luz; Emicida – Sobre Crianças, Quadris, Pesadelos e Lições de Casa...; Farruko – Visionary; Arianna Puello – Despierta	
2017	Residente	Residente	J Álvarez – Big Yauran; Kase.O – El Círculo; Arianna Puello – Rap Komunion; Rael – Coisas Do Meu Imaginário	
2018	J Balvin	Vibras	ChocQuibTown – Sin Miedo; Coastcity – Coastcity; Ozuna – Odisea; Tote King – Lebron	
2019	Bad Bunny	X 100pre	Anitta – Kisses; De La Ghetto – Mi Movimiento; Feid – 19; Sech – Sueños	
2020	J Balvin	Colores	Anuel AA – Emmanuel; Bad Bunny – YHLQMDLG; J Balvin and Bad Bunny – Oasis; Feid – FERXXO (VOL. 1: M.O.R); Ozuna – Nibiru; Sech – 1 of 1; Myke Towers – Easy Money Baby	
2021	Bad Bunny	El Último Tour Del Mundo	Akapellah – Goldo Funky; Eladio Carrión – Monarca; Ozuna – ENOC; Myke Towers – Lyke Mike	
2022	Bad Bunny	Un Verano Sin Ti	Akapellah – Respira; Rauw Alejandro – Trap Cake, Vol. 2; Arcángel – Los Favoritos 2.5; María Becerra – Animal	
2023	Karol G	Mañana Será Bonito	Akapellah – Xtassy; Rauw Alejandro – Saturno; Eladio Carrión – 3men2 Kbrn; Feid – Feliz Cumpleaños Ferxxo Te Pirateamos el Álbum; Nicki Nicole – Alma	
2024	Karol G	Mañana Será Bonito (Bichota Season)	Bad Bunny – Nadie Sabe Lo Que Va a Pasar Mañana; Eladio Carrión – Sol María; Álvaro Díaz – Sayonara; Feid – Ferxxocalipsis; Trueno – El Último Baile	
2025	Bad Bunny	Debí Tirar Más Fotos	Fariana – Underwater; Nicki Nicole – Naiki; Papatinho – MPC (Música Popular Carioca); Yandel – Elyte	
2026	Karol G	Tropicoqueta	Bad Gyal – Más Cara; J Balvin and Ryan Castro – Omerta; Beéle – Borondo (5020 Rcrds Sessions); Young Miko – Do Not Disturb: Late Checkout	

== Most Wins ==
6 Wins

- Residente (5 with Calle 13)

5 Wins

- Calle 13

4 Wins

- Bad Bunny

3 Wins

- Karol G
- J Balvin

== Most Nominations ==
7 Nominations

- Daddy Yankee
- Yandel (5 with Winsin and Yandel)

6 Nominations

- J Balvin

5 Nominations

- Bad Bunny
- Calle 13
- Vico C
- Winsin and Yandel

4 Nominations

- Feid

3 Nominations

- Akapellah
- Karol G
- Farruko
- Ivy Queen
- Mala Rodrigues
- Ozuna
- Tito "El Bambino"
- Eladio Carrión

2 Nominations

- Myke Towers
- Rauw Alejandro
- Sech

== See also ==
- Grammy Award for Best Música Urbana Album
- Billboard Latin Music Award for Latin Rhythm Album of the Year
- Lo Nuestro Award for Urban Album of the Year

== Notes ==
^{^[I]} Each year is linked to the article about the Latin Grammy Awards held that year.
^{^[II]} The name of the performer and the nominated album
