= El Heredero =

Studio album by Miguelito
- Released: January 28, 2008
- Recorded: 2007–2008
- Genre: Reggaeton
- Label: El Cartel; Machete

Miguelito chronology
Más Grande Que Tú (2006)	El Heredero (2008)	Los Pitchers (2010)

Singles from El Heredero
- 1. "La Escuela (Mi Primer Amor)" Released: 2007; 2. "Mochila De Amor" Released: 2007; 3. "Al Son Del Boom" Released: 2008

El Heredero is the second studio album by Puerto Rican reggaeton singer Miguelito. Some of the reggaeton artists that accompany him on his album are Divino, Randy, Gol2 and Daddy Yankee. This album was the Best Latin Children Album in the 2008 Latin Grammy Awards.

== Promotion ==
The first single from the album was "La Escuela", whose video was shot in the classrooms of the Antilles Military Academy in Trujillo Alto under the direction of David Impelluso. Under the direction of Georgia Rivera and the photography of Rafy Molinary, Miguelito recorded the video for the single "Mochila de Amor", which he performs alongside Divino. The style of this song is based on bachata and reggaeton. "Al Son Del Boom" featuring Daddy Yankee, was the last single, a "vacilón" song that, according to the young singer, encourages those who are at home to "turn on the radio and dance".

== Track listing ==
#	Title	Producer(s)	Length
1	"Intro"	Luis Colon "Hednocker"	0:57
2	"Game Over"	Miguel Marquez "Escobar"; Raul Santiago "Raidy" Luis Almonte	2:52
3	"La Escuela (Mi Primer Amor)"	Miguel Marquez "Escobar"; Raul Santiago "Raidy"	3:14
4	"Al Son Del Boom" (featuring Daddy Yankee)	Luis Almonte	3:38
5	"El Maltrato"	Luis Almonte	3:15
6	"Mochila De Amor" (featuring Divino)	Mambo Kingz	3:20
7	"Li'l Boss"	Miguel Marquez "Escobar" Andres Arroyo "Zoprano"	3:05
8	"Ella Quiere Mambo"	Luis Almonte	3:27
9	"Asi Sere"	Armando Rosario "Diesel"	3:59
10	"Quieren Ser Como Miguel"	Oscar Lebron "Kalin"	3:27
11	"Put Your Hands Up"	Paul Irizarry "Echo"; Michael Colon "Effect-O"	3:42
12	"Lola" (featuring Goldo Flow)	Urba & Monserrate	3:10
13	"Kakoteo" (featuring La Sista)	Rafael Urbaez "Mercenario"	3:33
14	"Como Un Niño"	Paul Almonte; Luis Almonte	2:45
15	"Tranquilo Huey (Remix)" (featuring Randy)	Raymond Diaz "Memo"	3:28
16	"Montala (Spanglish Remix)"	Raymond Diaz "Memo"	3:07

== Charts ==
Chart (2008)	Peak position
US Latin Rhythm Albums (Billboard)	10

== Awards ==
On November 13, 2008, El Heredero won a Latin Grammy Award for Best Latin Children Album. The Dominican-Puerto Rican singer Miguelito became the youngest recipient in the history of the Latin Grammy Awards.
