= Misión La Cima =

Misión: La Cima

Studio album by Vico C and DJ Negro
- Released: September 18, 1990
- Studio: Lord Studio
- Genre: Puerto Rican hip-hop
- Producers: Jorge Oquendo; Miguel Correa (for Prime Entertainment)

Vico C and DJ Negro chronology
La Recta Final (1990)	Misión: La Cima (1990)	Hispanic Soul (1991)

Misión: La Cima is a hip-hop album released by Puerto Rican singer Vico C. The songs "Me acuerdo", "Viernes 13 (Parte 2)", "She likes my reggae" and "Tony Presidio" are considered standouts. This last track appeared in Aquel Que Había Muerto under the guise of being a new version, and was more popular than the original.

== Track listing ==
- All songs written by Vico C.
1. Misión: La Cima 4:08
2. Mundo Artificial 4:58
3. Me Acuerdo 5:55
4. She Likes My Reggae 4:26
5. El Filósofo 4:33
6. Viernes 13 (Parte 2) 5:50
7. Tony Presidio 4:04
