= El Encuentro =

El Encuentro may refer to:

- El Encuentro (Marcos Witt album), 2002
- El Encuentro (Vico C album), 2006
- El Encuentro (Dino Saluzzi album), 2009
- El Encuentro (Mijares album), 1995
- El Encuentro (prison)
