= Luis Almonte =

- Born: January 19, 1963 (age 62); Baní, Dominican Republic.
- Occupation(s): Record producer, songwriter, audio engineer, mixing engineer
- Instrument(s): Vocals, guitar, keyboards, bass, drums, percussion
- Website: http://www.luisalmonte.com

Luis Almonte (born January 19, 1963) is a Dominican record producer, audio engineer, mixing engineer, multi-instrumentalist, and songwriter. His production, songwriting, and mixing credits include Miguelito, single, which won the 2008 Grammy Award for Grammy Award for Best Latin Urban Album.

== Early life ==
Almonte was born and raised in En Villa Fundacion, Bani Provincia Peravia in Dominican Republic.

== Discography ==
=== Producer and writer discography ===
Release year	Artist	Album	Label
2013	Julio Voltio	Frente a Frente	
2010	Miguelito	"Todo el Mundo"	
2007	Vico C	"Babilla"	
2004	Zion & Lennox	Motivando a la Yal	
