= Echo (producer) =

Puerto Rican record producer and songwriter

- Born: Paul Frederick Irizarry Suau; January 18, 1982 (age 44)
- Origin: Puerto Rico
- Genres: Reggaeton, Hip hop
- Occupations: Record producer; songwriter
- Years active: 2000s–present
- Labels: Insomnio Inc; The Lab Studios; Machete
- Website: www.theechoteam.com

Paul Frederick Irizarry Suau, (born January 18, 1982), known professionally as Echo, is a Puerto Rican record producer and songwriter.

Grammy Award-winning producer and engineer, Paul Irizarry “Echo” has successfully worked for the last 15 years with major urban and pop artists in Latin, mainstream, and European markets.

== Musical career ==
Producing, recording and/or mixing songs and albums for the likes of such artists as: Ricky Martin, Pitbull, London Symphony Orchestra, Tego Calderon, Nicole Scherzinger (Pussycat Dolls), Alek Syntek, Paulina Rubio, Tempo, Daddy Yankee, Don Omar, Ñengo Flow, Cuban Link, Vico C, Divino, Ivy Queen, Thalia, Nina Sky, Wisin & Yandel, Voltio, Tito El Bambino, Farruko, FLEX, Beenie Man, Cultura Profética, Alexis & Fido, Cosculluela, Orishas, Jazze Pha, Obie Bermúdez, Lil Silvio & El Vega, Kevin Florez, Twista, Abraham, Fat Joe, Ariana Puello (Spain), La Mala (Spain), Ojos de Brujo (Spain), PUYA, La Secta, Crooked Steelo, La India, Eddie Dee, Hector “El Father”, y Giovanni Hidalgo to name a few.

Echo's experience and expert knowledge and taste for music have allowed him the opportunity to work in different musical genres and tendencies, ranging from Pop, R&B, Hip Hop, Reggaeton and Christian Music. One of the top professionals in the industry, respected for his talent and accomplishments, known as a leader and pioneer of the Latin urban and reggaeton movement. Echo has received three Latin Grammy Awards, the first two for, as producer and engineer, on 2004 Vico C's (EMI Int'l) 2003 album "En Honor a la Verdad" and the other in 2005 with Daddy Yankee's (UMG) 2004 album "Barrio Fino".

Echo has been nominated for over ten Grammy Awards including Record of the Year. In 2006 Echo became the first producer to ever record the London Symphony Orchestra (LSO) for an urban project, directing a 73-piece full orchestra recording on a hip hop arrangement at Abbey Roads Studios, London for the FREE TEMPO (Sony/BMG) project. Responsible for creating career-making hits for the biggest artists in the urban market like Wisin & Yandel, Tego Calderón, Don Omar, Vico C, Daddy Yankee, Tempo, Ivy Queen and many others. Movies like “The Fast and the Furious 3, 4, 5, and 6 sequel”, “Talento de Barrio”, TV shows “Shark” (HBO), " The L Word (HBO)", games like “Grand Theft Auto IV” as well as advertisement campaigns for Nike, Popular Mortgage, KIA Motors and many others have featured Echo's music and work.

As an accomplished businessman, he currently owns and operates a state of the art recording and production facility in San Juan, Puerto Rico, called THE LAB STUDIOS. From there he leads a world known production team consisting of a handful of young and talented engineers, songwriters, and producers who work with Echo making hits and creating classics on a daily basis. Currently working on new releases by Tego Calderón, De La Ghetto, J King & Maximan, Pitbull and others.

Recently, he has been nominated for the 2020 Latin Grammy Awards for the production of the song "Muchacha" by Gente de Zona and Becky G.

== Discography ==
- Echo Presenta: Invasion (2007)

== Productions Record Labels ==
- 2002: Reggaeton Sex Crew
- 2004: Clase Aparte
- 2004: Barrio Fino
- 2004: En Honor A La Verdad
- 2005: Los Bandoleros
- 2005: Desahogo
- 2006: Los Bandoleros Reloaded
- 2006: Top of the Line
- 2007: El Cartel III: The Big Boss
- 2007: Top of the Line: El Internacional
- 2007: La Iglesia de la Calle
- 2008: Los 4 Fantastikos: Los Presidentes
- 2008: Mi Primer Capitulo
- 2009: El Príncipe
- 2009: El Principe: Ghost Edition
- 2009: IDon
- 2009: Free Tempo
- 2009: Mi Primer Capitulo: Edición Especial
- 2010: Por experiencias Propias
- 2010: Los SuperHeroes
- 2013: Free Music
- 2015: Vendetta
- 2015: Los Reyes Del Rap
