= Emboscada =

Emboscada (Portuguese and Spanish - ambush) may refer to:

- Emboscada, Paraguay, a district of Cordillera Department
- Emboscada (album), of 2002 by Puerto Rican singer Vico C
- Emboscada (historical event), an 1846 Portuguese palace coup
