= Dominican hip-hop =

Form of dance and music in the Dominican Republic

Dominican hip-hop is hip-hop music from the Dominican Republic or hip hop music performed by Dominican artists or artists of Dominican descent. Dominican hip hop employs a blend of Caribbean rhythms same as latin hip-hop.

Dominican hip hop musicians include:

- Arcángel
- DKano
- Lápiz Conciente
- El Sujeto Oro 24
- Toxic Crow
- Rochy RD
- Pablo Piddy
- Del Patio
- Poeta Callejero
- Black Jonas Point
- Cirujano Nocturno
- Shadow Blow
- Mark B
- Nfasis
- Tokischa
- Nipo
- Nico Clínico
- El Fother
- Redimi2
- Romy Ram
- Melymel
- Monkey Black
- Vakero
- Gaudy Mercy
- Mozart La Para
- Villanosam
