= Más Grande Que Tú =

Más Grande Que Tu

Studio album by Miguelito
- Released: January 5, 2007
- Recorded: 2006–2007
- Genre: Reggaeton
- Label: El Cartel; Machete

Miguelito chronology
Más Grande Que Tu (2007)	El Heredero (2008)

Singles from Más Grande Que Tu
- 1. "Ponle el Boom Boom Memo" Released: 2006; 2. "Montala/Montala Remix" Released: 2006/2007

Alternative cover
- Más Grande Que Tú: Special Edition

Singles from Más Grande Que Tú: Special Edition
- 1. "Esto Es Business" Released: 2007

Más Grande Que Tú is the debut studio album by Puerto Rican reggaeton singer Miguelito.

== Track listing ==
#	Title	Producer(s)	Length	Samples
1	"Aqui Llego La Sangre Nueva"	Naldo; DNA; DJ Memo	2:53	
2	"Montala"	DJ Memo	3:24	
3	"Ponle El Boom Boom Memo)"	DJ Memo	3:16	
4	"Sientes Lo Mismo Que Yo"	DJ Memo	2:52	
5	"Bachateando" (featuring Gold2)	Almonte	3:20	
6	"Miguelito Dice"	DJ Memo	2:43	
7	"Acercate"	DJ Memo	3:14	
8	"Bendicion Mami"	Rafi Mercenario	2:47	
9	"Nena Ven"	Almonte	3:35	
10	"Dance Hall"	Almonte	2:24	
11	"El Mahon"	Walde	3:14	
12	"Esto Es Business"	DJ Memo	3:13	
13	"Pegate Aqui"	DJ Memo	3:02	
14	"Lirica De Calle"	Kalyn; Julian	3:09	
15	"Mami Te Invito"	DJ Memo	2:43	
16	"Si O Si Tiene Que Bailar"	Almonte	3:08	
17	"Toma Tra"	Kalyn	2:59	
18	"Montala (Remix)"	DJ Memo	4:24	

== Deluxe Edition ==
#	Title	Producer(s)	Length	Samples
1	"Montala (Remix)"	DJ Memo	4:24	
2	"Sientes Lo Mismo Que Yo" (Unplugged)	DJ Memo	2:52	
3	"Bachatiando"	Almonte	3:20	
4	"Tranquilo Huey"	Almonte	3:27	
5	"Lo Bailas Tu O Lo Bailo Yo"	DJ Memo	3:26	
6	"Nena Ven"	Almonte	3:35	
7	"Bendicion Mami"	Rafi Mercenario	2:47	
8	"Inconciencia"	Almonte	3:14	
9	"Esto Es Business"	DJ Memo	3:13	
10	"Miguelito Dice"	DJ Memo	2:43	
11	"Ponle El Boom Boom Memo)"	DJ Memo	3:16	
12	"Aqui Llego La Sangre Nueva"	Naldo; DNA	2:53	
13	"Dance Hall"	Almonte	2:24	
14	"Lirica De Calle"	Kalyn; Julian	3:09	
15	"Pegate Aqui"	DJ Memo	3:02	
16	"Sientes Lo Mismo Que Yo"	DJ Memo	2:52	
17	"Acercate"	DJ Memo	3:14	
18	"Montala"	DJ Memo	3:24	
19	"El Mahon"	Walde	3:14	
20	"Mami Te Invito"	DJ Memo	2:43	
21	"Si O Si Tiene Que Bailar"	Almonte	3:08	
22	"Toma Tra"	Kalyn	2:59	

== Charts ==
Chart (2007)	Peak position
US Top Latin Albums (Billboard)	16
US Latin Rhythm Albums (Billboard)	7
