= Los Pitchers =

Studio album by Miguelito
- Released: August 4, 2009
- Genre: Reggaeton
- Label: El Cartel

Miguelito chronology
El Heredero (2008)	Los Pitchers (2009)	Todo El Mundo (2010)

Los Pitchers is the collaborative studio album by Puerto Rican reggaeton singer Miguelito and Gold2. It was released on August 4, 2009.

== Track listing ==
#	Title	Producer(s)	Length	Samples
1	"Si Fueramos Adultos"	Arnaldo Santos; Giann Arias; Miguel Valenzuela; Vladimir Felix	4:02	
2	"Muy Ninos"	Edgar W. Semper; Jose Encarnacion; Miguel Valenzuela; Xavier Semper	3:54	
3	"Fiesta"	Leonel Garcia; Nahuel Schajris	3:43	
4	"Old School"	Jose Encarnacion; Miguel Valenzuela; Raffy Mercenario	3:06	
5	"Tu Me Gustas Tanto"	Luis Almonte; Wascar Valenzuela; Yandi	3:44	
6	"La Nena Mas Bella"	Jose Encarnacion; Luis Almonte; Miguel Valenzuela; Wascar Valenzuela	2:46	
7	"Desde Que Te Conoci"	Edgar W. Semper; Jose Encarnacion; Miguel Valenzuela; Xavier Semper	4:01	
8	"Soca Caribena"	Jose Encarnacion; Luis Almonte; Miguel Valenzuela; Wascar Valenzuela	3:40	
9	"Mirame A La Cara"	Luis Almonte; Wascar Valenzuela; Yandi	3:15	
10	"No Llores"	Edgar W. Semper; Jose Encarnacion; Miguel Valenzuela; Xavier Semper; Yandi	3:18	
11	"Sigueme Los Pasos"	Edgar W. Semper; Jose Encarnacion; Miguel Valenzuela; Xavier Semper	3:30	
12	"Me Pidieron Que La Monte"	Jose Encarnacion; Miguel Valenzuela; Raymond Diaz Bruno	3:27	
13	"Alguien Como Tu"	Luis Almonte; Wascar Valenzuela; Yandi; 3:45		

== Charts ==
Chart (2009)	Peak position
US Latin Rhythm Albums (Billboard)	10
