= Ruben DJ =

Puerto Rican rapper

- Born: Rubén Urrutia; May 7, 1967 (age 59)
- Origin: San Juan, Puerto Rico
- Genres: Reggaeton; Puerto Rican hip-hop
- Years active: 1985–present

Rubén Urrutia (born May 7, 1967), better known as Ruben DJ, is a Puerto Rican former rap star who became famous in the late 1980s with the hit song "La Escuela".

== Career ==
Rubén was interested in dancing and music from an early age. When he was a teenager, he began singing at local parties in the Luis Lloréns Torres and Torres de Sabana housing projects. When he was 15 years old, PepsiCo made him an offer to sing and dance, but his mother declined it since he was a minor.

Rubén was working as a griller at a restaurant, called "Ponderosa", when he decided to call X-100, a local radio station, to ask them if they would play one of his tapes. When they did, promoter Zaida Morales was impressed and offered him a record deal. Rubén then quit his job and dedicated fully to music. He said in an interview "I quit my job, had problems at home, I spent six months promoting all over Puerto Rico with the same cap, the same pants; I lost my car, I had a Datsun that was all junk. It was tough."

Rubén DJ's album was produced by Rubén DJ and DJ Joel and released in 1989, and the song "La Escuela" became an instant hit in Puerto Rico. At the moment, underground Puerto Rican rap was becoming popular in the island and Rubén's song, along with Vico C, Brewley MC, and others, is considered to be among the most influential ones for the genre. "La Escuela" was a motivational song, encouraging children to stay in school, which broadened its appeal to the general public.

Ruben DJ himself became a celebrity nationwide in Puerto Rico, appearing on the covers of magazines, television shows, and newspapers. He toured all over Latin America and the United States with "La Escuela", and performed in Spain and other points of Europe. It was nominated for Rap Artist of the Year at the Lo Nuestro Awards of 1993.

With time, Rubén DJ's fame began to decline. Although he had other hits, like Ponte El Sombrero, Si Te Gusta el Hueso!, Todo Movido, Dame D'eso, Planeta Platano, Feliz Navidad, and other singles.

In the late 90s, Rubén hosted a musical segment in Telemundo's El Show de las 12.

Rubén decided to go to college, and graduated with a degree in Information Systems. After founding his own company, he was hired by local newspaper El Nuevo Día to work as a videographer. In 2010, Urrutia recorded a documentary called Taíno Vive where he visits communities of people that follow the Taíno people lifestyle. That same year, he received an honorific mention at the Certamen de Fotoperiodismo of the Puerto Rican Newscasters Association.

According to an interview, Rubén is planning to record again.

== See also ==
- List of Puerto Ricans
