= Hispanic Soul =

Studio album by Vico C
- Released: August 13, 1991
- Recorded: 1991; Unicornio Studio
- Genre: Puerto Rican hip-hop
- Length: 40:59
- Label: Prime Records

Vico C chronology
Misión La Cima (1990)	Hispanic Soul (1991)	Traigo La Bomba (1992)

Hispanic Soul is the debut studio album released by Puerto Rican singer Vico C released on 1991 by Prime Records. Recorded at Unicornio Studios, the album is credited, along with his previous EP La Recta Final (1990) and Misión La Cima (1990), to take the hip-hop movement in Puerto Rico, known as "Rap en Español", from underground to international exposure. Eventually, the album reached number 10 on US Billboard Tropical/Salsa and was his first album to be officially distributed in Latin America. Following the success of the album, he was nominated for the 1992 Lo Nuestro Awards.

The track "Bomba Para Afincar" is considered one of Vico C's greatest hits. The song integrates Caribbean rhythms without relinquishing his social messages and is considered to be one of the first musical examples of the evolution of reggae en Español and the creation of reggaeton.

== Track listing ==
No.	Title	Length
1.	"Tradición (Radio Version)"	4:19
2.	"Te Voy a Tomar"	4:03
3.	"Bomba Para Afincar"	3:34
4.	"Yogurt"	4:04
5.	"No Podemos Fingir"	5:02
6.	"I Like It"	3:45
7.	"Dulce, Sexy, Sensual"	3:23
8.	"La Inglesa"	3:21
9.	"Quitarme Tu Amor"	3:57
10.	"Tradición (Long Version)"	5:26
Total length:		40:59

== Credits and personnel ==
The following credits are from AllMusic and from the Hispanic Soul liner notes:

- Arranger, Composer, Primary Artist: Vico C
- Scratching: DJ Negro
- Executive Producer: Miguel Corréa
- Arranger, Editing, Mixing, Producer, Recording Technician, Vocals (Background): Baron Lopez
- Executive Producer: Jorge Oquendo
- Arranger, Compilation Producer, Keyboard Programming: Eduardo Reyes
- Percussion: Freddy Camacho
- Arranger: Israel Raynoso Casado
- Mixing: Efraim DeLuna
- Percussion: Angel Diaz
- Vocals (Background): Lizzy Estrella
- Vocals (Background): Angel Lopez
- Vocals (Background): Viviane Louro Martinez
- Trumpet: Pedro Mateo
- Mixing, Recording Technician: Diana Ortiz
- Percussion: Emilio Perez
- Guitar: Chebi Rodriguez
- Art Direction, Design: Karla Silva
- Vocals (Background): Laura Soto
- Bass: Ramon Vazquez

== Charts ==
Chart (1992)	Peak position
US Tropical Albums (Billboard)	10
