= Todo El Mundo =

Studio album by Miguelito
- Released: June 22, 2010
- Genre: Reggaeton
- Length: 33:51
- Label: CdA

Miguelito chronology
Los Pitchers (2009)	Todo El Mundo (2010)

Todo El Mundo is the third studio album by Puerto Rican reggaeton singer Miguelito. It was released on June 22, 2010.

== Track listing ==
#	Title	Producer(s)	Length	Samples
1	"No Lo Se"	Nahuel Schajris; Claudio Brad; Luis Almonte	4:12	
2	"Luces, Camara, Accion"	Tingui; Miguelito; Keko; Lu	3:34	
3	"Oh Yeah"	Tingui; Miguelito; New Rhythms	2:50	
4	"Maquinando"	Tingui; Miguelito; Luis Almonte	3:25	
5	"Miguelitio Invita"	Tingui; Miguelito; DJ Nelson	3:02	
6	"Llego El Querendon"	Tingui; Miguelito; New Rhythms	3:12	
7	"Por Nada En El Mundo"	Nahuel Schajris; New Rhythms	3:20	
8	"Nada Como Tu"	Tingui; Miguelito; New Rhythms	3:49	
9	"Tu La Ve"	Tingui; Miguelito; New Rhythms	3:14	
10	"Todo Es Posible"	Tingui; Miguelito; Escobar	3:13	

== Charts ==
Chart (2010)	Peak position
US Top Latin Albums (Billboard)	47
US Latin Rhythm Albums (Billboard)	7
