= Echo Presenta: Invasión =

Echo Presenta: Invasión Vol.1

Compilation album by Echo
- Released: July 24, 2007
- Recorded: 2007
- Genre: Reggaeton, hip hop
- Label: The Lab Studios, Insomio inc, Machete Music/VI Music
- Producer: Echo (Exec.); Diesel; Jazze Pha; Nesty "La Mente Maestra"; Victor "El Nasi"; Yai & Toly(los Nativos); DJ Giann; Dexter & Mista Greenz; Santana; DJ Memo; Mambo Kingz; Urba & Monserrate

Echo Presenta: Invasión is a compilation album by reggaeton producer Echo, released on July 24, 2007, with participation of Don Omar, Daddy Yankee, among others. The single "Delirando" by Wisin & Yandel, reached position 30 and 36 on the Billboard Tropical Airplay and Latin Rhythm charts respectively.

== Track listing ==
1. "Intro" - Daddy Yankee, Don Omar, Cosculluela, Héctor el Father, Chyno Nyno, Jowell & Randy, Arcángel, & Julio Voltio (produced by Echo & Diesel)
2. "Mi Nena" - Don Omar (produced by Echo & Diesel)
3. "Delirando" - Wisin & Yandel (produced by Nesty & Victor)
4. "Caliente" - Daddy Yankee ft. Jazze Pha
5. "Ando Ready" - Héctor el Father
6. "No Juegues Más" - Jowell & Randy (produced by Dj Giann, Dexter & Mr. Greenz, & Echo)
7. "Sientan La Presión" - Arcángel (produced by DJ Giann)
8. "Carita de Ángel" - Angel & Khriz (produced by Santana)
9. "Como Toda Una Señora" - Dalmata
10. "La Calle Llora" - Cosculluela ft. Mexicano
11. "Ilógico" - Los Yetzons ft. Alexis (produced by Mambo Kingz)
12. "Yal, Yal, Toma" - Voltio
13. "Una Cita" - Zion & Lennox
14. "Acomódate" - Fussion Musik
15. "Me Gustas Tú" - Divino
16. "Déjala Sola" - Yaga & Mackie
17. "Siente El Swing" - JQ
18. "Baila Lento" - Klaze & Eztylo
19. "Camina Derecho" - Cosculluela
20. "Zumbenme" - Chyno Nyno
21. "Siéntelo" - MJ (produced by Mambo Kingz)
22. "Como Yo" - TNT
23. [*]"Me Tienta" - Jayko (produced by Nesty & Victor)

[*] Indicates a Hidden Track.

Note: The song "Mi Nena" by Don Omar was used as the soundtrack of the film Fast & Furious in 2009.

== Chart performance ==
Chart (2007)	Peak position
U.S. Billboard 200	188
U.S. Billboard Latin Rhythm Albums	3
