= The Files: The Greatest Hits =

Greatest hits album by Vico C
- Released: March 23, 2004
- Genre: Hip-hop

Vico C chronology
| En Honor a la Verdad (2003) | The Files: The Greatest Hits (2004) | Desahogo (2005) |

The Files: The Greatest Hits is a compilation album released by Puerto Rican hip-hop singer Vico C.

== Track listing ==
1. "Tony Presidio"
2. "Emboscada"
3. "X-Plosión"
4. "Aquel Que Había Muerto"
5. "Viernes 13"
6. "Bomba Para Afincar"
7. "En Honor A La Verdad"
8. "She Likes My Reggae"
9. "5 De Septiembre" (Acoustic Version)
10. "Quieren"
11. "El Bueno, El Malo, Y El Feo" (Dance Hall Version)
12. "Cosa Nuestra"
13. "La Recta Final" (Nueva Version)
14. "Super Héroe"

== Song meanings ==
- "Viernes 13" (In English, "Friday the 13th") was one of the first hits from Vico C. It features Vico C and his girlfriend running from Jason Voorhees, the killer from the Friday the 13th films.
- "5 de Septiembre" (In English, "September 5th") is dedicated to Vico C's daughter. It's her birthdate and it talks of how he feels about not being with her during her childhood.
- "El Bueno, El Malo, y el Feo" (In English, "The Good, the Bad and the Ugly") features Eddie Dee and Tego Calderón personifying "The Good", "The Bad" and "The Ugly" respectively. Vico C himself personifies "The Good". The song talks of how different people react to different things in the music business.
