= Dos Tiempos Bajo Un Mismo Tono =

Compilation album by Vico C and Jossie Esteban
- Released: January 18, 1994
- Genre: Puerto Rican hip-hop
- Label: RCA

Vico C and Jossie Esteban chronology
Xplosión (1993)	Dos Tiempos Bajo Un Mismo Tono (1994)	Con poder (1996)

Dos Tiempos Bajo Un Mismo Tono is a Puerto Rican hip-hop album released by Puerto Rican singer Vico C and Jossie Esteban in 1990 in Puerto Rico by Prime Records and BMG on 1990 and on January 18, 1994 by RCA Records in the United States. It is a compilation of six of Vico C's previous hits and two new songs. In the first song titled "Blanca", appear Jossie Esteban y la Patrulla 15, being a great hit in Latin America. Also, they appear in the song "Que Cante La Esperanza".

== Track listing ==
No.	Title	Length
1.	"Blanca"
2.	"Mundo Artificial"
3.	"El Amor Existe"
4.	"La Recta Final"
5.	"Que Cante la Esperanza"
6.	"Me Acuerdo"
7.	"She Likes My Reggae"
8.	"Viernes 13, Pt. 1"
