= Puerto Rican hip-hop =

Music genre from Puerto Rico

- Stylistic origins: Hip-hop; conscious hip-hop; hardcore hip-hop; Old-school hip-hop
- Cultural origins: Mid 1980s, Puerta de Tierra, San Juan, Puerto Rico, U.S.
- Typical instruments: Drum machine; Sampler; Synthesizer; Vocals

Fusion genres
- Reggaeton

Puerto Rican hip-hop or Puerto Rican rap (also referred to as rap/hip-hop locally or hip-hop en Español in Spanish) is an underground subgenre of hip-hop music and conscious hip-hop that originated in Puerto Rico. At its peak in the late 1980s and early 1990s, it was one of the most popular styles of underground music in Puerto Rico sold by the mixtape. Puerto Rican hip-hop during its ascension in the late 1980s, and even during its earliest form, explored and touched on taboo and non-taboo societal themes in Puerto Rico like drug abuse, rising crime, governmental corruption, STDs, and sexual abuse. Due to its local relative niche and factors early on in the 1990s, it did not experience as much commercial success on par as other more popular Latin contemporary music such as reggaeton.

The first ever Puerto Rican hip-hop song to go on the local radio, TV, and vinyl officially was the single "Las Drogas Matan" (1987) by D-Squad (Don Figgaro) and DJ Baron Lopez. However, it wasn't the first Puerto Rican hip-hop song as earlier artists had pioneered it a biennium before. Vico C is the pioneer of Puerto Rican hip-hop. He was also the first to pioneer the modern urbano genre, reggaeton, with "Bomba Para Afincar" from his hip-hop album Hispanic Soul circa 1991. Vico C set the first ever Puerto Rican hip-hop song with the making of "El Rapeo del Vikingo", recorded and distributed the same year, 1985, at 14 years old. Inspired by Run DMC and Sugar Hill, in 1984 he formalized his career by calling himself Vico, adding the 'C' just as a novelty. Although he had already gained popularity with Viernes 13' alongside Rubén DJ, it was with La Recta Final that he became the number-one rapper in Puerto Rico.

== Origins ==
=== Early influences (late 1970s-1980s) ===
During the early days of hip-hop in 1972, marginalized black and Afro-Caribbean communities (along with Nuyorican communities in the Bronx) started producing the hip-hop movement. What at first was a coping mechanism to their environment of marginalization and poverty, an anti-drug, anti-violence social movement began a musical revolution in the Bronx. American Artists like DJ Kool Herc, Africa Bambaataa, DJ Disco Wiz laid the groundworks of the hip-hop movement, while groups like Rock Steady Crew contribute heavily to the breakdancing movement, adding their contributions to the multicultural movement. Despite circulating beliefs saying "Puerto Ricans co-created hip-hop", old-school hip-hop and the hip-hop movement in general was an African-American movement based on African-American music in the United States inherent to the intrinsic roots of African-American people. However, it is equally important to include the indispensable contributions of Nuyoricans that played a role in the shaping of American hip-hop.

In the 1960s and 1970s, the Bronx was a hotbed of crime with warring gangs going after each other's throats, and the Bronx itself was the battlefield of all of it. Until the gang pact Hoe Avenue peace meeting was catalyzed after the death of Afro-Nuyorican-Jewish founder of street gang/band leader, Benjamin Melendez (Also known as "Black Benjie") in honor of Black Benjie trying to stop a gang fight. Several dangerous and notorious gangs such as the Savage Skulls, the Ghetto Brothers, the Black Spades, the Tomahawks, Latin Kings, and many more came together to this single spot to arrange a truce to end all gang-on-gang violence, instead replacing the violence with dancing, rap competitions, DJing, and graffiti. Afrika Bambaataa played a key role in this meeting, whom set the terms and foundation of the hip-hop movement. He was a member of the Black Spades African-American street gang.

=== The local underground movement (mid-1980s) ===
Puerto Rican hip-hop began to emerge as a localized genre on the island in the late 1980s following the Hip-hop boom in the Bronx. The concept of rhyming is nothing new to the rich patrimonial musical history of Puerto Rico, native genres like Plena already had that aspect of improvisational rhyme and poesy that were already extant in Puerto Rican music. The initial movement was led by Puerto Rican hip-hop pioneer, Vico C. Although in Puerto Rico it is widely believed Rubén DJ was the first Puerto Rican Hip-hop rapper to release a Spanish language hip hop track with "La Escuela", evidence shows that in 1985, Vico C recorded the song "El Rapeo Del Vikingo" at DJ Negro's apartment in La Perla, predating Rubén DJ's "La Escuela" release.

Vico C was the first rapper of the Puerto Rican Rap scene. Inspired by American hip-hop rapper groups Run-DMC (hardcore hip-hop) and the Sugar Hill Gang (old-school hip-hop), he sought to bring the hip-hop movement to Puerto Rico beginning as early as 14 years old selling singles by the tapes in 1985 with the help of his mentor DJ Negro. He sold them block by block at 10$ USD as clandestine mixtapes together with DJ Negro. Due to the fact DJ Negro owned a car he'd often outpace selling Vico C's mixtapes compared to Vico C himself. Vico C truly started taking off when he found hisself a manager with intricate connections (Miguel Correa, owner of Prime Records label) and produced one of his biggest hits yet, his album Dos Tiempos Bajo Un Mismo Tono. According to Vico hisself in an interview on a local talkshow, he states that his album had sold around 50,000 to 60,000 copies in Puerto Rico alone at that time (1989). By the time 1989 came around, rap peaked with "Sida Rap" by Puerto Rican rapper Brewley MC.

=== Antecedence of Puerto Rican hip-hop (early 1985) ===
In 1985, about the same time Vico C started his first songs with the help of DJ Negro, DJ Negro unsuccessfully permanently started a nightclub he named The Noise. The club had several unsuccessful shutdowns until a permanent reopening venture in the early 1990s was set by DJ Negro. Later on during The Noise's third and permanent reopening around the early 1990s, the venture became the birth place of the precursor to reggaeton, Únderground, or better known at the time as Únder. Some of The Noise's early contributors like Baby Rasta & Gringo took inspiration from Vico C. The discotheque retired in 2004.

Félix Rodríguez (known as DJ Negro) was raised in La Perla in an old ranch now apartment shack. His strict father worked the shipyard in the ports of San Juan and from a young age DJ Negro was inculcated an entrepreneurial uprising. Félix Rodríguez would sell hot dogs in front of his patio porch in order to make a buck, but his professional trajectory would change the day his father bought him a DJ-style mixing console. From day one, Félix would monetize and build up his then amateur DJ skills. His father kicks him out of his house at around late 1985 after DJing for a wedding party, when he arrived home at 2 AM his father broke the news to him. Following his eviction, DJ Negro began living in an apartment in Puerta de Tierra. The apartment manager and owner owned a locale just below his apartment and upon recognizing DJ Negro he lends the locale's keys to him where DJ Negro would start hosting DJ parties. In his DJ parties, Félix (DJ Negro) had the idea of rap competitions. It would attract lots of rappers that would rap in English. In the same day that Félix began hosting rap competitions he'd run into Vico C rapping in a duo called VG Princes in 1985. His friend Glenn rapped in English while Vico C rapped in Spanish. They won the competition after it concluded and they had won 15$. Impressed by Vico C's talent, due to the fact nobody rapped in Spanish like him, he left his duo by suggestion of DJ Negro and they then would begin to work together professionally. DJ Negro would become Vico C's DJ throughout his development as a pioneering Puerto Rican rapper throughout Puerto Rican Hip-Hop in the Mid 80s.

=== Commercial success of Puerto Rican hip-hop in the late 1980s ===
With the unexpected hit rap song "Viernes 13", a psychological horror hip-hop song, DJ Negro and Vico C were self-made rising stars. The song became so popular, it became a staple on being played every Friday the 13th starting in 1987. Vico C's earlier work during the 80s opened doors to inspire other Puerto Rican rappers that wanted to follow his steps. Some of these would be TNT with "TNT Se Roba El Show", Lisa M with "Trampa" or "La Segunda Cita", Brewley MC with "Sida Rap", Rubén DJ with "La Escuela". The success got to DJ Negro and consequently had him splurging; hanging out with people and going out, until eventually DJ Negro runs out of money and starts selling hot dogs again in a two to three month time interval. When DJ Negro was selling hot dogs one day he would bump into the owner of a local cafeteria in Puerta de Tierra called "Joseph Café" and has always wanted DJ Negro to play music at his café, they agreed on a price and then DJ Negro would pack Joseph Café. Later on DJ Negro would be let go due to his prices and another DJ got hired. To compete with Joseph Café, DJ Negro opened up discothèque The Noise.

=== The Noise ===
While The Noise itself was the cradle of Únderground, it played a fundamental role in shifting the trajectory of Puerto Rican Hip-Hop. The first location of The Noise was financed by his brother after he unsuccessfully convinced his friends to help him finance the original location. For 4,000$ they agreed on a 50/50 split of the discothèque income and thus began the original establishment of The Noise. Félix began promoting his club at Joseph Café until he was kicked from there by the bouncers, that alone was enough to bring fans to his club due to the fact Félix was already a famed DJ. Besides hosting the disco parties hisself, DJ Negro would hire a couple of artists to the disco, such as DJ Joe, DJ Eric, and DJ Tony Touch. DJ Eric would play a fundamental role in hooking DJ Negro up with singers and rappers like Kid Power Posse and Big Boy whom would begin popularizing The Noise making music of their own, which would eventually lead to the beginning of music production in The Noise. Due to noise complains from neighbours, Félix had to close the first establishment of The Noise and with the money he made off of his first establishment he would purchase a newer, larger location for The Noise. In the auguration of the 2nd establishment of The Noise, DJ Eric out of spite didn't arrive. DJ Joel, Ruben DJ's DJ just so happened to be in the queue and Félix requested he played at the inauguration. After his performance, Félix would hire him. Several artists would be made themselves known in the 2nd opening of The Noise producing music; Falo, Maicol & Manuel, Ranking Stone, Wiso G, DJ Baby J, and Baby Cat. The 2nd place would close due to not having a permit to sell liquor, had been accumulating infractions, and he would be given a date to close. At closing day, DJ Playero would introduce a 15 year old boy to DJ Negro to give him a chance, so DJ Negro let the young boy sing and had to cut the mic cable due to the fact that he wouldn't stop singing. The young boy's pseudonym went by Daddy Yankee. Eight months later.. Playero 37 releases, this inspires DJ Negro to adapt to DJ Playero releasing music by Volumes. DJ Negro would then reopen The Noise where it originally was located in a locale just below the apartment where he originally lived after his father kicked him out, he would start doing rap competitions again. From those rap competitions he found; Baby Rasta & Gringo and Las Guanábanas, Bebe & Pon, and an important figure in Puerto Rican rap Lito & Polaco. With those artists he would go on and produce The Noise Vol. 1. Baby Rasta & Gringo grew up on Puerto Rican Hip-Hop early on. Únderground was starting to become a popular style of music at this time, eventually it would overtake Puerto Rican Hip-Hop in popularity.

=== The divide and rivalry in the 1990s to early 2000s ===
As Reggaeton began to overtake Puerto Rican hip-hop in popularity, MCs would be forced to either ride with the flow and adapt to reggaeton or get left behind from the popularity Reggaeton would be producing in its golden era. Essentially because Hip-hop en Español wasn't "danceable" enough at the discos, it didn't take off as much as Reggaeton did and it was all a matter of commercialization, something early MCs hadn't caught on to. Puerto Rican MCs disdained Únderground as a result of the crude lyricism fomented by the genre, they considered themselves superior to reggaeton and its likeness because of the simple fact that they had more thorough lyricism.

=== No Mel Syndicate ===
As a response to other reggaeton syndicates such as The Noise and DJs like DJ Playero harming the foundation and culture of the Puerto Rican hip-hop movement, a group of hip-hop artists in Puerto Rico established a Puerto Rican hip-hop collective called No Mel Syndicate in Carolina. No Mel Syndicate existed just before reggaeton was called rap/reggae in Puerto Rico, and just before reggaeton was called its respective name, in a given moment in Puerto Rico it was called Melasa, referring to the fact that the genre caught on quickly, like a sweet, viscous material such as syrup. These rappers in No Mel Syndicate were constituted by rappers that were outraged by the Melasa movement, influenced by the old-school long before Rubén DJ and Vico C. They named themselves "No Mel Syndicate" because it was a way to express 'No Melasa', i.e. the 'No Reggaeton Syndicate'. Some of the rappers that made up No Mel Syndicate were Gunzmoke, Coo-Kee, Sanguinario, New Style Society, Mexicano 777 and Lord Khelo. When hip-hop rappers from No Mel Syndicate would collaborate in Reggaeton songs often they would prefer to produce the songs themselves. Coo-Kee would produce for other Hip-Hop artists like Lito & Polaco, MC Ceja, and Tego Calderón. The divide between Reggaeton and Hip-Hoppers would hurt their movement in the long run founded solely on insulation from reggaeton and a very apparent hate for it. In short, they opposed evolving and actually promoting themselves, commercializing. and so Reggaeton started gaining more and more popularity amid the people of Puerto Rico while the Hip-Hop movement stayed underground.

=== Modern-day status ===
The Puerto Rican hip-hop movement continues to produce music despite its underground status and recognition. Some of the typical known hip-hop artists include Lito & Polaco, MC Ceja, Siete Nueve, Intifada, Vico C, No Mel Syndicate, Velcro MC, and Temperamento.

== Characteristics of Puerto Rican hip-hop ==
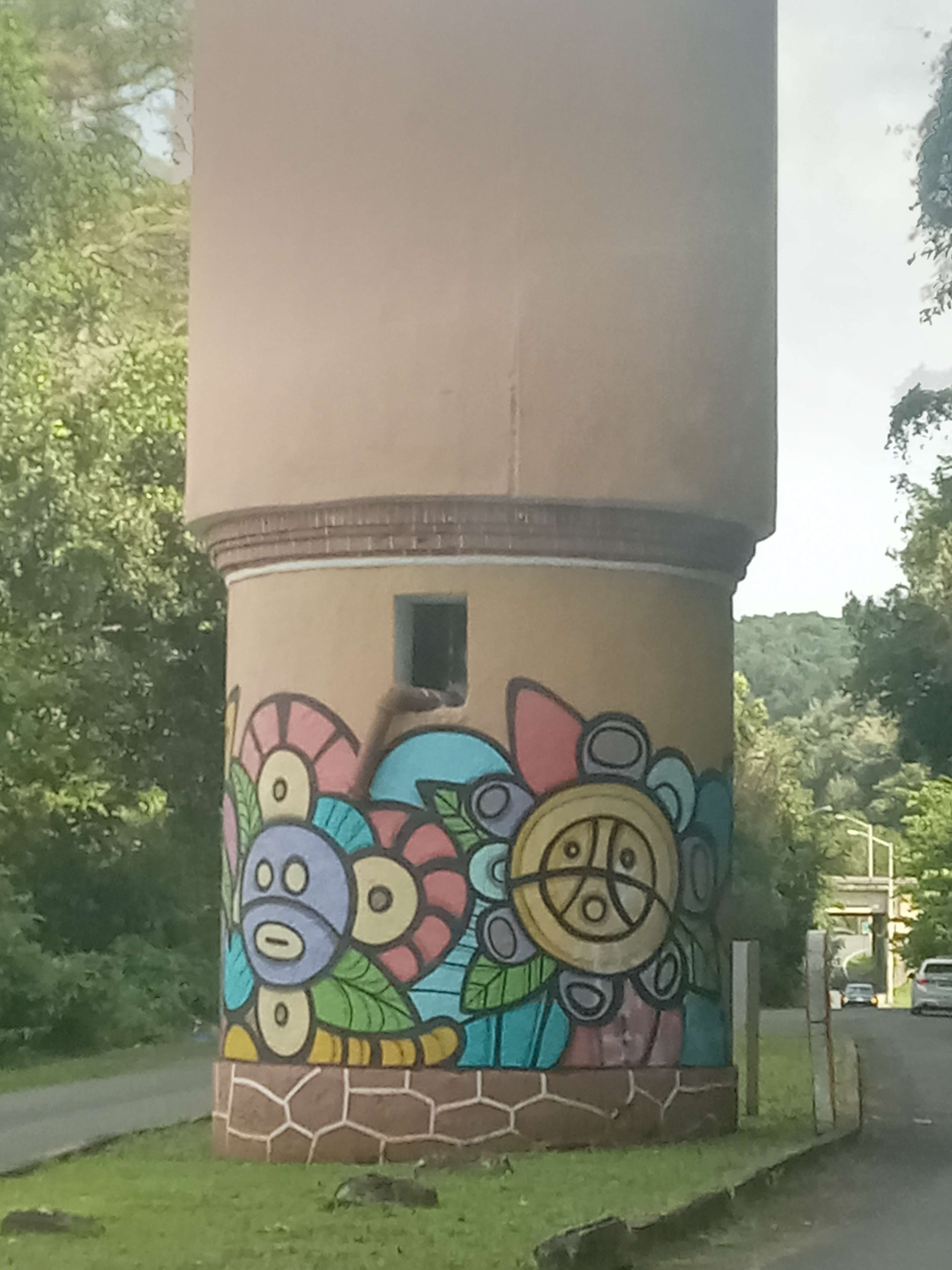
Entrance structure to Túnel de Guajataca containing graffiti artwork with native Taíno symbols.

Puerto Rican hip-hop varies from artist to artist but, in general, borrows rhythm from American hip-hop and combines it with native poesy performed by Puerto Rican artists. The standard languages used in Puerto Rican hip-hop are Puerto Rican Spanish, Spanglish, and occasionally English. Lyricism can vary but in general they are either lyrically conscious or crude. Conscious lyricism in Puerto Rican Hip-Hop usually addresses social, cultural, or political issues through lyricism, as far as crudeness goes it resembles reggaeton in that aspect. The four main pillars of hip-hop—MCing, DJing, breakdancing, and graffiti—are present in Puerto Rico, especially apparent with graffiti. In the island there are institutions that promote breakdancing as a sport such as the Department of Sports and Recreation. Some songs integrate dancehall-like beats into their hip-hop to give it a familiar sound to their Puerto Rican audience.

=== Key regions to the development of Puerto Rican hip-hop ===
Vico C in an interview states that if he were to pinpoint an exact location on where Puerto Rican Hip-Hop was born, it would be the barrio he was raised in; Puerta de Tierra.

== See also ==
- Latin hip-hop
- Dominican hip-hop
- Merenrap
- Reggaeton
- Cuban hip-hop
- Brazilian hip-hop
- Mexican hip-hop
