= Gaudy Mercy =

Dominican rapper and journalist

- Born: Gaudy Mercedes Rodriguez; Santo Domingo, Dominican Republic
- Occupation: Musician

Gaudy Mercedes Rodriguez better known by her stage name Gaudy Mercy is a rapper and journalist from the Dominican Republic.

== Biography ==
Rodriguez was raised in the Santo Domingo neighbourhood of Los Mina. She began writing music lyrics when she was 9.

She has been a competitor and judge on Red Bull Batalla, an annual freestyling competition that takes place in Spanish speaking-countries. She has the record as the competitor to make it to the most national finals.

She has also appeared on the TV programs "El Gobierno Urbano" and "Freedom".

In 2014, she released her first LP, "La Dama de Hierro" (The Iron Lady).

In 2022, she starred in the reality TV series "El Heredero" (The Heir), where 20 rappers from 7 countries competed for a $50,000 prize. The show aired on the Disney Plus « Star + » platform.

In 2023, Rodriquez performed at Hip Hop al Parque in Bogota.
