= Alternative reggaeton =

Subgenre of reggaeton

- Stylistic origins: Reggaeton; Alternative rock; Latin American music
- Cultural origins: 2000s, Puerto Rico
- Typical instruments: Sampler; drums; bass guitar

Regional scenes
- Puerto Rico; United States

Other topics
- Latin hip hop

Alternative reggaeton is a subgenre of reggaeton that emerged from the reggaeton movement as a reaction to its repetitive and monotone dembow rhythm, and the predominant stereotypical gangsta content that became predictable. The result was a complex sound derived from world sounds, mainly rooted in other Latin American music based genres such as bomba, plena, salsa, bachata, merengue, cumbia, tango and other foreign influenced music such as alternative rock, rock en español and Latin alternative. Mixed with thoughtful (and sometimes crude) lyricism guided by an anti-colonialism discourse, Latin American sociopolitical content, and racial pride, it gave listeners a smooth blend of danceable rhythms and intellectual dialogue.

== History ==
The precursor is arguably one of the founding fathers of reggaeton: Vico C, whose albums relied heavily on hip-hop acoustics, keyboards, and reggae roots. Xplosión (1993), Aquel Que Había Muerto (1998) and Desahogo (2005) are good examples.

== Rise of a new sound ==
The starting point of alternative reggaeton per se is considered by many to be the album El Abayarde, the 2002 debut of Tego Calderón. The blend of Puerto Rican folk music, known as bomba y plena, two Afro-Puerto Rican genres and steady beats of hip hop and classical reggaeton served as a base for the new variant. The album became a major success, launching the underground status of Calderón to the pinnacle of the Spanish-speaking MC's.

== Breakthrough ==
The breakthrough album of what is considered alternative reggaeton came in 2005 with the self-titled debut album of Puerto Rican duo Calle 13. The song "Atrévete-te-te" from the album became a big success on the Billboard Hot Latin Songs chart, peaking at #15. This helped the genre gain more media exposure. The background of the Puerto Rican duo provided a fresh source for the subgenre. Producer and multi-instrumentalist Visitante was formally educated in music, and eventually formed part of a rock en español and Brazilian batucada band called Bayanga, which provided a diametrical point of view from the traditional caserío-inspired dancehall synthesizer sound from most albums. Lyricist Residente was highly educated, having earned a Masters of Fine Arts in the Savannah College of Art and Design, which contributed to his crafted lyricism and purposeful sarcasm. The main asset of the album was that it provided more than just danceable tracks, and it began to question the inner perception of Puerto Rican identity and the acceptance of foreign models as a pertinent solution to Latin American issues. This is evident in the Diddy mocking song "Pi-di-di-di". Some criticism has been raised of Residente of its close similarity to Eminem's songs and whole 'enfant terrible' ethos.

The sophomore and junior albums of the band have further expanded this realm creating a mature product that provides sexual discussions and ethical questioning. For this reason, the band has achieved critical success winning multiple accolades including five Grammys.

== Other exponents ==
Much like the alternative wing of hip hop (with artists such as Mos Def and Talib Kweli), both Tego Calderón and Calle 13 have found a solid fan base and success in the indie scene and mainstream scenarios. But other artists such as 7-9 (sometimes referred to as SieteNueve) and Intifada still remain relatively unknown. Although their content is deliberately Nationalistic and entirely in Spanish, much like the other alternative artists, they do not consider themselves reggaeton singers, but hip-hoppers. The only track to receive some airplay in major stations was 7-9's "Edúcate o Quédate Calla'o", a diss track against Daddy Yankee arguing that his support to John McCain in the 2008 U.S. Presidential Election was inappropriate and set a poor example for children. Another artist somewhat associated with the subgenre is producer Danny Fornaris, due to his protest track "Querido FBI", whom Calle 13 wrote in honor of Machetero leader Filiberto Ojeda Ríos after he was allegedly assassinated by the FBI. However, Fornaris' constant collaborations with mainstream reggaeton singers, such as Don Omar and Tito El Bambino, has devaluated him in the indie scene, contributing to a sellout stigma.
