= Miguelito (singer) =

Puerto Rican reggaeton singer

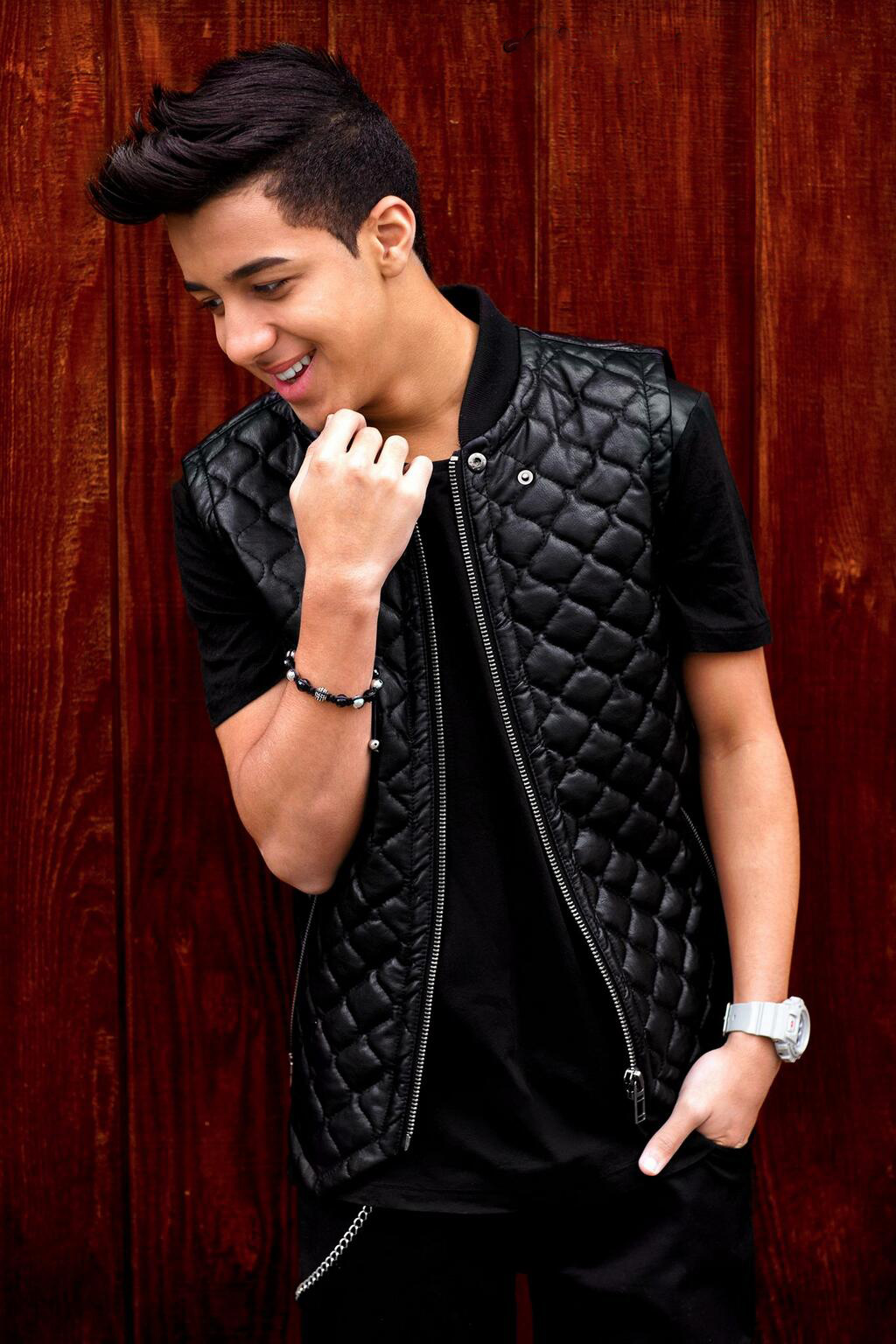
- Miguelito in 2013

Background information
- Also known as: El Papi
- Born: Miguel Ángel Valenzuela Morales; January 5, 1999 (age 27); San Juan, Puerto Rico
- Genres: Reggaeton
- Occupation: Singer-songwriter
- Instrument: Vocals
- Years active: 2006–present
- Labels: El Cartel (2006–2008); Blastmusic (2012–2015)
- Website: miguelitomto.com

Miguel Ángel Valenzuela Morales (born January 5, 1999), known as Miguelito, is a Puerto Rican reggaeton singer-songwriter. He has released seven albums and is the youngest Latin Grammy Awards winner certified by the Guinness World Records.

== Personal life ==
Miguelito is the youngest son of a Puerto Rican mother and a Dominican father. His family has insisted that he lives a normal life, keeping him enrolled in a private school in Dorado. He currently lives in Corona, California.

== Professional career ==
Starting his career in Puerto Rico under the direction of DJ Memo, he recorded his first single at the young age of six, entitled "Más Grande Que Tú". Such talent in a surprisingly small package caught the attention of local industry players, who quickly jumped on the opportunity. A video was recorded a short time later, followed by a full-length album by the same name, which featured the breakout hit "Montala". Más Grande Que Tú, distributed by Daddy Yankee's El Cartel Records, peaked in the top 20 in a number of Billboard's Latin categories. He has released seven albums. In 2009, he headlined "El coquí que quiso ser sapo", a children's musical written by Sunshine Logroño, his first serious incursion in acting. Also, that same year, he was called to be the main actor of the movie directed by David Impelluso, called Nadie Sabe Lo Que Tiene, that came out in 2010.

Miguelito is the youngest person to win a Latin Grammy Award. He won the award for Best Latin Children's Album on November 13, 2008. He was nine years old.

== Advocacy ==
Miguelito has been a strong advocate against social violence. On May 29, 2011, he organized and led a march in San Juan against violence that attracted thousands of attendees, then-Puerto Rico State Police Superintendent José Figueroa Sancha, former boxer Tito Trinidad and other local celebrities.

== Discography ==
Studio albums

- Más Grande Que Tú (2006)
- Más Grande Que Tú Limited Edition (2007)
- El Heredero (2007)
- Los Pitchers (2009)
- Todo El Mundo (2010)
- Tiempo De Navidad (2011)
- 081422 (2021)
- Traje Flow (2025)
