= Emboscada (album) =

Studio album by Vico C
- Released: July 2, 2002
- Studio: Funkytown Music
- Genre: Hip-hop
- Length: 42:18
- Label: EMI Latin
- Producer: Mr. Funky

Vico C chronology
Vivo (2001)	Emboscada (2002)	En Honor a la Verdad (2003)

Emboscada (English: Ambush) is the fifth studio album by Puerto Rican singer Vico C. It was released on July 2, 2002 by EMI Latin. Produced by Mr. Funky and described by the artist himself as his most complete album. It contains eleven tracks with themes of Christianity, redemption, social criticism and explicit lyrics (violence and sex) in the Latin urban genre. The album incorporates Christian rap with elements of alternative reggaeton and tropical house. Tracks include "El Súper Héroe", released as a bonus track on Vivo and a new version of the song "La Movida", originally from Con Poder (1996), which included a sample "He Renuciado de Ti" by Jose Jose.

Embocada received positive reviews. It won the Latin Grammy Award for Best Urban Music Album in 2002. It was nominated for Best Urban Album of the Year at Premio Lo Nuestro 2003 and for Latin Rap Album of the Year at the 2003 Latin Billboard Music Awards. Eventually, it peaked at number 36 US Top Latin Albums. The album was supported by the release of three official singles: "Los Perros, El Super Heroe" and the title track that was included on the sound track of the movie Out of Time and peaked at number 40 of US Hot Latin Songs.

== Track listing ==
No.	Title	Length
1.	"Intro"	1:55
2.	"Peligro"	2:54
3.	"¿Y Ahora Qué?"	4:10
4.	"Abusando"	3:58
5.	"La Niña Modelo"	6:09
6.	"Emboscada"	4:21
7.	"Los Perros"	3:58
8.	"La Movida"	3:23
9.	"Por el Lente del Cielo""	4:09
10.	"Crack Crack"	2:55
11.	"El Super Héroe"	4:21
Total length:		42:18

== Charts ==
Chart (2002)	Peak position
US Top Latin Albums (Billboard)	36
US Latin Pop Albums (Billboard)	16
US Top Latin Rap/Hip-Hop Albums (Billboard)	6
