= La Recta Final =

1989 studio album by Vico C and DJ Negro

Studio album by Vico C and DJ Negro
- Released: April 17, 1990
- Genre: Puerto Rican hip-hop

Vico C and DJ Negro chronology
La Recta Final (1990)	Misión La Cima (1990)

La Recta Final is a 1990 Latin hip-hop album released by Puerto Rican singer and rapper Vico C and by producer DJ Negro. The album is considered to be one of the most influential in the development of Puerto Rican hip-hop. The title track was one of Vico C's first ever songs and the one that ignited his path to fame. It sold over 60,000 copies.

== Track listing ==
=== Side one ===
1. "La Recta Final"
2. "Gusto, Sexo y Consecuencia"
3. "Viernes 13"
4. "El Amor Existe"

=== Side two ===
1. "La Recta Final" (Instrumental)
2. "Gusto, Sexo y Consecuencia" (Instrumental)
3. "Viernes 13" (Instrumental)
4. "El Amor Existe" (Instrumental)
