= Xplosión =

Studio album by Vico C
- Released: September 14, 1993
- Recorded: 1992–93; Prime Pro Studio
- Genre: Hip-hop
- Length: 40:29
- Labels: Prime Records; BMG
- Producers: Vico C; Barón Lopez

Vico C chronology
Traigo La Bomba (1992)	Xplosión (1993)	Dos Tiempos Bajo Un Mismo Tono (1994)

Xplosión is the second studio album by Puerto Rican rap recording artist Vico C released on September 14, 1993 by Prime Records and distributed by BMG. With lyrics raging from drugs trade, social conscience, violence and love along with a production between rap, R&B and reggae, Xplosion is considered one of Vico C's most important albums and is it credited to have an important influence of the early stages of the reggaeton movement. Some samples and contained on some tracks of the album, including "Love Will Never Do" by Janet Jackson for "Base y Fundamento", "Express Yourself" by N.W.A for "Saboréalo", "Take Your Time (Do It Right)" by The S.O.S. Band for "Baby Quiero Hacerlo" and "Get Up, Get into It, Get Involved" by James Brown for the single "María".

Xplosion received positive reviews by critics and fans alike. Billboard staff, stated that the album was a diverse set, containing an infectious mix of sociopolitical narratives and carnal love tales. However, it labeled some lyrics contains on some songs as an unfriendly to R&B and Latin radio. Just like his previous albums, Xplosion contains strong social lyrics. The track "Base y Fundamendo" talks about the differences between the upper social class and poor neighborhood in Puerto Rico, discrimination, colorism and racism. On the title track, is a social critique where he expresses his concern about the social status of the time, classism, the increase of drug addiction among youth and wars.

Following the release of the album, he was nominated for Rap Artist of the Year at the 6th Lo Nuestro Awards. Like his previous album, it contains a few Vico C's better known hits. "Maria" and "Saborealo" important airplay among the young audiences in Puerto Rico and were certified Gold and Platinum. Eventually, both tracks charted inside of US Tropical Airplay. Although, the album did not charted on any official chart.

== Track listing ==
No.	Title	Length
1.	"Base y Fundamento"	3:50
2.	"Así Es Que Va a Sonar"	4:01
3.	"Saboréalo"	4:16
4.	"Baby Quiero Hacerlo"	4:37
5.	"Él"	3:48
6.	"Cosa Nuestra"	3:52
7.	"Boom Boom"	3:25
8.	"María"	4:09
9.	"Pa' Mi Colección"	4:04
10.	"Xplosión"	4:24
Total length:		40:29

== Credits and personnel ==
The following credits are from Xplosion liner notes are:

- Arranged By, Programmed By, Recorded By – Baron Lopez
- Art Direction – Johnny Oquendo
- Bass – Stanley Kanashige
- Chorus – Lizzy Estrella*
- Executive Producer – Jorge Oquendo, Miguel Correa (3)
- Lyrics By, Music By – Vico C
- Mixed By – Orlando Collado
- Mixed By, Edited By – Elvis Cabrera
- Photography – Rafi Claudio
- Saxophone – Isaac Young
