= Vivo (Vico C album) =

Live album by Vico C
- Released: June 5, 2001
- Recorded: April 24–25, 1999
- Venue: Luis Muñoz Marín Amphitheater
- Genre: Hip-hop
- Length: 48:59
- Label: EMI Latin Music
- Producer: Luis Lozada

Vico C chronology
| Aquel Que Había Muerto (1998) | Vivo (2001) | Emboscada (2002) |

Vivo is a live album released by Puerto Rican singer Vico C released on June 5, 2001, by EMI Latin. It offers a collection of Vico C's greatest hits recorded entirely live in a concert held at the Luis Muñoz Marín Amphitheater in Hato Rey recorded in 1999. Also, Vivo presents a medley made up of some of Vico C's most popular songs: "El Filósofo", "La Calle", "En Coma", "Sin Pena" and "La Recta Final" and the unreleased song "El Super Heroe" along with a comic book focused on that character was included in the album.

Unlike much of the rougheredged rap, the artist used strong melodic lines and acoustic instruments as backdrop, borrowing freely from well-known grooves (Queen's "Another One Bites the Dust" on "El Filosofo") and songs ("I Like/Baby Quiero Hacerlo" performed with Lizzy Estrella, translates the chorus of the S.O.S. Band's R&B/pop/disco hit, "Take Your Time (Do It Right)"). Vivo received positive reviews by the critics. It won Best Rap/Hip-Hop Album at the 3rd Annual Latin Grammy Awards, and was nominated for Latin Rap Album of the Year at the 2002 Billboard Latin Music Awards. It debuted at number 43 US Top Latin Albums.

== Track listing ==
| No. | Title | Writer(s) | Length |
|---|---|---|---|
| 1. | "Introducción" | Luis Lozada | 1:21 |
| 2. | "Cosa nuestra de barrio / Base y Fundamento" | Luis Lozada | 7:41 |
| 3. | "El Filósofo / La calle / En coma / Sin pena / La Recta Final" | Luis Lozada | 10:20 |
| 4. | "Tony Presidio" | Luis Lozada | 3:49 |
| 5. | "She likes my reggae" | Luis Lozada | 4:52 |
| 6. | "Me acuerdo (con Lizzy Estrella)" | Luis Lozada | 8:01 |
| 7. | "I like it / Baby quiero hacerlo (con Lizzy Estrella)" | Luis Lozada | 8:46 |
| 8. | "El Súper Héroe [Bonus Track]" | Luis Lozada | 4:13 |
| Total length: | | | 48:59 |

== Charts ==
| Chart (2001) | Peak position |
|---|---|
| US Top Latin Albums (Billboard) | 43 |
