= Desahogo (Vico C album) =

Studio album by Vico C
- Released: March 1, 2005
- Recorded: 2004–05
- Genre: Hip-hop; alternative reggaeton; R&B
- Length: 47:35
- Label: EMI Latin

Vico C chronology
| The Files: The Greatest Hits (2004) | Desahogo (2005) | El Encuentro (2006) |

Desahogo is the seventh studio album released by Puerto Rican singer Vico C. It was released by EMI Latin on March 1, 2005 and is the follow-up of En Honor a la Verdad (2003). The album blends and fusion rap with traditional tropical music such as reggae, Cuban guaijra, vallenato and salsa along with R&B and reggaeton with raging lyrics from protest about political corruption, consumerism and social criticism to love, regrets, and romance. According the artist, it is his most complete album. It features guest appearances by Eddie Dee, Gilberto Santa Rosa, Cultura Profetica, Mala Rodriguez, Ivy Queen and D'Mingo. Initially, the album was set to be released on February 15, 2005. However, it was delayed due some recorded material were lost and later recovered.

Deshago was praised by the critics. While some praised the musical fusions others enjoyed the maturity and the structure on the lyrics. It receive two nominations including Best Urban Album at 6th Annual Latin Grammys and for Best Latin Rock/Alternative Album at the 47th Annual Grammy Awards. It was also nominated for Urban Album of the Year at Premios Lo Nuestro 2006 and Latin Rap/Hip-Hop Album of the Year at Billboard Latin Music Awards 2006. It was supported by the release of four singles: "Se Escaman", "Lo Grande Que Es Perdonar", "Compañera" and the title track.

== Track listing ==
1. "Intro - Voy Spoken Word"
2. "Desahogo"
3. "Se Escaman" (featuring Eddie Dee)
4. "Lo Grande Que Es Perdonar" (featuring Gilberto Santa Rosa)
5. "No Es Cuestión De Estar Pegao"
6. "Te Me Puedo Escapar" (featuring Cultura Profética)
7. "Tu Corazón Ya No Aguanta Pela"
8. "Vámonos Po' Encima" (featuring Mala Rodríguez and D'Mingo)
9. "Compañera"
10. "Ésta Es La Esquina"
11. "Mami"
12. "Échale" (featuring Ivy Queen)
13. "Outro - Se Acabó"

== Charts ==
| Chart (2005) | Peak position |
|---|---|
| Argentina Albums (CAPIF) | 14 |
| US Top Latin Albums (Billboard) | 8 |
| US Tropical Albums (Billboard) | 3 |
| US Heatseekers Albums (Billboard) | 21 |

== Sales and certifications ==
| Region | Certification | Certified units/sales |
|---|---|---|
| United States (RIAA) | Platinum (Latin) | 100,000^{^} |
^{^} Shipments figures based on certification alone.
