= Aquel Que Había Muerto =

Studio album by Vico C
- Released: December 1, 1998
- Genre: Hip-hop
- Label: EMI Latin
- Producers: Luis Lozada; Luis Raúl Marrero

Vico C chronology
Con poder (1996)	Aquel Que Había Muerto (1998)	Vivo (2001)

Music video
- "Aquel Que Había Muerto" on YouTube

Aquel Que Había Muerto (transl. That One Who Had Died) is the fourth studio album released by Puerto Rican rapper Vico C released on December 1, 1998. It was his first album to be released under the EMI Latin label. Recorded after a near-fatal overdose in 1997 and later rehabilitation in Orlando in an evangelic-Christian church, strong social conscience lyrics, it contains semi-autobiographical lyrics about his heroin addiction, his recovery, born again-Christianity and spiritual resurrection. With repeated references to Jesus Christ and disses" to his brethren in the gangsta-rap school, exposing the flipside of Puerto Rico's underground rap scene, in terms of the consequences of exposing young listeners to antisocial messages, it is his second Christian oriented album following Con Poder (1996). The album includes new versions of some of Vico C's greatest hits ("Tony Presidio", "Xplosion" and "La Recta Final").

With a production oriented on hardcore hip-hop, boom bap, Christian hip-hop, alternative reggaeton and co-produced by Luis Raúl Marrero "Funky", Aquel Que Había Muerto was considered Vico C's career resuscitation by critics and media. It was his first album to peak in the top 10 of US Top Latin Album and Latin Pop Album, it was certified gold for selling 50,000 copies on the first two days of being released. Following the release of the album, Vico C become the first rap act to have two albums charting simultaneously along with the greatest hits compilation Historia, Vol. 2. Also, it was named the 9th best-selling Latin album on US Billboard mid-year charts of 1999. The album was supported by the release of two official singles: "Quieren" and the title track.

Aquel Que Había Muerto was the first recipient of Rap Album of the Year at the 1999 Latin Billboard Music Awards. It was his first win, on his 10-year of career at the time and was the first-ever Latin urban act to win a Billboard award. It sold more than 250,000 copies including 84,000 in the United States. However, according to EMI, it sold over 215,000 between Puerto Rico and United States. As of 2003, it was Vico C best-selling album. To promote the album, Vico C embarked on a series of presentations in Latin America and United States, including two sold shows at the 7,000-seat Luis Muñoz Marín Amphitheater in San Juan on April 24 and 25, 1999. On the first show, he performed his previous hits and the second the new material. The concerts were recorded and later released on a live album titled Vivo (2001).

== Track listing ==
No.	Title	Writer(s)	Length
1.	"Aquel que había muerto (with Funky and 7th Poet)"	Luis Lozada; Luis Marrero; Roberto Candelario Jr.	4:53
2.	"Calla (with Funky)"	Luis Lozada; Luis Marrero	4:32
3.	"Quieren"	Luis Lozada	3:42
4.	"Donde comienzan las guerras"	Luis Lozada	4:09
5.	"Careta (with Funky)"	Luis Lozada; Luis Marrero	5:07
6.	"La Recta Final [Nueva versión]"	Luis Lozada	5:09
7.	"Dándote vida"	Luis Lozada	3:30
8.	"Explosión"	Luis Lozada	5:17
9.	"Tony Presidio"	Luis Lozada	6:09
10.	"Aquel que había muerto [Radio edit]"	Luis Lozada; Luis Marrero	3:59
Total length:			46:27

== Charts ==
Chart (1999)	Peak position
US Top Latin Albums (Billboard)	10
US Latin Pop Albums (Billboard)	10
US Heatseekers South Atlantic (Billboard)	8
