= En Honor a la Verdad =

Studio album by Vico C
- Released: November 18, 2003
- Recorded: 2003
- Studio: Da'Lab Studios (Miami, Florida); Da'Lab Studios (San Juan, Puerto Rico); Imagen Studios (Orlando, Florida)
- Genre: Hip-hop; reggaeton
- Length: 57:08
- Label: EMI Latin
- Producer: Noriega; Echo; Luny Tunes; D'Mingo; DJ Blass; Menace

Vico C chronology
Emboscada (2002)	En Honor a la Verdad (2003)	The Files: The Greatest Hits (2004)

En Honor a la Verdad is the sixth studio album by Puerto Rican singer Vico C. It was released on November 4, 2003, in the United States and Puerto Rico and November 18, 2003, by EMI Latin worldwide. The album incorporates aggressive sounds of hardcore rap and reggaeton and explores house, Afro-Cuban son riffs, salsa, along with the production of Noriega, Echo, Luny Tunes, D'Mingo, DJ Blass and Menace. Raging diverse topics from drug addiction, rehabilitation, social conscious, prison, tales and storytelling inspired on the streets of Puerto Rico, it contains 15 tracks, including one skit and three remixes. It featured guest appearances Eddie Dee, Tony Touch and Tego Calderon. The album also includes "5 de Septiembre" dedicated to his daughter.

En Honor a la Verdad received positive reviews. Recorded on a six weeks period and after being incarcerated for six months for violating the terms of a prior parole, the album is described by some critics as edgy, smart and introspective while others considered that it is best album. According to the artist, most of the songs were written in prison. It won Latin Grammy Award for Best Urban Music Album in 2004 and was nominated for Best Urban Performance at Premios Lo Nuestro 2004. Also, it was nominated for Latin Rap/Hip-Hop Album of the Year at 2004 Billboard Latin Music Awards. The album was supported by the release of two official singles: "Para Mi Barrio" and "El Bueno, El Malo y El Feo", later included on the compilation album Guatauba-The Kings of New York, Vol. 2.

En Honor a la Verdad was set to be released on November 18, 2003. However, the date was pushed up to November 4 due the positive reaction and early success of the first two singles in Puerto Rico. It debuted at number five at US Top Latin Albums and number four on US Latin Pop Albums, his highest debut ever at the time. It was certified platinum (Latin field) by the RIAA for shipping 100,000 copies in the United States. The album was re-released, including a 25-minute documentary chronicling the rapper's release from prison and the making of the album.

== Track listing ==
No.	Title	Length
1.	"Intro"	1:04
2.	"En Honor a la Verdad"	3:42
3.	"Capicu"	4:02
4.	"5 De Septiembre" (Acoustic Version)"	3:02
5.	"Flowowow"	3:47
6.	"Para Mi Barrio (feat. Tony Touch and D'Mingo)"	5:49
7.	"En la Barberia (Skit)"	2:02
8.	"Superman"	3:42
9.	"Masacote"	3:30
10.	"El Bueno, El Malo y El Feo (feat. Eddie Dee and Tego Calderón)"	4:17
11.	"Yerba Mala"	3:20
12.	"Mi Forma de Tiradera"	5:28
13.	"5 De Septiembre" [Reggaeton Mix]"	2:57
14.	"Para Mi Barrio" [Reggaeton Mix] (feat. Tony Touch and D'Mingo)"	5:57
15.	"El Bueno, El Malo y El Feo" [Reggaeton Mix]"	4:29
Total length:		57:08

== Charts ==
Chart (2003)	Peak position
US Top Latin Albums (Billboard)	5
US Latin Pop Albums (Billboard)	4
US Top Heatseekers (Billboard)	6

== Sales and certifications ==
Region	Certification	Certified units/sales
United States (RIAA)	Platinum (Latin)	100,000^{^}
^{^} Shipments figures based on certification alone.
