= Vico C =

American rapper (born 1971)

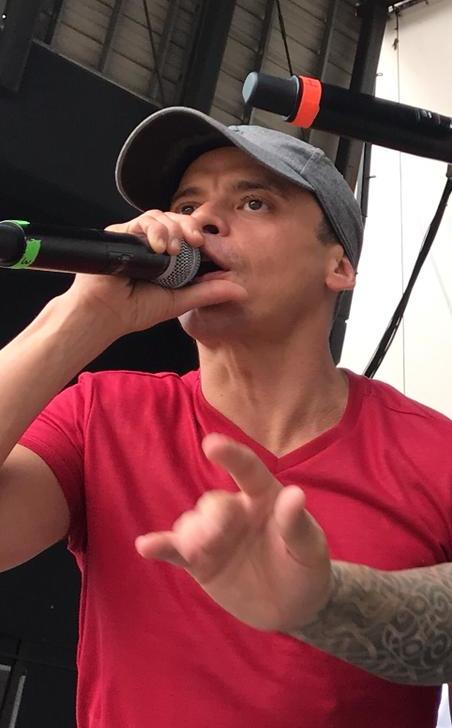
- Vico C in 2018
- Born: Luis Armando Lozada Cruz; September 8, 1971 (age 54); Brooklyn, New York, U.S.
- Occupations: Rapper; singer; record producer
- Years active: 1984–present
- Spouse: Sonia Torres (m. 1996)
- Children: 7
- Musical career
- Genres: Puerto Rican hip-hop; reggaeton
- Instrument: Vocals
- Labels: Capitol Latin; Nain

Luis Armando Lozada Cruz (born September 8, 1971), known by his stage name Vico C, is an American rapper. Regarded as a major influence in the development of reggaeton, Vico C has played an influential role in the development of Latin American hip-hop and urban music.

== Early life and influence ==
He was born in New York and raised in Puerto Rico. Nicknamed El Filósofo del Rap, ("The Philosopher of Rap"), Luis Armando Lozada Cruz adopted the professional name Vico C. Vico C describes reggaeton as "essentially hip-hop but with a flavor more compatible to the Caribbean".

As one of the founders of hip-hop in Spanish, Vico C was able to show that it was possible for one to be able to rap entirely and compellingly in Spanish using just occasional English phrases or slang terms. He can be seen in the rap movement as far back as its "underground" days ghostwriting and producing music for other young performers in the Puerto Rican rap scene.

Vico C grew up in the Puerta de Tierra barrio in San Juan. He got enrolled in acting classes by the age of nine and began his professional rapping career in 1985. At first, he used to go to bodegas (grocery stores) or pharmacies, buy home recording tapes, record himself singing his songs and then sell the tapes to friends or family. Vico C was discovered by DJ Negro in 1985 whom immediately saw the great potential of hip-hop in Spanish and chose to record Vico's earliest demos. Upon the positive reaction from the barrio, DJ Negro brought Vico to the most successful hip-hop promoter in Puerto Rico, Jorge Oquendo (also known as 'El Sexy Boy'). Jorge Oquendo formed the record label 'Prime Records' with Vico C as the lead artist of the label. Prime Records eventually received a distribution deal via Sony BMG Latin. Prime Records is one of the most successful and influential record labels in the history of Spanish rap and reggaeton known for being the home to legendary acts such as DJ Negro, Vico C, El General, Lisa M, Falo, Brewley MC and more.

In May 2019, he suffered seizures resulting from an allergic reaction to medication and was hospitalized but recovered.

== Career ==
In 1988, Puerto Rican rap in Puerto Rico was not at a popular high, and Vico C was the first one to rap in Spanish in Puerto Rico, considered the Godfather of Puerto Rican hip-hop and the pioneer of this genre, there were others who followed in his footsteps, rapping in the ghettos. Brewley MC, Piro JM, Jimmy MC, Bimbo, (Lisa M, Jelly Dee Franceska, came afterward) Ruben DJ was the first rapper to sound on the radio by releasing "La Escuela" after Vico C fame was already known on the whole island for his underground lyrics. Brewley MC also recorded "El Sida Rap with Green Records". Vico C entered the charts with his song "La Recta Final" which he personally designed the album cover for, with his artistic talents. Vico C was signed to Prime Records and started touring to venues in New York, Chicago, Miami, Mexico, Venezuela, El Salvador, Panama, the Dominican Republic.

Vico C, in 1992 released his singles "Saborealo" and "María" which became hits. In 1994, he established his own record company VC Records, released albums for Taino and Lissy Estrella. Also helping promote such Spanish rap singers as Francheska, and Lisa M who were originally his back up dancers. In 1990, Vico C was involved in a near-fatal motorcycle accident. His injuries led to his abuse of heroin, cocaine, and alcohol.

Soon after, he became an evangelical Christian and went into a voluntary semi-retirement. In 1998, he resurfaced, with the "rambunctious", Christian rap CD Aquel Que Había Muerto. The new CD went gold and in 1999, he returned to the touring scene with his concert Antes y después. Soon after, he released a sequel to Aquel Que Había Muerto. With that, he earned the Latino Rap of the year award by Billboard.

In 2003, Vico C released an album titled En Honor a la Verdad. While it was not a major hit it still sold well and one of the album's singles "El Bueno, El Malo y El Feo". The song gets its name by referring to Eddie Dee, himself and Tego Calderón respectively, and was the biggest hit of the album.

in 2005 he released another album, Desahogo.

Vico C also known as "el filósofo del rap" has worked alongside artists including Big Boy, Eddie Dee, Héctor & Tito, Tego Calderón en los "12 discipulos". He has also worked with producers Baby Ranks, Tony Touch and Luny Tunes.

He has sung alongside salsa singer Gilberto Santa Rosa and cumbia group Kumbia Kings on their album titled Duetos.

Vico C tries to maintain a Christian theme throughout his music. His brother Jay Lozada is a salsa musician.

In 2020, music by Vico C was part of the annual Banco Popular Christmas songs compilation album.

In 2023, he signed a deal with Nain Music, a subsidiary of the Rimas Entertainment record label, for an unreleased album by Vico C to be released in May 2023. In March, Vico C presents his new single "Pregúntale a Tu Papá por Mí". Vico C also won for the best comeback in Premios Tu Musica Urbano.

== Movie ==
Vico C: La vida del filósofo is a biographical film about the life of Vico C. The movie was inspired by the director Eduardo "Transfor" Ortiz's idea, which he conceived while listening to Vico C's song "La inglesa" on the radio. The film portrays Vico C's journey, including his rise to international fame, his Grammy Latino awards, struggles with drug addiction, imprisonment, and the death of his mother. Vico C's son, Luis Armando "Loupz" Lozada Jr., portrays him in the movie, while Vico C himself contributed to the screenplay and provided coaching to the actors.

The film Vico C, la vida del filósofo was available for streaming on the Netflix platform in Latin America. The biographical movie, which was released in theaters in Puerto Rico, the Dominican Republic, and the United States in 2017, gained popularity and was one of the most-watched films on the streaming platform "Pantaya".

== Legacy ==
Vico is recognized for having lyrics that were thoughtful, insightful, socially conscious as well as catchy and danceable songs for all kind of audiences. The musical blueprint implemented by Vico C is the precursor of the genre now known as reggaeton. Many hip-hop/reggaeton journalists and experts consider Vico C as one of the pioneers of the reggaeton genre and the Latin rap genre.

== Discography ==
- La Recta Final (1989)
- Misión La Cima (1990)
- Hispanic Soul (1991)
- Xplosión (1993)
- Con poder (1996)
- Aquel Que Había Muerto (1998)
- Emboscada (2002)
- En Honor a la Verdad (2003)
- Desahogo (2005)
- Babilla (2009)
- Pánico (2023)

== Accolades ==
=== American Society of Composers, Authors and Publishers Awards ===
Year	Nominee / work	Award	Result	Ref.
2017	Vico C	Vanguard Award	Won	

=== Billboard Latin Music Awards ===
Year	Nominee/work	Award	Result	Ref.
1999	Aquel Que Había Muerto	Latin Rap Album of the Year	Won	
2002	Vivo	Latin Rap Album of the Year	Nominated	
2003	Emboscada	Latin Rap Album of the Year	Nominated	
2004	En Honor a la Verdad	Latin Rap/Hip-Hop Album of the Year	Nominated	
2005	"Los 12 Discípulos"; Shared with Eddie Dee, Gallego, Tego Calderón, Daddy Yankee, Julio Voltio, Ivy Queen, Zion & Lennox, Johnny Prez, Nicky Jam and Wiso G	Tropical Airplay Track of the Year, New Artist	Nominated	
2006	Desahogo	Latin Rap/Hip-Hop Album of the Year	Nominated	

=== Grammy Awards ===
Year	Nominee / work	Award	Result	Ref.
2006	Desahogo	Best Latin Rock, Urban or Alternative Album	Nominated	

=== Latin Grammy Awards ===
Year	Nominee / work	Award	Result	Ref.
2002	Vivo	Best Urban Music Album	Won	
2003	Emboscada	Best Urban Music Album	Nominated	
2004	En Honor a la Verdad	Best Urban Music Album	Won	
2005	Desahogo	Best Urban Music Album	Nominated	
2010	Babilla	Best Urban Music Album	Nominated	
2010	"Sentimiento"	Best Urban Song	Nominated	
2017	"Papá"	Best Urban Song	Nominated	
2023	"Pregúntale a Tu Papá Por Mi"	Best Rap/Hip Hop Song	Pending	

=== Latin Songwriters Hall of Fame ===
Year	Nominee / work	Award	Result	Ref.
2016	Vico C	Latin Songwriters Hall of Fame – Performer	Nominated	
2018	Vico C	Latin Songwriters Hall of Fame – Performer	Pending	

=== Lo Nuestro Awards ===
Year	Nominee / work	Award	Result	Ref.
2003	Emboscada	Urban Album of the Year	Nominated	
2006	Desahogo	Urban Album of the Year	Nominated	
2006	"Desahogo"	Video of the Year	Nominated	

== See also ==
- List of Puerto Rican songwriters
- List of Puerto Ricans
- Music of Puerto Rico
