= Babo (rapper) =

Mexican rapper, singer and composer (born 1968)

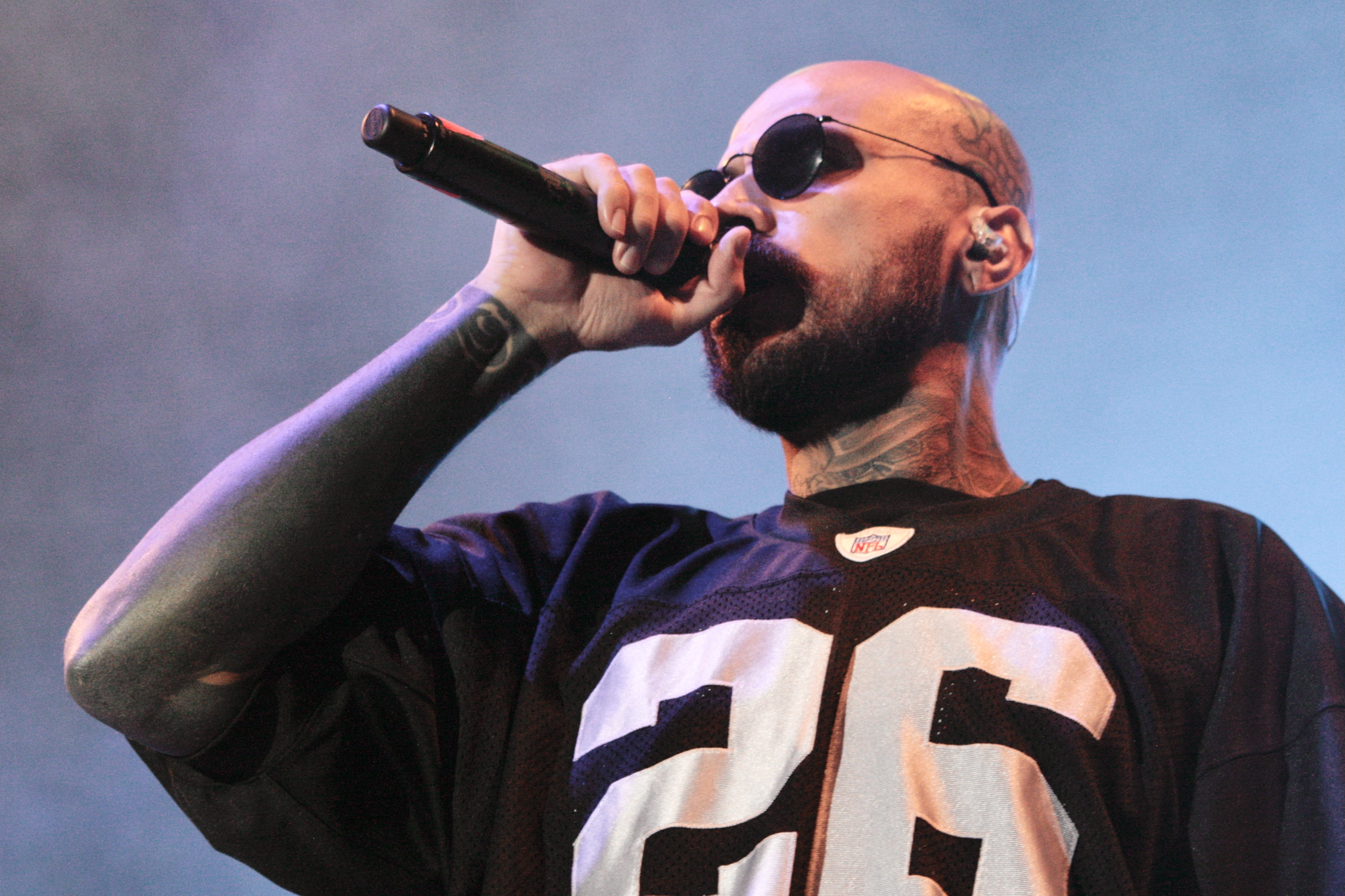
- Babo in 2013

Background information
- Also known as: MC Babo
- Born: Eduardo Dávalos de Luna; November 16, 1968 (age 58); Santa Catarina, Nuevo León, Mexico
- Genres: Hip hop, gangsta rap, rapcore, rap metal
- Occupation: Rapper • songwriter • record producer
- Years active: 1994-present
- Labels: Sony BMG; Babilonia Music
- Member of: Cartel de Santa
- Website: carteldesanta.com

Eduardo Dávalos de Luna (November 16, 1968), known professionally as Babo, is a Mexican rapper, songwriter, and record producer. He is the founder and lead rapper of Mexican hip hop group Cartel de Santa.

== Career ==
Since he was a child, Babo wanted to spend all day out on the streets. On one occasion, a friend nicknamed "El Cancersillos" told him he knew some people who played music just "for the party." Later, he met Rowán Rabia and Enrique López Márquez, known as "El Quick Ass," who would go on to become members of the group Cártel de Santa. When they started doing live shows at La Deportiva del Estado, Babo realized he needed a rapper, and that’s when Dharius, also known as "Tirano-D" or "D-H-A," joined the group. Their first album came out in 2003 under the title Cártel de Santa. In addition to the track "Perros," songs like "Todas mueren por mí" and "La pelotona" also gained popularity. This album was followed by Vol. II, which included singles such as "Blah, blah, blah," "La llamada," among others. In 2014, Babo released his sixth album titled Golpe avisa, featuring standout tracks like "Doctor Marihuana," "Los mensajes del WhatsApp," "Si te vienen a contar," and "Suena mamalona," achieving success mainly in Mexico. In 2016, the group released their seventh album, Viejo Marihuano, with hits such as "Leve," "Culón, culito," and "Soy quien soy," among others. The album entered the Billboard charts, reaching number 2 in the Latin Albums category.

== Discography ==
=== Studio albums ===
List of studio albums, with selected details, chart positions and certifications
| Title | Details | Peak chart positions | | | Certifications |
| Title | Details | MEX | US Latin | US Rap | Certifications |
|---|---|---|---|---|---|
| Cartel de Santa | Released: 2003; Label: Sony BMG | — | — | — | |
| Vol. II | Released: December 7, 2004; Label: Sony BMG, Babilonia | — | — | — | |
| Volumen ProIIIbido | Released: March 20, 2006; Label: Sony BMG, Babilonia | — | — | — | |
| Vol. IV | Released: February 20, 2008; Label: Sony BMG, Babilonia | 22 | — | — | |
| Sincopa | Released: May 25, 2010; Label: Sony BMG, Babilonia | 9 | 67 | — | AMPROFON: Gold |
| Golpe Avisa | Released: August 5, 2014; Label: Babilonia, Sony Music | 5 | 4 | 16 | AMPROFON: 2× Platinum+Gold |
| Viejo Marihuano | Released: November 18, 2016; Label: Babilonia, Sony Music | 12 | 2 | 18 | AMPROFON: Platinum |

=== Compilation albums ===
- Cartel de Santa, Casa Babilonia presentan: Los Mixtapes (2006)
- Cartel de Santa, Greatest Hits (2007)
- Casa Babilonia Records: Compilado (2008)
- Casa Rifa: Demos (2009)
- Sincopa 5.1 (2011)

=== Soundtrack albums ===
- Los Jefes (Banda Sonora de la Película) (2015)

=== Live albums ===
- Me Atizo Macizo Tour (En Vivo) (2012)

=== Singles ===
- "Pollo y Conejo" (2018)
- "Burbujas de Cristal" (2019) (with Millonario)
- "Vaya Vaya" (2020)
- "TUY" (2021) (with Alemán, Millonario, and Adán Cruz)
- "Piensa en Mi" (2023)
- "Shorty Party" (2023) (with La Kelly)
- "Pablito y el Pelon" (2023) (with Pablito Calavera)

== Legal issues ==
In April 2007, Babo was arrested by police officers after firing a bullet that accidentally ricocheted and struck his friend Ulises, causing his death. According to authorities in the metropolitan municipality of Santa Catarina, Babo had allegedly attempted to kill the group’s driver, Juan Miguel Chávez Pimentel, with whom he had “long-standing disputes.” Another version of the incident claims that it was actually Juan Miguel Chávez Pimentel who provoked Babo by firing at the ground after threatening to kill him, but the bullet bounced off the ground and fatally wounded Ulises. The Public Security Secretariat (SSP) reported that the crime occurred around 8:40 PM on the streets of Mar Báltico and Mar Rojo, in the Aurora neighborhood of Santa Catarina. Babo is said to have mistakenly shot Ulises with a .38 Super caliber weapon, which also injured Chávez Pimentel in the leg. He was formally charged by a judge with involuntary manslaughter and unlawful use of a firearm. In January 2008, nine months after the incident, he was released after posting bail of 130,000 Mexican pesos.
