= Uno, Dos: Bandera =

Studio album by Control Machete
- Released: April 27, 2004
- Genre: Latin hip hop
- Length: 1:05:02
- Label: Universal
- Producer: Jason Roberts; Pato Machete; Sacha Triujeque; Toy Selectah

Control Machete chronology
Artillería Pesada, Presenta... (1999)	Uno, Dos: Bandera (2004)

Professional ratings
Review scores
Source	Rating
AllMusic	4/5 stars
laut.de	3/5 stars
RapReviews	7/10

Uno, Dos: Bandera is the third and final studio album by Mexican hip hop group Control Machete. It was released on April 27, 2004 via Universal Music Latino. Production was handled by members Pato Machete and Toy Selectah, as well as Jason Roberts and Sacha Triujeque. It features guest appearance from Randy "El Gringo Loco" Ebright. At the 5th Annual Latin Grammy Awards, the album was nominated for a Latin Grammy Award for Best Urban Music Album, but lost to Vico C's En Honor a la Verdad.

== Background ==
Uno, Dos: Bandera was released following a four year gap for Control Machete. After Fermín IV left the group no original work was released by Control until this more collaborative album released by Toy Selectah and Pato Machete.

== Track listing ==
No.	Title	Length
1.	"Bandera"	4:31
2.	"Bien, Bien"	3:18
3.	"Como Ves"	3:45
4.	"Paciencia"	3:01
5.	"Toda la Casa"	4:08
6.	"Nostalgia"	3:55
7.	"En el Camino"	6:38
8.	"El Apostador"	5:08
9.	"De"	3:04
10.	"Ahora" (featuring Randy "El Gringo Loco" Ebright)	3:54
11.	"Nociones (En Alta)"	4:37
12.	"Verbos"	4:34
13.	"El Genio del Dub"	14:29
Total length:		1:05:02
