= Mucho Barato =

Mucho Barato...

Studio album by Control Machete
- Released: February 14, 1996
- Studios: Estudios AGM (Nuevo León, Mexico); Sound Station Studios (Monterrey, N.L.); The Lab (Silverlake, CA)
- Genre: Mexican hip-hop
- Length: 54:19
- Labels: Mercury Records; PolyGram Discos
- Producers: Jason Roberts; Toy Selectah

Control Machete chronology
Mucho Barato... (1996)	Artillería Pesada Presenta (1999)

Singles from Mucho Barato
- 1. "¿Comprendes, Mendes?" Released: 1996; 2. "Andamos Armados" Released: 1997; 3. "Así Son Mis Días" Released: 1997

Professional ratings
Review scores
Source	Rating
AllMusic	4/5 stars

Mucho Barato... is the debut studio album by Mexican hip-hop group Control Machete. It was released on February 14, 1996 via Mercury Records/PolyGram Discos. Recording sessions took place at Estudios AGM and Sound Station Studios in Nuevo León and at The Lab in Silverlake. Production was handled by member Toy Selectah and Jason Roberts.

Music video for the lead single "¿Comprendes Mendes?" was nominated for a International Viewer's Choice: MTV Latin America at the 1997 MTV Video Music Awards, but lost to Café Tacuba's "Chilanga Banda".

The album was ranked 93th on the Los 600 de Latinoamérica list.

== Track listing ==
No.	Title	Writer(s)	Producer(s)	Length
1.	"Control Machete"	Antonio Hernández; Raúl Chapa; Fermín Caballero	Toy Selectah	3:11
2.	"¿Comprendes Mendes?"	Jason Roberts; Chapa; Caballero	Jason Roberts	3:35
3.	"Las Fabulosas I"	Hernández	Toy Selectah	1:13
4.	"Andamos Armados"	Hernández; Chapa; Caballero	Jason Roberts	3:57
5.	"Humanos Mexicanos"	Hernández; Chapa; Caballero	Toy Selectah	3:07
6.	"Cheve"	Hernández; Caballero; David Ruíz	Toy Selectah	3:44
7.	"Madrugada Encore"	Hernández; Caballero	Toy Selectah	0:47
8.	"Así Son Mis Días"	Hernández; Chapa; Caballero	Jason Roberts	3:35
9.	"¿Te Aprovechas Del Limite?"	Hernández	Toy Selectah	3:11
10.	"Justo'n"	Hernández; Chapa; Caballero	Jason Roberts	5:13
11.	"La Cope De Dama"	Hernández	Toy Selectah	0:36
12.	"La Lupita"	Hernández; Caballero	Toy Selectah	3:38
13.	"Grin-Gosano"	Roberts; Chapa; Caballero; Hernández	Jason Roberts	2:16
14.	"Unete Pueblo"	Hernández; Chapa; Caballero	Toy Selectah	3:48
15.	"Las Fabulosas II"	Hernández	Toy Selectah	1:02
16.	"El Son Divino"	Hernández; Chapa; Caballero	Jason Roberts	3:16
17.	"Marioneta"	Hernández; Chapa; Caballero	Toy Selectah	4:17
18.	"Mexican Curios" (Bonus Track)	Hernández; Chapa; Caballero; Erick Santos	Jason Roberts	3:52
Total length:				54:19

== Certifications ==
Region	Certification	Certified units/sales
United States (RIAA)	Platinum (Latin)	100,000^{^}
^{^} Shipments figures based on certification alone.
