= List of Spotify streaming records =

The following lists contain the most streamed songs and albums as well as chart records on the audio streaming platform Spotify.

== Most-streamed songs ==
On this list, songs are ranked by cumulative streams since their release. This section features the top 100 most streamed songs.

Rank	Song	Artist(s)	Streams (billions)	Release date	Ref.
1	"Blinding Lights"	The Weeknd	5.690	29 November 2019	
2	"Shape Of You"	Ed Sheeran	5.197	6 January 2017	
3	"Sweater Weather"	The Neighbourhood	5.046	3 December 2012	
4	"Starboy"	The Weeknd and Daft Punk	4.878	21 September 2016	
5	"As It Was"	Harry Styles	4.723	1 April 2022	
6	"One Dance"	Drake, Wizkid, and Kyla	4.576	5 April 2016	
7	"Sunflower"	Post Malone and Swae Lee	4.566	18 October 2018	
8	"Someone You Loved"	Lewis Capaldi	4.504	8 November 2018	
9	"Perfect"	Ed Sheeran	4.193	3 March 2017	
10	"Die With A Smile"	Lady Gaga and Bruno Mars	4.159	16 August 2024	
11	"Stay"	The Kid Laroi and Justin Bieber	4.143	27 July 2021	
12	"I Wanna Be Yours"	Arctic Monkeys	4.124	9 September 2013	
13	"Birds of a Feather"	Billie Eilish	4.118	17 May 2024	
14	"Yellow"	Coldplay	4.101	26 June 2000	
15	"The Night We Met"	Lord Huron	4.049	7 April 2015	
16	"Riptide"	Vance Joy	4.021	21 May 2013	
17	"Believer"	Imagine Dragons	4.021	1 February 2017	
18	"Heat Waves"	Glass Animals	4.003	29 June 2020	
19	"Closer"	The Chainsmokers and Halsey	3.967	29 July 2016	
20	"Lovely"	Billie Eilish and Khalid	3.943	19 April 2018	
21	"Every Breath You Take"	The Police	3.890	20 May 1983	
22	"Iris"	The Goo Goo Dolls	3.880	1 April 1998	
23	"Something Just Like This"	The Chainsmokers and Coldplay	3.846	22 February 2017	
24	"Another Love"	Tom Odell	3.780	15 October 2012	
25	"Say You Won't Let Go"	James Arthur	3.748	9 September 2016	
26	"Counting Stars"	OneRepublic	3.738	14 June 2013	
27	"Take Me To Church"	Hozier	3.660	13 September 2013	
28	"Photograph"	Ed Sheeran	3.621	20 June 2014	
29	"Viva La Vida"	Coldplay	3.620	25 May 2008	
30	"Locked Out Of Heaven"	Bruno Mars	3.618	1 October 2012	
31	"Mr. Brightside"	The Killers	3.614	29 September 2003	
32	"Can't Hold Us"	Macklemore & Ryan Lewis and Ray Dalton	3.597	16 August 2011	
33	"Just the Way You Are"	Bruno Mars	3.575	20 July 2010	
34	"Dance Monkey"	Tones And I	3.548	10 May 2019	
35	"Cruel Summer"	Taylor Swift	3.541	23 August 2019	
36	"Die For You"	The Weeknd	3.513	25 November 2016	
37	"Rockstar"	Post Malone and 21 Savage	3.489	15 September 2017	
38	"That's What I Like"	Bruno Mars	3.483	30 January 2017	
39	"Señorita"	Shawn Mendes and Camila Cabello	3.477	21 June 2019	
40	"In The End"	Linkin Park	3.476	24 October 2000	
41	"Watermelon Sugar"	Harry Styles	3.445	16 November 2019	
42	"Love Yourself"	Justin Bieber	3.432	9 November 2015	
43	"Billie Jean"	Michael Jackson	3.386	29 November 1982	
44	"When I Was Your Man"	Bruno Mars	3.372	7 December 2012	
45	"Don't Start Now"	Dua Lipa	3.369	31 October 2019	
46	"Circles"	Post Malone	3.345	30 August 2019	
47	"Bohemian Rhapsody"	Queen	3.339	31 October 1975	
48	"Let Me Love You"	DJ Snake and Justin Bieber	3.308	5 August 2016	
49	"Without Me"	Eminem	3.306	13 May 2002	
50	"Wake Me Up"	Avicii and Aloe Blacc	3.294	17 June 2013	
51	"Thinking Out Loud"	Ed Sheeran	3.277	20 June 2014	
52	"Goosebumps"	Travis Scott and Kendrick Lamar	3.276	2 September 2016	
53	"Treat You Better"	Shawn Mendes	3.269	3 June 2016	
54	"Creep"	Radiohead	3.265	21 September 1992	
55	"Espresso"	Sabrina Carpenter	3.261	11 April 2024	
56	"All The Stars"	Kendrick Lamar and SZA	3.261	4 January 2018	
57	"Beautiful Things"	Benson Boone	3.258	19 January 2024	
58	"All of Me"	John Legend	3.251	12 August 2013	
59	"Lucid Dreams"	Juice Wrld	3.244	4 May 2018	
60	"Stressed Out"	Twenty One Pilots	3.240	28 April 2015	
61	"God's Plan"	Drake	3.237	19 January 2018	
62	"Do I Wanna Know?"	Arctic Monkeys	3.229	19 June 2013	
63	"The Hills"	The Weeknd	3.224	27 May 2015	
64	"Shallow"	Lady Gaga and Bradley Cooper	3.219	27 September 2018	
65	"Wonderwall"	Oasis	3.206	30 October 1995	
66	"See You Again"	Tyler, the Creator and Kali Uchis	3.203	21 July 2017	
67	"Demons"	Imagine Dragons	3.203	4 September 2012	
68	"Smells Like Teen Spirit"	Nirvana	3.185	10 September 1991	
69	"Thunder"	Imagine Dragons	3.161	27 April 2017	
70	"Unforgettable"	French Montana and Swae Lee	3.152	7 April 2017	
71	"Seven"	Jung Kook and Latto	3.150	14 July 2023	
72	"Sorry"	Justin Bieber	3.146	22 October 2015	
73	"505"	Arctic Monkeys	3.144	27 April 2007	
74	"No Role Modelz"	J. Cole	3.106	9 December 2014	
75	"End of Beginning"	Djo	3.085	16 September 2022	
76	"Lose Yourself"	Eminem	3.081	28 October 2002	
77	"The Scientist"	Coldplay	3.076	26 May 2002	
78	"There's Nothing Holdin' Me Back"	Shawn Mendes	3.074	20 April 2017	
79	"Don't Stop Believin'"	Journey	3.072	19 October 1981	
80	"Dreams"	Fleetwood Mac	3.037	4 February 1977	
81	"Flowers"	Miley Cyrus	3.036	13 January 2023	
82	"Humble"	Kendrick Lamar	3.026	30 March 2017	
83	"Drivers License"	Olivia Rodrigo	3.018	8 January 2021	
84	"Take On Me"	A-ha	3.008	19 October 1984	
85	"Bad Guy"	Billie Eilish	3.007	29 March 2019	
86	"Numb"	Linkin Park	3.003	25 March 2003	
87	"7 Rings"	Ariana Grande	2.976	18 January 2019	
88	"One Of The Girls"	The Weeknd, Jennie, and Lily-Rose Depp	2.973	23 June 2023	
89	"Sweet Child O' Mine"	Guns N' Roses	2.972	21 July 1987	
90	"Kill Bill"	SZA	2.948	9 December 2022	
91	"Let Her Go"	Passenger	2.945	24 July 2012	
92	"Save Your Tears"	The Weeknd	2.909	20 March 2020	
93	"Payphone"	Maroon 5 and Wiz Khalifa	2.883	6 April 2012	
94	"Cold Heart"	Elton John, Dua Lipa and Pnau	2.861	13 August 2021	
95	"Lean On"	Major Lazer, DJ Snake, and MØ	2.856	2 March 2015	
96	"Uptown Funk"	Mark Ronson and Bruno Mars	2.853	10 November 2014	
97	"Danza Kuduro"	Don Omar and Lucenzo	2.849	15 August 2010	
98	"One Kiss"	Calvin Harris and Dua Lipa	2.836	6 April 2018	
99	"Africa"	Toto	2.835	29 March 1982	
100	"Don't Stop Me Now"	Queen	2.829	26 January 1979	
As of 20 November 2026

=== Notes ===
- The track "Clean Baby Sleep White Noise (Loopable)" credited to the artist Dream Supplier has over 3.066 billion streams on the platform as of October 2026. The track is purely white noise, not to be confused with the genre noise music, and appears on multiple Dream Supplier releases.

== Artists with the highest number of songs currently in the top 100 ==
Rank	Artist	Top 100			Top 10		3 billion+ streams		4 billion+ streams		5 billion+ streams	
Rank	Artist	Total songs	Lead	Feat.	Lead	Feat.	Lead	Feat.	Lead	Feat.	Lead	Feat.
1	The Weeknd	6	6		2		4		2		1	
1	Bruno Mars	6	6		1		5		1			
2	Ed Sheeran	4	4		2		4		2		1	
2	Coldplay	4	4				4		1			
2	Justin Bieber	4	3	1			3	1	1	1		
3	Post Malone	3	3		1		3		1			
3	Arctic Monkeys	3	3				3		1			
3	Billie Eilish	3	3				3		1			
3	Imagine Dragons	3	3				3		1			
3	Shawn Mendes	3	3				3					
3	Dua Lipa	3	3				1					
3	Kendrick Lamar	3	2	1			2	1				
As of 20 November 2026

== Historical most-streamed songs ==
Current record of longest time held

Billions of streams at the time song became most-streamed.

No.	Song	Artist(s)	Streams (billions)	Release date	Date achieved	Days held	Ref.	Notes
9	"Blinding Lights"	The Weeknd	3.332	29 November 2019	1 January 2023	1,419		
8	"Shape of You"	Ed Sheeran	1.318	6 January 2017	21 September 2017	1,928		
7	"One Dance"	Drake featuring Wizkid and Kyla	0.882	5 April 2016	18 October 2016	338		
6	"Lean On"	Major Lazer featuring MØ and DJ Snake	0.526	2 March 2015	11 November 2015	342		
5	"Thinking out Loud"	Ed Sheeran	0.355	21 June 2014	22 May 2015	173		
4	"Wake Me Up"	Avicii	0.188	17 June 2013	1 January 2014	506		(Note: The exact date and number of streams that "Wake Me Up" had when it surpassed "Radioactive" is unknown. Best estimates were made based on its 3.8 million weekly streams and the 17 million stream difference between the two songs when it reached 200 million streams.)
3	"Radioactive"	Imagine Dragons	—	14 February 2012	30 August 2012	109		(Note: The exact date and number of streams that "Radioactive" had when it became Spotify's most streamed song is unknown.)
2	"Human"	The Killers	—	22 September 2008	21 January 2009	1,318		(Note: "Human" was the most streamed song on Spotify in 2008. The exact date and number of streams when it became the most streamed song is unknown. It is not known if any song surpassed it prior to "Radioactive".)
1	"Viva la Vida"	Coldplay	—	25 May 2008	31 October 2008	83		(Note: The exact date and number of streams that "Viva la Vida" had when it became Spotify's most streamed song is unknown.)
As of 20 November 2026

== Milestones and achievements for songs ==
=== Weekly number-one songs ===
Key
#	Indicates current number-one song
‡	Indicates number-one Spotify Wrapped song of the year (Note: Sources:)

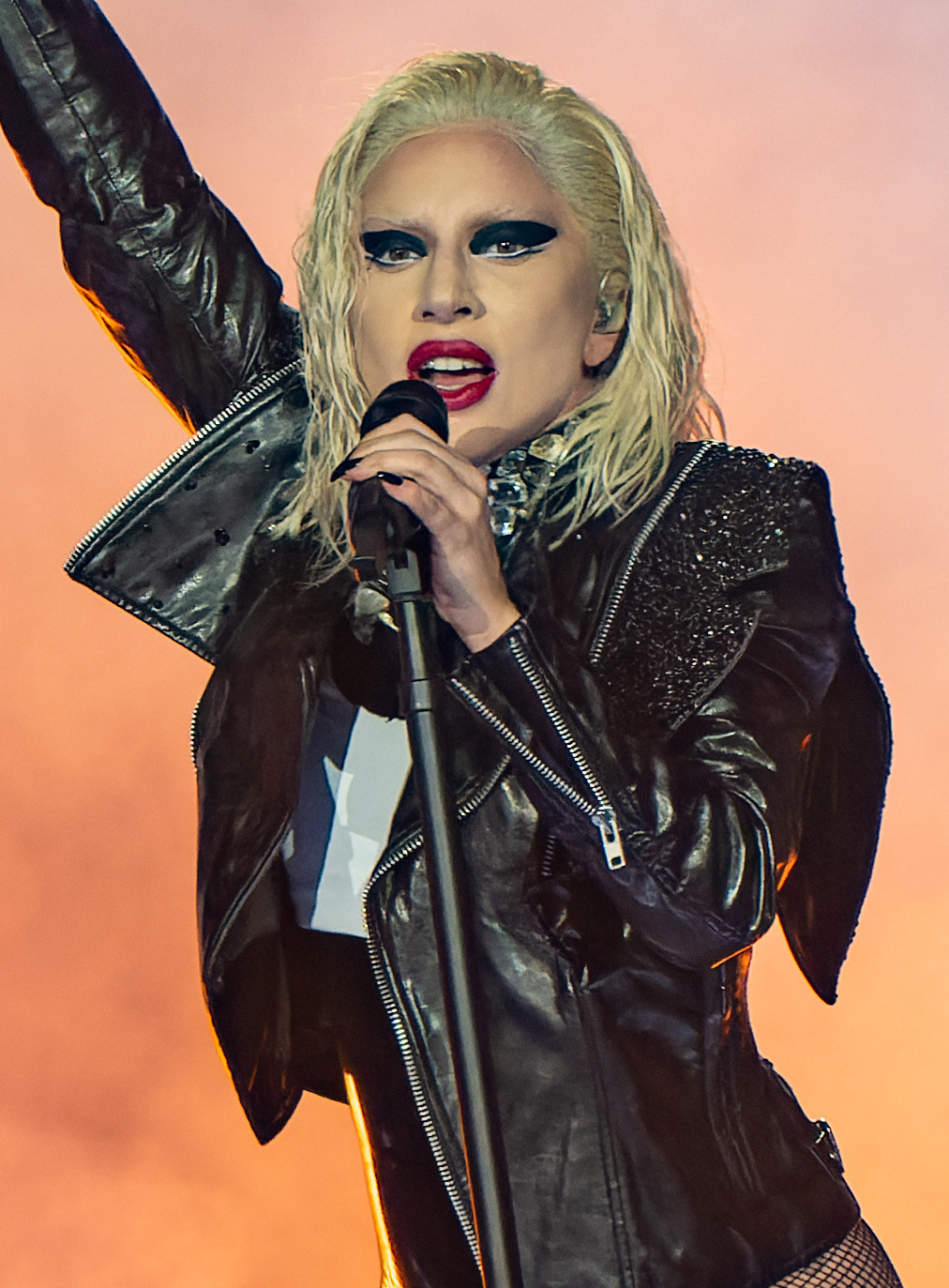
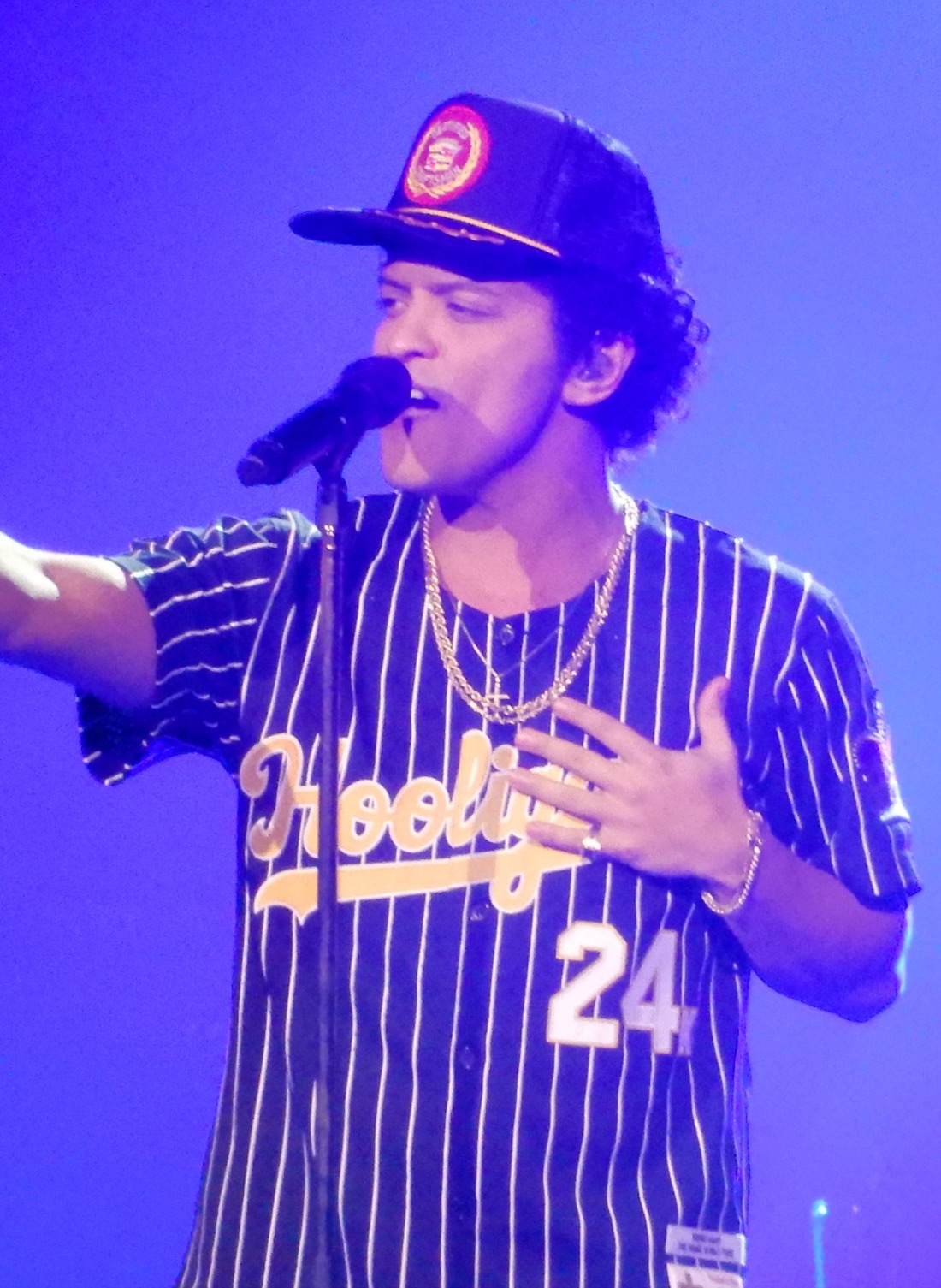
Lady Gaga (top) and Bruno Mars' (bottom) "Die with a Smile" is the longest-running number one song and the most-streamed in the top's period on Spotify.

List of number-one songs on Spotify
Song	Artist(s)	Release date	Issue date	Wks.	Avs.
"Starboy"	The Weeknd featuring Daft Punk	21 September 2016	29 December 2016	2	25.5
"Shape of You" ‡	Ed Sheeran	6 January 2017	12 January 2017	14	51.9
"Humble"	Kendrick Lamar	30 March 2017	20 April 2017	1	41.4
"Despacito (remix)"	Luis Fonsi featuring Daddy Yankee and Justin Bieber	17 April 2017	27 April 2017	14	45.9
"Mi Gente"	J Balvin featuring Willy William	30 June 2017	3 August 2017	4	32.1
"Look What You Made Me Do"	Taylor Swift	24 August 2017	31 August 2017	2	39.8
"Too Good at Goodbyes"	Sam Smith	8 September 2017	14 September 2017	1	30.7
"Rockstar"	Post Malone featuring 21 Savage	15 September 2017	21 September 2017	17	38.6
"Havana"	Camila Cabello featuring Young Thug	3 August 2017	18 January 2018	1	30.9
"God's Plan" ‡	Drake	19 January 2018	25 January 2018	10	48.8
"Call Out My Name"	The Weeknd	30 March 2018	5 April 2018	1	40.6
"God's Plan" ‡ (2)	Drake	19 January 2018	12 April 2018	1	37.5
"Nice for What"	Drake	6 April 2018	19 April 2018	2	40.7
"Better Now"	Post Malone	27 April 2018	3 May 2018	2	38.2
"This Is America"	Childish Gambino	5 May 2018	17 May 2018	1	34.9
"Better Now" (2)	Post Malone	27 April 2018	24 May 2018	4	30.2
"Nonstop"	Drake	29 June 2018	5 July 2018	1	43.7
"In My Feelings"	Drake	29 June 2018	12 July 2018	8	51.5
"Lucky You"	Eminem featuring Joyner Lucas	31 August 2018	6 September 2018	1	34.9
"I Love It"	Kanye West featuring Lil Pump	7 September 2018	13 September 2018	3	32.9
"Taki Taki"	DJ Snake featuring Selena Gomez, Ozuna and Cardi B	28 September 2018	4 October 2018	2	31.3
"Mia"	Bad Bunny featuring Drake	12 October 2018	18 October 2018	1	39.6
"Taki Taki" (2)	DJ Snake featuring Selena Gomez, Ozuna and Cardi B	28 September 2018	25 October 2018	2	40.5
"Thank U, Next"	Ariana Grande	3 November 2018	8 November 2018	7	46.0
"All I Want for Christmas Is You"	Mariah Carey	1 November 1994	27 December 2018	1	39.6
"Thank U, Next" (2)	Ariana Grande	3 November 2018	3 January 2019	1	31.2
"Sunflower"	Post Malone featuring Swae Lee	18 October 2018	17 January 2019	2	33.6
"7 Rings"	Ariana Grande	18 January 2019	24 January 2019	10	47.9
"Bad Guy"	Billie Eilish	29 March 2019	4 April 2019	6 (Note: The combined streams of the two "Old Town Road" versions were enough to surpass "Bad Guy" for 5 consecutive weeks (they would go on to spend a total of 10 non-consecutive weeks at the top when combined, with an average of 57.8 million weekly streams), but neither of them got enough streams individually to peak at number one.)	42.6
"I Don't Care"	Ed Sheeran featuring Justin Bieber	10 May 2019	16 May 2019	6 (Note: The combined streams of the two "Old Town Road" versions were enough to surpass "I Don't Care" for 5 consecutive weeks (they would go on to spend a total of 10 non-consecutive weeks at the top when combined, with an average of 57.8 million weekly streams), but neither of them got enough streams individually to peak at number one.)	44.0
"Señorita" ‡	Shawn Mendes and Camila Cabello	21 June 2019	27 June 2019	11	56.9
"Circles"	Post Malone	30 August 2019	12 September 2019	1	43.4
"Señorita" ‡ (2)	Shawn Mendes and Camila Cabello	21 June 2019	19 September 2019	3	38.7
"Highest in the Room"	Travis Scott	4 October 2019	10 October 2019	1	48.2
"Dance Monkey"	Tones and I	10 May 2019	17 October 2019	2	42.9
"Lose You to Love Me"	Selena Gomez	23 October 2019	31 October 2019	1	47.2
"Dance Monkey" (2)	Tones and I	10 May 2019	7 November 2019	14	46.9
"The Box"	Roddy Ricch	6 December 2019	13 February 2020	1	46.2
"Dance Monkey" (3)	Tones and I	10 May 2019	20 February 2020	1	43.7
"Blinding Lights" ‡	The Weeknd	29 November 2019	27 February 2020	9	44.2
"The Scotts"	Travis Scott and Kid Cudi	23 April 2020	30 April 2020	1	48.4
"Blinding Lights" ‡ (2)	The Weeknd	29 November 2019	7 May 2020	3	37.8
"Rain on Me"	Lady Gaga and Ariana Grande	22 May 2020	28 May 2020	1	41.6
"Rockstar"	DaBaby featuring Roddy Ricch	17 April 2020	4 June 2020	2	38.0
"Blinding Lights" ‡ (3)	The Weeknd	29 November 2019	18 June 2020	1	34.4
"Rockstar" (2)	DaBaby featuring Roddy Ricch	17 April 2020	25 June 2020	5	37.1
"Cardigan"	Taylor Swift	24 July 2020	30 July 2020	1	35.7
"Savage Love (Laxed – Siren Beat)"	Jawsh 685 featuring Jason Derulo	11 June 2020	6 August 2020	2	32.2
"WAP"	Cardi B featuring Megan Thee Stallion	7 August 2020	20 August 2020	5	46.0
"Mood"	24kGoldn featuring Iann Dior	24 July 2020	24 September 2020	5	38.3
"Positions"	Ariana Grande	23 October 2020	29 October 2020	2	41.5
"Dakiti"	Bad Bunny featuring Jhay Cortez	30 October 2020	12 November 2020	6	47.7
"All I Want for Christmas Is You" (2)	Mariah Carey	1 November 1994	24 December 2020	1	53.4
"Dakiti" (2)	Bad Bunny featuring Jhay Cortez	30 October 2020	31 December 2020	2	32.9
"Drivers License" ‡	Olivia Rodrigo	8 January 2021	14 January 2021	10	50.0
"Peaches"	Justin Bieber featuring Daniel Caesar and Giveon	19 March 2021	25 March 2021	3	48.0
"Montero (Call Me by Your Name)"	Lil Nas X	26 March 2021	15 April 2021	5	49.4
"Good 4 U"	Olivia Rodrigo	14 May 2021	20 May 2021	7	63.2
"Beggin'"	Måneskin	8 December 2017	8 July 2021	4	51.0
"Stay"	The Kid LAROI and Justin Bieber	9 July 2021	5 August 2021	11	60.8
"Easy on Me"	Adele	15 October 2021	21 October 2021	4	57.2
"All Too Well (10 Minute Version)"	Taylor Swift	12 November 2021	18 November 2021	1	41.9
"Easy on Me" (2)	Adele	15 October 2021	25 November 2021	3	44.8
"ABCDEFU"	Gayle	13 August 2021	16 December 2021	1	34.4
"All I Want for Christmas Is You" (3)	Mariah Carey	1 November 1994	23 December 2021	2	40.1
"Stay" (2)	The Kid LAROI and Justin Bieber	9 July 2021	6 January 2022	1	32.3
"ABCDEFU" (2)	Gayle	13 August 2021	13 January 2022	2	31.8
"Heat Waves"	Glass Animals	29 June 2020	27 January 2022	10	30.7
"As It Was" ‡	Harry Styles	1 April 2022	7 April 2022	9	65.2
"Running Up That Hill (A Deal with God)"	Kate Bush	5 August 1985	9 June 2022	1	57.2
"As It Was" ‡ (2)	Harry Styles	1 April 2022	16 June 2022	1	52.7
"Glimpse of Us"	Joji	10 June 2022	23 June 2022	1	57.4
"As It Was" ‡ (3)	Harry Styles	1 April 2022	30 June 2022	1	48.1
"Running Up That Hill (A Deal with God)" (2)	Kate Bush	5 August 1985	7 July 2022	2	47.9
"Quevedo: Bzrp Music Sessions, Vol. 52"	Bizarrap and Quevedo	6 July 2022	15 July 2022	9	45.9
"Shut Down"	Blackpink	16 September 2022	22 September 2022	1	39.2
"Unholy"	Sam Smith featuring Kim Petras	22 September 2022	29 September 2022	4	51.8
"Anti-Hero"	Taylor Swift	21 October 2022	27 October 2022	3	63.9
"Unholy" (2)	Sam Smith featuring Kim Petras	22 September 2022	17 November 2022	3	41.0
"All I Want for Christmas Is You" (4)	Mariah Carey	1 November 1994	8 December 2022	4	46.2
"Kill Bill"	SZA	9 December 2022	5 January 2023	2	44.4
"Flowers" ‡	Miley Cyrus	13 January 2023	19 January 2023	7	83.5
"TQG"	Karol G and Shakira	24 February 2023	9 March 2023	1	57.1
"Flowers" ‡ (2)	Miley Cyrus	13 January 2023	16 March 2023	5	47.3
"Ella Baila Sola"	Eslabon Armado and Peso Pluma	17 March 2023	20 April 2023	2	50.2
"Un x100to"	Grupo Frontera and Bad Bunny	17 April 2023	4 May 2023	2	53.2
"Ella Baila Sola" (2)	Eslabon Armado and Peso Pluma	17 March 2023	18 May 2023	7	43.0
"Vampire"	Olivia Rodrigo	30 June 2023	6 July 2023	1	52.0
"Lala"	Myke Towers	23 March 2023	13 July 2023	1	39.4
"Seven"	Jungkook featuring Latto	14 July 2023	20 July 2023	8	63.9
"Paint the Town Red"	Doja Cat	4 August 2023	14 September 2023	4	52.1
"Seven" (2)	Jungkook featuring Latto	14 July 2023	12 October 2023	1	43.2
"Monaco"	Bad Bunny	13 October 2023	19 October 2023	1	50.0
"Si No Estás"	Iñigo Quintero	23 September 2022	26 October 2023	1	40.0
"Is It Over Now?"	Taylor Swift	27 October 2023	2 November 2023	1	44.8
"Standing Next to You"	Jungkook	3 November 2023	9 November 2023	1	39.2
"Greedy"	Tate McRae	15 September 2023	16 November 2023	3	38.4
"All I Want for Christmas Is You" (5)	Mariah Carey	1 November 1994	7 December 2023	4	56.1
"Greedy" (2)	Tate McRae	15 September 2023	4 January 2024	1	33.9
"La Diabla"	Xavi	30 November 2023	11 January 2024	1	34.2
"Yes, And?"	Ariana Grande	12 January 2024	18 January 2024	1	53.9
"La Diabla" (2)	Xavi	30 November 2023	25 January 2024	3	37.9
"Beautiful Things"	Benson Boone	18 January 2024	15 February 2024	4	43.4
"We Can't Be Friends (Wait for Your Love)"	Ariana Grande	8 March 2024	14 March 2024	2	58.0
"Beautiful Things" (2)	Benson Boone	18 January 2024	28 March 2024	2	54.7
"I Like the Way You Kiss Me"	Artemas	19 March 2024	11 April 2024	2	60.2
"Fortnight"	Taylor Swift featuring Post Malone	19 April 2024	25 April 2024	2	84.9
"Espresso" ‡	Sabrina Carpenter	11 April 2024	9 May 2024	1	66.9
"Million Dollar Baby"	Tommy Richman	26 April 2024	16 May 2024	2	76.6
"Lunch"	Billie Eilish	17 May 2024	30 May 2024	1	63.2
"Espresso" ‡ (2)	Sabrina Carpenter	11 April 2024	6 June 2024	2	70.6
"Please Please Please"	Sabrina Carpenter	6 June 2024	20 June 2024	2	77.8
"Espresso" ‡ (3)	Sabrina Carpenter	11 April 2024	4 July 2024	2	61.0
"Birds of a Feather"	Billie Eilish	17 May 2024	18 July 2024	1	57.8
"Who"	Jimin	19 July 2024	25 July 2024	3	61.2
"Birds of a Feather" (2)	Billie Eilish	17 May 2024	15 August 2024	2	60.9
"Die with a Smile"	Lady Gaga and Bruno Mars	16 August 2024	29 August 2024	8	73.5
"Apt."	Rosé and Bruno Mars	18 October 2024	24 October 2024	2	86.3
"Die with a Smile" (2)	Lady Gaga and Bruno Mars	16 August 2024	7 November 2024	3	70.5
"Apt." (2)	Rosé and Bruno Mars	18 October 2024	28 November 2024	1	68.7
"Die with a Smile" (3)	Lady Gaga and Bruno Mars	16 August 2024	5 December 2024	2	67.1
"All I Want for Christmas Is You" (6)	Mariah Carey	1 November 1994	26 December 2024	1	92.5
"Die with a Smile" ‡ (4)	Lady Gaga and Bruno Mars	16 August 2024	2 January 2025	2	69.3
"DTMF"	Bad Bunny	5 January 2025	16 January 2025	3	79.6
"Die with a Smile" ‡ (5)	Lady Gaga and Bruno Mars	16 August 2024	6 February 2025	14	50.9
"Ordinary"	Alex Warren	7 February 2025	15 May 2025	4	40.0
"Manchild"	Sabrina Carpenter	5 June 2025	12 June 2025	1	39.8
"Ordinary" (2)	Alex Warren	7 February 2025	19 June 2025	3	37.3
"Back to Friends"	Sombr	27 December 2024	10 July 2025	1	36.6
"Jump"	Blackpink	11 July 2025	17 July 2025	1	44.8
"Golden"	Huntrix	20 June 2025	24 July 2025	11	52.1
"The Fate of Ophelia"	Taylor Swift	3 October 2025	9 October 2025	11	61.5
"Last Christmas"	Wham!	3 December 1984	25 December 2025	1	85.8
"The Fate of Ophelia" (2)	Taylor Swift	3 October 2025	1 January 2026	1	44.4
"End of Beginning"	Djo	16 September 2022	8 January 2026	5	50.6
"DTMF" (2)	Bad Bunny	5 January 2025	12 February 2026	4	56.5
"American Girls"	Harry Styles	6 March 2026	12 March 2026	1	37.5
"Babydoll"	Dominic Fike	16 October 2018	19 March 2026	1	35.1
"Swim"	BTS	20 March 2026	26 March 2026	4	62.4
"Beauty and a Beat"	Justin Bieber featuring Nicki Minaj	15 June 2012	23 April 2026	4	54.4
"Billie Jean"	Michael Jackson	29 November 1982	21 May 2026	2	40.7
"Hate That I Made You Love Me"	Ariana Grande	29 May 2026	4 June 2026	2	42.5
"Stupid Song"	Olivia Rodrigo	12 June 2026	18 June 2026	2	42.1
"Billie Jean" (2)	Michael Jackson	29 November 1982	2 July 2026	1	30.1
"Dai Dai"	Shakira and Burna Boy	15 May 2026	9 July 2026	4	35.2
"Hate That I Made You Love Me" (2)	Ariana Grande	29 May 2026	6 August 2026	1	36.8
"Dai Dai" (2)	Shakira and Burna Boy	15 May 2026	13 August 2026	2	27.7
"Earrings"	Malcolm Todd	5 April 2024	27 August 2026	1	25.1
"Bby Wow"	Karol G, Judeline and Rusowsky	7 August 2026	3 September 2026	4	39.9
"Patient Zero"	Taylor Swift	25 September 2026	1 October 2026	1	47.6
"Bby Wow" (2)	Karol G, Judeline and Rusowsky	7 August 2026	8 October 2026	2	36.0
"Housewife"	Tate McRae	15 October 2026	22 October 2026	3	41.2
"Bby Wow" (3) #	Karol G, Judeline and Rusowsky	7 August 2026	12 November 2026	2	32.4

=== Annual top five most-streamed songs ===
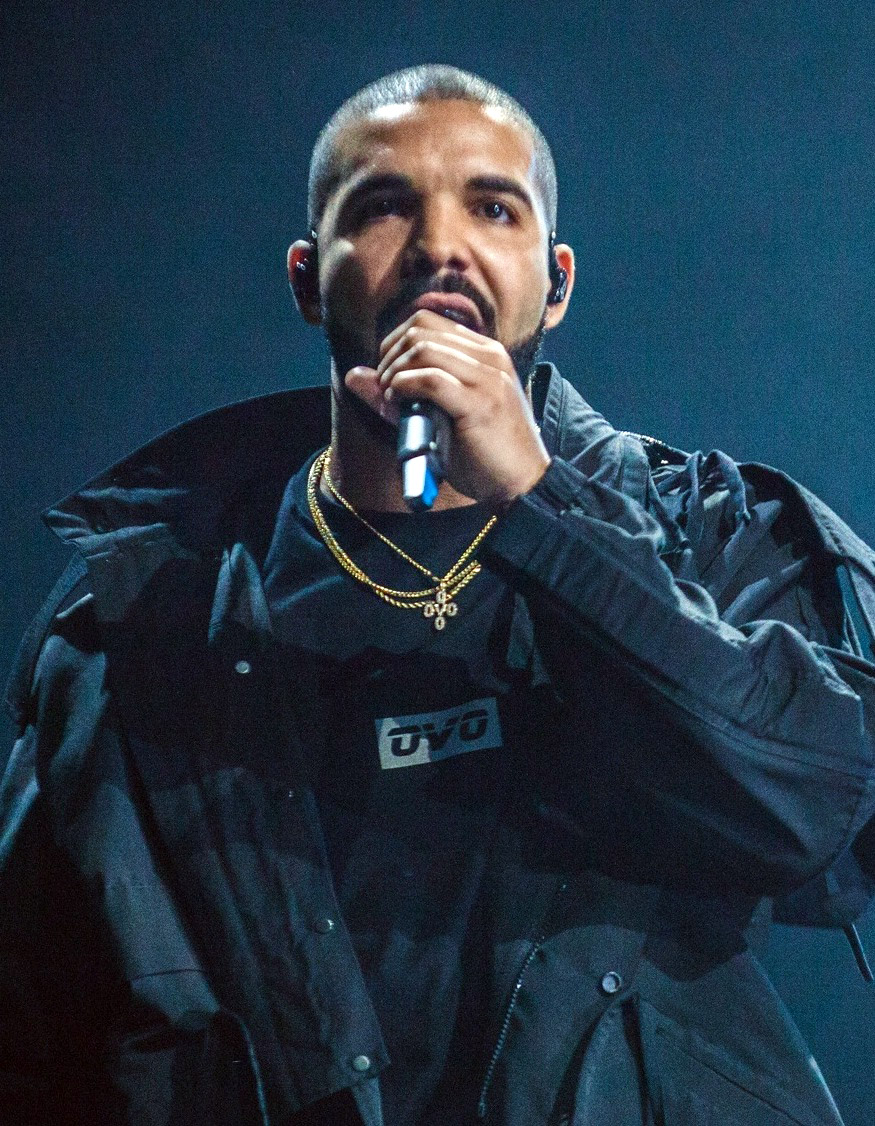
Drake has topped the annual most-streamed songs list a record two times.

The following table lists the five songs that Spotify reported as most-played in each calendar year.

Year	Artist and Song ranking				
Year	1	2	3	4	5
2025	Lady Gaga & Bruno Mars "Die with a Smile" (1.7 billion)	Billie Eilish "Birds of a Feather"	Rosé & Bruno Mars "Apt."	Alex Warren "Ordinary"	Bad Bunny "DTMF"
2024	Sabrina Carpenter "Espresso" (1.6 billion)	Benson Boone "Beautiful Things"	Billie Eilish "Birds of a Feather"	FloyyMenor & Cris MJ "Gata Only"	Teddy Swims "Lose Control"
2023	Miley Cyrus "Flowers" (1.6 billion)	SZA "Kill Bill"	Harry Styles "As It Was"	Jung Kook "Seven" (feat. Latto)	Eslabon Armado, Peso Pluma "Ella Baila Sola"
2022	Harry Styles "As It Was" (1.6 billion)	Glass Animals "Heat Waves"	The Kid Laroi "Stay (with Justin Bieber)"	Bad Bunny feat. Chencho Corleone "Me Porto Bonito"	Bad Bunny "Tití Me Preguntó"
2021	Olivia Rodrigo "Drivers License" (1.2 billion)	Lil Nas X "Montero (Call Me By Your Name)"	The Kid Laroi "Stay (with Justin Bieber)"	Olivia Rodrigo "Good 4 U"	Dua Lipa "Levitating" (feat. DaBaby)
2020	The Weeknd "Blinding Lights" (1.6 billion)	Tones and I "Dance Monkey"	Roddy Ricch "The Box"	Imanbek & Saint Jhn "Roses – Imanbek Remix"	Dua Lipa "Don't Start Now"
2019	Shawn Mendes & Camila Cabello "Señorita" (1 billion)	Billie Eilish "Bad Guy"	Post Malone & Swae Lee "Sunflower"	Ariana Grande "7 Rings"	Lil Nas X & Billy Ray Cyrus "Old Town Road – Remix"
2018	Drake "God's Plan" (1.1 billion)	XXXTentacion "Sad!"	Post Malone "Rockstar (feat. 21 Savage)"	Post Malone "Psycho (feat. Ty Dolla $ign)"	Drake "In My Feelings"
2017	Ed Sheeran "Shape of You" (1.5 billion)	Luis Fonsi, Daddy Yankee & Justin Bieber "Despacito (Remix)"	Luis Fonsi & Daddy Yankee "Despacito"	The Chainsmokers "Something Just Like This" (with Coldplay)	DJ Khaled "I'm the One" (feat. Justin Bieber, Chance the Rapper, Quavo & Lil Wayne)
2016	Drake "One Dance" (feat. Wizkid and Kyla) (960 million)	Mike Posner "I Took A Pill in Ibiza – Seeb Remix"	The Chainsmokers "Don't Let Me Down" (feat. Daya)	Rihanna "Work" (feat. Drake)	Sia "Cheap Thrills"
2015	Major Lazer "Lean On" (feat. MØ & DJ Snake) (540 million)	Omi "Cheerleader – Felix Jaehn Remix Radio Edit"	Mark Ronson "Uptown Funk" (feat. Bruno Mars)	Wiz Khalifa "See You Again" (feat. Charlie Puth)	Ellie Goulding "Love Me Like You Do"
2014	Pharrell Williams "Happy" (260 million)	Clean Bandit "Rather Be" (feat. Jess Glynne)	Calvin Harris "Summer"	Katy Perry "Dark Horse" (feat. Juicy J)	John Legend "All of Me"
2013	Macklemore & Ryan Lewis "Can't Hold Us" (feat. Ray Dalton)	Avicii "Wake Me Up"	Macklemore & Ryan Lewis "Thrift Shop" (feat. Wanz)	Daft Punk "Get Lucky" (feat. Pharrell Williams and Nile Rodgers)	Imagine Dragons "Radioactive"
2012	Gotye "Somebody That I Used To Know" (feat. Kimbra)	Carly Rae Jepsen "Call Me Maybe"	Fun. "We Are Young" (feat. Janelle Monáe)	Flo Rida "Whistle"	Flo Rida "Wild Ones" (feat. Sia)
2011	Don Omar, Lucenzo "Danza Kuduro"	Unknown			
2010	Eminem, Rihanna "Love The Way You Lie"	Unknown			
2009	The Black Eyed Peas "I Gotta Feeling"	Flo Rida "Right Around"	David Guetta "Sexy Bitch" (feat. Akon)	Lady Gaga "Poker Face"	Beyoncé "Halo"
2008	The Killers "Human"	Unknown			

=== Most-streamed songs in a single day ===
==== Non-seasonal songs ====
The following table lists the 10 non-seasonal songs to receive the most streams in a single day, as registered on the Spotify Global Daily chart.

Rank	Song	Artist(s)	Streams	Date published	Date achieved	Ref.
1	"The Fate of Ophelia"	Taylor Swift	30,987,370	3 October 2025		
2	"Fortnight"	Taylor Swift featuring Post Malone	25,204,472	19 April 2024		
3	"Elizabeth Taylor"	Taylor Swift	23,974,787	3 October 2025		
4	"Opalite"	Taylor Swift	23,716,087	3 October 2025		
5	"Father Figure"	Taylor Swift	21,802,376	3 October 2025		
6	"Eldest Daughter"	Taylor Swift	19,963,843	3 October 2025		
7	"Easy on Me"	Adele	19,749,704	14 October 2021	15 October 2021	
8	"Actually Romantic"	Taylor Swift	19,391,100	3 October 2025		
9	"The Tortured Poets Department"	Taylor Swift	19,089,937	19 April 2024		
10	"Wood"	Taylor Swift	19,016,766	3 October 2025		

==== Christmas seasonal songs ====
The following table lists the 10 songs associated with the Christmas season that received the most streams in a single day, as registered on the Spotify Global Daily chart. Historically, these songs have performed best yearly on 24 December, and often reach new peaks with each season.

Rank	Song	Artist(s)	Streams	Date published	Date achieved	Ref.
1	"All I Want For Christmas Is You"	Mariah Carey	24,863,570	28 October 1994	24 December 2024	
2	"Last Christmas"	Wham!	24,556,791	3 December 1984	24 December 2024	
3	"Rockin' Around the Christmas Tree"	Brenda Lee	21,635,497	24 November 1958	24 December 2024	
4	"Jingle Bell Rock"	Bobby Helms	18,917,096	28 November 1957	24 December 2024	
5	"Let It Snow! Let It Snow! Let It Snow!"	Dean Martin	16,333,308	1959	24 December 2025	
6	"Santa Tell Me"	Ariana Grande	16,090,412	24 November 2014	24 December 2025	
7	"Underneath the Tree"	Kelly Clarkson	14,926,975	5 November 2013	24 December 2025	
8	"It's Beginning to Look a Lot Like Christmas"	Michael Bublé	14,790,986	21 October 2011	24 December 2023	
9	"Snowman"	Sia	13,974,518	9 November 2017	24 December 2025	
10	"It's the Most Wonderful Time of the Year"	Andy Williams	13,789,130	14 October 1963	24 December 2023	
As of 25 December 2025

=== Historical number one most-streamed non-seasonal songs in a single day ===
The following table lists the progression by date of number one ranked most-streamed songs in a single day, as registered on the Spotify Global Weekly chart.

Key
#	Indicates most days at number one

Song	Artist(s)	Streams	Date published	Date achieved	Days held	Ref.
"The Fate of Ophelia"	Taylor Swift	30,987,370	4 October 2025		413	
"Fortnight"	Taylor Swift featuring Post Malone	25,204,472	19 April 2024		534	
"Easy on Me"	Adele	19,749,704	15 October 2021		918 #	
"Drivers License"	Olivia Rodrigo	13,714,177	8 January 2021	21 January 2021	274	
"I Don't Care"	Ed Sheeran and Justin Bieber	10,977,389	10 May 2019		622	
"7 Rings"	Ariana Grande	10,445,538	18 January 2019	8 February 2019	91	
"Sad!"	XXXTentacion	10,415,088	2 March 2018	19 June 2018	234	
"Shape of You"	Ed Sheeran	9,891,056	6 January 2017	3 March 2017	473	
As of 20 November 2026

=== Most-streamed songs in a single week ===
The following table lists the top 10 most-streamed in a single week, as registered on the Spotify Global Weekly chart.

Rank	Song	Artist(s)	Streams	Date published	Date achieved	Ref.
1	"The Fate of Ophelia"	Taylor Swift	128,896,137	3 October 2025	10 October 2025	
2	"Flowers"	Miley Cyrus	115,156,896	13 January 2023	26 January 2023	
3	"Fortnight"	Taylor Swift featuring Post Malone	102,878,399	19 April 2024	25 April 2024	
4	"Opalite"	Taylor Swift	93,572,415	3 October 2025	10 October 2025	
5	"All I Want for Christmas Is You"	Mariah Carey	92,546,541	28 October 1994	26 December 2024	
6	"Last Christmas"	Wham!	91,090,914	3 December 1984	26 December 2024	
7	"Seven"	Jungkook featuring Latto	89,748,171	14 July 2023	20 July 2023	
8	"DTMF"	Bad Bunny	88,786,254	5 January 2025	16 January 2025	
9	"Apt."	Rosé and Bruno Mars	87,041,494	18 October 2024	31 October 2024	
10	"Elizabeth Taylor"	Taylor Swift	85,348,366	3 October 2025	10 October 2025	
As of 22 April 2026

=== Historical number one most-streamed songs in a single week ===
The following table lists the progression by date of number one ranked most-streamed songs in a single week, as registered on the Spotify Global Weekly chart.

Key
#	Indicates most days at number one

Song	Artist(s)	Streams	Date published	Date achieved	Days held	Ref.
"The Fate of Ophelia"	Taylor Swift	128,896,137	3 October 2025	10 October 2025	407	
"Flowers"	Miley Cyrus	115,156,896	13 January 2023	26 January 2023	987 #	
"Easy on Me"	Adele	84,952,932	15 October 2021	21 October 2021	462	
"Good 4 U"	Olivia Rodrigo	84,131,760	14 May 2021	27 May 2021	153	
"Drivers License"	Olivia Rodrigo	80,764,045	8 January 2021	21 January 2021	126	
"7 Rings"	Ariana Grande	71,467,874	18 January 2019	24 January 2019	728	
"In My Feelings"	Drake	67,499,798	29 June 2018	19 July 2018	189	
As of 20 November 2026

=== Longest-running number-one songs by days ===
The following table lists the songs with more than 100 days in the number 1 position on the Global Spotify Chart.

Rank	Song	Artist(s)	Days at No. 1	Date Published	Date achieved	Ref.
1	"Die with a Smile"	Lady Gaga and Bruno Mars	201	16 August 2024	10 May 2025	
2	"Dance Monkey"	Tones and I	120	10 May 2019	23 February 2020	
3	"Rockstar"	Post Malone featuring 21 Savage	114	15 September 2017	11 January 2018	
4	"Señorita"	Shawn Mendes and Camila Cabello	102	21 June 2019	3 October 2019	
5	"Despacito (Remix)"	Luis Fonsi featuring Daddy Yankee and Justin Bieber	101	17 April 2017	30 July 2017	

=== Progression of the record for longest-running non-seasonal number-one songs by days ===
The following table lists the progression for the record of most number of days for non-seasonal songs in the number 1 position on the Global Spotify Chart, showing the date the record was achieved and the length the record was held (in the case of the current record holder, "Die with a Smile", has been held).

key
#	Indicates most days record held

Song	Artist(s)	Days at No. 1	Date Published	Date achieved	Days Held	Ref.
"Die with a Smile"	Lady Gaga and Bruno Mars	201	16 August 2024	8 February 2025	650	
"Dance Monkey"	Tones and I	120	10 May 2019	4 February 2020	1832 #	
"Rockstar"	Post Malone featuring 21 Savage	114	15 September 2017	29 December 2017	768	
"Despacito (Remix)"	Luis Fonsi featuring Daddy Yankee and Justin Bieber	101	17 April 2017	27 July 2017	156	
"Shape of You"	Ed Sheeran	98	6 January 2017	13 April 2017	108	

=== Fastest songs to reach one billion streams ===
The following table lists the top 10 songs which have reached one billion streams the fastest.

Rank	Song	Artist(s)	Days to 1bn	Date Published	Date achieved	Ref.
1	"Die with a Smile"	Lady Gaga and Bruno Mars	96	16 August 2024	20 November 2024	
2	"Apt."	Rosé and Bruno Mars	100	18 October 2024	25 January 2025	
3	"Seven"	Jungkook featuring Latto	108	14 July 2023	30 October 2023	
4	"Flowers"	Miley Cyrus	112	12 January 2023	4 May 2023	
5	"Espresso"	Sabrina Carpenter	117	11 April 2024	6 August 2024	
6	"Stay"	The Kid Laroi and Justin Bieber	118	9 July 2021	4 November 2021	
6	"Who"	Jimin	118	19 July 2024	14 November 2024	
6	"As It Was"	Harry Styles	118	1 April 2022	28 July 2022	
9	"Birds of a Feather"	Billie Eilish	119	17 May 2024	13 September 2024	
10	"The Fate of Ophelia"	Taylor Swift	127	3 October 2025	7 February 2026	

=== Most consecutive days on the Daily Top Songs Global chart ===
The following table lists the top 10 songs with the most consecutive days on the Daily Top Songs Global chart.

Indicates a current streak.

Rank	Song	Artist	Streak (Note: The total number of consecutive days this entry has been on the chart.)	Ref.
1	"Sweater Weather"	The Neighbourhood	2,111 days (13 September 2020 – 24 June 2026)	
2	"Blinding Lights"	The Weeknd	1,852 days (29 November 2019 – 23 December 2024)	
3	"Starboy"	The Weeknd featuring Daft Punk	1,488 days (29 May 2022 – 24 June 2026)	
4	"I Wanna Be Yours"	Arctic Monkeys	1,439 days (17 July 2022 – 24 June 2026)	
5	"Another Love"	Tom Odell	1,094 days (26 December 2021 – 23 December 2024)	
6	"Shape of You"	Ed Sheeran	1,082 days (06 January 2017 – 23 December 2019)	
7	"Someone You Loved"	Lewis Capaldi	1,076 days (13 January 2019 – 23 December 2021)	
8	"Heat Waves"	Glass Animals	1,071 days (26 December 2020 – 1 December 2023)	
9	"Believer"	Imagine Dragons	1,056 days (02 February 2017 – 24 December 2019)	
10	"As It Was"	Harry Styles	996 days (31 March 2022 – 20 December 2024)	
As of 24 June 2026

=== Most days on the Daily Top Songs Global chart ===
The following table lists the top 10 songs with the most days on the Daily Top Songs Global chart.

Indicates a song currently charting.

Rank	Song	Artist	Total days on chart	Last seen	Ref.
1	"Perfect"	Ed Sheeran	3,153 days	23 June 2026	
2	"Believer"	Imagine Dragons	2,952 days	28 November 2025	
3	"Shape of You"	Ed Sheeran	2,910 days	24 June 2026	
4	"Lovely"	Billie Eilish and Khalid	2,769 days	24 March 2026	
5	"Blinding Lights"	The Weeknd	2,333 days	24 June 2026	
6	"Someone You Loved"	Lewis Capaldi	2,388 days	28 November 2025	
7	"Sunflower"	Post Malone and Swae Lee	2,384 days	24 June 2026	
8	"Say You Won't Let Go"	James Arthur	2,378 days	04 November 2025	
9	"Sweater Weather"	The Neighbourhood	2,130 days	24 June 2026	
10	"Starboy"	The Weeknd featuring Daft Punk	2,089 days	24 June 2026	
As of 24 June 2026

=== Biggest single-day upward movements on the Daily Top Songs Global chart ===
The following table lists the top 10 songs with the largest single-day climbs on the Daily Top Songs Global chart.

No. of positions	Chart movement	Artist(s)	Song	Date	Ref.
190	196–6	Post Malone and Swae Lee	"Sunflower"	19 October 2018	
182	199–17	Cartel de Santa featuring La Kelly	"Shorty Party"	06 March 2023	
180	186–6	6ix9ine featuring Lil Baby	"Tic Toc"	28 November 2018	
179	199–20	Selena Gomez	"Back To You"	11 May 2018	
179	199–20	Michael Jackson	"Thriller"	31 October 2018	
177	195–18	Taylor Swift	"Love Story (Taylor's Version)"	09 April 2021	
175	179–4	6ix9ine featuring Kanye West and Nicki Minaj	"Mama"	28 November 2018	
174	200–26	Don Toliver	"ATM"	30 January 2026	
173	197–24	Rihanna	"Diamonds"	13 February 2023	
168	191–23	Silk City and Dua Lipa	"Electricity"	07 September 2018	
As of 24 June 2026

=== Biggest single-day downward movements on the Daily Top Songs Global chart ===
The following table lists the top 10 songs with the largest single-day drops on the Daily Top Songs Global chart that remained on the chart. Holiday songs are excluded from this list.

No. of positions	Chart movement	Artist(s)	Song	Date	Ref.
169	18–187	Brenno & Matheus, DJ Ari SL	"Descer pra BC"	02 January 2025	
157	40–197	Ed Sheeran	"A Little More"	09 August 2025	
156	33–189	Ed Sheeran	"Camera"	13 September 2025	
154	27–181	Lil Uzi Vert	"Crush Em"	01 July 2023	
153	46–199	XXXTentacion	"Introduction"	08 December 2018	
150	44–194	J. Cole and Future	"Run A Train"	07 February 2026	
148	43–191	J-Hope	"= (Equal Sign)"	16 July 2022	
148	50–198	Future, Metro Boomin	"Out Of My Hands"	13 April 2024	
147	37–184	Blackpink	"Fxxxboy"	28 February 2026	
146	27–173	Lauana Prado	"Me Leva Pra Casa / Escrito Nas Estrelas / Saudade (Ao Vivo)"	02 January 2024	
146	53–199	Tyla featuring Zara Larsson	"She Did It Again"	18 April 2026	
As of 24 June 2026

== Most-streamed albums ==
The following table lists the top 50 most-streamed albums.

Rank	Album	Artist(s)	Songs	Release date	Ref
1	Un Verano Sin Ti	Bad Bunny	23	6 May 2022	
2	Starboy (Note: The streams include those accumulated in the "Deluxe" version.)	The Weeknd	21	25 November 2016	
3	÷ (Note: The streams include those accumulated in the "Deluxe" version.)	Ed Sheeran	16	3 March 2017	
4	Sour	Olivia Rodrigo	11	21 May 2021	
5	SOS (Note: The streams include those accumulated in the "Deluxe: Lana" version.)	SZA	42	9 December 2022	
6	After Hours (Note: The streams include those accumulated in the "Deluxe" version.)	The Weeknd	18	20 March 2020	
7	Hollywood's Bleeding	Post Malone	17	6 September 2019	
8	Future Nostalgia (Note: The streams include those accumulated in "The Moonlight Edition".)	Dua Lipa	19	27 March 2020	
9	Dua Lipa (Note: The streams include those accumulated in "Complete Edition".)	Dua Lipa	25	2 June 2017	
10	AM	Arctic Monkeys	12	9 September 2013	
11	Lover	Taylor Swift	18	23 August 2019	
12	When We All Fall Asleep, Where Do We Go?	Billie Eilish	14	29 March 2019	
13	Debí Tirar Más Fotos	Bad Bunny	17	5 January 2025	
14	Purpose (Note: The streams include those accumulated in the "Deluxe" version.)	Justin Bieber	19	13 November 2015	
15	Doo-Wops & Hooligans	Bruno Mars	12	4 October 2010	
16	Beerbongs & Bentleys	Post Malone	18	27 April 2018	
17	? (Note: The streams include those accumulated in the "Deluxe" version.)	XXXTentacion	53	16 March 2018	
18	× (Note: The streams include those accumulated in "Wembley Edition".)	Ed Sheeran	23	20 June 2014	
19	Don't Smile at Me (Note: The streams include those accumulated in "Expanded Edition".)	Billie Eilish	11	11 August 2017	
20	YHLQMDLG	Bad Bunny	20	29 February 2020	
21	Views	Drake	20	29 April 2016	
22	Midnights (Note: The streams include those accumulated in "The Til Dawn Edition".)	Taylor Swift	23	21 October 2022	
23	Folklore (Note: The streams include those accumulated in "the long pond studio sessions [deluxe edition]".)	Taylor Swift	17	24 July 2020	
24	Beauty Behind the Madness	The Weeknd	14	28 August 2015	
25	Scorpion	Drake	25	29 June 2018	
26	Teenage Dream (Note: The streams include those accumulated in "The Complete Confection" version.)	Katy Perry	19	24 August 2010	
27	Astroworld	Travis Scott	17	3 August 2018	
28	Born to Die (Note: The streams include those accumulated in "Paradise Edition (Special Version)".)	Lana Del Rey	24	27 January 2012	
29	Fine Line	Harry Styles	12	13 December 2019	
30	Goodbye & Good Riddance	Juice Wrld	17	23 May 2018	
31	Hit Me Hard and Soft	Billie Eilish	10	17 May 2024	
32	The Fame / The Fame Monster (Note: The streams include those accumulated in "International Deluxe" version.)	Lady Gaga	24	19 August 2008	
33	Reputation	Taylor Swift	15	10 November 2017	
34	Short n' Sweet (Note: The streams include those accumulated in the "Deluxe" version.)	Sabrina Carpenter	17	23 August 2024	
35	Damn	Kendrick Lamar	14	14 April 2017	
36	1989 (Note: The streams include those accumulated in the "Deluxe" version.)	Taylor Swift	19	27 October 2014	
37	Divinely Uninspired to a Hellish Extent (Note: The streams include those accumulated in "Extended Edition".)	Lewis Capaldi	15	17 May 2019	
38	In the Lonely Hour (Note: The streams include those accumulated in "Drowning Shadows Edition".)	Sam Smith	23	26 May 2014	
39	Harry's House	Harry Styles	13	20 May 2022	
40	Justice (Note: The streams include those accumulated in "The Complete Edition".)	Justin Bieber	25	19 March 2021	
41	Planet Her (Note: The streams include those accumulated in the "Deluxe" version.)	Doja Cat	19	25 June 2021	
42	17	XXXTentacion	11	25 August 2017	
43	Evolve	Imagine Dragons	12	23 June 2017	
44	The Tortured Poets Department (Note: The streams include those accumulated in "The Anthology" version.)	Taylor Swift	31	19 April 2024	
45	Stoney (Note: The streams include those accumulated in "Complete Edition".)	Post Malone	34	9 December 2016	
46	Anti (Note: The streams include those accumulated in the "Deluxe" version.)	Rihanna	16	28 January 2016	
47	Thank U, Next	Ariana Grande	12	8 February 2019	
48	The Eminem Show (Note: The streams include those accumulated in "Expanded Edition".)	Eminem	38	26 May 2002	
49	21	Adele	11	24 January 2011	
50	Dangerous Woman	Ariana Grande	17	20 May 2016	
As of 17 November 2026

== Milestones and achievements for albums ==
=== Annual top five most-streamed albums ===
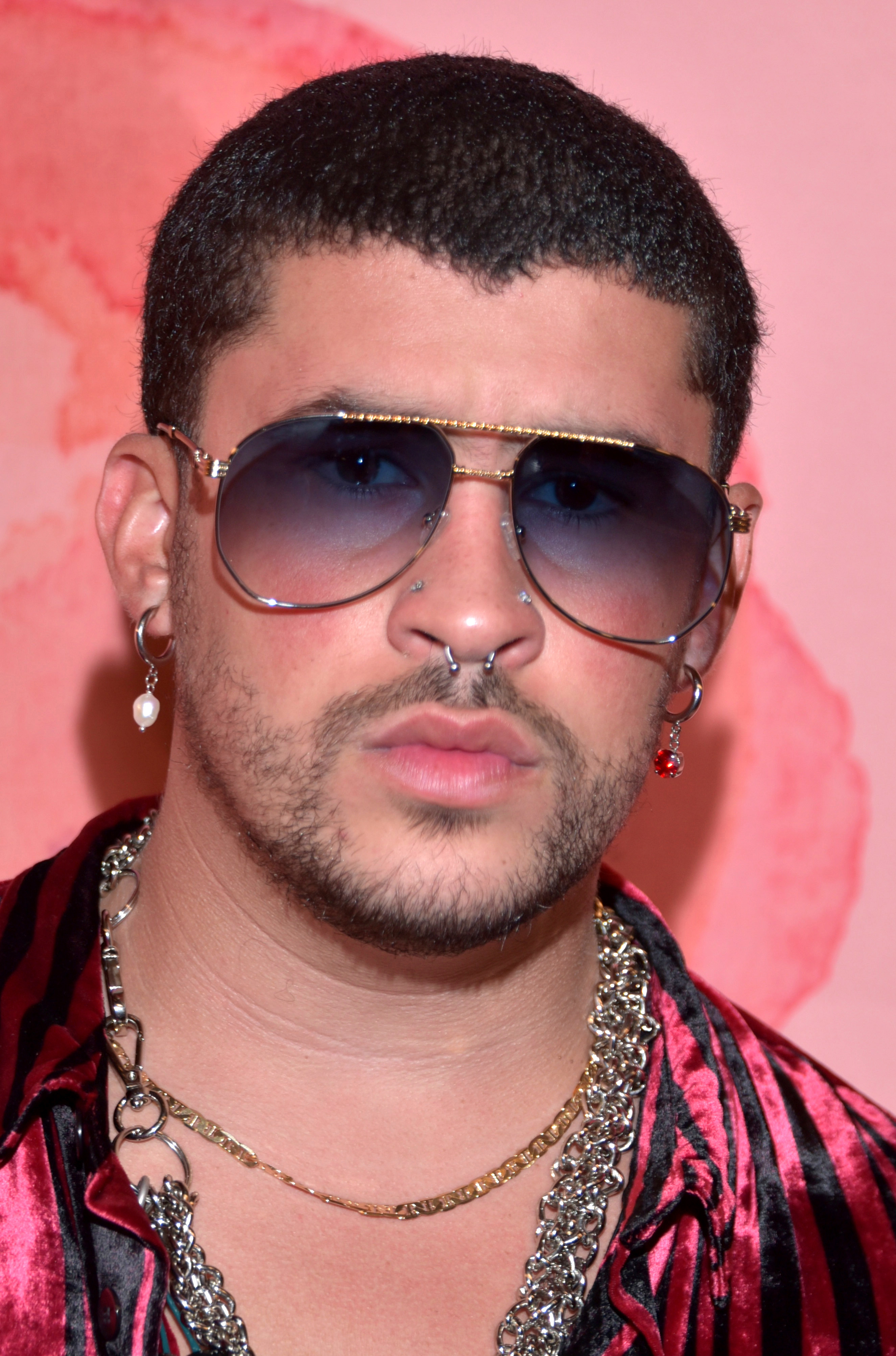
Bad Bunny has topped the annual most-streamed albums list a record four times.

The following table lists the five albums most-played on Spotify in each calendar year.

Year	1	2	3	4	5
2025	Bad Bunny; Debí Tirar Más Fotos	Various artists KPop Demon Hunters	Billie Eilish; Hit Me Hard and Soft	SZA; SOS Deluxe: Lana	Sabrina Carpenter; Short n' Sweet
2024	Taylor Swift; The Tortured Poets Department	Billie Eilish; Hit Me Hard and Soft	Sabrina Carpenter; Short n' Sweet	Karol G Mañana Será Bonito	Ariana Grande; Eternal Sunshine
2023	Bad Bunny; Un Verano Sin Ti	Taylor Swift; Midnights	SZA; SOS	The Weeknd; Starboy	Karol G Mañana Será Bonito
2022	Bad Bunny; Un Verano Sin Ti	Harry Styles; Harry's House	Olivia Rodrigo; Sour	Ed Sheeran =	Doja Cat; Planet Her
2021	Olivia Rodrigo; Sour	Dua Lipa; Future Nostalgia	Justin Bieber; Justice	Ed Sheeran =	Doja Cat; Planet Her
2020	Bad Bunny; YHLQMDLG	The Weeknd; After Hours	Post Malone; Hollywood's Bleeding	Harry Styles; Fine Line	Dua Lipa; Future Nostalgia
2019	Billie Eilish; When We All Fall Asleep, Where Do We Go?	Post Malone; Hollywood's Bleeding	Ariana Grande; Thank U, Next	Ed Sheeran; No.6 Collaborations Project	Shawn Mendes; Shawn Mendes
2018	Drake; Scorpion	Post Malone; Beerbongs & Bentleys	XXXTentacion ?	Dua Lipa; Dua Lipa	Ed Sheeran ÷
2017	Ed Sheeran ÷	Drake; More Life	Kendrick Lamar; Damn	The Weeknd; Starboy	Post Malone; Stoney
2016	Drake; Views	Justin Bieber; Purpose	Rihanna; Anti	Twenty One Pilots; Blurryface	The Weeknd; Beauty Behind The Madness
2015	The Weeknd; Beauty Behind the Madness	Drake; If You're Reading This It's Too Late	Major Lazer; Peace Is the Mission	Avicii; Stories	Meghan Trainor; Title
2014	Ed Sheeran ×	Sam Smith; In The Lonely Hour	Iggy Azalea; The New Classic	Pharrell Williams; Girl	Ariana Grande; My Everything
2013	Macklemore & Ryan Lewis; The Heist	Calvin Harris; 18 Months	Imagine Dragons; Night Visions	Pink; The Truth About Love	Bruno Mars; Unorthodox Jukebox
2012	David Guetta; Nothing But The Beat	Gotye; Making Mirrors	Drake; Take Care	Lana Del Rey; Born To Die	One Direction; Up All Night

=== Most streamed albums in a single day ===
The following table lists the most streamed albums in a single day, registering the total of obtained streams, the artist, the publication of the album and the date in which these streams were reached.

Rank	Album	Artist(s)	Streams	Tracks	Average	Date published	Date achieved	Ref.
1	The Tortured Poets Department (Note: The streams include those accumulated in the "Anthology" edition.)	Taylor Swift	313,747,178	31	10,120,877	19 April 2024		
2	The Life of a Showgirl	Taylor Swift	249,978,671	12	20,831,556	3 October 2025		
3	Midnights (Note: The streams include those accumulated in the "3am Edition" version.)	Taylor Swift	184,695,609	20	9,234,781	21 October 2022		
4	1989 (Taylor's Version) (Note: The streams include those accumulated in the "Deluxe" version.)	Taylor Swift	176,170,759	22	8,007,754	27 October 2023		
5	Certified Lover Boy	Drake	153,400,000	21	7,306,741	3 September 2021		
6	Nadie Sabe Lo Que Va a Pasar Mañana	Bad Bunny	145,925,845	21 (Note: The streams for Nadie Sabe Lo Que Va a Pasar Mañana that day are the sum of the streams for each song that reached the Global Top 200 chart. The track "Europa :(" did not appear on the chart, leaving the missing information unknown.)	6,948,849	14 October 2023		
7	Un Verano Sin Ti	Bad Bunny	145,811,373	23	6,339,624	6 May 2022		
8	Iceman	Drake	140,231,060	18	7,790,614	15 May 2026		
9	Music	Playboi Carti	134,584,864	30	4,486,162	14 March 2025		
10	Scorpion	Drake	132,384,203	25	5,295,368	29 June 2018		

=== Historical number one most-streamed album in a single day ===
The following table lists the progression by date of number one ranked most-streamed albums in a single day, as registered on the Spotify Global Weekly chart.

Key
#	Indicates most days at number one

Album	Artist(s)	Streams	Date published	Date achieved	Days held	Ref.
The Tortured Poets Department (Note: The streams include those accumulated in the "Anthology" edition.)	Taylor Swift	313,747,178	19 April 2024		945	
Midnights (Note: The streams include those accumulated in the "3am Edition" version.)	Taylor Swift	184,695,609	21 October 2022		547	
Certified Lover Boy	Drake	153,441,565	3 September 2021		414	
Scorpion	Drake	132,384,203	29 June 2018		1163 #	
Beerbongs & Bentleys	Post Malone	77,452,211	27 April 2018		64	
As of 20 November 2026

=== Most streamed albums in a single week ===
The following table lists the most streamed albums in a single week, registering the total of obtained streams, the artist, the publication of the album and the date in which these streams were reached.

Rank	Album	Artist(s)	Streams	Tracks	Average	Date published	Date achieved	Ref.
1	The Tortured Poets Department (Note: The streams include those accumulated in the "Anthology" edition.)	Taylor Swift	1,173,127,225	31	37,842,814	19 April 2024	25 April 2024	
2	The Life of a Showgirl (Note: The streams include those accumulated in the "Track by Track" version.)	Taylor Swift	887,338,234	12	73,944,853	3 October 2025	9 October 2025	
3	Midnights (Note: The streams include those accumulated in the "3am Edition" version.)	Taylor Swift	776,481,256	20	38,824,063	21 October 2022	27 October 2022	
4	Un Verano Sin Ti	Bad Bunny	618,159,971	23	26,876,520	6 May 2022	12 May 2022	
5	Debí Tirar Más Fotos	Bad Bunny	579,245,938	17	34,073,290	5 January 2025	16 January 2025	
6	1989 (Taylor's Version) (Note: The streams include those accumulated in the "Deluxe" version.)	Taylor Swift	572,430,422	22	26,019,565	27 October 2023	2 November 2023	
7	Scorpion	Drake	559,021,928	25	22,360,877	29 June 2018	5 July 2018	
8	Arirang	BTS	525,597,827	14	37,542,702	20 March 2026	26 March 2026	
9	Certified Lover Boy	Drake	497,083,050	21	23,670,621	3 September 2021	9 September 2021	
10	Music	Playboi Carti	490,000,000	30	22,424,719	14 March 2025	20 March 2025	

=== Historical number one most-streamed album in a single week ===
The following table lists the progression by date of number one ranked most-streamed albums in a single week, as registered on the Spotify Global Weekly chart.

Key
#	Indicates most days at number one

Album	Artist(s)	Streams	Date published	Date achieved	Days held	Ref.
The Tortured Poets Department (Note: The streams include those accumulated in the "Anthology" edition.)	Taylor Swift	1,173,127,225	19 April 2024	25 April 2024	939	
Midnights (Note: The streams include those accumulated in the "3am Edition" version.)	Taylor Swift	776,481,256	21 October 2022	27 October 2022	547	
Un Verano Sin Ti	Bad Bunny	618,159,971	6 May 2022	12 May 2022	169	
Scorpion	Drake	559,021,928	29 June 2018	5 July 2018	1408 #	
Beerbongs & Bentleys	Post Malone	409,107,439	27 April 2018	3 May 2018	64	
÷ (Note: The streams include those accumulated in the "Deluxe" version.)	Ed Sheeran	372,008,974	3 March 2017	9 March 2017	421	
As of 20 November 2026

== See also ==
- List of most-streamed artists on Spotify
- List of most-viewed YouTube videos
- List of most-liked YouTube videos
- List of most-disliked YouTube videos
- List of most-subscribed YouTube channels
- List of most-followed Facebook pages
- List of most-liked Instagram posts
- List of most-followed Instagram accounts
- List of most-followed TikTok accounts
- List of most-followed Twitch channels
- List of most-followed Twitter accounts
