= Fermín IV =

Mexican rapper and pastor

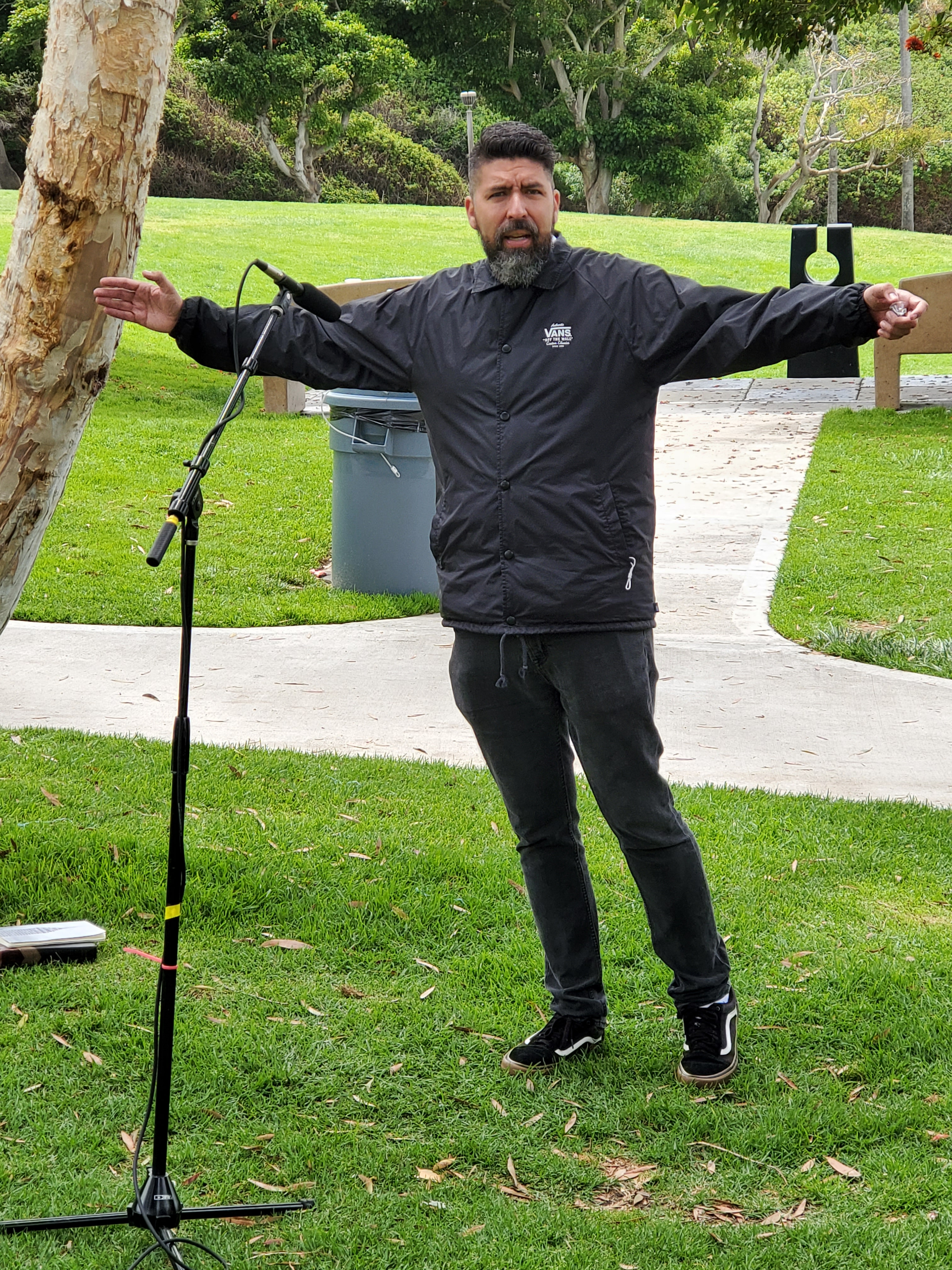

Background information
- Born: Fermín IV Caballero Elizondo; Monterrey, Nuevo León, Mexico
- Genres: Christian hip hop; Mexican hip hop; conscious hip hop
- Occupations: Rapper, pastor
- Years active: 1994–present

Fermín IV Caballero Elizondo (born December 22, 1974) is a Mexican rapper and Evangelical pastor, better known as a former member of the Mexican hip hop group Control Machete.

As part of Control Machete, he obtained in 2000 a Latin Grammy Award nomination for "Sí señor" as "Best Rock Song", a platinum RIAA certification for the album "Mucho Barato", and later as a solo artist, he has been a winner twice in the Arpa Awards of 2003 and 2018 as "Best Urban Album".

== Background ==
Fermín IV was born in Monterrey, Nuevo León and has become a benchmark of Mexican hip hop. He is the primary voice of Control Machete and one of the main characters of the movement of the 90s known as "Avanzada regia".

In the early 1990s he was in a local rock band called Prófuga de Metate.

=== Control Machete ===
In 1996, Toy Selectah formed Control Machete having Fermín IV and Patricio Elizalde together in the group. Being part of this trio, in 1997 they released their first album called Mucho Barato, where "Comprendes Mendes" was very well received. Then came "Artillería Pesada Presenta", an album that included the single "Sí Señor", a track nominated for "Best Rock Song" at the 2000 Latin Grammy Awards.

After his stage with Control Machete, he shared the stage with artists such as U2, Eminem and David Bowie, his extensive tours of America and Europe. Fermín left the group in 2000, his last participation being in the song "De Perros Amores", the soundtrack of the film nominated for the Oscar Awards, Amores perros, to continue his solo career with his album "Boomerang", which contains the theme "004", used in the movie XXx) and won an Arpa Award for "Best Art Design" and "Best Rock or Alternative Album".

=== Ministry ===
In 2001, he became a Protestant Christian and collaborated on some songs of the musical albums of an evangelical church, Semilla de Mostaza, Semilla de Mostaza Presenta, in 2001; Gracias in 2003, the two studio albums; and Concierto En Vivo Desde Monterrey in 2003. He became pastor of the church in 2006. "Gracias" in 2003, both studio albums and "Concierto en Vivo Desde Monterrey" in 2003, a live album.

Later, he would release several productions, the first would be a live album entitled "Fermín IV En Vivo" in 2004, astudio album called "Los que Trastornan al mundo" in 2005 and a various artist album titled "Hip Hop por la vida" and a compilation album called "Dúos Con", both in 2008.

After several years of silence in music, Fermin returned in 2014 with an EP called "Y Mi Vida Comenzó", where the song "No podría estar mejor" was the single from that 4-song album.

In 2017, he signed with the Sony Music label. In August 2017, Fermín IV released his EP entitled "Odio / Amor", with the single "Fácil", which marked his return to the recording studios. With this album, he was once again the winner of a recognition at the Arpa Awards.

In 2018, Fermin was releasing singles with great collaborations "Deseos", "Valentía" with Akil Ammar, being songs for his album "IV", which would be later promoted as "Laberinto", and finally released under the name "Decisiones".

== Discography ==
=== As Control Machete ===
- Mucho Barato... (1996) [Studio album]
- Artillería Pesada Presenta (1999) [Studio album]
- Solo Para Fanáticos (2002) [Compilation album]

=== As soloist ===
- Boomerang (2002) [Studio album]
- Fermín IV En Vivo (2004) [Live album]
- Los Que Trastornan al Mundo (2005) [Studio album]
- Fermin IV Presenta: Están por Alcanzarte / Hip Hop por la Vida (2008) [Various Artist album]
- Dúos Con (2008) [Compilation album]
- Y Mi Vida Comenzó (2014) [EP album]
- Odio/Amor (2017) [EP album]
- Decisiones (2019) [Studio album]
- Ya Puedes Sonreír (2022) [EP]
