= Los Jefes =

- Directed by: Jesús «Chiva» Rodríguez
- Written by: Babo
- Produced by: Mauricio Abud; Gaby Chacón; Stephanie Cortes
- Music by: Cartel de Santa
- Release date: 2015
- Running time: 81 minutes
- Country: Mexico
- Language: Spanish

Los Jefes (transl. The Bosses) is a 2015 drama and crime film directed by Jesús "Chiva" Rodríguez. Starring the Mexican rap group Cartel de Santa, the film explores the influence of drug trafficking among young university students.

The film it was released on July 31, 2015.

== Plot ==
The story follows Poncho, a wealthy student at a prestigious university in Monterrey who finds himself immersed in the difficult and dangerous world of drug trafficking, all because he decides to accompany his friend Greñas to buy marijuana for the first time.

== Cast ==
- Ricardo Arreola as "El Loco" (Crazy Man)
- Babo as "El Perro" (The Dog)
- Millonario as "La Bomba" (The Bomb)
- Emilio Salazar as Greñas
- Fernando Sosa as Poncho
- David Ramírez as Chiquilin
- Daniel Rodríguez as "El Callado" (Silent Man)
- Mauricio Garza as "El Diablo" (The Devil)
- Román Rodríguez as "El Chango"
- Dharius as "El Flaco" (Skinny Man)
- Melanie Pavola as Poncho's Mom
