= Vol. IV (Cartel de Santa album) =

Studio album by Cartel de Santa
- Released: February 20, 2008
- Recorded: 2008
- Studio: Casa Babilonia Studios (Santa Catarina, Nuevo León)
- Genre: Hip hop; Mexican rap; gangsta rap
- Label: Sony BMG; Babilonia Music
- Producer: Rowan Rabia; Mauricio Garza

Cartel de Santa chronology
Volumen ProIIIbido (2006)	Vol. IV (2008)	Sincopa (2010)

Vol. IV is the fourth studio album from Mexican hip hop group Cartel de Santa. It was released on February 20, 2008, by Sony BMG and Babilonia Music. The album has featured guests such as Mery Dee and El Rapero Fracasado.

== Background ==
The album, in Babo's words, was supposed to record in jail but Mexican laws forbade it. Babo and his own record label Babilonia Music recorded the album for free for Sony Music, a lot of fans supports to pay the bail.

== Track listing ==
1. Babo Regresa - contains a sample from "Nada De Tu Amor" by Los Solitarios
2. Cuando Babo Zumba
3. El Cabrón - contains a sample from "Summer Breeze" by The Main Ingredient
4. Filosofía Rítmica
5. Brillo Humillo
6. Puro Cartel Pa' Arriba (ft. Mery Dee)
7. De México El Auténtico
8. Hay Mamita
9. Vato Sencillo
10. Esa Nena Mueve El Culo
11. Por Atrás
12. Siente Los Graves (ft. El Rapero Fracasado)
13. Cosas De La Vida

== Personnel ==
Credits adapted from the liner notes of Vol. IV.

Cartel de Santa

- Babo
- Rowan Rabia
- Dharius

Recording

- Mauricio Garza – beats, production, mixing
- Zayid Garza – mixing assistant
- Ross González – executive producer
- Chris Gehringer – mastering

Artwork

- Jacobo Parra – art director, photography
- Adrián Candia – assistant art director, photography
- RSLND Olivares – wardrobe coordinator

Other

- Gilda Oropeza – A&R coordinator
- Guillermo Gutiérrez – A&R director

== Charts ==
Chart performance for Vol. IV
Chart (2008)	Peak position
Mexican Albums (AMPROFON)	22
