= Sincopa =

Studio album by Cartel de Santa
- Released: May 25, 2010
- Recorded: 2010
- Genre: Hip hop, Mexican rap, gangsta rap
- Label: Sony BMG; Babilonia Music
- Producer: Rowan Rabia; Mauricio Garza

Cartel de Santa chronology
Vol. IV (2008)	Sincopa (2010)	Golpe Avisa (2014)

Singles from Sincopa
- 1. "El Hornazo" Released: April 27, 2010

Sincopa is the fifth studio album from Cartel de Santa. It was released on May 25, 2010, by Sony BMG and Babilonia Music. The album has featured guests such as Mery Dee, Bicho Ramirez and Big Man. The album peaked number 67 on Billboard Latin Albums.

== Track listing ==
1. Bombos y Tarolas
2. Mariconatico
3. Traficando Rimas (ft. Bicho Ramirez)
4. El Hornazo
5. Escucha y Aprende
6. Con El Coco Rapado - contains sample from "Fumemos un Cigarrillo" by Piero
7. Dale Fuego (ft. Big Man)
8. El Mal Necesario - contains sample from "They Don't Know" by Brownout
9. Volar, Volar
10. Mobster Paradise (ft. Mery Dee)
11. Con El Corazon - contains sample from "No Muerdas La Mano" by Kinto Sol
12. El Ratón y El Queso

== Charts ==
Chart performance for Sincopa
Chart (2010)	Peak position
Mexican Albums (AMPROFON)	9
US Latin Rhythm Albums (Billboard)	12
US Top Latin Albums (Billboard)	67

== Certifications ==
Region	Certification	Certified units/sales
Mexico (AMPROFON)	Gold	30,000^{^}
^{^} Shipments figures based on certification alone.
