= Directo Hasta Arriba =

Studio album by Dharius
- Released: December 9, 2014
- Recorded: 2014
- Genre: Hip hop; gangsta rap
- Length: 38:56
- Label: Sony; RCA
- Producer: Mauricio Garza

Dharius chronology
Directo Hasta Arriba (2014)	Mala Fama, Buena Vidha (2018)

Directo Hasta Arriba is the first solo album by Mexican rapper Dharius, after he released 5 albums with Cartel de Santa. It was released on December 9, 2014. The album features guest appearances from Sick Jacken, Billy Kent, Revel Day and Alkhol.

== Track listing ==
1. Estilo Malandro
2. La Raja
3. Internacional
4. Homicidha (ft. Revel Day, Billy Kent & Alkhol)
5. Serenata Rap
6. Lírica Onírica
7. Directo Hasta Arriba
8. Qué Buen Fieston
9. El After Porky
10. La Vidha Loca (ft. Sick Jacken)
11. Por Allá Los Washo
