= Por Mi México =

2020 song by Lefty SM and Santa Fe Klan

- Cover of the remix version

Song by Lefty SM and Santa Fe Klan

from the album Necesidad
- Language: Spanish
- Released: 19 June 2020
- Genre: Latin hip hop
- Length: 3:39; 6:45 (remix)
- Label: Alzada Corp.
- Songwriters: Alan Rodrigo Ledesma Rios; Ángel Jair Quezada Jasso; Antonio de Jesús Olaes Mendez; Eduardo Alejandro Median Guitérrez; Jesús Daniel Cruz Mora; Juan Carlos Sauceda Vazquez

Visualizer
- "Por Mi México" on YouTube

"Por Mi México" (transl. "For My Mexico") is a song by Mexican rappers Lefty SM and Santa Fe Klan. It was released on 19 June 2020, through Alzada Corp., as part of their collaborative album Necesidad (2020). A remix version of the song, which features fellow rappers Dharius, C-Kan, MC Davo and Neto Peña, was released on 25 August 2023. A Latin hip hop song, in which it is a message of national pride, it attained virality in 2022, with a further increase in streams on the remix version after Lefty SM's death. It peaked at numbers 29 and 16 on the US Hot Latin Songs and Mexico Songs charts, respectively, with it later attaining a diamond certification in Mexico.

== Background and release ==
Lefty SM released his collaborative album with Santa Fe Klan titled Necesidad in 2020. While working on the album, both rappers thought it was missing one more track, with the former eventually adding "Por Mi México" while removing his second verse from it for the latter. It later attained virality through TikTok, while its visualizer also attained over 100 million views on YouTube. The former recalled that the song did not have an official video, with both rappers deciding to instead release a remix version of the song, which contains additional verses from Dharius, C-Kan, MC Davo and Neto Peña, along with its accompanying music video. It was eventually released as a single on 25 August 2023.

== Music and lyrics ==
Referred to as the "second national anthem of Mexico", "Por Mi México" is a Latin hip hop song. With the lyric "soy mexicano esa es mi bandera, la levanto donde quiera, verde, blanca, roja hasta morir" (transl. "I am Mexican, that is my flag, I raise it wherever I want, green, white, red until I die", the song is a message of national pride, urging a person to stay connected to their home country.

== Reception and legacy ==
Days after the song's remix was released, Lefty SM was shot dead at the age of 31. After his death, the remix version of "Por Mi México" debuted at number 44 on the US Hot Latin Songs chart with 1.4 million streams, on the issue dated 16 September 2023, becoming his first song to enter a Billboard chart. It reached a peak of number 29 on the chart, on the issue dated 30 September 2023. On the US Latin Digital Song Sales chart, it reached at a peak of number seven on the same issue date, with the original version re-entering the chart at number 23. A year later, both versions re-entered the chart at numbers 12 and 15 on the issue dated 28 September 2024.

In Mexico, the remix version reached a peak of number 16 on the Mexico Songs chart, while the original version received a diamond certification by the Asociación Mexicana de Productores de Fonogramas y Videogramas on 19 September 2024, for selling 300,000 certified units in Mexico.

== Charts ==
Chart performance for "Por Mi México" (remix)
Chart (2023)	Peak position
Mexico (Billboard)	16
US Hot Latin Songs (Billboard)	29

== Certifications ==
Certifications for "Por Mi México"
Region	Certification	Certified units/sales
Mexico (AMPROFON)	Diamond	300,000^{‡}
United States (RIAA)	Diamond (Latin)	600,000^{‡}
^{‡} Sales+streaming figures based on certification alone.
