= Mala Fama, Buena Vidha =

Studio album by Dharius
- Released: June 22, 2018
- Recorded: 2009–18
- Genre: Hip hop; R&B
- Label: Sony Music
- Producer: Mauricio Garza

Dharius chronology
Directo Hasta Arriba (2014)	Mala Fama, Buena Vidha (2018)

Singles from Mala Fama, Buena Vidha
- 1. "Me Voy A Poner Bien Loco" Released: April 22, 2017; 2. "Hey Morra" Released: October 1, 2017; 3. "Mala Vibra" Released: October 11, 2016; 4. "La Durango" Released: September 1, 2016

Mala Fama, Buena Vidha is the second album by Dharius, released on June 22, 2018. It was produced by Mauricio Garza.

== Track listing ==
1. Mala Fama, Buena Vidha
2. Te Gustan Los Malos
3. Mala Vibra
4. Hey Morra
5. Es El Pinche Dharius
6. La Durango
7. Me Voy A Poner Bien Loco
8. Allá Por Cd. Juarez
9. Ando Bien Amanecido
10. Un Camión Lleno de Puras de Esas
11. De Party Sin Ti
12. Perro Loco
