= Cumbia rap =

Music genre

Cumbia rap is a spin-off of the original cumbia genre. It consists of a more traditional Colombian rhythm, as well as some hip hop and reggae type additions. Pioneers of cumbia rap include Crooked Stilo from Los Angeles (salvadorian origins) in 2003, El Gran Silencio, Control Machete, Pato Machete and Cartel de Santa from Nuevo León in the late 90s and early 2000s, Santa Fe Klan from Guanajuato, Chicos de Barrio from Coahuila, as well as the Kumbia Kings from Texas.

Early Tex-Mex or Onda Chicana acts such as La Mafia, La Sombra, and Selena y Los Dinos experimented with rap lyrics over cumbia beats in the late 1980s and early 1990s.
