= Golpe Avisa =

Studio album by Cartel de Santa
- Released: 5 August 2014
- Genre: Hip hop; trap; reggae; R&B
- Length: 44:10
- Language: Spanish
- Label: Sony Music; Babilonia Music
- Producer: Rowan Rabia

Cartel de Santa chronology
Sincopa (2010)	Golpe Avisa (2014)	Viejo Marihuano (2016)

Golpe Avisa is the sixth studio album by Mexican hip hop group Cartel de Santa. It was released on 5 August 2014, through Sony Music and Babilonia Music. The album contains guests appearances by Campa, Draw and Big Man. It debuted at number four on the US Top Latin Albums chart, with 2,000 units sold within its first week of release, making it their second entry on the chart after Sincopa peaked at number 67.

== Track listing ==
1. Andamos Zumbando
2. Si Te Vienen a Contar
3. Suena Mamalona (featuring Campa) – contains sample from "Cumbia De Las Estrellas" by Super Grupo Colombia
4. Es de Ley (featuring Draw)
5. Escucha y Aprende
6. Bullyar
7. Los Mensajes del WhatsApp – contains sample from "Groovy Situation" by Keith Rowe
8. Doctor Marihuano (featuring Big Man)
9. Me Alegro de Su Odio
10. Wacha, Están Mamando Riata
11. A Ti Te Da Besitos – contains sample from "Short Dick Man" by 20 Fingers & Gillette
12. Para Cada Loco
13. Lo Que Quiero Es Besarte

== Charts ==
Chart performance for Golpe Avisa
Chart (2014)	Peak position
Mexican Albums (AMPROFON)	5
US Latin Rhythm Albums (Billboard)	1
US Top Latin Albums (Billboard)	4
US Top Rap Albums (Billboard)	16

== Certifications ==
Region	Certification	Certified units/sales
Mexico (AMPROFON)	2× Platinum+Gold	150,000^{‡}
^{‡} Sales+streaming figures based on certification alone.
