= Viejo Marihuano =

Studio album by Cartel de Santa
- Released: 3 October 2016
- Genre: Hip hop, Mexican rap, trap, mumble rap, R&B
- Length: 44:05
- Label: Sony Music; Babilonia Music
- Producer: Rowan Rabia

Cartel de Santa chronology
Golpe Avisa (2014)	Viejo Marihuano (2016)

Singles from Viejo Marihuano
- 1. "Mucha Marihuana" Released: 16 October 2016

Viejo Marihuano is the seventh studio album from Mexican hip hop group Cartel de Santa. It was released on 3 October 2016, by Sony Music and Babilonia Music. The album contains collaborations with Millonario, Santa Estilo and Bicho Ramirez.

"Mucha Marihuana" was released as the lead single for the album, on 16 October 2016.

== Track listing ==
No.	Title	Length
1.	"Volvió El Sensei"	3:24
2.	"Leve"	3:45
3.	"Bailar y Volar" (with Millonario)	4:16
4.	"Desde Cuando"	3:35
5.	"Clika Nostra" (with Santa Estilo)	3:36
6.	"Mucha Marihuana"	3:48
7.	"Culón Culito"	3:43
8.	"El Loco Mas Loco"	4:02
9.	"Si Estuviera En Dubai"	3:21
10.	"Somos Chidos" (with Bicho Ramirez)	3:31
11.	"Soy Quien Soy"	3:33
Total length:		44:05

== Charts ==
Chart performance for Viejo Marihuano
Chart (2016)	Peak position
Mexican Albums (AMPROFON)	12
US Latin Rhythm Albums (Billboard)	1
US Top Latin Albums (Billboard)	2
US Top Rap Albums (Billboard)	18
