= Cartel de Santa (album) =

2002 debut studio album by Cartel de Santa

Studio album by Cartel de Santa
- Released: 2003
- Recorded: 2002–2003
- Genres: Mexican rap, gangsta rap, rap metal, rap rock
- Label: Sony BMG
- Producers: Jason Roberts; Mauricio Garza

Cartel de Santa chronology
| Cartel de Santa (2003) | Vol. II (2004) |

Cartel de Santa is the debut studio album from Mexican hip hop group Cartel de Santa. It was released in 2003 by Sony BMG. The album is mixed up by various element sounds such as funk, rock and heavy metal.

== Track listing ==
1. Intro
2. Todas Mueren Por Mí
3. Asesinos de Asesinos - contains sample from "1, 2 Pass It" by D&D AllStars
4. Cannabis
5. Jake Mate (ft. Sick Jacken)
6. Rima 1
7. Burreros
8. Perros
9. Quinto Elemento
10. Rima 2
11. NTN
12. La Pelotona
13. Rima 3
14. Super MC's (ft. Real Academia de La Rima)
15. En Mi Ciudad
16. Para Aquí o Para Llevar
17. Chinga Los Racistas (ft. Tavo Limongi)
18. Rima 4
19. Factor Miedo
20. Intenta Rimar (instrumental)
