= Volumen ProIIIbido =

Studio album by Cartel de Santa
- Released: March 20, 2006
- Recorded: 2006
- Genre: Hip hop, Mexican Rap, Gangsta Rap
- Label: Sony BMG; Babilonia Music
- Producer: Rowan Rabia; Mauricio Garza

Cartel de Santa chronology
Vol. II (2004)	Volumen ProIIIbido (2006)	Vol. IV (2008)

Volumen ProIIIbido (also known as Volumen Prohibido) is the third studio album from Mexican hip hop group Cartel de Santa. It was released on March 20, 2006 by Sony BMG and Babilonia Music. The album has featured guests such as Sinful El Pecador, Mr. Pomel and Mery Dee.

== Track listing ==
1. Mira Quien Vuelva Al 100
2. Cheka Wey (ft. Mery Dee)
3. La Ranfla del Cartel
4. Déjate Caer (ft. Mr. Pomel)
5. Hey Si Me Ven
6. México Lindo y Bandido
7. 2 Mujeres En Mi Cama
8. Si Son Bien Jotos (ft. Mr. Pomel)
9. Yo Me La Perez Prado
10. Conexión Vieja Escuela (ft. Sinful El Pecador)
11. Subele a La Greibol
12. Ahora Si Voy A Lokear
