= Santa Fe Klan =

Mexican rapper and singer-songwriter

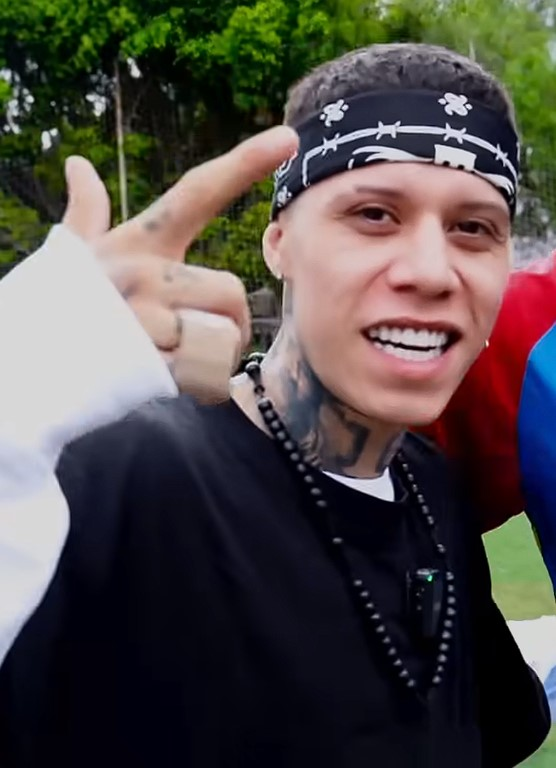
- Santa Fe Klan in 2023

Background information
- Born: Ángel Jair Quezada Jasso; 29 November 1999 (age 26); Guanajuato City, Guanajuato, Mexico
- Genres: Hip hop; cumbia; cumbia rap; regional Mexican; reggaeton; Latin trap
- Occupations: Rapper; singer; songwriter
- Years active: 2016–present

Ángel Jair Quezada Jasso, known professionally as Santa Fe Klan, is a Mexican rapper and singer-songwriter. He featured on several songs which were highly certified by AMPROFON in Mexico, including 4× Platinum for "Por Mi México" by Lefty SM and 3× Platinum for "El Catrín" by Gera MX. He was ranked 31st on the Rolling Stone magazine's list of the "50 greatest rappers in the history of Spanish rap," published in 2024.

== Early life ==
Ángel Jair Quezada Jasso was born in the Santa Fe colonia in Guanajuato, State of Guanajuato, Mexico, the origin of his stage name. Quezada grew up breakdancing and spraying graffiti on walls in his city. He learned to record his own songs at age 13, and by 14 years old, he had his own studio.

== Career ==
He later moved to Guadalajara to pursue his artistic career, where he joined Alzada Récords, a group dedicated to promoting Mexican hip-hop. He recorded his first productions with the group, and later left in 2020.

In April 2021, he released the single Grandes Ligas, in collaboration with Snoop Dogg and Lupillo Rivera. In August 2021, he released a collaboration with Calibre 50 and Beto Sierra named Cuidando el territorio, which reached millions of plays in a few days.

During the COVID-19 pandemic, he started playing a Colombian accordion and focused his music on cumbia, a genre he heard as a child from his parents and the sonideros in his neighbourhood. In this period, he released the album Santa Cumbia, produced by Toy Selectah and Camilo Lara of the Mexican Institute of Sound. The album was reportedly recorded in one week. During this period, he also released the single "Ultimate", in collaboration with Steve Aoki and featuring Snow Tha Product. On 24 April 2025, Santa Fe Klan collaborated with Emmanuel Cortes on the remix of the latter's song "Amor".

== Discography ==
- Por Costumbre (2017)
- Seguimos Radicando (2017)
- El Inicio Vol. 1, 2, and 3 (2017)
- Bendecido (2019)
- Necesidad (2020)
- Santa Cumbia (2021)
- Mundo (2022)
- Todo (2023)
- Blanco y Negro (2024)

== Awards ==
- Independent Song Award by the Society of Authors and Composers of Mexico, 2021
