= Kinto Sol =

American hip hop group

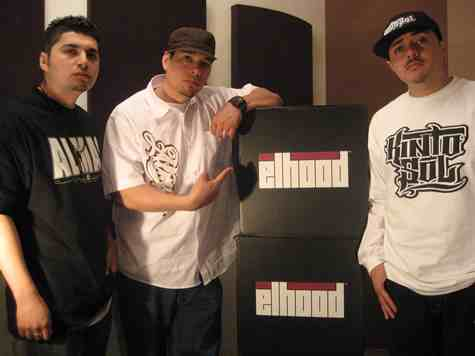
- From left to right - DJ Payback, Skribe and El Chivo

Background information
- Origin: Iramuco, Guanajuato, Mexico
- Genres: Hip hop; Conscious rap; Gangsta rap; Trap
- Years active: 1990-present
- Labels: Virus Enterprises, Disa, Univision
- Members: DJ Payback Garcia; El Chivo; Skribe
- Past members: El Gordo; El Malo
- Website: kintosol.com

Kinto Sol is a Mexican hip hop group based in Milwaukee, Wisconsin. The group consists of three brothers: DJ Payback Garcia (Javier Garcia), El Chivo (Eduardo Garcia) and Skribe (Manuel Garcia); originally from Iramuco, Guanajuato, Mexico, they moved to the US at a very young age due to financial struggle. Initially, they would rap in English, but after their first self-titled album they began rapping mainly in Spanish. The group would blend traditional Mexican music with hip hop style beats, giving them their unique sound. They own their own independent record label, Virus Enterprises LLC, which specializes in Latin hip hop. The group's name is a phonetic spelling of "quinto sol" (fifth sun), and is taken from an Aztec legend in which the Fifth Sun will be the last one to set in this lifetime.

Los Hijos Del Maiz was awarded the best Latin Hip Hop album of the year for its content and best sales history. El Chivo has also released two independent solo albums. His latest album, Cicatrices reached number 5 on the Latin Billboard charts "Latin Rhythm Album" and it was an independent release with no backing of a major record label.

El Ultimo Suspiro [The Last Breath] is the sixth studio album by Kinto Sol released on October 19, 2010 on Machete Music. The album debuted #1 in the Latin Billboard Charts Latin Rhythm.

== Beginnings ==
Kinto Sol began when three brothers, “Skribe”, “DJ Payback Garcia” and “El Chivo,” set out to pursue their passion in music. Skribe, the executive producerus Enterprises, moved from Mexico to Chicago then to Milwaukee. DJ Payback Garcia & El Chivo moved from Mexico to Milwaukee, DJ Payback at age 14 and El Chivo at 7. Skribe began his musical career as a DJ in 1990.

== Discography ==
=== Albums ===
- Kinto Sol (1999, Virus Enterprises LLC)
- Del Norte Al Sur (2001, Disa)
- Hecho En Mexico (2003, Disa)
- La Sangre Nunca Muere (2005, Disa)
- Los Hijos del Maiz (2007, Univision)
- 15 Rayos (2007, Univision)
- Carcel de Sueños (2009, Machete Music)
- El Último Suspiro (2010, Machete Music)
- Familia, Fe y Patria (2012, Sony Music Latin)
- La Tumba del Alma (2013, Virus Enterprises LLC)
- Protegiendo el Penacho (2015, Virus Enterprises LLC)
- Lo Ke No Se Olvida (2016, Virus Enterprises LLC)
- Somos Once (2017, Virus Enterprises LLC)
- Lengua Universal (2018, Virus Enterprises LLC)
- Oxlajuj (2020, Virus Enterprises LLC)
- La Flecha (2022, Virus Enterprises LLC)
- La Esquina (2024, Virus Enterprises LLC)

=== Compilation appearances ===
- The Shield: Music from the Streets (2005, Lakeshore) (song: "No Muerdas la Mano")

== Charts ==
Album	Chart	Peak Position
Los Hijos del Maiz	U.S. Billboard Latin Rhythm Albums	6
Los Hijos del Maiz	U.S. Billboard Top Heatseekers	10
Los Hijos del Maiz	U.S. Billboard Top Latin Albums	30
Encuentros Musicales	U.S. Billboard Latin Rhythm Albums	6
Encuentros Musicales	U.S. Billboard Top Latin Albums	19
15 Rayos	U.S. Billboard Latin Rhythm Albums	6
15 Rayos	U.S. Billboard Top Heatseekers	43
15 Rayos	U.S. Billboard Top Latin Albums	40
