= Pato Machete =

Mexican rapper and singer (born 1975)

- Born: Raúl Chapa Elizalde; 6 October 1975 (age 51); Monterrey, Nuevo León, Mexico
- Genres: Hip-hop; rap rock; cumbia; cumbia rap; pop rap; alternative rap; rap metal; nu metal; rock
- Occupations: Rapper; singer
- Years active: 1993–present
- Labels: Universal; Polygram; La Tuna Records
- Formerly of: Control Machete; Resorte
- Website: patomachete.com

Raúl Chapa Elizalde (6 October 1975) is a Mexican rapper and singer better known by his stage name Pato Machete. He was part of the Mexican hip hop group Control Machete and for a brief time in the nu metal/rap metal band Resorte.

== Discography ==
- Mucho Barato... (1996)
- Artillería Pesada presenta (1999)
- Sólo Para Fanáticos (2002)
- Uno, Dos: Bandera (2003)
- Contrabanda (2008)
- 33 (2012)
- Rifa! (2016)
