= Control Machete =

Mexican hip-hop band

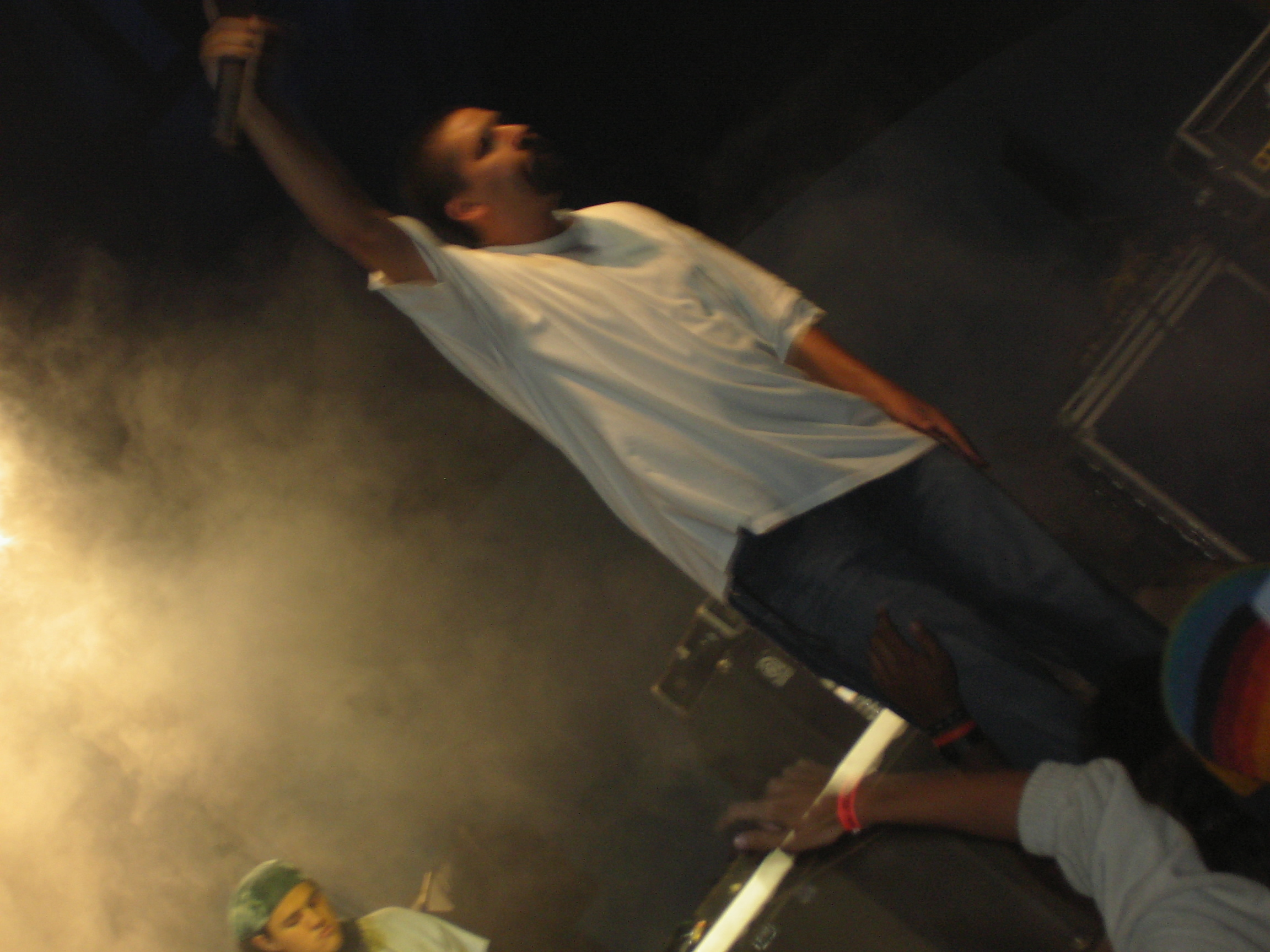
- Concert photo of Fermin IV in 2005

Background information
- Origin: Monterrey, Mexico
- Genres: Hip-hop; hardcore hip-hop; nu metal; rap metal; rap rock; cumbia; cumbia rap
- Years active: 1996–present; (on hiatus since 2004)
- Label: Universal Latino
- Members: Patricio "Pato Machete" Chapa Elizalde; Antonio "Toy" Hernández
- Past members: Fermín IV

Control Machete is a Mexican hip-hop group from Monterrey, Nuevo León. Its members are Fermín IV (listed as Fermin IV Caballero Elizondo in credits), Patricio "Pato Machete" Chapa Elizalde, and Toy Kenobi (Antonio "Toy" Hernández).

== History ==
Formed in 1996 in Monterrey, Control Machete became the commercial face of the Avanzada Regia musical movement. Their debut album, Mucho Barato (1996), is considered a seminal work in Spanish-language hip-hop, selling over 100,000 copies in Mexico within its first weeks and eventually exceeding 500,000 units across Latin America.

The lead single, "¿Comprendes Mendes?", gained massive airplay on MTV Latin America, earning the group a nomination for a MTV Video Music Award for International Viewer's Choice in 1997. Following the success of their first album, the group collaborated with diverse artists including Cypress Hill and Los Fabulosos Cadillacs. Their second album, Artilleria Pesada, Presenta... (1999), further solidified their international presence and was nominated for Best Urban Music Album at the 1st Annual Latin Grammy Awards in 2000.

The group moved to the mainstream after their song "Sí Señor" was used as backing in the Levi's Super Bowl television commercial "Crazy Legs". However, their debut album was already a bestseller, with 100,000 units sold in Mexico and 400,000 in all of Latin America. In 1998, Control Machete covered the song "Amnesia" included in the album Volcán: Tributo a José José, a tribute to Mexican legend José José.

Fermin IV left Control Machete in 2002 and released a solo album, Boomerang. He also collaborated with Cypress Hill on the track "Siempre Peligroso" on their album Los grandes éxitos en español.

Control Machete's track "Danzón" was recorded in Cuba with Buena Vista Social Club's Rubén González. The songs "Sí señor", "De Perros Amores" and "Pesada" were included in the Alejandro González Iñárritu film Amores perros and its soundtrack. The band's music was also heard in the 2005 film Land of the Dead ("En El Camino"), as well as the 2006 film Crank ("Bandera") starring Jason Statham. "Humanos Mexicanos" played in an episode from the fifth season of the FX series Sons of Anarchy. "Sí señor" was also briefly heard in the 2019 film Terminator: Dark Fate.

The group's music has appeared in several video games, including Total Overdose, Crackdown, and Scarface: The World Is Yours.

Their 2003 album reached No. 18 on the Latin Pop charts.

The group has been on an indefinite hiatus since 2004. Pato and DJ Toy have collaborated with other artists and released their own solo albums. They have stated since that while they have no concrete plans to reunite, they don't discard the possibility if and when it feels right.

== Discography ==
- Mucho Barato (1997)
- Artillería Pesada Presenta (1999)
- Solo Para Fanáticos (2002) (greatest hits)
- Uno, Dos: Bandera (2004)
- Eat, Breath, and Sleep (2006) (greatest hits)
- Singles (2017)

== See also ==
- Avanzada Regia
