= Shorty Party =

Single by Cartel de Santa featuring La Kelly
- Language: Spanish
- Released: 4 March 2023
- Genre: Latin hip hop
- Length: 4:25
- Songwriter: Eduardo Davalos De Luna
- Producers: Davalos De Luna; Román Rodríguez

Cartel de Santa singles chronology
| "Piensa en Mi" (2023) | "Shorty Party" (2023) | "Pablito y el Pelon" (2023) |

Music video
- "Shorty Party" on YouTube

"Shorty Party" is a song performed by Mexican hip hop group Cartel de Santa, featuring OnlyFans influencer La Kelly. It was released as a single on 4 March 2023, through Babilonia Music. The song was written and produced by Eduardo "Babo" Davalos De Luna, lead vocalist of the group. The song was also produced by Román Rodríguez.

== Chart performance ==
"Shorty Party" peaked at number 25 in the Billboard Global 200 and number 15 in the Hot Latin Songs chart. In the week of 25 March 2023, the song also peaked at number 2 on the Mexico Songs chart, only behind "TQG" by Karol G and Shakira and in the week of 1 April 2023, behind "Ella Baila Sola" by Eslabon Armado and Peso Pluma.

== Music video ==
A music video was released on the same day of the song's release, on Cartel de Santa's official YouTube channel. It was directed by Davila Films. The video would be the number 1 trending YouTube music video in Mexico and Guatemala, while it was the number two trending YouTube music video in the United States, Bolivia, and Honduras. The video had also been trending in Costa Rica, Ecuador, Nicaragua, Colombia, and Canada.

== Charts ==
=== Weekly charts ===
Weekly chart performance for "Shorty Party"
| Chart (2023) | Peak position |
|---|---|
| Global 200 (Billboard) | 25 |
| Mexico (Billboard) | 2 |
| US Bubbling Under Hot 100 Singles (Billboard) | 8 |
| US Hot Latin Songs (Billboard) | 15 |

=== Year-end charts ===
Year-end chart performance for "Shorty Party"
| Chart (2023) | Position |
|---|---|
| US Hot Latin Songs (Billboard) | 74 |
