= Cartel de Santa =

Mexican rap group

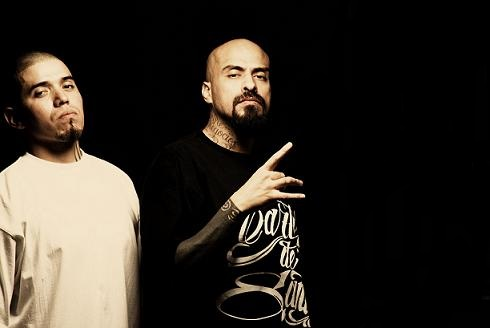

Background information
- Origin: Santa Catarina, Nuevo León, Mexico
- Genre: Latin hip hop
- Years active: 1996–present
- Labels: Babilonia Music, Sony Music
- Members: Babo; Rowan Rabia (Mono)
- Past members: Dharius
- Website: Official site

Cartel de Santa is a Mexican hip hop group from Santa Catarina, Nuevo León, Mexico, founded by Eduardo Dávalos de Luna (Babo) and Roman Leonardo Rodríguez Lopez (Mono). The band started playing in 1996 as part of the Avanzada Regia musical movement and Artilleria Pesada. Currently composed by Eduardo Davalos de Luna, also known as MC Babo or Babo (lead vocals), Rowan Rabia (beatmaker) and DJ Agustín (only in live shows). They have been referred to as one of the most notable Mexican hip-hop groups.

== History ==
=== 1996–2003: Beginnings and self-titled debut album ===
Cartel de Santa started playing in 1996, when MC Babo and some friends began singing improvised rap songs.

The group became famous in 2003, when the band released their debut self-titled album. The album includes hits such as "Perros", "Todas Mueren por Mí" and "La Pelotona". The album was produced by Jason Roberts who had previously worked with artists such as Cypress Hill, Ice Cube, House of Pain, Guns N' Roses, Control Machete, and Plastilina Mosh. This contributed to the fame of the band.

That same year, the group released a video clip of the song "Perros". This video was broadcast across Latin America on MTV.

=== 2004–2007: Vol. II and Volumen ProIIIbido ===
A year later, in 2004, a new album was released, Vol. 2, which included hits as "Blah, blah, blah", "La Llamada" and "El Arte del Engaño". Cartel de Santa Vol. 2 counted with the collaboration of other artists, such as Tego Calderón, in "Conexión Puerto Rico", and Mr. Pomel, in "Crónica Babilonia".

In 2007, Cartel de Santa recorded its third album, named Volumen ProIIIbido. It included the single "Cheka Wey" featuring female hip-hop artist Mery Dee.

=== 2008–2013: Vol. IV and Sincopa ===
In February 2008, the band released its fourth album, Vol. IV. The album was meant as a message to fans that "el Cartel" would keep making music. The first single of this album was "Hay mamita" which also has a music videoclip.

In March 2010, Babo announced on the band's Myspace the release of another album. The fifth album was released in May 2010 with the name Vol. V: Sincopa. Like their last work, Volume V showed a better sound and beats quality. Cartel de Santa was nominated for the Latin Grammys as a result of their new release.

=== 2014–present: Golpe Avisa and Viejo Marihuano ===
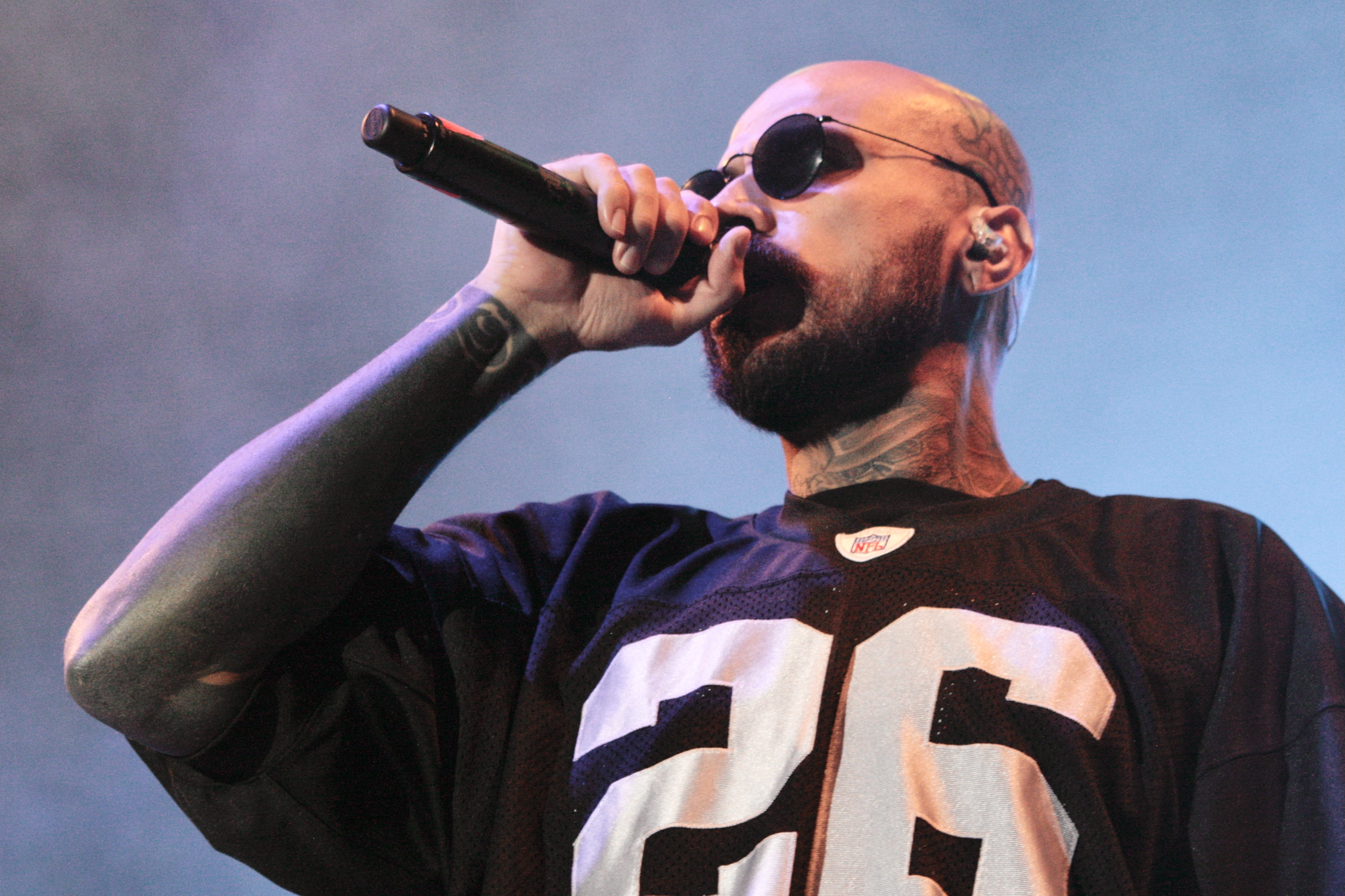
Lead vocalist Babo performing in 2013

The group's sixth album, Golpe Avisa was released on August 5, 2014, by Sony Music Entertainment. This work is the group's first studio album released after the departure of rapper MC Dharius. The album features collaborations with Campa, Da Fucking Draw, Big Man and Millonario. The song "Me alegro de su odio" had originally been released with vocal work from then group member Dharius in June 2013. However, after the rapper's decision to leave the group, this subject had to be re-recorded to include it in the album. This reissued theme was never released as a single.

On 3 October 2016, Cartel de Santa released their seventh album Viejo Marihuano, with the singles "Mucha Marihuana" and "Soy Quien soy". It was published by Babilonia Music, S.A. De C.V. In 2017, the group received a gold record in Mexico for reaching 100,000 sales of the album.

== Controversy ==
In May 2018, nude photographs of MC Babo were published on the internet.

== Discography ==
=== Studio albums ===
List of studio albums, with selected details, chart positions and certifications
| Title | Details | Peak chart positions | | | Certifications |
| Title | Details | MEX | US Latin | US Rap | Certifications |
|---|---|---|---|---|---|
| Cartel de Santa | Released: 2003; Label: Sony BMG | — | — | — | |
| Vol. II | Released: December 7, 2004; Label: Sony BMG, Babilonia | — | — | — | |
| Volumen ProIIIbido | Released: March 20, 2006; Label: Sony BMG, Babilonia | — | — | — | |
| Vol. IV | Released: February 20, 2008; Label: Sony BMG, Babilonia | 22 | — | — | |
| Sincopa | Released: May 25, 2010; Label: Sony BMG, Babilonia | 9 | 67 | — | AMPROFON: Gold |
| Golpe Avisa | Released: August 5, 2014; Label: Babilonia, Sony Music | 5 | 4 | 16 | AMPROFON: 2× Platinum+Gold |
| Viejo Marihuano | Released: November 18, 2016; Label: Babilonia, Sony Music | 12 | 2 | 18 | AMPROFON: Platinum |

=== Compilation albums ===
- Cartel de Santa, Casa Babilonia presentan: Los Mixtapes (2006)
- Cartel de Santa, Greatest Hits (2007)
- Casa Babilonia Records: Compilado (2008)
- Casa Rifa: Demos (2009)
- Sincopa 5.1 (2011)
- Golpe Avisa (2014)
- Viejo Marihuano (2016)

=== Soundtrack albums ===
- Los Jefes (Banda Sonora de la Película) (2015)

=== Live albums ===
- Me Atizo Macizo Tour (En Vivo) (2012)

=== Singles ===
- "Pollo y Conejo" (2018)
- "Burbujas de Cristal" (2019) (with Millonario)
- "Vaya Vaya" (2020)
- "TUY" (2021) (with Alemán, Millonario, and Adán Cruz)
- "Piensa en Mi" (2023)
- "Shorty Party" (2023) (with La Kelly)
- "Pablito y el Pelon" (2023) (with Pablito Calavera)
