= Toy Selectah =

Mexican DJ and producer

- Occupations: Disc jockey, record producer and musician

Antonio Hernández, better known as Toy Selectah, is a Mexican musician. He began his career as a member of the group Control Machete and has collaborated with artists such as MIA, Cypress Hill, Santa Fe Klan, Thievery Corporation, Café Tacuba, Manu Chao and Celso Piña, among many others.

== Musical career ==
Originally known as "Toy" or "DJ Toy" as a member of Control Machete, he adopted the stage name Toy Selectah in 2008. Under this name, he has collaborated with other artists in both the production and arranging of songs, as well as performing original music and live remixes. His style encompasses the fusion of a wide variety of Latin American subgenres such as Mexican cumbia with hip hop and electronic music.

He was the artistic director of the sub-label Machete Music of Universal Music Group, which influenced the worldwide distribution of reggaeton and is the owner of the Sones del Mexside label. He founded the project Compass with Camilo Lara of the Mexican Institute of Sound.

In 2025, Toy Selectah was announced as one of the remixers for the 2026 FIFA World Cup theme, representing the Monterrey area.

== Discography ==
=== In collaboration ===
- Compass (2016)

== Collaborations ==
- 2001 – "Cumbia sobre el río" by Celso Piña (producer)
