= Dharius =

Mexican rapper

- Born: Alán Alejandro Maldonado Tamez; Monterrey, Nuevo León, Mexico
- Genres: Latin hip hop; gangsta rap
- Occupations: Rapper; actor; singer; songwriter
- Years active: 1996-present
- Labels: Sony BMG; RCA Records; El Clan Records

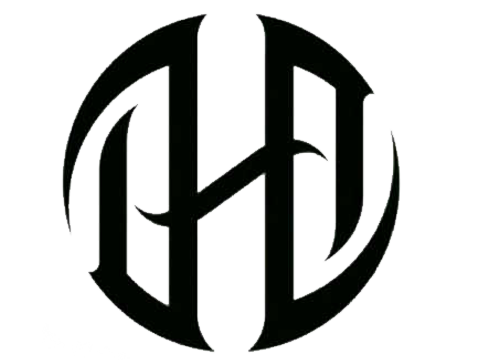
Dharius’ logo

Alán Alejandro Maldonado Tamez is a Mexican rapper, actor, singer and songwriter better known by his stage name Dharius (previously MC Dharius). He is known for having formed part of the Hip Hop Cartel de Santa group from 1999 to 2013. The video and song "Me Alegro de Su Odio" was the last composition he made with Cartel de Santa.

== Discography ==
- Directo Hasta Arriba (2014)
- Mala Fama, Buena Vidha (2018)
- Cuando Todo Acaba (2022)
