= Mexican hip-hop =

Form of dance and music in Mexico

Mexican hip-hop is a form of hip-hop music from Mexico, performed by Mexican artists and artists of Mexican descent. The growth of hip-hop as a genre has led to various adaptations of it depending on a region and language.

Mexican hip-hop is different from Chicano rap. Mexican rap always has a gangster image since the 1990s (not all rappers) but their life styles are completely different from Chicanos reality. In México they do not have gang life in the 1990s. Mexican rap it's considered as heavy influenced by American gangsta rappers N.W.A., Snoop Dogg, Bone Thugs-n-Harmony, Ice Cube, 2Pac & Notorious B.I.G since their mainstream success at the time and Chicano rap which many Mexicans were identified the most since they have Mexican roots or Hispanic in general, most rappers are influenced by Cypress Hill, Kid Frost, Delinquent Habits & Tha Mexakinz which many rappers started to imitate till the present.

Mexican rap are not only rap malandro rappers (gangsta rappers). It includes all types of rap styles such as conscious rap, hardcore rap, rapcore, G-funk, R&B, trap, boom bap, political hip-hop, lo-fi, pop rap, cumbia rap, banda rap, narco rap, regional urbano, alternative hip-hop and many other variations. Chicano rap is mostly gangsta rap and G-funk.

== History ==
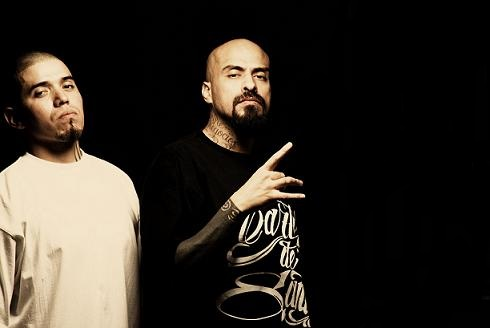
Image of Mexican Hip-hop group Cartel De Santa.

The first Mexican rap record started since 1979 by the comedian Guillermo Ríos aka Memo Ríos under his stage name MC Aplausos rapping Sugarhill Gang "Rappers Delight" instrumental on his adaptations "El Cotorreo". Memo Ríos was not expect that many years later Mexicans started to rap and had success, it was a coincidence and a mistake he stated himself on a video in 2023 talking about his story on how it become the first Mexican rap song in history.

The background of the first Mexican rap song started by what he does in his comedian shows by having topics like the daily life in México, Mexican's attitude, Mexican pop culture and celebrities with their slangs and sense of humor, there was no inspiration on the hip-hop culture or any other kind.

Memo's friend Elias Cervantes was a director of the radio station Radio Variedades along with Cervantes friends had great relationships with the radio stations, borrows the Rappers Delight record to Memo.

Why don't you put lyrics to it Memo, you rhyme, that genre is called rap, it's what you've been doing since 1972 and 1975.

Memo was thinking too much to make his Spanish Rappers Delight version, he took three days to write his lyrics, he went to record his song on the studio Orbimex which was a small record studio that made it possible to record the first Mexican rap song ever made.

After he recorded his first rap song, Memo continued to record more rap parody songs such as "Pedro Infante Murió", "Muy Delgada" (Vanilla Ice: Ice, Ice Baby parody), "Memotronic" (Technotronic: This Beat is Technotronic parody), "Cosa Loca" (The Troggs: Wild Thing parody) and "Mi Bella Genio" (Dimples D: Sucker DJ (A Witch For Love) parody) in the early 1990s.

After 33 years of Mexican Hip-Hop, in 2023 Spotify started to make a mural based on their playlist "50 Años de Hip-Hop Mexicano" in Mexico City that locates on Avenida Chapultepec 68 street on the Doctores neighborhood for celebrating 50 Years of Hip-Hop, curated by Toy Selectah by selecting the best hits from old school rap thru the new school rap. Memo Ríos appears on the mural that is the only one that doesn't have his music catalog on Spotify along with Control Machete, Cartel de Santa, Akwid, Alemán, Gera MX, Santa Fe Klan, MC Davo, Snow Tha Product, Aczino, Lefty SM & among others.

The hip-hop movement started since 1991 by groups as Sindicato del Terror (SDT) & 4to Del Tren both from State of Mexico, in 1996 is the beginning of reached with the emergence of the group from Monterrey, Nuevo León, Control Machete were the first hip-hop group to make rap genre mainstream successful by promoting their music videos on MTV.

Control Machete were the first hip-hop group to earn money with music, to sign massive record deal contract such as Universal Music Group & Polygram, having tours on Latin America, United States, Spain & Germany & having the exact rap production formula as the American hip-hop industry standards. It has evolved to spanning more artists like Cartel de Santa, Dharius, Akwid, Kinto Sol, Alemán, Gera MX, Dyablo, Aczino, and many more.

=== Angel Caido ===
In Ericka Ruiz’s article published in Periodico Correo, she talks about Tornillo Vazquez new recently released diss-track called Angel Caido (RIP Santa Fe Klan). In the song, Tornillo confirms that Santa Fe Klan is the one who kicked him out 473 Music. Additionally, Tornillo Vazquez talks about Santa Fe Klan having a big ego that led him to deleting his music. Santa Fe Klan claims that Tornillo left on his own.

=== 250k ===
Gera Mx dissed Santa Fe Klan because of a conflict that emerged during a Spotify listening party in Mexico City. Allegedly Santa Fe Klan pulled out a gun on one of Gera MX friends, which triggered the beginning of the “beef.” In his song, “250K”, Gera MX references the amount of money Santa Fe Klan pays his son's mom in alimony. Additionally, he states that he has not seen his son in person despite living in the same city, Guadalajara, Jalisco. In the song, he also talks about how the person he claims to be on camera is not really who he is in reality.

== See also ==
- Hip-hop
- Narcocorridos
- Control Machete
- Cartel de Santa
- Akwid
- Kinto Sol
- Chicano rap - a subgenre of hip-hop and tied more to Mexican American gangs and street life experiences mostly on California.
- Mexican rock
- List of hip-hop genres
