= La Voz Senior (Peruvian TV series) season 1 =

Peruvian television series

La Voz Senior
- Season 1
- Hosted by: Cristian Rivero; Karen Schwarz
- Coaches: Eva Ayllón; Tony Succar; Daniela Darcourt; Pimpinela
- Winner: Mito Plaza
- Winning coach: Pimpinela
- Runners-up: Lourdes Carhuas, Luis Ángel Reddel, Oscar Centeno

Release
- Original network: Latina Televisión
- Original release: 27 August – 18 October 2021

La Voz Senior is a Peruvian reality talent program that premiered on August 27 in Latina Television. Based on the reality singing competition The Voice Senior, the series was created by Dutch television producer John de Mol and is part of The Voice franchise. This is La Voz Senior's first season on Latina Television, after La Voz Peru and La Voz Kids.

Eva Ayllón and Daniela Darcourt were announced to be part of the coaching panel of the season after serving as coaches on La Voz Perú fourth season, alongside first time coaches Tony Succar and the duo Pimpinela (Joaquín and Lucía Galán). This is the first season of the Peruvian version of the franchise to have a duo coach and chair. Cristian Rivero is the presenter of the show, joined by Karen Schwarz who presents the backstage on the final rounds.

Coaches for season one of La Voz Senior

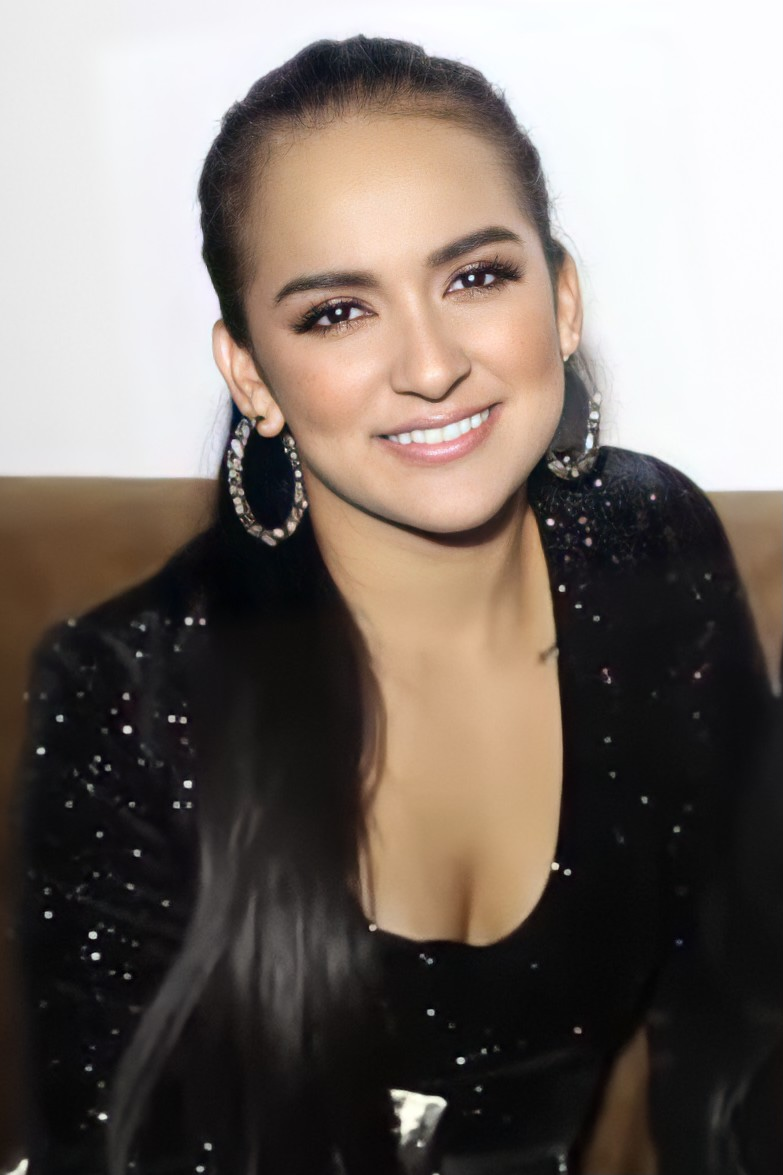
Daniela Darcourt

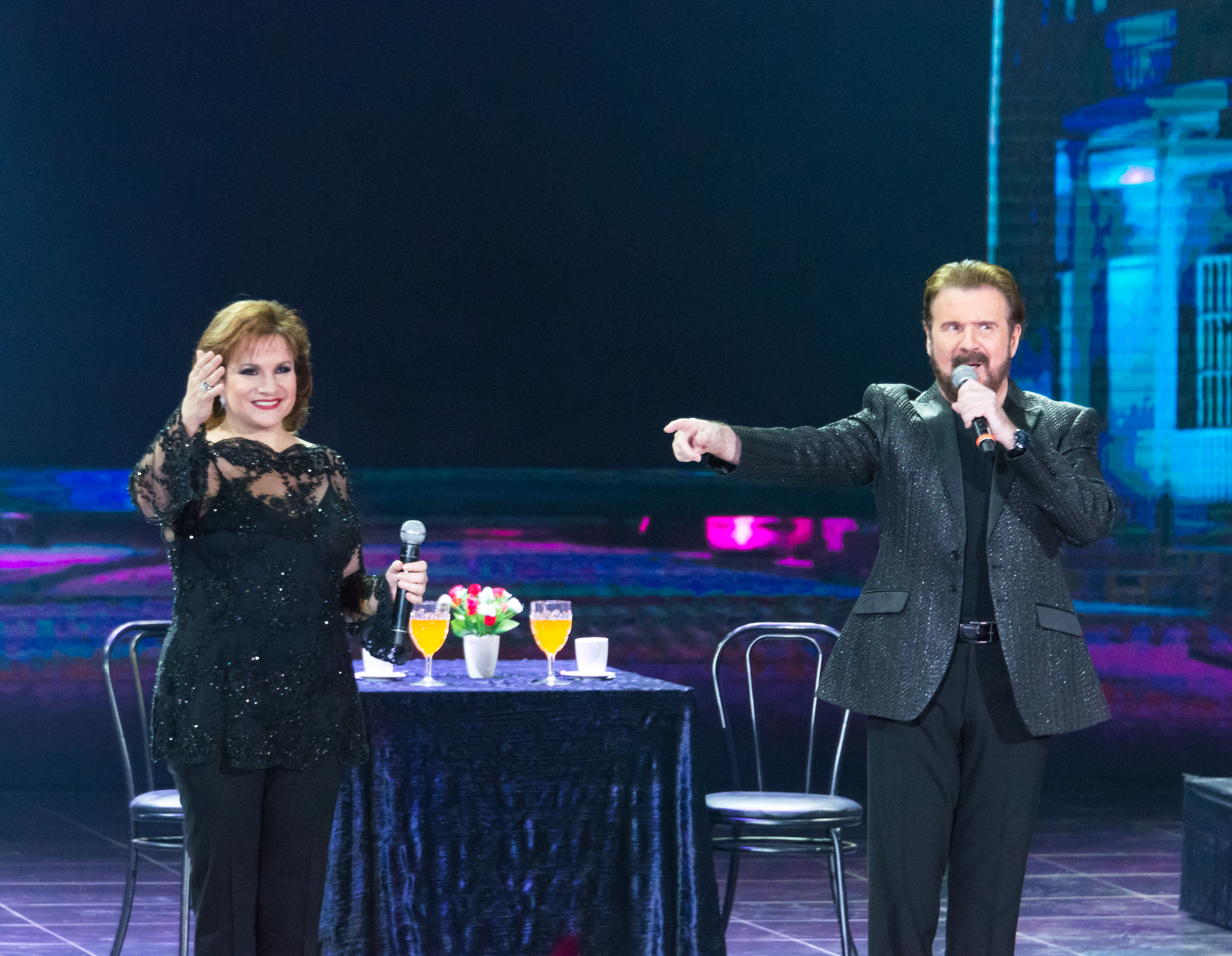
Pimpinela

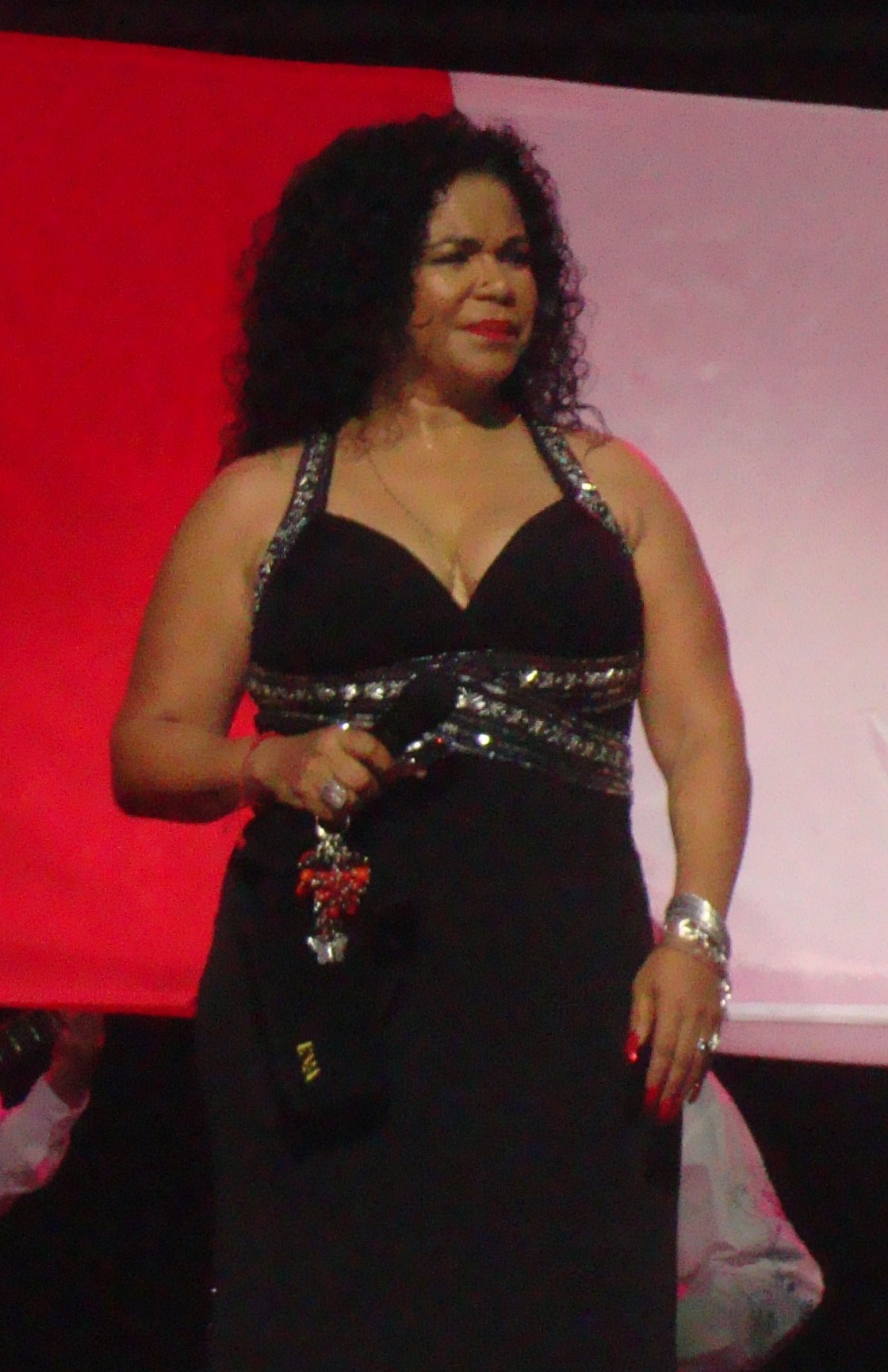
Eva Ayllón

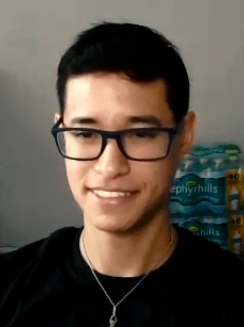
Tony Succar

== Teams ==
Color key

- Winner
- Runners-up
- Eliminated in the Concerts
- Eliminated in the Playoffs
- Eliminated in the Knockouts
- Stolen in the Battles
- Eliminated in the Battles
- Withdrew

Season one coaching teams
Coaches	Top 95 artists					
Daniela Darcourt						
Daniela Darcourt	Oscar Centeno	Caridad Plaza	Dodo	Pepo Orozco	Miguel Vallejo	Denys Torres
Daniela Darcourt	Alfredo Minaya	Andrés Eduardo	Carmen Puente	César Carbajal	Gotty	Gina Di Gianvito
Daniela Darcourt	Juan Jerufe	Julio César (†)	Lúz de América	María Vásquez del Perú	Panchito Morales	Rolando Ravenna
Daniela Darcourt	~~César Querevalu~~	~~Charito~~	~~Humberto Dávila~~	~~Juan Luyo~~	~~Lourdes González~~	Andrés Flores
Daniela Darcourt	Cecilio Costa	César Ballena (†)	Gladys Castro	Jorge Miranda	Luis Alberto Landeo	
Pimpinela						
Pimpinela	Mito Plaza	Ángela Caballero	Carlos Alonso	José Luis Meza	Rosa Muñoz	Jorge Luis Bendezú
Pimpinela	Betto Franco	Dante Dávila	Enrique Cuadros	Fernando Huaccha	Humberto Dávila	Jesús Augusto
Pimpinela	Juan José Piperis	Julia Figueroa	Julio Cesar Malquichaga	Lourdes González	Oscar Valdivia	Sergio Mainza
Pimpinela	~~Edi Zeballos~~	~~Joselo~~	~~Linda Romero~~	~~Lúz de América~~	~~María Vásquez del Perú~~	~~Marianne Larco~~
Pimpinela	Carmen Guerrero	Iván Arias	Lorenzo Nunura	Luis Antonio Pacheco	Mario Moreno	Patricia Alzola
Eva Ayllón						
Eva Ayllón	Luis Ángel Reddel	Julio César Mancilla	Maby Curich	Fernando Campos	Virginia Cano	Roberto Pescasio
Eva Ayllón	Alejandro Chumpitaz	Carlos Bartra	César Querevalu	Charito	Edi Zeballos	Edith Miranda
Eva Ayllón	Enrique Suárez	Jesús Alejandro	Jesús de la Cruz	Marianne Larco	Paco Arnao	Peter Jiménez
Eva Ayllón	~~Gina Di Gianvito~~	~~Javier Costilla~~	~~Lucho Santillan~~	~~Rosa Muñoz~~	~~Sergio Mainza~~	~~Yetzaida Pérez~~
Eva Ayllón	Ada Gavidia	Arturo Vicente	Bernardo Gutiérrez	José Luis Guevara	Miriam Zambrano	Walter Sebastián
Tony Succar						
Tony Succar	Lourdes Carhuas	Abel Alcántara	Reiser Vásquez	Los Bardos del Son	Eduardo Barrón	Lalo Quispe
Tony Succar	David Villavicencio	Javier Costilla	Joselo	Juan Luyo	Juan Reynoso (†)	Juan Ugarriza (†)
Tony Succar	Leo Hidalgo	Linda Romero	Lucho Santillan	Miguel Murguía	Salomé Zegarra	Yetzaida Pérez
Tony Succar	~~Dante Dávila~~	~~Gotty~~	~~Fernando Campos~~	~~Julio César~~	~~Julio Cesar Malquichaga~~	~~Rolando Ravenna~~
Tony Succar	~~Virginia Cano~~	Carlos Antonio Carbajal	Héctor Lingán	Lolo Barbagelata	María Talla	Remington Díaz
Note: Italicized names are stolen artists (names scratched through within former teams).

== Week 1: Blind auditions ==
Blind auditions started on 27 August. Each coach has three blocks to use during the auditions. At the end of the blinds, each coach must have 24 artists on their team.

Blind auditions color key
✔	Coach pressed "QUIERO TU VOZ" button
	Artist elected a coach's team
	Artist defaulted to a coach's team
	Artist was eliminated with no coach pressing their button
✘	Coach pressed "QUIERO TU VOZ" button, but was blocked by another coach from getting the artist
	Blocked by Daniela Blocked by Pimpinela Blocked by Eva Blocked by Tony

Blind auditions' results
Episode	Order	Artist	Age	Song	Coach's and artist's choices			
Episode	Order	Artist	Age	Song	Daniela	Pimpinela	Eva	Tony
Episode 1 (Friday, 27 August 2021)	1	Rosa Muñoz	70	"Propiedad privada"	—	—	✔	—
Episode 1 (Friday, 27 August 2021)	2	Fernando Campos	65	"Bienvenidos"	✔	✔	✔	✔
Episode 1 (Friday, 27 August 2021)	3	Mito Plaza	68	"Amar y Vivir"	✔	✔	✔	✔
Episode 1 (Friday, 27 August 2021)	4	Luis Aguilar	67	"Que no quede huella"	—	—	—	—
Episode 1 (Friday, 27 August 2021)	5	Luis Ángel Reddel	64	"Mi Buenos Aires Querido"	—	✔	✔	—
Episode 1 (Friday, 27 August 2021)	6	Charito	65	"Adiós Amor"	✔	—	—	—
Episode 2 (Saturday, 28 August)	1	Miriam Zambrano	60	"Contigo Perú"	✔	✔	✔	✘
Episode 2 (Saturday, 28 August)	2	Lolo Barbagelata	70	"Lagrimas negras"	✔	✔	—	✔
Episode 2 (Saturday, 28 August)	3	Willy De La Cadena	61	"Mi gran noche"	—	—	—	—
Episode 2 (Saturday, 28 August)	4	Dodo	65	"Gallo camarón"	✔	—	—	—
Episode 2 (Saturday, 28 August)	5	Juan Reynoso	80	"Motivos"	—	—	—	✔
Episode 2 (Saturday, 28 August)	6	Carmen Guerrero	61	"Chiclayano soy"	✔	✔	—	✔
Episode 2 (Saturday, 28 August)	7	Danffer Maravi	62	"La Bamba"	—	—	—	—
Episode 2 (Saturday, 28 August)	8	Carlos Antonio Carbajal	62	"El regreso"	✔	—	—	✔
Episode 2 (Saturday, 28 August)	9	Francisco Terrones	61	"Ojos negros"	—	—	—	—
Episode 2 (Saturday, 28 August)	10	Arturo Vicente	79	"Elsa"	✔	✔	✔	✔
Episode 2 (Saturday, 28 August)	11	Jorge Luis Bendezú	62	"Laura no está”	✔	✔	✔	✔

== Week 2 ==
Blind auditions' results
Episode	Order	Artist	Age	Song	Coach's and artist's choices			
Episode	Order	Artist	Age	Song	Daniela	Pimpinela	Eva	Tony
Episode 3 (Monday, 30 August)	1	Betto Franco	62	"Ahora Te Puedes Marchar"	✔	✔	✔	—
Episode 3 (Monday, 30 August)	2	Virginia Yolanda Cano	82	"Inolvidable"	—	✔	—	✔
Episode 3 (Monday, 30 August)	3	Enrique Suárez	80	"Piel canela"	✔	✔	✔	✔
Episode 3 (Monday, 30 August)	4	Luis Tayo Migliori	83	"Vas a acordarte de mí"	—	—	—	—
Episode 3 (Monday, 30 August)	5	Juan Jerufe	72	"El Loco"	✔	—	✔	—
Episode 3 (Monday, 30 August)	6	Iván Arias	63	"La Barca"	—	✔	—	—
Episode 4 (Tuesday, 31 August)	1	Jesús de la Cruz	60	"Yo soy huancaíno"	✔	—	✔	✔
Episode 4 (Tuesday, 31 August)	2	Andrés Flores "Chango"	74	"El Preso"	✔	—	—	—
Episode 4 (Tuesday, 31 August)	3	Fernando Huaccha	62	"Perfidia"	✔	✔	—	✔
Episode 4 (Tuesday, 31 August)	4	María Menacho	60	"Huele a peligro"	—	—	—	—
Episode 4 (Tuesday, 31 August)	5	Jaime Soto	79	"En el juego de la vida"	—	—	—	—
Episode 4 (Tuesday, 31 August)	6	Juan Ugarriza	78	"Todo me gusta de ti"	✔	✔	✔	✔
Episode 4 (Tuesday, 31 August)	7	Los Bardos del Son	62	"El cuarto de Tula"	✔	✔	✔	✔
Episode 5 (Wednesday, 1 September)	1	Marianne Larco	60	"Derroche"	✔	✔	—	—
Episode 5 (Wednesday, 1 September)	2	Bernardo Gutiérrez	73	"La ventana"	✔	—	✔	—
Episode 5 (Wednesday, 1 September)	3	Carmen Puente	62	"A Mi Manera"	✔	—	—	—
Episode 5 (Wednesday, 1 September)	4	Rafael Reyes	66	"Dos gardenias"	—	—	—	—
Episode 5 (Wednesday, 1 September)	5	Eduardo "Lalo" Quispe	63	"El Rock de la Cárcel"	✔	✔	✔	✔
Episode 5 (Wednesday, 1 September)	6	Leo Hidalgo	66	"Perdóname"	✔	✔	✔	✔
Episode 6 (Thursday, 2 September)	1	Paco Arnao	73	"Inolvidable"	✔	✔	✔	✔
Episode 6 (Thursday, 2 September)	2	Pepo Orozco	60	"Pecado"	✔	—	✔	—
Episode 6 (Thursday, 2 September)	3	Ricardo Esteban	62	"Tiritando"	—	—	—	—
Episode 6 (Thursday, 2 September)	4	Abel Alcántara	61	"Casi Te Envidio"	✔	✔	✔	✔
Episode 7 (Friday, 3 September)	1	Felix "Gotty" Sánchez	78	"Todo tiene su final"	✔	—	—	✔
Episode 7 (Friday, 3 September)	2	Gloria Hoffmeister	67	"La guardia nueva"	—	—	—	—
Episode 7 (Friday, 3 September)	3	Luz de América	68	"Ya te olvidé"	✔	✔	—	—
Episode 7 (Friday, 3 September)	4	Javier Costilla	61	"La chismosa"	—	✔	✔	—
Episode 7 (Friday, 3 September)	5	Ángel Julca	62	"Amor prohibido"	—	—	—	—
Episode 7 (Friday, 3 September)	6	Humberto Dávila	63	"Noelia"	✔	—	—	—
Episode 7 (Friday, 3 September)	7	Carlos Alonso	66	"Tabaco y ron"	✘	✔	✔	✘
Episode 8 (Saturday, 4 September)	1	Manuel Pereyra	75	"Alma, corazón y vida"	—	—	—	—
Episode 8 (Saturday, 4 September)	2	Angela Caballero	71	"Nosotros"	—	✔	—	—
Episode 8 (Saturday, 4 September)	3	Joselo	63	"Amnesia"	—	✔	—	—
Episode 8 (Saturday, 4 September)	4	Dante Dávila	60	"Mis dolores"	—	✔	—	✔
Episode 8 (Saturday, 4 September)	5	Reiser Vásquez	61	"Chabuca limeña"	✔	✔	—	✔
Episode 8 (Saturday, 4 September)	6	Maby Curich	63	"Químbara"	✔	—	✔	—
Episode 8 (Saturday, 4 September)	7	Igor Gutiérrez	64	"La vaca blanca"	—	—	—	—
Episode 8 (Saturday, 4 September)	8	Miguel Vallejo	60	"Un verano en Nueva York"	✔	✔	—	✔
Episode 8 (Saturday, 4 September)	9	Lourdes Carhuas	67	"Ritmo, color y sabor"	✔	✔	✔ (Note: Tony tried to block Eva, but she turned around first. Therefore, the block is considered invalid.)	✔

== Week 3 ==
Blind auditions results
Episode	Order	Artist	Age	Song	Coach's and artist's choices			
Episode	Order	Artist	Age	Song	Daniela	Pimpinela	Eva	Tony
Episode 9 (Monday, 6 September)	1	Jaime Aguilar	72	"Paloma Torcaza"	—	—	—	—
Episode 9 (Monday, 6 September)	2	David Villavicencio	64	"Poquita fe"	✔	—	✔	✔
Episode 9 (Monday, 6 September)	3	María Vásquez del Perú	62	"Jamás impedirás"	✔	✔	—	—
Episode 9 (Monday, 6 September)	4	Humberto Lecca	70	"Contigo en la distancia"	—	—	—	—
Episode 9 (Monday, 6 September)	5	Alfredo Minaya	62	"Se mi lasci non vale"	✔	—	—	—
Episode 9 (Monday, 6 September)	6	Tino Tapia	65	"Todo pasará"	—	—	—	—
Episode 9 (Monday, 6 September)	7	Julio César Mancilla	65	"Murió la flor"	✔	—	✔	—
Episode 10 (Tuesday, 7 September)	1	Gina Di Gianvito	63	"Como tu mujer"	—	—	✔	—
Episode 10 (Tuesday, 7 September)	2	Carlos Landázuri	67	"El Triste"	—	—	—	—
Episode 10 (Tuesday, 7 September)	3	Walter Camarena	72	"Hilda"	—	—	—	—
Episode 10 (Tuesday, 7 September)	4	Jesús Alejandro	61	"Quién será"	—	—	✔	✔
Episode 10 (Tuesday, 7 September)	5	Andrés Eduardo	65	"Yo se que no es feliz"	✔	—	—	—
Episode 10 (Tuesday, 7 September)	6	Gloria Santiago	65	"Lágrimas de dolor"	—	—	—	—
Episode 10 (Tuesday, 7 September)	7	Rolando Ravenna	60	"Te conozco"	✔	✔	—	✔
Episode 10 (Tuesday, 7 September)	8	María Talla	68	"Jose Antonio"	✔	—	—	✔
Episode 11 (Wednesday, 8 September)	1	Enrique Cuadros	67	"Llorona"	—	✔	—	✔
Episode 11 (Wednesday, 8 September)	2	Juan José Piperis	70	"Gavilán o Paloma"	✔	✔	—	—
Episode 11 (Wednesday, 8 September)	3	Juan Chirinos	63	"Te quiero, te quiero"	—	—	—	—
Episode 11 (Wednesday, 8 September)	4	Gladys Castro	61	"Basta Ya"	✔	—	—	—
Episode 11 (Wednesday, 8 September)	5	Eduardo Barrón	62	"La rebelión"	✘	✔	—	✔
Episode 12 (Thursday, 9 September)	1	Nelson Correa	68	"Contigo aprendí"	—	—	—	—
Episode 12 (Thursday, 9 September)	2	Luz López	59	"Sabor a mí"	—	—	—	—
Episode 12 (Thursday, 9 September)	3	Rodrigo Villavicencio	65	"Como fue"	—	—	—	—
Episode 12 (Thursday, 9 September)	4	Jesús Augusto	65	"Hoy he empezado a quererte otra vez"	—	✔	—	—
Episode 12 (Thursday, 9 September)	5	Elizabeth Rodríguez	66	"Adoro"	—	—	—	—
Episode 12 (Thursday, 9 September)	6	Edi Zevallos	64	"América, América"	—	✔	—	—
Episode 12 (Thursday, 9 September)	7	Edith Miranda	62	"Escándalo"	✔	✔	✔	✔
Episode 13 (Friday, 10 September)	1	Miguel Murguía	61	"Bello durmiente"	✔	—	✔	✔
Episode 13 (Friday, 10 September)	2	Rosa Mendoza	73	"Soy peruana"	—	—	—	—
Episode 13 (Friday, 10 September)	3	Oscar Centeno	61	"Rumbera"	✔	—	—	✘
Episode 13 (Friday, 10 September)	4	Juan Elías	67	"De que manera te olvido"	—	—	—	—
Episode 13 (Friday, 10 September)	5	Mario Moreno	62	"La media vuelta"	—	✔	—	—
Episode 13 (Friday, 10 September)	6	Caridad Plaza	60	"Lágrimas negras"	✔	—	✔	—
Episode 14 (Saturday, 11 September)	1	Cecilio Costa	69	"Todos vuelven"	✔	—	—	—
Episode 14 (Saturday, 11 September)	2	María Elena Román	60	"La palabra final"	—	—	—	—
Episode 14 (Saturday, 11 September)	3	Alejandro Chumpitaz	64	"Perdóname"	—	—	✔	—
Episode 14 (Saturday, 11 September)	4	Mario Garrido	60	"Estoy hecho un demonio"	—	—	—	—
Episode 14 (Saturday, 11 September)	5	Tito Silva	62	"Mi gran noche"	—	—	—	—
Episode 14 (Saturday, 11 September)	6	Linda Romero	68	"Nube gris"	—	✔	—	—
Episode 14 (Saturday, 11 September)	7	Luis Arturo Alvan	82	"De qué manera te olvido"	—	—	—	—
Episode 14 (Saturday, 11 September)	8	César Carbajal	76	"Fina estampa"	✔	—	—	—
Episode 14 (Saturday, 11 September)	9	Graciela Blas	75	"Si una vez"	—	—	—	—
Episode 14 (Saturday, 11 September)	10	Patricia Alzola	61	"Con los años que me quedan"	—	✔	—	—
Episode 14 (Saturday, 11 September)	11	Roberto Milla	69	"Trotamundos"	—	—	—	—
Episode 14 (Saturday, 11 September)	12	Héctor Lingán	61	"Historia de un amor"	✔	✔	—	✔
Episode 14 (Saturday, 11 September)	13	Yetzaida Pérez	68	"Dos gardenias"	—	—	✔	—
Episode 14 (Saturday, 11 September)	14	Jorge Miranda	76	"Quién será"	✔	✔	✔	✔

== Week 4 ==
=== Last blind audtitions ===
Episode	Order	Artist	Age	Song	Coach's and artist's choices			
Episode	Order	Artist	Age	Song	Daniela	Pimpinela	Eva	Tony
Episode 15 (Monday, 13 September)	1	Luis Alberto Landeo	74	"Porque yo te amo"	✔	—	—	—
Episode 15 (Monday, 13 September)	2	Roberto Pescasio	62	"Ya lo sé que tú te vas"	✔	—	✔	—
Episode 15 (Monday, 13 September)	3	Julio César	70	"Just the way you are"	✘	✔	—	✔
Episode 15 (Monday, 13 September)	4	Luis Antonio Pacheco	72	"Cruel condena"	—	✔	—	—
Episode 15 (Monday, 13 September)	5	Beto Villa	77	"Piel Canela"	—	—	—	—
Episode 15 (Monday, 13 September)	6	José Luis Guevara	67	"Popotitos"	—	—	✔	—
Episode 16 (Tuesday, 14 September)	1	Lorenzo Nunura	61	"La Barca"	—	✔	—	—
Episode 16 (Tuesday, 14 September)	2	Tencha Peña Labrin	66	"Sabor á mi"	—	—	—	—
Episode 16 (Tuesday, 14 September)	3	Lourdes González	63	"Probablemente"	✔	—	—	—
Episode 16 (Tuesday, 14 September)	4	Walter Sebastián	74	"Yo perdí el corazón"	—	✔	✔	—
Episode 16 (Tuesday, 14 September)	5	Cesar Querevalu	68	"Secreto de Amor"	✔	✔	—	—
Episode 16 (Tuesday, 14 September)	6	Oscar Valdivia	63	"Lo dudo"	✔	✔	✔	✔
Episode 17 (Wednesday, 15 September)	1	Carlos Bartra	70	"Todo me gusta de ti"	—	✘	✔	—
Episode 17 (Wednesday, 15 September)	2	Julia Figueroa	63	"Yo perdí el corazón"	—	✔	—	—
Episode 17 (Wednesday, 15 September)	3	Cecilia Ortega	62	"Como una rosa roja"	—	—	—	—
Episode 17 (Wednesday, 15 September)	4	Denys Torres	68	"Te quiero tal como eres"	✔	✔	✔	✔
Episode 17 (Wednesday, 15 September)	5	Remington Díaz	62	"Reloj"	—	✔	—	✔
Episode 17 (Wednesday, 15 September)	6	Sergio Mainza	61	"Tu falta de querer"	✔	✔	✔	✔
Episode 18 (Thursday, 16 September)	1	César Ballena	78	"Mi Niña Bonita"	✔	—	—	—
Episode 18 (Thursday, 16 September)	2	Lucho Santillan	60	"Quiera Dios"	✔	—	✔	✔
Episode 18 (Thursday, 16 September)	3	Juan Luyo	59	"Los aretes de la luna"	✔	—	—	—
Episode 18 (Thursday, 16 September)	4	Salomé Zegarra	66	"Yo perdí el corazón"	✘	✔	✔	✔
Episode 18 (Thursday, 16 September)	5	Peter Jiménez	66	"Granada"	✔	✔	✔	✔
Episode 19 (Friday, 17 September)	1	Panchito Morales	71	"Rebeca"	✔	—	—	—
Episode 19 (Friday, 17 September)	2	Ada Gavidia	63	"Quiero que estés conmigo"	✔	✔	✔	✔
Episode 19 (Friday, 17 September)	3	Julio Cesar Malquichaga	62	"Esa Mujer"	✘	—	—	✔
Episode 19 (Friday, 17 September)	4	José Luis Meza	65	"Para siempre"	—	✔	—	—

=== Battles ===
The battles started airing on 19 September. This is the first-ever version of The Voice Senior to have battles and adapt the "steal" button twist; each coach could steal six artists. In this round, every contestant will choose a song of their choice and will battle their opponent. Battles' winners and stolen artists advance to the next round.

Artist won the battle and advanced to the knockouts
Artist lost the battle but was stolen by another coach and advanced to the knockouts
Artist lost the battle and was eliminated

Battles' results
Episode	Order	Coach	Song	Winner	Loser	Song	'Steal' result			
Episode	Order	Coach	Song	Winner	Loser	Song	Daniela	Pimpi-nela	Eva	Tony
Episode 20 (Saturday, 18 September)	1	Tony	"Mi niña bonita"	Juan Reynoso	Virginia Cano	"Risas y lágrimas"	✔	✔	✔	—N/a
Episode 20 (Saturday, 18 September)	2	Pimpinela	"Y se llama Perú"	Fernando Huaccha	Lorenzo Nunura	"Ódiame"	—	—N/a	—	—
Episode 20 (Saturday, 18 September)	3	Daniela	"Cómo fue"	Caridad Plaza	César Querevalu	"Angustia"	—N/a	—	✔	✔
Episode 20 (Saturday, 18 September)	4	Eva	"Me voy pa' La Habana"	Carlos Bartra	Sergio Mainza	"Vivir mi vida"	—	✔	—N/a	—
Episode 20 (Saturday, 18 September)	5	Pimpinela	"Voy a apagar la luz"	Angela Caballero	Marianne Larco	"Beso a beso"	✔	—N/a	✔	—
Episode 20 (Saturday, 18 September)	6	Eva	"Silencio"	Julio César Mancilla	Walter Sebastián	"Hoguera de amor"	—	—	—N/a	—
Episode 20 (Saturday, 18 September)	7	Daniela	"Trampolín"	Miguel Vallejo	Andrés Flores	"Cómo fue"	—N/a	—	—	—
Episode 20 (Saturday, 18 September)	7	Daniela	"Flor sin retoño"	Juan Jarufe	Andrés Flores	"Cómo fue"	—N/a	—	—	—
Episode 20 (Saturday, 18 September)	8	Tony	"Bemba colorá"	Lourdes Carhuas	Dante Dávila	"Flor de retama"	✔	✔	✔	—N/a

== Week 5 ==
Battles' results
Episode	Order	Coach	Song	Winner	Loser	Song	'Steal' result			
Episode	Order	Coach	Song	Winner	Loser	Song	Daniela	Pimpi-nela	Eva	Tony
Episode 21 (Monday, 20 September)	1	Daniela	"Quiero amanecer con alguien"	Carmen Puente	Charito	"Lo que son las cosas"	—N/a	✔	✔	✔
Episode 21 (Monday, 20 September)	2	Tony	"Hola Soledad"	Juan Ugarriza	Carlos Carbajal	"Nuestro Juramento"	—	—	—	—N/a
Episode 21 (Monday, 20 September)	3	Eva	"Te quiero, te quiero"	Roberto Pascasio	Gina Di Gianvito	"José Antonio"	✔	—	—N/a	—
Episode 21 (Monday, 20 September)	4	Eva	"Corazón"	Enrique Suárez	Rosa Muñoz	"Muñeca rota"	—	✔	—N/a	✔
Episode 22 (Tuesday, 21 September)	1	Daniela	"Esta Noche La Paso Contigo"	Andrés Eduardo	Lourdes Gonzáles	"Pal Bailador"	—N/a	✔	—	—
Episode 22 (Tuesday, 21 September)	2	Tony	"Puerta del amor"	Reiser Vásquez	Lolo Barbagelata	"Donde tú vayas"	—	—	—	—N/a
Episode 22 (Tuesday, 21 September)	3	Eva	"Solamente Una Vez"	Edith Miranda	Ada Gavidia	"Cada Domingo a las doce"	—	—	—N/a	—
Episode 22 (Tuesday, 21 September)	4	Pimpinela	"Tendría Que Llorar Por Ti"	Oscar Valdivia	Iván Arias	"Celos"	—	—N/a	—	—
Episode 22 (Tuesday, 21 September)	5	Tony	"Personalidad"	Lalo Quispe	Fernando Campos	"Santa Lucía"	✔	✔	✔	—N/a
Episode 23 (Wednesday, 22 September)	1	Eva	"Y Volveré"	Pedro Jimenez	Yetzaida Perez	"Bésame Mucho"	—	—	—N/a	✔
Episode 23 (Wednesday, 22 September)	2	Tony	"Amor por ti"	Leo Hidalgo	Remington Díaz	"Murió La Flor"	—	—	—	—N/a
Episode 23 (Wednesday, 22 September)	3	Daniela	"Angelitos Negros"	Pepo Orozco	Humberto Dávila	"Jamás Impedirás"	—N/a	✔	✔	✔
Episode 23 (Wednesday, 22 September)	4	Eva	"Noche Feliz"	Jesús Alejandro	Bernardo Gutiérrez	"Como te extraño mi amor"	—	—	—N/a	—
Episode 23 (Wednesday, 22 September)	5	Pimpinela	"La Gota Fría"	Carlos Alonso	Linda Romero	"Barbarás"	—	—N/a	—	✔
Episode 24 (Thursday, 23 September)	1	Daniela	"Cuando llora mi guitarra"	Panchito Morales	Cecilio Costa	"Nuestro Juramento"	—N/a	—	—	—
Episode 24 (Thursday, 23 September)	2	Tony	"Cali Pachanguero"	Eduardo Barrón	Julio César	"Can't Take My Eyes Off You"	✔	✔	—	—N/a
Episode 24 (Thursday, 23 September)	3	Pimpinela	"Secreto de amor"	José Luis Meza	Joselo	"Me llamas"	✔	—N/a	✔	✔
Episode 24 (Thursday, 23 September)	4	Eva	"Ojos azules"	Jesús de la Cruz	Javier Costilla	"Tu hipocresía"	—	✔	—N/a	✔
Episode 24 (Thursday, 23 September)	5	Pimpinela	"Persiana americana"	Betto Franco	Luz de América	"Así Fue"	✔	—N/a	—	—
Episode 25 (Friday, 24 September)	1	Daniela	"Close to You"	César Carbajal	Jorge Miranda	"Quizás, Quizás, Quizás"	—N/a	—	—	—
Episode 25 (Friday, 24 September)	2	Pimpinela	"A Mi Manera"	Juan José Piperis	Patricia Alzola	"Contigo en la Distancia"	—	—N/a	—	—
Episode 25 (Friday, 24 September)	3	Eva	"La Barca"	Paco Arnao	José Luis Guevara	"La chica de la boutique"	—	—	—N/a	—
Episode 25 (Friday, 24 September)	4	Pimpinela	"Me va a extrañar"	Jorge Luis Bendezú	Edi Zevallos	"Libre"	—	—N/a	✔	—
Episode 25 (Friday, 24 September)	5	Tony	"Cobarde cobarde"	Abel Alcántara	Julio Cesar Malquichaga	"Mientes tan bien"	—	✔	—	—N/a
Episode 26 (Saturday, 25 September)	1	Tony	"Déjala que siga"	David Villavicencio	Felix "Gotty" Sánchez	"Dónde estás corazón"	✔	—	—	—N/a
Episode 26 (Saturday, 25 September)	2	Daniela	"El muñeco de la ciudad"	Alfredo Minaya	César Ballena	"El Tisico"	—N/a	—	—	—
Episode 26 (Saturday, 25 September)	3	Pimpinela	"Puerto Montt"	Enrique Cuadros	Luis Antonio Pacheco	"No me amenaces"	—	—N/a	—	—
Episode 26 (Saturday, 25 September)	4	Eva	"El aprendiz"	Maby Curich	Miriam Zambrano	"Regresa"	—	—	—N/a	—
Episode 26 (Saturday, 25 September)	5	Daniela	"Silencio"	Oscar Centeno	Luis Alberto Landeo	"Vamos a darnos tiempo"	—N/a	—	—	—
Episode 26 (Saturday, 25 September)	6	Pimpinela	"Nuestro secreto"	Julia Figueroa	Carmen Guerrero	"Esta es mi tierra"	—	—N/a	—	—
Episode 26 (Saturday, 25 September)	7	Eva	"La Bikina"	Alejandro Chumpitaz	Arturo Vicente	"Negrita"	—	—	—N/a	—
Episode 26 (Saturday, 25 September)	8	Daniela	"Todo me gusta de ti"	Dodo	Gladys Castro	"Costumbres"	—N/a	—	—	—
Episode 26 (Saturday, 25 September)	9	Tony	"Lo mejor que hay en mi vida"	Miguel Murguía	Héctor Lingán	"Volver Volver"	—	—	—	—N/a
Episode 26 (Saturday, 25 September)	10	Pimpinela	"Cariño bonito"	Jesús Augusto	María Vásquez del Perú	"Sincera confesión"	✔	—N/a	—	✔

== Week 6 ==
=== Last battles ===
Battles' results
Episode	Order	Coach	Song	Winner	Loser	Song	'Steal' result			
Episode	Order	Coach	Song	Winner	Loser	Song	Daniela	Pimpi-nela	Eva	Tony
Episode 27 (Monday, 27 September)	1	Eva	"Por una Cabeza"	Luis Ángel Reddel	Lucho Santillan	"Amor por ti"	—	—	—N/a	✔
Episode 27 (Monday, 27 September)	2	Tony	"Cenizas"	Salomé Reyes	María Talla	"Sombras nada más"	—	—	—	—N/a
Episode 27 (Monday, 27 September)	3	Daniela	"No pensé enamorarme otra vez"	Denys Torres	Juan Luyo	"Vagabundo"	—N/a	—	—	✔
Episode 27 (Monday, 27 September)	4	Pimpinela	"Corazón espinado"	Mito Plaza	Mario Moreno	"Amor de estudiante"	—	—N/a	—	—
Episode 27 (Monday, 27 September)	5	Tony	"Chan Chan"	Los Bardos del Son	Rolando Ravenna	"Loco"	✔	✔	—	—N/a

=== Knockouts ===
The knockouts started airing on 28 September. Each coach divided their teams into groups of three and selected only one artist to advance to the live shows.

Knockouts color key
Artist won the Knockout and advanced to the Live shows
Artist lost the Knokout and was eliminated

Knockouts' results
Episode	Order	Coach	Song	Winner	Losers	Song
Episode 28 (Tuesday, 28 September)	1	Pimpinela	"Amar y vivir"	Mito Plaza	Julia Figueroa	"Yo perdí el corazón"
Episode 28 (Tuesday, 28 September)	1	Pimpinela	"Amar y vivir"	Mito Plaza	Fernando Huaccha	"Perfidia"
Episode 28 (Tuesday, 28 September)	2	Daniela	"Un verano en Nueva York"	Miguel Vallejo	Rolando Ravenna	"Te conozco"
Episode 28 (Tuesday, 28 September)	2	Daniela	"Un verano en Nueva York"	Miguel Vallejo	Félix "Gotty" Sánchez	"Todo tiene su final"
Episode 28 (Tuesday, 28 September)	3	Tony	"El Cuarto de Tula"	Los Bardos del Son	Juan Ugarriza	"Todo me gusta de ti"
Episode 28 (Tuesday, 28 September)	3	Tony	"El Cuarto de Tula"	Los Bardos del Son	Javier Costilla	"La chismosa"
Episode 28 (Tuesday, 28 September)	4	Eva	"Inolvidable"	Virginia Cano	Jesús de la Cruz	"Yo soy huancaíno"
Episode 28 (Tuesday, 28 September)	4	Eva	"Inolvidable"	Virginia Cano	Carlos Bartra	"Todo me gusta de ti"
Episode 29 (Wednesday, 29 September)	1	Eva	"Bienvenidos"	Fernando Campos	Enrique Suárez	"Piel canela"
Episode 29 (Wednesday, 29 September)	1	Eva	"Bienvenidos"	Fernando Campos	Edi Zeballos	"América, América"
Episode 29 (Wednesday, 29 September)	2	Pimpinela	"Propiedad privada"	Rosa Muñoz	Sergio Mainza	"Tu falta de querer"
Episode 29 (Wednesday, 29 September)	2	Pimpinela	"Propiedad privada"	Rosa Muñoz	Enrique Cuadros	"Llorona"
Episode 29 (Wednesday, 29 September)	3	Daniela	"Te quiero tal como eres"	Denys Torres	Andrés Eduardo	"Yo se que no es feliz"
Episode 29 (Wednesday, 29 September)	3	Daniela	"Te quiero tal como eres"	Denys Torres	Juan Jarufe	"El loco"
Episode 29 (Wednesday, 29 September)	4	Tony	"Chabuca limeña"	Reiser Vásquez	Salomé Zegarra	"Yo perdí el corazón"
Episode 29 (Wednesday, 29 September)	4	Tony	"Chabuca limeña"	Reiser Vásquez	Juan Reynoso	"Motivos"
Episode 30 (Thursday, 30 September)	1	Tony	"La Rebelión"	Eduardo Barrón	Yetzaida Pérez	"Dos Gardenias"
Episode 30 (Thursday, 30 September)	1	Tony	"La Rebelión"	Eduardo Barrón	Leo Hidalgo	"Perdóname"
Episode 30 (Thursday, 30 September)	2	Pimpinela	"Laura no está"	Jorge Luis Bendezú	Humberto Dávila	"Noelia"
Episode 30 (Thursday, 30 September)	2	Pimpinela	"Laura no está"	Jorge Luis Bendezú	Juan José Piperis	"Gavilán o paloma"
Episode 30 (Thursday, 30 September)	3	Eva	"Químbara"	Maby Curich	Marianne Larco	"Derroche"
Episode 30 (Thursday, 30 September)	3	Eva	"Químbara"	Maby Curich	Edith Miranda	"Escándalo"
Episode 30 (Thursday, 30 September)	4	Daniela	"Rumbera"	Oscar Centeno	Alfredo Minaya	"Se mi lasci non vale""
Episode 30 (Thursday, 30 September)	4	Daniela	"Rumbera"	Oscar Centeno	Gina Di Gianvito	"Como tu mujer"
Episode 31 (Friday, 1 October)	1	Daniela	"Pecado"	Pepo Orozco	Panchito Morales	"Rebeca"
Episode 31 (Friday, 1 October)	1	Daniela	"Pecado"	Pepo Orozco	Julio César	"Just the way you are"
Episode 31 (Friday, 1 October)	2	Eva	"Ya lo sé que tú te vas"	Roberto Pescasio	Alejandro Chumpitaz	"Perdóname"
Episode 31 (Friday, 1 October)	2	Eva	"Ya lo sé que tú te vas"	Roberto Pescasio	Paco Arnao	"Inolvidable"
Episode 31 (Friday, 1 October)	3	Pimpinela	"Para siempre"	José Luis Meza	Jesús Augusto	"Hoy he empezado a quererte otra vez"
Episode 31 (Friday, 1 October)	3	Pimpinela	"Para siempre"	José Luis Meza	Oscar Valdivia	"Lo dudo"
Episode 31 (Friday, 1 October)	4	Tony	"Casi Te Envidio"	Abel Alcántara	David Villavicencio	"Poquita fe"
Episode 31 (Friday, 1 October)	4	Tony	"Casi Te Envidio"	Abel Alcántara	Miguel Murguía	"Bello durmiente"
Episode 32 (Saturday, 2 October)	1	Eva	"Mi Buenos Aires querido"	Luis Ángel Reddel	Charito	"Adiós amor"
Episode 32 (Saturday, 2 October)	1	Eva	"Mi Buenos Aires querido"	Luis Ángel Reddel	César Querevalu	"Secreto de amor"
Episode 32 (Saturday, 2 October)	2	Pimpinela	"Nosotros"	Angela Caballero	Betto Franco	"Ahora te puedes marchar"
Episode 32 (Saturday, 2 October)	2	Pimpinela	"Nosotros"	Angela Caballero	Dante Dávila	"Mis dolores"
Episode 32 (Saturday, 2 October)	3	Daniela	"Gallo camarón"	Dodo	César Carbajal	"Fina estampa"
Episode 32 (Saturday, 2 October)	3	Daniela	"Gallo camarón"	Dodo	María Vásquez del Perú	"Jamás impedirás"
Episode 32 (Saturday, 2 October)	4	Eva (Note: Team Eva's last knockout was only composed by two contestants, due to the withdrawal of Peter Jiménez.)	"Murió la flor"	Julio César Mancilla	Jesús Alejandro	"Quién será"
Episode 32 (Saturday, 2 October)	5	Tony	"Ritmo, color y sabor"	Lourdes Carhuas	Lucho Santillan	"Quiera Dios"
Episode 32 (Saturday, 2 October)	5	Tony	"Ritmo, color y sabor"	Lourdes Carhuas	Linda Romero	"Nube gris"
Episode 32 (Saturday, 2 October)	6	Tony	"El Rock de la Cárcel"	Lalo Quispe	Joselo	"Amnesia"
Episode 32 (Saturday, 2 October)	6	Tony	"El Rock de la Cárcel"	Lalo Quispe	Juan Luyo	"Los aretes de la luna"
Episode 32 (Saturday, 2 October)	7	Pimpinela	"Tabaco y ron"	Carlos Alonso	Lourdes González	"Probablemente"
Episode 32 (Saturday, 2 October)	7	Pimpinela	"Tabaco y ron"	Carlos Alonso	Julio Cesar Malquichaga	"Esa Mujer"
Episode 32 (Saturday, 2 October)	8	Daniela	"Lágrimas negras"	Caridad Plaza	Lúz de América	"Ya te olvidé"
Episode 32 (Saturday, 2 October)	8	Daniela	"Lágrimas negras"	Caridad Plaza	Carmen Puente	"A Mi Manera"

== Week 7: Playoffs ==
Color key

- Team Daniela
- Team Pimpinela
- Team Eva
- Team Tony
- Saved by her/his coach
- Not saved
- Immune
- Eliminated

Playoffs' performances and results
Artists	Eps. 33, 34 (4–5 Oct)	Ep. 35 (6 Oct)	Eps. 36, 37 (7–8 Oct)	Ep. 38 (9 Oct)
Abel Alcántara	"Hechicera"	—	—N/a	
Angela Caballero	"Bésame mucho"	—	—N/a	
Luis Ángel Reddel	"Nostalgias"	—	—N/a	
Oscar Centeno	"El Triste"	—	—N/a	
Carlos Alonso	"Fruta fresca"	"La Piragua"	—N/a	
Dodo	"Barco ciego"	"La Apañadora"	—N/a	
Lourdes Carhuas	"El Tamalito"	"Voy a apagar la luz"	—N/a	
Maby Curich	"Ritmo, color y sabor"	"De qué estoy hecha"	—N/a	
Caridad Plaza	—N/a		"El Yerberito"	—
Fernando Campos	—N/a		"Liberame"	—
Mito Plaza	—N/a		"Salva a mi hijo"	—
Reiser Vásquez	—N/a		"La casa del sol naciente"	—
Bardos del Son	—N/a		"Idilio"	"Preparen candela"
J. César Mancilla	—N/a		"Esclavo y amo"	"Tanto adiós"
José Luis Meza	—N/a		"Cataclismo"	"Juego de amor"
Pepo Orozco	—N/a		"Quiera Dios"	"Cómo quisiera decirte"
Eduardo Barrón	—N/a		"Timbalero"	"El Preso"
Miguel Vallejo	—N/a		"Julia"	"El Todopoderoso"
Rosa Muñoz	—N/a		"Caminito"	"Cariño"
Virginia Cano	—N/a		"Piel canela"	"Mar y cielo"
Denys Torres	"No hace falta"	"Porqué te tengo de olvidar"	Eliminated	
Jorge Luis Bendezú	"Piel de ángel"	"Goodbye yellow brick road"	Eliminated	
Lalo Quispe	"Símbolo sexual"	"Cuéntame"	Eliminated	
Roberto Pescasio	"Y volveré"	"La más bella herejía"	Eliminated	

== Week 8: Concerts ==
Color key

- Team Daniela
- Team Pimpinela
- Team Eva
- Team Tony
- Saved by her/his coach
- Not saved
- Immune
- Eliminated

Concerts' performances and results
Artists	Eps. 39, 40 (11–12 Oct)	Ep. 41 (13 Oct)	Eps. 42, 43 (14–15 Oct)	Semifinal, Ep. 44 (16 Oct)
Lourdes Carhuas	"Toro mata"	—	"Por esas trenzas"	"
Luis Ángel Reddel	"Amor desolado"	—	"Cada domingo a las doce"	"
Mito Plaza	"Detalles"	—	"Dos almas"	"
Oscar Centeno	"Te regalo el corazón"	—	"Cisne cuello negro"	"
Abel Alcántara	"Un verano en Nueva York"	—	"Comó podré disimular"	"
Ángela Caballero	"Veinte años"	—	"Noche de ronda"	"
Caridad Plaza	"Amor por ti"	"Parte de mi vida"	"Idilio"	"
Julio César Mancilla	"Vivir así es morir de amor"	—	"Cómo quisiera decirte"	"
Carlos Alonso	"Hola soledad"	"Carito"	"A Dios le pido"	Eliminated
Dodo	"Derroche"	—	"Ritmos negros del Perú"	Eliminated
Maby Curich	"Cuando salgo al escenario"	"Me muero"	"Loca"	Eliminated
Reiser Vásquez	"Mujer amante"	"América"	"Todo por nada"	Eliminated
Los Bardos del Son	"Compay gato"	"Oye el consejo"	Eliminated	
Fernando Campos	"Nube gris"	"Cómo fue"	Eliminated	
José Luis Meza	"Silencio"	"Te hice mujer"	Eliminated	
Pepo Orozco	"Mi niña"	"No morirá jamás"	Eliminated	

== Week 9: Finale ==
In the finale, the public votes for their favorite artist. The one with the most votes is named the Voice Senior of Peru.

Finale results
Episode	Coach	Artist	Order	Duet with coach	Result
Episode	Coach	Artist	Order	Solo song	Result
Episode 45 (Monday, 18 October)	Tony Succar	Lourdes Carhuas	1	"Ritmo, color y sabor"	Runners-up
Episode 45 (Monday, 18 October)	Tony Succar	Lourdes Carhuas	5	"Voy a apagar la luz"	Runners-up
Episode 45 (Monday, 18 October)	Eva Ayllón	Luis Ángel Reddel	2	"Nostalgia"	Runners-up
Episode 45 (Monday, 18 October)	Eva Ayllón	Luis Ángel Reddel	6	"Cuando llora mi guitarra"	Runners-up
Episode 45 (Monday, 18 October)	Daniela Darcourt	Oscar Centeno	3	"Rumbera"	Runners-up
Episode 45 (Monday, 18 October)	Daniela Darcourt	Oscar Centeno	7	"El Triste"	Runners-up
Episode 45 (Monday, 18 October)	Pimpinela	Mito Plaza	4	"El amor no se puede olvidar"	Winner
Episode 45 (Monday, 18 October)	Pimpinela	Mito Plaza	8	"Amar y vivir"	Winner
