= Sensual (Tito Rojas album) =

Studio album by Tito Rojas
- Released: 1990
- Studio: Melody Studios
- Genre: Latin, Salsa Tropical, Salsa Romántica
- Length: 39:36
- Label: Musical Productions
- Director: Julio Merced
- Producer: Julio Merced, Antonio "Tony" Moreno

Tito Rojas chronology
| Solo Con Un Beso (1988) | Sensual (1990) | Condéname (1992) |

Professional ratings
Review scores
| Source | Rating |
|---|---|
| AllMusic | 4/5 stars |

Sensual is the second studio album by Puerto Rican singer Tito Rojas, released in 1990 by Musical Productions. From this album songs such as Ella Se Hizo Deseo, Sensual and Siempre Sere stand out. It is currently considered one of the most notable musical comebacks in salsa history, after stalling his career on the album of the same name Tito Rojas in 1981. His hit Siempre Seré ranked number 35 in tropical songs on the Billboard charts in 1990.

== Background ==
The album was made after the stagnation in the career as a solo singer in 1981. Previously participating in 1983 with the Fania All Stars with "El Campesino", also recording another solo album Solo Con Un Beso although it did not have the expected success.

== Track listing ==
This list has been adapted from AllMusic and Discogs.

| No. | Title | Writer(s) | Length |
|---|---|---|---|
| 1. | "Doble" | Titti Sotto | 5:12 |
| 2. | "Me Voy O Me Quedo" | Eduardo Franco, J.C. Velázquez | 5:29 |
| 3. | "Tormenta de Amor" | Juan Cintrón | 4:52 |
| 4. | "Ella Se Hizo Deseo" | Gustavo Márquez | 5:02 |
| 5. | "Sensual" | Frantoni Santana | 4:13 |
| 6. | "Siempre Seré" | Manny Benito, Alejandro Jaén | 5:22 |
| 7. | "Este Amor" | Brian Howe, Jorge Luís Piloto | 4:55 |
| 8. | "Me Mata La Soledad" | Henry García | 4:37 |
| Total length: | | | 39:36 |

== Credits ==
This list of credits has been adapted from AllMusic.

| Artist | Credit |
|---|---|
| Raul Acevedo | Trumpet |
| Julito Alvarado | Arranger |
| Juan Andujal | Bass |
| Manny Benito | Composer |
| Juan Cintron | Composer |
| Celso Clemente | Bongos, Guest Artist |
| Papo Clemente | Congas, Guest Artist |
| Anthony Cruz | Choir/Chorus, Guest Artist, Vocals |
| Tito de Gracias | Guest Artist, Timbales |
| Hector Diaz | Choir/Chorus, Coros, Vocals |
| Drago | Design |
| Eddie Feijo | Guest Artist, Trumpet |
| Abel Figueroa | Guest Artist, Trombone |
| Eduardo Franco | Composer |
| Henry Garcia | Composer |
| Brian Howe | Composer |
| Polito Huertas | Guest Artist, Piano |
| Alejandro Jaén | Composer |
| Lutty Maldonado | Guest Artist, Trombone |
| Gustavo Márquez | Composer |
| Julio Gunda Merced | Director, Mezcla, Mixing, Producer |
| Antonio Moreno | Executive Producer |
| Tony Moreno | Executive Producer |
| Moisés Nogueras | Guest Artist, Trombone |
| Justo Pena | Engineer |
| Rey Pena | Engineer, Mezcla, Mixing |
| Roberto Perez | Arranger |
| Jorge Luís Piloto | Composer |
| Luis Quevedo | Guest Artist, Piano |
| Humberto Ramírez | Arranger |
| Miguel Rodriguez | Trumpet |
| Ricky Rodriguez | Arranger |
| Sam Rodriguez | Director, Trombone |
| Tito Rojas | Leader, Primary Artist, Vocals |
| Tito Rojas Y Su Orquesta | Primary Artist |
| Ramón Sánchez | Arranger |
| Ramon B. Sanchez | Arranger |
| Frantoni Santana | Composer |
| Jose Santiago | Bongos |
| Nino Segarra | Choir/Chorus, Coros, Guest Artist, Vocals |
| Salvador Solis | Choir/Chorus, Coros, Vocals |
| Titti Sotto | Composer |
| Juan Pablo Torres | Trumpet |
| Raffi Torres | Guest Artist, Trombone |
| Antonio Vazquez | Guest Artist, Trombone |
| J.C. Velázquez | Composer |
| Jorge Velazquez | Photograph |

== Charts ==
=== Weekly charts ===
| Chart (1991) | Peak position |
|---|---|
| US Tropical Albums (Billboard) | 6 |

=== Year-end charts ===
1991 year-end chart performance for Sensual
| Chart (1991) | Peak position |
|---|---|
| US Tropical Albums (Billboard) | 9 |
