= Killing of Peter Fechter =

18 year old German bricklayer killed crossing the Berlin wall in 1962

Peter Fechter
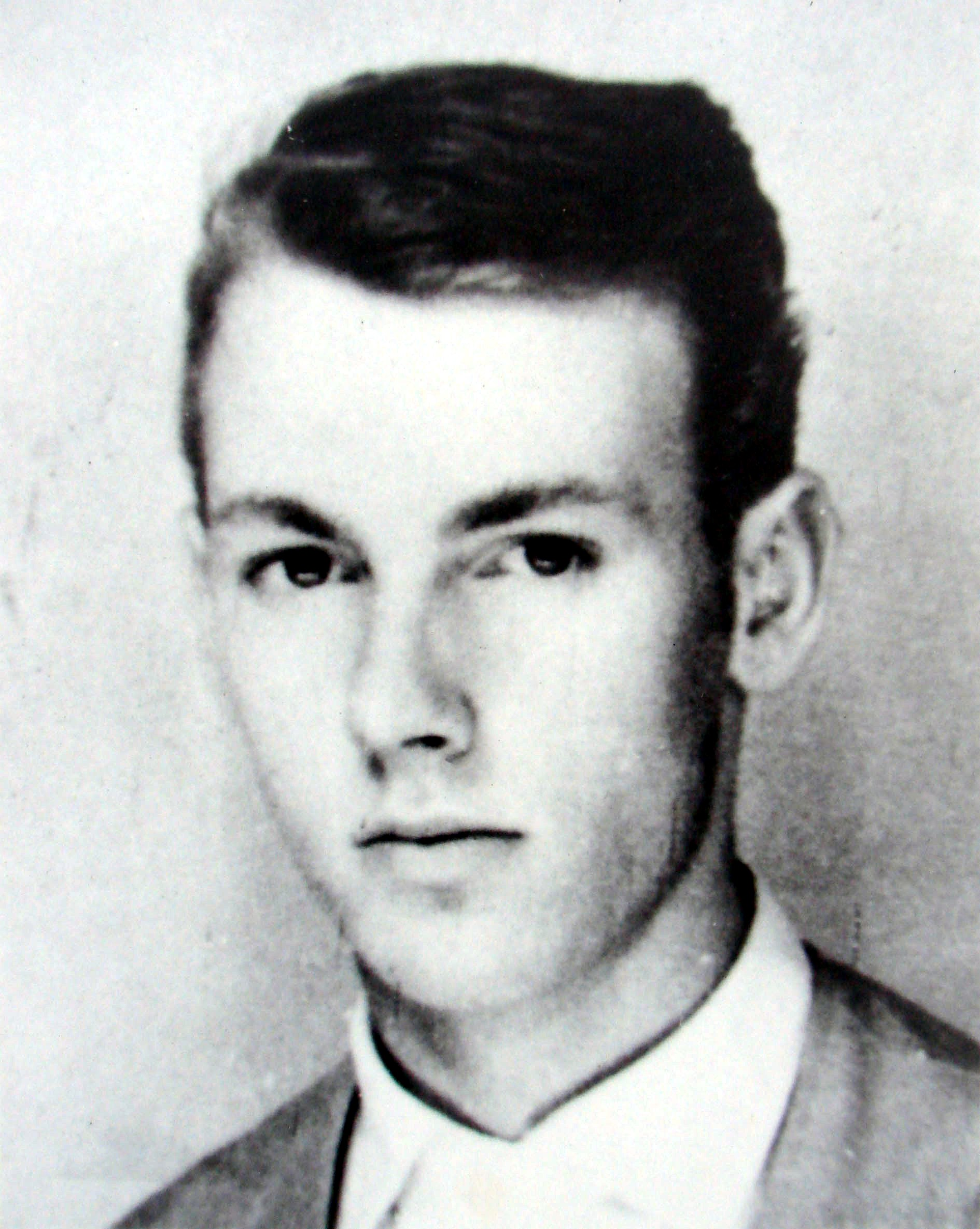
- Born: 14 January 1944; Berlin, Germany
- Died: 17 August 1962 (aged 18); Border Strip near Friedrich/Zimmerstrasse border crossing Checkpoint Charlie, East Berlin, East Germany
- Cause of death: Shot by a guard without warning while attempting to leave East Berlin
- Body discovered: Zimmerstrasse Death Strip; 52.5078°N 13.3935°E
- Monuments: Peter Fechter memorial
- Known for: One of the first and youngest fatalities and denied medical aid at the Berlin Wall

Peter Fechter (14 January 1944 – 17 August 1962) was an East German bricklayer who became the twenty-seventh known person to die at the Berlin Wall. Fechter was 18 years old when he was shot and killed by East German border guards while trying to cross over to West Berlin.

== Biography ==
Peter Fechter was born on 14 January 1944, in Berlin, Germany, during the final years of World War II. Fechter was the third of four children, and raised in the Weißensee district of Berlin. His father was a mechanical engineer and his mother was a saleswoman. Fechter finished school at the age of 14, and graduated as a bricklayer. After World War II had ended, Weißensee was located in the Soviet occupation zone of Berlin when the city was divided during the Allied Occupation, with the Soviet Sector later becoming East Berlin in East Germany. Fechter's eldest sister had married and now lived in West Berlin, where she was regularly visited by her parents and siblings. On 13 August 1961, the East German authorities abruptly closed the border and began construction of the Berlin Wall, effectively separating Fechter and his family from his sister in West Berlin. Fechter's colleague, Helmut Kulbeik, later stated that he and Fechter had been contemplating defecting to West Berlin for a while, and that they had also explored the border installations, but no concrete planning was ever made at the time. Shortly after, Fechter was denied a legally sanctioned trip to West Germany by his company, despite receiving good judgement.

== Death ==
Fechter's body lying next to the Berlin Wall after being shot in 1962 while trying to escape to the West

On 17 August 1962, around one year after the construction of the Berlin Wall, Fechter and Helmut Kulbeik attempted to flee from East Germany. The plan was to hide in a carpenter's workshop near the wall on Zimmerstrasse and, after observing the border guards from there, to jump out of a window into the "death-strip" (a strip running between the main wall and a parallel fence which they had recently started to construct), run across it, and climb over the two-metre (6.5 ft) wall topped with barbed wire into the Kreuzberg district of West Berlin near Checkpoint Charlie.

Their plan was initially successful as both Fechter and Kulbeik reached the final wall, but as they began to climb the East German border guards fired at them. Although Kulbeik succeeded in crossing over the wall, Fechter was shot in the pelvis while still climbing, in plain view of hundreds of witnesses. He fell back into the death-strip on the East German side, where he remained in view of West German onlookers, including journalists. Despite his screams, Fechter received no medical assistance from the East German side, and could not be tended to by those on the West side. West Berlin police threw him bandages, which he could not reach, and he bled to death after approximately one hour. As a result of his death, hundreds in West Berlin formed a spontaneous demonstration, shouting "Murderers!" at the border guards. The lack of medical assistance for Peter Fechter was attributed to mutual fear: Western bystanders were apparently prevented at gunpoint from assisting him, although according to a report in Time magazine, a second lieutenant of the US Army on the scene received specific orders from the US Commandant in West Berlin to stand firm and do nothing. It also emerged during the trial that any aid attempt from the West had indeed been made impossible, but according to a report from forensic pathologist Otto Prokop, "Fechter had no chance of survival. The shot in the right hip had caused severe internal injuries."

== Trial ==
In March 1997, seven years after the reunification of Germany and 35 years after Fechter's death, two former East German guards, Rolf Friedrich and Erich Schreiber, faced manslaughter charges for Fechter's death. Both admitted to the shooting after an intense investigation. They were both convicted and sentenced to 20 and 21 months' imprisonment on probation. Due to a lack of conclusive evidence, the court was unable to determine which of three gunmen (one of whom had already died) had fired the fatal bullet. After pleading guilty to the crime, during sentencing, both guards apologized for killing Fechter, saying that if they could take it back, they would, and that they were honestly remorseful for their actions.

== Commemoration ==
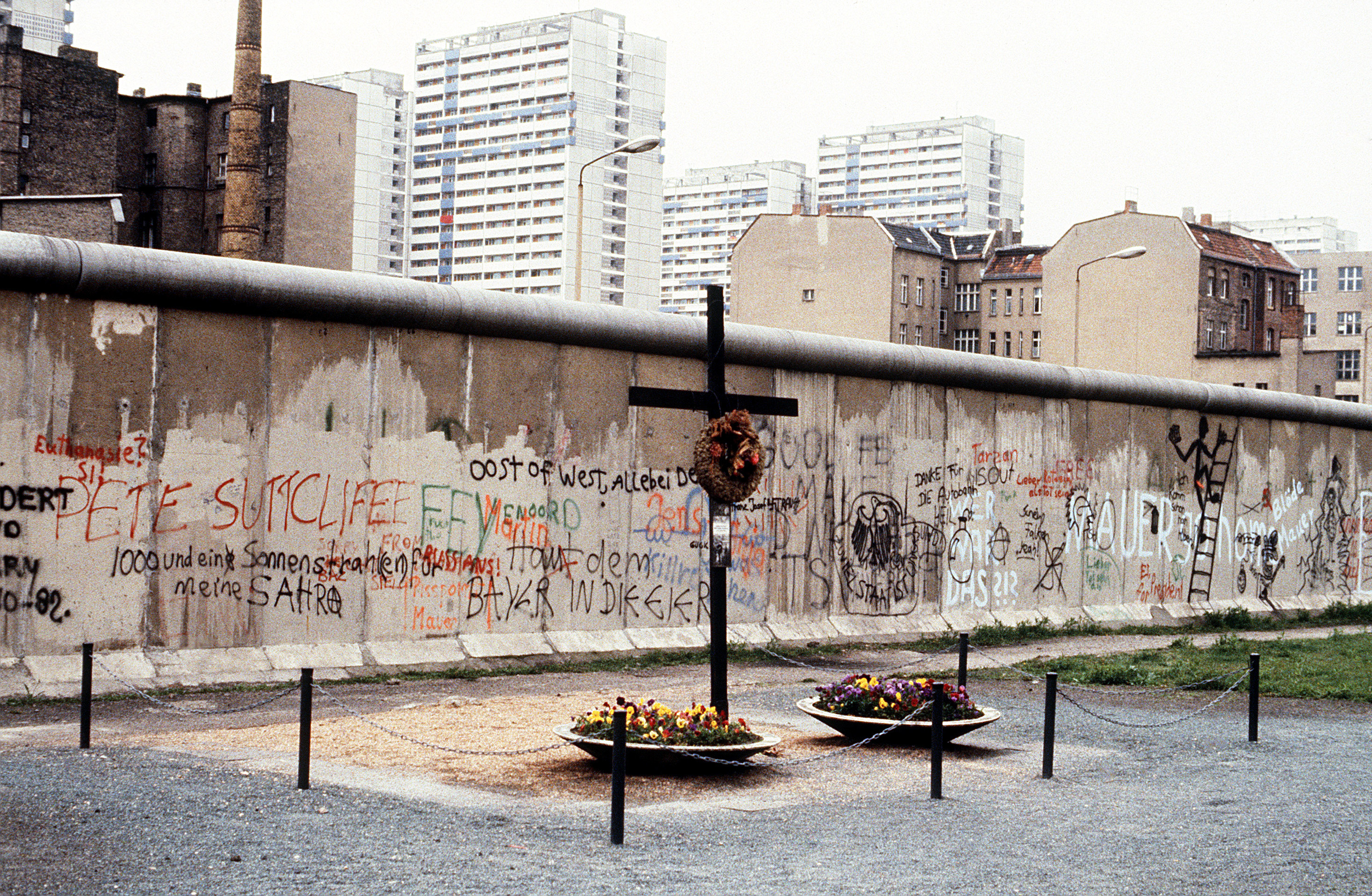
Peter Fechter memorial and wreath on the western side of the Berlin Wall, taken in 1984

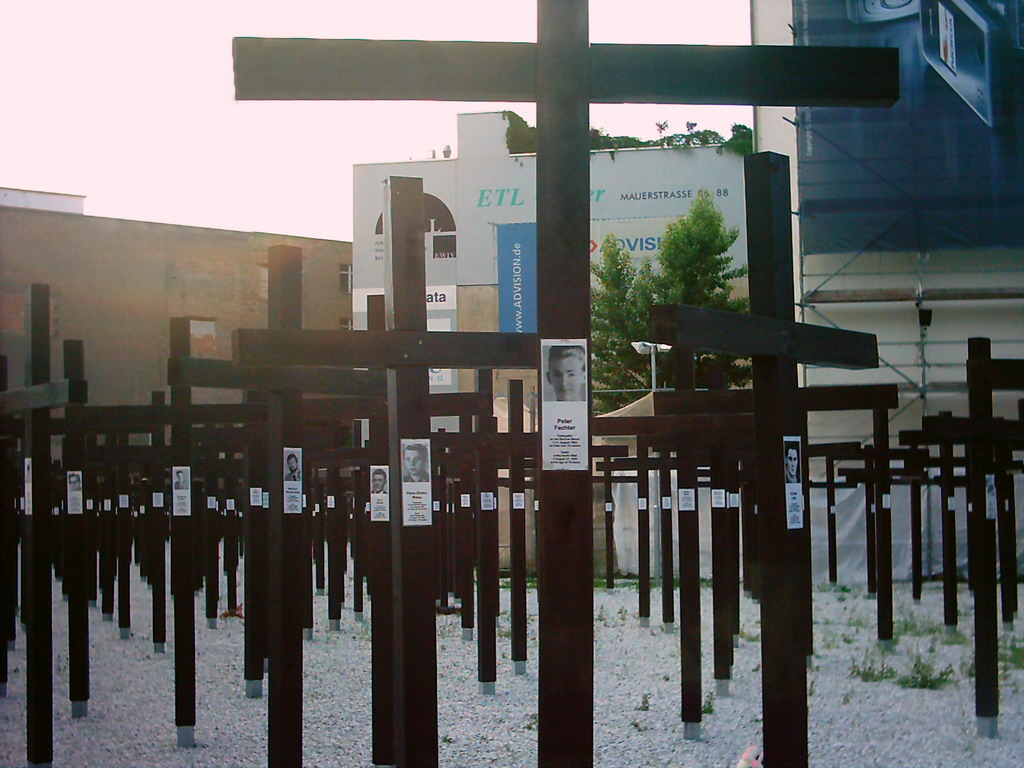
Peter Fechter memorial cross at Checkpoint Charlie

A cross was placed on the western side near the spot where Fechter was shot and bled to death. At the invitation of Willy Brandt, the mayor of West Berlin, the Yale Russian Chorus sang a German translation of Mozart's Ave Verum Corpus near the site in the week following the shooting. On the first anniversary, a wreath was placed there by Willy Brandt and US major general James Polk.

The story of Peter Fechter was the headline of American news magazine Time in August 1962. In this article, the expression "Wall of Shame" (Mauer der Schande) was coined, and this would become a synonym for the Wall.

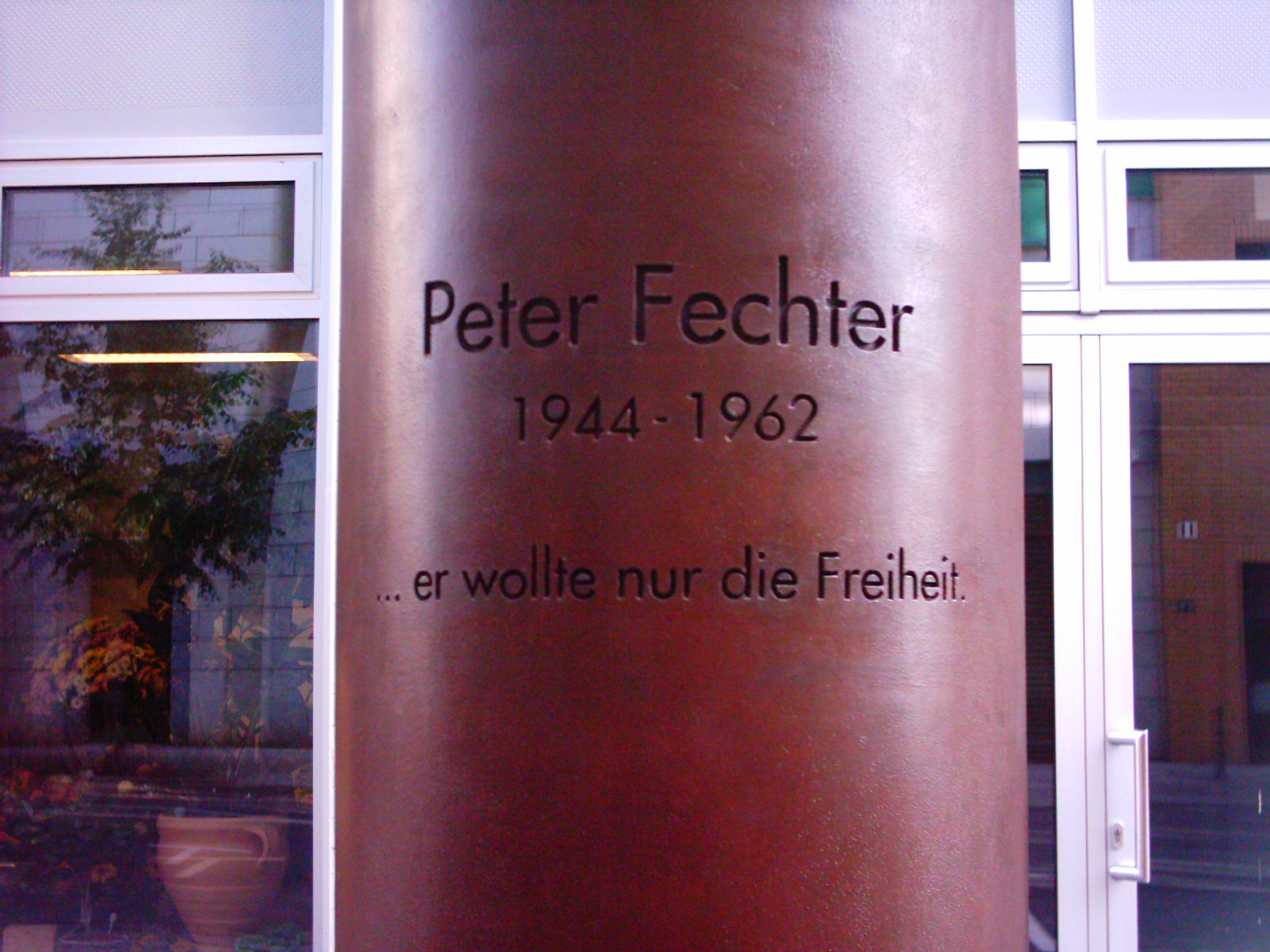
Memorial to Peter Fechter on Zimmerstraße reading "… er wollte nur die Freiheit." ("… he just wanted freedom.")

After German reunification in 1990, the Peter-Fechter-Stelle memorial was constructed on Zimmerstraße, at the precise spot where he had died on the Eastern side, and this has been a focal point for some of the commemorations regarding the wall. The shooting has also been the subject of documentaries on German television. Cornelius Ryan dedicated his book The Last Battle to the memory of Fechter. Composer Aulis Sallinen wrote an orchestral work Mauermusik to commemorate Fechter. In 2007, artist Mark Gubb was commissioned by the Institute of Contemporary Arts to create a performance based on the death of Peter Fechter. The performance was a one-hour live piece that was later recorded and screened at the ICA with a discussion panel at the end consisting of the artist, and actor Dominik Danielewicz who played the part of Peter Fechter. The 1972 ballad Libre ("Free") – a recording famous in all Ibero-America – by Spanish singer Nino Bravo, is widely believed to be in memory of this event, but its author, Pablo Herrero, says that it was actually written about the Franco dictatorship in Spain. In 2012 Canadian playwright Jordan Tannahill's play Peter Fechter: 59 Minutes, a poetic re-imagining of the final hour of Fechter's life, was produced in Canada and Berlin.

== Literature ==
- Christine Brecht: Peter Fechter, in: Die Todesopfer an der Berliner Mauer 1961–1989. Ein biographisches Handbuch. Links, Berlin 2009, ISBN 978-3-86153-517-1, S. 101–104.
- Lars-Broder Keil, Sven Felix Kellerhoff; Thomas Schmid (Hrsg.): Mord an der Mauer. Der Fall Peter Fechter. Mit einem Geleitwort von Klaus Wowereit. Quadriga, Köln 2012, ISBN 978-3-86995-042-6.
- Ralf Gründer: SED-Mordopfer Peter Fechter, in: Niemand hat die Absicht .... Screenshot-Fotografie von Herbert Ernst, gedreht in den Jahren 1961 und 1962 im geteilten Berlin. Berliner Wissenschafts-Verlag, Berlin 2018, ISBN 978-3-8305-3673-4, S. 342–369.
- Jordan Tanahill: Peter Fechter: 59 Minutes, in: Age of Minority. Toronto 2013, ISBN 978-1-77091-194-9.

== See also ==
- List of deaths at the Berlin Wall
- Berlin Crisis of 1961
- Eastern Bloc emigration and defection
- List of Eastern Bloc defectors
- Libre (Nino Bravo song)
- Filmaufnahme vom Abtransport des sterbenden Peter Fechter
