= Vendetta: First Round =

2014 EP by Ivy Queen

EP by Ivy Queen
- Released: 9 December 2014
- Recorded: September 2013 – October 2014
- Genre: Merengue; hip hop; dancehall
- Length: 14:54
- Language: Spanish
- Label: Siente Music
- Producer: Echo; Ladkani Beats; O'Nell Flow; Milliano Music; DJ Nelson

Ivy Queen chronology
Musa (2012)	Vendetta: First Round (2014)	Vendetta: The Project (2015)

Vendetta: First Round (English: Revenge: First Round) is the second extended play by Puerto Rican reggaetón singer-songwriter Ivy Queen. It was released on 9 December 2014 by Siente Music.

The EP includes the first four singles from the main album: "Soy Libre", "Vamos A Guerrear", "Naci Para Amarte", and the title track "Vendetta", on disc one. Disc two features a DVD with the music videos to these songs as well as a forty-five-minute documentary of the making of the album.

== Background ==
In August 2012, Queen released her eighth studio album, Musa. The album peaked at number fifteen on the Billboard Latin Albums chart and number two on the Billboard Latin Rhythm Albums chart. Upon its release, the album remained within the five best-selling albums of the urban genre, in the United States and Puerto Rico, according to SoundScan monitoring services of the recognized measurement firm Nielsen. However, it was the lowest first week sales for Queen since the release of her fourth studio album Real in 2004. It still, however, managed to receive a Latin Grammy Nomination for Best Urban Music Album at the Latin Grammy Awards of 2013.

It was announced in September 2013, that Queen had changed management and returned with Jorge "Goguito" Guadalupe, president and co-founder of Filtro Musik, to release her ninth studio album, entitled Vendetta. Following the birth of her first biological child, Queen then announced that she would embark on a U.S. tour entitled the "Viva Puerto Rico Tour". The tour, launched on 29 January 2014, included performances at various gay clubs in cities of the United States and Puerto Rico, such as New York, Orlando, Miami, Houston, Seattle, San Francisco, San Diego, Atlanta, Sacramento, Los Angeles, Tampa, and Ponce. The studio album version was originally announced for a release in February 2014, and later some time in 2014.

== Musical composition ==
=== Recording ===
The album was recorded in a mobile studio, in which Queen recorded in between family trips and tour stops. According to Queen, she named the album Vendetta, because of the sexism she received from concert promoters and businessmen due to the fact that she was impregnated. According to Queen, lyrically, the album speaks about war, among other topics. The album is claimed to be an effort by Queen to regain control of her musical career.

=== Musical composition ===
The lead single, the merengue, "Soy Libre", appears as the first track on the album. It was composed in major key tonality and contains lead vocals performed by Queen and group back-up vocals. It features simple harmonic progressions, a brass-horn ensemble, prominent percussion, synthesizers, techno synths and accordion or bandoneon playing. The track was extensively produced by DJ Nelson and O'Nell Flow. "Vamos A Guerrear", a collaboration with Ñengo Flow, was composed in minor key tonality. It features synthetic instrumentation and ambient synthesizers, being extensively produced by Echo. Lyrically, the song contains story-telling lyrics and emotional vocals performed by Queen and Flow. The two previously collaborated on Queen's ninth studio album, Musa on "Real G4 Life".

The dancehall "Nací Para Amarte", a collaboration with duo Jowell & Randy follows, at track number three. The song was composed in major key tonality, with individual verses being delivered by the trio, and group vocals performed during the chorus. Taking influences from reggae, the song was extensively produced by Milliano Music. The title track, "Vendetta", appears as the closing track. It was composed in minor key tonality and features emotional vocals and story-telling lyrics. It features extensive production by Echo and Ladkani Beats. Musically, the song contains synthetic instrumentation, techno synths, and synthesizers.

== Release and promotion ==
The extended play release of the album includes the first four singles from the album: "Soy Libre", "Vamos A Guerrear", "Naci Para Amarte", and the title track "Vendetta", on disc one. Disc two features a DVD with the music videos to these songs as well as a forty-five-minute documentary of the making of the album.

It was released on 9 December 2014 by Siente Music. Upon its release, it managed to debut at number thirty on the Billboard Latin Albums chart and number five on the Billboard Latin Rhythm Albums chart for the week of 27 December 2014.

== Track listing ==
Vendetta: First Round CD & DVD — Disc One
No.	Title	Writer(s)	Producer(s)	Length
1.	"Soy Libre"	Martha Pesante, O'Nell Lopez, Nelson Díaz, Jorge Guadalupe	O'Nell Flow, DJ Nelson	3:41
2.	"Vamos A Guerrear" (featuring Ñengo Flow)	Pesante, Guadalupe, Edwin Vázquez, Paul Irrizary	Echo	3:46
3.	"Nací Para Amarte" (featuring Jowell & Randy)	Pesante, Jorge Erazo, Joel Muñoz, Randy Ortiz, Migúel de Jesús	Milliano Music	4:17
4.	"Vendetta"	Pesante, Guadalupe, Izzirary, George Ladkani	Ladkani Beats	3:05
Total length:				14:54

Vendetta: First Round CD & DVD — Disc Two
No.	Title	Writer(s)	Producer(s)	Length
1.	"Soy Libre" (Music video)	Martha Pesante, O'Nell Lopez, Nelson Díaz	O'Nell Flow, DJ Nelson	3:46
2.	"Vamos A Guerrear" (Music video featuring Ñengo Flow)	Pesante, Edwin Vazqúez	Echo	4:14
3.	"Nací Para Amarte" (Music video featuring Jowell & Randy)	Pesante, Joel Muñoz, Randy Ortiz, Migúel de Jesús	Milliano Music	4:32
4.	"Vendetta" (Music video)	Pesante	Ladkani Beats	3:10
5.	"The Making of Vendetta"			45:00
Total length:				59:54

== Charts ==
Chart (2014)	Peak position
US Top Latin Albums (Billboard)	33
US Latin Rhythm Albums (Billboard)	5
