= Nino Bravo =

Spanish singer (1944–1973)

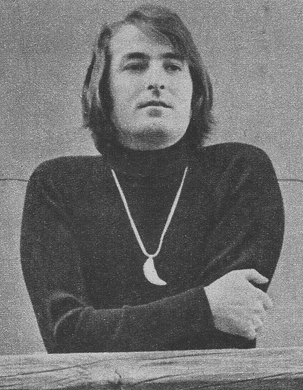
- Bravo in 1970

Background information
- Born: Luis Manuel Ferri Llopis; 3 August 1944; Aielo de Malferit, Spain
- Died: 16 April 1973 (aged 28) Villarrubio, Spain
- Genres: Baroque pop; Latin ballad
- Occupation: Singer
- Years active: 1969–1973
- Labels: Fonogram, Polydor
- Formerly of: Los Hispánicos, Los Superson

Luis Manuel Ferri Llopis (Aielo de Malferit, 3 August 1944 – Villarrubio, Cuenca, 16 April 1973), better known by his stage name Nino Bravo, was a Spanish baroque pop and ballad singer.

== Early life ==
Ferri Llopis was born in Aielo de Malferit (Valencia), Spain. His father, Luis Manuel, a salesman, moved the family to Valencia, in search of better opportunities, when his son was three years old. Young Luis met, in 1958, bassist Vicente López, who introduced him to other Valencian musicians. Ferri Llopis discovered he could sing while on a trip with López and Paco Ramón. López recalled that he was surprised, upon waking up from a nap, to hear him singing Domenico Modugno's hit "Libero". Deeply impressed, López predicted that Ferri Llopis would become a superstar.

Meanwhile, Ferri Llopis took a job as a jeweler, also working for his mother, who owned a supermarket. At age 16 he became a fan of the famous Chilean singer Antonio Prieto, whose song, "La Novia" ("The Bride"), had become a number one hit in Spain. Bravo and his friends formed a band, "Los Hispánicos", and made a cover recording of "La Novia".

== Singing ==
Bravo also enjoyed Rock & Roll music. He began singing at a hotel, where he sang his favorite English song, "Only You". Ferri Llopis was later approached by a recording company to sign with their label but he declined as the projected contract would not include the entire "Los Hispánicos" band. In 1964, "Los Hispánicos" changed their name to "Los Superson". They won a local radio contest "Fiesta de España", then moved on to Benidorm, where they became quite popular.

Ferri Llopis was soon after called up for military duty. Suffering from depression, he later contemplated quitting singing. While Ferri Llopis was away on military duty, his empresario López befriended Miguel Siurán, a radio personality, who was impressed by Los Superson's sound and wanted to help them get a recording contract. López declined as he felt Ferri Llopis should be included. When Ferri Llopis returned from his military service, López talked to him about the contract, but Siurán was initially doubtful, questioning the young man's singing ability, asking if he could sing like Tom Jones, Engelbert Humperdinck or John Rowles.

Siurán, however, became impressed with Ferri Llopis and took him to a music festival, "Festival de Cantantes Noveles de La Vall d´Uixò", where he performed Sergio Endrigo's "Canzone per te". Although the singer did not win at the festival, Siurán became convinced that it was time for Manolo Ferri Llopis to become a star; soon afterwards, Siurán came up with the artistic name of "Nino Bravo".

In those years, the compositions and quality of the Italian musician Nino Rota stood out. Ferri LLopis liked the name Nino because it needed no translation, and it was Siuran who completed it with the supposed surname "Bravo" which designated his strength and enthusiasm.

Bravo and Siurán first tried unsuccessfully to get a contract with RCA. They then went to Fonogram, in Madrid. Bravo and Siurán returned to Valencia, where Siurán published a newspaper ad announcing "Nino Bravo y Los Superson". Shortly thereafter, Fonogram called to offer a contract for an album with the band. On 16 March 1969, at the Teatro Principal in Valencia, shortly after his album was released, Bravo sang for the first time in front of a live audience. After the concert, crazed fans tore down Bravo's concert posters.

== Marriage ==
On 20 April 1970, he married María Amparo Martínez Gil and their first daughter, María Amparo Ferri Martínez, was born in 1972. They would have a second daughter, Eva, born after her father's death. Fonogram wanted Bravo to go solo; in 1970, Siurán was replaced by José Meri as Bravo's manager.

== Fame ==
In 1970, Bravo participated for the first time in the prestigious Barcelona Music Festival. He would not gain international acclaim until two festivals later, however. After Bravo received favorable reviews from a festival audience in Athens, Greece, he went on to impress festival goers at the Rio de Janeiro Festival. After being exposed to international audiences in Europe and Latin America, Bravo and Meri parted ways, and Bravo took on a new manager. His first solo album was soon released, and the song "Te quiero, te quiero", by the composer Augusto Algueró, became an international hit, which is now considered a classic by many Hispanic music critics. Bravo's first album, "Tu Cambiarás" ("You Will Change"), sold well, particularly in Colombia. Bravo later went on tour in Colombia and Brazil, where he participated, for a second time in the Rio de Janeiro Festival. In 1971, Bravo recorded his second album, later posthumously released in CD format as "Puerta de amor" ("Love's Door").

== Third album ==
In 1972, Bravo released a third album, "Libre" ("Free"), which was a huge success and led to him becoming widely known in Argentina, Colombia, Chile, Mexico, Ecuador, Puerto Rico, Venezuela, the Dominican Republic, Peru, and among the Hispanic population of the United States. The song also ended up taking on political associations in the hispanophone world - it was popular among supporters of the Pinochet regime, while other Latin American dictators of the time banned the album, including Fidel Castro. Bravo was also banned from singing in certain countries.

A song that he released in 1973, "Un beso y una flor" ("A Kiss and a Flower") became one of Bravo's greatest international hits.(Loosely translated, the song's chorus was "upon leaving, a kiss and a flower, an 'I love you', a caress and a farewell"). On 14 March 1973, Bravo performed his last concert, before his Valencia fans.

== Death ==
On April 16, 1973, Bravo was driving his BMW 2800 along with the Humo duo and Miguel Diurni when his car was involved in a crash about 100 km southeast of Madrid. He died en route to hospital from his injuries, aged 28. The official cause of death was not clarified and it was said he died from a hemopneumothorax and polytrauma.

== Discography ==
Studio albums

- Te Quiero, Te Quiero (1970)
- Nino Bravo (1971)
- Un Beso y Una Flor (1972)
- Mi Tierra (1972)
- ...Y Volumen 5 (1973)

== See also ==
- List of best-selling Latin music artists
