= Puerto Rican Power =

Puerto Rican salsa band

Puerto Rican Power Orchestra is a Puerto Rican salsa band which under this name supported Tito Rojas.

Puerto Rican Power was associated with singer Justo Betancourt, bassist Jesús Castro, trumpet player Luisito Ayala, singer Tito Rojas.

== Discography ==
- Tres Mujeres with Tito Rojas (1987)
- Solo Con Un Beso with Tito Rojas (1988)
- Canta Tito Rojas - hits "Quiéreme tal como soy", "Amor de mentira", "Noche de boda" and "Piel con piel",
- Con Más Poder
- Con Todo El Poder 1992, featuring the hit single "A Donde Iras"
- Men in Salsa, 1999.
- Wild Wild Salsa 2001
- Salsa Another Day 2003
- Exitos y Mas [DualDisc] 2006
- Salsa of the Caribbean 2007
- Orquesta Puerto Rican Power 2008
- Tranquilo y Tropical 2015
- Dos X Uno 2017
