= Vendetta (Ivy Queen album) =

2015 studio album by Ivy Queen

Vendetta: The Project

Studio album by Ivy Queen
- Released: 3 February 2015
- Recorded: September 2013 – October 2014
- Genres: Urban; hip hop; bachata; salsa
- Length: 2:03:24
- Language: Spanish
- Labels: Siente Music; Universal Music Latino
- Producers: Echo; Edwin "EZP" Perez; DJ Urba & Monserrate; Ladkani Beats; O'Nell Flow; Mambo Kingz; Lenny Medina; Rafi Mercenario; Keko Musik; Milliano Music; Musicologo & Menes; DJ Nelson; Dennis Nieves; Noriega; Lenny357

Ivy Queen chronology
Musa (2012)	Vendetta: The Project (2015)	Llego La Queen (2019)

Singles from Vendetta
- 1. "Soy Libre" Released: 9 December 2014; 2. "Vamos A Guerrear" Released: 9 December 2014; 3. "Nací Para Amarte" Released: 9 December 2014; 4. "Vendetta" Released: 9 December 2014

Vendetta: The Project (English: Revenge: The Project), also known simply as Vendetta, is the ninth studio album by Puerto Rican reggaetón singer-songwriter Ivy Queen, released on 3 February 2015. An extended play version of the album was released on 9 December 2014. The studio album version was originally announced for a release in February 2014, and later some time in 2014.

The extended play version of the album, entitled Vendetta: First Round, includes the first four singles from the album: "Soy Libre", "Vamos A Guerrear", "Naci Para Amarte", and the title track "Vendetta", on disc one. Disc two features a DVD with the music videos to these songs as well as a forty-five-minute documentary of the making of the album.

The album is composed of four separate simultaneously released albums, in the genres of urban, hip hop, bachata and salsa. Each releases contains eight songs musically devoted to the specific genre. The urban releases features Farruko, J Alvarez, Jowell & Randy and J King & Maximan, the hip hop release features Vico C, Fat Joe, Ñengo Flow and MC Ceja, the salsa release features Tito Rojas, Andy Montañez and Luisito Carrión, while the bachata release features Óptimo.

Although the album as a whole did not chart, the Urban and Hip-Hop releases entered the top 10 of the Billboard Top Latin Rhythm albums chart, the Bachata release entered the top 10 of the Billboard Top Tropical albums chart, with the Salsa release reaching the top 20.

== Background ==
In August 2012, Queen released her eighth studio album, Musa. The album peaked at number fifteen on the Billboard Latin Albums chart and number two on the Billboard Latin Rhythm Albums chart. Upon its release, the album remained within the five best-selling albums of the urban genre, in the United States and Puerto Rico, according to SoundScan monitoring services of the recognized measurement firm Nielsen. However, it was the lowest first week sales for Queen since the release of her fourth studio album Real in 2004. It still, however, managed to receive a Latin Grammy Nomination for Best Urban Music Album at the Latin Grammy Awards of 2013.

It was announced in September 2013, that Queen had changed management and returned with Jorge "Goguito" Guadalupe, president and co-founder of Filtro Musik, to release her ninth studio album, entitled Vendetta. Following the birth of her first biological child, Queen then announced that she would embark on a U.S. tour entitled the "Viva Puerto Rico Tour". The tour, launched on 29 January 2014, included performances at various gay clubs in cities of the United States and Puerto Rico, such as New York, Orlando, Miami, Houston, Seattle, San Francisco, San Diego, Atlanta, Sacramento, Los Angeles, Tampa, and Ponce.

== Recording and production ==
The album was recorded in a mobile studio, where Queen recorded in between family trips and tour stops. According to Queen, she named the album Vendetta, because of the sexism she received from concert promoters and businessmen due to the fact that she was impregnated. According to Queen, lyrically, the album will speak about war, among other topics. The album is claimed to be an effort and helping Queen regain control of her musical career. The album is to have collaborations with Jowell & Randy, Tempo, De La Ghetto, Ñengo Flow, and MC Ceja. It is also to have a rerecording of "Ángel Caído" from her 2004 studio effort, Real and a cover of Celia Cruz's "Quimbara" and "Bemba Colorá".

== Musical composition ==
The Salsa release makes the first eight tracks of the main album release. "Ella Me Hizo Deseo" appears as track four. The song features salsa singer Tito Rojas. It features male lead vocals, performed by Rojas. It was composed in minor key tonality, having roots in Afro-Latin American music. The song contains acoustic instrumentation, along with a brass horn ensemble. It features instruments such as the piano. The tribute cover of Celia Cruz's "Quimbara" and "Bemba Colora" appear as the sixth track. The song was composed in minor key tonality and features a horn ensemble. It contains the use of vocal "call and response". "Casi Te Envidio" was previously recorded by Andy Montanez, in 1988, who is featured on Queen's rendition of the song. It appears as track eight on the main release and the closing track on the Salsa release.

The dancehall "Nací Para Amarte", a collaboration with duo Jowell & Randy follows, at track number twenty on the main release, number three on the First Round release and number four on the Urban release. The song was composed in major key tonality, with individual verses being delivered by the trio, and group vocals performed during the chorus. Taking influences from reggae, the song was extensively produced by Milliano Music. The lead single, the merengue, "Soy Libre", appears as the twenty-second track on the main release, the opening track on the First Round release and number six on the Urban release. It was composed in major key tonality and contains lead vocals performed by Queen and group back-up vocals. It features simple harmonic progressions, a brass-horn ensemble, prominent percussion, synthesizers, techno synths and accordion or bandoneon playing. The track was extensively produced by DJ Nelson and O'Nell Flow.

"Vamos A Guerrear", a collaboration with Ñengo Flow, appears as track number twenty-six on the main release, number two on both the First Round and Hip Hop releases. It was composed in minor key tonality. It features synthetic instrumentation and ambient synthesizers, being extensively produced by Echo. Lyrically, the song contains story-telling lyrics and emotional vocals performed by Queen and Flow. The title track and final single, "Vendetta", appears as track twenty-seven on the main release, number four on the First Round release and number three on the Hip Hop release. It was composed in minor key tonality and features emotional vocals and story-telling lyrics. It features extensive production by Echo and Ladkani Beats. Musically, the song contains synthetic instrumentation, techno synths, and synthesizers.

== Release and promotion ==
The extended play version of the album includes the first four singles from the album: "Soy Libre", "Vamos A Guerrear", "Naci Para Amarte", and the title track "Vendetta", on disc one. Disc two features a DVD with the music videos to these songs as well as a forty-five-minute documentary of the making of the album.

It was released on 9 December 2014 by Siente Music. Upon its release, it managed to debut at number thirty on the Billboard Latin Albums chart and number five on the Billboard Latin Rhythm Albums chart for the week of 27 December 2014.

In September 2015, it was announced that the four albums would be released again, due to the folding of VeneMusic, the project's record label in charge of distribution. The albums were rereleased on 10 November 2015.

In April 2017, a music video for "Sola" was recorded and released on the video sharing website YouTube. As of April 2017, it has over 700,000 views. Lyric videos for "Vendetta" and "Sin Mi" were also released.

== Commercial performance ==
The four EPs impacted the Billboard charts for the week of February 21, 2015. Vendetta: Bachata debuted at number six on the Billboard Tropical Albums chart, with Vendetta: Salsa debuting at number seventeen. Vendetta: Urban and Vendetta: Hip Hop debuted at numbers eight and nine on the Billboard Latin Rhythm Albums chart, respectively.

Although the song was not released as a single, "Te Sirvo De Abrigo" managed to debut at number twenty-five on the Billboard Latin Rhythm Airplay chart for the week of 20 June 2015, becoming the album's only song to impact Billboard. The following week, the song fell off the chart. For the week of 4 July 2015, it reentered the chart, peaking at number twenty-three.

== Critical reception ==
Professional ratings
Review scores
Source	Rating
Allmusic	4.0/5 stars

According to Allmusic's David Jefferies, the album is Queen's response to the "male chauvinists within the music industry". He called the message and presentation "epic", while claiming the genre separations to be "interesting listen". However, he chose the collection release as a whole, "as it presents the Queen’s angry and awesome return in total". He gave Vendetta: The Project of four out of five stars, while the individual releases each received a rating of three and a half out of five stars. On the salsa release, Jefferies selected "De Pronto Desperte", "Un Hombre Bueno", "Se Me Vuelve A Olvidar" and the tribute to Celia Cruz as the stand out tracks. On the bachata release, he selected "No Soy Aquella", "Mas Feliz Asi" and "Por Un Descuido". On the hip hop release, Jefferies selected "Vamos A Guerrear", the title track, "I Don’t Know" and "Dime A Mi Quien". On the urban release, he selected "Sacude & Levantate", "Te Sirvo De Abrigo", "Naci Para Amarte" and "Soy Libre", while naming "Vamos A Guerrear", "Vendetta", "Naci Para Amarte" and "Soy Libre" as the key tracks from the album. Urban was selected as one of 2015's best Latin and World albums by Allmusic. Marcelo Baéz for Manero magazine praised "Te Sirvo De Abrigo" and "Quiero Castigo" for being "two of the heavier, dirtier tracks" on the album. He also complimented Queen's "tropical zest", labeling "Soy Libre" as being "passable". Baéz later criticized the songs that were not reggaeton, citing "Nací Para Amarte" and "Sacude & Levantate," as songs "where Ivy tries to emote but doesn’t quite hit the mark."

== Track listing ==
Vendetta: The Project
No.	Title	Writer(s)	Producer(s)	Length
1.	"De Pronto Desperté"	Martha Pesante, Jorge Guadalupe, Mikey Perfecto, Miguel Soto, Carlos García, Carlos Martinez	Carlos García, Carlos Martinez	4:32
2.	"Yare" (featuring Luisito Carrión)	Luis Carrión, Raúl Marero		5:23
3.	"Un Hombre Bueno"	Pesante, Guadalupe, Perfecto, Soto, García, Martinez	García, Martinez	3:52
4.	"Ella Me Hizo Deseo" (featuring Tito Rojas)	Pesante, Julio Rojas, Gustavo Marquez, Oscar Derudi		4:47
5.	"Se Me Vuelve A Olvidar"	Pesante, Guadalupe, Perfecto, Soto, García, Martínez	García, Martinez	4:03
6.	"Tributo A Celia: Quimbara/Bemba Colorá (Medley)"	Junior Cepeda, José Fumero, José Santiago		3:41
7.	"Dime Si Valió La Pena"	Pesante, Guadalupe	García, Martinez	4:06
8.	"Casi Te Envidio" (featuring Andy Montañez)	Maestro Moncada, Andrés Montanez, Francisco Cepero, Paco Cepero, Francisco Martinez	Paco Cepero	6:14
9.	"No Haz Podido"	Pesante, Guadalupe, Gabriel Gomez	Lenny 357	4:08
10.	"Dónde"	Pesante, Guadalupe, Edwin Perez, Pedro Polanco	Edwin "EZP" Perez	3:40
11.	"Ojo Ajeno"	Pesante, Guadalupe, Gomez	Lenny 357	3:06
12.	"No Soy Aquella"	Pesante, Guadalupe, Perez, Polanco	Edwin "EZP" Perez	3:50
13.	"Dime La Verdad"	Pesante, Guadalupe, Perez, Polanco	Edwin "EZP" Perez	2:57
14.	"Más Feliz Así"	Pesante, Guadalupe, Gomez	Lenny 357	3:09
15.	"A Dónde Va"	Pesante, Guadalupe, Gomez	Lenny 357	3:36
16.	"Por Un Descuido" (featuring Óptimo)	Pesante, Guadalupe, Alixandro Sánchez, Rogelito Santos, Carlos Casillas, Carlos Bermudez	Rogelito Santos	4:06
17.	"Sacude & Levantate"	Lenny Medina, Ahmed Barroso, Joey Montana	Lenny Medina, Ahmed Barroso	4:09
18.	"Te Sirvo De Abrigo" (featuring Farruko)	Pesante, Guadalupe, Jesus Benitez, Carlos Reyes, Edgar Vargas, Xavier Vargas	Mambo Kingz	3:24
19.	"Imborrable" (featuring J Alvarez)	Pesante, Javid Alvarez, Joel Ventura, O'Nell Lopez, Nelson Díaz	O'Nell Flow, DJ Nelson	3:50
20.	"Nací Para Amarte" (featuring Jowell & Randy)	Pesante, Joel Muñoz, Randy Ortiz, Migúel de Jesús, Jorge Erazo	Milliano Music	4:17
21.	"Sola"	Pesante, Guadalupe, Vargas, Vargas	Mambo Kingz	4:01
22.	"Soy Libre"	Pesante, Guadalupe, Lopez, Díaz	DJ Nelson, O'Nell Flow	3:42
23.	"Sin Mi"	Pesante, Guadalupe, Hiram Cruz	Keko Musik	3:07
24.	"Quiere Castigo" (featuring J-King & Maximan)	Pesante, Cruz, Jaime Borges, Héctor Padilla	Keko Musik	3:38
25.	"To My Brothers"	Pesante, Guadalupe, Paul Irrizary	Echo	3:22
26.	"Vamos A Guerrear" (featuring Ñengo Flow)	Pesante, Guadalupe, Irrizary, Edwin Vázquez	Echo	3:46
27.	"Vendetta"	Pesante, Guadalupe, Irrizary, George Ladkani	Echo, Ladkani Beats	3:04
28.	"Me Acuerdo" (featuring Vico C)	Pesante, Guadalupe, Cruz, Luis Lozada	Keko Musik	4:35
29.	"Lo Vamos A Danzar"	Pesante, Guadalupe, Johnny Lopez	Johnny Lopez	3:12
30.	"I Don't Know" (featuring MC Ceja)	Pesante, Irrizary, Alberto Mendoza	Echo	3:09
31.	"Dime A Mi Quién" (featuring Fat Joe)	Pesante, Guadalupe, Irrizary, Ladkani, José Cartagena	Echo	3:04
32.	"Ver Tu Fin"	Pesante, Guadalupe, Irrizary	Echo	3:51
Total length:				123:24

Vendetta: Salsa
No.	Title	Writer(s)	Producer(s)	Length
1.	"De Pronto Desperté"	Martha Pesante, Jorge Guadlupe, Mikey Perfecto	Carlos García, Carlos Martinez	4:32
2.	"Yare" (featuring Luisito Carrión)	Luis Carrión		5:23
3.	"Un Hombre Bueno"	Pesante, Guadalupe, Perfecto	García, Martinez	3:52
4.	"Ella Me Hizo Deseo" (featuring Tito Rojas)	Pesante, Julio Rojas		4:47
5.	"Se Me Vuelve A Olvidar"	Pesante, Guadalupe, Perfecto	García, Martinez	4:03
6.	"Tributo A Celia: Quimbara/Bemba Colorá (Medley)"	Junior Cepeda, José Fumero		3:41
7.	"Dime Si Valió La Pena"	Pesante, Guadalupe	García, Martinez	4:06
8.	"Casi Te Envidio" (featuring Andy Montañez)	Maestro Moncada, Andrés Montanez, Francisco Cepero, Paco Cepero, Francisco Martinez	Paco Cepero	6:14
Total length:				36:38

Vendetta: Bachata
No.	Title	Writer(s)	Producer(s)	Length
1.	"No Haz Podido"	Martha Pesante, Jorge Guadalupe, Gabriel Gomez	Lenny 357	4:08
2.	"Dónde"	Pesante, Edwin Perez, Pedro Polanco	Edwin "EZP" Perez	3:40
3.	"Ojo Ajeno"	Pesante, Guadalupe, Gomez	Lenny 357	3:06
4.	"No Soy Aquella"	Pesante, Perez, Polanco	Edwin "EZP" Perez	3:50
5.	"Dime La Verdad"	Pesante, Perez, Polanco	Edwin "EZP" Perez	2:57
6.	"Más Feliz Así"	Pesante, Guadalupe, Gomez	Lenny 357	3:09
7.	"A Dónde Va"	Pesante, Guadalupe, Gomez	Lenny 357	3:36
8.	"Por Un Descuido" (featuring Óptimo)	Pesante, Alixandro Sánchez, Rogelito Santos, Carlos Casillas, Carlos Bermudez	Rogelito Santos	4:06
Total length:				28:32

Vendetta: Urban
No.	Title	Writer(s)	Producer(s)	Length
1.	"Sacude & Levantate"	Lenny Medina, Ahmed Barroso, Joey Montana	Lenny Medina, Ahmed Barroso	4:09
2.	"Te Sirvo De Abrigo" (featuring Farruko)	Pesante, Jorge Guadalupe, Jesus Benitez, Carlos Reyes, Edgar Vargas, Xavier Vargas	Mambo Kingz	3:24
3.	"Imborrable" (featuring J Alvarez)	Pesante, Javid Alvarez, O'Nell Lopez, Nelson Díaz	O'Nell Flow, DJ Nelson	3:50
4.	"Nací Para Amarte" (featuring Jowell & Randy)	Pesante, Joel Muñoz, Randy Ortiz, Migúel de Jesús, Jorge Erazo	Milliano Music	4:17
5.	"Sola"	Pesante, Guadalupe, Vargas, Vargas	Mambo Kingz, Gabi Music	4:01
6.	"Soy Libre"	Pesante, O'Nell Lopez, Nelson Díaz	DJ Nelson, O'Nell Flow	3:46
7.	"Sin Mi"	Pesante, Gualaupe, Cruz	Keko Musik	3:07
8.	"Quiere Castigo" (featuring J King & Maximan)	Pesante, Cruz, Jaime Bolmes, Héctor Padilla	Keko Musik	3:38
Total length:				30:12

Vendetta: Hip Hop
No.	Title	Writer(s)	Producer(s)	Length
1.	"To My Brothers"	Pesante, Guadalupe, Paul Irrizary	Echo	3:22
2.	"Vamos A Guerrear" (featuring Ñengo Flow)	Pesante, Guadalupe, Irrizary, Edwin Vázquez	Echo	3:46
3.	"Vendetta"	Pesante, Guadalupe, Irrizary, George Ladkani	Echo, Ladkani Beats	3:04
4.	"Me Acuerdo" (featuring Vico C)	Pesante, Guadalupe, Hiram Cruz, Luis Lozada	Keko Musik	4:35
5.	"Lo Vamos A Danzar"	Pesante, Guadalupe, Johnny Lopez	Johnny Lopez	3:12
6.	"I Don't Know" (featuring MC Ceja)	Pesante, Irrizary, Alberto Mendoza	Echo	3:09
7.	"Dime A Mi Quién" (featuring Fat Joe)	Pesante, Guadalupe, Irrizary, Ladkani, José Cartagena	Echo	3:04
8.	"Ver Tu Fin"	Pesante	Echo	3:51
Total length:				28:02

== Personnel ==
- Primary Artist - Ivy Queen

== Charts ==
=== Weekly charts ===
==== Vendetta: First Round ====
Chart (2014)	Peak position
US Top Latin Albums (Billboard)	33
US Latin Rhythm Albums (Billboard)	5

==== Vendetta: Salsa ====
Chart (2015)	Peak Position
US Tropical Albums (Billboard)	17

==== Vendetta: Bachata ====
Chart (2015)	Peak Position
US Tropical Albums (Billboard)	6

==== Vendetta: Hip Hop ====
Chart (2015)	Peak Position
US Latin Rhythm Albums (Billboard)	9

==== Vendetta: Urban ====
Chart (2015)	Peak Position
US Latin Rhythm Albums (Billboard)	8
