= Casi Te Envidio =

Single by Andy Montañez

"Casi Te Envidio" (English: I Almost Envy You) is a song by Spanish flamenco singer Chiquetete from his eleventh studio album, Madrugada (1987). It was composed by Maestro Moncada, arranged by Eddy Guerin and produced by Paco Cepero.

== Andy Montañez version ==
"Casi Te Envidio"

Single by Andy Montañez

from the album El Eterno Enamorado
- Released: 16 July 1988
- Recorded: 1988
- Genre: Salsa
- Length: 5:21
- Label: TH Rodven Records
- Songwriters: Francisco Martínez, Paco Cepero, Eddy Guerín
- Producer: Paco Cepero

Andy Montañez singles chronology
"Con El Permiso De Mis Sentimientos" (1988)	"Casi Te Envidio" (1988)	"Te Voy A Saciar De Mi" (1988)

In 1988, "Casi Te Envidio" was recorded by Puerto Rican salsa recording artist Andy Montañez, from his eleventh studio album, El Eterno Enamorado. It was also produced by Paco Cepero and was released as the lead single from the album on 16 July 1988.

In 2015, Andy Montañez was featured on a recording of the song with Puerto Rican recording artist Ivy Queen, for her ninth studio album, Vendetta.

== Ivy Queen version ==
"Casi Te Envidio"

Song by Ivy Queen and Andy Montanez

from the album Vendetta Salsa
- Released: 3 February 2015
- Recorded: 2014
- Genre: Salsa
- Length: 6:14
- Label: Universal Music Latino
- Songwriters: Francisco Martínez, Paco Cepero, Eddy Guerín
- Producer: Paco Cepero

In August 2012, Queen released her eighth studio album, Musa. The album peaked at number fifteen on the Billboard Latin Albums chart and number two on the Billboard Latin Rhythm Albums chart. Upon its release, the album remained within the five best-selling albums of the urban genre, in the United States and Puerto Rico, according to SoundScan monitoring services of the recognized measurement firm Nielsen. However, it was the lowest first week sales for Queen since the release of her fourth studio album Real in 2004. It still, however, managed to receive a Latin Grammy Nomination for Best Urban Music Album at the Latin Grammy Awards of 2013.

It was announced in September 2013, that Queen had changed management and returned with Jorge "Goguito" Guadalupe, president and co-founder of Filtro Musik, to release her ninth studio album, entitled Vendetta. Following the birth of her first biological child, Queen then announced that she would embark on a U.S. tour entitled the "Viva Puerto Rico Tour". The tour, launched on 29 January 2014, included performances at various gay clubs in cities of the United States and Puerto Rico, such as New York, Orlando, Miami, Houston, Seattle, San Francisco, San Diego, Atlanta, Sacramento, Los Angeles, Tampa, and Ponce. Queen then announced that her she was working on her ninth studio album and that it would be released in February 2014, and later some time in 2014.

== Charts ==
=== Andy Montañez version ===
Chart (1988)	Position
US Hot Latin Tracks (Billboard)	13
