= Andy Montañez =

Puerto Rican musician (born 1942)

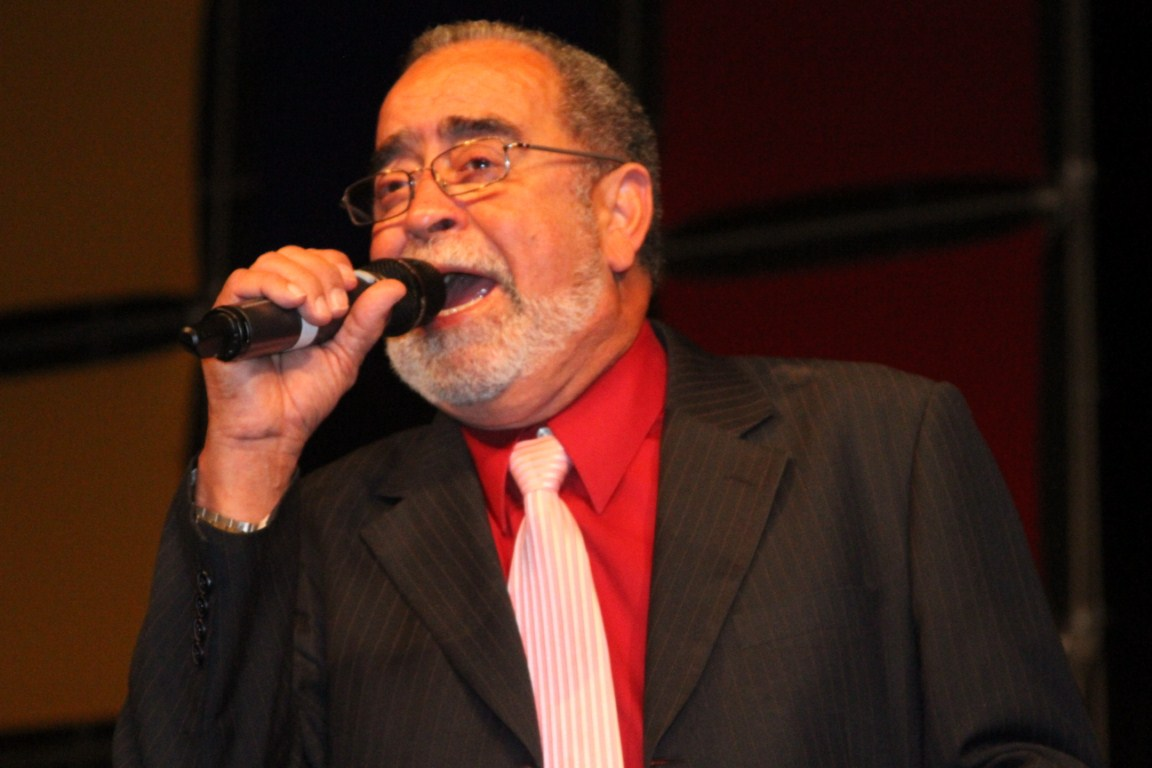

Background information
- Born: Andrés Montañez Rodríguez; May 7, 1942 (age 84); San Juan, Puerto Rico
- Genres: Salsa; bolero
- Occupations: Singer; songwriter
- Years active: 1962–present
- Website: www.andymontanezpr.com

Andrés Montañez Rodríguez (born May 7, 1942), better known as Andy Montañez, is a Puerto Rican singer and songwriter.

== Early life ==
Montañez is a native of Tras Talleres, a subbarrio of Santurce, in San Juan, Puerto Rico. He is known by the nicknames "El Godfather de la Salsa" and El Niño de Trastalleres.

== Musical career ==
Montañez first gained fame as a member of the internationally successful El Gran Combo group, with songs like "Hojas blancas" (White Leaves), "Un verano en N.Y." (A Summer in NY), "El barbero loco" (The Crazy Barber), "Julia", "Ponme el alcolado, Juana" (Rub Me With the Bay Rum, Juana), "Vagabundo" (Bum), "El Swing", etc. He stayed for approximately 15 years, producing 37 LPs. He left El Gran Combo to pursue a career with Venezuelan group La Dimension Latina, creating a feud between the two groups. After leaving El Gran Combo, he enjoyed considerable success on an international scale with his own orchestra, touring Latin America and the United States several times. He represented Puerto Rico at the 1992 World's Fair in Seville, Spain.

== Recent years ==
In recent years, he had teamed up with fellow salsa singer Ismael Miranda to produce some boleros and bohemian music. By 2005-06 he began creating a new blend between salsa and reggaeton, called salsaton. In April 2006, he released a new album titled Salsatón - Salsa con Reggaetón, which was produced by Sergio George and featured reggaeton rappers Daddy Yankee, Julio Voltio, La Sista, and John Eric. In 2007, he filmed various television advertisements on nutrition for the Puerto Rico Department of Family Affairs (including one in which he sang a rhumba to a dancing carrot).

On November 2, 2006, Montañez won his first Latin Grammy for Best Traditional Tropical Album, together with Pablo Milanés. Montañez was selected to form part of a benefit concert titled “Somos Haití”, where funds would be gathered to support Haiti after the 2008 hurricane season.

In 2015, Montañez appeared on Puerto Rican singer Ivy Queen's ninth studio album Vendetta. The album was split into four separate albums, one being an album composed entirely of only salsa music. On the album, Montañez dueted with Queen on a re-recording of his 1988 hit, "Casi Te Envidio".

== Personal life ==
Andy has five children, two daughters and three sons. Andy Jr. Harold, and Lisa have gone on to become salsa singers and have worked with their father for over 25 years, occasionally serving as back-up vocalists at his concerts. His oldest son, Andy Montañez Jr., died on July 24, 2019, at the age of 54.

== Discography ==
=== El Gran Combo (1962–1976) ===
- De Siempre (1963)
- Acángana (1964)
- Ojos Chinos-Jala Jala (1964)
- El Caballo Pelotero (1965)
- El Swing de El Gran Combo (1966)
- En Navidad (1966)
- Maldito Callo (1967)
- Esos Ojitos Negros (1967)
- Fiesta con El Gran Combo (1967)
- Boogalaoos (1967)
- Tú Querías Boogaloo?...Toma Boogaloo! (1967)
- Pata-Pata, Jala Jala, Boogaloo (1967)
- Tangos (1968)
- Los Nenes Sicodélicos (1968)
- Latin Power (1968)
- Smile! It's (1968)
- Éste Si Que Es (1969)
- Estamos Primeros (1970)
- De Punta a Punta (1971)
- Por el Libro (1972)
- En Acción (1973)
- Número 5 (1973)
- Disfrútelo Hasta el Cabo! (1974)
- Número 7 (1975)
- Los Sorullos (1975)
- Mejor Que Nunca (1976)

=== La Dimensión Latina (1977–1980) ===
- Los Generales de la Salsa (1977)
- Inconquistable (1978)
- Una Dimensión Desconocida (1978)
- Tremenda Dimensión (1978)
- Combinación Latina (1979)
- En el Madison Square Garden (1980)

=== Y Su Orquesta (1980–present) ===
- Salsa Con Caché (1980)
- Para Ustedes...Con Sabor! (1981)
- Trovador del Amor (1981)
- Sólo Boleros (1982)
- Hoy...y Ayer (1982)
- Tania y Andy (1984)
- Versátil (1984)
- Andy Montañez (1985)
- Mejor Acompañado Que Nunca (1987)
- El Eterno Enamorado (1988)
- Todo Nuevo (1990)
- El Catedrático de la Salsa (1991)
- El Swing de Siempre (1992)
- Cantando Voy Por el Mundo (1994)
- Quien No Se Siente Patriota (2006)
- Salsatón - Salsa con Reggaetón (2006)
- El Godfather de la Salsa (2007)
- Andy y Atabal (2008)
- De Andy Al Combo (2010)

== See also ==
- List of Puerto Ricans
