= Ella Se Hizo Deseo =

Single by Tito Rojas

from the album Sensual
- Released: 1990
- Recorded: 1990
- Genre: Salsa
- Length: 5:02
- Label: Musical Productions
- Songwriter: Gustavo Marquez
- Producers: Julio Merced, Antonio Moreno

Tito Rojas singles chronology
"Me Voy o Me Quedo" (1990)	"Ella Se Hizo Deseo" (1990)	"Siempre Sere" (1991)

"Ella Se Hizo Deseo" (English: She Discovered Her Desire) is a song by Puerto Rican salsa recording artist Tito Rojas, from his eighth studio album, Sensual (1990). It was composed by Gustavo Marquez, produced by Julio Merced and Antonio Moreno, and released as the lead single from the album in 1990.

In 2013, the song peaked at number 83 on the Billboard Mexico Popular Airplay chart. It was re-recorded with Puerto Rican recording artist Ivy Queen in 2015 for her ninth studio album, Vendetta.

== Charts ==
Chart (2013)	Position
US Mexico Popular Airplay (Billboard)	83
