= Tito Rojas =

Puerto Rican singer (1955–2020)

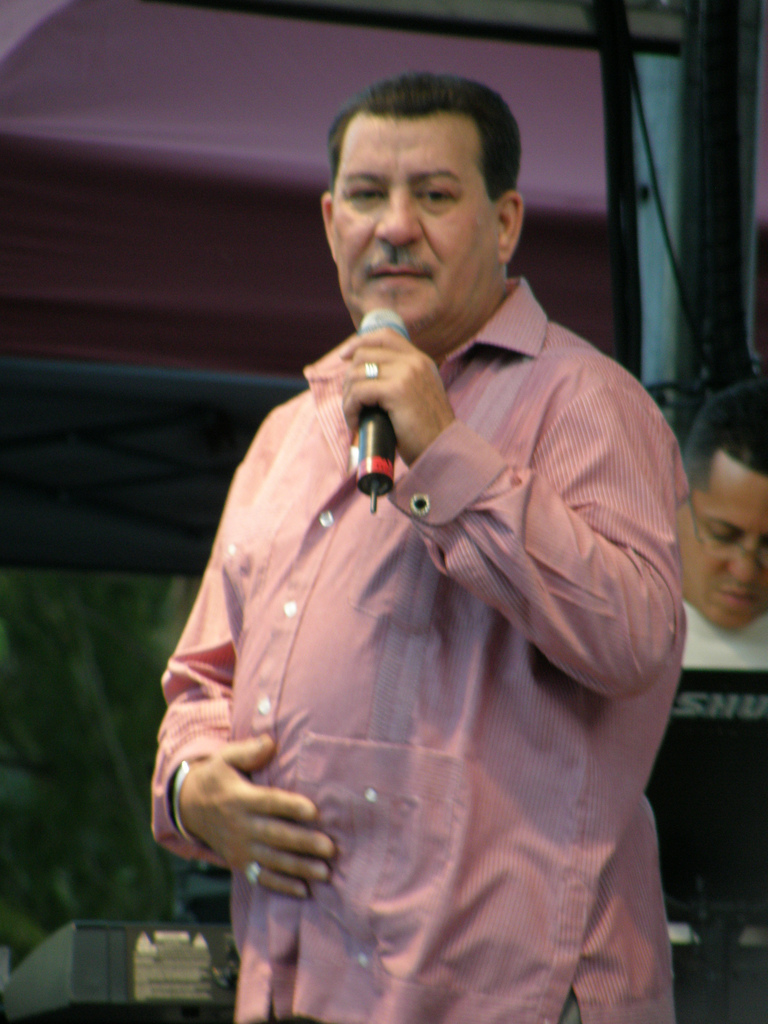

Background information
- Also known as: El Gallo Salsero
- Born: Julio César Rojas López; June 14, 1955; Humacao, Puerto Rico
- Died: December 26, 2020 (aged 65) Humacao, Puerto Rico
- Genres: Salsa
- Occupation: Singer
- Instrument: Vocals
- Years active: 1972–2020

Julio César "Tito" Rojas López (June 14, 1955 – December 26, 2020), also known as "El Gallo Salsero", was a Puerto Rican salsa singer.

== Early years ==
Tito Rojas was born and raised in the town of Humacao, Puerto Rico, which is located on the east coast of Puerto Rico. There, he received his primary and secondary education. He enjoyed singing to his family and he would also sing the latest salsa tunes with his friends.

== Singing career ==
In 1975, he auditioned for Pedro Conga and his International Orchestra and was hired as a singer. After a short while, he left the band and joined the "Conjunto Borincuba", conducted by Justo Betancourt, as lead singer. With this band, he participated in the recording of Con Amor (With Love), which became a "hit" in 1978.

That same year Rojas joined the Fania All-Stars and had a "hit" song with El Campesino (The Farmer). After spending some time with the Fania All-Stars, Rojas decided to form his own band the "Conjunto Borincano", but the venture was short-lived. In 1987 and 1989, he had hits with the salsa versions of the ballads Noche de Bodas (Wedding Night), and Quiereme Tal Como Soy (Love me the way I am). These were accomplished after he joined the "Puerto Rican Power" band.

In 1990, Rojas went solo and recorded Sensual (1990), Condename (1992), and A Mi Estilo (At My Style) (1994). Condename would garner Rojas his first Lo Nuestro nominations for Tropical Album of the Year and Tropical Male Artist of the Year in 1993. However, it was his 1995 recording Por Propio Derecho (On my own right), that placed Rojas on Latin Billboard's hit list. The album's lead single, "Esperándote" ("Waiting for You") became his first number-one hit on the Billboard Tropical Airplay chart and was nominated Tropical Song of the Year at the 1996 Lo Nuestro Awards. He gained the recognition he always wanted when he won the Paoli Prize for "Best Salsa Artist of the Year" and an "ACE" Award.

In 1996, Rojas had hits with Humildemente (Humbly) and Pal' Pueblo (For my town), he also released 20th Aniversario, Alegrias y Penas and Navidad con Tito in 1999. Alegrias y Penas contains the hit song, "Por Mujeres Como Tú" (originally recorded by Pepe Aguilar a year earlier), which became his second number-one hit on the Tropical Airplay chart and also earned him another nomination for Tropical Song of the Year at the 2000 Lo Nuestro Awards. The album itself was certified double platinum in the Latin field by the RIAA for selling 200,000 copies in the United States.

== Later years ==
In 2002, Rojas and his band performed and recorded "live" from Las Vegas, Nevada. The album is titled Tito Rojas Live: Autenticamente En Vivo with Roberto Roena as a special guest on the bongos. He released El Viajero in 2014. In 2015, Rojas appeared on Puerto Rican singer Ivy Queen's ninth studio album Vendetta. The album was split into four separate albums, one being an album composed entirely of only salsa music. On the salsa album, Rojas dueted with Queen on "Ella Se Hizo Deseo". Rojas was nominated for Latin Grammy Award for Best Salsa Album three times in his career for Rompiendo Noches, Quiero Llegar a la Casa, and Un Gallo Para la Historia (which was his last album to be released in his lifetime).|

On November 25, 2020, Tito Rojas - "El Gallo Salsero" last live performance was the featured singer on Norberto Vélez's YouTube channel titled "Sesiones Desde La Loma Ep. 14".

== Death ==
Rojas died on December 26, 2020, at the age of 65, after suffering a heart attack. He was buried at the Pax Christi Cemetery in Humacao, Puerto Rico.

== Discography ==
External audio
- You may listen to Tito Rojas' "A Ti Volvere" here.

- Aquí Empezó la Historia (1972)
- Con Amor (1978)
- Aquí (1979)
- Con Velo y Corona (1980)
- Tito Rojas (1981)
- El Campesino (1983)
- Todo Ha Cambiado (1984)
- Tres Mujeres (with Puerto Rican Power) (1987)
- Solo Con Un Beso (with Puerto Rican Power) (1988)
- Sensual (1990)
- Condéname (1992)
- A Mi Estilo (1993)
- Live Salsa Festival de Curazao (1994)
- Por Derecho Propio (1995)
- Humildemente (1996)
- Pa'l Pueblo (1997)
- Salsa Mixes y Más Mixes (1997)
- Alegrías y Penas (1999)
- Navidad Con Tito Rojas (1999)
- 20th Anniversary (1999)
- Rompiendo Noches (2000)
- Quiero Llegar a Casa (2001)
- Auténticamente En Vivo (2001)
- 10th Anniversary (2002)
- Canta el Gallo (2003)
- El de Siempre (2003)
- Perseverencia (2003)
- Doble Platino (2003)
- Tradicional (2004)
- Borrón y Cuenta Nueva (2005)
- Mejor Que Siempre (2006)
- Éxitos y Más (2007)
- Sin Comentarios (2007)
- Solamente Éxitos (2009)
- Vida (2010)
- Independiente (2011)
- El Viajero (2014)
- Tito Rojas (2018)
- Un Gallo Para La Historia (2019)

== Billboard charts ==
Adapted from Billboard.

- 1991 Siempre Seré (HLS #32) (Tropical #35)
- 1992 Condename a Tu Amor (HLS #12)
- 1992 Porque Este Amor (HLS #27) (Tropical #30)
- 1992 Nadie Es Eterno (HLS #38) (Tropical #35)
- 1992 Señora (HLS #36)
- 1994 Enamoramé (HLS #21)
- 1994 Señora de Madrugada (HLS #31)
- 1994 Lo Que Te Queda (HLS #20)
- 1994 He Chocado con la Vida (Tropical #6)
- 1995 También Nos Duéle (Tropical #4)
- 1995 Esperandote (HLS #12) (Tropical #1)
- 1995 Lloraré (HLS #38) (Tropical #7)
- 1996 Te Quedaras Conmigo (Tropical #12)
- 1996 Claro (Tropical #7)
- 1996 Amigo (HLS #22) (Tropical #3)
- 1997 Estoy de Tu Parte (Tropical #4)
- 1997 Quiero Hacerte el Amor (Tropical #9)
- 1997 Por Esa Mujer (Tropical #13)
- 1999 Por Mujeres Como Tú (HLS #3) (Tropical #1)
- 1999 Seré, Seré (Tropical #17)
- 2000 Cantemos Todos Cantemos (Tropical #12)
- 2000 Que Más Tu Quieres de Mí (HLS #29) (Tropical #9)
- 2000 El Amor Que Tú Me Das (Tropical #31)
- 2001 La Gente Dice (Tropical #26)
- 2001 Que Te Vaya Bonito (Tropical #39)
- 2001 Cómo Tú (Tropical #27)
- 2002 Te Lo Pido Señor (HLS #24) (Tropical #2)
- 2002 Cuanto Te Quiero (Tropical #29)
- 2003 Despues de Dios, Las Mujeres (Tropical #21)
- 2003 Cuidala (Tropical #5)
- 2004 El Gallo No Olvida (Tropical #13)
- 2004 El No Es Mejor Que Yo (Tropical #16)
- 2004 Hazmelo Otra Vez (Tropical #26)
- 2005 Quiero (HLS #47) (Tropical #4)
- 2005 Todita Tú (Tropical #31)
- 2005 Si Tú Te Vas (Quién Me Va a Querer) (Tropical #19)
- 2006 Yo Soy el Malo (Tropical #16)
- 2006 Si Me Falta Tú (Tropical #19)
- 2006 Si Me Pusieran a Elegir (Tropical #18)
- 2007 Las Quiero a las Dos (Dos Mujeres) (Tropical #31)
- 2007 Antes de Que Te Vayas (Tropical #12)
- 2007 Tiempos Navideños (Tropical #28)
- 2008 Digame Señora (Tropical #7)
- 2008 Amor del Bueno (Tropical #36)
- 2008 Enamorado (Tropical #32)
- 2011 Ese No Soy Yo (Tropical #27)
- 2011 No Me Digas No (Tropical #33)
- 2012 Maldito y Bendito Amor (feat. La India) (Tropical #28)
- 2019 Para Llorar (Tropical #14)
- 2019 Vivo Feliz (Tropical #24)
- 2020 Los Años No Pasan en Vaño (Tropical #11)
- 2020 Esto Tiene Que Acabar (Tropical #15)

== See also ==
- List of Puerto Ricans
