= Libre (Nino Bravo song) =

Single by Nino Bravo
- A-side: "Libre"
- B-side: "Vete"
- Released: 1972
- Genre: Ballad
- Length: 4:11
- Label: Polydor
- Songwriters: José Luis Armenteros, Pablo Herrero

"Libre" ("Free") is a song by José Luis Armenteros and Pablo Herrero, first performed and made popular by Spanish pop star Nino Bravo on his 1972 album Mi tierra. The song's lyrics tell of a young man who is "tired of dreaming" and yearns to fly "free like a bird that escaped its prison."

== Meaning ==
Contrary to popular belief, the song was not inspired by the death of Peter Fechter, who was killed while trying to cross the Berlin Wall in 1962. According to Pablo Herrero, one of the composers, it was inspired by the yearning for freedom during the dictatorship of Francisco Franco in Spain. However, Herrero recounts that when he heard of Fechter's story, he was astonished at how precisely it was mirrored in the song. Herrero said of the song:

It wasn't inspired by [the story of Peter Fechter]. It was less epic, much more domestic, less important. It was the product of a rebellion, of a generation that was born in Spain just after the war and which lived through the dictatorship and a harsh repression which lasted until 1975, the year of Franco's death. The song, however, is from 1972, when he was still alive. We didn't have to look to Germany. We were living it here. The lack of freedom was obvious.

A hit in Spain, it managed to climb the charts without censorship, as radio presenters circulated the Peter Fechter interpretation. As such, the song’s criticism of Francoism was ruled out and a certain affinity was projected between its message and the anti-communist ideology of the Spanish regime.

The song also became popular in much of Spanish-speaking Latin America, where it took on political overtones. It was banned under Fidel Castro's regime in Cuba, but in Chile, it was adopted as an anti-communist anthem and became popular among supporters of the military junta. The dictatorship that ensued later “appropriated” the song: it was performed in 1974 during the first post-coup edition of the Viña del Mar International Song Festival by Edmundo Arrocet, while Augusto Pinochet was in the audience. In 1976 the song was again performed at the Viña del Mar International Song Festival with Pinochet in the audience, this time by Juan Bau.

It was one of various songs reported to have been played as a backdrop during the torture of political prisoners during the military dictatorship in Chile.
