= Villarrubio =

Villarrubio, Spain
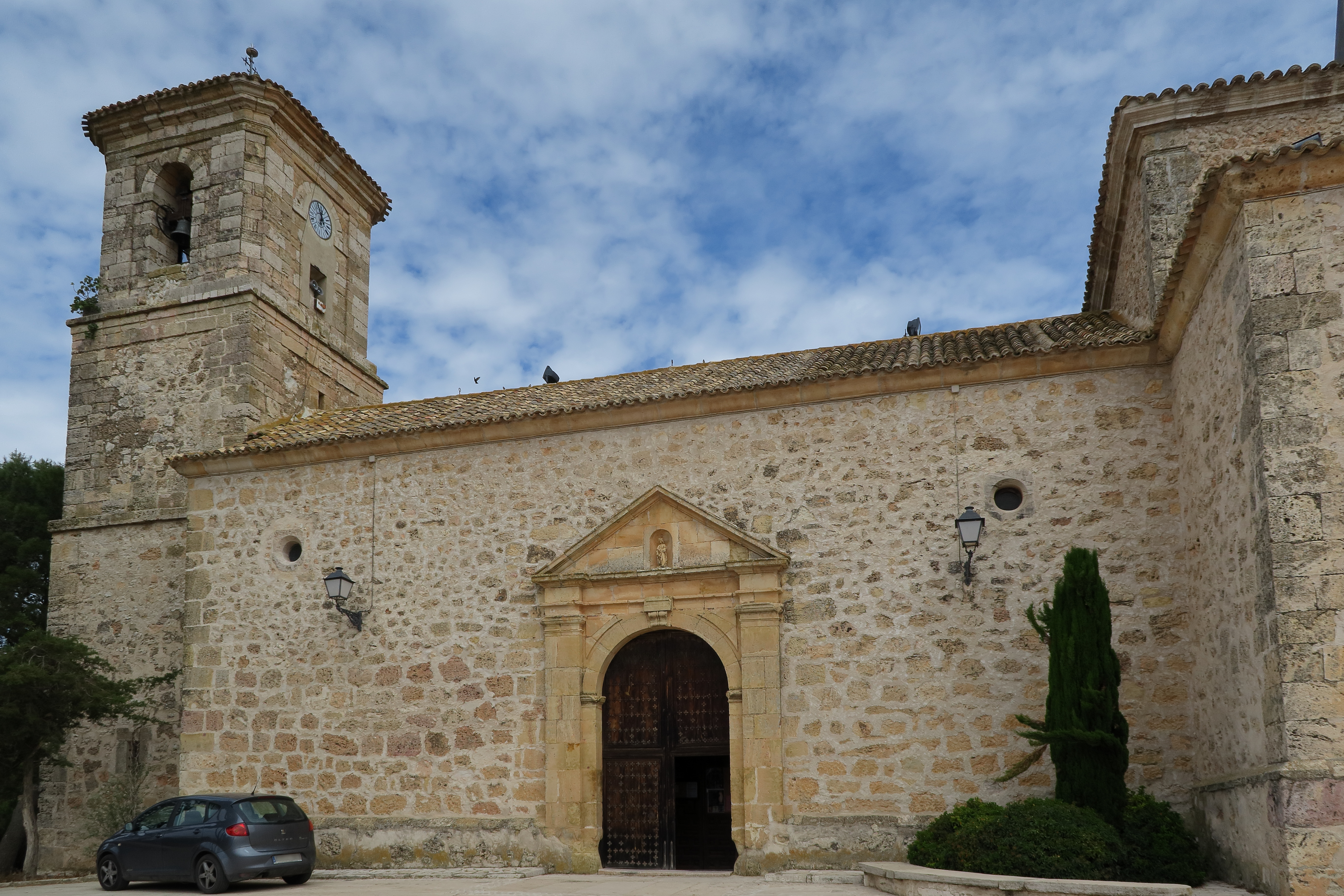
- Parish Church of Villarrubio

- Flag Coat of arms

- Location within Spain Location within Castilla-La Mancha
- Coordinates: 39°58′N 2°53′W
- Country: Spain
- Autonomous community: Castile-La Mancha
- Province: Cuenca
- Municipality: Villarrubio

Area
  - Total: 28 km^{2} (11 sq mi)

Population (2025-01-01)
  - Total: 211
  - Density: 7.5/km^{2} (20/sq mi)
- Time zone: UTC+1 (CET)
  - Summer (DST): UTC+2 (CEST)

Villarrubio is a municipality located in the province of Cuenca, Castile-La Mancha, Spain. According to the 2004 census (INE), the municipality has a population of 254 inhabitants.
