= Viva Puerto Rico Tour =

2014 concert tour by Ivy Queen

- National tour by Ivy Queen
- Promotional poster for the tour
- Location: North America
- Associated album: Musa
- Start date: January 28, 2014
- End date: March 2, 2014
- Legs: 1
- No. of shows: 13 in North America

Ivy Queen concert chronology
- "Drama Queen Club Tour"; "Viva Puerto Rico Tour"; Vendetta World Tour

The Viva Puerto Rico Tour was a tour performed by Puerto Rican recording artist Ivy Queen. In association with Score, Grande Entertainment, and Club Papi, the tour was launched on January 28, 2014.

The tour will include performances at various gay clubs in cities of the United States, such as New York, Orlando, Miami, Houston, Seattle, San Francisco, San Diego, Atlanta, Sacramento, and Los Angeles. Performances in Boston and Tampa have also been confirmed as well. A performance in Puerto Rico was not planned, however due to the tour's success, a performance in Ponce was announced. The tour also caused Ivy Queen's eighth studio album Musa (2012) to reenter the Billboard Latin Albums chart at number thirty-six for the week of February 9, 2014.

== Background ==
In 2008, Ivy Queen received an award from GLAAD for her support of the gay community. Ivy Queen headlined the Machete Music Tour 2010, which performed in cities such as New York and Los Angeles and featured "the hottest stars in reggaeton and Latin urban music", including Chino & Nacho, Flex, Jowell & Randy, Tego Calderon, Don Omar, Cosculluela, Angel & Khriz, J-King & Maximan and R.K.M & Ken-Y.

After the success of Queen's eighth studio album Musa which was nominated for Best Urban Music Album at the Latin Grammy Awards of 2013, it was announced in September 2013, that Queen had changed management and returned with Jorge "Goguito" Guadalupe, president and co-founder of Filtro Musik, to release her ninth studio album in February 2014. Following the birth of her first child, Queen then announced that she would embark on a U.S. tour entitled the "Viva Puerto Rico Tour".

== Setlist ==
- "12 Discípulos"
- "Cuando Las Mujeres"
- "Cupido"
- "Dime"
- "Dime Sí Recuerdas"
- "Jala Gatilo"
- "La Vida Es Así"
- "Menor Que Yo"
- "Muchos Quieren Tumbarme"
- "Never Leave You (Uh Oooh, Uh Oooh)"
- "Noche De Entierro (Nuestro Amor)"
- "Papi Te Quiero"
- "Peligro De Extinción"
- "Pobre Diabla"
- "Reggae Respect"
- "Sí Una Vez"
- "The Next Episode"
- "Te He Querido, Te He Llorado"
- "Que Lloren"
- "Quiero Bailar"
- "Quiero Saber"

== Synopsis ==
Tickets for the January 28 event were between $15 and $55. The age suitability was 21 and up, with the event beginning at nine at night. It was held at Score Nightclub in Miami, Florida. The next event, the January 30 event, was held at the Parliament House Nightclub. The doors were open from eight at night until three in the morning, however the concert did not begin until one in the morning.

Each event included a "VIP Meet and Greet Package. If you purchased the "VIP Meet and Great Package", then you received express entry into event, exclusive Meet and Greet with Queen, one free Ivy Queen CD, one personalized autograph, one picture taken with Queen and a complimentary Live at Club Papi CD.

== Tour dates ==
Date	City	Country	Venue
North America
January 28, 2014	Miami	United States	Score Nightclub
January 30, 2014	Orlando	United States	Parliament House Nightclub
January 31, 2014	Houston	United States	South Beach Nightclub
February 1, 2014	San Francisco	United States	Space 550
February 6, 2014	Chicago	United States	Circuit Nightclub
February 7, 2014	San Diego	United States	Rich's Nightclub
February 9, 2014	Seattle	United States	Neighbours Nightclub
February 14, 2014	Atlanta	United States	Rush Nightclub
February 15, 2014	Sacramento	United States	Faces Nightclub
February 16, 2014	Los Angeles	United States	Circus Disco Nightclub
February 21, 2014	New York City	United States	Stage 48
March 1, 2014	Ponce	Puerto Rico	Backstage
March 2, 2014	Tampa	United States	Honey Pot

=== Cancellations and rescheduled shows ===
N/A	Boston	United States	N/A	Cancelled due to unknown circumstances

=== Press conferences ===
January 14, 2014	Miami	United States	Score Nightclub	Tour announcement
February 12, 2014	Los Angeles	United States	The Conga Room
February 13, 2014	Los Angeles	United States	The Conga Room
