= Ácido Sabor =

Promotional single by Ricky Martin

from the EP Play
- Language: Spanish
- English title: "Sour Taste"
- Released: July 15, 2022
- Recorded: April 2022
- Genre: Latin pop; ballad; flamenco; bolero; urban pop
- Length: 3:30
- Label: Sony Latin
- Songwriters: Freddy Montalvo; Enrique Martin Morales; José Carlos Cruz; Isaac Ortiz Geronimo; Sébastien Julien Alfred
- Producer: Subelo NEO

Ricky Martin singles chronology
"Recuerdo" (2020)	"Ácido Sabor" (2022)

Music video
- "Ácido Sabor" on YouTube

"Ácido Sabor" (transl. "Sour Taste") is a song recorded by Puerto Rican singer Ricky Martin for Martin's second extended play, Play (2022). The song was written by Freddy Montalvo, Martin, José Carlos Cruz, Isaac Ortiz Geronimo, and Sébastien Julien Alfred, while the production was handled by Subelo NEO. It was released to Latin American radio stations by Sony Music Latin on July 15, 2022, as the only promotional single from the EP. A Spanish-language pop ballad that contains elements of flamenco, bolero, urban pop, acoustic, electronic, and reggaeton. it is a romantic song "filled with many contradictions like life" that "represents finding love" and the singer himself.

"Ácido Sabor" received widely positive reviews from music critics, who complimented its rhythm and "heartfelt" lyrics. The accompanying music video was directed by Carlos Perez. It depicts Martin as a bullfighter and contains several religious references.

== Background and release ==
Ricky Martin started recording his eleventh studio album, initially titled Movimiento, in the second half of 2019, inspired by the 2019 political protests in Puerto Rico. While, because of the COVID-19 pandemic and subsequent personal experiences, Martin decided to split the album Movimiento into the two EPs Pausa and Play. He released Pausa in May 2020. "Ácido Sabor" was included as the first track on his second EP Play, released July 13, 2022. Following Martin's meeting with the production team SubeloNEO in April 2022, which led to a studio session to compose "Ácido Sabor", it became the last track that he recorded for the EP. During an interview with Billboard, the singer explained:

It's incredible. You never know what’s going to happen in the creative process. I went to the studio with Subelo Neo and iZaak, and we let the ideas flow. I thought a party song was going to be born, but apparently not.

Sony Music Latin released "Ácido Sabor" to Latin American radio stations on July 15, 2022, as the only promotional single from Play. An "Orbital Audio" version of the song was included as the first track on the Orbital Audio version of the EP, released simultaneously with the original.

== Music and lyrics ==
"Ácido Sabor"
A 21-second sample of the song's chorus, which features "a dancing and melancholic" melody.

Musically, "Ácido Sabor" is a Spanish-language pop ballad that contains elements of flamenco, bolero, urban pop, acoustic, electronic, and reggaeton. It was written by Freddy Montalvo, Martin, José Carlos Cruz, Isaac Ortiz Geronimo, and Sébastien Julien Alfred. The production was handled by Subelo NEO, and the track runs for a total of 3 minutes and 30 seconds. Lyrically, "Ácido Sabor", which translates to "Sour Taste" in English, is a romantic song "filled with many contradictions like life" that "represents finding love" and the singer himself, with lyrics including, "Peligroso / Tal vez todo se sienta dulce, pero es doloroso / Agarro tu mano, camino y me siento grandioso / No tengo alas / Pero tú me haces volar, eh" (Dangerous / It may all feel sweet, but it's painful / I hold your hand, I walk and I feel great / I don't have wings / But you make me fly, huh).

== Critical reception ==
Upon release, "Ácido Sabor" was met with widely positive reviews from music critics. Jessica Roiz from Billboard described the song as a "very heartfelt track" with an "innovative rhythm". Also from Billboard, Griselda Flores highlighted it among the "pop gems" of Play. An author of Marca called the song "[a] hit", while Latina's Lucas Villa labeled it "seriously sexy". A writer of Happyfm gave "Ácido Sabor" a positive review, describing it as an "amazing song", commenting that Martin "has always shown to have enormous talent" and "always knows how to leave us speechless".

== Music video ==
A screenshot from the music video, depicting Martin in a temple.

On June 27, 2022, Martin shared a photo of himself in action, revealing that it would be for his next music video, with the caption: "In this photo, a little tease of what the video of my next single is going feel like." Almost two weeks later, on July 13, he announced that the video for "Ácido Sabor" would be released "soon". The music video was released on July 14, 2022. It was directed by Carlos Perez, who had previously directed the videos for Martin's singles "Tal Vez", "Jaleo", "The Best Thing About Me Is You", "Frío", "Come with Me", "Perdóname", "Fiebre", "Falta Amor", "Tiburones (Remix)", "Recuerdo", and "Canción Bonita. Martin portrays a bullfighter in the visual, which contains some religious references and bullfighting. It depicts Martin in a confessional that seems to be inside a temple. In other parts of the video, he is shown in a symbolic battle against himself. A phrase appears in the end of the video: "La incertidumbre de un conflicto se desvanece con el poder de la integridad" (The uncertainty of a conflict it vanishes with the power of integrity). The music video was nominated for Favorite Video at the 2022 Buenos Aires Music Video Festival.

== Credits and personnel ==
Credits adapted from Tidal.

- Ricky Martin – vocal, composer, lyricist, associated performer
- Subelo NEO – producer
- Freddy Montalvo – composer, lyricist, recording engineer
- José Carlos Cruz – composer, lyricist, recording engineer
- Isaac Ortiz Geronimo – composer, lyricist
- Sébastien Julien Alfred – composer, lyricist
- Jaycen Joshua – mastering engineer, mixing engineer
- Jean Rodríguez – recording engineer, vocal producer
- Gaby Vilar – A&R coordinator
- Izzy De Jesús – A&R director

== Charts ==
=== Weekly charts ===
Weekly peak performance for "Ácido Sabor"
Chart (2022)	Peak position
Ecuador Pop (Monitor Latino)	19
Puerto Rico (Monitor Latino)	12
US Latin Airplay (Billboard)	45
US Latin Pop Airplay (Billboard)	7

=== Year-end charts ===
2022 year-end chart performance for "Ácido Sabor"
Chart (2022)	Position
Argentina Latino (Monitor Latino)	82
Bolivia (Monitor Latino)	93
Puerto Rico (Monitor Latino)	87

2023 year-end chart performance for "Ácido Sabor"
Chart (2023)	Position
Argentina (Monitor Latino)	52
Bolivia (Monitor Latino)	54
Panama Pop (Monitor Latino)	62
Puerto Rico Pop (Monitor Latino)	54
Uruguay (Monitor Latino)	92

== Release history ==
Release dates and formats for "Ácido Sabor"
Region	Date	Format(s)	Label	Ref.
Latin America	July 15, 2022	Contemporary hit radio	Sony Music Latin	
