= Canción Bonita =

2021 single by Carlos Vives and Ricky Martin

Single by Carlos Vives and Ricky Martin

from the album Cumbiana II
- Language: Spanish
- English title: "Pretty Song"
- Released: April 13, 2021
- Recorded: 2020
- Genre: Vallenato; pop
- Length: 2:49
- Label: Sony Latin
- Songwriters: Andrés Torres; Rafa Arcaute; Ricky Martin; Carlos Vives; Mauricio Rengifo
- Producers: Torres; Rengifo; Arcaute

Carlos Vives singles chronology
"Tambores" (2021)	"Canción Bonita" (2021)	"Soy Cordobés" (2021)

Ricky Martin singles chronology
"Falta Amor" (2020)	"Canción Bonita" (2021)	"Qué Rico Fuera" (2021)

Music video
- "Canción Bonita" on YouTube

"Canción Bonita" (transl. "Pretty Song") is a song recorded by Colombian singer Carlos Vives and Puerto Rican singer Ricky Martin for Vives' sixteenth studio album, Cumbiana II. It was written by Andrés Torres, Rafa Arcaute, Martin, Vives, and Mauricio Rengifo, while the production was handled by Torres, Rengifo and Arcaute. The song was released for digital download and streaming by Sony Music Latin on April 13, 2021, as the lead single from the album. A Spanish language vallenato and pop song, it is a declaration of love for Puerto Rico. The track received widely positive reviews from music critics, who complimented its fusion of sounds.

"Canción Bonita" was nominated for Song of the Year and Best Pop Song at the 22nd Annual Latin Grammy Awards. The song was commercially successful in Latin America, reaching number one in 12 countries, including Argentina, Chile, and Colombia. It was certified platinum in Spain and Latin quadruple platinum in the United States. The track made Martin the first male Latin artist in history to have 4 songs from different decades to have over 100 million streams on Spotify.

An accompanying music video, released simultaneously with the song, was directed by Puerto Rican director Carlos Perez and filmed in Old San Juan. To promote the song, Vives and Martin performed it at the 2021 Latin American Music Awards. For further promotion, Spotify promoted the release with billboards in Times Square.

== Background and release ==
In December 2019, Vives and Martin participated in a charity gala together with actress and producer Eva Longoria, and Vives said that he had anticipated recording a song with Martin. Finally, they had made plans to work together on a song and it was nearly finished when the coronavirus pandemic happened and although it was recorded in early 2020, the pandemic prevented the release. In an interview with Billboard, Martin told the magazine: "It was a lively track, but we decided not to release it at that time."

On February 11, 2021, Primera Hora reported that Martin and Vives had recorded a song together and were seen in Piñones and El Escambrón, filming a music video. Four days later, Guacamouly published several photos of the two artists on the set of filming. The photos showed Martin wearing a black T-shirt, black sneakers, and denim jeans, with a military print mask, and the two danced to the rhythm of the music. On February 17, 2021, it was announced that the song is dedicated to the victims of the 2016 Orlando nightclub shooting. On March 25, 2021, Billboard confirmed that Vives and Martin were set to perform at the 2021 Latin American Music Awards. Vives told People about "Canción Bonita":

Working on such a meaningful song with Ricky was a great experience. In 1987, he was wrapping up his time with Menudo and stepping into his solo career. We saw each other often back then and really got to know one another.

Also, Martin told Hola News about the song: "Carlos' love for Puerto Rico is genuine and this gives an authentic value to the lyrics." On April 12, 2021, Vives and Martin revealed the song's title as "Canción Bonita", shared the artwork, and announced that it would be released the following day. The song was released for digital download and streaming by Sony Music Latin on April 13, 2021, as the lead single from Vives' sixteenth studio album, Cumbiana II, marking the first collaboration between Vives and Martin. "Canción Bonita" was included as the sixth track on the album, released May 13, 2022.

== Music and lyrics ==
"Canción Bonita"
A 15-second sample of the song's chorus, which features Colombian and Puerto Rican sounds.

Musically, "Canción Bonita" is a Spanish language vallenato and pop song, written by Colombian record producer and musician Andrés Torres, Argentine musician Rafa Arcaute, Martin, Vives, and Colombian musician Mauricio Rengifo. Its production was handled by Torres, Rengifo, and Arcaute, and the song runs for a total of 2 minutes and 49 seconds. The song combines musical styles from Colombia and Puerto Rico, with it featuring Vives' tropical sounds and Martin's Puerto Rican beats. Lucas Villa from mitú analyzed that the song is where "[a] bit of vallenato from Vives' Colombia meets the reggaeton-pop of Martin's Puerto Rico", and an author of Los 40 said it "is not only romantic, but also has a rhythm that will make you dance". Writing for Monitor Latino, Josh Mendez stated that the song "mixes vallenato, with a very light rhythmic base of the urban genre, and in some moments there are also hints of other Latin rhythms".

Lyrically, "Canción Bonita" which translates to "Pretty Song" in English, is a declaration of love for Puerto Rico, and serves as a true celebration of the island and a love letter to it. The track was described as "happy" and a "party song". The lyrics mix the desire to start over with that of the summer and become synonymous with dance. The desire to travel to exotic and colorful places is also emphasized, and Puerto Rico is the preferred destination of this trip with lyrics including, "Y si tengo que escoger / Me quedo, me quedo contigo / Y si yo vuelvo a San Juan / Yo bailo, yo bailo contigo" (And if I have to choose / I stay, I stay with you / And if I go back to San Juan / I dance, I dance with you). Additionally, it is about the moment when the special person arrives and you know that it is with them that you want to risk your life, you would choose the same person a thousand times to spend the rest of your days, and in general, you know you are with the right person. It talks about how incredible it is to find your soulmate in the same person every day.

== Critical reception ==
Upon release, "Canción Bonita" was met with universal acclaim from music critics. Leila Cobo from Billboard gave the song a positive review, saying: "A lilting, danceable track that celebrates Vives' Colombian and Martin's Puerto Rican roots, it's an invitation to celebrate, and it's a celebration of Puerto Rico, down to the video shot in Old San Juan." She also described the track as "joyful" and "stellar". Also from Billboard, Griselda Flores complimented the track, labeling it "[an] uplifting anthem". An author of RCN Televisión called the track "a song full of love, joy, flavor and friendship". In his review for Mitú, Lucas Villa said that like it is suggested by the song's title, "this collaboration lives up to its name with both superstars singing the most beautiful lyrics about the island. These Latin pop titans give a soaring performance that can carry their lovely message to the higher heavens." Writing for People, Tomás Mier praised "Canción Bonita", saying it is a "perfect mix of Martin's pop feel and Vives' unmistakable tropical sounds". He also described it as "the perfect introduction to a post-pandemic life where listeners can move their hips and dance to the music". BeLatina staff described the track as "a joyous, wholesome, and sunshiney song that makes you happy".

An author of La Nación wrote, "Ricky Martin and Carlos Vives joined their talents in 'Canción Bonita'." He added: "In this new musical adventure, the consecrated voices of Latin music embody a powerful encounter of sounds typical of Colombia and Puerto Rico in a single song." Los 40's Naomi Fernandez gave the song a positive review, saying it is "a Latin proposal, soft, danceable and full of good energy in which the tropical sounds of Carlos Vives are mixed with the more pop sound of Ricky Martin". Aitana Alonso from Cadena Dial acclaimed the energies of the two artists together that "couldn't be more positive" and described the single as "a Caribbean theme that invites us to dance and wear out all the joy in our body". Also from Cadena Dial, Noelia Bertol ranked it as one of "Ricky Martin six collaborations that have us moving the skeleton", labeled it "[a] very powerful collaboration", and said that it's "not only beautiful but also catchy". In another article, she listed the track among his ten "songs that brighten up summers". Monitor Latino's Josh Mendez celebrated the song's "strong impact", saying it "will make those who listen to dance and enjoy". In another article, he stated: "This urban-vallenato production is happy, pleasant to the ear and quite danceable." Also from Monitor Latino, Alpha González labeled it "a song with a particular rhythm and catchy lyrics" and stated that "a lot of people used it to set the mood for their vacations".

=== Accolades ===
Amazon Music ranked "Canción Bonita" as the 33rd Best Latin song of the year, and Spotify ranked it as one of the Best Spanish Pop Songs of 2021. "Canción Bonita" was nominated for Song of the Year and Best Pop Song at the 22nd Annual Latin Grammy Awards. The track was nominated for Song of the Year at the 2021 Joya awards. It was also nominated for the Perfect Mix of the Year and Tropical Song of the Year at the 34th Annual Premio Lo Nuestro, and was acknowledged as an award-winning song at the 2022 ASCAP Latin Awards.

== Commercial performance ==
"Canción Bonita" debuted at number 45 on the US Hot Latin Songs chart after just two days and five hours of tracking, becoming Vives' 27th entry on the chart, and Martin's 50th. The following week it climbed to its peak at number 23. It also peaked at number 24 on the US Latin Airplay chart, number 5 on the Latin Pop Airplay chart, and number one on the US Latin Digital Song Sales chart, becoming Vives' second and Martin's third number-one hit on the last chart. The song also extended Martin's own record as the artist with most top 20s on the US Latin Pop Airplay chart, with 50 songs, and became his 39th top-10 hit on the chart, making him the second artist in history to achieve this milestone. It was certified Latin quadruple platinum by the Recording Industry Association of America (RIAA), for track-equivalent sales of over 240,000 units in the United States.

In Latin America, "Canción Bonita" experienced huge commercial success, reaching number one in 12 countries and "breaking the charts during the summer" of 2021. The song spent eight consecutive weeks at number one in Chile and topped the country's year-end chart. In Colombia, it reached number one on both the Monitor Latino and National-Report charts, staying at the top for eight consecutive weeks on the former. It further peaked at number one in Argentina, Bolivia, Costa Rica, Ecuador, El Salvador, Honduras, Latin America, Panama, Paraguay, Puerto Rico, and Uruguay. Additionally, it reached the top 10 in Guatemala, Mexico, and Venezuela. The track was later ranked as the best-performing song of 2021 in Ecuador, as well as ranking among the top 10 best-performing songs in Argentina, Colombia, Latin America, Panama, and Puerto Rico, marking both artists' first top 10 on Monitor Latino's Latin American year-end chart. Although "Canción Bonita" never appeared on Nicaragua general chart, it peaked at number four on the country's pop chart and spent over 52 weeks on the list. In 2022, the song was certified gold by the Asociación Mexicana de Productores de Fonogramas y Videogramas (AMPROFON), for track-equivalent sales of over 70,000 units in Mexico.

In Spain, the single peaked at number 41 and although it didn't hit the top 40, it spent a total of 28 weeks on the chart, becoming Vives' third longest-charting hit and Martin's fourth. The song was certified double platinum by the Productores de Música de España (Promusicae), for track-equivalent sales of over 120,000 units. "Canción Bonita" was also one of the Songs of the Summer in Spain in 2021. The song gained more popularity following its TikTok challenge; it starts with placing a pet or a child between two people. Then, the two people run in opposite directions and see who is followed by the pet or child. The song has been used in over 900,000 videos on the platform, becoming one of the most popular songs of 2021. In December 2021, the song reached 100 million streams on Spotify, making Martin the first male Latin artist in history to have 4 songs from different decades to have over 100 million streams on the platform.

== Promotion ==
A screenshot from the music video, depicting Vives and Martin dancing on the beach.

On April 12, 2021, Vives and Martin shared snippets of the accompanying music video and announced that it would be released the following day. The visual was released alongside the song on the specified date. The video was filmed at different locations in Old San Juan, such as Piñones, El Escambrón, and El Batey, which fully represent Puerto Rico's aesthetics, culture, and history. It was directed by Carlos Perez, who had previously directed the videos for Martin's singles "Tal Vez", "Jaleo", "The Best Thing About Me Is You", "Frío", "Come with Me", "Perdóname", "Fiebre", and his 2020 songs, "Falta Amor", "Tiburones (Remix)", and "Recuerdo". Beach and palm tree scenes appear in the video to make the audience feel the rhythm of summer. MTV News praised the "bright colors, contagious energy and positive vibes" that emerge from the video. The music video was nominated for Best Pop Video at the 2021 Premios Quiero. Vives and Martin gave their first live performance of "Canción Bonita" at the 2021 Latin American Music Awards on April 15, 2021. As of March 2022, the video has received over 100 million views on YouTube. For further promotion, Spotify promoted the song on billboards in Times Square.

== Cover versions and media usage ==
Fernanda Hansen performed "Canción Bonita" as Panda on the second season of the Chilean singing competition television series ¿Quién es la máscara? in 2021. In the same year, dog (Pancho Barraza) delivered a performance of the song on the special program of the Mexican series ¿Quién es la máscara?, as part of Teletón 2021. "Canción Bonita" was featured in the Chilean telenovela Pobre novio (2021).

== Track listing ==
Digital download / streaming
No.	Title	Length
1.	"Canción Bonita"	2:49

== Credits and personnel ==
Credits adapted from Tidal.

- Carlos Vives – vocal, composer, lyricist, associated performer
- Ricky Martin – vocal, composer, lyricist, associated performer
- Andrés Torres – composer, lyricist, producer, acoustic guitar, electric guitar, keyboards, recording engineer
- Rafa Arcaute – composer, lyricist, producer, A&R director, keyboards, recording engineer
- Mauricio Rengifo – composer, lyricist, producer, background vocal, keyboards, recording engineer
- Miche Molina – accordion
- Andrés Leal – acoustic guitar, keyboards
- Oriana Hidalgo – A&R coordinator
- Isabel De Jesús – A&R director
- Mayte Montero – bagpipe
- Martín Velilla – keyboards
- Tom Norris – mastering engineer, mixing engineer
- Enrique Larreal – recording engineer
- Jean Rodríguez – recording engineer

== Charts ==
=== Weekly charts ===
Weekly peak performance for "Canción Bonita"
Chart (2021–2022)	Peak position
Argentina Hot 100 (Billboard)	25
Argentina (Monitor Latino)	1
Bolivia (Monitor Latino)	1
Chile (Monitor Latino)	1
Colombia (Monitor Latino)	1
Colombia (National-Report)	1
Costa Rica (Monitor Latino)	1
Dominican Republic (Monitor Latino)	18
Ecuador (Monitor Latino)	1
El Salvador (Monitor Latino)	1
Guatemala (Monitor Latino)	3
Honduras (Monitor Latino)	1
Latin America (Monitor Latino)	1
Mexico (Billboard Mexican Airplay)	11
Mexico (Monitor Latino)	4
Nicaragua Pop (Monitor Latino)	4
Panama (Monitor Latino)	1
Panama (PRODUCE)	1
Paraguay (Monitor Latino)	1
Peru Streaming (UNIMPRO)	33
Peru Pop (Monitor Latino)	4
Puerto Rico (Monitor Latino)	1
Spain (Promusicae)	41
Uruguay (Monitor Latino)	1
US Hot Latin Songs (Billboard)	23
US Latin Airplay (Billboard)	24
US Latin Pop Airplay (Billboard)	5
Venezuela (Monitor Latino)	6

=== Monthly charts ===
Monthly chart position for "Canción Bonita"
Chart (2021)	Peak position
Paraguay (SGP)	24

=== Year-end charts ===
2021 year-end chart performance for "Canción Bonita"
Chart (2021)	Position
Argentina (Monitor Latino)	5
Bolivia (Monitor Latino)	11
Chile (Monitor Latino)	1
Colombia (Monitor Latino)	6
Costa Rica (Monitor Latino)	12
Dominican Republic (Monitor Latino)	74
Ecuador (Monitor Latino)	1
El Salvador (Monitor Latino)	21
Guatemala (Monitor Latino)	55
Honduras (Monitor Latino)	11
Latin America (Monitor Latino)	9
Mexico (Monitor Latino)	96
Nicaragua Pop (Monitor Latino)	15
Panama (Monitor Latino)	2
Paraguay (Monitor Latino)	34
Peru Pop (Monitor Latino)	21
Puerto Rico (Monitor Latino)	9
Spain (PROMUSICAE)	87
Uruguay (Monitor Latino)	22
US Hot Latin Songs (Billboard)	98
US Latin Pop Airplay (Billboard)	19
Venezuela (Monitor Latino)	15

2022 year-end chart performance for "Canción Bonita"
Chart (2022)	Position
Chile Pop (Monitor Latino)	38
Ecuador (Monitor Latino)	35
El Salvador (Monitor Latino)	63
Honduras Pop (Monitor Latino)	52
Nicaragua (Monitor Latino)	75
Panama (Monitor Latino)	74
Paraguay Pop (Monitor Latino)	54
Puerto Rico Pop (Monitor Latino)	99
Peru Pop (Monitor Latino)	96
Venezuela Pop (Monitor Latino)	34

2023 year-end chart performance for "Canción Bonita"
Chart (2023)	Position
Ecuador (Monitor Latino)	58
Honduras Pop (Monitor Latino)	77
Nicaragua Pop (Monitor Latino)	33
Panama Pop (Monitor Latino)	28
Venezuela Pop (Monitor Latino)	90

== Certifications ==
Certifications and sales for "Canción Bonita"
Region	Certification	Certified units/sales
Mexico (AMPROFON)	Gold	70,000^{‡}
Spain (Promusicae)	2× Platinum	120,000^{‡}
United States (RIAA)	7× Platinum (Latin)	420,000^{‡}
Streaming
Central America (CFC)	Platinum	7,000,000^{†}
^{‡} Sales+streaming figures based on certification alone.^{†} Streaming-only figures based on certification alone.

== Release history ==
Release dates and formats for "Canción Bonita"
Region	Date	Format(s)	Label	Ref.
Various	April 13, 2021	Digital download; streaming	Sony Music Latin	
Latin America	April 14, 2021	Contemporary hit radio	Sony Music Latin	

== See also ==
- List of airplay number-one hits in Argentina
- List of number-one songs of 2021 (Bolivia)
- List of number-one songs of 2021 (Chile)
- List of number-one songs of 2021 (Panama)
