= Recuerdo (song) =

2020 song by Ricky Martin & Carla Morrison

Promotional single by Ricky Martin and Carla Morrison

from the EP Pausa
- Language: Spanish
- English title: "Memory"
- Released: July 23, 2020
- Recorded: 2020
- Genre: Pop
- Length: 3:52
- Label: Sony Latin
- Songwriters: Carla Patricia Morrison Flores; Demián Jiménez; Ricky Martin; Chiara Stroia; Alejandro Jiménez
- Producers: Demián Jiménez; Alejandro Jiménez

Ricky Martin Promotional singles chronology
"Shine" (2011)	"Recuerdo" (2020)	"Ácido Sabor" (2022)

Music video
- "Recuerdo" on YouTube

"Recuerdo" (transl. "Memory") is a song recorded by Puerto Rican singer Ricky Martin with Mexican singer Carla Morrison for Martin's first extended play, Pausa (2020). The song was written by Morrison, Demián Jiménez, Martin, Chiara Stroia, and Alejandro Jiménez, while the production was handled by Demián and Alejandro Jiménez. It was released to Latin American radio stations by Sony Music Latin on July 23, 2020, as the only promotional single from the EP. A Spanish language ballad and pop song, it calls for an introspection of the mind and soul, and throughout it they sing of the aching longing for a lost love.

"Recuerdo" received widely positive reviews from music critics, who complimented its lyrics, production, and their complementary vocal styles. It was ranked as one of the "15 Best Female-Male Latin Collaborations of 2020" by Billboard. The song reached the top 10 in Martin's native Puerto Rico, and the top 15 on the US Latin Pop Airplay chart. It was also certified gold in Mexico. The accompanying music video was directed by Carlos Perez. To promote the song, Martin and Morrison performed it on several television programs and award shows, including the 2020 Latin Grammy Awards.

== Background and release ==
Martin started recording his eleventh studio album, initially titled Movimiento, in the second half of 2019, inspired by the 2019 political protests in Puerto Rico. On October 29, 2019, during an interview with Entertainment Weekly, he confirmed that the album was set to include three ballads. Because of the COVID-19 pandemic and subsequent personal experiences, Martin decided to split the album Movimiento into the two EPs Pausa and Play. "Recuerdo" was included as the second track on his debut EP Pausa, released May 28, 2020.

During an interview with Billboard, Martin told the magazine: "I'm obsessed with Carlita's voice and I'm obsessed with the way she tells a story. So, I called her. Initially, she thought I was asking her to write a song for my album and I said, 'No, I want to sing with you'." Morrison was minutes away from getting on to perform in a festival, when her manager asked her to sit down because she had very important news to give her. She screamed "like crazy" and then was shocked because she couldn't believe it: her longtime idol was not only interested in her music, but also wanted to work with her. They started planning and agreed to talk again to continue with the creation process. In an interview with Quién, she said: "For a while it didn't mark me and I honestly thought it had been completely canceled." But finally, a month later, Martin called her. She recalled: "It felt amazing. It was like a dream and I still can't believe it." Then the songwriting process finally began for Morrison: "He told me he was looking for a ballad, he told me things he was going through and that made it very easy because Ricky is very communicative, very humble and human. At times I forgot it was him." She wrote three songs, but in the end she only sent him two because she felt they were the closest thing to what he would like: "He loved them both, but chose 'Recuerdo'." During an interview with El Universal, Morrison told the newspaper about Martin:

Ricky is such a wonderful, caring and professional being that it motivated me to indulge in the song in a way that I found sexy, beautiful and classic. I think he also demonstrates all of that with ease, but combined with the essence of Ricky in the present and future.

On June 23, 2020, an accompanying lyric video was released on Martin's YouTube channel. Sony Music Latin released "Recuerdo" to Latin American radio stations on July 23, 2020, as the only promotional single from Pausa. It marked the first collaboration between Martin and Morrison. A headphone mix of the song, created using "Orbital Audio" technology, was included as the sixth track on the headphone mix version of the EP, released July 30, 2020.

== Music and lyrics ==
"Recuerdo"
A 15-second sample of the chorus, which features a "chill" and "relaxed" melody.

Musically, "Recuerdo" is a Spanish language ballad and pop song, written by Morrison, Demián Jiménez, Martin, Chiara Stroia, and Alejandro Jiménez. Its production was handled by Demián and Alejandro Jiménez, and the song features elements of R&B. The track runs for a total of 3 minutes and 52 seconds. Lyrically, "Recuerdo" which translates to "Memory" in English, calls for an introspection of the mind and soul, and throughout it they sing of the aching longing for a lost love. The "heart-wrenching" and "emotional" lyrics include: "Vengo a ti, confieso / Cada emoción latiendo / Esto me impide respirar / Ya no puedo / Me perdí en tu cuerpo / Cada rincón secreto / De ti no tengo saciedad / Son tus besos" ("I come to you, I confess / Every emotion beating / This prevents me from breathing / I can't anymore / I got lost in your body / Every secret corner of you / I have no satiety / They are your kisses"). In an interview with Billboard, Martin told the magazine about the composition: "This is a special song and it's born out of the sadness I was feeling. Carla was also going through a rough moment and we had this urge to write again. We wanted to make sure that we each didn't lose our essence when creating this fusion and it was born very organically."

== Critical reception ==
Upon release, "Recuerdo" was met with widely positive reviews from music critics. Billboard staff ranked it as one of the "15 Best Female-Male Latin Collaborations of 2020" and stated: "This is the collaboration we didn't know we needed in 2020. 'Recuerdo' is one of the most beautiful ballads released this year thanks to its heart-wrenching lyrics that call for introspection of the mind and soul." Remezcla's Jhoni Jackson gave the song a positive review, saying it "is one of those soaring numbers that hits you in the feels, no matter how thick your emotional shield may be. The pairing itself a surprise, listeners get a more significant jolt when hearing how well the twosome’s voices, manipulated just so, blend for many a shiver-inducing moment". She also labeled its chorus "a universally understood expelling of emotion that feels like the warmest embrace - maybe from someone you loved, whose hugs you physically miss".

Elias Leight from Rolling Stone called its production "hollow" and "snapping", saying: "The beat stays unwaveringly skeletal as the vocal fireworks get increasingly ornate." He continued to praise Martin and Morrison's "complementary vocal styles" and emphasized that the track "seems expertly designed for a performance at a future awards show, probably with a full choir - a cavernous space where onstage drama can heighten the emotion of the lyrics". Idolator's Mike Wass named it "a highlight" of Pausa, and Iris Gálvez from Diario Co Latino labeled it "[a] magical collaboration". Carlos Rerucha from Cadena Dial described Martin and Morrison as "a duo that adds that extra sweetness to some verses that break and recompose you at the same time, investigating the deepest secrets of our hearts". YouTube Music placed the song on their "Top Latin Pop 2020" playlist.

== Commercial performance ==
"Recuerdo" debuted at number 35 on the US Latin Pop Airplay chart on August 8, 2020, becoming Martin's 51st entry on the chart and Morrison's first. The following week, Billboard revised the methodology for the Latin Pop Airplay chart to track Latin pop songs being played on Latin radio stations in the country as opposed to most-played songs on Latin pop radio stations. As a result, it climbed to its peak of number 12, extending Martin's own record as the artist with most top 20s on the chart, with 48 songs. The song also peaked at number 15 on the US Latin Pop Digital Song Sales chart. In Puerto Rico, it debuted at number nine on the chart issue dated July 27, 2020, giving Martin his third top 10 hit from Pausa in his native, following "Cántalo" and "Tiburones". In 2021, "Recuerdo" was certified gold by the Asociación Mexicana de Productores de Fonogramas y Videogramas (AMPROFON), for track-equivalent sales of over 30,000 units in Mexico.

== Promotion ==
=== Music video ===
A screenshot from the music video, depicting Martin singing the song in a room full of candles.

On June 24, 2020, Martin shared a photo of himself on the set of filming "Recuerdo" music video, announcing that it would be released "soon". Almost four weeks later, on July 21, he shared snippets of the visual on Instagram, letting his followers know that it is set for release on July 23, 2020. The black-and-white video was released simultaneously with the song's release as a promotional single on the specified date. It was filmed in compliance with the physical distance measures due to COVID-19 pandemic restrictions, and Martin recorded his scenes in Los Angeles, while Morrison's were shot in Paris. It was directed by Carlos Perez, who had previously directed the videos for Martin's singles "Tal Vez", "Jaleo", "The Best Thing About Me Is You", "Frío", "Come with Me", "Perdóname", "Fiebre", and his 2020 songs, "Falta Amor" and "Tiburones (Remix)".

=== Live performances ===
Martin and Morrison gave their first virtual live performance of "Recuerdo" on the live broadcast of OHM Live and Global Gift Foundation on May 29, 2020. The broadcast garnered over 12 million viewers and its benefits served to alleviate the consequences of COVID-19 through different beneficiary organizations. The following day, they performed it virtually at the Se Agradece event, a special concert dedicated to thanking health personnel and all levels who have fought against the Coronavirus pandemic throughout the world. On June 23, 2020, Martin and Morrison separately performed the song on The Ellen DeGeneres Show. They also performed it for a virtual event, Can't Cancel Pride: Helping LGBTQ+ People in Need, to raise visibility and funds for LGBTQ+ communities.

Later that year, they performed "Recuerdo" at the Latin Grammy Awards on November 19, where Martin also performed his solo song, "Tiburones". Their performance was ranked as one of the best performances of that night by Entertainment Tonight. In an interview, Morrison spoke about her performance alongside Martin: "It means a lot because I'm from Tecate. And Tecate's a small town and I would have never in my life dreamt even about being a un lado de Ricky, not even standing-wise, like, 'Hey'. So to be there singing a song that we wrote together and that we collaborated on that's on his album is, to me, the most beautiful message I can give to anybody that wants to dream big." She also tweeted about it: "You were the sun of my 2020 and from the heart it will always remain in my MEMORY. Thank you very much for thinking of me for this presentation and congratulations on those Latin Grammys that you deserve so much."

== Credits and personnel ==
Credits adapted from Tidal.

- Ricky Martin – vocal, composer, lyricist, associated performer, executive producer
- Carla Morrison – vocal, composer, lyricist, associated performer
- Demián Jiménez – producer, composer
- Alejandro Jiménez – producer, composer, recording engineer, vocal producer
- Chiara Stroia – composer
- Amber Rubi Urena – A&R coordinator
- Oriana Hidalgo – A&R coordinator
- Rafa Arcaute – A&R director
- Isabel De Jesús – A&R director
- Francisco "Poco" Maldonado – assistant engineer
- Felipe Tichauer – mastering engineer
- Jaycen Joshua – mixing engineer
- Enrique Larreal – vocal engineer
- Jean Rodríguez – vocal producer

== Charts ==
=== Weekly charts ===
Weekly peak performance for "Recuerdo"
Chart (2020)	Peak position
Honduras Pop (Monitor Latino)	12
Puerto Rico (Monitor Latino)	9
US Latin Pop Airplay (Billboard)	12

=== Year-end charts ===
2020 year-end chart performance for "Recuerdo"
Chart (2020)	Position
Honduras Pop (Monitor Latino)	91
Puerto Rico (Monitor Latino)	76

== Certifications ==
Certifications and sales for "Recuerdo"
Region	Certification	Certified units/sales
Mexico (AMPROFON)	Platinum	60,000^{‡}
^{‡} Sales+streaming figures based on certification alone.

== Release history ==
Release dates and formats for "Recuerdo"
Region	Date	Format(s)	Label	Ref.
Latin America	July 23, 2020	Contemporary hit radio	Sony Music Latin	
