= Otra Noche en L.A. =

Single by Ricky Martin

from the EP Play
- Language: Spanish
- English title: "Another Night in L.A."
- Released: January 27, 2022
- Genre: Soft pop; soft rock
- Length: 3:31
- Label: Sony Latin
- Songwriters: Luis Angel O'Neill Laureano "Oneil"; Luís Miguel Gómez "Casta"; Ricky Martin; Juan Vargas; Kevyn Cruz "Keityn"; Lenin Yorney Palacios "Lexuz"
- Producers: Lexuz; Casta

Ricky Martin singles chronology
"Qué Rico Fuera" (2021)	"Otra Noche en L.A." (2022)	"A Veces Bien y a Veces Mal" (2022)

Music video
- "Otra Noche en L.A." on YouTube

"Otra Noche en L.A." (transl. "Another Night in L.A.") is a song recorded by Puerto Rican singer Ricky Martin for Martin's second extended play, Play (2022). The song was written by Oneil, Casta, Martin, Juan Vargas, Keityn, and Lexuz, while the production was handled by Lexuz and Casta. It was released for digital download and streaming by Sony Music Latin on January 27, 2022, as the lead single from the EP. A Spanish language mid-tempo soft pop and soft rock ballad, with elements of doo-wop, it is a love song about an ex-lover who has gone and the adventures they had together in Los Angeles.

"Otra Noche en L.A." received widely positive reviews from music critics, who complimented its production and Martin's vocals. The song was commercially successful in Latin America, reaching number one in Argentina, El Salvador, Guatemala, and Uruguay, as well as the top 10 in Costa Rica and Mexico. An accompanying music video, released simultaneously with the song, was directed by Daniela Vesco and filmed in Los Angeles. It depicts Martin remembering his ex-lover, while lounging around a house and driving a car around Los Angeles.

== Background and release ==
Ricky Martin started recording his eleventh studio album, initially titled Movimiento, in the second half of 2019, inspired by the 2019 political protests in Puerto Rico. While, because of the COVID-19 pandemic and subsequent personal experiences, Martin decided to split the album Movimiento into the two EPs Pausa and Play. He released Pausa in May 2020. On December 19, 2021, Martin shared a photo of himself on Instagram, with the caption, "A day in the office #videoshoot #newsingle". Almost one month later, he revealed the song's title as "Otra Noche en L.A.", shared the artwork, and announced that it would be released on January 27, 2022. The song was released for digital download and streaming by Sony Music Latin on the specified date, as the lead single from Play. An "Orbital Audio" version of the song was released simultaneously with the original. Martin explained about the song:

All my songs have something of my story, this can be from a romance in the past, a specific moment in my relationship that I miss, it can be the loss of friends, we can all identify with this story.

He added that the song "is born from those memories that keep us alive, motivate us or accelerate us". He described the track as "magical", saying that he hopes the listeners "identify with it and enjoy it".

== Music and lyrics ==
"Otra Noche en L.A."
A 21-second sample of the song's chorus, which features a mid-tempo melody.

Musically, "Otra Noche en L.A." is a Spanish language mid-tempo soft pop and soft rock ballad, with a shuffle beat and elements of doo-wop. It was written by Luis Angel O'Neill Laureano "Oneil", Luís Miguel Gómez "Casta", Martin, Juan Vargas, Kevyn Cruz "Keityn", and Lenin Yorney Palacios "Lexuz". The production was handled by Lexuz and Casta, and the track runs for a total of 3 minutes and 31 seconds. Lyrically, "Otra Noche en L.A.", which translates to "Another Night in L.A." in English, is a love song dedicated to an ex-lover who has gone. It is about the adventures they had together in Los Angeles and being away from the beloved one in the city. The romantic lyrics include: "Vuelve / Que el café se me enfría / Perdona lo infantil / Fueron tiempos de rebeldía / Ayer miré tu foto y yo con el corazón roto / Por qué en la foto debo estar yo suponía" (Come back / That the coffee gets cold / Forgive the childishness / Those were times of rebellion / Yesterday I looked at your photo with a broken heart / Because I was supposed to be in the photo).

== Critical reception ==
Upon release, "Otra Noche en L.A." was met with widely positive reviews from music critics. Stephen Daw from Billboard described the song as "a gorgeous ballad" and praised its production for bolstering the track. He also complimented Martin's "incredible, emotional vocals" for elevating the song to "a new level", labeling his vocal "[a] sweet sound". Also from Billboard, Leila Cobo commented that "the allure is irresistible" for the people who have lived in Los Angeles, while "the beat and the lyrics will do the trick" for the other listeners. She praised the song for being "impregnated with emotion" and veering from "the stereotypical reggaetón beat" with soft rock beats and doo-wop background vocals for "an overall cool/retro vibe that stands out from other releases".

¡Hola! staff wrote that Martin "takes us on a journey full of nostalgia and melancholy that can be felt not only for a person, but for a place or a memory" with "Otra Noche en L.A.". An author of Monitor Latino labeled the song "a potentially great hit", saying it "has a sexy and seductive wake, showing us an addictive sound for the ear" and the vibes are "conceived with a melodic line that has many rhymes", while the lyrics "will undoubtedly catch you". Pip Ellwood-Hughes from Entertainment Focus called the track "catchy" and iHeartRadio staff wrote, "how much we needed a ballad" like this, that was released "in time". Remezcla's Isabella Vega described it as "excitingly minimalistic" and introduced Martin "the legend himself".

== Commercial performance ==
"Otra Noche en L.A." debuted and peaked at number 50 on the US Latin Airplay chart on March 5, 2022, becoming Martin's 46th entry on the chart. The song also peaked at numbers 16 and 10 on Billboard's Latin Pop Airplay and Latin Digital Song Sales, respectively, giving Martin his 14th top-10 hit on the latter. It also extended Martin's own record as the artist with most top 20s on the US Latin Pop Airplay chart, with 52 songs. Besides the United States, "Otra Noche en L.A." reached number one in Argentina, Guatemala, El Salvador, and Uruguay, as well as the top 10 in Costa Rica and Mexico. It also peaked in the top 20 in Ecuador and Panama.

== Music video ==
A screenshot from the music video, depicting Martin laying in a bed.

On December 19, 2021, Martin shared a photo of himself in a bathtub on Instagram, revealing that it would be for his next music video. On January 10, 2022, he shared another bathtub photo, with the caption, "New song, new video, new moments. #soon". Ten days later, the singer released a trailer for the visual, depicting him walking in a bedroom, then walking out of frame to hug another person, that is seen on the shadows on the wall. The music video was released alongside the song on January 27, 2022. It was filmed at different locations in Los Angeles in two days, and directed by Costa Rican photographer and director Daniela Vesco, who made her debut as a director with directing the video. The visual shows Martin remembering his ex-lover, while lounging around a house, cooking, taking a shower and a bath, driving a car around Los Angeles, and carving in a bench, while looking through Hollywood. Hughes from Entertainment Focus described the music video as "steamy", and Remezcla's Vega gave it a positive review, saying it "perfectly captures the kind and nostalgic quality that the track has".

== Track listings ==
Digital download / streaming
No.	Title	Length
1.	"Otra Noche en L.A."	3:31

Digital download / streaming
No.	Title	Length
1.	"Otra Noche en L.A. (Orbital Audio)"	3:31

== Credits and personnel ==
Credits adapted from Tidal.

- Ricky Martin – vocal, composer, lyricist, associated performer
- Luis Angel O'Neill Laureano "Oneil" – composer, lyricist
- Luís Miguel Gómez "Casta" – composer, lyricist, producer
- Juan Vargas – composer, lyricist
- Kevyn Cruz "Keityn" – composer, lyricist, executive producer
- Lenin Yorney Palacios "Lexuz" – composer, lyricist, producer
- Mayra del Valle – A&R coordinator
- Izzy De Jesús – A&R director
- Jaycen Joshua – mastering engineer, mixing engineer
- Sergio Robledo – recording engineer
- Jean Rodríguez – vocal producer

== Charts ==
=== Weekly charts ===
Weekly peak performance for "Otra Noche en L.A."
Chart (2022)	Peak position
Argentina Hot 100 (Billboard)	67
Argentina (Monitor Latino)	1
Chile Pop (Monitor Latino)	10
Costa Rica (Monitor Latino)	8
Dominican Republic Pop (Monitor Latino)	7
Ecuador (Monitor Latino)	18
El Salvador (Monitor Latino)	1
Guatemala (Monitor Latino)	1
Mexico (Billboard Mexican Airplay)	6
Mexico (Monitor Latino)	4
Panama (Monitor Latino)	17
Peru Pop (Monitor Latino)	14
Puerto Rico Pop (Monitor Latino)	4
Uruguay (Monitor Latino)	1
US Latin Digital Song Sales (Billboard)	10
US Latin Airplay (Billboard)	50
US Latin Pop Airplay (Billboard)	16

=== Year-end charts ===
2022 year-end chart performance for "Otra Noche en L.A."
Chart (2022)	Position
Argentina (Monitor Latino)	27
Bolivia (Monitor Latino)	100
Chile Pop (Monitor Latino)	32
Costa Rica (Monitor Latino)	40
Dominican Republic Pop (Monitor Latino)	18
Guatemala (Monitor Latino)	57
El Salvador (Monitor Latino)	29
Latin America (Monitor Latino)	95
Mexico Pop (Monitor Latino)	26
Panama (Monitor Latino)	87
Paraguay Pop (Monitor Latino)	68
Puerto Rico Pop (Monitor Latino)	33
Uruguay (Monitor Latino)	20
US Latin Pop Airplay (Billboard)	48

== Release history ==
Release dates and formats for "Otra Noche en L.A."
Region	Date	Format(s)	Label	Ref.
Various	January 27, 2022	Digital download; streaming	Sony Music Latin	
Latin America	January 28, 2022	Contemporary hit radio	Sony Music Latin	
Russia	June 17, 2022	Contemporary hit radio	Sony Music Latin	
