= A Veces Bien y a Veces Mal =

2022 single by Ricky Martin

Single by Ricky Martin and Reik

from the EP Play
- Language: Spanish
- English title: "Sometimes Good and Sometimes Bad"
- Released: April 14, 2022
- Genre: Pop
- Length: 2:25
- Label: Sony Latin
- Songwriters: Pedro Capó; Pablo Preciado; Andrés Torres; Enrique Martin; Ignacio Cibrian; Mauricio Rengifo; Julio Ramirez Juvelo
- Producers: Torres; Rengifo

Ricky Martin singles chronology
"Otra Noche en L.A." (2022)	"A Veces Bien y a Veces Mal" (2022)

Reik singles chronology
"Solo quiero dedicarte" (2022)	"A Veces Bien y a Veces Mal" (2022)

Music video
- "A Veces Bien y a Veces Mal" on YouTube

"A Veces Bien y a Veces Mal" (transl. "Sometimes Good and Sometimes Bad") is a song recorded by Puerto Rican singer Ricky Martin and Mexican band Reik for Martin's second extended play, Play (2022). The song was written by Pedro Capó, Pablo Preciado, Andrés Torres, Martin, Kiko Cibrian, Mauricio Rengifo, and Julio Ramirez Juvelo, while the production was handled by Torres and Rengifo. It was released for digital download and streaming by Sony Music Latin on April 14, 2022, as the second single from the EP. A Spanish language pop ballad, it is a heartbreak song, describing what happens when you miss someone with whom you still hope to return one day, and the vulnerability of a heart that resists having to accept reality.

"A Veces Bien y a Veces Mal" received widely positive reviews from music critics, who complimented its lyrics. The track was nominated for Song of the Year at the 23rd Annual Latin Grammy Awards. It was commercially successful, reaching number one on Billboard's Latin Airplay and Latin Pop Airplay charts. An accompanying music video, released simultaneously with the song, was directed by Daniela Vesco and filmed in Puerto Rico.

== Background and release ==
Ricky Martin started recording his eleventh studio album, initially titled Movimiento, in the second half of 2019, inspired by the 2019 political protests in Puerto Rico. While, because of the COVID-19 pandemic and subsequent personal experiences, Martin decided to split the album Movimiento into the two EPs Pausa and Play. He released Pausa in May 2020, and launched "Qué Rico Fuera" and "Otra Noche en L.A." as the first two singles from Play. On March 2, 2022, Martin confirmed that the next single from Play would be a collaboration with Reik. A few weeks later, on April 12, Martin revealed the song's title as "A Veces Bien y a Veces Mal" and announced that it would be released on April 14, 2022. The song was released for digital download and streaming by Sony Music Latin on the specified date, marking the first collaboration between Martin and Reik. An "Orbital Audio" version of the song was released simultaneously with the original.

During an interview with the Los Angeles Times, Martin explained that they recorded the song at the beginning of the COVID-19 pandemic and "thought it had to come out at the right time, not before or after", saying that it takes him back to the beginning of his career. He added about the collaboration: "I really wanted to work with Reik, they are an extremely talented group." Jesús Navarro, vocal leader of Reik told the newspaper:

Ricky is one of the most complete and enormous artists in terms of talent and range, and we have been his fan for many years. To be able to collaborate with him for the first time is something very special for us and even more so, with a song as honest as this one.

== Music and lyrics ==
"A Veces Bien y a Veces Mal"
A 14-second sample of the song's chorus, which features a slow and intense rhythm.

Musically, "A Veces Bien y a Veces Mal" is a Spanish language pop ballad, with a slow and intense rhythm. It was written by Pedro Capó, Pablo Preciado, Andrés Torres, Martin, Kiko Cibrian, Mauricio Rengifo, and Julio Ramirez Juvelo. The production was handled by Torres and Rengifo, and the track runs for a total of 2 minutes and 25 seconds. Lyrically, "A Veces Bien y a Veces Mal" which translates to "Sometimes Good and Sometimes Bad" in English, is a heartbreak song about the feelings that are shared flourish in the absence of a special person, whose emptiness reminds us that it is "easy to love, but difficult to forget". It describes what happens when you miss someone with whom you still hope to return one day, and the vulnerability of a heart that resists having to accept reality. The lyrics include: "Le faltan piezas al rompecabezas / Ha sido duro mi amor / Como pesan las fotos que siguen adornando mi mesa / Ay como duele cuando un hombre pierde lo quiere" (Puzzle pieces are missing / It has been hard, my love / How heavy are the photos that continue to decorate my table / Oh how it hurts when a man loses what he wants).

== Critical reception ==
Upon release, "A Veces Bien y a Veces Mal" was met with widely positive reviews from music critics. In her review for Billboard, Griselda Flores labeled the song "a beautiful pop ballad that marries Martin and Jesús Navarro's dramatic-but-soothing vocals, effortlessly evoking pain and sorrow". Tommy Calle from the Los Angeles Times stated that it "reaches deep into the hearts of those who have lost a loved one", describing Martin and Reik's interpretation as "emotional". He continued with admiring the combination of their voices as "simply sublime". An author of Monitor Latino named the track a "nostalgic ballad", while FM Dos critic Érika Cabrera called the ballad "exciting". Univision's Lideny Villatoro described it as "the perfect collaboration". Similarly, a writer of Paris Beacon News named it "the perfect mix", praising the collaboration as an "incredible and beautiful musical project". Los 40's Paula Bascoli labeled Martin and Reik "two exponents of the romantic genre in the world". Also from Los 40, Pascale Quililongo stated that the song "reminds us of the best romantic hits that marked the 2000s".

=== Accolades ===
"A Veces Bien y a Veces Mal" was nominated for Song of the Year at the 23rd Annual Latin Grammy Awards, but lost to "Tocarte" by Jorge Drexler and C. Tangana. The song has been also nominated for Pop Collaboration of the Year and Pop/Ballad Song of the Year at the 35th Annual Lo Nuestro Awards.

== Commercial performance ==
"A Veces Bien y a Veces Mal" debuted and peaked at number 50 on the US Billboard Hot Latin Songs chart on August 27, 2022, becoming Martin's 51st entry on the chart and Reik's 25th. The song also peaked at number one on both the Latin Airplay and Latin Pop Airplay charts, becoming Martin's 18th and Reik's 4th number one on the former, making Martin tie Bad Bunny to hold the eighth-most number ones on the list. On the latter, it became Martin's twelfth crowning hit and Reik's fourth. It also extended Martin's own record as the artist with most top 20s on the US Latin Pop Airplay chart, with 53 songs, and became his 41st top 10 hit on the chart, making him the second artist in history to achieve this milestone. Besides the United States, "A Veces Bien y a Veces Mal" reached the top 10 in Mexico and Puerto Rico, as well as the top 20 in Bolivia, Costa Rica, El Salvador, and Guatemala.

== Music video ==
A screenshot from the music video, depicting Martin and Reik singing the song on the beach.

On February 11, 2022, Martin shared photos of himself walking on a beach, with the hashtags #secretproject and #comingsoon. Almost two months later, he shared snippets of the accompanying music video for "A Veces Bien y a Veces Mal", announcing that it would be released alongside the song on April 14, 2022. The black-and-white video was filmed in Puerto Rico and directed by Costa Rican director Daniela Vesco, who had also directed the video for Martin's previous single "Otra Noche en L.A.". Beach, sand, palm trees, and the sea appear in the visual, as well as a black background in the middle of a valley landscape in which the singers sing the song. The video also features the Spanish model Ángela Ponce, the first openly transgender woman to be crowned Miss Spain. Martin explained about his idea of featuring her in the visual: "She is a symbol of success, of equality, and the work she has done on behalf of our community around the world has been extremely important. A song as beautiful as this should have a beautiful woman like her as a model." Tommy Calle from the Los Angeles Times gave the music video a positive review, saying: "The use of drones for aerial shots are phenomenal and show the beauty of the Puerto Rican coast."

== Track listings ==
Digital download / streaming
No.	Title	Length
1.	"A Veces Bien y a Veces Mal"	2:25

Digital download / streaming
No.	Title	Length
1.	"A Veces Bien y a Veces Mal" (Orbital Audio)	2:25

== Credits and personnel ==
- Ricky Martin – vocal, composer, lyricist, associated performer
- Reik – vocal, associated performer
- Pedro Capó – composer, lyricist
- Pablo Preciado – composer, lyricist
- Andrés Torres – composer, lyricist, producer, keyboards, recording engineer, programmer
- Ignacio Cibrian – composer, lyricist
- Mauricio Rengifo – composer, lyricist, producer, keyboards, recording engineer, programmer
- Julio Ramirez Juvelo – composer, lyricist
- Jacob Richards – assistant engineer
- Jaycen Joshua – mastering engineer, mixing engineer

== Charts ==
=== Weekly charts ===
Weekly peak performance for "A Veces Bien y a Veces Mal"
Chart (2022)	Peak position
Argentina Latin (Monitor Latino)	16
Bolivia (Monitor Latino)	16
Costa Rica (Monitor Latino)	11
Dominican Republic Pop (Monitor Latino)	12
Ecuador Pop (Monitor Latino)	20
El Salvador (Monitor Latino)	13
Guatemala (Monitor Latino)	18
Mexico (Billboard Mexican Airplay)	9
Mexico (Monitor Latino)	12
Puerto Rico (Monitor Latino)	8
US Hot Latin Songs (Billboard)	50
US Latin Airplay (Billboard)	1
US Latin Pop Airplay (Billboard)	1

=== Year-end charts ===
2022 year-end chart performance for "A Veces Bien y a Veces Mal"
Chart (2022)	Position
Argentina (Monitor Latino)	83
Costa Rica (Monitor Latino)	63
Dominican Republic Pop (Monitor Latino)	71
El Salvador Pop (Monitor Latino)	83
Guatemala (Monitor Latino)	65
Latin America (Monitor Latino)	56
Mexico Pop (Monitor Latino)	30
Puerto Rico (Monitor Latino)	22
US Latin Airplay (Billboard)	34
US Latin Pop Airplay (Billboard)	8

== Release history ==
Release dates and formats for "A Veces Bien y a Veces Mal"
Region	Date	Format(s)	Label	Ref.
Various	April 14, 2022	Digital download; streaming	Sony Music Latin	
Latin America	April 22, 2022	Contemporary hit radio	Sony Music Latin	
Russia	May 3, 2022	Contemporary hit radio	Sony Music Latin	

== See also ==
- List of Billboard Hot Latin Songs and Latin Airplay number ones of 2022
