= Falta Amor =

Falta Amor may refer to:

- Falta Amor (album), a 1990 album by Maná
- "Falta Amor" (song), a 2020 song by Sebastián Yatra and Ricky Martin
