= Play (Ricky Martin EP) =

EP by Ricky Martin
- Released: July 13, 2022
- Length: 16:40
- Language: Spanish
- Label: Sony Latin
- Producer: Subelo NEO; Filly; Nup; JC Entertainment; L.e.x.u.z; Primo; Keityn; Casta; Ciey; Andrés Torres; Mauricio Rengifo

Ricky Martin chronology
Pausa (2020)	Play (2022)

Singles from Play
- 1. "Otra Noche en L.A." Released: January 27, 2022; 2. "A Veces Bien y a Veces Mal" Released: April 14, 2022

Play is the second extended play by Puerto Rican singer Ricky Martin. It was released on July 13, 2022, through Sony Music Latin. Originally planned as a full-length album, Martin changed the concept following the spread of the COVID-19 pandemic and his experience with panic attacks. He split the album into two EP's, Pausa, which was released in May 2020, and Play. It was promoted with two singles, "Otra Noche en L.A." and "A Veces Bien y a Veces Mal". The former was a commercial success in Latin America, while the latter, which is a collaboration with Reik, became a top-10 hit in Mexico and Puerto Rico.

== Background and release ==
In January 2020, Ricky Martin announced the release of his eleventh studio album, initially titled Movimiento. The record was supposed to be inspired by Puerto Rico's recent history including Hurricane Maria in 2017, the 2019 political protests and the 2019–20 earthquakes. However, following the spread of COVID-19 pandemic, Martin started experiencing panic attacks, "I spent two weeks with a poker face so my family wouldn't be affected, but finally I was able to raise my head and say ‘eh, something very good has to come out of this, get creative.’ And I started making music and it was my medicine, honestly, because I really felt like I was gasping for air." Subsequently, he contacted his label, Sony, and decided to split the album in two extended plays, Pausa and Play. Martin described the former as more "chill" and "relaxed", while the latter will consist of more upbeat songs. Pausa was released on May 28, 2020. It was nominated for Album of the Year and won Best Pop Vocal Album at the 21st Annual Latin Grammy Awards. On July 13, 2022, Martin surprise-released Play for digital download and streaming. He wrote about it on Twitter:

Making music, selecting the songs, and sharing them with you is my passion. I have been doing it for 38 years and your reaction is, without a doubt, the motivation that drives me forward on this complex journey called life. I don't want to wait any longer. Here is a surprise release of my new music for you with love. I hope you enjoy it as much as I did making it.

== Recording and composition ==
Play consists of six songs, two out of which are collaborations. During an interview with Allure, he described the creative process as "insane" and said: "You just never know how you're going to be seduced by the muse. I thought I was going to release a hard-core, party, danceable kind of album with Play, and nope." He explained that whenever he locks himself "in the studio with different producers and different composers", he "had an idea of what [he] thought was going to come out, and nothing but very beautiful and gentle soothing sounds came about". Martin met Colombian composer and producer Keityn in 2021, and recorded four tracks for the EP: "Otra Noche en L.A.", "Amordio", "Paris in Love", and "Reina de Corazones". Martin later recorded "A Veces Bien Y A Veces Mal" with Mexican band Reik and "Ácido Sabor" with the production team SubeloNEO in 2022. He explained to Latina that the EP was mainly inspired by his native, Puerto Rico: "It was a need to go back to the purity of the beginning. La poesia de la calle is there. It's present. It's pulsating. I was really in touch with nature. Obviously the island vibe." The EP is filled with love songs.

== Singles ==
"Otra Noche en L.A." was released for digital download and streaming by Sony Music Latin on January 27, 2022, as the lead single from Play. The song was commercially successful in Latin America, reaching number one in Argentina, El Salvador, Guatemala, and Uruguay, as well as the top 10 in Costa Rica and Mexico. "A Veces Bien y a Veces Mal" was released for digital download and streaming by Sony Music Latin on April 14, 2022, as the second single from the EP. The track reached the top 10 in Mexico and Puerto Rico.

== Critical reception ==
Upon release, Play was met with widely positive reviews from music critics. Griselda Flores from Billboard gave the EP a positive review, saying it "is just as profound as its predecessor [Pausa], with Martin as vulnerable as ever in navigating love and heartbreak". She described "Otra Noche en L.A." and "A Veces Bien y a Veces Mal" as "evocative ballads", while praising them for pairing "perfectly" with the other tracks, "Amordio", "Paris in Love", and "Ácido Sabor", those which she named "pop gems". El Nuevo Día staff described it as "a collection of enigmatic melodies and rhythms accompanied by the unmistakable voice of Ricky Martin". An author of Los 40 wrote that Play "would culminate" his previous EP Pausa. Writing for LatinPop Brasil, Priscila Bertozzi commended Martin's "versatility and identity" on the EP and its "powerful cinematic and musical concept", saying he "brings a powerful metaphor to life in his new project". Lucas Villa from Latina labeled it "[an] irresistible EP" that "is meant to be played in the bedroom", describing "Ácido Sabor", "Paris in Love", and "Amordio" as "seriously sexy", "funky", and "frisky", respectively. An author of Terra highlighted "Ácido Sabor" as "a dancing and melancholic ballad in the same proportion", "Amordio" for being "soft in melody but extremely dense in terms of lyrics", and "Paris in Love" as "an engaging song". They also noted "the sensual aesthetic that consecrated the singer even in the 1990s" in "Paris in Love".

=== Accolades ===
Play was nominated for Album of the Year at the 24th Annual Latin Grammy Awards, but lost to Karol G's Mañana Será Bonito. It was also nominated for Pop Album of the Year at the 35th Annual Lo Nuestro Awards.

== Track listing ==
Play track listing
No.	Title	Writer(s)	Producer(s)	Length
1.	"Ácido Sabor"	Freddy Montalvo; Enrique "Ricky" Martin Morales; José Carlos Cruz; Isaac Ortiz Geronimo; Sébastien Julien Alfred	Subelo NEO	3:30
2.	"Amordio"	Martin; Kevyn Mauricio Cruz "Keityn"; Luis Angel O'Neill Laureano	Filly; Nup; JC Entertainment; Lenin Yorney Palacios "L.e.x.u.z"; Primo; Keityn	2:27
3.	"Paris in Love"	Keityn; Martin	Luís Miguel Gómez "Casta"; Filly; Ciey; Nup; Keityn; JC Entertainment; L.e.x.u.z	2:31
4.	"Reina de Corazones" (featuring Keityn)	Martin; Keityn; Laureano	Casta; Keityn; JC Entertainment; L.e.x.u.z	2:16
5.	"Otra Noche en L.A."	L.e.x.u.z; Casta; Martin; Juan Vargas; Keityn; Laureano	Casta; L.e.x.u.z	3:31
6.	"A Veces Bien y a Veces Mal" (with Reik)	Pedro Capó; Julio Ramirez Juvelo; Pablo Preciado; Andrés Torres; Martin; Ignacio Cibrian; Mauricio Rengifo	Torres; Mauricio Rengifo	2:25
Total length:				16:40
