= Cántalo =

2019 single by Ricky Martin

Single by Ricky Martin, Residente, and Bad Bunny

from the EP Pausa
- Language: Spanish
- English title: "Sing It"
- Released: November 12, 2019
- Recorded: 2019
- Genre: Salsa; reggaeton
- Length: 3:38
- Label: Sony Latin
- Songwriters: René Pérez; Benito Martínez Ocasio; Danay Suárez; Enrique Martin; Rubén Blades; Johnny Pacheco
- Producers: Residente; Trooko

Ricky Martin singles chronology
"No Se Me Quita" (2019)	"Cántalo" (2019)	"Tiburones" (2020)

Residente singles chronology
"Pecador" (2019)	"Cántalo" (2019)	"Afilando Los Cuchillos" (2019)

Bad Bunny singles chronology
"Soy El Diablo (Remix)" (2019)	"Cántalo" (2019)	"Vete" (2019)

Lyric Video
- "Cántalo" on YouTube

"Cántalo" (transl. "Sing It") is a song recorded by Puerto Rican singer Ricky Martin with Puerto Rican rappers Residente and Bad Bunny for Martin's first extended play, Pausa (2020). The song was written by Residente, Bad Bunny, Danay Suárez, Martin, Rubén Blades, and Johnny Pacheco, while the production was handled by Residente and Trooko. It was released for digital download and streaming by Sony Music Latin on November 12, 2019, as the lead single from the EP. A Spanish language salsa and reggaeton song, it is about union and celebration.

"Cántalo" received widely positive reviews from music critics, who complimented its lyrics, and fusion of sounds and genres. The song reached the top 10 in Martin's native Puerto Rico, and the top 15 in Panama. It was nominated for Best Urban Fusion/Performance at the 21st Annual Latin Grammy Awards. To promote the song, Martin, Residente, and Bad Bunny performed it at the 2019 Latin Grammy Awards. For further promotion, Spotify promoted the release on billboards in Times Square.

== Background and development ==
Telegramgate, also known as Chatgate, was a political scandal involving Ricardo Rosselló, then Governor of Puerto Rico, which began on July 8, 2019, with the leak of hundreds of pages of a group chat on the messaging application Telegram between Rosselló and members of his cabinet. The messages were considered vulgar, misogynistic, and homophobic toward several individuals and groups, including Ricky Martin. Therefore, Martin, Bad Bunny, Residente and several other artists, and more than half a million Puerto Ricans led the call to take to the streets of Puerto Rico, demanding Rosselló's resignation. Martin started recording his eleventh studio album, initially titled Movimiento, in the second half of 2019, inspired by the political protests in Puerto Rico.

On November 6, 2019, Martin shared the artwork for his new single on his Instagram and announced that it would be a collaboration with Bad Bunny and Residente, titled "Cántalo". The cover replicates Puerto Rican protest posters demanding the resignation of Roselló. Four days later, Martin shared a photo of himself and his fellow artists in studio, and revealed the single's release date as November 12, 2019. In an interview with El Nuevo Día, he told the newspaper about "Cántalo", saying it has "a fascinating story, starting with the fact that La Fania gave me the master [recordings] of 'Mi Gente' to work on this song, which is a very great responsibility and it fills my heart with pride". He continued:

I've always wanted to bring generations together through my music, and I have to give much credit to Residente, an excellent producer and lyricist, and certainly to Bad Bunny, the new face of the genre and a very young person who has very important things to tell. We have many things in common and that's where magic is born. I'm really excited I can collaborate with artists as talented and special as them.

Residente also told El Nuevo Día about the collaboration, saying it "continues to show the union through music and within a circle of different generations that represent our culture and heritage", going on to call the song "an incredible experience to integrate 'Mi Gente' a song with a rich history from its creation in Africa to its global impact". "Cántalo" marked the first collaboration between Martin and the two other artists, while Residente and Bad Bunny had previously worked on the 2019 singles "Bellacoso" and "Afilando los cuchillos" together.

== Music and lyrics ==
"Cántalo "
A 15-second sample of the chorus, which is "a hybrid of sounds and genres", and references Héctor Lavoe's "Mi Gente".

Musically, "Cántalo" is a Spanish language salsa and reggaeton song, written by Residente, Bad Bunny, Cuban singer-songwriter Danay Suárez, Martin, Panamanian musician Rubén Blades, and Dominican musician Johnny Pacheco. Its production was handled by Residente and Trooko, and the song features elements of trap, hip-hop, Latin pop, jazz, and bossa nova. The song runs for a total of 3 minutes and 38 seconds, uses several instruments including a tambora and trumpet, and inspires the union of the human race regardless of religion, social status or flag color.

Throughout the roaring and richly cultural song, the trio sing about union and celebration. The chorus of the track references Héctor Lavoe's 1974 song "Mi Gente", and reverts to "full-throttle salsa" between Residente and Bad Bunny rap verses. After Bad Bunny's verse, the song nods to a half-time tempo, before another chorus.

== Release and promotion ==
The song was released for digital download and streaming as a single by Sony Music Latin on November 12, 2019. For further promotion, Spotify promoted the release on billboards in Times Square. Because of the COVID-19 pandemic and subsequent personal experiences, Martin decided to split the album Movimiento into the two EPs Pausa and Play. "Cántalo" was included as the sixth track on his debut EP Pausa, released May 28, 2020. On June 23, 2020, an accompanying lyric video was released on Martin's YouTube channel. A headphone mix of the song, created using "Orbital Audio" technology, was included as the sixth track on the headphone mix version of the EP, released July 30, 2020.

Martin, Residente, and Bad Bunny gave their first live performance of "Cántalo" at the 20th Annual Latin Grammy Awards on November 14, 2019, which was ranked as one of the best moments of the ceremony by Rolling Stone. The song was included on Martin's the Movimiento Tour, which began at the José Miguel Agrelot Coliseum in San Juan, Puerto Rico on February 7, 2020. During the performances of "Cántalo" for the tour, he wore a black outfit, and usually appeared at the top of a staircase placed in the middle of a stage. Martin also performed "Cántalo" along with his other hits during the 61st Viña del Mar International Song Festival on February 23, 2020.

== Critical reception ==
Upon release, "Cántalo" was met with widely positive reviews from music critics. Suzette Fernandez from Billboard gave the song a positive review, praising it for leaving aside the commercial sound and becoming a cultural song that carries a message of union and celebration. She also complimented the song for its perfectly fusion of sounds, and admired "the combination of Martin's voice with Residente and Bad Bunny's rap style and the lyrics" that make the track "unique". Writing for Hypebeast, Sophie Caraan praised "Cántalo", saying: "Fusing traditional sounds found in Latin music and Residente and Bunny's trap style, the track calls for everybody to stand for what’s right instead of turning a blind eye to injustice." She also described the song as "[a] cultural anthem that calls for unification and celebration". Alicia Alonso from Cadena Dial described it as "a song with Latin rhythms that promises to be the song that everyone is going to dance and sing".

An author of Los 40 complimented the track, labeling it "a song that brings together all cultures regardless of religion or country". An author of Rádio Comercial wrote about the song: "A little bit of classic salsa, a few splashes of reggaeton (enough) and a little bit of hip-hop. Everything moves, joins the power trio Ricky Martin, Residente and Bad Bunny and the result is 'Cántalo'." Writing for 20 minutos, David Moreno Sáenz described the song as "a true tribute to Latin music that fuses genres from reggaeton to bossa nova through more urban music or jazz".

=== Accolades ===
TNT Latin America ranked "Cántalo" as one of the Best Collaborations of 2019. It was nominated for Best Urban Fusion/Performance at the 21st Annual Latin Grammy Awards, but lost to "Yo x Ti, Tu x Mi" by Rosalía and Ozuna.

== Commercial performance ==
"Cántalo" debuted at number 35 on the US Hot Latin Songs chart, becoming Martin's 48th entry on the chart, Residente's second, and Bad Bunny's 62nd. It also peaked at number 23 on the US Latin Airplay chart, number 11 on both the Latin Pop Airplay and Latin Rhythm Airplay charts, and number 3 on the US Latin Digital Song Sales chart, becoming Residente's highest peak and his longest running hit on the last chart. The song was certified Latin gold by the Recording Industry Association of America (RIAA), for track-equivalent sales of over 30,000 units in the United States. Besides the US, "Cántalo" reached the top 10 in Puerto Rico, and the top 15 in Panama.

== Track listing ==
Digital download / streaming
No.	Title	Length
1.	"Cántalo"	3:38

== Credits and personnel ==
Credits adapted from Tidal.

- Ricky Martin – vocal, composer, lyricist, associated performer, executive producer
- Residente – vocal, composer, producer, lyricist, associated performer
- Bad Bunny – vocal, composer, lyricist, associated performer
- Trooko – producer, recording engineer
- Danay Suárez – composer, lyricist
- Johnny Pacheco – composer, lyricist
- Rubén Blades – composer, lyricist, background vocal
- Karina Pagán – A&R coordinator
- Mireille Bravo – A&R coordinator
- Amber Urena – A&R coordinator
- Isabel De Jesús – A&R director
- Tito Allen – background vocal
- Carmila Ramírez – background vocal
- Daniel Díaz – congas
- Ted Jensen – mastering engineer
- Tom Elmhirst – mixing engineer
- Leo Genovese – piano
- Daniel Prim – percussion
- Enrique Larreal – recording engineer
- Phil Joly – recording engineer
- Luis Quintero – timbales
- Rey Alejandre – trombone
- Diego Urcola – trumpet
- Jean Rodriguez – vocal engineer

== Charts ==
=== Weekly charts ===
Weekly peak performance for "Cántalo"
Chart (2019–2020)	Peak position
Panama (Monitor Latino)	13
Puerto Rico (Monitor Latino)	10
US Hot Latin Songs (Billboard)	35
US Latin Airplay (Billboard)	23
US Latin Pop Airplay (Billboard)	11
US Latin Rhythm Airplay (Billboard)	11
Venezuela (Record Report)	51

=== Year-end charts ===
2020 year-end chart performance for "Cántalo"
Chart (2020)	Position
Chile Urbano (Monitor Latino)	94
Puerto Rico Urbano (Monitor Latino)	77
Venezuela Urbano (Monitor Latino)	99

== Certifications ==
Certifications and sales for "Cántalo"
Region	Certification	Certified units/sales
Mexico (AMPROFON)	Gold	30,000^{‡}
United States (RIAA)	Gold (Latin)	30,000^{‡}
^{‡} Sales+streaming figures based on certification alone.

== Release history ==
Release dates and formats for "Cántalo"
Region	Date	Format(s)	Label	Ref.
Various	November 12, 2019	Digital download; streaming	Sony Music Latin	
Puerto Rico	November 13, 2019	Contemporary hit radio	Sony Music Latin	
