= List of number-one songs of 2021 (Bolivia) =

This is a list of the number-one songs of 2021 in Bolivia. The airplay charts are published by Monitor Latino, based on airplay across radio stations in Bolivia utilizing the Radio Tracking Data, LLC in real time. Charts are compiled from Monday to Sunday.

== Chart history (Monitor Latino) ==
=== General ===
Issue date	Song	Artist(s)	Ref.
January 4	"Amor Amor"	Bonny Lovy featuring Serkiel	
January 11	"Bendicion"	Emilia featuring Alex Rose	
January 18	"Bendicion"	Emilia featuring Alex Rose	
January 25	"Bendicion"	Emilia featuring Alex Rose	
February 1	"Bendicion"	Emilia featuring Alex Rose	
February 8	"Bonita"	Gyzuz featuring Landa Freak	
February 15	"Bendicion"	Emilia featuring Alex Rose	
February 22	"Momento Perfecto"	Ache	
March 1	"Agua De Jamaica"	Maluma	
March 8	"Agua De Jamaica"	Maluma	
March 15	"Agua De Jamaica"	Maluma	
March 22	"Se Parece A Ella"	NKlabe	
March 29	"AM"	Nio Garcia	
April 5	"AM"	Nio Garcia	
April 12	"AM"	Nio Garcia	
April 19	"Canción Bonita"	Carlos Vives & Ricky Martin	
April 26	"Canción Bonita"	Carlos Vives & Ricky Martin	
May 3	"Canción Bonita"	Carlos Vives & Ricky Martin	
May 10	"Canción Bonita"	Carlos Vives & Ricky Martin	
