= List of number-one songs of 2021 (Chile) =

This is a list of the number-one songs of 2021 in Chile. The airplay charts are published by Monitor Latino, based on airplay across radio stations in Chile utilizing the Radio Tracking Data, LLC in real time. Charts are compiled from Monday to Sunday.

== Chart history (Monitor Latino) ==
=== General ===
Issue Date	Song	Artist(s)	Ref.
January 4	"Travesuras" (Remix)	Nio Garcia, Casper Magico & Ozuna featuring Wisin & Yandel, Myke Towers & Flow La Movie	
January 11	"Mala Costumbre"	Manuel Turizo and Wisin & Yandel	
January 18	"Mala Costumbre"	Manuel Turizo and Wisin & Yandel	
January 25	"Mala Costumbre"	Manuel Turizo and Wisin & Yandel	
February 1	"Mala Costumbre"	Manuel Turizo and Wisin & Yandel	
February 8	"Tan Enamorados"	CNCO	
February 15	"Fan De Tus Fotos"	Nicky Jam and Romeo Santos	
February 22	"Fan De Tus Fotos"	Nicky Jam and Romeo Santos	
March 1	"Fan De Tus Fotos"	Nicky Jam and Romeo Santos	
March 8	"Fan De Tus Fotos"	Nicky Jam and Romeo Santos	
March 15	"Tan Enamorados"	CNCO	
March 22	"Tan Enamorados"	CNCO	
March 29	"Fan De Tus Fotos"	Nicky Jam and Romeo Santos	
April 5	"AM"	Nio Garcia	
April 12	"Agua de Jamaica"	Maluma	
April 19	"Agua de Jamaica"	Maluma	
April 26	"Canción Bonita"	Carlos Vives & Ricky Martin	
May 3	"Canción Bonita"	Carlos Vives & Ricky Martin	
May 10	"Canción Bonita"	Carlos Vives & Ricky Martin	
May 17	"Canción Bonita"	Carlos Vives & Ricky Martin	
