= List of number-one songs of 2020 (Puerto Rico) =

This is a list of the number-one songs of 2020 in Puerto Rico. The airplay charts are published by Monitor Latino, based on airplay across radio stations in Puerto Rico utilizing the Radio Tracking Data, LLC in real time. Charts are compiled from Monday to Sunday. Besides the General chart, Monitor Latino publishes "Pop", "Anglo", "Urbano" and "Tropical" charts.

== Chart history (Monitor Latino) ==
=== General ===
Issue Date	Song	Artist(s)	Ref.
January 6	"Que Tire Pa Lante"	Daddy Yankee	
January 13	"Que Tire Pa Lante"	Daddy Yankee	
January 20	"Tusa"	Karol G & Nicki Minaj	
January 27	"Tusa"	Karol G & Nicki Minaj	
February 3	"Tusa"	Karol G & Nicki Minaj	
February 10	"Tusa"	Karol G & Nicki Minaj	
February 17	"Qué Pena"	Maluma ft. J Balvin	
February 24	"Lo Mejor Version de Mi"	Natti Natasha & Romeo Santos	
March 2	"Lo Mejor Version de Mi"	Natti Natasha & Romeo Santos	
March 9	"Blanco"	J Balvin	
March 16	"Subelo (Further Up)"	Static And Ben El ft Chesca & Pitbull	
March 23	"Muévelo"	Nicky Jam & Daddy Yankee	
March 30	"Tiburones"	Ricky Martin	
April 6	"Tiburones"	Ricky Martin	
April 13	"Tiburones"	Ricky Martin	

=== Pop ===
Issue Date	Song	Artist(s)	Ref.
January 6	"Tanto"	Jesse & Joy ft. Luis Fonsi	
January 13	"Tanto"	Jesse & Joy ft. Luis Fonsi	
January 20	"Tanto"	Jesse & Joy ft. Luis Fonsi	
January 27	"No Pienso Volver"	Ednita Nazario	
February 3	"No Pienso Volver"	Ednita Nazario	
February 10	"Tiburones"	Ricky Martin	
February 17	"Tiburones"	Ricky Martin	
February 24	"Subelo (Further Up)"	Static And Ben El ft Chesca & Pitbull	
March 2	"Subelo (Further Up)"	Static And Ben El ft Chesca & Pitbull	
March 9	"Subelo (Further Up)"	Static And Ben El ft Chesca & Pitbull	
March 16	"Subelo (Further Up)"	Static And Ben El ft Chesca & Pitbull	
March 23	"Tiburones"	Ricky Martin	
March 30	"Tiburones"	Ricky Martin	
April 6	"Tiburones"	Ricky Martin	
April 13	"Tiburones"	Ricky Martin	
