= Falta Amor (song) =

Single by Sebastián Yatra and Ricky Martin
- Language: Spanish
- English title: "Missing Love"
- Released: March 26, 2020
- Recorded: 2019
- Genre: Pop rock; Latin pop
- Length: 3:23
- Label: Universal Music Latino
- Songwriters: Andrés Torres; Mauricio Rengifo; Sebastián Obando Giraldo
- Producers: Torres; Rengifo

Sebastián Yatra singles chronology
"TBT" (2020)	"Falta Amor" (2020)	"Locura" (2020)

Ricky Martin singles chronology
"Tiburones" (2020)	"Falta Amor" (2020)	"Canción Bonita" (2021)

Music video
- "Falta Amor" on YouTube

"Falta Amor" (transl. "Missing Love") is a song recorded by Colombian singer Sebastián Yatra and Puerto Rican singer Ricky Martin. A solo version was originally included on Yatra's second studio album, Fantasía (2019). A few months after the release of the album, Martin joined Yatra to re-record the song. It was written by Andrés Torres, Mauricio Rengifo, and Yatra, while the production was handled by the former two. The duet was released as a single for digital download and streaming by Universal Music Latino on March 26, 2020.

A Spanish language pop rock and Latin pop ballad, the song speaks of a man who had a good relationship with his partner, but she suddenly left him. The song received widely positive reviews from music critics, who complimented its lyrics and the singers' vocals. "Falta Amor" was nominated for Best Pop Song at the 10th Annual Latino Show Music Awards. The song reached the top 10 in Argentina, Costa Rica, and Ecuador, as well as the top 20 in Bolivia, Latin America, and Uruguay. It was certified Latin platinum in the United States by the Recording Industry Association of America (RIAA).

An accompanying music video, released simultaneously with the song, was directed by Carlos Perez and filmed in Los Angeles, California. The video depicts Yatra and Martin gently grieve a detached love in a ruined factory, fronting a rock band and a group of masked dancers who do a choreography. To promote "Falta Amor", Yatra performed it for Radio Disney's Separados Pero Juntos and MTV's Juntos A Distancia both in 2020. Several artists have recorded their own cover versions of the song, most notably Tini.

== Background and release ==
On March 3, 2019, Sebastián Yatra announced that his second studio album would be titled Fantasía and shared its artwork on social media. 10 days later, Billboard revealed the album's track list in an article, mentioning it being set for release on April 12, 2019. Yatra told the magazine about the album: "I hope that with this album, we renew the votes [for] the Latin pop/ballad, a genre that I respect and value immensely and that has marked my life." Fantasía was released for digital download and streaming by Universal Music Latino on the specified date and a solo version of "Falta Amor" was included as the second track. In an interview with Billboard, Yatra chose seven key tracks from the album, including "Falta Amor", and explained the stories behind them. He told the magazine that "Falta Amor" is "a song that is the favorite of many".

During an interview with Billboard Argentina, Yatra described the track as one of his favorites, saying it "sounds super good". He explained in other interviews that he sent it to Ricky Martin months before the album came out, hoping for them to record a collaboration for the album. Three days ahead of the album's release date, Martin wrote back to him and explained that he had been busy at the time, but he loved the song and hoped for a chance to record it together. Thus, Yatra canceled a music video that he had planned to release in two days, and waited for Martin to join him. Yatra explained:

We wrote the song thinking about Ricky, thinking about how perfect his voice would be on it, and thank God it was just magical when both of our voices came together. I'm superexcited, and I think it comes at the right moment. People need music like this right now, and 'Falta Amor' is almost therapeutic.

In an interview with Rolling Stone, Yatra said about collaborating with Martin: "Singing with Ricky Martin is just insane. I would have never thought it possible in [this] lifetime. It's huge not only as a Latino, but for any person that loves music." He also told the Associated Press that Martin raised the track "a lot with his voice". Additionally, Martin stated about the song during an Instagram Live: "Falta Amor brings me back to my beginnings like my song Vuelve. It brings me back to those big ballads that we used to sing back in the day that touched so many people. [...] Falta Amor is that song we need right now. We were supposed to drop this back in January but for some divine reason, it came out now." The re-made version was released as a single for digital download and streaming by Universal Music Latino on March 26, 2020, almost six months after its recording. "Falta Amor" marked the first collaboration between Yatra and Martin. The song was later added to Yatra's compilation extended play Hecho x Sebas: Directo al Corazon (2021).

== Music and lyrics ==
"Falta Amor"
A 20-second sample of the song's chorus, which features elements of Latin pop and pop rock.

Musically, "Falta Amor" is a Spanish language pop rock and Latin pop ballad, with elements of urban. It was written by Colombian musicians Andrés Torres, Mauricio Rengifo, and Yatra. The production was handled by Torres and Rengifo, and the track runs for a total of 3 minutes and 23 seconds. Clarín staff described it as "a ballad of heartbreak, with the fresh sound of Yatra pop".

Lyrically, "Falta Amor", which translates to "Missing Love" in English, is about a man who had a good relationship with his partner, but she suddenly left him. Yatra explained to Billboard that the story behind the song was influenced by a couple close to him. It focuses on a painful statement for a person who refuses to open his heart and let himself be loved, beginning with disappointment. Then, the emotion grows until it reaches the hope of forgiveness and finding a new love. The lyrics include: "Y entre más lo intento, más me cuesta soltarte / No, me duele el vacío que dejas por dentro / Me duele inventarme falsos sentimientos / ¿Cómo viviré con tanto sufrimiento?" (And the more I try, the harder it is for me to let go / No, the emptiness you leave inside hurts / It hurts to invent false feelings / How will I live with so much suffering?)

== Critical reception ==
Upon release, "Falta Amor" was met with widely positive reviews from music critics. Carlos Rerucha from Cadena Dial said the song "was one of those dream collaborations that we all expected" for 2020, and it is "the success we deserved". He described the song as "an intense ballad that does not lose its power neither in the musical nor in the lyrical plane", continuing by praising its verses for piercing the listeners' hearts and reflecting "the pain of a heartbreak that is difficult to overcome". Clarín staff commented that the lyrics "seem to fit in the ravages created by the coronavirus pandemic". Umberto Antonio Olivo from Periodico Daily complimented "Falta Amor", saying "two wonderful voices managed to convey a lot". Univision's Lideny Villatoro wrote about the release of the song: "The most awaited moment arrived." She also expressed her joy with the fact that people can "finally enjoy the talented voices" of Yatra and Martin "in a single song". Suzy Exposito from Rolling Stone labeled it "a soulful revamp" and "an evocative duet", saying Martin "tempers Yatra's heartache with his croon". An author of LatinPop Brasil added, "the new version of the hit" promotes "bringing more love to people, inspiring smiles and good vibes" during the pandemic.

Pip Ellwood-Hughes from Entertainment Focus stated: "The rising star and the legend team up to make some magic." Billboard reviewer Suzette Fernandez said Yatra and Martin joined forces "to revive romantic music with their heartbreaking ballad". She added that the song "brings back the romanticism from the early 2000s". Juan Vicente from Los 40 wrote that the song "can become one of the great ballads of 2020" in its own right, seeing a "wonderful collaboration". Also from Los 40, Olga Reyna stated: "We already needed a ballad like this!" Shock.co staff stated: "Both singers are great pop performers and they make that clear on this track."

=== Accolades ===
Amazon Music ranked "Falta Amor" as the 62nd Best Latin song of 2020, and YouTube Music placed the song on their "Top Latin Pop 2020" playlist of the most streamed songs of the year. The track won the award for Pop Song of the Year (in Spanish) at the 2020 Premios Lo Más Escuchado. It was also nominated for Best Pop Song at the 10th Annual Latino Show Music Awards, but lost to "Los Besos" by Greeicy.

== Commercial performance ==
"Falta Amor" debuted at number 19 on the US Latin Pop Airplay chart on August 15, 2020, becoming Yatra's 20th entry on the chart and Martin's 52nd. The song also extended Martin's own record as the artist with the most top 20s on the chart, with 49 songs. On the US Latin Digital Song Sales chart, it peaked at number seven, becoming Yatra's sixth top 10 hit and Martin's 11th. In March 2021, the song was certified Latin platinum by the Recording Industry Association of America (RIAA), for track-equivalent sales of over 60,000 units in the United States. Besides the US, "Falta Amor" reached the top 10 in Argentina, Costa Rica, and Ecuador, as well as the top 20 in Bolivia, Latin America, and Uruguay.

== Music videos ==
A screenshot from the music video, depicting Yatra and Martin singing the song in a ruined factory.

An animated music video for the solo version was released via Yatra's YouTube channel, upon the release of the album on April 12, 2019. The video depicts a little boy caught on the middle of his parents' expected divorce. On March 24, 2020, Yatra uploaded a teaser for the collaboration's music video along with Martin on YouTube, announcing that it would be released simultaneously with the song on March 26. The video was released on the specified date. It was filmed in Los Angeles, California, and directed by Carlos Perez, who had previously directed the videos for Martin's singles "Tal Vez", "Jaleo", "The Best Thing About Me Is You", "Frío", "Come with Me", "Perdóname", "Fiebre", and "Tiburones (Remix)". In an interview with EFE, Yatra explained "Falta Amor" as the best video he has done in his career, as of March 2020.

The music video depicts Yatra and Martin gently mourn a broken love in an abandoned ruined industrial factory with an old piano and a burning car, fronting a rock band and a group of masked dancers who perform a choreography, writhing across a "wreckage". Shock.co staff labeled the visual "a sober and dark video in which the two interpreters shine", describing it as "pretty artistic". Vicente called the music video "a video clip of great beauty according to the lyrics" of the song. The video was nominated for Best Male Artist Video at the 2020 Premios Quiero. As of July 2022, the video has received over 100 million views on YouTube. On April 10, 2020, an accompanying lyric video was released on Yatra's YouTube channel.

== Live performances and appearances in media ==
In May 2020, Yatra performed "Falta Amor" for Radio Disney's Separados Pero Juntos and MTV's Juntos A Distancia. He launched a challenge with the hashtag #MiCoverFaltaAmor, and several artists recorded their own cover versions of the song for the challenge, such as David Bisbal, Cali y El Dandee, Morat, Reik, Andreew, Izaak, and Mau y Ricky. Most notably, Argentine singer and Yatra's then-girlfriend Tini shared her own version on April 25, 2020. Besides the challenge, the track has also been covered by contestants on music talent shows. Isai Reyes performed the track on the second season of American singing competition television series La Voz in 2020. In the same year, Alex Sevilla and Kaii Jiménez competed in a battle of covering the song on season nine of La Voz Mexico in 2020, which Sevilla won.

== Track listing ==
Digital download / streaming
No.	Title	Length
1.	"Falta Amor"	3:23

== Credits and personnel ==
Credits adapted from Tidal.

- Sebastián Yatra – vocal, composer, lyricist
- Ricky Martin – vocal
- Andrés Torres – composer, lyricist, producer
- Mauricio Rengifo – composer, lyricist, producer

== Charts ==
=== Weekly charts ===
Weekly peak performance for "Falta Amor"
Chart (2020)	Peak position
Argentina Hot 100 (Billboard)	48
Argentina (Monitor Latino)	5
Bolivia (Monitor Latino)	16
Chile (Monitor Latino)	16
Colombia (National-Report)	80
Costa Rica (Monitor Latino)	6
Dominican Republic Pop (Monitor Latino)	6
Ecuador (National-Report)	4
Latin America (Monitor Latino)	12
Mexico (Billboard Mexican Airplay)	47
Panama Pop (Monitor Latino)	1
Paraguay Pop (Monitor Latino)	8
Peru Pop (Monitor Latino)	7
Puerto Rico Pop (Monitor Latino)	11
Uruguay (Monitor Latino)	16
US Latin Digital Song Sales (Billboard)	7
US Latin Pop Airplay (Billboard)	19

=== Year-end charts ===
2020 year-end chart performance for "Falta Amor"
Chart (2020)	Position
Argentina (Monitor Latino)	31
Bolivia Latin (Monitor Latino)	99
Chile Pop (Monitor Latino)	83
Costa Rica (Monitor Latino)	47
Dominican Republic Pop (Monitor Latino)	24
Ecuador (Monitor Latino)	95
Honduras Pop (Monitor Latino)	58
Latin America (Monitor Latino)	99
Mexico Pop (Monitor Latino)	63
Panama Pop (Monitor Latino)	43
Paraguay Pop (Monitor Latino)	48
Peru Pop (Monitor Latino)	48
Puerto Rico Pop (Monitor Latino)	46
Uruguay (Monitor Latino)	71
Venezuela Pop (Monitor Latino)	77

2021 year-end chart performance for "Falta Amor"
Chart (2021)	Position
Argentina Latino (Monitor Latino)	85
Honduras Pop (Monitor Latino)	71

== Certifications ==
Certifications and sales for "Falta Amor"
Region	Certification	Certified units/sales
United States (RIAA)	Platinum (Latin)	60,000^{‡}
^{‡} Sales+streaming figures based on certification alone.

== Release history ==
Release dates and formats for "Falta Amor"
Region	Date	Format(s)	Label	Ref.
Various	March 26, 2020	Digital download; streaming	Universal Music Latino	
Latin America	March 27, 2020	Contemporary hit radio	Universal Music Latino	
