= Tiburones =

2020 single by Ricky Martin

Single by Ricky Martin

from the EP Pausa
- Language: Spanish
- English title: "Sharks"
- Released: January 23, 2020
- Recorded: 2019
- Genre: Latin pop
- Length: 3:14
- Label: Sony Latin
- Songwriters: Oscar Hernandez; Pablo Preciado
- Producer: Julio Reyes Copello

Ricky Martin singles chronology
"Cántalo" (2019)	"Tiburones" (2020)	"Falta Amor" (2020)

Music video
- "Tiburones" on YouTube

"Tiburones" (transl. "Sharks") is a song recorded by Puerto Rican singer Ricky Martin for his first extended play, Pausa (2020). The song was written by Oscar Hernandez and Pablo Preciado, while the production was handled by Julio Reyes Copello. The song was released for digital download and streaming by Sony Music Latin on January 23, 2020, as the second single from the extended play. A Spanish language ballad and Latin pop song, it is about the importance of peace, love and unity. It received positive reviews from music critics, who complimented its lyrics.

"Tiburones" was nominated for Song of the Year at the 21st Annual Latin Grammy Awards. The song was commercially successful in Latin America, reaching number one in Argentina and Puerto Rico, as well as the top 10 in eight other Latin American countries. Additionally, it became Martin's 49th entry on US Hot Latin Songs chart, making him the first and only artist in history to enter the chart in five different decades. The accompanying high concept music video was directed by Puerto Rican director Kacho Lopez and filmed in Caguas, Puerto Rico. It depicts a citizen protest that will turn into a celebration at the end and is an ode to both LGBT community and women's rights. Billboard ranked it among the "22 Latin Music Videos to Celebrate Pride Month".

To promote the song, Martin performed it on several television programs and award shows, including the 2020 Lo Nuestro Awards and the 2020 Latin Grammy Awards. For further promotion, Spotify promoted the release on billboards in Times Square. Several artists have recorded their own cover version of the song, most notably Reik. A remix of the original with Puerto Rican singer Farruko was released on April 10, 2020. A few weeks later, Martin and him released a music video for the remix, which was directed by Carlos Perez.

== Background and development ==
Martin started recording his eleventh studio album, initially titled Movimiento, in the second half of 2019, inspired by the 2019 political protests in Puerto Rico. On October 29, 2019, during an interview with Entertainment Weekly, he confirmed that the album was set to include three ballads. On December 11, 2019, Martin was seen in Caguas, filming a music video. Though it was rumored to be a music video for Ricky Martin's latest song, "Cántalo", it was later announced as being a video for his next single. On December 23, 2019, El Nuevo Día revealed the single's name in an article and mentioned that it is a ballad song set for release in January. On December 24, coinciding with his 48th birthday, Martin shared three photos from the music video on Instagram and confirmed that "Tiburones" would be released in early 2020. Nine days later, in an interview with Metro Puerto Rico, Martin told the newspaper about the song: "It's a very unique ballad that has never been heard before." He also clarified that the ballad is romantic and does not refer to political issues:

All I want is to talk about love. The public knows what they feel and what they don't feel when they are in love and when they're dealing with the process of ending a relationship. What we have achieved with the Puerto Rican cinematographer Kacho López, it doesn't matter if you are from Puerto Rico or not, you will identify yourself. It is love with good taste, it is a celebration and we did it here in Puerto Rico. I think it's one of those ballads that people will be asking me for many years.

== Release and promotion ==
On January 23, 2020, Martin shared the artwork for the single on his social media and announced that it would be released within a few hours. The song was released for digital download and streaming by Sony Music Latin on the specified date. Because of the COVID-19 pandemic and subsequent personal experiences, Martin decided to split the album Movimiento into the two EPs Pausa and Play. "Tiburones" was included as the fifth track on his debut EP Pausa, released May 28, 2020. For further promotion, Spotify promoted the song on billboards in Times Square. On June 23, 2020, an accompanying lyric video was released on Ricky Martin's YouTube channel. A headphone mix of the song, created using "Orbital Audio" technology, was included as the fifth track on the headphone mix version of the EP, released July 30, 2020.

== Composition and lyrics ==
"Tiburones"
A 15-second sample of the chorus, which features a "chill" and "relaxed" melody.

Musically, "Tiburones" is a Spanish language ballad and Latin pop song, written by Mexican singer-songwriter Pablo Preciado and his Venezuelan co-writer Oscar Hernandez. The song runs for a total of 3 minutes and 14 seconds, and features a very slow and calm rhythm that moves away from it in great strides. Throughout the song, Martin sings about love and unity, and reproves wasting time in fighting about things that are not important, and it focuses on the permanent and limitless love between a couple. Tomás Mier from People described the song as an "optimism-filled" track.

Hernandez described the song as "very emotional", and told Billboard about the lyrics, saying it "talks about the union of two who should never waste time in fights", going on to call it "a proposal to change directions, plans and ideas, with the simple reason of moving forward, together. And at any cost 'for you whatever, swim with sharks'." Also, Martin told L'Officiel Hommes about it: "This song is a metaphor about the frustration of my people, describing the things we would be willing to do to be together, to survive, we might even think about swimming allegorically with the tiburones, aka sharks. Unfortunately this is a global problem not only in Puerto Rico, we must fight and unite for justice to triumph."

== Critical reception ==
Upon release, "Tiburones" was met with universal acclaim from music critics. Suzette Fernandez from Billboard gave the song a positive review, saying it is "a powerful song that promotes peace, love, unity and acceptance". Umberto Antonio Olivo from Periodico Daily described the song as an "exciting piece whose lyrics openly take sides against all forms of war and violence". Idolator's Mike Wass ranked "Tiburones" as one of Martin's best ballads, calling him an "enduring hitmaker". Josh Mendez from Monitor Latino labeled it "a great pop ballad with a beautiful and at the same time impressive message".

Writing for Start Up Mexico Magazine, Azenet Folch praised "Tiburones", saying: "This is a beautiful ballad with a clear message of love, togetherness and, most of all, acceptance. The lyrics and melody are deeply connected by the artist's interpretation with that unmistakable vocal stamp that maintains him as one of the most important stars in the musical field." An author of Ritmo Romántica complimented the track, labeling it "a romantic song, that beyond telling a love story as a couple, tells us about the emotional bond that is created between compatriots when they fight against the excesses of the government". Tionah Lee from ¡Hola! described "Tiburones" as a "powerful song" and a "powerful ballad". Los 40's Laura Coca gave it a positive review, saying it is "a ballad with a message of love that serves as a denouncement against hatred that ends up separating people".

=== Accolades ===
Spotify ranked "Tiburones" as one of the Best Latin Songs of 2020, and Amazon Music ranked it as the 16th Best Latin song of the year. YouTube Music placed the song on their "Top Latin Pop 2020" playlist. ¡Hola! listed it among the "Ten Perfect Songs to Make Valentine's Day the Most Romantic Day of the Year". The track was nominated for Song of the Year at the 21st Annual Latin Grammy Awards, but lost to "René" by Residente. It was also nominated for Pop Song of the Year at the 2021 Lo Nuestro Awards, and Favorite Pop Song at the 2021 Latin American Music Awards.

== Commercial performance ==
"Tiburones" became Martin's 49th entry on the US Hot Latin Songs chart, debuting at number 44 in February 2020, and peaking at number 34 in May 2020. Thus he became the first and only artist in history to enter the chart across five decades, including his work as part of Menudo. "Tiburones" also entered the Latin Pop Airplay chart at number 25, becoming Martin's 50th entry, and later peaked at number 9 in the week ending March 29, becoming his 38th top 10 on the chart. Therefore, Martin broke away from a two-way tie with Shakira for the runner-up slot of most top 10s, coming behind only Enrique Iglesias. The song also extended his own record as the artist with most top 20s on the chart, with 47 songs.

Besides the United States, "Tiburones" reached number one in Puerto Rico for three consecutive weeks, and became the first solo song ever to top the country's year-end chart. It also reached number one in Argentina, and peaked in the top 10 of Chile, Costa Rica, Ecuador, El Salvador, Mexico, Panama, Paraguay, and Uruguay. In Bolivia and on the Monitor Latino Latin America chart, it reached the top 20. In Mexico, the song was certified double platinum by the Asociación Mexicana de Productores de Fonogramas y Videogramas (AMPROFON), for track-equivalent sales of over 120,000 units.

== Music video ==
A screenshot from the music video, depicting Martin walking in front of an armored vehicle.

On January 23, 2020, Martin shared snippets of the accompanying music video and announced that it would be released within a few hours. The visual was released alongside the song on the specified date. The video was filmed in Caguas, Puerto Rico, and directed by Puerto Rican director Kacho Lopez, who had also directed the videos for previous Martin singles "Jaleo" and "Tal Vez". The clip shows Martin wearing a black singlet walking in front of an armored vehicle, while police in riot gear confront apparent citizen protests. As Martin starts singing, a woman with a green scarf around her neck leads the protests. Martin stated that it was the actress’ idea to wear the scarf. At the end, the protests turn into a celebration, and the police drop their helmets and weapons to join people in the celebration. Brent Furdyk from Entertainment Tonight Canada described the music video as powerful.

In an interview, Martin said that what he wanted with the visual was to "capture a very universal story", and that's the reason that he wanted to film the music video in his native Puerto Rico. He also mentioned: "Both the song and the video embody all the emotions, energy and feel, which are emblematic of when we come together as people." The music video features diversity in sexual orientations, and the green scarf around the actress' neck symbolizes the fight for women's rights to have abortions. Martin explained, "What I've always wanted is a woman to have the right to do whatever she wants with her body, I'm always going to defend that". Billboard staff listed the music video among the "22 Latin Music Videos to Celebrate Pride Month" in 2022. It was nominated for Video with a Purpose at the 2020 Premios Juventud, and Best Melodic Video at the 2020 Premios Quiero.

== Live performances and appearances in media ==
"Tiburones" was included on Martin's the Movimiento Tour, which began at the José Miguel Agrelot Coliseum in San Juan, Puerto Rico on February 7, 2020. On February 20, 2020, he performed the song at the Lo Nuestro Awards as the opening act, which was ranked as one of the best performances of the ceremony by Entertainment Tonight. Ricky Martin also performed "Tiburones" along with his other hits during the 61st Viña del Mar International Song Festival on February 23, 2020. Later that year, he performed "Recuerdo" and "Tiburones" at the Latin Grammy Awards on November 19. The latter included children appeared behind him on surrounding visuals during the performance of the song, and carried the message of unity. His performance was ranked as one of the best performances of that night by Entertainment Tonight.

Mexican band Reik recorded their own version of "Tiburones". The cover was recorded during the COVID-19 pandemic, with the three members recording from different parts of the world. An accompanying music video was released via the band's YouTube channel on May 20, 2020. Argentine singer Emilia recorded a cover version of "Tiburones", which Martin shared to his Instagram Stories. Argentine duo MYA recorded an acoustic cover version of the song, sharing its video with their followers via Instagram on April 11, 2020. "Tiburones" was featured in the American romantic comedy-drama television series The Baker and the Beauty (2020).

== Remix ==
"Tiburones Remix"

Single by Ricky Martin and Farruko
- Language: Spanish
- English title: "Sharks"
- Released: April 10, 2020
- Length: 3:29
- Label: Sony Latin
- Songwriters: Sharo Towers; Farruko; Pablo Preciado; Oscar Hernandez; Franklin Jovani Martinez
- Producer: Sharo Towers

Farruko singles chronology
"Si Me Dices Que Sí Remix" (2020)	"Tiburones Remix" (2020)	"Perreo Intenso" (2020)

Music video
- "Tiburones Remix" on YouTube

On April 10, 2020, Martin released a remix of "Tiburones", with Puerto Rican singer Farruko. The remix marked the second collaboration between Martin and Farruko, following "Perdóname" remix. On April 9, 2020, they shared the artwork for the remix on their social media. In an interview with Billboard, Farruko told about the collaboration:

It's an honor for me to do this, I admire what you do and I've always followed your career. I'm so happy to share this beautiful song with you that motivates people to put their hands up and leave violence behind and to hug each other during difficult times.

A few days after the remix with Farruko was released, Puerto Rican singer Ozuna explained that Martin had excluded him from the remix of the song: "I had made the song 'Tiburones', the original was with me. I don't know what happened, I had my problems. It was before I had all my personal affairs. I do not know if it was that he changed his perspective and his impression with me, perhaps he said 'this is not the Ozuna that I knew before', after the situations that I had. I respect that, I was very interested in the song, another style of rhythm, we put the seasoning on it, we put a lot of things into it." he said exclusively to the YouTube channel MoluscoTV. Ozuna's pornographic video was leaked in 2019 and he was also accused of ordering the killing of Kevin Fret by Fret's mother during an interview on Conexión Samantha Love.

"I was very sad when I saw that I didn't appear in the song, but it was not annoying or something like this, I respect Ricky a lot", Ozuna declared publicly. After he could not participate in "Tiburones", Ozuna told El Break de las 7 that he did not lose faith of making a musical collaboration with Martin. In addition, he assured that he loves the theme of Martin and Farruko, and that he listens to it constantly.

=== Reception and promotion ===
Griselda Flores from Billboard gave the remix a positive review, saying: "The upbeat remix gives the already hit song a new life with urban-tinged beats and Farruko's distinctive vocals and rhymes." On May 7, 2020, Martin and Farruko released a music video for the remix. The black-and-white music video was filmed at the singer's respective homes, on their phones, because of COVID-19 pandemic restrictions. Martin recorded his scenes in Los Angeles, while Farruko's were shot in Puerto Rico. The visual was directed by Carlos Perez, who had also directed the videos for Martin singles "Tal Vez", "Jaleo", "The Best Thing About Me Is You", "Frío", "Come with Me", "Perdóname", "Fiebre", and his latest song, "Falta Amor". He worked on the video from Miami. The accompanying lyric video was released on Martin's YouTube channel the same day as the remix.

=== Credits and personnel ===
Credits adapted from Tidal.

- Ricky Martin – vocals, associated performer
- Farruko – vocals, associated performer, composer, lyricist
- Sharo Towers – producer, composer, lyricist, mixing engineer, recording engineer
- Oscar Hernández – composer, lyricist
- Pablo Preciado – composer, lyricist
- Franklin Jovani Martinez – composer, lyricist
- Amber Rubi Urena – A&R coordinator
- Isabel De Jesús – A&R director
- Julio Reyes Copello – co-producer, recording engineer
- Mike Fuller – mastering engineer
- Carlos Fernando López – recording engineer
- Enrique Larreal – recording engineer
- Nicolás De La Espriella – recording engineer

== Track listings ==
Digital download / streaming
No.	Title	Length
1.	"Tiburones"	3:14

Digital download / streaming
No.	Title	Length
1.	"Tiburones (Remix)"	3:29

== Credits and personnel ==
Credits adapted from Tidal.

- Ricky Martin – vocals, associated performer
- Julio Reyes Copello – producer, misc. producer, performance arranger, programmer, recording engineer
- Oscar Hernández – composer, lyricist
- Pablo Preciado – composer, lyricist
- Karina Pagán – A&R coordinator
- Isabel De Jesús – A&R director
- Enrique Larreal – recording engineer
- Matt Tuggle – assistant engineer
- Dan Warner – guitar
- Nicolás De La Espriella – keyboards, programmer, recording engineer
- Gene Grimaldi – mastering engineer
- Trevor Muzzi – mixing engineer
- Carlos Fernando López – performance arranger, programmer, recording engineer
- Manuela López – violoncello
- Lambuley – violoncello
- Natalia Ramírez – vocal producer
- Jean Rodríguez – vocal producer

== Charts ==
=== Weekly charts ===
Weekly peak performance for "Tiburones"
Chart (2020–2021)	Peak position
Argentina Hot 100 (Billboard)	57
Argentina (Monitor Latino)	1
Bolivia (Monitor Latino)	15
Chile (Monitor Latino)	8
Colombia (National-Report)	75
Costa Rica (Monitor Latino)	3
Dominican Republic Pop (Monitor Latino)	2
Ecuador (National-Report)	6
El Salvador (Monitor Latino)	8
Honduras Pop (Monitor Latino)	8
Latin America (Monitor Latino)	15
Mexico (Billboard Mexican Airplay)	11
Mexico (Monitor Latino)	10
Panama (Monitor Latino)	3
Paraguay (Monitor Latino)	5
Peru Pop (Monitor Latino)	7
Puerto Rico (Monitor Latino)	1
Uruguay (Monitor Latino)	4
US Hot Latin Songs (Billboard)	34
US Latin Airplay (Billboard)	12
US Latin Pop Airplay (Billboard)	9
Venezuela Pop (Monitor Latino)	4

=== Year-end charts ===
2020 year-end chart performance for "Tiburones"
Chart (2020)	Position
Argentina (Monitor Latino)	14
Bolivia (Monitor Latino)	31
Chile (Monitor Latino)	33
Costa Rica (Monitor Latino)	15
Dominican Republic (Monitor Latino)	77
Ecuador (Monitor Latino)	47
El Salvador (Monitor Latino)	34
Guatemala (Monitor Latino)	95
Honduras Pop (Monitor Latino)	46
Latin America (Monitor Latino)	30
Mexico (Monitor Latino)	64
Panama (Monitor Latino)	32
Paraguay (Monitor Latino)	32
Puerto Rico (Monitor Latino)	1
Uruguay (Monitor Latino)	11
US Latin Airplay (Billboard)	39
US Latin Pop Airplay (Billboard)	36
Venezuela (Monitor Latino)	53

2021 year-end chart performance for "Tiburones"
Chart (2021)	Position
Argentina (Monitor Latino)	96
Bolivia (Monitor Latino)	100
Chile Pop (Monitor Latino)	32
Dominican Republic Pop (Monitor Latino)	39
Panama Pop (Monitor Latino)	19
Paraguay Pop (Monitor Latino)	79
Puerto Rico Pop (Monitor Latino)	32
Uruguay (Monitor Latino)	66
Venezuela Pop (Monitor Latino)	90

== Certifications ==
Certifications and sales for "Tiburones"
Region	Certification	Certified units/sales
Mexico (AMPROFON)	2× Platinum	120,000^{‡}
^{‡} Sales+streaming figures based on certification alone.

== Release history ==
Release dates and formats for "Tiburones"
Region	Date	Format(s)	Version	Label	Ref.
Various	January 23, 2020	Digital download; streaming	Original	Sony Music Latin	
Latin America	January 24, 2020	Contemporary hit radio	Original	Sony Music Latin	
Spain	January 24, 2020	Contemporary hit radio	Original	Sony Music Latin	
United States	January 24, 2020	Contemporary hit radio	Original	Sony Music Latin	
Russia	January 28, 2020	Contemporary hit radio	Original	Sony Music Latin	
Various	April 10, 2020	Digital download; streaming	Remix	Sony Music Latin	

== See also ==
- List of number-one songs of 2020 (Puerto Rico)
