= Pausa (EP) =

EP by Ricky Martin
- Released: May 28, 2020
- Recorded: 2019–2020
- Studios: Barcelona; Dominican Republic; Los Angeles; Miami; New York; Paris; Puerto Rico
- Length: 21:05
- Language: Spanish
- Label: Sony Latin
- Producers: Julio Reyes Copello; Nicolas de la Espriella; Alejandro Jimenez; Demian Jimenez; Ricky Martin; Montana; Raül Refree; Residente; Trooko

Ricky Martin chronology
Esencial (2018)	Pausa (2020)	Play (2022)

Singles from Pausa
- 1. "Cántalo" Released: November 12, 2019; 2. "Tiburones" Released: January 23, 2020

Pausa (Spanish for 'Pause') is the first extended play by Puerto Rican singer Ricky Martin. It was released on May 28, 2020, through Sony Latin. Pausa is the first studio release by Martin since his 2015 studio album, A Quien Quiera Escuchar. Originally planned as a full-length album, Martin changed the concept following the spread of the COVID-19 pandemic and his experience with panic attacks. He split the album into two EP's, Pausa which consists of slower songs and ballads and Play which is set to include more up-tempo songs. The EP features six songs, out of which, five are collaborations with Sting, Carla Morrison, Pedro Capó and Bad Bunny among others.

Following its release, Pausa charted at number eight on the US Latin Pop Albums chart. It was promoted with two singles, "Cántalo", with Bad Bunny and Residente, and "Tiburones". The latter became Martin's 49th entry on US Hot Latin Songs charts, making him the first and only artist in history to enter the chart in five different decades. Additionally, it became his 50th entry on the US Latin Pop Airplay chart. Pausa was nominated for Album Of The Year and won Best Pop Vocal Album at the 21st Annual Latin Grammy Awards. It also has been nominated for Best Latin Pop or Urban Album at the 63rd Annual Grammy Awards.

== Background and development ==
In 2015 Martin released his tenth studio album, A Quien Quiera Escuchar. The album spawned four singles, including the international hit, "La Mordidita"; it became Martin's twenty-sixth top ten hit on the US Hot Latin Songs chart making him the fourth artist with the most top tens in the history of the chart. At the 58th Annual Grammy Awards, A Quien Quiera Escuchar won the award for Best Latin Pop Album. In 2016, Martin released, "Vente Pa' Ca", a collaboration with Colombian singer Maluma. It became Martin's 16th number-one single on the US Latin Airplay chart and topped the charts in eight other countries. Two years later, he released another collaboration, "Fiebre", featuring Wisin & Yandel; it received a platinum certification (Latin) from the Recording Industry Association of America (RIAA) for moving over 60,000 units in the US.

I think it is a time when the world is asking us – the cosmos, God, as you want to see it – is asking us to pause and go home. So I see it, I am an artist and this is my defense mechanism.

— Martin explaining the idea and concept for Pausa.

In January 2020, Martin announced the release of his eleventh studio album, initially titled Movimiento. The record was supposed to be inspired by Puerto Rico's recent history including Hurricane Maria in 2017, the 2019 political protests and the 2019–20 earthquakes. However, following the spread of COVID-19 pandemic, Martin started experiencing panic attacks, "I spent two weeks with a poker face so my family wouldn't be affected, but finally I was able to raise my head and say ‘eh, something very good has to come out of this, get creative.’ And I started making music and it was my medicine, honestly, because I really felt like I was gasping for air." Subsequently, he contacted his label, Sony, and decided to split the album in two extended plays, Pausa and Play. Martin described the former as more "chill" and "relaxed", while the latter will consist of more upbeat songs. Pausa was released on May 28, 2020, while Play would be slated for a September release, though the Play release did not occur yet. Martin's husband, Jwan Yosef, shot the artwork for Pausa; it features the singer's naked back.

== Recording and composition ==
Pausa consists of six songs, five out of which are collaborations. Musicians featured on the EP include, English singer Sting, Mexican singer-songwriter Carla Morrison, Spain Romani flamenco singer Diego el Cigala and Puerto Rican artists Pedro Capó, Residente and Bad Bunny. Regarding his collaboration with Morrison, Martin stated, "It's the singer's sound, her storytelling, her tone, the way she writes. I love her. I love her stories." Martin's sound engineer Enrique Larreal, based in New York, helped record the material with the other artists being based in London, Paris, Puerto Rico, and the Dominican Republic, "My engineer was able to create a system where everyone — my producer in Miami, me in L.A. — had a sharp, immaculate audiovisual experience. I can be recording and literally see in my laptop the movement he is making in his console table in New York." Inspired by the singer's fears, insecurities, and panic moments he experienced during quarantine, Griselda Flores of Billboard described the lyrics as "introspective", "poignant" and "melancholic".

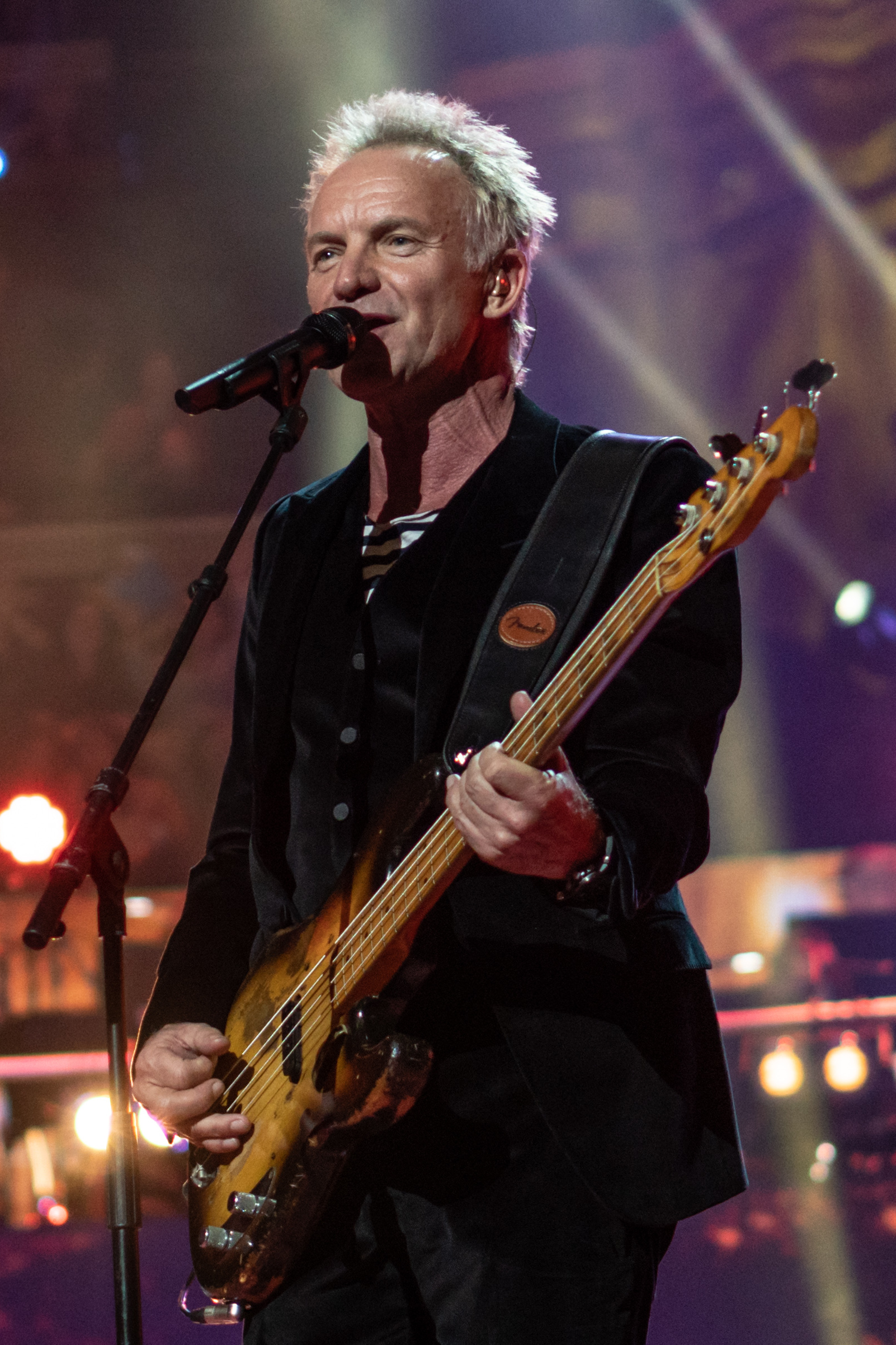
English singer and musician Sting sings on the opening track, "Simple".

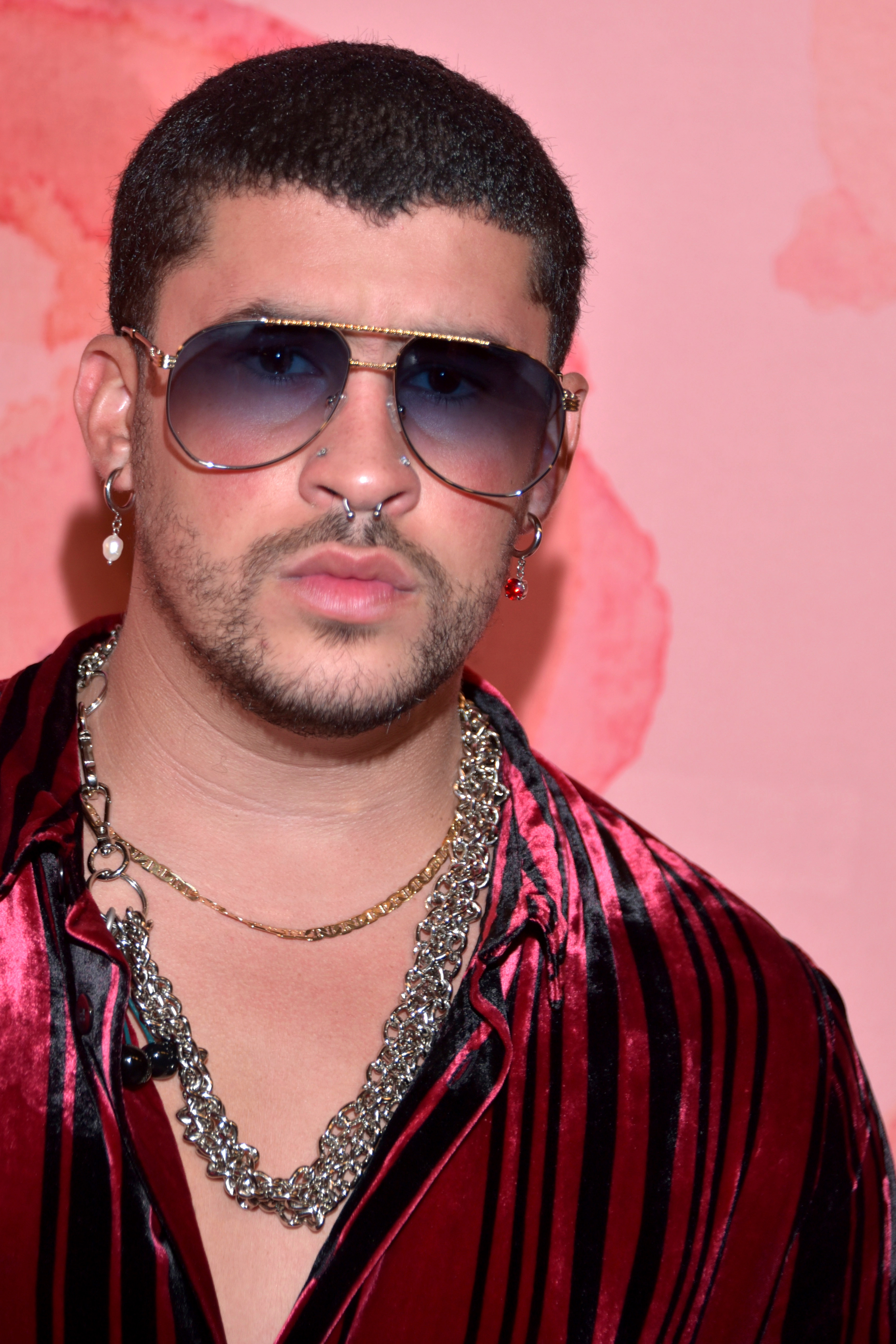
Puerto Rican rapper Bad Bunny is one of the featured artists on "Cántalo".

The EP opens with "Simple" a collaboration with Sting, described by Flores as "simple yet forceful and grand". Martin contacted Sting who accepted the duet-offer and decided to sing in Spanish, "I [Martin] called him [Sting] stepping out of my comfort zone because I don't really like asking people and he said yes, to send him whatever I had and he liked what I sent him. It's a dream come true." "Recuerdo", the collaboration with Morrison, is an emotional song with "heart-wrenching" lyrics. According to Martin, the song came out of a rough moment and sadness he and Morisson were experiencing when they wrote it. Elias Leight of Rolling Stone, regarding "Recuerdo", wrote that the singers showcase "complementary vocal styles"; Morrison has more "light and lilting", while Martin opts for a "creamier, more forceful approach".

"Cae de Una", a duet with Capó, has an "infectious" beat, with a light melodic tune and "heartbreak" lyrical content. "Quiéreme" is a "flamenco-tinged" pop song and was co-produced by Spanish musician Raül Refree in Barcelona. Refree turned the melody to "an explosion of sounds" on which Martin and Cigala trade "dramatic and powerful vocals". "Tiburones" is an emotional ballad co-written by Pablo Preciado and Oscar Hernandez. It contains deep lyrics that advocate for peace, love, unity, and acceptance. "Cántalo" is the only exception on the album tempo-wise and features a variety of genres including salsa, reggaeton and trap. It is based on the original master of Hector Lavoe's 1974 song, "Mi Gente". A collaboration with Residente and Bad Bunny, it was inspired by the #RickyRenuncia movement (a campaign against former Puerto Rican governor, Ricardo Rosselló) and includes lyrics like, "Nobody stops us today/ Not even with elephant soothing/ Money, although abundant, it is not worth."

== Singles ==
"Cántalo" was released as the first single from Pausa on November 12, 2019. Its artwork was inspired by the protest posters issued in Puerto Rico during the riots that demanded the resignation of Roselló. Commercially, it reached number 35 on the US Hot Latin Songs chart and was certified Latin gold by the RIAA, for moving over 30,000 units in the country. Martin alongside Residente and Bad Bunny performed "Cántalo" at the 20th Annual Latin Grammy Awards held on November 14, 2019, in Las Vegas.

"Tiburones" was released on January 23, 2020, as the second single from the EP. It became Martin's 49th entry on US Hot Latin Songs charts, where it peaked at number 34 in May 2020. With this feat, he became the first and only artist in history to enter the chart in five different decades. "Tiburones" also became the singer's 50th entry on the Latin Pop Airplay. It peaked at number nine and became Martin's 38th top-ten single on the chart. Additionally, topped the Monitor Latino singles chart in Puerto Rico for three consecutive weeks and reached the top 10 in nine other countries. Kacho Lopez filmed the music video for the song in Puerto Rico. According to Martin, "Both the song and the video embody all the emotions, energy and feel, which are emblematic of when we come together as people." Martin performed the song at the Lo Nuestro Awards on February 20, 2020. The song was nominated for "Song Of the Year" at the 21st Annual Latin Grammy Awards where Martin also gave it a performance along with his song "Recuerdo". An official remix of "Tiburones", featuring singer Farruko, was released on April 10, 2020.

On July 23, 2020, "Recuerdo" released as the only promotional single from the extended play. Billboard picked the song as one of the Best Female/Male Latin Collaborations of 2020 and one of the most beautiful ballads released that year. The song reached the top 10 in Martin's native Puerto Rico and became his third top 10 hit in the country from his EP.

== Critical reception ==
Griselda Flores from Billboard gave the extended play a positive review, saying: "Packed with introspective, poignant and melancholic lyrics, the six-track set is born from a state of vulnerability and the need to heal through music."

It was also ranked as one of the Best Latin Albums of 2020 by Billboard.

== Awards and nominations ==
Year	Ceremony	Award	Result	Ref.
2020	Latin Grammy Awards	Album of the Year	Nominated	
2020	Latin Grammy Awards	Best Pop Vocal Album	Won	
2020	FM DOS Awards	Album of the Year	Nominated	
2020	Premios lo Mas	Male Spanish Pop Album	Nominated	
2021	Grammy Awards	Best Latin Pop or Urban Album	Nominated	
2021	Premio Lo Nuestro	Pop Album of the Year	Nominated	
2021	GLAAD Media Awards	Outstanding Music Artist	Nominated	

== Track listing ==
Pausa track listing
No.	Title	Writer(s)	Producer(s)	Length
1.	"Simple" (with Sting)	Ricky Martin; Danay Suárez; Alberto Lozada Algarín; Ender Zambrano; Gordon Sumner	Montana; Martin; Jean Rodríguez^{[a]}	3:35
2.	"Recuerdo" (with Carla Morrison)	Carla Patricia Morrison Flores; Alejandro Jimenez; Demian Jimenez; Chiara Stroia; Martin	A. Jimenez; D. Jimenez; Rodríguez^{[a]}	3:52
3.	"Cae de Una" (with Pedro Capó)	Pedro Capó; Gabriel Edgar González Pérez; Martin	Julio Reyes Copello; Nicolas "Na 'vi" de la Espriella; George Noriega^{[a]}; Rodríguez^{[a]}	3:39
4.	"Quiéreme" (with Diego el Cigala)	Martin; Algarín; Beatriz Luengo; Yotuel Romero	Montana; Raül Refree; Rodríguez^{[a]}	3:06
5.	"Tiburones"	Oscar Hernández; Pablo Preciado	Copello; Rodríguez^{[a]}; Natalia Ramírez^{[a]}	3:14
6.	"Cántalo" (with Residente and Bad Bunny)	Martin; Benito Antonio Martínez Ocasio; René Pérez; Suárez; Rubén Blades; Johnny Pacheco	Residente; Trooko; Rodríguez^{[a]}	3:39
Total length:				21:05

Headphone Mix
No.	Title	Writer(s)	Producer(s)	Length
1.	"Simple" (headphone mix) (with Sting)	Martin; Suárez; Algarín; Zambrano; Sumner	Montana; Martin; Rodríguez^{[a]}	3:34
2.	"Recuerdo" (headphone mix) (with Carla Morrison)	Flores; Jimenez; Jimenez; Stroia; Martin	A. Jimenez; D. Jimenez; Rodríguez^{[a]}	3:52
3.	"Cae de Una" (headphone mix) (with Pedro Capó)	Capó; Pérez; Martin	Copello; Espriella; Noriega^{[a]}; Rodríguez^{[a]}	3:42
4.	"Quiéreme" (headphone mix) (with Diego el Cigala)	Martin; Algarín; Luengo; Romero	Montana; Refree; Rodríguez^{[a]}	3:03
5.	"Tiburones" (headphone mix)	Hernández; Preciado	Copello; Rodríguez^{[a]}; Ramírez^{[a]}	3:15
6.	"Cántalo" (headphone mix) (with Residente and Bad Bunny)	Martin; Ocasio; Pérez; Suárez; Blades; Pacheco	Residente; Trooko; Rodríguez^{[a]}	3:38
7.	"Mi Sangre" (headphone mix) (featuring Neha Mahajan)	Algarín; Suárez; Ender Zambrano; Martin	Montana; Martin; Suárez^{[a]}; Zambrano^{[a]}	3:30
Total length:				24:34

=== Notes ===
- ^{^a} signifies a vocal producer

== Personnel ==
- Ricky Martin – composer, executive producer, producer, writer, vocals
- Alberto Lozada Algarín – composer, producer, writer
- Ender Zambrano – composer, writer
- Sting – composer, writer, vocals
- Carla Patricia Morrison Flores – writer, vocals
- Alejandro Jimenez – composer, recording engineer, vocal producer, writer
- Demian Jimenez – composer, writer
- Chiara Stroia – composer
- Jean Rodríguez – vocal producer
- Pedro Capó – composer, vocals, writer
- Gabriel Edgar "Rec808" González Pérez – composer, guitar, recording engineer, writer
- Julio Reyes Copello – keyboards, performance arranger, programmer, producer, recording engineer
- Nicolas "Na 'vi" de la Espriella – keyboards, performance arranger, programmer, producer, recording engineer
- George Noriega – vocal producer
- Beatriz Luengo – composer, writer
- Yotuel Romero – composer, writer
- Diego el Cigala – vocals
- Raül Refree – acoustic guitar, programmer, producer, recording engineer, synthesizer,
- Oscar Hernández – writer
- Pablo Preciado – writer
- Natalia Ramírez – vocal producer
- Benito Antonio "Bad Bunny" Martínez Ocasio – vocals, writer
- René "Residente" Pérez – composer, producer, vocals, writer
- Danay Suárez – background vocals, composer, writer
- Rubén Blades – writer
- Johnny Pacheco – writer
- Trooko – producer, recording engineer
- Rafa Arcaute – recording engineer
- José Ricardo Lugo – bass
- Carlos Valencia – cello
- Jorge Laboy – guitar
- Felipe Tichauer – mastering engineer
- Gustavo Celis – mixing engineer
- Richard Bravo – percussion
- Héctor Iván Rosao – recording engineer
- Karlo Floreso – violin
- Bart Schoudelo – vocal engineer
- Christian J. Pérez – vocal engineer
- Donal Hodgson – vocal engineer
- Enrique Larreal – recording engineer, vocal engineer
- Francisco "Paco" Aldonado – assistant engineer
- Jaycen Joshua – mixing engineer
- Ela Taubert – background vocals, percussion
- Natalia Schlesinger – background vocals, percussion, recording engineer
- Daniel Uribe – guitar, recording engineer
- Nicolás Ramírez – percussion, recording engineer
- Yamil Otero – viola
- Alen Saucedo – vocal engineer
- Alberto Sánchez – vocal engineer
- Matt Tuggle – assistant engineer
- Dan Warner – guitar
- Gene Grimaldi – mastering engineer
- Trevor Muzzy – mixing engineer
- Carlos Fernando López – performance arranger, recording engineer
- Manuela López Lambuley – violloncelo
- Carmela Ramírez – background vocals
- Rubén Blades – background vocals
- Tito Allen – background vocals
- Ted Jensen – mastering engineer
- Tom Elmhirst – mixing engineer
- Leo Genovese – piano
- Luis Quintero – timbales
- Rey Alejandre – trombone

== Charts ==
Chart performance for Pausa
Chart (2020)	Peak position
Spanish Albums (PROMUSICAE)	79
US Latin Pop Albums (Billboard)	8

== Release history ==
Release formats for Pausa
Region	Date	Format(s)	Label	Ref.
United States	May 28, 2020	Digital download; streaming	Sony Music Latin	
Various	May 29, 2020	Digital download; streaming	Sony Music Latin	
