= Fiebre (song) =

2018 single by Ricky Martin

Single by Ricky Martin featuring Wisin & Yandel
- Language: Spanish
- English title: "Fever"
- Released: February 23, 2018
- Genre: Reggaeton; pop
- Length: 3:50; 3:14 (solo version)
- Label: Sony Latin
- Songwriters: Víctor Rafael Torres Betancourt; Marcos Ramírez Carrasquillo; José Angel Torres Castro; Eliot José Feliciano; Ricky Martin; Andrés Castro; Yotuel Romero; Llandel Veguilla Malavé; Beatriz Luengo; Juan Luis Morera Luna
- Producer: Los Legendarios

Ricky Martin singles chronology
"Vente Pa' Ca" (2016)	"Fiebre" (2018)	"No Se Me Quita" (2019)

Wisin & Yandel singles chronology
"Te Deseo" (2013)	"Fiebre" (2018)	"Reggaetón en lo Oscuro" (2018)

Music video
- "Fiebre" on YouTube

"Fiebre" (transl. "Fever") is a song recorded by Puerto Rican singer Ricky Martin, featuring a guest appearance from Puerto Rican duo Wisin & Yandel. It was written by Víctor Rafael Torres Betancourt, Marcos Ramírez Carrasquillo, José Angel Torres Castro, Eliot José Feliciano, Martin, Andrés Castro, Yotuel Romero, Yandel, Beatriz Luengo, and Wisin, while the production was handled by Los Legendarios. The song was released for digital download and streaming as a single by Sony Music Latin on February 23, 2018. A Spanish language reggaeton and pop song with reggae and dembow influences, it is about an addictive lover and the heat of his feelings.

"Fiebre" received widely positive reviews from music critics, who complimented its sensual lyrics and danceable production. The song was commercially successful in Latin America, reaching number one in Chile, Ecuador, Guatemala, Mexico, and Uruguay. It also reached the summit of the Billboard Latin Airplay and Latin Rhythm Airplay charts. The track has received several certifications, including platinum in Mexico. It was nominated for Pop/Rock Song of the Year and Pop/Rock Collaboration of the Year at the 31st Annual Lo Nuestro Awards. The accompanying music video was directed by Carlos Perez and filmed in Puerto Vallarta, Mexico. It received positive reviews from music critics and a number of awards and nominations. To promote the song, Martin and Wisin & Yandel performed it at the 2018 Billboard Latin Music Awards.

== Background and release ==
On January 24, 2018, Ricky Martin shared a photo of himself in Puerto Vallarta and announced that he was recording a song, which would be titled "Fiebre". Two days later, he shared a photo of himself and the Puerto Rican duo Wisin & Yandel on Instagram, confirming that he has collaborated with them on the song. On February 20, 2018, in an interview with Gulf News, Martin told the newspaper about the collaboration:

The song is a powerful collaboration with Wisin and Yandel. They are super talented guys that I admire. And with this fusion we will be able to reach a broader audience.

On February 21, 2018, Martin shared the artwork for the single on his social media, as well as a part of the song, announcing that it would be released on February 23, 2018. The single was released for digital download and streaming by Sony Music Latin on the specified date and includes a solo version, alongside the original. It marked the second collaboration between Martin and Wisin & Yandel, following Frío.

== Music and lyrics ==
"Fiebre"
A 15-second sample of the chorus, which features an "upbeat" melody.

Musically, "Fiebre" is a Spanish language reggaeton and pop song, written by Víctor Rafael Torres Betancourt, Marcos Ramírez Carrasquillo, José Angel Torres Castro, Eliot José Feliciano, Martin, Andrés Castro, Yotuel Romero, Yandel, Beatriz Luengo, and Wisin. Its production was handled by Los Legendarios, and the song features Caribbean rhythms and elements of reggae and dembow. The track runs for a total of 3 minutes and 50 seconds.

Lyrically, "Fiebre" which translates to "Fever" in English, is described as "seductive", "sensual", and "romantic". Noelia Bertol from Cadena Dial said that like it is suggested by the song's title, it "transmits high temperatures". Throughout the song, Martin sings about an addictive lover and the heat of his feelings, with lyrics, including: "Fiebre, pierdo el sentido / Me va bajando despacito por el cuello hasta el ombligo / Y sabes, no tiene cura" ("Fever, I lose my sense / It's going down slowly for me / From the neck to the navel / And you know, there's no cure") and "Yo me la paso cada día / Pensando en ti y en tus ojos negros / Y en tu risa bella" ("I spend every day thinking of you / And your black eyes / And your beautiful laughter").

== Critical reception ==
Upon release, "Fiebre" was met with widely positive reviews from music critics. Los 40 staff stated that the song "catches from the first moment you hear it". They praised "the magic" behind Martin's voice, which is "accompanied by an infectious Caribbean rhythm, sensual lyrics and the urban touch" of the duo, describing the trio as "the perfect combination" that turn the track into "one of the great songs of 2018". Also from Los 40, Juan Vicente gave the song a positive review, saying it has "already presented its candidacy for song of the summer". Noelia Bertol from Cadena Dial ranked it as one of "Ricky Martin six collaborations that have us moving the skeleton" and said that since we can "not stop listening to it over and over again", it would cause "fever". In another article, she listed the track among his ten "songs that brighten up summers", stating that "he is so good at raising the temperature of the place".

An author of BFM TV described "Fiebre" as "catchy" and "sultry", and Monitor Latino's Nayeli Rivera described it as a "musical bombshell". Idolator's Mike Nied said that the song "sounds like a sexy smash", labeling it "a certifiably sexy bop". He continued to admire the solo version for its "danceable production" and "beguiling vocal performance", emphasizing that "it has all the makings of a major hit". About the collaboration with Wisin & Yandel, he said that their additional verses "add a little extra flair to heat things up even further". Writing for 20 minutos, David Moreno Sáenz stated: "The chemistry between Wisin & Yandel and Ricky is fantastic, and it shows in the song and the video." A writer of La Opinión complimented the track, saying: "The sounds are well harmonized and allows the listener to grow in the dance, just like the song."

=== Accolades ===
In 2021, Cadena Dial ranked "Fiebre" as one of the 10 songs to dance with at the Bonfires of Saint John. The track was nominated for Pop/Rock Song of the Year and Pop/Rock Collaboration of the Year at the 2019 Lo Nuestro Awards, but lost to "Me niego" by Reik featuring Ozuna and Wisin in both categories. It was also nominated for Urban Pop Song at the 2019 Premios Tu Música Urbano, and was acknowledged as an award-winning song at the 2019 ASCAP Latin Awards.

== Commercial performance ==
"Fiebre" debuted at number 27 on the US Hot Latin Songs chart on March 10, 2018, with a first-week tally of 4,000 downloads sold, 911,000 streams, and 6 million radio impressions. Thus, it became Martin's 47th entry on the chart and Wisin & Yandel's 37th. On May 19, 2018, the song reached its peak of number 17, becoming Martin's 36th top 20 release on the chart and Wisin & Yandel's 27th. It also peaked at number three on both the US Latin Digital Song Sales and Latin Pop Airplay charts, and number one on both the Latin Rhythm Airplay and Latin Airplay charts. On the last chart, it became Martin's 17th crowning hit and Wisin & Yandel's 11th, making Martin continue to hold the second-most number ones on the list, trailing only Enrique Iglesias.

"Fiebre" also extended Martin's record as the artist with most top 20s on the US Latin Pop Airplay chart, with 45 songs. The song was certified Latin platinum by the Recording Industry Association of America (RIAA), for track-equivalent sales of over 60,000 units in the United States. As of June 2018, the song has sold over 65,000 copies in the country. Additionally, Martin's February 23 Facebook Live video in which he performed the track live in Dubai, reached the summit of Billboard's Top Facebook Live Videos chart for February 2018. According to Shareablee, it led all Facebook Live videos from musicians in reactions (142,000) and first-seven-days views (12.3 million).

Besides the United States, "Fiebre" reached number one in Chile, Ecuador, Guatemala, Mexico, and Uruguay. In Mexico, the song was certified platinum by the Asociación Mexicana de Productores de Fonogramas y Videogramas (AMPROFON), for track-equivalent sales of over 60,000 units. It also peaked in the top 10 of Argentina, Costa Rica, Hungary, Latin America, Panama, and Paraguay, as well as the top 15 of Bolivia and El Salvador. In Spain, the song peaked at number 24 and was certified gold by the Productores de Música de España (Promusicae), for track-equivalent sales of over 20,000 units.

== Music video ==
=== Development and synopsis ===
A screenshot from the orange tinted music video, depicting Martin soaking in a bathtub.

On January 24, 2018, Martin shared a photo of himself on the set of filming "Fiebre" music video, and two days later, he shared another photo from behind the scenes of the visual, this time along with Wisin & Yandel. He was seen wearing a pair of leather trousers in the latter. Martin premiered the video via a live broadcast on Facebook and uploaded it to his YouTube channel in a few hours after the song's release on February 23, 2018. The video was filmed in Puerto Vallarta, Mexico, and directed by Carlos Perez, who had previously directed the videos for Martin's singles "Tal Vez", "Jaleo", "The Best Thing About Me Is You", "Frío", "Come with Me", and "Perdóname".

The orange tinted video features a fusion of pre-Hispanic rhythms and dance in the intro, and refers to Aztec culture and landscapes of the city of Puerto Vallarta. It begins with scenes of a touristic beach center, a native warrior dancing in a "candle-lit" church, and the singer soaking in a tub. The video shows Martin in a torn waistcoat being encompassed passionately, and in other sections, he appears immersed in a sea of candles and hot choreography. In the next scenes, an abandoned rustic residence appears with fire performers and female belly dancers there. The visual also depicts Wisin & Yandel in suggestive leather police uniforms-like outfits and caps, consonant with sunglasses. Additionally, the music video features a seductive show of dancers raunchily twist behind each other and slowly move across a slightly warm glow-lit dark room. It includes two gay men dance sensually together, representing their attractive muscles and hold each other while Martin notices them passionately.

=== Reception ===
The music video was met with positive reviews from music critics. Diana Marti from E! Online said that the video is "just as steamy as the song", since Martin "never disappoints", and Lena Hansen from People described it as "temperature-raising" and "hot". Adam Bloodworth from PinkNews celebrated Martin's "first foray into music that shows off his sexuality". Miami Herald's Madeleine Marr stated that the video is "— in a word — hot". It was nominated for Best Pop Video at the 2018 Premios Quiero. At the 2019 Latin VideoClip Awards, it was nominated for Best Direction and Best Edition, and won the award for Best Tropical Video – Fusion. As of November 2019, the video has received over 100 million views on YouTube.

== Live performances ==
Martin gave his first live performance of "Fiebre" at the 2018 Dubai International Jazz Festival on February 23. He performed it along with Wisin & Yandel for the first time together at the 25th Annual Billboard Latin Music Awards on April 26, 2018. The rendition began with Martin appearing solo on stage surrounded by dancers holding torches until Wisin & Yandel presented themselves. The song was included on Martin's the Ricky Martin en Concierto tour. On December 1, 2018, Wisin & Yandel invited Martin as a guest to their Como Antes Tour and the trio performed "Fiebre" and "Adrenalina" together at the José Miguel Agrelot Coliseum in San Juan, Puerto Rico. During the performance, Martin wore a black T-shirt with the flag of Puerto Rico drawn by his children, to raise funds for helping people and reconstructing houses, following Hurricane Maria. Also, the songwriters Yotuel Romero and Andrés Castro performed the track at the 27th Annual ASCAP Latin Awards on March 5, 2019.

== Track listing ==
Digital download / streaming
No.	Title	Length
1.	"Fiebre (feat. Wisin & Yandel)"	3:50
2.	"Fiebre"	3:14

== Credits and personnel ==
Credits adapted from Tidal.

- Ricky Martin – vocal, composer, lyricist, associated performer
- Wisin – composer, lyricist, associated performer, featured artist
- Yandel – composer, lyricist, associated performer, featured artist
- Víctor Rafael Torres Betancourt – composer, lyricist
- Marcos Ramírez Carrasquillo – composer, lyricist
- José Angel Torres Castro – composer, lyricist
- Eliot José Feliciano – composer, lyricist
- Andrés Castro – composer, lyricist, co-producer, guitar, keyboards, programmer, recording engineer
- Yotuel Romero – composer, lyricist
- Beatriz Luengo – composer, lyricist
- Los Legendarios – producer
- Derrick Stockwell – assistant engineer
- Daniel Buitrago – keyboards, programmer
- Édgar Barrera – keyboards, programmer
- Mike Fuller – mastering engineer
- Luis Barrera – mixing engineer, recording engineer
- Roberto "Tito" Vázquez – mixing engineer
- Richard Bravo – percussion
- Shafik Palis – recording engineer

== Charts ==
=== Weekly charts ===
Weekly peak performance for "Fiebre"
Chart (2018)	Peak position
Argentina Hot 100 (Billboard)	84
Argentina (Monitor Latino)	2
Bolivia (Monitor Latino)	11
Chile (Monitor Latino)	1
Colombia (National-Report)	62
Costa Rica (Monitor Latino)	2
Dominican Republic Pop (Monitor Latino)	3
Ecuador (Monitor Latino)	1
Ecuador (National-Report)	1
El Salvador (Monitor Latino)	15
Guatemala (Monitor Latino)	1
Honduras Pop (Monitor Latino)	5
Hungary (Single Top 40)	9
Latin America (Monitor Latino)	7
Mexico (Billboard Mexican Airplay)	6
Mexico (Monitor Latino)	1
Nicaragua Pop (Monitor Latino)	5
Panama (Monitor Latino)	10
Paraguay (Monitor Latino)	8
Spain (Promusicae)	24
Switzerland (Schweizer Hitparade)	69
Uruguay (Monitor Latino)	1
US Hot Latin Songs (Billboard)	17
US Latin Airplay (Billboard)	1
US Latin Pop Airplay (Billboard)	3
US Latin Rhythm Airplay (Billboard)	1
US Radio Songs (Billboard)	47
Venezuela (National-Report)	24

=== Year-end charts ===
2018 year-end chart performance for "Fiebre"
Chart (2018)	Position
Argentina (Monitor Latino)	8
Bolivia (Monitor Latino)	32
Chile (Monitor Latino)	36
Costa Rica (Monitor Latino)	20
Dominican Republic Pop (Monitor Latino)	12
Ecuador (Monitor Latino)	18
El Salvador (Monitor Latino)	75
Guatemala (Monitor Latino)	32
Honduras (Monitor Latino)	77
Latin America (Monitor Latino)	38
Mexico (Monitor Latino)	42
Nicaragua (Monitor Latino)	69
Panama (Monitor Latino)	53
Paraguay (Monitor Latino)	61
Peru (Monitor Latino)	93
Uruguay (Monitor Latino)	6
US Hot Latin Songs (Billboard)	57
US Latin Airplay (Billboard)	16
US Latin Pop Airplay (Billboard)	12
US Latin Rhythm Airplay (Billboard)	14

2019 year-end chart performance for "Fiebre"
Chart (2019)	Position
Argentina Latin (Monitor Latino)	93
Chile Pop (Monitor Latino)	86
Honduras Pop (Monitor Latino)	73
Paraguay Pop (Monitor Latino)	72

== Certifications ==
Certifications and sales for "Fiebre"
Region	Certification	Certified units/sales
Mexico (AMPROFON)	Platinum	60,000^{‡}
Spain (Promusicae)	Gold	20,000^{‡}
United States (RIAA)	Platinum (Latin)	65,000
^{‡} Sales+streaming figures based on certification alone.

== Release history ==
Release dates and formats for "Fiebre"
Region	Date	Format(s)	Label	Ref.
Various	February 23, 2018	Digital download; streaming	Sony Music Latin	
Latin America	February 23, 2018	Contemporary hit radio	Sony Music Latin	
Italy	April 13, 2018	Contemporary hit radio	Sony Music Latin	
Russia	May 4, 2018	Contemporary hit radio	Sony Music Latin	

== See also ==
- List of Billboard Hot Latin Songs and Latin Airplay number ones of 2018
