= Cadena Dial =

Spanish radio station

Spain
- Broadcast area: Spain
- Frequency: 88.1–106.8 MHz (Varies depending on the region)

Programming
- Format: Spanish AC

Ownership
- Owner: PRISA Radio (PRISA)
- Sister stations: Cadena SER; LOS40; LOS40 Classic; LOS40 Dance; LOS40 Urban; Radiolé

History
- First air date: 3 September 1990

Links
- Website: www.cadenadial.com

Cadena Dial is a Spanish radio station. The station belongs to the Spanish media group PRISA. It was founded in 1990 and broadcasts exclusively pop music in Spanish (and Catalan, in the case of Catalonia). On 7 April 2017 Cadena Dial began broadcasting on DTT, along with LOS40 and Cadena SER. All of its programming is produced in Madrid, although it could be received throughout Spain. Its format is aimed at a family audience for both young people and adults. It is the second highest rated music station in the country with 2,109,000 listeners, according to the third wave of the EGM in 2019, just behind LOS40. It can be listened to through FM radio, DTT, Internet and its application for mobile devices.

Uniquely to Spanish music radio, it is one of the two stations that does not broadcast automated music feed at any moment; the other being Kiss FM.

== Programming ==
- Atrévete: The breakfast programme, presented mainly by Manel Fuentes since 28 August 2017, being the 6th main presenter. Its co-presenters are Patricia Imaz and the comedian Isidro Montalvo, who is in charge of making prank calls. The rest of the team is composed of Sebastián Maspons "Maspi", Saray Esteso, Iván Arévalo and David del Río. It is the third most listened to Spanish breakfast music programme with 1,269,000 listeners a day, behind Cadena 100's Buenos días, Javi y Mar and LOS40's Anda Ya. The programme is not on air during Christmas and summer holidays, instead replaced by extended version of Fórmula Cadena Dial.
- Dial Tal Cual: A Saturday programme that airs from 10:00 to 14:00, presented by Rafa Cano, and co-presented by Álvaro Díaz and MJ Aledón, the two presenters of the now-default weeknight show Déjate Llevar. Dial Tal Cual contains the novelties of music in Spanish as well as in Déjate Llevar, the music news and the research of the artists' social networks. There's a different artist joining every show.
- Dial Latino: New Saturday night programme on Cadena Dial, broadcast from 9:00 p.m. to midnight, presented by MJ Aledón, and plays the biggest Latin hits.
- Fórmula Cadena Dial: The music-led programme that covers the entire rest of the schedule. The broadcasts are sometimes voice-tracked. There was a time it played "4 hits in-a-row" every half-hour, but it has been quickly abandoned to make room for a higher level of interaction between listeners and announcers. Eight announcers take turn in a rotating schedule: Carmen Ramírez, Vicente Zamora, Álvaro Díaz, MJ Aledón, Rafa Cano, Alberto Lezaun, Javi Ayuso and Marta Briz. Raquel Cantos and Pedro García del Val substitute them during the summer break.

== See also ==
- List of radio stations in Spain
