= 2020 in Latin music =

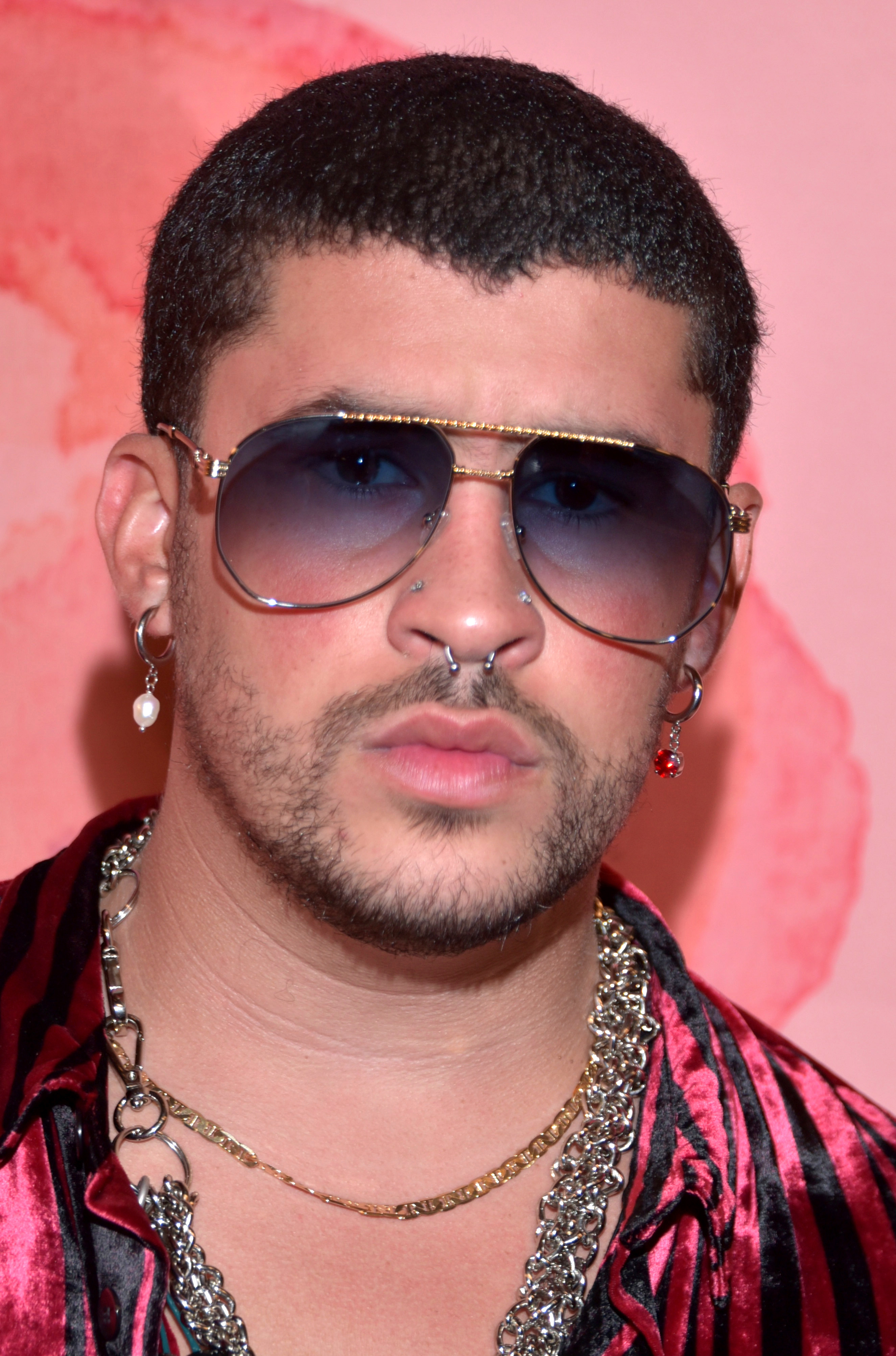
Puerto Rican rapper Bad Bunny was named Top Latin Artist of the Year in the United States by Billboard for the second time in a row.

The following is a list of events and new music that happened or are expected to happen in 2020 in the Latin music industry. Latin regions include Ibero-America, Spain, Portugal, and the United States.

== Events ==
=== January–March ===
- January 6 – "Despacito" by Luis Fonsi and Daddy Yankee becomes the highest-certified song of all-time in the United States after receiving a 13× platinum certification by the Recording Industry Association of America for units of over 13 million sales plus track-equivalent streams.
- January 20 – The 1st Annual Premios Odeón take place at the Teatro Real in Madrid.
  - #ElDisco by Alejandro Sanz wins Album of the Year.
  - Don Patricio and Cruz Cafuné win the Song of the Year award for the hit single "Contando Lunares".
  - Aitana wins the award for Best New Artist.
  - Colombian band Morat wins the award for Best Latin Artist.
  - The music video for "Con Altura", by Rosalía, J Balvin and El Guincho, wins the Video of the Year award.
- January 26 – The 62nd Grammy Awards are held at the Staples Center in Los Angeles, California.
  - Alejandro Sanz receives his fourth career Grammy Award by winning Best Latin Pop Album for El Disco.
  - Rosalía wins her first Grammy Award by winning Best Latin Rock, Urban or Alternative Album for El Mal Querer.
  - Mariachi Los Camperos receives their second career Grammy Award by winning Best Regional Mexican Music Album for De Ayer Para Siempre.
  - Marc Anthony's Opus and Aymée Nuviola's A Journey Through Cuban Music both win Best Tropical Latin Album. Anthony receives his third career Grammy Award, while Nuviola wins her first one.
  - Chick Corea's Antidote garners his 23rd career Grammy Award by winning Best Latin Jazz Album and extends his record for the artist with most wins in jazz categories.
- February 20 – The 32nd Annual Lo Nuestro Awards are held at the American Airlines Arena in Miami, Florida.
  - Daddy Yankee is the artist with most wins, with 7, including Artist of the Year and Single of the Year and Song of the Year for "Con Calma"; the latter two shared with Canadian rapper Snow.
  - Oasis by J Balvin and Bad Bunny wins Album of the Year.
  - Rosalía and Lunay win New Female Artist and New Male Artist, respectively.
- February 29 – "Tiburones" by Ricky Martin entered the US Hot Latin Songs chart, thus he became the first and only artist in history to enter the chart across five decades, including his work as part of Menudo.
- March 8 – Bad Bunny's second studio album YHLQMDLG (Yo Hago Lo Que Me Da La Gana) achieves the highest peak for a completely-Spanish-language album in the United States by debuting at number two, surpassing Shakira's Fijación Oral, Vol. 1 and Maná's Amar Es Combatir number four peaks. It also breaks the record for the largest streaming week for a Latin album, with 201.4 million streams, surpassing Ozuna's Aura. Additionally, all tracks from YHLQMDLG enter the US Hot Latin Songs chart in the album's debut week, with eight in the top 10 and 20 in the top 25. Bad Bunny also breaks the record for the most Spanish-language songs simultaneously charting on the Billboard Hot 100, with 11.
- March 17 – Due to concerns of the COVID-19 pandemic, the 2020 Billboard Latin Music Awards and Latinfest+, which was scheduled for April 20–23, have been postponed.

=== April–June ===
- April 2 – Following the complaints of reggaeton acts due to the Latin Record Academy not nominating reggaeton songs for its general fields' categories at the 20th Latin Grammy Awards, two new categories were created for the 2020 edition: Best Reggaeton Performance and Best Best Rap/Hip-Hop Song. A Best Pop/Rock Song category will also be introduced.
- May 16 – The 9th Premios Nuestra Tierra take place live from a studio in Bogotá to celebrate the best in Colombian music.
  - J Balvin wins Artist of the Year,
  - Fantasía by Sebastián Yatra wins Album of the Year.
  - "Tusa" by Karol G and Nicki Minaj wins Song of the Year.
  - Camilo wins Best New Artist.
- May 30 – Many artists reunite at 'Se Agradece' a virtual music festival organized by Mexican TV network TeleHit, to celebrate those who fight against COVID-19.

=== July–September ===
- July 7 – The 28th Annual ASCAP Latin Awards are held virtually from Colombia hosted by Greeicy and Mike Bahía.
  - "Con Calma" by Daddy Yankee wins Song of the Year.
  - Romeo Santos wins Songwriter/Artist of the Year.
  - Puerto Rican rapper Bad Bunny wins Songwriter of the Year.
- July 13 – Colombian reggaeton singer Karol G reveals that she has tested positive for COVID-19 a few weeks earlier.
- July 15 – The 5th Premios Pulsar take place live from a studio in Santiago to celebrate the best in Chilean music.
  - Cami wins Artist of the Year.
  - Naturaleza Muerta by Como Asesinar a Felipes wins Album of the Year.
  - "Aquí Estoy" by Cami wins Song of the Year.
  - Simón Campusano wins Best New Artist.
- August – Following his divorce, Venezuelan singer Nacho announces the birth of a child with his new partner.
- August 8 – "Carita de Inocente" by Prince Royce sets a new record on the Billboard Latin Tropical Airplay chart as longest-running number-one song with 20 weeks.
- August 13 - Colombian reggaeton singer J Balvin reveals at the Premios Juventud he has tested positive for COVID-19.
- August 15 – Billboard revamps the Latin Pop Airplay chart to reflect overall airplay of Latin pop music on Latin radio stations. Instead of ranking songs being played on Latin-pop stations, rankings are determined by the amount of airplay Latin-pop songs receive on stations that play Latin music regardless of genre. "Fútbol y Rumba" by Anuel AA featuring Enrique Iglesias becomes the first number-one song on the chart following the changes to it.
- August 30 – "Qué Pena" by Maluma and J Balvin wins Best Latin at the 2020 MTV Video Music Awards.
- September 14 – Billboard launches two new weekly charts, the Billboard Global 200 and Billboard Global Exclusive U.S.
  - The Billboard Global 200 is inclusive of worldwide songs while Billboard Global Excl. U.S. focuses on all territories outside the United States. Both collate sales and streaming data from more than 200 territories, with rankings based on a weighted formula incorporating official-only streams on both subscription and ad-supported tiers of leading digital platforms, and downloads from key online music retailers.
  - "Hawái" by Colombian singer Maluma becomes the first song to top the inaugural Billboard Global Excl. U.S. chart.
- September 15 – Billboard ranks the 50 best Latin songs of all time including releases by Selena, Marc Anthony, Juan Luis Guerra, Luis Fonsi, Shakira, Ricky Martin, and Rosalía among others. "A Dios le Pido" by Juanes was named the best one by the magazine.
- September 18 – The 22nd Premios Gardel take place live from a studio in Buenos Aires to celebrate the best in Argentinian music.
  - Lebón & Co. by David Lebón wins Album of the Year.
  - "Canguro" by Wos wins Song of the Year.
  - Lebón & Co. by David Lebón wins Record of the Year.
  - Wos win Best New Artist.
- September 22 – Rolling Stone update their list of "The 500 Greatest Albums of All Time" for the first time since 2012 including six Latin recordings.
  - El Mal Querer (2018) by Rosalía is named the Best Latin Album of all time, reaching the 315th spot on the list.
  - X 100pre (2018) by Bad Bunny places at 447.
  - Clandestino (1998) by Manu Chao places at 469.
  - Barrio Fino (2004) by Daddy Yankee places at 473.
  - Amor Prohibido (1994) by Selena places at 479.
  - Dónde Están los Ladrones? (1998) by Shakira places at 496.

=== October–December ===
- October 19 – Billboard launches the "Greatest of All-time Latin Artists chart. The list is based on the artist's performance on both the Billboard Hot Latin Songs and Top Latin Albums charts since both their inceptions in 1986 and 1993 respectively. Spanish singer Enrique Iglesias tops the chart and is followed by Luis Miguel, Selena, Marco Antonio Solís, and Vicente Fernández.
- October 21 – The 2020 Billboard Latin Music Awards are held at the BB&T Center in Sunrise, Florida.
  - Puerto Rican reggaeton rappers Daddy Yankee and Bad Bunny are the biggest winners with both artists receiving seven awards.
- October 22 – "Decepciones" by Alejandro Fernández and Calibre 50 becomes the latter's 17th number-one song on the Billboard Regional Mexican Airplay chart. With this achievement, they are the act with the most number-one songs on the chart, breaking a three-way tie with Conjunto Primavera and Intocable. It is also Fernández's third number-song on the chart.
- November 8 – The 27th MTV Europe Music Awards air on MTV.
  - Karol G wins Best Latin.
  - Pabllo Vittar wins Best Brazilian Act.
  - Danna Paola wins Best Latin America North Act.
  - Sebastián Yatra wins Best Latin America Central Act.
  - Lali wins Best Latin America South Act.
  - Fernando Daniel wins Best Portuguese Act.
  - La La Love You wins Best Spanish Act.
- November 19 – The 21st Annual Latin Grammy Awards take place at the American Airlines Arena in Miami.
  - Un Canto Por México, Vol. 1 by Natalia Lafourcade wins Album of the Year.
  - "Contigo" by Alejandro Sanz wins Record of the Year.
  - "René" by Residente wins Song of the Year.
  - Mike Bahía wins Best New Artist.
  - Rosalía (Best Urban Song; Best Urban Fusion/Performance; Best Short Form Music Video), Natalia Lafourcade (Album of the Year; Best Alternative Song; Best Regional Song) and Carlos Vives (Best Contemporany Tropical/Tropical Fusion Album; Best Tropical Song; Best Long Form Music Video) become the most awarded acts of the night. J Balvin, who was the most nominated artist of the night with 13 nominations, only took the award for Best Urban Album for Colores.
- November 27 – All tracks from Bad Bunny's third solo studio album El Último Tour del Mundo debut at the top 30 of the Spotify Global chart. "La Noche de Anoche", his collaboration with Rosalía, marks the record for the most streamed song sung in Spanish in 24 hours in history with 6.63 million streams in a single day.
- December 5 – The 15th LOS40 Music Awards take place in a television set in Madrid.
  - En Tus Planes by David Bisbal wins Best Spanish Album.
  - "Si Tú la Quieres" by David Bisbal and Aitana wins Best Spanish Song.
  - Maluma wins Best Latin Artist.
  - "Hawái" by Maluma wins Best Latin Song.
- December 12
  - El Último Tour del Mundo by Bad Bunny becomes the first album completely sung in Spanish to reach number-one on the Billboard 200.
  - Bad Bunny is also the first Latin artist to reach number-one on the Billboard Global 200 chart with his song "Dakiti" (a duet with Jhay Cortez).

== Number-one albums and singles by country ==
- List of Billboard Argentina Hot 100 number-one singles of 2020
- List of number-one albums of 2020 (Mexico)
- List of number-one songs of 2020 (Mexico)
- List of number-one albums of 2020 (Portugal)
- List of number-one albums of 2020 (Spain)
- List of number-one singles of 2020 (Spain)
- List of number-one Billboard Latin Albums from the 2010s
- List of Billboard number-one Latin songs of 2020
- List of number-one Billboard Regional Mexican Songs of 2020
- List of number-one songs of 2020 (Puerto Rico)

== Awards ==
=== Latin music awards ===
- 32nd Lo Nuestro Awards
- 2020 Billboard Latin Music Awards
- 2020 Latin Grammy Awards
- 2020 Heat Latin Music Awards
- 2020 MTV Millennial Awards

=== Awards with Latin categories ===
- 27th Billboard Music Awards
- 62nd Grammy Awards
- 7th iHeartRadio Music Awards
- 15th Los40 Music Awards
- 37th MTV Video Music Awards
- 22nd Teen Choice Awards
- 1st Premios Odeón

== Spanish-language songs on the Billboard Hot 100 ==
The Billboard Hot 100 ranks the most-played songs in the United States based on sales (physical and digital), radio play, and online streaming. Also included are certifications awarded by the Recording Industry Association of America (RIAA), both standard and Latin. In 2020, a total of 19 Spanish-language songs have debuted in the Billboard Hot 100. From the Latin songs released in 2020, "Dakiti" by Bad Bunny and Jhay Cortez has been the highest-peaking of the year, having reached number 5.

Song	Performer(s)	Entry	Peak	Weeks	RIAA certification	Ref.
2017 entries
"Feliz Navidad"	José Feliciano	January 7, 2017	6	37		
2019 entries
"China"	Anuel AA, Daddy Yankee, Karol G, Ozuna and J Balvin	August 3, 2019	43	18	Gold (Latin)	
"Loco Contigo"	DJ Snake, J Balvin and Tyga	October 5, 2019	95	2	Platinum	
"Tusa"	Karol G and Nicki Minaj	November 23, 2019	42	21	41× Platinum (Latin)	
"Ritmo (Bad Boys for Life)"	Black Eyed Peas and J Balvin	November 30, 2019	26	27	2× Platinum	
"Vete"	Bad Bunny	December 7, 2019	33	18	27× Platinum (Latin)	
2020 entries
"KEII"	Anuel AA	February 22, 2020	83	1		
"Ignorantes"	Bad Bunny featuring Sech	February 29, 2020	49	3	15× Platinum (Latin)	
"Si Veo a Tu Mamá"	Bad Bunny	March 14, 2020	32	5	17× Platinum (Latin)	
"La Difícil"	Bad Bunny	March 14, 2020	33	5	15× Platinum (Latin)	
"Yo Perreo Sola"	Bad Bunny	March 14, 2020	53	17	24× Platinum (Latin)	
"La Santa"	Bad Bunny and Daddy Yankee	March 14, 2020	53	2	12× Platinum (Latin)	
"Pero Ya No"	Bad Bunny	March 14, 2020	63	1		
"Safaera"	Bad Bunny, Jowell & Randy and Ñengo Flow	March 14, 2020	81	7	21× Platinum (Latin)	
"Bichiyal"	Bad Bunny and Yaviah	March 14, 2020	89	1		
"Solía"	Bad Bunny	March 14, 2020	94	1		
"Está Cabrón Ser Yo"	Bad Bunny and Anuel AA	March 14, 2020	97	1		
"Sigues Con Él"	Arcángel and Sech	April 25, 2020	78	3		
"TKN"	Rosalía and Travis Scott	June 13, 2020	66	1	Gold	
"Hasta Que Dios Diga"	Anuel AA and Bad Bunny	June 13, 2020	86	1		
"Mamacita"	Black Eyed Peas, Ozuna and J. Rey Soul	June 20, 2020	62	11	Gold	
"Yaya"	6ix9ine	July 18, 2020	99	1		
"Un Día (One Day)"	J Balvin, Dua Lipa, Bad Bunny and Tainy	August 8, 2020	63	14	15× Platinum (Latin)	
"La Jeepeta"	Nio García, Anuel AA, Myke Towers, Brray and Juanka	August 22, 2020	93	10	16× Platinum (Latin)	
"Caramelo"	Ozuna, Karol G and Myke Towers	August 29, 2020	76	10		
"Hawái"	Maluma (solo or featuring The Weeknd)	September 5, 2020	12	21	62× Platinum (combined) (Latin)	
"Relación"	Sech, Daddy Yankee and J Balvin feat. Rosalía and Farruko	September 19, 2020	64	11	Diamond (Latin)	
"Me Gusta"	Anitta featuring Cardi B and Myke Towers	October 3, 2020	91	1		
"Ay, Dios Mío!"	Karol G	October 10, 2020	94	1	15× Platinum (Latin)	
"La Tóxica"	Farruko	November 7, 2020	95	4	8× Platinum (Latin)	
"Dakiti"	Bad Bunny and Jhay Cortez	November 14, 2020	5	29	24× Platinum (Latin)	
"Bichota"	Karol G	December 5, 2020	72	13	20× Platinum (Latin)	
"La Noche de Anoche"	Bad Bunny and Rosalía	December 12, 2020	53	17		
"Te Mudaste"	Bad Bunny	December 12, 2020	60	2		
"Yo Visto Así"	Bad Bunny	December 12, 2020	64	1		
"Haciendo Que Me Amas"	Bad Bunny	December 12, 2020	72	1		
"Te Deseo Lo Mejor"	Bad Bunny	December 12, 2020	74	1		
"Booker T"	Bad Bunny	December 12, 2020	78	1		
"El Mundo Es Mío"	Bad Bunny	December 12, 2020	79	1		
"Hoy Cobré"	Bad Bunny	December 12, 2020	81	1		
"Maldita Pobreza"	Bad Bunny	December 12, 2020	87	1		
"La Droga"	Bad Bunny	December 12, 2020	94	1		

== Spanish and Portuguese-language songs on the Billboard Global 200 ==
On September 19, 2020, Billboard established the Global 200 chart, which ranks the top songs globally based on digital sales and online streaming from over 200 territories worldwide. The list displays every song in Spanish and Portuguese that has ranked on this chart in 2020 since its inception. "Dakiti by Bad Bunny and Jhay Cortez became the first Latin song to top the chart. Four other Latin songs reached the top-ten in 2020.

Song	Performer(s)	Entry	Peak	Weeks	Ref.
"Hawái"	Maluma (solo or featuring The Weeknd)	September 19, 2020	3	60	
"Relación"	Sech, Daddy Yankee and J Balvin featuring Rosalía and Farruko	September 19, 2020	13	31	
"Caramelo"	Ozuna, Karol G and Myke Towers	September 19, 2020	16	26	
"Ay, Dios Mío!"	Karol G	September 19, 2020	25	20	
"Tattoo"	Rauw Alejandro and Camilo	September 19, 2020	28	22	
"La Jeepeta"	Nio García, Anuel AA, Myke Towers, Brray, and Juanka	September 19, 2020	29	19	
"Un Día (One Day)"	J Balvin, Dua Lipa, Bad Bunny, and Tainy	September 19, 2020	30	30	
"La Curiosidad"	DJ Nelson featuring Jay Wheeler & Myke Towers	September 19, 2020	40	51	
"Agua"	Tainy and J Balvin	September 19, 2020	46	11	
"Mamacita"	Black Eyed Peas, Ozuna and J. Rey Soul	September 19, 2020	65	7	
"Porfa"	Feid, J Balvin, Maluma, Nicky Jam, Sech and Justin Quiles	September 19, 2020	79	8	
"Mi Cuarto"	Jerry Di	September 19, 2020	81	12	
"Elegí"	Lenny Tavárez, Rauw Alejandro, Dalex, and Dímelo Flow	September 19, 2020	98	5	
"Mamichula"	Trueno, Nicki Nicole, featuring Taiu, Bizarrap and Tattool	September 19, 2020	100	7	
"Del Mar"	Ozuna, Doja Cat, and Sia	September 19, 2020	101	2	
"Tusa"	Karol G, and Nicki Minaj	September 19, 2020	109	18	
"Ayer Me Llamó Mi Ex"	Khea, Lenny Santos, Natti Natasha, and Prince Royce	September 19, 2020	77	7	
"TKN"	Rosalía and Travis Scott	September 19, 2020	126	3	
"Despacito"	Luis Fonsi and Daddy Yankee featuring Justin Bieber	September 19, 2020	114	91	
"Yo Perreo Sola"	Bad Bunny	September 19, 2020	74	13	
"Dream Girl"	Ir-Sais and Rauw Alejandro	September 19, 2020	157	2	
"Sigues Con Él"	Arcángel and Sech	September 19, 2020	159	7	
"ADMV"	Maluma	September 19, 2020	165	1	
"Azul"	J Balvin	September 19, 2020	166	4	
"Despeinada"	Ozuna and Camilo	September 19, 2020	54	16	
"Parce"	Maluma featuring Lenny Tavárez and Justin Quiles	September 19, 2020	49	21	
"Ritmo (Bad Boys for Life)"	Black Eyed Peas and J Balvin	September 19, 2020	173	2	
"Favorito"	Camilo	September 19, 2020	200	1	
"Una Locura"	Ozuna, J Balvin, and Chencho Corleone	September 26, 2020	74	20	
"Don Don"	Daddy Yankee, Anuel AA, and Kendo Kaponi	September 26, 2020	101	3	
"La Tóxica"	Farruko	September 26, 2020	24	25	
"Me Gusta"	Anitta featuring Cardi B and Myke Towers	October 3, 2020	37	6	
"Se Te Nota"	Lele Pons and Guaynaa	October 3, 2020	44	18	
"Safaera"	Bad Bunny, Jowell & Randy and Ñengo Flow	October 3, 2020	80	4	
"Jeans"	Justin Quiles	October 3, 2020	78	13	
"+Linda"	Dalex, Arcángel, Manuel Turizo, De la Ghetto and Beéle	October 3, 2020	193	1	
"Vida de Rico"	Camilo	October 10, 2020	29	24	
"Pa' Ti"	Jennifer Lopez and Maluma	October 10, 2020	106	1	
"La Nota"	Manuel Turizo, Myke Towers, and Rauw Alejandro	October 24, 2020	59	24	
"Mi Niña"	Los Legendarios, Wisin and Myke Towers	October 24, 2020	82	20	
"Bichota"	Karol G	November 7, 2020	7	30	
"Recairei"	Os Barões da Pisadinha	November 7, 2020	178	2	
"Madrid"	Maluma and Myke Towers	November 7, 2020	193	1	
"Chica Ideal"	Guaynaa and Sebastián Yatra	November 7, 2020	74	18	
"Dakiti"	Bad Bunny and Jhay Cortez	November 14, 2020	1	111	
"Reloj"	Rauw Alejandro and Anuel AA	November 14, 2020	41	33	
"Diosa"	Myke Towers, Natti Natasha, and Anuel AA	November 14, 2020	135	2	
"Tú Me Dejaste de Querer"	C. Tangana featuring Niño de Elche and La Húngara	November 21, 2020	83	3	
"La Luz"	Sech and J Balvin	November 21, 2020	180	1	
"Dime Cómo Quieres"	Christian Nodal and Ángela Aguilar	November 28, 2020	89	3	
"De Cora <3"	Rauw Alejandro and J Balvin	November 28, 2020	145	1	
"Ilusão (Cracolândia)"	MC Hariel, Alok, and MC Ryan SP featuring MC Davi and Salvador da Rima	November 28, 2020	178	1	
"Feliz Navidad"	José Feliciano	November 28, 2020	5	38	
"Polvo"	Nicky Jam and Myke Towers	December 5, 2020	173	5	
"La Noche de Anoche"	Bad Bunny and Rosalía	December 12, 2020	7	37	
"Te Mudaste"	Bad Bunny	December 12, 2020	19	17	
"Yo Visto Así"	Bad Bunny	December 12, 2020	25	2	
"Haciendo Que Me Amas"	Bad Bunny	December 12, 2020	29	3	
"Te Deseo lo Mejor"	Bad Bunny	December 12, 2020	39	2	
"Booker T"	Bad Bunny	December 12, 2020	45	8	
"El Mundo es Mío"	Bad Bunny	December 12, 2020	53	1	
"Hoy Cobré"	Bad Bunny	December 12, 2020	54	1	
"Maldita Pobreza"	Bad Bunny	December 12, 2020	59	1	
"La Droga"	Bad Bunny	December 12, 2020	60	1	
"Antes Que Se Acabe"	Bad Bunny	December 12, 2020	71	1	
"Sorry Papi"	Bad Bunny	December 12, 2020	72	1	
"120"	Bad Bunny	December 12, 2020	76	1	
"Trellas"	Bad Bunny	December 12, 2020	83	1	
"Amor ou o Litrão (Brega Funk)"	Mila, Menor Nico, and Petter Ferraz	December 19, 2020	125	2	
"Bebé"	Camilo and El Alfa	December 19, 2020	59	14	
"Hecha Pa' Mí"	Boza	December 26, 2020	43	22	

== Albums released ==
The following is a list of notable Latin albums (music performed in Spanish or Portuguese) (Note: In the United States, Billboard and the RIAA recognizes an album as "Latin" if 51% or more of its content is sung in the Spanish language. The Latin Recording Academy extends this definition of "Latin music" to include Portuguese-language records as well as other languages and dialects of Ibero-America such as Catalan, Nahuatl, Quechua, Galician, Valencia, and Mayan. The Latin Recording Academy also includes Latin instrumental recordings performed by Ibero-American musicians. Note that Spain and Portugal are included under this definition of Ibero-America.) that have been released in Latin America, Spain, Portugal, or the United States in 2020.

=== First-quarter ===
==== January ====
Day	Title	Artist	Genre(s)	Singles	Label
3	En Tus Planes	David Bisbal	Latin pop		Universal Spain
10	Moonlight922	Cruz Cafuné	Trap pop		MÉCÉN Ent.
10	Ventura	Suu	Pop		Halley Records
10	Disco Estimulante	Hello Seahorse!	Latin alternative		ONErpm
10	Fazendo Samba	Moacyr Luz and Samba do Trabalhador	Samba		Biscoito Fino
16	Caetano Veloso & Ivan Sacerdote	Caetano Veloso and Ivan Sacerdote	MPB		Uns Produções, Universal Music International
16	Sonidos Que Cuentan	Veleta Roja	Children's		Veleta Roja Editions
17	Élite	La Zowi	Experimental trap		La Vendicion
17	Lina_Raül Refree	Lina, Raül Refree	Fado		Glitterbeat
24	Easy Money Baby	Myke Towers	Reggaeton		White World
24	Famouz Reloaded	Jhay Cortez	Reggaeton		Universal Latino
24	Origen	Fuel Fandango	Electro funk		Warner Music
24	#Isso é Churrasco (Ao Vivo) [Deluxe]	Fernando & Sorocaba	Música sertaneja		Sony Music Brasil
30	Tardo Antiguo	Antonio Campos	Flamenco		La Voz del Flamenco
31	Cortocircuitos	Mr. Kilombo	Pop		Kilombo Records
31	Sanación	María José Llergo	New flamenco		Sony Music Spain
31	Sauce Boyz	Eladio Carrion	Latin trap		Rimas
31	Un Planeta Llamado Nosotros	Maldita Nerea	Pop rock		Sony Music Spain

==== February ====
Day	Title	Artist	Genre(s)	Singles	Label
7	Alter Ego	Prince Royce	Bachata	"El Clavo" "El Clavo" (remix) "Adicto" "Cúrame" "Morir Solo" "Trampa" "Dec. 21" "Cita" "Carita de Inocente" "Luna Negra"	Sony Music Latin
7	Donde Nace el Infarto	Ciudad Jara	Rock		El Último Pasillo
7	Perreamos?	Young Cister	Reggaeton		Sony Music Chile
7	SIE7E +	Danna Paola	Latin pop	"Sodio"	Universal Mexico
7	A La Medianoche	Elevation Worship	Latin Christian		Elevation Worship
7	Creme De La Creme	Jory Boy	Reggaeton		Young Boss Entertainment
12	Martinho 8.0 - Bandeira da Fé: Um Concerto Pop-Clássico (Ao Vivo)	Martinho da Vila	Samba		Sony Music Brasil
14	Corazon Tumbado	Natanael Cano	Corridos trap		Rancho Humilde
14	Hecho en México	Alejandro Fernández	Ranchera	"Caballero"	Universal Latino
14	Marjorie	Núria Graham	Indie pop	"Connemara"	Primavera Labels
14	Recuerdos un poco antes y un poco despues de conocer a 1 xico (el mio)	Rebe	Indie		Jeanne d'Arc Records
14	Tu Veneno Mortal	Eslabon Armado	Regional Mexican		DEL
14	Mi Derriengue	Riccie Oriach	Tropical fusion		Círculo Cuadrado
20	Ilus3	Ezequiel Benitez	Flamenco		Lb Flamenco, Belayo Producciones
21	Ataque Celeste	El Columpio Asesino	Synth-pop		Oso Polita Records
21	Bailando en la Batalla	Nil Moliner	Catalan rumba	"El Despertar" "Soldadito de Hierro" "Déjame Escapar" "Cien Por Cien" "Bailando"	Warner Music Spain
21	Más Caro, Que Ayer	Gerardo Ortíz	Banda		Sony Music Latin
21	O Método	Rodrigo Leão	New-age		Warner Music Portugal
21	Acabadabra	Juan Galeano	Pop rock		Warner Music Portugal
21	De Terán Para El Mundo	Buyuchek and La Abuela Irma Silva	Norteño		Fonovisa
28	La Gran Onada	Sopa de Cabra	Indie pop		Promo Arts Music
28	Remendar el Caos	KeTeKalles	Various		Independent
28	Viene de Largo	Najwa	Experimental		Warner Music Spain
29	Puro Ocio	Verto	Rap		Independent
29	YHLQMDLG	Bad Bunny	Reggaeton · Latin trap	"Vete" "Ignorantes" "La Difícil" "Yo Perreo Sola"	Rimas Entertainment

==== March ====
Day	Title	Artist	Genre(s)	Singles	Label
6	Bestieza	Los Enemigos	Rock		Alkilo Discos
6	És Per Tu I Per Mi	Marialluïsa	Indie		Primavera Labels
6	Perreo Hasta la Muerte 2.5	Yung Beef	Trap		La Vendición Records
6	Valhalla (Vol.1)	31FAM	Trap		Delirics
6	Caminemos con Jesús	Tony Alonso	Latin Christian		Gia Publications
11	The Juliet Letters	Cuarteto Latinoamericano and Elena Rivera	Classical		Cuarteto Latinoamericano
13	EP2	Natalia Lacunza	Glitch pop	"Olvídate de Mí" "Algo Duele Más" "A Otro Lado"	Universal Music Spain
13	Gominola	Chico Blanco	Rap		Independent
13	Mais Antigo	Bispo	Rap		Sony Music Portugal
13	Sorry For the Wait	Herencia de Patrones	Regional Mexican		Rancho Humilde
13	The Kids That Grew Up On Reggaeton	Tainy	Reggaeton		NEON16
13	La Conquista del Espacio	Fito Páez	Rock en español		Sony Music Argentina
13	Letrux Aos Prantos	Letícia Novaes	Brazilian rock		Altafonte
13	Churrasco do Teló, Vol. 2 (Ao Vivo)	Michel Teló	Música sertaneja		Som Livre
18	Vivir	Naike Ponce	Flamenco		RockCD
20	Colores	J Balvin	Reggaeton	"Morado" "Blanco" "Rojo" "Amarillo"	Universal Latin
20	Impulso	Dvicio	Pop		Sony Music
20	Modo Avión	Dalex	Urbano		Rich Music
20	Triángulo De Amor Bizarro	Triángulo De Amor Bizarro	Indie rock		Mushroom Pillow
20	Ventanas	Niños Mutantes	Indie pop		Ernie Records
20	Ubicación en Tiempo Real	Barbi Recanati	Latin alternative		Goza
20	A los 4 Vientos, Vol. 1 (Ranchero)	Eugenia León	Ranchera		Eugenia León
20	Bailando Sones y Huapangos con el Mariachi Sol de México de José Hernández	Mariachi Sol de Mexico de José Hernández	Mariachi		Serenata
20	Soldados	Alex Campos	Latin Christian		Alex Campos
24	111	Pabllo Vittar	Dance pop	"Clima Quente" "Timida" "Rajadao"	Sony Music
24	José Antônio Rezende de Almeida Prado: Piano Concerto No. 1 - Aurora - Concerto Fribourgeois	Minas Gerais Philharmonic Orchestra and Sonia Rubinsk	Classical		Naxos
26	Por Mais Beijos ao Vivo	Zé Neto & Cristiano	Música sertaneja		Som Livre
27	Atrapado en un Sueño	Junior H	Regional Mexican		Rancho Humilde
27	A los 4 Vientos, Vol. 2 (Norteño)	Eugenia León	Norteño		Eugenia León
27	Tango Argentino: Gardel y Piazzolla	Jorge Calandrelli	Tango		Forever Music, Cda Music Group
27	¿Quién Dijo Miedo?	Gilberto Daza	Latin Christian		Creation Music Group
27	Targino Sem Limites	Targino Gondim	Brazilian roots		ONErpm
30	Que suene el cante	Antonio Reyes	Flamenco		Lb Flamenco, Pelayo Producciones

=== Second quarter ===
==== April ====
Day	Title	Artist	Genre(s)	Singles	Label
1	Tempo de Viver	Thiago Holanda	MPB		DMusic
3	La Dirección de Tu Suerte	Miriam Rodríguez	Pop	"Desperté" "No Sé Quién Soy" "No Vuelvas"	Universal Music Spain
3	OOO	Rojuu	Electropop	"Ikari"	Independent
3	Otero Y Yo (Vol.1)	David Otero	Pop	"Una Foto en Blanco Y Negro"	Universal Spain
3	Titãs Trio Acústico EP 01	Titãs	Acoustic rock	"Sonífera Ilha"	Sony BMG
3	Terra	Daniel Minimalia	Instrumental		Rose
6	Soy Puro Teatro (Homenaje a La Lupe)	Mariaca Semprún	Tropical		Our Plays
10	Diario de un Niño Recién Curado	9ckles	Rap pop		Independent
10	Mas Amable	DJ Python	Ambient house		Incienso Records
10	The Fuel Mixtape by Ale Acosta	Fuel Fandango, Ale Acosta	Remix		Warner Music
14	Canciones Que Nos Marcaron	Piso 21	Latin pop		Star Arsis Entertainment
15	El Placer	Bryan Lopez	Reggaeton		Bisionary Entertainment
16	Pa´la Pista y Pa´l Pisto, Vol. 1	El Plan	Tejano		Indepe Music
17	Los 90 Piketes	Miky Woodz	Rap		Gold2
17	Miss Colombia	Lido Pimienta	Art Pop		Anti Records
17	Por Primera Vez	Camilo	Pop	"No Te Vayas" "Tutu" "Por Primera Vez" "Favorito" "El Mismo Aire"	Sony Music Latin
17	Energía Para Regalar	El Caribefunk	Tropical fusion		Independent
24	FERXXO (VOL. 1: M.O.R)	Feid	Urbano	"FRESH KERIAS" "PORFA" "ATEO" "BORRAXXA"	JP Entertainment
24	M.D.L.R. 2.0	Morad	Rap		M.L.D.R.
24	Tragedia Española	Confeti de Odio	Indie rock		TBD
24	It's Time	South TX Homies	Tejano		The M Group
30	Tu Rockcito Filarmónico	Tu Rockcito y Orquesta Filarmónica De Medellín	Children		Tu Rockcito

==== May ====
Day	Title	Artist	Genre(s)	Singles	Label	
1	Este es Nuestro Changüí	Grupo Changüi de Guantanamo	Tropical		Egrem	
8	Aire (Version Dia)	Jesse & Joy	Latin pop	"Tanto" "Lo Nuestro Vale Mas" "Alguien Mas"	Warner Music Mexico	
8	Colegio	Cali Y El Dandee	Latin pop		Universal Latino	
8	Un Canto por México, Vol. 1	Natalia Lafourcade	Folk	"Una Vida" "Veracruz"	Sony Music	
8	Sotavento	Compasses	Instrumental		EBD	
8	Universo do Canto Falado	RAPadura Xique-Chico	Latin alternative		Nibiru	
10	Las Que No Iban a Salir	Bad Bunny	Reggaeton	"En Casita" "Como Se Siente"	Rimas	
13	Trece	Andrés Cepeda	Latin pop		Sony Music Colombia	
14	Bien:(	C. Tangana	Pop rock	"Nunca Estoy" "Guille Asesino"	Sony Music	
14	Tradiciones	Afro-Peruvian Jazz Orchestra	Latin jazz		MVM Music	
15	El Androide	El Alfa	Dembow		El Jefe Records	
15	The Goat	Ñengo Flow	Urbano		Real G4	
15	Zeca	Pedro Jóia	Traditional		Independent	
15	Tentaciones Vol 1.	Charlie Cruz	Salsa		Get Crazy Note	
15	Voz de Mujer	Karen Lizarazo	Vallenato		Toro Music Group	
15	Te Encontré	Banda La Ejecutiva de Mazatlán Sinaloa	Banda		Fonovisa	
15	Mariposas	Omara Portuondo	Tropical music		Bis Music	
15	Historias Cantadas	Gaiteros de Pueblo Santo	Folk		Yawaro	
15	Aguije	Tierra Adentro	Folk		IDS Music, Hit Music 21	
15	Eu Feat. Você	Melim	Latin pop		Universal Music International	
15	Paseo Lunar	Lucky Band	Children's		Rainy Day Dimes Music	
15	Artistas de Profesión	Sophia	Children's		NB Music	
17	La Voz del Ave	Eddie Mora	Classical		Independent	
18	Festejo	Marcelo Jiran and Yamandu Costa	Instrumental		Independent	
19	Failde Con Tumbao	Orquesta Failde	Tropical		Egrem	
19	A Capella	Susana Baca	Folk		Editora Pregon, Play Music Perú	
19	Memórias 2 (Ao Vivo Em Belo Horizonte /2019)	Eli Soares	Latin Christian		Universal Music Christian Group	
21	The Genetics of Bachata	José Manuel Calderón	Bachata		Baile	
22	1 of 1	Sech	Reggaeton	"Si Te Vas" "Relación"	Rich Music	
22	Cumbiana	Carlos Vives	Latin pop	"No Te Vayas" "For Sale" "El Hilo" "Hechicera"	Sony Music Latin	
22	Gibraltar	Pelomono	Rock	"Malagueña"	Everlasting Records	
22	Mensajes de Voz	Alaina Castillo	Indie	"No Vuelvas a Mirar Atrás"	Chosen People Records	
22	MSDL - Canciones Dentro de Canciones	Vetusta Morla	Indie	"Palmeras en La Mancha" "Punto Sin Retorno" "Consejo de Sabios"	Pequeño Salto Mortal	
22	Véspera	Clã	Pop rock		Clã Lda	
22	Sigo Cantando al Amor	Jorge Celedón and Sergio Luis Rodríguez	Vallenato		Monterrey Music	
22	3:33	Debi Nova			Sony Music Latin	
22	Después de Todo	Yordano			Sony Music Latin	
22	Luna Nueva	Micaela Salaverry	Indie		Independent	
22	La Historia Continúa	Los Cardenales de Nuevo León	Norteño		Sony Music Latin	
22	Flamenco Sin Fronteras	Antonio Rey	Flamenco		Independent	
22	Canta y Juega	Tina Kids	Children's		Tina Kids	
23	Centraka	Zaki				
25	Atmosfera	Arthur Callazans	Latin Christian		Grace House Music	
26	Enquanto Estamos Distantes	As Baías	Latin pop		Universal Music International	
27	La Que Manda	Gina Chavez	Pop rock		Gina Chavez Music	
27	Bailando Contigo	Manny Cruz	Merengue		Manny Cruz, La Oreja Media Group	
28	Mesa Para Dos	Kany García	Latin pop	"Lo Que en Ti Veo"	Sony Music Latin	
28	40	Grupo Niche	Salsa		Sony Music Argentina	
28	29	AYAYAY!	Christian Nodal	Mariachi		Sony Music Latin
BRB Be Right Back	29	Guaynaa	Rap		AA Records	
Concierto Virtual en Tiempos de COVID-19	29	Rauw Alejandro	Live music		Sony Music Latin	
Corridos Tumbados Vol. 2	29	Natanael Cano	Regional Mexican		Rancho Humilde	
Emmanuel	29	Anuel AA	Trap rap	"Secreto" "China" "Fútbol Y Rumba" "Hasta Que Dios Diga"	LLC	
Mala	29	Mala Rodríguez	Latin pop	"Tenamoras" "Dame Bien" "Peleadora"	Universal Spain	
Pausa	29	Ricky Martin	Latin pop	"Cántalo" "Tiburones"	Sony Music Latin	
Posible	29	Enrique Bunbury	Latin rock		Sony Music Latin	
Siento Muerte	29	Mujeres	Indie		Primavera Labels	
Compadres	29	Andrés Cepeda and Fonseca	Latin pop		Sony Music Colombia	
40	29	Grupo Niche	Salsa		PPM USA	
Ahora	29	Eddy Herrera	Merengue		Intermusic	
Larimar	29	Daniel Santacruz	Bachata		Penluis Music	
Ícono	29	Orquesta Aragón	Tropical		Penluis Music	
Antologia de la Música Ranchera, Vol. 1	29	Aida Cuevas	Mariachi		Cuevas	
Playlist	29	Chiquis Rivera	Banda		Fonovisa	
Película, Vol. 1	29	Siggno	Tejano		Azteca	
Quinteto Con Voz	29	Quinteto Leopoldo Federico	Folk		Giovanni Parra, Teatro Colsubsidio Roberto Arias Pérez	
Viva Kids Vol. 2	29	Thalía	Children's Music	Mí No Cumpleaños	Sony Music Latin	
Belo Horizonte	29	Toninho Horta and Orquestra Fantasma	MPB		Minas	

==== June ====
Day	Title	Artist	Genre(s)	Singles	Label
5	Descanso En Poder	Dellafuente	Rap	"Yalo Yale" "Nubes"	Sony Music
5	Noche de Travesuras	Lunay	Urbano		Star Island
12	Catarsis	Edurne	Pop	"Demasiado Tarde"	Must Producciones
12	Chachichacho	Bejo	Rap	"Rao Largo" "Pero Ya No" "Mucho"	8=D Records
12	Vida Encontré	Majo & Dan	Latin Christian		CanZions
12	Platónicos	Majo & Dan	Latin Christian		CanZions
15	Nana, Tom, Vinicius	Nana Caymmi	Bossa nova		SESC-SP
18	A Bolha	Vitor Kley	Pop		Midas Music
18	Fôlego	Scalene	Brazilian rock		Slap
19	Andrés Suárez	Andrés Suárez	Pop	"Despiértame" "No Diré" "Nina" "Un Solo Día" "6 De La Mañana"	Warner Music Spain
19	De Vent i Ales	Txarango	Catalan rumba		Halley Records
19	En Casa	Natalia Lacunza	Acoustic		Universal Spain
19	Menta	Menta	Indie Pop		Sonido Muchacho
19	Sigo a lo Mío	Abraham Mateo	Latin pop		Sony Music Latin
19	Translation	Black Eyed Peas	Latin pop	"Ritmo (Bad Boys for Life)" "Mamacita" "Feel the Beat"	Epic Records
19	Tropical Jesus	Carlos Sadness	Tropical pop	"Aloha" "Soñé Contigo" "Ciclo Lunar" "Todo Estaba Bien"	Sony Music
21	Arraiá Da Veveta	Ivete Sangalo	Folk		Universal Music
22	Bruma: Celebrating Milton Nascimento	Antonio Adolfo	Latin jazz		AAM Music
24	24	Duki	Rap, trap		SSJ Records
26	Amarillo	David Rees	Pop		Warner Music Spain
26	Como Ves, No Siempre He Sido Mía...	Belén Aguilera	Pop/R&B	"Mía" "Búnker" "Tu Piel"	Universal Spain
26	KiCk i	Arca	Avant-pop	"Nonbinary" "Time" "Mequetrefe" "KLK"	XL Recordings
26	Konbanwa	Sticky M.A.	Rap pop	"Mami Dónde Estás?" "Haribo" "Extendo" "Ya No"	Agorazein
26	Mes Excentricitès, Vol. 2	Mónica Naranjo	Pop		Missis Oranges
26	TDPS 2	Cecilio G	Trap		TDPS
26	Tengo Que Calmarme	Pol Granch	Pop	"M Conformo" "En Llamas" "Millonario" "Chocolatito"	Sony Music Spain
26	Trap Tumbado	Natanael Cano	Regional Mexican		Rancho Humilde
26	Alma de Pura Raza	Paco Candela	Flamenco		Candelarte
28	Claudio Santoro: A Obra Integral para Violoncelo e Piano	Hugo Pilger and Ney Fialkow	Classical		Independent

=== Third quarter ===
==== July ====
Day	Title	Artist	Genre(s)	Singles	Label
3	Desconfination	Stay Homas	Indie pop		Sony Music Spain
3	Desclasificados	Alizzz	Trap		Warner Music Spain
3	Sintiéndolo Mucho	María Escarmiento	Trap pop	"Amargo Amor" "Castigo" "Chulo"	Universal Music Spain
3	Titãs Trio Acústico EP 02	Titãs	Acoustic rock	"Enquanto Houver Sol"	Sony BMG
3	Flores	Marca MP			
10	Al Borde de un Tiempo Perdido	Strange Color	Dream pop		Devil in the Woods
10	La Película del Sol	Monmarte	Indie		Independent
10	Las 5 Mejores	Jeanette	Canción melódica		Warner Music Spain
10	Al Estilo Rancherón	Los Dos Carnales	Norteño		AfinArte Music
10	Será Que Você Vai Acreditar?	Fernanda Takai	Pop		Deck
10	Canções d'Além-mar	Zeca Baleiro	MPB		Saravá Discos
17	Nudity	Glass Cristina	Neo-soul		Vegan Canibal Records
17	Orgánico	Brytiago	Urbano		Duars Entertainment
17	The Way of Queen	Ivy Queen	Latin pop	"Un Baile Mas" "La Roca"	NKS Music
17	Vibras de Noche	Eslabon Armado	Regional Mexican		DEL Records
17	Beethoven: Révolution, Symphonies 1 à 5	Jordi Savall and Le Concert des Nations	Classical		Alia Vox
23	Canto da Praya – Ao Vivo	Hamilton de Holanda and Mestrinho	Instrumental		Deck
24	Atrevido	Trueno	Trap		NEUEN
24	Jimmy Humilde Presenta Lo Mejor De Los 90's	Various artists	Regional Mexican		Jimmy Humilde Music
24	Now Or Never	Nio Garcia, Casper Magico	Reggaeton		Flow La Movie, Inc
24	Ofrenda a la Tormenta	Fernando Velázquez	BSO		Atresmúsica
24	Play Tour: En Directo	Aitana	Live		Universal Spain
24	Cristovão Bastos e Rogério Caetano	Cristovão Bastos and Rogério Caetano	Instrumental		Biscoito Fino
30	Álbum Rosa	A Cor do Som	Brazilian rock		Boogie Woogie
30	Blanco	Ricardo Arjona			
31	La Noche Ke Me Muera	Juicy BAE	Trap		Dirty Voice Records
31	Puerta Abierta, Vol. 1	El Fantasma	Regional Mexican		Afinarte Music
31	Quien Contra Mí 2	Yandel	Reggaeton		Sony Music Latin

==== August ====
Day	Title	Artist	Genre(s)	Singles	Label
6	Onze (Músicas Inéditas de Adoniran Barbosa)	Various artists	Samba		Dorsal Musik
7	Viva el Perreo	Jowell & Randy	Reggaeton	"Anaranjado"	Rimas
7	Latin American Classics	Kristhyan Benitez	Classical		Steinway & Sons
10	Barras Bravas	Natos Y Waor	Rap	"Kurt Cobain" "Hasta el Amanecer" "Alcatraz"	Sonido Muchacho
14	Brazil305	Gloria Estefan	Samba	"Cuando Hay Amor"	Crescent Moon
14	El trabajo es la suerte	Banda Sinaloense MS de Sergio Lizárraga	Banda		Lizos Music
21	20 -- 21	Reik	Latin pop	"Lo Intenté Todo"	Sony Music
21	Papi Juancho	Maluma	Reggaeton	"ADMV" "Hawái"	Sony Music Latin
21	En Español	The Mavericks	Country		Mono Mundo Music
21	348	Federico Pereiro	Tango		Mono Mundo Music
21	Iceberg	Priscila Tossan			Universal Music International
28	Back to Rockport	Kidd Keo	Trap	"Demons"	WEA Latina
28	Del Horno a La Boca	Carolina Durante	Rock	"La Canción Que Creo Que No Te Mereces" "El Parque De Las Balas" "Lo Segundo, Ya No Tanto"	Sonido Muchacho
28	En Casa Limón	David Broza	Acoustic	"Tears for Barcelona"	S-Curve Records
28	Hortera	Varry Brava	Pop	"Loco" "Luces de Neón"	Universal Spain
28	Libertad	Agoney	Latin R&B	"Quizás" "Black" "Más"	Universal Music Spain
28	Los Chulitos	De La Ghetto	Reggaeton	"El Que Se Enamora Pierde"	WEA Latina
28	De Buenos Aires para el Mundo	Los Ángeles Azules	Cumbia		Disa
28	Una Niña Inútil	Cazzu	Latin R&B		UMG Recordings

==== September ====
Day	Title	Artist	Genre(s)	Singles	Label
2	Cruisin' with Junior H	Junior H			Warner Music Latina
3	Sarah Farias (Ao Vivo)	Sarah Farias	Latin Christian		Mk Music
4	El Camino Que No Me Llevó a Roma	Bely Basarte	Pop	"Roma"	Universal Spain
4	El Secreto	Azúcar Moreno	Flamenco pop	"La Cura"	BMG
4	Enoc	Ozuna	Reggaeton	"Caramelo"	Sony Music Latin
4	Mariah en Español	Mariah Carey	Latin pop	"Mi Todo"	Columbia Records
4	Ruido de Fondo	Sidecars	Indie pop	"Mundo Imperfecto" "La Noche en Calma"	Warner Music Spain
4	Colegas	Gilberto Santa Rosa	Salsa		InnerCat Music Group
4	Amor Pasado	Leonel García	Folk		InnerCat Music Group
4	Patroas	Marília Mendonça and Maiara & Maraisa	Sertanejo		Som Livre
8	Redención	Aline Barros	Latin Christian		Sony Music Brasil
9	Soy El Nata	Natanael Cano			Warner Music Latina
10	Bahia Ducati (EP)	Feid	Reggaeton	"PORFA (Remix)"	Universal Latin
11	Capricornio	David DeMaría	New flamenco	"Maneras de Pensar"	Warner Music Spain
11	El Viejo Boxeador	Marwan	Pop rock	"El Viejo Boxeador" "La Pareja Interminable"	Sony Music
11	Fuego en Castilla	El Meister	Soft rock	"Loco Mundo" "Doce de Cada Diez"	Subterfuge Records
11	No Era Sólida	Lucrecia Dalt	Electroacoustic	"Disuelta" "Seca"	RVNG Intl.
11	Un Disco	Amatria	Rock	"Un Amor" "Una Rápida"	Vanana Records
11	Guárdame Esta Noche	El Fantasma	Regional Mexican		Afinarte Music
11	De México	Reik	Latin pop		Sony Music Mexico
16	Fragma	Amanda Magalhães	Black music, samba, MPB, soul, funk, R&B	"Saiba" "O Amor Te Dá" "Talismã"	Boia Fria Produções
17	Munay	Pedro Capó	Latin pop		Sony Music Latin
18	Un Susurro A la Tormenta	La Oreja de Van Gogh	Pop	"Abrázame" "Te Pareces Tanto a Mí"	Sony Music
24	Amor	Israel Fernández and Diego Del Morao	Flamenco		Universal Music Spain
25	Bachata D'Veras	Joe Veras	Bachata		Josiel Records
25	El Senyal Que Esperaves	Els Amics de les Arts	Indie	"El Meu Cos"	Universal Spain
25	Flores Negras	Alberto & García	Indie	"Verano"	Boomerang
25	La Sobra del Milagro	Mar Pareja	Rock		Clifford Records
25	Ya Dormiré Cuando Me Muera	Ginebras	Bubblegum rock	"Chico Pum"	Universal Spain
25	Titãs Trio Acústico EP 03	Titãs	Acoustic rock	"Pra Dizer Adeus"	Sony BMG
25	Do Coração	Sara Correia	Fado		Universal Music Portugal
26	Tempo de Romance	Chitãozinho & Xororó	Sertanejo		Onda Musical
27	Assim Tocam Os Meus Tambores	Marcelo D2	Hip hop		Altafonte

=== Fourth-quarter ===
==== October ====
Day	Title	Artist	Genre(s)	Singles	Label
2	Agüita	Gabriel Garzón-Montano	R&B	"Agüita"	Jagjaguwar
2	Calambre	Nathy Peluso	Hip hop	"Business Woman" "Buenos Aires" "Sana Sana"	Sony Music Latin
2	Farsa (género imposible)	Sílvia Pérez Cruz	New flamenco	"Grito Pelao" "Todas las Madres del Mundo"	Universal Spain
2	Posmodernia	Las Ardillas de Dakota	Rock	"En Esta Ciudad"	Clifford Records
2	Es Diferente	Porte Diferente			
2	Transparency	Dafnis Prieto Sextet	Latin jazz		
9	Con Los Pies En El Suelo	Cepeda	Pop	"Gentleman" "Si Tú Existieras"	Universal Spain
9	Canciones de Amor y Odio, Vol. 1	Leone	Rock	"Nuevo Día"	Clifford Records
9	Universo Invertido	Wanessa Camargo	Pop	"Lábios de Navalha"	Independent
10	Diez	La Energía Norteña	Norteño		Azteca
14	Bom Mesmo É Estar Debaixo D'Água	Luedji Luna	MPB		Luedji Luna
15	Los Mesoneros Live Desde Pangea	Los Mesoneros	Rock		Music Marketing Plans
15	Conquistas (Ao Vivo)	Os Barões da Pisadinh	Sertanejo		Sony Music Brasil
16	Darle La Vuelta	La Pegatina	Rumba	"Darle La Vuelta"	Universal Spain
16	Las Montañas	Delaporte	Electropop	"Las Montañas"	Mad Moon Music
16	Lilith	María Rodés	Indie pop	"Pelo Rojo"	Satélite K
16	Lo Que Me Dé La Gana	Dani Martín	Latin pop	"Los Huesos"	Sony Music Latin
16	Supercrepus II	Joe Crepúsculo	Indie pop	"Discoteca en Ruinas"	El Volcán
16	Hora Dorada	Anagrace	Latin Christian		Passionatus Music Group
16	Los Favoritos 2	Arcángel			
22	Las Locuras Mías	Silvestre Dandong	Valleanto	"Las Locuras Mías	Sony Music Latin
22	Un Beso Es Suficiente	Vilax	Tejano		Warner Music Spain
23	Siete veces sí	Vanesa Martin	Pop	TBA	Warner Music Spain
23	De Vieja Escuela	Gera Demara	Norteño		Casa Nacional
23	Sentido	Leonardo Gonçalves	Latin Christian		Sony Music Brasil
26	Do Meu Coração Nu	Zé Manoel	MPB		Zé Manoel
30	Avionica	Antonio Orozco	Pop	"Hoy"	Universal Music Group
30	El Árbol Y El Bosque	Rozalén	Pop	"Este Tren"	Sony Music Spain
30	La Vida a Mi Manera	María Jiménez	New flamenco	"La Vida"	Universal Spain
30	Levántate Y Muere	La Polla Records	Live	"Ellos Dicen Mierda"	Cultura Rock Records
30	Los Edificios Que Se Derrumban	La Trinidad	Indie	"España Invertebrada"	Sonido Muchacho
30	Silencio	María Blaya	Bedroom pop	"De Mi Para Ti"	Independent
30	El Papá De La Bachata, Su Legado	Luis Segura	Bachata		EGREM
30	O Bar Me Chama	Velhas Virgens			Gabaju
30	Sempre Se Pode Sonhar (Ao Vivo)	Paulinho da Viola			Samba

==== November ====
Day	Title	Artist	Genre(s)	Singles	Label
1	Music from Cuba and Spain, Sierra: Sonata para Guitarra	Manuel Barrueco	Classical		J&N
5	Legendarios	Billos	Tropical		J&N
5	Otra Vuelta al Sol	Cantoalegre	Children		Cantoalegre
6	La Gran Belleza	Marazu	Pop	"Años"	Universal Spain
13	Afrodisíaco	Rauw Alejandro	Reggaeton	"Tattoo"	Sony Music Latin
13	Nada	Samantha	Pop	"Quiero Que Vuelvas"	Universal Spain
13	Libra	Lali	Pop	"Pa Que Me Quieras"	Ariola Records
13	El Reflejo	Rayos Láser	Pop rock		Geiser Discos
15	Nanas Consentidoras	Victoria Sur	Children		Millenium M&E
18	Sin Miedo (del Amor y Otros Demonios) ∞	Kali Uchis	Alternative R&B	"La Luz"	Interscope
19	Eli Soares 10 Anos	Eli Soares	Latin Christian		Universal Music Brasil
20	#MadridNuclear	Leiva	Rock	"Lobos"	Universal Spain
20	Iceberg	Miki Núñez	Folk-pop	"Me Vale"	Universal Spain
20	Rio: Só Vendo A Vista	Martinho Da Vila	Samba		Sony Music Brasil
20	Orín, a Língua dos Anjos	Orquestra Afrosinfônica	Folk		Máquina De Louco Edições Musicais
20	Eu e Vocês	Elba Ramalho	Folk		Acauã Produtora
26	Goldo Funky	Akapellah	Urbano		Universal Music Mexico
26	Canciones de Cuna	Mi Casa Es Tu Casa	Children		Mi Casa Es Tu Casa
27	Canciones Que Me Gustan	Isabel Pantoja	Copla	"Enamórate"	Altafonte
27	El Último Tour del Mundo	Bad Bunny	Trap · indie rock	"Dakiti"	Rimas
27	El Niño	Selecta	Rap		Helsinkipro
27	La Broma Infinita	Taburete	Pop	"El último baile de Dunas Mitchell"	Voltereta Records
27	Raphel 6.0	Raphael	Duet		Warner

==== December ====
Day	Title	Artist	Genre(s)	Singles	Label
3	Un Nuevo Universo	Pepe De Lucía	Flamenco		Universal Music Spain
4	Doleré	Hugo Cobo	Pop	"Intenta Olvidarme"	Sony Spain
4	Tini Tini Tini	TINI	Latin Pop	"Oye" "22" "Suéltate El Pelo" "Fresa" "Recuerdo" "Ella Dice" "Duele" "Un Beso en Madrid" "Te Olvidaré" "Playa"	Hollywood Records
4	Visión Túnel	Cruz Cafuné	Rap	"Ghostéame"	Mècén Entertainment
4	A Mis 80's	Vicente Fernández	Ranchera		Sony Music Mexico
4	Renacer	Nahuel Pennisi	Instrumental		Sony Music Argentina
4	Pra Ouvir No Fone	Michel Teló	Instrumental		Som Livre
7	En Barranquilla Me Quedo (Homenaje a Joe Arroyo	Various artists	Salsa		Babel Discos
11	11 Razones	Aitana	Pop rock	"+" "Corazón Sin Vida" "11 Razones"	Universal Spain
11	Agua	Stay Homas	Pop	"Volver a Empezar"	Independent
11	Curso de Levitación Intensivo	Enrique Bunbury	Rock		Warner Music Spain
11	Vértigo	Pablo Alborán	Latin ballad	"Si Hubieras Querido"	Warner Music Spain
11	Entretiempo y Tiempo	Omar Acosta and Sergio Menem	Instrumental		The Orchard
11	Emidoinã	André Abujamra	Brazilian rock		André Abujamr
18	Mood	Anaju	Alternative pop	"Rota"	Sony Spain
18	Unikornio: Once Millones de Versos Después de Ti	Pablo López	Pop	"Mariposa"	Universal Spain
18	Corta Venas	Eslabon Armado			
18	El Muñeco	Tito El Bambino	Reggaeton	"I Love You" "Por Ti" "Sexy Sensual"	On Fire Music
19	Firme Albor	Luys Bien	Latin	"¿Dónde Está?" "Tu Castigo" "Lucero" "El Siembra-Yuca" "Porque Me Amas"	Independent
22	Nos Divertimos Logrando Lo Imposible	Grupo Firme	Banda		Music VIP Entertainment
23	Le Chill	Chill Chicos	Indie pop	"Si Volvemos a Querernos"	Independent
25	Privé	Juan Luis Guerra	Pop		Universal Music Latino
25	Para Los Que Conocen El Rollo	Herencia de Patrones			
26	La Isla	Rels B	Urban pop	"Un Verano en Mallorca"	Sony Music
30	Díaz Antes	Álvaro Díaz	Rap-pop		UMG Latino

== Year-End ==
=== Performance in the United States ===
==== Albums ====
The following is a list of the 10 best-performing Latin albums in the United States according to Billboard and Nielsen SoundScan, which compiles data from traditional sales and album-equivalent units. Equivalent album units are based on album sales, track equivalent albums (10 tracks sold equals one album sale), and streaming equivalent albums (3,750 ad-supported streams or 1,250 paid subscription streams equals one album sale).

Rank	Album	Artist
1	YHLQMDLG	Bad Bunny
2	X 100pre	Bad Bunny
3	Emmanuel	Anuel AA
4	Las que no iban a salir	Bad Bunny
5	Oasis	J Balvin and Bad Bunny
6	Todavía Me Amas: Lo Mejor de Aventura	Aventura
7	Odisea	Ozuna
8	Colores	J Balvin
9	Corridos Tumbados	Natanael Cano
10	Famouz	Jhay Cortez

==== Songs ====
The following is a list of the 10 best-performing Latin songs in the United States according to Billboard and Nielsen SoundScan, which compiles data from streaming activity, digital sales and radio airplay.

Rank	Single	Artist
1	"Ritmo (Bad Boys for Life)"	The Black Eyed Peas and J Balvin
2	"Tusa"	Karol G and Nicki Minaj
3	"Vete"	Bad Bunny
4	"Yo Perreo Sola"	Bad Bunny
5	"Safaera"	"Bad Bunny, Jowell & Randy and Ñengo Flow"
6	"La Dificil"	Bad Bunny
7	"Sigues Con Él"	Arcángel and Sech
8	"Mamacita"	The Black Eyed Peas, Ozuna and J. Rey Soul
9	"Si Veo a Tu Mamá"	Bad Bunny
10	"La Jeepeta"	Nio Garcia, Anuel AA, Myke Towers, Brray, and Juanka

=== Airplay in Latin America ===
The following is a list of the 10 most-played Latin songs on radio stations in Latin America in the tracking period of January 1, 2020 through November 30, 2020, according to Monitor Latino.

Rank	Single	Artist	Spins
1	"Tusa"	Karol G and Nicki Minaj	2,530,000,000,000
2	"Hawai"	Maluma featuring The Weeknd	1,940,000,000,000
3	"Tattoo"	Rauw Alejandro featuring Camilo	1,810,000,000,000
4	"Morado"	J Balvin	1,610,000,000,000
5	"ADMV"	Maluma	1,590,000,000,000
6	"Caramelo"	Ozuna featuring Karol G and	1,570,000,000,000
7	"Sigues Con Él"	Arcángel featuring Romeo Santos and Sech	1,530,000,000,000
8	"Fantasias"	Rauw Alejandro featuring Anuel AA, Farruko, Lunay, and Natti Natasha	1,470,000,000,000
9	"Favorito"	Camilo	1,460,000,000,000
10	"Relacion"	Sech, Daddy Yankee, and J Balvin featuring Farruko and Rosalía	1,430,000,000,000

== Deaths ==
- January 4 – Puerto Plata, 96, Dominican singer and guitarist.
- January 10:
  - Carlos "Cuco" Rojas, 67, Colombian harpist.
  - Edeor de Paula, 87, Brazilian samba composer
- January 14 – Chamín Correa, 90, Mexican guitarist.
- January 17:
  - Claudio Roditi, 73, Brazilian-born American trumpeter, prostate cancer.
  - Juan Carlos Saravia, 89, singer, songwriter, and founding member of Los Chalchaleros
- January 27:
  - Alberto Naranjo, 78, Venezuelan musician.
  - Lucho Servidio, Argentine composer, arranger, and conductor
- February 14 – Catalino Parra, founding member of Los Gaiteros de San Jacinto
- March 4 – Adelaide Chiozzo, 88, Brazilian actress, accordionist and singer
- March 10 – Marcelo Peralta, 59, Argentine multi-instrumentalist and composer (COVID-19)
- March 21 – Ray Mantilla, 85, American percussionist, complications from lymphoma.
- March 22 – Carmen de Mairena (Miguel Brau i Gou), 87, Spanish cuplé singer
- March 26 – Naomi Munakata, 64, Japanese-Brazilian conductor, COVID-19.
- March 30 – Riachão, 98, Brazilian samba composer and singer
- March 31 – Rafael BerrioSpanish singer and songwriter
- April 5 – Luis Eduardo Aute, 76, Filipino-born Spanish artist.
- April 9 – Andy González, 69, American jazz and Latin dance bassist.
- April 13 – Moraes Moreira, 72, Brazilian guitarist and singer (Novos Baianos), heart attack.
- April 15 – Joe Torres, 76, Panamanian American pianist
- April 18 – Alejandro Algara, 92, Mexican tenor
- April 20 – Horacio Fontova, 73, Argentine singer, actor and comedian, cancer.
- April 22 – Marcos Mundstock, 77, Argentine musician, comedian and actor (Les Luthiers), brain tumor.
- April 25 – Arturo Huizar, 62, singer, member of Luzbel
- April 30 – Óscar Chávez, 85, Mexican singer, songwriter and actor, COVID-19.
- May 1 – Tavo Limongi, 52, Mexican guitarist and singer (Resorte)
- May 4 – Aldir Blanc, 73, Brazilian songwriter, COVID-19.
- May 5 – Ciro Pessoa, 62, Brazilian singer-songwriter (Titãs, Cabine C), journalist and poet, complications from cancer and COVID-19.
- May 10 – David Corrêa, 82, Brazilian singer-songwriter, kidney failure brought on by COVID-19.
- May 13 – Yoshio, 70, Mexican singer, COVID-19.
- May 14 – Jorge Santana, 68, Mexican guitarist (Malo)
- May 15 – Sergio Denis, 71, Argentine singer, songwriter and actor
- May 25 – Otto de la Rocha, 86, Nicaraguan singer, songwriter and actor
- May 28 – Charlie Monttana, 58, Mexican rock urbano singer, heart attack.
- July 3 – Tânio Mendonça, 52, Brazilian samba composer
- June 4 – Fabiana Anastácio, 45, Brazilian CCM singer (COVID-19)
- June 9 – Pau Donés, 53, Spanish songwriter, guitarist, and vocalist
- June 10 – Rosita Fornés, 97, Cuban-American actress (Musical Romance, The Unknown Mariachi) and singer, complications from emphysema.
- June 26 – Narcisa Toldrà, 96, Spanish singer and musician
- June 28 – Manuel Donley, 92, Mexican-born Tejano singer and musician
- July 11 – Iñaxi Etxabe, 87, Spanish bertsolari singer
- July 16 – Víctor Víctor, 71, Dominican singer-songwriter and guitarist, COVID-19.
- July 18:
  - Martha Flores, 91, Cuban radio host, journalist and singer
  - El Dany, 31, Cuban singer and member of duo Yomil & El Dany,
- August 11 – Trini Lopez, 83, American singer ("If I Had a Hammer", "Lemon Tree") and actor (The Dirty Dozen), complications from COVID-19.
- August 21 – Pedro Azael, Panamanian composer and musician
- September 7:
  - Frank Lebrón, 64, Puerto Rican percussionist
  - Xavier Ortiz, 48, Mexican actor (Journey from the Fall, Un gancho al corazón), singer (Garibaldi) and television host, suicide.
- September 10 – Tommy "Chucky" López, American percussionist
- September 11 – Jota Mayúscula Spanish DJ and producer
- September 12 – Joaquín Carbonell, 73, Spanish singer-songwriter and poet (COVID-19)
- September 14 – Alicia Maguiña, 81, Peruvian composer and singer
- September 22 – Ramona Galarza, 80, Argentine folk singer
- October 3 – Anthony Galindo, 41, Venezuelan singer (Menudo, MDO), suicide.
- October 8 – Gabo Ferro Argentine singer, 54, songwriter, actor
- October 18 – José Padilla, 64, Spanish DJ (Café del Mar) and producer, colon cancer.
- October 28 – Cano Estremera, 62, Puerto Rican salsa singer
- November 1:
  - Pedro Iturralde, 91, Spanish saxophonist and composer.
  - Esteban Santos, Spanish guitarist and singer
- November 11:
  - Adrian Cionco, 48, Argentine bass player
  - José Ángel Medina, 51, Mexican musician and founder of Patrulla 81
- November 18 – José "Pepe" Quintana, Mexican producer
- November 20 – Pedro Iturralde, 91, Spanish saxophonist and composer.
- November 25 – Flor Silvestre, 90, Mexican singer ("Cielo rojo"), actress (The Soldiers of Pancho Villa, Ánimas Trujano) and equestrienne.
- November 30 – Jerry Demara, 42, Regional Mexican singer
- December 11 – Ubirany, 80, Brazilian musician (Fundo de Quintal; COVID-19)
- December 26 – Tito Rojas, 65, Puerto Rican salsa singer, heart attack.
- December 28 – Armando Manzanero, 85, Mexican singer-songwriter ("Somos Novios (It's Impossible)", "Mía", "Adoro"), Grammy winner (2014), COVID-19.
- December 31 – Juliano Cezar, 58, Brazilian sertanejo singer
