= Valentina (2021 film) =

- Film poster
- Spanish: Valentina
- Directed by: Chelo Loureiro
- Written by: Chelo Loureiro; Lúa Testa
- Starring: Lucia Seren; Alicia Rábade; Maria Manuela; Andrés Suárez Otero
- Music by: Nani Garcia
- Production companies: Abano Producións; Antaruxa; El Gatoverde Producciones; Sparkle animation
- Distributed by: Super 8 Distribution
- Release date: December 10, 2021
- Running time: 65 minutes
- Country: Spain
- Language: Spanish
- Box office: €52.291,85

Valentina (Spanish: Valentina) is a 2021 Galician computer-animated family film directed by Chelo Loureiro. It's Chelo Loureiro's first feature film as a director. It was created with Abano Producioness (Galicia, Spain) and Sparkle Animation (Portugal) in 2D and 3D. The film was scheduled to premiere in June 2021 but was postponed until December 10 of that year. Valentina's official premiereValentina, he was nominated for best animated feature film at the Goya Awards.

== Plot ==
Valentina is a girl with Down syndrome who dreams of being a trapeze. However, he believes he will never be able to achieve it. Her grandmother, who plays with her, also has a desire, to become an orchestra director.

== Voice cast ==
- Lucia Seren as Valentina
- Alicia Rábade as Valentina (voice of the song)
- Maria Manuela as a grandmother
- Andrés Suárez Otero as Dad and King
- Trane Testa as Mom and Queen
- Uxía Senlle as Doña Lola
- Coke Couto as a bishop
- Helga Mendez as a horse
- Pilocha as Doña Flor
