= David Otero =

David Otero Martín
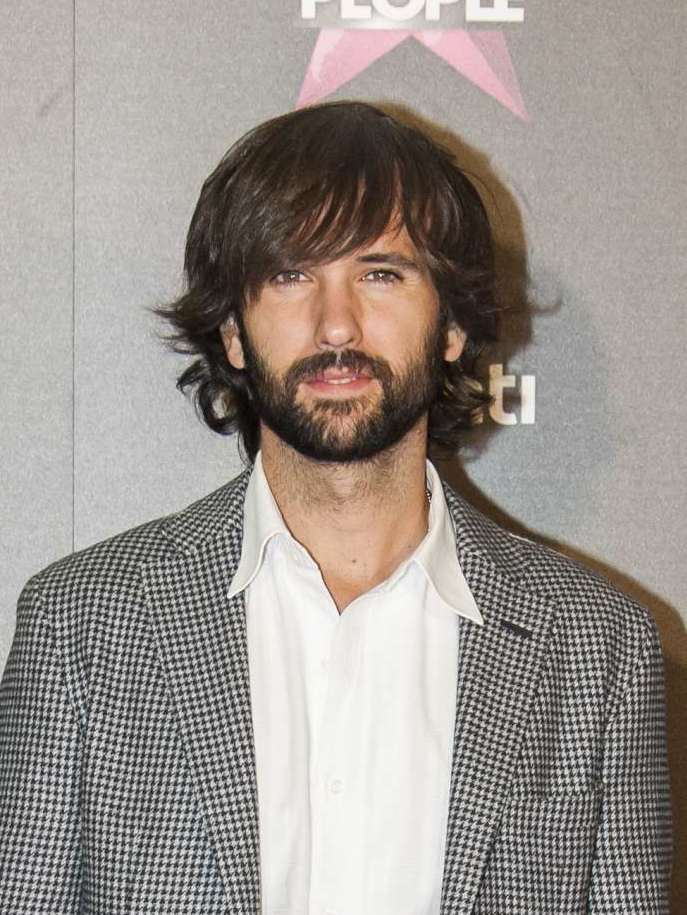
- Otero in 2015
- Born: David Otero Martín; 17 April 1980 (age 46); Madrid, Spain
- Other names: El Pescao
- Occupations: Singer; songwriter; guitarist
- Years active: 2000–present
- Musical career
- Genres: Pop rock; rock
- Label: Sony
- Website: davidotero.com.es

David Otero Martín (born 17 April 1980) is a Spanish singer, guitarist and composer. He was a member of the pop rock band El Canto del Loco (1994–2010).

After the band's break-up in 2010, Otero started a solo career as "El Pescao" (the fish). In 2017, Otero started performing under his own name.

== History ==
Otero was a composer and guitarist with El Canto del Loco. The band broke up in 2010 after ten years together.

David started his solo musical career as "El Pescao", an alias inspired by a song he composed for the album Zapatillas by El Canto del Loco. His first solo album "Nada Lógico", released in 2010, reached number two on the Top sellers charts in Spain. The single sold over 30,000 copies and received the Golden Record certification.

After a three-year long Spanish tour with over 280 shows, Otero released a special edition of his last album called"Un viaje nada lógico" (2011). This album was followed by an EP titled "Ciao Pescao" (2012).

After the release of Ciao Pescao, Otero moved to Argentina for a year to prepare for this next album. In October 2014, Otero released "Ultramar". It contained 11 songs composed in Buenos Aires and recorded in London.

Otero finished the Ultramar Tour with more than 70 shows in Spain, six shows in Mexico in 2015 (Monterrey, Puebla and Mexico D.F), wit four sold-out shows in Mexico City. He played four shows in Buenos Aires over the previous five years.

In 2017, Otero discarded the "El Pescao" stage name and released the album "David Otero". In 2018, following a tour throughout Spain, Mexico, and Argentina, David released a new album "1980". The song "Precipicio al Mar" from that album led to David's first book, published with the song's name.

In 2020, Otero started work on a new album, which was to include a number of his previous hits and feature collaborations with other Spanish artists. On 24 January 2020, he released a new version of Una Foto en Blanco y Negro with Taburete . Later that year, Otero released three singles:

- "Buscando el Sol" with Bely Basarte
- "Aire" with Georgina and Funambulista
- "Como tú"

Together with the new version of "Una Foto en Blanco y Negro", these four songs comprised the first volume of the new album.

On 22 May, a new single came out: a new version of El Canto del Loco's Tal Como Eres, with Cepeda’s collaboration.

== Discography ==
Nada-Lógico (October Music & Sony/BMG), release 7 September 2010.

Song title	Artist
"Te pido perdón (I apologize)"	David Otero
"Buscando el sol"	David Otero
"La luna va y viene "	David Otero
"Castillo de arena "	David Otero
"Me da lo mismo"	David Otero
"Cada día"	David Otero
"Otro color"	David Otero
"Historia de terror"	David Otero
"La luz oscura del mar"	David Otero
"Tú y yo"	David Otero
"Ramón"	David Otero
"Como me ves me voy"	David Otero
"Máscara de pena"	David Otero
"Deja de respirar"	David Otero
"No soy nadie"	David Otero
"Máscara de pena"	David Otero
"acústico"	David Otero
"Historia de terror"	David Otero
"acústico"	David Otero
"La luz oscura del mar"	David Otero
"acústico"	David Otero
"Buscando el sol"	David Otero
"acústico"	David Otero

Ciao Pescao 1.-Todo se complica 2.-El mundo de los recuerdos 3.-Corazón de cristal 4.-Que no te llamen loco

== Personal life ==
David Otero is Dani Martin's cousin. Otero is married to his manager Marina Roveta and he is father of two children, Luna and Gael.
