= Pedro Capó discography =

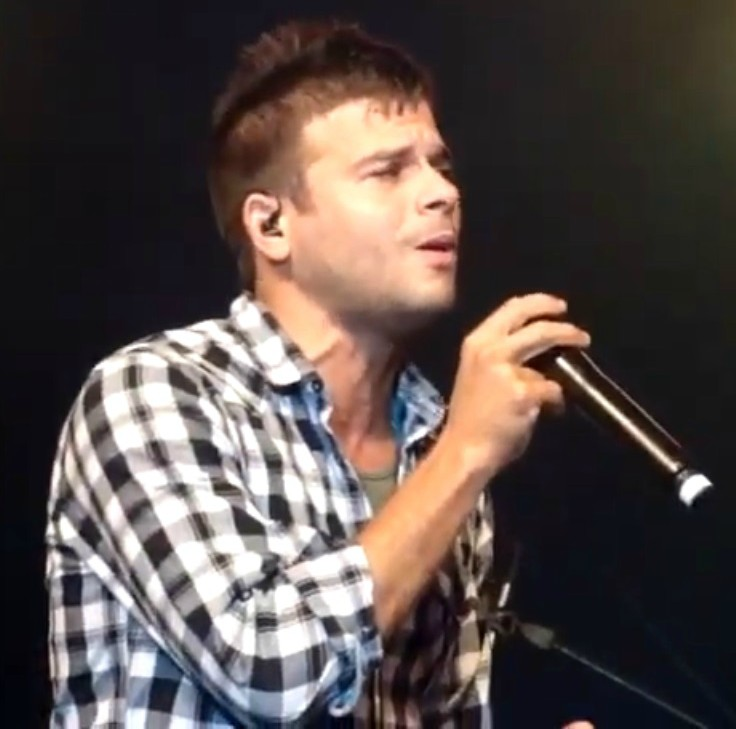
- Studio albums: 4
- Singles: 19

Puerto Rican singer Pedro Capó has released four studio albums and nineteen singles. In 2018, he gained worldwide popularity after the release of his single "Calma", which was remixed multiple times to include Farruko, Alicia Keys and Alan Walker.

== Albums ==
=== Studio albums ===
List of studio albums, with selected details and chart positions
Title	Studio album details	Peak chart positions		Certifications
Title	Studio album details	US Latin	US Latin Pop	Certifications
Fuego y Amor	Released: 18 December 2007; Label: Sony BMG; Format: CD, digital download	—	—	
Pedro Capó	Released: 19 September 2011; Label: Sony Latin; Format: CD, digital download	58	18	
Aquila	Released: 12 August 2014; Label: Sony Latin; Format: CD, digital download	3	2	
En Letra de Otro	Released: 11 August 2017; Label: Sony Latin; Format: CD, digital download	5	2	
Munay	Released: 17 September 2020; Label: Sony Latin; Format: CD, digital download	—	6	CAPIF: Diamond; RIAA: 4× Platinum (Latin)
"—" denotes a recording that did not chart or was not released in that territory.

== Singles ==
=== As lead artist ===
List of singles as lead artist, with selected chart positions and certifications, showing year released and album name
Title	Year	Peak chart positions										Certifications	Album
Title	Year	US	US Latin	US Latin Pop	ARG	COL	FRA	ITA	MEX	SPA	SWI	Certifications	Album
"Valió La Pena"	2008	—	—	26	—	—	—	—	—	—	—		Pedro Capó
"Vamos a Huir"	2009	—	—	—	—	—	—	—	—	—	—		Pedro Capó
"Estoy Enamorado" (with Thalía)	2009	—	28	6	—	—	—	—	11	—	—	AMPROFON: Platinum	Primera Fila
"Un Poquito Más"	2009	—	—	—	—	—	—	—	—	—	—		Pedro Capó
"Si Tú Me Lo Pides" (featuring Kany Garcia)	2010	—	—	22	—	—	—	—	—	—	—		Pedro Capó
"Un Minuto"	2011	—	32	10	—	—	—	—	—	—	—		Pedro Capó
"Duele Ser Infiel"	2012	—	46	18	—	—	—	—	—	—	—		Pedro Capó
"La Vida Va"	2012	—	—	34	—	—	—	—	—	—	—		Pedro Capó
"#FiebreDeAmor"	2013	—	43	31	—	—	—	—	—	—	—		Aquila
"Para Ayudarte a Reir"	2014	—	40	27	—	—	—	—	—	—	—		Aquila
"Vivo"	2015	—	—	38	—	—	—	—	—	—	—		Aquila
"Libre"	2015	—	—	33	—	—	—	—	—	—	—		Aquila
"Todo Me Recuerda a Ti"	2015	—	—	29	—	—	—	—	—	—	—		Aquila
"Azúcar Amargo"	2017	—	—	33	—	—	—	—	— (Note: "Azúcar Amargo" did not enter the Billboard Mexico Airplay chart, but peaked at number 23 on the Mexico Espanol Airplay chart.)	—	—		En Letra de Otro
"Las Luces"	2018	—	—	—	—	—	—	—	—	—	—		Munay
"Calma" (solo or remixes with Farruko and Alicia Keys)	2018	71	3	1	1	1	11	1	1	2	2	RIAA: 25× Platinum (Latin) (Remix); RIAA: 2× Platinum (Latin); AMPROFON: 3× Diamond+2× Platinum; FIMI: 4× Platinum; PROMUSICAE: 5× Platinum; SNEP: Diamond	Munay
"Te Olvidaré" (with MYA)	2019	—	—	—	30	—	—	—	— (Note: "Te Olvidaré" did not enter the Billboard Mexico Airplay chart, but peaked at number 47 on the Mexico Espanol Airplay chart.)	—	—		Hoy
"Como Lo Hiciste Ayer" (with ICON and Reykon)	2019	—	—	—	—	6	—	—	—	—	—		Non-album single
"Tutu" (with Camilo)	2019	—	16	2	1	4	—	97	1	8	—	RIAA: Diamond (Latin); AMPROFON: 2× Diamond+Platinum+Gold; PROMUSICAE: 2× Platinum	Por Primera Vez
"Quédate" (with Debi Nova)	2019	—	—	—	—	—	—	—	—	—	—		Non-album single
"Perdiendo la Cabeza" (with Carlos Rivera and Becky G)	2020	—	—	22	39	7	—	—	1	—	—	RIAA: Platinum (Latin); AMPROFON: 3× Platinum+Gold	Crónicas de Una Guerra
"Buena Suerte"	2020	—	—	25	—	—	—	—	—	—	—		Munay
"La Sabana Y Los Pies"	2020	—	—	—	75	—	—	—	—	—	—		Munay
"Tu Fanático (Remix)" (with Nicki Nicole and De La Ghetto)	2021	—	—	—	—	—	—	—	—	—	—		Munay
"La Fiesta"	2023	—	—	—	—	—	—	—	—	31	—	RIAA: Gold (Latin); AMPROFON: Gold; PROMUSICAE: Platinum	
"—" denotes a recording that did not chart or was not released in that territory.

=== As a featured artist ===
List of singles as a featured artist, with selected chart positions and certifications, showing year released and album name
Title	Year	Peak chart positions			Album
Title	Year	US	US Latin	SCO	Album
"El Aprendiz" (Samo featuring Pedro Capó)	2015	—	—	—	Me Quito El Sombrero (En Vivo desde Guanajuato)
"Volar" (Jenny Roca featuring Pedro Capó)	2015	—	—	—	Una Nueva Historia
"Grita al Cielo" (Gustavo Galindo featuring Pedro Capó)	2017	—	—	—	Renacer
"Almost Like Praying" (as part of Artists for Puerto Rico)	2017	20	3	88	Non-album singles
"Isla Bendita" (as part of Unidos por Puerto Rico)	2018	—	—	—	Non-album singles
"—" denotes a recording that did not chart or was not released in that territory.

=== Promotional singles ===
List of promotional singles showing year released
Title	Year	Album
"Navidad Sin Ti"	2012	Non-album single
"Prisionero" (Wisin featuring Pedro Capó and Axel)	2015	Los Vaqueros: La Trilogia

== Other charted songs ==
List of other charted songs with chart positions
Title	Year	Peaks	Album
Title	Year	SPA	Album
"Tutu (Remix)" (with Camilo and Shakira)	2019	98	TBA

== Other appearances ==
List of guest appearances showing year released and album name
Title	Year	Other performer(s)	Album
"Panteón de Amor"	2011	Victor Manuelle	Me Llamaré Tuyo Reloaded
"Agua Bendita" (Remix)	2015	Raquel Sofía, Orlando Vitto	Te Odio los Sábados and Te Quiero los Domingos
"Centro Song"	2015	Jesús Hidalgo	Jesus Hidalgo Duos
"Café con Abrazo"	2016	Santiago Cruz	Trenes, Aviones y Viajes Interplanetarios
"Patria"	2016	Obie Bermúdez	De Puerto Rico para el Mundo
"Tequila Pa'la Razón	2017	Luis Figueroa, Christian Pagán	Guerra de Ídolos
"El Incomprendido"	2017	Negroni's Trio	New Era
"Duele Amarte Así"	2017	Matisse	Por Tu Bien
"Suspendidos en el Tiempo"	2018	Alex Cuba	Non-album song
"La Última Copa"	2018	None	Más de Un Siglo
"Borinquen Bella"	2019	Farruko, Justin Quiles, Zion & Lennox	Gangalee
"Cae de Una"	2020	Ricky Martin	Pausa
