= Marcelo Peralta =

Argentine musician (1961–2020)

Marcelo Peralta (5 March 1961 – 10 March 2020) was an Argentine performer, teacher, composer, and arranger who played saxophone, piano, accordion, and the Latin American aerophones.

== Early life and education ==
Peralta was born in Buenos Aires. He studied piano and music theory at the Antiguo Conservatorio Beethoven, where he obtained a teaching certificate in 1979. At the age of 18, he began to play the baritone sax, showing a particular interest in the music of Serge Chaloff; inspired by John Coltrane, Albert Ayler and Ornette Coleman, he learned tenor sax, then alto and finally soprano. While studying harmony and composition under tango composer Sebastian Piana, he taught himself to play trumpet, trombone, tuba, violin, clarinet, and Latin American folk instruments.

Since that time he taught at several schools. In 1980 he taught music in both elementary and high schools, as welI as at special education institutions. At the same time, he was hired as a saxophone and improvisation instructor at the Conservatorio Municipal Manuel de Falla (Buenos Aires).

== Career ==
At 18, he began his career as a freelance musician and went on to play and record with a wide range of artists and in many styles: The Bucky Arcella Trio, Manolo Yanes, Litto Nebbia, Fabiana Cantilo, Cuatro Vientos (sax quartet), LRA National Radio Orchestra (as a soloist), to name a few.

In 1985 he met the guitar player Jorge Mancini, with whom he began to experiment in free improvisation and contemporary music; they were joined by the sax player Mariana Potenza and the percussionist Victor Da Cunha, together creating the Grupo de Improvisación Tercer Mundo (Third World improvisation Group). It was with this group that he recorded his first record as a soloist - Un Hilo de Luz (1987).

Although he had been playing the quena, the accordion and other ethnic and percussion instruments alongside the standard ones for several years, his interest in folk music was developed in 1988 when he performed and recorded with the pianist and composer Eduardo Lagos (an innovator in Argentine folklore).

He developed a personal view of improvised music when he formed his own quintet, with which he explored the roots of Latin American music. Together with musicians such as Cesar Franov, Enrique Norris, Carlos Triolo, Diego Pojomovsky, and Guillermo Bazzola, he made his second recording Escaleras de la Comprensión (Melopea Records- 1990/1991).

Over the next five years, he headed the big band Los Saxópatas (1990-1995) with which he recorded and performed throughout Argentina. In Buenos Aires, he recorded Milonga (Melopea Records- 1997) and made the debut of his solo set show in which he improvises freely on American folk tunes, interpreting bagualas, vidalas, bailecitos, and chacareras in his own unique style.

He lived in Spain, where he taught saxophone and improvisation at several music schools and performed both in:

- Festival de Jazz de Madrid, 2005-2007
- Tanjazz, 2007 (Tánger)
- Festival Internacional de Vigo Imagina-Sons, 2007
- Mostoles a todo Jazz, 2005-2006
- Munijazz (La Rioja)
- Festival de Jazz de Boadilla del Monte, 2005
- Festival Internaconal de Jazz de Ciudad Lineal, 2005
- Galapajazz 2005 – Expo 02 (Suiza)
- Festival de Jazz Soto del Real, 2003
- Festival de Jazz de Tarragona, 2003
- Festival de Jazz de Paris, 2001
- Festival de Jazz Quilmes, 199
- Alrededor del Jazz Festival, 1989
- MardelJazz, 1988
- Rock&piano- Obras Sanitarias, 1987

== Death ==
Peralta died from coronavirus disease 2019 during the COVID-19 pandemic in Madrid, Spain on 10 March 2020, at the age of 59.

== Discography ==
- Serie Melopea Jazz Argentino Vol. 1

Litto Nebbia Cuarteto - MELOPEA / INTERDISC (DSL 66094-1)

- Serie Melopea Jazz Argentino Vol. 2

Grupo de Improvisación Tercer Mundo - MELOPEA (CM 008)

- Tangueando

Gustavo Fedel - MELOPEA / INTERDISC (DSL 66071)

- Buscando en el Bolsillo del Alma

Litto Nebbia - MELOPEA / INTERDISC (SLI 67549-2)

- Un Hilo de Luz

Marcelo Peralta y Grupo Tercer Mundo - MELOPEA (DM 014)

- Serie Melopea Los Saxofonistas

Marcelo Peralta - MELOPEA (CM 017)

- Escaleras de la Comprensión

Marcelo Peralta - MELOPEA (CM 064)

- Homenaje a Tom Jobim

Marcelo Peralta - Litto Nebbia MELOPEA

- Milonga

Marcelo Peralta - MELOPEA (CDM 014) - NUEVOS MEDIOS IMPORT

- Lo que nos gusta es esto

Santiago de la Muela – SATCHMO

- Fall

Peter Dieterle - David Lenker - Marcelo Peralta

- DixFunxional Brass Band

Tony Heimer – Bob Sands – Chris Kase – Ove Larson – Greg Moore –
Steve Jordan – Marcelo Peralta – MOCO DE PAVO PRODUCCIONS

- Música – Yumiko Murakami

(Jerry González – Diego Urcola – Gustavo Gregorio – Christian Howes, etc.)
PAI – 3068

- Dr. Macaroni – Cum Laude

TCB- The Montreaux Jazz Label

- Jazz Sinfónico – Orquesta Sinfonica de RTVE

(Solistas: Chris Kase, Bobby Martínez, Roberto Cimadevilla, Marcelo Peralta etc)
