= List of Billboard Regional Mexican Airplay number-one songs of 2020 =

The Billboard Regional Mexican Songs chart ranks the best-performing Regional Mexican singles in the United States. Published weekly by Billboard magazine, it ranks the "most popular regional Mexican songs, ranked by radio airplay audience impressions as measured by Nielsen Music."

== Chart history ==
Key
†	Indicates best-performing song of 2020

Issue date	Song	Artist(s)	Ref.
January 4	"Escondidos" †	La Addictiva Banda San Jose de Mesillas	
January 11	"Caballero"	Alejandro Fernández	
January 18	"Escondidos" †	La Addictiva Banda San Jose de Mesillas	
January 25	"Esa Vez Soy Yo"	Banda Carnaval	
February 1	"Esa Vez Soy Yo"	Banda Carnaval	
February 8	"Esa Vez Soy Yo"	Banda Carnaval	
February 15	"No Elegi Conocerte"	Banda Sinaloense MS de Sergio Lizarraga	
February 22	"Esa Vez Soy Yo"	Banda Carnaval	
February 29	"Solo Tu"	Calibre 50	
March 7	"Solo Tu"	Calibre 50	
March 14	"Solo Tu"	Calibre 50	
March 21	"Solo Tu"	Calibre 50	
March 28	"Solo Tu"	Calibre 50	
April 4	"Dormida"	Edwin Luna y La Trakalosa de Monterrey	
April 11	"Dormida"	Edwin Luna y La Trakalosa de Monterrey	
April 18	"Dormida"	Edwin Luna y La Trakalosa de Monterrey	
April 25	"Te Olvide"	Alejandro Fernández	
May 2	"Te Olvide"	Alejandro Fernández	
May 9	"Se Me Olvido"	Christian Nodal	
May 16	"Se Me Olvido"	Christian Nodal	
May 23	"Se Me Olvido"	Christian Nodal	
May 30	"Se Me Olvido"	Christian Nodal	
June 6	"Yo Ya No Vuelvo Contigo"	Lenin Ramirez Featuring Grupo Firme	
June 13	"Se Me Olvido"	Christian Nodal	
June 20	"Se Me Olvido"	Christian Nodal	
June 27	"Otra Borrachera"	Gerardo Ortíz	
July 4	"En Eso No Quedamos"	Banda Los Sebastianes de Mazatlan, Sinaloa	
July 11	"Otra Borrachera"	Gerardo Ortíz	
July 18	"En Eso No Quedamos"	Banda Los Sebastianes de Mazatlan, Sinaloa	
July 25	"Barquillero"	Calibre 50	
August 1	"Barquillero"	Calibre 50	
August 8	"Barquillero"	Calibre 50	
August 15	"Barquillero"	Calibre 50	
August 22	"Me Hubieras Avisado"	Edwin Luna y La Trakalosa de Monterrey	
August 29	"Me Hubieras Avisado"	Edwin Luna y La Trakalosa de Monterrey	
September 5	"El Envidioso"	Los Dos Carnales	
September 12	"Aquí Abajo"	Christian Nodal	
September 19	"Aquí Abajo"	Christian Nodal	
September 26	"Somos Los Que Somos"	Los 2 de La S & Banda MS de Sergio Lizarraga	
October 3	"Aquí Abajo"	Christian Nodal	
October 10	"Aquí Abajo"	Christian Nodal	
October 17	"Lo Que Nunca Sera"	La Addictiva Banda San Jose de Mesillas	
October 24	"Decepciones"	Alejandro Fernández & Calibre 50	
October 31	"Lo Que Nunca Sera"	La Addictiva Banda San Jose de Mesillas	
November 7	"Lo Que Nunca Sera"	La Addictiva Banda San Jose de Mesillas	
November 14	"Lo Que Nunca Sera"	La Addictiva Banda San Jose de Mesillas	
November 21	"Lo Que Nunca Sera"	La Addictiva Banda San Jose de Mesillas	
November 28	"Lo Que Nunca Sera"	La Addictiva Banda San Jose de Mesillas	
December 5	"Cerrando Ciclos"	Banda MS de Sergio Lizarraga	
December 12	"Cerrando Ciclos"	Banda MS de Sergio Lizarraga	
December 19	"Te Volveria A Elegir"	Calibre 50	
December 26	"Te Volveria A Elegir"	Calibre 50	
