= Riachão (singer) =

Brazilian composer (1921–2020)

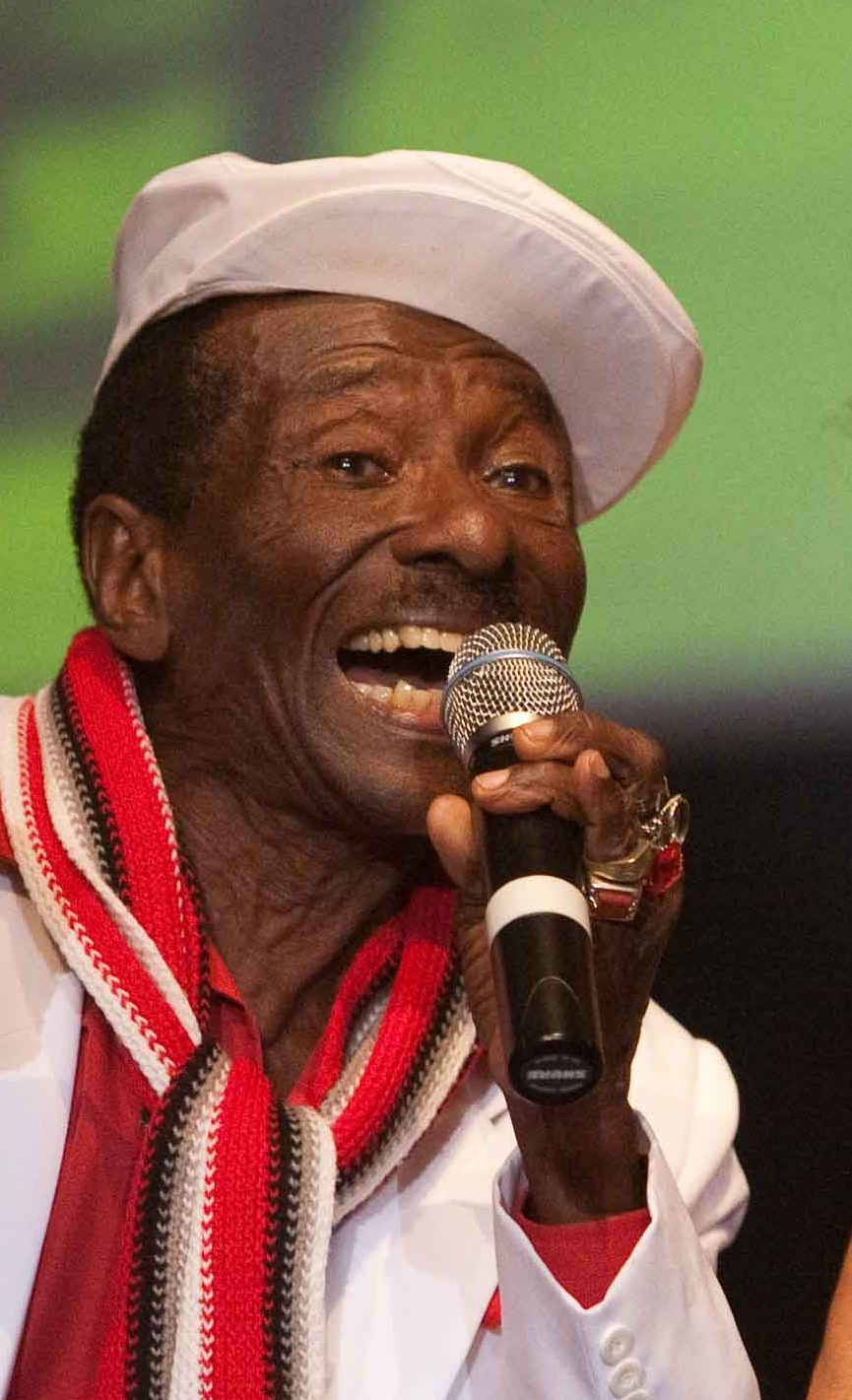
Riachão

Clementino Rodrigues (14 November 1921 – 30 March 2020) was a Brazilian samba composer and singer.

== Discography ==
- Mundão de Ouro, Selo Comando S Discos, CD (2013)
- Riachão, Selo Caravelas, CD (2001)
- Humanenochum, Selo Caravelas, CD (2000)
- Samba da Bahia, Selo Fontana, LP (1975)
- Sonho de Malandro, Selo Desenbanco, LP (1973)
- Umbigada da Baleia, 78 (por volta da década de 1960)
