= Iñaxi Etxabe =

Spanish bertsolari singer (1933–2020)

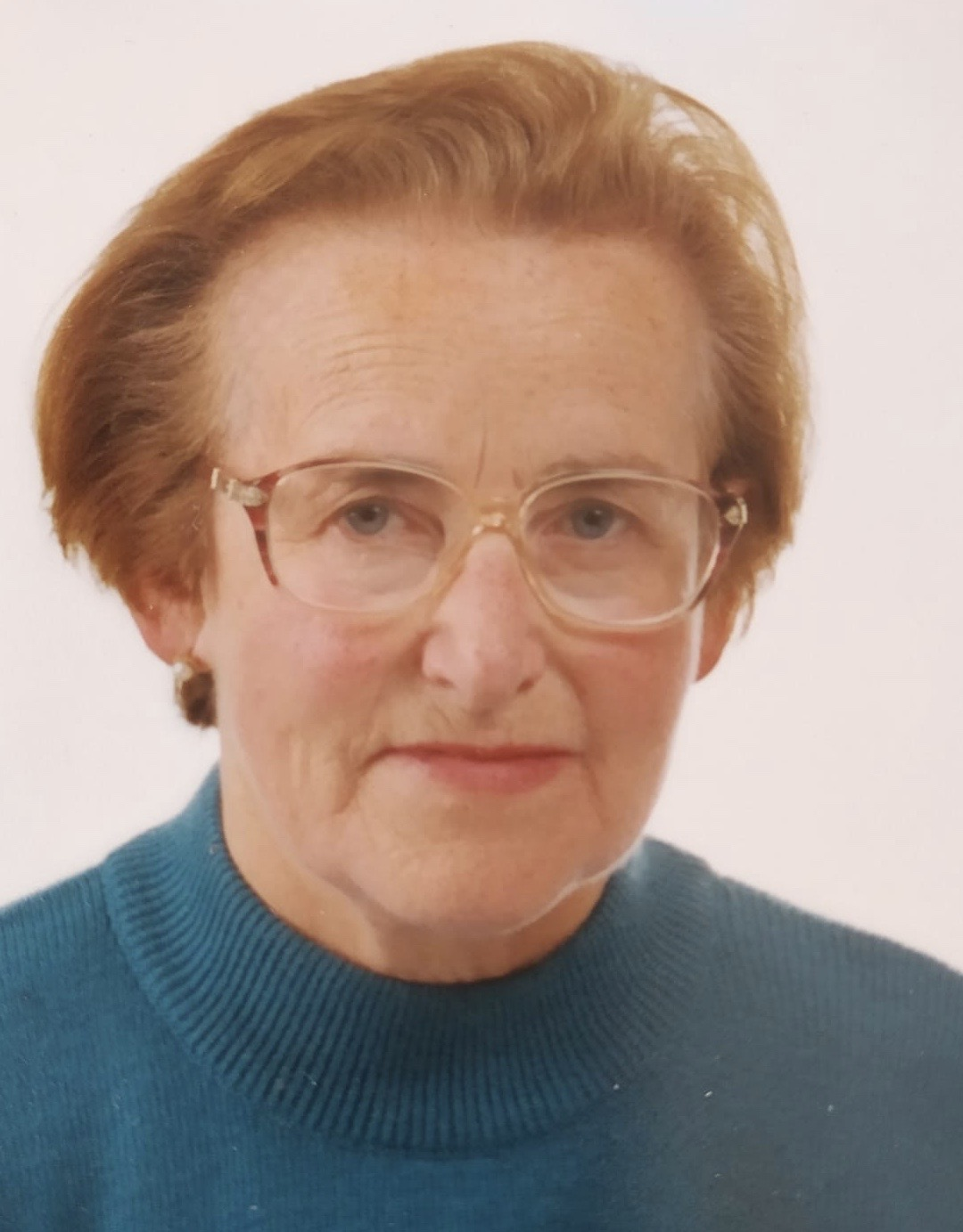
- Born: 26 March 1933; Oikia, Zumaia
- Died: 11 July 2020 (aged 87)
- Occupation: Bertsolari

Iñaxi Etxabe (26 March 1933 – 11 July 2020) was a Spanish bertsolari singer.

Etxabe was born in Oikia, Zumaia in 1933 and first acted as a bertsolari in a public role in 1956. A major focus of their music was on defending women.

Etxabe died on 11 July 2020, aged 87.
