= Charlie Monttana =

Mexican musician (1961–2020)

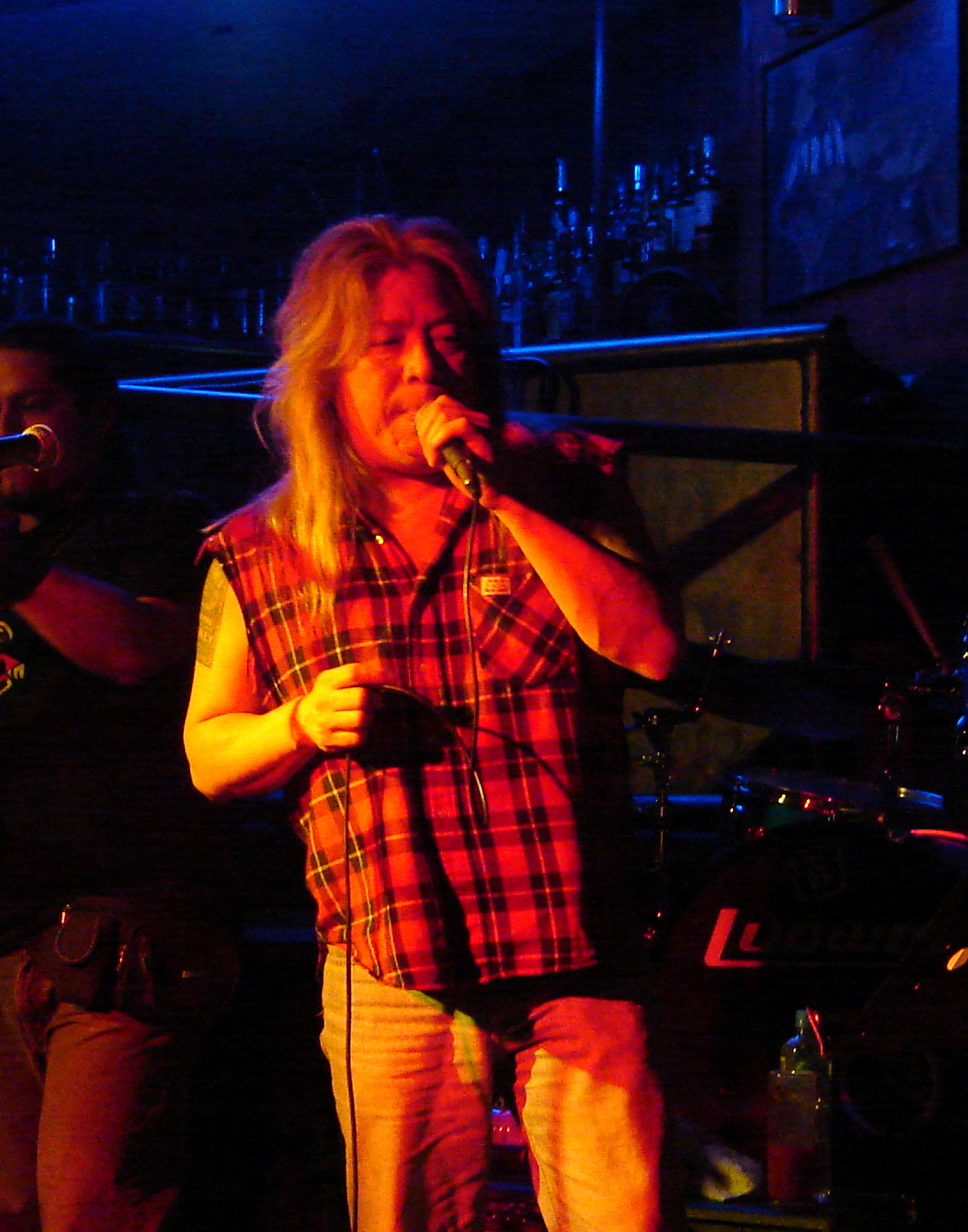

Background information
- Birth name: Carlos César Sánchez Hernández
- Born: 6 November 1961; Colonia Guerrero, Mexico City, Mexico
- Died: 28 May 2020 (aged 58); Mexico City, Mexico
- Genres: Rock urbano, Rock music in Mexico
- Occupation(s): Musician and songwriter
- Instrument(s): Voice, guitar
- Years active: 1984-2020
- Labels: Discos y Cintas Denver

Carlos César Sánchez Hernández (November 6, 1961 – May 28, 2020), known professionally as Charlie Monttana, was a Mexican rock urbano musician and songwriter.

== Life ==
Sánchez began his career as a singer in Mexico City's rock urbano circuit in the earlier 80's being vocalist of Perro muerto. After that invited by Rodolfo León "León Vago" he joined Vago. In 1987 he was invited by musician Toshiro Midori to be the vocalist of Mara. In 1989 he separated from Mara due to disagreements with the members of the group and Charlie joined again Vago, releasing with them in 1992 the song "Tu Mamá No Me Quiere" ("Your Mom does not like me"), which became a hit on the rock urbano and sonidero circuits.

In 1992 Monttana launched his solo career releasing hits such as "Vaquero Rocanrolero" (Rock And Roll Cowboy), "Por Qué El Amor Apesta" ("Why Love Stinks") and "Mi Terrible Soledad" ("My Terrible Loneliness"), among others. In addition to his career since 2012 the musician devoted his time to philanthropic works with Fundación Charlie Monttana A.C., a civil association dedicated to support homeless children and elderly.

Monttana died from a stroke derived from glucose affections on May 28, 2020 at the age of 58.

== Style ==
His style was characterized by being a histrionic and light-hearted vocalist on stage and by keeping an aesthetic associated with 80s glam rock of outrageous clothes and hairstyles, leather clothing and Jack Daniel's brand t-shirts and objects. He took his stage name from the 1983 film Scarface. In addition to the stage name, Monttana adopted the nickname of "Mexico's sweetheart" as a parody of Angélica María and "Vaquero Rocanrolero" in reference to one of his most famous songs.

== Discography ==
=== With Mara ===
- "Alocame con tus piernas"(1994)
- Ficheras del rock (1987)
- ...Esperando la noche (1988)
- Camaleón (1989)
- ¡En vivo! En el reclusorio femenil (1990)

=== With Vago ===
- Suicida (1992)

=== Solo ===
- Pares y duetos (1996)
- Todos estos años (1998)
- Sé lo que hicieron el disco pasado (1999)
- En vivo en el teatro Isabela Corona vol. 1 y 2 (1999)
- Montta Morfosis
- Rockin' and rollin'
- Rock star
- Ford Monttana 69
- Dr. Hollywood
- 15 grandes éxitos
- Sobreviviente 33
- Decreto por el regreso de los buenos tiempos

=== Filmography ===
- Loco fin de semana, a comedy film directed by Kristoff Raczyñski (2019).
- Soy Yo, Charlie Monttana, a bio documentary film by Ernesto Méndez (2020).
