= Resorte =

Mexican nu metal band

- Origin: Ciudad Satélite, State of Mexico, Mexico
- Genres: Nu metal, rap metal
- Years active: 1995–present
- Labels: Universal Music; Sony Music
- Members: Juan Chávez Johnny; Gabriel Queso Bronfman; Andrei Pulver; Ulises Sánchez Chopper; Omar Avley Toro; Oscar Soto
- Past members: Gustavo Tavo Limongi (deceased); Raúl Iván Arteaga Set-set; Patricio Elizalde Pato Machete; Enrique Camacho Chango; José Manuel González Tetes; Héctor González Tore; Gerardo López Topo; Carlos Sánchez Charal; José Macario
- Website: https://resorte-oficial.com

Resorte is a Mexican nu metal and rap metal band formed in 1995 in Ciudad Satélite, State of Mexico.

== History ==
Tavo, Juan Chávez and Carlos Sánchez formed the group in 1995. The birth of the band coincided with the emergence of nu metal, a genre that bands such as Deftones and Korn had already popularized in the United States. That same year, Resorte independently produced the music video for “América”, a song that would later become one of the band’s most representative tracks. The video reached MTV, helping the group gain national recognition.

After several live performances, Resorte released its debut album, República de Ciegos, in June 1997. That same year also marked the rise of new acts within the Mexican rock scene, including Molotov, who also released their debut album.

The band participated in numerous festivals and large-scale concerts. In September 1999, Resorte released its second album, XL, which further boosted the band's popularity and earned them exposure on radio and television, in addition to reaching MTV Latinoamérica’s Top 10. During this period, Resorte opened shows for international acts such as Limp Bizkit, Papa Roach and Red Hot Chili Peppers.

In 2001, the band contributed the song “Poom” to the soundtrack of the film Atlético San Pancho. The soundtrack also featured songs by bands such as Molotov, La Gusana Ciega, Lost Acapulco and Moderatto, among others. The track was later included on the EP Versión 3.0.

At the end of 2002, Tavo participated in the self-titled debut album by Cartel de Santa on the song “Chinga a los racistas”.

In May 2006, Resorte performed at the Vive Latino festival and later that year at Corona Music Fest.

In 2009, the band performed at Foro Sol as an opening act for Metallica.

Beginning in 2010, Resorte continued performing concerts across several states in Mexico.

In 2012, the band performed during Semana Santa celebrations at Playa Miramar in Tampico Madero alongside Genitallica. They also participated in events in Hermosillo, Guanajuato and San Luis Potosí, sharing the stage with acts such as Cartel de Santa, La Lupita, Los Concorde and Boxer. In addition, the band performed at the Cliché Concert festival alongside La Gusana Ciega, Austin TV, Bengala and Vicente Gayo.

On September 1, 2014, the band released the single “Re-conecta2” through digital platforms.

In 2017, for reasons not publicly disclosed, founding member Gustavo “Tavo” Limongi left the band and began his solo project titled T.R.E.S. Shortly afterward, Resorte recruited José Manuel González “Tetes” and Héctor González “Tore”, formerly of Here Comes the Kraken, as temporary musicians. One year later, Ulises Sánchez “Chopper” officially joined on guitar and Andrei Pulver joined as vocalist.

In 2018, the band contributed the song “Rayas y mil batallas” to the soundtrack of the documentary film Chivas: La Película, based on the Mexican football club Club Deportivo Guadalajara. The track became available on Spotify.

In 2019, the band announced the release of República Zombie, their fourth studio album and the first in 17 years.

On May 1, 2020, Gustavo “Tavo” Limongi, founder and former guitarist of the band, died at the age of 52 due to a heart attack in his sleep.

Later that year, on June 5, 2020, the band released as a tribute a live DVD recorded on January 28, 2017, at the now-defunct Caradura venue in Mexico City through their Facebook page.

During recent concerts, the band has performed unreleased songs from its upcoming material, including “Zombie” and “Vienen por ti”.

In 2022, José Macario joined the band as an official member and producer. During that period, the band completed the production and recording of the album República Zombie.

In 2023, Carlos Sánchez “Charal” left the band for reasons not publicly disclosed. Shortly afterward, Omar Avley “Toro” joined the group as its new drummer.

In 2024, República Zombie was officially released, followed by a tour across multiple cities in Mexico. That same year, Resorte performed at the Aftershock Festival in Sacramento, California, becoming one of the first Spanish-speaking Mexican bands to appear on the festival’s lineup.

The band also collaborated on music related to the video game Free Fire with the song “Bajo fuego” alongside Hispana. Later, they collaborated with Ladrones on the track “¿Quién se robó?”.

In 2025, Resorte celebrated its 30th anniversary with a special three-show tour in Monterrey, Guadalajara and Mexico City, performing at venues such as Café Iguana, C3 Stage and Lunario del Auditorio Nacional.

Following the anniversary tour, the band released the EP Mi Beat sonando como King Kong, a record that showcased a more experimental sound with stronger metalcore influences, incorporating breakdowns, tempo changes, unconventional song structures, heavier guttural vocals and melodic choruses.

In 2026, for reasons not publicly disclosed, José Macario left the band and was replaced by Oscar Soto.

The band is currently working on a new studio album whose title has not yet been officially announced.

== Members ==
=== Current members ===
- Andrei Pulver – vocals (2018–present)
- Juan Chávez – vocals, bass (1996–present)
- Gabriel Queso Bronfman – backing vocals, bass (1999–2001, 2007–present)
- Ulises Sánchez Chopper – guitar (2018–present)
- Omar Avley Toro – drums (2023–present)
- Oscar Soto – guitar (2026–present)

=== Former members ===
- Gerardo López Topo – drums (1996)
- Carlos Sánchez Charal – drums (1995–1999, 2007–2023)
- Gustavo Tavo Limongi – vocals, guitar (1996–2020, deceased)
- Raúl Iván Arteaga Negrón Set-set – bass (1997)
- Patricio Elizalde Pato Machete – vocals (2002–2006)
- Enrique Camacho Chango – drums (2001–2006)
- José Manuel González Tetes – vocals (2017)
- Héctor González Tore – guitar (2017)
- José Macario – guitar (2022–2026)

== Discography ==
=== Studio albums ===
- República de Ciegos (1997)
- XL (1999)
- Rebota (F = KX) (2002)
- República Zombie (2024)

=== EPs ===
- Versión 3.0 (2000)
- Mi Beat sonando como King Kong (2025)

=== Singles ===
- América (1997)
- Opina o Muere (1997)
- La Mitad + Uno (1997)
- Caliente (1999)
- Puro Rock (1999)
- Aquí no es donde (2000)
- Alcohol (2002)
- Brota (2002)
- Re-conecta2 (2014)
- Zombie (2022)
- Matambre (2022)
- Bajo Fuego (2022)
- Modo Bestia (2022)
- Todos de Pie (2023)
- ¿Quién se robó? (2023)
- Si hoy me voy (2023)
- No nos detienen (2025)

=== Other appearances ===
- Qué te pasa? ¿Estás borracho?: Tributo a Hombres G – “Esta es tu vida”
