= Pedro Jóia =

Portuguese guitarist, composer, and musical director

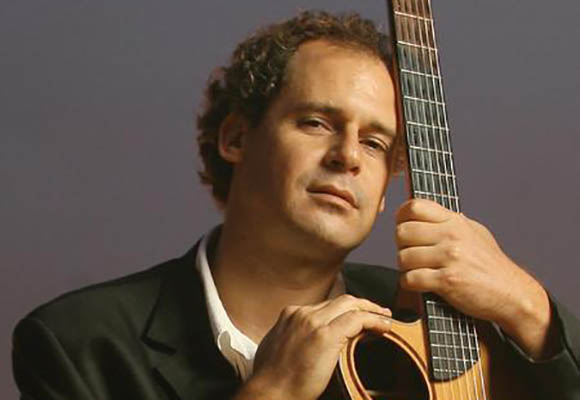
Pedro Jóia

Pedro Jóia (born 30 May 1970 in Liège, Belgium) is a Portuguese guitarist, composer, and musical director. He is considered one of the Portuguese top players of Classical guitar .

Pedro started playing guitar at seven years of age. At fourteen he entered in the Conservatório Nacional de Música and two years later began to study flamenco guitar with Paco Peña, Gerardo Núñez and Manolo Sanlúcar. During this time Pedro started playing professionally – starting at 19 years old – both solo and also with different formations in Europe, Asia, South America and Africa.

Pedro has regularly composed for theatre, cinema and has released six CDs under his own name. Between 1997 and 2003 he taught at the Universidade de Évora. For the following five years he lived in Brazil and played regularly with Ney Matogrosso, Yamandú Costa and Gilberto Gil among many others.

In 2008 he received the Prémio Carlos Paredes award for his album 'À Espera de Armandinho'. In 2011 he started a close collaboration with some of the most promising names of novo fado such as with Raquel Tavares and Ricardo Ribeiro, exploring new musical approaches to traditional fado music.

Since 2012 Pedro has been the touring musical director with the iconic fado singer Mariza, playing with Resistência, combining these activities with his own personal projects such as the Pedro Jóia Trio.

== Discography ==
- Guadiano - 1996
- Sueste - 1999
- Variações Sobre Carlos Paredes - 2001
- Jacarandá - 2003
- À Espera de Armandinho - 2007
- Pedro Jóia Ao Vivo com Orquestra de Câmara Meridional - 2015
