= Amanda Magalhães =

Brazilian singer-songwriter and actress

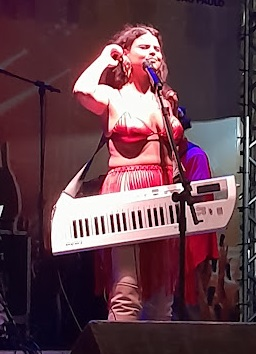
- Magalhães live in São Paulo at the 2023 Virada Cultural
- Pronunciation: IPA: [ɐˈmɐ̃dɐ maɡaˈʎɐ̃js]
- Born: 9 September 1991 (age 35); Rio de Janeiro, Rio de Janeiro
- Education: University of São Paulo
- Occupations: Singer-songwriter, pianist, producer, actress
- Years active: 2017–present
- Father: William Magalhães
- Relatives: Oberdan Magalhães (grandfather)

Amanda Magalhães (/ˌmɑːɡəˈljaɪnz/ MAH-ghə-LYEYENZ; Portuguese: [ɐˈmɐ̃dɐ maɡaˈʎɐ̃js]; born 9 September 1991) is a Brazilian actress, singer-songwriter, pianist and producer, known for the role of Natália on the Netflix series 3%. In 2020, she released her debut album, Fragma.

== Childhood and personal life ==
Magalhães is the daughter and granddaughter of notorious musicians (respectively, William and Oberdan Magalhães). Her mother was a backing vocalist for Baby Consuelo. Many other of her relatives were musicians, but except for her great-grandmother Yolanda, who played the acoustic guitar, women would mostly only sing, which made her feel she would follow the same path. At the age of nine, she discovered Alicia Keys, Norah Jones and Nina Simone, all women who sing and play, and realized she would draw inspiration from them. Her father supported her and she began to study. At 15, she earned her first piano. Her parents divorced when she was six and, some years later, her father moved to São Paulo, where he would play live more often, and he eventually convinced her to move in.

Magalhães spent half her life in São Paulo, where she studied at the University of São Paulo Drama Arts School (EAD-USP).

== Music career ==
=== Beginnings and musical instruction ===
Magalhães considered being a composer, but not necessarily a singer. She liked soundtrack composers such as Alexandre Desplat and tried to compose songs inspired by such music. In her teenage years, she would listen to a lot of classic rock, including Jimi Hendrix. Later, she turned to her father's black music.

Later in life, she shifted focus and entered USP to study drama arts. The director of a play she was cast in, (Na) Solidão nos Tempos de Algodão ((In the) Solitude in the Cotton Times) wanted her to sing "Solitude", by Billie Holiday. After receiving positive feedback on her performance, she decided to invest on a musical path, as well. She spent the next years buying equipment and learning musical production to record her own compositions.

=== First singles and Fragma ===
Starting in 2018, Magalhães started to prepare her first album. Until 2020, she released three singles. The first was "Fazer Valer" (To Make It Count), featuring rapper Rincon Sapiência, a trap song created on the piano and released on 14 December on Rolling Stone Brasil's website and with lyrics inspired by Buddhism. After this song, she also released "Vai Ouvir" (Gonna Listen) and "Coração Só" (Lonely Heart). "Vai Ouvir", from 21 February 2019, was created after the end of a relationship and is influenced by gypsy jazz, which she listened to a lot during a trip to France to work on a play, besides elements of Latin music, Bollywood, pop, walking bass and references to Chico Buarque's play Gota d'Água (Water Drop). "Coração Só" was released on 4 July 2019, influenced by folk pop.

As she released the fourth one, "Saiba" (Know It), on 4 November 2019, featuring Seu Jorge, she announced the three previous ones wouldn't be part of the album, titled Fragma. In July 2020, she released a single named "Na Sua Casa" (In Your House), released with a stop motion video recorded via an app.

=== Influences ===
Besides Alicia Keys, Norah Jones, Nina Simone and her own father, Magalhães also cites Daft Punk, FKJ, Hiatus Kaiyote, Solange Knowles, Ray Charles, Zaz, Flume, BaianaSystem, Céu, Rita Lee, Liniker, Jorge Aragão, Mozart, Alcione, Erykah Badu, Madonna, Elis Regina, Björk, Amy Winehouse, A Tribe Called Quest, Childish Gambino, Rosalía, Jorja Smith, Letrux, Caldeirão, Quincy Jones and others as influences.

== Acting career ==
Magalhães appeared in the Netflix Brazilian series 3% in the role of Natália, in the series Psi, by HBO Brasil, and in the movie Querida Mamãe.

== Discography ==
Albums

- Fragma (2020)

Singles

- "Fazer Valer" (2018, featuring Rincon Sapiência)
- "Vai Ouvir" (2019)
- "Coração Só" (2019)
- "Saiba" (2019, featuring Seu Jorge)
- "O Amor Te Dá" (2020)
- "Na Sua Casa" (2020)

== Filmography ==
=== Television ===
Year	Title	Role	Note
?	Psi	?	
2018–2020	3%	Natália	Seasons 2—4

=== Cinema ===
Year	Title	Role	Note
2017	Querida Mamãe	?	

=== Theater ===
Year	Title	Role
?	(Na) Solidão Nos Tempos de Algodão	
