= Fragma (album) =

Studio album by Amanda Magalhães
- Released: 16 September 2020
- Genre: Black music, samba, MPB, soul, funk, R&B
- Length: 30:45
- Language: Portuguese
- Label: Boia Fria Produções / Warner Music Group
- Producer: Amanda Magalhães

Singles from Fragma
- 1. "Saiba" Released: 4 November 2019; 2. "O Amor Te Dá" Released: 18 May 2020; 3. "Talismã" Released: 16 September 2020

Fragma is the debut album by Brazilian singer and pianist Amanda Magalhães, released on 16 September 2020. With Fragma, Magalhães says she intended to "unite [...] the tropical swing of Brazilian rhythms and the American black music feel". The album was entirely written and produced by her and she defined it as "an album that talks about affection and brings the stages of my affectionate life, filled with black music, samba and MPB".

Fragma was announced in 2018 for a May 2019 release. In May 2020, it was announced that it would be released in June of that year. On the same month, the release date was postponed to July. It was finally released on 16 September via Boia Fria Produções and distributed by Ditto Music.

== Singles ==
The first single to be released was "Saiba", on 4 November 2019, featuring Seu Jorge on co-lead vocals, Vico Piovani on the acoustic guitar, Rodrigo Tavares on organ and clavinet and Tuto Ferraz on drums and percussion. Magalhães herself sings and plays the Rhodes piano. The single received a video on 20 of the following month, in which both singers sing and act.

Em 18 May 2020, she released another single, "O Amor Te Dá" (Love Gives You), also featuring Vico (acoustic guitar, bass, programming and arrangement) and Tuto (drums and percussion) and the addition of Leo Mendes on the acoustic guitar.

The third single, "Talismã", features Liniker and was released with a video on the same day of the album.

== Track listing ==
All tracks are written by Amanda Magalhães.

No.	Title	Length
1.	"A Direção" (The Direction)	1:29
2.	"Talismã" (Talisman; featuring Liniker)	4:43
3.	"Deixa Assim Por Ora" (Leave It Like This For Now)	3:41
4.	"Deixar Levar" (To Let It Take)	3:41
5.	"Saiba" (Know It; featuring Seu Jorge)	2:43
6.	"Ninguém Vê" (Nobody Sees)	4:05
7.	"Quando a Chuva Acaba" (When the Rain Is Over)	2:58
8.	"O Amor Te Dá" (Love Gives You)	4:07
9.	"Esperando a Lua" (Waiting for the Moon)	3:23
Total length:		30:45

== Personnel ==
Adapted from several sources.

- Amanda Magalhães — lead vocals and piano on all tracks
- Liniker — lead vocals on "Talismã"
- Seu Jorge — lead vocals on "Saiba"
- Vico Piovani — acoustic guitar and/or bass on all tracks except "Deixa Assim Por Ora"
- Leo Mendes — acoustic guitar on "O Amor Te Dá"
- Rodrigo Tavares — organ and clavinet on "Saiba"
- Tuto Ferraz — drums and percussion on all tracks except 1, 7 and 9
- Todinei — on "Deixar Levar"
- Sthe Araujo — on "Quando a Chuva Acaba"
