= Bely Basarte =

Spanish singer-songwriter (born 1991)

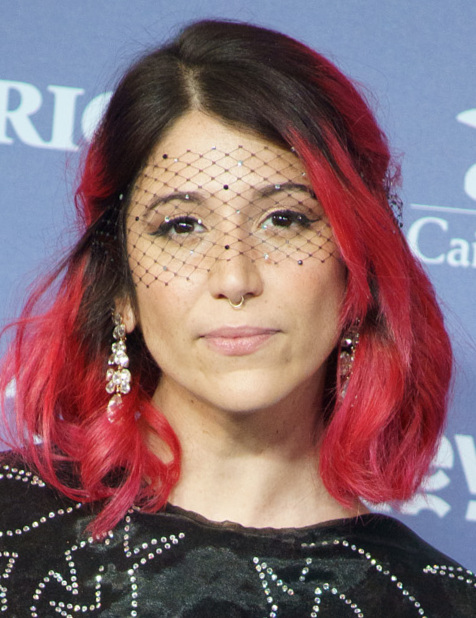
- Born: Belén Basarte Mena; 14 December 1991 (age 34); Madrid, Spain
- Education: Degree in Business Administration and Management
- Occupations: Singer songwriter
- Years active: 2015–present
- Musical career
- Genres: Indie pop; Pop; Alternative
- Instruments: Vocals, guitar, piano

Belén Basarte Mena (born 14 December 1991), known professionally as Bely Basarte, is a Spanish singer and songwriter. She began her career uploading covers and original songs to YouTube, where she gained popularity for her acoustic style and emotional lyrics.

In 2017 she was chosen by Disney to perform the Spanish-language singing voice of Belle in the live-action remake of Beauty and the Beast. She has since released several albums with Universal Music Group and has become one of Spain's most recognized independent pop artists.

== Early life and education ==
Basarte was born in Madrid and grew up in Alcobendas and later Tres Cantos. She studied musical theatre at King's College and performed at the Edinburgh Fringe Festival in 2006. She later earned a degree in Business Administration from the Autonomous University of Madrid in 2013.

== Career ==
In 2015 Basarte released her first EP Si quieres, pierdes and the single "Diciembre y no estás". Her debut studio album, Desde mi otro cuarto (2018), debuted at No. 3 in Spain's official sales chart.

Her second album, "El camino que no me llevó a Roma," was released in 2020 and also reached No. 3 on the Promusicae chart.

In 2021 she released the EP Psicotropical, which includes the single "Tomando Tequila" and a collaboration with Miki Núñez.

Her 2022 EP, "Nostalgia," was accompanied by a 30-minute short film that explored themes of personal growth.

== Discography ==
=== Studio albums ===
Year	Title	Label	Peak chart position (Spain)
2018	Desde mi otro cuarto	Universal Music	No. 3
2020	El camino que no me llevó a Roma	Universal Music	No. 3
2023	Bomba de humo	—	—

=== Extended plays ===
Year	Title	Label
2015	Si quieres, pierdes	AllSeeingEye Records
2021	Psicotropical	Universal Music
2022	Nostalgia	Independent

=== Notable singles ===
- "Diciembre y no estás" (2015)
- "No te quiero ver llorar" (2018)
- "Roma" (2020)
- "Tomando Tequila" (2021)

== Film and voice work ==
- Belle's singing voice in the Spanish-language version of Beauty and the Beast (2017)
