= Andrés Suárez =

Spanish singer-songwriter

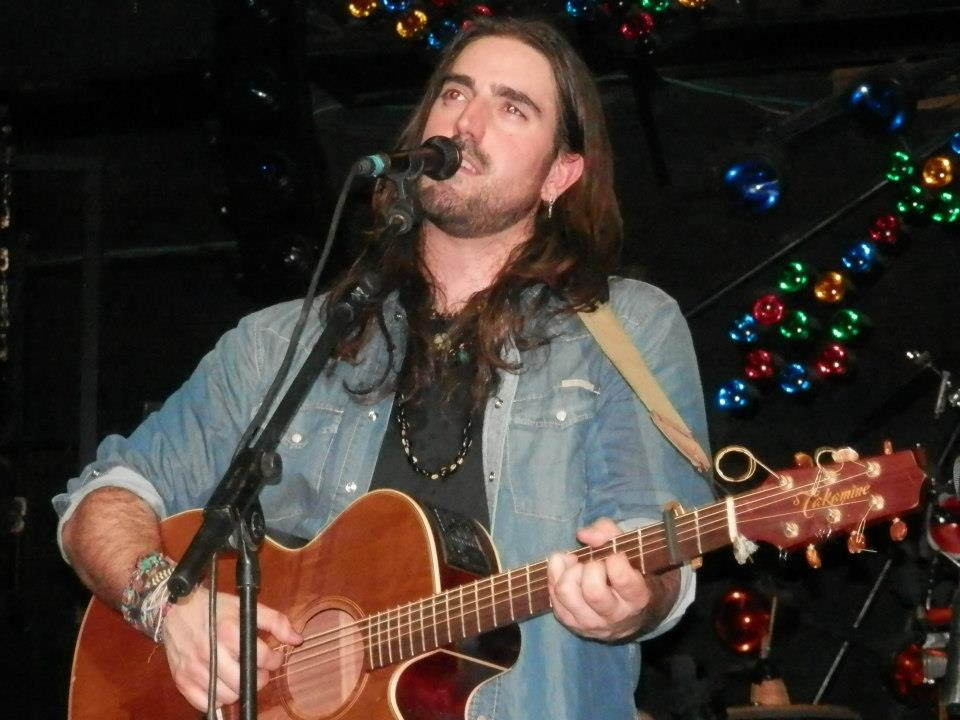
- Andrés Suárez in Madrid in 2013

Background information
- Born: 16 April 1983 (age 43); Pantín, Ferrol, Galicia, Spain
- Genres: Ballad, jazz
- Occupations: Musician, singer-songwriter
- Instruments: Vocals, guitar, piano
- Years active: 2002–present
- Labels: LIAM Producciones, S.L, EMI Music Spain S.L
- Website: http://andressuarez.es/

Andrés Suárez (Ferrol, 16 April 1983) is a Spanish singer-songwriter.

== Biography ==
At 14 years of age, Suárez started his first band in his hometown, Ferrol (Galicia, Spain). Since then, he was involved in many different pop and rock bands until he moved to Santiago de Compostela. There he became a singer-songwriter, he performed at local establishments in the historic city center, and recorded his first album, De ida, selling almost three thousand copies which brought him on tour throughout Spain.

In 2006, he won the Certamen de Jóvenes Cantautores Burgos, the first place for best lyrics at the contest Cantautores Elche and, also for best lyrics at the Certamen Descubre la Región de Murcia de Madrid. Furthermore, he won second place at the Certamen Marcilla Trovadora de Navarra, and the third prize at the Certamen Alameda de Málaga.

He left to live in the capital of Spain and of the Comunidad de Madrid, Madrid, that same year and, in the Café Libertad 8, he met Tontxu, famous Spanish singer-songwriter, who decided to début as a music producer with Andrés's new album, Maneras de romper una ola, which takes him a few years. It was finally released in 2008. With this work, he was able to sell, without barely any promotion, nearly five thousand copies, as well as visit a large part of concert halls throughout Spain giving concerts and recitals. He had the opportunity to give a concert in Cuba together with the pop rock duo, Buena Fe, as well as composed a song called "Volar sin ti" together with the vocalist of this duo (Israel Rojas).

On 4 October 2011 he began promotion for his third album, Cuando vuelva la marea, whose first single is titled Lo malo está en el aire.

On Sunday, 30 September 2012 he announced that he would be living the stage for some time but will perform in concerts until the end of that year, beginning his hiatus in January 2013.

He collaborates with the Cuban duo Buena Fe in the song "Volar sin ti" in his album, Dial (2013).

On 16 April 2013, he released his new album, called Moraima which makes reference to the name of a woman, which Suárez affirms that "Music is a woman".

In 2018 he composes songs with Luis Cepeda.

== Influences ==
Andrés Suárez has confessed on a number of occasions his admiration toward artists Damien Rice and Glen Hansard which he exclaimed: "He's God! I discovered his story by coincidence; a musician that played on the street, that left everything for music and today has an Oscar". He likes to say that he has an "handcrafted" way of conceiving the profession. And he considers himself a mix of the sea ("the window of my childhood", he says) and of music, "without tangible boundaries between the two".

== Discography ==
=== Albums ===
- De ida (2002)
- Maneras de romper una ola (2008; produced by Tontxu)
- Cuando vuelva la marea (2011)
- Moraima (2013)
- Mi pequeña historia (2015)
- Desde una ventana (2017)
- Andrés Suárez (2020)
- Viaje de vida y vuelta (2023)

=== Extended plays ===
- Piedras y charcos (2010)
