= La Voz (American TV series) season 2 =

La Voz
- Season 2
- Hosted by: Jorge Bernal; Jacqueline Bracamontes; Nastassja Bolívar
- Coaches: Wisin; Alejandra Guzmán; Luis Fonsi; Carlos Vives; Mau y Ricky (Comeback Stage)
- Winner: Sammy Colón
- Winning coach: Carlos Vives
- Runner-up: Jose Class

Release
- Original network: Telemundo
- Original release: January 19 – August 16, 2020

Season chronology
- ← Previous; Season 1

The second season of La Voz premiered January 19, 2020, on Telemundo. Wisin, Alejandra Guzmán, Luis Fonsi and Carlos Vives returned as coaches from the previous season. Meanwhile, Jorge Bernal and Jacqueline Bracamontes continued as hosts, joined by Nastassja Bolívar as the backstage reporter. This season also featured a fifth coach, Mau y Ricky, who selected contestants to participate in The Comeback Stage.

The season finale aired on August 16, 2020, with Sammy Colon named winner of season 2 of La Voz alongside his coach, Carlos Vives. He won the prize of US$200,000 and a contract with Universal Music Group.

== Coaches ==
La Voz U.S season 2 coaches

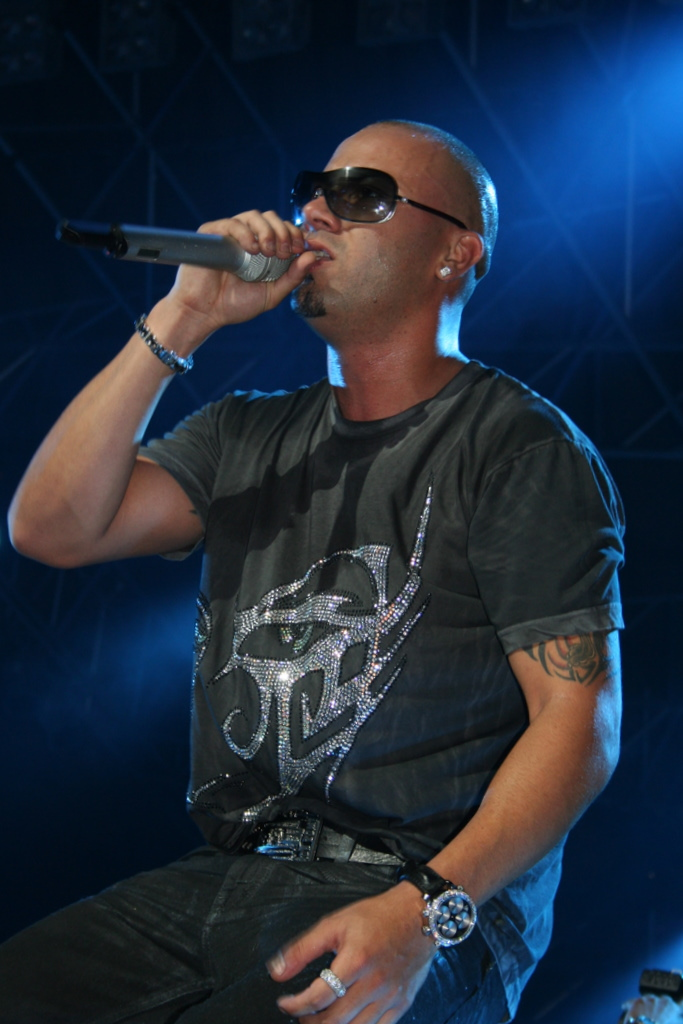
Wisin

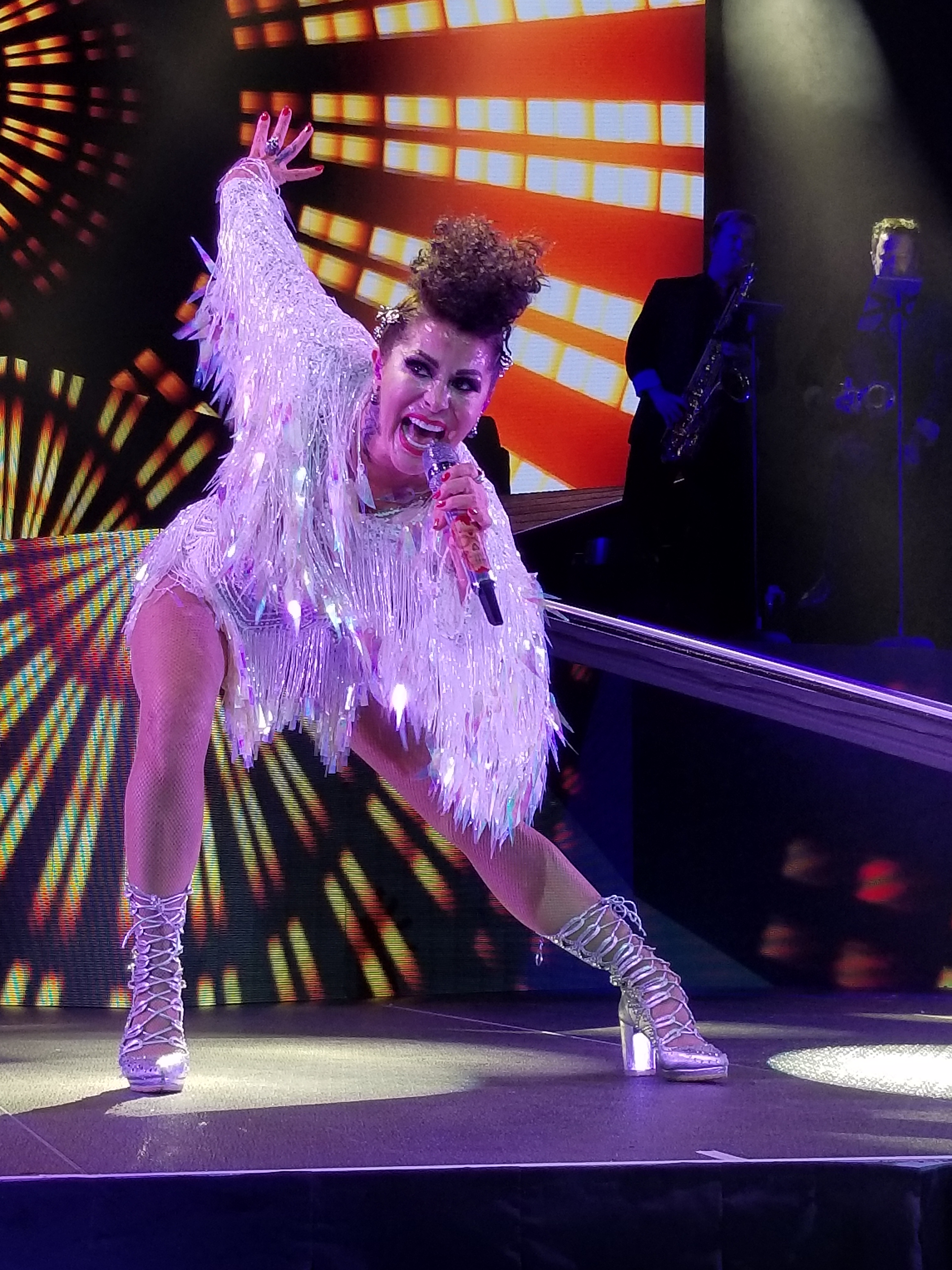
Alejandra Guzmán

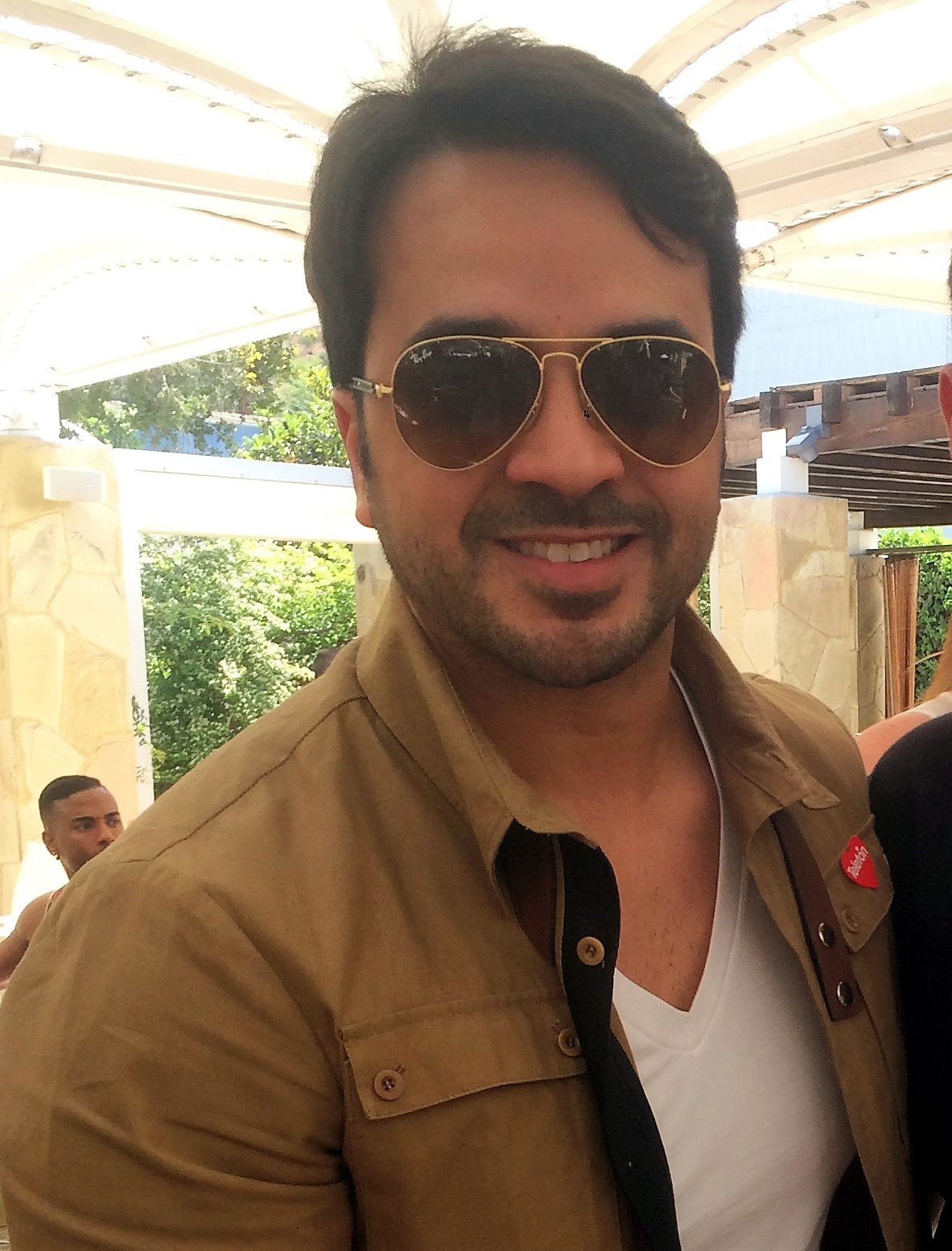
Luis Fonsi

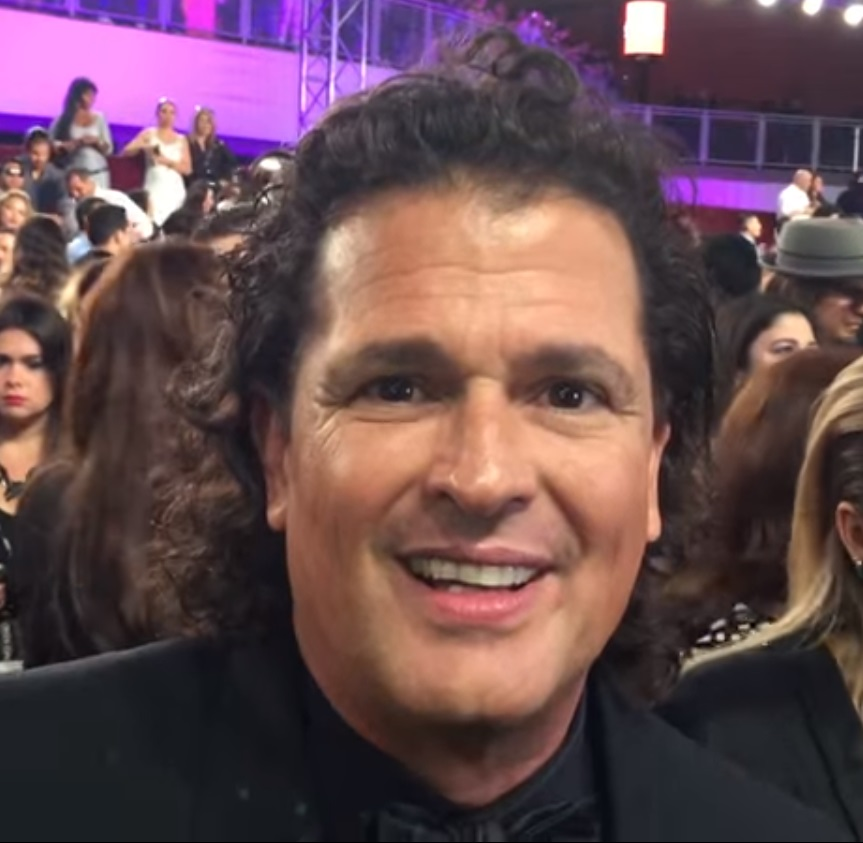
Carlos Vives

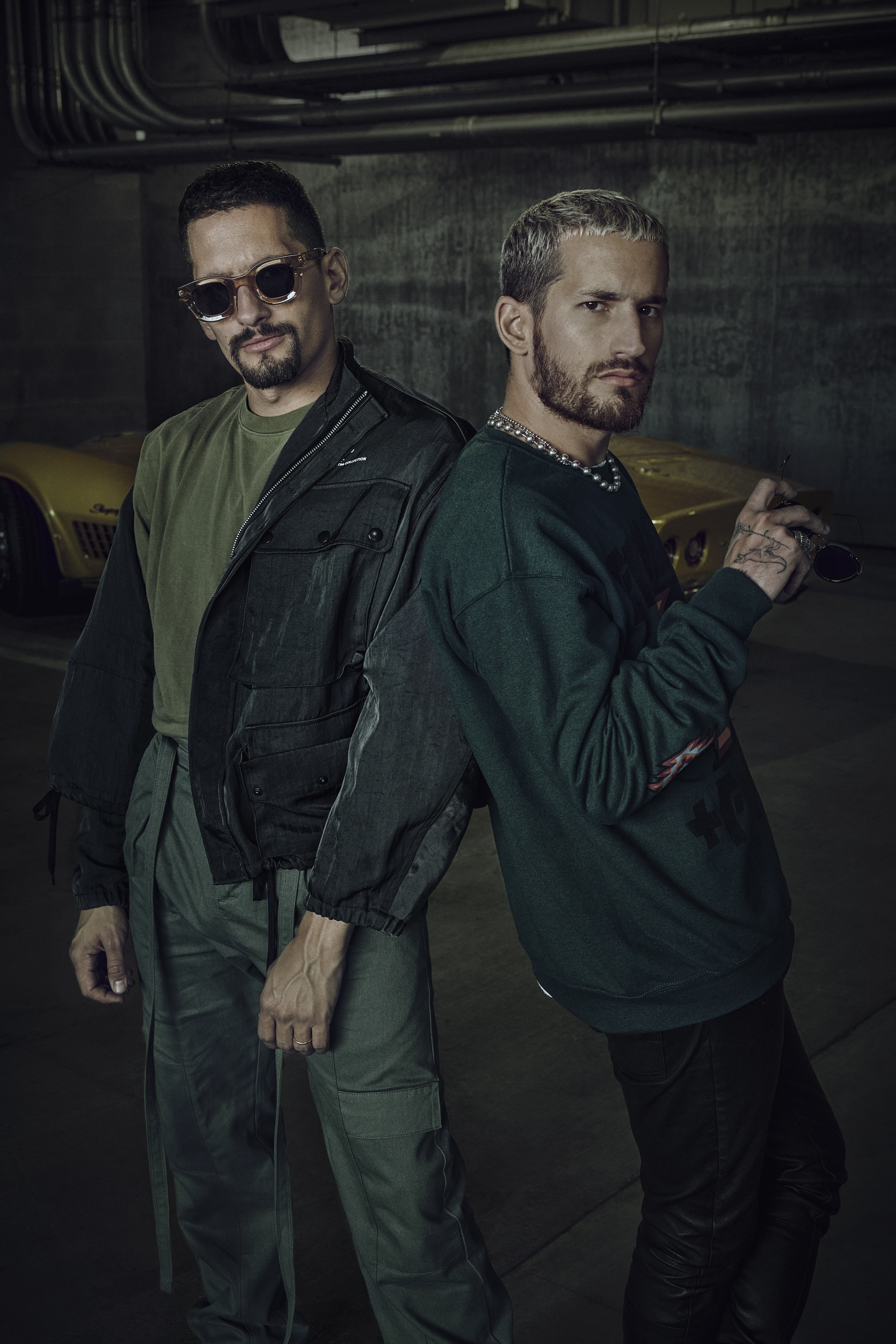
Mau y Ricky

In October 2019, it was officially announced that the show was renewed for a second season and would premiere January 19, 2020. The coaching panel remained the same, with Wisin, Alejandra Guzmán, Luis Fonsi, and Carlos Vives all returning alongside Jorge Bernal, and Jacqueline Bracamontes who returned as hosts. Backstage reporter, Jéssica Cediel did not return for the second season. Later, it was announced Nastassja Bolívar would replace Cediel. This season featured The Comeback Stage as seen on season 15 & season 16 of the English-language version, with duo Mau y Ricky as coach.

The advisors for the Battle round include: Mario Domm for Team Wisin, Jesse & Joy for Team Guzmán, Karol G for Team Fonsi, and Sebastián Yatra for Team Vives.

== Teams ==
Color key

- Winner
- Runner-up
- Third place
- Fourth place
- Eliminated in the Finale
- Eliminated in the Semifinal
- Joined another team
- Stolen in the Battles
- Eliminated in the Battles

Coaches	Top 54 artists						
Wisin							
Wisin	Andrea Serrano	Aaron Barrios	Albin St. Rose	Karen Galera	Christine Marcelle	Janine Rivera	Gabriel Alejandro
Wisin	Lizette Rubio	Diana Sofia Chiriboga	Ericson Gonzalez	Carlos Salazar	Karelia Letsos	Geissie Torres	Kendra Siebens
Alejandra Guzmán							
Alejandra Guzmán	Sugeily Cardona	Julio Cesar Castillo	Steven Sibaja	Santiago Ramos	Jose Palacio	Alexandra Carro	Alejandra Mor
Alejandra Guzmán	~~Jose Class~~	Eliana Sasics	Hilda Naranjo	Maria Cristina Bravo	Velaviee	Ninfa Molina	
Luis Fonsi							
Luis Fonsi	Jose Class	Rubi Mar Monge	Isai Reyes	Emily Piriz	Brian Cruz	Adrián Torres	Arturo Guerrero
Luis Fonsi	~~Alejandra Mor~~	~~Diana Puentes~~	Joselyn Alarcon	Envee	Michelle Rivera	Gabriel Carrero	
Carlos Vives							
Carlos Vives	Sammy Colon	Kayson Luis Burgos	Jorge Franco	Jimmy Rodriguez	Diana Puentes	Alonso Garcia	Michelle Raymon
Carlos Vives	~~Lizette Rubio~~	Marija Temo	Rebeca Salas	Caleb Mendez	Tiffany Galaviz	Oriana Lucas	
Mau y Ricky							
Mau y Ricky	~~Aaron Barrios~~	Franchesca Maia	Angely Rabsatt	Tony Carrera	Flavio Gamez	Yesica Daniela Orozco	
Note: Italicized names are stolen artists (names struck through within former teams).

== Blind Auditions ==
In the Blind Auditions, each coach had to complete their teams with 12 contestants. Each coach had two Blocks to prevent another of the coaches from getting a contestant. Six participants who got no chair turn were chosen to participate on The Comeback Stage.

NOTE: For consistency reasons, the "Quiero Tu Voz" button is referred by its English title, as recognised in summaries of other national versions of the franchise.

Color key

✔	Coach pressed "I WANT YOU" button
	Artist defaulted to a coach's team
	Artist elected a coach's team
	Artist was eliminated and was not invited back for "The Comeback Stage"
	Artist was eliminated, but got a second chance to compete in "The Comeback Stage"
✘	Coach pressed "I WANT YOU" button, but was blocked by another coach from getting the artist
	Blocked by Wisin; Blocked by Guzmán; Blocked by Fonsi; Blocked by Vives

=== Episode 1 (January 19) ===
Order	Artist	Age	Hometown	Song	Coach's and artist's choices			
Order	Artist	Age	Hometown	Song	Wisin	Guzmán	Fonsi	Vives
1	Jimmy Rodriguez	28	Santa Monica, California	"Parecen Viernes"	–	✔	–	✔
2	Sugeily Cardona	27	Moca, Puerto Rico	"Million Reasons"	✔	✔	✔	✔
3	Adrián Torres	19	Dallas, Texas	"La Bikina"	–	✔	✔	✔
4	Steven Sibaja	30	Alajuela, Costa Rica	"Aleluya"	–	✔	–	–
5	Lizette Rubio	33	Ventura, California	"Probablemente"	✔	✔	✘	✔
6	Flavio Gamez	29	Los Angeles, California	"Disparo al Corazón"	–	–	–	–
7	Christine Marcelle	30	Miami, Florida	"Entre Tu Cuerpo y el mío"	✔	✔	✔	✔
8	Maria Cristina Bravo	19	Tyler, Texas	"Side to Side"	–	✔	–	–
9	Angely Rabsatt	19	San Juan, Puerto Rico	"¡Corre!"	–	–	–	–

=== Episode 2 (January 26) ===
Order	Artist	Age	Hometown	Song	Coach's and artist's choices			
Order	Artist	Age	Hometown	Song	Wisin	Guzmán	Fonsi	Vives
1	Janine Rivera	22	Whittier, California	"La Cigarra"	✔	✔	✔	✔
2	Jose Class	27	Kissimmee, Florida	"Culpable o No"	–	✔	–	✔
3	Emily Piriz	23	Orlando, Florida	"Tell Me You Love Me"	✔	✔	✔	✔
4	Joseph Torres	20	San Juan, Puerto Rico	"Bachata En Fukuoka"	–	–	–	–
5	Velaviee	24	Miami, Florida	"Brillo"	–	✔	–	–
6	Arturo Guerrero	34	El Paso, Texas	"Secreto de Amor"	✘	✔	✔	✔
7	Franchesca Maia	19	Los Angeles, California	"Sola"	–	–	–	–
8	Karelia Letsos	18	Ontario, Canada	"Que Suenen"	✔	✔	✔	✔
9	Noel Canal Arias	20	Pomona, California	"Cuando Fuimos Nada"	–	–	–	–
10	Geissie Torres	31	Orlando, Florida	"If You Have My Love"	✔	✔	–	✔

=== Episode 3 (February 2) ===
Order	Artist	Age	Hometown	Song	Coach's and artist's choices			
Order	Artist	Age	Hometown	Song	Wisin	Guzmán	Fonsi	Vives
1	Joselyn Alarcon	19	Dallas, Texas	"Me Voy"	✔	✔	✔	–
2	Oriana Lucas	28	Miami, Florida	"A Ella"	–	✔	–	✔
3	Alberto Suárez	35	Miami, Florida	"El Cantante"	–	–	–	–
4	Tiffany Galaviz	18	Los Angeles, California	"La Puerta Negra"	–	✔	✔	✔
5	Julio "JLove" Bello	19	New York City, New York	"Traicionera"	–	–	–	–
6	Sammy Colon	32	Holiday, Florida	"El Triste"	✔	✔	✔	✔
7	Tony Carrera	24	Cudahy, California	"We Don't Talk Anymore"	–	–	–	–
8	Hilda Naranjo	32	Miami, Florida	"Como Yo Te Amo"	–	✔	–	✔
9	Kendra Siebens	22	Tampa, Florida	"7 Rings"	✔	–	–	–
10	Eliana Sasics	48	New York City, New York	"La Negra Tiene Tumbao"	–	✔	–	–

=== Episode 4 (February 9) ===
Order	Artist	Age	Hometown	Song	Coach's and artist's choices			
Order	Artist	Age	Hometown	Song	Wisin	Guzmán	Fonsi	Vives
1	Carlos Salazar	31	Miami, Florida	"Como Quien Pierde Una Estrella"	✔	✔	✔	✔
2	Alexandra Carro	25	Bayamon, Puerto Rico	"Qué Pretendes"	✘	✔	–	✔
3	Rebeca Salas	18	Houston, Texas	"I Don’t Care"	–	✔	–	✔
4	Aaron Barrios	26	Roma, Texas	"En Peligro de Extinción"	–	–	–	–
5	Marija Temo	51	Akron, Ohio	"Bulería"	✔	✔	✔	✔
6	Albin St. Rose	32	Washington D.C.	"Felices los 4"	✔	✔	✔	✔
7	Rubi Mar Monge	20	Tampa, Florida	"Never Enough"	✔	✔	✔	–
8	Enniel Ventura	–	Philadelphia, Pennsylvania	"11 PM"	–	—	–	–
9	Envee	42	Miami, Florida	"La Gata Bajo La Lluvia"	–	–	✔	–
10	Jennifer Diaz	18	Puerto Rico	"Un Año"	–	–	–	–

=== Episode 5 (February 16) ===
Order	Artist	Age	Hometown	Song	Coach's and artist's choices			
Order	Artist	Age	Hometown	Song	Wisin	Guzmán	Fonsi	Vives
1	Gabriel Alejandro	21	Aguada, Puerto Rico	"El Amante"	✔	✔	–	✔
2	Alonso Garcia	35	Chicago, Illinois	"Prometiste"	–	–	–	✔
3	Setareh Khatabi	33	Los Angeles, California	"Next Time"	–	–	–	–
4	Caleb Mendez	26	Alexandria, Virginia	"Déjala Que Vuelva"	✘	✔	✔	✔
5	Alejandra Mor	31	Miami, Florida	"Stand by Me"	–	–	✔	–
6	Julio Cesar Castillo	28	Chicago, Illinois	"Cielo Rojo"	✔	✔	✘	✔
7	Cesar Perdomo	22	New York City, New York	"Inovidable"	–	–	–	–
8	Gabriel Carrero	21	Orlando, Florida	"La Mejor Version De Mi"	✔	✔	✔	✔
9	Diana Sofia Chiriboga	25	Miami, Florida	"Mañana Es Too Late"	✔	✔	–	–
10	Ninfa Molina	41	New York City, New York	"Send My Love"	–	✔	–	–

=== Episode 6 (February 23) ===
Order	Artist	Age	Hometown	Song	Coach's and artist's choices			
Order	Artist	Age	Hometown	Song	Wisin	Guzmán	Fonsi	Vives
1	Jose Palacio	33	Cherry Hill, New Jersey	"Almohada"	–	✔	✔	–
2	Karen Galera	20	Dallas, Texas	"Skyscraper"	✔	✔	✘	✔
3	Danny Mora	32	Miami, Florida	"Entra en Mi Vida"	–	–	–	–
4	Kayson Luis Burgos	27	Jersey City, New Jersey	"I Heard It Through the Grapevine"	–	✔	✔	✔
5	Brian Cruz	19	Miami, Florida	"Que Hay De Malo"	✘	✔	✔	✔
6	Michelle Rivera	22	Sunrise, Florida	"Without Me"	✔	✔	✔	✔
7	Ericson Gonzalez	19	Ponce, Puerto Rico	"Bésame"	✔	✔	–	✔
8	Jazmin Rosas	19	Puerto Rico	"El Amor de Mi Vida"	–	–	–	–
9	Diana Puentes	26	Aguascalientes, Mexico	"Paloma Negra"	–	–	✔	–
10	Jorge Franco	19	Miami, Florida	"Desconocidos"	–	✔	✔	✔

=== Episode 7 (March 1) ===
Order	Artist	Age	Hometown	Song	Coach's and artist's choices			
Order	Artist	Age	Hometown	Song	Wisin	Guzmán	Fonsi	Vives
1	Andrea Serrano	20	Atlanta, Georgia	"She Will Be Loved"	✔	✘	✔	–
2	Yesica Daniela Orozco	22	Kansas City, Kansas	"Tú Sólo Tú"	Team full	–	–	–
3	Isai Reyes	22	San Juan, Puerto Rico	"Te Amo"	Team full	✔	✔	–
4	Olivia Huerta	43	Chicago, Illinois	"Dreaming of You"	Team full	–	Team full	–
5	Santiago Ramos	36	San Juan, Puerto Rico	"Tu Carcel"	Team full	✔	Team full	✔
6	Stephanie Sanquiz	35	Los Angeles, California	"Loca"	Team full	Team full	Team full	–
7	Michelle Raymon	24	Dallas, Texas	"Ocean"	Team full	Team full	Team full	✔

== The Battles ==
The Battle Rounds started on March 8. Season two advisors include: Mario Domm for Team Wisin, Jesse & Joy for Team Guzmán, Karol G for Team Fonsi, and Sebastián Yatra for Team Vives. The coaches can steal one losing artist from other coaches. Contestants who win their battle or are stolen by another coach will advance to the Cross Battles.

Color key:

Artist won the Battle and advanced to the Cross Battles
Artist lost the Battle but was stolen by another coach and advanced to the Cross Battles
Artist lost the Battle and was eliminated

Episode	Coach	Order	Winner	Song	Loser	'Steal' result			
Episode	Coach	Order	Winner	Song	Loser	Wisin	Guzmán	Fonsi	Vives
Episode 8 (Sunday, March 8, 2020)	Alejandra Guzmán	1	Julio Cesar Castillo	"Miedo"	Ninfa Molina	—	—N/a	—	—
Episode 8 (Sunday, March 8, 2020)	Wisin	2	Gabriel Alejandro	"Runaway"	Kendra Siebens	—N/a	—	—	—
Episode 8 (Sunday, March 8, 2020)	Luis Fonsi	3	Adrián Torres	"Lástima Que Sean Ajenas"	Diana Puentes	—	—	—N/a	✔
Episode 8 (Sunday, March 8, 2020)	Carlos Vives	4	Jimmy Rodriguez	"Llorarás"	Oriana Lucas	—	—	—	Team full
Episode 8 (Sunday, March 8, 2020)	Luis Fonsi	5	Rubi Mar Monge	"Dancing with a Stranger"	Gabriel Carrero	—	—	—N/a	Team full
Episode 8 (Sunday, March 8, 2020)	Wisin	6	Albin St. Rose	"Somos tú y yo"	Geissie Torres	—N/a	—	—	Team full
Episode 9 (Sunday, March 15, 2020)	Alejandra Guzmán	1	Sugeily Cardona	"Llorar"	Jose Class	–	—N/a	✔	Team full
Episode 9 (Sunday, March 15, 2020)	Carlos Vives	2	Alonso Garcia	"Lo Busque"	Tiffany Galaviz	—	—	Team full	Team full
Episode 9 (Sunday, March 15, 2020)	Luis Fonsi	3	Isai Reyes	"Wake Me Up"	Michelle Rivera	—	—	Team full	Team full
Episode 9 (Sunday, March 15, 2020)	Wisin	4	Christine Marcelle	"Que Bueno Baila Usted"	Karelia Letsos	—N/a	—	Team full	Team full
Episode 9 (Sunday, March 15, 2020)	Carlos Vives	5	Michelle Raymon	"No Me Compares"	Caleb Mendez	—	—	Team full	Team full
Episode 9 (Sunday, March 15, 2020)	Alejandra Guzmán	6	Steven Sibaja	"Tutu"	Velaviee	—	—N/a	Team full	Team full
Episode 10 (Sunday, March 22, 2020)	Carlos Vives	1	Jorge Franco	"Cristina"	Rebeca Salas	—	—	Team full	Team full
Episode 10 (Sunday, March 22, 2020)	Alejandra Guzmán	2	Alexandra Carro	"Tusa"	Maria Cristina Bravo	—	—N/a	Team full	Team full
Episode 10 (Sunday, March 22, 2020)	Carlos Vives	3	Kayson Luis Burgos	"Someone You Loved"	Lizette Rubio	✔	—	Team full	Team full
Episode 10 (Sunday, March 22, 2020)	Luis Fonsi	4	Arturo Guerrero	"Bésame Mucho"	Envee	Team full	—	Team full	Team full
Episode 10 (Sunday, March 22, 2020)	Wisin	5	Janine Rivera	"La Magia De Tus Ojos"	Carlos Salazar	Team full	—	Team full	Team full
Episode 10 (Sunday, March 22, 2020)	Alejandra Guzmán	6	Santiago Ramos	"No Ha Parado de Llover"	Hilda Naranjo	Team full	—N/a	Team full	Team full
Episode 11 (Sunday, March 29, 2020)	Carlos Vives	1	Sammy Colon	"A Mi Manera"	Marija Temo	Team full	—	Team full	Team full
Episode 11 (Sunday, March 29, 2020)	Luis Fonsi	2	Emily Piriz	"Beautiful People"	Alejandra Mor	Team full	✔	Team full	Team full
Episode 11 (Sunday, March 29, 2020)	Wisin	3	Andrea Serrano	"Coleccionista de Canciones"	Ericson Gonzalez	Team full	Team full	Team full	Team full
Episode 11 (Sunday, March 29, 2020)	Luis Fonsi	4	Brian Cruz	"Mi Mala"	Joselyn Alarcon	Team full	Team full	Team full	Team full
Episode 11 (Sunday, March 29, 2020)	Alejandra Guzmán	5	Jose Palacio	"Aguanile"	Eliana Sasics	Team full	Team full	Team full	Team full
Episode 11 (Sunday, March 29, 2020)	Wisin	6	Karen Galera	"Good as Hell"	Diana Sofia Chiriboga	Team full	Team full	Team full	Team full

== The Comeback Stage ==
For this season, the show added a brand new phase of competition called The Comeback Stage that was exclusive to the Telemundo App, La Voz YouTube Channel, Instagram, Twitter and Telemundo.com. After failing to turn a chair in the blind auditions, artists had the chance to be selected by fifth coach Mau y Ricky to become a member of their six-person team. The Comeback Stage consists of three rounds: The Battles, Semifinals and Finale. In the Finale, the public decides who wins, who will officially join one of the four main teams for the Semifinals.

The first episode explained the format of The Comeback Stage. The digital episodes were available Mondays at 10 am/9c on Twitter Live, and were later available on all other digital platforms.

=== The Battles ===
The Battles were part of the main show's Battle segment. Like the show itself, two artist faced each other in a same song battle, and only one advanced based on their coach's choice.

Artist won the Battle and advanced to the Semifinals
Artist lost the Battle and was eliminated

Episode (Digital)	Coach	Winner	Song	Loser
Episode 2 (March 9, 2020)	Mau y Ricky	Aaron Barrios	"De Los Besos Que Te Di"	Yesica Daniela Orozco
Episode 3 (March 16, 2020)	Mau y Ricky	Franchesca Maia	"Quiero Volver"	Flavio Gamez
Episode 4 (March 23, 2020)	Mau y Ricky	Angely Rabsatt	"Tanto"	Tony Carrera

=== Semifinal ===
The Semifinal was part of the transition between the Battles and Cross Battles segment of the show. Due to the COVID-19 pandemic, this phase was not shown until the return of the show after the pause. Mau y Ricky chose two artists to advance and the other one was eliminated.

Artists won the Semifinals and advanced to the Finale
Artist lost the Semifinals was eliminated

Episode (Digital)	Coach	Winners	Song	Loser
Episode 5 (July 20, 2020)	Mau y Ricky	Franchesca Maia	"Tequila"	Angely Rabsatt
Episode 5 (July 20, 2020)	Mau y Ricky	Aaron Barrios	"Tequila"	Angely Rabsatt

=== Finale ===
The Finale was part of the Cross Battle segment of the show. The performances for both artists were on August 3rd, with results being announced on Episode 14 and the winner becoming a Semifinalist. Aaron Barrios received the highest votes and chose to join Team Wisin.

Artist received majority of Public's votes and won The Comeback Stage
Artist was eliminated

Episode	Coach	Song	Artists		Song
Episode	Coach	Song	Winner	Loser	Song
Episode 6 (August 3, 2020)	Mau y Ricky	"Me Vas a Extrañar"	Aaron Barrios	Franchesca Maia	"Sunflower"

== Final Phase ==
The live shows were originally scheduled to start April 5. Due to the COVID-19 pandemic, Telemundo delayed them until July 26. In contrast to season 18 of the show's NBC counterpart The Voice (where the live rounds were conducted in a fully-remote format), in-studio production resumed in Miami at Cisneros Studios; under enhanced health and safety protocols in cooperation with Film Florida, including social distancing and no studio audience, with episodes recorded earlier in the day prior to broadcast.

This season, phone calls and text messaging voting methods were removed, leaving Comcast-related sites (Telemundo's Web site and app, along with Xfinity X1) as the only options for voting.

Color key:

Artist was saved by the Public's votes
Artist was eliminated

=== Week 1 & 2: Cross Battles (July 26 & August 2) ===
This season, the Playoffs were replaced by the Cross Battles (Los Enfrentamientos) which compromised episodes 12 and 13. Also, this season the beginning of the "Live Shows" featured a Top 28 instead of a Top 32. Each night featured seven pairs, where coaches selected an artist from their team, then challenged a fellow coach to compete against, and this coach selected an artist as well. The artist with the highest public's votes from each cross battle advanced, with the other artist being automatically eliminated.

For these Cross Battles, only 24 of the 28 contestants were permitted to perform in the main studio. In compliance with safety precautions and guidelines of the Centers for Disease Control and Prevention and Film Florida, four contestants -- Sugeily Cardona, Julio Castillo, Santiago Ramos and Alonso Garcia -- performed from a remote room backstage which was displayed on the stage's screen.

Episode	Order	Challenger			Challenged		
Episode	Order	Coach	Song	Artist	Artist	Song	Coach
Episode 12 (Sunday, July 26, 2020)	1	Luis Fonsi	"Pero Me Acuerdo de Ti"	Emily Piriz	Alexandra Carro	"Solo de Mí"	Alejandra Guzmán
Episode 12 (Sunday, July 26, 2020)	2	Wisin	"Por Amarte Así"	Lizette Rubio	Diana Puentes	"Aparentemente Bien"	Carlos Vives
Episode 12 (Sunday, July 26, 2020)	3	Alejandra Guzmán	"Adoro"	Jose Palacio	Sammy Colon	"La Barca"	Carlos Vives
Episode 12 (Sunday, July 26, 2020)	4	Carlos Vives	"Lo que te di"	Jimmy Rodriguez	Karen Galera	"Amor Genuino"	Wisin
Episode 12 (Sunday, July 26, 2020)	5	Luis Fonsi	"Caballero"	Adrián Torres	Albin St. Rose	"Estar Contigo"	Wisin
Episode 12 (Sunday, July 26, 2020)	6	Alejandra Guzmán	"Mi Persona Favorita"	Alejandra Mor	Isai Reyes	"Marinero"	Luis Fonsi
Episode 12 (Sunday, July 26, 2020)	7	Wisin	"Indeciso"	Gabriel Alejandro	Kayson Luis Burgos	"Otro Trago"	Carlos Vives
Episode 13 (Sunday, August 2, 2020)	1	Wisin	"La Fiesta Del Mariachi"	Janine Rivera	Rubi Mar Monge	"La de la Mala Suerte"	Luis Fonsi
Episode 13 (Sunday, August 2, 2020)	2	Carlos Vives	"Si Nos Dejan"	Michelle Raymon	Andrea Serrano	"Antes"	Wisin
Episode 13 (Sunday, August 2, 2020)	3	Luis Fonsi	"En Cero"	Brian Cruz	Steven Sibaja	"Me Llamas"	Alejandra Guzmán
Episode 13 (Sunday, August 2, 2020)	4	Alejandra Guzmán	"Ven"	Sugeily Cardona	Arturo Guerrero	"El reloj"	Luis Fonsi
Episode 13 (Sunday, August 2, 2020)	5	Luis Fonsi	"Dígale"	Jose Class	Christine Marcelle	"Como Abeja al Panal"	Wisin
Episode 13 (Sunday, August 2, 2020)	6	Carlos Vives	"Bonita"	Jorge Franco	Santiago Ramos	"Shake Your Bon-Bon"	Alejandra Guzmán
Episode 13 (Sunday, August 2, 2020)	7	Alejandra Guzmán	"Amor Del Bueno"	Julio Cesar Castillo	Alonso Garcia	"Perfidia"	Carlos Vives

=== Week 3: Semifinal (August 9) ===
During the episode, the results for both nights of Cross Battles were announced one by one. After announcing the winner, the winner's Semifinal performance followed. After the fourteen results and performances were announced, Aaron Barrios was revealed as The Comeback Stage winner. He decided to join the Top 15 on Team Wisin.

This season all teams had a different amount of artists. Team Fonsi & Team Vives advanced with five members each. Team Guzmán & Team Wisin advanced with two members each, but with The Comeback Stage artist Wisin advanced with three.

Episode	Coach	Order	Artist	Song	Result
Episode 14 (Sunday, August 9, 2020)	Carlos Vives	1	Jimmy Rodriguez	"Me Tengo Que Ir"	Eliminated
Episode 14 (Sunday, August 9, 2020)	Luis Fonsi	2	Emily Piriz	"Como si no nos hubiéramos amado"	Eliminated
Episode 14 (Sunday, August 9, 2020)	Alejandra Guzmán	3	Julio Cesar Castillo	"Directo al Corazón"	Eliminated
Episode 14 (Sunday, August 9, 2020)	Wisin	4	Albin St. Rose	"Fútbol y Rumba"	Eliminated
Episode 14 (Sunday, August 9, 2020)	Luis Fonsi	5	Isai Reyes	"Falta Amor"	Eliminated
Episode 14 (Sunday, August 9, 2020)	Carlos Vives	6	Sammy Colon	"Cambio de Piel"	Public's vote
Episode 14 (Sunday, August 9, 2020)	Alejandra Guzmán	7	Sugeily Cardona	"Perdón"	Public's vote
Episode 14 (Sunday, August 9, 2020)	Luis Fonsi	8	Brian Cruz	"TBT"	Eliminated
Episode 14 (Sunday, August 9, 2020)	Carlos Vives	9	Diana Puentes	"La Retirada"	Eliminated
Episode 14 (Sunday, August 9, 2020)	Wisin	10	Andrea Serrano	"Voy a Olvidarte"	Public's vote
Episode 14 (Sunday, August 9, 2020)	Luis Fonsi	11	Rubi Mar Monge	"Alguien"	Eliminated
Episode 14 (Sunday, August 9, 2020)	Carlos Vives	12	Jorge Franco	"ADMV"	Eliminated
Episode 14 (Sunday, August 9, 2020)	Luis Fonsi	13	Jose Class	"En Esta No"	Public's vote
Episode 14 (Sunday, August 9, 2020)	Carlos Vives	14	Kayson Luis Burgos	"Tiburones"	Eliminated
Episode 14 (Sunday, August 9, 2020)	Wisin	15	Aaron Barrios	"Contigo"	Eliminated

=== Week 4: Finale (August 16) ===
The final episode was filmed on Sunday, August 16th with same-day coverage that night. It featured group performances from the coaches with their team members, followed by group performances of the semi-finalists and solo performances of the coaches and guests. After performance #9, 10, 11, 12 a group of three to four people were called up to the stage and on each occasion one of the artists was announced as a finalist. At the end of the evening the Top 4 results were announced.

Order	Performers	Song
15.1	Carlos Vives and his team (Sammy, Jimmy, Kayson, Diana, Jorge)	"Fruta Fresca" / "Y ahí llego yo"
15.2	Luis Fonsi and his team (Jose, Emily, Rubi, Isai, Brian)	"Nada Es Para Siempre" / "Date pa Vuelta" / "Échame la Culpa"
15.3	Alejandra Guzmán and her team (Sugeily, Julio)	"Tan Sólo Tú"
15.4	Wisin and his team (Andrea, Aaron, Albin)	"Duele el Corazón"
15.5	Brian Cruz, Rubi Monge, Jorge Franco, Albin St. Rose	"China"
15.6	Emily Piriz, Kayson Burgos, Isai Reyes	"Señorita"
15.7	Sammy Colon, Jose Class, Sugeily Cardona, Andrea Serrano	"Memories"
15.8	Julio Castillo, Jimmy Rodriguez, Diana Puentes, Aaron Barrios	"Te Olvidé"
15.9	Luis Fonsi	"Girasoles"
15.10	Wisin & Rauw Alejandro	"Una Noche"
15.11	Alejandra Guzmán	"El Rock De La Cárcel" / "La Plaga"
15.12	Carlos Vives	"No Te Vayas"
15.13	Mau y Ricky & Camilo	"La Boca" / "Papás"

==== Final result ====
Artist	Team	Result
Sammy Colon	Carlos Vives	Winner
Jose Class	Luis Fonsi	Runner-up
Sugeily Cardona	Alejandra Guzmán	Third place
Andrea Serrano	Wisin	Fourth place

== Elimination Chart ==
=== Overall ===
Color key
Artist's info

- Team Wisin
- Team Guzmán
- Team Fonsi
- Team Vives
- Comeback Stage Artist

Result details

- Winner
- Runner-up
- Third place
- Fourth place
- Saved by the public
- Artist won the Comeback Stage and joined another team
- Eliminated
- Did not perform on that week

Final Stage Results per week
Artists	Week 1	Week 2	Week 3	Week 4 Finale
Sammy Colon	Safe		Safe	Winner
Jose Class		Safe	Safe	Runner-up
Sugeily Cardona		Safe	Safe	3rd place
Andrea Serrano		Safe	Safe	4th place
Jimmy Rodriguez	Safe		Eliminated	Eliminated (week 3)
Rubi Mar Monge		Safe	Eliminated	Eliminated (week 3)
Kayson Luis Burgos	Safe		Eliminated	Eliminated (week 3)
Julio Cesar Castillo		Safe	Eliminated	Eliminated (week 3)
Emily Piriz	Safe		Eliminated	Eliminated (week 3)
Albin St. Rose	Safe		Eliminated	Eliminated (week 3)
Isai Reyes	Safe		Eliminated	Eliminated (week 3)
Jorge Franco		Safe	Eliminated	Eliminated (week 3)
Brian Cruz		Safe	Eliminated	Eliminated (week 3)
Diana Puentes	Safe		Eliminated	Eliminated (week 3)
Aaron Barrios	Comeback Stage	Safe	Eliminated	Eliminated (week 3)
Franchesca Maia	Comeback Stage	Eliminated	Eliminated (week 2)	
Alonso Garcia		Eliminated	Eliminated (week 2)	
Santiago Ramos		Eliminated	Eliminated (week 2)	
Christine Marcelle		Eliminated	Eliminated (week 2)	
Arturo Guerrero		Eliminated	Eliminated (week 2)	
Steven Sibaja		Eliminated	Eliminated (week 2)	
Michelle Raymon		Eliminated	Eliminated (week 2)	
Janine Rivera		Eliminated	Eliminated (week 2)	
Gabriel Alejandro Arredondo	Eliminated	Eliminated (week 1)		
Alejandra Mor	Eliminated	Eliminated (week 1)		
Adrián Torres	Eliminated	Eliminated (week 1)		
Karen Galera	Eliminated	Eliminated (week 1)		
Jose Palacio	Eliminated	Eliminated (week 1)		
Lizette Rubio	Eliminated	Eliminated (week 1)		
Alexandra Carro	Eliminated	Eliminated (week 1)		

=== Teams ===
Color key
Artist's info

- Team Wisin
- Team Guzmán
- Team Fonsi
- Team Vives

Results details

- Winner
- Runner-up
- Third place
- Fourth place
- Eliminated
- Did not perform on that week

Artists	Week 1	Week 2	Week 3	Week 4 Finale
Andrea Serrano		Advanced	Advanced	Fourth place
Albin St. Rose	Advanced		Eliminated	
Aaron Barrios	Comeback Stage	Advanced	Eliminated	
Christine Marcelle		Eliminated		
Janine Rivera		Eliminated		
Gabriel Alejandro Arredondo	Eliminated			
Karen Galera	Eliminated			
Lizette Rubio	Eliminated			
Sugeily Cardona		Advanced	Advanced	Third place
Julio Cesar Castillo		Advanced	Eliminated	
Santiago Ramos		Eliminated		
Steven Sibaja		Eliminated		
Alejandra Mor	Eliminated			
Jose Palacio	Eliminated			
Alexandra Carro	Eliminated			
Jose Class		Advanced	Advanced	Runner-up
Emily Piriz	Advanced		Eliminated	
Isai Reyes	Advanced		Eliminated	
Brian Cruz		Advanced	Eliminated	
Rubi Mar Monge		Advanced	Eliminated	
Arturo Guerrero		Eliminated		
Adrián Torres	Eliminated			
Sammy Colon	Advanced		Advanced	Winner
Diana Puentes	Advanced		Eliminated	
Kayson Luis Burgos	Advanced		Eliminated	
Jimmy Rodriguez	Advanced		Eliminated	
Jorge Franco		Advanced	Eliminated	
Michelle Raymon		Eliminated		
Alonso Garcia		Eliminated		

== Artists' appearance on other shows ==
- Adrián Torres, Jose Class and Albin St. Rose all competed on the show's first season but failed to turn any chairs.
- Steven Sibaja participated in the eighth season of Mexican version where he was part of Team Belinda.
- Maria Cristina Bravo and Gabriel Carrero competed in the second season of La Banda, but failed to reach the second and third phase of the competition, respectively.
- Angely Rabsatt competed on the second season of La Voz Kids and reached the semifinals on team Royce.
- Janine Rivera participated on the tenth season of Estrella TV's show Tengo Talento, Mucho Talento where she reached the finale.
- Emily Piriz participated in season 13 of American Idol where she placed 12th place.
- Setareh Khatibi appeared on the sixth season of Nuestra Belleza Latina and finished second.
- Julio Cesar Castillo competed in the third season of the U.S English version, but was eliminated in the Live Playoffs.
- Karen Galera competed on the sixteenth season of the U.S English version, but was eliminated during the Live Cross Battles.
- Brian Cruz won the second season of La Banda where he was part of the band named MIX5.

== Ratings ==
Viewership and ratings per episode of La Voz (American TV series) season 2
No.	Title	Air date	Timeslot (ET)	Rating/share (18–49)	Viewers (millions)
1	"The Blind Auditions, Part 1"	January 19, 2020	Sunday 9:00 p.m.	0.4/2	1.04
2	"The Blind Auditions, Part 2"	January 26, 2020	Sunday 9:00 p.m.	0.3/2	1.08
3	"The Blind Auditions, Part 3"	February 2, 2020	Sunday 9:00 p.m.	0.3/1	0.90
4	"The Blind Auditions, Part 4"	February 9, 2020	Sunday 9:00 p.m.	0.3/2	1.07
5	"The Blind Auditions, Part 5"	February 16, 2020	Sunday 9:00 p.m.	0.4/2	1.15
6	"The Blind Auditions, Part 6"	February 23, 2020	Sunday 9:00 p.m.	0.3/2	1.03
7	"The Blind Auditions, Part 7"	March 1, 2020	Sunday 9:00 p.m.	0.4/2	1.29
8	"The Battles, Part 1"	March 8, 2020	Sunday 9:00 p.m.	0.4/2	1.17
9	"The Battles, Part 2"	March 15, 2020	Sunday 9:00 p.m.	0.4/2	1.26
10	"The Battles, Part 3"	March 22, 2020	Sunday 9:00 p.m.	0.4/2	1.19
11	"The Battles, Part 4"	March 29, 2020	Sunday 9:00 p.m.	0.3/2	1.06
12	"Cross Battles, Part 1"	July 26, 2020	Sunday 9:00 p.m.	0.2/1	0.80
13	"Cross Battles, Part 2"	August 2, 2020	Sunday 9:00 p.m.	0.2/1	0.73
14	"Semifinals"	August 9, 2020	Sunday 9:00 p.m.	0.2/1	0.79
15	"Finale"	August 16, 2020	Sunday 9:00 p.m.	0.2/1	0.89
