= La Voz (American TV series) =

- Genre: Reality competition
- Created by: John de Mol Jr.
- Directed by: Sergio Lazarov
- Creative director: Pablo Erminy
- Presented by: Jacqueline Bracamontes; Jorge Bernal
- Judges: Wisin; Alejandra Guzmán; Luis Fonsi; Carlos Vives
- Composer: Martijn Schimmer
- Country of origin: United States
- Original language: Spanish
- No. of seasons: 2
- No. of episodes: 30

Production
- Executive producers: John de Mol; Cisco Suárez; Macarena Moreno; Moira Noriega
- Producer: Gloria Diliz
- Production locations: Cisneros Studios; Miami, Florida
- Camera setup: Multi-camera
- Running time: 120–150 minutes
- Production companies: Talpa Media (2019); Warner Horizon Television; Telemundo Studios; ITV America (2020)

Original release
- Network: Telemundo
- Release: January 13, 2019 – August 16, 2020

Related
- The Voice franchise; The Voice (American TV series); La Voz Kids

La Voz is an American Spanish-language singing competition television series broadcast on Telemundo. The show premiered January 13, 2019, and is based on the original The Voice of Holland, and part of the global franchise The Voice that aims to find aspiring singers, age 18 or over, drawn from public auditions. The winner receives a monetary prize and a record contract with Universal Music.

The four coaches for the first season were Luis Fonsi, Alejandra Guzmán, Carlos Vives and Wisin. The same four returned for the second season.

La Voz is the second adaptation of the Voice format in the United States, after The Voice, which began airing in 2011. There had also previously been a Spanish-language adaptation of the spinoff format The Voice Kids in the United States, La Voz Kids, which aired for four seasons from 2013 to 2016.

== Overview ==
=== Format ===
Throughout the competition, several stages are included, as:

=== National casting ===
In the national casting, participants in 15 broadcasts are selected. The coaches do not attend this initial phase but members of the production team do. The casting procedure can be online or in person in any of the following cities:

- First season, Starting June 23, 2018: Los Angeles, Puerto Rico, New York, Chicago, San Antonio, Miami
- Second season, Starting July 6, 2019: Miami, New York, Puerto Rico, Los Angeles, Chicago, Houston

=== Stage 1: The Blind Auditions ===
The four coaches' chairs will have their backs to the participants, allowing them to judge a contestant based only on their voice. If the coach likes the participant's voice, he/she will press the "QUIERO TU VOZ" button, turning the chair around. When the judge is facing the participant this indicated that they have been selected to advance. If more than one coach presses the button, the participant will have the option to decide who they want to work with in the competition. Each coach is granted the power of The Block Button where they can block another coach from obtaining the artist (in season 2 the blocks increased to two per coach). If a participant doesn't have any judges turn their chairs they are then eliminated.

=== Stage 2: The Battles ===
In this stage; the coaches will reduce their team by half by putting two members of their team into battle against each other, singing the same song. At the end each coach will make the decision on who should move onto the next stage, the other will be eliminated. However, other coaches have the ability to steal an eliminated contestant by pressing the "QUIERO TU VOZ" button. If more than one coach presses the button, the participant will choose their new coach. During this point coaches also have the ability to bring in outside advisers to help them coach their contestants.

=== Stage 3: Live Shows ===
This is the last stage in where the participant plays it off to receive the votes from the public to advance every week. The public votes after every night performance and the artists with the highest votes advance. The remaining participants can be saved by their coach’s vote and advanced to the following week. If they are not saved by the public or their coach they will be eliminated. In the finale there will be 4 participants left and the winner chosen by the public will be called La Voz U.S.

== Coaches and hosts ==
On May 10, 2018, Telemundo announced that they would premiere the Spanish-language version of NBC singing competition The Voice in 2019, called La Voz, with Luis Fonsi tapped as the first coach. On July 5, 2018, Telemundo announced Alejandra Guzmán has joined the show as a coach, followed by Wisin on July 12. On September 13, 2018, it was confirmed that Carlos Vives would be joining the show as the fourth and final coach. Jorge Bernal and Jéssica Cediel debuted as hosts for the first season, followed by Jacqueline Bracamontes who joined them in the battle rounds. In October 2019 it was announced that all four coaches would return for the show's second season. In January 2020, it was announced that Nastassja Bolívar would join the show as new digital reporter replacing Cediel.

== Coaches' timeline ==
Coach	Seasons		
Coach	1	2	3
Wisin			
Alejandra Guzmán			
Luis Fonsi			
Carlos Vives			
Alejandro Sanz			
Laura Pausini			
Manuel Carrasco			

Coaches

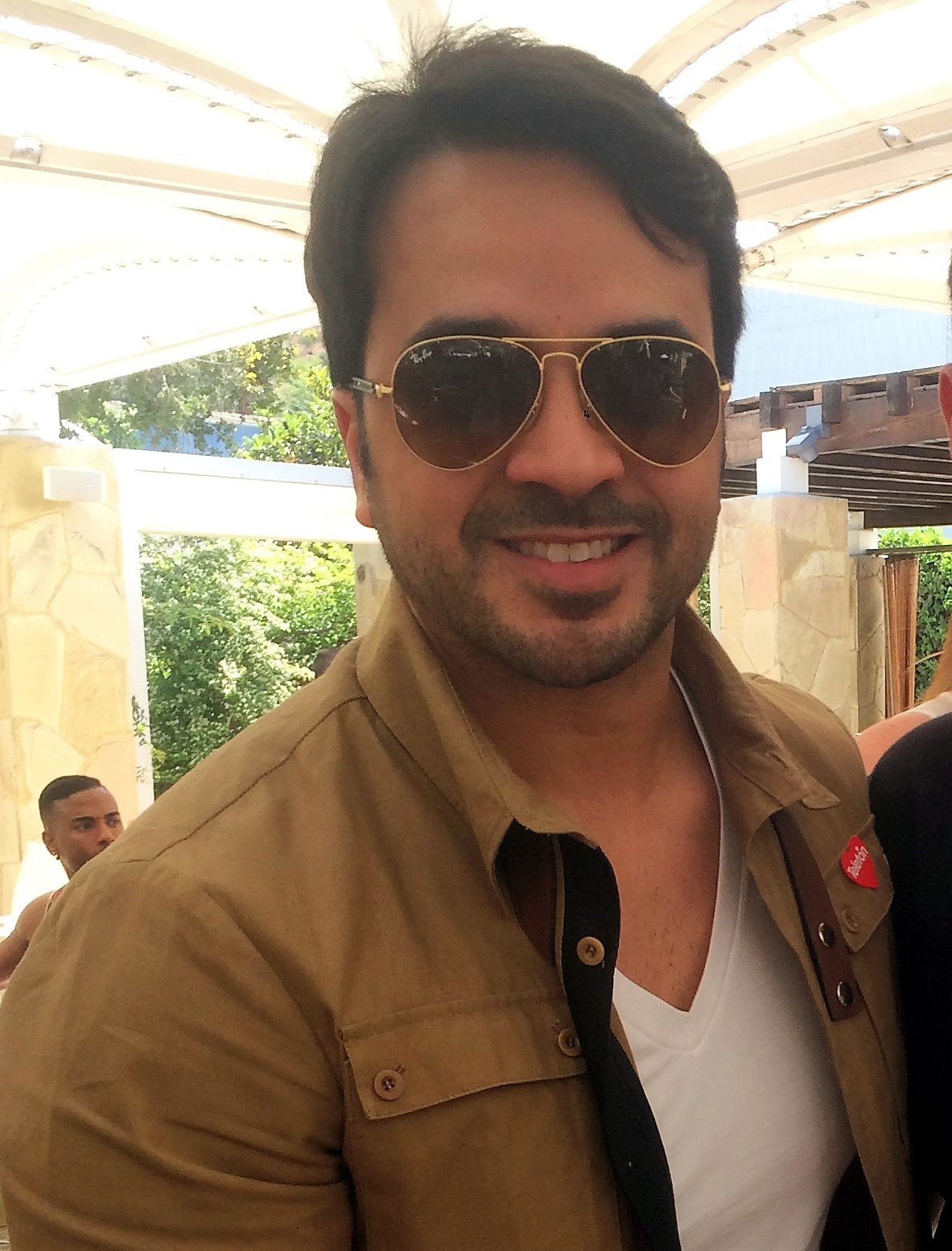
Luis Fonsi (2019—2020)

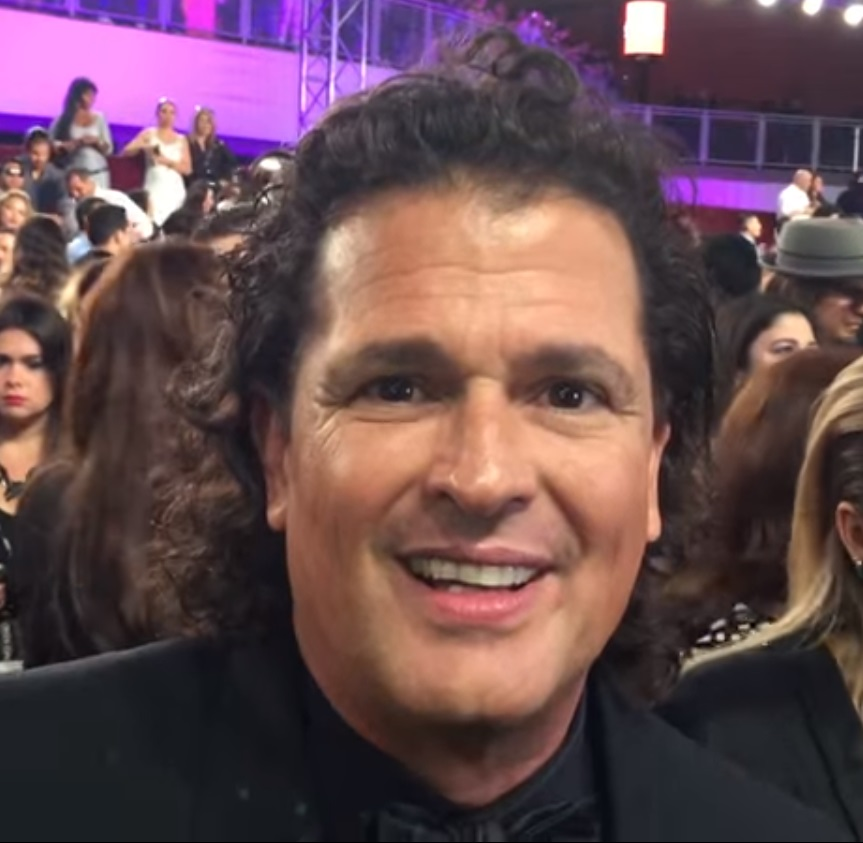
Carlos Vives (2019—2020)

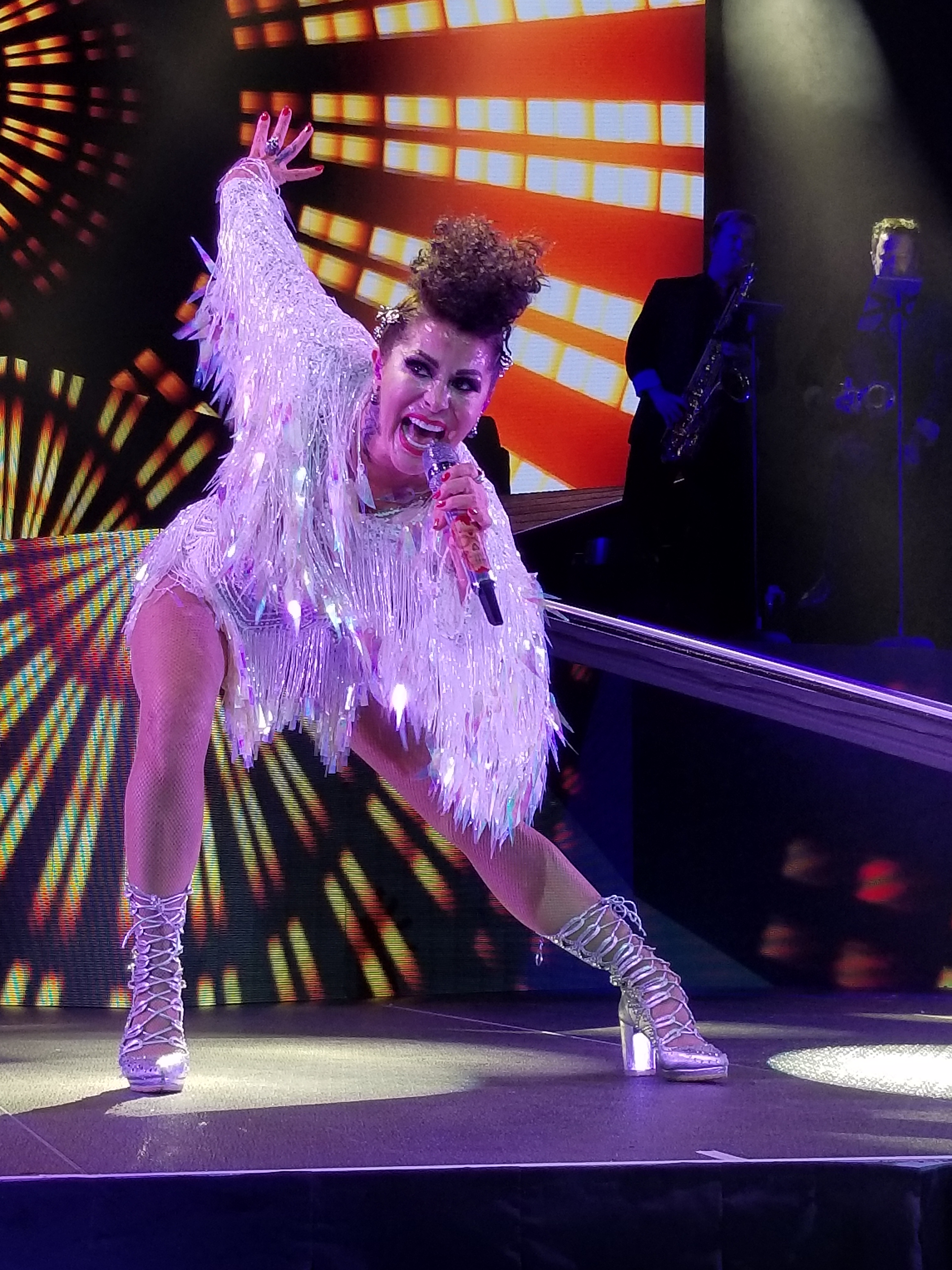
Alejandra Guzmán (2019—2020)

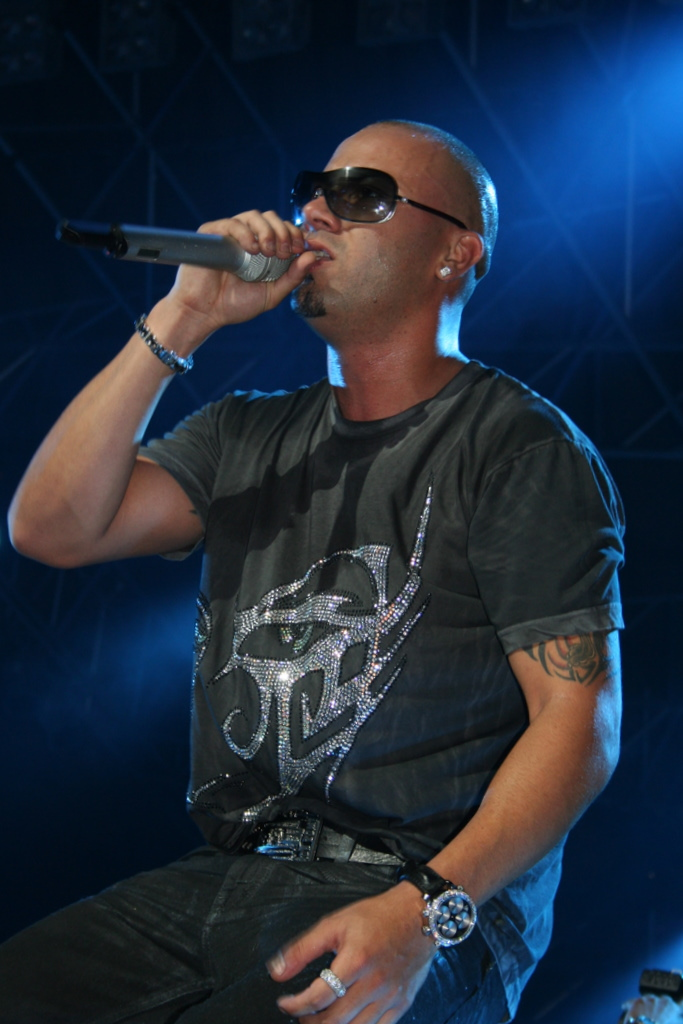
Wisin (2019—2020)

== Coaches' advisors ==
Season	Coaches			
1	Wisin	Alejandra Guzmán	Luis Fonsi	Carlos Vives
1	Prince Royce	Becky G	Christian Nodal	Carlos Rivera
2
2	Mario Domm	Jesse & Joy	Karol G	Sebastián Yatra

== Coaches' teams ==
- Winner
- Runner-up
- Third place
- Fourth place

Winners are in bold, finalists in finale listed first and stolen artists are in italicized font.

Season	Coaches and their finalists			
1	Wisin	Alejandra Guzmán	Luis Fonsi	Carlos Vives
1	Mayré Martínez; Yashira Rodriguez; Frances Dueñas; Ronny Mercedes; Johnny Bliss; Yalilenys Pérez; Brisila Barros; Stephanie Amaro	Dunia Ojeda; Kari Santoyo; Ruben Sandoval; Genesis Diaz; Adrianna Foster; Deanette Rivas; Verónica Rodríguez; Elvin Ramos	**Jeidimar Rijos**; Jerry Montañez; Abdiel Pacheco; Katherine Lopez; Raymundo Monge Jr. Ediberto Carmenatty; Elahim David; Francisco Gónzalez	Mava Gonzalez; Abel Flores; Sheniel Maisonet; Lluvia Vega; Yireh Pizarro; Paola Lebron; Ana Senko; Manny Cabo
2	Andrea Serrano; Albin St. Rose; Aaron Barrios; Lizette Rubio; Janine Rivera; Karen Galera; Gabriel Arredondo; Christine Marcelle	Sugeily Cardona; Julio Castillo; Jose Palacio; Alejandra Mor; Santiago Ramos; Steven Sibaja; Alexandra Carro	Jose Class; Emily Piriz; Rubi Mar Monge; Brian Cruz; Isai Reyes; Adrián Torres; Arturo Guerrero	**Sammy Colón**; Jimmy Rodriguez; Kayson Burgos; Diana Puentes; Jorge Franco; Michelle Raymon; Alonso Garcia

== Series overview ==
Season	Year aired	Winner	Runner-up	Third place	Fourth place	Winning coach	Hosts		Coaches (chairs' order)			
Season	Year aired	Winner	Runner-up	Third place	Fourth place	Winning coach	Main	Backstage	1	2	3	4
1	2019	Jeidimar Rijos	Mayré Martínez	Mava Gonzalez	Dunia Ojeda	Luis Fonsi	Jorge Bernal, Jacqueline Bracamontes	Jéssica Cediel	Wisin	Guzmán	Fonsi	Vives
2	2020	Sammy Colón	Jose Class	Sugeily Cardona	Andrea Serrano	Carlos Vives	Jorge Bernal, Jacqueline Bracamontes	Nastassja Bolívar	Wisin	Guzmán	Fonsi	Vives
3	2026	Upcoming season					Jorge Bernal, Jacqueline Bracamontes	Wendy Guevara	Alejandro	Laura	Guzmán	Manuel

== Season synopses ==
=== Season 1: 2019 ===
The first season of La Voz (U.S) premiered on January 13, 2019 and finished on April 21, 2019. The original coaching panel consists of Wisin, Alejandra Guzmán, Luis Fonsi and Carlos Vives. Jorge Bernal, Jacqueline Bracamontes and Jéssica Cediel appeared as the hosts. This season featured three stages: blind audition, battle round and live shows. On April 21, 2019, Jeidimar Rijos was announced as the winner from Team Luis Fonsi.

=== Season 2: 2020 ===
The second season of La Voz (U.S) on January 19, 2020, with returning coaches Wisin, Guzmán, Fonsi, and Vives as well as returning hosts Bernal and Bracamontes. Whereas, Nastassja Bolívar replaced Cediel as the new digital reporter. For the first time, the Comeback Stage was adapted giving the opportunity to unselected participants in the Blind Auditions to win a live show pass, coached by Mau y Ricky. The season’s finale was originally scheduled for April 26, 2020, but due to COVID-19 pandemic the Live Shows were rescheduled until further notice. On 16 August 2020, it announced that Sammy Colon is the winner of La Voz US winner from Team Carlos Vives.

== Ratings ==
Viewership and ratings per season of La Voz
Season	Timeslot (ET)	Episodes	First aired		Last aired		Avg. viewers (millions)
Season	Timeslot (ET)	Episodes	Date	Viewers (millions)	Date	Viewers (millions)	Avg. viewers (millions)
1	Sunday 9:00 p.m. (1–11); Sunday 8:30 p.m. (12–15)	15	January 13, 2019	1.38	April 21, 2019	1.44	1.37
2	Sunday 9:00 p.m.	15	January 19, 2020	1.04	August 16, 2020	0.89	1.03
