= Mitchie Rivera =

American songwriter (born 1997)

- Birth name: Michelle Rivera
- Born: July 28, 1997 (age 28) Miami, Florida, U.S.
- Genres: Pop
- Occupation: Songwriter
- Years active: 2020–present

Mitchie Rivera (born 28 July 1997, Miami, Florida) is an American pop songwriter.

== Early life and education ==
Mitchie Rivera's parents are Colombian immigrants. She completed her education at Berklee College of Music, graduating in 2017. Beyond her career as a music artist, Rivera also teaches singing, piano, and composition at 'Let it Beat!', a Miami-based music school. The school is owned by Guillermo Vadala and Nerina Nicotra.

== Musical career ==
Mitchie Rivera gained prominence in the music industry following her participation in the second season of La Voz US on Telemundo. Her performance there captured the attention of all four judges and led to collaborations with notable artists, including Luis Fonsi and Karol G.

Following this success, Rivera joined Arthouse Studios, where she worked under the guidance of producer Julio Reyes Copello. Her contributions at Arthouse included work on the soundtrack for Koati and collaborations with artists such as Catalina García of Monsieur Periné.

Rivera is currently managed by Hernán Orjuela.

== Awards and recognition ==
In 2023, Rivera received a nomination for the Best Pop Song at the Latin Grammys. This nomination was for her song 'Bailo pa ti,' a collaboration with Natalia Hernández and Julio Reyes Copello.
