= Emily Piriz =

American singer

- Born: Emily Marie Piriz; January 28, 1996 (age 30); Miami, Florida, United States
- Genres: Pop rock
- Occupation: Singer
- Instruments: Vocals, piano
- Years active: 2011–present

Emily Marie Piriz (born January 28, 1996) is an American singer from Miami, Florida, who finished in 12th place on the thirteenth season of American Idol in 2014. She was also a semi-finalist on the second season of La Voz in 2020. She also auditioned for the first season of The X Factor.

== American Idol ==
Episode	Theme	Song choice	Original artist	Result
Audition	Auditioner's Choice	"Mamma Knows Best"	Jessie J	Advanced
Hollywood Round, Part 1	A Capella	"Nothing but the Water"	Grace Potter and the Nocturnals	Advanced
Hollywood Round, Part 2	Group Performance	"Don't You Worry Child"	Swedish House Mafia	Advanced
Hollywood Round, Part 3	Solo	"Stars"	Grace Potter and the Nocturnals	Advanced
Top 31 (10 Women)	Personal Choice	"Paris (Ooh La La)"	Grace Potter and the Nocturnals	Advanced
Top 13	This Is Me	"Glitter in the Air"	Pink	Safe
Top 12	Home	"Let's Get Loud"	Jennifer Lopez	Eliminated

== Post-Idol ==
Piriz released her debut single, "One of Those Nights", on November 15, 2014. On February 13, 2019, she and David Diaz released a cover of "Like to Be You" (which was originally recorded by Shawn Mendes and Julia Michaels) as a single. She was a semi-finalist on the second season of La Voz.

== Discography ==
=== Singles ===
Year	Track	Album
2014	"One of Those Nights"	Non-album single
2021	"I Don't Wanna Be the One"	Non-album single

=== As featured artist ===
Year	Track	Album
2016	"Maze in my Mind" (Famous Last Words featuring Emily Piriz)	The Incubus
2019	"Like to Be You" (David Diaz featuring Emily Piriz)	Non-album single
