= La Voz Kids (American TV series) =

- Genre: Reality competition
- Created by: John de Mol Jr.
- Presented by: Jorge Bernal; Daisy Fuentes; Patricia Manterola
- Judges: Prince Royce; Paulina Rubio; Roberto Tapia; Natalia Jiménez; Pedro Fernández; Daddy Yankee
- Composer: Martijn Schimmer
- Country of origin: United States
- Original language: Spanish
- No. of seasons: 4
- No. of episodes: 52

Production
- Camera setup: Multi-camera

Original release
- Network: Telemundo
- Release: May 5, 2013 – July 10, 2016

Related
- The Voice (franchise); The Voice Kids (franchise); La Voz (American TV series)

La Voz Kids is a Spanish-language American singing competition television series that premiered May 5, 2013, on Telemundo. It formed part of the reality singing competition The Voice Kids' worldwide franchise, created by Dutch television producer John de Mol Jr. The show ran for four seasons between 2013 and 2016.

== Overview ==
In 2013, American Spanish-language network Telemundo (a subsidiary of NBCUniversal Television Group) introduced a children's version of The Voice in Spanish called La Voz Kids. It featured Spanish-speaking American children from 7 to 15 years of age. Prizes included $50,000 cash for their education and a recording contract with Universal Music Group. The show debuted on May 5, 2013, and is hosted by Jorge Bernal (from ¡Suelta La Sopa!) and Daisy Fuentes. The coaches in season one were Prince Royce, Paulina Rubio, and Roberto Tapia. The first season aired 13 episodes with the season finale airing on July 28, 2013.

Season two saw Natalia Jiménez replacing Paulina Rubio as one of the coaches. The other coaches and hosts remained the same.

For the show's third season, Daddy Yankee and Pedro Fernandez took Roberto Tapia and Prince Royce's place as the new coaches along with season two veteran Natalia Jiménez.

At their 2015 Upfronts, Telemundo announced that La Voz Kids would return for a fourth season, with all three Season 3 coaches returning.

== Coaches and hosts ==
The coaches in the first season were Prince Royce, Paulina Rubio and Roberto Tapia. In the second season, Natalia Jiménez replaced Paulina Rubio. For the show's third season, Daddy Yankee and Pedro Fernández took Roberto Tapia and Prince Royce's place as the new coaches along with season two veteran Natalia Jiménez. Coaches remained all the same for the fourth season. Roberto Tapia returned for the fourth season, but not as a coach anymore.

Seasons
Coach	1	2	3	4
Prince Royce				
Roberto Tapia				
Paulina Rubio				
Natalia Jiménez				
Daddy Yankee				
Pedro Fernández				

Coaches' gallery

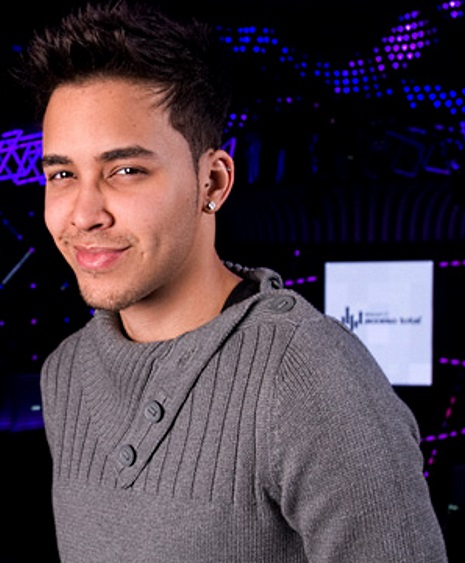
Prince Royce (2013–2014)

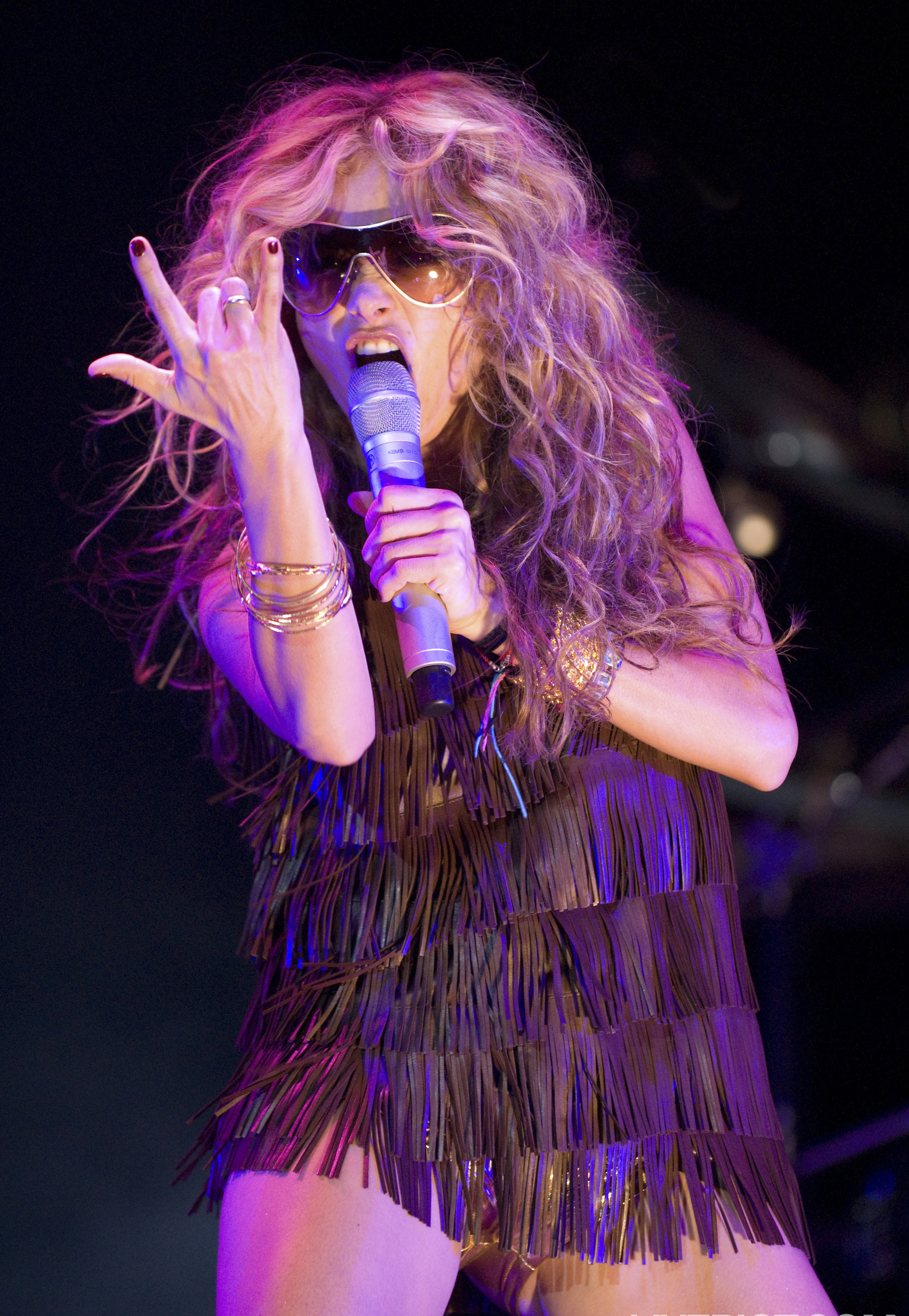
Paulina Rubio (2013)

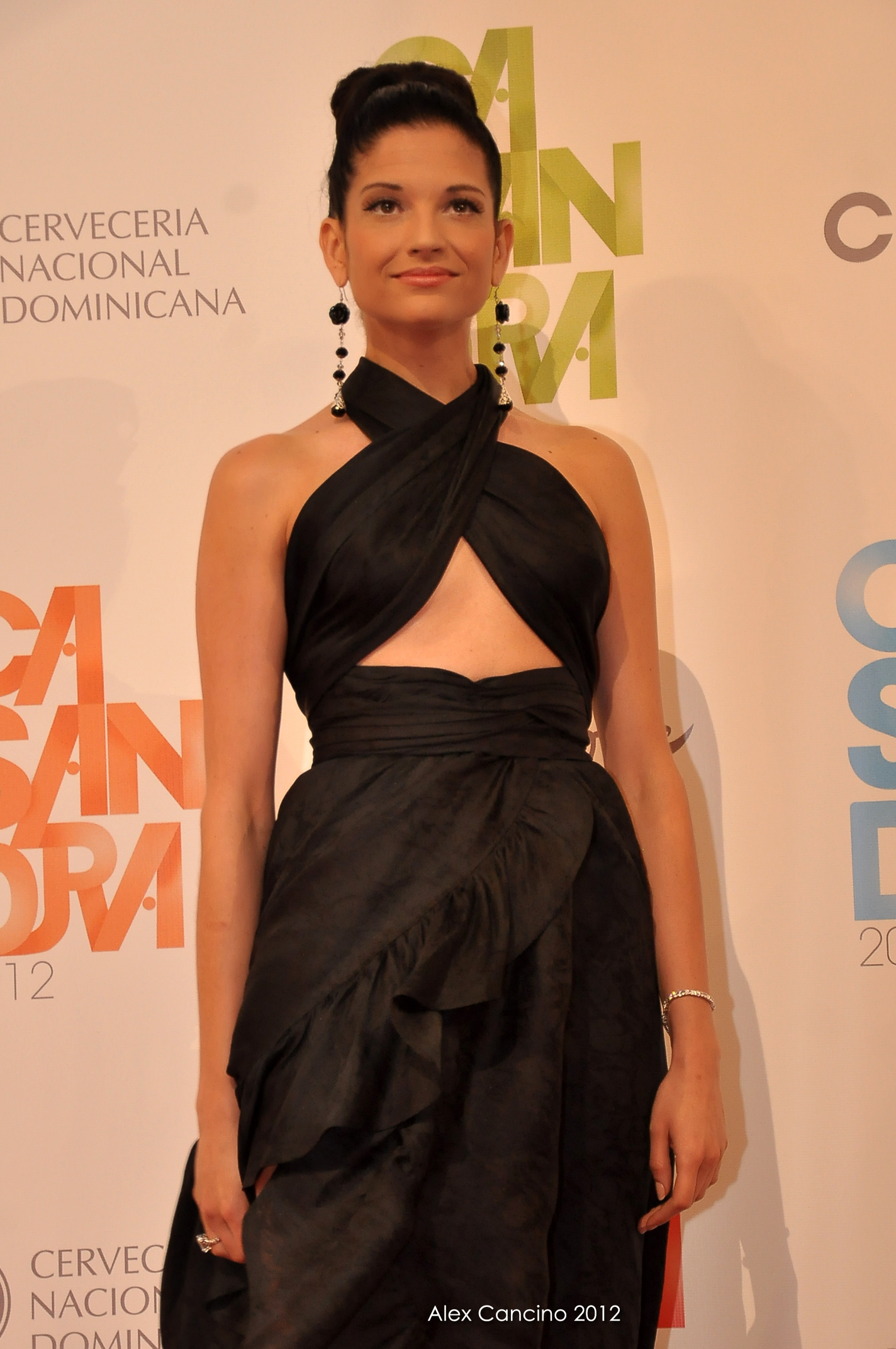
Natalia Jiménez (2014–2016)

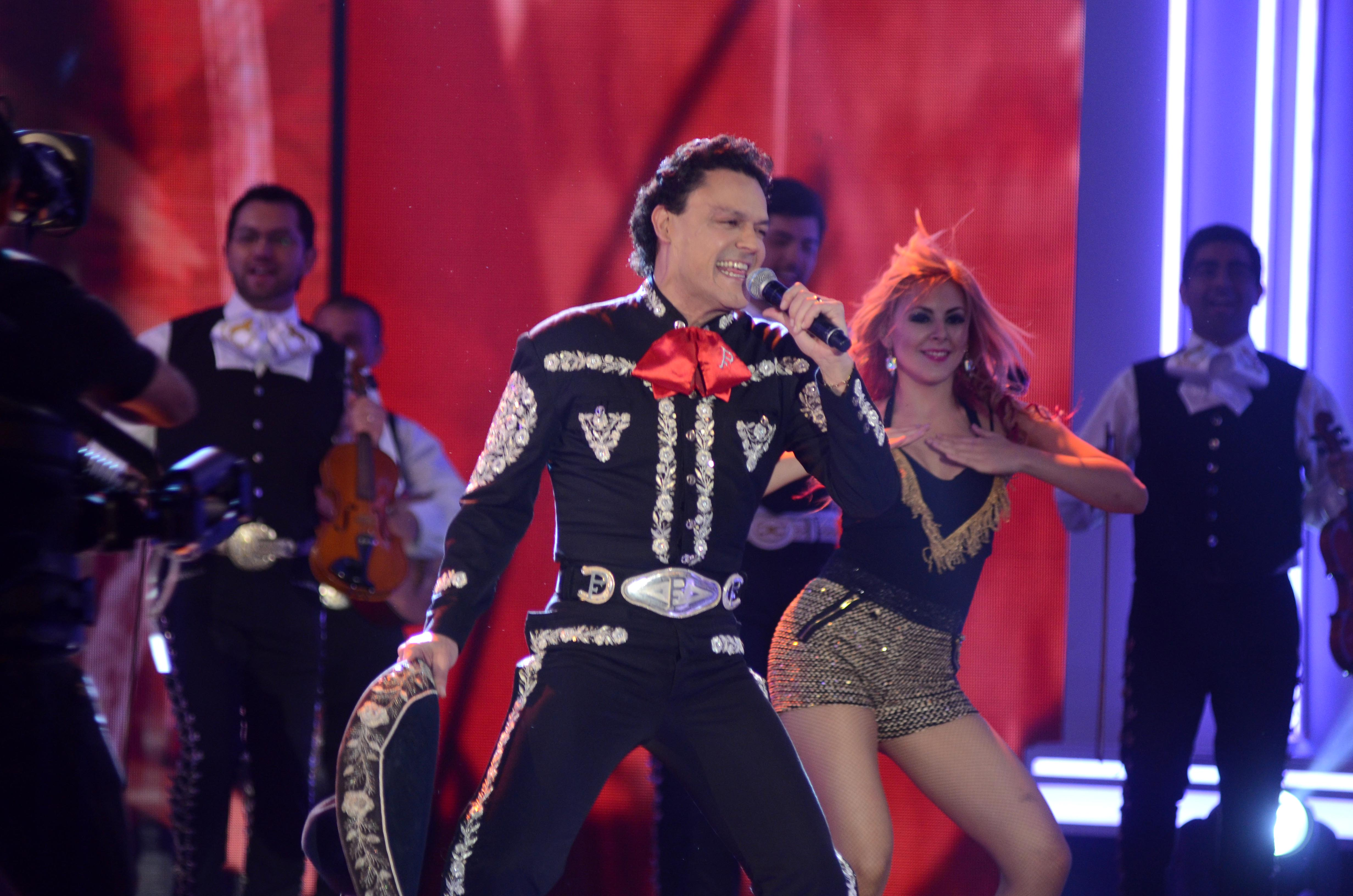
Pedro Fernández (2015–2016)

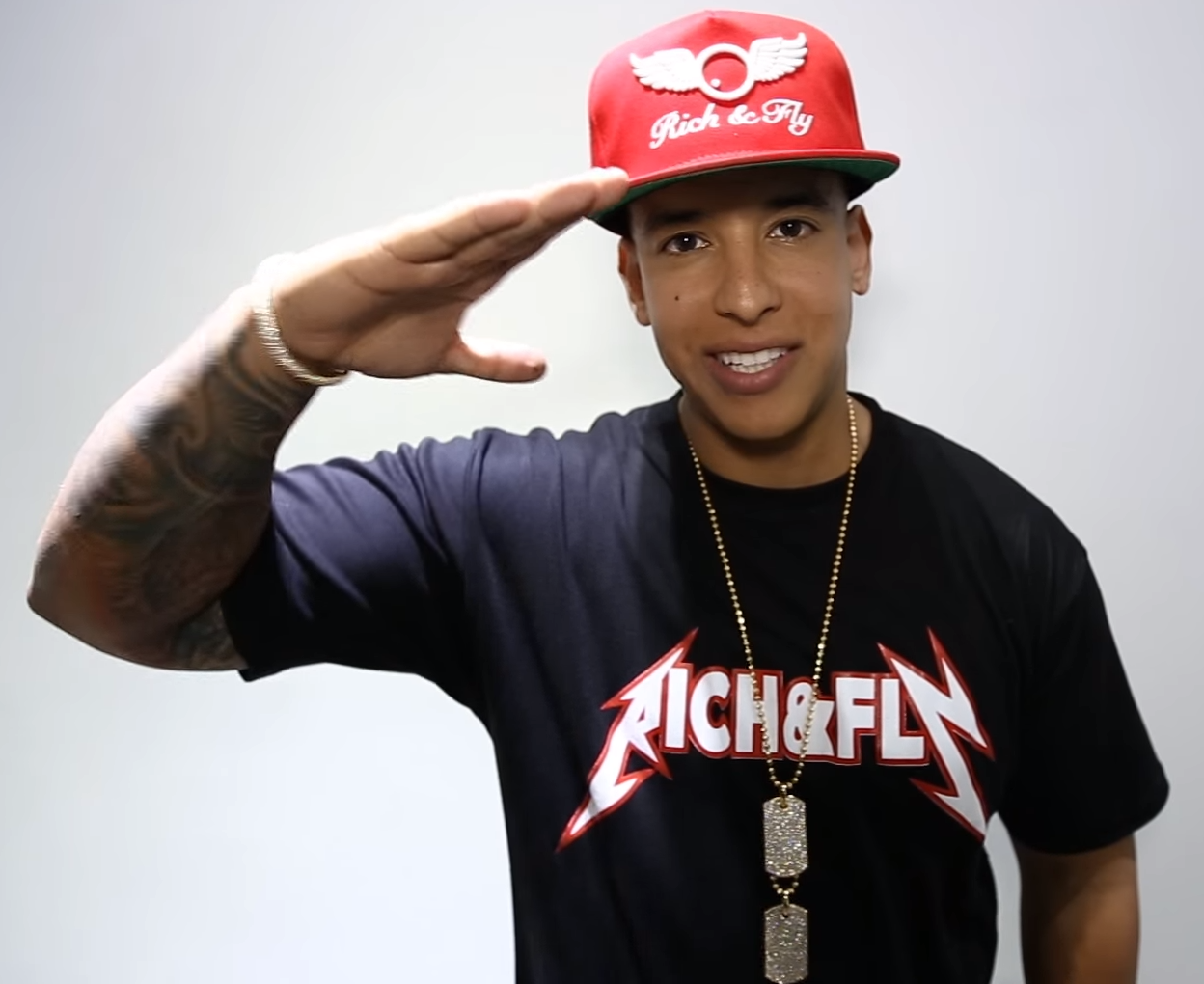
Daddy Yankee (2015–2016)

== Series overview ==
- Team Royce
- Team Paulina
- Team Roberto

- Team Yankee
- Team Natalia
- Team Pedro

Season	First aired	Last aired	Winner	Runners-up		Winning coach	Hosts		Coaches (chairs' order)		
Season	First aired	Last aired	Winner	Runners-up		Winning coach	Hosts		1	2	3
1	May 5, 2013	July 28, 2013	Paola Guanche	Alanis Gonzalez	Alan Ponce	Prince Royce	Daisy Fuentes	Jorge Bernal	Royce	Paulina	Roberto
2	March 16, 2014	June 8, 2014	Amanda Mena	Leslie Mendoza	Natalia Loya	Prince Royce	Daisy Fuentes	Jorge Bernal	Royce	Natalia	Roberto
3	March 15, 2015	June 7, 2015	Jonael Santiago	Franser Pazos	Shanty Zumaya	Natalia Jiménez	Daisy Fuentes	Jorge Bernal	Daddy Yankee	Natalia	Pedro
4	April 17, 2016	July 10, 2016	Christopher Rivera	Alejandra Gallardo	Axel Cabrera	Natalia Jiménez	Patricia Manterola	Jorge Bernal	Daddy Yankee	Natalia	Pedro
