= Sebastián Yatra discography =

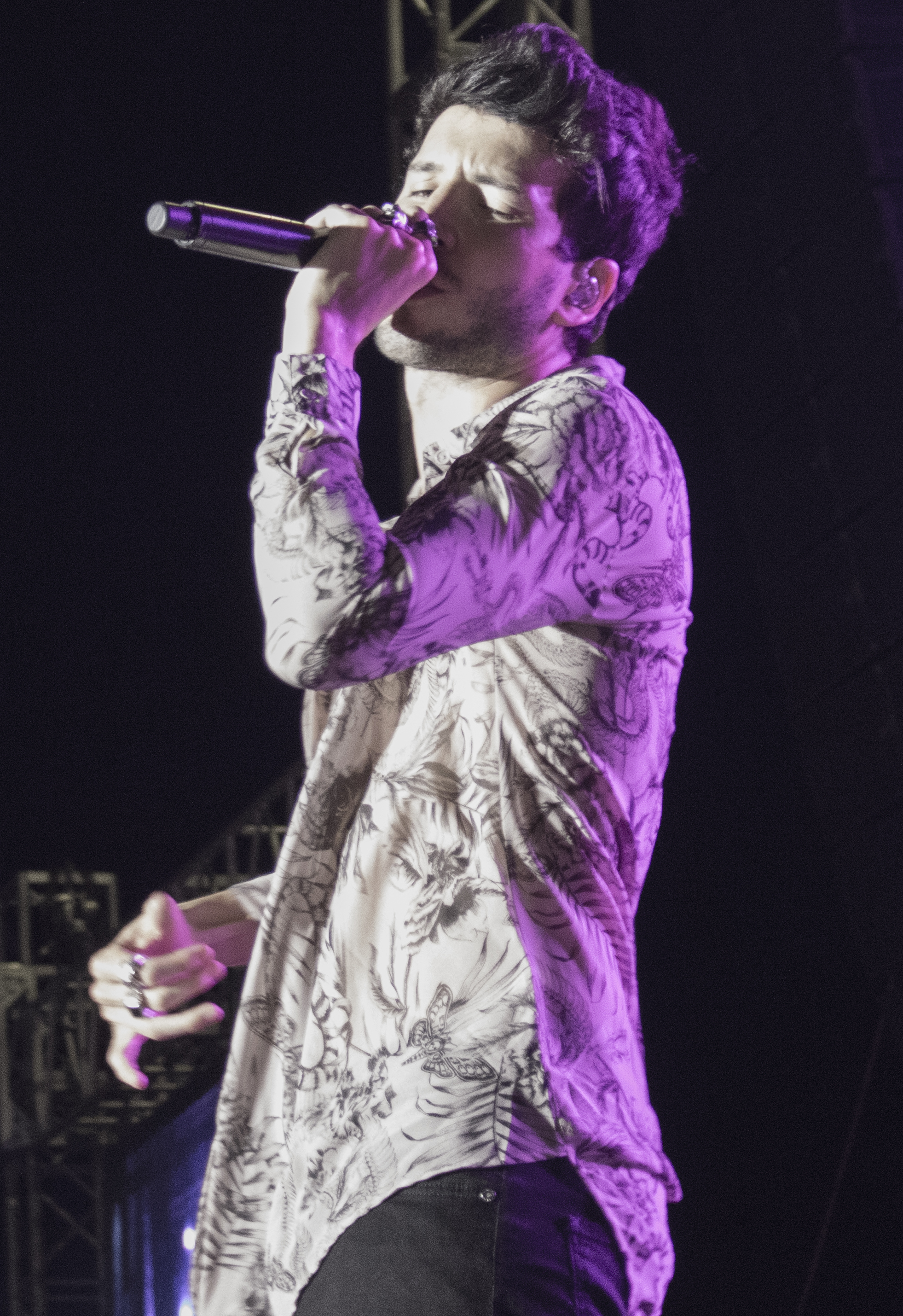
- Yatra in 2018
- Studio albums: 3
- EPs: 1
- Singles: 59
- Mixtapes: 1
- Promotional singles: 8

The discography of Colombian recording artist Sebastián Yatra consists of four studio albums, one extended play, one mixtape, fifty-seven singles (including five as a featured artist) and eight promotional singles.

== Albums ==
=== Studio albums ===
List of studio albums with selected details
Title	Album details	Peak chart positions						Certifications
Title	Album details	ARG	MEX	SPA	US	US Latin	US Latin Pop	Certifications
Mantra	Released: May 18, 2018; Label: Universal Music Latino; Formats: CD, digital download, streaming	1	2	22	192	3	1	AMPROFON: Diamond+2× Platinum+Gold; CAPIF: Platinum; IFPI CHI: 3× Platinum; RIAA: 2× Platinum (Latin)
Fantasía	Released: April 12, 2019; Label: Universal Music Latino; Formats: CD, digital download streaming	5	2	4	—	5	1	AMPROFON: 3× Platinum; RIAA: Platinum (Latin)
Dharma	Released: January 28, 2022; Label: Universal Music Latino; Formats: CD, digital download, streaming	—	—	1	—	13	2	AMPROFON: 4× Platinum+Gold; PROMUSICAE: Platinum; RIAA: 5× Platinum (Latin)
Milagro	Released: May 16, 2025; Label: Universal Music Latino; Formats: CD, digital download, streaming	—	—	10	—	—	9	RIAA: Platinum (Latin)
"—" denotes a title that was not released or did not chart in that territory.

=== Mixtapes ===
List of mixtapes with selected details
Title	Mixtape details
The Mixtape JukeBox, Vol. 1	Released: May 24, 2016; Label: Roberto Andrade Dirak Entertainment; Format: Digital download, streaming

== Extended plays ==
List of extended plays with selected details
Title	Extended play details
Extended Play Yatra	Released: May 26, 2017; Label: Universal Music Latino; Format: Digital download, streaming

== Singles ==
=== As lead artist ===
List of singles as lead artist, with selected chart positions and certifications, showing year released and album name
Title	Year	Peak chart positions									Certifications	Album
Title	Year	COL	ARG	ECU	MEX	SPA	SWI	US	US Latin	US Latin Pop	Certifications	Album
"El Psicólogo"	2013	—	—	46	—	—	—	—	—	—		Non-album singles
"Todo Lo Que Siento"	2014	—	—	—	—	—	—	—	—	—		Non-album singles
"Love You Forever"	2014	—	—	—	—	—	—	—	—	—		Non-album singles
"Para Olvidar"	2014	—	—	—	—	—	—	—	—	—		Extended Play Yatra
"No Me Llames" (solo or featuring Alkilados)	2015	—	—	—	—	—	—	—	—	—		Non-album single
"Cómo Mirarte"	2015	—	—	21	—	—	—	—	—	—	PROMUSICAE: Gold	Extended Play Yatra
"Que Tengo Que Hacer" (featuring Feid)	2016	—	—	—	—	—	—	—	—	—		The Mixtape JukeBox, Vol. 1
"Lo Que Siento por Ti" (featuring Karol G)	2016	—	—	—	—	—	—	—	—	—		The Mixtape JukeBox, Vol. 1
"Traicionera"	2016	1	4	5	12	1	—	—	26	23	AMPROFON: 2× Diamond+3× Platinum+Gold; CAPIF: 2× Platinum; FIMI: Platinum; PROMUSICAE: 5× Platinum; RIAA: 2× Diamond (24× Platinum) (Latin)	Extended Play Yatra and Mantra
"Alguien Robó" (featuring Wisin and Nacho)	2017	2	17	2	24	22	—	—	31	25	AMPROFON: 2× Platinum; CAPIF: Gold; PROMUSICAE: 2× Platinum; RIAA: 2× Platinum (Latin)	Extended Play Yatra and Mantra
"No Vacancy" (Latin Version) (with OneRepublic)	2017	—	—	48	—	70	—	—	—	—		Non-album single
"Devuélveme el Corazón"	2017	15	72	4	39	—	—	—	—	—		Mantra
"Summer Days" (with Milow)	2017	—	—	—	—	—	—	—	—	—		Non-album single
"Robarte un Beso" (with Carlos Vives)	2017	1	2	3	3	16	—	— (Note: "Robarte un Beso" did not enter the Billboard Hot 100, but peaked at number 21 on the Bubbling Under Hot 100 chart.)	13	4	AMPROFON: Diamond+4× Platinum+Gold; FIMI: Gold; PROMUSICAE: 4× Platinum; RIAA: 3× Diamond (Latin)	Mantra and Vives
"Suena El Dembow" (with Joey Montana)	2017	31	6	2	35	6	—	—	15	20	AMPROFON: 2× Platinum+Gold; PROMUSICAE: 2× Platinum; RIAA: Gold (Latin)	La Movida
"Sutra" (featuring Dalmata)	2017	4	— (Note: "Sutra" did not enter the Argentina Top 20, but peaked at No. 17 on the Argentina Latin Airplay chart.)	1	16	17	—	—	26	8	AMPROFON: Gold; PROMUSICAE: Platinum; RIAA: Platinum (Latin)	Mantra
"Te Lo Pido Por Favor" (with Alejandro González)	2017	—	—	—	—	—	—	—	—	—		Non-album singles
"Ave María" (with Lafame)	2017	—	—	—	—	—	—	—	—	—		Non-album singles
"No Hay Nadie Más"	2018	4	28	2	—	65	—	—	—	—	AMPROFON: Diamond+Gold; PROMUSICAE: Gold	Mantra
"A Partir De Hoy" (with David Bisbal)	2018	9	36	1	15	7	—	—	—	32	AMPROFON: Gold; PROMUSICAE: 2× Platinum; RIAA: 2× Platinum (Latin)	En Tus Planes
"Por Perro" (with Luis Figueroa featuring Lary Over)	2018	2	—	10	21	28	—	—	27	16	AMPROFON: 4× Platinum; PROMUSICAE: Platinum; RIAA: 4× Platinum (Latin)	Mantra
"Love" (with Gianluca Vacchi)	2018	29	—	—	—	—	—	—	—	—	FIMI: Gold	Mantra
"Yo Te Vine a Amar" (with Ivete Sangalo)	2018	—	—	45	—	—	—	—	—	—		Ivete Sangalo Live Experience
"My Only One (No Hay Nadie Más)" (with Isabela Merced)	2018	35^{1}	18	18^{1}	—	—	—	—	—	—		Non-album single
"Quiero Volver" (with TINI)	2018	—	21	49	41	—	—	—	—	—	CUD: Gold	Quiero Volver
"Ya No Tiene Novio" (with Mau y Ricky)	2018	5	2	16	16	27	—	—	12	1	AMPROFON: 2× Diamond; PMB: Gold; PROMUSICAE: Platinum	Para Aventuras y Curiosidades
"Contigo Siempre" (with Alejandro Fernandez)	2018	—	—	25	9	—	—	—	—	—		Non-album single
"Vuelve" (with Beret)	2018	45	31	96	—	26	—	—	—	—	AMPROFON: Platinum; PROMUSICAE: Gold	Fantasía
"Atado Entre Tus Manos" (with Tommy Torres)	2018	—	—	44	—	—	—	—	—	33		Fantasía
"Ni Gucci Ni Prada (Remix)" (with Kenny Man)	2018	19	—	—	—	—	—	—	—	—		Non-album single
"Un Año" (with Reik)	2019	14	4	1	6	6	—	—	12	4	AMPROFON: Diamond+2× Platinum; PROMUSICAE: 2× Platinum; RIAA: 4× Platinum (Latin)	Fantasía
"Déjate Querer" (with Lalo Ebratt and Yera)	2019	33	—	27	—	16	—	—	—	—	PROMUSICAE: 2× Platinum	Non-album single
"Cristina"	2019	11	14	38	10	25	—	—	—	30	AMPROFON: 2× Platinum+Gold; PROMUSICAE: Gold	Fantasía
"Date La Vuelta" (with Luis Fonsi and Nicky Jam)	2019	64	25	5	37	23	27	—	31	1	PROMUSICAE: Platinum	Non-album single
"En Guerra" (with Camilo)	2019	—	—	—	—	—	—	—	—	—		Fantasía
"En Cero" (with Yandel and Manuel Turizo)	2019	—	—	—	—	70	—	—	—	17	RIAA: Platinum (Latin)	Non-album single
"Runaway" (with Daddy Yankee and Natti Natasha featuring Jonas Brothers)	2019	3	13	—	4	29	96	— (Note: "Runaway" did not enter the Billboard Hot 100, but peaked at number 11 on the Bubbling Under Hot 100 chart.)	12	3	AMPROFON: Diamond+2× Platinum; PROMUSICAE: Gold; RIAA: 7× Platinum (Latin)	Dharma
"Bonita" (with Juanes)	2019	1	22	9	5	71	—	—	26	1	AMPROFON: Gold; RIAA: Gold (Latin)	Más Futuro Que Pasado
"Oye" (with Tini)	2019	—	3	1	—	72	—	—	—	—	ASINCOL: Platinum; CAPIF: Platinum; IFPI ECU: Platinum; IFPI PER: 2× Platinum	Tini Tini Tini
"Mañana No Hay Clase (24/7)" (featuring Ñejo & Dalmata)	2019	39	93	59	— (Note: "Mañana No Hay Clase (24/7)" did not enter the Billboard Mexico Airplay chart, but peaked at number 42 on the Mexico Pop Espanol Airplay chart.)	—	—	—	—	31		Non-album singles
"No Ha Parado de Llover" (with Maná)	2019	—	—	—	13	—	—	—	—	23		Non-album singles
"Boomshakalaka" (with Dimitri Vegas & Like Mike and Afro Bros featuring Camilo and Emilia)	2019	—	—	32	—	—	—	—	—	—		Non-album singles
"Magnetic" (with Monsta X)	2019	—	—	—	—	—	—	—	—	—		Non-album singles
"TBT" (with Rauw Alejandro and Manuel Turizo)	2020	18	29	2	—	39	—	—	16	1	AMPROFON: Platinum; PROMUSICAE: Platinum; RIAA: 3× Platinum (Latin)	Dharma
"Falta Amor" (with Ricky Martin)	2020	80	48	4	47	—	—	—	—	19	RIAA: Platinum (Latin)	Fantasía
"Locura" (with Cali y El Dandee)	2020	6	24	—	— (Note: "Locura" did not enter the Billboard Mexico Airplay chart, but peaked at number 24 on the Mexico Pop Espanol Airplay chart.)	39	—	—	—	7	AMPROFON: Platinum; PROMUSICAE: Gold; RIAA: Gold (Latin)	Colegio
"Bajo la mesa" (with Morat)	2020	—	—	—	6	52	—	—	—	—	2× AMPROFON: Platinum	A Dónde Vamos
"No Bailes Sola" (with Danna Paola)	2020	14	23	16	—	—	—	—	—	—	AMPROFON: Platinum; RIAA: Platinum (Latin)	K.O.
"A Donde Van" (featuring Alvaro Diaz)	2020	—	84	—	7	15	—	—	—	10	AMPROFON: Gold; RIAA: Gold (Latin)	Dharma
"Corazón Sin Vida" (with Aitana)	2020	—	74	—	—	4	—	—	—	—	AMPROFON: Platinum; IFPI ECU: Gold; PROMUSICAE: Platinum	11 Razones
"Chica Ideal" (with Guaynaa)	2020	4	8	2	8	10	—	—	13	1	AMPROFON: Diamond; PROMUSICAE: 3× Platinum; RIAA: 4× Platinum (Latin)	Dharma
"Santa Claus Is Comin' to Town"	2020	—	—	—	—	76	—	—	21	—	RIAA: Gold (Latin)	Non-album single
"Adiós"	2021	20	92	—	7	100	—	—	—	—		Dharma
"Pareja del Año" (with Myke Towers)	2021	2	2	2	9	1	—	— (Note: "Pareja del Año" did not enter the Billboard Hot 100, but peaked at number 16 on the Bubbling Under Hot 100 chart.)	10	1	AMPROFON: Diamond+Platinum+Gold; PROMUSICAE: 6× Platinum; RIAA: 8× Platinum (Latin)	Dharma
"3 de la Mañana" (with Mau y Ricky and Mora)	2021	9	35	—	33	—	—	—	—	16		Non-album singles
"Delincuente" (with Jhay Cortez)	2021	75	—	—	—	94	—	—	—	—		Non-album singles
"Tarde"	2021	—	—	—	—	—	—	—	—	—		Dharma
"Tacones Rojos"	2021	1	7	1	3	2	—	— (Note: "Tacones Rojos" did not enter the Billboard Hot 100, but peaked at number 21 on the Bubbling Under Hot 100 chart.)	12	1	AMPROFON: Gold; PROMUSICAE: 10× Platinum; RIAA: 12× Platinum (Latin)	Dharma
"Dos Oruguitas"	2021	92	—	—	—	—	—	36	2	—	BPI: Silver; MC: Platinum; RIAA: Platinum	Encanto
"Amor Pasajero"	2022	2	81	10	—	83	—	—	—	—		Dharma
"Regresé" (with Justin Quiles and L-Gante)	2022	—	60	—	—	—	—	—	—	—		Dharma
"Melancólicos Anónimos"	2022	—	61	—	28	76	—	—	—	—		Dharma
"Dharma" (with Jorge Celedón and Rosario)	2022	—	—	—	—	73	—	—	—	—		Dharma
"Las Dudas" (with Aitana)	2022	—	—	—	—	92	—	—	—	—		Dharma
"TV"	2022	—	77	—	—	—	—	—	—	—		Dharma +
"Contigo" (with Pablo Alborán)	2022	—	56	—	—	—	—	—	—	—		Dharma +
"Ojos Marrones" (with Lasso)	2022	—	—	—	—	88	—	—	—	—		Eva
"Una Noche Sin Pensar"	2023	—	57	—	—	66	—	—	—	—	PROMUSICAE: 2× Platinum; RIAA: Platinum (Latin)	Non-album singles
"Vagabundo" (with Manuel Turizo and Beéle)	2023	—	—	—	—	3	—	—	—	—	PROMUSICAE: 9× Platinum; RIAA: 8× Platinum (Latin)	Non-album singles
"XQ Sigues Pasando :(" (with Abraham Mateo)	2023	—	—	—	—	68	—	—	—	—		Non-album singles
"Energía Bacana"	2023	—	—	—	—	31	—	—	—	—	PROMUSICAE: Platinum; RIAA: Platinum (Latin)	Non-album singles
"Los Domingos"	2024	—	89	—	—	—	—	—	—	—		TBA
"2AM" (with Bad Gyal)	2024	—	85	—	—	18	—	—	—	—		TBA
"—" denotes a title that was not released or did not chart in that territory.

Notes

- Note 1: Uses combined chart entries for "No Hay Nadie Más" and "No Hay Nadie Más (My Only One)"

=== As featured artist ===
List of singles as featured artist, with selected chart positions and certifications, showing year released and album name
Title	Year	Peak chart positions					Certifications	Album
Title	Year	ARG	ECU	MEX	SPA	US Latin	Certifications	Album
"Por Fin Te Encontré" (Cali & El Dandee featuring Juan Magán and Sebastián Yatra)	2015	—	9	45	1	47	FIMI: Gold; PROMUSICAE: 4× Platinum; RIAA: 5× Platinum (Latin)	Non-album single
"Ya No Hay Nadie Que Nos Pare" (TINI featuring Sebastián Yatra)	2016	— (Note: "Ya No Hay Nadie Que Nos Pare" did not enter the Argentina Top 20, but peaked at number 6 on the Argentina National Songs chart.)	—	—	—	—		TINI (Martina Stoessel)
"Ya Ya Ya" (Mickael Carreira featuring Sebastián Yatra)	2017	—	—	—	—	—		Instinto
"Edge of the Night" (Spanish Version) (Sheppard featuring Sebastián Yatra)	2017	—	—	—	—	—		Non-album single
"Elita" (Gary Barlow featuring Michael Bublé and Sebastián Yatra)	2020	—	—	—	—	—		Music Played by Humans
"Til You're Home" (Rita Wilson featuring Sebastián Yatra)	2022	—	—	—	—	—		A Man Called Otto (Original Motion Picture Soundtrack)
"—" denotes a title that was not released or did not chart in that territory.

=== Promotional singles ===
List of promotional singles, showing year released and album name
Title	Year	Album
"Si Esto No Se Llama Amor"	2016	The Mixtape JukeBox, Vol. 1
"Déjate Amar"	2016	The Mixtape JukeBox, Vol. 1
"Dime" (featuring Pasabordo)	2016	The Mixtape JukeBox, Vol. 1
"Below Zero"	2016	The Mixtape JukeBox, Vol. 1
"Te Regalo"	2017	Extended Play Yatra
"Aquí Estaré"	2018	Fantasía
"Falta Amor"	2019	Fantasía
"Fantasía"	2019	Fantasía
