= Mau y Ricky discography =

- Studio albums: 3
- EPs: 2
- Singles: 19

The discography of Venezuelan-American duo Mau y Ricky consists of two studio albums, one extended play and nineteen singles (including three as featured artist).

== Albums ==
=== Studio albums ===
Title	Studio album details	Peaks		Certifications
Title	Studio album details	US Latin	US Latin Pop	Certifications
Para Aventuras y Curiosidades	Released: May 3, 2019; Label: Sony Music Latin; Format: CD, digital download	22	5	AMPROFON: Gold; RIAA: Platinum (Latin)
Rifresh	Released: November 20, 2020; Label: Sony Music Latin; Format: CD, digital download	—	—	
Hotel Caracas	Released: May 31, 2024; Label: Why Club Records; Format: Digital download, streaming			

=== Mixtapes ===
Title	Mixtape details
Desgenerados Mixtape	Released: July 20, 2023; Label: Why Club, Warner Latina, Sony Latin; Format: Digital download, streaming

== Extended plays ==
Title	Details
Arte	Released: May 19, 2017; Label: Sony Latin; Format: Digital download
La Llave	Released: August 28, 2025; Label: Why Club Records; Format: Digital download, streaming

== Singles ==
=== As lead artist ===
Title	Year	Peak chart positions										Certifications	Album
Title	Year	VEN	ARG	COL	ECU	MEX	SPA	URU	US Latin	US Latin Airplay	US Latin Pop	Certifications	Album
"Hoy"	2011	—	—	—	—	—	—	—	—	—	—		Non-album single
"Preguntas"	2013	—	—	—	—	—	—	—	—	—	—		Non-album single
"Iré tras de ti"	2014	—	—	—	—	—	—	—	—	—	—		Non-album single
"Voy Que Quemo"	2016	—	—	—	—	—	—	—	—	—	—		Non-album single
"Para Olvidarte"	2016	—	—	—	—	—	—	—	—	—	—		Arte
"Mi Mala" (with Karol G)	2017	—	—	—	—	—	68	—	—	—	—	AMPROFON: 2× Platinum+Gold; ASINCOL: Gold; CAPIF: Gold; RIAA: 3× Platinum (Latin)	Para Aventuras y Curiosidades
"Mi Mala (Remix)" (with Karol G featuring Becky G, Leslie Grace and Lali)	2018	30	10	68	15	—	57	8	38	33	21	AMPROFON: Platinum+Gold; CAPIF: Gold; PROMUSICAE: Gold; UNIMPRO: 4× Platinum	Para Aventuras y Curiosidades
"Bailoteame" (with Agustín Casanova and Abraham Mateo)	2018	—	—	—	—	—	—	8	—	—	—		Non-album single
"22"	2018	—	—	—	32	—	—	—	—	—	—		Para Aventuras y Curiosidades
"Ya No Tiene Novio" (with Sebastián Yatra)	2018	19	2	5	16	16	27	2	12	1	1	AMPROFON: 2× Diamond; PROMUSICAE: Platinum	Para Aventuras y Curiosidades
"Desconocidos" (with Manuel Turizo and Camilo)	2018	5	10	2	15	31	25	—	31	40	21	ASINCOL: Platinum; AMPROFON: 2× Diamond; UNIMPRO: 2× Platinum; PROMUSICAE: Platinum; RIAA: 11× Platinum (Latin)	Para Aventuras y Curiosidades
"Aventura" (with V-One)	2018	—	64	—	—	—	—	—	—	—	—		Non-album single
"Faldita" (with Leslie Shaw)	2019	—	—	31	78	—	—	—	—	—	—	UNIMPRO: 4× Platinum	Yo Soy Leslie Shaw
"Anda Pal Carajo (APC)" (with XAXO and Rudy Mancuso)	2019	—	—	—	—	—	—	—	—	—	—		MMXX - EP
"La Boca" (with Camilo)	2019	—	6	5	6	32	51	5	—	—	—	AMPROFON: Diamond+2× Platinum+Gold; CAPIF: Gold; RIAA: 6× Platinum (Latin)	Para Aventuras y Curiosidades
"Cariño Mío" (with Chyno Miranda)	2019	1	—	—	—	—	—	—	—	—	—		Cariño Mío
"Bota Fuego" (with Nicky Jam)	2019	13	72	33	70	—	—	—	—	—	—	AMPROFON: Gold	Desgenerados Mixtape
"Recuerdo" (with Tini)	2020	—	12	—	15	—	—	9	—	—	—		Tini Tini Tini
"Ya Tú Me Conoces" (with Thalía)	2020	16	—	—	65	34	—	—	—	—	30		Desamorfosis
"Sigo Buscándote" (with Ovy on the Drums)	2020	— (Note: "Sigo Buscándote" did not enter the Monitor Latino Venezuela Airplay chart, but peaked at number 15 on the Venezuela Pop Airplay chart.)	41	45	28	39	—	—	—	—	28	RIAA: Gold (Latin)	Non-album singles
"Qué Dirías?"	2020	—	—	—	—	— (Note: "Qué Dirías?" did not enter the Billboard Mexico Airplay chart, but peaked at number 18 on the Mexico Espanol Airplay chart.)	—	—	—	—	—		Desgenerados mixtape
"Me Enamora"	2020	—	—	3	—	7	—	—	—	—	—	AMPROFON: Gold	Desgenerados mixtape
"Una y Mil Veces" (with MYA)	2020	—	96	—	—	—	—	—	—	—	—		Suena MYA!
"Mente" (with Dylan Fuentes and Tainy)	2020	—	—	—	—	—	—	—	—	—	—		Non-album singles
"Papás"	2020	— (Note: "Papás" did not enter the Monitor Latino Venezuela Airplay chart, but peaked at number four on the Venezuela Pop Airplay chart.)	7	—	7	13	—	7	—	41	7	RIAA: Platinum (Latin)	Rifresh
"La Grosera"	2020	—	75	—	—	— (Note: "La Grosera" did not enter the Billboard Mexico Airplay chart, but peaked at number 22 on the Mexico Espanol Airplay chart.)	—	—	—	—	—		Rifresh
"Calmarme II" (with Amenazzy and Yandel)	2020	—	—	—	—	—	—	—	—	—	19		Non-album singles
"Ouch"	2020	—	82	—	—	26	—	—	—	46	10		Rifresh
"Amén" (with Ricardo Montaner, Camilo and Evaluna Montaner)	2020	—	46	—	—	48	—	—	—	—	15		Fe
"Doctor" (with JonTheProducer, Prince Royce and Piso 21)	2021	—	—	—	—	40	—	—	—	—	18		Non-album singles
"Despiértate" (with Cali y El Dandee and Guaynaa)	2021	—	—	—	—	—	—	—	—	—	—		Malibú
"Hijos Contigo" (with Lérica)	2021	—	—	—	—	—	—	—	—	—	—		Cocoterapia
"Malo" (with Matisse)	2021	—	—	—	—	—	—	—	—	—	—		Non-album singles
"3 de la Mañana" (with Sebastián Yatra and Mora)	2021	—	35	9	26	33	—	—	—	—	16	CAPIF: Gold	Desgenerados mixtape
"La Boca Junta" (with Melendi)	2021	—	—	—	—	30	90	—	—	—	22		Likes y Cicatrices
"Besos en Cualquier Horario" (with Carlos Vives and Lucy Vives)	2021	1	56	1	1	26	—	15	—	34	10		Cumbiana II
"Mal Acostumbrao" (with María Becerra)	2021	—	4	—	—	25	—	— (Note: "Mal Acostumbrao" did not enter the Monitor Latino Top 20 Uruguay airplay chart, but peaked at number seven on the Uruguayan Chamber of Disc's monthly digital singles chart.)	—	—	—	CAPIF: 2× Platinum	Desgenerados mixtape
"Cachito" (with Danna Paola)	2021	—	—	—	—	—	—	—	—	—	—		Non-album singles
"Prende La Cámara (Remix)" (with FMK and Tiago PZK)	2021	—	—	—	—	—	—	—	—	—	—		Non-album singles
"Flaca" (with Sael)	2021	—	74	—	—	—	—	—	—	—	—		Non-album singles
"No Puede Ser" (with Eladio Carrion)	2022	—	54	—	—	2	—	—	—	—	22		Desgenerados mixtape
"Llorar y Llorar" (with Carin León)	2022	—	—	—	—	39	—	—	29	1	1	RIAA: Platinum (Latin)	Desgenerados mixtape
"La Chama" (with Micro TDH)	2022	—	—	—	—	—	—	—	—	—	—		Non-album singles
"No Hace Falta Que Lo Digas" (with Alejandro Lerner)	2022	—	—	—	—	—	—	—	—	—	—		Non-album singles
"Miami"	2023	—	—	—	—	—	—	—	—	—	—		Desgenerados mixtape
"Manos Frías" (with Reik and Beéle)	2023	1	—	—	—	—	—	—	—	—	19		Desgenerados mixtape
"No Es Normal" (with Jay Wheeler)	2023	—	—	—	—	—	—	—	—	—	—		Desgenerados mixtape
"Ex" (with La Joaqui)	2023	1	—	—	—	—	—	—	—	—	—		Desgenerados mixtape
"Vas a Destrozarme"	2023	7	—	—	—	—	—	—	—	—	—		Hotel Caracas
"Pasado Mañana"	2024												Hotel Caracas
"Gran Día" (with Guaynaa)	2024												Hotel Caracas
"Bilingües" (with Lasso)	2024												Malcriado
"Home Alone" (with Rawayana)	2024												Non-album single
"Libélulas"	2024												La Llave
"Noche de Luna" (with Lagos)	2025												La Llave
"Bonito" (with Zulia)	2025												Non-album singles
"Spoiler: Sale Mal" (with Michelle Maciel)	2025												Non-album singles
"Samaná" (with Danny Ocean and Yorghaki)	2025												La Llave
"Voltaje" (with Boza)	2025												La Llave
"Desmaquillada"	2025												La Llave
"Chamba" (with Hamilton and Daramola)	2025												Non-album single
"Tocando Madera" (with Luísa Sonza and Big One)	2025												TBA
"—" denotes a recording that did not chart or was not released in that territory.

=== As featured artist ===
Title	Year	Peaks								Certifications	Album
Title	Year	ARG	CHI Pop	ECU Pop	MEX	NIC Pop	PAR Pop	SPA	URU	Certifications	Album
"Qué Tienes Tú" (Dvicio featuring Jesús Reik and Mau y Ricky)	2018	—	—	—	16	—	—	28	—	PROMUSICAE: Platinum	Qué Tienes Tú
"Sin Querer Queriendo" (Lali featuring Mau y Ricky)	2018	14	17	87	—	15	16	—	13		Brava
"Esto No Es Sincero" (Adexe & Nau featuring Mau y Ricky)	2018	—	—	—	—	—	—	—	—		Binomio Perfecto
"—" denotes a recording that did not chart or was not released in that territory.

=== Promotional singles ===
Title	Year	Peaks			Certifications	Album
Title	Year	VEN	ECU	MEX Pop	Certifications	Album
"Mal de La Cabeza" (with Becky G)	2018	82	83	—		Para Aventuras y Curiosidades
"Japonesa"	2018	—	—	—		Para Aventuras y Curiosidades
"Perdóname"	2019	—	—	45	AMPROFON: Gold	Para Aventuras y Curiosidades
"—" denotes a recording that did not chart or was not released in that territory.

== Other appearances ==
Title	Year	Other artist(s)	Album
"Me Acostumbré"	2019	Becky G	Mala Santa
"No Puedo Olvidarte"	2020	Lali	Libra
