= Jacqueline Bracamontes =

Mexican actress, model and beauty pageant

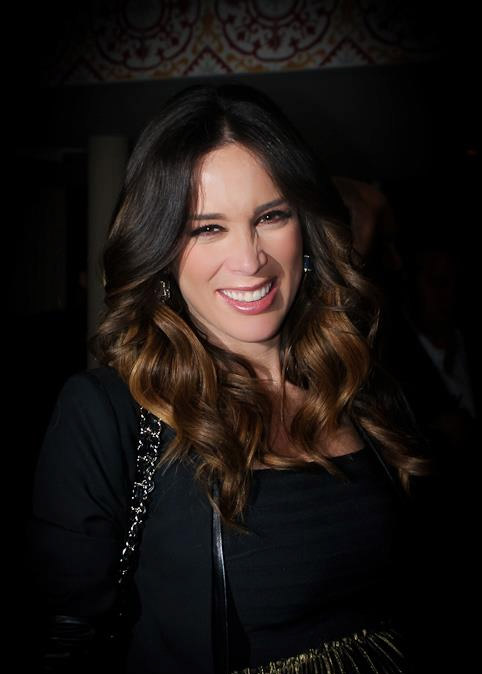
- Born: Jacqueline Bracamontes Van Hoorde; 23 December 1979 (age 46); Guadalajara, Jalisco, Mexico
- Occupations: Actress, former model
- Years active: 2002-present
- Title: Nuestra Belleza Jalisco 2000; Nuestra Belleza México 2000
- Spouse: Martin Fuentes (m. 2011)
- Children: 6
- Parent(s): Jesús Bracamontes; Jacqueline Van Hoorde

Jacqueline Bracamontes Van Hoorde (Note: Spanish: [ˈɟʝaklim bɾakaˈmontes βan ˈoɾðe] or [ɟʝakeˈlim -]. In isolation, her given name is pronounced [ˈɟʝaklin] or [ɟʝakeˈlin].; Dutch: [ʑɑkəˈlim braːkaːˈmɔntɛs fɑn ˈɦoːrdə]. In isolation, Jacqueline and Van are pronounced, respectively, [ʑɑkəˈlin] and [vɑn].) (born 23 December 1979) is a Mexican actress, former model and beauty pageant titleholder who won Nuestra Belleza Jalisco 2000, Nuestra Belleza México 2000 and represented her country at Miss Universe 2001.

== Early life ==
Bracamontes born in Guadalajara, Jalisco to Jesús Bracamontes, the former coach of the popular Mexican football team Chivas, and Jacqueline Van Hoorde, of Belgian and French origin. She is the oldest of three children. She has a sister Alina, and a brother, Jesus, Jr. Her father is currently a football analyst for the Hispanic-American television network Univision.

== Pageant career ==
After seeing her on a magazine cover, ex-Miss Universe Lupita Jones contacted her and asked her to enter the Nuestra Belleza México. Bracamontes went on to win the state and national beauty titles and to represent Mexico in Miss Universe 2001, which took place in Puerto Rico.

== Acting and hosting career ==
After being crowned Miss Mexico in 2000, Bracamontes decided to pursue a television career. She began her career hosting various award shows and special programs, including Acafest, Premios TVyNovelas and Fiesta Mexicana.

A soccer aficionado, in August 2008 she became host of a Mexican sports radio show on Vision AM, and was later invited by univision to be a host and correspondent of the 2002 FIFA World Cup. She has also worked with Televisa Deportes.

In 2003, she was cast in the Mexican telenovela Alegrijes y Rebujos, produced by Rosy Ocampo. One year later, she landed a role in the popular soap-opera Rubí, alongside Bárbara Mori and Eduardo Santamarina.

In 2006, she landed her first lead role in the Mexican novela Heridas de amor, alongside Brazilian-born actor Guy Ecker. The program was broadcast in several countries.

In spring 2007, Bracamontes was cast in her first feature film, entitled Cuando Las Cosas Suceden, playing the role of a nun named Lucia. Later that year, she briefly returned to hosting with the Mexican game show De Por Vida, but the show was quickly cancelled.

In 2008, she starred in the comedic Mexican telenovela Las Tontas No Van al Cielo, alongside Jaime Camil, which was extremely successful in both the Latin American and United States market.

She lent her voice to the character of Susan Murphy in the Spanish-language version of Monsters vs. Aliens released in 2009.

After finishing filming with Las Tontas No Van al Cielo, she starred in Sortilegio, with Cuban actor William Levy. Filming was completed in October 2009.

Bracamontes was chosen as one of the killers in the popular series Mujeres Asesinas which premiered in the fall of 2010.

Bracamontes was the host from the second to the sixth edition of La Voz... México (2012 - 2014, 2016 - 2017). In 2019 she host the first season of La Voz and in 2020 the second one.

In 2018, Bracamontes was part of Telemundo network's coverage of the 2018 FIFA World Cup. She co-hosted the prime-time variety show "Viva el mundial y más".

== Personal life ==
Bracamontes is a fan of Liga MX club Guadalajara. She married Martín Fuentes, a Mexican businessman and racetrack racer, on 1 October 2011 in Guadalajara. On 12 November 2012, Bracamontes and Fuentes announced in an exclusive interview with Caras magazine that Bracamontes was pregnant and she was expecting twins. Bracamontes gave birth to twin children, a boy, Martín, who died at birth due to respiratory complications, and a girl, Jacqueline, on 29 March 2013. On 15 December 2013, Bracamontes announced that she was pregnant with third child, and gave birth to a girl named Carolina on 9 July 2014. On 15 July 2016, she gave birth to their fourth child, Renata. On 20 December 2018, she gave birth to another set of twins, Emilia and Paula.

== Filmography ==
=== Film ===
Year	Title	Role	Notes
2007	Cuando las cosas suceden	Hermana Lucía	
2014	Hijo de Dios	Marta	Mexican version
2015	Entrenando a mi papá		

=== Television ===
Year	Title	Role	Notes
2002	Entre el amor y el odio	Leonela Montenegro	
2002	Cómplices al rescate	Jocelyn	
2002–03	¡Vivan los niños!	Hada de los Dientes	
2003	La hora pico		Episode:"El reventón"
2003–04	Alegrijes y rebujos	Angélica Rivas Márquez	
2004	Rubí	Maribel de la Fuente de Cárdenas	
2006–07	La fea más bella	Magaly Ruiz Esparza	
2006	Heridas de amor	Miranda San Llorente de Aragón	
2008	Las tontas no van al cielo	Cándida "Candy" Morales Alcalde	
2009	Sortilegio	Maria José Samaniego Miranda Lombardo / Sandra Samaniego Miranda	
2010	Mujeres asesinas	Irma	Episode:"Irma, de los peces"
2012–17	La voz... México	Herself	
2013	Hoy	Herself	
2017	El bienamado	Laura	
2019–20	La voz US	Herself	
2021	La suerte de Loli	Mariana	
2023–24	Los 50	Herself	Finale host; 2 episodes
2025	Miss Universe Latina, el reality	Herself	Host
2025	Velvet: El nuevo imperio	Herself	Guest star

=== Theatre ===
- Un gallego en paris (2006)
- La obra hasta que la muerte nos separe (2008)
- Hasta que la boda nos separe (2009)

== Awards and nominations ==
=== Premios TVyNovelas ===
Year	Category	Telenovela	Result
2004	Best Female Revelation	Alegrijes y Rebujos	Won
2007	Best Lead Actress	Heridas de amor	Nominated
2009	Best Lead Actress	Las tontas no van al cielo	Nominated
2010	Best Lead Actress	Sortilegio	Nominated

=== Premios Juventud ===
Year	Category	Nominated	Result
2010	Chica que me quita el sueño	Sortilegio	Won
2010	The best dressed	Herself	Nominated

=== Premios People en Español ===
Year	Category	Telenovela	Result
2010	Best Actress	Sortilegio	Nominated
2010	Best Couple with William Levy	Sortilegio	Nominated

== Notes ==
Awards and achievements
Preceded by (Sonora) Leticia Murray	Nuestra Belleza México; 2000	Succeeded by (Yucatán) Ericka Cruz
Preceded by Maria Pia Marín	Nuestra Belleza Jalisco; 2000	Succeeded by Miriam de Jesús Ayala
