= MIX5 =

M3
- Also known as: MIX5 (2018-19)
- Origin: Miami, Florida, U.S.
- Years active: 2016–2018, 2020-present
- Label: Sony Music Latin
- Members: Chris Vanny; Danelly Hoyer; Garmandy Candelario
- Past members: Brian Cruz; Taishmara Rivera
- Website: www.mix5official.com

MIX5 was a Latin American band formed on the second season of La Banda. The group consisted of three boys and two girls and was composed of Brian Cruz, Taishmara Rivera, Chris Vanny, Danelly Hoyer, and Garmandy Candelario.

MIX5 was formally announced as a group on the Univision website after winning the competition. The group disbanded in early 2018.

The band came back as a trio in 2020 with a new name, M3, which consists of Candelario, Vanny, and Hoyer. Cruz and Rivera became solo artists after the group split in 2018.

== Discography ==
=== Singles ===
Year	Title	Peak chart position	Album
2016	"A Puro Dolor"	28	TBA
2017	"Muévete"	N/A	TBA
2017	"Original"	N/A	TBA
2017	"Crazy"	N/A	TBA
