= Jorge Bernal =

Mexican footballer (born 1979)

Personal information
- Full name: Jorge Bernal Alarcón
- Date of birth: 24 October 1979 (age 47)
- Place of birth: Veracruz, Mexico
- Height: 1.79 m (5 ft 10 1/2 in)
- Position: Goalkeeper

Senior career*
Years	Team	Apps	(Gls)
2003–2009	Veracruz		
2009–2010	Necaxa	7	(0)
2009–2010	→ Veracruz (loan)		
2010–2011	Veracruz		
2011	Querétaro		
2011–2013	Veracruz	12	(0)
2013–2014	Delfines	2	(0)
- * Club domestic league appearances and goals

Jorge Bernal Alarcón (born October 24, 1979) is a Mexican former footballer who last played as a goalkeeper with Delfines F.C.

== Club career ==
He made his professional debut for Veracruz on 27 August 2003 against C.F. Monterrey, immediately saving a Luis Ernesto Pérez penalty. Shortly after, Bernal became the first choice goalkeeper for Veracruz.

After five seasons with Veracruz, Club San Luis obtained his rights in the 2008 Apertura draft. However, the club didn't register him, and he didn't play until the next season when he was transferred to Club Necaxa. The following season, Bernal returned to Veracruz now playing in the second division.
