= Tu Mirada =

Tu Mirada may refer to:

- "Tu Mirada", 1999 song by Luis Miguel from the album Amarte Es un Placer
- "Tu Mirada", 2011 song by Reik from the album Peligro
