= Des/Amor =

Studio album by Reik
- Released: June 17, 2016
- Recorded: 2015–2016
- Genres: Latin pop; pop rock
- Length: 37:26
- Label: Sony Latin

Reik chronology
Peligro (2011)	Des/Amor (2016)	Ahora (2019)

Singles from Des/Amor
- 1. "Voy a Olvidarte" Released: November 6, 2015; 2. "Ya me enteré" Released: April 8, 2016; 3. "Ya me enteré (Urban Version)" Released: July 21, 2016; 4. "Qué Gano Olvidándote" Released: January 14, 2017; 5. "Un Amor de Verdad" Released: August 11, 2017

Des/Amor (English: Un/Love) is the fifth studio album from Mexican Latin pop group Reik, released on June 17, 2016, through Sony Music Latin. The album received a nomination at the 17th Annual Latin Grammy Awards for Best Contemporary Pop Vocal Album and the Lo Nuestro Award for Pop Album of the Year.

== Accolades ==
Publication	Accolade	Year	Rank
Billboard	50 Best Albums of 2016	2016	48

== Track listing ==
1. "Qué Gano Olvidándote" – 3:27
2. "Vámonos Lejos" – 3:30
3. "De Rodillas" – 3:31
4. "Voy a Olvidarte" – 3:17
5. "Spanglish" – 3:25
6. "Un Amor de Verdad" – 3:33
7. "Ya Me Enteré" – 3:22
8. "We Only Have Tonight" – 3:28
9. "Náufragos" – 2:58
10. "Al Fin Estás Aquí" (featuring Felix y Gil) – 3:16
11. "Ya Me Enteré" (featuring Nicky Jam) [urban version] – 3:39

== Charts ==
=== Weekly charts ===
Chart (2016–17)	Peak position
Spanish Albums (PROMUSICAE)	55
US Top Latin Albums (Billboard)	1
US Latin Pop Albums (Billboard)	1

=== Year-end charts ===
Chart (2016)	Position
US Top Latin Albums (Billboard)	58

== Certifications ==
Region	Certification	Certified units/sales
Mexico (AMPROFON)	4× Platinum+Gold	270,000^{‡}
United States (RIAA)	Gold (Latin)	30,000^{‡}
^{‡} Sales+streaming figures based on certification alone.
