= Spanglish (disambiguation) =

Spanglish (a portmanteau of the words "Spanish" and "English") is a name given to various contact dialects that result from interaction between Spanish and English used by people who speak both languages or parts of both languages.

Spanglish may also refer to:

- Spanglish (film), 2004 American romantic comedy-drama film written and directed by James L. Brooks
- "Spanglish" (song), song by Mexican band Reik from their 2006 album Secuencia
