= Fantasía (Sebastián Yatra album) =

Studio album by Sebastián Yatra
- Released: April 12, 2019
- Recorded: 2018–2019
- Genre: Latin pop
- Length: 39:59
- Label: Universal Music
- Producer: Andrés Torres; Mauricio Rengifo; Jon Leone; Mau y Ricky; Camilo Echeverry; Julio Reyes Copello; Andrés Saavedra; Andy Clay; Fernando "Toby" Tobon; Jorge Luis Bello; Andres Munera

Sebastián Yatra chronology
| Mantra (2018) | Fantasía (2019) | Dharma (2022) |

Singles from Fantasía
- 1. "Vuelve" Released: September 27, 2018; 2. "Atado Entre Tus Manos" Released: November 2, 2018; 3. "Un Año" Released: January 17, 2019; 4. "Cristina" Released: March 21, 2019; 5. "En Guerra" Released: May 1, 2019

Fantasía (English: Fantasy) is the second studio album by Colombian singer Sebastián Yatra, released on April 12, 2019, through Universal Music. It was produced by Andrés Torres, Mauricio Rengifo, Jon Leone, Mau y Ricky, Camilo, Julio Reyes Copello, Andrés Saavedra, Andy Clay, Fernando "Toby" Tobon, Jorge Luis Bello and Andres Munera, and features collaborations with Reik, Camilo, Tommy Torres and Beret.

At the 20th Annual Latin Grammy Awards, the album was nominated for Album of the Year and Best Contemporary Pop Vocal Album, while the collaboration with Reik, "Un Año", received a nomination for Song of the Year. The album was also nominated for Best Latin Pop Album at the 62nd Annual Grammy Awards (Yatra's first and only Grammy nomination to date), as well as winning Album of the Year at the Premios Nuestra Tierra and Favorite Pop/Rock Album at the Latin American Music Awards of 2019.

The album debuted atop the US Billboard Latin Pop Albums chart with 5,000 album-equivalent units, being Yatra's second album to do so, the first one being Mantra in 2018. The album peaked at numbers 4 and 5 on the Spanish Albums chart and Billboard Top Latin Albums chart, respectively.

== Background ==
The album is composed of twelve songs leaning more towards romantic ballads, Yatra said about the album that "there's something we all have in common — love. So if I write the songs that are born from my soul about most difficult moments or the happiest, I know that I can connect with people", the theme of love appears throughout the album in songs such as "Elena", which is named after Mauricio Rengifo's daughter, and "Nunca Nos Preparamos Para Tanto Amor" ("We Never Prepared Ourselves for So Much Love"), written about an ex-girlfriend of Yatra. The song "En Guerra" ("In War"), which has a message about bullying and internal struggles, was chosen as an anti-bullying anthem by the Colombian organization Scholas Foundation, an organization where Yatra is also an embassador.

== Singles ==
During 2017, Yatra released the singles "Vuelve" and "Atado Entre Tus Manos", the former alongside Spanish singer Beret and the latter with Colombian singer Tommy Torres. On January 17, 2019, he released "Un Año", a collaboration with Mexican band Reik, the single was a commercial success in Latin America reaching the top ten in Argentina, Ecuardor, Mexico and Spain. During 2019, he released "Cristina" and "En Guerra", the latter with Colombian singer Camilo.

On March 26, 2020, Yatra released a re-recorded version of "Falta Amor" with Puerto Rican singer Ricky Martin, the single reached at 19 on the US Latin Pop Airplay and charted on several Latin American countries.

== Track listing ==
Fantasía track listing
| No. | Title | Writer(s) | Producer(s) | Length |
|---|---|---|---|---|
| 1. | "Cristina" | Andrés Torres; Mauricio Rengifo; Sebastian Obando Giraldo | Andrés Torres; Mauricio Rengifo | 3:21 |
| 2. | "Falta Amor" | Torres; Rengifo; Obando Giraldo | Torres; Rengifo | 3:24 |
| 3. | "Un Año" (featuring Reik) | Torres; Rengifo; Obando Giraldo; Gilberto Marín Espinoza; Jesús Navarro; Julio Ramirez Eguia | Torres; Rengifo | 2:43 |
| 4. | "Elena" | Torres; Rengifo; Obando Giraldo | Torres; Rengifo | 2:35 |
| 5. | "Fantasía" | Torres; Rengifo; Obando Giraldo | Torres; Rengifo | 2:58 |
| 6. | "En Guerra" (featuring Camilo) | Torres; Rengifo; Edgar Barrera; Jon Leone; Camilo Echeverry; Mauricio Renglero; Ricardo Renglero; Roberto Andrade Dirak; Obando Giraldo | Jon Leone; Mauricio Renglero; Ricardo Renglero; Camilo Echeverry | 3:41 |
| 7. | "Yo Te Extraño" | Torres; Rengifo; Barrera; Andres Castro; Obando Giraldo | Julio Reyes Copello | 3:43 |
| 8. | "Respiro" | Torres; Rengifo; Roberto Andrade Dirak; Obando Giraldo | Leone; Mauricio Renglero; Ricardo Renglero; Echeverry | 3:48 |
| 9. | "Atado entre tus Manos" (featuring Tommy Torres) | Tommy Torres; Obando Giraldo | Torres; Rengifo | 3:16 |
| 10. | "Aquí Estaré" | Andrés Saavedra; Torres; Rengifo; Andy Clay; Eduardo Osorio; Frank Santofimio; Andrade Dirak; Obando Giraldo | Torres; Rengifo; Andrés Saavedra; Andy Clay | 3:35 |
| 11. | "Vuelve" (featuring Beret) | Torres; Rengifo; Saavedra; Clay; Francisco Javier Alvarez Beret; Obando Giraldo | Torres; Rengifo; Saavedra; Clay | 3:45 |
| 12. | "Nunca Nos Preparamos Para Tanto Amor" | Torres; Rengifo; Andres Munera; Fernando Tobon; Jorge Luis Bello; Andrade Dirak; Obando Giraldo | Torres; Rengifo; Fernando "Toby" Tobon; Jorge Luis Bello; Andres Munera | 3:05 |
| Total length: | | | | 39:59 |

== Charts ==
Weekly chart performance for Fantasía
| Chart (2019) | Peak position |
|---|---|
| Spanish Albums (PROMUSICAE) | 4 |
| US Top Latin Albums (Billboard) | 5 |
| US Latin Pop Albums (Billboard) | 1 |

== Certifications ==
Certifications for Fantasía
| Region | Certification | Certified units/sales |
|---|---|---|
| Central America (CFC) | 2× Platinum | 14,000 |
| Mexico (AMPROFON) | 3× Platinum | 180,000^{‡} |
| United States (RIAA) | Platinum (Latin) | 60,000^{‡} |
^{‡} Sales+streaming figures based on certification alone.
