= Pareja del Año =

2021 single by Sebastián Yatra and Myke Towers

Single by Sebastián Yatra and Myke Towers

from the album Dharma
- Released: April 16, 2021
- Genre: Reggaeton; latin pop
- Length: 3:15
- Label: Universal Latino
- Songwriters: Sebastián Obando Giraldo; Miguel Ángel Torres Monge; Andrés Torres; José M. Reyes; Mauricio Rengifo; Orlando J. Cepeda Matos
- Producers: Andrés Torres; Mauricio Rengifo

Sebastián Yatra singles chronology
"Chica Ideal (Remix)" (2021)	"Pareja del Año" (2021)	"3 De La Mañana" (2021)

Myke Towers singles chronology
"Burberry" (2021)	"Pareja del Año" (2021)	"El Tren" (2021)

Music video
- "Pareja del Año" on YouTube

"Pareja del Año" (transl. "Couple of the Year") is a song by Colombian singer Sebastián Yatra and Puerto Rican rapper and singer Myke Towers. It was released on April 16, 2021 through Universal Music Latin Entertainment. The song was produced by Andrés Torres and Mauricio Rengifo. The song peaked at No. 2 on the US Billboard Bubbling Under Hot 100 chart and No. 10 on the US Billboard Hot Latin Songs chart.

== Background ==
At the beginning of April 2021, Sebastián Yatra announced his new song entitled "Pareja del Año" through a short preview. However, it was not yet known who would be the other artist that would be part of the song. It was later confirmed that the artist would be Myke Towers.

== Composition and lyric ==
The song combines reggaeton instruments with other string instruments such as guitars, violins and cellos, Yatra spoke about the rhythm of the song which referred to the newness of reggaeton and latin pop.

The lyrics of the song talk about two boys in love with a girl, one explains that he is in love with a girl that he misses and the other tells that he is in love with a girl who is not his, but that together they would be the couple of the year.

== Music video ==
The music video was released on April 16, 2021, the same day the single was released. It was directed by Daniel Durán and was recorded at the Adrienne Arsh Center in Miami, Florida. The music video shows Sebastián Yatra and Myke Towers in the theater along with a girl who is just watching them.

== Charts ==
=== Weekly charts ===
Weekly chart performance for "Pareja del Año"
Chart (2021)	Peak position
Argentina Hot 100 (Billboard)	2
Bolivia (Monitor Latino)	1
Chile (Monitor Latino)	3
Colombia (Monitor Latino)	10
Colombia (National-Report)	2
Colombia (Promúsica)	3
Costa Rica (Monitor Latino)	1
Dominican Republic (Monitor Latino)	10
Ecuador (Monitor Latino)	2
El Salvador (Monitor Latino)	1
Global 200 (Billboard)	16
Guatemala (Monitor Latino)	1
Honduras (Monitor Latino)	2
Mexican Streaming (AMPROFON)	5
Mexico Airplay (Billboard)	9
Nicaragua (Monitor Latino)	4
Panama (Monitor Latino)	2
Paraguay (Monitor Latino)	2
Paraguay (SGP)	1
Peru (Monitor Latino)	1
Portugal (AFP)	106
Puerto Rico (Monitor Latino)	8
Spain (Promusicae)	1
Uruguay (Monitor Latino)	3
US Bubbling Under Hot 100 (Billboard)	2
US Hot Latin Songs (Billboard)	10
US Latin Airplay (Billboard)	1
US Latin Pop Airplay (Billboard)	1
US Latin Rhythm Airplay (Billboard)	1
Venezuela (Monitor Latino)	2

=== Year-end charts ===
Year-end chart performance for "Pareja del Año"
Chart (2021)	Position
Global 200 (Billboard)	96
Spain (PROMUSICAE)	2
US Hot Latin Songs (Billboard)	18

== Certifications ==
Region	Certification	Certified units/sales
Brazil (Pro-Música Brasil)	Gold	20,000^{‡}
Mexico (AMPROFON)	Diamond+Platinum+Gold	910,000^{‡}
Spain (Promusicae)	8× Platinum	480,000^{‡}
United States (RIAA)	8× Platinum (Latin)	480,000^{‡}
Streaming
Central America (CFC)	3× Platinum	21,000,000^{†}
^{‡} Sales+streaming figures based on certification alone.^{†} Streaming-only figures based on certification alone.

== See also ==
- List of Billboard number-one Latin songs of 2021
