= Dharma (Sebastián Yatra album) =

Studio album by Sebastián Yatra
- Released: January 28, 2022
- Recorded: 2021
- Genres: Latin; Pop; Reggaeton
- Length: 53:48
- Language: Spanish
- Label: Universal Music Latino

Sebastián Yatra chronology
Fantasía (2019)	Dharma (2022)	Dharma + (2022)

Singles from Dharma
- 1. "Runaway" Released: June 20, 2019; 2. "TBT" Released: February 20, 2020; 3. "A Dónde Van" Released: August 26, 2020; 4. "Chica Ideal" Released: October 15, 2020; 5. "Adiós" Released: February 4, 2021; 6. "Pareja del Año" Released: April 15, 2021; 7. "Tarde" Released: September 16, 2021; 8. "Tacones Rojos" Released: October 22, 2021; 9. "Amor Pasajero" Released: January 5, 2022; 10. "Regresé" Released: January 13, 2022; 11. "Melancólicos Anónimos" Released: January 20, 2022; 12. "Dharma" Released: January 28, 2022

Dharma is the third studio album by Colombian singer Sebastián Yatra, released by Universal Music Latino on January 28, 2022.

It won the Best Pop Vocal Album category at the 23rd Annual Latin Grammy Awards, Yatra's first win.

== Background ==
In November 2021, Yatra released his breakout hit "Dos Oruguitas", from the Disney animated movie Encanto, which reached the number 2 spot on the Billboard Hot Latin Songs chart.

== Commercial performance ==
Dharma debuted at number 12 on the US Billboard Top Latin Albums, including number 2 on the Latin Pop Albums chart with over 4,000 album equivalent units. In its first week, the album amassed over 2.3 billion streams.

== Track listing ==
Dharma track listing
No.	Title	Writer(s)	Producer(s)	Length
1.	"Básicamente"	Andrés Torres; Mauricio Rengifo; Manuel Lorente Freire; Sebastián Obando Giraldo	Andrés Torres; Mauricio Rengifo	2:25
2.	"Dharma" (with Jorge Celedón and Rosario)	Jorge Celedón; Julián Bernal; Manuel Enrique Lara Colmenares; Manuel Lorente Freire; Rosario; Sebastián Obando Giraldo	Manuel Lara	3:15
3.	"Modo Avión"	Julián Bernal; Manuel Enrique Lara Colmenares; Manuel Lorente Freire; Sebastián Obando Giraldo	Manuel Lara	2:51
4.	"Quererte Bonito" (with Elena Rose)	Elena Rose; Julio Reyes Copello; Sebastián Obando Giraldo	Julio Reyes Copello	4:31
5.	"Tacones Rojos"	Juan Jo; Lofty; Manuel Lara; Pablo; Sebastián Obando Giraldo	Manuel Lara; Joan Josep Monserrat Riutort; Pablo María Rousselon de Croisoeuil Chateaurenard	3:09
6.	"Amor Pasajero"	Andrés Torres; Mauricio Rengifo; Edgar Semper; Luian Malavé; Pablo C Fuentes; Rafael Salcedo; Sebastián Obando Giraldo; Xavier Semper	Andrés Torres; Mauricio Rengifo; Hear This Music	2:31
7.	"Regresé" (with Justin Quiles and L-Gante)	César Augusto; David Julca; Elián Ángel Valenzuela; Héctor C. López; Joan Josep Monserrat Riutort; Jonathan Julca; Sebastián Obando Giraldo	Caleb Calloway; XAXO	3:15
8.	"Si Me La Haces" (with Lenny Tavárez and Mariah Angeliq)	Jonathan David Leone; Alejandro Manuel Fernández; Christian Daniel Mojica Blanco; Joseph Michael Barrios; Juan Diego Arteaga; Lenny Tavárez; Luis J. Pérez Jr; Mariah Angeliq Pérez; Sebastián Obando Giraldo	Jon Leone; Cashae	3:08
9.	"Tarde"	Elena Rose; Julián Bernal; Manuel Lara; Manuel Lorente; Sebastián Obando Giraldo	Manuel Lara; Julián Bernal	3:06
10.	"Melancólicos Anónimos"	Benjamín Alerhand Sissa; Joan Josep Monserrat Riutort; Manuel Enrique Lara Colmenares; Manuel Lorente Freire; Sebastián Obando Giraldo	Manuel Lara	3:19
11.	"Las Dudas" (with Aitana)	Andrés Torres; Mauricio Rengifo; Aitana; Andy Clay; Manuel Lorente Freire; Sebastián Obando Giraldo	Andrés Torres; Mauricio Rengifo	2:40
12.	"Adiós"	David Julca; Jonathan Julca; Pablo López; Sebastián Obando Giraldo	Pablo López; Andrés Munera; Andrés Guerrero	3:02
13.	"A Dónde Van" (with Álvaro Díaz)	Alejandro Robledo Valencia; Álvaro Díaz; Joan Josep Monserrat Riutort; Juan Camilo Vargas; Manuel Lorente Freire; Sebastián Obando Giraldo	Noise Up; Andrés Munera; Andrés Guerrero Ruíz; Joan Josep Monserrat Riutort; Gabriel Morales	2:56
14.	"TBT" (with Rauw Alejandro and Manuel Turizo)	Andrés Torres; Mauricio Rengifo; Alejandro Rengifo; David Julca; Johnny Julca; Manuel Turizo; Rauw Alejandro; Sebastián Obando Giraldo; Sech	Andrés Torres; Mauricio Rengifo; XAXO	3:59
15.	"Chica Ideal" (with Guaynaa)	Keityn; Ovy on the Drums; Andy Clay; Daniel Pérez Venencia; Guaynaa; Juan Camilo Vargas; Manuel Alejandro Bustillo; Sebastián Obando Giraldo	Ovy on the Drums	3:03
16.	"Runaway" (with Daddy Yankee and Natti Natasha featuring Jonas Brothers)	Andrés Torres; Mauricio Rengifo; Daddy Yankee; J. Ángel; Natti Natasha; Raphy Pina; Sebastián Obando Giraldo	Andrés Torres; Mauricio Rengifo	3:22
17.	"Pareja Del Año" (with Myke Towers)	Andrés Torres; Mauricio Rengifo; José M Reyes; Michael A. Torres Monge; Orlando J. Cepeda Matos; Sebastián Obando Giraldo	Mauricio Rengifo; Andrés Torres	3:15
Total length:				53:48

== Charts ==
=== Weekly charts ===
Weekly chart performance for Dharma
Chart (2022)	Peak position
Spanish Albums (Promusicae)	1
US Latin Pop Albums (Billboard)	2
US Top Latin Albums (Billboard)	13

=== Year-end charts ===
2022 year-end chart performance for Dharma
Chart (2022)	Position
Spanish Albums (PROMUSICAE)	6

2023 year-end chart performance for Dharma
Chart (2023)	Position
Spanish Albums (PROMUSICAE)	29

== Certifications ==
Certifications for Dharma
Region	Certification	Certified units/sales
Mexico (AMPROFON)	4× Platinum+Gold	630,000^{‡}
Spain (Promusicae)	Platinum	40,000^{‡}
United States (RIAA)	5× Platinum (Latin)	300,000^{‡}
Streaming
Central America (CFC)	Platinum	7,000,000^{†}
^{‡} Sales+streaming figures based on certification alone.^{†} Streaming-only figures based on certification alone.
