= Sesión Metropolitana =

Live album by Reik
- Released: July 11, 2006
- Recorded: October 27, 2005
- Genre: Latin pop; pop rock
- Length: 1:02:03
- Label: Sony BMG

Reik chronology
Reik (2005)	Sesión Metropolitana (2006)	Secuencia (2006)

Sesión Metropolitana is a live album from Mexican Latin pop group Reik, released on July 11, 2006 through Sony BMG. The album was recorded at their concert on October 27, 2005.

== Track listing ==
1. "No Sé Si Es Amor" – 04:28 ( Cibrian, Ruiz )
2. "Cuando Estas Conmigo" – 04:08 ( Vásquez )
3. "Noviembre Sin Ti" – 03:45 ( Vásquez )
4. "Vuelve" – 03:31 ( Cibrian, Ruiz )
5. "Amor Primero" – 04:59 ( Cibrian, Ruiz )
6. "Que Lloro" – 04:19 ( García )
7. "Cada Mañana" – 04:36 ( Amaya, Vásquez )
8. "Levemente" – 05:56 ( Ortiz, Vázquez )
9. "Amarte Duele" – 04:21 ( Lafourcader )
10. "Qué Vida La Mía" – 04:06 ( Cibrian, Ruiz )
11. "Niña" – 03:37 ( Cibrian, Curiel, Ruiz)
12. "Yo Quisiera" – 04:09 ( Amaya )
13. "Como Me Duele" – 10:08 ( Ramírez, Valdez )

== Chart performance ==
Source: Billboard magazine

Year	Chart	Peak
2006	Latin Pop Albums	13
2006	Top Latin Albums	35
2006	Top Heatseekers	42
