= Reik (album) =

Studio album by Reik
- Released: 24 May 2005
- Recorded: 2004–2005
- Genres: Latin pop; pop rock; Latin rock; Latin ballad
- Length: 31:38
- Label: Sony BMG
- Producers: Abelardo López Vázquez; Kiko Cibrián

Reik chronology
Reik (2005)	Sesión Metropolitana (2006)

Singles from Reik
- 1. "Yo Quisiera" Released: 8 November 2004; 2. "Qué Vida La Mía" Released: 14 March 2005; 3. "Noviembre Sin Ti" Released: 8 August 2005; 4. "Niña" Released: 7 November 2005; 5. "Levemente" Released: 16 January 2006

Reik is the debut eponymous album from Mexican Latin pop group Reik, released on 24 May 2005 through Sony BMG. The album features these singles: "Yo Quisiera", "Qué Vida La Mía", "Noviembre Sin Ti", "Niña" and "Levemente".

== Track listing ==
1. "Levemente" (Lightly) – 3:57 (Ortiz, Vázquez)
2. "Amor Primero" (First Love) – 3:47 (Cibrián, Ruiz)
3. "Cuando Estás Conmigo" (When You're With Me) – 3:11 (Vázquez)
4. "Qué Vida La Mía" (What A Life Mine Is) – 2:52 (Cibrián, Ruiz)
5. "Vuelve" (Come Back) – 3:18 (Cibrián, Ruiz)
6. "Yo Quisiera" (I Wish) – 3:38 (Ortiz, Vázquez)
7. "Noviembre Sin Ti" (November Without You) – 3:38 (Vázquez)
8. "Niña" (Girl) – 2:52 (Cibrián, Curiel, Ruiz)
9. "No Sé Si Es Amor" (I Don't Know If It's Love) – 3:09 (Cibrián, Ruiz)
10. "Cada Mañana" (Every Morning) – 3:54 (Amaya, Vázquez)
11. "Cómo Me Duele" (How It Hurts Me) – 3:18 (Ramirez, Valdez)

== In popular culture ==
=== Other appearances ===
The song "Noviembre Sin Ti" is also featured on the compilation album Now Esto Es Musica! Latino, while "Levémente" is featured on Now Esto Es Musica! Latino 2.

=== Cover versions ===
- "Yo Quisiera" was covered by Mexican actor Michael Ronda in Disney Channel Argentine TV series Soy Luna.

== Production credits ==
- Kiko Cibrián – arranging, programming, engineering, producer
- Abelardo López Vázquez – arranging, programming, engineering, producer
- Mike Harris – engineering
- Julian Tydelski – engineering
- Manuel Ruiz – engineering
- Gabriel Wallach – mastering
- Gonzalo Morales – photography

== Charts ==
=== Weekly charts ===
Chart (2005–2006)	Peak position
US Heatseekers Albums (Billboard)	13
US Top Latin Albums (Billboard)	34
US Latin Pop Albums (Billboard)	13

=== Year-end charts ===
Chart (2006)	Position
US Top Latin Albums (Billboard)	53

== Sales and certifications ==
Region	Certification	Certified units/sales
Mexico (AMPROFON)	4× Platinum	400,000^{‡}
United States (RIAA)	Platinum (Latin)	100,000^{^}
^{^} Shipments figures based on certification alone.^{‡} Sales+streaming figures based on certification alone.
