= Un Día Más =

Studio album by Reik
- Released: 30 September 2008
- Recorded: 2007–2008
- Genre: Latin pop; pop rock
- Length: 35:04
- Label: Sony BMG
- Producer: Cachorro López

Reik chronology
Secuencia (2006)	Un Día Más (2008)	Peligro (2011)

Un Día Más (English: One More Day) is the third studio album from Mexican Latin pop group Reik, released on 30 September 2008 through Sony BMG. The album features the singles "Inolvidable" and "Fui". The album won the 2009 Latin Grammy award for Best Pop Album by a Duo/Group with Vocals.

== Track listing ==
1. "Ilusionado" (Hopeful)
2. "Piel De Ciudad" (City Skin)
3. "Fui" (I Was)
4. "Inolvidable" (Unforgettable)
5. "No Me Hables Del Ayer" (Don't Talk To Me About Yesterday)
6. "No Hay Nadie Más" (There Is No One Else)
7. "No Desaparecerá" (It Will Not Disappear)
8. "Voy A Estar" (I'm Going To Be)
9. "Vuelve A Mí" (Return To Me)
10. "Un Día Más (One More Day)

=== Bonus track ===
- "Momentos" (Moments)
- "Fui (Acústica)" (I Was (Acoustic))

== Charts ==
=== Weekly charts ===
Chart (2008)	Peak position
Mexican Albums (AMPROFON)	11
US Heatseekers Albums (Billboard)	3
US Top Latin Albums (Billboard)	11
US Latin Pop Albums (Billboard)	3

=== Year-end charts ===
Chart (2009)	Position
US Top Latin Albums (Billboard)	62

== Sales and certifications ==
Region	Certification	Certified units/sales
Mexico (AMPROFON)	Platinum+Gold	120,000^{‡}
^{‡} Sales+streaming figures based on certification alone.
