= Un Año =

2019 song by Sebastián Yatra

Single by Sebastián Yatra with Reik

from the album Fantasía
- Released: January 17, 2019
- Recorded: 2018
- Length: 3:12
- Label: Universal Music Latino, UMLE
- Songwriters: Sebastian Obando Giraldo; Andrés Torres; Mauricio Rengifo
- Producers: Andrés Torres; Dandee

Sebastián Yatra singles chronology
"Ni Gucci Ni Prada" (2018)	"Un Año" (2019)	"Déjate Querer" (2019)

Reik singles chronology
"Ráptame" (2018)	"Un Año" (2019)	"Duele" (2019)

Un Año is a song by Colombian singer Sebastián Yatra with Mexican pop rock group Reik, it was released on January 17, 2019.

== Background ==
"Un Año" was released on January 17, 2019. the song was written by Sebastian Yatra, Andrés Torres, Mauricio Rengifo and his producer Dandee.

== Cover versions ==
On June 6, 2021, Filipino boy group BGYO performed a cover of "Un Año" on their virtual international fan meet.

== Commercial performance ==
In United States, "Un Año" begin at number 37 on the Hot Latin Songs and peaked on the number 12 on April 20, 2020. It also peaked number four on Latin Pop Airplay and topped both Latin Airplay

In Spain, the song peaked the number six on February 24, 2020.

In other countries, the song topped the charts in Ecuador and reached the top 10 in Argentina and Mexico, it has also reached the top 20 in Colombia.

== Charts ==
=== Weekly charts ===
Weekly chart performance for "Un Año"
Chart (2019)	Peak position
Argentina Hot 100 (Billboard)	4
Colombia (National-Report)	14
Ecuador (National-Report)	1
Mexico Airplay (Billboard)	6
Spain (Promusicae)	6
US Hot Latin Songs (Billboard)	12
US Latin Airplay (Billboard)	1
US Latin Pop Airplay (Billboard)	4

=== Year-end charts ===
Year-end chart performance for "Un Año"
Chart (2019)	Position
Spain (PROMUSICAE)	21

== Certifications ==
Region	Certification	Certified units/sales
Brazil (Pro-Música Brasil)	Platinum	40,000^{‡}
Mexico (AMPROFON)	Diamond+2× Platinum	420,000^{‡}
Spain (Promusicae)	4× Platinum	240,000^{‡}
United States (RIAA)	4× Platinum (Latin)	240,000^{‡}
^{‡} Sales+streaming figures based on certification alone.
