= Secuencia =

Studio album by Reik
- Released: 12 December 2006
- Recorded: June – September 2006
- Genres: Latin pop; pop rock
- Length: 35:46
- Label: Sony BMG
- Producer: Kiko Cibrián

Reik chronology
Sesión Metropolitana (2006)	Secuencia (2006)	Un Día Más (2008)

Singles from Secuencia
- 1. "Invierno" Released: 18 September 2006; 2. "Me Duele Amarte" Released: 8 January 2007; 3. "De Qué Sirve" Released: 7 May 2007; 4. "Sabes" Released: 8 October 2007

Secuencia (Sequence) is the second studio album from Mexican Latin pop group Reik, released on 12 December 2006 through Sony BMG. The album features the singles "Invierno", "Me Duele Amarte", "De Qué Sirve" and "Sabes".

== Track listing ==
No.	Title	Writer(s)	Length
1.	"Quien Decide Es el Amor"	Dennise Rich · Juan Carlos Pérez Soto	3:22
2.	"Sabes"	Kiko Cibrián · Manuel Ruíz	3:41
3.	"Sin Conocerte"	Eduardo Osorio · Juan Carlos Pérez Soto	3:16
4.	"Me Duele Amarte"	Daniel Cruz · Taura Lennox	3:13
5.	"Vivo en Sueños"	Kiko Cibrián · Julio Ramírez	3:12
6.	"Invierno"	Claudia Brant · Mark Portmann	3:36
7.	"De Qué Sirve"	Kiko Cibrián · Julio Ramírez · Manuel Ruíz	3:42
8.	"Llegó Tu Amor"	Kiko Cibrián · Manuel Ruíz · Julio Ramírez · Noel Schajris	3:36
9.	"Quédate"	Kiko Cibrián · Manuel Ruíz	3:22
10.	"No Sé Porqué Te Vas" ((I Can't Believe She's Gone))	Patrick Sarin · Tommy Erkman · Juan Carlos Pérez Soto	3:49
11.	"Ahora Sin Ti"	Marco Polo Moraga · Dennise Silva · Jesús Navarro · Julio Ramírez	2:59
Total length:			32:35

=== iTunes bonus track ===
- "Ahora Sin Ti" (vivo) (Without You Now (live)) – 3:15

== Production credits ==
- Kiko Cibrián – arranging, programming, engineering, producer
- Mike Harris – engineering
- Julian Tydelski – engineering
- Carlos Álvarez Montero – photography
- Manuel Ruíz – production coordination
- Miguel Trujillo – A&R
- Gabriel Wallach – mastering

== Chart performance ==
Source: Billboard magazine

Year	Chart	Peak
2006	Latin Pop Albums	12
2006	Top Heatseekers	26
2006	Top Latin Albums	31
2006	Top 100 Mexico	39

== Sales and certifications ==
Region	Certification	Certified units/sales
Mexico (AMPROFON)	Platinum+Gold	150,000^{‡}
^{‡} Sales+streaming figures based on certification alone.
