= Sebastián Yatra =

Colombian singer (born 1994)

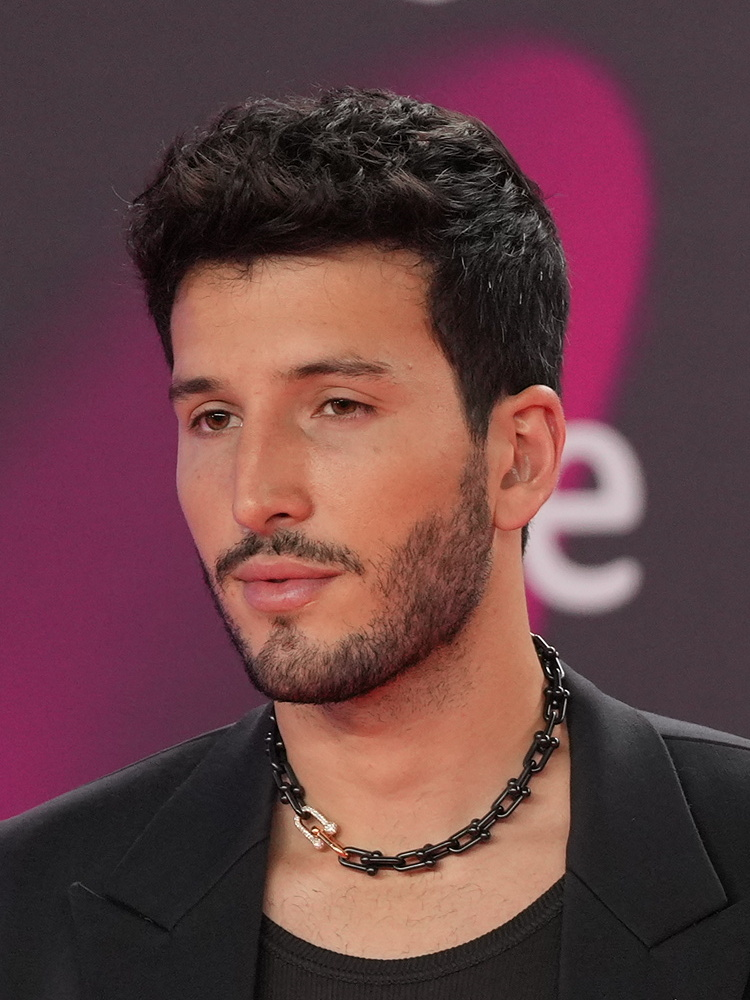
- Yatra at the 2023 Latin Grammy Awards

Background information
- Born: Sebastián Obando Giraldo; 15 October 1994 (age 32); Medellín, Antioquia, Colombia
- Genres: Pop; Latin pop; reggaeton
- Occupations: Singer; songwriter; musician; stage actor
- Instruments: Vocals; guitar
- Works: Discography
- Years active: 2013–present
- Label: Universal Latino
- Website: sebastianyatra.com

Sebastián Obando Giraldo (born 15 October 1994), known professionally as Sebastián Yatra, is a Colombian singer. He began as a Latin pop artist and has recorded many ballads, but has released several successful reggaeton singles. Yatra is noted for his romantic lyrics, melding traditional lyricism with modern reggaeton influences. He rose to prominence in Latin America in 2016 when he released the hit "Traicionera". He has released three studio albums and recorded with artists from a diverse range of musical genres throughout his career.

Born in Medellín but raised primarily in Miami, Yatra began singing at a young age and returned to Colombia to begin his musical career. He achieved breakout success with "Traicionera" followed by "Robarte un Beso" featuring Carlos Vives. "Traicionera" served as the lead single for his 2018 debut album, Mantra, which also featured the single "Sutra", featuring Puerto Rican rapper Dalmata. He then released the album Fantasía including the lead single "Un Año" featuring Mexican band Reik. He received continued success collaborating with Daddy Yankee, Natti Natasha, and the Jonas Brothers on the bilingual single "Runaway". In 2024, Yatra made his Broadway debut as Billy Flynn in the musical Chicago.

== Early life ==
Born in Medellín, Yatra lived briefly in Cartagena before moving with his mother to Miami, Florida, at age five. At the same time, his father stayed in Colombia to work in real estate. Discussing the experience, Yatra explained, "It was a big sacrifice. Since my dad stayed working in Colombia, [my parents] had a long-distance relationship for like 12 years." He studied piano, guitar, and vocal technique, and was an avid soccer player before deciding to concentrate on his music, although he continues to practice soccer as a hobby. The first concert he attended was that of Colombian pop singer Juanes. He decided to become a singer at age twelve after landing the role of Troy Bolton in his school production of High School Musical.

In high school, Yatra played the position of the central defensive midfielder on his school's soccer team and often wore a scarf over his mouth during practice to protect his voice. He practiced performing for his teammates on the bus to and from games, performing songs by his favorite artists as well as his own original songs. He attended vocal lessons every day after school. After graduating from the Sagemont Preparatory School in Weston, Florida in 2012, Yatra attended Babson College to study business administration. However, Yatra dropped out of school to focus on music and at age 20, Yatra returned to Colombia to begin his musical career.

== Career ==
=== 2013–2017: Early career and "Traicionera" ===
In September 2013, Yatra had his first minor hit single, "El psicólogo", which charted in his home country Colombia, as well as Venezuela, Ecuador, Mexico and the United States. "El Psicólogo", a pop ballad with reggae influences was recorded in the United States, and produced by well-known Latin producers Yhonny Atella and Ender Thomas, mastered by Tom Coynequien and music video shot by Colombian director Simón Brand. Yatra toured with Paty Cantú in her Drama Queen Tour and with Sandoval Sandoval in her Deja Que La Vida Te Sorprenda Tour gaining more fame. His follow-up single "Todo Lo Que Siento" was mildly successful, but the ensuing "Para olvidar" became a big hit in Colombia, Venezuela, Ecuador, and yet again in the States. 2015 saw launching of two successful singles, "No me llames" featuring Alkilados and "Cómo Mirarte", a repeat hit first as solo and again in a collaboration featuring Kenai and remixed by producers like Kevin ADG, Chan El Genio and Dandee.

Yatra first received international success with the single "Traicionera" a Reggaeton, trap and EDM-influenced hit that solidified his status as a favorite international artist in Latin America, in the Latin market in the States also charting in Spain and finding success all over Europe. The single was classified double platinum in Colombia and platinum in Ecuador. It peaked at number twelve on the Billboard Hot 100 chart. Yatra's collaboration with Colombian vallenato singer Carlos Vives entitled "Robarte Un Beso" won an ASCAP award. The single's accompanying music video, directed by Venezuelan filmmaker Daniel Duran and released on 28 July 2017, features four love stories that all center around partners serenading each other.

=== 2018–2019: Mantra and Fantasia ===
We never said, we do 'this' type of music, I just make songs to make you wanna party like crazy or make you get intimate with a girl you like. All these songs have a purpose and each of them are written for a different moment in life. All these beats make you feel different things. I did a trap record called 'Como Si Nada' with this guy Calle and the rap he does is mind-blowing.

— Yatra, on his 2018 album Mantra.

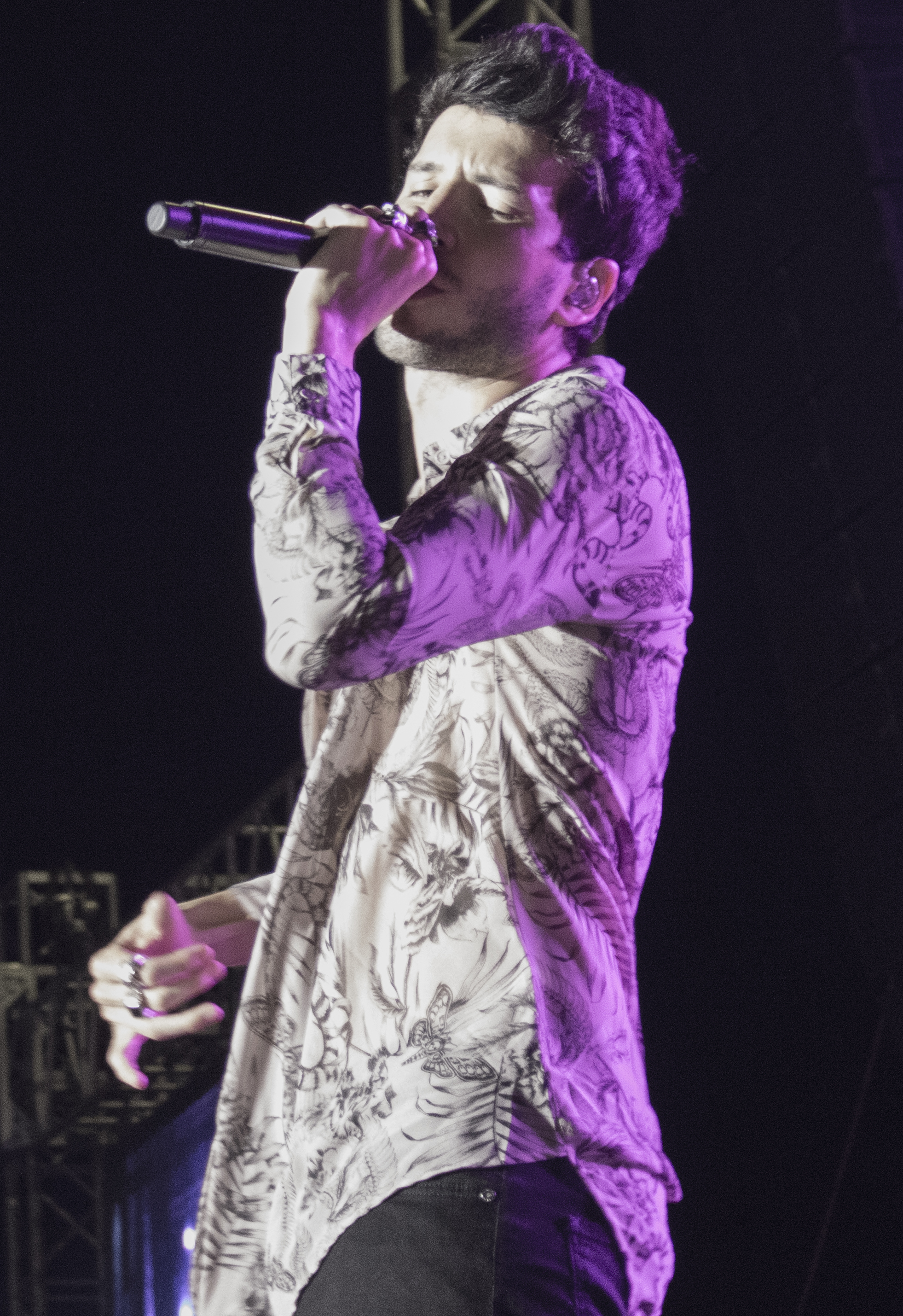
Yatra performing in 2018

Yatra released the album Mantra on 18 May 2018. On the album's title, he explained, "My mantra are my songs. It takes you to that good energy with whatever you're listening to. All these songs have these positive vibes, especially in the lyrics. They're just sharing love." In 2018, Yatra voiced the character Migo in the Spanish language version of the animated film Smallfoot. He released the single "Sutra" featuring Puerto Rican reggaeton artist Dalmata in March 2018, which also peaked at number 26 on the Billboard Hot Latin Songs.

In December 2018, Yatra's single "Ya No Tiene Novio" featuring Mau y Ricky reached number one on the Billboard Latin Airplay chart. To promote the song, Yatra and Mau y Ricky publicized a "feud" between them to create attention around the track, with Yatra explaining, "It's pretty crazy because the song blew up before it even came out. Instead of telling people it was awesome, we told everyone that the collaboration sucked and having everyone say, 'Dude you guys messed up the song so bad.'" Artists Maluma, Zion Y Lennox, and J Balvin publicly commented on the "rivalry". The music video features a playful nod at the artificial feud, with the artists competing over love interests.

In January 2019, Sebastián Yatra and Reik launched a collaborative work titled "Un Año" (one year). The single was well-received by many Venezuelan migrants who identify the song lyrics with separations from families. The single was released alongside his new album Fantasía, which was released in April 2019. Despite releasing several reggaeton-influenced songs prior to releasing the album, the majority of the twelve tracks on Fantasía have been classified as ballads. Yatra commented, "I started my career as a balladeer. I listened to Luis Fonsi, Reik, Alex Ubago and Michael Bublé. I'm very grateful for all the urban things I've done but I did not want to lose my essence." Fantasía has been nominated for Best Latin Pop Album at the 62nd Annual Grammy Awards.

=== 2019–present: Dharma ===
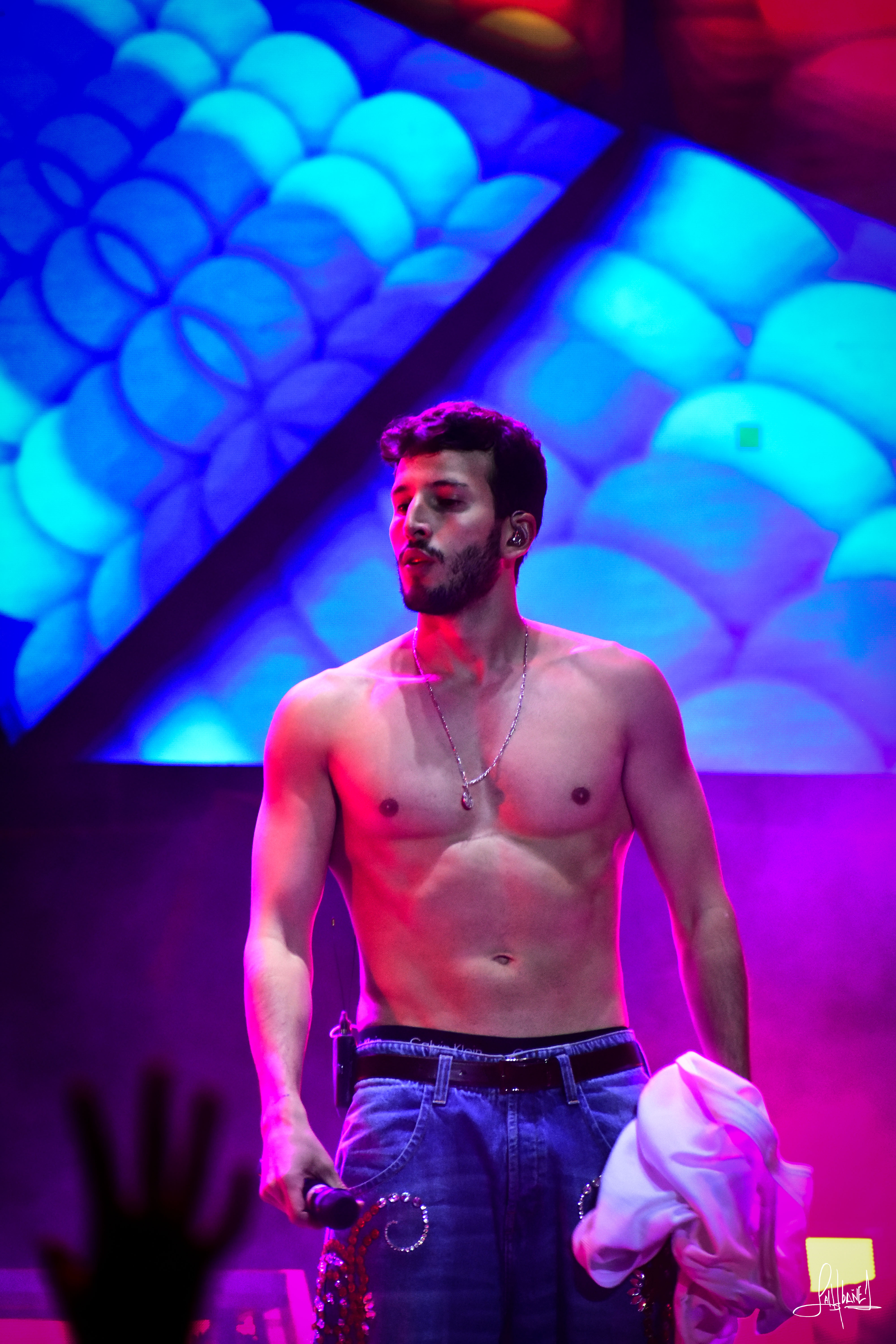
Yatra performing in La Paz, Bolivia in 2022.

In June 2019, Yatra released the track "Runaway" with Daddy Yankee and Natti Natasha, featuring the Jonas Brothers. "Runaway" is the first bilingual song Yatra has released. After writing the chorus in English, Yatra realized that he wanted a mainstream English-language musician to feature on the track, putting the recording of the song on hold for two years while he searched for the right collaborators. Commenting on the song, Yatra stated, "you feel the happiness in the track." Yatra performed the song alongside Natti Natasha, Daddy Yankee, and the Jonas Brothers on the opening night of the Jonas Brothers' Happiness Begins Tour in Miami.

His single "Oye", featuring Argentine singer Tini, reached number one on the Billboard Argentina Hot 100 for the week of 26 October 2019. The music video received more than 40 million views in the two weeks after it was released on YouTube. In October 2019 he was involved in political controversies after expressing his support for the politicians and candidates of the Colombian far-right, including controversial former president Álvaro Uribe. Yatra collaborated with Mexican rock group Maná in November 2019 to release a new version of the group's 1995 single "No Ha Parado De Llover". The song's music video, which partially centers around a fatal car accident, serves as a public service announcement against texting and driving. Maná initiated the collaboration after seeing Yatra cover the song at the 2018 Grammys gala.

Yatra has publicly advocated for fans to practice social distancing to stop the spread of COVID-19. In March 2020, he began reading children's books on Instagram Live every night at 8pm EST. Also in March 2020, he released a remix of his Fantasía song "Falta Amor" featuring Ricky Martin. On the collaboration, Yatra reflected, "Singing with Ricky Martin is just insane. I would have never thought it possible in [this] lifetime. It's huge not only as a Latino, but for any person that loves music." He announced that he will be the opening act for Martin and Enrique Iglesias's US tour, which is planned to take place from 5 September to 30 October 2021.

In 2021, Yatra recorded the Spanish song "Dos Oruguitas" and its English language version, "Two Oruguitas" for the soundtrack of the Disney animated film Encanto. The song, written by Lin-Manuel Miranda, represented Yatra's first inclusion on a Disney movie soundtrack and the accomplishment of a personal goal: "It's always been a dream of mine to be a part of a Disney movie and it really hits the heart when it's a Disney movie about my country and showing the best of what we have to offer, which is love and family and miracles," Yatra noted. "Dos Oruguitas" was one of five songs nominated for Best Original Song for the 2022 Oscars. On 22 February 2022, Yatra revealed the North America dates for his Dharma World Tour.

== Artistry ==
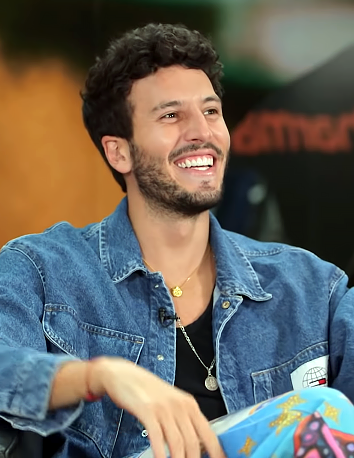
Yatra photographed in an interview in 2022.

Yatra's music has been classified as Latin pop, reggaeton, and ballads. According to The Fader, Yatras music lands "somewhere in between the olden times' sappy romantics and the new wave's sensuous vibras." He is influenced by Latin pop and reggaeton artists Ricky Martin, Shakira, J Balvin, Juanes, and Reik. In an interview with Billboard, he expressed a desire to collaborate with Italian opera singer Andrea Bocelli. Yatra believes that contemporary musicians commit an "error in associating ballads with boring and slow and old", and hopes to rejuvenate intererest in ballads for a younger audience. However, his music contains elements of other genres; Desire Thompson of Vibe described his song "Traicionera" as a "trap-EDM blend".

Despite growing up in Florida and being fluent in English, Yatra sings almost exclusively in Spanish. Yatra explains, "My goal was always to be a singer in Spanish. And I really wanted to understand where I come from and live it. A lot of times I went to Colombia and, even though I spoke Spanish and was always speaking Spanish with my parents, I still felt like an outsider. I wasn't 100 percent part of it. I wanted to give my roots the importance they deserve." His June 2019 song "Runaway" was his first foray into bilingual songwriting. In December 2019, he collaborated with South Korean boy group Monsta X for the song "Magnetic", which features verses from Yatra in Spanish and a bridge from Monsta X in Spanglish. Sara Delgado of Teen Vogue called the song a "truly international pop hit".

== Filmography ==
=== Films ===
Year	Title	Role	Notes
2018	Smallfoot	Migo	Voice role; Spanish dubbing
2019	Me llevarás en ti	Himself	Guest star
2019	Klaus	Jesper	Voice role; Spanish dubbing
2024	Space Cadet	Toddrick Spencer	

=== Telenovels and series ===
Year	Title	Role	Notes
2017	Guerra de ídolos	Himself	Guest star
2017	Las Estrellas	Sebastián Ordoñez	Guest star
2018	The Queen of Flow	Himself	Guest star
2018	Simona	Himself	Guest star
2022	Érase una vez... pero ya no	Diego / Maxi	Lead role

=== Realities shows and others ===
Year	Title	Role	Notes
2018	La voz Kids 3	Coach	Winner coach
2019	Viña 2019	Member jury	Event
2019	La voz Kids 4	Coach	3rd place coach
2020	2020 Premios Juventud	Host	Ceremony
2020	La Voz season 7	Advisor of Pablo López	
2021	Conecta y Canta	Host	
2021	2021 Premios Juventud	Host	Ceremony
2022	La Voz Kids season 7	Coach	3rd place coach
2023	La Voz Kids season 8	Coach	Winner coach
2025	La Voz season 12	Coach	Runner-up coach

== Discography ==
- Mantra (2018)
- Fantasía (2019)
- Dharma (2022)
- Milagro (2025)

== Tours ==
- Sebastián Yatra Tour (2018-2019)
- Yatra Yatra Tour (2019-2020)
- Dharma World Tour (2022)
- Entre Tanta Gente Tour (2025-2026)

== Awards and nominations ==
=== ASCAP Latin Awards ===
Year	Recipient(s) and nominee(s)	Category	Result
2018	"Robarte un Beso"	Award Winning Songs	Won
2020	"Date La Vuelta"	Award Winning Songs	Won
2020	"Un Año"	Award Winning Songs	Won

=== Heat Latin Music Awards ===
Year	Nominee / work	Award	Result
2017	"Traicionera"	Best Video	Nominated
2017	Sebastián Yatra	Best Andean Artist	Won
2019	Sebastián Yatra	Best Male Artist	Nominated
2019	Sebastián Yatra	Best Pop Artist	Won
2019	"Por Perro"	Best Video	Nominated
2019	"Robarte un Beso"	Best Collaboration	Nominated

=== Grammy Awards ===
Year	Nominee / work	Award	Result
2020	Fantasía	Best Latin Pop Album	Nominated
2023	Dharma +	Best Latin Pop Album	Nominated

=== Latin Grammy Awards ===
Year	Nominee / work	Award	Result
2017	Sebastián Yatra	Best New Artist	Nominated
2017	Extended Play Yatra	Best Contemporary Pop Vocal Album	Nominated
2018	"Robarte un Beso"	Song of the Year	Nominated
2019	Fantasía	Album of the Year	Nominated
2019	Fantasía	Best Contemporary Pop Vocal Album	Nominated
2019	"Un Año"	Song of the Year	Nominated
2020	"Bonita"	Song of the Year	Nominated
2020	"Bonita"	Best Pop Song	Nominated
2022	Dharma	Album of the Year	Nominated
2022	Dharma	Best Pop Vocal Album	Won
2022	"Tacones Rojos"	Song of the Year	Nominated
2022	"Tacones Rojos"	Best Pop Song	Won

=== Latin American Music Awards ===
Year	Nominee / work	Award	Result
2018	Sebastián Yatra	New Artist of the Year	Won
2018	Mantra	Favorite Album - Pop	Nominated
2018	"Robarte un Beso"	Favorite Song - Pop	Won

=== MTV Europe Music Award ===
Year	Nominee / work	Award	Result
2016	Sebastián Yatra	Best Latin America Central Act	Nominated
2017	Sebastián Yatra	Best Latin America Central Act	Nominated
2018	Sebastián Yatra	Best Latin America Central Act	Won
2019	Sebastián Yatra	Best Latin America Central Act	Won
2020	Sebastián Yatra	Best Latin America Central Act	Won
2021	Sebastián Yatra	Best Latin America Central Act	Won

=== American Music Awards ===
Year	Nominee / work	Award	Result
2022	"Dos Oruguitas"	Favourite Latin Song	Won

=== Premios Lo Nuestro ===
Year	Recipient(s) and nominee(s)	Category	Result
2019	"Ya No Tiene Novio" (with Mau y Ricky)	Video of the Year	Nominated
2020	Sebastián Yatra	Pop/Rock Artist of the Year	Won
2020	"Un Año" (with Reik)	Song of the Year	Nominated
2020	"Un Año" (with Reik)	Single of the Year	Nominated
2020	"Un Año" (with Reik)	Pop/Rock Song of the Year	Won
2020	"Un Año" (with Reik)	Pop/Rock Collaboration of the Year	Nominated
2020	Fantasía	Album of the Year	Nominated
2020	"Runaway" (with Jonas Brothers, Daddy Yankee & Natti Natasha)	Crossover Collaboration of the Year	Nominated
2020	"En Guerra" (with Camilo)	Video of the Year	Nominated
2020	"Date La Vuelta" (with Luis Fonsi & Nicky Jam)	Urban/Pop Song of the Year	Nominated
2020	"Un Año" (with Banda Los Sebastianes)	Regional Mexican Collaboration of the Year	Won
2021	Sebastián Yatra	Artist of the Year	Nominated
2021	Sebastián Yatra	Pop Artist of the Year	Nominated
2021	"Bonita" (with Juanes)	Song of the Year	Nominated
2021	"Bonita" (with Juanes)	Pop Collaboration of the Year	Nominated
2021	"Bonita" (with Juanes)	Pop Song of the Year	Nominated
2021	"No Ha Parado de Llover" (with Maná)	Pop Song of the Year	Nominated
2021	"TBT" (with Rauw Alejandro & Manuel Turizo)	Urban/Pop Song of the Year	Nominated
2022	Sebastián Yatra	Artist of the Year	Nominated
2022	Sebastián Yatra	Pop Artist of the Year	Nominated
2022	"Pareja del Año" (with Myke Towers)	Perfect Mix of The Year	Nominated
2022	"Pareja del Año" (with Myke Towers)	Pop Collaboration of the Year	Won
2023	Sebastián Yatra	Artist of the Year	Nominated
2023	Sebastián Yatra	Male Pop Artist of the Year	Won
2023	"Tacones Rojos"	Song of the Year	Nominated
2023	"Tacones Rojos"	Pop Song of the Year	Won
2023	Dharma	Album of the Year	Nominated
2023	Dharma	Pop Album of the Year	Won
2023	Dharma World Tour	Tour of the Year	Nominated
2023	"Contigo" (with Pablo Alborán)	Pop Collaboration of the Year	Nominated
2023	"Contigo" (with Pablo Alborán)	Pop/Ballad Song of the Year	Won
2023	"TV"	Urban/Pop Song of the Year	Nominated
2024	Sebastián Yatra	Male Pop Artist of the Year	Pending
2024	"Una Noche Sin Pensar"	Pop Song of the Year	Pending
2024	"Vagabundo" (with Beéle & Manuel Turizo)	Urban/Pop Collaboration of the Year	Pending
