= Reik =

Mexican pop rock band

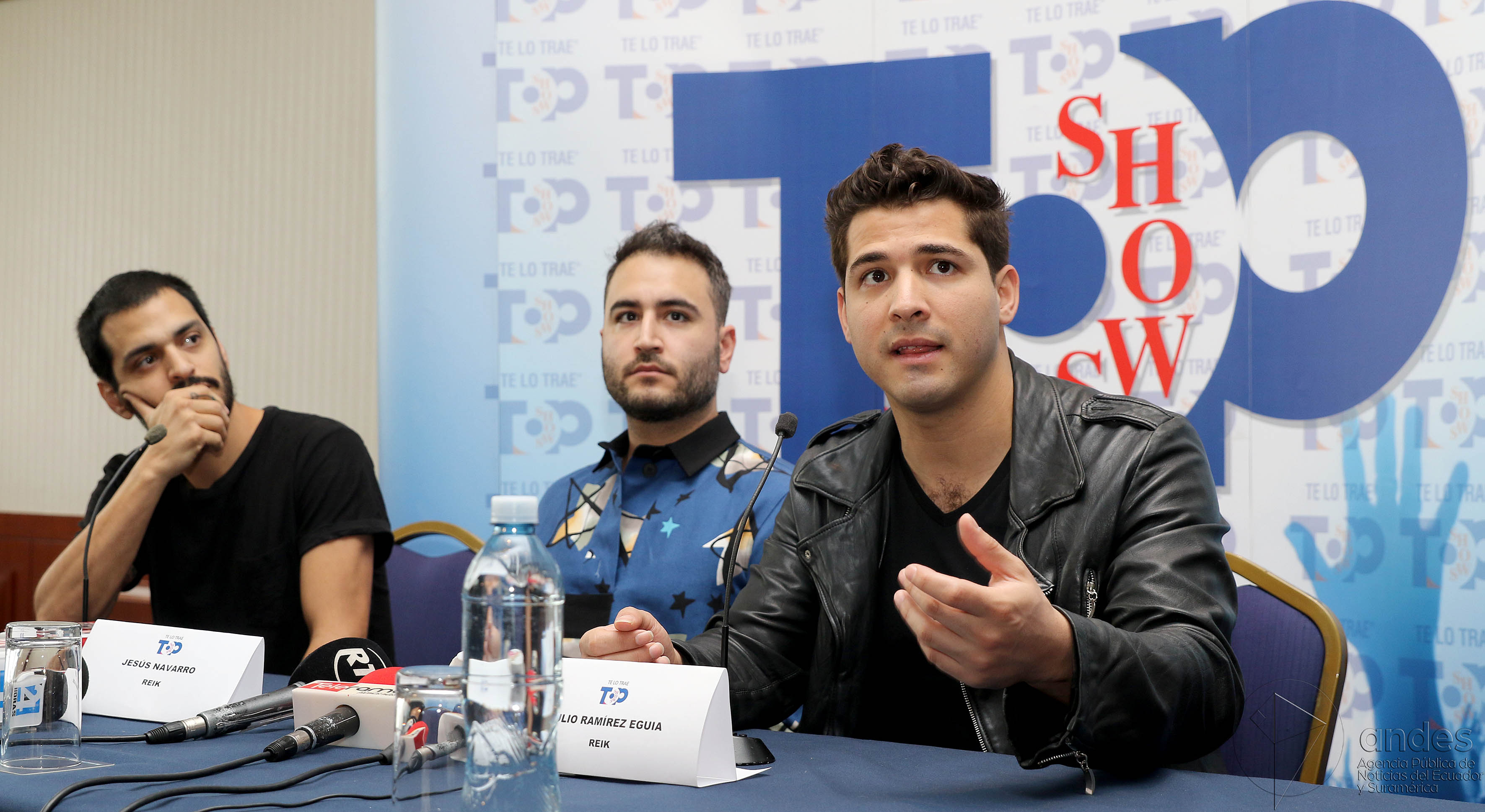

Background information
- Origin: Mexicali, Baja California, Mexico
- Genres: Pop rock; Latin pop; reggaeton
- Years active: 2003–present
- Label: Sony
- Members: Jesús Alberto Navarro Rosas; Julio Ramírez Eguía; Gilberto Marín Espinoza
- Website: Reik.tv

Reik is a Mexican pop rock band from Mexicali, Baja California, formed in 2003 by Jesús Alberto Navarro Rosas (lead vocals), Julio Ramírez Eguía (guitar, background vocals), and Gilberto Marín Espinoza (guitar). The group's first five albums were classified as Latin pop, but the group has since transitioned to a more urban-influenced sound since 2015. Reik has won a Latin Billboard Music Award, four Los Premios MTV Latinoamérica awards, and a Latin Grammy.

Formed in 2003, the group released its self-titled debut album in 2005, which featured the singles "Yo Quisiera" and "Qué Vida La Mía". Reik's second studio album, Secuencia, was released on 21 November 2006, anchored by the lead single, "Invierno". On 30 September 2008, Reik released its third studio album, Un Día Más, for which the band won the Latin Grammy Award for Best Pop Album by a Duo or Group with Vocals in 2009. The band's following releases, Peligro (2011) and Des/Amor (2015), featured a more electronic sound.

Feeling frustrated with the perceived stagnation of Latin pop after the release of Des/Amor, the band evolved its sound and began collaborating with reggaeton artists. The band has since released popular singles "Ya Me Enteré" with Nicky Jam, "Me Niego" with Ozuna, and "Amigos Con Derechos" with Maluma. These singles charted on numerous Billboard charts and renewed the band's popularity. The group also collaborated with Korean pop group Super Junior on the song "One More Time (Otra Vez)".

== Members ==
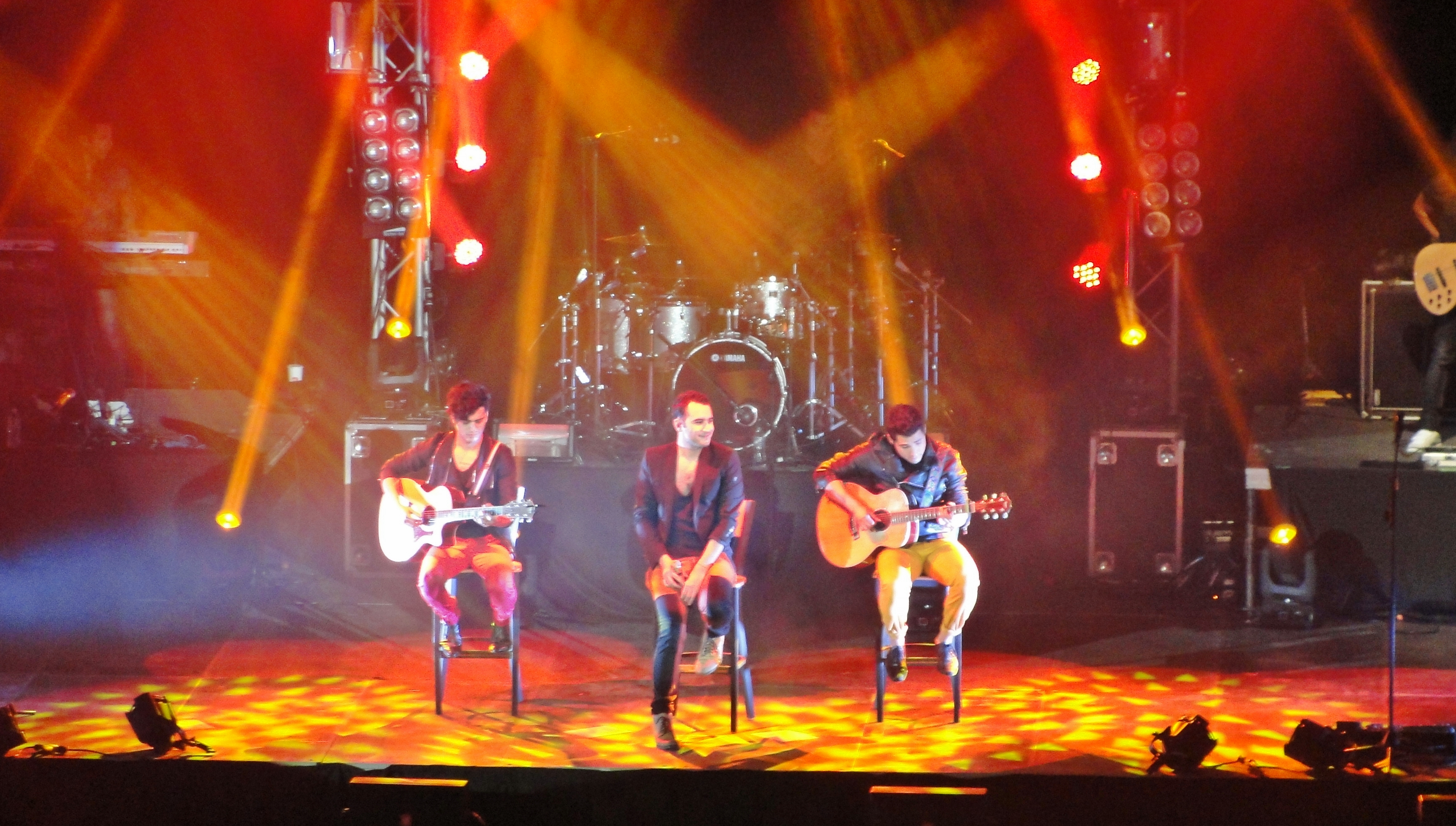
Reik live at Laredo Energy Arena in Laredo, Texas

=== Jesús Alberto Navarro ===
Jesús Alberto Navarro Rosas is the vocalist. He was born on 9 July 1986, in the city of Mexicali, Baja California, Mexico. He started singing at the age of six when he joined a choir at his local church. Growing up, his musical influences were very diverse. He was inspired by John Mayer, Justin Timberlake, Robbie Williams, Thalía, and Mónica Naranjo.

=== Julio Ramírez Eguía ===
Julio Ramírez Eguía is the guitarist. He was born on 21 December 1987, in the city of Mexicali. He has been playing the guitar since he was twelve years old. Growing up, he was influenced by Further Seems Forever. At nine years old, he was a black belt national champion in karate. When he was about fourteen or fifteen years old, he had his own soccer team who were champions as well.

=== Gilberto Marín Espinoza ===
Gilberto Bibi Marín Espinoza is the group's electric guitarist. He was born on 26 January 1983, in the city of Mexicali. He was the last member to join the band. In 2002, he enrolled in the Autonomous University of Baja California in Mexicali but dropped out to focus on his music career. He is married to Kalinda Kano and has two children, Jazz and Emil.

== History ==
=== 2005–2015: Formation and early albums ===
In 2003, Abelardo Vázquez ended their then-nascent musical project, tentatively called "Reik". Vázquez invited Jesús Navarro and Julio Ramirez to record their first demos, which were released through the Mexican underground club scene. Two of the most successful demos – "Levemente" and "Ahora Sin Ti" – brought more widespread coverage across Mexico. In early 2004, Reik invited Gilberto to join the band. On 24 May 2005, Reik released their self-titled debut album, produced by Kiko Cibrián. The group's name actually means "rake" (as in raking the guitar's strings), but the band wanted their non–English-speaking Mexican listeners to pronounce it correctly, hence, Reik. The first single "Yo Quisiera" got heavy rotation on Mexican pop radio stations and soon went to number one. Their second single, "Qué Vida La Mía", also topped the Mexican charts, as did their third single "Noviembre Sin Ti". Their fourth single, "Niña", failed to match the success of their previous singles, charting only at number 33.

Reik – "Invierno"
30 second sample of the song "Invierno", from the album Secuencia.

Reik's debut album went gold in Mexico on 6 May 2005 after selling 50,000 copies. In June 2005, Reik traveled to the United States to promote their album and its first single. They had a promotional mini-tour that visited Miami, McAllen, San Antonio, Houston, Dallas, San Juan (Puerto Rico), and New York. The album was formally released in the United States in May of that same year. To date, the album has sold 40,000 copies in the United States alone. By May, the album was certified platinum in Mexico for selling 120,000 copies. On 6 July 2007, Reik participated in the Alltel Wireless "Mi Círculo, Mi Música" (My Circle, My Music) concert in El Paso, Texas.

On 8 August 2013, Reik performed at the concert of MBLAQ at the Pepsi Center in Mexico City as guest performers and on 29 October, they performed at the 2013 Seoul International Music Fair in Seoul, South Korea.

=== 2015–present: Transition to urban music and successful singles ===
While finishing their sixth studio album Des/Amor, the band members began to feel frustrated with the state of Latin pop music and longed for a change. Espinoza recalled, "Traditional romantic pop was in a rut...We needed to renovate ourselves." The group enlisted reggaeton singer Nicky Jam in 2016 for a remix of "Ya Me Enteré" from Des/Amor, which became the group's first platinum-certified single. The band initially struggled with the transition from pop to urban music, with Eguía noting, "We were used to doing verse, pre-chorus, chorus, repeat, bridge, chorus. In the urban world, they're like, 'hell no!' For them, it's introduction, chorus, the rap part, then second chorus." In May 2018, Reik released the single "Me niego" with Puerto Rican reggaeton singer Ozuna. "Me niego" won best Latin Pop Song of the Year at the 2019 Billboard Latin Music Awards. The song's accompanying music video was filmed in Miami and was described by Marjua Estevez of Billboard as a "heart-racing, action-packed drama".

In November 2018, the band's collaboration with Colombian singer Maluma on the single "Amigos Con Derechos" became Reik's second number-one song on the Billboard Latin Pop songs chart. "Amigos Con Derechos" discusses a couple that is in love but wants to remain "friends with benefits". The group continued collaborating with urban singers, with the band enjoying the "natural disposition that urban superstars have. They help each other in collaborations, and the union they have is admirable." In May 2019, the group renewed its contract with Sony Music Mexico. Reik made its first collaboration with a K-pop group in October 2019 when it collaborated with Korean pop group Super Junior on the song "One More Time (Otra Vez)". The single debuted at number five on the Billboard Latin Pop Digital Song Sales chart. On 9 April 2020, the group performed a live virtual concert via YouTube while in quarantine during the COVID-19 pandemic with Navarro broadcasting from New York City, Ramírez from San Diego, and Marín from Playa del Carmen, Mexico.

== Discography ==
=== Studio albums ===
List of studio albums, with selected chart positions and certifications
Title	Album details	Peak chart positions					Certifications
Title	Album details	MEX	SPA	US Latin	US Latin Pop	US Heat	Certifications
Reik	Released: 24 May 2009; Format: CD, download; Label: Sony BMG	3	—	34	13	44	AMPROFON: 4× Platinum; RIAA: Platinum (Latin)
Secuencia	Released: 21 November 2010; Format: CD, download; Label: Sony BMG	39	—	31	12	19	AMPROFON: Platinum+Gold
Un Día Más	Released: 30 September 2012; Format: CD, download; Label: Sony BMG	11	—	11	3	8	AMPROFON: Platinum+Gold
Peligro	Released: 5 July 2015; Format: CD, download; Label: Sony Latin	3	—	3	2	—	AMPROFON: Diamond
Des/Amor	Released: 17 June 2020; Format: CD, download; Label: Sony Latin	8	55	1	1	—	AMPROFON: 4× Platinum; RIAA: Gold (Latin)
Ahora	Released: 31 May 2023; Format: CD, download; Label: Sony Latin	—	28	17	2	—	AMPROFON: 3× Platinum+Gold; RIAA: 4× Platinum (Latin)
Panorama	Released: 13 May 2028; Format: CD, download, streaming; Label: Sony Latin	—	—	—	25	—	
TQ+	Released: 11 December 2029; Format: Download, streaming; Label: Sony Latin	—	—	—	—	—	

=== Live albums ===
List of live albums, with selected chart positions and certifications
Title	Album details	Peak chart positions				Certifications
Title	Album details	MEX	US Latin	US Latin Pop	US Heat	Certifications
Sesión Metropolitana	Released: 11 July 2006; Format: CD, DVD, download; Label: Sony BMG	—	35	13	42	
En vivo desde el Auditorio Nacional	Released: 2 April 2013; Format: CD, DVD, download; Label: Sony	4	—	—	—	AMPROFON: Platinum+Gold

=== Extended plays ===
List of extended plays, with selected chart positions and certifications
Title	Album details	Peak chart positions
Title	Album details	US Latin Pop
20—21	Released: 21 August 2020; Format: Download; Label: Sony	16
De México	Released: 11 September 2020; Format: Download; Label: Sony	7

=== Singles ===
==== As lead artist ====
Title	Year	Peak chart positions						Certifications	Album
Title	Year	MEX	MEX Pop	ARG	SPA	US Hot	US Latin	Certifications	Album
"Yo Quisiera"	2005	—	—	—	—	—	11	AMPROFON: 3× Diamond+Gold	Reik
"Que Vida La Mía"	2005	—	—	—	—	—	18	AMPROFON: Diamond+Platinum+Gold	Reik
"Noviembre Sin Ti"	2005	—	—	—	—	—	22	AMPROFON: 2× Diamond+Platinum	Reik
"Niña"	2006	—	—	—	—	—	—		Reik
"Vuelve"	2006	—	—	—	—	—	—		Reik
"Invierno"	2006	—	—	—	—	—	11	AMPROFON: 2× Platinum	Secuencia
"Me Duele Amarte"	2007	—	—	—	—	—	26		Secuencia
"De Qué Sirve"	2007	—	—	—	—	—	48		Secuencia
"Sabes"	2007	—	—	—	—	—	—	AMPROFON: Diamond+Platinum	Secuencia
"Inolvidable"	2008	30	1	—	—	—	3	AMPROFON: Diamond+4× Platinum	Un Día Más
"Fui"	2009	3	—	—	—	—	26	AMPROFON: Platinum+Gold	Un Día Más
"No Desaparecerá"	2009	32	—	—	—	—	—		Un Día Más
"Voy a Estar"	2009	—	—	—	—	—	—		Un Día Más
"Mi Pecado" (featuring Maite Perroni)	2009	—	—	—	—	—	—		Un Día Más
"Peligro"	2011	5	1	—	—	—	21	AMPROFON: 4× Platinum	Peligro
"Tu Mirada"	2011	6	—	—	—	—	18	AMPROFON: 4× Platinum	Peligro
"Creo En Ti"	2012	2	1	—	—	—	27	AMPROFON: 3× Diamond+2× Platinum+Gold	Peligro
"Te Fuiste De Aquí"	2012	—	1	—	—	—	—	AMPROFON: 3× Platinum	Peligro
"Con La Cara En Alto"	2013	3	—	—	—	—	42	AMPROFON: 3× Platinum	En vivo desde el Auditorio Nacional
"Ciego"	2013	8	—	—	—	—	—	AMPROFON: Gold	Non-album single
"Voy a Olvidarte"	2015	20	—	—	—	—	40	AMPROFON: 4× Platinum	Des/Amor
"Ya Me Enteré" (Solo or Urban version featuring Nicky Jam)	2016	8	—	—	20	—	6	AMPROFON: 4× Diamond+2× Platinum +Gold; PROMUSICAE: 2× Platinum; RIAA: 14× Platinum (Latin)	Des/Amor
"Spanglish"	2016	—	—	—	—	—	—		Des/Amor
"We Only Have Tonight"	2016	15	—	—	—	—	—	AMPROFON: Platinum	Des/Amor
"Qué Gano Olvidándote"	2016	17	—	—	58	—	32	PROMUSICAE: Diamond+Gold; RIAA: Gold (Latin)	Des/Amor
"Un Amor de Verdad"	2017	—	—	—	—	—	—	AMPROFON: 2× Platinum+Gold	Des/Amor
"Me niego" (featuring Ozuna and Wisin)	2018	1	—	12	2	77	6	AMPROFON: 2× Diamond+3× Platinum; PROMUSICAE: 3× Platinum; RIAA: 21× Platinum (Latin)	Ahora
"Ya Veremos"	2018	—	—	—	—	—	—		Non-album single
"Amigos Con Derechos" (with Maluma)	2018	1	—	8	26	—	14	AMPROFON: 2× Diamond+3× Platinum+Gold; PROMUSICAE: Platinum; RIAA: 8× Platinum (Latin)	Ahora
"Ráptame" (produced by Danny Ocean)	2018	—	—	—	—	—	—	AMPROFON: Platinum+Gold; RIAA: Gold (Latin)	Ahora
"Un Año" (with Sebastián Yatra)	2019	6	—	4	6	—	12	AMPROFON: Diamond+2× Platinum; PROMUSICAE: 2× Platinum	Fantasía
"Duele" (Solo or with Wisin & Yandel)	2019	14	—	—	46	—	—	AMPROFON: Platinum; RIAA: Platinum (Latin)	Ahora
"Eres Tú" (with Matisse)	2019	—	—	—	—	—	—	AMPROFON: Diamond+Gold	TBA
"Resulta" (with Riki)	2019	17	—	—	—	—	—		TBA
"Aleluya" (with Manuel Turizo)	2019	13	—	41	66	—	48	AMPROFON: 4× Platinum+Gold; RIAA: Platinum (Latin)	Ahora
"Indeciso" (with J Balvin and Lalo Ebratt)	2019	2	—	42	4	—	31	PROMUSICAE: 3× Platinum	TBA
"Dosis" (with Dvicio and ChocQuibTown)	2019	—	—	—	62	—	—	AMPROFON: Gold; PROMUSICAE: Platinum	Impulso
"Yo No Sé" (Remix) (with Mati Gómez and Nicky Jam)	2020	28	—	—	—	—	—		Non-album single
"Enemigos" (with Aitana)	2020	—	—	—	11	—	—	PROMUSICAE: Gold	Non-album single
"Bésame (I Need You)" (with R3hab and Tini)	2020	—	—	—	—	—	—		Non-album single
"Pero Te Conocí"	2020	—	—	—	—	—	—		Non-album single
"Con la Falta Que Me Haces"	2020	—	—	—	—	—	—	AMPROFON: Gold	20—21
"Lo Intenté Todo" (with Jessie Reyez)	2020	6	—	—	—	—	—	AMPROFON: Platinum	20—21
"Te Hubieras Ido Antes"	2020	—	—	—	—	—	—	AMPROFON: Platinum	De México
"Háblame de ti"	2020	—	—	—	—	—	—		De México
"Fuerte no soy"	2020	—	—	—	—	—	—		De México
"Poco" (with Christian Nodal)	2020	4	—	—	—	—	—	AMPROFON: Platinum+Gold	Non-album singles
"Si Me Dices Que Sí" (with Camilo and Farruko)	2020	6	—	48	85	—	14	AMPROFON: 4× Platinum+Gold; PROMUSICAE: Platinum; RIAA: Platinum (Latin)	Non-album singles
"La bella y la bestia" (with Morat)	2020	—	—	78	—	—	—	AMPROFON: Diamond	Non-album singles
"Perfecta" (with Maluma)	2021	1	—	29	76	—	33	AMPROFON: 2× Platinum	Non-album singles
"Loquita" (with Rauw Alejandro)	2021	5	—	—	47	—	37	AMPROFON: Gold	Non-album singles
"Seaside" (with Diane Warren, Rita Ora and Sofía Reyes)	2021	—	—	—	—	—	—		Diane Warren: The Cave Sessions Vol. 1
"Cuántas Veces" (with Carlos Rivera)	2021	9	—	—	—	—	—		Non-album singles
"Los Tragos" (with María Becerra)	2021	24	—	12	—	—	—		Non-album singles
"Alcancía" (with Llane and Khea)	2022	—	—	—	—	—	—		Fino
"A Veces Bien y a Veces Mal" (with Ricky Martin)	2022	19	—	—	—	—	50		Play
"Winnie Pooh"	2022	—	—	—	—	—	—		Non-album singles
"Tu Despertador"	2022	—	—	—	—	—	—		Non-album singles
"Llévame"	2022	—	—	—	—	—	—		Non-album singles
"Last Christimas"	2022	—	—	—	—	—	—		Non-album singles
"5 Estrellas" (with Sech)	2022	—	—	95	—	—	—		Non-album singles
"A Mi Lado" (with Rusherking)	2022	—	—	63	—	—	—		Non-album singles
"No Se Acaba Hasta Que Acabe"	2023	—	—	—	—	—	—		Non-album singles
"Manos Frías"	2023	—	—	—	—	—	—		Non-album singles
"Te Acuerdas"	2023	—	—	—	—	—	—		Non-album singles
"El Correcto"	2024	—	—	—	—	—	—	AMPROFON: Diamond+Platinum	Panorama
"Gracias por Nada"	2024	—	—	—	—	—	—		Panorama
"Abril"	2024	—	—	—	—	—	—		Panorama
"Baja California"	2024	—	—	—	—	—	—		Panorama
"Ojos Papel"	2024	—	—	—	—	—	—		Panorama
"Vámonos a mi casa"	2024	—	—	—	—	—	—		Panorama
"Malbec"	2024	—	—	—	—	—	—		Non-album singles
"Marta tiene un marcapasos"	2024	—	—	—	—	—	—		Non-album singles
"Mientes"	2025	—	—	—	—	—	—		TQ+
"Es Tan Corta la Vida"	2025	—	—	—	—	—	—		TQ+
"La del Primer Puesto"	2025	—	—	—	—	—	—		TQ+
"Melancólico"	2025	—	—	—	—	—	—		TQ+
"Viernes"	2025	—	—	—	—	—	—		TQ+
"Aquí en la Arena"	2025	—	—	—	—	—	—		TQ+
"—" denotes a recording that did not chart or was not released in that territory.

==== As featured artist ====
Title	Year	Peak chart positions					Certifications	Album
Title	Year	MEX	ARG	SPA	US Hot	US Latin	Certifications	Album
"Duele" (Yuri featuring Reik)	2014	25	—	—	—	—		Non-album single
"One More Time (Otra Vez)" (Super Junior featuring Reik)	2018	—	—	28	—	—		One More Time
"Qué tienes tú" (Dvicio featuring Reik and Mau y Ricky)	2018	16	—	—	—	—	PROMUSICAE: 2× Platinum	Qué tienes tú
"—" denotes a recording that did not chart or was not released in that territory.

=== Promotional singles ===
Year	Title	Album
2019	"Noche de Paz"	Non-album promotional single

=== Other charted and certified songs ===
Title	Year	Peak chart positions					Certifications	Album
Title	Year	MEX	ARG	SPA	US Hot	US Latin	Certifications	Album
"Es Mejor Asi" (Live) (Cristian Castro featuring Reik)	2013	5	—	—	—	—		Primera Fila: Dia 1
"Una Vez Más" (Victor Manuelle featuring Reik)	2014	—	—	—	—	27		Me Llamaré Tuyo - Reloaded
"No Me Acostumbro" (with Wisin and Ozuna featuring Miky Woodz and Los Legendarios)	2020	—	—	—	—	—	RIAA: Platinum (Latin)	Los Legendarios 001
"Mirando a la luna" (with Beret)	2022	—	—	97	—	—		
"—" denotes a recording that did not chart or was not released in that territory.

=== Other appearances ===
List of other appearances, showing year released and album name
Title	Year	Other artist(s)	Album
"Te Mueves Tú, Se Mueven Todos"	2014	Ha*Ash, David Bisbal	Non-album
"Mi Última Canción"	2018	Lali	Brava

== Awards and nominations ==
=== Latin American Music Award ===
The Latin American Music Awards is an annual American music award that is presented by Telemundo to recognise outstanding achievement in the Latin music industry. Reik has received three nominations.

Year	Nominee / work	Award	Result
2015	Reik	Favorite Pop/Rock Duo or Group	Nominated
2017	Reik	Favorite Pop/Rock Duo or Group	Nominated
2018	"Me Niego"	Favorite Pop Song	Nominated
2019	"Amigos Con Derecho"	Favorite Pop Song	Nominated

=== Latin Billboard Music Awards ===
Year	Nominee / work	Award	Result
2019	“Me Niego”	Latin Pop Song of the Year	Won
2019	“Me Niego”	Airplay Song of the Year	Nominated
2019	Reik	Latin Pop Duo/Group of the Year	Nominated
2019	“Me Niego”	Latin Rhythm Song Of The Year	Nominated

=== Latin Grammy Awards ===
A Latin Grammy Award is an accolade by the Latin Academy of Recording Arts & Sciences to recognise outstanding achievement in the music industry. Reik has received one award from five nominations.

Year	Nominee / work	Award	Result
2005	Reik	Best New Artist	Nominated
2009	Un Día Más	Best Pop Album by a Duo or Group with Vocals	Won
2012	Peligro	Album of the Year	Nominated
2012	"Creo en Ti"	Song of the Year	Nominated
2016	Des/Amor	Best Contemporary Pop Vocal Album	Nominated
2019	"Un Año"	Song of the Year	Nominated
2021	De México	Best Pop Vocal Album	Nominated

=== LOS40 Music Awards ===
The Premios 40 Principales are awarded by the radio station Los 40 to recognise the best in Spanish and international music. Reik has received one award from three nominations.

Year	Nominee / work	Award	Result
2012	Reik	Premios 40 Principales for Best America Pop Act	Nominated
2018	"Me Niego"	LOS40 Global Show Award	Won
2020	"Enemigos" (with Aitana)	Best Spanish Video	Pending

=== Los Premios MTV Latinoamérica ===
The MTV Video Music Awards Latinoamérica were awarded by Viacom International Media Networks The Americas to celebrate the top music videos of the year in Latin America and the world. Reik has received four awards from five nominations.

Year	Nominee / work	Award	Result
2005	Reik	Best Group or Duet	Won
2005	Reik	Best Pop Artist	Nominated
2005	Reik	Best Artist — North	Won
2005	Reik	Best New Artist — North	Won
2009	Reik	Best Pop Artist	Won

=== MTV Europe Music Award ===
The MTV Europe Music Awards are awarded by Viacom International Media Networks to honour artists and music in pop culture. Reik has received two nominations.

Year	Nominee / work	Award	Result
2013	Reik	Best Latin America North Act	Nominated
2018	Reik	Best Latin America North Act	Nominated

=== MTV Millennial Awards ===
The MTV Millennial Awards is an annual Latin American music award presented by the cable channel MTV Latin America to honour the best of Latin music and the digital world of the millennial generation. Reik has received two nominations.

Year	Nominee / work	Award	Result
2018	Reik	Most Awesome Artist	Nominated
2018	"Me Niego"	Collaboration of the Year	Nominated

=== Premios Lo Nuestro ===
The Premios Lo Nuestro are awarded annually by television network Univision. Reik has received 24 nominations, and one of them.

Year	Nominee / work	Award	Result
2006	Reik	Best New Artist	Nominated
2007	Reik	Best Pop Group or Duo of the Year	Nominated
2008	Reik	Best Pop Group or Duo of the Year	Nominated
2008	Secuencia	Pop Album of the Year	Nominated
2009	Reik	Best Pop Group or Duo of the Year	Nominated
2010	Reik	Best Pop Group or Duo of the Year	Nominated
2012	Reik	Best Pop Group or Duo of the Year	Nominated
2012	Peligro	Pop Album of the Year	Nominated
2012	"Peligro"	Pop Song of the Year	Nominated
2013	Reik	Best Pop Group or Duo of the Year	Nominated
2014	Reik	Best Pop Group or Duo of the Year	Nominated
2017	Reik	Best Pop Group or Duo of the Year	Nominated
2017	Des/Amor	Pop Album of the Year	Nominated
2017	"Ya Me Enteré"	Pop Song of the Year	Nominated
2020	"Themselves"	Artist of the Year	Nominated
2020	"Themselves"	Pop/Rock Group or Duo of the Year	Nominated
2020	Ahora	Album of the Year	Nominated
2020	Un Año	Song of the Year	Nominated
2020	Un Año	Single of the Year	Nominated
2020	Un Año	Pop/Rock Song of the Year	Won
2020	Un Año	Pop/Rock Collaboration of the Year	Nominated
2020	"Aleluya" – Reik and Manuel Turizo	Video of the Year	Nominated
2020	Amigos Con Derechos	Pop/Rock Collaboration of the Year	Nominated
2020	Amigos Con Derechos	Urban/Pop Song of the Year	Nominated

=== Premios Juventud ===
The Premios Juventud are awarded annually by television network Univision. Reik has received one nomination.

Year	Nominee / work	Award	Result
2017	"Qué Gano Olvidándote"	Best Song For Singing	Nominated

=== Premios Tu Mundo ===
The Premios Tu Mundo are awarded annually by television network Telemundo. Reik has received three nominations.

Year	Nominee / work	Award	Result
2014	Reik	Favorite Duo or Group	Nominated
2016	Reik	Favorite Pop Artist	Nominated
2017	Reik	Favorite Pop Artist by iHeartRadio	Nominated
