= Chica Ideal (Sebastián Yatra and Guaynaa song) =

2020 single by Sebastián Yatra and Guaynaa

Single by Sebastián Yatra and Guaynaa

from the album Dharma
- Released: October 16, 2020
- Genre: Latin pop; reggaeton
- Length: 3:02
- Label: Universal Latino
- Songwriters: Sebstián Obando; Jean Carlos Santiago; Daniel Pérez; Manuel Bustillo; Andy Clay; Daniel Echeverría Oviedo; Juan Camilo Vargas; Kevyn Cruz
- Producer: Ovy on the Drums

Sebastián Yatra singles chronology
"Corazón Sin Vida" (2020)	"Chica Ideal" (2020)	"Santa Claus Is Comin' to Town" (2020)

Guaynaa singles chronology
"Chama" (2020)	"Chica Ideal" (2020)	"Que Sera?" (2021)

Music video
- "Chica Ideal" on YouTube

"Chica Ideal" (transl. "Ideal Girl") is a song by Colombian singer Sebastián Yatra and Puerto Rican rapper Guaynaa. It was written by Yatra, Guaynaa, Daniel Pérez, Manuel Bustillo, Andy Clay, Juan Camilo Vargas and Keityn. And produced by Ovy on the Drums. Through Universal Music Latino, the song was released on October 16, 2020.

The song interpolates the 2003 song "Quiero Una Chica" by Colombian duo Latin Dreams.

Commercially, the song topped the Costa Rica, El Salvador, Guatemala, Honduras, Puerto Rico, Argentina and US Latin airplay charts while peaking within the top five of every Latin American country. Additionally, it peaked at number eight on the Argentina Hot 100 and Mexico Airplay charts, number ten in Spain, and number thirteen on the US Hot Latin Songs chart.

A remix version of the song with fellow rapper and producer will.i.am of Black Eyed Peas was released in February 2021.

== Music video ==
The music video depicts a "post-COVID-19 pandemic fantasy". Yatra and Guaynaa are seen playing basketball in the year 2020 with a group of people wearing masks. After losing the ball and searching for it in the woods, they wind up at a lit pool party (pandemic-free) in the year 2021.

== Charts ==
Chart (2020–21)	Peak position
Argentina Hot 100 (Billboard)	8
Argentina Airplay (Monitor Latino)	1
Bolivia (Monitor Latino)	2
Chile (Monitor Latino)	5
Colombia (Monitor Latino)	4
Colombia (National-Report)	4
Colombia (National-Report) Remix version	97
Costa Rica (Monitor Latino)	1
Ecuador (Monitor Latino)	2
El Salvador (Monitor Latino)	1
Guatemala (Monitor Latino)	1
Honduras (Monitor Latino)	1
Latin America (Monitor Latino)	4
Mexico (Monitor Latino)	7
Mexico Airplay (Billboard)	8
Nicaragua (Monitor Latino)	4
Panama (Monitor Latino)	3
Paraguay (Monitor Latino)	4
Paraguay (SGP)	14
Peru (Monitor Latino)	2
Puerto Rico (Monitor Latino)	1
Spain (PROMUSICAE)	10
Uruguay (Monitor Latino)	4
US Hot Latin Songs (Billboard)	13
US Latin Airplay (Billboard)	1
US Latin Pop Airplay (Billboard)	1
US Latin Rhythm Airplay (Billboard)	1
Venezuela (Monitor Latino)	5

== Certifications ==
Region	Certification	Certified units/sales
Mexico (AMPROFON)	Diamond	300,000^{‡}
Spain (Promusicae)	3× Platinum	120,000^{‡}
United States (RIAA)	4× Platinum (Latin)	240,000^{‡}
Streaming
Central America (CFC)	3× Platinum	21,000,000^{†}
^{‡} Sales+streaming figures based on certification alone.^{†} Streaming-only figures based on certification alone.

== See also ==
- List of airplay number-one hits in Argentina
- List of Billboard Argentina Hot 100 top-ten singles in 2020
- List of Billboard number-one Latin songs of 2021
