= Peligro (Reik album) =

Studio album by Reik
- Released: July 5, 2011
- Recorded: 2010–2011; Fabrizio Simoncioni recording and mixing; (Tornillo, Texas)
- Genre: Latin pop; pop rock
- Length: 48:06 (57:54 with bonus tracks)
- Label: Sony Latin
- Producer: Ettore Grenci; Kiko Cibrián; Rey Cachorro Palacios

Reik chronology
Un Día Más (2008)	Peligro (2011)	En vivo desde el Auditorio Nacional (2013)

Special edition cover

Singles from Peligro
- 1. "Peligro" Released: April 4, 2011; 2. "Tu Mirada" Released: August 15, 2011; 3. "Creo En Ti" Released: January 2, 2012; 4. "Te Fuiste de Aquí" Released: July 9, 2012

Professional ratings
Review scores
Source	Rating
AllMusic	3/5 stars

Peligro is the fourth studio album from Mexican Latin pop group Reik, released on July 5, 2011, through Sony Music Latin. According to the band, the album has a more aggressive, experimental and electronic sound than their previous productions.

== Background ==
For this album the members of the pop trio wanted to venture into more adventurous sonic terrain, which not only targeted at a remote location in Tornillo (Texas), but also recruited several producers to find that new sound they sought in their new songs. Rey Palacios (Julieta Venegas, Belanova, Andrés Calamaro), Kiko Cibrián (Luis Miguel, Rocío Dúrcal) and Ettore Grenci (Yuridia, Kalimba Marichal) were selected to make the new delivery from the band, a little more classical, without losing that romantic touch to their well-known romantic ballads.

"The first single "Peligro" is the most experimental song on the album. Acoustic instruments still exist and there are also ballads. We remain being ourselves, but we decided to just make things a little more danceable. It's good to have songs that put people in a good mood," said member Bibi, at a press conference held upon the album's release.

Julio recalls that he and his friends traveled to Argentina, Los Angeles and New Jersey to find the place from which to create their new songs, but it was the tranquility in Tornillo, Texas which led them to choose the location as their site for work.

"We wanted to live that experience. We were in a residential studio, I think is the biggest in the world. We had different schedules, but most importantly, we achieved that communion as a group we were looking for," said the guitarist.

Reik returned to work with Mexican musician and producer Rey Palacios, who had participated in the group's third album, Un Día Más (2008).

Being a figure of great presence in the Mexican music scene, producer Rey Palacios, was able to summon the help of Ale Sergi (Miranda!) to co-write the tracks "Igual a nada" and "Cálido y rojo" with him.

Regarding the first promotional video, "Peligro", directed by TV producer Pedro Torres, Reik clarified that the "steamy" scenes in the video were not there to offend anyone. For this clip, the trio worked with sensual Venezuelan model Eglantina Zingg. "Eglantina is our friend of two years. I was stubborn with the idea that she'd get the part, although there were suggestions that a Brazilian model would work in her place. It was a little complicated because Eglantina was in Caracas, but in the end, were able to coordinate and everything turned out wonderfully," concluded Jesús.

== Track listing ==
No.	Title	Writer(s)	Length
1.	"Déjate Llevar"	Gilberto Marín; Jesús Navarro; Julio Ramírez; Kiko Cibrián	3:16
2.	"A Ciegas"	Ettore Grenci; Jesús Navarro; Julio Ramírez; Mónica Vélez; Ximena Muñoz	3:43
3.	"Nada"	Ettore Grenci; Jesús Navarro; Kiko Cibrián; Mónica Vélez	3:12
4.	"Peligro"	Ettore Grenci; Rey Palacios; Jesús Navarro	3:41
5.	"Déjame Ir"	Cesar Miranda; Gustavo Cuauhtemoc; Jesús Navarro	4:11
6.	"Igual a Nada"	Alex Sergi; Rey Palacios; Sebastian Schon	3:11
7.	"Irreversible"	Ettore Grenci; Fernando Chavez "fech"; Julio Ramírez; Mónica Vélez	4:01
8.	"Mi Tormenta Favorita"	Ettore Grenci; Mónica Vélez	3:12
9.	"Si Te Vas"	Cesar Miranda; Julio Ramírez	3:07
10.	"Cálido y Rojo"	Alex Sergi; Rey Palacios	3:18
11.	"Adicto a Ti"	Cesar Miranda; Gilberto Marín; Kiko Cibrián; Mónica Vélez	3:31
12.	"No Te Quiero Olvidar"	Gen Rubin; Gilberto Marín; Jesús Navarro; Julio Ramírez	3:42
13.	"Creo En Ti"	Gilberto Marín; Julio Ramírez; Kiko Cibrián; Mónica Vélez; Anaís Loz	2:43
14.	"Tu Mirada"	Rey Palacios; Cristian Stambuk; Sebastian Schon	3:20

iTunes bonus track
No.	Title	Writer(s)	Length
15.	"Peligro (MasterFrenc remix)"	Ettore Grenci	6:09
16.	"Play With Fire ("No Te Quiero Olvidar" English version)"	Gen Rubin; Gilberto Marín; Jesús Navarro; Julio Ramírez	3:40
17.	"Te Fuiste de Aquí"	Gilberto Marín; Jesús Navarro; Julio Ramírez	3:45

== Charts ==
=== Weekly charts ===
Chart (2011)	Peak position
Mexican Albums (Top 100 Mexico)	3
US Top Latin Albums (Billboard)	3
US Latin Pop Albums (Billboard)	2

=== Year-end charts ===
Chart (2011)	Position
US Top Latin Albums (Billboard)	64

=== Certifications ===
Region	Certification	Certified units/sales
Mexico (AMPROFON)	Diamond	300,000^{‡}
^{‡} Sales+streaming figures based on certification alone.
