= List of Ricky Martin live performances =

List of live performances by Ricky Martin

Ricky Martin live performances
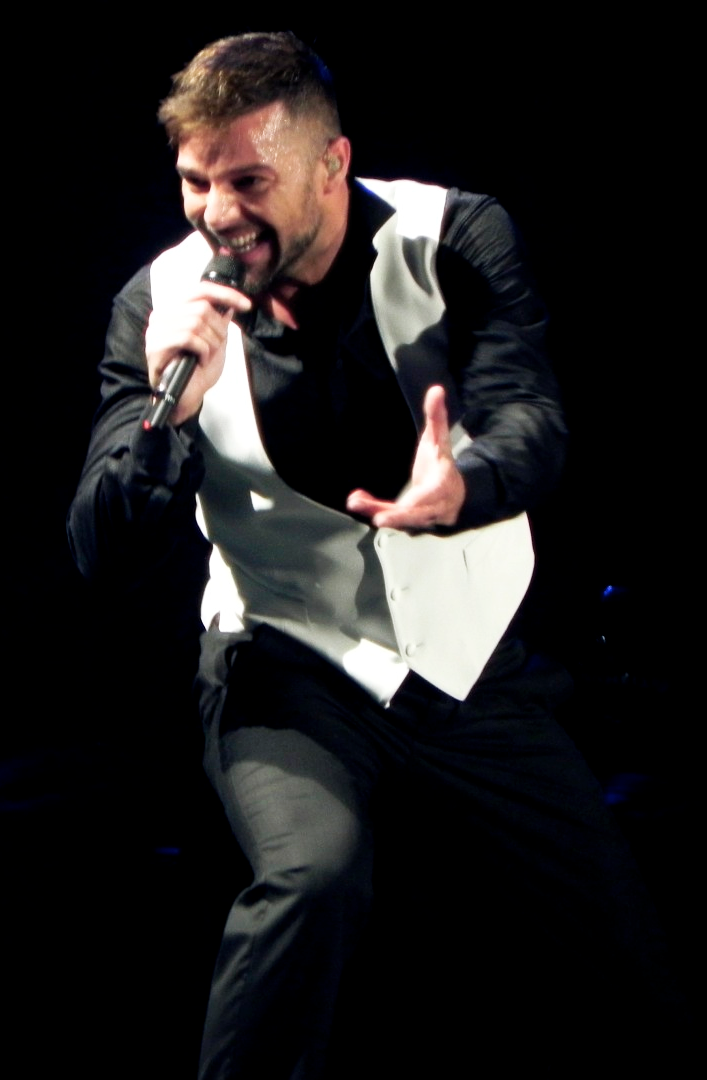
- Ricky Martin performing during the Música + Alma + Sexo World Tour in 2011
- Concert tours: 13
- Co-headlining concert tours: 1
- Concert residencies: 1
- Award shows: 25

Puerto Rican recording artist Ricky Martin has embarked on fourteen concert tours over his musical career. His debut tour, Ricky Martin (1992), only consisted of shows in Latin America, in support of his debut studio album, Ricky Martin (1991). From 1993–1994, he embarked on his second Latin American tour, Me Amaras, to promote his sophomore record of the same name (1993).

In September 1995, Martin released his third studio album, A Medio Vivir. He embarked on his third concert tour, A Medio Vivir, one month later, in October 1995. The tour lasted for more than two years and visited Europe, Latin America and the United States. A DVD, Europa: European Tour, was released on July 3, 2001, and features the show from his sold-out tour European tour in 1997.

While touring in 1997, Martin had returned to the studio to record new material for his fourth studio album, saying that the experience of touring and recording simultaneously was "brutal and incredibly intense". The album, titled Vuelve, was released on February 12, 1998. Martin then embarked on a fourth tour in Asia, South America, and the US. Martin's fifth concert tour, the Livin' la Vida Loca Tour (1999–2000) was launched in support of his debut English-language/bilingual studio album Ricky Martin (1999); this was his first major world tour, running for roughly a year from October 1999 until October 2000. It covered four continents: North America, Europe, Asia and Australia. For the American leg, a then-up-and-coming vocalist named Jessica Simpson was featured as the opening act. Simpson subsequently experienced mainstream success during and after the tour.

After five years without touring, and after having experienced significant crossover success in the American music market (amongst others), Martin embarked on his sixth tour, One Night Only with Ricky Martin, in support of his eighth studio album, Life (2005). The tour visited the Americas, Europe, Asia and Africa, with 53 shows performed. In February 2007, Martin embarked on his seventh tour, the Black and White Tour, to further promote his first live album, MTV Unplugged (2006).

Música + Alma + Sexo was Martin’s eighth concert tour, in support of his ninth studio album, Música + Alma + Sexo (2011). It began with a series of concerts in Puerto Rico and North America, with international dates later in the year. After visiting 28 countries throughout the Americas and Europe, Ricky Martin formally ended the tour on November 12, 2011, back again in his home country of Puerto Rico, at the iconic Coliseo de Puerto Rico José Miguel Agrelot. In October 2013, he began his ninth concert tour, Ricky Martin Live in Newcastle, Australia, and continued with dates in the Americas as well as the Mawazine Festival in Rabat, Morocco.

In 2014, Martin embarked on a Mexican tour, Live in Mexico. In February 2015, he released his tenth studio album, A Quien Quiera Escuchar. To further promote the record, Martin embarked on his tenth concert tour, the One World Tour, in October 2015. The tour lasted for nearly three years, during which he performed 105 shows across Oceania, North America, South America, Europe and Asia. His performance in Zócalo, Mexico City, was attended by more than 100,000 people, and is among the highest-attended concerts of all time.

In 2017, Martin headlined his first Las Vegas residency, All In, at the Park Theater (now Dolby Live) at the Monte Carlo Resort and Casino. In 2018, he started Ricky Martin en Concierto. Two years later, Martin announced his new album would be released in 2020 and he started his world tour, the Movimiento Tour, on February 7, 2020. However, due to the COVID-19 pandemic, and subsequent personal experiences, Martin decided to split the tour's associated album release into two extended plays, Pausa and Play, and postponed several of his tour dates. He had also planned to embark on a co-headlining tour with Spanish singer Enrique Iglesias. That tour was rescheduled to begin in Glendale, Arizona, on September 3, 2021, and concluded in Orlando, Florida, on October 30, 2021.

In addition to his tours and residencies, Martin has performed many of his songs on numerous television programs and awards shows. One of his earliest career-changing performances was of "The Cup of Life" at the 41st Annual Grammy Awards, in February 1999, which has been called the "greatest awards show performance of all time" by a Latin artist; the appearance was in support of his upcoming crossover album, and was critically acclaimed. The performance is thought to have effectively ushered-in the late-1990s "Latin explosion" in pop music, which saw a noted rise in popularity among Latino and Hispanic artists, such as Shakira, Jennifer Lopez, Enrique Iglesias, Marc Anthony, and Christina Aguilera.

== Concert tours ==
List of concert tours, with the duration, number of shows, and descriptions
Year	Title	Duration	Number of performances
1992	Ricky Martin Tour	1992 (Latin America)	/
The Ricky Martin Tour was Martin's debut tour. It promoted his first studio album Ricky Martin (1991). The tour visited only Latin America.
1993–1994	Me Amaras Tour	1993–1994 (Latin America)	/
The Me Amaras Tour was Martin's second tour. It promoted his second studio album Me Amaras (1993). The tour visited only Latin America.
1995–1997	A Medio Vivir Tour	October 19, 1995 – February 24, 1996 (Latin America); March 23, 1996 – March 30, 1996 (North America); April 10, 1996 – May 16, 1997 (Latin America); July 7, 1997 – December 18, 1997 (Europe)	63
The A Medio Vivir Tour was Martin's third tour. It promoted his third studio album, A Medio Vivir (1995). The tour visited Europe, Latin America and the United States.
1998	Vuelve World Tour	February 13, 1998 – September 5, 1998 (Latin America); October 23, 1998 – October 31, 1998 (North America); November 12, 1998 (Latin America); November 17, 1998 – November 19, 1998 (Australia); November 22, 1998 – December 6, 1998 (Asia)	20
The Vuelve World Tour was Martin's fourth tour. It promoted his fourth studio album, Vuelve (1998). The tour visited Latin America, Asia, and the US. The day after releasing the album, Martin held two sold-out concerts at the 30,000-seat Hiram Bithorn Stadium in Puerto Rico on February 13 and February 14, 1998, respectively. In South America, he performed in Argentina, Chile, Colombia, Peru, and Venezuela. His shows in Venezuela and Peru were held as benefit concerts, the former as part of "A Venezuela Without Drugs" campaign, and the latter for the Foundation for Children of Peru. Martin also participated in the second annual "Festival Presidente de Música Latino" in the Dominican Republic on June 26, 1997, where he had top billing for the event. In Asia, he toured in China, Japan, Malaysia, and Singapore. A concert was planned for Indonesia in May of the same year but was cancelled because of anti-government rioting. In the US, he performed at the Miami Arena in Miami, the Arrowhead Pond in Los Angeles, and Madison Square Garden in New York. His sold-out performance at the Arrowhead Pond grossed over $446,805 which landed it at number 10 on the Boxscore chart on November 7, 1998. For this achievement, the concert's promoter, the Nederlander Organization, presented Martin with the Estrella del Pond Award. His show at Madison Square Garden grossed $632,180 placing it second on the Boxscore chart of November 10.
1999–2000	Livin' la Vida Loca Tour	October 20, 1999 – March 27, 2000 (North America); April 26, 2000 – May 13, 2000 (Europe); June 9, 2000 – July 27, 2000 (North America); September 26, 2000 – October 11, 2000 (Asia); October 15, 2000 – October 25, 2000 (Oceania)	103
The Livin' la Vida Loca Tour was Martin's fifth tour. It promoted his first English-language studio album Ricky Martin (1999). The tour visited North America, Europe, Asia and Australia. According to 2000 year-end report, Ricky Martin had the 10th highest-grossing tour in the US, with 44 shows grossing $36.3 million and drawing an audience of 617,488. That October, attendance and sales data reported from 60 concert dates in the United States, Canada and Mexico show the tour grossed $51.3 million and drew 875,151 fans, according to Billboard Boxscore, International dates, not reported to Boxscore would push Martin's grosses higher.
2005–2006	One Night Only with Ricky Martin	November 13, 2005 – December 8, 2005 (Latin America); January 15, 2006 – February 15, 2006 (North America); February 18, 2006 – February 19, 2006 (Latin America); February 25, 2006 (Asia); April 21, 2006 – May 22, 2006 (Europe); May 27, 2006 (Asia); May 29, 2006 (Africa); June 3, 2006 (Asia); June 7, 2006 (Europe)	53
The One Night Only with Ricky Martin was Martin's sixth tour. It promoted his 2005 album Life. Martin kicked off his tour on November 15, 2005, in Mexico, and the tour visited the Americas, Europe, Asia and Africa.
2007	Black and White Tour	February 9, 2007 – March 31, 2007 (Latin America); April 17, 2007 – May 27, 2007 (North America); June 27, 2007 – July 26, 2007 (Europe); August 10, 2007 – September 27, 2007 (Latin America); September 29, 2007 – October 14, 2007 (North America)	80
The Black and White Tour was Martin's seventh tour. It promoted his first live album MTV Unplugged. The tour kicked off with four nights at the José Miguel Agrelot Coliseum in San Juan on February 9, 2007, and travelled to several countries in South and Central America, and also visited North America and Europe. On Billboard's Top 25 Tours of the first half of 2007 (between November 15, 2006, and May 15, 2007), Ricky Martin ranked at number 19. The tour grossed $13,124,673, with capacity 273,899 and attendance 250,463. Five shows out of twenty two were sold out. And on Billboard's Top 25 Boxscores of the same period, Martin ranked at number 15 with his Coliseo de Puerto Rico concerts which grossed $3,988,207.
2011	Música + Alma + Sexo World Tour	March 25, 2011 – May 23, 2011 (North America); June 18, 2011 – July 15, 2011 (Europe); August 26, 2011 – November 12, 2011 (Latin America)	82
The Música + Alma + Sexo World Tour was Martin's eighth tour. It promoted his ninth studio album, Música + Alma + Sexo (2011). It began with a series of concerts in Puerto Rico and North America, with international dates later in the year. The tour was his first in four years, the previous being the 2007 Black and White Tour. On the Pollstar Top 50 Worldwide Tours of the first half of 2011, Ricky Martin ranked at number 42. His tour grossed $17.7, with 37 shows and 246,141 total tickets. After visiting 28 countries throughout North America, Europe and Latin America, Ricky Martin formally ended his tour on November 12, 2011, in his homeland, Puerto Rico, at the Coliseo de Puerto Rico José Miguel Agrelot. The tour was planned to close on November 19, 2011, in Santo Domingo, however it got cancelled The tour visited the Americas and Europe.
2013–2014	Ricky Martin Live	October 3, 2013 – October 20, 2013 (Australia); December 8, 2013 – December 28, 2013 (North America); February 21, 2014 – February 23, 2014 (South America); June 8, 2014 (Africa)	14
The Ricky Martin Live was Martin's ninth tour. It promoted his compilation album, Greatest Hits: Souvenir Edition. The tour visited the Americas, Australia and Africa.
2014	Live in Mexico	October 3, 2014 – December 20, 2014 (Latin America)	24
The Live in Mexico was Martin's tenth tour and visited only Mexico.
2015–2018	One World Tour	April 17, 2015 – May 8, 2015 (Oceania); June 10, 2015 – February 6, 2016 (North America); February 9, 2016 (South America); February 12, 2016 – February 14, 2016 (North America); February 20, 2016 – March 25, 2016 (South America); August 24, 2016 – August 27, 2016 (North America); September 8, 2016 – September 10, 2016 (Europe); September 12, 2016 – September 14, 2016 (Asia); September 16, 2016 – September 23, 2016 (Europe); October 25, 2016 – November 6, 2016 (South America); November 11, 2016 – May 6, 2017 (North America); May 23, 2017 – June 11, 2017 (Europe); July 7, 2017 – November 25, 2017 (North America); February 23, 2018 (Asia)	131
The One World Tour was Martin's eleventh tour. It promoted his tenth studio album, A Quien Quiera Escuchar (2015). The tour began in Auckland, New Zealand at the Vector Arena on April 17, 2015, and was extended to conclude in the Dubai International Jazz Festival in February 2018. It visited the Americas, Oceania, Asia and Europe. The One World Tour grossed $57.4 million with a total attendance of 802,931 from 105 shows reported in 2015 and 2016.
2018–2019	Ricky Martin en Concierto	August 14, 2018 – September 9, 2018 (Europe); November 3, 2018 – September 21, 2019 (Latin America)	15
The Ricky Martin en Concierto was Martin's twelfth tour and visited Latin America and Europe.
2020	Movimiento Tour	February 7, 2020 – March 7, 2020 (Latin America)	11
The Movimiento Tour was Martin's thirteenth tour. It began in San Juan, Puerto Rico at the José Miguel Agrelot Coliseum on February 7, 2020, and was supposed to promote his eleventh studio album Movimientio, while because of the COVID-19 pandemic and subsequent personal experiences, Martin decided to split the tour's associated album in two extended plays, Pausa and Play. Although the tour was going to be a world tour, it visited only some parts of Latin America, due to the COVID-19 concert cancellations.
2022–2023	Sinfónico Tour	July 22, 2022-September 2023 (US, Europe, Latin America)	TBD
The Sinfónico Tour is Ricky Martin's newest tour. It kicked off in the Hollywood Bowl in July 2022 and continued in Europe and South America.

== Co-headlining concert tours ==
Year	Title	Co-headliner	Duration	Number of performances
2021	Enrique Iglesias and Ricky Martin Live in Concert	Enrique Iglesias	September 3, 2021 – October 30, 2021 (North America)	25
The Enrique Iglesias and Ricky Martin Live in Concert is Martin's first co-headlining tour. The tour will begin on September 3, 2021, and will visit only North America.
2023	Trilogy Tour	Enrique Iglesias, Pitbull	October 14, 2023 – December 10, 2023 (North America)	TBD
The Trilogy Tour is Martin's second co-headlining tour. The tour will begin in October 2023 and will visit only North America.

== Concert residencies ==
List of concert residencies, with the duration, number of shows, and descriptions
Year	Title	Duration	Shows
2017-2018	All In	April 5, 2017 – June 3, 2018 (Las Vegas, Nevada)	30
The first concert residency by Martin, All In took place at the Park Theater at Monte Carlo Resort and Casino.

== Notable concerts ==
Year	Title	Dates	Release format(s)
2006	MTV Unplugged	August 17, 2006 (Miami)	DVD/Live album (see MTV Unplugged)

== Performances at award shows ==
List of performances at award shows, with the country of origin and performed songs
Date	Event	Country	Performed song(s)	Ref.
February 24, 1999	1999 Grammy Awards	United States	"La Copa De La Vida"	
May 5, 1999	1999 World Music Awards	Monaco	"Livin' la Vida Loca"	
May 25, 1999	1999 Blockbuster Entertainment Awards	United States	"Livin' la Vida Loca"	
September 9, 1999	1999 MTV Video Music Awards	United States	Medley: "She's All I Ever Had" / "Livin' la Vida Loca"	
December 8, 1999	1999 Billboard Music Awards	United States	"Shake Your Bon-Bon"	
February 23, 2000	2000 Grammy Awards	United States	"María"	
March 3, 2000	2000 BRIT Awards	England	Medley: "Livin' la Vida Loca" / "The Cup of Life" / "María"	
March 9, 2000	2000 ECHO Awards	Germany	"Private Emotion" (with Meja)	
September 13, 2000	2000 Latin Grammy Awards	United States	"Oye Como Va" (with Celia Cruz and Gloria Estefan) (tribute to Tito Puente)	
November 16, 2000	2000 MTV Europe Music Awards	Sweden	"She Bangs"	
December 5, 2000	2000 Billboard Music Awards	United States	"She Bangs"	
January 8, 2001	2001 American Music Awards	United States	"Nobody Wants To Be Lonely"	
February 6, 2001	2001 Goldene Kamera Awards	Germany	"Nobody Wants To Be Lonely"	
March 23, 2001	2001 Premios de la Música	Spain	"Cambia la Piel" (with Estrella Morente and Ketama)	
April 10, 2001	2001 Blockbuster Entertainment Awards	United States	"Loaded"	
April 22, 2001	2001 Logie Awards	Australia	Medley: "She Bangs" / "Loaded"	
May 2, 2001	2001 World Music Awards	Monaco	"Nobody Wants To Be Lonely" (with Christina Aguilera); "Loaded"	
April 19, 2003	2003 TMF Awards	Netherlands	"The Cup of Life"; "Jaleo"	
May 8, 2003	2003 Latin Billboard Music Awards	United States	"Tal Vez"	
September 3, 2003	2003 Latin Grammy Awards	United States	"Asignatura Pendiente"	
October 23, 2003	2003 MTV Video Music Awards Latinoamérica	United States	"Matador (Los Fabulosos Cadillacs song)"	
February 26, 2004	2004 Premio Lo Nuestro	United States	Medley: "Y Todo Queda en Nada" / "Jaleo"	
September 30, 2005	2005 NRJ Ciné Awards	France	"I Don't Care" (with Amerie)	
December 19, 2005	2005 Radio Music Awards	United States	"Drop It on Me"	
January 21, 2006	2006 NRJ Music Awards	France	"I Don't Care"	
November 2, 2006	2006 Latin Grammy Awards	United States	Medley: "Tu Recuerdo" (with La Mari and Tommy Torres) / "Pégate"	
November 23, 2006	2006 Premios Ondas	Spain	"Tu Recuerdo" (with La Mari)	
November 8, 2007	2007 Latin Grammy Awards	United States	Medley: "Lola, Lola" / "La Bomba" (with Blue Man Group)	
November 11, 2010	2010 Latin Grammy Awards	United States	"Lo Mejor de Mi Vida Eres Tú" (with Natalia Jiménez)	
February 17, 2011	2011 Premio Lo Nuestro	United States	"Lo Mejor de Mi Vida Eres Tú" (Solo Version - Remix)	
July 21, 2011	2011 Premios Juventud	United States	Medley: "Frío" (feat Wisin & Yandel) / "Más"	
July 18, 2013	2013 Premios Juventud	United States	"Come with Me" (Spanglish Version)	
March 29, 2014	2014 Chinese Music Awards	China	"Vida", "Come with Me"	
May 18, 2014	2014 Billboard Music Awards	United States	"Vida"	
November 20, 2014	2014 Latin Grammy Awards	United States	"Adiós"; "Perdón" (with Camila)	
February 19, 2015	2015 Premio Lo Nuestro	United States	"Disparo al Corazón"	
July 16, 2015	2015 Premios Juventud	United States	"La Mordidita" (with Yotuel)	
November 19, 2015	2015 Latin Grammy Awards	United States	Medley: "Disparo al Corazón" / "La Mordidita"; "Que Se Sienta El Deseo" (with Wisin)	
February 23, 2017	2017 Premio Lo Nuestro	United States	"Vente Pa' Ca"	
April 26, 2018	2018 Billboard Latin Music Awards	United States	"Fiebre" (with Wisin & Yandel)	
February 10, 2019	2019 Grammy Awards	United States	"Havana", "Pégate", "Mi Gente" (with Camila Cabello, J Balvin, Arturo Sandoval and Young Thug)	
November 14, 2019	2019 Latin Grammy Awards	United States	"Cántalo" (with Residente and Bad Bunny)	
February 20, 2020	2020 Lo Nuestro Awards	United States	"Tiburones"	
November 19, 2020	2020 Latin Grammy Awards	United States	Medley: "Recuerdo" (with Carla Morrison) / "Tiburones"	
April 15, 2021	2021 Latin American Music Awards	United States	"Canción Bonita" (with Carlos Vives)	
July 22, 2021	2021 Premios Juventud	United States	"Qué Rico Fuera" (with Paloma Mami)	
