= Ricky Martin Live =

2013–14 concert tour by Ricky Martin

- Tour by Ricky Martin
- Promotional poster for the Australian leg of tour
- Location: Oceania; North America; Africa; South America
- Associated album: Greatest Hits: Souvenir Edition
- Start date: October 3, 2013
- End date: June 8, 2014
- Legs: 4
- No. of shows: 14

Ricky Martin concert chronology
- Música + Alma + Sexo World Tour (2011); Ricky Martin Live (2013–14); Ricky Martin Live in Mexico (2014)

Ricky Martin Live was the ninth concert tour by Puerto Rican singer Ricky Martin. It supported his compilation album, Greatest Hits: Souvenir Edition. The tour started in Newcastle on October 3, 2013 and continued across Australia for three weeks before coming to a close on October 20, 2013 in Melbourne. He continued throwing concerts in venues in the Americas in the later months, as well as participating in the Mawazine Festival in Rabat, Morocco.

== Background and development ==
Between April and June 2013, Martin was one of the coaches on the second season of The Voice in Australia. In late May 2013, it was announced that he will tour Australia in October 2013, for the first time in over ten years. Martin will promote his already Gold-certified Greatest Hits: Souvenir Edition compilation and his new top-ten single "Come with Me". After originally announcing five concerts, four more dates were added later, including second concerts in Sydney Super Dome and Rod Laver Arena.

== Critical response ==
The Australian leg has received positive reviews from music critics. Helen Gregory from The Newcastle Herald wrote that Martin has delivered one of Newcastle’s biggest shows of the year, fulfilling his promise to have the audience "sweating, dancing and shaking their bon bons in a night of intense adrenalin." This was Martin at his best; "energetic, engaging, charming and still at the helm of a powerhouse voice, even when swivelling his hips and samba dancing his way through a 95 minute set." The show was a great production, complete with lights, video, ten full or partial costume changes, eight dancers and a band composed of musicians from all over the world. Reviews by Take 40 Australia, Ninemsn and Glam Adelaide were also enthusiastic.

== Opening act ==
- Timomatic (select dates)
- DJ Kid Massive (Sydney–October 18)

== Setlist ==
The following setlist was performed at the Allphones Arena, in Sydney, Australia on October 18, 2013. It does not represent all concerts during the tour.

1. "Instrumental Introduction"
2. "Come with Me"
3. "Shake Your Bon-Bon"
4. "It's Alright"
5. "Vuelve"
6. "Video Sequence"
7. "Livin' la Vida Loca"
8. "She Bangs"
9. "Loaded"
10. "Video Sequence"
11. "She's All I Ever Had" (performed with Luke Kennedy)
12. "Come to Me" / "Private Emotion" (performed with Kennedy and Ms Murphy)
13. "Nobody Wants to Be Lonely" (performed with Kennedy and Murphy)
14. "Video Sequence"
15. "Más"
16. "La Bomba"
17. "Lola, Lola"
18. "Pégate" (contains excerpts from Por Arriba, Por Abajo)
19. "María"
  Encore
20. "Video Sequence"
21. "The Cup of Life"

== Tour dates ==
Date	City	Country	Venue
Oceania
October 3, 2013	Newcastle	Australia	Newcastle Entertainment Centre
October 5, 2013	Melbourne	Australia	Rod Laver Arena
October 10, 2013	Adelaide	Australia	Adelaide Entertainment Centre
October 12, 2013	Perth	Australia	Perth Arena
October 14, 2013	Sydney	Australia	The Star Event Centre
October 16, 2013	Brisbane	Australia	Brisbane Entertainment Centre
October 18, 2013	Sydney	Australia	Sydney SuperDome
October 19, 2013	Sydney	Australia	Sydney SuperDome
October 20, 2013	Melbourne	Australia	Rod Laver Arena
North America
December 8, 2013	Uniondale	United States	Nassau Veterans Memorial Coliseum
December 28, 2013	Cancun	Mexico	Moon Palace Hotel
South America
February 21, 2014	Punta del Este	Uruguay	Conrad Hotel
February 23, 2014	Viña del Mar	Chile	Quinta Vergara
Africa
June 8, 2014	Rabat	Morocco	Mawazine Festival

=== Box office score data ===
Venue	City	Tickets sold / available	Gross revenue
Newcastle Entertainment Centre	Newcastle	2,489 / 4,095 (61%)	$224,639
Rod Laver Arena	Melbourne	22,499 / 22,499 (100%)	$2,651,000
Perth Arena	Perth	9,944 / 10,466 (95%)	$1,175,340
Brisbane Entertainment Centre	Brisbane	7,664 / 7,928 (97%)	$957,988
Allphones Arena	Sydney	24,717 / 25,834 (96%)	$3,148,610
TOTAL		67,313 / 70,822 (95%)	$8,157,577
