= Movimiento Tour =

2020 concert tour by Ricky Martin

- Continental tour by Ricky Martin
- Promotional poster for the tour
- Location: North America; South America
- Associated album: Pausa (EP)
- Start date: February 7, 2020
- End date: March 7, 2020
- Legs: 1
- No. of shows: 11

Ricky Martin concert chronology
- All In (2017–18); Movimiento Tour (2020); Enrique Iglesias and Ricky Martin Live in Concert (2021)

The Movimiento Tour was the eleventh concert tour by Puerto Rican recording artist Ricky Martin, in support of his eleventh studio album, which was set to be called Movimiento (2020). The tour began in San Juan, Puerto Rico at the José Miguel Agrelot Coliseum on February 7, 2020. Owing to the COVID-19 pandemic, more than half of the scheduled dates were canceled. Also because of the pandemic and subsequent personal experiences, Martin decided to split the tour's associated album in two extended plays, Pausa and Play; the former was released on May 29, 2020, and the latter is expected to be released in September 2020.

== Setlist ==
The following setlist was obtained from the February 7, 2020 concert, held at the José Miguel Agrelot Coliseum in San Juan, Puerto Rico. It does not represent all concerts during the duration of the tour.

1. "Cántalo"
2. "La Bomba"
3. "Isla Bella"
4. "Bombón de Azúcar"
5. "Tiburones"
6. "Livin' la Vida Loca"
7. "Loaded"
8. "Shake Your Bon-Bon"
9. "Fuego Contra Fuego"
10. "Fuego de Noche, Nieve de Día"
11. "Te Extraño, Te Olvido, Te Amo"
12. "Tu Recuerdo"
13. "Lola, Lola"
14. "She Bangs"
15. "Nobody Wants to Be Lonely"
16. "Vuelve"
17. "Pégate"
18. "La Mordidita"
19. "María"
20. "The Cup of Life"
21. "Vente Pa' Ca"

== Shows ==
List of concerts, showing date, city, country, venue, opening act, tickets sold, number of available tickets and amount of gross revenue
| Date | City | Country | Venue | Attendance | Revenue |
Latin America
| February 7, 2020 | San Juan | Puerto Rico | José Miguel Agrelot Coliseum | 31,927 / 34,085 | 2,725,143 |
| February 8, 2020 | San Juan | Puerto Rico | José Miguel Agrelot Coliseum | 31,927 / 34,085 | 2,725,143 |
| February 9, 2020 | San Juan | Puerto Rico | José Miguel Agrelot Coliseum | 31,927 / 34,085 | 2,725,143 |
| February 21, 2020 | Barranquilla | Colombia | Romelio Martínez Stadium | | |
| February 23, 2020 (Note: The February 23, 2020, concert in Viña del Mar, Chile is a part of Viña del Mar International Song Festival.) | Viña del Mar | Chile | Quinta Vergara Amphitheater | | |
| February 25, 2020 | Córdoba | Argentina | Orfeo Superdomo | | |
| February 27, 2020 | Buenos Aires | Argentina | Movistar Arena | | |
| February 28, 2020 | Buenos Aires | Argentina | Movistar Arena | | |
| February 29, 2020 | Buenos Aires | Argentina | Movistar Arena | | |
| March 2, 2020 | Montevideo | Uruguay | Antel Arena | | |
| March 7, 2020 | Ensenada | Mexico | Rancho Chichihuas | | |

== Cancelled shows ==
List of cancelled concerts, showing date, city, country, venue and reason for cancellation
| Date | City | Country | Venue | Reason |
|---|---|---|---|---|
| March 10, 2020 | Hermosillo | Mexico | Expo Fórum | Logistical Issues |
| March 13, 2020 | Monterrey | Mexico | Arena Monterrey | COVID-19 pandemic |
| March 14, 2020 | Torreón | Mexico | Explanada de la Feria | COVID-19 pandemic |
| March 16, 2020 | Zacatecas City | Mexico | Multiforo | COVID-19 pandemic |
| March 18, 2020 | Guadalajara | Mexico | Arena VFG | COVID-19 pandemic |
| March 20, 2020 | Querétaro City | Mexico | Hipico Juriquilla | COVID-19 pandemic |
| March 21, 2020 | Mexico City | Mexico | Foro Sol | COVID-19 pandemic |
| March 24, 2020 (Note: The March 24, 2020, concert in Toluca, Mexico is a part of Festiva Toluca de San José.) | Toluca | Mexico | Plaza de los Mártires | COVID-19 pandemic |
| March 25, 2020 | Aguascalientes | Mexico | Mega Velaria | COVID-19 pandemic |
| March 27, 2020 | Veracruz | Mexico | World Trade Center Veracruz | COVID-19 pandemic |
| March 28, 2020 | Puebla | Mexico | Auditorio GNP | COVID-19 pandemic |
| April 1, 2020 | San Luis Potosí | Mexico | Estadio de Beisbol Veinte de Noviembre | COVID-19 pandemic |
| April 2, 2020 | León | Mexico | Poliforum León | COVID-19 pandemic |
| April 4, 2020 | Acapulco | Mexico | Forum de Mundo Imperial | COVID-19 pandemic |
