= Casi un Bolero =

Single by Ricky Martin

from the album Vuelve
- Released: December 21, 1998
- Recorded: 1997
- Genre: Latin pop
- Length: 4:39
- Label: Columbia
- Songwriters: Draco Rosa; K. C. Porter; Luis Gómez-Escolar
- Producers: Porter; Rosa

Ricky Martin singles chronology
"Por Arriba, Por Abajo" (1998)	"Casi un Bolero" (1998)	"Livin' la Vida Loca" (1999)

Audio
- "Ricky Martin - Casi un Bolero (Audio)" on YouTube

"Casi un Bolero" (English: Almost a Bolero) is the seventh overall single from Ricky Martin's fourth Spanish-language album, Vuelve (1998). It was released as a promotional single in Spain on December 21, 1998.

== Background and release ==
"Casi un Bolero" was written by Draco Rosa, K. C. Porter and Luis Gómez-Escolar, and produced by Porter and Rosa. It was included on Martin's 1998 album, Vuelve. The US and Japanese editions of the album also feature an instrumental version of the song. "Casi un Bolero" was released as the fourth single from Vuelve in Spain and seventh overall. It was released as a promotional single only on December 21, 1998, after "The Cup of Life," "La Bomba" and "Perdido Sin Ti."

== Critical reception ==
Jose F. Promis from AllMusic mentioned "Casi un Bolero" as one of the highlights on Vuelve and called it a Sting-esque song.

== Chart performance ==
The song entered the Top 40 Radio chart in Spain on January 2, 1999 and reached number seven there. It became the third most successful song from Vuelve on the Spanish radio, after chart-topping "The Cup of Life" and "La Bomba." Other singles in Spain, "Perdido Sin Ti" and "Por Arriba, Por Abajo" reached numbers eighteen and seventeen, respectively.

== English-language version ==
Martin recorded also an English-language version of the song, titled "Almost a Love Song." The English lyrics were written by Desmond Child, who also co-produced this version. "Almost a Love Song" was included as B-side on Martin's future English-language singles: "Shake Your Bon-Bon" (1999), "Private Emotion" (2000) and "She Bangs" (2000). The Asian tour limited edition of Vuelve from late 1998 also includes a Spanglish version of "Casi un Bolero."

== Music video ==
The promotional music video was released with the Spanglish version of the song. It includes live footage of Martin performing "Casi un Bolero."

== Formats and track listings ==
Spanish promotional CD single

1. "Casi un Bolero" – 4:39

Taiwan promotional CD single

1. "Casi un Bolero" (Spanglish Version) - 4:40

== Charts ==
Chart (1999)	Peak position
Spain (Top 40 Radio)	7
