= One World Tour (Ricky Martin) =

2015–18 concert tour by Ricky Martin

- World tour by Ricky Martin
- Promotional poster for the tour
- Location: North America; South America; Europe; Oceania; Asia
- Associated album: A Quien Quiera Escuchar
- Start date: April 17, 2015
- End date: February 23, 2018
- Legs: 14
- No. of shows: 131

Ricky Martin concert chronology
- Live in Mexico (2014); One World Tour (2015–18); All In (2017–18)

The One World Tour was the tenth tour by Puerto Rican singer Ricky Martin, in support of his tenth studio album A Quien Quiera Escuchar (2015). The tour began in Auckland, New Zealand, at the Vector Arena on April 17, 2015 and was extended to conclude in the Dubai International Jazz Festival in February 2018. The One World Tour grossed $57.4 million with a total attendance of 802,931 from 105 shows reported in 2015 and 2016.

== Setlist ==
The following setlist was obtained from the October 25, 2016 concert, held at the Movistar Arena in Santiago, Chile. It does not represent all concerts during the duration of the tour.

1. "Mr. Put It Down"
2. "This is Good"
3. "Drop It on Me"
4. "Shake Your Bon-Bon"
5. "Adrenalina" (performed with Wisin)
6. "Tal Vez"
7. "Livin' la Vida Loca"
8. "It's Alright"
9. "She Bangs"
10. "Come with Me"
11. "Asignatura Pendiente"
12. "Disparo al Corazón"
13. "Tu Recuerdo"
14. "Vuelve"
15. "Adiós"
16. "Lola, Lola"
17. "María"
18. "Vente Pa' Ca"
19. "La Bomba"
20. "Por Arriba, Por Abajo"
21. "Pégate"
22. "The Cup of Life"
23. "La Mordidita"

== Shows ==
List of concerts, showing date, city, country, venue, opening act, tickets sold, number of available tickets and amount of gross revenue
Date	City	Country	Venue	Opening act	Attendance	Revenue
Oceania
April 17, 2015	Auckland	New Zealand	Vector Arena	—N/a	—N/a	—N/a
April 18, 2015	Wellington	New Zealand	TSB Bank Arena	—N/a	—N/a	—N/a
April 19, 2015	Hamilton	New Zealand	Claudelands Arena	—N/a	—N/a	—N/a
April 21, 2015	Christchurch	New Zealand	Horncastle Arena	—N/a	—N/a	—N/a
April 24, 2015	Townsville	Australia	TECC Auditorium	Delta Goodrem	—N/a	—N/a
April 25, 2015	Townsville	Australia	TECC Auditorium	Delta Goodrem	—N/a	—N/a
April 28, 2015	Brisbane	Australia	Brisbane Entertainment Centre	Delta Goodrem	4,937 / 5,342	$444,301
April 30, 2015	Sydney	Australia	Allphones Arena	Delta Goodrem	10,116 / 10,344	$1,071,300
May 2, 2015	Melbourne	Australia	Rod Laver Arena	Delta Goodrem	11,750 / 12,195	$1,075,450
May 5, 2015	Adelaide	Australia	Adelaide Entertainment Centre	Delta Goodrem	—N/a	—N/a
May 8, 2015	Perth	Australia	Perth Arena	Delta Goodrem	7,622 / 7,663	$679,707
North America
June 10, 2015	Monterrey	Mexico	Arena Monterrey	—N/a	—N/a	—N/a
June 11, 2015	Monterrey	Mexico	Arena Monterrey	—N/a	—N/a	—N/a
June 13, 2015	Tampico	Mexico	Expo Tampico	—N/a	—N/a	—N/a
June 17, 2015	Zapopan	Mexico	Auditorio Telmex	—N/a	—N/a	—N/a
June 18, 2015	Zapopan	Mexico	Auditorio Telmex	—N/a	—N/a	—N/a
June 19, 2015	Mexico City	Mexico	Auditorio Nacional	—N/a	19,040 /19,040	$1,567,765
June 20, 2015	Mexico City	Mexico	Auditorio Nacional	—N/a	19,040 /19,040	$1,567,765
September 15, 2015	Las Vegas	United States	The AXIS	—N/a	5,015 / 6,075	$512,349
September 16, 2015	Reno	United States	Grand Theatre	—N/a	—N/a	—N/a
September 17, 2015	Oakland	United States	Oracle Arena	Ha*Ash	—N/a	—N/a
September 19, 2015	Inglewood	United States	The Forum	Ha*Ash	—N/a	—N/a
September 20, 2015	San Diego	United States	Viejas Arena	Ha*Ash	—N/a	—N/a
September 23, 2015	Tucson	United States	Anselmo Valencia Tori Amphitheater	—N/a	—N/a	—N/a
September 24, 2015	Albuquerque	United States	Sandia Casino Amphitheater	—N/a	—N/a	—N/a
September 26, 2015	Phoenix	United States	Comerica Theatre	Ha*Ash	—N/a	—N/a
September 27, 2015	El Paso	United States	El Paso County Coliseum	Ha*Ash	—N/a	—N/a
September 29, 2015	Hidalgo	United States	State Farm Arena	Ha*Ash	—N/a	—N/a
September 30, 2015	Houston	United States	Toyota Center	Ha*Ash	4,718 / 5,168	$438,188
October 1, 2015	Laredo	United States	Laredo Energy Arena	Ha*Ash	—N/a	—N/a
October 3, 2015	San Antonio	United States	Freeman Coliseum	Ha*Ash	—N/a	—N/a
October 4, 2015	Dallas	United States	Gexa Energy Pavilion	Ha*Ash	—N/a	—N/a
October 8, 2015	New York City	United States	Madison Square Garden	Wisin	—N/a	—N/a
October 9, 2015	Fairfax	United States	EagleBank Arena	Wisin	4,606 / 5,652	$332,245
October 11, 2015	Rosemont	United States	Allstate Arena	Wisin	—N/a	—N/a
October 14, 2015	Montreal	Canada	Centre Bell	Wisin	3,790 / 4,796	$255,847
October 15, 2015	Toronto	Canada	Air Canada Centre	Wisin	7,333 / 7,333	$327,244
October 17, 2015	Atlantic City	United States	Boardwalk Hall	Wisin	4,988 / 6,370	$343,857
October 18, 2015	Uncasville	United States	Mohegan Sun Arena	Wisin	4,846 / 6,277	$303,074
October 21, 2015	Durham	United States	Durham Performing Arts Center	—N/a	—N/a	—N/a
October 22, 2015	Atlanta	United States	Philips Arena	Wisin	5,703 / 7,582	$269,856
October 24, 2015	Miami	United States	American Airlines Arena	Wisin	—N/a	—N/a
October 25, 2015	Orlando	United States	Amway Center	Wisin	5,768 / 5,768	$462,831
February 6, 2016	La Romana	Dominican Republic	Anfiteatro Altos de Chavón	DJ Korduroy	—N/a	—N/a
South America
February 9, 2016 (Note: The February 9, 2016 concert in Villa María at Anfiteatro Hermán Figueroa Reyes was part of the 2016 Festival Internacional de Peñas de Villa María.)	Villa María	Argentina	Anfiteatro Hermán Figueroa Reyes	—N/a	—N/a	—N/a
North America
February 12, 2016	San Juan	Puerto Rico	José Miguel Agrelot Coliseum	CNCO	39,732 / 39,732	$2,985,385
February 13, 2016	San Juan	Puerto Rico	José Miguel Agrelot Coliseum	CNCO	39,732 / 39,732	$2,985,385
February 14, 2016	San Juan	Puerto Rico	José Miguel Agrelot Coliseum	CNCO	39,732 / 39,732	$2,985,385
South America
February 20, 2016 (Note: The February 20, 2016 concert in El Calafate at Anfiteatro del Bosque was part of the 2016 Fiesta Nacional del Lago.)	El Calafate	Argentina	Anfiteatro del Bosque	—N/a	—N/a	—N/a
February 23, 2016	Neuquén	Argentina	Estadio Ruca Che	—N/a	—N/a	—N/a
February 25, 2016 (Note: The February 25, 2016 concert in San Juan, Argentina at Autódromo Eduardo Copello was part of the 2016 Fiesta Nacional del Sol.)	San Juan	Argentina	Autódromo Eduardo Copello	—N/a	—N/a	—N/a
February 26, 2016	Mendoza	Argentina	Arena Maipú	CNCO	—N/a	—N/a
February 27, 2016	Mendoza	Argentina	Arena Maipú	CNCO	—N/a	—N/a
February 29, 2016	Concepción	Chile	Estadio Municipal de Concepción	—N/a	—N/a	—N/a
March 2, 2016	Santiago	Chile	Movistar Arena	CNCO	—N/a	—N/a
March 3, 2016	Santiago	Chile	Movistar Arena	CNCO	—N/a	—N/a
March 5, 2016	Córdoba	Argentina	Orfeo Superdomo	—N/a	—N/a	—N/a
March 6, 2016	Rosario	Argentina	Salón Metropolitano	CNCO	—N/a	—N/a
March 7, 2016	Rosario	Argentina	Salón Metropolitano	CNCO	—N/a	—N/a
March 9, 2016	Junín	Argentina	Sociedad Rural Junín	—N/a	—N/a	—N/a
March 11, 2016	Buenos Aires	Argentina	Estadio José Amalfitani	CNCO	—N/a	—N/a
March 12, 2016	Buenos Aires	Argentina	Estadio José Amalfitani	CNCO	—N/a	—N/a
March 14, 2016	Montevideo	Uruguay	Velódromo Municipal de Montevideo	—N/a	—N/a	—N/a
March 15, 2016	Montevideo	Uruguay	Velódromo Municipal de Montevideo	—N/a	—N/a	—N/a
March 17, 2016	Resistencia	Argentina	Estadio Centenario	—N/a	—N/a	—N/a
March 19, 2016	San Miguel de Tucumán	Argentina	Estadio Central Córdoba de Tucumán	—N/a	—N/a	—N/a
March 20, 2016	Salta	Argentina	Estadio Padre Ernesto Martearena	—N/a	—N/a	—N/a
March 24, 2016	Buenos Aires	Argentina	DirecTV Arena	—N/a	—N/a	—N/a
March 25, 2016	Mar del Plata	Argentina	Estadio Polideportivo Islas Malvinas	—N/a	—N/a	—N/a
North America				—N/a	—N/a	—N/a
August 24, 2016	Vienna	United States	Filene Center	—N/a	—N/a	—N/a
August 25, 2016	Vienna	United States	Filene Center	—N/a	—N/a	—N/a
August 27, 2016	Hollywood	United States	Hard Rock Live	—N/a	—N/a	—N/a
Europe
September 8, 2016	Málaga	Spain	Auditorio Municipal Cortijo de Torres	—N/a	—N/a	—N/a
September 9, 2016	Las Palmas	Spain	Anexo Estadio de Gran Canaria	—N/a	—N/a	—N/a
September 10, 2016	Arona	Spain	Estadio Olímpico Municipal	—N/a	—N/a	—N/a
Asia
September 12, 2016 (Note: The September 12, 2016 concert in Muratpaşa at Kır Aktivite Alanı was part of the Antalya 2016 Expo.)	Muratpaşa	Turkey	Kır Aktivite Alanı	—N/a	—N/a	—N/a
September 14, 2016	Tel Aviv	Israel	Menora Mivtachim Arena	—N/a	—N/a	—N/a
Europe
September 16, 2016	Madrid	Spain	Palacio Vistalegre	—N/a	—N/a	—N/a
September 18, 2016 (Note: The September 18, 2016 concert in Mérida, Spain at Albergue Municipal Juvenil El Prado will be part of the 2016 Stone & Music Festival.)	Mérida	Spain	Albergue Municipal Juvenil El Prado	—N/a	—N/a	—N/a
September 20, 2016	Moscow	Russia	VTB Ice Palace	—N/a	—N/a	—N/a
September 22, 2016 (Note: The September 22 and 23, 2016 concerts in London at Eventim Apollo were part of the 2016 Autism Rocks.)	London	England	Eventim Apollo	—N/a	4,376 / 5,312	$213,740
September 23, 2016	London	England	Eventim Apollo	—N/a	4,376 / 5,312	$213,740
South America
October 25, 2016	Santiago	Chile	Movistar Arena	—N/a	—N/a	—N/a
October 27, 2016	Santiago	Chile	Movistar Arena	—N/a	—N/a	—N/a
October 29, 2016	Buenos Aires	Argentina	DirecTV Arena	—N/a	—N/a	—N/a
October 30, 2016	Lima	Peru	Explanada del Estadio Monumental	—N/a	—N/a	—N/a
November 1, 2016	Azul	Argentina	Hipódromo de Azul	—N/a	—N/a	—N/a
November 2, 2016	Rosario	Argentina	Salón Metropolitano	—N/a	—N/a	—N/a
November 3, 2016	Córdoba	Argentina	Orfeo Superdomo	—N/a	—N/a	—N/a
November 5, 2016	Santa Cruz de la Sierra	Bolivia	Estadio Ramón Tahuichi Aguilera	—N/a	—N/a	—N/a
November 6, 2016	La Paz	Bolivia	Estadio Hernando Siles	—N/a	—N/a	—N/a
North America
November 11, 2016	Mérida	Mexico	Coliseo Yucatán	—N/a	—N/a	—N/a
November 13, 2016	Cancún	Mexico	Estadio Olímpico Andrés Quintana Roo	—N/a	—N/a	—N/a
November 17, 2016	Panama City	Panama	Figali Convention Center	—N/a	—N/a	—N/a
November 19, 2016	Jojutla de Juárez	Mexico	Jardines de México	—N/a	—N/a	—N/a
November 20, 2016	Acapulco	Mexico	Forum de Mundo Imperial	—N/a	—N/a	—N/a
November 22, 2016	Monterrey	Mexico	Arena Monterrey	Lali	—N/a	—N/a
November 23, 2016	Zapopan	Mexico	Auditorio Telmex	Lali	—N/a	—N/a
November 25, 2016	Mexico City	Mexico	Auditorio Nacional	Lali	—N/a	—N/a
November 27, 2016	Puebla	Mexico	Acrópolis Puebla	—N/a	—N/a	—N/a
December 2, 2016 (Note: The December 2, 2016 concerts in Newark, New Jersey at Prudential Center will be part of the 2016 Mega Bash.)	Newark	United States	Prudential Center	—N/a	11,682 / 12,496	$940,014
December 7, 2016	Torreón	Mexico	Coliseo Centenario	—N/a	—N/a	—N/a
December 9, 2016	Hermosillo	Mexico	Expo Forum	—N/a	—N/a	—N/a
December 11, 2016	Tijuana	Mexico	Estadio Gasmart	—N/a	—N/a	—N/a
December 14, 2016	San Luis Potosí City	Mexico	El Domo	—N/a	—N/a	—N/a
December 15, 2016	Querétaro City	Mexico	Centro de Congresos Querétaro	—N/a	—N/a	—N/a
May 5, 2017	Oxon Hill	United States	The Theater at MGM National Harbor	—	—	—
May 6, 2017	Oxon Hill	United States	The Theater at MGM National Harbor	—	—	—
Europe
May 23, 2017	Madrid	Spain	Palacio de Deportes	—	—	—
May 24, 2017	Granada	Spain	Plaza de Toros	—	—	—
May 26, 2017	Valencia	Spain	Plaza de Toros	—	—	—
May 27, 2017	Sevilla	Spain	Estadio la Cartuja	—	—	—
May 28, 2017	Valencia	Spain	Plaza de Toros	—	—	—
May 30, 2017	Barcelona	Spain	Palau Sant Jordi	—	—	—
May 31, 2017	Palma de Mallorca	Spain	Palma Arena	—	—	—
June 2, 2017	Valladolid	Spain	Recinto Ferial	—	—	—
June 3, 2017	Gijón	Spain	La Laboral	—	—	—
June 4, 2017	Murcia	Spain	Plaza de Toros	—	—	—
June 7, 2017	Zaragoza	Spain	Pabellón Príncipe Felipe	—	—	
June 9, 2017	Lisbon	Portugal	MEO Arena	—	—	—
June 10, 2017	A Coruña	Spain	Coliseum da Coruña	—	—	—
June 11, 2017	Bilbao	Spain	Bizkaia Arena	—	—	—
North America
July 7, 2017	Mexico City	Mexico	Auditorio Nacional	—	19,240 / 19,240	$1,536,367
July 8, 2017	Mexico City	Mexico	Auditorio Nacional	—	19,240 / 19,240	$1,536,367
July 12, 2017	Tuxtla Gutiérrez	Mexico	Foro Chiapas	—	—	—
July 14, 2017	Victoria de Durango	Mexico	Recinto Ferial Durango	—	—	—
July 15, 2017	Cancún	Mexico	Estadio Olímpico Andrés Quintana Roo	—	—	—
November 5, 2017 (Note: The November 5th 2017 concert in Santo Domingo was part of the Festival Presidente.)	Santo Domingo	Dominican Republic	Estadio Olímpico Félix Sánchez	—	—	—
November 25, 2017	Mexico City	Mexico	Zócalo	—	—	—
Asia
February 23, 2018 (Note: The February 23rd, 2018 concert in Dubai was part of the Dubai International Jazz Festival.)	Dubai	United Arab Emirates	Dubai Festival City	—	—	—

== Notes ==
Pollstar Complied Ticket Data

Year	Report	Rank	Total Tickets	Total gross revenue
2014	Top 200 North American Tours	179	20,980	$4.8 million
2015	Top 100 Worldwide Tours	90	278,957	$19.7 million
2016	Top 100 Worldwide Tours	37	523.974	$37.7 million
