= All In (residency) =

Concert residency by Ricky Martin

- Residency by Ricky Martin
- Promotional poster for the residency
- Location: Paradise, Nevada; United States
- Venue: Park Theater at Monte Carlo Resort and Casino
- Start date: April 5, 2017
- End date: June 3, 2018
- Legs: 5
- No. of shows: 18 in 2017; 12 in 2018; 30 in total

Ricky Martin concert chronology
- One World Tour (2015–18); All In (2017–18); Movimiento Tour (2020)

All In was a concert residency by Puerto Rican singer Ricky Martin. Held at the Park Theater on the Las Vegas Strip in Paradise, Nevada, the residency spanned two years with 30 shows total.

== Set list ==
1. "Livin' la Vida Loca"
2. "This Is Good"
3. "Shake Your Bon-Bon"
4. "Luck Be a Lady / The Lady Is a Tramp"
5. "It's Alright"
6. "Private Emotion"
7. "She's All I Ever Had"
8. "Drop It on Me"
9. "Lola, Lola"
10. "Vente Pa' Ca"
11. "La Bomba"
12. "She Bangs"
13. "Loaded"
14. "Nobody Wants to Be Lonely"
15. "Vuelve"
16. "Pégate"
17. "La Mordidita"
18. "Por Arriba, Por Abajo"
19. "María"
20. "The Cup of Life"

== Shows ==
Date	Attendance	Revenue
Leg 1
April 5, 2017	19,630 / 21,688 (91%)	$1,734,939
April 7, 2017	19,630 / 21,688 (91%)	$1,734,939
April 8, 2017	19,630 / 21,688 (91%)	$1,734,939
April 11, 2017	19,630 / 21,688 (91%)	$1,734,939
April 14, 2017	19,630 / 21,688 (91%)	$1,734,939
April 15, 2017	19,630 / 21,688 (91%)	$1,734,939
Leg 2
June 23, 2017	22,992 / 25,610 (90%)	$2,120,356
June 24, 2017	22,992 / 25,610 (90%)	$2,120,356
June 27, 2017	22,992 / 25,610 (90%)	$2,120,356
June 29, 2017	22,992 / 25,610 (90%)	$2,120,356
July 1, 2017	22,992 / 25,610 (90%)	$2,120,356
July 2, 2017	22,992 / 25,610 (90%)	$2,120,356
Leg 3
September 12, 2017	24,869 / 27,550 (90%)	$2,446,412
September 15, 2017	24,869 / 27,550 (90%)	$2,446,412
September 16, 2017	24,869 / 27,550 (90%)	$2,446,412
September 19, 2017	24,869 / 27,550 (90%)	$2,446,412
September 22, 2017	24,869 / 27,550 (90%)	$2,446,412
September 23, 2017	24,869 / 27,550 (90%)	$2,446,412
Leg 4
March 15, 2018	—	—
March 17, 2018	—	—
March 18, 2018	—	—
March 21, 2018	—	—
March 24, 2018	—	—
March 25, 2018	—	—
Leg 5
May 23, 2018	—	—
May 26, 2018	—	—
May 27, 2018	—	—
May 30, 2018	—	—
June 2, 2018	—	—
June 3, 2018	—	—
Total	67,491 / 74,848 (90%)	6,301,707
