= Nobody Wants to Be Lonely =

2001 single by Ricky Martin and Christina Aguilera

- Artwork for the duet version

Single by Ricky Martin with Christina Aguilera

from the album Sound Loaded
- B-side: "Sólo Quiero Amarte"
- Released: January 16, 2001
- Recorded: December 2000 (duet version)
- Studio: Gentlemen's Club (Miami); Capitol (Hollywood); The Hit Factory (New York City)
- Genre: Pop
- Length: 5:05 (album version); 4:12 (duet version); 3:59 (radio edit)
- Label: Columbia
- Songwriters: Desmond Child; Victoria Shaw; Gary Burr (English version); Ricky Martin; Danny López (Spanish version)
- Producers: Desmond Child (album version); Walter Afanasieff (duet version)

Ricky Martin singles chronology
"She Bangs" (2000)	"Nobody Wants to Be Lonely" (2001)	"Loaded" (2001)

Christina Aguilera singles chronology
"Pero Me Acuerdo de Ti" (2000)	"Nobody Wants to Be Lonely" (2001)	"Lady Marmalade" (2001)

Alternative cover
- Cover artwork used for "Sólo Quiero Amarte" in the United States

Music videos
- "Nobody Wants to Be Lonely" on YouTube
- "Sólo Quiero Amarte" on YouTube

"Nobody Wants to Be Lonely" is a song by Puerto Rican singer Ricky Martin from his sixth studio album, Sound Loaded (2000). Martin re-recorded the song along with American singer Christina Aguilera in December 2000. The album version was written by Desmond Child, Victoria Shaw, and Gary Burr and produced by Child; the duet received additional production from Walter Afanasieff. The duet was released by Columbia Records on January 16, 2001, as the second single from the album. A mid-tempo pop song and power ballad with elements of flamenco and Latin music, it is about heartbreak and longing.

"Nobody Wants to Be Lonely" received widely positive reviews from music critics, who complimented the singers' vocals. The song was listed among the Greatest Love Songs by VH1. It was nominated for Best Pop Collaboration with Vocals at the 44th Annual Grammy Awards, losing the award to Aguilera's other contender, "Lady Marmalade". The song was commercially successful, peaking at number one in Hungary, New Zealand, and Romania while topping Poland's airplay chart and Croatia's foreign song chart. It also reached the top five in Italy, Germany, Spain, and the United Kingdom, among others. In Australia and Canada, it became a top-10 hit. The song has received several certifications, including silver in the UK.

A Spanish-language solo version of the song, entitled "Sólo Quiero Amarte" (transl. "I Only Want to Love You"), penned by Martin and percussionist Danny López, was recorded by the former and released in the United States. This version reached the summit of the Billboard Hot Latin Tracks, Latin Pop Airplay, and Tropical/Salsa Airplay charts in the United States. To promote the English version of the song, Martin and Aguilera performed it on several television programs and award shows, such as the 2001 World Music Awards. The accompanying music videos for the duet and Spanish versions were directed by American director Wayne Isham and filmed in Florida. Several contestants on various music talent shows have covered the song.

== Background and release ==
From 1999 to 2000, Ricky Martin embarked on his fifth tour, the Livin' la Vida Loca Tour, to promote his first English album, Ricky Martin. While on tour in 2000, Martin returned to the studio and began recording material for his sixth studio album, Sound Loaded. The album was released on November 14, 2000, by Columbia Records, and a solo version of "Nobody Wants to Be Lonely" was included as the fifth track on the album. A Spanish version of the song, titled "Sólo Quiero Amarte" (transl. "I Only Want to Love You") was featured as the 15th track on the Latin American edition of the album with the same release date.

Martin re-recorded the song along with Christina Aguilera in Las Vegas in December 2000 for the 11th Annual Billboard Music Awards. Aguilera wrote about the re-recording in an online message: "An incredible music and career opportunity has come up for me to record a duet with Ricky Martin." In an interview with the Grammy Awards in 2021, Martin talked about collaborating with Aguilera: "Every time I talk about Christina, it brings a smile [to my face] because I think it was a very powerful track. Her delivery, her performance like always was beautiful." The duet was released to radio stations in the United States, by Columbia Records on January 16, 2001, as the second single from Sound Loaded. The track was not released in a major commercially available single format in the United States, and consumers could purchase the song only with buying the album. Those who had already bought the album could download it from Martin's website for free or mail a sticker from their copy of the album, receiving a free CD with the new version of "Nobody Wants to Be Lonely".

A maxi single, including all three versions of the song (solo, duet, and Spanish), as well as a remix of Martin's previous song, "She Bangs", was released in Europe, on January 16, 2001. Additionally, CD singles of the suetwere launched in Australia and the United Kingdom, on February 26, 2001. The promo CD of the Spanish version was released in the US and includes a salsa version of "Sólo Quiero Amarte" recorded by Martin. The duet version of "Nobody Wants to Be Lonely" was later added to Martin's compilation albums The Best of Ricky Martin (2001), 17 (2008), Greatest Hits (2011), Playlist: The Very Best of Ricky Martin (2012), and Greatest Hits: Souvenir Edition (2013), and Aguilera's Keeps Gettin' Better: A Decade of Hits (2008), while "Sólo Quiero Amarte" was added to Martin's La Historia (2001).

== Music and lyrics ==
"Nobody Wants to Be Lonely"
A 25-second sample of the song's chorus, which blends both Martin and Aguilera's vocals and features a mid-tempo melody.

Musically, the re-recorded version of "Nobody Wants to Be Lonely" is a mid-tempo pop song and power ballad, featuring elements of flamenco and Latin music. The News Journal noted that the duet features a more "danced-up" melody than the original, which was simply a ballad. Both the solo and duet versions of "Nobody Wants to Be Lonely" were written by Desmond Child, Victoria Shaw, and Gary Burr, while the production for the solo version was handled by Desmond Child and the duet's production was handled by Walter Afanasieff. Martin and Danny Lopez co-wrote "Sólo Quiero Amarte".

According to the duet version's sheet music on Musicnotes.com, "Nobody Wants to Be Lonely" uses piano and guitar and is composed in the key of B♭ minor with a groove of 100 beats per minute. Martin and Aguilera's vocals span from the low note of D♭_{4} to the high note of D♭_{6}. The album version track runs for a total of five minutes and five seconds, while the duet runs for a total of 4 minutes and 12 seconds. According to Stephen Daw from Billboard, "Nobody Wants to Be Lonely" is a love song about "heartbreak" and "longing", as well as "love, lose, and hope" according to mitú's Cristal Mesa, with lyrics including, "Nobody wants to be lonely / Nobody wants to cry / My body's longing to hold you / So bad, it hurts inside / Time is precious and it's slipping away / And I've been waiting for you all of my life".

== Critical reception ==
"Nobody Wants to Be Lonely" has been met with widely positive reviews from music critics. Billboard staff reviewed the duet version, following its release in January 2001, writing that the song was "edgier and sexier" than Martin's previous works and calling his vocal performance with Aguilera "radiant". They described the track as "the combination of two of pop music's most sexually charged performers", mentioning the song's "sensuality" and its "feel-good vibe". British trade paper Music Week referred to the duet as a "pop swayer" and noted its "perfect" performance. AllMusic reviewer Jose F. Promis wrote that the duet version was more "bombastic" than the solo album version. The Los Angeles Times staff described the singers as "two of pop's hottest heartthrobs". Tango's Alice Kelly stated: "These two harmonize each other so beautifully that anyone would be convinced their love story was real." Writing for The Advocate, Gina Vivinetto praised "Nobody Wants to Be Lonely", saying the singers "blended their voices beautifully" on the track. Cristal Mesa from mitú described them as "two vocal powerhouses" and said they "definitely keep your attention as they sing" the song.

In 2017, Bustle critic Mathew Jedeikin gave the song a positive review, saying it is "basically a cult classic". He added that although the track "seemed underappreciated" in 2001, it "has lived on as one of the most iconic duets of the early 2000s". Kevin Apaza from Direct Lyrics labeled the song "an iconic hit", and Mark Blankenship from NewNowNext described it as "spectacular". In 2018, Stephen Daw from Billboard placed it among Aguilera's 10 best collaborations in her career, saying "no two musical artists scream 'early aughts' quite like" Martin and Aguilera, describing them as "two icons". Also from Billboard, Rebecca Schiller named the duet one of Aguilera's "most memorable collaborations". Writing for O, The Oprah Magazine, Amanda Mitchell ranked the track as Martin's third-best song on her 2019 list. In the same year, Gary James of Entertainment Focus ranked the song as Aguilera's second-biggest duet. Idolator's Mike Wass acknowledged it as her sixth-best collaboration in 2021.

=== Accolades ===
"Nobody Wants to Be Lonely" was ranked at number 65 on VH1's "100 Greatest Love Songs". Tango ranked it at numbers 35 and 89 on the lists of "100 Best 2000s Love Songs To Play On Repeat" and "100 Songs About Loneliness For When You're Feeling Alone", respectively. In The Advocate, the song was placed in the ninth position on their "10 Best Queer Duets" list in 2015. In 2017, E! Online named it the fourth-best duet with a Latin star. The following year, in Yardbarker, the duet placed at number six on the list of best musical collaborations featuring Latin artists. In 2021, BuzzFeed listed Martin and Aguilera as the eighth famous musicians who had the "best musical chemistry of all time". "Nobody Wants to Be Lonely" was nominated for Choice Music – Love Song at the 2001 Teen Choice Awards. The song was also nominated for Best Pop Collaboration with Vocals at the 44th Annual Grammy Awards but lost to "Lady Marmalade" by Aguilera, Lil' Kim, Mýa, and Pink. "Nobody Wants to Be Lonely" won the silver award for Top Duet at the 2002 RTHK International Pop Awards. It earned a nomination for Best Collaboration at the 2001 Music Television Awards.

== Commercial performance ==
"Nobody Wants to Be Lonely" became an international hit. On the week of January 27, 2001, it debuted on the US Billboard Hot 100 at number 66. The following week, the song rose to number 34, becoming that week's highest climber as well as the greatest airplay gainer with an audience jump of 13 million. Three issues later, the duet peaked at number 13 on the Hot 100, becoming Martin's fourth and Aguilera's fifth top-20 hit in the US. The song spent a total of 20 weeks on the Hot 100. It also reached the top 10 on three other Billboard rankings: the Adult Contemporary chart (number three), the Mainstream Top 40 (number eight), and the Top 40 Tracks chart (number 10). In addition, the song appeared on the Rhythmic and Adult Top 40 charts, peaking at numbers 20 and 27, respectively. The Spanish-language version of the song, "Sólo Quiero Amarte", debuted at number 18 on Billboard Hot Latin Tracks on the chart issue dated February 10, 2001. It subsequently reached number one on April 7, 2001, and stayed there for four weeks, giving Martin his sixth number-one hit on the chart. It also topped the Latin Pop Airplay and Tropical/Salsa Airplay listings. On the Canadian Singles Chart, "Nobody Wants to Be Lonely" charted for seven weeks, achieving a peak of number six on April 28, 2001.

In the United Kingdom, the song debuted and peaked at number four on March 4, 2001, staying on the UK Singles Chart for 12 weeks. In July 2020, the British Phonographic Industry (BPI) certified the song silver for sales and streams exceeding 200,000 units. The record failed to enter the top 10 in Ireland, where it reached number 12 for two weeks and stayed in the top 30 for five weeks. In mainland Europe, the track topped four national rankings: Hungary's Mahasz chart, the Romanian Top 100, Poland's National Airplay chart, and Croatia's Foreign Singles chart. The song also reached number two in Greece, Italy, Spain, and Switzerland; number three in the Netherlands and Sweden; number four in Finland; and number five in Germany, Norway, and Portugal. In Denmark, the song peaked at number six, and IFPI Danmark awarded the song a gold certification for shipping over 4,000 copies. The record has also been certified gold in the Netherlands (40,000 units shipped), Sweden (15,000 units shipped), and Switzerland (20,000 units shipped). Elsewhere in Europe, "Nobody Wants to Be Lonely" peaked at number 11 in the Flanders region of Belgium, number 13 in Austria, number 16 in Belgium's Wallonia region, and number 28 in France. On the Eurochart Hot 100 ranking, the song reached number two in March 2001.

On February 18, 2001, "Nobody Wants to Be Lonely" debuted at number 27 on New Zealand's RIANZ Singles Chart. The following week, the track rose to number 20, then to number 12 three weeks in. After jumping to number two, the song ascended to number one, giving both Martin and Aguilera their second number-one hit; it was Martin's last song to chart until "Come with Me" in 2013. The song stayed at number one for two non-consecutive weeks, temporarily losing the number-one position to LeAnn Rimes' "Can't Fight the Moonlight" on the week of March 25, 2001, and remained in the top 50 for 17 weeks. In neighboring Australia, the track first appeared at number eight on the ARIA Singles Chart, which would become its peak. As such, it gave both Aguilera and Martin their fourth top-10 hit in Australia. After its debut, the song descended the chart, leaving the top 50 in May 2001 after logging nine weeks on the chart. The same month, the Australian Recording Industry Association (ARIA) certified the song gold for shipments of over 35,000 copies.

== Music videos ==
A screenshot from the music video, depicting Martin and Aguilera hugging each other romantically.

The accompanying music video for "Nobody Wants to Be Lonely" was filmed at the Miami Biltmore Hotel in December 2000 and was directed by American director Wayne Isham, who had also directed the videos for Martin's previous singles "Vuelve", "The Cup of Life", "La Bomba", "Livin' la Vida Loca", "She Bangs", and "Shake Your Bon-Bon". The visual was aired on January 16, 2001, on MTV's Making the Video. The video begins with several doves flying out of a historical building while Aguilera is standing alone in the foyer of the building. In the next scene, Martin is shown, leaning on the wall of an outdoor maze. The two start singing the song, and Aguilera shows off on the stairs out of the building while Martin watches her.

In another scene, Martin is seen outside standing between columns of the mansion. He and Aguilera then pass each other on the stairs and show love between themselves by hugging and spinning around each other. Martin touches her arm, and they look into each other's eyes. He once again passes by the columns, and the video depicts flying doves in the last scene. A music video was also filmed for "Sólo Quiero Amarte", which aired in 2001 and shows only Martin in the same scenes of "Nobody Wants to Be Lonely" video, singing the Spanish song in different locations of the mansion by his own. Mallory Schlossberg from Bustle described "Nobody Wants to Be Lonely" video set as "pretty epic", saying: "The architecture steals the show." Cristal Mesa from mitú named the visual Martin's 16th-best music video on her 2018 list and E! Online staff ranked it as Aguilera's 16th-best music video in 2021. It won the award for Outstanding Music Video at the 2002 ALMA Awards, and was also nominated for Ritmo Latino Award as the Best Music Video of the Year.

== Live performances and appearances in media ==
Martin gave his first live performance of "Nobody Wants to Be Lonely" at the 28th Annual American Music Awards on January 8, 2001. He and Aguilera delivered a performance of their collaboration on the BBC's Top of the Pops on January 19, 2001. The two performed the song together on The Tonight Show with Jay Leno on February 13, 2001, and on the ITV's CD:UK on May 4, 2001. They also performed it at the 13th Annual World Music Awards on May 28, 2001. In 2016, Francesca Bacardi from E! Online ranked this rendition as Aguilera's fifth-best live duet, saying "they kept dancing to a minimum and let their vocals do the talking". Martin and his team performed the song on the fourth season of The Voice Australia on August 9, 2015. "Nobody Wants to Be Lonely" was included on the set lists for Martin's the Ricky Martin Live tour, the All In residency, the Movimiento Tour, and the Enrique Iglesias and Ricky Martin Live in Concert tour. For the All In, Martin asked Aguilera to shoot a video of herself singing the song, and her visual appeared on the screen behind Martin during his performances for the residency. Martin uses the visual for his follow-up concerts and tours as well: "And because of that video, I think it's one of those songs that I will keep alive as much as I can."

"Nobody Wants to Be Lonely" has been covered by several contestants on various music talent shows. Members of 2B, Bernice Chitiul and Laurentiu Barzoi performed the song on the second season of Romanian television series X Factor in 2012. They did not gather enough votes for their rendition and were eliminated. Ádám Szabó and Lili Batánovics delivered a performance of the track on series four of X-Faktor in 2013. In the same year, Alina Dorobanțu and Mihai Băjinaru competed in a battle of covering the song on the third season of Vocea României, which Dorobanțu won. Eli Zamora and Madeline Consoer competed in a battle of singing a bilingual Spanglish version of "Nobody Wants to Be Lonely / Sólo Quiero Amarte" on 19th season of the American singing competition The Voice in 2020, which Consoer won. Coach Kelly Clarkson loved that Consoer "can handle any genre thrown" at her and couldn't "say no to such a versatile performer", while Gwen Stefani called Zamora "effortless".

== Track listings ==
- Australian CD single
1. "Nobody Wants to Be Lonely" (with Christina Aguilera) – 4:11
2. "Sólo Quiero Amarte" (radio edit) – 3:59
3. "Sólo Quiero Amarte" (Robbie Rivera's Smooth Mix) – 7:37
4. "She Bangs" (Obadam's Spanglish radio edit) – 3:59
- European 12-inch vinyl

A1. "Nobody Wants to Be Lonely" (with Christina Aguilera) – 4:11
A2. "Sólo Quiero Amarte" (Robbie Rivera's Diskofied Mix) – 8:10
B1. "Sólo Quiero Amarte" (Robbie Rivera's Smooth Mix) – 7:37
B2. "Sólo Quiero Amarte" (radio edit) – 3:59

- European maxi-CD single 1
1. "Nobody Wants to Be Lonely" (with Christina Aguilera) – 4:11
2. "Sólo Quiero Amarte" (radio edit) – 3:59
3. "Sólo Quiero Amarte" (Robbie Rivera's Smooth Mix) – 7:37
4. "Sólo Quiero Amarte" (video—radio edit) – 4:07
- European maxi-CD single 2
1. "Nobody Wants to Be Lonely" (with Christina Aguilera) – 4:11
2. "Sólo Quiero Amarte" (radio edit) – 3:59
3. "Nobody Wants to Be Lonely" – 5:04
4. "She Bangs" (Obadam's Spanglish Afro-Bang Mix) – 7:28
- Japanese CD single
1. "Loaded"
2. "Nobody Wants to Be Lonely" (with Christina Aguilera)
3. "Sólo Quiero Amarte" (radio edit)
- UK CD single
1. "Nobody Wants to Be Lonely" (with Christina Aguilera) – 4:11
2. "Sólo Quiero Amarte" (radio edit) – 3:59
3. "Private Emotion" (with Meja) – 4:01
- UK cassette single and European CD single
1. "Nobody Wants to Be Lonely" (with Christina Aguilera) – 4:11
2. "Sólo Quiero Amarte" (radio edit) – 3:59
- US CD single ("Sólo Quiero Amarte")
1. "Sólo Quiero Amarte" (radio edit) – 3:59
2. "Sólo Quiero Amarte" (salsa version) – 4:03

== Credits and personnel ==
Credits for "Nobody Wants to Be Lonely" are lifted from the second European maxi-CD single liner notes and the Sound Loaded booklet. Credits for "Sólo Quiero Amarte" are lifted from the US CD single liner notes.

=== Solo versions ===
Studios

- Recorded at The Gentlemen's Club (Miami, Florida, US), Capitol Studios (Hollywood, California, US), and The Hit Factory (New York City)
- Mixed at The Gentlemen's Club (Miami, Florida, US)
- "Sólo Quiero Amarte" mixed at Barking Doctor Studios (Mount Kisco, New York, US)
- Mastered at Sterling Sound (New York City)

==== Personnel ====
Album version

- Desmond Child – writing, production
- Victoria Shaw – writing
- Gary Burr – writing
- Ricky Martin – lead vocals
- Rob Eaton – mixing
- Craig Lozowick – assistant engineering
- Nathan Malki – assistant engineering
- Oswald "Wiz" Bowe – assistant engineering
- Matthew Gruber – assistant engineering
- German Ortiz – assistant engineering
- Conrad Golding – assistant engineering
- Juan Turek – assistant engineering
- Jimmy Hoyson – assistant engineering
- John Hendrickson – assistant engineering
- Chris Caroll – assistant engineering
- Jorge Gonzales – assistant engineering
- Ted Jensen – mastering

"Sólo Quiero Amarte" radio edit

- Ricky Martin – writing
- Danny López – writing
- Rob Eaton – recording
- Jules Gondar – recording
- Mick Guzauski – mixing
- Tom Bender – assistant mix engineering
- Jolie Levine-Aller – production coordination
- Brian Coleman – production coordination

"Sólo Quiero Amarte" salsa version

- Chris Willis – background vocals
- Gyan – background vocals
- Manny López – guitar
- Eric Bazilian – guitar
- Hugh McDonald – bass
- Michelle Diaz – piano
- Danny López – percussion
- Rafael Solano – percussion
- Kenny Aronoff – drums

=== Duet version ===
Studio

- Mixed at The Hit Factory (New York City)

Personnel

- Desmond Child – writing
- Victoria Shaw – writing
- Gary Burr – writing
- Ricky Martin – vocals
- Christina Aguilera – vocals
- Huey Dunbar – backing vocals
- Walter Afanasieff – production, arrangement
- Chris Apostle – production coordination
- Rich Davis – production coordination
- Tony Maserati – mixing
- Flip Osman – assistant mix engineering

== Charts ==
=== Weekly charts ===
Weekly chart performance for "Nobody Wants to Be Lonely"
Chart (2001)	Peak position
Australia (ARIA)	8
Austria (Ö3 Austria Top 40)	13
Belgium (Ultratop 50 Flanders)	11
Belgium (Ultratop 50 Wallonia)	16
Canada (Nielsen SoundScan)	6
Canada CHR (Nielsen BDS)	8
Croatia International (HRT)	1
Denmark (Tracklisten)	6
Europe (Eurochart Hot 100)	2
Finland (Suomen virallinen lista)	4
Finland Airplay (Suomen virallinen lista)	1
France (SNEP)	28
Germany (GfK)	5
Greece (IFPI Greece)	2
Hungary (Mahasz)	1
Ireland (IRMA)	12
Italy (FIMI)	2
Netherlands (Dutch Top 40)	3
Netherlands (Single Top 100)	4
New Zealand (Recorded Music NZ)	1
Norway (VG-lista)	5
Poland Airplay (Music & Media)	1
Poland (Nielsen Music Control)	1
Portugal (AFP)	5
Romania (Romanian Top 100)	1
Scottish Singles Sales (Official Charts)	8
Spain (Promusicae)	2
Sweden (Sverigetopplistan)	3
Switzerland (Schweizer Hitparade)	2
UK Singles (Official Charts)	4
US Billboard Hot 100	13
US Adult Contemporary (Billboard)	3
US Adult Pop Airplay (Billboard)	27
US Pop Airplay (Billboard)	8
US Rhythmic Airplay (Billboard)	20
US Top 40 Tracks (Billboard)	10

Weekly chart performance for "Sólo Quiero Amarte"
Chart (2001)	Peak position
US Hot Latin Songs (Billboard)	1
US Latin Pop Airplay (Billboard)	1
US Tropical Airplay (Billboard)	1

=== Year-end charts ===
2001 year-end chart performance for "Nobody Wants to Be Lonely"
Chart (2001)	Position
Austria (Ö3 Austria Top 40)	63
Belgium (Ultratop 50 Flanders)	90
Canada (Nielsen SoundScan)	55
Canada Radio (Nielsen BDS)	23
Europe (Eurochart Hot 100)	35
Germany (Media Control)	58
Netherlands (Dutch Top 40)	51
Netherlands (Single Top 100)	46
New Zealand (RIANZ)	28
Romania (Romanian Top 100)	15
Sweden (Hitlistan)	62
Switzerland (Schweizer Hitparade)	19
UK Singles (OCC)	80
US Billboard Hot 100	55
US Adult Contemporary (Billboard)	16
US Adult Top 40 (Billboard)	87
US Mainstream Top 40 (Billboard)	64
US Rhythmic Top 40 (Billboard)	94

2001 year-end chart performance for "Sólo Quiero Amarte"
Chart (2001)	Position
US Hot Latin Tracks (Billboard)	11
US Latin Pop Airplay (Billboard)	11
US Tropical/Salsa Airplay (Billboard)	9

== Certifications and sales ==
Certifications and sales for "Nobody Wants to Be Lonely"
Region	Certification	Certified units/sales
Australia (ARIA)	Gold	35,000^{^}
Denmark (IFPI Danmark)	Gold	4,000^{^}
Greece (IFPI Greece)	Gold	10,000^{^}
Netherlands (NVPI)	Gold	40,000^{^}
Sweden (GLF)	Gold	15,000^{^}
Switzerland (IFPI Switzerland)	Gold	20,000^{^}
United Kingdom (BPI)	Silver	200,000^{‡}
^{^} Shipments figures based on certification alone.^{‡} Sales+streaming figures based on certification alone.

== Release history ==
Release dates and formats for "Nobody Wants to Be Lonely"
Region	Date	Format(s)	Label(s)	Ref.
United States	January 16, 2001	Contemporary hit radio; rhythmic contemporary radio	Columbia	
Europe	January 16, 2001	Maxi-CD	Columbia	
Japan	February 15, 2001	CD	Epic	
Australia	February 26, 2001	CD	Columbia	
United Kingdom	February 26, 2001	CD; cassette	Columbia	
Taiwan	March 1, 2001	CD	Columbia	

== See also ==
- List of number-one Billboard Hot Latin Pop Airplay of 2001
- List of number-one Billboard Hot Latin Tracks of 2001
- List of number-one Billboard Latin Tropical Airplay of 2001
- List of number-one singles from the 2000s (New Zealand)
- List of Romanian Top 100 number ones of the 2000s
- List of UK top-ten singles in 2001
