= La Mordidita =

2015 single by Ricky Martin featuring Yotuel

Single by Ricky Martin featuring Yotuel Romero

from the album A Quien Quiera Escuchar
- Released: April 21, 2015
- Recorded: 2014
- Genre: Latin pop; merengue; salsa; bachata; cumbia; reggaeton
- Length: 3:31
- Label: Sony Music Latin
- Songwriters: Ricky Martin; Pedro Capó; Don Omar; José Gómez; Yotuel Romero; Beatriz Luengo
- Producers: Antonio Rayo; Yotuel Romero

Ricky Martin singles chronology
"Mr. Put It Down" (2015)	"La Mordidita" (2015)	"Que Se Sienta El Deseo" (2015)

Music video
- "La Mordidita" on YouTube

"La Mordidita" (transl. The Little Bite) is a song recorded by Puerto Rican singer Ricky Martin, featuring Cuban singer Yotuel Romero, from his tenth studio album, A Quien Quiera Escuchar (2015). It was released on April 21, 2015, through Sony Music Latin as the third single from the album. The song was written by Martin and Yotuel alongside Pedro Capó, Don Omar, José Gómez and Beatriz Luengo while the production was handled by Rayito and Yotuel. It is an uptempo song with prominent elements of Latin pop and lyrics detailing feelings of lust for a desired person.

The song received widely positive reviews from music critics who praised its blend of many musical elements such as merengue, salsa, bachata, cumbia, and reggaeton. It further received numerous nominations at several Latin award ceremonies. "La Mordidita" was commercially successful across Spain and Latin America. It reached number six on the US Billboard Hot Latin Songs and number three in Spain where it was certified double platinum. It was also certified 15× Latin platinum in the United States.

The music video for "La Mordidita", filmed in Cartagena, Colombia and directed by Simón Brand, premiered on June 12, 2015. It features Martin dancing on the streets accompanied by dancers, models, and ballerinas all infected with a "dancing virus" transmitted through a bite. It received a positive response from the public, winning the Video of the Year award at the Premio Lo Nuestro 2016 and becoming the singer's most-viewed video on Vevo. As part of the promotion of "La Mordidita", Martin made several appearances on televised shows and award ceremonies where he performed the song live. It was also performed live during his One World Tour (2015–17).

== Background and composition ==
"La Mordidita" was written by Ricky Martin, Pedro Capó, José Gómez, Yotuel Romero and Beatriz Luengo for Martin's tenth studio album A Quien Quiera Escuchar. Its production was completed by Antonio Rayo along with Romero. Talking about his collaboration with Yotuel, Ricky Martin said in an interview, "It was a very big collaboration being able to work with Yotuel; a Cuban brother, big producer, composer, someone who I admire and respect a lot". During the same interview, he talked about the song, saying "It is a coquettish song, it presents a party, union of cultures, it is energetic". Two remixes of the song were available for digital download; a Brian Cross remix on June 2, 2015, and an "Urban Remix" by Zion & Lennox on July 17, 2015.

The uptempo song is primarily a Latin pop track that also contains prominent musical elements of merengue, salsa, bachata, cumbia, and reggaeton. Allan Raible from Yahoo! further found "flamenco-esque propulsion and modern electro and EDM touches". Marcus Floyd of the website Renowned for Sound felt that the song was reminiscent of the "Latino party vibe" characteristic of Martin's other songs. Other critics further found influences of African and Latin music in its instrumentation and rhythms. "La Mordidita" contains a soccer chant during its bridge. Cuban rapper and singer Yotuel has a short rap contribution in the song. Lyrically, "La Mordidita" which translates to "The Little Bite" in English, talks about the lust felt for a desired person.

== Critical reception ==
Upon release, "La Mordidita" was met with universal acclaim from music critics. Jessica Lucia Roiz of Latin Times praised the track for being "sexy", "fun", and "addicting". Marcus Floyd of the website Renowned for Sound described it as "intense" and felt that musically, it exemplified the "Latino party vibe we love Ricky Martin for". AllMusic's writer Thom Jurek picked the song as one of the best on A Quien Quiera Escuchar. Clint Rhode of The Herald-Standard opined that "La Mordidita" is one of the songs on the album on which the singer is "delivering intoxicating rhythms". Yahoo!'s Allan Raible praised the "interesting mix" of musical elements on "La Mordidita". El Nuevo Día journalist Eliezer Ríos Camacho called the song "pure craftmanship" and wrote that it was created for dancing with a blend of merengue and La Quebrada-style techno.

A writer of Televisa dubbed the track a dance number in which all of Martin's Latin style is present. He further described it as a fusion of merengue and bachata and added that "it is going to be present on all of the dance floors". Carolina Cabrera from Starmedia praised the song for being "full with energy, sensuality and temptation". Writing for O, The Oprah Magazine, Amanda Mitchell ranked "La Mordidita" as Martin's sixth best song on her 2019 list. In 2020, MTV Argentina ranked it as one of Martin's best songs. Raisa Bruner from Time labeled the track "[an] under-appreciated Latin jam". An author of Cultura Colectiva described it as a "super sexy song" and "a very successful reggaeton hit". Noelia Bertol from Cadena Dial ranked it as one of "Ricky Martin six collaborations that have us moving the skeleton". In another article, she listed the track among his ten "songs that brighten up summers", describing it as "catchy". In his review for Vogue, Esteban Villaseñor ranked the song among Martin's most popular songs, stating it "is the perfect song with which Ricky Martin teaches us to move our hips".

== Accolades ==
In 2019, Cadena Dial placed "La Mordidita" on an unranked "ideal song list to do zumba". In 2020, Time ranked it as one of the 22nd "Best Workout Songs to Get You Motivated". Metro Puerto Rico placed it on an unranked list of the most listened songs of the 2010s, and Amazon Music ranked it as the 52nd Best Latin song of the decade. "La Mordidita" received nominations on several Latin-based award ceremonies. At the first Latin American Music Awards held in 2015, the song received an award in the category for favorite pop/rock song. At the 2016 Latin Billboard Music Awards, "La Mordidita" was nominated in the category Latin Pop Song of the Year, but lost to "Mi Verdad" by Maná and Shakira. It also received a nomination in the Best Latin Dance Track category at the 31st Annual International Dance Music Awards. "La Mordidita" was acknowledged as an award-winning song in the pop category at the 2016 ASCAP Latin Awards, and at the 2017 BMI Latin Awards.

Awards and nominations for "La Mordidita"
Year	Ceremony	Award	Result
2015	Latin Music Italian Awards	Best Latin Song of The Year	Nominated
2015	Latin Music Italian Awards	Best Latin Male Video of The Year	Nominated
2015	Latin Music Italian Awards	Best Latin Tropical Song of The Year	Nominated
2015	Latin American Music Awards	Favorite Pop/Rock Song	Won
2015	Premios Quiero	Best Male Artist Video	Nominated
2015	Premios Quiero	Video of the Year	Nominated
2015	Premios Quiero	Best Choreography	Nominated
2016	Premio Lo Nuestro	Video of the Year	Won
2016	International Dance Music Awards	Best Latin Dance Track	Nominated
2016	Billboard Latin Music Awards	Latin Pop Song of the Year	Nominated
2016	ASCAP Latin Awards	Pop Winning Song	Won
2017	BMI Latin Awards	Latin Publisher of the Year	Won
2017	BMI Latin Awards	Award Winning Songs	Won

== Commercial performance ==
Following the release of A Quien Quiera Escuchar in February 2015, "La Mordidita" debuted at number seventeen on the Billboard's US Latin Digital Songs chart, with 2,000 digital downloads sold. In May 2015, Martin extended his record for the most top twenty singles on Latin Pop Airplay, when "La Mordidita" jumped 40–20 on this chart. In mid-August 2015, "La Mordidita" earned Martin his twenty-sixth top ten hit on Hot Latin Songs. He became the fourth artist with the most top tens in the 29-year history of the chart. In late August 2015, Martin earned with "La Mordidita" his fifteenth number-one on the Latin Airplay chart (up 58 percent, to 11.8 million audience impressions). Eventually, "La Mordidita" peaked at number six on the US Hot Latin Songs chart, number one on Latin Airplay and number seven on Latin Digital Songs. It also reached number one on Latin Pop Airplay, number two on Latin Pop Digital Songs, and number twenty-six on Tropical Songs. On the 2015 Billboard Year-End charts, "La Mordidita" was ranked on the twentieth position on the Latin Airplay, twenty third on Hot Latin Songs, and thirty second on Latin Digital Songs. The song was certified 15× Latin platinum by the Recording Industry Association of America (RIAA), for track-equivalent sales of over 900,000 units in the United States, making it one of the best-selling Latin singles in the country.

"La Mordidita" peaked at number thirteen on the Mexican Espanol Airplay chart and number forty-eight on Mexico Airplay. It was certified quadruple platinum by the Asociación Mexicana de Productores de Fonogramas y Videogramas (AMPROFON) for shipment of 240,000 copies in that country. In Spain, the song debuted at number forty-three on the country's singles chart for the week of April 26, 2015. On the chart issue dated August 9, 2015, it reached a peak position of number three, and was later certified double-platinum by the Productores de Música de España (PROMUSICAE) for shipment of 80,000 copies. It later emerged as the 25th most successful single in Spain in 2015. "La Mordidita" also topped the charts in the Dominican Republic and Venezuela.

== Music video ==
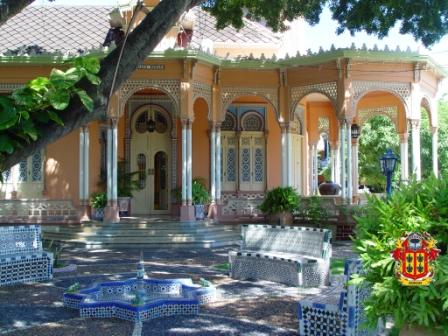
The Casa Museo Rafael Núñez, where the opening scenes of the music video were filmed.

The music video for "La Mordidita" was filmed in Cartagena, Colombia in mid-March 2015 with Simón Brand serving as its director. The first scenes of the clip were filmed at the Casa Museo Rafael Núñez, where Martin was accompanied by Colombian actress and ballet dancer María Cecilia Sánchez. Other scenes were filmed on various local streets in the city. Speaking about the concept behind the video, Brand elaborated that it revolved around Martin spreading a "virus" through a bite, converting the people around him into "sensual and amusing" dancing zombies. He concluded that "basically, we will be spreading the nibble across the city".

A short teaser for the clip was shown through the YouTube channel of Mexican magazine Quién on June 9, 2015. The music video later premiered on the Spanish-language television program Primer Impacto broadcast by Univision on June 12, 2015, and was released on Martin's Vevo account shortly afterwards. A behind-the-scenes video was also released on Vevo on June 15, 2015. The music video opens with Martin biting the hand of a girl who continues to dance afterwards. She dances inside a house and then goes in the garden, where she bites a gardener's neck. She continues dancing on the streets and bites a street vendor. The "infected" people go on biting people around them and they all gather behind Martin where the perform dance routines on the streets. During the end they all gather to continue their dance at a party. Yotuel also appears in the video towards the end.

Jessica Lucia Roiz of Latin Times praised the video's "wonderful" scenery. A writer of Televisa's website described Martin as "more sensual than ever". Mandy Fridmann of The Huffington Post wrote that the singer "gives us all of his sensuality in looks, movements and gestures". La Nación journalist Jessica Rojas found "fun and colorful image sequence of images". Marie Palma F. of Starmedia felt that the video showed "the taste of Latinos". The clip for "La Mordidita" became Martin's most-watched music video on Vevo as of 2015. Cristal Mesa from mitú ranked "La Mordidita" as Martin's 19th best music video on her 2018 list, and an author of Cultura Colectiva listed it among the "13 Videos to Appreciate Ricky Martin's Talent and Sickening Good Looks". At the seventh Premios Quiero in 2015, the music video for the song was nominated in three categories – Best Video by a Male Artist, Video of the Year and Best Choreography. It won the Video of the Year award at the Premio Lo Nuestro 2016 making Martin the most awarded artist in the history of the award show. As of July 2021, the video has received over 1.2 billion views on YouTube.

== Live performances ==
On June 30, 2015, Ricky Martin appeared on the Argentinian TV program Showmatch where he performed the song along with "Disparo al Corazón" and "Adiós". He also performed "La Mordidita" with Yotuel at the 2015 Premios Juventud on July 16, 2015, as the opening number of the awards ceremony. Yakary Prado of Miami Diario described Martin's choreography as "shocking". He also performed it as a medley with "Disparo al Corazón" during the Latin Grammy Awards of 2015 on November 19. On May 12, 2016, the song was performed by Yotuel along with Pedro Capó and Beatriz Luengo at the ASCAP Latin Music Awards. "La Mordidita" was part of Martin's set list during his One World Tour (2015–17). It was sung as a medley along with Martin's older songs "Pégate" (2006), "María" (1995) and "La Bomba" (1998). "La Mordidita" was also included on the set lists for Martin's the All In residency, the Ricky Martin en Concierto, the Movimiento Tour, and the Enrique Iglesias and Ricky Martin Live in Concert tour. He performed the track along with his other hits during the 61st Viña del Mar International Song Festival on February 23, 2020.

== Track listing ==
Digital download
No.	Title	Length
1.	"La Mordidita" (featuring Yotuel)	3:31

Digital single
No.	Title	Length
1.	"La Mordidita" (Brian Cross Remix featuring Yotuel)	3:34

Digital single
No.	Title	Length
1.	"La Mordidita" (Urban Remix featuring Zion & Lennox)	3:51

== Charts ==
=== Weekly charts ===
Weekly peak performance for "La Mordidita"
Chart (2015–2019)	Peak position
Chile Pop Airplay (Monitor Latino)	6
CIS Airplay (TopHit)	177
Dominican Republic Airplay (Monitor Latino)	1
Ecuador Airplay (National-Report)	14
France (SNEP)	159
Italy (FIMI)	68
Mexico Airplay (Billboard)	48
Nicaragua Pop Airplay (Monitor Latino)	15
Russia Airplay (TopHit)	178
Spain (Promusicae)	3
US Hot Latin Songs (Billboard)	6
US Latin Airplay (Billboard)	1
US Latin Pop Airplay (Billboard)	1
US Tropical Airplay (Billboard)	26
Venezuela Airplay (National-Report)	1

=== Year-end charts ===
2015 year-end chart performance for "La Mordidita"
Chart (2015)	Position
Dominican Republic Pop (Monitor Latino)	6
Ecuador (SOPROFON)	6
Spain (PROMUSICAE)	25
US Hot Latin Songs (Billboard)	23
US Latin Airplay (Billboard)	20
US Latin Pop Songs (Billboard)	9

2016 year-end chart performance for "La Mordidita"
Chart (2016)	Position
Argentina (Monitor Latino)	46
Chile (Monitor Latino)	14
Ecuador (Monitor Latino)	100
Panama Pop (Monitor Latino)	18
Spain (PROMUSICAE)	92
Venezuela Pop (Monitor Latino)	21

2017 year-end chart performance for "La Mordidita"
Chart (2017)	Position
Argentina Latino (Monitor Latino)	80
Bolivia (Monitor Latino)	64
Chile (Monitor Latino)	55
Dominican Republic Pop (Monitor Latino)	39
Panama Pop (Monitor Latino)	32
Uruguay (Monitor Latino)	79
Venezuela Pop (Monitor Latino)	55

2018 year-end chart performance for "La Mordidita"
Chart (2018)	Position
Chile Pop (Monitor Latino)	45
Honduras Pop (Monitor Latino)	59
Puerto Rico Pop (Monitor Latino)	69

2019 year-end chart performance for "La Mordidita"
Chart (2019)	Position
Honduras Pop (Monitor Latino)	67
Puerto Rico Pop (Monitor Latino)	87

2020 year-end chart performance for "La Mordidita"
Chart (2020)	Position
Honduras Pop (Monitor Latino)	77

2021 year-end chart performance for "La Mordidita"
Chart (2021)	Position
Chile Pop (Monitor Latino)	86

2022 year-end chart performance for "La Mordidita"
Chart (2022)	Position
Honduras Pop (Monitor Latino)	92

2023 year-end chart performance for "La Mordidita"
Chart (2023)	Position
Honduras Pop (Monitor Latino)	78
Venezuela Pop (Monitor Latino)	97

== Certifications ==
Region	Certification	Certified units/sales
Brazil (Pro-Música Brasil)	Gold	30,000^{‡}
Italy (FIMI)	Platinum	50,000^{‡}
Mexico (AMPROFON)	Diamond+2× Platinum+Gold	450,000^{‡}
Poland (ZPAV)	Gold	25,000^{‡}
Spain (Promusicae)	4× Platinum	160,000^{‡}
United States (RIAA)	15× Platinum (Latin)	900,000^{‡}
^{‡} Sales+streaming figures based on certification alone.

== Release history ==
Country	Date	Format	Label	Ref.
United States	June 2, 2015	Digital download (Brian Cross Remix)	Sony Music Latin	
United States	July 16, 2015	Digital download (Urban Remix)	Sony Music Latin	

== See also ==
- List of Billboard Hot Latin Songs and Latin Airplay number ones of 2015
