= Enrique Iglesias and Ricky Martin Live in Concert =

2021 concert tour

- Continental tour by Enrique Iglesias and Ricky Martin
- Promotional poster for the tour
- Location: North America
- Start date: September 25, 2021
- End date: November 20, 2021
- Legs: 1
- No. of shows: 26
Enrique Iglesias tour chronology
All the Hits Live (2018–19)	Enrique Iglesias & Ricky Martin Live in Concert (2021)	The Trilogy Tour (2023–24)
Ricky Martin tour chronology
Movimiento Tour (2020)	Enrique Iglesias & Ricky Martin Live in Concert (2021)	Sinfónico Tour (2022–23)

Enrique Iglesias and Ricky Martin Live in Concert was a co-headlining concert tour by Spanish singer Enrique Iglesias and Puerto Rican performer Ricky Martin. The tour began in Las Vegas, Nevada on September 25, 2021, ending in Anaheim, California on November 20, 2021. The tour grossed $19,265,066 with an attendance of 177,642 from 15 shows reported in 2021. In-total, the tour profited $35.2 million in ticket sales, with 312k tickets sold.

== Background ==
The two Latin music superstars announced on March 4, 2020 that they're embarking on a joint tour. Enrique Iglesias and Ricky Martin shared the news with a group of reporters at a press conference in Los Angeles. The two will also be joined by Sebastián Yatra.

"We're both putting out new music too," Iglesias said during the event, adding in Spanish, "This is a historic moment and we've been wanting to do this for a long time... The show will be spectacular."

Martin added, "There's nothing like standing on stage and feeling the power of thousands of people and getting up and to dance." The two also mentioned the possibility of recording a song together, explaining that they have been talking about collaborating for a long time.

Following the announcement, Yatra exclusively told ET, "It’s a huge dream come true and one that I never imagined was possible with two of my biggest idols, the people who have influenced me so much over the years. We're going to enjoy this tour and I'm grateful to Ricky and Enrique. I'm ready to learn from them, see more of the United States and enjoy this special moment."

== Setlist ==
The following setlist is taken from the singers' performances at MGM Grand Garden Arena on September 25. It is not meant to represent all shows.

Ricky Martin
1. "Livin' la Vida Loca"
2. "La Bomba"
3. "Qué Rico Fuera"
4. "Vuelve"
5. "Lola, Lola"
6. "She Bangs"
7. "Shake Your Bon-Bon"
8. "Nobody Wants to Be Lonely"
9. "Pégate"
10. "La Mordidita"
11. "María"
12. "Vente Pa' Ca"

Encore

13. "The Cup of Life"
Enrique Iglesias
1. "I'm a Freak"
2. "Chasing the Sun"
3. "I Like How It Feels"
4. "Duele el Corazón"
5. "Bailamos"
6. "Cuando Me Enamoro"
7. "Loco"
8. "Me Pasé"
9. "Súbeme la Radio"
10. "Be With You"
11. "Escape"
12. "Tonight (I'm Lovin' You)"

Encore

13. "Hero"
14. "El Perdón"
15. "Bailando"
16. "I Like It"

== Shows ==
List of concerts, showing date, city, country, venue, opening act, tickets sold, number of available tickets and amount of gross revenue
Date	City	Country	Venue	Opening act(s)
Leg 1 — North America
September 25, 2021	Las Vegas	United States	MGM Grand Garden Arena	Sebastián Yatra
September 30, 2021	Rosemont	United States	Allstate Arena	Sebastián Yatra
October 1, 2021	Rosemont	United States	Allstate Arena	Sebastián Yatra
October 5, 2021	Boston	United States	TD Garden	Sebastián Yatra
October 7, 2021	Toronto	Canada	Scotiabank Arena	Sebastián Yatra
October 8, 2021	Toronto	Canada	Scotiabank Arena	Sebastián Yatra
October 9, 2021	Montreal	Canada	Bell Centre	Sebastián Yatra
October 13, 2021	Philadelphia	United States	Wells Fargo Center	Sebastián Yatra
October 14, 2021	Washington, D.C.	United States	Capital One Arena	Sebastián Yatra
October 16, 2021	Newark	United States	Prudential Center	Sebastián Yatra
October 17, 2021	New York City	United States	Madison Square Garden	Sebastián Yatra
October 22, 2021	Miami	United States	FTX Arena	Sebastián Yatra
October 23, 2021	Miami	United States	FTX Arena	Sebastián Yatra
October 29, 2021	Atlanta	United States	State Farm Arena	Sebastián Yatra
October 30, 2021	Orlando	United States	Amway Center	Sebastián Yatra
November 3, 2021	Dallas	United States	American Airlines Center	Sebastián Yatra
November 5, 2021	Houston	United States	Toyota Center	Sebastián Yatra
November 6, 2021	San Antonio	United States	AT&T Center	Sebastián Yatra
November 7, 2021	Edinburg	United States	Bert Ogden Arena	Sebastián Yatra
November 10, 2021	El Paso	United States	Don Haskins Center	Sebastián Yatra
November 11, 2021	Glendale	United States	Gila River Arena	Sebastián Yatra
November 13, 2021	Sacramento	United States	Golden 1 Center	Sebastián Yatra
November 14, 2021	San Jose	United States	SAP Center	Sebastián Yatra
November 18, 2021	Los Angeles	United States	Staples Center	Sebastián Yatra
November 19, 2021	Los Angeles	United States	Staples Center	Sebastián Yatra
November 20, 2021	Anaheim	United States	Honda Center	Sebastián Yatra
