= La Bomba (Ricky Martin song) =

1998 single by Ricky Martin

Single by Ricky Martin

from the album Vuelve
- Language: Spanish.
- English title: The Bomb
- B-side: "The Cup of Life"; "Hagamos el Amor" (Remix)
- Written: 2003
- Published: May 27, 2003.
- Released: June 16, 1998
- Recorded: 1997
- Genre: Salsa; dance; samba; bomba; pop
- Length: 4:34
- Label: Columbia; Sony Discos
- Songwriters: Luis Gómez-Escolar; K. C. Porter; Draco Rosa
- Producers: Porter; Draco Rosa

Ricky Martin singles chronology
"The Cup of Life" (1998)	"La Bomba" (1998)	"Perdido Sin Ti" (1998)

Music video
- "La Bomba" on YouTube

"La Bomba" (transl. "The Bomb") is a song recorded by Puerto Rican singer Ricky Martin for his fourth studio album, Vuelve (1998). The song was written by Luis Gómez-Escolar, K. C. Porter, and Draco Rosa, while the production was handled by the latter two. It was released by Columbia Records as the third single from the album on June 16, 1998. A Spanish-language salsa, dance, samba, bomba, and pop song, it is a metaphor in which Martin compares the music that makes the listener high from the rhythm of the dance to an alcoholic drink. The song received widely positive reviews from music critics, who complimented the danceable rhythm and highlighted it as one of the album's best tracks.

"La Bomba" won the award for Best Danceable Tune at the 1999 Premios Eres. The song was commercially successful, reaching the top-five in several Spanish-speaking countries, including Guatemala and Spain. The accompanying music video was filmed in Miami, and directed by Wayne Isham. It shows Martin singing and dancing surrounded by people. The song was included on the set lists for all of Martin's tours since 1998, while he also performed it at the 8th Annual Latin Grammy Awards. Several contestants on various dance competition talent shows have danced to the song, including Louis Smith and Flavia Cacace.

== Background and composition ==
"La Bomba"
A 15-second sample of the chorus, which features an up-tempo melody.

In 1995, Ricky Martin released his third studio album A Medio Vivir. On it, he shifted from his traditional ballad-style compositions to a riskier fusion of music focused on traditional Latin sounds, epitomized by the song "María". Taken aback by the starkly different musical style, the executives at his record label Sony Music Mexico felt the song would ruin Martin's career. Despite this, "María" was chosen as the album's second single and became a breakthrough hit, reaching number one in 20 countries. As of 2014, A Medio Vivir has sold over three million copies worldwide. While on tour in 1997, Martin returned to the studio and began recording material for his fourth studio album. He said the experience of touring and recording at the same time was "brutal and incredibly intense". On December 7, 1997, Martin confirmed he was completing his next project and that the album would be released in February of the following year. He worked on the album with producers K.C. Porter and Robi Rosa, and recorded it in studios across the United States, Puerto Rico, and Spain. The album's title, Vuelve, was announced on January 25, 1998. In an interview with CNN en Español, he emphasized the album is going to "reaffirm the internationalization of my career and I know that it will help me a lot to destroy the stereotypes that may exist with my culture". The album consists mainly of "red-hot" Latin dance numbers and "melodramatic" pop ballads.

A Spanish language up-tempo dance song, "La Bomba", along with "Por Arriba, Por Abajo" and "Lola, Lola" combines salsa music with elements of rumba, jazz, and rock. Ramiro Burr of the San Antonio Express-News described "La Bomba" as "samba-flavored", a statement which The Dallas Morning News editor Mario Tarradell echoed. The track features Cuban musician Paquito Hechavarría on the piano solo. The song was written by Rosa, Porter, and Spanish musician Luis Gómez-Escolar, with the production being handled by Rosa and Porter, It runs for a total of 4 minutes and 34 seconds. The song's title, which translates to "the Bomb" in English, is derived from the Afro-Puerto Rican dance music of the same name. Lyrically, it is a metaphor in which Martin compares the bomba music, a genre native to Puerto Rico, "to a drink that makes you drunk; the listener is high from the rhythm of the dance".

== Release and promotion ==
A screenshot from the music video, depicting Martin singing the song and dancing to it.

"La Bomba" was released on CD as the album's third single on June 16, 1998. The track was included as the sixth track on Martin's fourth studio album Vuelve on February 12, 1998. A CD single, titled "La Bomba (Remixes)", which includes four remixes of the song alongside the original, was released in the US by Sony Discos on November 24, 1998. The song's music video was filmed during April 1998 in Miami, and directed by American director Wayne Isham, who had also directed the videos for Martin's previous singles "Vuelve" and "The Cup of Life". It depicts Martin singing and dancing surrounded by people. At the beginning of the visual, he appears in a party on a beach. An author of Cultura Colectiva listed it among the "13 Videos to Appreciate Ricky Martin's Talent and Sickening Good Looks". The clip was later included on Martin's video compilation albums The Ricky Martin Video Collection (1999) and La Historia (2002). The music video was uploaded on the singer's YouTube channel on October 3, 2009. The original version of the song was also added to Martin's compilation albums La Historia (2001), Greatest Hits (2011), Greatest Hits: Souvenir Edition (2013), and Esencial (2018), while the remix version was included on 17 (2008).

== Critical reception ==
"La Bomba" has been met with widely positive reviews from music critics. An author of Cultura Colectiva gave the song a positive review, saying: "This song is one of those that automatically makes you move your hips and destroy the dance floor." Newsday critic Richard Torres praised the track's "hip-swaying elegance", while Selene Moral from Los 40 argued that "there was no nightclub that did not play" the song in the summer of 1998. AllMusic's Jose F. Promis mentioned it as one of the album's highlights, as did Rolling Stone critic David Wild. Burr stated the singer "stokes the fire" on the track. Tarradell listed "La Bomba", along with "Lola, Lola", and "Marcia Baila" as being the record's "best of the bunch".

In 2016, Marco Salazar Nuñez from E! Online placed "La Bomba" on an unranked list of "9 Ricky Martin songs perfect to liven up your own wedding", citing how the song's lyrics "sound perfectly" at the time when drinks would be served. Writing for O, The Oprah Magazine, Amanda Mitchell ranked the track as Martin's ninth best song on her 2019 list, saying like the title suggests, it is, "in fact, 'the bomb'." Leila Cobo from Billboard acknowledged the song as one of his "signature dance hits", while Agustin Gurza from the Los Angeles Times described it as a "festive dance hit".

=== Accolades ===
Los 40 ranked "La Bomba" at number two on a list of "20 songs that turn 20 in 2018". In the same year, El Diario Vasco placed it at number one on the list of "10 songs that turn 20 in top form". The list included the songs that "continue to sound at parties and celebrations" or "have refrains that have never been forgotten" after two decades. In 2021, 20 minutos listed the track among "20 songs from the summers of the '90s". The song won the Eres award for Best Danceable Tune in 1999.

== Commercial performance ==
"La Bomba" is one of Martin's most commercially successful songs in his career. It was a top-five hit in Central American countries, including Costa Rica, El Salvador, Guatemala, and Nicaragua. The song debuted at number 32 on the US Billboard Hot Latin Tracks chart on July 11, 1998, becoming Martin's 16th entry. It subsequently peaked at number 27 on the chart issue dated August 15, 1998. In the same week, the song peaked at numbers 11 and 13 on Billboard's Latin Pop Songs and Tropical/Salsa charts, respectively. In Spain, it reached number five, giving Martin his second top-five hit in the country, following his chart-topper hit, "La Copa de la Vida" (1998). "La Bomba" also peaked in the top 40 of several non Spanish-speaking countries, such as Australia and Sweden.

== Live performances and appearances in media ==
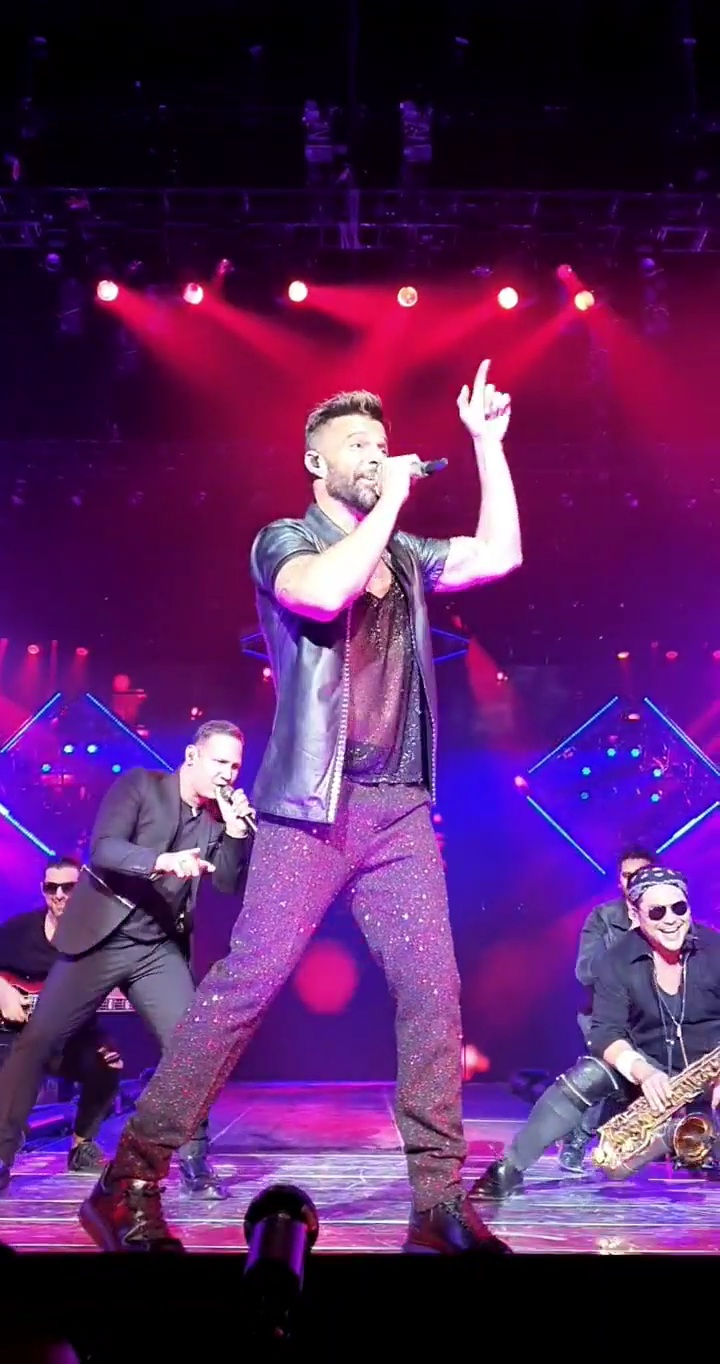
Martin performing "La Bomba" on his Movimiento Tour in 2020.

Martin performed "La Copa de la Vida" and "La Bomba" at the 1998 Festivalbar. The latter was included as part of the setlist for the Vuelve World Tour, the Livin' la Vida Loca Tour, One Night Only with Ricky Martin, Música + Alma + Sexo World Tour, Ricky Martin Live, Live in Mexico, One World Tour, All In, the Movimiento Tour, and the Enrique Iglesias and Ricky Martin Live in Concert. Martin also performed the song along with his other hits during the 48th, 55th, and 61st editions of the Viña del Mar International Song Festival in 2007, 2014, and 2020, respectively.

A live version of "La Bomba" was recorded and taped as part of Martin's MTV Unplugged set in Miami on August 17, 2006. The artist then embarked on the Black and White Tour, including four sold-out shows at the José Miguel Agrelot Coliseum in Puerto Rico. The concerts in Puerto Rico were compiled into his second live album Ricky Martin... Live Black & White Tour (2007) which includes his performance of the track. Martin opened the 8th Annual Latin Grammy Awards on November 8, 2007, by performing "Lola, Lola" and "La Bomba", accompanied by Blue Man Group.

"La Bomba" was featured in the British comedy romance film Born Romantic (2000). The song has been used several times on various dance competition talent shows. In 2012, Louis Smith and Flavia Cacace danced to it on the tenth series of British television dance contest Strictly Come Dancing. Angelina Kirsch and Massimo Sinató did the same on the tenth season of Let's Dance in 2017. On its 2021 challenge, Malika Dzumaev and Zsolt Sándor Cseke used the song along with Martin's other tracks, "María" (1995), "She Bangs" (2000), "Casi un Bolero" (1998), and "Livin' la Vida Loca" (1999), to perform a dance rendition in the styles of samba, cha-cha-cha, rumba, and jive. In 2019, Nicolás Occhiato and Florencia Jazmín Peña danced to "La Bomba", "She Bangs", and "Pégate" on season 14 of Argentine dance competition television series Bailando por un Sueño.

== Formats and track listings ==
- Australian CD maxi-single
1. "La Bomba" (Remix – Radio Edit) – 4:17
2. "La Bomba" (Remix – Long Version) – 9:43
3. "La Bomba" (Remix – Dub Mix) – 7:47
4. "The Cup of Life" – 4:28
- French CD single
1. "La Bomba" – 4:34
2. "Hagamos el Amor" (Remix) – 3:12
- European CD maxi-single
1. "La Bomba" – 4:34
2. "La Bomba" (Remix – Radio Edit) – 4:17
3. "La Bomba" (Remix – Long Version) – 9:43
- European 12-inch single
1. "La Bomba" – 4:34
2. "La Bomba" (Remix – Long Version) – 9:43
3. "La Bomba" (Remix – Radio Edit) – 4:17
4. "La Bomba" (Remix – Dub Mix) – 7:47
- US CD single
1. "La Bomba" (Spanglish Remix) – 3:50
2. "La Bomba" (Remix – Radio Edit) – 4:17
3. "La Bomba" (Remix – Dub Mix) – 7:45
4. "La Bomba" (Remix – Long Version) – 9:43
5. "La Bomba" – 4:33

== Credits and personnel ==
Credits are adapted from Tidal.

- Ricky Martin – vocal, associated performer
- Robi Rosa – composer, lyricist, producer, background vocal, recording engineer
- K.C. Porter – composer, lyricist, producer, piano
- Luis Gómez-Escolar – composer, lyricist
- David Campbell – arranger
- Jeff Shannon – assistant engineer
- Jorge M. Jaramillo – assistant engineer
- Juan Rosario – assistant engineer
- Jules Condar – assistant engineer, recording engineer
- Kieran Murray – assistant engineer
- Rafa Sardina – assistant engineer
- Robert Valdez – assistant engineer
- Scott Kieklak – assistant engineer
- Teresa Cassin – assistant engineer
- Paul Gordon – assistant engineer
- Bill Smith – assistant engineer
- Luis Villanueva – assistant engineer
- Alberto Pino – assistant engineer
- Dave Dominguez – assistant engineer
- Francisco "Panchoî" – assistant engineer
- Tomaselli – assistant engineer
- Gene Lo – assistant engineer
- Iris Salazar – assistant engineer
- Julia Waters – background vocal
- Phil Perry – background vocal
- Ricky Nelson – background vocal
- John West – background vocal
- Darryl Phinnessee – background vocal
- Josie Aiello – background vocal
- Oren Waters – background vocal
- Carmen Twillie – background vocal
- Stefanie Spruill – background vocal
- James Gilstrap – background vocal
- Kristle Murden – background vocal
- Marlena Jeter – background vocal
- Bunny Hill – background vocal
- GB Dorsey – background vocal
- Jackeline Simley – background vocal
- Katrina Harper – background vocal
- Martonette Jenkins – background vocal
- Maxine Jeter – background vocal
- Phillip Ingram – background vocal
- Reggie Hamilton – bass
- Curt Bisquera – drums
- Michael Landau – electric guitar
- Leo Herrera – mixing engineer
- Bobby Rothstein – mixing engineer
- Chris Brooke – mixing engineer
- Jun Murakawa – mixing engineer
- Luis Quiñe – mixing engineer
- Mike Ainsworth – mixing engineer
- Tony Pelusso – mixing engineer
- Mike Aarvold – mixing engineer
- Travis Smith – mixing engineer
- Chris Carroll – mixing engineer
- Todd Keller – mixing engineer
- Randy Waldman – piano
- John Beasley – piano
- Esteban Villanueva – project coordintor, recording engineer
- Iris Aponte – project coordintor
- Sarah Wykes – project coordintor
- Steve Churchyard – recording engineer
- John Lowson – recording engineer
- Ted Stein – recording engineer
- Robert Fernandez – recording engineer
- Brian Jenkins – recording engineer
- Doc Wiley – recording engineer
- Benny Faccone – recording engineer
- Carlos Nieto – recording engineer
- Charles Dye – recording engineer
- Danny Vicari – recording engineer
- Femio Hernandez – recording engineer
- Héctor Iván Rosa – recording engineer
- Jeff Poe – recording engineer
- Jesus "Chuy" Flores – recording engineer
- John Karpowich – recording engineer
- Karl Cameron – recording engineer
- Keith Rose – recording engineer
- Luis Fernando Soria – recording engineer
- Matt Ross Hyde – recording engineer
- Peter McCabe – recording engineer
- Rik Pekkonen – recording engineer

== Charts ==
Chart performance for "La Bomba"
Chart (1998)	Peak position
Australia (ARIA)	27
Costa Rica (Notimex)	4
Belgium (Ultratip Bubbling Under Flanders)	17
El Salvador (Notimex)	2
Europe (European Hot 100 Singles)	69
Finland (Finnish Top 50 Hits)	30
France (SNEP)	45
Germany (GfK)	90
Guatemala (Notimex)	2
Mexico ballad/pop (Notimex)	3
Nicaragua (Notimex)	3
Spain (AFYVE)	5
Sweden (Sverigetopplistan)	31
US Hot Latin Songs (Billboard)	27
US Latin Pop Airplay (Billboard)	11
US Tropical Airplay (Billboard)	13

== Release history ==
Release dates and formats for "La Bomba"
Region	Date	Format(s)	Label	Ref.
Europe	June 16, 1998	CD maxi-single	Columbia Records	
Latin America	July 24, 1998	Promotional CD	Columbia Records	
