= 2001 World Music Awards =

13th award event

The 2001 World Music Awards (13th Annual World Music Awards) were held in the Sporting Club, Monaco on May 2, 2001. The World Music Awards recognised the best-selling artists around the world based on statistics supplied by the International Federation of Phonographic Industries (IFPI). The show was later broadcast by ABC on May 28, 2001. The show was hosted by actress Carmen Electra and R&B artist Sisqo. Proceeds from ticket sales to the show went to the Monaco-based children's charity Monaco Aide & Présence whose patron, Prince Albert, was also patron of the World Music Awards. Performers included Ricky Martin, Christina Aguilera, Enya, Nelly, Rod Stewart, Anastacia, Aqua, Yannick, Peter Maffay, Alsou, Cheb Mami, Samira Said, Razan and Julio Iglesias Jr.

== Winners ==
- World's Best-Selling Alternative Artist: Moby
- World's Best-Selling Dance Male Artist: Ricky Martin
- World's Best-Selling Dance Female Artist: Britney Spears
- World's Best-Selling Dance Group: Backstreet Boys
- World's Best-Selling Latin Male Artist: Ricky Martin
- World's Best-Selling Latin Female Artist: Christina Aguilera
- World's Best-Selling Latin Group: Santana
- World's Best-Selling New Female Pop Artist: Anastacia
- World's Best-Selling New Male Artist: Nelly
- World's Best-Selling New Age Artist: Enya
- World's Best-Selling Pop Male Artist: Ricky Martin
- World's Best-Selling Pop Female Artist: Britney Spears
- World's Best-Selling Pop Group: Backstreet Boys
- World's Best-Selling Pop/Rock Artist: Madonna
- World's Best-Selling Pop/Rock Group: The Beatles
- World's Best-Selling Rap Artist: Eminem
- World's Best-Selling Rock Group: Santana
- World's Best-Selling R&B Male Artist: Sisqo
- World's Best-Selling African Artist: Yannick
- World's Best-Selling American Female Artist: Britney Spears
- World's Best-Selling American Male Artist: Eminem
- World's Best-Selling American Group: Backstreet Boys
- World's Best-Selling Arabic Artist: Cheb Mami
- World's Best-Selling Asian Artist: Ayumi Hamasaki
- World's Best-Selling Australian Group: Savage Garden
- World's Best-Selling Benelux Female Artist: Lara Fabian
- World's Best-Selling Benelux Group: Vengaboys
- World's Best-Selling British Group: The Beatles
- World's Best-Selling Female British Artist: Sonique
- World's Best-Selling Canadian Artist: Shania Twain
- World's Best-Selling Chinese Artist: Elva
- World's Best-Selling French Artist: Hélène Ségara
- World's Best-Selling German Artist: Peter Maffay
- World's Best-Selling German Group: Pur
- World's Best-Selling Irish Artist: Enya
- World's Best-Selling Italian Artist: Eros Ramazzotti
- World's Best-Selling Russian Artist: Alsou
- World's Best-Selling Russian Group: B2
- World's Best-Selling Scandinavian Group: Aqua
- World's Best-Selling Swiss Artist: Gölä
- Chopard Diamond Award: Rod Stewart
