= She Bangs =

2000 single by Ricky Martin

Single by Ricky Martin

from the album Sound Loaded
- B-side: "Por Arriba, Por Abajo"; "Amor"
- Released: September 22, 2000
- Studio: Sony Music, New York City; Hit Factory Criteria & Gentleman's Club, Miami; WallyWorld & Capitol, Hollywood; Aireborne, Indianapolis; Quad Recordings, Nashville
- Genre: Latin pop; dance-pop; salsa
- Length: 4:42 (album version); 4:06 (radio edit)
- Label: Columbia
- Songwriters: Desmond Child; Walter Afanasieff; Robi Draco Rosa
- Producers: Walter Afanasieff; Robi Draco Rosa

Ricky Martin singles chronology
"Private Emotion" (2000)	"She Bangs" (2000)	"Nobody Wants to Be Lonely" (2001)

Music videos
- "She Bangs" on YouTube
- "She Bangs" (Spanish Ver.) on YouTube

"She Bangs" is a song recorded by Puerto Rican singer Ricky Martin for his sixth studio album, Sound Loaded (2000). The song was written by Desmond Child, Walter Afanasieff, and Draco Rosa, while the production was handled by Afanasieff and Rosa. It was released to radio stations by Columbia Records as the lead single from the album on September 22, 2000. A dance track with Latin and salsa music influences, its lyrics see Martin wanting to hold on to a woman, and the song is a "metaphor for the universe". The song received widely positive reviews from music critics, who often noted similarities with Martin's 1999 single "Livin' la Vida Loca", and received a nomination for Best Male Pop Vocal Performance at the 2001 Grammy Awards. "She Bangs" was commercially successful, reaching number one in seven countries, including Italy and Sweden, as well as the top five in Australia, Canada, the United Kingdom, and several other countries.

A Spanish-language version of "She Bangs" was recorded under the same title and reached the summit of the Billboard Hot Latin Tracks chart in the United States. To promote the original version of the song, Martin performed it on several television programs and award shows, including both the Billboard Music Awards and the MTV Europe Music Awards in 2000. The music video for the song was filmed in the Bahamas and directed by Wayne Isham. The suggested sexual content of the video caused controversy and led to it being banned in several Latin American countries. Despite the backlash, the visual won the Latin Grammy Award for Best Music Video, the Lo Nuestro Award for Video of the Year, and the Billboard Music Video Award for Best Clip of the Year — Latin, all in 2001. The song has been covered by several artists, including William Hung on American Idol in 2004. His cover version received generally unfavorable responses from both the judges at the show and music critics.

== Background and release ==
From 1999 to 2000, Martin embarked on his fifth tour the Livin' la Vida Loca Tour to promote his first English album Ricky Martin. While on tour in 2000, Martin returned to the studio and began recording material for Sound Loaded. On August 29, 2000, El Siglo de Torreón revealed the lead single's name as "She Bangs" in an article and mentioned that in addition to the original version of the song that is in English, it will feature a Spanish version. In an interview with the newspaper, Martin's then representative Ricardo Cordero said "'She Bangs' is going to show Ricky one step further up in his career", and announced the possibilities of Martin performing an acoustic concert for MTV. Also, Martin's publicist Nanette Camboy told El Siglo de Torreón that although "Ricky is still putting the final touches on his production in studios in Miami and New York", the song's music video had already been shot in the Bahamas on August 15, 2000.

Columbia Records released "She Bangs" to radio stations in several countries on September 22, 2000, as the lead single from the album. Thereafter, the song was released to the singles markets in October. "She Bangs" was included as the first track on Martin's sixth studio album Sound Loaded, released November 14, 2000, and the Spanish version was included as the tenth track.

== Composition and lyrics ==
"She Bangs"
A 15-second sample of the chorus, which features an "uptempo" melody.

Musically, "She Bangs" is a dance song that features Latin and salsa music influences, and lasts for 4:42. According to Alfred Publishing Company's digital sheet music for the song, "She Bangs" is composed in the key of F♯ minor and set in the time signature of common time, with a groove of 142 beats per minute. Martin's vocals span from the low note of D_{4} to the high note of F♯_{5}. The song's instrumentation features "powerful" percussion, trumpet blasts, and tropical beats. Chris Willman of Entertainment Weekly wrote that the song begins with a "teasing snatch" of a "sputtering" Spanish guitar, before the disco beats start. The beats are followed by an "equally inevitable [...] driving" horn section, which Willman called reminiscent of the one on Martin's 1999 single "Livin' la Vida Loca". "She Bangs" was written by Desmond Child, Walter Afanasieff, and Draco Rosa, while the production was handled by Afanasieff and Rosa. Also, Glenn Monroig, Julia Sierra and Daniel López joined the original version's lyricists to write the Spanish version.

Lyrically, "She Bangs" is similar to the singer's previous singles "María" (1995) and "Livin la Vida Loca"; it tells a "tale of a wild woman who may be hard to let go and even harder to hold". Desmond Child told ABC News that "She Bangs" is "a metaphor for the universe", and explained about it: "You know the big bang theory? So the universe is really this 'mother universe' — she bangs, and explodes [...] She moves. The planets, the galaxies, are all moving. That's what it means." Billboard wrote that the song's lyrics are "insane" and will make cynics drive away in a triumph, "Talk to me, tell me the news/ You'll wear me out like a pair of shoes/We'll dance until the band goes home/Then you're gone, yeah baby."

== Critical reception ==
"She Bangs" was met with widely positive reviews from music critics. The staff of Billboard magazine praised the song and wrote that "She Bangs" is "simply manic with exuberance and energy", being designed to ignite the flavor of "Livin' la Vida Loca". According to the staff, the single was just what the radio needed at the time of release, a "summertime smash" in the fall season. Also from Billboard, Taylor Mims described it as a "danceable track meshed a salsa flare with heavy rock guitar and an irresistible pop beat for universal appeal". Similarly to the staff, Allison Stewart from the Chicago Tribune called the song "clamorous" but thought that it replicates "Livin' La Vida Loca". Sean Piccoli and Lawrence A. Johnson of the Sun-Sentinel agreed with Stewart and noted that the resemblance of the song is a result of both songs being produced by Rosa. The two of them further noted that the song's credits include a personnel consisting of 34 people, opining the "life of any serious party knows: It's all about the entourage".

Writing for O, The Oprah Magazine, Amanda Mitchell complimented the song, saying it "solidified Martin's place as a crossover artist thanks to the salsa-infused pop and the double entendre lyrics". She also ranked "She Bangs" as Martin's best song on her 2019 list. In 2020, MTV Argentina ranked it as one of Martin's best songs, and Luca Mastinu from Optimagazine listed it as one of Martin's five greatest hits. He also called the track a "Latin American bomb" and stated that it "is still present in the playlists of all the occasions when you need to ignite the party". Geoff Boucher of the Los Angeles Times noted that the erotic images of the song and accompanying music video are "up a notch" from "Livin' la Vida Loca" "and will likely do no harm to Martin's hunk status". In a review of Sound Loaded, the Orlando Sentinel's Jim Abbott labeled "She Bangs" and "Loaded" as "'bon-bon' shakers". Both Felix Contreras from NPR and Rolling Stone staff described "She Bangs" as a "megahit".

=== Accolades ===
Jose F. Promis from AllMusic called the song "electrifying" and stated that it is arguably one of best songs of the 2000s, and Billboard ranked the track as the 85th greatest song of 2000. At the 43rd Annual Grammy Awards in 2001, "She Bangs" was nominated for Best Male Pop Vocal Performance. The track was recognized as one of the best-performing pop songs at the 2002 BMI Pop Awards. At the 16th Annual International Dance Music Awards, presented in 2001, the single won the award for Best Latin 12".

== Commercial performance ==
On October 29, 2000, "She Bangs" debuted and peaked at number three on the Australian Singles Chart. It spent 6 weeks in the top 10 of the chart, before slowly starting to decline on it, though lasted on the chart for a total of 15 weeks. The song was certified platinum by the Australian Recording Industry Association (ARIA), denoting shipments of over 70,000 copies in Australia. In New Zealand, the song debuted at number 31 on the singles chart, on October 15, 2000. The next week, the song rose 15 places to number 15, going on to reach its peak of number 2 on December 3 of that year. In the United Kingdom, "She Bangs" reached a peak of number three on November 4, 2000, similarly to the charts of other nations, and stayed on the UK Singles Chart for 15 weeks. The song was later certified silver by the British Phonographic Industry (BPI), indicating shipments of over 200,000 copies in the country. In continental Europe, it was most successful on the Italian and the Swedish charts, on which the song peaked at number one. Additionally, the song was certified gold by the Swedish Recording Industry Association (GLF), denoting sales of over 15,000 copies in Sweden. It was also successful in Spain, peaking at number two, while the song reached number three in Finland, number four in Norway, and number seven in Switzerland. In Latin America, the song peaked at number nine in both El Salvador and Guatemala, number five in Nicaragua, and number one in Argentina, Chile, and Uruguay. The song was also a chart topper in Hong Kong and South Africa.

"She Bangs" debuted at number 38 on the US Billboard Hot 100 chart. After several weeks on the chart, the track reached its peak of number 12. As of January 2011, the track has sold over 152,000 digital copies in the United States and stands as Martin's second best-selling single, only behind "Livin' la Vida Loca". The Spanish version was more successful on the country's Hot Latin Tracks and Tropical/Salsa Airplay charts, both of which it peaked at number one on, and became his fifth number one song on the former chart. The track further peaked at number two on the US Latin Pop Airplay chart and number eight on the Mainstream Top 40. On the Adult Top 40 and Dance Club Play charts, "She Bangs" peaked at numbers 24 and 27, respectively. The track was more successful in Canada, reaching number three on the Canada Top Singles chart. It experienced moderate chart success in Japan, peaking at number 58.

== Music video ==
=== Development and synopsis ===
A screenshot from the music video, depicting Martin dancing in an underwater nightclub.

The music video for "She Bangs" was directed by Wayne Isham and shot at the Atlantis Paradise Island hotel in the Bahamas. Isham had worked on some of Martin's previous videos, including the ones for "La Copa de la Vida" (1998) and "Shake Your Bon-Bon". The singer described the concept of the video as being part of a trilogy with "María" and "Livin' la Vida Loca", "with this girl who drives me crazy because she's crazy, she won't talk to me or tell me her name". Martin told Univision he envisioned the visual taking place in Atlantis and felt that the Bahamas was the perfect place to film it. Jamie King was responsible for the creative direction of the video and over 100 people were involved in the production process. A body double for Martin was used during the scenes with sharks. The Spanish version of the music video premiered on September 26, 2000, for the Hispanophone market, while the English version debuted on MTV's Making the Video series the following day.

The video begins with a group of women on a beach at night swimming to an underwater nightclub, with Martin following them. Martin explained that filming the scene was hard for him because he had to resist without taking air for a long time, as well as having to mime the lyrics without blowing bubbles out of his mouth. Upon entering the nightclub, Martin proceeds to sing "She Bangs" as he dances with the people in the club, with several scenes resembling an orgy. In one scene, Martin sees himself being seduced by mermaids and is later taken into a closet, in which he dances erotically with several women. Near the end of the visual, Martin spills a bottle of water on himself and the people nearby him. The music video concludes with him returning to the surface at daylight. American actor and dancer Channing Tatum makes an appearance in the video as a shirtless bartender and dancer among many other dancers, which was at the beginning of his career.

=== Reception and controversy ===
The explicit sexual scenes of the music video were met with criticism from the audience; several American television stations cut the scenes when airing the video. According to the Daily Record's John Dingwall, with the visual, Martin ditched his teen idol image by transforming to a more mature one. It was consequently banned in several Latin American countries, such as the Dominican Republic. Martin told MTV News that the video represented freedom rather than his sexuality. Writing for Mitú, Cristal Mesa complimented the visual, saying: "The use of underwater Martin shots cropped onto the dance floor is pretty amazing". She also ranked "She Bangs" as Martin's 15th best music video on her 2018 list. At the 2nd Annual Latin Grammy Awards in 2001, the video was awarded Best Short Form Music Video. That same year, it won the award for Video of the Year at the 13th Lo Nuestro Awards, as well as Best Clip of the Year — Latin at the Billboard Music Video Awards.

== Live performances ==
Martin gave his first live performance of "She Bangs" on the BBC's Top of the Pops on November 3, 2000. Later that year, he performed it live at the 2000 Billboard Music Awards on December 5. To promote the song in Mexico, he performed it on the television programs Al Fin de Semana and Otro Rollo that same year. At the 2000 MTV Europe Music Awards, Martin was accompanied by underwater dancers in tanks while he sung "She Bangs". In his only North American concert of 2001, "She Bangs" was one of the songs Martin performed during the annual Wango Tango in Los Angeles. In the same year, it was sung by Martin at the 43rd Annual TV Week Logie Awards.

The song was included on the set lists for Martin's 2011 Música + Alma + Sexo World Tour, 2013 Australian Tour, and the Enrique Iglesias and Ricky Martin Live in Concert tour. Martin also performed "She Bangs" along with his other hits during the 55th Viña del Mar International Song Festival on February 23, 2014. He performed "Livin' la Vida Loca", "She Bangs" and "Adrenalina" with the show's finalists, and "La Copa de la Vida" with Cristina Scuccia on season two of The Voice of Italy in 2014. Also, on May 13, 2015, he performed "Mr. Put It Down", "Livin' la Vida Loca", "She Bangs", and "The Cup of Life" alongside Clark Beckham, Nick Fradiani, Quentin Alexander, Qaasim Middleton, and Rayvon Owen on fourteenth season's finale of American Idol.

== Cover versions and appearances in media ==
"She Bangs" has been covered by several contestants on various music talent shows. Ronny B performed "She Bangs" on season three of America's Got Talent in 2008. His rendition was poorly received, with judge David Hasselhoff remarking that Ronny B had "zero talent", and he was immediately eliminated afterwards. In 2020, Llama (Drew Carey) delivered a performance of "She Bangs" on season three of The Masked Singer, and in 2010, Wagnar performed the track along with a cover version of "Love Shack" by the B-52's on series seven of The X Factor. Wagner was ranked as one of the most iconic X Factor contestants of all time by Grazia. "She Bangs" was featured in the American animated jukebox musical comedy film Sing 2 (2021).

=== William Hung version ===
"She Bangs"

Song by William Hung

from the album Inspiration
- Released: 2004
- Recorded: 2004
- Length: 3:32
- Label: Koch Entertainment
- Songwriters: Desmond Child; Walter Afanasieff; Robi Draco Rosa; Glenn Monroig; Julia Sierra; Daniel López

Hong Kong–born American motivational speaker and former singer William Hung gained notoriety when he auditioned for the third season of American Idol in 2004. Hung was strongly criticized for his singing and dancing; judge Simon Cowell interrupted his audition and asked him, "You can't sing, you can't dance, so what do you want me to say?" Despite the negative reception, Hung gained a following after his performance and ultimately signed to Koch Entertainment. Hung released a cover of "She Bangs" on his debut studio album Inspiration (2004), with the cover being generally panned. AllMusic editor Stephen Thomas Erlewine wrote that Hung "sang it as if the song meant something to him even though he didn't understand the words, which gave the Berkeley civil engineering student innocence or, to some of his harsher critics, the appearance of being mildly retarded". Chris Carle of IGN said that it is the "best track... but that's like saying a tetanus shot is the best kind of injection you can get". Clem Bestow wrote for Stylus Magazine that Hung's performance of the song is "like a tone-deaf taxi driver and dancing like an epileptic octopus". The music video for Hung's version was directed by Jeff Richter and filmed in Los Angeles.

On June 3, 2018, Martin invited Hung as a surprise guest to his concert at the Monte Carlo Theater in Las Vegas, and the two performed the original together. In an interview with Variety, 20 years after the release of "She Bangs", Hung told the magazine that he's "grateful" to have Martin's song, and explained that "otherwise I wouldn't be where I am today. I just enjoyed the song right from the beginning. I thought it sounded cool and very upbeat. It was unique compared to everything else I was hearing back in the early 2000s." On May 2, 2022, coinciding with American Idol's 20th anniversary, Hung returned to the show "to reprise his epic" performance of the song.

== Formats and track listings ==
- Australian maxi-single
1. "She Bangs" (English Edit) – 4:02
2. "She Bangs" (Obadam's English Radio Edit) – 3:59
3. "Por Arriba, Por Abajo" – 3:07
4. "Amor" – 3:27
5. "She Bangs" (Obadam's Afro-Bang Mix) (English) – 7:28
- Brazilian promotional CD single
1. "She Bangs" (Album Version) – 4:40
2. "She Bangs" (Obadam's English Radio) – 4:04
3. "She Bangs" (Obadam's Afro-Bang Mix) (English) – 7:30
4. "She Bangs" (Obadambangadub) – 10:24
- European 12-inch single
1. "She Bangs" (English) – 4:44
2. "She Bangs" (English Edit) – 4:02
3. "She Bangs" (Spanish Edit) – 4:01
4. "She Bangs" (Spanglish Edit) – 4:01
5. "Almost a Love Song (Casi Un Bolero)" – 4:41
- Japanese CD single
1. "She Bangs" (English Radio) – 4:04
2. "She Bangs" (Spanish) – 4:35
3. "She Bangs" (Spanglish) – 4:41
4. "She Bangs" (English) – 4:42
- UK CD 1
1. "She Bangs" (English Edit) – 4:02
2. "She Bangs" (Obadam's English Radio Edit) – 3:59
3. "María" (Spanglish Radio Edit) – 4:30
- UK CD 2
1. "She Bangs" (English Edit) – 4:02
2. "Amor" – 3:27
3. "She Bangs" (Obadam's Afro-Bang Mix) (English) – 7:28
- US 7-incg single
1. "She Bangs" (English Edit) – 4:02
2. "She Bangs" (Spanish Edit) – 4:02

== Credits and personnel ==
=== Recording ===
- Recorded at Sony Music Studios (New York City); The Hit Factory Criteria, the Gentleman's Club (Miami); WallyWorld Studios, Capitol Studios (Hollywood); Aireborne Studios (Indianapolis); Quad Recordings (Nashville)
- Mixed at Sony Music Studios

=== Personnel ===
==== Musicians ====
- Ricky Martin – vocal
- Desmond Child – composer, lyricist, vocal producer
- Walter Afanasieff – composer, lyricist, producer, drum programmer, keyboards
- Robi Rosa – composer, lyricist, producer, executive producer
- Glenn Monroig – additional composer, lyricist for the Spanish version
- Julia Sierra – additional composer, lyricist for the Spanish Version
- Daniel López – percussion, additional composer, lyricist for the Spanish version
- Michael Landau – acoustic guitar, electric guitar
- René Toledo – acoustic guitar
- Michael Migliore – alto saxophone
- Maurice Lauchner – background vocal
- Chris Willis – background vocal
- Will Lee – background vocal
- Ron Grant – background vocal
- Gustavo Laureano – background vocal
- Illyak Negroni – background vocal
- Larry Loftin – background vocal
- Michael Contratto – background vocal
- Robbie Nevil – background vocal
- Ronnie Cuber – baritone saxophone
- Ramses Colón – bass
- Herb Besson – bass
- Rusty Anderson – electric guitar
- Paquito Hechavarría – piano
- Ed Calle – saxophone
- Jerry Vivino – tenor saxophone
- Lenny Pickett – tenor saxophone
- Keith O'Quinn – trombone
- Wayne Andre – trombone
- Richard Rosenberg – trombone
- Dana Teboe – trombone
- Glen Drewes – trumpet
- Earl Gardner – trumpet
- Mark Pender – trumpet
- Danny Cahn – trumpet
- José Sibajas – trumpet
- Scott Healy – arranger

==== Production ====
- Mike Couzi – recording engineer
- Jules Gondar – recording engineer
- Gregg Bieck – recording engineer, macintosh & digital programmer
- David Reitzas – recording engineer
- Dave Gleeson – recording engineer
- Ted Jensen – mastering engineer
- Tony Maserati – mixing engineer
- Jimmy Hoysen – assistant engineer
- Juan Turek – assistant engineer
- Nathan Malki – assistant engineer
- Larry Brooks – assistant engineer
- John Hendrickson – assistant engineer
- Aaron Shannon – assistant engineer
- Andy Manganno – assistant engineer
- Conrad Golding – assistant engineer
- Craig Lozowick – assistant engineer
- Fabian Marascillo – assistant engineer
- Germán Ortiz – assistant engineer
- Robert Conley – additional programmer
- Carlo Tallarico – coordinator
- Brian Coleman – coordinator
- Dean Lawrence – coordinator
- Chris Apostle – coordinator
- Jolie Levine-Aller – coordinator
- Angelo Medina – executive producer
- Phantom Vox – executive producer
- Ricardo Cordero – project coordinator
- Iris Aponte – project coordinator
- Nanette Lamboy – project coordinator

Credits adapted from Tidal and the liner notes of Sound Loaded, Columbia Records.

== Charts ==
=== Weekly charts ===
Weekly peak performance for "She Bangs"
Chart (2000–2001)	Peak position
Argentina (Notimex)	1
Australia (ARIA)	3
Austria (Ö3 Austria Top 40)	28
Belgium (Ultratop 50 Flanders)	21
Belgium (Ultratop 50 Wallonia)	20
Canada Top Singles (RPM)	3 (Note: "She Bangs" reached number 3 when RPM ceased publication in November 2000.)
Canada Adult Contemporary (RPM)	32 (Note: "She Bangs" reached number 32 when RPM ceased publication in November 2000.)
Chile (Notimex)	1
Croatia (HRT)	6
Denmark (IFPI)	9
El Salvador (Notimex)	9
Eurochart Hot 100 (Billboard)	4
Finland (Suomen virallinen lista)	3
France (SNEP)	36
Germany (GfK)	34
Greece Foreign Singles (IFPI Greece)	2
Guatemala (Notimex)	9
Hong Kong (IFPI)	1
Hungary (Music & Media)	4
Iceland (Íslenski Listinn Topp 40)	12
Ireland (IRMA)	8
Italy (FIMI)	1
Japan (Oricon Singles Chart)	58
Netherlands (Dutch Top 40)	20
Netherlands (Single Top 100)	23
New Zealand (Recorded Music NZ)	2
Nicaragua (Notimex)	5
Norway (VG-lista)	4
Poland (Polish Airplay Charts)	2
Romania (Romanian Top 100)	7
Scottish Singles Sales (Official Charts)	2
South Africa (Springbok Radio)	1
Spain (Promusicae)	2
Sweden (Sverigetopplistan)	1
Switzerland (Schweizer Hitparade)	7
UK Singles (Official Charts)	3
Uruguay (Notimex)	1
US Billboard Hot 100	12
US Adult Pop Airplay (Billboard)	24
US Dance Club Songs (Billboard)	27
US Hot Latin Songs (Billboard)	1
US Pop Airplay (Billboard)	8
US Rhythmic Airplay (Billboard)	30
US Top 40 Tracks (Billboard)	8
US Tropical Airplay (Billboard)	1

=== Year-end charts ===
2000 year-end chart performance for "She Bangs"
Chart (2000)	Position
Australia (ARIA)	19
Europe (Eurochart Hot 100)	95
Ireland (IRMA)	81
New Zealand (RIANZ)	50
Norway (VG-lista)	10
Romania (Romanian Top 100)	57
Spain (AFYVE)	17
Sweden (Hitlistan)	39
Switzerland (Schweizer Hitparade)	82
UK Singles (OCC)	62
US Mainstream Top 40 (Billboard)	79

2001 year-end chart performance for "She Bangs"
Chart (2001)	Position
Canada (Nielsen SoundScan)	108
US Adult Top 40 (Billboard)	90

== Certifications ==
Certifications and sales for "She Bangs"
Region	Certification	Certified units/sales
Australia (ARIA)	Platinum	70,000^{^}
Denmark (IFPI Danmark)	Gold	4,000^{^}
Sweden (GLF)	Gold	15,000^{^}
United Kingdom (BPI)	Silver	200,000^{^}
^{^} Shipments figures based on certification alone.

== Release history ==
Release dates and formats for "She Bangs"
Region	Date	Format(s)	Label(s)	Ref.
Japan	October 25, 2000	CD single	Epic	
Taiwan	October 25, 2000	CD single	Columbia	
