= Loaded (Ricky Martin song) =

2001 song by Ricky Martin

Single by Ricky Martin

from the album Sound Loaded
- Released: April 17, 2001
- Recorded: 2000
- Genre: Pop; dance-pop
- Length: 3:53
- Label: Columbia; C2
- Songwriters: Jon Secada; Draco Rosa; George Noriega
- Producers: Emilio Estefan; Draco Rosa; George Noriega

Ricky Martin singles chronology
"Nobody Wants to Be Lonely" (2001)	"Loaded" (2001)	"Amor" (2001)

Music video
- "Loaded" on YouTube

"Loaded" is a single by Ricky Martin, released on April 17, 2001, from his album Sound Loaded. The Spanish-language version is called "Dame Más" (English: "Gimme More").

== Music video ==
The music video, directed by Bob Giraldi, aired in June 2001.

== Chart performance ==
"Loaded" peaked inside top twenty in Sweden (number fourteen), Spain (number eighteen), and the United Kingdom (number nineteen). On the Billboard Hot 100, the single reached number ninety-seven.

== Awards ==
"Loaded" was nominated for the Latin Dance Maxi-single of the Year at the 2002 Latin Billboard Music Awards.

== Live performances ==
Martin delivered a performance of "Loaded" on the BBC's Top of the Pops on July 27, 2001.

== Formats and track listings ==
Australian CD maxi-single

1. "Loaded" – 3:52
2. "Loaded" (Fused - Re-Loaded Mix 03) – 3:41
3. "Loaded" (Monetshot - Edit) – 4:06
4. "Loaded" (Can 7 - Radio Flag Mix) – 4:35
5. "Loaded" (Robbie Rivera - Vocal Mix) – 6:53
6. "Nobody Wants to Be Lonely" (Jazzy Remix Radio Edit) – 3:55

European CD single

1. "Loaded" (George Noriega Radio Edit) – 3:14
2. "Loaded" (Robbie Rivera - Diskofied Vocal Mix) – 6:51

European CD maxi-single #1

1. "Loaded" (George Noriega Radio Edit) – 3:14
2. "Loaded" (Robbie Rivera - Diskofied Vocal Mix) – 6:51
3. "Loaded" (Can 7 - Dame Más Fairground Mix) – 4:00
4. "Loaded" (Video)

European CD maxi-single #2

1. "Loaded" (Can 7 - Dame Más Fairground Mix) – 4:00
2. "Loaded" (Monetshot - Edit) – 4:06
3. "Loaded" (Robbie Rivera - Diskofied Vocal Mix) – 6:51
4. "Loaded" (Fused - Re-Loaded Mix 3) – 3:41
5. "Loaded" (Can 7 - Club Flag Mix) – 8:45

Japanese CD maxi-single

1. "Loaded" – 3:52
2. "Nobody Wants to Be Lonely" (with Christina Aguilera) – 4:11
3. "Sólo Quiero Amarte" (Radio Edit) – 3:59

Spanish promotional CD single

1. "Dame Más" – 3:52

UK CD maxi-single

1. "Loaded" – 3:52
2. "Loaded" (Robbie Rivera - Diskofied Vocal Mix) – 6:51
3. "Loaded" (Can 7 - Dame Más Fairground Mix) – 4:00
4. "Loaded" (Video)

UK promotional CD single

1. "Loaded" (Monetshot Mix) – 6:35
2. "Loaded" (Almighty Mix) – 7:56
3. "Loaded" (Robbie Rivera - Diskofied Vocal Mix) – 6:51
4. "Loaded" (Fused - Re-Loaded Mix #3) – 3:45
5. "Loaded" (Can 7 - Radio Flag Mix) – 4:35
6. "Loaded" (Can 7 - Taste The Music Mix) – 8:30

UK promotional 12" single

1. "Loaded" (Robbie Rivera - Diskofied Vocal Mix) – 6:51
2. "Loaded" (Fused - Re-Loaded Mix 1) – 8:20
3. "Loaded" (Can 7 - Taste The Music Mix) – 8:30
4. "Loaded" (Can 7 - Dame Más Fairground Mix) – 4:00

US CD maxi-single

1. "Loaded" (George Noriega Radio Edit 1) – 3:14
2. "Loaded" (Almighty Mix) – 7:56
3. "Loaded" (Almighty Dub Mix) – 7:59
4. "Loaded" (Robbie Rivera - Diskofied Vocal Mix) – 6:51
5. "Loaded" (Fused Re-Loaded Mix) – 8:20

US promotional CD single

1. "Loaded" (George Noriega Radio Edit 1) – 3:14
2. "Loaded" (George Noriega Radio Edit 2) – 3:49
3. "Loaded" (Album Version) – 3:52

== Charts ==
=== Weekly charts ===
Chart (2001)	Peak position
Australia (ARIA)	66
Belgium (Ultratip Bubbling Under Flanders)	15
Canada (Nielsen SoundScan)	39
Europe (Eurochart Hot 100)	57
Finland (Finnish Top 50 Hits)	41
Germany (GfK)	74
Ireland (IRMA)	45
Italy (FIMI)	22
Netherlands (Single Top 100)	80
Romania (Romanian Top 100)	10
Scotland Singles (OCC)	20
Spain (PROMUSICAE)	18
Sweden (Sverigetopplistan)	14
Switzerland (Schweizer Hitparade)	87
UK Singles (OCC)	19
US Billboard Hot 100	97
US Tropical Airplay (Billboard) "Dame Más"	23

=== Year-end charts ===
Chart (2001)	Position
Romania (Romanian Top 100)	59
Sweden (Hitlistan)	100

== Release history ==
Release dates and formats for Loaded
Region	Date	Format(s)	Label(s)	Ref.
Taiwan	July 4, 2001	CD single	Columbia	
