= Por Arriba, Por Abajo =

- European single cover

Single by Ricky Martin

from the album Vuelve
- Released: November 3, 1998
- Recorded: 1997
- Genre: Latin pop
- Length: 3:07
- Label: Columbia
- Songwriters: Luis Gómez-Escolar; Draco Rosa; César Lemos; Karla Aponte
- Producers: K. C. Porter; Draco Rosa

Ricky Martin singles chronology
"Perdido Sin Ti" (1998)	"Por Arriba, Por Abajo" (1998)	"Casi un Bolero" (1998)

Audio
- "Ricky Martin - Por Arriba, Por Abajo (audio)" on YouTube

"Por Arriba, Por Abajo" (English: "Upwards, Downwards") is the fifth single from Ricky Martin's album, Vuelve (1998). It was released on November 3, 1998. The remixes for the European single release were created by Pablo Flores.

== Music video ==
The music video was shot by Pedro Aznar in December 1998 in Barcelona.

== Chart performance ==
The song reached number thirty-three on the Hot Latin Songs in the United States and number thirteen in Spain.

== Formats and track listings ==
Brazilian promotional CD maxi-single

1. "Por Arriba, Por Abajo (G-VÔ Radio Mix) – 3:46
2. "Por Arriba, Por Abajo (G-VÔ Edit Mix) – 4:33
3. "Por Arriba, Por Abajo (G-VÔ Mix) – 6:52
4. "Por Arriba, Por Abajo (Album Version) – 3:07

European CD maxi-single

1. "Por Arriba, Por Abajo (Batu) (Club Remix) – 9:27
2. "Por Arriba, Por Abajo (Remix Radio Edit) – 4:17
3. "Por Arriba, Por Abajo (Batu) (Acappella Mix) – 6:54

Mexican promotional CD maxi-single

1. "Por Arriba, Por Abajo (Batu) (Club Remix) – 9:27
2. "Por Arriba, Por Abajo (Remix Radio Edit) – 4:17
3. "Por Arriba, Por Abajo (Batu) (Acappella Mix) – 6:54
4. "Por Arriba, Por Abajo – 3:07

== Charts ==
Chart (1998–1999)	Peak position
Spain (Promusicae)	13
US Hot Latin Songs (Billboard)	33
US Latin Pop Airplay (Billboard)	11
US Tropical Airplay (Billboard)	15
