= Livin' la Vida Loca Tour =

1999–2000 concert tour by Ricky Martin

Livin' La Vida Loca World Tour
- World tour by Ricky Martin
- Promotional poster for 2000 tour concerts
- Location: Asia; Europe; North America; Oceania
- Associated album: Ricky Martin
- Start date: October 20, 1999
- End date: October 25, 2000
- Legs: 5
- No. of shows: 103

Ricky Martin concert chronology
- Vuelve World Tour (1998); Livin' La Vida Loca Tour (1999–2000); One Night Only with Ricky Martin (2005–06)

The Livin' La Vida Loca World Tour was the first major world concert tour by Puerto Rican singer Ricky Martin to support his first English-language album Ricky Martin. The tour started in October 1999 and continued until October 2000.

The tour covered four continents, North America, Europe, Asia and Australia. According to 2000 year-end report, Ricky Martin had the 10th highest-grossing tour in the US, with 44 shows grossing $36.3 million and drawing an audience of 617,488. That October, attendance and sales data reported from 60 concert dates in the United States, Canada and Mexico show the tour grossed $51.3 million and drew 875,151 fans, according to Billboard Boxscore, International dates, not reported to Boxscore would push Martin's grosses higher.

== Opening act ==
- Jessica Simpson (North America: Oct.-Dec. 1999 only)

== Set list ==
This set list represents concerts held Summer 2000

1. "Livin' la Vida Loca"
2. "Love You for a Day"
3. "Bombón de Azúcar"
4. "Spanish Eyes"
5. "Lola, Lola"
6. "Vuelve"
7. "She Bangs"
8. "Loaded"
9. "Marcia Baila"
10. "Private Emotion"
11. "I Am Made of You"
12. "Shake Your Bon-Bon"
13. "La Bomba"
14. "Por Arriba, Por Abajo"
15. "María"
16. "She's All I Ever Had"
17. "The Cup of Life"

== Tour dates ==
Date	City	Country	Venue
North America
October 20, 1999	Miami	United States	Miami Arena
October 21, 1999	Miami	United States	Miami Arena
October 22, 1999	Tampa	United States	Ice Palace
October 24, 1999	Atlanta	United States	Philips Arena
October 26, 1999	Philadelphia	United States	First Union Center
October 28, 1999	New York City	United States	Madison Square Garden
October 29, 1999	New York City	United States	Madison Square Garden
October 31, 1999	Chicago	United States	United Center
November 1, 1999	Auburn Hills	United States	The Palace of Auburn Hills
November 4, 1999	Dallas	United States	Reunion Arena
November 6, 1999	San Antonio	United States	Alamodome
November 7, 1999	Houston	United States	Compaq Center
November 11, 1999	Las Vegas	United States	Mandalay Bay Events Center
November 12, 1999	Las Vegas	United States	Mandalay Bay Events Center
November 13, 1999	Los Angeles	United States	Staples Center
November 14, 1999	San Diego	United States	San Diego Sports Arena
November 18, 1999	Phoenix	United States	America West Arena
November 20, 1999	Anaheim	United States	Arrowhead Pond of Anaheim
November 21, 1999	San Jose	United States	San Jose Arena
November 22, 1999	San Jose	United States	San Jose Arena
November 24, 1999	Sacramento	United States	ARCO Arena
November 27, 1999	Salt Lake City	United States	Delta Center
November 28, 1999	Denver	United States	Pepsi Center
November 30, 1999	Kansas City	United States	Kemper Arena
December 1, 1999	St. Louis	United States	Kiel Center
December 3, 1999	Minneapolis	United States	Target Center
December 5, 1999	Cincinnati	United States	Firstar Center
December 6, 1999	Cleveland	United States	Gund Arena
February 11, 2000	San Juan	Puerto Rico	Hiram Bithorn Stadium
February 12, 2000	San Juan	Puerto Rico	Hiram Bithorn Stadium
February 13, 2000	San Juan	Puerto Rico	Hiram Bithorn Stadium
February 26, 2000	Mexico City	Mexico	Foro Sol
March 11, 2000	Vancouver	Canada	General Motors Place
March 13, 2000	Calgary	Canada	Canadian Airlines Saddledome
March 14, 2000	Edmonton	Canada	Skyreach Centre
March 16, 2000	Winnipeg	Canada	Winnipeg Arena
March 18, 2000	Toronto	Canada	SkyDome
March 19, 2000	Toronto	Canada	SkyDome
March 20, 2000	Albany	United States	Pepsi Arena
March 22, 2000	Ottawa	Canada	Corel Centre
March 23, 2000	Montreal	Canada	Molson Centre
March 24, 2000	Montreal	Canada	Molson Centre
March 26, 2000	Honolulu	United States	Blaisdell Arena
March 27, 2000	Honolulu	United States	Blaisdell Arena
Europe
April 26, 2000	Madrid	Spain	Plaza de Toros de Las Ventas
April 27, 2000	Madrid	Spain	Plaza de Toros de Las Ventas
April 29, 2000	Barcelona	Spain	Palau Sant Jordi
April 30, 2000	Barcelona	Spain	Palau Sant Jordi
May 3, 2000	Paris	France	Palais Omnisports de Paris-Bercy
May 5, 2000	Antwerp	Belgium	Sportpaleis
May 6, 2000	Cologne	Germany	Kölnarena
May 8, 2000	Milan	Italy	FilaForum di Assago
May 9, 2000	Milan	Italy	FilaForum di Assago
May 12, 2000	London	England	Earls Court Exhibition Centre
May 13, 2000	London	England	Earls Court Exhibition Centre
North America
June 9, 2000	Sunrise	United States	National Car Rental Center
June 10, 2000	Orlando	United States	TD Waterhouse Centre
June 12, 2000	Charlotte	United States	Charlotte Coliseum
June 13, 2000	Greensboro	United States	Greensboro Coliseum
June 15, 2000	Uniondale	United States	Nassau Veterans Memorial Coliseum
June 16, 2000	Uniondale	United States	Nassau Veterans Memorial Coliseum
June 17, 2000	Hartford	United States	Hartford Civic Center
June 19, 2000	East Rutherford	United States	Continental Airlines Arena
June 20, 2000	East Rutherford	United States	Continental Airlines Arena
June 21, 2000	Boston	United States	FleetCenter
June 22, 2000	Boston	United States	FleetCenter
June 24, 2000	Washington, D.C.	United States	MCI Center
June 25, 2000	Buffalo	United States	HSBC Arena
June 27, 2000	Pittsburgh	United States	Mellon Arena
June 28, 2000	University Park	United States	Bryce Jordan Center
June 30, 2000	Auburn Hills	United States	The Palace of Auburn Hills
July 1, 2000	Chicago	United States	United Center
July 3, 2000	Milwaukee	United States	Bradley Center
July 5, 2000	Indianapolis	United States	Conseco Fieldhouse
July 6, 2000	Columbus	United States	Value City Arena
July 8, 2000	New Orleans	United States	New Orleans Arena
July 10, 2000	Atlanta	United States	Philips Arena
July 11, 2000	Greenville	United States	BI-LO Center
July 12, 2000	Nashville	United States	Gaylord Entertainment Center
July 15, 2000	El Paso	United States	Sun Bowl
July 17, 2000	San Diego	United States	San Diego Sports Arena
July 18, 2000	Phoenix	United States	America West Arena
July 20, 2000	Anaheim	United States	Arrowhead Pond of Anaheim
July 22, 2000	Las Vegas	United States	Mandalay Bay Events Center
July 23, 2000	Reno	United States	Lawlor Events Center
July 24, 2000	Oakland	United States	The Arena in Oakland
July 26, 2000	Tacoma	United States	Tacoma Dome
July 27, 2000	Portland	United States	Rose Garden Arena
Asia
September 26, 2000	Osaka	Japan	Osaka-jō Hall
September 27, 2000	Osaka	Japan	Osaka-jō Hall
September 30, 2000	Tokyo	Japan	Yoyogi National Gymnasium
October 1, 2000	Tokyo	Japan	Yoyogi National Gymnasium
October 4, 2000	Tokyo	Japan	Nippon Budokan
October 5, 2000	Tokyo	Japan	Nippon Budokan
October 7, 2000	Seoul	South Korea	Olympic Stadium
October 9, 2000	Hung Hom	Hong Kong	Hong Kong Coliseum
October 11, 2000	Taipei	Taiwan	Taipei Municipal Stadium
Oceania
October 15, 2000	Auckland	New Zealand	Ericsson Stadium
October 17, 2000	Sydney	Australia	Sydney Entertainment Centre
October 18, 2000	Sydney	Australia	Sydney Entertainment Centre
October 19, 2000	Sydney	Australia	Sydney Entertainment Centre
October 21, 2000	Brisbane	Australia	Brisbane Entertainment Centre
October 25, 2000	Melbourne	Australia	Colonial Stadium

Cancellations and rescheduled shows

October 14, 2000	Auckland, New Zealand	Ericsson Stadium	Rescheduled to October 15, 2000

=== Box office score data ===
Venue	City	Tickets sold / available	Gross revenue
Ice Palace	Tampa	17,571 / 17,571 (100%)	$1,137,910
Philips Arena	Atlanta	14,042 / 14,042 (100%)	$865,596
First Union Center	Philadelphia	14,261 / 14,261 (100%)	$793,815
Madison Square Garden	New York City	29,774 / 29,774 (100%)	$1,826,755
United Center	Chicago	16,707 / 16,707 (100%)	$970,785
The Palace of Auburn Hills	Auburn Hills	17,311 / 17,311 (100%)	$916,665
Reunion Arena	Dallas	14,869 / 14,869 (100%)	$778,655
Alamodome	San Antonio	33,135 / 33,135 (100%)	$1,264,389
Compaq Center	Houston	13,642 / 13,642 (100%)	$725,943
Staples Center	Los Angeles	15,241 / 15,241 (100%)	$959,760
San Diego Sports Arena	San Diego	12,816 / 12,816 (100%)	$670,552
San Jose Arena	San Jose	27,159 / 27,159 (100%)	$1,654,430
Target Center	Minneapolis	11,701 / 14,000 (84%)	$781,055
Firstar Center	Cincinnati	10,543 / 11,811 (89%)	$586,775
Gund Arena	Cleveland	17,247 / 17,247 (100%)	$910,445
Foro Sol	Mexico City	54,431 / 54,431 (100%)	$2,374,959
General Motors Place	Vancouver	13,220 / 13,500 (98%)	$715,861
Canadian Airlines Saddledome	Calgary	12,868 / 12,868 (100%)	$721,667
Skyreach Centre	Edmonton	13,355 / 13,355 (100%)	$769,338
Pepsi Arena	Albany	10,380 / 10,500 (99%)	$614,245
Corel Centre	Ottawa	12,804 / 12,804 (100%)	$611,701
Molson Centre	Montreal	29,715 / 29,715 (100%)	$1,509,989
TD Waterhouse Centre	Orlando	8,545 / 17,712 (48%)	$537,625
Nassau Veterans Memorial Coliseum	Uniondale	25,096 / 29,642 (85%)	$1,662,101
Continental Airlines Arena	East Rutherford	27,336 / 28,000 (98%)	$1,679,950
United Center	Chicago	14,946 / 14,946 (100%)	$968,090
Sun Bowl Stadium	El Paso	46,045 / 51,495 (89%)	$2,944,760
Arrowhead Pond of Anaheim	Anaheim	13,465 / 13,465 (100%)	$863,710
Total		548,225 / 572,019 (96%)	$30,817,526

== See also ==
- List of highest-grossing concert tours by Latin artists
