= List of number-one singles of 1999 (Canada) =

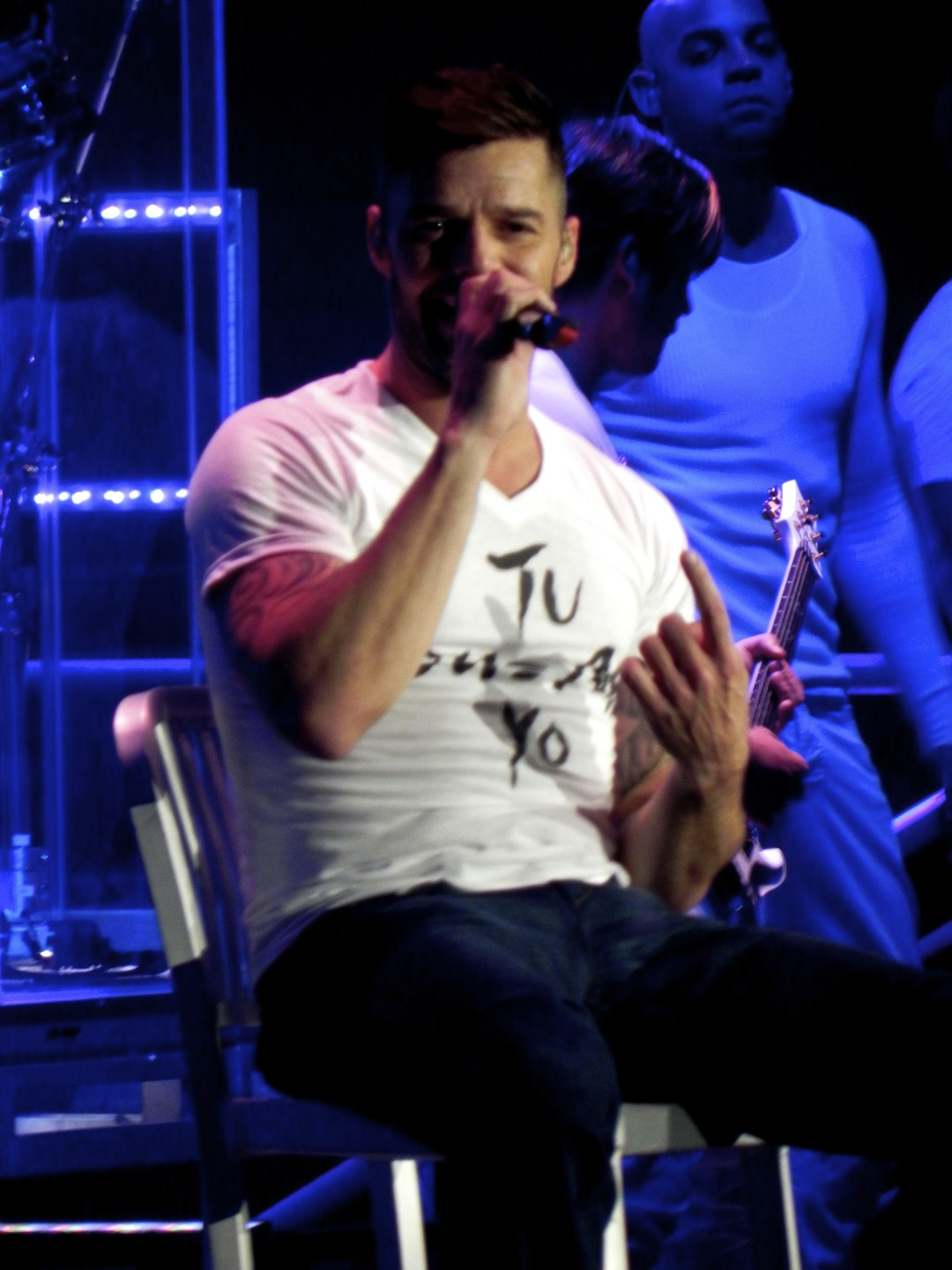
Ricky Martin had the most successful song of Canada during 1999: "Livin' la Vida Loca".

RPM was a Canadian magazine that published the best-performing singles of Canada from 1964 to 2000. During 1999, sixteen different songs reached number one. Canadian singer Alanis Morissette achieved the first number-one single of the year, "Thank U", while Italian group Eiffel 65 became the final musical act to peak at the top spot during the year with "Blue (Da Ba Dee)". Twelve of the sixteen chart-topping songs provided their performers with their first Canadian number-one single; only Alanis Morissette, Cher, Sugar Ray, and Madonna had previously topped the RPM Singles Chart. No artists peaked at number one with multiple singles during the year.

The longest-running number-one single of the year was Lou Bega's "Mambo No. 5 (A Little Bit Of...)", which spent 11 weeks at number one from 21 September to 29 November. The most successful song of the year was "Livin' la Vida Loca" by Ricky Martin, which topped the chart for eight weeks in late spring and early summer. Sugar Ray and Jennifer Lopez were the only other acts to spend at least five weeks at number one, while Cher, Sixpence None the Richer, and Eiffel 65 each stayed at number one for three weeks during 1999. Three Canadian acts earned a number-one single this year: Alanis Morissette, Barenaked Ladies, and Sky.

Key
† Indicates best-performing single of 1999

== Chart history ==
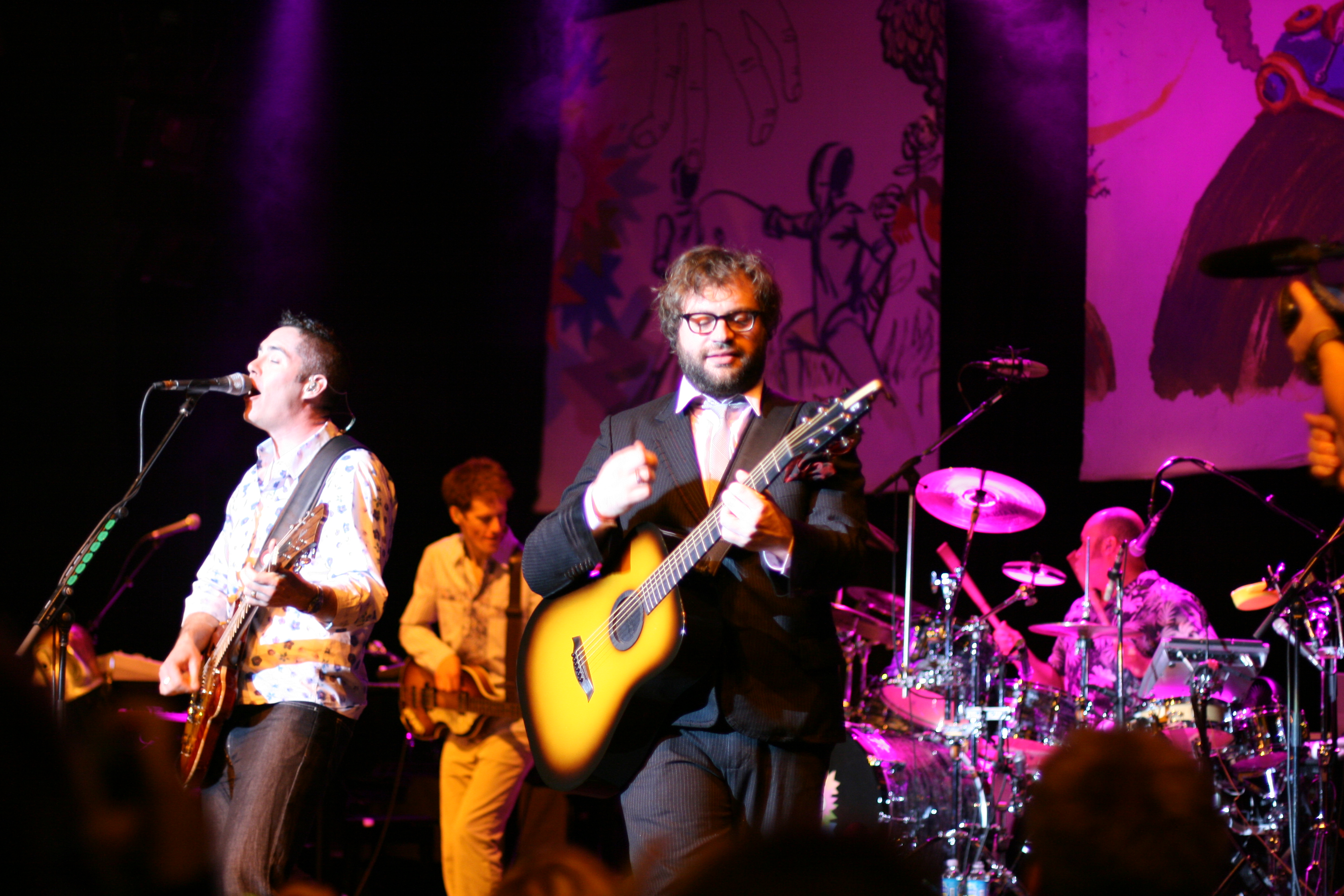
Canadian rock band Barenaked Ladies topped the RPM chart for two weeks with "It's All Been Done".

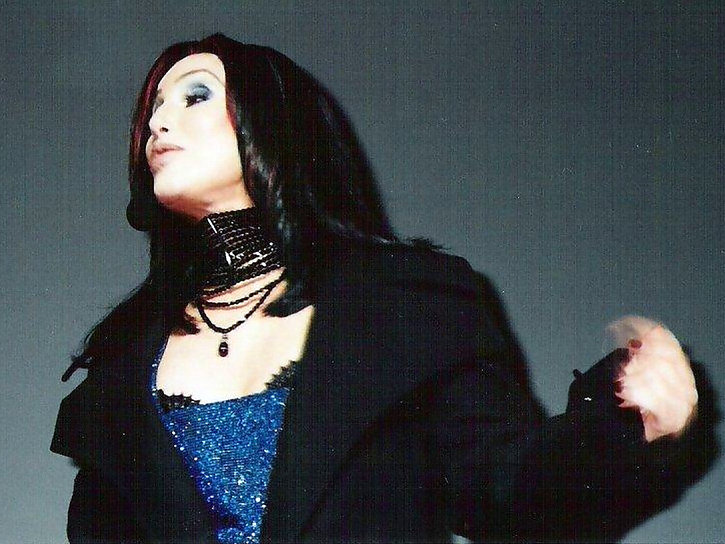
Cher stayed for three weeks at number one with her worldwide hit "Believe" in February and March.

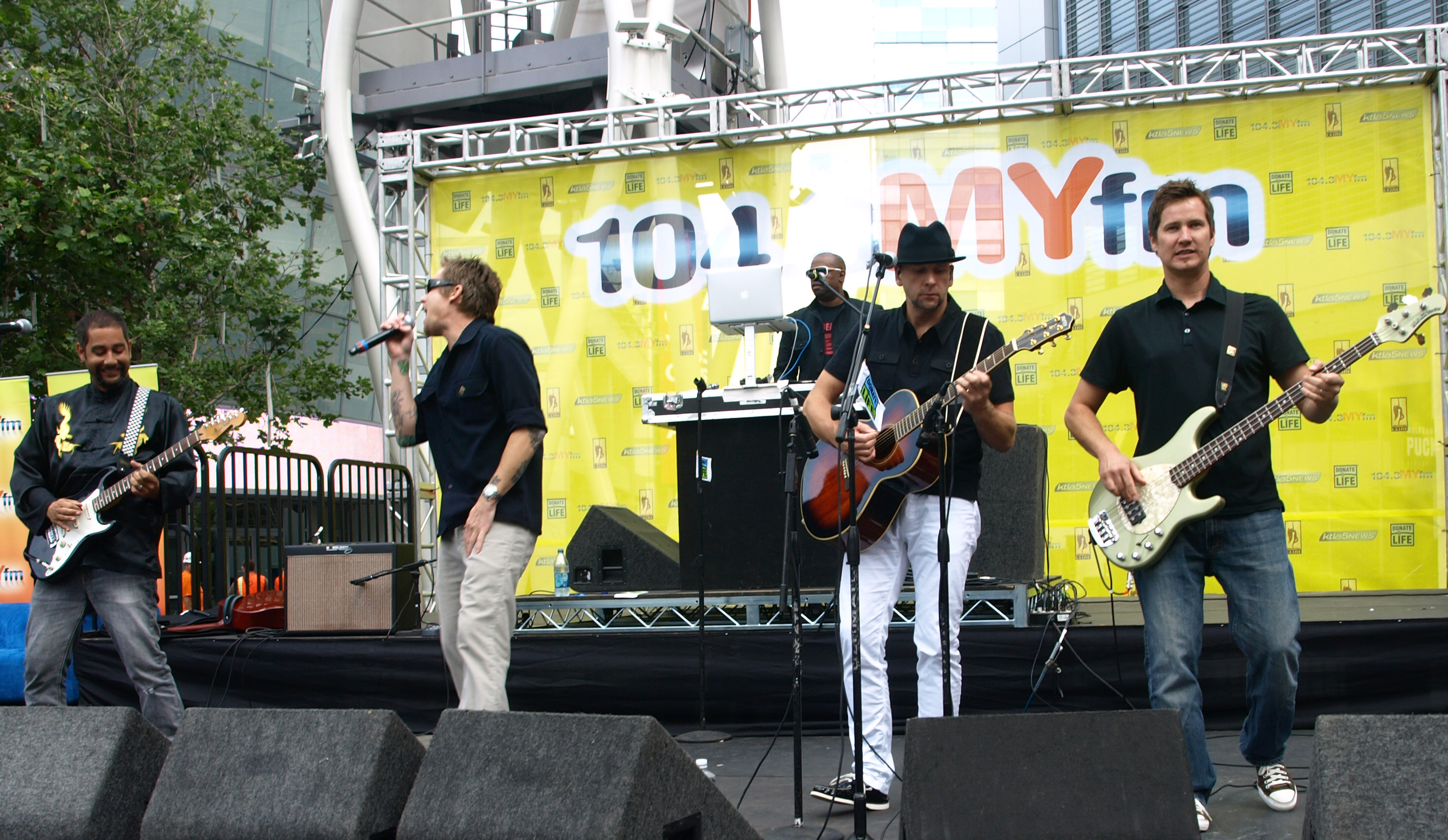
In 1999, Sugar Ray picked up their second Canadian chart-topper with the five-week number one "Every Morning".

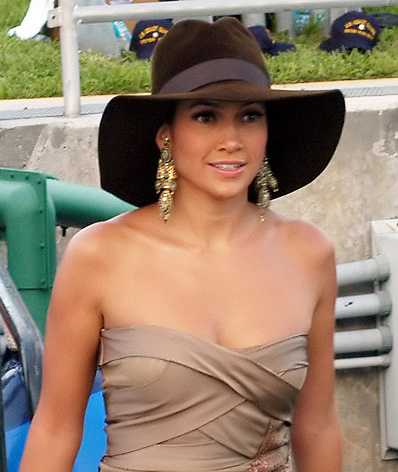
Jennifer Lopez's debut single "If You Had My Love" gave her six weeks at number one in August and September.

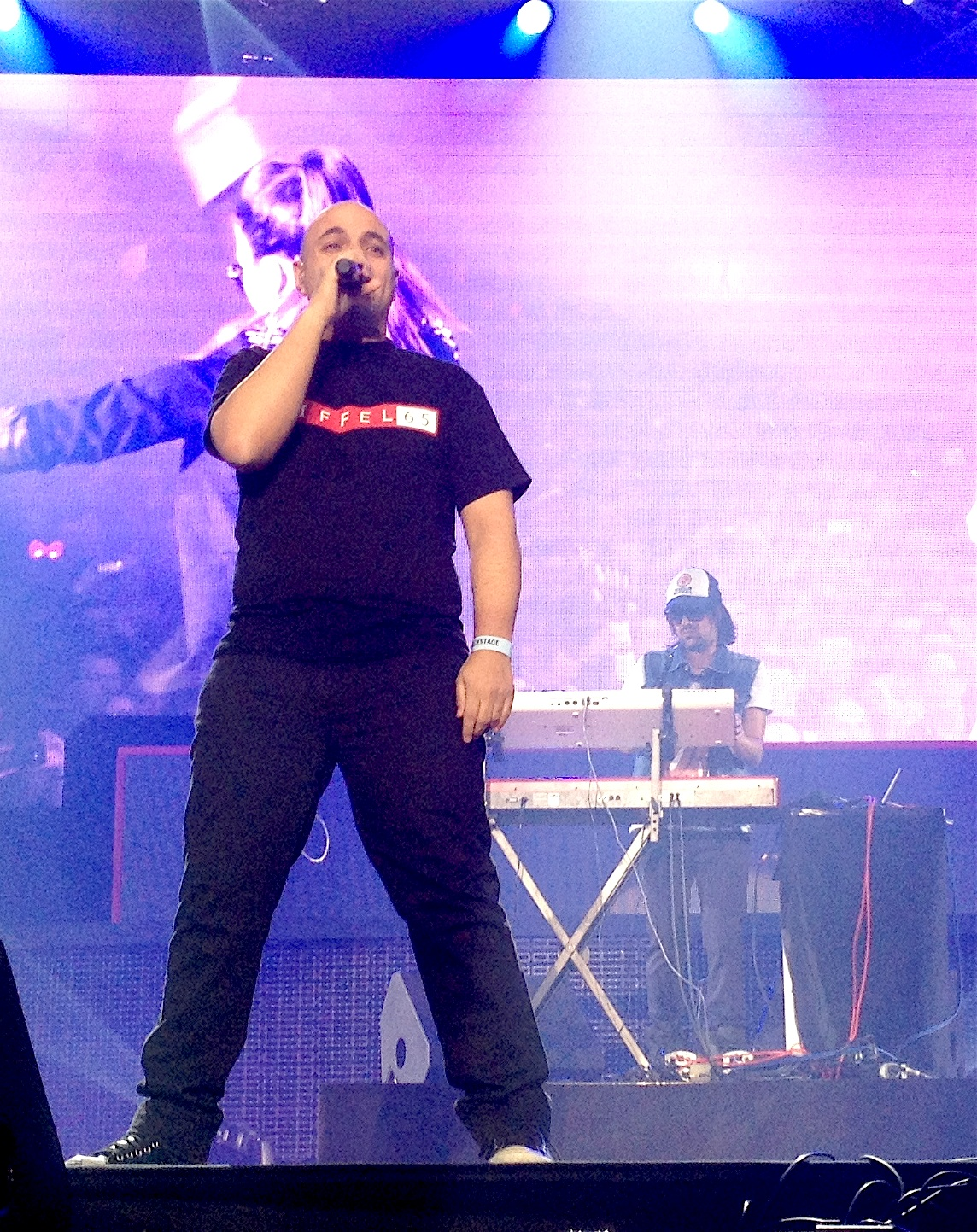
Italian musical group Eiffel 65 spent three weeks at number one in 1999 with "Blue (Da Ba Dee)".

Issue date	Song	Artist	Reference
4 January (Note: Due to a three-week break in publication over the 1998/1999 Christmas/New Year period, the week of 4 January is inferred.)	"Thank U"	Alanis Morissette	
11 January	"It's All Been Done"	Barenaked Ladies	
18 January (Note: No chart was published on 18 January, so a week's gap is inferred.)	"It's All Been Done"	Barenaked Ladies	
25 January	"Hands"	Jewel	
1 February	"You Get What You Give"	New Radicals	
8 February	"...Baby One More Time"	Britney Spears	
15 February	"Believe"	Cher	
22 February	"Believe"	Cher	
1 March	"Believe"	Cher	
8 March	"Every Morning"	Sugar Ray	
15 March	"Every Morning"	Sugar Ray	
22 March	"Every Morning"	Sugar Ray	
29 March	"Every Morning"	Sugar Ray	
5 April	"Every Morning"	Sugar Ray	
12 April	"Love Song"	Sky	
19 April	"Love Song"	Sky	
26 April	"No Scrubs"	TLC	
3 May	"No Scrubs"	TLC	
10 May	"Kiss Me"	Sixpence None the Richer	
17 May	"Kiss Me"	Sixpence None the Richer	
24 May	"Kiss Me"	Sixpence None the Richer	
31 May	"Livin' la Vida Loca"†	Ricky Martin	
7 June	"Livin' la Vida Loca"†	Ricky Martin	
14 June	"Livin' la Vida Loca"†	Ricky Martin	
21 June	"Livin' la Vida Loca"†	Ricky Martin	
28 June	"Livin' la Vida Loca"†	Ricky Martin	
5 July	"Livin' la Vida Loca"†	Ricky Martin	
12 July	"Livin' la Vida Loca"†	Ricky Martin	
19 July	"Livin' la Vida Loca"†	Ricky Martin	
26 July	"Beautiful Stranger"	Madonna	
2 August	"Beautiful Stranger"	Madonna	
9 August	"If You Had My Love"	Jennifer Lopez	
16 August	"If You Had My Love"	Jennifer Lopez	
23 August	"If You Had My Love"	Jennifer Lopez	
30 August	"If You Had My Love"	Jennifer Lopez	
6 September	"If You Had My Love"	Jennifer Lopez	
13 September	"If You Had My Love"	Jennifer Lopez	
20 September	"Mambo No. 5 (A Little Bit Of...)"	Lou Bega	
27 September	"Mambo No. 5 (A Little Bit Of...)"	Lou Bega	
4 October	"Mambo No. 5 (A Little Bit Of...)"	Lou Bega	
11 October	"Mambo No. 5 (A Little Bit Of...)"	Lou Bega	
18 October	"Mambo No. 5 (A Little Bit Of...)"	Lou Bega	
25 October	"Mambo No. 5 (A Little Bit Of...)"	Lou Bega	
1 November	"Mambo No. 5 (A Little Bit Of...)"	Lou Bega	
8 November	"Mambo No. 5 (A Little Bit Of...)"	Lou Bega	
15 November	"Mambo No. 5 (A Little Bit Of...)"	Lou Bega	
22 November	"Mambo No. 5 (A Little Bit Of...)"	Lou Bega	
29 November	"Mambo No. 5 (A Little Bit Of...)"	Lou Bega	
6 December	"Smooth"	Santana featuring Rob Thomas	
13 December	"Blue (Da Ba Dee)"	Eiffel 65	
20 December	"Blue (Da Ba Dee)"	Eiffel 65	
27 December (Note: Due to a two-week break in publication over the 1999/2000 Christmas/New Year period, the week of 27 December is inferred.)	"Blue (Da Ba Dee)"	Eiffel 65	

== See also ==
- 1999 in music
- Canadian number-one albums of 1999
- List of Billboard Hot 100 number ones of 1999 (United States)
- List of number-one singles from the 1990s (New Zealand)
