= Livin' la Vida Loca =

1999 single by Ricky Martin

Single by Ricky Martin

from the album Ricky Martin
- English title: "Livin' the Crazy Life"
- Released: March 23, 1999
- Studio: Record Plant (Los Angeles, California); The Hit Factory, Sony Music (New York City); Crescent Moon Studios (Miami, Florida)
- Genre: Latin pop; dance
- Length: 3:42
- Label: Columbia
- Songwriters: Draco Rosa; Desmond Child
- Producer: Desmond Child

Ricky Martin singles chronology
"Casi un Bolero" (1998)	"Livin' la Vida Loca" (1999)	"She's All I Ever Had" (1999)

Music video
- "Livin' la Vida Loca" on YouTube "Livin' la Vida Loca" (Spanish) on YouTube

Audio sample
- file; help

"Livin' la Vida Loca" (transl. "Livin' the Crazy Life") is a song recorded by Puerto Rican singer Ricky Martin for his fifth studio album and English-language debut, Ricky Martin (1999). The song was written by Draco Rosa and Desmond Child, while the production was handled by the latter. It was released to radio stations by Columbia Records as the lead single from the album on March 23, 1999. A Latin pop and dance song with elements of salsa, surf, and ska, it is about an irresistible, particularly sinister, wild woman who lives on the edge, seducing others into her crazy world. The song received acclaim from music critics, who complimented its lyrics and danceable rhythm. It was ranked as the best 1990s pop song by Elle, and was listed among the Best Latin Songs of All Time by Billboard.

"Livin' la Vida Loca" was commercially successful, reaching number one in more than 20 countries. It is considered to be Martin's biggest hit and one of the best-selling singles of all time. In the United States, it topped the Billboard Hot 100 chart for five consecutive weeks, becoming Martin's first number-one single on the chart. Additionally, it broke several records on Billboard charts. It spent eight consecutive weeks atop the Canada's RPM 100 Hit Tracks chart and topped the country's year-end chart. In the United Kingdom, it debuted at number one and stayed there for three weeks, making Martin the first Puerto Rican artist in history to hit number one. It has received several certifications, including double platinum in the UK. The track was nominated for Record of the Year, Song of the Year, Best Male Pop Vocal Performance, and Best Instrumental Arrangement Accompanying Vocalist(s) at the 42nd Annual Grammy Awards.

The accompanying music video was directed by American director Wayne Isham and filmed in Los Angeles, California. It received a number of awards and nominations. At the 1999 MTV Video Music Awards, it won a total of five awards and was nominated for several other categories, including Video of the Year, making Martin the first Latin artist in history to receive a nomination in this category. A Spanish-language version of "Livin' la Vida Loca" was recorded under the same title and reached the summit of the Billboard Hot Latin Tracks chart in the United States. To promote the original version of the song, Martin performed it on many television programs and award shows, including the MTV Video Music Awards and the World Music Awards in 1999. Many bands and singers covered the song, and it has been featured in several films and video games.

== Background and release ==
On October 22, 1998, CNN confirmed that Martin had started working on his first English language album, following the success of Vuelve. In February 1999, Ricky Martin performed his smash hit "The Cup of Life" at the 41st Annual Grammy Awards, which was greeted with a massive standing ovation and met with acclaim from music critics. On March 6, 1999, almost two weeks after his Grammy performance, Billboard revealed the lead single's name as "Livin' la Vida Loca" in an article and mentioned that it is set for release later that month. Martin wrote about the recording of the song in his book:

I would go so far as to say that during the process of recording the song we actually made magic. For "Livin' la Vida Loca" I had the good fortune of working once again with Draco Rosa and Desmond Child. Although I had made several records, I quickly realized that working with Desmond Child is working at an entirely new level.

In 2018, during an interview with Attitude, Martin told the magazine that the release of the song was not decided until he started working on "Be Careful (Cuidado Con Mi Corazón)" with Madonna: "This album was almost going to be released without 'Livin' la Vida Loca', but three days before I walked into the studio with Madonna, we were done with 'Livin' La Vida Loca', so I showed her what I was presenting – and she was like, 'Yep! I'm ready to go into the studio with you!"

Columbia Records released "Livin' la Vida Loca" to radio stations on March 23, 1999, as the lead single from the album. Afterwards, standard-length commercial formats were released in the United States on April 20, 1999. It was included as the first track on Martin's fifth studio album Ricky Martin, released May 11, 1999, and the Spanish version was included as the eleventh track. On July 5, three remixes were released as a CD single in Germany, Italy, Spain, and the United Kingdom.

== Music and lyrics ==
Musically, "Livin' la Vida Loca" is a Latin pop and dance song with elements of salsa, surf, and ska, that features Latin percussion rhythms and horn riffs mixed with surf rock-inspired guitar riffs. Suzy Exposito from Rolling Stone described the track as "salsa-rock fusion", and Marc Oxoby described it as an "energetic dance single" in his book, The 1990s. Larry Flick from Billboard named it a "rock-etched uptempo tune". During an interview with Digital Spy, Martin said that he has reworked the song several times for concerts, changing it "from heavy hardcore rock to being exclusively influenced by ska and it's been urban as well!" According to the sheet music published by Alfred Publishing on Musicnotes.com, "Livin' la Vida Loca" is composed in the key of C♯ minor with a groove of 140 beats per minute. Martin's vocals span from the low note of C♯ to the high note of G♯_{4}. The construction includes a syncopated brass intro and a Spanish chorus.

"Livin' la Vida Loca" was written by American musicians Draco Rosa and Desmond Child, with its production being handled by Desmond Child. Spanish songwriter Luis Gómez-Escolar joined the original version's lyricists to write the Spanish version. The original version of the song runs for a total of 4 minutes and 3 seconds, and was recorded without using then-conventional recording studio equipment; instead, the track was created at Desmond Child's Gentlemen's Club Studio, which uses a 169-track Pro Tools digital system. The recording uses dynamic range compression to increase the track's perceived loudness. Lyrically, "Livin' la Vida Loca", which translates to "Livin' the Crazy Life" in English, is about an irresistible, particularly sinister wild woman who lives on the edge, seducing others into her crazy world, with lyrics including, "Upside, inside out / She's livin' la vida loca / She'll push and pull you down / Livin' la vida loca". Throughout the song, Martin sings about an evil seductress, who makes him go "dancing in the rain", and leaves him broke and alone in a "funky cheap hotel".

== Critical reception ==
Professional ratings
Review scores
Source	Rating
AllMusic	4/5 stars

"Livin' la Vida Loca" has been met with positive reviews from music critics. Chuck Taylor from Billboard applauded the song, saying it is "so electrifying, so terrifically filled with life, that even folks at the retirement home down the street could get their groove on with couple spins", and described the song as a "frantically-paced, dance-ready track." From the same magazine, Leila Cobo ranked it as the best track of Ricky Martin (1999), calling it "Awesome". She questions, "Was there a person alive in 1999 whose jaw literally did not drop when they saw Ricky Martin strut and swivel in the video to the song whose title would come to exemplify an era and a lifestyle?" In another article, she labeled it "an irresistible invitation to dance". Harley Brown added, "No matter what language it was in, 'La Vida Loca' was a bona fide hit." In addition, Billboard staff praised the single, saying: "The big horns, the seductive bass, the debauchery in the lyrics, and Ricky Martin shaking his bon-bon: how could anyone resist this late '90s anthem penned by Robi Draco Rosa and Desmond Child?"

Multiple sources have named "Livin' la Vida Loca" a "mega-hit", including The Hollywood Reporter, Rolling Stone, Billboard, Los Angeles Times, and Entertainment Tonight. Liz Calvario‍ from Entertainment Tonight complimented the track, saying it is "part of pop culture history". Martin was featured on the cover of Interview magazine in June 1999 because of the popularity of the song. In the featured article, he was interviewed by his friend Gloria Estefan about the rising wave of Latin music. Agustin Gurza from Los Angeles Times celebrated the song, labeling it "a sensual smash hit that came to symbolize the frenzied cultural breakthrough of a long-marginalized minority". Writing for LiveAbout.com, Bill Lamb gave the song a positive review, saying: "It's irresistibly sexy and nearly impossible to listen to without moving the body." Both Katherine Keenan and Noa Amouyal from The Jerusalem Post described "Livin' la Vida Loca" as catchy, while the latter said it "was truly inescapable as the century drew to a close". An author of ABC labeled the track "an unprecedented classic" and named it Martin's "most characteristic song".

In her review for O, The Oprah Magazine, Amanda Mitchell ranked the track as Martin's second-best song on her 2019 list. In 2020, MTV Argentina ranked it as one of Martin's best songs, and Luca Mastinu from Optimagazine listed it as one of Martin's five greatest hits. Brittany Berkowitz and Elisa Tang from Good Morning America described "Livin' la Vida Loca" as an "epic dance song", and Katrina Rees from CelebMix described it as infinitely infectious. Metro Weekly's Randy Shulman complimented the track, labeling it "a song with an infectious hook and a sexy, growling delivery". Alejandra Torres from ¡Hola! named its chorus "the greatest chorus of all time". Rafly G. from TheThings called the song "an iconic piece of art". Greg Kot from Chicago Tribune described it as "the year's most ubiquitous hit single" and wrote: "It's the kind of tune that defines the word 'pop': a jolt of instant caffeine, with its fizzy combination of surf guitar, Latin percussion and strutting horns." He acclaimed its "canny, genre-leaping arrangement, eye-popping production, and Latin-lover lyrics".

== Accolades ==
Elle hailed "Livin' la Vida Loca" as the best '90s pop song. In Women's Health, the song placed at number 45 on their decade-end list. VH1 ranked it at number 28 on their "Greatest Songs of the '90s" list, while Cosmopolitan ranked it at number 36 on their decade-end list. LiveAbout named it the 18th best song of the decade and the fourth pop song of 1999. Latina ranked the single as the third-best Latin-infused song from the 90s. In GQ the track placed at number eight on their "Best Songs of 1999" list. Billboard and Rolling Stone ranked the song at number 13 and 51 respectively on their year-end lists. It was ranked at number 9 on uDiscoverMusic's "25 Songs That Defined The Millennium" list. In The Ringer, the song was placed in the 40th position on their year-end list. Bruce Pollock placed it on an unranked list of the 7500 most important songs of 1944–2000, and Plain Dealer ranked it as the 42nd best No. 1 song of the 1990s. In 2020, Entertainment Tonight Canada named it the 14th Happiest Song of All Time, and Billboard ranked it at number 30 on their "Best Latin Songs of All Time" list. From the same magazine, Leila Cobo placed it on an unranked list of "10 Essential Latin Dance Songs" in 2016. In 2019, LiveAbout ranked "Livin' la Vida Loca" as the fourth top Latin pop song of all time. The song was voted the top dance track of all time by VH1 viewers. In 2023, Billboard ranked it as the 180th Best Pop Song of All Time.

"Livin' la Vida Loca" was nominated for Record of the Year, Song of the Year, Best Male Pop Vocal Performance, and Best Instrumental Arrangement Accompanying Vocalist(s) at the 42nd Annual Grammy Awards, marking Martin's first acknowledgment in one of the four "General Field" categories. Thus, he became the only mainstream Latin act, who had achieved global success and had major Grammy impact in 2000. The Spanish version was nominated for Record of the Year at the 2000 Latin Grammy Awards. As of 2017, "Livin' la Vida Loca" and "Despacito" are the only songs to be nominated for Record of the Year in both Grammy Awards and Latin Grammy Awards. The song won the award for Pop Song of the Year at the 2000 Lo Nuestro Awards, and Latin Pop Track of the Year at the 2000 Latin Billboard Music Awards, both for the second year in a row. It received a respective nomination for Hot Latin Track of the Year at the Latin Billboard Music Awards. "Livin' la Vida Loca" was honored as Song of the Year and was recognized as one of the most performed songs, both in Pop/Ballad category at the 2000 ASCAP Awards. The track won Pop/Ballad Song of the Year at the 1999 Premios Globo awards. It was listed as Song of the Year at the 2000 BMI Latin Awards, and at the 15th Annual International Dance Music Awards, presented in 2000, the single won the award for Best Latin 12". "Livin 'la Vida Loca" won the Best Song award at the 2001 Music Television Awards. The song received a nomination for Best Re-Mix at the 2004 Premios Juventud. In 2022, "Livin' la Vida Loca" was selected by the Library of Congress among the recordings being inducted into the National Recording Registry, as "important contributions to American culture and history".

== Commercial performance ==
Internationally, "Livin' la Vida Loca" topped the charts in more than 20 countries and is considered to be Martin's biggest hit, and one of the best-selling singles of all time. In the United States, the single debuted at number 54 on the Billboard Hot 100 on April 17, 1999, becoming Martin's third entry. The following week it climbed to number 32, and in its third week, it became Martin's first top 10 in the country. In its fourth week, it reached number one and remained at the top for five consecutive weeks, making Martin the first solo male artist in over a year to capture the top spot and achieve the first number one hit for his label, Columbia. "Livin' la Vida Loca" became the first number-one song made entirely in Pro Tools. It finished 1999 as the year's number ten Billboard Hot 100 song and the decade's 38th top song. The song reached number one on the US Maxi-Singles Sales, Mainstream Top 40, Adult Top 40, Rhythmic Top 40, and Top 40 Tracks charts. Thus, it became the first song in history to top Billboard's Adult Top 40, Mainstream Top 40, and Rhythmic Top 40 charts, holding its record as the only song to do so for 14 years. On the US Dance Club Play chart, it peaked at number five, becoming Martin's first top 10.

The song was certified platinum by the Recording Industry Association of America (RIAA), denoting shipments of over one million copies. As of February 2000, the song has sold over 1.2 million physical copies in the United States, according to Nielsen SoundScan, and although it was released years before the digital era, it has sold over 502,000 digital copies in the United States, as of January 2011. The Spanish version debuted at number two on Billboard's Hot Latin Tracks chart on April 17, 1999, and reached number one the following week, becoming Martin's third number one. It remained at the top for nine weeks. On May 15, 1999, it became the first single ever to top four different Billboard charts and made Martin the first act to simultaneously scale a pop, Latin, and dance chart. Two weeks later, he became the first artist to simultaneously top the Billboard 200, Hot Latin Tracks, Hot Dance Music/Club Play, Hot Dance Music/Maxi-Singles Sales, Top 40 Tracks, and the Billboard Hot 100.

In November 1999, it was labeled as one of the "hottest tracks" for Sony Discos in a list including the most successful songs released by the label since the launching of the Billboard Hot Latin Tracks chart in 1986. In January 2010, almost 11 years after the song's release, Billboard introduced a US Latin Digital Song Sales chart and "Livin' la Vida Loca" debuted at number 15 on January 23, 2010, before reaching a peak of number two on September 3, 2011. The song has since become Martin's longest-charting hit, spending 357 weeks on the chart.

"Livin' la Vida Loca" spent eight consecutive weeks atop Canada's RPM 100 Hit Tracks chart and topped the country's year-end chart. In the United Kingdom, it debuted at number one and stayed there for three weeks, making Martin the first Puerto Rican artist in history to hit number one. As of May 2017, Martin and Luis Fonsi are the only Puerto Rican singers to reach number one in the UK. Later in 1999, the song was certified platinum by the British Phonographic Industry (BPI), denoting sales of over 600,000 physical copies. It sold a total of 776,000 copies in the country that year, becoming the sixth best-selling song of 1999. In March 2021, the track was certified double platinum by the British Phonographic Industry (BPI) for additional track-equivalent sales of 1.2 million digital units since 2011. In Australia, it peaked at number four and was certified double platinum by the Australian Recording Industry Association (ARIA), denoting shipments of over 140,000 copies. The song reached number one in Argentina, Chile, Costa Rica, El Salvador, Greece, Guatemala, Hungary, Ireland, Mexico, New Zealand, Nicaragua, Panama, Puerto Rico, and Saudi Arabia. Additionally, it peaked in the top 10 of numerous countries, including France, Germany, Italy, Spain, Sweden, and Switzerland. In Romania, "Livin' la Vida Loca" was listed as the most-played song of the year.

== Music video ==
=== Development and synopsis ===
A screenshot from the music video, depicting Martin performing in a nightclub.

The accompanying music video was filmed in Los Angeles, California, and directed by American director Wayne Isham, who had directed the videos for Martin's previous singles "Vuelve", "The Cup of Life", and "La Bomba". The video cost US$500,000 making it one of the most expensive music videos ever made. The visual was aired on March 25, 1999, on MTV, and begins with a scene, showing a car hitting a fire hydrant on the sidewalk. Then, Martin is seen wearing a black shirt and pants, walking on stage in a nightclub and performing the song and dancing to it, backed by his band, playing horns, while a group of dancers and party-ready crowd are dancing to the song.

At night, a young wild woman, portrayed by Croatian model Nina Morić, sits next to Martin, as he drives a car. She lives the ultimate crazy life and drives him crazy too, and shimmies and dances nearby. Lying on a pale brown blanket, he wakes up in a cheap New York City motel, and the woman grabs his hand from the window and brings him out. They flirt and kiss, while they walk on the sidewalk, and then Martin takes his jacket off and they kiss while dancing in the rain. In one of the later scenes, Martin is distracted while driving causing him to veer in another lane, resulting in another car knocking out a fire hydrant. Several women take their clothes off and dance in the rain, which is similar to the lyrics of the song. The video ends with Martin's performance on the stage.

=== Reception ===
TheThings ranked "Livin' la Vida Loca" as the 10th most iconic pop music video from the 1990s. Leila Cobo from Billboard gave the video a positive review, saying: "From the moment he sashayed up to the mic in 'Livin La Vida Loca' all dressed in black, and gave us that look, the Menudo alum became the most memorable and watchable drop-dead handsome guy in pop music." Also from Billboard, Larry Flick described it as "high-tech" and "ultra-sexy", mentioning the fact that it had "gotten strong attention from video out-lets like MTV and VH1". Cristal Mesa from mitú named it Martin's best music video on her 2018 list, and an author of Cultura Colectiva listed "Livin' la Vida Loca" among the "13 Videos to Appreciate Ricky Martin's Talent and Sickening Good Looks". The music video has received a number of awards and nominations. At the 1999 MTV Video Music Awards, it was nominated for several categories, including Video of the Year, making Martin the first Latin artist in history to receive a nomination in this category. It won two primary awards for Best Pop Video and Best Dance Video, and was voted three additional awards in the International Viewer's Choice categories, making it rank among the videos with most wins in the history of the MTV Video Music Awards. Since then, Martin has become the most awarded Latin artist of all time in the ceremony.

Awards and nominations for "Livin' la Vida Loca" music video
Organization	Year	Award	Result	Ref.
Billboard Music Video Awards	1999	Maximum Vision Award	Nominated	
Billboard Music Video Awards	1999	Best New Artist Clip – Dance	Nominated	
MTV Video Music Awards	1999	Video of the Year	Nominated	
MTV Video Music Awards	1999	Best Male Video	Nominated	
MTV Video Music Awards	1999	Best Dance Video	Won	
MTV Video Music Awards	1999	Best Pop Video	Won	
MTV Video Music Awards	1999	Best Choreography	Nominated	
MTV Video Music Awards	1999	Viewer's Choice	Nominated	
MTV Video Music Awards	1999	International Viewer's Choice Award – Latin America (North)	Won	
MTV Video Music Awards	1999	International Viewer's Choice Award – Latin America (South)	Won	
MTV Video Music Awards	1999	International Viewer's Choice Award – Russia	Won	
Ritmo Latino Music Awards	1999	Music Video of the Year	Won	
VH1/Vogue Fashion Awards	1999	Most Stylish Video	Nominated	
ALMA Awards	2000	Outstanding Music Video Performers	Won	
MVPA Awards	2000	Best Choreography	Won	
MVPA Awards	2000	Best Styling	Won	

For unknown reasons, the music video for the song on YouTube is still blocked in Germany as of June 2026.

== Live performances ==
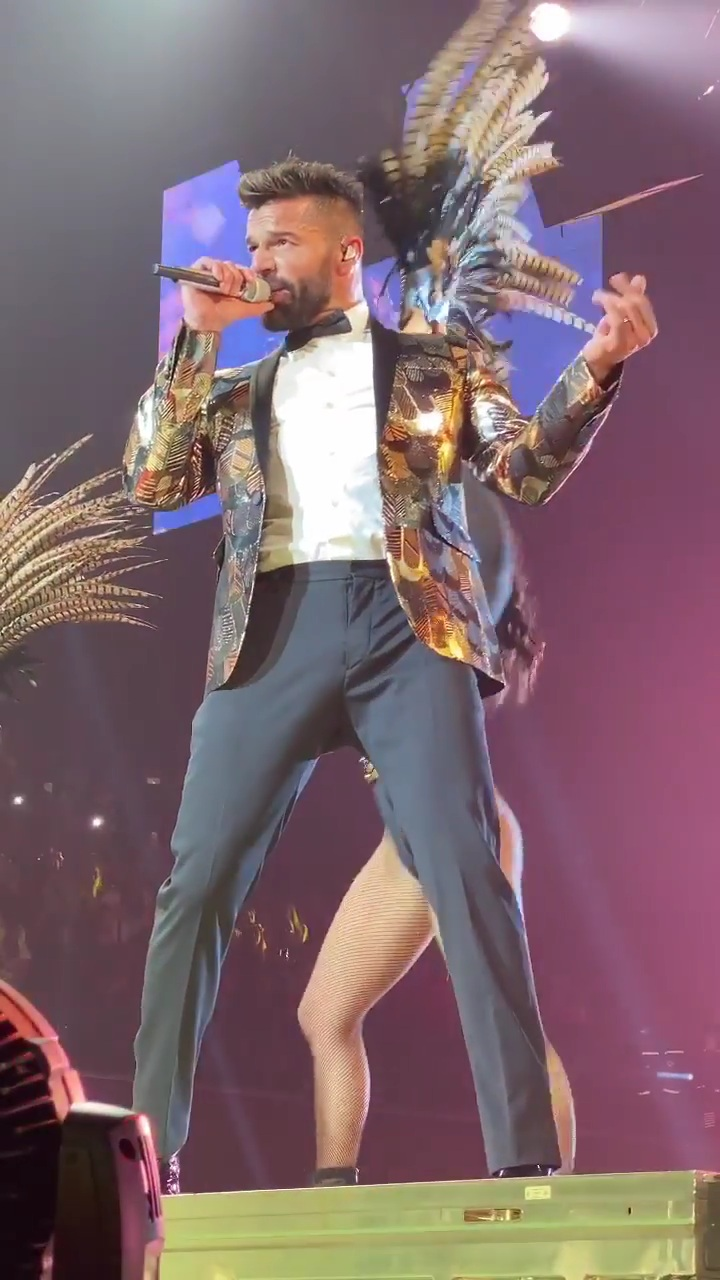
Martin performing "Livin' la Vida Loca" on his Movimiento Tour in 2020.

Martin gave his first live performance of "Livin' la Vida Loca" at the 11th Annual World Music Awards on May 5, 1999. Three and six days later, he performed it on Saturday Night Live and The Rosie O'Donnell Show. Two weeks later, he performed it at the 1999 Blockbuster Entertainment Awards, and the following day, he performed it on The Tonight Show with Jay Leno. On May 29, 1999, he performed "Livin' la Vida Loca" and "The Cup of Life" on Bingolotto TV Show. Martin delivered a performance of "Livin' la Vida Loca" on the BBC's Top of the Pops on August 6, 1999. At the 1999 MTV Video Music Awards, he performed "She's All I Ever Had" and "Livin' la Vida Loca", accompanied by a group of impressive women dressed in glitter. Maria G. Valdez from Latin Times ranked his rendition as the sixth performance by a Latin artist at the MTV Video Music Awards, saying: "At the beginning we thought it was going to be a mystic performance, slow and focused on the vocals, but eventually it became a party and you definitely gotta see some of Ricky's best moves on full display during that performance." Wonderwall.com editors picked his performance as one of their favorite moments from MTV VMAs until 2020.

"Livin' la Vida Loca" was included on the set lists for Martin's the Livin' la Vida Loca Tour, the One Night Only with Ricky Martin tour, the Black and White Tour, the Música + Alma + Sexo World Tour, the Ricky Martin Live tour, the Live in Mexico tour, the One World Tour, the All In residency, the Ricky Martin en Concierto, the Movimiento Tour, and the Enrique Iglesias and Ricky Martin Live in Concert tour. Martin's performance of the song in Puerto Rico during the Black and White Tour was included on the live album Ricky Martin... Live Black & White Tour (2007). Martin performed the track along with his other hits during the 48th, 55th, and 61st editions of the Viña del Mar International Song Festival in 2007, 2014, and 2020, respectively. In October 2015, American singer-songwriter Taylor Swift invited Martin as a surprise guest to her The 1989 World Tour in Miami, and the two performed the song together. She teased the crowd before bringing him out, saying: "I'm about to bring out somebody whose album I bought when I was 10. When he came out, he paved the way for so many incredible Latin artists to cross over to pop and become huge and make amazing music. He's such an inspiring person, I'm so lucky to have him here tonight."

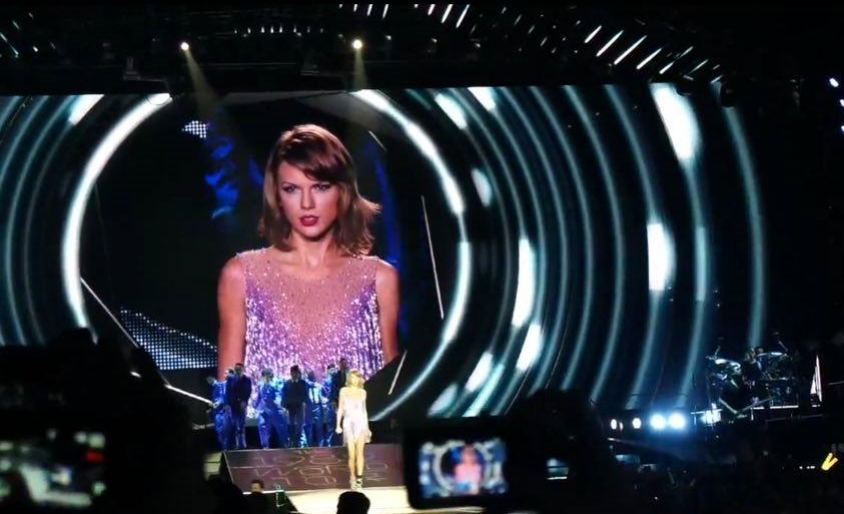
Taylor Swift (pictured) invited Martin as a surprise guest to her The 1989 World Tour, and the two performed "Livin' la Vida Loca" together.

On season two of The Voice Australia in 2013, Martin and other coaches performed the song together. On February 10, 2015, he performed "Adiós", "Disparo al Corazón" and "Livin' la Vida Loca" on the Honda Stage at the iHeartRadio Theater. Two days later, he performed "Adiós", "Livin' la Vida Loca" and "The Cup of Life" on The Today Show. He performed "Livin' la Vida Loca", "She Bangs" and "Adrenalina" with the show's finalists, and "La Copa de la Vida" with Cristina Scuccia on season two of The Voice of Italy in 2014. On May 13, 2015, he performed "Mr. Put It Down", "Livin' la Vida Loca", "She Bangs", and "The Cup of Life" alongside Clark Beckham, Nick Fradiani, Quentin Alexander, Qaasim Middleton, and Rayvon Owen on the fourteenth season's finale of American Idol. On November 15, 2016, Martin performed a medley of "Mr. Put It Down", "Livin' La Vida Loca", "Shake Your Bon-Bon" and "La Mordidita" on The Ellen DeGeneres Show.

== Cover versions and appearances in media ==
Many bands and singers have recorded their own cover version of the song, and it has been parodied several times. On the same evening that Martin was Saturday Night Live's musical guest in May 1999, American comedian and SNL cast member Jimmy Fallon parodied an acoustic version of his song under the title "Livin' la Vida Yoda" as an ode to the fictional character in the Star Wars universe. A live cover of "Livin' la Vida Loca" was performed as part of a reggaeton medley by Calle 13, Julio Voltio, La Sista, Randy, Héctor el Father during the Latin Recording Academy Person of the Year gala in 2006 where Martin was honored with the accolade. Concert footage of American heavy metal band Slipknot was edited with the audio of "Livin' La Vida Loca" in 2015 to create a mashup video, making Slipknot frontman Corey Taylor appear to be singing the song; the video went viral. Japanese singer Hiromi Go remade "Livin' la Vida Loca" in 1999 as "Goldfinger '99". The song became a hit in Japan and was covered itself by multiple Japanese artists, including Koda Kumi who recorded the song in 2019. On January 16, 2020, Cuban-born American singer Camila Cabello and English television host James Corden competed on The Late Late Show with James Corden in a singing battle to decide if music from 1999 or 2019 is better. Corden performed "Livin' la Vida Loca" and Cabello shimmied around the host while he performed the tune. Afterward, Cabello joked: "Okay, really impressive. Ricky Martin? OK boomer."

A screenshot from Shrek 2, depicting Donkey and Puss in Boots singing "Livin' la Vida Loca".

The 2000 album La Vida Mickey features re-make versions of Latin/pop songs with the voices of the Disney characters in the background singing along, and its title track, which is performed by Mark Lennon is a re-make of "Livin' la Vida Loca". A version of the "Livin' la Vida Loca" performed by Eddie Murphy and Antonio Banderas (Donkey and Puss in Boots voice roles) is played at the end of the 2004 American animated comedy film Shrek 2, which appears on its soundtrack. The Guardian described their performance as exuberant and as of April 2007, this cover version and Murphy's cover of "I'm a Believer" have sold over 3.6 million copies in the United States, according to Nielsen SoundScan. The original Martin song was included in the American live-action/animated adventure comedy film The SpongeBob Movie: Sponge on the Run (2020), the Mexican mystery thriller streaming television series Who Killed Sara? (2021), and the Ubisoft video games Just Dance 4 (2012) and Far Cry 6 (2021). A pop-punk version of the song was played in the action role-playing video game Gotham Knights (2022).

The song has been covered by many contestants on various music talent shows. Chico Slimani performed "Livin' la Vida Loca" on series two of The X Factor in 2005. Ray Quinn performed it on series three in 2006, Wagner on series seven in 2010, Stevi Ritchie on series 11 in 2014, and Matt Linnen on series 14 in 2017. In 2018, Luke Anthony covered the track on season seven of The Voice Australia, while his rendition failed to impress the audience. Princess La Tremenda and Kynnie Williams delivered a performance of the song on the third season of The Voice Brasil in 2014. Joey Fatone performed the song as "Rabbit" on the first season of the American television series The Masked Singer in 2019.

== Legacy and influence ==
"The singer's mega hit came out in 1999, and helped turn the late '90s into a Latin pop explosion."

— Entertainment Tonight's Liz Calvario in 2019.

Martin is regarded by the media as the "Original Latin Crossover King". Angie Romero from Billboard wrote: "If you look up 'crossover' in the dictionary, there should be a photo of Ricky shaking his bon bon and/or 'Livin' la Vida Loca'." Following his performance of "The Cup of Life" at the Grammys, and the success of "Livin' la Vida Loca" and Ricky Martin (1999), he opened the gates for many Latin artists such as Jennifer Lopez, Shakira, Christina Aguilera, Marc Anthony, Santana, and Enrique Iglesias who released their crossover albums and followed him onto the top of the charts. According to Entertainment Tonight, "Livin' la Vida Loca" paved the way for a large number of other Latin artists, and is "credited as the song that helped other Latin artists break through to English-speaking markets".

As believed by Spin, the song "lit the fuse for the Latin pop explosion of the '90s". Lucas Villa from Spin wrote about it: "When the world went loca for Ricky, he led the way for other Latin music superstars like Spain's Enrique Iglesias, Colombia's Shakira and Nuyoricans like Jennifer Lopez and Marc Anthony to make their marks beyond the Spanish-speaking crowds." He described Martin as "a trailblazer in globalizing Latinx culture" in his Grammy.com article. Also from Grammy.com, Ernesto Lechner described "Livin' la Vida Loca" as "the manifesto for all the fun-loving, tropically tinged Latin hit singles that followed", stating that Martin led "the Latin music explosion that took over the U.S. at the tail end of the '90s". According to The Independent, the single is "widely regarded as the song that began the first Latin pop explosion". People's Jason Sheeler credited it as the song that "led the way for the late-'90s so-called 'Latin explosion' that dominated pop music into the new century: Shakira, Enrique Iglesias, Marc Anthony, and Jennifer Lopez".

Leila Cobo named the track one of the genre's biggest singles of the past 50 years in his 2021 book Decoding "Despacito": An Oral History of Latin Music. She wrote about his impact in "Whenever, Wherever" chapter: "Ricky Martin's phenomenal success opened the door for a string of Latin artists who waved the flags of their heritage, but who sang in English." Additionally, she compared Martin's song with "Despacito" in one of her Billboard articles: "'Livin', like 'Despacito', became not just a global hit but a cultural phenomena that transcended all barriers of language and nationality." In another article, she described it as the song that "ignited the late-'90s Latin explosion". Also from Billboard, Gary Trust wrote: "The song helmed a Latin pop boom in the U.S., with Jenner Lopez, Marc Anthony and others crossing over, as well." Writing for LiveAbout.com, Bill Lamb credited the song as "the record which kicked off a wave of major Latin performers hitting the pop mainstream". During an interview with mitú in 2021, Colombian singer-songwriter Maluma told the channel about Latin Music globalization: "This has been work that started with Ricky Martin's 'Livin' La Vida Loca' and Shakira like 15 or 20 years ago." Puerto Rican rapper and singer Wisin has described its music video as the video of another artist that has impacted him the most. Colombian singer-songwriter J Balvin referenced "Livin' la Vida Loca" on his song "Reggaetón" (2018) since Martin "gave as clear a depiction of his actualized artistic dreams".

== Formats and track listings ==
- Australian CD
1. "Livin' la Vida Loca" – 4:05
2. "Livin' la Vida Loca" (Spanish Version) – 4:05
3. "Livin' la Vida Loca" (Spanglish Version) – 4:05
- European CD maxi-single 1
1. "Livin' la Vida Loca" – 4:03
2. "Livin' la Vida Loca" (Pablo Flores English Club Mix) – 10:04
3. "Livin' la Vida Loca" (Scissorhands English Radio Mix) – 3:43
4. "Livin' la Vida Loca" (Pablo Flores Spanish Radio Edit) – 4:08
- European CD maxi-single 2
1. "Livin' la Vida Loca" (Pablo Flores English Radio Edit) – 4:07
2. "Livin' la Vida Loca" (Pablo Flores English Club Mix) – 10:04
3. "Livin' la Vida Loca" (Scissorhands English Radio Mix) – 3:43
4. "Livin' la Vida Loca" (Pablo Flores Spanish Radio Edit) – 4:08
- Japanese CD maxi-single
1. "Livin' la Vida Loca" (Album Version) – 4:03
2. "Livin' la Vida Loca" (Scissorhands Push & Pull English House Mix) – 7:09
3. "Livin' la Vida Loca" (Track Masters Remix) – 3:46
4. "Livin' la Vida Loca" (Pablo Flores English Club Mix) – 10:05
5. "Livin' la Vida Loca" (Pablo Flores English Radio Edit) – 4:08
- UK CD 1
1. "Livin' la Vida Loca" – 4:03
2. "La Copa de la Vida" (Spanglish Version – Radio Version) – 4:35
3. "Livin' la Vida Loca" (Joey Musaphia's Deep Vocal Edit) – 6:45
- UK CD 2
1. "Livin' la Vida Loca" – 3:42
2. "Livin' la Vida Loca" (Amen Eurostamp Mix) – 7:18
3. "Livin' la Vida Loca" (Joey Musaphia's Carnival Mix) – 8:48
- US CD
1. "Livin' la Vida Loca" (Album Version) – 4:03
2. "Livin' la Vida Loca" (Spanish Version) – 4:03
- US CD maxi-single
1. "Livin' la Vida Loca" (Album Version) – 4:03
2. "Livin' la Vida Loca" (Scissorhands Push & Pull English House Mix) – 7:09
3. "Livin' la Vida Loca" (Track Masters Remix) – 3:46
4. "Livin' la Vida Loca" (Pablo Flores English Radio Edit) – 4:07
5. "Livin' la Vida Loca" (Pablo Flores Spanish Dub-apella) – 7:51

== Credits and personnel ==
Credits are adapted from Tidal and the US maxi-CD single liner notes.

Studio locations

- Engineered at Record Plant (Los Angeles, California)
- Mixed at The Hit Factory (New York City) and Crescent Moon Studios (Miami, Florida)
- Mastered At Sony Music Studios (New York City)

Personnel

- Ricky Martin – vocal, associated performer
- Robi Rosa – composer, lyricist, acoustic guitar, background vocal, co-producer
- Desmond Child – composer, lyricist, producer, executive producer
- Luis Gómez-Escolar – additional composer, lyricist for the Spanish version
- Randy Cantor – arranger, keyboards, programmer
- Nathan Malki – assistant engineer, recording engineer
- Germán Ortiz – assistant engineer
- Craig Lozowick – assistant engineer, recording engineer
- Iris Aponte – coordinator
- Brian Coleman – coordinator
- Tony Conceoción – flugelhorn, trumpet
- Rusty Anderson – guitar
- Ted Jensen – mastering engineer
- Charles Dye – mixing engineer, recording engineer
- Rafael Solano – percussion

== Charts ==
=== Weekly charts ===
Weekly peak performance for "Livin' la Vida Loca"
Chart (1999)	Peak position
Argentina (CAPIF)	1
Australia (ARIA)	4
Austria (Ö3 Austria Top 40)	7
Belgium (Ultratop 50 Flanders)	6
Belgium (Ultratop 50 Wallonia)	6
Canada (Nielsen SoundScan)	1
Canada Top Singles (RPM)	1
Canada Adult Contemporary (RPM)	1
Canada Dance/Urban (RPM)	1
Chile (Notimex)	1
Costa Rica (Notimex)	1
Czech Republic (IFPI)	2
El Salvador (Notimex)	1
Europe (Eurochart Hot 100)	4
Finland (Suomen virallinen lista)	5
France (SNEP)	7
Germany (GfK)	6
Greece (IFPI)	1
Guatemala (Notimex)	1
Honduras (Notimex)	2
Hungary (MAHASZ)	1
Iceland (Íslenski Listinn Topp 40)	6
Ireland (IRMA)	1
Italy (FIMI)	4
Italy Airplay (Music & Media)	4
Japan (Oricon)	56
Mexico (AMPROFON)	1
Netherlands (Dutch Top 40)	9
Netherlands (Single Top 100)	11
New Zealand (Recorded Music NZ)	1
Nicaragua (Notimex)	1
Norway (VG-lista)	2
Panama (Notimex)	1
Puerto Rico (Notimex)	1
Saudi Arabia (Notimex)	1
Scottish Singles Sales (Official Charts)	2
Spain (Promusicae)	2
Sweden (Sverigetopplistan)	4
Switzerland (Schweizer Hitparade)	3
UK Singles (Official Charts)	1
US Billboard Hot 100	1
US Adult Contemporary (Billboard)	18
US Adult Pop Airplay (Billboard)	1
US Dance Club Songs (Billboard)	5
US Dance Singles Sales (Billboard)	1
US Hot Latin Songs (Billboard)	1
US Pop Airplay (Billboard)	1
US Rhythmic Airplay (Billboard)	1
US Top 40 Tracks (Billboard)	1
US Tropical Airplay (Billboard)	2

Weekly peak performance for "Livin' la Vida Loca"
Chart (2008)	Position
Italy (FIMI)	13
Chart (2010–2022)	Position
US Latin Digital Song Sales (Billboard)	2
Chart (2023)	Position
Poland (Polish Airplay Top 100)	72
Chart (2025)	Position
Kazakhstan Airplay (TopHit)	95
Moldova Airplay (TopHit)	79

=== Year-end charts ===
1999 year-end chart performance for "Livin' la Vida Loca"
Chart (1999)	Position
Australia (ARIA)	21
Belgium (Ultratop 50 Flanders)	35
Belgium (Ultratop 50 Wallonia)	40
Brazil (Crowley)	68
Canada Top Singles (RPM)	1
Canada Adult Contemporary (RPM)	14
Europe (Eurochart Hot 100)	21
France (SNEP)	34
Germany (Media Control)	51
Netherlands (Dutch Top 40)	62
Netherlands (Single Top 100)	52
New Zealand (RIANZ)	14
Norway End of School Period (VG-lista)	3
Romania (Romanian Top 100)	1
Spain (AFYVE)	13
Sweden (Hitlistan)	12
Switzerland (Schweizer Hitparade)	18
UK Airplay Top 50 (Music Week)	13
UK Singles (OCC)	6
US Billboard Hot 100	10
US Adult Contemporary (Billboard)	46
US Adult Top 40 (Billboard)	14
US Hot Latin Tracks (Billboard)	5
US Mainstream Top 40 (Billboard)	9
US Maxi-Singles Sales (Billboard)	2
US Rhythmic Top 40 (Billboard)	18
US Top 40 Tracks (Billboard)	3

2010–2023 year-end chart performance for "Livin' la Vida Loca"
Chart (2010)	Position
US Latin Digital Song Sales (Billboard)	16
Chart (2011)	Position
US Latin Digital Song Sales (Billboard)	15
Chart (2012)	Position
US Latin Digital Song Sales (Billboard)	22
Chart (2013)	Position
US Latin Digital Song Sales (Billboard)	24
Chart (2014)	Position
US Latin Digital Song Sales (Billboard)	19
Chart (2015)	Position
US Latin Digital Song Sales (Billboard)	24
Chart (2016)	Position
US Latin Digital Song Sales (Billboard)	36
Chart (2017)	Position
US Latin Pop Digital Song Sales (Billboard)	20
Chart (2019)	Position
US Latin Pop Digital Song Sales (Billboard)	13
Chart (2021)	Position
US Latin Digital Song Sales (Billboard)	50
Chart (2023)	Position
Honduras Pop (Monitor Latino)	94

=== Decade-end charts ===
1990s decade-end chart performance for "Livin' la Vida Loca"
Chart (1990–1999)	Position
Canada (Nielsen SoundScan)	57
UK Singles (OCC)	51
US Billboard Hot 100	38

== Certifications and sales ==
Certifications and sales for "Livin' la Vida Loca"
Region	Certification	Certified units/sales
Australia (ARIA)	2× Platinum	140,000^{^}
Brazil (Pro-Música Brasil)	Gold	30,000^{‡}
Belgium (BRMA)	Gold	25,000^{*}
Denmark (IFPI Danmark)	Gold	45,000^{‡}
France (SNEP)	Gold	250,000^{*}
Germany (BVMI)	Gold	250,000^{^}
Italy	—	80,000
Italy (FIMI) since 2009	Gold	25,000^{‡}
New Zealand (RMNZ)	Platinum	30,000^{‡}
Norway (IFPI Norway)	Gold	
Spain (Promusicae)	Gold	30,000^{‡}
Sweden (GLF)	Gold	15,000^{^}
United Kingdom (BPI) Physical (1999 sales)	Platinum	776,000
United Kingdom (BPI) Digital (since 2011)	2× Platinum	1,200,000^{‡}
United States (RIAA) Physical	Platinum	1,200,000
United States Digital	—	502,000
^{*} Sales figures based on certification alone.^{^} Shipments figures based on certification alone.^{‡} Sales+streaming figures based on certification alone.

== Release history ==
Release dates and formats for "Livin' la Vida Loca"
Region	Date	Format(s)	Version	Label	Ref.
United States	April 6, 1999	Contemporary hit radio	Original	Columbia	
Australia	April 19, 1999	CD single	Original	Columbia	
Australia	April 19, 1999	CD maxi-single	Remixes	Columbia	
United States	April 20, 1999	7-inch vinyl; CD; cassette	Original	Columbia	
Japan	June 19, 1999	CD	Original	Epic	
United Kingdom	July 5, 1999	CD single	Original	Columbia	

== See also ==
- List of best-selling Latin singles
- Billboard Hot Latin Songs Year-End Chart
- List of Billboard Adult Top 40 number-one songs of the 1990s
- List of Billboard Hot 100 number-one singles of 1999
- List of Billboard Mainstream Top 40 number-one songs of the 1990s
- List of Billboard Rhythmic number-one songs of the 1990s
- List of number-one Billboard Hot Latin Tracks of 1999
- List of number-one Billboard Latin Pop Airplay songs of 1999
- List of number-one singles from the 1990s (New Zealand)
- List of number-one singles of 1999 (Canada)
- List of number-one singles of 1999 (Ireland)
- List of RPM number-one dance singles of 1999
- List of UK singles chart number ones of the 1990s
- List of Romanian Top 100 number ones
- RPM Year-End
