= She's All I Ever Had =

1999 single by Ricky Martin

Single by Ricky Martin

from the album Ricky Martin
- B-side: "Bella (She's All I Ever Had)"
- Released: June 15, 1999
- Studio: Crescent Moon Studios (Miami, Florida); Westlake Studios (West Hollywood, California); Sound Chamber Recorders (Modesto, California); The Hit Factory (New York City); Barking Doctor Recording (Mount Kisco, New York)
- Genre: Pop; rock
- Length: 4:52
- Label: Columbia
- Songwriters: George Noriega; Jon Secada; Draco Rosa
- Producers: Jon Secada; Walter Afanasieff; George Noriega

Ricky Martin singles chronology
"Livin' la Vida Loca" (1999)	"She's All I Ever Had" (1999)	"Shake Your Bon-Bon" (1999)

Music video
- "She's All I Ever Had" on YouTube "Bella" on YouTube

Audio sample
- file; help

Alternative cover
- Cover artwork used for "Bella" in Spain

"She's All I Ever Had" is a song recorded by Puerto Rican singer Ricky Martin for his fifth studio album and English-language debut, Ricky Martin (1999). The song was written by Jon Secada, Robi Rosa, and George Noriega, while the production was handled by Secada, Walter Afanasieff, and Noriega, with co-production from Rosa. It was released by Columbia Records as the second single from the album on June 15, 1999. A slow-tempo pop and rock ballad, it is a romantic love song, narrating the story of a man who misses his woman, while continuing to live and breathe for her. The song received widely positive reviews from music critics, who complimented the production and Martin's vocals. It was ranked as the third-best song from the Latin explosion of 1999 by Latina.

"She's All I Ever Had" was commercially successful, peaking at numbers two and three on the US Billboard Hot 100 and Canada Top Singles charts, respectively. A Spanish-language version of the song, entitled "Bella" (transl. "Beautiful"), which features additional lyrical contributions by Luis Gómez-Escolar, was recorded by Martin and reached the summit of both the Billboard Hot Latin Tracks and Latin Pop Songs charts in the United States. It also peaked at number one in Costa Rica, El Salvador, Guatemala, Mexico, and Panama. The version was nominated for Best Male Pop Vocal Performance at the 1st Annual Latin Grammy Awards. To promote the original version of the song, Martin performed it at the 1999 MTV Video Music Awards. The accompanying music video was directed by Nigel Dick and filmed in Los Angeles, California. It shows Martin as the ghost of a dead man visiting his lover.

== Background and release ==
In 1998, Ricky Martin released his fourth studio album Vuelve. The album experienced commercial success, spending 26 weeks atop the US Billboard Top Latin Albums chart. "La Copa de la Vida" was released as the second single from the album, and became the official song of the 1998 FIFA World Cup in France. The song topped the charts in more than 30 countries, and Martin performed it at the 41st Annual Grammy Awards, which was greeted with a massive standing ovation and met with acclaim from music critics. On October 22, 1998, CNN confirmed that Martin had started working on his first English language album, following the huge success of Vuelve. On March 6, 1999, almost two weeks after his Grammy performance, it was announced that the album, which was still untitled, had been set for release in May. "Livin' la Vida Loca" was released on March 23, 1999, as the lead single from the album. The song topped the charts in more than 20 countries and is considered to be Martin's biggest hit, and one of the best-selling singles of all time.

On April 24, 1999, Billboard revealed the album's title as Ricky Martin in an article, mentioning that it was initially set for retail on May 25, 1999. However, the huge interest in the disc encouraged Columbia Records to decide to rush the album to release two weeks ahead of schedule, on May 11. In the same issue, the magazine revealed that one of the tracks would be titled "She's All I Ever Had" and it would have a Spanish language version. Ricky Martin was released on the specified date and "She's All I Ever Had" was included as the third track on the album, while the Spanish version of the song, entitled "Bella" (transl. "Beautiful"), was included as the 13th track. Martin dedicated the latter to his grandmother who died a year earlier. "She's All I Ever Had" was released by Columbia Records as the second single from the album on June 15, 1999. Maxi singles were released in Australia, Japan, and Europe, on August 30, September 15, and October 11, 1999, respectively. The singles contain different versions of the song, including remixes by Puerto Rican DJ Pablo Flores.

== Music and lyrics ==
Musically, "She's All I Ever Had" is a slow-tempo pop and rock ballad, that "begins slowly with guitar accompaniment then soars in the chorus". The song was written by Jon Secada, Robi Rosa, and George Noriega, while the production was handled by Secada, Walter Afanasieff, and Noriega, with co-production from Rosa. Also, Spanish songwriter Luis Gómez-Escolar joined the English version's lyricists to write "Bella". According to both versions' sheet musics on Musicnotes.com, "She's All I Ever Had" and "Bella" are composed in the key of B major with a groove of 82 beats per minute. In the former, Martin's vocals span from the low note of B_{3} to the high note of E_{5}. In the latter, his vocals span from the low note of F_{3} to the high note of F_{5}. The English version runs for a total of 4 minutes and 55 seconds, while the Spanish version runs for a total of 4 minutes and 54 seconds. Lyrically, "She's All I Ever Had" is a romantic love song, narrating the story of a man who misses his woman, while he continues to live and breathe for her. The lyrics include, "It's the way she makes me feel / It's the only thing that's real / It's the way she understands / She's my lover, she's my friend / When I look into her eyes / It's the way I feel inside / Like the man I want to be / She's all I'll ever need."

== Critical reception ==
"She's All I Ever Had" has been met with widely positive reviews from music critics. Chuck Taylor from Billboard labeled the song "[a] delectable anthemic ballad" and said "there was no doubt that" it was the track "to go with as the second single" from the album. He added that the song "will do nothing but advance Martin's place not only as the leading pop male vocalist of the day but as a valid phenomenon", mentioning that it "absolutely succeeds on all levels". He complimented Martin's vocal for being "tender and heartfelt", and "boasting a versatility that contrasts nicely" with his previous single, "Livin' la Vida Loca", as well as the song's production, which he described as "lush", "savvy" and "creatively executed". Also from Billboard, Leila Cobo ranked the song as the second-best track from Ricky Martin, saying it "showcases the soulful, romantic Ricky and bears the melancholy stamp of Robi Rosa's writing". Celia San Miguel of Tidal Magazine gave "She's All I Ever Had" a positive review, saying it "left fans swooning over the charismatic heartthrob and his passionate and emotive vocals".

Bustle's Maggie Malach stated that "this ballad hit every in the feels", while The Indianapolis Star reviewer Diana Penner celebrated the song for being "suitable for slow-dancing and fantasizing". Another author of the newspaper noted the song's "dreamy pop guitar". Writing for Hollywood.com, Natalie Daniels named it a "major hit". Joey Guerra from the Houston Chronicle acknowledged "Bella" to be "superior" to "She's All I Ever Had". The News Journal critic Jena Montgomery described "Bella" as "somber" and "seductive". In his review for TV Overmind in 2018, Tom Foster ranked "She's All I Ever Had" as Martin's second-best song and stated that "despite the slight 80's feel of this song, you can still get into it since it's the perfect song for an anniversary, wedding, or just to show that you appreciate your significant other". Lamis Mohammad of Youm7 listed it as Martin's fourth-best song in 2019. In 2021, Claudia González Alvarado from Chilango ranked it as his ninth-best ballad.

=== Accolades ===
Latina ranked "She's All I Ever Had" as the third-best song from the Latin explosion of 1999. In 2015, Bustle placed the song at number 19 on a list titled "You Need To Listen To These '90s Songs Again". "Bella" was nominated for Best Male Pop Vocal Performance at the 1st Annual Latin Grammy Awards, but lost to "Tu Mirada" by Luis Miguel. It was also nominated for Latin Pop Track of the Year at the 2000 Latin Billboard Music Awards. The song was recognized as one of the most performed songs in the Pop/Ballad category at the 2000 ASCAP Latin Awards, as well as an award-winning song at the 2001 BMI Latin Awards. "She's All I Ever Had" was recognized as an award-winning song at the 2001 BMI Pop Awards.

== Commercial performance ==
"She's All I Ever Had" is one of Martin's most commercially successful songs in his career. In the United States, the single debuted at number 63 on the Billboard Hot 100 on August 7, 1999, becoming Martin's fourth entry. In its seventh week, the song became Martin's second top-five hit in the country, following his chart-topper "Livin' la Vida Loca". "She's All I Ever Had" subsequently peaked at number two on the chart on September 25, 1999. The song also peaked at numbers seven and four on Billboard's Hot 100 Airplay and Adult Contemporary charts, respectively. It spent 38 weeks on the latter chart, becoming Martin's first top-10 and his longest-charting hit to date. In October 1999, the track was certified platinum by the Recording Industry Association of America (RIAA), denoting shipments of over 500,000 copies in the United States. "Bella" debuted at number 20 on Billboard Hot Latin Tracks on the chart issue dated July 10, 1999. It subsequently reached number one on September 4, 1999, and stayed there for three consecutive weeks, giving Martin his fourth number-one hit on the chart. The track also peaked at numbers one and seven on Billboard Latin Pop Songs and Tropical/Salsa listings, respectively.

"She's All I Ever Had" peaked at number three on the Canada Top Singles chart, becoming Martin's second top-five hit in Canada, following his chart-topper "Livin' la Vida Loca". In Australia, "She's All I Ever Had" peaked at number 28 and was certified gold by the Australian Recording Industry Association (ARIA), denoting shipments of over 35,000 copies. In New Zealand, it peaked at number eight on the Official New Zealand Music Chart. The song reached number one in Croatia, as well as the top 10 in Finland and Iceland, and the top 20 in Germany and the Netherlands. "Bella" experienced commercial success in Latin American countries, reaching number one in Costa Rica, El Salvador, Guatemala, Mexico, and Panama. It also peaked at number two in Honduras, Nicaragua, and Puerto Rico, and number seven in Chile.

== Music videos ==
A screenshot from the music video, depicting Martin and Charlotte Ayanna as lovers hugging each other romantically in a flashback.

The accompanying music video was filmed at Boyle Ranch Chatsworth, Lovell House, and Raleigh Studios in Los Angeles, California, in June 1999 and was directed by British director Nigel Dick. The visual was aired on August 6, 1999, on MTV's Total Request Live.

Inspired by the American fantasy drama film What Dreams May Come (1998), the video depicts Martin as the ghost of a deceased man returning to the mortal world and visiting his still-living lover, portrayed by Puerto Rican actress Charlotte Ayanna. The man is seen romping on a beach, gliding through the forest, and singing the song on a cliff, while his lover feels his presence and occasionally encounters his spirit as she reminisces memories of her together with him, the latter of which are shown through intersped flashbacks. The music video for the song's Spanish version is technically the same, except Martin mouths the Spanish lyrics.

Ayanna talked about the filming during a phone interview: "He picked me from a photo my agent submitted. Ricky told me he was looking for something spiritual. He wanted someone sweet and pure who has a loving quality, not a raunchy sex symbol." Cristal Mesa from mitú named the visual Martin's 17th best music video on her 2018 list, comparing it to the American romantic fantasy thriller film Ghost (1990). "Bella" won the award for Video of the Year at the 2000 Premio Lo Nuestro. "She's All I Ever Had" was nominated for Best New Artist Clip — Jazz/AC at the 1999 Billboard Music Video Awards and won the award for the Best Music Video at the 2000 Imagen Foundation Awards.

== Live performances and appearances in media ==
Martin performed "She's All I Ever Had" and "Livin' la Vida Loca" on The Oprah Winfrey Show on July 9, 1999. He then performed both songs accompanied by a group of women dressed in glitter at the 1999 MTV Video Music Awards on September 9, 1999. Maria G. Valdez from Latin Times ranked his rendition as the sixth best performance by a Latin artist at the MTV Video Music Awards, saying: "At the beginning we thought it was going to be a mystic performance, slow and focused on the vocals, but eventually it became a party and you definitely gotta see some of Ricky's best moves on full display during that performance." Wonderwall.com editors picked his performance as one of their favorite moments from MTV VMAs until 2020, and Daneesha Davis of the Miami Herald described his performance of the song as soulful. "She's All I Ever Had" was included on the set lists for Martin's the Livin' la Vida Loca Tour, the Black and White Tour, the Ricky Martin Live tour, and the All In residency. He also performed the song along with his other hits during the 13th Mawazine in 2014, while changing the pronoun from "she" to "he" in its lyrics as a protest against Morocco's anti-LGBT laws. Obie Bermúdez and Fonseca performed a live rendition of "Bella" at the Latin Recording Academy Person of the Year gala in 2006, where Martin was honored with the accolade. Ivana Mutskova covered "Bella" on the sixth season of The Voice of Bulgaria in 2019. The following year, Boris Soltariyski performed "She's All I Ever Had" as the snake on season two of the Bulgarian singing competition television series The Masked Singer.

== Formats and track listings ==
- Asian and European CD maxi-single
1. "She's All I Ever Had" (Radio Edit) – 4:15
2. "She's All I Ever Had" (Pablo Flores Radio Edit) – 4:22
3. "Bella (She's All I Ever Had)" (Pablo Flores Club Mix) – 10:14
4. "She's All I Ever Had" (Pablo Flores Club Dub) – 7:00
- Australian CD maxi-single
1. "She's All I Ever Had" (English Radio Edit) – 4:15
2. "She's All I Ever Had" (Pablo Flores Radio Edit - English) – 4:22
3. "She's All I Ever Had" (Pablo Flores Club Mix - English) – 10:14
4. "Bella (She's All I Ever Had)" (Pablo Flores Club Dub - Spanish) – 7:00
5. "Livin' la Vida Loca" (Trackmasters Remix) – 3:46
- European CD
1. "She's All I Ever Had" (English Radio Edit) – 4:22
2. "She's All I Ever Had" (Pablo Flores Radio Edit [English]) – 4:22
- Japanese CD maxi-single
1. "She's All I Ever Had" (English Radio Edit) – 4:12
2. "She's All I Ever Had" (English Album Version) – 4:55
3. "She's All I Ever Had" (Spanglish Radio Edit) – 4:13
4. "She's All I Ever Had" (Spanish Radio Edit) – 4:13
5. "She's All I Ever Had" (Pablo Flores Club Mix - Spanglish) – 10:14
- US CD
1. "She's All I Ever Had" – 4:55
2. "Bella (She's All I Ever Had)" (Spanglish Radio Edit) – 4:12
- US CD 12-inch single
1. "She's All I Ever Had" (English Club Mix) – 10:14
2. "She's All I Ever Had" (English Club Dub) – 7:00
3. "Bella (She's All I Ever Had)" (Spanglish Club Mix) – 10:14
4. "She's All I Ever Had" (English Radio Edit) – 4:12

== Credits and personnel ==
Credits adapted from Tidal and the European maxi-CD single liner notes.

Studio locations

- Recorded at Crescent Moon Studios (Miami, Florida), Westlake Studios (West Hollywood, California), and Sound Chamber Recorders (Modesto, California)
- Mixed at The Hit Factory (New York City) and Barking Doctor Recording (Mount Kisco, New York)

Personnel

- Ricky Martin – vocal, associated performer
- Jon Secada – composer, lyricist, producer, background vocal
- Robi Rosa – composer, lyricist, co-producer
- George Noriega – composer, lyricist, producer, keyboards, sitar
- Walter Afanasieff – producer
- Tommy Anthony – acoustic guitar, electric guitar
- Eric Bazilian – acoustic guitar, electric guitar
- David Campbell – arranger, conductor
- Gustavo Bonnet – assistant engineer
- Tony Mardini – assistant engineer
- Ed Williams – assistant engineer
- Jorge Casas – bass
- Rudy Stein – cello
- Larry Corbett – cello
- Suzie Katayama – cello
- Steve Richards – cello
- Dan Smith – cello
- Stefanie Fife – cello
- Randall Barlow – drum programming, recording engineer
- Kenny Aronoff – drums
- Joe Chiccarelli – engineer
- Emilio Estefan, Jr. – executive producer
- Mick Guzauski – mixing engineer
- Daniel López – percussion
- Elliot Scheiner – recording engineer
- Freddy Piñero, Jr. – recording engineer
- Javier Garza – recording engineer
- Charles Dye – recording engineer
- Scott Canto – recording engineer
- Sebastián Krys – recording engineer
- Marcelo Añez Fontana – recording engineer
- Olbin Burgos – shaker
- John Scanlon – viola
- Matt Funes – viola
- David Stenske – viola
- Denyse Buffum – viola
- Michele Richards – violin
- Susan Chatman – violin
- Virginia Frazier – violin
- Harris Goldman – violin
- Gerry Hilera – violin
- Eve Butler – violin
- Bob Sanov – violin
- Anatoly Rosinsky – violin
- Miwako Watanabe – violin
- Joel Derouin – violin
- Endre Granat – violin
- Ken Yerke – violin
- John Wittenberg – violin
- Murray Adler – violin
- Clayton Haslop – violin
- Bob Peterson – violin
- Bruce Dukov – violin
- Ruth Bruegger – violin

== Charts ==
=== Weekly charts ===
Weekly peak performance for "She's All I Ever Had"
Chart (1999)	Peak position
Australia (ARIA)	28
Belgium (Ultratop 50 Flanders)	32
Belgium (Ultratop 50 Wallonia)	30
Canada Top Singles (RPM)	3
Canada Adult Contemporary (RPM)	4
Canada CHR (Nielsen BDS)	11
Croatia International (HRT)	1
Europe (European Hot 100 Singles)	50
Finland (Suomen virallinen lista)	10
Germany (GfK)	18
Iceland (Íslenski Listinn Topp 40)	6
Italy (FIMI)	10
Italy Airplay (Music & Media)	8
Netherlands (Dutch Top 40)	16
Netherlands (Single Top 100)	19
New Zealand (Recorded Music NZ)	8
Spain (Top 40 Radio)	13
Sweden (Sverigetopplistan)	21
Switzerland (Schweizer Hitparade)	34
US Billboard Hot 100	2
US Adult Contemporary (Billboard)	4
US Adult Pop Airplay (Billboard)	20
US Pop Airplay (Billboard)	11
US Rhythmic Airplay (Billboard)	17
US Top 40 Tracks (Billboard)	5

Weekly peak performance for "Bella"
Chart (1999)	Peak position
Chile (Notimex)	7
Costa Rica (Notimex)	1
El Salvador (Notimex)	1
Guatemala (Notimex)	1
Honduras (Notimex)	2
Mexico (Notimex)	1
Nicaragua (Notimex)	2
Panama (Notimex)	1
Puerto Rico (Notimex)	2
US Hot Latin Songs (Billboard)	1
US Latin Pop Airplay (Billboard)	1
US Regional Mexican Airplay (Billboard)	39
US Tropical Airplay (Billboard)	7

=== Year-end charts ===
1999 year-end chart performance for "She's All I Ever Had"
Chart (1999)	Position
Australia (ARIA)	87
Brazil (Crowley)	6
Canada Top Singles (RPM)	37
Canada Adult Contemporary (RPM)	31
Netherlands (Dutch Top 40)	86
New Zealand (Recorded Music NZ)	19
US Billboard Hot 100	52
US Adult Contemporary (Billboard)	27
US Adult Top 40 (Billboard)	71
US Hot Latin Songs (Billboard)	14
US Mainstream Top 40 (Billboard)	49
US Rhythmic (Billboard)	67

2000 year-end chart performance for "She's All I Ever Had"
Chart (2000)	Position
US Adult Contemporary (Billboard)	22

== Certifications ==
Certifications and sales for "She's All I Ever Had"
Region	Certification	Certified units/sales
Australia (ARIA)	Gold	35,000^{^}
United States (RIAA)	Gold	500,000^{^}
^{^} Shipments figures based on certification alone.

== Release history ==
Release dates and formats for "She's All I Ever Had"
Region	Date	Format(s)	Label	Ref.
United States	June 15, 1999	CD single	Columbia	
United States	July 19, 1999	Adult contemporary; hot adult contemporary; modern adult contemporary radio	Columbia	
United States	July 20, 1999	Contemporary hit radio; rhythmic contemporary radio	Columbia	
Australia	August 30, 1999	CD maxi-single	Columbia	
Japan	September 15, 1999	CD maxi-single	Epic	
Europe	October 11, 1999	CD maxi-single	Columbia	

== See also ==
- List of number-one Billboard Hot Latin Tracks of 1999
- List of number-one Billboard Latin Pop Airplay songs of 1999
- List of Billboard Hot 100 top-ten singles in 1999
