= List of number-one albums of 1999 (Canada) =

These are the Canadian number-one albums of 1999. The chart is compiled by Nielsen Soundscan and published by Jam! Canoe, issued every Sunday. The chart also appears in Billboard magazine as Top Canadian Albums.

Issue date	Album	Artist
January 2	Big Shiny Tunes 3	Various Artists
January 9	Big Shiny Tunes 3	Various Artists
January 16	Big Shiny Tunes 3	Various Artists
January 23	Big Shiny Tunes 3	Various Artists
January 30	...Baby One More Time	Britney Spears
February 6	...Baby One More Time	Britney Spears
February 13	...Baby One More Time	Britney Spears
February 20	...Baby One More Time	Britney Spears
February 27	...Baby One More Time	Britney Spears
March 6	...Baby One More Time	Britney Spears
March 13	1999 Grammy Nominees	Various Artists
March 20	1999 Grammy Nominees	Various Artists
March 27	...Baby One More Time	Britney Spears
April 3	...Baby One More Time	Britney Spears
April 10	Sogno	Andrea Bocelli
April 17	...Baby One More Time	Britney Spears
April 24	Come On Over	Shania Twain
May 1	Come On Over	Shania Twain
May 8	Come On Over	Shania Twain
May 15	Bury the Hatchet	The Cranberries
May 22	Sogno	Andrea Bocelli
May 29	Ricky Martin	Ricky Martin
June 5	Millennium	Backstreet Boys
June 12	Millennium	Backstreet Boys
June 19	Millennium	Backstreet Boys
June 26	Millennium	Backstreet Boys
July 3	Ricky Martin	Ricky Martin
July 10	Ricky Martin	Ricky Martin
July 17	Ricky Martin	Ricky Martin
July 24	Ricky Martin	Ricky Martin
July 31	Ricky Martin	Ricky Martin
August 7	Ricky Martin	Ricky Martin
August 14	Other	Limp Bizkit
August 21	Other	Limp Bizkit
August 28	Other	Limp Bizkit
September 4	Millennium	Backstreet Boys
September 11	Christina Aguilera	Christina Aguilera
September 18	Significant Other	Limp Bizkit
September 25	Significant Other	Limp Bizkit
October 2	Beautiful Midnight	Matthew Good Band
October 9	Happiness... Is Not a Fish That You Can Catch	Our Lady Peace
October 16	Human Clay	Creed
October 23	The Distance to Here	Live
October 30	A Little Bit of Mambo	Lou Bega
November 6	A Little Bit of Mambo	Lou Bega
November 13	A Little Bit of Mambo	Lou Bega
November 20	The Battle of Los Angeles	Rage Against the Machine
November 27	Affirmation	Savage Garden
December 4	All the Way... A Decade of Song	Céline Dion
December 11	Big Shiny Tunes 4	Various Artists
December 18	Big Shiny Tunes 4	Various Artists
December 25	Big Shiny Tunes 4	Various Artists

== See also ==
- List of Canadian number-one singles of 1999
