= Ricky Martin (1999 album) =

1999 studio album by Ricky Martin

Studio album by Ricky Martin
- Released: May 11, 1999
- Recorded: 1998–1999
- Studio: Various (see recording locations)
- Genres: Dance-pop; pop; rock
- Length: 59:16
- Languages: English; Spanish
- Label: Columbia
- Producers: Desmond Child; Draco Rosa; Emilio Estefan; Jon Secada; George Noriega; Madonna; William Orbit; Randall Barlow; Walter Afanasieff; Juan Vicente Zambrano

Ricky Martin chronology
Vuelve (1998)	Ricky Martin (1999)	Sound Loaded (2000)

Singles from Ricky Martin
- 1. "Livin' la Vida Loca" Released: March 23, 1999; 2. "She's All I Ever Had" Released: June 15, 1999; 3. "Shake Your Bon-Bon" Released: October 12, 1999; 4. "Private Emotion" Released: February 8, 2000

Ricky Martin is the first English album and fifth studio album by Puerto Rican singer Ricky Martin. Columbia Records released it on May 11, 1999. Following the release of four Spanish-language albums, and the huge success of his fourth studio album, Vuelve (1998), Martin announced the recording of his first English-language album. He worked with producers KC Porter, Robi Rosa, and Desmond Child to create the album. Musically, Ricky Martin consists of dance-pop tracks, power ballads, mid-tempo pop songs, and rock numbers. After the album's release, Martin embarked on the worldwide Livin' la Vida Loca Tour, which was the highest-grossing tour of 2000 by a Latin artist.

The album was supported by four singles. The lead single "Livin' la Vida Loca" topped the charts in more than 20 countries and is considered to be Martin's biggest hit and one of the best-selling singles of all time. It topped the Billboard Hot 100 chart for five consecutive weeks, becoming Martin's first number one single on the chart. Follow-up singles "She's All I Ever Had", "Shake Your Bon-Bon", and "Private Emotion" became number one and top 10 hits around the world. Ricky Martin received generally favorable reviews from music critics, who complimented its various genres and styles. Paste ranked the album as one of the "10 Best Solo Albums by Former Boy Band Members" in 2020. It was nominated for Best Pop Album at the 42nd Annual Grammy Awards.

The album was a commercial success. It debuted atop the US Billboard 200 with first-week sales of 661,000 copies, becoming the largest sales week by any album in 1999 and breaking the record as the largest first-week sales for any pop or Latin artist in history. Additionally, it made Martin the first male Latin act in history to debut at number one on Billboard 200. Ricky Martin also topped the charts in Australia, Canada, and Spain, among others. The album has received several certifications, including 7× platinum in the United States, and diamond in Canada. Only within three months, it became the best-selling album ever by a Latin artist. It is generally seen as the album that began the "Latin explosion" and paved the way for a large number of other Latin artists such as Jennifer Lopez, Shakira, Christina Aguilera, Marc Anthony, Santana, and Enrique Iglesias.

== Background and recording ==
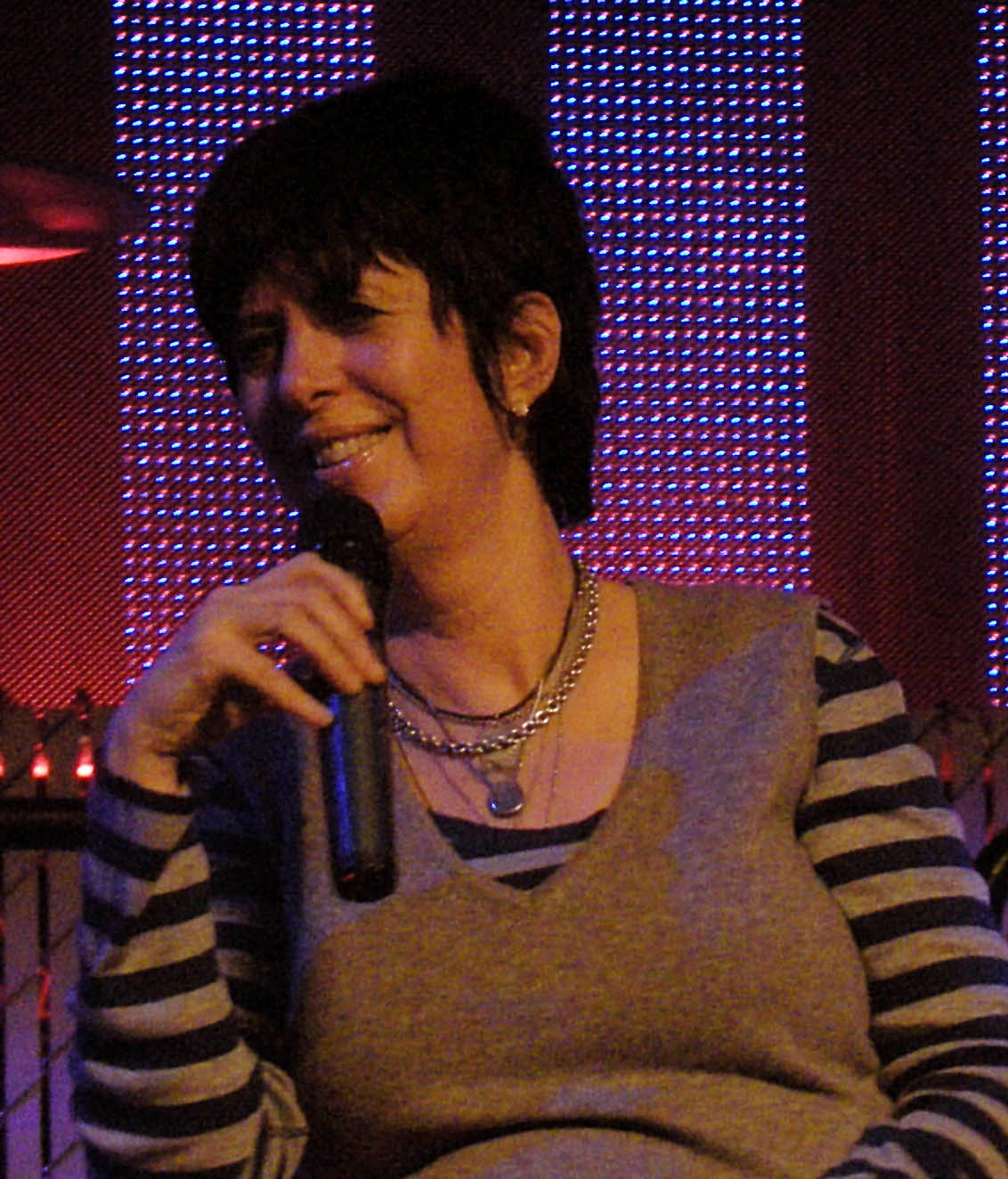
Diane Warren (pictured) wrote two songs for the album.

In 1998, Ricky Martin released his fourth studio album, Vuelve. The album experienced both critical and commercial success, spending 26 weeks atop the US Billboard Top Latin Albums chart. "La Copa de la Vida" was released as the second single from the album, and became the official song of the 1998 FIFA World Cup in France. It topped the charts in more than 30 countries, and Martin performed it at the 41st Annual Grammy Awards, which was greeted with a massive standing ovation and met with acclaim from music critics. On October 22, 1998, CNN confirmed that Martin had started working on his first English language album, following the huge success of Vuelve. On March 6, 1999, almost two weeks after his Grammy performance, it was announced that the album had been set for release in May. While the album was still untitled at the time, American musician Diane Warren revealed that she contributed two songs to the album, which was produced by KC Porter, Robi Rosa, and Desmond Child. During an interview with the Orlando Sentinel, Martin told the newspaper that this album has Asian influences:

I spent half the year in Asia last year, and at the same time I was recording my album. I went back to the studio and told them how I was affected by these beautiful sounds.

On April 24, 1999, Billboard revealed the album's title as eponymous in an article, mentioning that it was initially set for retail on May 25, 1999. However, the huge interest in the disc encouraged Columbia Records to decide to rush the album to release two weeks ahead of schedule, on May 11. Tom Corson, the senior vice president of marketing at Columbia explained: "Quite simply, the market has demanded it. People have been wanting this record for a while, and it's now reached the point where we have to get it out there immediately." Tim Devin, the general manager of Tower Records in New York added about Martin: "He's always been one of our strongest Latin artists, but interest in him has picked up considerably since that performance." In an interview with MTV, Martin told the channel about the album's title: "I cannot wear a mask to go on stage. Those are my influences. This is Ricky Martin. That's why the album is called Ricky Martin. As simple is that. We want to keep it simple. Like Einstein said, 'Let's make it simple, but not simpler than what it is.' And this is me."

== Music and lyrics ==
"Be Careful (Cuidado Con Mi Corazón)"
A 15-second sample of the chorus of "Be Careful (Cuidado Con Mi Corazón)", which blends both Martin and Madonna's voices and features Spanglish lyrics on a down-tempo tune.

Ricky Martin is a primarily English language album composed of 14 songs, consisting dance-pop tracks, power ballads, mid-tempo pop songs, and "straight-ahead" rock numbers. Ed Morales from Democrat and Chronicle stated that the album "runs the gamut from ska and rock' n' roll to Latin pop". "Livin' la Vida Loca" (transl. "Livin' the Crazy Life") is a rock-etched up-tempo pop song that features Latin percussion rhythms and horn riffs mixed with surf rock-inspired guitar riffs. It has salsa-rock fusion influences, and is about an irresistible, particularly sinister wild woman who lives on the edge, seducing others into her crazy world. The album also contains a Spanish-language version of "Livin' la Vida Loca", which was recorded under the same title.

In "Spanish Eyes", Martin refers to sultriness, tango, and dance over salsa descarga and up-tempo beats. The ballad "She's All I Ever Had" uses an Indian guitar and lyrically, is the tale of a man missing his woman, as he continues to live and breathe for her. It also has a Spanish version titled "Bella" (transl. "Beautiful"). Martin dedicated the track to his grandmother who died a year earlier. "Shake Your Bon-Bon" is a salsa party track and features a mix of pop, R&B, Middle Eastern riffs, and Latin horns, as well as a fusion of Latin percussion with retro organ. A Spanglish guitar-based down-tempo duet along with Madonna, "Be Careful (Cuidado con mi corazón)" mixes acoustic and electronic elements.

"I Am Made of You" is a "metal-type" ballad and uses electric guitar and drums that create a theme of "nostalgia and rock", while "Love You for a Day" is a "high-energy" Latin funk track featuring Latin elements, such as lengthy descargas, piano tumbaos, Latin percussion, and horns. The ballad "Private Emotion", which features a guest appearance by Swedish singer Meja is a cover version of a song under the same title by the Hooters for their fifth studio album Out of Body (1993). "You Stay With Me" is a slow ballad with "heart-wrenching" lyrics, and "I Count the Minutes" is a homage to the 1980s. Ricky Martin also features the Spanglish radio edit versions of "La Copa de la Vida" and "María", which were released as singles for Martin's previous albums. This version of "María" is remixed by Puerto Rican DJ Pablo Flores, who upped the tempo and the sex appeal of the song, turning the slow-burn flamenco laced track into an up-tempo samba tune in a house bassline. "La Copa de la Vida" is a samba-rooted Latin pop song, and features elements of batucada, salsa, dance, mambo, and Europop. Throughout the song, Martin carries a "soccer-heavy" message with fully positive lyrics.

== Singles ==
Columbia Records released "Livin' la Vida Loca" to radio stations on March 23, 1999, as the lead single from the album. The song topped the charts in more than 20 countries and is considered to be Martin's biggest hit, and one of the best-selling singles of all time. In the United States, it topped the Billboard Hot 100 chart for five consecutive weeks, becoming Martin's first number one single on the chart. Additionally, it broke several records on Billboard charts. It also spent eight consecutive weeks atop the Canada Top Singles chart and topped the country's year-end chart. In the United Kingdom, it debuted at number one and stayed there for three weeks, making Martin the first Puerto Rican artist in history to hit number one. The track was ranked as the best '90s pop song by Elle, and was listed among the Best Latin Songs of All Time by Billboard. It was nominated for four categories at the 42nd Annual Grammy Awards, including Record of the Year and Song of the Year. Its Spanish version reached the summit of the Billboard Hot Latin Tracks chart in the United States, and was nominated for Record of the Year at the 2000 Latin Grammy Awards.

"She's All I Ever Had" was released as the second single from the album on June 15, 1999. It peaked at numbers two and three on the US Billboard Hot 100 and Canada Top Singles charts, respectively. The Spanish version, "Bella" topped the charts in Costa Rica, El Salvador, Guatemala, Mexico, and Panama, as well as Billboard's Hot Latin Tracks chart. It also peaked at number two in Honduras, Nicaragua, and Puerto Rico. The third single from Ricky Martin, "Shake Your Bon-Bon" was released on October 12, 1999; it reached the top 10 in Canada, Finland, and New Zealand, as well as the top 15 in Spain, Scotland, and the United Kingdom. In the United States, it peaked at number 22 on the Hot 100. The album's final single, "Private Emotion", was launched on February 8, 2000. It reached number one in the Czech Republic, and was a top 10 hit in Finland, Norway, Scotland, Sweden, Switzerland, and the United Kingdom. Music videos were filmed for both English and Spanish versions of "Livin' la Vida Loca", "She's All I Ever Had", "Bella", "Shake Your Bon-Bon", and "Private Emotion".

== Marketing ==
=== Release ===
Ricky Martin was released worldwide by Columbia Records on May 11, 1999. The European edition of Ricky Martin includes the Spanish version of "Spanish Eyes", titled "La Diosa Del Carnaval" (transl. "The Goddess of Carnival"), as well as a new track "I'm On My Way", while the Spanglish radio edit versions of "La Copa de la Vida" and "María" are not featured. This track list has been also used for the African, Asian, and Latin American editions. The Chinese edition contains both "La Copa de la Vida" and "María" in addition to the standard Asian track list. The Spanish release uses the same track list as the European, but "Por Arriba, Por Abajo" (transl. "Upwards, Downwards") from Martin's previous album, Vuelve, has been added as a hidden track as well. According to The Wall Street Journal, Martin succeeded Leonardo DiCaprio as "the reigning king of heartthrobs" to become the most popular male celebrity on the American shopping website eBay in 1999, following the album's release. Many Martin products and items were on sale at the time, such as his posters, autographs, Pepsi cans, wall clocks, plastic dolls, autographed Ricky Martin CDs, and "Livin' la Vida Loca" sheet musics.

=== Live performances ===
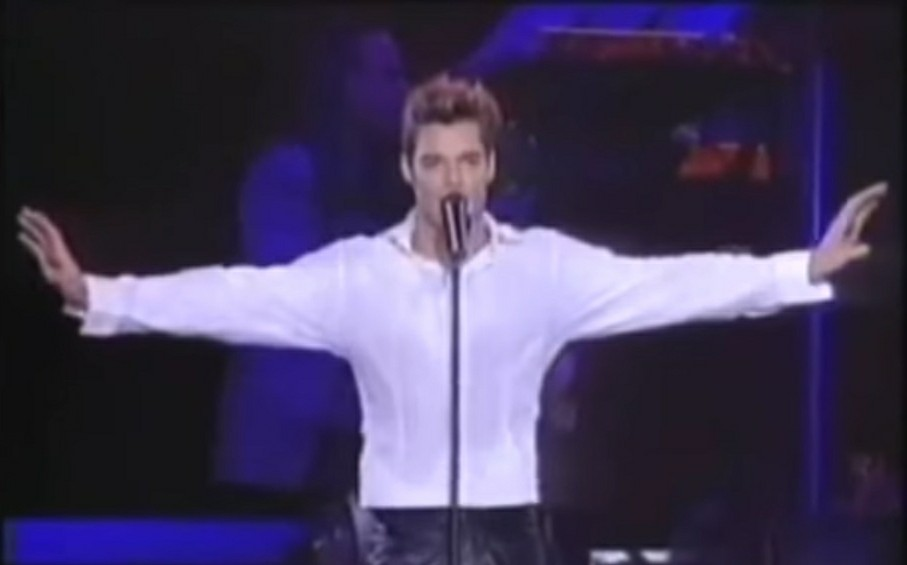
Martin performing "Spanish Eyes" on the worldwide Livin' la Vida Loca Tour.

To further promote Ricky Martin, he embarked on the worldwide Livin' la Vida Loca Tour. The tour began on October 21, 1999, at the Miami Arena in Miami, Florida, and concluded on October 25, 2000, at the Colonial Stadium in Melbourne, with concerts throughout North America, Europe, Oceania, and Asia. In the United States, the Livin' la Vida Loca Tour was the highest-grossing tour of 2000 by a Latin artist, earning over $36.3 million with 44 dates and drawing 617,488 fans. According to Billboard Boxscore, the tour grossed $51.3 million in Canada, Mexico, and the United States, with 60 shows and drawing an audience of 875,151. International dates were not reported to Boxscore and would push the tour's grosses higher. In addition to his tour, Martin performed singles from Ricky Martin on many television programs and award shows. He performed "Livin' la Vida Loca" at the 1999 World Music Awards, the 1999 Blockbuster Entertainment Awards, Saturday Night Live, The Rosie O'Donnell Show, The Tonight Show with Jay Leno, and Bingolotto TV Show. At the 1999 MTV Video Music Awards, he performed "She's All I Ever Had" and "Livin' la Vida Loca", accompanied by a group of impressive women dressed in glitter. To promote the album's material in the United Kingdom, Martin delivered performances of "Livin' la Vida Loca" and "Shake Your Bon-Bon" on the BBC's Top of the Pops on August 6, 1999, and November 19, 1999, respectively.

== Critical reception ==
Professional ratings
Review scores
Source	Rating
AllMusic	4/5 stars
The Atlanta Journal-Constitution	B
Billboard	3.5/5 stars
Daily News	B
The Indianapolis Star	3.5/4 stars
The News Journal	3/4 stars
Orlando Sentinel	3.5/5 stars
Rolling Stone	3/5 stars
Spin	7/10
The Times	3/4 stars

Ricky Martin has been met with generally favorable reviews from music critics. In a retrospective review for AllMusic, senior editor Stephen Thomas Erlewine gave the album four out of five stars and said that despite moments of filler and outdated production, its songs are balanced well between various genres and styles on "a big, bold album with something to please everyone, from his longtime Latin fans to housewives with a weakness for dramatic ballads". He noted that all tracks have been constructed carefully on their own, and complimented Martin's "fine voice and undeniable charisma" that bring all tracks "alive", calling him "a true star". Rolling Stone's James Hunter felt it lacks the excitement of Martin's 1998 album Vuelve because of its remixes and Warren-penned songs. However, he said that Martin's take on Latin pop is made interesting enough by highlights such as "Livin' la Vida Loca", "Shake Your Bon-Bon", and the "perfectly constructed ballad" sung with Madonna.

The News Journal critic Jena Montgomery complimented Ricky Martin for alternating between "infectious tunes" and "somber, seductive ballads", stating that his "upbeat pop tunes will undoubtedly catch your ear and stay in your head" and the ballads "are strikingly well-written and performed". She added that Martin "sings with such passion and tenderness" that "keeps you hanging on, begging for more". Steve Dollar from The Atlanta Journal-Constitution described the album as "shockingly irresistible", and Jim Farber from Daily News thought it is "certainly an improvement over Martin's four Spanish records". The Indianapolis Star reviewer Diana Penner gave it three out of four stars, describing Martin's pop tunes as "melodic and eminently listenable". She also highlighted "Livin' la Vida Loca", confessing that she does not know any "more happy-snappy catchy melody" than that. Another author of The Indianapolis Star praised Martin for mixing styles well from pop to funk, and noted the album tracks' Latin rhythms that make "Martin automatically separate himself from the rest of "popular male artists".

The Times staff assured Martin would be a "household name" before the end of the summer, and described the project as "cheesy, breezy, mass-appeal pop". The staff also called the duet with Madonna "superb" and celebrated Martin's "sincerely" singing with Meja. In a retrospective review for Billboard, Leila Cobo described Ricky Martin as "an album that went from percussion-filled dance tracks" to "smooth, unabashedly romantic ballads". She ranked "Livin' la Vida Loca" as the best track on the album and praised most of the other tracks of the record, naming "Private Emotion" the "under-appreciated jewel" of the album and calling it a "gorgeous ballad". She noted "immediately hummable melodies, traces of nostalgia and rock" in "I Am Made of You", labeling the track "a beauty". In another article, she described Ricky Martin as dazzling. Coinciding with the album's 20th anniversary, Celia San Miguel of Tidal Magazine gave it a positive review, highlighting "Livin' la Vida Loca" for its "clever fusion of ska, rock, mambo, swing and pop sounds", and "She's All I Ever Had" for Martin's "charismatic heartthrob and his passionate and emotive vocals". She stated that "in 1999, Martin's star power became undeniable". In 2020, Daniella Boik from Paste acknowledged the album as Martin's most influential album since starting his solo career.

== Accolades ==
In 2019, Stacker ranked Ricky Martin as the 18th best album by an LGBTQ musician. In 2020, Paste ranked it at number eight on the list of "Best Solo Albums by Former Boy Band Members". The album has received a number of awards and nominations. It was nominated for Best Pop Album at the 42nd Annual Grammy Awards, but lost to Brand New Day by Sting.

Awards and nominations for Ricky Martin
Organization	Year	Award	Result	Ref.
Pop Corn Music Awards	1999	Best Foreign Album	Won	
Premios Globo	1999	Best Pop/Ballad Album	Won	
ACE Awards	2000	Male Album of the Year	Won	
Blockbuster Entertainment Awards	2000	Favorite CD	Nominated	
Blockbuster Entertainment Awards	2000	Favorite Male Artist, Pop	Won	
Gardel Awards	2000	Best Male Album	Nominated	
Grammy Awards	2000	Best Pop Album	Nominated	
Japan Gold Disc Award	2000	Pop Album of the Year, International	Won	
Juno Awards	2000	Best Selling Album (Foreign or Domestic)	Nominated	
Premio Lo Nuestro	2000	Pop Album of the Year	Nominated	

== Commercial performance ==
Ricky Martin debuted atop the US Billboard 200 with first-week sales of 661,000 copies, according to data compiled by Nielsen SoundScan for the chart dated May 29, 1999. It became the largest sales week by any album in 1999, surpassing I Am... by Nas, which had sold 471,000 copies in its first week. It also broke the record as the largest first-week sales for any pop or Latin artist in history, as well as any Columbia Records artist during the SoundScan era. With this album, Martin became the first male Latin act in history to debut at number one on the US Billboard 200 chart. Additionally, he became the first artist to simultaneously top the Billboard 200, Hot Latin Tracks, Hot Dance Music/Club Play, Hot Dance Music/Maxi-Singles Sales, Top 40 Tracks, and the Billboard Hot 100. The following week, the album sold 471,000 copies, while Millennium by Backstreet Boys debuted at number one on Billboard 200 with first-week sales of 1.13 million copies, breaking Ricky Martin's record as the largest sales week by an album in 1999.

Ricky Martin sold a total of six million copies in the United States in 1999 and was the third best-selling album of the year in the country, only behind Millennium, and ...Baby One More Time by Britney Spears. In January 2000, Ricky Martin was certified 7× platinum by the Recording Industry Association of America (RIAA), denoting shipments of over seven million copies in the US and breaking the record as the best-selling album by a Latin artist in the country. As of January 2011, the album has sold over 6,958,000 copies in the country, according to Nielsen SoundScan, with an additional 987,000 sold at BMG Music Clubs, making it Martin's best-selling album in the US. Nielsen SoundScan does not count copies sold through clubs like the BMG Music Service, which were significantly popular in the 1990s.

The album debuted at number one in Australia, on the chart issue dated May 23, 1999. It was later certified triple platinum by the Australian Recording Industry Association (ARIA), denoting shipments of over 210,000 copies in the country. In Canada, it peaked at number one on both the RPM's Top 100 CDs chart and the Billboard's Canadian Albums Chart, and was certified diamond by the Canadian Recording Industry Association (CRIA), denoting shipments of over one million units in the region. The album also reached number one in Spain, where it was certified triple platinum by the Productores de Música de España (Promusicae), denoting shipments of over 300,000 copies. Additionally, Ricky Martin peaked at number one in Europe, Finland, New Zealand, and Norway, as well as the top five in many countries, such as Germany, Japan, and the United Kingdom. In Japan, it was certified million by the Recording Industry Association of Japan (RIAJ), denoting shipments of over one million units. Only within three months, Ricky Martin became the best-selling album ever by a Latin artist. According to different sources, the album has sold over 15 million copies or even 17 million copies worldwide.

== Legacy and influence ==
"Twenty-one years ago Puerto Rican heartthrob Ricky Martin led the Latin explosion with the release of his English-language self-titled album."

— Billboard's Lucas Villa in 2020.

Martin is regarded by the media as the "Original Latin Crossover King". Angie Romero from Billboard wrote: "If you look up 'crossover' in the dictionary, there should be a photo of Ricky shaking his bon bon and/or 'Livin' la Vida Loca'." Following his performance of "The Cup of Life" at the Grammys, and the success of "Livin' la Vida Loca" and Ricky Martin (1999), he opened the gates for many Latin artists such as Jennifer Lopez, Shakira, Christina Aguilera, Marc Anthony, Santana, and Enrique Iglesias who released their crossover albums and followed him onto the top of the charts. Jim Farber from Daily News noted that Ricky Martin "provides a textbook example of how to mix Latin beats with pop tunes and rock intonations". Lucas Villa from Spin wrote about Martin's global success in 1999: "When the world went loca for Ricky, he led the way for other Latin music superstars like Spain's Enrique Iglesias, Colombia's Shakira and Nuyoricans like Jennifer Lopez and Marc Anthony to make their marks beyond the Spanish-speaking crowds." St. Louis Post-Dispatch critic Kevin C. Johnson described Martin as Latin music's "pretty-faced poster boy" who is "taking the music to places Jon Secada, Selena and Santana never could". He also mentioned that even "Gloria Estefan at her peak, failed to muster up the kind of hype and hoopla surrounding Martin".

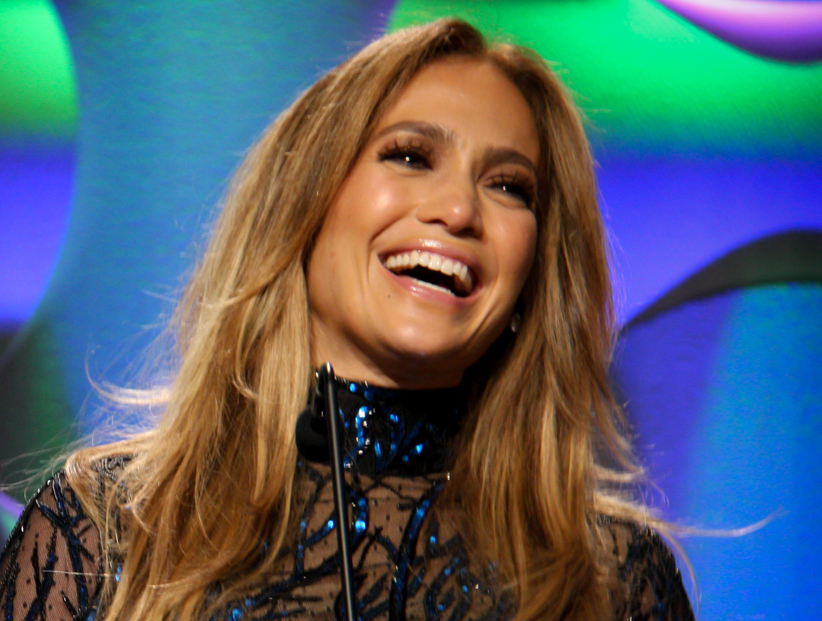
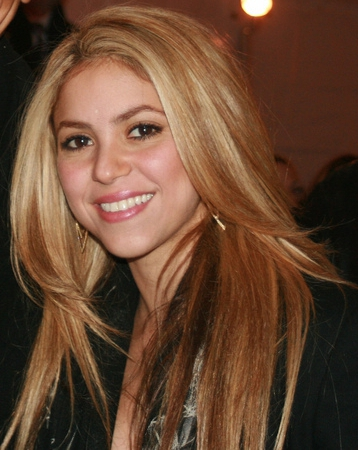
Martin opened the doors for many Latin artists, such as Jennifer Lopez (left) and Shakira (right) to top the charts beyond the Spanish-speaking markets.

Celia San Miguel of Tidal Magazine stated that Martin "highlighted the public's thirst for a different kind of pop" in 1999, noting the album's "fusion-heavy" and "hip-shaking rhythms associated with Latin music". She mentioned that the album "spawned 1999's Latin music boom", emphasizing the fact that Martin created the "spark" of the "Latin Pop Explosion", which was followed by 1999 albums, On the 6 by Lopez, Enrique by Iglesias, and Anthony's eponymous album. She continued crediting "Martin and the paths he created" responsible for the Latin music and Spanish and Spanglish lyrics being "a commonplace phenomenon on English-language radio" in 2019. In her review for Grammy.com, Ana Monroy Yglesias said Martin led a "major music moment in 1999" with Ricky Martin, and along with him, "the first major boom of Spanish-language artists", such as Shakira and Lopez, came into the "U.S. pop landscape". Geoff Mayfield from Billboard stated: "Martin's triumph isn't just a big win for Latin music or the Sony camp but a big day for the entire music industry."

According to Pitchfork, the music industry took in revenues of $23.7 billion in 1999, making it the peak year of the business in history. It was also a significant growth in compare with 1998. The website highlighted ...Baby One More Time, Ricky Martin, and Millennium as examples of "blockbuster albums" which produced the result. Also, Rolling Stone's Rob Sheffield described 1999 as "the year music exploded", mentioning Spears, Aguilera, Martin, NSYNC, and the Backstreet Boys as "a new breed of stars" who got born. Additionally, Jason Lipshutz from Billboard labeled 1999 "[the] Best Musical Year of the '90s".

== Track listing ==
Ricky Martin – Australian, North American, and UK edition
No.	Title	Writer(s)	Producer(s)	Length
1.	"Livin' la Vida Loca"	Robi Rosa; Desmond Child	Desmond Child	4:03
2.	"Spanish Eyes"	Desmond Child; Rosa	Desmond Child	4:05
3.	"She's All I Ever Had"	Jon Secada; Rosa; George Noriega	George Noriega; Jon Secada; Walter Afanasieff	4:55
4.	"Shake Your Bon-Bon"	Rosa; Desmond Child; George Noriega	Noriega	3:12
5.	"Be Careful (Cuidado Con Mi Corazón)" (duet with Madonna)	Madonna; William Orbit	Orbit; Madonna	4:02
6.	"I Am Made of You"	Desmond Child; Rosa	Desmond Child	4:39
7.	"Love You for a Day"	Randall Barlow; Rosa; Desmond Child	Barlow	3:45
8.	"Private Emotion" (duet with Meja)	Eric Bazilian; Robert Hyman	Desmond Child	4:01
9.	"The Cup of Life" (Pablo Flores Spanglish Radio Edit) (The Official Song of the World Cup, France '98)	Rosa; Luis Gómez-Escolar; Desmond Child	Desmond Child; Rosa	4:37
10.	"You Stay with Me"	Diane Warren	Desmond Child	4:12
11.	"Livin' la Vida Loca" (Spanish Version)	Desmond Child; Gómez-Escolar; Rosa	Desmond Child	4:03
12.	"I Count the Minutes"	Warren	Afanasieff	4:17
13.	"Bella" (She's All I Ever Had)	Gómez-Escolar; Noriega; Secada; Rosa	Secada; Afanasieff; Noriega	4:54
14.	"María" (Spanglish Radio Edit)	Rosa; Gómez-Escolar; KC Porter	Porter; Pablo Flores; Javier Garza	4:31
Total length:				59:16

Ricky Martin – Asian, European, and Latin American edition
No.	Title	Writer(s)	Producer(s)	Length
6.	"Love You for a Day"	Barlow; Rosa; Desmond Child	Barlow	3:43
7.	"Private Emotion" (Ricky Martin & Meja)	Bazilian; Hyman	Desmond Child	4:01
8.	"I'm on My Way"	Child; Rosa; Juan Vicente Zambrano	Zambrano	4:36
9.	"I Am Made of You"	Desmond Child; Rosa	Desmond Child	4:32
10.	"La Diosa del Carnaval" (Spanish Eyes)	Gómez-Escolar; Child; Rosa	Child; Rosa	3:58
11.	"You Stay With Me"	Warren	Desmond Child	4:14
12.	"Livin' la Vida Loca" (Spanish Version)	Desmond Child; Gómez-Escolar; Rosa	Desmond Child	4:03
13.	"Bella" (She's All I Ever Had)	Gómez-Escolar; Noriega; Secada; Rosa	Secada; Afanasieff; Noriega	4:55
14.	"I Count the Minutes"	Warren	Afanasieff	4:17

Spanish hidden bonus track
No.	Title	Writer(s)	Producer(s)	Length
15.	"Por Arriba, Por Abajo" (Remix)	Gómez-Escolar; Rosa; Cesar Lemos; Karla Aponte	Porter; Rosa	4:17

== Personnel ==
Credits for Ricky Martin adapted from AllMusic and the album liner notes.

=== Recording and mixing locations ===
- The Gentlemen's Club, Miami Beach, Florida
- Sound Chamber, Modesto, California
- Crescent Moon Studios, Coral Terrace, Florida
- Guerilla Beach Studios, Toledo, Ohio
- Enterprise Studios, Burbank, California
- Right Track Recording, Manhattan
- Ocean Way Recording, Los Angeles
- Clinton Recording Studio, New York City
- Wallyworld, Pittsburgh
- The Hit Factory, New York City
- Barking Doctor Recording, Mount Kisco, New York
- Heaven Studios, Miami
- Tone King Studios, Cardinal, Ontario

=== Musicians and technical ===
- Ricky Martin – performer, primary artist, vocals, background vocals
- KC Porter – composer, producer
- Robi Rosa – composer, guest artist, acoustic guitar, producer, background vocals
- Desmond Child – composer, producer
- Ethel Abelson – violin
- Murray Adler – violin
- Walter Afanasieff – drum programming, producer
- Martin Agee – violin
- Donna Allen – background vocals
- Lamar Alsop – violin
- Richard Altenbach – violin
- Rusty Anderson – guitar
- Tommy Anthony – acoustic guitar, electric guitar
- Jonathan Antin – hair stylist
- Iris Aponte – production coordination
- Chris Apostle – project coordinator
- Kenny Aronoff – drums, guest artist
- Vaje Ayrikian – cello
- Julien Barber – viola
- Randall Barlow – composer, engineer, guitar, programming, string arrangements, trumpet
- Eric Bazilian – composer, 12 string acoustic guitar, electric guitar
- Jennifer Bellusci – performer
- Brian Benning – violin
- Robert Berg – viola
- Ian Blake – composer, producer
- Gustavo Bonnet – assistant engineer
- Alfred Brown – viola
- Ruth Bruegger – violin
- Denyse Buffum – viola
- Olbin Burgos – percussion, shaker
- Kenneth Burward-Hoy – viola
- Eve Butler – violin
- Jorge Calandrelli – conductor, string arrangements
- David Campbell – conductor, orchestra contractor
- Darius Campo – violin
- Scott Canto – engineer
- Randy Cantor – arranger, keyboards, programming
- Sue Ann Carwell – background vocals
- Jorge Casas – performer
- Susan Chatman – violin
- Robert Chausow – violin
- Rob Chiarelli – engineer
- Joe Chiccarelli – engineer
- Brian Coleman – production coordination
- Tony Concepcion – flugelhorn, trumpet
- Roberta Cooper – cello
- Larry Corbett – cello
- Paulinho Da Costa – percussion
- Brian Dembow – viola
- Joel Derouin – violin
- John Dexter – viola
- Thomas Diener – viola
- Assa Drori – violin
- Bruce Dukov – concert master, violin
- Charles Dye – engineer, mixing
- Max Ellen – violin
- Mark Endert – engineer
- Luis Enrique – guest artist, percussion
- Jerry Epstein – viola
- Stephen Erdody – cello
- Luis Gómez-Escolar – composer
- Emilio Estefan Jr. – executive producer
- David Ewart – violin
- Mary Helen Ewing – viola
- Benny Faccone – engineer
- Henry Ferber – violin
- Michael Ferril – violin
- Stefanie Fife – cello
- Alfred Figueroa – assistant engineer
- Pablo Flores – producer
- Dave Frazier – engineer
- Virginia Frazier – violin
- Tod French – cello
- Erik Friedlander – cello
- Matthew Funes – viola
- Armen Garabedian – violin
- Berj Garabedian – violin
- Hector Garrido – conductor, horn arrangements, string arrangements
- Javier Garza – engineer
- David Gleeson – engineer
- Harris Goldman – violin
- Jules Gondar – engineer
- Diva Goodfriend-Koven – alto flute
- Erwin Gorostiza – art direction, design
- Endre Granat – violin
- Lynn Grants – viola
- Maurice Grants – cello
- Julie Green – viloncello
- Jeff Gregory – assistant engineer
- Henry Gronnier – violin
- Alan Grunfeld – violin
- Mick Guzauski – mixing
- Gyan – guest artist
- Juliet Haffner – viola
- Don Hahn – engineer
- Clayton Haslop – violin
- John Hayhurst – viola
- Paquito Hechavarria – piano
- David Heiss – viloncello
- Leo Herrera – assistant engineer
- Al Hershberger – violin
- Gerry Hilera – violin
- Tiffany Yi Hu – violin
- Rob Hyman – composer, organ
- Joanna Ifrah – A&R
- Ted Jensen – mastering
- Skyler Jett – performer, background vocals
- Lisa Johnson – violin
- Pat Johnson – violin
- Pat Johnson – violin
- Karen Karlsrud – violin
- Dennis Karmazyn – cello
- Suzie Katayama – cello
- Khris Kellow – programming
- Aimee Kreston – violin
- John Kricker – trombone
- Sebastián Krys – engineer
- Janet Lakatos – viola
- Michael Landau – electric guitar
- Regis Landiorio – violin
- Ann Leathers – violin
- Damian leGassick – keyboards, programming
- Brian Leonard – violin
- Lee Levin – drums
- Elizabeth Lim – violin
- Richard Locker – cello
- Daniel López – percussion
- Manny López – guitar
- Craig Lozowick – assistant engineer, engineer
- Madonna – composer, guest artist, performer, primary artist, producer
- Nathan Malki – assistant engineer, engineer
- Tony Mardini – assistant engineer
- Mark Markman – violin
- Peter McCabe – engineer
- Patrick McCarthy – engineer, mixing
- Hugh McDonald – bass
- Ángelo Medina – executive producer
- Meja – duet, guest artist, primary artist
- Lester Mendez – programming
- Steve Menezes – assistant engineer
- Vicky Miscolczy – viola
- Dennis Molchan – violin
- Conesha Monet – background vocals
- Jorge Moraga – viola
- Horia Moroaica – violin
- Herman "Teddy" Mulet – horn
- Jennifer Munday – violin
- Dan Neufeld – viola
- George Noriega – bass, bazouki, composer, nylon string guitar, organ, producer, sitar
- Laura Oatts – violin
- William Orbit – composer, Guest Artist, guitar, keyboards, producer
- Germán Ortiz – assistant engineer
- Rik Pekkonen – engineer
- Archie Pena – percussion
- Bob Peterson – violin
- Freddy Piñero Jr. – engineer
- Barbara Porter – violin
- Jim Porto – assistant engineer
- Anthony Posk – violin
- Sue Pray – viola
- Rachel Purkin – violin
- Rita Quintero – background vocals
- Matthew Raimondi – violin
- Dave Reitzas – engineer
- Steve Richards – cello
- Claytoven Richardson – background vocals
- Karen Ritscher – viola
- Gil Romero – violin
- Anatoly Rosinsky – violin
- Elliot Rosoff – violin
- Danita Ruiz – project coordinator
- Eddie Salkin – alto flute
- Bob Sanov – violin
- Sheldon Sanov – violin
- Elliot Scheiner – engineer
- Laura Seaton – violin
- Jon Secada – composer, guest artist, background vocals
- Dan Shea – keyboards, programming
- Mark Orrin Shuman – cello
- David Siegel – clarinet
- Daniel Smith – cello
- Rafael Solano – percussion
- Eve Sprecher – violin
- Rudy Stein – cello
- David Stenske – viola
- Dale Stuckenbruck – violin
- Ricardo Suarez – bass
- Marti Sweet – violin
- Gerald Tarack – violin
- Dana Teboe – trombone
- Richard Treat – cello
- Mari Tsumura – violin
- Diego Uchitel – photography
- Robert Valdez – engineer
- Jose Luis Vega – image construction
- John Walz – cello
- Dan Warner – acoustic guitar
- Diane Warren – composer
- Miwako Watanabe – violin
- Belinda Whitney-Barratt – violin
- Chris Wiggins – assistant engineer
- Ed Williams – assistant engineer
- Elizabeth Wilson – violin
- John Wittenberg – violin
- Ming Yeh – violin
- Ken Yerke – violin
- Juan Vincente Zambrano – arranger, keyboards
- Mihail Zinovyev – viola
- Shari Zippert – violin
- Wassim Zreik – assistant engineer

== Charts ==
=== Weekly charts ===
Weekly chart performance for Ricky Martin
Chart (1999–2000)	Peak position
Australian Albums (ARIA)	1
Austrian Albums (Ö3 Austria)	3
Belgian Albums (Ultratop Flanders)	16
Belgian Albums (Ultratop Wallonia)	21
Canada Top Albums/CDs (RPM)	1
Canadian Albums (Billboard)	1
Danish Albums (Hitlisten)	5
Dutch Albums (Album Top 100)	18
European Albums (Top 100)	1
Finnish Albums (Suomen virallinen lista)	1
French Albums (SNEP)	21
German Albums (Offizielle Top 100)	2
Hungarian Albums (MAHASZ)	3
Irish Albums (IRMA)	5
Italian Albums (FIMI)	5
Japanese Albums (Oricon)	5
New Zealand Albums (RMNZ)	1
Norwegian Albums (VG-lista)	1
Portuguese Albums (AFP)	10
Scottish Albums (Official Charts)	9
Spanish Albums (PROMUSICAE)	1
Swedish Albums (Sverigetopplistan)	3
Taiwanese Albums (IFPI)	2
Swiss Albums (Schweizer Hitparade)	2
UK Albums (Official Charts)	2
US Billboard 200	1

=== Year-end charts ===
1999 year-end chart performance for Ricky Martin
Chart (1999)	Position
Australian Albums (ARIA)	6
Austrian Albums (Ö3 Austria)	17
Belgian Albums (Ultratop Flanders)	73
Belgian Albums (Ultratop Wallonia)	71
Canada Top Albums/CDs (RPM)	4
Danish Albums (Hitlisten)	44
Dutch Albums (MegaCharts)	56
German Albums (Offizielle Top 100)	25
Japanese Albums (Oricon)	39
New Zealand (Recorded Music NZ)	2
Norwegian End of School Period Albums (VG-lista)	1
Spanish Albums (PROMUSICAE)	13
Swiss Albums (Schweizer Hitparade)	14
UK Albums (OCC)	35
US Billboard 200	5

2000 year-end chart performance for Ricky Martin
Chart (2000)	Position
Australian Albums (ARIA)	72
Canadian Albums (Nielsen SoundScan)	68
Danish Albums (Hitlisten)	66
Finnish Foreign Albums (Suomen virallinen lista)	41
German Albums (Offizielle Top 100)	84
New Zealand (Recorded Music NZ)	46
South Korean International Albums (MIAK)	4
US Billboard 200	42

=== Decade-end charts ===
1990s decade-end chart performance for Ricky Martin
Chart (1990–1999)	Position
US Billboard 200	48

== Certifications and sales ==
Certifications and sales for Ricky Martin
Region	Certification	Certified units/sales
Argentina (CAPIF)	Platinum	60,000^{^}
Australia (ARIA)	3× Platinum	210,000^{^}
Austria (IFPI Austria)	Gold	25,000^{*}
Brazil (Pro-Música Brasil)	Gold	100,000^{*}
Canada (Music Canada)	Diamond	1,000,000^{^}
Denmark	—	18,315
Finland (Musiikkituottajat)	Gold	39,664
France (SNEP)	Gold	100,000^{*}
Germany (BVMI)	Gold	250,000^{^}
Italy	—	270,000
Japan (RIAJ)	Million	1,000,000^{^}
Mexico (AMPROFON)	Platinum+Gold	225,000^{^}
Netherlands (NVPI)	Platinum	100,000^{^}
New Zealand (RMNZ)	8× Platinum	120,000^{^}
Norway (IFPI Norway)	Platinum	110,000
Philippines (PARI)	Gold	20,000^{*}
Poland (ZPAV)	Platinum	100,000^{*}
Singapore	—	15,000
South Korea (RIAK)	—	260,220
Spain (Promusicae)	3× Platinum	300,000^{^}
Sweden (GLF)	Platinum	80,000^{^}
Switzerland (IFPI Switzerland)	Platinum	50,000^{^}
United Kingdom (BPI)	Platinum	475,000
United States (RIAA)	7× Platinum	7,945,000 (Note: As of January 2011, Ricky Martin has sold 6,958,000 copies in the United States according to Nielsen SoundScan, with an additional 987,000 sold at BMG Music Clubs. Nielsen SoundScan does not count copies sold through clubs like the BMG Music Service, which were significantly popular in the 1990s.)
Summaries
Europe (IFPI)	2× Platinum	2,000,000^{*}
^{*} Sales figures based on certification alone.^{^} Shipments figures based on certification alone.

== Release history ==
Release dates and formats for Ricky Martin
Region	Date	Format(s)	Label(s)	Ref.
Taiwan	May 7, 1999	CD	Columbia Records	
Canada	May 11, 1999	CD	Columbia Records	
Hong Kong	May 11, 1999	CD	Columbia Records	
Japan	June 19, 1999	CD	Epic Records	

== See also ==
- 1990s in music
- 1999 in British music charts
- 1999 in music
- Latin music in Canada
- List of best-selling albums in Japan
- List of Billboard 200 number-one albums of 1999
- List of certified albums in Canada
- List of diamond-certified albums in Canada
- List of European number-one hits of 1999
- List of number-one albums from the 1990s (New Zealand)
- List of number-one albums in Australia during the 1990s
- List of number-one albums of 1999 (Canada)
- List of number-one albums of 1999 (Spain)
- List of top 25 albums for 1999 in Australia
- List of top 25 albums for 2000 in Australia
