= Shake Your Bon-Bon =

1999 single by Ricky Martin

Single by Ricky Martin

from the album Ricky Martin
- Released: October 12, 1999
- Recorded: Late 1998
- Genre: Pop; dance-pop; Latin pop; salsa-disco
- Length: 3:09
- Label: Columbia; C2
- Songwriters: Desmond Child; George Noriega; Draco Rosa
- Producers: George Noriega; Draco Rosa; Emilio Estefan

Ricky Martin singles chronology
"She's All I Ever Had" (1999)	"Shake Your Bon-Bon" (1999)	"Private Emotion" (2000)

Music video
- "Shake Your Bon-Bon" on YouTube

"Shake Your Bon-Bon" is the third single taken from the second self-titled album by Ricky Martin. It was released on October 12, 1999. It was later sent to radio stations in the United States on November 1, 1999. In this context, "bon-bon" is utilized as a colloquial euphemism for shaking one's buttocks.

The U.S. maxi-single includes "Almost a Love Song", which is an English version of Martin's song "Casi un Bolero", taken from the Grammy-winning album Vuelve. The Australian maxi-single also contains one new song, called "Ay, Ay, Ay It's Christmas".

== Music video ==
The music video aired in September 1999, and was directed once again by Wayne Isham. In the video, Martin performs in front of a crowd and dances on top of a taxi and fire truck. Ricky Martin received nominations for Best Male Video and Best Dance Video at the 2000 MTV Video Music Awards.

== Chart performance ==
"Shake Your Bon-Bon" peaked at number twenty-two on the Billboard Hot 100 in the United States.

It also peaked at number twelve in the United Kingdom and number twenty-seven in Australia, where it was certified Gold.

== Live performances ==
Martin delivered a performance of "Shake Your Bon-Bon" on the BBC's Top of the Pops on November 19, 1999.

== In popular culture ==
- The song was also used in two TV spots for the ninth-generation Toyota Corolla, with actor Brad Pitt driving the car (2001).
- William Hung recorded this song on his album Inspiration (2004).
- The lyrics "Shake your bon-bon, shake your—" are sung by a penguin in the animated film Happy Feet (2006).

== Formats and track listings ==
Australian CD maxi-single

1. "Shake Your Bon-Bon" – 3:12
2. "Shake Your Bon-Bon" (Eddie's Club Radio Edit) – 3:53
3. "Shake Your Bon-Bon" (Eddie's Rhythm Radio Mix) – 4:53
4. "Ay, Ay, Ay It's Christmas" – 3:03

European CD single

1. "Shake Your Bon-Bon" (Album Version) – 3:12
2. "Shake Your Bon-Bon" (Eddie's Rhythm Radio Mix) – 4:53

European 12" single

1. "Shake Your Bon-Bon" (Album Version) – 3:12
2. "Shake Your Bon-Bon" (Eddie's Rhythm Radio Mix) – 4:53
3. "Shake Your Bon-Bon" (Almighty Mix) – 7:21
4. "Shake Your Bon-Bon" (Eddie's Club Radio Edit) – 3:53

European 12" single

1. "Shake Your Bon-Bon" (Almighty Mix) – 7:21
2. "Shake Your Bon-Bon" (Eddie's Bon-Bon Club Mix) – 6:33
3. "Shake Your Bon-Bon" (Eddie's Club Radio Edit) – 3:53
4. "Shake Your Bon-Bon" (Album Version) – 3:12

Japanese CD maxi-single

1. "Shake Your Bon-Bon" – 3:12
2. "Shake Your Bon-Bon" (Eddie's Club Radio Edit) – 3:53
3. "Shake Your Bon-Bon" (Eddie's Rhythm Radio Mix) – 4:53
4. "Ay, Ay, Ay It's Christmas" – 3:03

Mexican promotional CD single

1. "Shake Your Bon-Bon" (Club Radio Edit) – 3:53
2. "Shake Your Bon-Bon" (Eddie's Bon-Bon Club Mix) – 6:33
3. "Shake Your Bon-Bon" (Rhythm T.V. Track) – 4:40
4. "Shake Your Bon-Bon" (Club T.V. Track) – 6:33
5. "Shake Your Bon-Bon" (Rhythm Radio Mix) – 4:53
6. "Shake Your Bon-Bon" (Eddie's Instrumental Mix) – 6:33
7. "Shake Your Bon-Bon" (Album Version) – 3:12

UK CD maxi-single #1

1. "Shake Your Bon-Bon" – 3:12
2. "Livin' la Vida Loca" (Trackmasters Remix) – 3:46
3. "María" (12" Club Mix) – 5:50

UK CD maxi-single #2

1. "Shake Your Bon-Bon" – 3:12
2. "She's All I Ever Had" – 4:55
3. "She's All I Ever Had" (Hex Hector Radio Mix) – 4:39

UK promotional 12" single

1. "Shake Your Bon-Bon" (Almighty Mix) – 7:21
2. "Shake Your Bon-Bon" (Almighty Dub) – 5:14

US CD single

1. "Shake Your Bon-Bon" (Album Version) – 3:12
2. "Almost a Love Song" ("Casi un Bolero") – 4:40

US CD maxi-single

1. "Shake Your Bon-Bon" (Album Version) – 3:12
2. "Shake Your Bon-Bon" (Eddie Arroyo Club Mix) – 6:33
3. "Shake Your Bon-Bon" (Fernando Garibay Club Mix) – 5:58
4. "She's All I Ever Had" (Hex Hector 12" Club Mix) – 8:31
5. "Almost a Love Song" ("Casi un Bolero") – 4:40

US 12" single

1. "Shake Your Bon-Bon" (Eddie Arroyo Club Mix) – 6:33
2. "Shake Your Bon-Bon" (Eddie Arroyo Instrumental Club Mix) – 6:33
3. "Shake Your Bon-Bon" (Album Version) – 3:12
4. "Shake Your Bon-Bon" (Fernando Garibay Club Mix) – 5:58
5. "She's All I Ever Had" (Hex Hector 12" Club Mix) – 8:31

== Charts ==
=== Weekly charts ===
Chart (1999–2000)	Peak position
Australia (ARIA)	27
Canada Top Singles (RPM)	9
Canada Adult Contemporary (RPM)	14
Canada CHR (Nielsen BDS)	8
Czech Republic (IFPI)	24
Europe (European Hot 100 Singles)	45
Finland (Suomen virallinen lista)	6
Ireland (IRMA)	22
Italy Airplay (Music & Media)	3
Netherlands (Dutch Top 40)	36
Netherlands (Single Top 100)	45
New Zealand (Recorded Music NZ)	10
Scottish Singles Sales (Official Charts)	14
Spain (Promusicae)	11
UK Singles (Official Charts)	12
US Billboard Hot 100	22
US Hot Dance Maxi-Singles Sales (Billboard)	2
US Hot Latin Songs (Billboard)	14
US Pop Airplay (Billboard)	11
US Rhythmic Airplay (Billboard)	25
US Top 40 Tracks (Billboard)	18

=== Year-end charts ===
Chart (1999)	Position
Australia (ARIA)	89

Chart (2000)	Position
US Hot Dance Maxi-Singles Sales (Billboard)	23
US Mainstream Top 40 (Billboard)	75

== Certifications and sales ==
Region	Certification	Certified units/sales
Australia (ARIA)	Gold	35,000^{^}
^{^} Shipments figures based on certification alone.
