= Ricky Martin singles discography =

Singles discography of Puerto Rican singer-songwriter

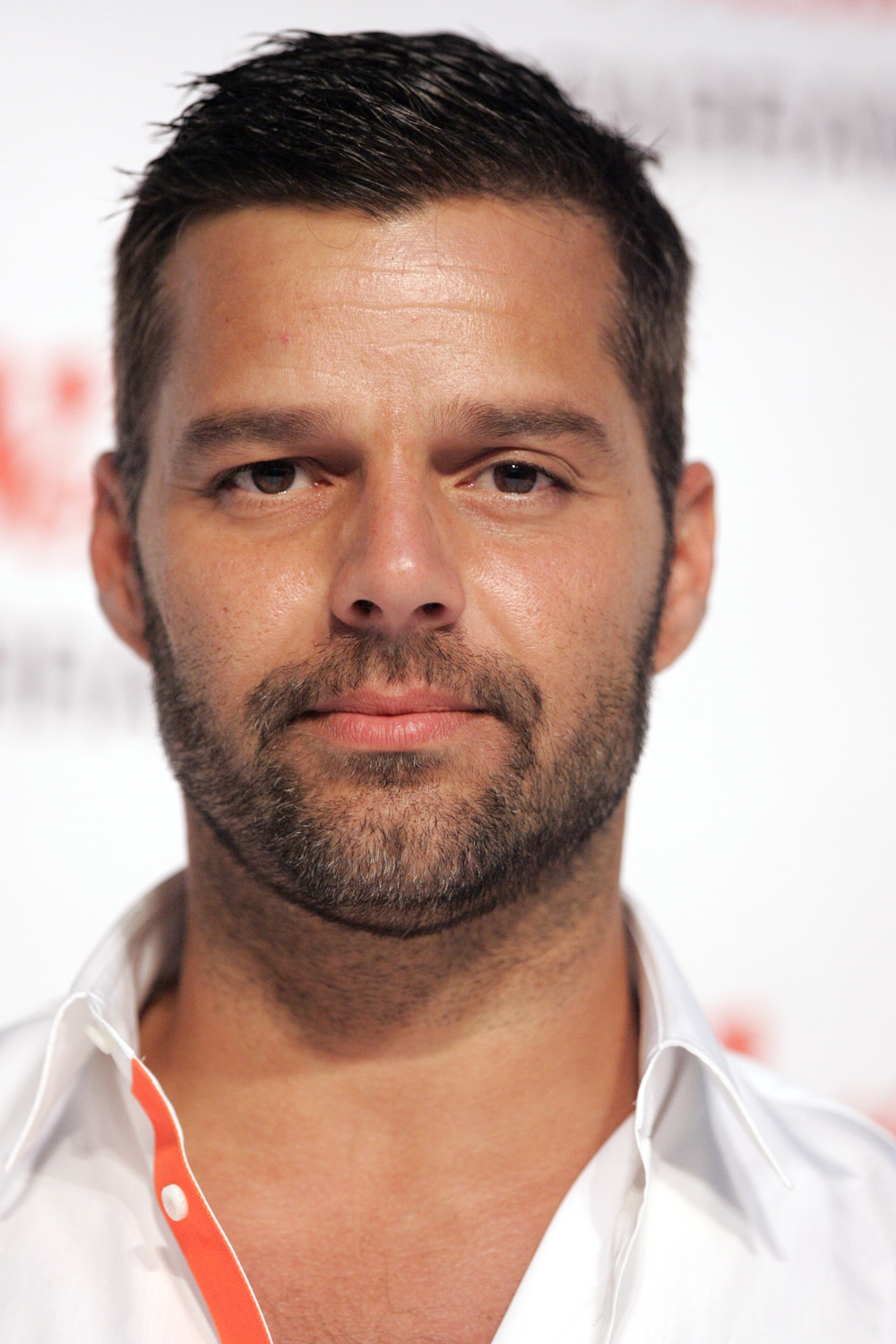
- Ricky Martin at Westfield Parramatta, Sydney, Australia in 2013
- As lead artist: 67
- As featured artist: 7
- Promotional singles: 7
- Other charted songs: 6

Puerto Rican singer-songwriter Ricky Martin has released 67 singles as lead artist, seven singles as a featured artist, seven promotional singles, and six charted non-single songs. He has amassed 50 chart entries on the US Billboard Hot Latin Songs chart, including eleven number ones and 27 top tens. Martin made his chart debut on the US Hot Latin Songs with "Fuego Contra Fuego", the lead single from his 1991 self-titled debut album. It peaked at number three on the chart.

Martin's third Spanish-language album, A Medio Vivir (1995) included his international breakthrough single, "María". The song became his first entry on the US Billboard Hot 100, his first top-10 hit on the UK Singles Chart, and topped the chart in France for nine consecutive weeks, being certified Diamond after selling 1.4 million copies. The album also spawned top-five single "Te Extraño, Te Olvido, Te Amo". His fourth studio album, Vuelve (1998) spawned two number-one hits on the US Hot Latin Songs chart—"Vuelve" and "Perdido Sin Ti"—the former topped the charts in eight Latin American countries. "La Copa de la Vida" was released as the second single from the album, and became the official song of the 1998 FIFA World Cup in France. It hit the charts in more than 60 countries, and topped the charts of 30 countries, making it one of Martin's most successful songs.

Martin's first English-language album, Ricky Martin was released in 1999 and included his biggest hit "Livin' la Vida Loca". It topped the US Billboard Hot 100 for five consecutive weeks and was certified Platinum by the Recording Industry Association of America (RIAA) and double-platinum by the British Phonographic Industry. The second single from the album, "She's All I Ever Had reached number two on The US Hot 100. His second English-language album Sound Loaded (2000) spawned two international top-five singles "She Bangs" and "Nobody Wants to Be Lonely". They were both certified silver by the British Phonographic Industry (BPI) and their Spanish versions topped the US Hot Latin Songs chart. The lead single from his next Spanish-language album Almas del Silencio (2003), "Tal Vez" debuted at number one on the US Hot Latin Songs and spent eleven weeks at the top. "Jaleo" and "Y Todo Queda en Nada" from the same album, also reached the summit of the chart. Martin's 2006 live album, MTV Unplugged included two Latin American hit songs, "Tu Recuerdo" and "Pégate", which received quadruple platinum in Mexico. In 2007, Martin recorded a duet with Eros Ramazzotti, "Non siamo soli", that topped the Italian chart for eleven consecutive weeks.

In 2010, Martin released "The Best Thing About Me Is You" as the lead single from Música + Alma + Sexo (2011). It topped the US Hot Latin Songs chart and made Martin the first and only artist in history with Spanish-language entries in three decades. In 2014, "Adiós" was released as the first single from Martin's 2015 album, A Quien Quiera Escuchar. It was successful in Latin America, topping the charts in Colombia and Mexico, where it was also certified Gold. The second single, "Disparo al Corazón" received further success. The most successful single from the album was "La Mordidita", which reached number one on the US Latin Airplay, Latin Pop Airplay and topped the charts Latin America. In 2020, he released his debut Extended play, Pausa. The second single from the EP, "Tiburones" became a hit in Latin America. It peaked in the top 10 of ten Latin American countries, reaching number one in Puerto Rico for three consecutive weeks and becoming the first solo song ever to top Puerto Rico Year-End chart. Additionally, it became Martin's 49th entry on US Hot Latin Songs chart, making him the first and only artist in history to enter the chart in five different decades.

Besides material for his albums, Martin has recorded several collaborations, including successful hits in Spanish-speaking markets "Adrenalina", "Vente Pa' Ca", "Fiebre", "No Se Me Quita", and "Canción Bonita". In 2015, he released "Mr. Put It Down" (featuring Pitbull), which became Martin's first single to top the US Dance Club Songs chart. Martin earned sixteen number-one singles on the US Latin Airplay chart and is the second artist with most number-ones on this chart. On Latin Pop Airplay in the US, Martin holds the record for the most top twenty singles on this chart (fifty).

== As lead artist ==
=== 1990s ===
List of singles as lead artist, with selected chart positions and certifications, showing year released and album name
Year	Title	Peak chart positions										Certifications	Album
Year	Title	US	US Latin	US Latin Pop	AUS	FRA	GER	SPA	SWE	SWI	UK	Certifications	Album
1991	"Fuego Contra Fuego"	—	3	—	—	—	—	—	—	—	—		Ricky Martin
1992	"El Amor de Mi Vida"	—	8	—	—	—	—	—	—	—	—		Ricky Martin
1992	"Vuelo"	—	11	—	—	—	—	—	—	—	—		Ricky Martin
1992	"Dime Que Me Quieres"	—	—	—	—	—	—	—	—	—	—		Ricky Martin
1992	"Susana"	—	—	—	—	—	—	—	—	—	—		Ricky Martin
1993	"Todo Es Vida" (with Jessica Cristina)	—	14	—	—	—	—	—	—	—	—		Aprendiendo a Querer
1993	"Me Amaras"	—	6	—	—	—	—	—	—	—	—		Me Amaras
1993	"Que Día Es Hoy"	—	26	—	—	—	—	—	—	—	—		Me Amaras
1994	"Entre el Amor y los Halagos"	—	12	—	—	—	—	—	—	—	—		Me Amaras
1994	"No Me Pidas Mas"	—	—	—	—	—	—	—	—	—	—		Me Amaras
1995	"Te Extraño, Te Olvido, Te Amo"	—	9	2	—	4	—	— (Note: Without physical release, "Te Extraño, Te Olvido, Te Amo" was ineligible to chart in Spain, but it peaked at number 2 on the Top 40 Radio chart.)	—	19	—	SNEP: Gold	A Medio Vivir
1995	"María"	88	6	2	1 (Note: "María" charted as a double A-side single with "The Cup of Life" in Australia.)	1	3	11	3	3	6	ARIA: Platinum; BVMI: Gold; GLF: Gold; IFPI SWI: Gold; SNEP: Diamond	A Medio Vivir
1996	"A Medio Vivir"	—	36	8	—	—	—	— (Note: Without physical release, "A Medio Vivir" was ineligible to chart in Spain, but it peaked at number 34 on the Top 40 Radio chart.)	—	—	—		A Medio Vivir
1996	"Fuego de Noche, Nieve de Día"	—	—	12	—	—	—	—	—	—	—		A Medio Vivir
1996	"Como Decirte Adiós"	—	—	17	—	—	—	—	—	—	—		A Medio Vivir
1996	"Bombón de Azúcar"	—	—	12	—	—	—	— (Note: Without physical release, "Bombón de Azúcar" was ineligible to chart in Spain, but it peaked at number 16 on the Top 40 Radio chart.)	—	—	—		A Medio Vivir
1996	"Diana" (with Paul Anka)	—	24	12	—	—	—	—	—	—	—		Amigos
1997	"Volveras"	—	6	2	—	48	—	— (Note: Without physical release, "Volveras" was ineligible to chart in Spain, but it peaked at number 20 on the Top 40 Radio chart.)	—	—	—		A Medio Vivir
1997	"Nada es Imposible"	—	23	6	—	—	—	—	—	—	—		A Medio Vivir
1997	"No Importa la Distancia"	—	—	10	—	—	—	—	—	—	—		Hercules Soundtrack
1997	"Corazón" (Note: "Corazón" was released exclusively in Finland, where it peaked at number 20.)	—	—	—	—	—	—	—	—	—	—		A Medio Vivir
1998	"Vuelve"	—	1	1	—	—	—	—	—	—	—		Vuelve
1998	"La Copa de la Vida" / "The Cup of Life"	45	2	2	1 (Note: "The Cup of Life" charted as a double A-side single with "María" in Australia.)	1	1	1	1	1	29	ARIA: Platinum; BVMI: Gold; GLF: Platinum; IFPI SWI: Gold; SNEP: Platinum	Vuelve
1998	"La Bomba"	—	27	11	27	45	90	5	31	—	—		Vuelve
1998	"Perdido Sin Ti"	—	1	1	—	—	—	— (Note: Without physical release, "Perdido Sin Ti" was ineligible to chart in Spain, but it peaked at number 18 on the Top 40 Radio chart.)	—	—	—		Vuelve
1998	"Por Arriba, Por Abajo"	—	33	11	—	—	—	13	—	—	—		Vuelve
1998	"Casi un Bolero"	—	—	—	—	—	—	— (Note: Without physical release, "Casi un Bolero" was ineligible to chart in Spain, but it peaked at number 7 on the Top 40 Radio chart.)	—	—	—		Vuelve
1999	"Livin' la Vida Loca"	1	1	1	4	7	6	2	4	3	1	ARIA: 2× Platinum; BPI: Platinum; BVMI: Gold; FIMI: Gold; GLF: Gold; PROMUSICAE: Gold; RIAA: Platinum; SNEP: Silver	Ricky Martin
1999	"She's All I Ever Had" / "Bella"	2	1	1	28	—	18	— (Note: Without physical release, "Bella" was ineligible to chart in Spain, but it peaked at number 13 on the Top 40 Radio chart.)	21	34	—	ARIA: Gold; RIAA: Gold	Ricky Martin
1999	"Shake Your Bon-Bon"	22	14	8	27	—	—	11	—	—	12	ARIA: Gold	Ricky Martin
"—" denotes a title that did not chart, or was not released in that territory

=== 2000s ===
List of singles as lead artist, with selected chart positions and certifications, showing year released and album name
Year	Title	Peak chart positions										Certifications	Album
Year	Title	US	US Latin	US Latin Pop	AUS	FRA	GER	SPA	SWE	SWI	UK	Certifications	Album
2000	"Private Emotion" (featuring Meja)	67	—	28	59	11	21	— (Note: Without physical release, "Private Emotion" was ineligible to chart in Spain, but it peaked at number 25 on the Top 40 Radio chart.)	8	9	9	GLF: Gold	Ricky Martin
2000	"She Bangs"	12	1	2	3	36	34	2	1	7	3	ARIA: Platinum; BPI: Silver; GLF: Gold	Sound Loaded
2001	"Nobody Wants to Be Lonely" (with Christina Aguilera) / "Sólo Quiero Amarte"	13	1	1	8	28	5	2	3	2	4	ARIA: Gold; BPI: Silver; GLF: Gold; IFPI SWI: Gold	Sound Loaded
2001	"Loaded" / "Dame Más"	97	—	—	66	—	74	18	14	87	19		Sound Loaded
2001	"Amor"	—	—	—	—	—	—	—	—	82	—		The Best of Ricky Martin
2002	"Come to Me" (Note: "Come to Me" was released exclusively in the Netherlands, where it peaked at number 92.)	—	—	—	—	—	—	—	—	—	—		The Best of Ricky Martin
2003	"Relight My Fire" (featuring Loleatta Holloway) (Note: "Relight My Fire" was released exclusively to US clubs and peaked at number 5 on the US Dance Club Songs.)	—	—	—	—	—	—	—	—	—	—		Non-album single
2003	"Tal Vez"	74	1	1	—	—	—	—	—	—	—		Almas del Silencio
2003	"Jaleo"	— (Note: "Jaleo" did not enter the Billboard Hot 100, but peaked at number 22 on the Bubbling Under Hot 100 Singles chart.)	1	2	23	—	45	1	10	22	—		Almas del Silencio
2003	"Asignatura Pendiente"	—	5	4	—	—	—	—	—	—	—		Almas del Silencio
2003	"Juramento"	—	—	—	—	—	92	11	—	57	—		Almas del Silencio
2003	"Y Todo Queda en Nada"	— (Note: "Y Todo Queda en Nada" did not enter the Billboard Hot 100, but peaked at number 9 on the Bubbling Under Hot 100 Singles chart.)	1	2	—	—	—	—	—	—	—		Almas del Silencio
2005	"I Don't Care" (featuring Fat Joe and Amerie) / "Qué Mas Da" (featuring Fat Joe and Debi Nova)	65	7	11	25	16	21	—	31	20	11		Life
2005	"Drop It on Me" (featuring Daddy Yankee)	— (Note: "Drop It on Me" did not enter the Billboard Hot 100, but peaked at number 20 on the Bubbling Under Hot 100 Singles chart.)	—	23	—	—	—	—	—	—	—		Life
2006	"It's Alright" / "Déjate Llevar"	—	21	6	—	4	—	—	—	18	—	SNEP: Silver	Life
2006	"Tu Recuerdo" (featuring La Mari)	89	1	1	—	—	—	2	—	—	—	AMPROFON: 4× Platinum; PROMUSICAE: 5× Platinum	MTV Unplugged
2006	"Pégate"	—	11	9	—	—	—	13	—	—	—	AMPROFON: 4× Platinum	MTV Unplugged
2007	"Gracias por Pensar en Mi"	—	—	21	—	—	—	—	—	—	—	AMPROFON: 4× Platinum	MTV Unplugged
2007	"Con Tu Nombre"	—	47	15	—	—	—	—	—	—	—		MTV Unplugged
2007	"Non siamo soli" (with Eros Ramazzotti)/ "No Estamos Solos" (with Eros Ramazzotti)	—	21	5	—	—	32	2	—	3	—	PROMUSICAE: 4× Platinum	e^{2}
"—" denotes a title that did not chart, or was not released in that territory

=== 2010s ===
List of singles as lead artist, with selected chart positions and certifications, showing year released and album name
Year	Title	Peak chart positions										Certifications	Album
Year	Title	US	US Dance	US Latin	US Latin Pop	AUS	FRA	ITA	MEX	SPA	SWI	Certifications	Album
2010	"Lo Mejor de Mi Vida Eres Tú" (featuring Natalia Jiménez) / "The Best Thing About Me Is You" (featuring Joss Stone)	74	—	1	1	—	—	—	8	25	—	AMPROFON: Platinum	Música + Alma + Sexo
2011	"Más" / "Freak of Nature"	—	7	13	2	—	—	—	7	43	—	AMPROFON: Gold	Música + Alma + Sexo
2011	"Frío" (featuring Wisin & Yandel)	—	—	6	7	—	—	—	—	—			Música + Alma + Sexo
2011	"Samba" (with Claudia Leitte) (Note: "Samba" was released exclusively in Brazil.)	—	—	—	—	—	—	—	—	—	—		Música + Alma + Sexo (Fun Edition)
2013	"Come with Me"	—	4	— (Note: As an English song, "Come with Me" was ineligible to chart the Hot Latin Songs, but it peaked at number one on the Latin Airplay chart.)	5	3	—	92	19	9	—	AMPROFON: Gold; ARIA: Gold	Non-album single
2014	"Vida"	—	—	5	4	75	—	98	7	5	—	AMPROFON: Gold	One Love, One Rhythm
2014	"Adiós"	—	—	9	4	—	—	—	5	12	—	AMPROFON: Platinum+Gold; PROMUSICAE: Gold	A Quien Quiera Escuchar
2015	"Disparo al Corazón"	—	—	9	1	—	—	—	10	31	—	AMPROFON: Platinum	A Quien Quiera Escuchar
2015	"Mr. Put It Down" (featuring Pitbull)	—	1	—	—	91	—	—	—	—	—		Non-album single
2015	"La Mordidita" (featuring Yotuel)	—	—	6	1	—	159	68	48	3	—	AMPROFON: 4× Platinum+Gold; FIMI: Platinum; PROMUSICAE: 4× Platinum; RIAA: 15× Platinum (Latin)	A Quien Quiera Escuchar
2016	"Perdóname"	—	—	25	4	—	—	—	26	—	—	AMPROFON: Gold	A Quien Quiera Escuchar
2016	"Vente Pa' Ca" (featuring Maluma)	— (Note: "Vente Pa' Ca" did not enter the Billboard Hot 100, but peaked at number 25 on the Bubbling Under Hot 100 Singles chart.)	—	4	1	—	164	65	1	2	72	AMPROFON: Diamond+3× Platinum+Gold; FIMI: Platinum; IFPI SWI: Platinum; PROMUSICAE: 4× Platinum	ReVivo: Los Hits
2018	"Fiebre" (featuring Wisin & Yandel)	— (Note: "Fiebre" did not enter the Billboard Hot 100, but peaked at number 47 on the Radio Songs chart.)	—	17	3	—	—	—	6	24	69	AMPROFON: Platinum; PROMUSICAE: Gold; RIAA: Platinum (Latin)	ReVivo: Los Hits
2019	"Cántalo" (with Residente and Bad Bunny)	—	—	35	11	—	—	—	—	—	—	RIAA: Gold (Latin)	Pausa
"—" denotes a title that did not chart, or was not released in that territory

=== 2020s ===
List of singles as lead artist, with selected chart positions and certifications, showing year released and album name
Year	Title	Peak chart positions										Certifications	Album
Year	Title	PRI	ARG	CHL	ECU	MEX	PAN	SPA	URY	US Latin	US Latin Pop	Certifications	Album
2020	"Tiburones"	1	57	8	6	11	3	—	4	34	9	AMPROFON: Platinum	Pausa
2020	"Falta Amor" (with Sebastián Yatra)	— (Note: "Falta Amor" did not enter the Puerto Rico Top 20 General, but peaked at number 11 on the Puerto Rico Top 20 Pop chart.)	48	— (Note: "Falta Amor" did not enter the Paraguay Top 20 General, but peaked at number 8 on the Paraguay Top 20 Pop chart.)	4	47	— (Note: "Falta Amor" did not enter the Panama Top 20 General, but peaked at number 1 on the Panama Top 20 Pop chart.)	—	16	— (Note: "Falta Amor" did not enter the Hot Latin Songs, but it peaked at number seven on the Latin Digital Song Sales chart.)	19	RIAA: Platinum (Latin)	Non-album single
2021	"Canción Bonita" (with Carlos Vives)	1	25	1	1	11	1	41	1	23	5	AMPROFON: Gold; CFC: Platinum; PROMUSICAE: 2× Platinum; RIAA: 4× Platinum (Latin)	Cumbiana II
2021	"Qué Rico Fuera" (with Paloma Mami)	1	60	1	— (Note: "Qué Rico Fuera" did not enter the Ecuador Top 20 General, but peaked at number 10 on the Ecuador Top 20 Pop chart.)	28	— (Note: "Qué Rico Fuera" did not enter the Panama Top 20 General, but peaked at number 5 on the Panama Top 20 Pop chart.)	—	1	— (Note: "Qué Rico Fuera" did not enter the Hot Latin Songs, but it peaked at number eight on the Latin Digital Song Sales chart.)	7	RIAA: Gold (Latin)	Non-album single
2022	"Otra Noche en L.A."	— (Note: "Otra Noche en L.A." did not enter the Puerto Rico Top 20 General, but peaked at number 4 on the Puerto Rico Top 20 Pop chart.)	67	— (Note: "Otra Noche en L.A." did not enter the Chile Top 20 General, but peaked at number 10 on the Chile Top 20 Pop chart.)	18	6	17	—	1	— (Note: "Otra Noche en L.A." did not enter the Hot Latin Songs, but it peaked at number 10 on the Latin Digital Song Sales chart.)	16		Play
2022	"A Veces Bien y a Veces Mal" (with Reik)	8	—	—	—	9	—	—	—	50	1		Play
2023	"Fuego de Noche, Nieve de Día" (with Christian Nodal)	—	—	—	—	—	—	—	—	—	—		ReVivo
2025	"A Medio Vivir" (with Carín León)	—	—	—	—	—	—	—	—	—	—		ReVivo
2025	"Comin' Home Baby"	—	—	—	—	—	—	—	—	—	—		Palm Royale
2026	"Lluvia" (with Arcángel)	—	—	—	—	—	—	—	—	—	—		LA 8VA MARAVILLA
2026	"Vuelve" (with Los Ángeles Azules and TINI)	—	—	—	—	—	—	—	—	—	—		ReVivo
2026	"Estranho" (with Luan Santana)	—	—	—	—	—	—	—	—	—	—		ReVivo
2026	"pikito pikito" (with Pedro Sampaio)	—	—	—	—	—	—	—	—	—	—		TBA
"—" denotes a title that did not chart, or was not released in that territory

== As featured artist ==
List of singles as featured artist, with selected chart positions and certifications, showing year released and album name
Year	Title	Peak chart positions										Certifications	Album
Year	Title	US	US Latin	US Latin Pop	ARG	FRA	ITA	MEX	SPA	SWI	UK	Certifications	Album
2012	"Sexy and I Know It" (Glee Cast featuring Ricky Martin)	81	—	—	—	—	—	—	—	—	—		Glee: The Music, The Complete Season Three
2012	"La Isla Bonita" (Glee Cast featuring Ricky Martin)	99	—	—	—	—	—	—	—	—	152		Glee: The Music, The Complete Season Three
2013	"Más y Más" (Draco Rosa featuring Ricky Martin)	—	27	9	—	—	—	—	—	—	—		Vida
2014	"Adrenalina" (Wisin featuring Ricky Martin and Jennifer Lopez)	94	2	2	—	122	52	4	3	57	—	AMPROFON: Platinum; FIMI: Gold; PROMUSICAE: 2× Platinum	El Regreso del Sobreviviente
2014	"Perdón" (Camila featuring Ricky Martin)	—	—	—	—	—	—	—	—	—	—		Elypse
2015	"Que Se Sienta El Deseo" (Wisin featuring Ricky Martin)	—	15	4	—	—	—	— (Note: "Que Se Sienta El Deseo" did not enter the Mexico Airplay, but peaked at number 35 on the Mexico Espanol Airplay chart.)	—	—	—		Los Vaqueros 3: La Trilogía
2019	"No Se Me Quita" (Maluma featuring Ricky Martin)	—	— (Note: "No Se Me Quita" did not enter the Hot Latin Songs, but it peaked at number 19 on the Latin Digital Song Sales chart.)	—	26	—	—	1	—	—	—	AMPROFON: 4× Platinum+Gold; PROMUSICAE: Gold; RIAA: Platinum (Latin)	11:11
"—" denotes a title that did not chart, or was not released in that territory

== Promotional singles ==
List of promotional singles, with selected chart positions, showing year released and album name
Title	Year	Peak chart positions					Certifications	Album
Title	Year	US Latin	US Latin Pop	US Latin Pop Digital	PRI	HND Pop	Certifications	Album
"Juego de Ajedrez"	1992	—	—	—	—	—		Ricky Martin
"Ser Feliz"	1993	—	—	—	—	—		Ricky Martin
"Dónde Estarás"	1997	—	—	—	—	—		A Medio Vivir
"Corazonado"	1999	20	9	—	—	—		Vuelve
"Cambia la Piel"	2001	—	—	—	—	—		Sound Loaded
"Shine"	2011	—	—	—	—	—		Música + Alma + Sexo
"Recuerdo" (with Carla Morrison)	2020	—	12	15	9	12	AMPROFON: Platinum	Pausa
"Ácido Sabor"	2022	—	7	—	12	—		Play
"—" denotes a recording that did not chart or was not released in that territory.

== Charity songs ==
Year	Title	Peak chart positions				Album
Year	Title	US	US Latin	US Latin Pop	SPA	Album
1996	"Puedes Llegar" (Voces Unidas)	—	2	3	—	Voces Unidas
1999	"We are the World"	—	—	—	—	Pavarotti & Friends For Guatemala And Kosovo
2001	"El Ultimo Adios" (Various Artists)	—	—	30	—	El Ultimo Adios
2003	"What More Can I Give" (The All Stars)	—	—	—	—	Non-album singles
2010	"Somos El Mundo 25 Por Haiti" (Artists por Haiti)	— (Note: "Somos El Mundo 25 Por Haiti" did not enter the Billboard Hot 100, but peaked at number 15 on the Bubbling Under Hot 100 Singles chart.)	—	—	31	Non-album singles
"—" denotes a title that did not chart, or was not released in that territory

== Other charted songs ==
List of songs with selected chart positions, showing year released and album name
Year	Title	Peak chart positions					Album
Year	Title	SPA	US Pop Digital Song Sales	US Latin Digital Song Sales	US Latin Pop Digital Song Sales	US Latin Rhythm Airplay	Album
2008	"Bambú" (Miguel Bosé featuring Ricky Martin)	15	—	—	—	—	Papito
2012	"Bamboleo / Hero" (Glee Cast featuring Ricky Martin)	—	49	—	—	—	Glee: The Music, The Complete Season Three
2014	"Quimera" (Pablo Alborán featuring Ricky Martin)	30	—	—	—	—	Terral
2015	"Isla Bella"	—	—	42	16	—	A Quien Quiera Escuchar
2016	"Haciendo Ruido" (Pitbull featuring Ricky Martin)	—	—	—	—	21	Dale
2020	"Simple"	—	—	—	11	—	Pausa
"—" denotes a title that did not chart, or was not released in that territory

== Guest appearances ==
List of non-single guest appearances, with other performing artists, showing year released and album name
Title	Year	Other artist(s)	Album
"Todos Mis Caminos Van a Ti"	1991	Sasha Sokol	Siento
"Que Hermoso Niño"	1994	None	Navidad En Las Americas
"Ahora Seremos Felices"	1998	None	Romance Del Cumbanchero - La Musica De Rafael Hernandez
"El Buen Borincano"	1998	None	Romance Del Cumbanchero - La Musica De Rafael Hernandez
"Ask for More / "Siempre Pide Más"	1999	Janet Jackson	None
"Mamma"	1999	Luciano Pavarotti	Pavarotti & Friends For Guatemala And Kosovo
"Ay, Ay, Ay It's Christmas"	2000	Rosie O'Donnell	Another Rosie Christmas
"Amare Ey Man Galie"	2002	None	Voices of Hope: Sabera Foundation
"Química Ideal"	2008	Ednita Nazario	Real... En Vivo
"Amigos del Mundo (Happy Christmas)"	2008	Pedrito Fernández, Tatiana	Top Latino Navidad
"Daytripper"	2010	None	Hey Jude: Tributo a Los Beatles
"Hey Jude"	2010	Chayanne, Yuri, Magneto, La Mafia, Willy Chirino, Ilan Chester, Lourdes Robles	Hey Jude: Tributo a Los Beatles
"El Abrigo"	2012	Tommy Torres, Juanes, Alejandro Sanz	12 Historias
"Haciendo Ruido"	2015	Pitbull	Dale
"Last Christmas"	2015	Helene Fischer	Weihnachten
"Borrow Indefinitely"	2020	None	Jingle Jangle: A Christmas Journey

== Production and songwriting credits ==
List of Martin's credits on songs by other artists
Song	Year	Artist(s)	Album	Credit(s)
"Ya"	2012	La Vanidosa	Es Otra Cosa	Composer
"Quisiera"	2016	CNCO	Primera Cita	Misc. producer
"Tan Fácil"	2016	CNCO	Primera Cita	Misc. producer
"Reggaetón Lento (Bailemos)"	2016	CNCO	Primera Cita	Misc. producer
"Primera Cita"	2016	CNCO	Primera Cita	Misc. producer
"Para Enamorarte"	2016	CNCO	Primera Cita	Misc. producer
"No Entiendo"	2016	CNCO	Primera Cita	Misc. producer
"Devuélveme Mi Corazón"	2016	CNCO	Primera Cita	Misc. producer
"Cometa"	2016	CNCO	Primera Cita	Misc. producer
"Volverte a Ver"	2016	CNCO	Primera Cita	Misc. producer
"Tu Luz"	2016	CNCO	Primera Cita	Misc. producer
"Cien"	2016	CNCO	Primera Cita	Misc. producer
"Más Allá"	2016	CNCO	Primera Cita	Misc. producer
"Quisiera" (Ballad Version)	2016	CNCO	Primera Cita	Misc. producer
"Tan Fácil" (Urban Remix)	2016	CNCO	Primera Cita	Misc. producer
"Caro"	2018	Bad Bunny	X 100Pre	Composer
"Neverland"	2021	Withney Sambono	Non-album singles	Arranger, associated performer, recording arranger, work arranger

== See also ==
- Ricky Martin albums discography
