= Vuelve (album) =

Studio album by Ricky Martin
- Released: February 17, 1998
- Recorded: 1997
- Studio: Various (see recording locations)
- Genres: Latin dance; pop
- Length: 62:04
- Language: Spanish
- Labels: Sony Discos; Columbia
- Producers: KC Porter; Robi Draco Rosa; Desmond Child

Ricky Martin chronology
A Medio Vivir (1995)	Vuelve (1998)	Ricky Martin (1999)

Singles from Vuelve
- 1. "Vuelve" Released: January 26, 1998; 2. "La Copa de la Vida" Released: March 9, 1998; 3. "La Bomba" Released: June 16, 1998; 4. "Perdido Sin Ti" Released: August 18, 1998; 5. "Por Arriba, Por Abajo" Released: November 3, 1998; 6. "Casi un Bolero" Released: December 21, 1998

Vuelve (transl. Come Back) is the fourth studio album by Puerto Rican singer Ricky Martin. Sony Discos and Columbia Records released it on February 17, 1998. Martin worked with producers KC Porter, Robi Draco Rosa, and Desmond Child to create the album. Following the worldwide success of the song "María" from his previous album, A Medio Vivir (transl. Half Alive) (1995), Martin returned to the studio and began recording material while on tour. Vuelve is a Latin record with Latin dance numbers and pop ballads. "María" caught the attention of FIFA, who asked Martin to write an anthem for the 1998 FIFA World Cup being held in France. Martin subsequently recorded "La Copa de la Vida", composed by Porter, Rosa, and Desmond Child for the World Cup.

Critics' reviews of the album were generally positive; they praised its uptempo tracks and its production, though some criticized it for containing too many ballads. Martin received several accolades, including the Best Latin Pop Performance at the 41st Annual Grammy Awards in 1999. Vuelve debuted at number one on the US Billboard Top Latin Albums chart and peaked at number forty on the Billboard 200. Martin's performance of "La Copa de la Vida" on the Grammy Awards show was credited for boosting the album's sales. Certified platinum by the Recording Industry Association of America (RIAA), it sold more than 888,000 copies in the United States, standing as the 10th best-selling Latin album in the country. Vuelve reached number one in Norway, Portugal, and Spain, as well as the top 10 in seven other countries, including Australia and Italy. As of 2008, the album had sold over six million copies worldwide.

Vuelve spawned six singles: its title track, "Vuelve", "La Copa de la Vida", "La Bomba", "Perdido Sin Ti", "Por Arriba, Por Abajo", and "Casi un Bolero". "Vuelve" and "Perdido Sin Ti" both reached number one on the Billboard Hot Latin Songs in the US while "La Copa de la Vida" became an international hit in both Europe and South America. For promotion, Martin embarked on the worldwide Vuelve tour performing in Asia, Australia, Europe, Mexico, South America, and the United States.

== Background and recording ==
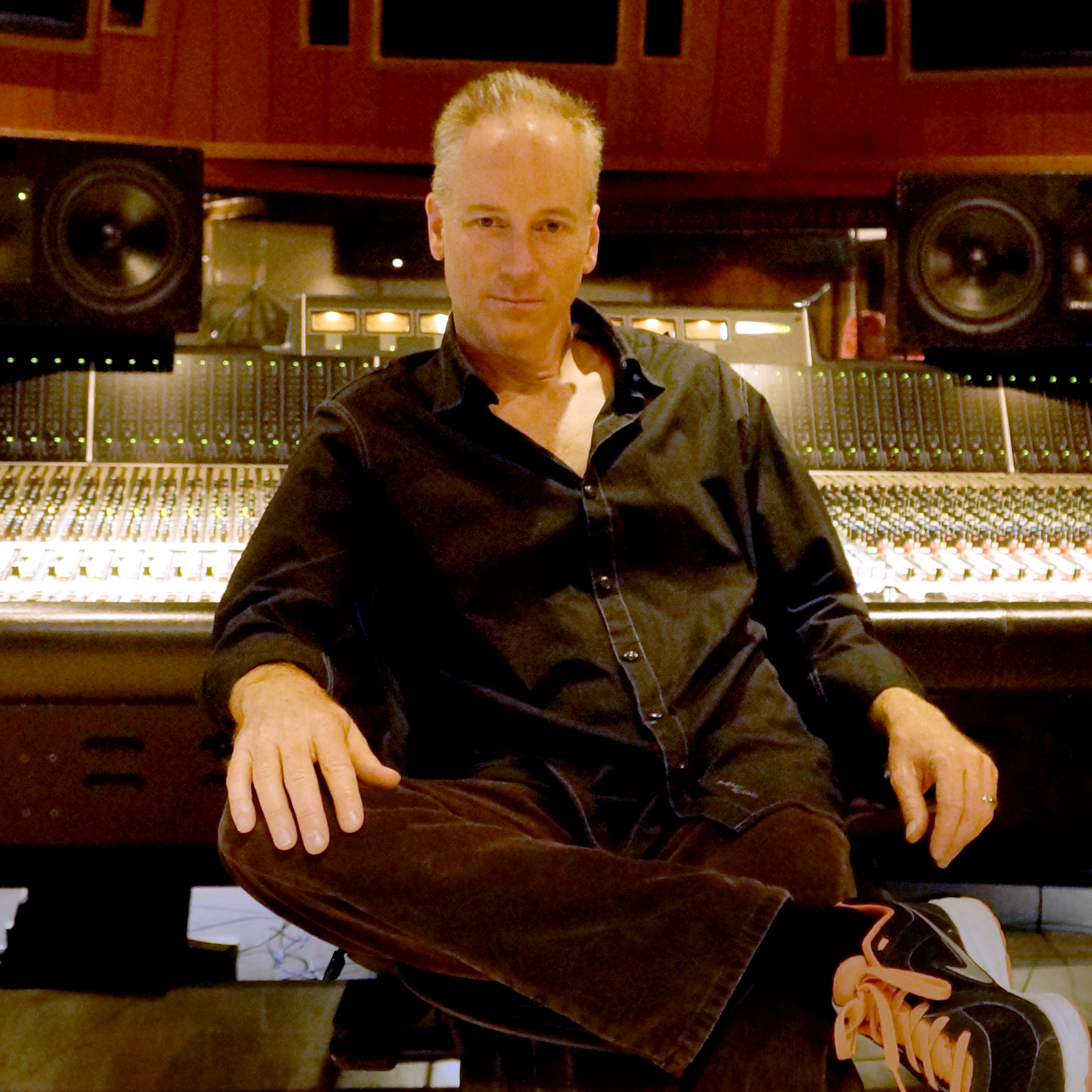
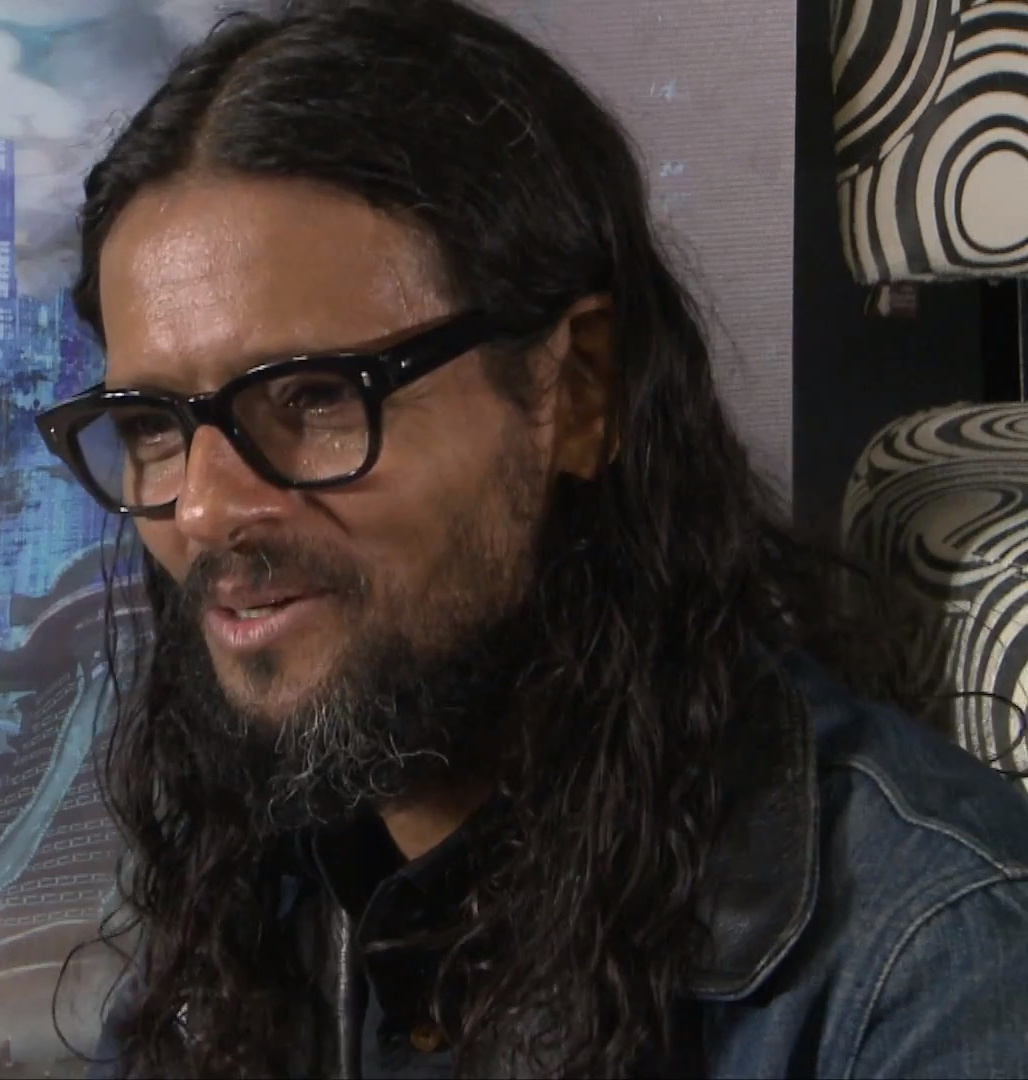
KC Porter (left) and Robi Draco Rosa (right) co-produced Vuelve and composed most of the tracks for the album.

In 1995, Ricky Martin released his third studio album, A Medio Vivir. On it, he shifted from his traditional ballad-style compositions to a riskier fusion of music focused on traditional Latin sounds, epitomized by the song "María". Taken aback by the starkly different musical style, his record label executives felt the song would ruin Martin's career. Despite this, "María" was chosen as the album's second single and became a breakthrough success, reaching number one in France, Spain, Germany, Belgium, Holland, Switzerland, Finland, Italy, Turkey, and the whole of South America. As of 2014, A Medio Vivir has sold over three million copies worldwide. "María" caught the attention of FIFA. They contacted Martin in the middle of his tour and asked him to write an anthem for the 1998 World Cup; Martin subsequently recorded "La Copa de la Vida" (transl. "The Cup of Life") composed by KC Porter, Desmond Child, and fellow ex-member of Menudo Robi Draco Rosa. According to the vice president of marketing at Sony Music Europe, Richard Ogden, FIFA chose Martin because he "exemplified all of the ideals that organizers of the famed football (soccer) tournament wanted us to try to embody in music".

While on tour in 1997, Martin returned to the studio and began recording material for his fourth studio album. He said the experience of touring and recording at the same time was "brutal and incredibly intense". On December 7, 1997, Martin confirmed he was completing his next project and that the album would be released in February of the following year. He worked on the album with producers Porter and Rosa, and recorded it in studios across the United States, Puerto Rico, and Spain. The album's title, Vuelve, was announced on January 25, 1998. In an interview with CNN en Español, he emphasized it was going to "reaffirm the internationalization of my career and I know that it will help me a lot to destroy the stereotypes that may exist with my culture".

== Composition and lyrics ==
"Hagamos el Amor"
A 19-second sample of "Hagamos el Amor", one of the album's ballads. The Los Angeles Times critic Ernesto Lechner noted its "sly use of the orchestral passages".

"Lola, Lola"
A 28-second sample of "Lola, Lola", one of the record's uptempo tracks. Richard Torres of Newsday described the song as an "insinuating mix of twanging guitars, blaring horns and flamenco fury".

Vuelve is a Latin album composed of 14 songs, consisting mainly of "red-hot" Latin dance numbers and "melodramatic" pop ballads. The uptempo tracks "Lola, Lola" and "La Bomba" (transl. "The Bomb") mix the musical styles of salsa and rumba with jazz, rock, and pop. On "Por Arriba, Por Abajo" (transl. "Over the Top, Through the Bottom"), Martin asks the saints to have his love interest dance with him. It is a samba-influenced track, accompanied by African chants and "wicked horn blasts". "La Bomba" is influenced by the Puerto Rican dance of the same name; its lyrics discuss how the singer gets drunk from the rhythm. The song features Cuban musician Paquito Hechavarría on the piano. "Lola, Lola" is an uptempo number, on which the singer sings about the women he desires. The title track, penned by Venezuelan singer-songwriter Franco De Vita, is a "sultry" love song with a gospel chorus and includes the narrator pleading with Martin's love interest to return as she gives meaning to his life. In a 2007 interview with Estudio Billboard, De Vita recalled he had been writing the song for 10 years when Martin asked him to compose a track for the album. "Corazonado" (transl. "Heartful") and "Perdido Sin Ti" (transl. "Lost Without You") are ballads with "aching, slower-paced narratives", with the latter track being a "bedroom staple with a dreamy hook and a simmering feel". "Casi un Bolero" (transl. "Almost [Like] a Bolero") is a bolero about an artist "[o]bsessed with his own broken heart and threatening to die if his lover does not return". An instrumental version of the song was recorded for Vuelve, which serves as the closing track.

"Hagamos el Amor" (transl. "Let's Make Love") is an orchestrated ballad with a string arrangement and a "brooding" piano". "La Copa de la Vida", the official theme for the 1998 World Cup, is a samba song featuring various instruments including bells, whistles, horns, trumpets, and percussion. On the song, Martin declares life is a competition where one has to "dream to be the champ". "Así es la Vida" (transl. "That's Life") is as "openly pop as it is romantic" and includes a chorus in the background. Martin recorded two cover songs in Spanish for the album: "Marcia Baila" (transl. Marcía Dances) and "Gracias por Pensar en Mi" (transl. "Thank You for Thinking of Me"). Les Rita Mitsouko originally performed "Marcia Baila", and was a success in France in the 1980s. "Gracias por Pensar en Mi" is an adaptation of "A Via Lactea" (transl. "To the Milky Way") by Legião Urbana from their album A Tempestade ou O Livro dos Dias (1996). Renato Russo had written it months before he died of AIDS. The narrator for "Gracias por Pensar en Mi is a person close to dying. Vuelve also features the song "No Importa la Distancia", the Spanish-language version of "Go the Distance" by Michael Bolton from the movie Hercules. It was released as a single for the Latin American edition of the Hercules soundtrack in 1997 and peaked at number 10 on the Latin Pop Airplay chart.

== Singles ==
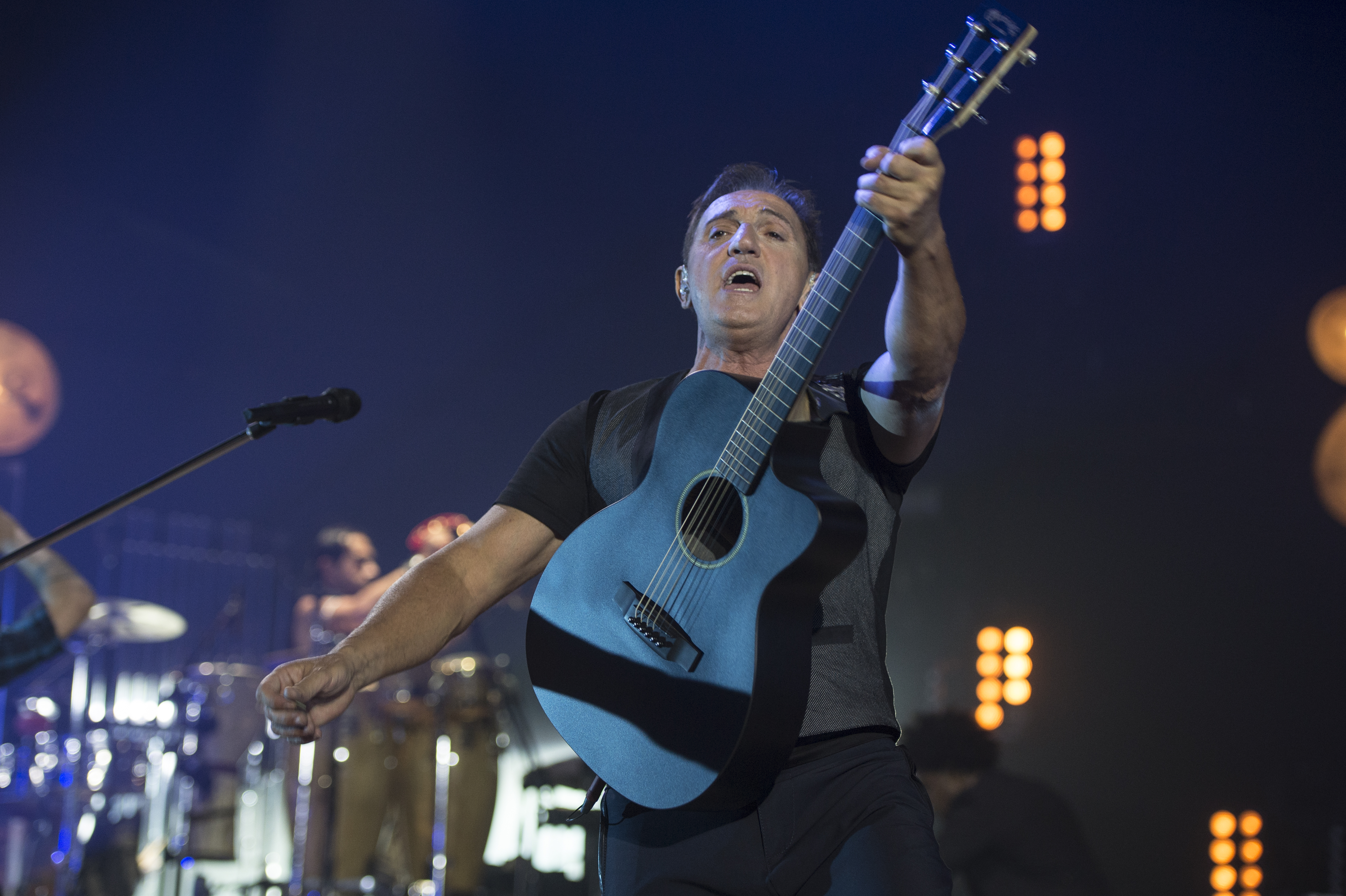
"Vuelve", written by Venezuelan singer-songwriter Franco De Vita, was released as the lead single for the album and became Martin's first song to reach number one the Billboard Hot Latin Songs chart.

The title track was released as the album's first single on January 26, 1998. It was his first number-one song on the Billboard Hot Latin Songs chart in the US. The song became a top five hit in Guatemala, El Salvador, and Panama, and on Mexico's ballads chart. It reached number one in Costa Rica, El Salvador, Guatemala, Honduras, Nicaragua, Peru, and Venezuela. The track was the theme song for the Mexican telenovela Sin ti (1997). "La Copa de la Vida" was released as the second single on March 9, 1998. The song grew to be an international success, appearing on the charts in more than 60 countries, and reaching number one in 30 countries, including Australia, Belgium (Wallonia), Costa Rica, El Salvador, France, Germany, Italy, Panama, Spain, Nicaragua, Sweden, Switzerland, Venezuela, as well as topping the European Hot 100 Singles chart. It peaked at number two in Norway, as well as on the ballads chart in Mexico, and the Hot Latin Songs chart in the US. The song has been ranked as the best World Cup anthem of all time by multiple publications.

The third single from Vuelve, "La Bomba", was released on June 16, 1998; it reached number five in Spain, number 27 on the Hot Latin Songs chart, and ranked on several charts in Europe and Australia. The album's fourth single, "Perdido Sin Ti", was released on August 18, 1998, and became Martin's second number one on the Hot Latin Songs chart. "Por Arriba, Por Abajo", was the fifth single to be released from Vuelve on November 3, 1998; it reached number 13 in Spain and number 33 on the Hot Latin Songs chart. The album's final single, "Casi un Bolero", was launched on December 21, 1998. "Corazonado" was released as a promotional single in the US and peaked at number 20 on the Hot Latin Songs chart. Music videos were filmed for "Vuelve", "La Copa de la Vida", "La Bomba", "Perdido Sin Ti", and "Por Arriba, Por Abajo".

== Marketing ==
=== Release ===
Sony Music released Vuelve in Puerto Rico on February 12, 1998. Martin was on hand for the album's launch. It was released on the same day in the United States, February 24 in Spain, and the following month across the rest of Europe and Southeast Asia. To promote Vuelve in Asian markets, Sony Music Asia released a promo CD containing three versions of "María", and "The Cup of Life" (the English-language version of "La Copa de la Vida"). Sony Music Japan launched the album in the label's native country on March 25, 1998, to coincide with Martin's advertisement campaign for Suzuki. The European edition of Vuelve includes the Spanglish radio edit of "La Copa de la Vida" while the Australian adds the radio edit of "María" as well; neither features the instrumental rendition of "Casi un Bolero". The Japanese release includes the three aforementioned tracks. For the Asian market, the album includes two more remixes of "La Copa de la Vida" in addition to a remix of "La Bomba", the Spanglish rendition of "Casi un Bolero" and Martin's previously recorded songs "Corazón" (transl. "Heart"), "Dónde Estarás" (transl. "Where Could You Be"), and "Te Extraño, Te Olvido, Te Amo" (transl. "I Miss You, I Forget You, I Love You"). Martin advertised Vuelve on Siempre en Domingo in Mexico and Hey Hey It's Saturday in Australia.

=== Live performances ===
To further promote Vuelve, Martin embarked on the worldwide Vuelve Tour; he performed in Asia, Australia, Europe, Mexico, South America, and the United States. The day after releasing the album, Martin held two sold-out concerts at the 30,000-seat Hiram Bithorn Stadium in Puerto Rico on February 13 and 14, 1998, respectively. In South America, he performed in Argentina, Chile, Colombia, Peru, and Venezuela. His shows in Venezuela and Peru were held as benefit concerts, the former as part of "A Venezuela Without Drugs" campaign, and the latter for the Foundation for Children of Peru . Martin also participated in the second annual "Festival Presidente de Música Latino" in the Dominican Republic on June 26, 1997, where he had top billing for the event. In Asia, he toured in India, China, Japan, Malaysia, and Singapore. A concert was planned for Indonesia in May of the same year but was cancelled because of anti-government rioting. In the US, he performed at the Miami Arena in Miami, the Arrowhead Pond in Anaheim, and Madison Square Garden in New York. His sold-out performance at the Arrowhead Pond grossed over $446,805 which landed it at number 10 on the Boxscore chart on November 7, 1998. For this achievement, the concert's promoter, the Nederlander Organization, presented Martin with the Estrella del Pond Award. His show at Madison Square Garden grossed $632,180 placing it second on the Boxscore chart of November 10.

A 14-piece band accompanied Martin during his tour, which included four backup vocalists alongside percussion and brass sections. His hour-and-45 minute show consisted of 17 tracks of uptempo numbers and ballads from Vuelve and his earlier career. Aside from the tour, Martin sang "The Cup of Life" live at the 1998 FIFA World Cup Final in France, on the halftime show at the Dallas Cowboys-New England Patriots football game at the Estadio Azteca in Mexico City, and the 1999 Grammy Awards. Billboard's John Lannert criticized Martin's presentation in Puerto Rico for the uneven number of slow-tempo and dance numbers as well as the awkward pauses when he changed outfits off-stage. The Los Angeles Times critic Ernesto Lechner felt that Martin "showcased his slick, masterfully composed pop material" at his show at the Arrowhead Pond but remarked that the singer "might have served himself and his fans better by performing a handful of nights at a more intimate venue than the Pond".

== Critical reception ==
Professional ratings
Review scores
Source	Rating
AllMusic	3/5 stars
Los Angeles Times	3.5/4 stars
Rolling Stone	3/5 stars

Vuelve was met with generally favorable reviews from music critics with the uptempo tracks receiving with the most positive reactions. AllMusic's Jose F. Promis complimented Martin over how it "effectively balances" dance tracks and ballads. He cited "La Copa de la Vida" as the main highlight but preferred the original version on the album to the English-language adaption. He also lauded the other dance numbers from the record. John Lannert of Billboard magazine compared Vuelve to A Medio Vivir as a "like-minded package of meaty, bitter-sweet romantic ballads and chest-pumping, upbeat numbers". He felt the uptempo songs had the potential to be a hit. Vilma Maldonado of The Monitor praised the record as "creative history" and its production as "seamless" and mentioned that "La Copa de la Copa" stands out the most. Writing for Vista magazine, Carmen Teresa Roiz described the record as a metamorphosis for Martin; she regarded it as the culmination of his music career in "all his splendor".

In the San Antonio Express-News, Ramiro Burr remarked Martin "took careful notes" following the success of "Maria" as Vuelve "continues in that same party fever vein but with more intensity". Burr complimented Porter for being able to maintain the "right balance between the gorgeous R&B drive of the horn and high-energy pop rhythms" on the production and commented that the ballads "serve only as breaks from dancing". David Wild of Rolling Stone touted the record's "extremely polished and infectious Latin pop that's immediately accessible even to dogged English-speaking types". The Miami Herald editor Leila Cobo wrote a positive review of Vuelve; she called the album a "collection of baila-able tunes interspersed with catchy pop ballads and felt the arrangements make it "stand above the often heavily synthesized Latin pop fray". For The Dallas Morning News, Mario Tarradell complimented the singer for "showing a refreshing flair for diversity". He regarded the dance tunes "Lola, Lola", "La Bomba", and "Marcia Baila" as the best tracks on the album.

Critics, however, were divided on the ballads. Promis found some of them forgettable, particularly on the second half of the record. Maldonado found the hook on the title track to be "instant and unforgettable" a sentiment shared by Roiz whereas Cobo criticized it as one of the weakest songs from the album and felt its choruses were "irritating" as they overshadowed Martin's voice. Burr's only complaint about Vuelve was the inclusion of "No Importa la Distancia", describing it as "sappy" which Tarradell similarly expressed as an "unwelcome dose of sugary pap". Tarradell also opined that the ballads "fell into excess" and called the instrumental version of "Casi un Bolero" an "overkill" although he praised "Vuelve" and "Perdido Sin Ti". The Los Angeles Times' Lechner commended Martin's vocal ability on the album to "handle both ballads and up-tempo tunes" and cited the title track would make the album "most likely survive the test of time". In addition, he admired "Hagamos el Amor" for its "sly use of the orchestral passages, passionate delivery, and an overall mood that belongs only to an album by a real artist" despite recognizing the title of the song. Richard Torres of Newsday, writing a positive review of Vuelve, was more receptive of the ballads. He complimented Martin's "soulful falsetto" on "Corazonado", the "sweetness" of "Perdido Sin Ti", and the "gospel-ish intensity" on the title track.

=== Accolades ===
At the 10th Annual Lo Nuestro Awards in 1998, Vuelve received a nomination for Pop Album of the Year, but lost to Me Estoy Enamorando by Alejandro Fernández. At the 41st Annual Grammy Awards in 1999, Martin won the Grammy Award for Best Latin Pop Performance for Vuelve. At the 1999 Billboard Latin Music Awards, it won Pop Album of the Year by a Male Artist, and El Premio de la Gente for Male Pop Artist or Group and Album of the Year at the Ritmo Latino Music Awards in the same year. In 2015, the album was listed among Billboard's 50 Essential Latin Albums of the 50 Past Years. An editor opined, "Pop and dance beats never sounded so good."

== Commercial performance ==
In the US, Vuelve debuted atop the Billboard Top Latin Albums the week of February 28, 1998, succeeding Me Estoy Enamorando. The album spent 26 weeks in this position. Billboard's Lannert credited its success on Valentine's Day weekend sales. On the US Billboard 200, Vuelve debuted at number 81. A year after its release, sales of Vuelve climbed after Martin's performance of "La Copa de la Vida" at the Grammy Awards. The album ended 1998 as the second best-selling Latin album (after Me Estoy Enamorando), and the best-selling Latin record the following year in the US. His rendition, along with anticipation of Martin's first English-language album, helped the former to peak at number 40 on the Billboard 200. According to Nielsen SoundScan, Vuelve has sold over 888,000 copies in the US, making it the 10th best-selling Latin album in the country as of October 2017. It was certified platinum by the Recording Industry Association of America (RIAA) for shipping over 1,000,000 units. In Canada, Vuelve reached number three on the RPM chart and number 11 on the Canadian Albums Charts; it was certified double platinum for shipping 200,000 copies in Canada. Over 1.5 million copies of the album have been shipped in Latin America. Vuelve has been certified triple platinum in Argentina, and platinum in the respective countries of Peru and Uruguay. It was certified double gold by AMPROFON for shipments of 200,000 units.

Vuelve debuted atop the Spanish Albums Chart on the March 4, 1998, issue. It was certified six-times platinum by the Productores de Música de España (PROMUSICAE), shipment of over 600,000 copies in Spain. The album also peaked at number one on the Portuguese Albums Chart, and received a platinum certification from Associação Fonográfica Portuguesa (AFP) denoting shipments of over 40,000 copies in Portugal. Vuelve debuted at number 34 on the Norwegian Albums Chart. In its fifth week on the chart, it peaked at number one and stayed on the top for three consecutive weeks. It became Martin's first number-one album in Norway, and was certified gold by International Federation of the Phonographic Industry (IFPI) Norway for selling over 25,000 copies in the country. In Sweden, Vuelve debuted at number 29 on the albums chart on April 10, 1998. After fluctuating on the chart for 17 weeks, on July 31, 1998, it reached its peak at number two. The album was certified platinum by the Swedish Recording Industry Association (GLF), denoting shipments in Sweden of over 80,000 copies. It received a platinum certification from the IFPI signifying sales of 1,000,000 copies in Europe, and as of 2006, over 2.1 million copies have been shipped in the region.

In Southeast Asia, Vuelve was certified gold in Singapore and platinum in Indonesia, Taiwan, and Thailand. In Malaysia, the record reached number three on the albums chart, while it peaked at number 19 on Japan's Oricon Albums Chart, and was certified gold in both countries. In Turkey, Vuelve certified sextuple platinum for sales of 180,000 copies, making it the best-selling album in the country by an international solo artist. Vuelve shipped over one million copies in Asia and had sold over six million copies worldwide by 2008.

== Track listing ==
Vuelve track listing
No.	Title	Writer(s)	Producer(s)	Length
1.	"Por Arriba, Por Abajo"	Robi Rosa; Luis Gómez-Escolar; César Lemos; Karla Aponte	KC Porter; Rosa	3:07
2.	"Vuelve"	Franco De Vita	Porter; Rosa	5:08
3.	"Lola, Lola"	Rosa; Porter; Gómez-Escolar	Porter; Rosa	4:46
4.	"Casi un Bolero"	Rosa; Porter; Gómez-Escolar	Porter; Rosa	4:39
5.	"Corazonado"	Rosa; Porter; Gómez-Escolar	Porter; Rosa	4:58
6.	"La Bomba"	Rosa; Porter; Gómez-Escolar	Porter; Rosa	4:34
7.	"Hagamos el Amor"	Rosa; Gómez-Escolar	Porter; Rosa	3:11
8.	"La Copa de la Vida"	Rosa; Desmond Child; Gómez-Escolar	Child; Rosa	4:28
9.	"Perdido Sin Ti"	Rosa; Porter; Gómez-Escolar	Porter; Rosa	4:10
10.	"Así Es la Vida"	Marco Flores; Gómez-Escolar	Porter; Rosa	4:00
11.	"Marcia Baila"	Fred Chichin; Catherine Ringer; Gómez-Escolar	Porter; Rosa	3:59
12.	"No Importa la Distancia"	Alan Menken; Renato López; Javier Pontón	Porter; Rosa	4:55
13.	"Gracias por Pensar en Mi"	Renato Russo; Ricky Martin	Porter; Rosa	5:34
14.	"Casi un Bolero" (Instrumental)	Rosa; Porter; Gómez-Escolar	Porter; Rosa	4:39

European bonus track
No.	Title	Writer(s)	Producer(s)	Length
14.	"The Cup of Life" (Remix – Spanglish Radio Edit)	Rosa; Child; Gómez-Escolar	Child; Rosa; Pablo Flores	4:37

Australian bonus tracks
No.	Title	Writer(s)	Producer(s)	Length
14.	"The Cup of Life" (Remix – Spanglish Radio Edit)	Rosa; Child; Gómez-Escolar	Child; Rosa; Flores	4:37
15.	"María" (Radio Edit)	Ian Blake; Porter; Gómez-Escolar	Porter; Blake; Flores; Javier Garza	3:15

Japanese bonus tracks
No.	Title	Writer(s)	Producer(s)	Length
14.	"María" (Spanglish Radio Edit)	Blake; Porter; Gómez-Escolar	Porter; Blake; Flores; Garza	4:31
15.	"Casi un Bolero" (Instrumental)	Rosa; Porter; Gómez-Escolar	Porter; Rosa	4:39
16.	"The Cup of Life" (English Version)	Rosa; Child; Gómez-Escolar	Child; Rosa; Flores	4:33

Asian limited edition bonus tracks (disc one)
No.	Title	Writer(s)	Producer(s)	Length
14.	"María" (Spanglish Radio Edit)	Blake; Porter; Gómez-Escolar	Porter; Blake; Flores; Garza	4:31
15.	"The Cup of Life" (Remix – Spanglish Radio Edit)	Rosa; Child; Gómez-Escolar	Child; Rosa; Flores	4:37

Asian limited edition bonus tracks (disc two)
No.	Title	Writer(s)	Producer(s)	Length
1.	"The Cup of Life" (Remix – Long Version)	Rosa; Child; Gómez-Escolar	Child; Rosa; Flores	8:40
2.	"La Bomba" (Pablo Flores Remix – Spanglish Edit)	Rosa; Porter; Gómez-Escolar	Porter; Rosa; Flores	4:15
3.	"Casi un Bolero" (Spanglish Version)	Rosa; Porter; Gómez-Escolar	Porter; Rosa	4:38
4.	"Dónde Estarás" (Radio Edit)	Cristóbal Sansano; Mónica Naranjo	Porter; Blake; Ramon Zenker	3:43
5.	"Corazón" (Radio Remix)	Porter; Luis Angel	Porter; Blake; JS16	4:06
6.	"Te Extraño, Te Olvido, Te Amo"	Carlos Lara	Porter; Blake	4:41

== Personnel ==
Credits for Vuelve adapted from AllMusic and the album liner notes.

=== Recording and mixing locations ===
- Ocean Way Recording, Los Angeles
- Worldbeat Recording, Calabasas
- Disney Studios, Burbank
- Criteria Studios, Miami
- South Beach Studios, Miami
- Centlemania Club Studio, Miami
- Rumbo Recorders, Canoga Park
- LAFX Studios, North Hollywood
- After Hours Studios, Miami
- The Bunny Hop Studios, Studio City
- O'Henry Studios, Burbank
- Circle House Studios, Miami
- Capitol Studios, Hollywood
- Eurosonic Studios, Madrid
- Studio 56, Hollywood
- Alpha Recording Studios, Puerto Rico
- Tone King Studios, Hollywood

=== Musicians and technical ===
- Michael Aarvold – mixing assistant
- Andy Abaz – tres
- Luis Aguino – percussion (Brazilian), trumpet
- Josie Aiello – background vocals
- Mike Ainsworth – mixing assistant
- Rusty Anderson – acoustic guitar (tracks 3, 8)
- Jonathan Antin – stylist
- Iris Aponte – project coordinator
- Karla Aponte – composer
- Carmit Bachar – background vocals
- Steve Bartek – orchestration
- John Beasley – piano (tracks 2, 11)
- Marcelo Berestovoy – acoustic guitar
- Curt Bisquera – drums (track 5)
- Phillipe Bourgués – acoustic guitar
- Chris Brooke – mixing assistant
- Robbie Buchanan – keyboards, piano
- Ed Calle – Metales
- Kari Cameron – bass (tracks 4, 9)
- Karl Cameron – engineer
- David Campbell – orchestration
- Chris Carroll – mixing assistant
- Teresa Cassin – assistant engineer
- Gloria Cheng – piano (track 7)
- Fred Chichin – composer
- Desmond Child – arranger, composer, producer
- Steve Churchyard – engineer
- Tony Concepcion – trumpet, flugel horn (tracks 8)
- Luis Conte – percussion (track 3)
- Ricardo Cordero – background vocals
- Joseph Lito Cortés – acoustic guitar, background vocals
- Orion Crawford – arranger, orchestration
- Franco De Vita – composer
- David Dominguez – assistant engineer
- G.B. Dorsey – background vocals
- Bruce Dukov – concertmaster
- Charles Dye – engineer, mixing
- Luis Enrique – percussion
- Luis Gómez-Escolar – composer, Spanish adaptation
- Benny Faccone – engineer, mixing
- Kenneth Faulk – Metales
- Robert Fernandez – engineer
- Jesus "Chuy" Flores – engineer
- Marco Flores – composer
- Humberto Gatica – mixing
- Jim Gilstrap – background vocals
- Francisco Manuel – palmas
- Ruiz Gómez – palmas
- Rich Gomez – acoustic guitar
- Jules Gondar – engineer
- Paul Gordon – assistant engineer
- Reggie Hamilton – bass (tracks 2, 10, 13)
- Katrina Harper – background vocals
- Paquito Hechavarria – piano (track 6)
- Femio Hernández – engineer
- Leo Herrera – mixing assistant
- Bunny Hull – background vocals
- Matt Hyde – engineer
- Ingram – background vocals
- Ethan James – Hurdy Gurdy
- Jorge M. Jaramillo – assistant Engineer
- Brian Jenkins – engineer
- Mortonette Jenkins – background vocals
- Marlena Jeter – background vocals
- Maxine Jeter – background vocals
- Jo Ann Kane – copyist
- John Karpowich – engineer
- Todd Keller – mixing assistant
- Erik Kerly – French horn (track 8)
- Scott Kieklak – assistant engineer
- John Kricker – trombone (track 8)
- Michael Landau – electric guitar (tracks 2, 4, 10, 13)
- Cesar Lemos – arranger, composer
- Gene Lo Assistant – engineer
- Manny López – guitar (track 8)
- Renato López – composer
- John Lowson – engineer
- Ángel "Angie" Machado – Brazilian percussion
- Ricky Martin – primary artist, Spanish adaptation, background vocals
- Peter McCabe – engineer
- Ángelo Medina – associate producer
- Alan Menken – composer
- Dwight Mikkelsen – copyist
- Lee Moore – stylist
- June Murakawa – mixing assistant
- Kristle Murden – background vocals
- Kieran Murray – assistant engineer
- René Juan De La Cruz Napoli – graphic design
- Rick Nelson – background vocals
- Carlos Nieto – engineer
- Meia Noite – Brazilian percussion
- Rafael Padilla – percussion
- Rik Pekkonen – engineer
- Tony Peluso – mixing
- Archie Peña – arranger, percussion (tracks 1, 6, 8)
- Phil Perry – background vocals
- Stella Petrova – background vocals
- Darryl Phinnessee – background vocals
- Alberto Pinto – assistant engineer
- Jeff Poe – engineer
- Javier Pontón – composer
- Mike Porcaro – bass (track 5)
- KC Porter – arranger, composer, multiple instruments, electric piano, producer, programming
- Luis Quine – mixing assistant
- Leo Quintero – cuatro (track 6)
- John "J.R." Robinson – drums
- Lázaro Rodriguez – guitar (track 8)
- Angelina Rosa – background vocals
- Héctor Iván Rosa – engineer
- Robi Rosa – arranger, background vocals, bass programming, composer, engineer, palmas, piano, producer
- Juan Rosario – assistant engineer
- Keith Rose – engineer
- William Ross – orchestration
- Bob Rothstein – mixing assistant
- Renato Russo – composer
- Iris Salazar – assistant engineer
- Rafa Sardina – assistant engineer
- Jeffrey Shannon – assistant engineer
- Jackie Simley – background vocals
- Bill Smith – assistant engineer
- Travis Smith – mixing assistant
- Rafael Solano – percussion (tracks 1, 6, 8)
- Luis Fernándea Soria – engineer
- Stephanie Spruill – background vocals
- Lance Staedler – photography
- Ramón Stagnaro – acoustic guitar (track 4
- Ted Stein – engineer
- Neil Stubenhaus – bass (track 12)
- Sarah Sykes – project coordinator
- Dana Taboe – trombrone (tracks 8)
- Michael Thompson – guitar
- Francisco "Pancho" Tomaselli – assistant engineer
- Carmen Twillie – background vocals
- Robert Valdez – assistant engineer
- Camilo Valencia – arranger
- Jose Luis Vega – background vocals
- Danny Vicari – engineer
- Esteban Villanueva – engineer, project coordinator
- Luis Felipe Villanueva – assistant engineer
- Randy Waldman – piano (track 2)
- Julia Waters – background vocals
- Oren Waters – background vocals
- Peter Yussi Wenger – acoustic guitar (tracks 1, 3)
- John West – background vocals
- Doc Wiley – engineer
- Maxine Willard Waters – background vocals
- Juan Vincente Zambrano – arranger, keyboards, programming
- David Zippel – composer

== Charts ==
=== Weekly charts ===
Chart performance for Vuelve
Chart (1998)	Peak position
Australian Albums (ARIA)	2
Austrian Albums (Ö3 Austria)	22
Belgian Albums (Ultratop Flanders)	37
Belgian Albums (Ultratop Wallonia)	22
Canada Top Albums/CDs (RPM)	3
Canadian Albums (Billboard)	11
Dutch Albums (Album Top 100)	41
European Albums (Top 100)	4
Finnish Albums (Suomen virallinen lista)	7
French Albums (SNEP)	23
German Albums (Offizielle Top 100)	15
Hungarian Albums (MAHASZ)	3
Italian Albums (Musica e dischi/FIMI)	4
Japanese Albums (Oricon)	19
Malaysian Albums (RIM)	3
Norwegian Albums (VG-lista)	1
Portuguese Albums (AFP)	1
Spanish Albums (PROMUSICAE)	1
Swedish Albums (Sverigetopplistan)	2
Swiss Albums (Schweizer Hitparade)	4
Taiwanese International Albums (IFPI)	1
US Billboard 200	40
US Top Latin Albums (Billboard)	1
US Latin Pop Albums (Billboard)	1

=== Year-end charts ===
1998 year-end chart performance for Vuelve
Chart (1998)	Position
Australian Albums (ARIA)	26
Belgian Albums (Ultratop Wallonia)	91
German Albums (Offizielle Top 100)	78
Norwegian Summer Period Albums (VG-lista)	5
Spanish Albums (PROMUSICAE)	4
Swiss Albums (Schweizer Hitparade)	14
US Top Latin Albums (Billboard)	2
US Latin Pop Albums (Billboard)	2

1999 year-end chart performance for Vuelve
Chart (1999)	Position
Canada Top Albums/CDs (RPM)	34
US Top Latin Albums (Billboard)	1
US Latin Pop Albums (Billboard)	1

2000 year-end chart performance for Vuelve
Chart (2000)	Position
Finnish Foreign Albums (Suomen virallinen lista)	69

=== All-time charts ===
All-time chart performance for Vuelve
Chart (2018)	Position
US Top Latin Albums (Billboard)	5

== Certifications and sales ==
Certifications and sales for Vuelve
Region	Certification	Certified units/sales
Argentina (CAPIF)	3× Platinum	180,000^{^}
Australia (ARIA)	2× Platinum	140,000^{^}
Brazil	—	128,000
Canada (Music Canada)	2× Platinum	200,000^{^}
Finland (Musiikkituottajat)	Gold	31,595
France (SNEP)	Gold	100,000^{*}
Germany	—	150,000
Italy	—	300,000
Japan (RIAJ)	Gold	204,000
Indonesia	Platinum	
Malaysia	Gold	
Mexico (AMPROFON)	2× Gold	200,000^{^}
Norway (IFPI Norway)	Gold	25,000^{*}
Peru	Platinum	
Poland (ZPAV)	Gold	50,000^{*}
Portugal (AFP)	Platinum	40,000^{^}
Singapore (RIAS)	Gold	7,500^{*}
Spain (Promusicae)	6× Platinum	630,000
Sweden (GLF)	Platinum	120,000
Switzerland (IFPI Switzerland)	Platinum	50,000^{^}
Taiwan (RIT)	Platinum	200,000
Thailand	Platinum	
Turkey (Mü-Yap)	6× Platinum	200,000
United States (RIAA)	Platinum	888,000
Uruguay (CUD)	Platinum	6,000^{^}
Summaries
Asia	—	1,000,000
Europe (IFPI)	Platinum	2,100,000
Worldwide	—	6,000,000
^{*} Sales figures based on certification alone.^{^} Shipments figures based on certification alone.

== Release history ==
Release dates and formats for Vuelve
Region	Date	Format(s)	Label(s)	Ref.
Hong Kong	February 10, 1998	CD	Columbia Records	
Taiwan	March 11, 1998	CD	Columbia Records	
Japan	April 22, 1998	CD	Epic/Sony Records	

== See also ==
- 1998 in Latin music
- List of best-selling albums in Turkey
- List of best-selling Latin albums
- List of best-selling Latin albums in the United States
- List of number-one Billboard Top Latin Albums from the 1990s
- List of number-one Billboard Latin Pop Albums from the 1990s
- List of number-one singles of 1998 (Spain)
