= Bombón de Azúcar =

Bombón de Azúcar may refer to:

- "Bombón de Azúcar" (song), a song by Ricky Martin
- Bombón de Azúcar (album), an album by La Secta AllStar
