= Volveras (Ricky Martin song) =

- Mexican 1997 promo single

Single by Ricky Martin

from the album A Medio Vivir
- Released: January 7, 1997
- Recorded: 1995
- Genre: Latin pop
- Length: 4:50
- Label: Sony Discos; Columbia
- Songwriters: Luis Gómez-Escolar; K. C. Porter; Ian Blake; Ricky Martin
- Producers: K. C. Porter; Ian Blake

Ricky Martin singles chronology
"Diana" (1996)	"Volveras" (1997)	"Nada es Imposible" (1997)

Audio
- "Ricky Martin - Volveras (Audio)" on YouTube

"Volveras" (English: "You Will Come Back") is the seventh single from Ricky Martin's album, A Medio Vivir (1995). It was released as a single in the United States and Spain on January 7, 1997, and in France in March 1998.

== Music video ==
A music video was shot in January 1997 in New York.

== Chart performance ==
The song reached number six on the Hot Latin Songs in the United States in 1997.

After the success of "Maria" and "Te Extraño, Te Olvido, Te Amo" in France, "Volveras" was also released there as a single in March 1998. It peaked at number forty-eight.

== Formats and track listings ==
French CD single

1. "Volveras" – 4:50
2. "Revolución" – 3:50

== Charts ==
=== Weekly charts ===
Chart (1997–1998)	Peak position
France (SNEP)	48
Spain (Top 40 Radio)	20
US Hot Latin Songs (Billboard)	6
US Latin Pop Airplay (Billboard)	2
US Tropical Airplay (Billboard)	17

=== Year-end charts ===
Chart (1997)	Position
US Hot Latin Songs (Billboard)	33
US Latin Pop Songs (Billboard)	10
