= Corazonado =

1999 song by Ricky Martin

Promotional single by Ricky Martin

from the album Vuelve
- Released: January 12, 1999
- Recorded: 1997
- Genre: Latin pop
- Length: 4:58
- Label: Columbia
- Songwriters: Luis Gómez-Escolar; K. C. Porter; Draco Rosa
- Producers: K. C. Porter; Draco Rosa

Ricky Martin Promotional singles chronology
| "Dónde Estarás" (1997) | "Corazonado" (1999) | "Cambia la Piel" (2001) |

Audio
- "Ricky Martin - Corazonado (Audio)" on YouTube

"Corazonado" (English: "Presentiment") is a song by Puerto Rican singer Ricky Martin released as the only promotional single from his fourth studio album, Vuelve (1998) on January 12, 1999.

== Chart performance ==
The song reached number twenty on the Hot Latin Songs in the United States.

== Formats and track listings ==
US promotional CD single

1. "Corazonado" – 4:58

== Charts ==
| Chart (1999) | Peak position |
|---|---|
| US Hot Latin Songs (Billboard) | 20 |

== Reception ==
Billboard Magazine gave the song a favorable review, stating it is a "meaty, bittersweet romantic ballad", with a "slow-paced narrative". El Norte thought the song was "weak" and a "rather slow ballad". The El Paso Times said the track was the "protagonist" of all the songs on the album, and Corazonado was also the "most intimate song" featured on the album.
