= A Medio Vivir =

1995 studio album by Ricky Martin

Studio album by Ricky Martin
- Released: September 12, 1995
- Recorded: 1995
- Genre: Latin pop
- Length: 52:26
- Label: Sony Discos; Columbia
- Producer: K. C. Porter; Ian Blake

Ricky Martin chronology
| Me Amaras (1993) | A Medio Vivir (1995) | Vuelve (1998) |

Alternate cover

Singles from A Medio Vivir
- 1. "Te Extraño, Te Olvido, Te Amo" Released: August 14, 1995; 2. "María" Released: November 21, 1995; 3. "A Medio Vivir" Released: February 13, 1996; 4. "Fuego de Noche, Nieve de Día" Released: April 16, 1996; 5. "Como Decirte Adiós" Released: August 6, 1996; 6. "Bombón de Azúcar" Released: October 15, 1996; 7. "Volverás" Released: January 7, 1997; 8. "Nada es Imposible" Released: April 22, 1997; 9. "Corazón" Released: October 27, 1997

Professional ratings
Review scores
| Source | Rating |
|---|---|
| AllMusic | 4/5 stars |

A Medio Vivir (English: Half Living) is the third studio album by the Puerto Rican singer Ricky Martin, released by Sony Discos and Columbia on September 12, 1995 (US).

== Commercial performance ==
The album has sold over three million copies, worldwide. That number includes 1.3 million copies sold in Europe.

A Medio Vivir was released at first in Latin America in 1995. It peaked at number eleven on the Top Latin Albums in the US. Five songs from this album charted on the Hot Latin Songs, including "María" and "Volverás", which both peaked at number six, "Te Extraño, Te Olvido, Te Amo" which reached number nine, "Nada es Imposible" (number twenty-three) and "A Medio Vivir" (number thirty-six). The album was certified 6× Platinum in Argentina.

In 1996, "María" debuted on the Billboard Hot 100 in the United States, and peaked at number eighty-eight. The album has sold 287,000 copies in the US and was certified Gold by the RIAA for shipping 500,000 copies. The same year, "María" charted in Spain and Finland, and A Medio Vivir followed peaking inside top ten in both countries. It was certified 4× Platinum in Spain and Gold in Finland.

However, the real international breakthrough came in 1997, when "María" became a hit all over Europe. A Medio Vivir debuted on the charts in various countries, peaking inside top ten in France and Belgium Wallonia. It was certified Platinum by the IFPI, after selling one million copies in Europe. It was certified Platinum in France and Belgium and Gold in Switzerland.

After the success of "María", "Te Extraño, Te Olvido, Te Amo" was released as the second international single. It peaked inside top ten in France and Belgium Wallonia. "Volverás" was released as the third single and peaked at number forty-eight in France. "Corazón" was released in Finland reaching number twenty.

== Track listing ==
| No. | Title | Writer(s) | Producer(s) | Length |
|---|---|---|---|---|
| 1. | "Fuego de Noche, Nieve de Día" | Ian Blake; K. C. Porter; Luis Gómez-Escolar | Porter; Blake | 5:37 |
| 2. | "A Medio Vivir" | Franco De Vita | Porter; Blake | 4:42 |
| 3. | "María" | Blake; Porter; Escolar | Porter; Blake | 4:23 |
| 4. | "Te Extraño, Te Olvido, Te Amo" | Carlos Lara | Porter; Blake | 4:41 |
| 5. | "Dónde Estarás" | Cristóbal Sansano; Mónica Naranjo | Porter; Blake | 3:52 |
| 6. | "Volverás" | Blake; Porter; Escolar; Ricky Martin | Porter; Blake | 4:52 |
| 7. | "Revolución" | Blake; Porter; Escolar | Porter; Blake | 3:50 |
| 8. | "Somos la Semilla" | Blake; Porter; Manolo Tena | Porter; Blake | 3:56 |
| 9. | "Como Decirte Adiós" | Marco Flores | Porter; Blake | 3:00 |
| 10. | "Bombón de Azúcar" | Mark Kilpatrick; Gustavo Laureano; Carlos Figueroa; John Lengel; Carlos Rolón | Porter; Blake | 4:58 |
| 11. | "Corazón" | Porter; Luis Angel | Porter; Blake | 4:20 |
| 12. | "Nada es Imposible" | Alejandro Sanz | Porter; Blake | 4:22 |

European bonus track
| No. | Title | Writer(s) | Producer(s) | Length |
|---|---|---|---|---|
| 13. | "María" (Spanglish Radio Edit) | Blake; Porter; Escolar | Porter; Blake; Pablo Flores; Javier Garza | 4:31 |

European reissue bonus tracks
| No. | Title | Writer(s) | Producer(s) | Length |
|---|---|---|---|---|
| 13. | "María" (Spanglish Radio Edit) | Blake; Porter; Escolar | Porter; Blake; Flores; Garza | 4:31 |
| 14. | "Corazón" (JS16 Radio Remix) | Porter; Angel | Porter; Blake; JS16 | 4:06 |
| 15. | "Dónde Estarás" (Moon Mix Radio Edit) | Sansano; Naranjo | Porter; Blake; Flores; Garza | 4:47 |

Brazilian reissue bonus tracks
| No. | Title | Writer(s) | Producer(s) | Length |
|---|---|---|---|---|
| 13. | "María" (Radio Edit) | Blake; Porter; Escolar | Porter; Blake | 4:38 |
| 14. | "María" (María) | Blake; Porter; Escolar | Porter; Blake | 4:23 |
| 15. | "Te Quero, Te Esqueço Te Amo" (Te Extraño, Te Olvido, Te Amo) | Lara | Porter; Blake | 4:39 |
| 16. | "María" (Versão Salsa & Merengue) | Blake; Porter; Escolar | Porter; Blake | 4:23 |

== Charts ==
=== Weekly charts ===
| Chart (1995–1997) | Peak position |
|---|---|
| Argentinian Albums (CAPIF) | 2 |
| Austrian Albums (Ö3 Austria) | 22 |
| Belgian Albums (Ultratop Flanders) | 35 |
| Belgian Albums (Ultratop Wallonia) | 10 |
| Chilean Albums (IFPI) | 3 |
| Dutch Albums (Album Top 100) | 27 |
| European Albums (Top 100) | 20 |
| Finnish Albums (Suomen virallinen lista) | 10 |
| French Albums (SNEP) | 8 |
| German Albums (Offizielle Top 100) | 20 |
| Hungarian Albums (MAHASZ) | 25 |
| Spanish Albums (PROMUSICAE) | 7 |
| Swedish Albums (Sverigetopplistan) | 51 |
| Swiss Albums (Schweizer Hitparade) | 12 |
| US Top Latin Albums (Billboard) | 11 |
| US Latin Pop Albums (Billboard) | 6 |

=== Year-end charts ===
| Chart (1996) | Position |
|---|---|
| Spanish Albums (PROMUSICAE) | 11 |
| US Top Latin Albums (Billboard) | 13 |
| US Latin Pop Albums (Billboard) | 10 |

| Chart (1997) | Position |
|---|---|
| Belgian Albums (Ultratop Wallonia) | 46 |
| French Albums (SNEP) | 35 |
| Spanish Albums (PROMUSICAE) | 34 |
| Swiss Albums (Schweizer Hitparade) | 47 |
| US Top Latin Albums (Billboard) | 37 |

| Chart (1998) | Position |
|---|---|
| US Top Latin Catalog Albums (Billboard) | 8 |

| Chart (2000) | Position |
|---|---|
| Finnish Foreign Albums (Suomen virallinen lista) | 101 |

== Certifications and sales ==
| Region | Certification | Certified units/sales |
|---|---|---|
| Argentina (CAPIF) | 6× Platinum | 360,000^{^} |
| Belgium (BRMA) | Platinum | 50,000^{*} |
| Brazil | — | 253,000 |
| Chile | Platinum+Gold | |
| Costa Rica | Gold | |
| El Salvador | Gold | |
| Finland (Musiikkituottajat) | Gold | 29,363 |
| France (SNEP) | Platinum | 300,000^{*} |
| Mexico (AMPROFON) | 2× Platinum | 500,000^{^} |
| Paraguay | Platinum+Gold | |
| Spain (Promusicae) | 4× Platinum | 440,000 |
| Switzerland (IFPI Switzerland) | Gold | 25,000^{^} |
| United States (RIAA) | Gold | 500,000^{^} |
| Uruguay (CUD) | Platinum+Gold | |
Summaries
| Central America (CFC) | Gold | |
| Europe (IFPI) | Platinum | 1,300,000 |
| Worldwide | — | 3,000,000 |
^{*} Sales figures based on certification alone.^{^} Shipments figures based on certification alone.

== Release history ==
| Region | Date | Label | Format | Catalog |
|---|---|---|---|---|
| Hong Kong | July 25, 1997 | Sony Music | CD | |
| Japan | October 22, 1997 | Epic/Sony Records | CD | ESCA-6832 |

== The European Tour DVD ==
Europa: European Tour

Video by Ricky Martin
- Released: July 3, 2001
- Recorded: 1997 in Europe
- Length: 78:00

Ricky Martin chronology
| La Historia (2001) | Europa: European Tour (2001) | MTV Unplugged (2006) |

Europa: European Tour is a DVD release by Ricky Martin recorded during his sold-out tour in Europe in 1997 while promoting A Medio Vivir.

=== Track listing ===
| No. | Title | Length |
|---|---|---|
| 1. | "Rick Martin Europa" |
| 2. | "Dónde Estarás" (retitled "No Puedo Mas") |
| 3. | "Montje Palma de Mallorca" |
| 4. | "Bombón de Azúcar" |
| 5. | "Ricky on Tour" |
| 6. | "Nada es Imposible" |
| 7. | "Ricky's Crew" |
| 8. | "A Medio Vivir" |
| 9. | "Te Extraño, Te Olvido, Te Amo" (making of) |
| 10. | "Te Extraño, Te Olvido, Te Amo" (videoclip) |
| 11. | "Ricky's Fans" |
| 12. | "Susana" |
| 13. | "Te Extraño, Te Olvido, Te Amo" |
| 14. | "María" |
| 15. | "Backstage" |

== See also ==
- 1995 in Latin music
- List of best-selling albums in Argentina
- List of best-selling Latin albums
