= Nada es Imposible (song) =

Single by Ricky Martin

from the album A Medio Vivir
- Released: April 22, 1997
- Recorded: 1995
- Genre: Latin pop
- Length: 4:22
- Label: Columbia
- Songwriter: Alejandro Sanz
- Producers: K. C. Porter; Ian Blake

Ricky Martin singles chronology
"Volverás" (1997)	"Nada es Imposible" (1997)	"No Importa La Distancia" (1997)

Audio
- "Ricky Martin - Nada Es Imposible (Audio)" on YouTube

"Nada es Imposible" (English: "Nothing Is Impossible") is the eighth single from Ricky Martin's album, A Medio Vivir (1995). It was released as a single in the United States on April 22, 1997.

The song was written by Spanish singer-songwriter Alejandro Sanz.

"Nada es Imposible" reached number twenty-three on the Hot Latin Songs in the United States.

== Formats and track listings ==
US CD single

1. "Nada es Imposible" – 4:22

== Charts ==
Chart (1997)	Peak position
US Hot Latin Songs (Billboard)	23
US Latin Pop Airplay (Billboard)	6
