= Cheng Lin =

Chinese singer

- Born: 15 October 1967 (age 58); Luoyang, Henan, China
- Genres: Pop music
- Occupation: Singer
- Instrument: Erhu
- Years active: 1980–present
- Website: www.chenglinmusic.cn

Cheng Lin (Chinese: 程琳; pinyin: Chéng Lín) is a Chinese singer.

== Music career ==
Her career started at the age of 13 when she released the track "Little Conch" in 1980. The track launched her to stardom in China, which followed with the release of her first album, Little Conch.

Her career was quickly disrupted in 1981, when the conservative critics, including the People's Daily, were scandalized by her mature and pop-oriented singing style at a young age, leading to a two-year ban on stage performances, during which she contented herself with playing the erhu. Her second album Childhood Cradle was released in 1983. A year later a third album New Shoe, Old Shoe was recorded.

In 1987, she released her fourth album, Songs of 1987, with some of China's first music videos aired on CCTV. She performed the song, "Flying with the Wind (Xin Tian You)", at the CCTV Spring Festival Gala in 1988. In 1989, she returned to the Gala with the song "Kung Fu boy".

Cheng toured and studied in Australia, France, and the US in the early 1990s. She did not return to Beijing until 1995, when she released the fifth album Home Coming, produced by Hong Kong-based producer James Wong. In the years that followed, she sometimes performed at charity concerts in China. In 2003, she toured with KC Porter on his "Embrace the World Tour". In 2004, she was invited to perform with Jean Michel Jarre at the "Sino France Culture Year" in Tiananmen Square and Forbidden City.

In 2006, she toured with the band Ozomatli. In 2007, she began working on her album, with the help of KC Porter. In 2008 she released a greatest hits album, including "Little Conch" and "Flying with the Wind" (Xin Tian You). In the same year she also created a song for the Beijing Olympics, titled "Greater Than Gold". In 2010, she was invited to work on the Global Village project with Spencer Proffer. She recorded the theme song "Citizen of the World". In 2011, the album she had worked on with KC Porter was released after her 2011 concert, with the title Greater than Gold.

== Other work ==
In 1989 she was cast to appear in the film Black Snow. It starred leading actor Jiang Wen, and went on to win the Silver Bear award in Berlin.

In 2008 Cheng began work on a book titled Ray of Light.

== Personal life ==
Cheng dated Taiwanese musician Hou Dejian, initially her music producer, from early 1980s to 1989. She faced public and professional pressure when she moved in with him, and more seriously after Hou became a prominent supporter of the Tiananmen Square protests. She was also the subject of widespread reports linking her romantically to student leader Wu’er Kaixi, which she denied. For these reasons, Cheng was sidelined from the Chinese entertainment industry throughout the 1990s, until reappearing at a CCTV concert in 2000.

== Studio Albums ==
Year	Title	Label	Record Company
1983	Little Conch (小螺号)	Feida (飞达)	Beijing Tape Recorder Factory (北京录音机厂)
1983	Childhood Cradle (童年的小摇车)	Skylark (雲雀)	Pacific Audio & Video Co. (太平洋影音公司)
1984	New Shoe, Old Shoe (新鞋子、旧鞋子)	CAV	China Audio-Video Publishing House (中国录音录像公司)
1987	Song of 1987 (新歌.1987)	Nanguo (南国)	China Record Co. Guangzhou (中国唱片公司广州分公司)
2008	Home coming (回家)	Skylark (雲雀)	Pacific Audio & Video Co. (太平洋影音公司)
2011	Greater Than Gold (比金更重)	JSCP (杰盛唱片)	Guangdong Jiesheng Records Co., Ltd. (广东杰盛唱片有限公司)
