= A Medio Vivir (song) =

Single by Ricky Martin

from the album A Medio Vivir
- Released: February 13, 1996
- Recorded: 1995
- Genre: Latin pop
- Length: 4:42
- Label: Sony Discos; Columbia
- Songwriter: Franco De Vita
- Producers: K. C. Porter; Ian Blake

Ricky Martin singles chronology
"María" (1995)	"A Medio Vivir" (1996)	"Fuego de Noche, Nieve de Día" (1996)

Audio
- "Ricky Martin - A Medio Vivir (Audio)" on YouTube

"A Medio Vivir" (English: "Half Living") is the title track and the third single from Ricky Martin's album, A Medio Vivir (1995). It was released as a single in the United States on February 13, 1996, and in May 1997 in Spain.

The song reached number thirty-six on the Hot Latin Songs in the United States.

== Formats and track listings ==
US CD single

1. "A Medio Vivir" – 4:42

== Charts ==
Chart (1996–1997)	Peak position
Argentina (Record Report)	4
Spain (Top 40 Radio)	34
US Hot Latin Songs (Billboard)	36
US Latin Pop Airplay (Billboard)	8
US Tropical Airplay (Billboard)	19
Venezuela (Record Report)	5
