= Dónde Estarás =

- Mexican 1997 promo single

Promotional single by Ricky Martin

from the album A Medio Vivir
- Released: November 20, 1997
- Recorded: 1995
- Genre: Latin pop
- Length: 3:52
- Label: Columbia
- Songwriters: Cristóbal Sansano; Mónica Naranjo
- Producers: K. C. Porter; Ian Blake

Ricky Martin Promotional singles chronology
"Ser Feliz" (1993)	"Dónde Estarás" (1997)	"Corazonado" (1999)

Audio
- "Ricky Martin - Donde Estaras (Audio)" on YouTube

"Dónde Estarás" (English: "Where Could You Be") is a song by Puerto Rican singer Ricky Martin released as the only promotional single from his third studio album, A Medio Vivir (1995) on November 20, 1997.

A music video was directed by Pedro Aznar.

The song was remixed by Pablo Flores and Javier Garza, Ramon Zenker and Niki Zenker, and by PM Project. The remixes were also included on the "Te Extraño, Te Olvido, Te Amo" single, "María" single, the limited European edition of A Medio Vivir, and the Japanese limited edition of Vuelve.

"Dónde Estarás" is included on Martin's 2001 DVD, Europa: European Tour.

== Formats and track listings ==
Brazilian promotional CD maxi-single

1. "Dónde Estarás" (Album Version) – 3:52
2. "Dónde Estarás" (Version Remix) – 4:51
3. "Dónde Estarás" (Moon Mix Radio Edit) – 4:48
4. "Dónde Estarás" (Pablo and Javier's Moon Mix) – 9:16

European CD single

1. "Dónde Estarás" (Radio Edit) – 3:43
2. "Dónde Estarás" (PM Project Remix)

European CD maxi-single

1. "Dónde Estarás" (Radio Edit) – 3:43
2. "Dónde Estarás" (Dub Remix)
3. "Dónde Estarás" (PM Project Extended Mix) – 6:10
4. "Dónde Estarás" (Moon Mix Radio Edit) – 4:48

European 12" maxi-single

1. "Dónde Estarás" (Extended Remix) – 4:45
2. "Dónde Estarás" (Dub Remix)
3. "Dónde Estarás" (PM Project Extended Mix) – 6:10
4. "Dónde Estarás" (Pablo and Javier's Moon Mix) – 9:16

Mexican promotional CD single

1. "Dónde Estarás" (Album Version) – 3:52
2. "Dónde Estarás" (Version Remix) – 4:51
