= Cambia la Piel =

2000 single by Ricky Martin

Promotional single by Ricky Martin

from the album Sound Loaded
- Released: October 15, 2001
- Recorded: 2000
- Genre: Latin pop
- Length: 5:13
- Label: Columbia
- Songwriter: Pau Donés Cirera
- Producer: K. C. Porter

Ricky Martin Promotional singles chronology
"Corazonado" (1999)	"Cambia la Piel" (2001)	"Shine" (2011)

Audio
- "Ricky Martin - Cambia La Piel [Spanish Edit] (audio)" on YouTube

"Cambia la Piel" (English: "Shed your skin") is a song by Puerto Rican singer Ricky Martin released as the only promotional single from his second English-language album, Sound Loaded (2000) in Spain and Latin America on October 15, 2001.

== Background and release ==
"Cambia la Piel" is a Spanish-language song written by Pau Donés Cirera, leader of the Spanish rock group Jarabe de Palo. It was produced by Martin's collaborator, K. C. Porter. Thanks to "Cambia la Piel" (among few other tracks), Porter won the Latin Grammy Award for Producer of the Year at the Latin Grammy Awards of 2001. "Cambia la Piel" was released as the fourth (promotional only) single from Sound Loaded in Spain and Latin America on October 15, 2001.

== Critical reception ==
Sal Cinquemani from Slant Magazine wrote that adding a Spanish-language original song "Cambia la Piel" to Sound Loaded was a good idea. He noted that Martin is better off singing in his native tongue, where his vocals seem more natural and less contrived. Jose F. Promis from AllMusic called it a sizzling track.

== Formats and track listings ==
Spanish promotional CD single

1. "Cambia la Piel" – 5:13

== Remix version ==
"Cambia la Piel" was remixed for the pLATINum Rhythm compilation, released by Madonna's Maverick company on October 30, 2001.

== Cover versions ==
The song was covered in 2003 by Jarabe de Palo, whose lead singer wrote "Cambia la Piel" for Martin in 2000. It was included on band's fifth album, Bonito.
