= Como Decirte Adiós =

Single by Ricky Martin

from the album A Medio Vivir
- Released: August 6, 1996
- Recorded: 1995
- Genre: Latin pop
- Length: 3:00
- Label: Sony Discos; Columbia
- Songwriter: Marco Flores
- Producers: K. C. Porter; Ian Blake

Ricky Martin singles chronology
"Fuego de Noche, Nieve de Día" (1996)	"Como Decirte Adiós" (1996)	"Bombón de Azúcar" (1996)

Audio
- "Ricky Martin - Como Decirte Adiós (Audio)" on YouTube

"Como Decirte Adiós" (English: "How Do I Tell You Goodbye") is the fifth single from Ricky Martin's album, A Medio Vivir (1995). It was released as a promotional single in the United States on August 6, 1996.

The song reached number seventeen on the Latin Pop Airplay in the United States.

== Formats and track listings ==
US promotional CD single

1. "Como Decirte Adiós" – 3:00

== Charts ==
Chart (1996)	Peak position
US Latin Pop Airplay (Billboard)	17
