= Go the Distance =

1997 song from Disney's Hercules

Song by Roger Bart

from the album Hercules: An Original Walt Disney Records Soundtrack
- Released: May 27, 1997
- Recorded: 1996
- Genre: Show tune
- Length: 3:14
- Label: Walt Disney
- Composer: Alan Menken
- Lyricist: David Zippel
- Producer: Alan Menken

"Go the Distance" is a song from Disney's 1997 animated feature film Hercules. It was written by composer Alan Menken and lyricist David Zippel, and originally recorded by American actor Roger Bart in his film role as the singing voice of Hercules. American singer-songwriter Michael Bolton recorded a pop version of the song for the film's end credits, which was also included on his eleventh studio album All That Matters (1997). Puerto Rican singer and actor Ricky Martin performed the Spanish version of the song, both in the movie and in the credits; this version is included on Martin's album Vuelve. Both the song and its reprise featured in a stage production of Hercules, performed upon the Disney Wonder during 2007/2008.

== Production ==
"Go the Distance" was one of two songs written for the character Hercules in the film. The second, "Shooting Star", failed to make the final cut. However, "Shooting Star" is included on the Hercules soundtrack CD, sung by Boyzone. The score for the original version of the song can be found in the Alan Menken Songbook.

== Critical reception ==
Christian Clemmensen of Filmtracks deemed "Go the Distance" to be Hercules's "only redeeming song" out of an unsatisfactory soundtrack. However, he criticized Roger Bart's version for his "whiny voice", which Clemmensen expressed had a tone that is "remarkably irritating", while he considered Michael Bolton's pop version to be "finely tuned".

The book Ways of Being Male felt that the phrase "go the distance" is a prime example of the way themes are "couched in the language of sport and competition" throughout the film. Den of Geek deemed it "one of Disney's great anthems/motivational mantras for all aspiring athletes and deities." Moviepilot suggests that the shooting star during "Go the Distance" is actually Aladdin and Jasmine's magic carpet ride. The Globe and Mail likened it to Duddy's "Leaving St. Urbain Street", while Boing Boing compared it to Pocahontas's "Just Around the Riverbend". Vulture deemed it "inspiring".

=== Awards and chart placings ===
The song was nominated for the Academy Award for Best Original Song and the Golden Globe Award for Best Original Song. Both awards, however, went to "My Heart Will Go On", a song by Celine Dion from Titanic, a film directed by James Cameron. "Go the Distance" peaked at #24 on the Billboard Hot 100 chart and went to #1 for 3 weeks on the Hot Adult Contemporary Tracks chart, Bolton's ninth song to top this chart.

== Versions ==
=== Film version ===
The song was recorded by American actor Roger Bart in his film role as the singing voice of Hercules.

"Go the Distance" is performed in the film by Hercules (age 15), who possesses god-like strength and finds it increasingly hard to fit in with his peers. The song serves as Hercules' prayer to the Gods to help him find where he truly belongs. His prayers are answered, as he is revealed to be the long-lost son of Zeus, king of the gods. Hercules is also told that he must become a true hero in order to rejoin his father on Mount Olympus. The number is later reprised when Hercules sets off on his quest to become a true hero, proclaiming that he wants to "go the distance" in order to prove himself.

=== Michael Bolton version ===
"Go the Distance"

Single by Michael Bolton

from the album Hercules: An Original Walt Disney Records Soundtrack and All That Matters
- Released: May 20, 1997
- Recorded: 1997
- Genre: Pop; pop rock; soft rock
- Length: 4:42
- Label: Walt Disney; Columbia
- Composer: Alan Menken
- Lyricist: David Zippel
- Producers: Walter Afanasieff; Michael Bolton

Michael Bolton singles chronology
"Fool for Love (Requiem pour un Fou)" (1996)	"Go the Distance" (1997)	"The Best of Love" (1997)

Licensed audio
- "Go the Distance" on YouTube

American singer-songwriter Michael Bolton recorded a pop version of the song for the film's end credits. This version, produced by Walter Afanasieff and Bolton himself, was later included on Bolton's eleventh studio album, All That Matters (1997). Bolton's version was released as a commercial single by Walt Disney Records on May 20, 1997. It peaked at number 24 on the US Billboard Hot 100.

The accompanying music video for Bolton's version was directed by Dani Jacobs. Sections of it were filmed in the Great Hall of the Brooklyn Museum and feature Bolton performing the song, intercut with scenes from Hercules. Vocal Spectrum, a barbershop quartet, did a cover version of this Bolton's version.

==== Credits and personnel ====
- Michael Bolton – lead vocals
- Walter Afanasieff – keyboards, synth bass
- Dan Shea – additional keyboards, computer programming
- David Gleeson – Synclavier programming
- Dann Huff – guitar, guitar solo
- Michael Landau – guitar
- John Robinson – drums
- Jeremy Lubbock – orchestra arrangement and conductor
- Jesse Levy – orchestra contractor
- Sandy Griffith – backing vocals
- Claytoven Richardson – backing vocals
- Jeanie Tracy – backing vocals

==== Charts ====
Chart (1997)	Peak position
US Billboard Hot 100	24

==== Certifications ====
Region	Certification	Certified units/sales
United States (RIAA)	Gold	500,000^{^}
^{^} Shipments figures based on certification alone.

=== Ricky Martin version ===
"No Importa la Distancia"

Single by Ricky Martin

from the album Hércules: Banda Sonora En Español and Vuelve
- Released: July 1, 1997
- Recorded: 1997
- Genre: Pop; pop rock; soft rock; latin pop; rock
- Length: 4:55
- Label: Walt Disney; Columbia
- Composer: Alan Menken
- Lyricist: Javier Pontón · Renato López
- Producers: KC Porter; Robi Draco Rosa

Ricky Martin singles chronology
"Nada es Imposible" (1997)	"No Importa la Distancia" (1997)	"Corazón" (1997)

Licensed audio
- "Ricky Martin - No Importa La Distancia (Go The Distance) (audio)" on YouTube

Ricky Martin recorded a Spanish-language version of "Go the Distance" from Hercules soundtrack, called "No Importa la Distancia" (English: "No Matter the Distance"). It was released as a single on July 1, 1997. Later, it was included on Martin's 1998 album Vuelve. A music video was also released. The song reached number ten on the Latin Pop Songs in the United States. Martin's version was met with unfavorable reactions from music critics. AllMusic's Jose F. Promis called "No Importa la Distancia" "pure schmaltz" In the San Antonio Express-News, Ramiro Burr found "No Importa la Distancia" to be "sappy", while The Dallas Morning News editor Mario Tarradell criticized the song as an "unwelcome dose of sugary pap".

==== Charts ====
Chart (1997)	Peak position
US Latin Pop Airplay (Billboard)	10

===== Formats and track listings =====
European CD single

1. "No Importa la Distancia" performed by Ricky Martin – 4:51
2. "Já Não Há Distancia" performed by Ricky Martin – 4:45

European CD maxi-single

1. "No Importa la Distancia" performed by Ricky Martin – 4:51
2. "Já Não Há Distancia" performed by Ricky Martin – 4:45
3. "Go the Distance" (Cast Version) performed by Roger Bart – 3:13

=== We Love Disney ===
The song was covered in different languages for the series We Love Disney by:

- Harrison Craig for We Love Disney, Australia in 2014
- Jean-Baptiste Maunier for We Love Disney, France 2 in 2014
- Andrea Nardinocchi for We Love Disney, Italy in 2015
- David Bisbal for We Love Disney, Latin America in 2016

== Certifications ==
Region	Certification	Certified units/sales
United Kingdom (BPI)	Silver	200,000^{‡}
United States (RIAA)	Platinum	1,000,000^{‡}
^{‡} Sales+streaming figures based on certification alone.

== Other appearances ==
In April 2020 during the COVID-19 pandemic, Disney Broadway Stars performed "Go the Distance" while self-isolating.

== See also ==
- List of Billboard Adult Contemporary number ones of 1997
