= Fuego de Noche, Nieve de Día =

Single by Ricky Martin

- Mexican 1996 promo single

Single by Ricky Martin

from the album A Medio Vivir
- Released: April 16, 1996
- Recorded: 1995
- Genre: Latin pop
- Length: 5:30
- Label: Sony Latin; Columbia
- Songwriters: Luis Gómez-Escolar; K. C. Porter; Ian Blake
- Producers: K. C. Porter; Ian Blake

Ricky Martin singles chronology
| "A Medio Vivir" (1996) | "Fuego de Noche, Nieve de Día" (1996) | "Como Decirte Adiós" (1996) |

Video
- "Fuego de Noche, Nieve de Día" on YouTube

"Fuego de Noche, Nieve de Día" (English: "Fire at Night, Snow by Day") is the fourth single from Ricky Martin's album, A Medio Vivir (1995). It was released as a promotional single in the United States on April 16, 1996.

A music video was shot by Gustavo Garzón in February 1996 in Mexico. It was included on La Historia DVD in 2001 and 17 DVD in 2008.

The music video tells the tragic love story of a young man (portrayed by Martin) and a young woman (portrayed by the Mexican actress Kate del Castillo) who is insane and locked in a bedlam. The story finishes with that woman's death, which makes the man feel so sad that he kills himself.

The song reached number twelve on the Latin Pop Airplay in the United States.

== Formats and track listings ==
Mexican promotional CD single

1. "Fuego de Noche, Nieve de Día" – 5:30

Italian promotional 7" single

1. "Fuego de Noche, Nieve de Día" (Edit) – 4:21

== Charts ==
=== Weekly charts ===
| Chart (1996) | Peak position |
|---|---|
| US Latin Pop Airplay (Billboard) | 12 |

=== Year-end charts ===
| Chart (2017) | Position |
|---|---|
| Honduras Pop (Monitor Latino) | 82 |

| Chart (2023) | Position |
|---|---|
| Puerto Rico Pop (Monitor Latino) | 21 |
