= Bombón de Azúcar (song) =

- Mexican 1996 promo single

Single by Ricky Martin

from the album A Medio Vivir
- Released: October 15, 1996
- Recorded: 1995
- Genre: Latin pop
- Length: 4:58
- Label: Columbia
- Songwriters: Mark Kilpatrick; Gustavo Laureano; Carlos Figueroa; John Lengel; Carlos Rolón
- Producers: K. C. Porter; Ian Blake

Ricky Martin singles chronology
"Como Decirte Adiós" (1996)	"Bombón de Azúcar" (1996)	"Diana" (1996)

Audio
- "Ricky Martin - Bombón De Azúcar (Audio)" on YouTube

"Bombón de Azúcar" (English: "Sugar Bonbon") is the sixth single from Ricky Martin's album, A Medio Vivir (1995). It was released as a promotional single in the United States on October 15, 1996 and in August 1997 in Spain.

The song reached number twelve on the Latin Pop Airplay in the United States.

The remixes of "Bombón de Azúcar" were produced by Carlos Gutierrez and Marco Figueroa, and featured on the promotional single in 1996. Two of them were included later on the commercial singles in Europe: "María" and "Te Extraño, Te Olvido, Te Amo."

"Bombón de Azúcar" was written by La Secta AllStar in 1995 for Martin. In 1999, the band covered the song on Bombón de Azúcar album. It was also covered by salsa and fellow Puerto Rican singer Charlie Cruz on his debut album Imagínate (1999). His version peaked at number 3 on the Tropical Songs chart.

== Formats and track listings ==
US/Mexican promotional CD single

1. "Bombón de Azúcar" – 4:58
2. "Bombón de Azúcar" (M+M Classic Club Mix) – 6:14
3. "Bombón de Azúcar" (M+M Classic Radio Mix) – 4:18
4. "Bombón de Azúcar" (Disco Solution Remix) – 7:09
5. "Bombón de Azúcar" (Disco Solution Radio Edit) – 4:10
6. "Bombón de Azúcar" (Disco Solution Dream Dub) – 5:20

== Charts ==
Chart (1996–1997)	Peak position
Spain (Top 40 Radio)	16
US Latin Pop Airplay (Billboard)	12
