= Corazón (Ricky Martin song) =

- Finnish 1997 maxi-single

Single by Ricky Martin

from the album A Medio Vivir
- Released: October 27, 1997
- Recorded: 1995
- Genre: Latin pop
- Length: 4:20
- Label: Columbia
- Songwriters: K. C. Porter; L. Angel
- Producers: K. C. Porter; Ian Blake

Ricky Martin singles chronology
"No Importa La Distancia" (1997)	"Corazón" (1997)	"Vuelve" (1998)

Audio
- "Ricky Martin - Corazon (audio)" on YouTube

"Corazón" (English: "Heart") is a song performed by Ricky Martin, included on his album, A Medio Vivir (1995). It was released as a single in Finland on October 27, 1997, after the success of "Maria".

The song peaked at number twenty on The Official Finnish Charts.

"Corazon" was remixed for the single release by Finnish record producer, JS16. He gained fame by being the producer of the Finnish rap/electro group, Bomfunk MC's.

== Formats and track listings ==
Finnish CD single

1. "Corazón" (Samba Remix)
2. "Corazón" (Radio Remix) – 4:06

Finnish CD maxi-single

1. "Corazón" (Samba Remix)
2. "Corazón" (Radio Remix) – 4:06
3. "Corazón" (Extended Remix)
4. "Corazón" (Original Album Version) – 4:20

== Charts ==
Chart (1997)	Peak position
Finland (Suomen virallinen lista)	20
