= Hercules (soundtrack) =

Hercules: An Original Walt Disney Records Soundtrack

Soundtrack album by Various artists
- Released: May 27, 1997
- Recorded: 1996–1997
- Genres: Pop; gospel
- Length: 47:56
- Label: Walt Disney
- Producer: Alan Menken

Singles from Hercules: An Original Walt Disney Records Soundtrack
- 1. "Go the Distance" Released: May 27, 1997

Professional ratings
Review scores
Source	Rating
Allmusic	3/5 stars
Filmtracks	1/5 stars
Sputnikmusic	3.5/5

Hercules: An Original Walt Disney Records Soundtrack is the soundtrack to the 1997 Disney animated feature film Hercules. It contains the songs from the film composed by Alan Menken and David Zippel, as well as the film's score composed by Alan Menken, and the score was orchestrated by Danny Troob and Michael Starobin, with vocals performed by Lillias White, LaChanze, Roz Ryan, Roger Bart, Danny DeVito, and Susan Egan among others. The album also includes the single version of "Go the Distance" by Michael Bolton.

== Background ==
In 1994, David Zippel was attached to write the lyrics for the songs for the film, collaborating with Alan Menken. Zippel had previously collaborated with Menken on the cabaret revue titled It's Better With a Band, and the musical Diamonds, directed by Harold Prince. Distinctively for the film, the idea to incorporate gospel music for the songs was suggested by co-screenwriter and co-director John Musker, although Menken preferred "something very classic and Greek—a Candide approach". Musker explained, "Gospel is a storytelling kind of music. It can be exhilarating, especially when it gets everybody on their feet. We were looking for a modern equivalent for the Greek references and this style of music seemed to be entertaining and a real departure at the same time." The Spice Girls were originally approached to portray the Muses following an invitation to sing one of the songs, but declined the offer due to scheduling conflicts.

For the single version of "Go the Distance", Michael Bolton was personally chosen by Menken to record the song, in which Columbia Records paid an undisclosed figure to Walt Disney Records for the rights to the soundtrack. For the Spanish version of the film, "Go the Distance" was redone by Ricky Martin and released as a single under the title "No Importa La Distancia" and was also very successful, both inside and outside the United States. In the Turkish version of the film, "Go the Distance" was sung by Tarkan, who also performed the vocals for the adult Hercules. "Go the Distance" was nominated for both the Academy Award for Best Original Song and the Golden Globe Award for Best Original Song, but ultimately lost both to Celine Dion's hit "My Heart Will Go On" from Titanic.

Belinda Carlisle recorded two versions of "I Won't Say (I'm in Love)" as well as a music video for promotional purposes. Though the English version eventually opted not to use it, several foreign dubs have it in place of the reprise of "Go the Distance" in the ending credits. These dubs include, but are not limited to, the Swedish one, the Finnish one, the Icelandic one, the Russian one, and the Ukrainian one. The DVD release of the Swedish dub has replaced it with the reprise of "Go the Distance".

== Track listing ==
All lyrics are written by David Zippel; all music is composed by Alan Menken.

No.	Title	Performer(s)	Length
1.	"Long Ago..."	Charlton Heston	0:30
2.	"The Gospel Truth I/Main Title"	Lillias White, LaChanze, Roz Ryan, Cheryl Freeman and Vaneese Thomas	2:25
3.	"The Gospel Truth II"	Roz Ryan	0:59
4.	"The Gospel Truth III"	Lillias White, LaChanze, Roz Ryan, Cheryl Freeman and Vaneese Thomas	1:05
5.	"Go the Distance"	Roger Bart	3:14
6.	"Oh Mighty Zeus"		0:46
7.	"Go the Distance (Reprise)"	Roger Bart	0:57
8.	"One Last Hope"	Danny DeVito	3:00
9.	"Zero to Hero"	Tawatha Agee, Lillias White, LaChanze, Roz Ryan, Cheryl Freeman and Vaneese Thomas	2:20
10.	"I Won't Say (I'm in Love)"	Susan Egan	2:20
11.	"A Star Is Born"	Lillias White, LaChanze, Roz Ryan, Cheryl Freeman and Vaneese Thomas	2:04
12.	"Go the Distance (Single)"	Michael Bolton	4:42
13.	"The Big Olive"		1:07
14.	"The Prophecy"		0:53
15.	"Destruction of the Agora"		2:07
16.	"Phil's Island"		2:25
17.	"Rodeo"		0:39
18.	"Speak of the Devil"		1:30
19.	"The Hydra Battle"		3:28
20.	"Meg's Garden"		1:14
21.	"Hercules' Villa"		0:37
22.	"All Time Chump"		0:38
23.	"Cutting the Thread"		3:23
24.	"A True Hero/A Star Is Born (Finale)"	Lillias White, LaChanze, Roz Ryan, Cheryl Freeman and Vaneese Thomas	5:33
Total length:			47:56

== Charts and certifications ==
=== Album charts ===
Chart (1997)	Peak position
Canada Top Albums/CDs (RPM)	88
US Billboard 200	37

Chart (2026)	Peak position
US Kid Albums (Billboard)	19

=== Single charts ===
Year	Single	Artist	Chart	Position
1997	"Go the Distance"	Michael Bolton	Billboard Hot 100	24

=== Album certifications ===
Region	Certification	Certified units/sales
Canada (Music Canada)	Gold	50,000^{^}
United Kingdom (BPI)	Silver	60,000^{‡}
United States (RIAA)	Gold	500,000^{^}
^{^} Shipments figures based on certification alone.^{‡} Sales+streaming figures based on certification alone.
