= Te Extraño, Te Olvido, Te Amo =

Single by Ricky Martin

Single by Ricky Martin

from the album A Medio Vivir
- Language: Spanish
- B-side: "María"; "Bombón de Azúcar"; "Somos La Semilla"; "Dónde Estarás"
- Released: September 5, 1995
- Studio: World Beat Recording (Calabasas, California); A&M Studios (Hollywood, California); Ocean Way Recording (Los Angeles); Crescent Moon Studios (Miami, Florida)
- Genre: Soft rock
- Length: 4:39
- Label: Columbia
- Songwriter: Carlos Lara
- Producer: K.C. Porter

Ricky Martin singles chronology
| "No Me Pidas Mas" (1994) | "Te Extraño, Te Olvido, Te Amo" (1995) | "María" (1995) |

Music video
- "Te Extraño, Te Olvido, Te Amo" on YouTube

Alternative cover
- Cover artwork used in Mexico

"Te Extraño, Te Olvido, Te Amo" (transl. "I Miss You, I Forget You, I Love You") is a song recorded by Puerto Rican singer Ricky Martin for his third studio album, A Medio Vivir (1995). The song was written by Carlos Lara, while the production was handled by K.C. Porter. It was released to radio stations and on CD by Columbia Records as the lead single from the album on September 5, 1995. A Spanish language soft ballad, it is about the singer's dream woman who has left him and as he struggles to forget her, he becomes depressed. It received widely positive reviews from music critics, who ranked it among Martin's best ballads.

"Te Extraño, Te Olvido, Te Amo" was commercially successful, reaching the top 10 in France and Belgium, as well as Billboard's Hot Latin Tracks chart in the United States. The first accompanying music video, aired in 1995, was directed by Gustavo Garzón and filmed in Los Angeles, California. It won the award for Video of the Year at the 1996 Premio Lo Nuestro. The second video, aired in 1997, was directed by Christophe Gstalder and filmed in France; it depicts Martin chasing after a woman and watching her from the window with binoculars. The track was included on the set lists for Martin's the A Medio Vivir Tour, the One World Tour, and the Movimiento Tour.

Several artists have covered "Te Extraño, Te Olvido, Te Amo", including Los Socios Del Ritmo and Chiquis Rivera. Their version in the style of cumbia was released for digital download and streaming by Universal Music Mexico on February 14, 2020, as the second single from the band's album, La Cumbia Es Lo De Hoy (2021). The song was nominated for Regional Mexican – Cumbia Song of the Year at the 33rd Annual Premio Lo Nuestro and entered Billboard's Mexico Popular Airplay chart.

== Background and composition ==
"Te Extraño, Te Olvido, Te Amo"
A 27-second sample of the chorus

"Te Extraño, Te Olvido, Te Amo" was written by Carlos Lara for Ricky Martin's third studio album, A Medio Vivir (1995). Lara describes it as "an emotional conundrum with affirmations emanating from feeling and almost profiled towards passion". Musically, the song is a Spanish language soft ballad, produced by K.C. Porter. It runs for a total of 4 minutes and 39 seconds. Lyrically, "Te Extraño, Te Olvido, Te Amo" which translates to "I Miss You, I Forget You, I Love You" in English, is a romantic song about the singer's dream woman who has left him and as he struggles to forget her, he becomes depressed. The lyrics include: "Te extraño porque vive en mi tu recuerdo te olvido / A cada minuto lo intento te amo es que ya no tengo remedio / Te extraño, te olvido y te amo de nuevo" (I miss you because your memory lives in me I forget you / Every minute I try I love you is that I have no choice / I miss you, I forget you and I love you again).

== Release ==
Columbia Records released "Te Extraño, Te Olvido, Te Amo" to radio stations and on CD on September 5, 1995, as the lead single from A Medio Vivir in the United States and Latin America. Following the success of Martin's next single, "María" in European countries, "Te Extraño, Te Olvido, Te Amo" was released as a CD single in Europe on September 9, 1997. The European standard single includes "Te Extraño, Te Olvido, Te Amo" and two remixes of "Bombón de Azúcar". The French edition contains "Te Extraño, Te Olvido, Te Amo" and "Somos la Semilla", while the German edition includes both album version and radio edit of "Te Extraño, Te Olvido, Te Amo" as well as three versions of "Dónde Estarás". "Te Extraño, Te Olvido, Te Amo" was included as the fourth track on A Medio Vivir, released September 12, 1995. The song was also later added to Martin's compilation albums La Historia (2001), 17 (2008), Greatest Hits: Souvenir Edition (2013), Personalidad (2015), and Esencial (2018).

== Critical reception ==
"Te Extraño, Te Olvido, Te Amo" has been met with widely positive reviews from music critics. Natalia Pignato and Umatilla High of the Orlando Sentinel labeled the song "a soft but strong ballad". In 2015, Univision staff ranked the track as Martin's fourth-best ballad, while Claudia González Alvarado from Chilango ranked it as his third-best ballad in 2021, calling it a "jewel". An author of ¡Hola! named the song a "megahit". Happyfm staff listed the track among the singer's greatest hits, stating that he is "capable of tearing the soul" and the song is "absolutely magical, from start to finish". MTV Argentina also ranked it as one of Martin's best songs in 2020.

=== Accolades ===
In her review for Cadena Dial in 2020, Nuria Serena listed "Te Extraño, Te Olvido, Te Amo" among "a handful of good songs that speak of love to make this Valentine's Day very special for you". The track was recognized as one of the best-performing songs of the year on the Pop/Ballad field at the 1996 American Society of Composers, Authors and Publishers (ASCAP) Latin Awards.

== Commercial performance ==
"Te Extraño, Te Olvido, Te Amo" is one of Martin's most commercially successful songs in his career. In the United States, the song debuted at number 13 on Billboard's Hot Latin Tracks chart on September 23, 1995, becoming Martin's eighth entry on the chart. It subsequently peaked at number nine on the chart issue dated October 21, 1995, giving Martin his fourth top 10 hit. The song also reached numbers two and nine on the US Latin Pop Songs and Tropical/Salsa charts, respectively. Besides the United States, the single topped the ballads chart in Mexico. In Europe, along with "María", "Te Extraño, Te Olvido, Te Amo" was one of Martin's first successful hits and made him popular significantly in Spain. The song reached number 17 on the European Hot 100 Singles chart. In France, the track peaked at number four and was certified gold by the Syndicat National de l'Édition Phonographique (SNEP), denoting sales of over 250,000 copies in the country. It also peaked at number four on the Ultratop Wallonia chart of Belgium and was certified gold by the Belgian Entertainment Association (BEA), denoting sales of over 25,000 copies in the country. Without physical release, "Te Extraño, Te Olvido, Te Amo" was ineligible to chart in Spain, but it peaked at number two on the country's Top 40 Radio chart.

== Promotion ==
=== Music videos ===
A screenshot from the music video, depicting Martin watching a woman from the window.

The first accompanying music video was directed by Argentine director Gustavo Garzón and filmed in Los Angeles, California. The visual was aired in 1995 and won the award for Video of the Year at the 8th Premio Lo Nuestro. The second video was shot in August 1997 in France and was directed by Christophe Gstalder. It depicts Martin chasing after a woman and watching her from the window with binoculars. The video was uploaded on the singer's YouTube channel on October 3, 2009. Cristal Mesa from mitú named the visual Martin's fourth-best music video on her 2018 list, calling its sentiment "so sweet".

=== Live performances ===
"Te Extraño, Te Olvido, Te Amo" was included on the set lists for Martin's the A Medio Vivir Tour, the One World Tour, and the Movimiento Tour. He also performed the track along with his other hits during the 37th and 61st editions of the Viña del Mar International Song Festival in 1996 and 2020, respectively. He performed medleys of "Te Extraño, Te Olvido, Te Amo" and "María" at the 1996 Premios ERES and the Miss World 1997.

== Cover versions and appearances in media ==
"Te Extraño, Te Olvido, Te Amo" has been covered by several artists. As part of the Latin Recording Academy tribute to Martin, who was presented with the Person of the Year accolade in 2006, fellow Puerto Rican musician Luis Fonsi performed a live rendition of "Te Extraño, Te Olvido, Te Amo". Cumbia pop band Los Totora covered the song as a part of their live album, Y Ahora... Vivo (En Vivo) (2012). Florencia Álvarez performed the song on the Latin American singing competition television series Talento FOX in 2018. Mexican singer-songwriter Ximena Sariñana performed the track as an Amazon Original hit. She told Remezcla that Martin has inspired her and was an "idol" throughout her childhood and A Medio Vivir "was one of those albums that [she] could never let go of". She has "always wanted to pay tribute to it, and this was the perfect way to do it". During interviews with BELatina and Crónica, she expressed that she has "been a huge Ricky Martin fan" since early child hood and she thinks that the song is "too emblematic" of her generation, being "a theme of love". The cover version was released on February 11, 2022. Holly Alvarado of Remezcla described the song as "dynamic" and stated: "With grand strings accompanying the melody, Sariñana's voice shifts into a harmonious gesture that feels tender and heartbreakingly honest in one breath."

=== Los Socios Del Ritmo and Chiquis Rivera version ===
"Te Extraño, Te Olvido, Te Amo"

Single by Los Socios Del Ritmo and Chiquis Rivera

from the album La Cumbia Es Lo De Hoy
- Language: Spanish
- Released: February 14, 2020
- Genre: Cumbia
- Length: 3:39
- Label: Universal Music Mexico
- Producer: Javier Calderón

Los Socios Del Ritmo singles chronology
| "El Año Viejo" (2019) | "Te Extraño, Te Olvido, Te Amo" (2020) | "Te Vi Partir" (2020) |

Chiquis Rivera singles chronology
| "Martes Es Muy Lejos" (2019) | "Te Extraño, Te Olvido, Te Amo" (2020) | "Ticket De Salida" (2020) |

Music video
- "Te Extraño, Te Olvido, Te Amo" on YouTube

"Te Extraño, Te Olvido, Te Amo" was covered by Mexican band Los Socios Del Ritmo and American singer Chiquis Rivera for the band's album, La Cumbia Es Lo De Hoy (2021). The song was released for digital download and streaming by Universal Music Mexico on February 14, 2020, as the second single from the album. A cumbia song, it was produced by Javier Calderón. During an interview with El Siglo de Torreón, Mauricio González of Los Socios Del Ritmo explained: "We are working on our album with new versions of emblematic songs that have marked generations and that had not been made in cumbia." Therefore, the band picked "Te Extraño, Te Olvido, Te Amo", as the song that "made Ricky Martin famous" to cover in their own style. González also told the newspaper about collaborating with Rivera: "She is a very mediatic girl, current, current, and even when people place her more by the scandals, she is a great person, especially with great talent, which is why we are happy with the result of the new product."

An accompanying music video, released simultaneously with the song is available on the band's YouTube channel and Facebook Watch. The track was nominated for Regional Mexican – Cumbia Song of the Year at the 33rd Annual Premio Lo Nuestro, but lost to "Tú y Yo" by Raymix and Paulina Rubio. "Te Extraño, Te Olvido, Te Amo" debuted and peaked at number 27 on Billboard's Mexico Popular Airplay on March 14, 2020, becoming Los Socios Del Ritmo's second and Rivera's fifth entry on the chart.

==== Track listing ====
Digital download / streaming
| No. | Title | Length |
|---|---|---|
| 1. | "Te Extraño, Te Olvido, Te Amo" | 3:39 |

==== Credits and personnel ====
Credits adapted from Tidal.

- Joaquín Salamanca – associated performer, voice
- Chiquis – associated performer, voice
- Javier Calderón – associated performer, producer, guitar, recording arranger, recording engineer
- Edelmiro Puc – associated performer, clarinet
- Luis Antonio Ruíz – associated performer, accordion, piano
- Federico Barragán – associated performer, vocal bass
- Edwin de la Rosa – associated performer, drums
- Mauricio Gonzalez – associated performer, conga
- Carlos Lara Galvan – composer, lyricist
- Alex Ponce – mastering engineer, mixing engineer

==== Charts ====
Weekly peak performance for "Te Extraño, Te Olvido, Te Amo"
| Chart (2020) | Peak position |
|---|---|
| Mexico Popular Airplay (Billboard) | 27 |

== Formats and track listings ==
- Argentine promotional CD
1. "Te Extraño, Te Olvido, Te Amo" – 4:41
2. "María" – 4:23
- European CD maxi-single
1. "Te Extraño, Te Olvido, Te Amo" – 4:41
2. "Bombon de Azucar" (M&N Classic Club Mix) – 6:14
3. "Bombon de Azucar" (The Disco Dream Dub) – 5:20
- French CD
1. "Te Extraño, Te Olvido, Te Amo" – 4:41
2. "Somos La Semilla" – 3:56
- German CD maxi-single
1. "Te Extraño, Te Olvido, Te Amo" (Radio Edit) – 3:58
2. "Te Extraño, Te Olvido, Te Amo" (Album Version) – 4:41
3. "Dónde Estarás" (Radio Edit) – 3:43
4. "Dónde Estarás" (Extended Remix) – 4:45
5. "Dónde Estarás" (PM Project Extended Remix) – 6:10
- Mexican / Spanish promotional CD
1. "Te Extraño, Te Olvido, Te Amo" – 4:41

== Credits and personnel ==
Credits are adapted from Tidal and the US maxi-CD single liner notes.

Studio locations

- Recorded at World Beat Recording (Calabasas, California), A&M Studios (Hollywood, California), Ocean Way Recording (Los Angeles), and Crescent Moon Studios (Miami, Florida)

Personnel

- Ricky Martin – vocal, associated performer
- Carlos Lara – composer, lyricist
- K.C. Porter – producer, associated performer, director, drums, engineer, keyboards, piano
- Ian Blake – associated performer, co-producer, drums, engineer, keyboards
- Frank Marocco – accordion
- Tim Pierce – acoustic guitar
- Michael Thompson – acoustic guitar, guitar
- Diego De Pietri – assistant engineer
- Eddie Miller – assistant engineer
- Leslie Ann Jones – assistant engineer
- Mike Aarvold – assistant engineer, mixing engineer
- June Murakawa – assistant engineer
- Sebastian Krys – assistant engineer
- Chris Vela – assistant engineer
- Della Miles – associated performer
- Wil Wheaton – associated performer
- Sue-Ann Carwell – associated performer
- Stella Payton – associated performer
- Philip Ingram – associated performer
- Jackie Gouche Farris – associated performer
- Maxi Anderson – associated performer
- Mona Lisa Young – associated performer
- Gustavo Laureano – associated performer
- Terry Bradford – associated performer
- Maxayn Lewis – associated performer
- Bridgette Bryant – associated performer
- Tony Warren – associated performer
- Terry Steele – associated performer
- Ricky Nelson – associated performer
- Alex Brown – associated performer
- Jessica Williams – associated performer
- Anita Sherman – associated performer
- Néil Stubenhaus – bass
- Lee Sklar – bass
- Jeremy Lubbock – director
- Ralf Stemmann – drums, engineer, keyboards, piano
- Dennie Fongheiser – drums
- Mike Baird – drums
- Vinnie Colaiuta – drums
- Don Hahn – engineer
- John Lengel – engineer
- Michael Landau – guitar
- Randy Waldman – keyboards, piano
- Claude Gaudette – keyboards, piano
- Robbie Buchanan – keyboards, piano
- Brian Gardner – mastering engineer
- Kathy Yore – mixing engineer
- Benny Faccone – mixing engineer, recording engineer
- Luis Conte – percussion
- Sam Riney – saxophone

== Charts ==
=== Weekly charts ===
Weekly peak performance for "Te Extraño, Te Olvido, Te Amo"
| Chart (1995–1998) | Peak position |
|---|---|
| Belgium (Ultratip Bubbling Under Flanders) | 13 |
| Belgium (Ultratop 50 Wallonia) | 4 |
| Bolivia (UPI) | 5 |
| Chile (UPI) | 5 |
| El Salvador (UPI) | 2 |
| European Hot 100 Singles (Billboard) | 17 |
| Finland (Finnish Top 50 Hits) | 26 |
| France (SNEP) | 4 |
| Mexico (UPI) | 1 |
| Mexico Ballads (UPI) | 1 |
| Panama (UPI) | 1 |
| Peru (UPI) | 2 |
| Puerto Rico (UPI) | 2 |
| Spain (Top 40 Radio) | 2 |
| Switzerland (Schweizer Hitparade) | 19 |
| US Hot Latin Songs (Billboard) | 9 |
| US Latin Pop Airplay (Billboard) | 2 |
| US Tropical Airplay (Billboard) | 9 |
| Venezuela (UPI) | 1 |

Weekly peak performance for "Te Extraño, Te Olvido, Te Amo"
| Chart (2018–2021) | Peak position |
|---|---|
| Nicaragua Pop (Monitor Latino) | 6 |

=== Year-end charts ===
1995 year-end chart performance for "Te Extraño, Te Olvido, Te Amo"
| Chart (1995) | Position |
|---|---|
| US Latin Pop Airplay (Billboard) | 15 |

1997 year-end chart performance for "Te Extraño, Te Olvido, Te Amo"
| Chart (1997) | Position |
|---|---|
| Belgium (Ultratop 50 Wallonia) | 26 |
| France (SNEP) | 27 |

2020 year-end chart performance for "Te Extraño, Te Olvido, Te Amo"
| Chart (2020) | Position |
|---|---|
| Nicaragua Pop (Monitor Latino) | 84 |

2021 year-end chart performance for "Te Extraño, Te Olvido, Te Amo"
| Chart (2021) | Position |
|---|---|
| Nicaragua Pop (Monitor Latino) | 94 |

== Certifications ==
Certifications and sales for "Te Extraño, Te Olvido, Te Amo"
| Region | Certification | Certified units/sales |
|---|---|---|
| Belgium (BRMA) | Gold | 25,000^{*} |
| France (SNEP) | Gold | 250,000^{*} |
^{*} Sales figures based on certification alone.

== Release history ==
Release dates and formats for "María"
| Region | Date | Format(s) | Label | Ref. |
|---|---|---|---|---|
| Mexico | September 5, 1995 | Promotional CD single | Columbia Records | |
| Europe | September 12, 1997 | CD single | Columbia Records | |
| France | September 12, 1997 | CD single | TriStar Music | |

== See also ==
- 1995 in music
- French Top 100 singles of the 1990s
