= KC Porter =

American record producer

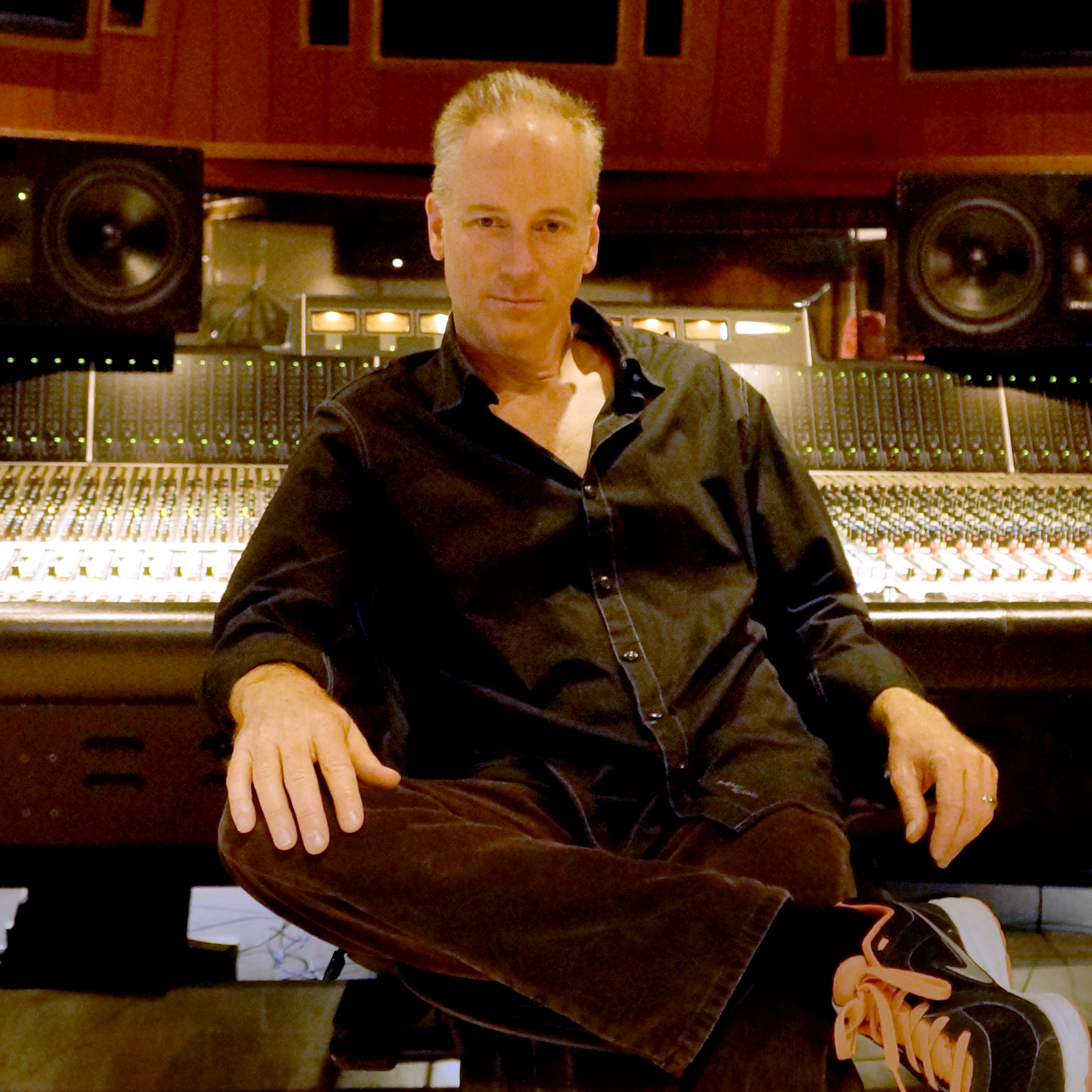
- KC Porter 2019

Background information
- Born: Karl Cameron Porter; June 27, 1962 (age 64); Encino, California, United States
- Genres: Argentine rock, Latin rock, Latin pop, R&B, Pop, Latin alternative, World
- Occupations: Record producer, songwriter, musician, arranger, singer, composer
- Instruments: Piano, Keyboards
- Years active: 1980–present
- Labels: Insignia Records, Altafonte
- Website: www.kcporter.com

Karl Cameron Porter, known as K.C (born June 27, 1962), is an American record producer, singer-songwriter, arranger and composer, winner of six Grammy Awards and two Latin Grammy Awards. Porter has worked on more than 40 albums, including production work on Santana's album Supernatural and has written some of the most popular Spanish-language singles released by Ricky Martin.

Porter is also known for his production work that includes artists such as Bon Jovi, Janet Jackson, Brian McKnight, Toni Braxton, and Scorpions; into the Spanish-speaking market and World music with artists such as Los Fabulosos Cadillacs, Laura Pausini, Khaled, Kadim Al Sahir; as well as into the international market (with artists such as Cheng Lin).

A practitioner of the Baháʼí Faith, Porter is one of the founding members of Oneness, a non-profit organization that promotes racial unity through music, the arts and education.

== Early life ==
Porter was born in Encino, California. His father, Bob, played trumpet, and wrote the music for the TV series Lassie, while mother Marcelyn was a script girl for I Love Lucy. In 1970, at age 7, his family moved to Guatemala, where they were Baháʼí pioneers. While growing up in Guatemala, Porter learned Spanish and about Latin culture which included spending time with Guatemalan musicians who exposed him to the sounds of marimba, and other Latin musical genres, as well as American pop and rock. At 11, he began piano lessons, and at 17 returned to the United States to major in music at Cal State Stanislaus.

== Musical career ==
=== 1980–1989: A&M Records, and breakthrough ===
While still studying at the university, Porter became a staff arranger at A&M Records when the label opened a Latin division called AyM Discos in 1982. There, he met Juan Carlos Calderon, the composer and arranger for Mexican singer Luis Miguel. This led the way for Porter's production of Maria Conchita Alonso's albums, Mírame and Hazme Sentir. Other artists he worked with at A&M include La Mafia, Emmanuel (singer), Luis Angel and Luis Miguel.

Porter translated and produced Janet Jackson's song, "Come Back to Me", when she recorded that Spanish version for an A&M release called "Vuelve a Mi". In addition to working with Spanish-speaking artists, this period marked the beginning of his career of writing, translating and producing recordings for English-speaking artists including Grover Washington Jr. and Phyllis Hyman ("Sacred Kind of Love"), Nancy Wilson ("That's What I Remember"), and Anne Murray ("Are you Still in Love With Me").

"I think I understand more than a lot of people what it's like as a native English speaker to have to learn Spanish," he told the Los Angeles Times. "I know how to teach people to pronounce the words. I feel like right now I'm kind of sharing with the people of the United States the excitement I felt hearing all of these Latin rhythms for the first time."

=== 1990–1998: Ricky Martin, Selena, and Los Fabulosos Cadillacs ===
Porter continued the work begun in the '80s into the next decade by writing for Luis Enrique. He produced Ana Gabriel, and Ednita Nazario. He went on to produce a total of three more Nazario albums in the coming years.

In 1991, Porter produced the first album for the nine-piece Argentine band Los Fabulosos Cadillacs. Called El León, the album included performances by Flaco Jimenez, Luis Conte and Gustavo Santaolalla. The next year, when the band finished touring, he put together a 17-track greatest hits package with two bonus tracks, "Quinto Centenario" and "Matador" (which has become a classic song in Argentina, and something of a latinamerican popular hymn), eventually contributing to double-platinum sales.

Late in 1993, Tejano singer Selena and New York Latin pop band the Barrio Boyzz, met in Porter's studio to record together the song "Donde Quiera Que Estés." Written by Porter and Marco A. Flores, and produced by Porter, the song debuted at number one on the Billboard Hot Latin chart in March 1994. Porter also produced songs on other Selena albums: Amor Prohibido ("Donde Quiera que Estes"), and her English-language crossover album, Dreaming of You ("Wherever You Are"). In addition, he produced "Where did the Feeling Go?", "Is it the Beat?" and "Only Love" for the Selena movie soundtrack.

That year, Porter formed a partnership with Ricky Martin and joined producer Robi Rosa to write most of Martin's album A Medio Vivir. That album, produced by Porter, included the single, "Maria", a hit that he co-wrote and sold three million copies. Its follow-up album, Vuelve, another Porter production, sold more than seven million copies. A song from Vuelve, called "The Cup of Life", was used as the anthem of the World Cup France '98, and went to number one in China, Australia, Mexico, and Germany, among other countries. Martin and Porter continued to work together including on the popular eponymous album, Ricky Martin, the Puerto Rican singer's English debut in May 1999, that is one of the best-selling albums of all time and has sold more than 22 million copies, worldwide.

Porter continued the work crossing over English-language artists into the Spanish market by translating Boyz II Men's "End of the Road" and producing the track for them in 1993. He did the same with Toni Braxton's hit song, "Un-break My Heart," and then recorded her Spanish version of it, "Regresa a Mi", in October 1996.

The 1997, Porter-produced Fabulosos Calavera album from Los Fabulosos Cadillacs, won the 1998 Grammy for Best Alternative Latin Rock Group Album, the first time that the National Academy of Recorded Arts and Sciences rewarded rock in Spanish. A year later, the band won the Latin Grammy Award for Best Rock Group for the album, La Marcha del Golazo Solitario, which he also produced.

=== 1999–2002: Santana, Grammy Awards, and Michael Jackson ===
Porter began writing with Carlos Santana in 1997, and when the latter was recording his Supernatural album, two songs from those earlier sessions—"Corazon Espinado" and "Migra"—were included on it. Porter co-produced the album and it was released in June 1999.

"The achingly tender singer on 'Primavera', a cut on Santana's hit Supernatural album, is Porter. Carlos Santana had planned to get a well-known singer for the song, one of two Porter wrote for the album, but says no one sang it as well as Porter."

Supernatural reached number one on the US album charts two separate times that year, sold over 15 million copies in the United States, 30 million worldwide, and was Album of the Year at the 41st Annual Grammy Awards ceremony in 1999. In addition to this award, Porter also won a Latin Grammy that year for his production of "Corazon Espinado" on Supernatural.

Porter then teamed up with Rami Yacoub and Andreas Carlsson, notably Swedish Songwriters from the hugely successful production site Cheiron from Stockholm. Together they composed a Latin styled pop song ("Soledad") for Westlife's second studio album, Coast to Coast, which was released in 2000. Porter's co-produced Italian singer Laura Pausini's album Entre Tu y Mil Mares, which was nominated for Best Female Pop Vocal Album at the Latin Grammy Awards. The single he worked on was "un error de los grandes." The next year, Porter worked again with Pausini on her first English-language album, From the Inside. The album, which he also co-produced and executive produced, was released in November.

LARAS, the Latin Academy of Recording Arts & Sciences named Porter the Producer of the Year in 2001.

Just one month after the attacks on the World Trade Center in 2001, Porter joined Michael Jackson to work on the Spanish version benefit single, "What More Can I Give". Porter oversaw the recording, which included Spanish-speaking artists Ricky Martin, Shakira, Alejandro Sanz, Luis Miguel, Christian Castro, Carlos Santana, and others. He also coached the English-language artists to sing in Spanish—members of NSYNC (Justin Timberlake, JC Chasez, Joey Fatone, Lance Bass, Chris Kirkpatrick), Mariah Carey, Celine Dion, and Jackson as well. Proceeds from "What More Can I Give" sales—both English and Spanish versions—went to various September 11 relief efforts.

In 2002, salsa singer La India, who Porter called "the new surprise of Latin America," released her Latin Songbird: Mi Alma y Corazón album, which he produced along with Emilio Estefan Jr., and Isidro Infante. She expanded her musical style by recording both a Spanish and an English version of the song, "sedúceme". Porter's pop version in Spanish went to number one on the Billboard Latin Singles chart.

Porter continued his professional work with Santana by producing "One of These Days" featuring Ozomatli on his Shaman album released in 2002.

Throughout the decade, Porter continued to cross over mainstream artists to the Spanish-language markets with productions of songs by Jerry Rivera ("Primavera" with Santana), Bon Jovi ("Bed of Roses" and "This Ain't A Love Song"), Janet Jackson ("Come Back to Me"), Brian McKnight, ("Back at One"), Scorpions ("Winds of Change"), Geri Halliwell ("Mi Chico Latino"), Sting ("Mad About You"), and others.

=== 2003–2010: Embracing the world ===
To honor the memory of the late Celia Cruz, Porter wrote "When You Smile," a song that Patti LaBelle recorded and he produced. The song, which appeared on Labelle's May 2004 album, Timeless Journey, featured Latinos Carlos Santana, Andy Vargas, Sheila E and La India. The album sold half a million copies and was certified gold. "'When You Smile' is fueled by Latin-grooved percussion from tub-thumper Sheila E. and a serpentinely sexy guitar solo from Carlos Santana," wrote the Washington Post.

Over the decade, Porter performed live and recorded with Chinese erhu player Cheng Lin on the Embrace the World Vol. 1 album. He also produced Lin's album Greater than Gold, Algerian pop artist Khaled's "Love to the People" single featuring Carlos Santana, and Iraqi singer Kadim Al-Saher and Paula Cole on the single "Love and Compassion".

In February 2006, Porter welcomed Latin rock band, Ozomatli to his Calabasas, California, studio to record Don't Mess with the Dragon, their March 2007 release. The band and Porter had a history together that began when the producer invited them to guest on Santana's 2002 Shaman album. The following year, Porter co-wrote and produced "Love and Hope" and "(Who Discovered) America", for Ozomalti's Street Signs album.

With Don't Mess with the Dragon, "Ozomatli and Porter baked up an album that reflects the band's diverse ethnic makeup and 'oppositional politics' (how it characterizes its brand of activism). But even more fundamentally, the members of Ozomatli believe in the politics of dancing."

=== 2010–present: Solo artist ===
On August 2, 2013, Porter released his first solo album, Where the Soul is Born, on Insignia Records. The record, aka De Donde Nace El Alma has bilingual songs and features twelve tracks that are spiritually inspired in his belief in the oneness of humanity. Many of the songs were co-written with JB Eckl, Porter's song collaborator for Santana. "Canto", originally written and demoed by the duo for Santana is included on Where the Soul is Born with Porter's vocals.

"La Pared," the first single from Porter's next solo album, Cruzanderos, was released August 2, 2019, and features singer Allison Iraheta and rapper Olmeca on the "pop, tropical and reggaeton" song. The album of twelve songs, released November 1, 2019, thematically "tells the stories about people seeking freedom, or fleeing the violence of their countries, stories and struggles that, according to the musician, need to be told."

Other songs include a new version of "Canto", with Colombian marimba-inspired group Herencia de Timbiquí; "Quisiera", with Guatemalan singer Gaby Moreno; "El viajero"; "Pasaporte" (with Puerto Rican singer La India); "Virgen del sol" (with Argentine musician-composer Gustavo Santaolalla); "Mártires"; "Tanta locura"; "Será"; "24 horas"; and "Ruiseñor".

Porter is a former member of the Board of Governors of the National Academy of Recording Arts & Sciences (NARAS) and the Board of Trustees of the Latin Academy of Recording Arts & Sciences (LARAS).

== Films ==
In 2010, he composed music for the film, Faith in Common, which was selected at Dawn Breakers International Film Festival.

Porter created and produced a short documentary film on Bahaʼi painter Hooper Dunbar's art and faith called The Forces of Light and Darkness in 2016.

His other film contributions include voicing the role of Karl in the animated feature El Americano, and music productions for Mr. and Mrs. Smith, The Mexican, Hercules, Girlfight, Grosse Point Blank, Despicable Me 3, Get Him to the Greek, Cape of Good Hope, and the Spanish-version of The Flintstones.

== Activism, education ==
In 1999, Porter, along with Faith Holmes and Dennis Stafford, created Oneness, a non-profit organization with the mission of eliminating racism and promoting unity through music. Artists who have joined or contributed to the organization include Carlos Santana, B. B. King, Macy Gray Sarah McLachlan, Chaka Khan, Jimmy Jam, Ricky Martin, Brian McKnight, Angelique Kidjo, Luther Vandross and others. The money raised through its various projects goes to awareness and educational programs as well as scholarships and grants that promote positive race relations. These projects include the Songwriters' Summit, in which songwriters/artists created music of healing, unity and justice, and the Power of Oneness Awards, recognizing individuals for their commitment to fostering meaningful change in the area of race relations.
