= List of awards and nominations received by Ricky Martin =

Ricky Martin awards and nominations
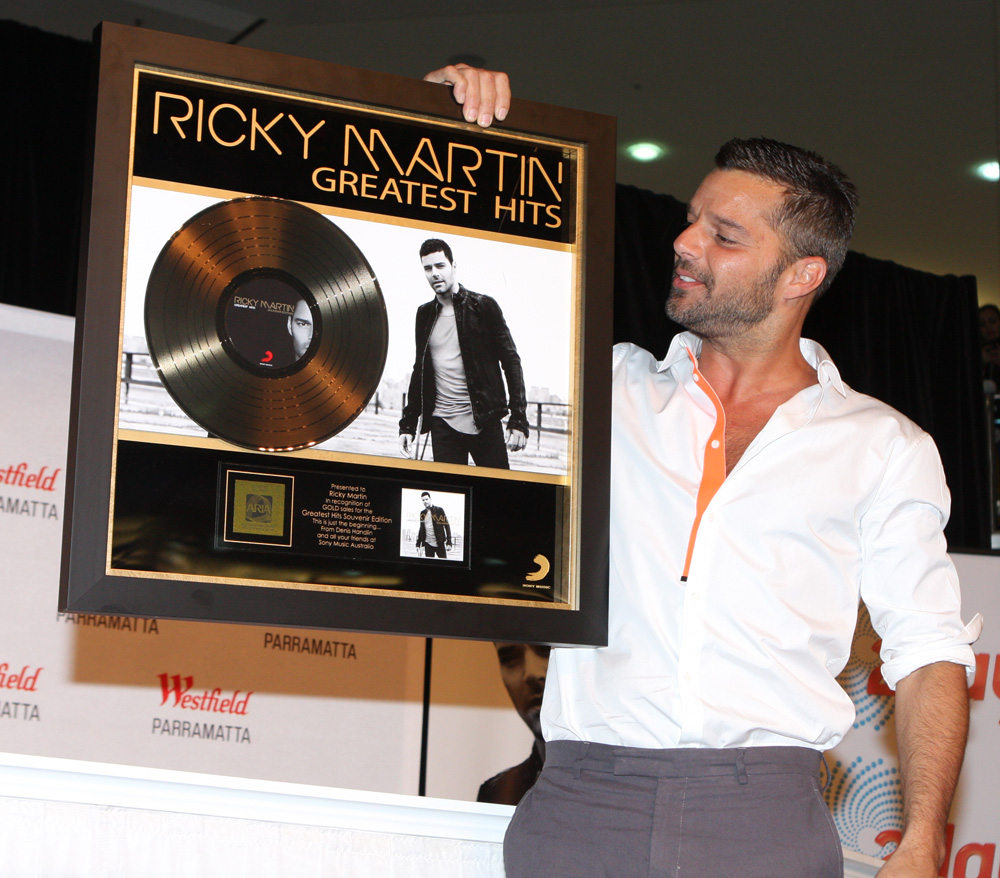
- Ricky Martin receiving a certification award in Australia (2013)
Awards and nominations
Award	Wins	Nominations
ALMA Award	6	9
American Music Awards	2	5
Billboard Music Awards	3	4
Billboard Latin Music Awards	9	25
Grammy Awards	2	8
International Dance Music Awards	2	6
Japan Gold Disc Awards	1	1
Latin Grammy Awards	4	24
Lo Nuestro Awards	14	53
MTV Europe Music Awards	1	5
MTV Video Music Awards	5	11
NRJ Music Awards	0	3
Premios Juventud	7	50
Primetime Emmy Awards	0	1
Satellite Awards	1	1
World Music Awards	7	7

Totals (Note: Certain award groups do not simply award one winner. They acknowledge several different recipients, have runners-up, and have third place. Since this is a specific recognition and is different from losing an award, runner-up mentions are considered wins in this award tally. For simplification and to avoid errors, each award in this list has been presumed to have had a prior nomination.)
- Wins: 235
- Nominations: 516

Puerto Rican recording artist and actor Ricky Martin is the recipient of multiple awards and nominations since his solo debut in the 1990s. Known as the "King of Latin Pop", he is the all-time best-selling Puerto Rican's artist, and one of the best-selling Latino singers.

A former member of juvenile band Menudo (1984–1989), Ricky Martin achieved his first awards and nominations as a soloist at the very beginning of his career; he won El Heraldo de México Awards for his acting in the telenovela, Alcanzar una estrella (1990) and the film Más Que Alcanzar una Estrella (1992). Upon the release of his debut album, Ricky Martin (1991) and the following record, Me Amaras (1992), he achieved nominations at the international level, including Lo Nuestro Awards and Billboard Music Awards. He consolidated his career in late 1990s, with the albums Vuelve (1998) and Ricky Martin (1999), and the singles "María" (1995), "The Cup of Life" (1998), and "Livin' la Vida Loca" (1999), for which he garnered other major awards and nominations, including Grammy Awards, BMI Latin Awards and Latin Billboard Music Awards.

Ricky's career was recognized in various ceremony awards, including an ALMA's Vanguard Award (2002), a Star Award at the Latin Billboard Music Awards (2003), and Lo Nuestro's Excellence Award (2004) and Maximum Excellence Award (2008). In 2025, he received the first Latin Icon from the MTV Video Music Awards. In addition, his success was particularly recognized by others special recognitions, including Premios Amigo's Latino Artist with the Greatest International Impact Award (1997), China Music Awards's Asian Most Influential International Artist Award (2014) and various Telehit Awards' Most Important Latin Artist Award.

Outside of his work in music, Ricky Martin garnered a number of awards and nominations for his acting career in Hollywood's cinema and theater, including a nomination at the Primetime Emmy Awards of 2018. He also received recognitions for his hispanidad and his prominence as a renowned Puerto Rican entertainer. His charitable endeavors were also recognized by various organizations, including amfAR and the World Summit of Nobel Peace Laureates.

== Awards and nominations ==
Award/organization (Note: Charts are not included, unless they are explicitly described as "awards" or specific trophies are given.)	Year	Nominee/work	Category	Result	Ref.
Academia de Médicos de Familia de Puerto Rico	2013	Ricky Martin	Communitary Award	Honoree	
Academia de la Música de España	2001	Ricky Martin	Latin Award of Honor	Honoree	
ALMA Awards	2000	Ricky Martin	Male Entertainer of the Year	Won	
ALMA Awards	2000	"Livin' la Vida Loca"	Outstanding Music Video	Won	
ALMA Awards	2001	Ricky Martin	Livin' la Vida Loca Tour	Won	
ALMA Awards	2002	Ricky Martin	National Council of La Raza Vanguard Award	Honoree	
ALMA Awards	2002	Ricky Martin	Outstanding Male Performer	Won	
ALMA Awards	2002	"Nobody Wants to Be Lonely" (with Christina Aguilera)	Outstanding Music Video	Won	
ALMA Awards	2002	Ricky Martin (2001 Blockbuster Entertainment Awards)	Performance in a Music, Variety or Comedy Special	Nominated	
ALMA Awards	2011	Ricky Martin	Favorite Male Music Artist	Nominated	
ALMA Awards	2012	Ricky Martin	Favorite Male Music Artist	Nominated	
amfAR	2010	Ricky Martin	Inspiration Award	Honoree	
American Music Awards	1999	Ricky Martin	Favorite Latin Artist	Nominated	
American Music Awards	2000	Ricky Martin	Favorite Latin Artist	Won	
American Music Awards	2000	Ricky Martin	Favorite Pop/Rock Male Artist	Nominated	
American Music Awards	2003	Ricky Martin	Favorite Latin Artist	Won	
American Music Awards	2015	Ricky Martin	Favorite Latin Artist	Nominated	
ARTISTdirect Online Music Awards	2000	Ricky Martin	Favorite Male Artist	Won	
ARTISTdirect Online Music Awards	2000	Ricky Martin	Sexiest Male	Nominated	
Astaire Awards	2012	Ricky Martin (Evita)	Outstanding Male Dancer in a Broadway Musical	Nominated	
Astra TV Awards	2024	Ricky Martin (Palm Royale)	Best Supporting Actor in a Streaming Comedy Series	Nominated	
Asociación Latina de Periodistas de Entretenimiento de Estados Unidos	2006	Ricky Martin	Brightest Star of the Year	Won	
Association of Latin Entertainment Critics (Latin ACE)	1993	Ricky Martin	Male Revelation Recording Artist	Won	
Association of Latin Entertainment Critics (Latin ACE)	1996	Ricky Martin	Outstanding Male Artist	Won	
Association of Latin Entertainment Critics (Latin ACE)	1997	Ricky Martin	Outstanding Male Artist	Won	
Association of Latin Entertainment Critics (Latin ACE)	1997	Ricky Martin (Radio City)	Best Show	Won	
Association of Latin Entertainment Critics (Latin ACE)	1997	"María"	Song of the Year	Nominated	
Association of Latin Entertainment Critics (Latin ACE)	1997	A Medio Vivir	Album of the Year — Male	Nominated	
Association of Latin Entertainment Critics (Latin ACE)	1999	Ricky Martin	Male Singer of the Year	Won	
Association of Latin Entertainment Critics (Latin ACE)	1999	"Livin' la Vida Loca"	Record of the Year — Male	Won	
Association of Latin Entertainment Critics (Latin ACE)	1999	Vuelve	Album of the Year — Male	Nominated	
Association of Latin Entertainment Critics (Latin ACE)	2000	Ricky Martin	Male Singer of the Year	Won	
Association of Latin Entertainment Critics (Latin ACE)	2000	"Livin' la Vida Loca"	Record of the Year — Male	Won	
Attitude	2018	Ricky Martin	Attitude Legend Award	Honoree	
BDSCertified Spin Awards	2003	"She's All I Ever Had"	200,000 Spins	Won	
BDSCertified Spin Awards	2005	"Tal Vez"	50,000 Spins	Won	
Billboard Latin Music Awards	1999	Ricky Martin	Hot Latin Tracks Artist of the Year	Nominated	
Billboard Latin Music Awards	1999	"La Copa de la Vida"	Latin Dance Maxi-Single of the Year	Nominated	
Billboard Latin Music Awards	1999	Vuelve	Pop Album of the Year, Male	Won	
Billboard Latin Music Awards	1999	"Vuelve"	Latin Pop Track of the Year	Won	
Billboard Latin Music Awards	1999	"Vuelve"	Hot Latin Track of the Year	Nominated	
Billboard Latin Music Awards	2000	"Livin' la Vida Loca"	Hot Latin Track of the Year	Nominated	
Billboard Latin Music Awards	2000	"Livin' la Vida Loca"	Latin Pop Track of the Year	Won	
Billboard Latin Music Awards	2000	"Bella"	Latin Pop Track of the Year	Nominated	
Billboard Latin Music Awards	2000	Ricky Martin	Billboard Latin 50 Artist of the year	Nominated	
Billboard Latin Music Awards	2000	Ricky Martin	Hot Latin Tracks Artist of the Year	Nominated	
Billboard Latin Music Awards	2001	"Shake Your Bon-Bon"	Latin Dance Maxi-Single of the Year	Nominated	
Billboard Latin Music Awards	2002	La Historia	Latin Greatest Hits Album of the Year	Nominated	
Billboard Latin Music Awards	2002	"Loaded"	Latin Dance Maxi-Single of the Year	Nominated	
Billboard Latin Music Awards	2002	Ricky Martin	Spirit of Hope Award	Honoree	
Billboard Latin Music Awards	2003	Ricky Martin	Latin Billboard Star Award	Honoree	
Billboard Latin Music Awards	2004	"Tal Vez"	Hot Latin Song of the Year	Won	
Billboard Latin Music Awards	2004	"Tal Vez"	Latin Pop Airplay Track of the Year, Male	Won	
Billboard Latin Music Awards	2004	Almas del Silencio	Latin Pop Album of the Year, Male	Won	
Billboard Latin Music Awards	2004	"Jaleo"	Latin Dance Club Play Track of the Year	Nominated	
Billboard Latin Music Awards	2004	Ricky Martin	Hot Latin Tracks Artist Of The Year	Nominated	
Billboard Latin Music Awards	2006	"I Don't Care/Qué Mas Da" (Dance Remixes)	Latin Dance Club Play Track of the Year	Won	
Billboard Latin Music Awards	2007	"Tu Recuerdo" (featuring La Mari and Tommy Torres)	Hot Latin Songs of the Year, Vocal Duet or Collaboration	Nominated	
Billboard Latin Music Awards	2007	"Tu Recuerdo" (featuring La Mari and Tommy Torres)	Latin Pop Airplay Song of the Year, Duo or Group	Nominated	
Billboard Latin Music Awards	2007	MTV Unplugged	Latin Pop Album of the Year, Male	Nominated	
Billboard Latin Music Awards	2008	Ricky Martin	Latin Tour of the Year	Nominated	
Billboard Music Awards	1993	Ricky Martin	Best New Latin Artist	Won	
Billboard Music Awards	1999	Ricky Martin	Male Artist of the Year	Won	
Billboard Music Awards	1999	Ricky Martin	Hot 100 Singles Artist of the Year — Male	Won	
Billboard Music Awards	2022	Enrique Iglesias and Ricky Martin Live in Concert	Top Latin Tour	Nominated	
Billboard Music Video Awards	1993	"Me Amaras"	New Artist Clip of the Year — Latin	Won	
Billboard Music Video Awards	1999	"Livin' la Vida Loca"	Maximum Vision Award	Nominated	
Billboard Music Video Awards	1999	"Livin' la Vida Loca"	Best New Artist Clip — Dance	Nominated	
Billboard Music Video Awards	1999	"She's All I Ever Had"	Best New Artist Clip — Jazz/AC	Nominated	
Billboard Music Video Awards	2001	"She Bangs"	Best Clip of the Year — Latin	Won	
Blockbuster Entertainment Awards	1999	Ricky Martin	Favorite Latin Artist	Won	
Blockbuster Entertainment Awards	2000	Ricky Martin	Favorite Pop Male Artist	Won	
Blockbuster Entertainment Awards	2000	Ricky Martin	Favorite CD	Nominated	
Blockbuster Entertainment Awards	2001	Ricky Martin	Favorite Male Artist of the Year	Nominated	
Blockbuster Entertainment Awards	2001	Ricky Martin	Favorite Artist — Latino (Internet Only)	Nominated	
Blockbuster Entertainment Awards	2001	Ricky Martin	Favorite Male Artist — Pop (Internet Only)	Won	
BMI Latin Awards	1997	"María"	Winning-Songs	Won	
BMI Latin Awards	1999	"La Copa de la Vida"	Winning-Songs	Won	
BMI Latin Awards	2000	"Perdido Sin Ti"	Winning-Songs	Won	
BMI Latin Awards	2000	"The Cup of Life"	Winning-Songs	Won	
BMI Latin Awards	2000	"The Cup of Life"	Song of the Year	Won	
BMI Latin Awards	2001	"Bella"	Winning-Songs	Won	
BMI Latin Awards	2005	"Jaleo"	Songs List	Won	
BMI Latin Awards	2005	"Y Todo Queda en Nada"	Songs List	Won	
BMI Latin Awards	2008	"Pégate"	Award-Winning Song	Won	
BMI Latin Awards	2012	"Lo Mejor de Mi Vida Eres Tú" (featuring Natalia Jiménez)	Award-Winning Song	Won	
BMI Latin Awards	2016	"Adrenalina" (Wisin featuring Ricky Martin and Jennifer Lopez)	Award-Winning Song	Won	
BMI Latin Awards	2017	"La Mordidita" (featuring Yotuel)	Award-Winning Song	Won	
BMI Latin Awards	2017	"Que Se Sienta El Deseo" (Wisin feat Ricky Martin)	Award-Winning Song	Won	
BMI Latin Awards	2018	"Vente Pa' Ca" (featuring Maluma)	Award-Winning Song	Won	
BMI Latin Awards	2018	"Que Se Sienta El Deseo" (Wisin feat Ricky Martin)	Award-Winning Song	Won	
BMI Pop Awards	2001	"She's All I Ever Had"	Winning-Songs	Won	
BMI Pop Awards	2002	"She Bangs"	Winning-Songs	Won	
Bonita Springs Gala	2006	Ricky Martin	Humanitarian Award	Honoree	
Broadway.com	2012	Ricky Martin	Sexiest Man Alive	Won	
Brit Awards	2000	Ricky Martin	Best International Male	Nominated	
Brit Awards	2001	Ricky Martin	Best International Male	Nominated	
British LGBT Awards	2018	Ricky Martin	International Icon Award	Honoree	
Cadena 100	2015	Ricky Martin	Los Premios Número 1	Won	
Cadena Dial	2011	Ricky Martin	Dial Award	Won	
China Music Awards	2014	Ricky Martin	Asian Most Influential International Artist	Honoree	
Congressional Hispanic Caucus Institute	2003	Ricky Martin	Chair's Humanitarian Award	Honoree	
Desi Entertainment Awards	1995	Ricky Martin (General Hospital)	Best Supporting Actor	Won	
Drama Desk Award	2012	Ricky Martin (Evita)	Outstanding Actor in a Musical	Nominated	
Drama League Award	2012	Ricky Martin (Evita)	Distinguished Performance Award	Won	
E! Entertainment Awards	1999	Ricky Martin	Most Outstanding Hispanic American Artist International — Music	Honoree	
E! Golden Hanger Awards	1999	Ricky Martin	Male Trendsetter of the Year	Won	
Entertainment Weekly	1999	Ricky Martin	Entertainer of the Year	Won	
ECHO Award	2000	Ricky Martin	International Male Artist	Won	
El Heraldo de México Awards	1991	Ricky Martin (Alcanzar una estrella II)	Best Revelation Actor	Won	
El Heraldo de México Awards	1993	Ricky Martin (Más Que Alcanzar una Estrella)	Best Actor	Won	
El Heraldo de México Awards	1994	Ricky Martin	Best Singer	Won	
Fan Choice Awards (Mexico)	2021	Ricky Martin	Best Featuring Video - Male Artist	Nominated	
Fan Choice Awards (Mexico)	2021	Ricky Martin	Latin Pop	Nominated	
Fan Choice Awards (Mexico)	2021	Ricky Martin	Male Pop Artist	Nominated	
Fan Choice Awards (Mexico)	2023	Ricky Martin & Reik	Pop Collaboration	Nominated	
Festival Internacional de la Orquídea	1992	Ricky Martin	Orquidea de Plata (Silver Orchid)	Silver	
Foundation for Social Change	2011	Ricky Martin	Leader of Change Award	Honoree	
FMDOS Awards	2021	Pausa	Album of the Year	Nominated	
Galardón a los Grandes	1992	Ricky Martin	1992 winners	Won	
GLAAD Media Award	2011	Ricky Martin	Vito Russo Award	Honoree	
GLAAD Media Award	2012	Ricky Martin (Música + Alma + Sexo)	Outstanding Spanish-Language Music Artist	Won	
GLAAD Media Award	2016	Ricky Martin	Outstanding Spanish-Language Music Artist	Won	
GLAAD Media Award	2021	Ricky Martin	Outstanding Music Artist	Nominated	
Global Gift Foundation Awards	2013	Ricky Martin	Humanitarian Award	Honoree	
Globo Awards (New York) (Note: transl. Globe Awards)	1999	Ricky Martin	Pop/Ballad Artist of the Year	Won	
Globo Awards (New York)	1999	"Livin' la Vida Loca"	Pop/Ballad Song of the Year	Won	
Globo Awards (New York)	1999	Ricky Martin	Pop/Ballad Album of the Year	Won	
Goldene Kamera	2001	Ricky Martin	Pop International Award	Won	
Grammy Awards	1999	Vuelve	Best Latin Pop Performance	Won	
Grammy Awards	2000	Ricky Martin	Best Pop Album	Nominated	
Grammy Awards	2000	"Livin' la Vida Loca"	Record of the Year	Nominated	
Grammy Awards	2000	"Livin' la Vida Loca"	Best Male Pop Vocal Performance	Nominated	
Grammy Awards	2001	"She Bangs"	Best Male Pop Vocal Performance	Nominated	
Grammy Awards	2002	"Nobody Wants to Be Lonely" (with Christina Aguilera)	Best Pop Collaboration With Vocals	Nominated	
Grammy Awards	2016	A Quien Quiera Escuchar	Best Latin Pop Album	Won	
Grammy Awards	2021	Pausa	Best Latin Pop or Urban Album	Nominated	
Heat Latin Music Awards	2015	"Adrenalina" (Wisin featuring Ricky Martin and Jennifer Lopez)	Best Music Video	Nominated	
Heat Latin Music Awards	2015	Ricky Martin	Best Male Artist	Nominated	
Heat Latin Music Awards	2015	Ricky Martin	Best Rock/Pop Artist	Nominated	
Heat Latin Music Awards	2015	Ricky Martin	Best Artist North	Nominated	
Heat Latin Music Awards	2016	Ricky Martin	Best Male Artist	Nominated	
Heat Latin Music Awards	2016	Ricky Martin	Best Rock/Pop Artist	Nominated	
Heat Latin Music Awards	2016	Ricky Martin	Best Artist North	Nominated	
Hispanic Federation	2018	Ricky Martin	HF Humanitarian Award	Honoree	
Hispanic Heritage Foundation	2002	Ricky Martin	HHA Art Award	Honoree	
¡Hola! USA	2017	Ricky Martin	Humanitarian of the Year	Honoree	
Hong Kong Top Sales Music Awards	2001	Sound Loaded	Top 10 Best Selling Foreign Albums	Won	
Human Rights Campaign's National Dinner	2019	Ricky Martin	National Visibility Award	Honoree	
International Dance Music Awards	2000	"Livin La Vida Loca"	Best Latin 12"	Won	
International Dance Music Awards	2001	"She Bangs"	Best Latin 12"	Won	
International Dance Music Awards	2012	"Frío" (featuring Wisin & Yandel)	Best Latin/Reggaeton Track	Nominated	
International Dance Music Awards	2014	"Come with Me"	Best Latin Dance Track	Nominated	
International Dance Music Awards	2015	"Adiós"	Best Latin Dance Track	Nominated	
International Dance Music Awards	2016	"La Mordidita" (featuring Yotuel)	Best Latin Dance Track	Nominated	
International Centre for Missing & Exploited Children	2005	Ricky Martin	International Award	Honoree	
iHeartRadio Fiesta Latina	2017	Ricky Martin	Corazon Latino Award	Honoree	
Imagen Awards	2000	Ricky Martin	Lasting Image Award	Honoree	
Imagen Awards	2000	"She's All I Ever Had"	Video of the Year	Won	
Japan Gold Disc Awards	2000	Ricky Martin	International Pop Album of the Year	Won	
Juno Awards	2000	Ricky Martin	Best Selling Album (Foreign or Domestic)	Nominated	
Kids' Choice Awards	2000	Ricky Martin	Favorite Male Singer	Nominated	
Kids' Choice Awards	2001	Ricky Martin	Favorite Male Singer	Nominated	
Latin American Music Awards	2015	Ricky Martin	Favorite Pop/Rock Male Artist	Nominated	
Latin American Music Awards	2015	A Quien Quiera Escuchar	Album of the Year	Won	
Latin American Music Awards	2015	"La Mordidita" (featuring Yotuel)	Favorite Pop/Rock Song	Won	
Latin American Music Awards	2017	"Vente Pa' Ca" (featuring Maluma)	Favorite Pop/Rock Song	Nominated	
Latin American Music Awards	2021	Ricky Martin	Favorite Artist — Pop	Nominated	
Latin American Music Awards	2021	"Tiburones"	Favorite Song — Pop	Nominated	
Latin American Music Awards	2022	Enrique Iglesias and Ricky Martin Live in Concert	Tour of the Year	Won	
Latin American Music Awards	2022	Ricky Martin	Favorite Social Artist	Nominated	
Latin American Music Awards	2023	Ricky Martin	Best Artist – Pop	Nominated	
Latin Grammy Awards	2000	"Livin' La Vida Loca"	Record of the Year	Nominated	
Latin Grammy Awards	2000	"Bella"	Male Pop Vocal Performance	Nominated	
Latin Grammy Awards	2001	"She Bangs"	Best Music Video	Won	
Latin Grammy Awards	2004	Almas del Silencio	Best Male Pop Vocal Album	Nominated	
Latin Grammy Awards	2007	MTV Unplugged	Best Long Form Music Video	Won	
Latin Grammy Awards	2007	MTV Unplugged	Best Male Pop Vocal Album	Won	
Latin Grammy Awards	2007	MTV Unplugged	Album of the Year	Nominated	
Latin Grammy Awards	2007	"Tu Recuerdo" (featuring La Mari and Tommy Torres)	Record Of The Year	Nominated	
Latin Grammy Awards	2011	"Lo Mejor De Mi Vida Eres Tu" (featuring Natalia Jiménez)	Best Short Form Music Video	Nominated	
Latin Grammy Awards	2011	"Lo Mejor De Mi Vida Eres Tu" (featuring Natalia Jiménez)	Record Of The Year	Nominated	
Latin Grammy Awards	2011	"Lo Mejor De Mi Vida Eres Tu" (featuring Natalia Jiménez)	Song of the Year	Nominated	
Latin Grammy Awards	2013	"Más y Más" (Draco Rosa featuring Ricky Martin)	Record of the Year	Nominated	
Latin Grammy Awards	2015	"Disparo al Corazón"	Record of the Year	Nominated	
Latin Grammy Awards	2015	"Disparo al Corazón"	Song of the Year	Nominated	
Latin Grammy Awards	2015	A Quien Quiera Escuchar	Best Contemporary Pop Vocal Album	Nominated	
Latin Grammy Awards	2017	"Vente Pa' Ca" (featuring Maluma)	Record of the Year	Nominated	
Latin Grammy Awards	2017	"Vente Pa' Ca" (featuring Maluma)	Song of the Year	Nominated	
Latin Grammy Awards	2020	"Pausa"	Album of the Year	Nominated	
Latin Grammy Awards	2020	"Pausa"	Best Pop Vocal Album	Won	
Latin Grammy Awards	2020	"Cántalo" (with Residente and Bad Bunny)	Best Urban Fusion/Performance	Nominated	
Latin Grammy Awards	2021	"Canción Bonita" (with Carlos Vives)	Best Pop Song	Nominated	
Latin Grammy Awards	2021	"Canción Bonita" (with Carlos Vives)	Song of the Year	Nominated	
Latin Grammy Awards	2022	"A Veces Bien y a Veces Mal" (with Reik)	Song of the Year	Nominated	
Latin Grammy Awards	2023	Play	Album of the Year	Nominated	
Latin Recording Academy	2006	Ricky Martin	Person of the Year	Honoree	
Latino Show Music Awards (Colombia)	2020	"Falta Amor" (with Sebastián Yatra)	Best Pop song	Nominated	
Latino Show Music Awards (Colombia)	2021	Ricky Martin	Best Pop Male Artist	Nominated	
LGBTQ Nation Heroes	2020	Ricky Martin	Celebrity Activist of the Year	Won	
Los Angeles LGBT Center Dinner	2018	Ricky Martin	Trailblazer Award	Honoree	
Lo Nuestro Awards	1992	Ricky Martin	Pop New Artist of the Year	Nominated	
Lo Nuestro Awards	1996	"Te Extraño, Te Olvido, Te Amo"	Video of the Year	Won	
Lo Nuestro Awards	1998	Vuelve	Pop Album of the Year	Nominated	
Lo Nuestro Awards	1999	Ricky Martin	Pop Male Artist of the Year	Won	
Lo Nuestro Awards	1999	"Vuelve"	Pop Song of the Year	Nominated	
Lo Nuestro Awards	1999	"La Copa de la Vida"	Pop Song of the Year	Won	
Lo Nuestro Awards	2000	Ricky Martin	Male Pop Artist of the Year	Won	
Lo Nuestro Awards	2000	Ricky Martin	Pop Album of the Year	Nominated	
Lo Nuestro Awards	2000	"Livin' la Vida Loca" (Spanish Version)	Pop Song of the Year	Won	
Lo Nuestro Awards	2000	"Bella"	Video of the Year	Won	
Lo Nuestro Awards	2001	"She Bangs" (Spanish Version)	Video of the Year	Won	
Lo Nuestro Awards	2004	Almas del Silencio	Pop Album of the Year	Nominated	
Lo Nuestro Awards	2004	"Tal Vez"	Pop Song of the Year	Nominated	
Lo Nuestro Awards	2004	"Jaleo"	Video of the Year	Nominated	
Lo Nuestro Awards	2004	Ricky Martin	Best Pop Male Artist	Nominated	
Lo Nuestro Awards	2004	Ricky Martin	Excellence Award	Honoree	
Lo Nuestro Awards	2005	Ricky Martin	Pop Male Artist	Nominated	
Lo Nuestro Awards	2005	"Y Todo Queda en Nada"	Pop Song of the Year	Nominated	
Lo Nuestro Awards	2008	MTV Unplugged	Pop Album of the Year	Won	
Lo Nuestro Awards	2008	Ricky Martin	Maximum Excellence Award	Honoree	
Lo Nuestro Awards	2008	Ricky Martin	Pop Male Artist	Nominated	
Lo Nuestro Awards	2008	"Tu Recuerdo" (featuring La Mari and Tommy Torres)	Pop Song of the Year	Nominated	
Lo Nuestro Awards	2011	Ricky Martin	World Icon Award	Honoree	
Lo Nuestro Awards	2012	Música + Alma + Sexo	Pop Album of the Year	Nominated	
Lo Nuestro Awards	2012	Ricky Martin	Best Pop Male Artist	Nominated	
Lo Nuestro Awards	2012	"Lo Mejor de Mi Vida Eres Tú" (featuring Natalia Jiménez)	Pop Song of the Year	Nominated	
Lo Nuestro Awards	2012	"Lo Mejor de Mi Vida Eres Tú" (featuring Natalia Jiménez)	Collaboration of the Year	Nominated	
Lo Nuestro Awards	2014	"Come with Me"	Video of the Year	Nominated	
Lo Nuestro Awards	2015	Ricky Martin	Pop Male Artist of the Year	Nominated	
Lo Nuestro Awards	2015	"Adrenalina" (Wisin featuring Ricky Martin and Jennifer Lopez)	Urban Song of the Year	Nominated	
Lo Nuestro Awards	2015	"Adrenalina" (Wisin featuring Ricky Martin and Jennifer Lopez)	Collaboration of the Year	Nominated	
Lo Nuestro Awards	2015	"Adrenalina" (Wisin featuring Ricky Martin and Jennifer Lopez)	Video of the Year	Nominated	
Lo Nuestro Awards	2016	A Quien Quiera Escuchar	Pop/Rock Album of the Year	Won	
Lo Nuestro Awards	2016	Ricky Martin	Pop/Rock Male Artist of the Year	Nominated	
Lo Nuestro Awards	2016	"Disparo al Corazón"	Pop/Rock Song of the Year	Won	
Lo Nuestro Awards	2016	"La Mordidita" (featuring Yotuel)	Video of the Year	Won	
Lo Nuestro Awards	2017	Ricky Martin	Pop/Rock Male Artist of the Year	Nominated	
Lo Nuestro Awards	2019	Ricky Martin	Pop/Rock Artist of the Year	Nominated	
Lo Nuestro Awards	2019	"Fiebre" (with Wisin & Yandel)	Pop/Rock Song of the Year	Nominated	
Lo Nuestro Awards	2019	"Fiebre" (with Wisin & Yandel)	Pop/Rock Collaboration of the Year	Nominated	
Lo Nuestro Awards	2021	Ricky Martin	Pop Artist of the Year	Nominated	
Lo Nuestro Awards	2021	"Tiburones"	Pop Song of the Year	Nominated	
Lo Nuestro Awards	2021	Pausa	Pop Album of the Year	Nominated	
Lo Nuestro Awards	2022	Ricky Martin	Pop Artist of the Year	Nominated	
Lo Nuestro Awards	2022	"Canción Bonita" (with Carlos Vives)	The Perfect Mix Of The Year	Nominated	
Lo Nuestro Awards	2022	"Canción Bonita" (with Carlos Vives)	Tropical Collaboration of the Year	Nominated	
Lo Nuestro Awards	2023	Ricky Martin	Pop Male Artist of the Year	Nominated	
Lo Nuestro Awards	2023	"A Veces Bien y a Veces Mal" (with Reik)	Pop Collaboration of the Year	Nominated	
Lo Nuestro Awards	2023	"A Veces Bien y a Veces Mal" (with Reik)	Pop/Ballad Song of the Year	Nominated	
Lo Nuestro Awards	2023	Play	Pop Album of the Year	Nominated	
Lo Nuestro Awards	2024	Ricky Martin	Pop Male Artist of the Year	Nominated	
Lo Nuestro Awards	2025	"Fuego de Noche, Nieve de Día" (with Christian Nodal)	The Perfect Mix of the Year	Nominated	
Lo Nuestro Awards	2025	"Fuego de Noche, Nieve de Día" (with Christian Nodal)	Pop/Ballad Song of the Year	Nominated	
LOS40 Music Awards	2008	Ricky Martin	Best International Artist or Group in the Spanish Language	Nominated	
LOS40 Music Awards	2008	"No Estamos Solo" (Eros Ramazzotti featuring Ricky Martin)	Best International Song in the Spanish Language	Nominated	
LOS40 Music Awards	2011	Ricky Martin	Best International Artist in the Spanish Language	Nominated	
LOS40 Music Awards	2013	Ricky Martin	Best Latin Artist or Group	Won	
LOS40 Music Awards	2014	Ricky Martin	Best Latin Artist or Group	Nominated	
LOS40 Music Awards	2014	"Adrenalina" (Wisin featuring Ricky Martin and Jennifer Lopez)	Best Spanish Language Song	Nominated	
Lunas del Auditorio	2006	Ricky Martin	Best Spanish Pop	Nominated	
Lunas del Auditorio	2007	Ricky Martin	Best Spanish Pop	Nominated	
Lunas del Auditorio	2008	Ricky Martin	Best Spanish Pop	Nominated	
Lunas del Auditorio	2011	Ricky Martin	Best Spanish Pop	Nominated	
Lunas del Auditorio	2012	Ricky Martin	Best Spanish Pop	Nominated	
Lunas del Auditorio	2015	Ricky Martin	Best Spanish Pop	Won	
Lunas del Auditorio	2018	Ricky Martin	Best Spanish Pop	Nominated	
Mi TRL Awards	2007	Ricky Martin	Male of the year	Nominated	
Mi TRL Awards	2007	"Tu Recuerdo" (featuring La Mari and Tommy Torres)	Mi TRL Pepsi Viewers Choice Awards	Nominated	
Miami Life Awards	2007	Ricky Martin	International Male Artist	Nominated	
Miami Life Awards	2007	One Night Only with Ricky Martin	Concert of the Year	Nominated	
Mnet Asian Music Awards	1999	Ricky Martin	Best International Artist	Won	
MTV Asia Awards	2002	Ricky Martin	Favorite Male Artist	Won	
MTV Asia Awards	2004	Ricky Martin	Favorite Male Artist	Nominated	
MTV Asia Awards	2006	Ricky Martin	Favorite Male Artist	Won	
MTV Asia China Awards	1999	Ricky Martin	International Breakthrough Artist	Won	
MTV Europe Music Awards	1998	Ricky Martin	Best Male Artist	Nominated	
MTV Europe Music Awards	1999	Ricky Martin	Best Male Artist	Nominated	
MTV Europe Music Awards	1999	Ricky Martin	Best Pop Artist	Nominated	
MTV Europe Music Awards	2000	Ricky Martin	Best Male Artist	Won	
MTV Europe Music Awards	2001	Ricky Martin	Best Male Artist	Nominated	
MTV Video Music Awards	1999	"Livin' la Vida Loca"	Best Pop Video	Won	
MTV Video Music Awards	1999	"Livin' la Vida Loca"	Best Dance Video	Won	
MTV Video Music Awards	1999	"Livin' la Vida Loca"	Best Male Video	Nominated	
MTV Video Music Awards	1999	"Livin' la Vida Loca"	Video of the Year	Nominated	
MTV Video Music Awards	1999	"Livin' la Vida Loca"	Best Choreography	Nominated	
MTV Video Music Awards	1999	"Livin' la Vida Loca"	Viewer's Choice	Nominated	
MTV Video Music Awards	1999	"Livin' la Vida Loca"	International Viewer's Choice — Latin America (North)	Won	
MTV Video Music Awards	1999	"Livin' la Vida Loca"	International Viewer's Choice — Latin America (South)	Won	
MTV Video Music Awards	1999	"Livin' la Vida Loca"	International Viewer's Choice — Russia	Won	
MTV Video Music Awards	2000	"Shake Your Bon-Bon"	Best Male Video	Nominated	
MTV Video Music Awards	2000	"Shake Your Bon-Bon"	Best Dance video	Nominated	
MTV Video Music Awards	2025	Ricky Martin	Latin Icon Award	Honoree	
MTV Video Music Awards Latin America	2003	Ricky Martin	Best Pop Artist	Nominated	
MTV Video Music Awards Latin America	2003	Ricky Martin	Best Solo Artist	Nominated	
MTV Video Music Awards Latin America	2006	Ricky Martin	Best MTV Tr3́s Artist	Nominated	
MTV Video Music Awards Latin America	2007	"Tu Recuerdo" (featuring La Mari and Tommy Torres)	Song of the Year	Nominated	
MTV Millennial Awards	2017	"Vente Pa' Ca" (featuring Maluma)	Best Party Anthem	Nominated	
Musa Awards	2021	"Qué Rico Fuera" (with Paloma Mami)	International Collaboration of the Year — Spanish	Nominated	
MVPA Awards	2000	"Livin' la Vida Loca"	Best Choreography	Won	
MVPA Awards	2000	"Livin' la Vida Loca"	Best Styling	Won	
My VH1 Music Awards	2000	Ricky Martin	Man of the Year	Nominated	
My VH1 Music Awards	2000	Ricky Martin	Best Stage Spectacle	Nominated	
My VH1 Music Awards	2000	Ricky Martin	Booty Shake	Won	
NAACP Image Awards	2021	Jingle Jangle: A Christmas Journey	Outstanding Ensemble Cast in a Motion Picture	Nominated	
NAACP Image Awards	2021	Jingle Jangle: A Christmas Journey	Outstanding Soundtrack/Compilation Album	Nominated	
National Museum of Puerto Rican Arts and Culture	2023	Ricky Martin	Ceiba National Award	Honoree	
NRJ Music Awards	2006	Ricky Martin	International Male Artist of the Year	Nominated	
NRJ Music Awards	2007	Ricky Martin	International Male Artist of the Year	Nominated	
NRJ Radio Awards (Nordic)	2001	Ricky Martin	International Male Singer	Nominated	
Orgullosamente Latino Awards	2004	Ricky Martin	Male Solo Artist of the Year	Nominated	
Orgullosamente Latino Awards	2007	Ricky Martin	Male Solo Artist of the Year	Nominated	
Orgullosamente Latino Awards	2008	Ricky Martin	Latin Trajectory of the Year	Nominated	
Orgullosamente Latino Awards	2009	Ricky Martin	Latin Trajectory of the Year	Nominated	
Orgullosamente Latino Awards	2010	Ricky Martin	Latin Trajectory of the Year	Nominated	
PeaceTech Lab	2021	Ricky Martin	International Peace Honors Award	Honoree	
People en Español Awards	2000	Ricky Martin	Sexiest Man Alive	Won	
People en Español Awards	2001	Ricky Martin	Sexiest Man Alive	2nd place	
People en Español Awards	2010	Ricky Martin	Star of the Year	Won	
People en Español Awards	2010	Ricky Martin	Best Dressed, Male	Nominated	
People en Español Awards	2011	Ricky Martin	Comeback of the Year	Won	
People en Español Awards	2011	Ricky Martin	Worst Dressed	Nominated	
People en Español Awards	2011	Música + Alma + Sexo	Best Album	Nominated	
People en Español Awards	2011	"Frío" (featuring Wisin & Yandel)	Best Video of the Year	Nominated	
People en Español Awards	2012	Ricky Martin	Best Male Singer	Won	
People en Español Awards	2012	Ricky Martin	King of Twitter	Nominated	
People en Español Awards	2012	Ricky Martin	King of Facebook	Nominated	
People en Español Awards	2013	"Más y Más" (Draco Rosa featuring Ricky Martin)	Best Video of the Year	Nominated	
People en Español Awards	2013	"Más y Más" (Draco Rosa featuring Ricky Martin)	Best Collaboration of the Year	Nominated	
People's Choice Awards	2000	Ricky Martin	Favorite Male Musical Performer	Won	
People's Choice Awards	2001	Ricky Martin	Favorite Male Musical Performer	Nominated	
Poder Magazine	2013	Ricky Martin	Poder Business Award	Honoree	
Pop Corn Music Awards	1999	Ricky Martin	Best Male Artist, International	Won	
Pop Corn Music Awards	1999	Ricky Martin	Best Album, International	Won	
Pop Corn Music Awards	2000	Ricky Martin	Best Male Artist, International	Won	
Pop Corn Music Awards	2000	Ricky Martin	Best Dance Act, International	Won	
Pollstar Awards	2021	Ricky Martin	Latin Touring Artist of the Decade	Nominated	
Pollstar Awards	2022	Enrique Iglesias and Ricky Martin Live in Concert	Best Latin Tour	Won	
Pollstar Awards	2024	The Trilogy Tour	Latin Tour of the Year	Nominated	
Premios Amigo	1997	Ricky Martin	Latino Artist with the Greatest International Impact	Honoree	
Premios Amigo	1997	Ricky Martin	Best Latin Male Artist	Nominated	
Premios Amigo	1997	A Medio Vivir	Best Latin Album	Nominated	
Premios Amigo	1999	Ricky Martin	Best International Male Solo Artist	Won	
Premios Disco México	1993	Ricky Martin	Best National Campaign (Ad)	Won	
Premios Eres (Mexico)	1990	Mamá Ama el Rock	Best Supporting Actor in Theatre	Won	
Premios Eres (Mexico)	1992	Ricky Martin (Ricky Martin)	Best Latin Singer	Won	
Premios Eres (Mexico)	1996	Ricky Martin	Best Latin Singer	Won	
Premios Eres (Mexico)	1997	Ricky Martin	Best Latin Singer	Won	
Premios Eres (Mexico)	1997	Ricky Martin	Best Show	Won	
Premios Eres (Mexico)	1997	"Fuego de Noche, Nieve de Día"	Best Video	Won	
Premios Eres (Mexico)	1998	Ricky Martin	Best Imagen	Won	
Premios Eres (Mexico)	1998	Ricky Martin	Best Latin Singer	Won	
Premios Eres (Mexico)	1998	Ricky Martin	Trayectory Award	Honoree	
Premios Eres (Mexico)	1999	Ricky Martin	Best Latin Singer	Won	
Premios Eres (Mexico)	1999	"La Bomba"	Danceable Track	Won	
Premios Eres (Mexico)	2000	Ricky Martin	Best Image — Male	Won	
Premios Eres (Mexico)	2000	Ricky Martin	Best Concert	Won	
Premios Eres (Mexico)	2000	Ricky Martin	Best Record - Male	Won	
Premios Eres (Mexico)	2000	"Livin' la Vida Loca"	Best Song	Won	
Premios Eres (Mexico)	2001	Ricky Martin	Best Male Artist	Won	
Premios Eres (Mexico)	2001	Ricky Martin	Sexiest Artist	Nominated	
Premios Gardel	2000	Ricky Martin	Best Latin Singer — Male	Nominated	
Premios Gardel	2000	Ricky Martin	Best Pop Album	Nominated	
Premios Gardel	2001	Sound Loaded	Best Latin Album, Male	Nominated	
Premios Juventud	2004	Ricky Martin	He's Got Style	Nominated	
Premios Juventud	2004	Ricky Martin	He's So Hot!	Nominated	
Premios Juventud	2004	Ricky Martin	Best Moves	Nominated	
Premios Juventud	2004	Ricky Martin	All Over the Dial	Nominated	
Premios Juventud	2004	Ricky Martin	Paparazzi's Favorite Target	Nominated	
Premios Juventud	2004	"Livin' la Vida Loca"	Best Re-Mix	Nominated	
Premios Juventud	2004	"La Bomba"	Party Starter	Nominated	
Premios Juventud	2004	Almas del silencio	CD To Die For	Nominated	
Premios Juventud	2004	Ricky Martin & Christina Aguilera	Dynamic Duet	Nominated	
Premios Juventud	2006	Ricky Martin	Best Moves	Nominated	
Premios Juventud	2007	Ricky Martin	My Idol Is…	Nominated	
Premios Juventud	2007	Ricky Martin	My Favorite Concert	Nominated	
Premios Juventud	2007	Ricky Martin	What a Hottie!	Nominated	
Premios Juventud	2007	"Tu Recuerdo" (featuring La Mari and Tommy Torres)	Best Ballad	Nominated	
Premios Juventud	2008	Ricky Martin	Best Moves	Nominated	
Premios Juventud	2008	Ricky Martin	Favorite Pop Star	Nominated	
Premios Juventud	2008	Ricky Martin	He's Got Style	Won	
Premios Juventud	2008	Ricky Martin	What a Hottie!	Won	
Premios Juventud	2008	Ricky Martin	My Idol Is...	Won	
Premios Juventud	2009	Ricky Martin	Best Moves	Nominated	
Premios Juventud	2010	Ricky Martin	Best Moves	Nominated	
Premios Juventud	2010	Ricky Martin	My Idol Is...	Nominated	
Premios Juventud	2010	"Somos el Mundo"	The Perfect Combo	Won	
Premios Juventud	2011	Ricky Martin	Best Moves	Nominated	
Premios Juventud	2011	Ricky Martin	Favorite Pop Star	Nominated	
Premios Juventud	2011	Ricky Martin	Síganme Los Buenos	Won	
Premios Juventud	2011	"Lo Mejor de Mi Vida Eres Tú" (featuring Natalia Jiménez)	The Perfect Combination	Nominated	
Premios Juventud	2011	"Lo Mejor de Mi Vida Eres Tú" (featuring Natalia Jiménez)	Catchiest Tune	Nominated	
Premios Juventud	2011	"Lo Mejor de Mi Vida Eres Tú" (featuring Natalia Jiménez)	My Favorite Video	Nominated	
Premios Juventud	2011	Música + Alma + Sexo	Your Favorite CD	Nominated	
Premios Juventud	2012	Ricky Martin	Best Moves	Nominated	
Premios Juventud	2012	Ricky Martin	Favorite Pop Artist	Nominated	
Premios Juventud	2012	Ricky Martin	Síganme Los Buenos	Nominated	
Premios Juventud	2012	Música + Alma + Sexo World Tour	My Favorite Concert	Nominated	
Premios Juventud	2013	Ricky Martin	Best Moves	Nominated	
Premios Juventud	2013	Ricky Martin	Síganme Los Buenos	Nominated	
Premios Juventud	2013	"Más y Más" (Draco Rosa featuring Ricky Martin)	The Perfect Combination	Nominated	
Premios Juventud	2013	"Más y Más" (Draco Rosa featuring Ricky Martin)	My Favorite Video	Nominated	
Premios Juventud	2014	"Adrenalina" (Wisin featuring Ricky Martin and Jennifer Lopez)	The Perfect Combination	Nominated	
Premios Juventud	2015	Ricky Martin	My Pop/Rock Artist	Nominated	
Premios Juventud	2016	One World Tour	My Favorite Concert	Won	
Premios Juventud	2017	"Vente Pa' Ca" (featuring Maluma)	The Perfect Combination	Nominated	
Premios Juventud	2017	"Vente Pa' Ca" (featuring Maluma)	Best Song For Singing	Nominated	
Premios Juventud	2019	Ricky Martin	High Fashion	Nominated	
Premios Juventud	2020	Ricky Martin	Agent of Change Award	Honoree	
Premios Juventud	2020	"Tiburones"	Video with a Purpose	Nominated	
Premios Juventud	2021	Ricky Martin	Ayudando A Sus Fans	Nominated	
Premios Juventud	2022	"Canción Bonita" (with Carlos Vives)	The Perfect Mix	Nominated	
Premios Juventud	2023	Play	Best Pop Album	Nominated	
Premios Juventud	2023	"A Veces Bien y a Veces Mal" (with Reik)	Pop Mix of the Year	Nominated	
Premios Mixup	2001	Ricky Martin (Sound Loaded)	English-language Artist	Nominated	
Premios Nuestra Tierra	2022	"Canción Bonita" (with Carlos Vives)	Pop Song	Nominated	
Premios Ondas	1996	Ricky Martin	Best Latin Revelation Artist	Won	
Premios Oye!	2012	Ricky Martin	Pop Male Solo Artist	Nominated	
Premios Radio y Televisión	2001	Ricky Martin	Gold Award	Nominated	
Premios Tu Música (Puerto Rico)	2001	La Historia	Best Special Recording	Won	
Premios Tu Música (Puerto Rico)	2003	Almas Del Silencio	Best Ballad Album	Won	
Premios Tu Música (Puerto Rico)	2003	"Tal Vez"	Best Song	Won	
Premios Tu Música Urbano	2019	"Fiebre" (with Wisin & Yandel)	Best Pop Urban Song	Nominated	
Premios TVyNovelas	1992	Ricky Martin	Best Revelation	Won	
Premios TVyNovelas	1992	Ricky Martin	Pert Plus Award: Best Hair Style	Won	
Primetime Emmy Awards	2018	Ricky Martin (The Assassination of Gianni Versace: American Crime Story)	Outstanding Supporting Actor in a Limited or Anthology Series or Movie	Nominated	
Promax Awards	2001	Ricky Martin (MTV Celebrates with Ricky Martin Live and Loaded)	Best Music Programme	Won	
Queerties Awards	2020	Ricky Martin & Jwan Yosef	Love Is Great Award	Nominated	
Queerties Awards	2021	"Simple"	Best Anthem	Nominated	
Quiero Awards (Argentina)	2011	"Frío" (featuring Wisin & Yandel)	Video of the Year	Won	
Quiero Awards (Argentina)	2014	"Vida"	Best Male Artist Video	Nominated	
Quiero Awards (Argentina)	2015	"La Mordidita" (featuring Yotuel)	Best Male Artist Video	Nominated	
Quiero Awards (Argentina)	2015	"La Mordidita" (featuring Yotuel)	Video of the Year	Nominated	
Quiero Awards (Argentina)	2015	"La Mordidita" (featuring Yotuel)	Best Choreography	Nominated	
Quiero Awards (Argentina)	2016	"Que Se Sienta El Deseo" (Wisin feat Ricky Martin)	Best Urban Video	Nominated	
Quiero Awards (Argentina)	2016	"Perdóname"	Best Melodic Video	Nominated	
Quiero Awards (Argentina)	2016	Ricky Martin	Best Instagramer Musician	Nominated	
Quiero Awards (Argentina)	2017	"Vente Pa' Ca" (featuring Maluma)	Best Pop Video	Nominated	
Quiero Awards (Argentina)	2018	"Fiebre" (with Wisin & Yandel)	Best Pop Video	Nominated	
Quiero Awards (Argentina)	2020	"Tiburones"	Best Melodic Video	Nominated	
Quiero Awards (Argentina)	2020	"Falta Amor" (with Sebastián Yatra)	Best Male Artist Video	Nominated	
Quiero Awards (Argentina)	2021	"Canción Bonita" (with Carlos Vives)	Best Pop Video	Nominated	
QV Readers' Choice Awards (Note: QV was an American magazine covering LGBT issues, launched in 1997.)	2000	Ricky Martin	Favorite Male Singer	Won	
QV Readers' Choice Awards	2000	Ricky Martin	Sexiest Latino	Won	
QV Readers' Choice Awards	2000	Ricky Martin	Favorite Gay Celebrity	Won	
Radio Music Awards	2000	Ricky Martin	Most Requested Artist/Song	Won	
Rennbahn Express Awards	1999	Ricky Martin	Star of the Year	Nominated	
Rennbahn Express Awards	1999	Ricky Martin	Male Singer of the Year	Won	
RTHK International Pop Poll Awards	2002	"Nobody Wants to Be Lonely" (with Christina Aguilera)	Top Duet/Various	Silver	
Ritmo Latino Awards (Note: Also known as "Premio de la Gente" or Latin Music Fan Awards.)	1999	Ricky Martin	Artist of the Year, Male or Female	Nominated	
Ritmo Latino Awards	1999	Vuelve	Album of the Year	Won	
Ritmo Latino Awards	1999	Vuelve	Male Pop Artist or Group of the Year	Won	
Ritmo Latino Awards	1999	"Livin' la Vida Loca"	Music Video of the Year	Won	
Ritmo Latino Awards	2001	Ricky Martin	Male Pop Artist or Group of the Year	Nominated	
Ritmo Latino Awards	2001	Ricky Martin	Most Popular Artist	Nominated	
Ritmo Latino Awards	2001	"Nobody Wants to Be Lonely" (with Christina Aguilera)	Music Video of the Year	Nominated	
Satellite Awards	2018	The Assassination of Gianni Versace: American Crime Story	Best Ensemble – Television Series	Won	
Soberano Awards		Ricky Martin	Soberano International	Honoree	
Telehit Awards	2008	Ricky Martin	Most Successful Latin Artist Worldwide	Honoree	
Telehit Awards	2010	Ricky Martin	Most important Latin artist	Honoree	
Telehit Awards	2011	Ricky Martin	Most important Latin artist in the World	Honoree	
Telehit Awards	2017	Ricky Martin	Artist of the Decade	Nominated	
Teen Choice Awards	1999	"Livin' la Vida Loca"	Choice Summer Song	Nominated	
Teen Choice Awards	1999	"Livin' la Vida Loca"	Choice Music Video	Nominated	
Teen Choice Awards	1999	"Livin' la Vida Loca"	Choice Music – Single	Nominated	
Teen Choice Awards	1999	Ricky Martin	Choice Music – Male Artist	Won	
Teen Choice Awards	1999	Ricky Martin	Choice Male Hottie	Nominated	
Teen Choice Awards	2000	Ricky Martin	Choice Male Artist	Nominated	
Teen Choice Awards	2001	"Nobody Wants to Be Lonely" (with Christina Aguilera)	Choice Music – Love Song	Nominated	
The Salvation Army		Ricky Martin	The Others Awards	Honoree	
TIP Report	2005	Ricky Martin	TIP Report Hero Award	Honoree	
VH1/Vogue Fashion Awards	1999	Ricky Martin	Most Fashionable	Nominated	
VH1/Vogue Fashion Awards	1999	"Livin' la Vida Loca"	Most Stylish Video	Nominated	
Viña del Mar International Song Festival	1993	Ricky Martin	Gaviota de Plata (Silver Seagull)	Silver	
Viña del Mar International Song Festival	2007	Ricky Martin	Gaviota de Plata	Silver	
Viña del Mar International Song Festival	2007	Ricky Martin	Gaviota de Plata	Silver	
Viña del Mar International Song Festival	2007	Ricky Martin	Antorcha de Plata (Silver Torch)	Silver	
Viña del Mar International Song Festival	2007	Ricky Martin	Antorcha de Oro (Gold Torch)	Gold	
Viña del Mar International Song Festival	2014	Ricky Martin	Gaviota de Oro (Gold Seagull)	Gold	
Viña del Mar International Song Festival	2014	Ricky Martin	Gaviota de Plata	Silver	
Viña del Mar International Song Festival	2014	Ricky Martin	Antorcha de Plata	Silver	
Viña del Mar International Song Festival	2014	Ricky Martin	Antorcha de Oro	Gold	
Viña del Mar International Song Festival	2020	Ricky Martin	Gaviota de Oro	Gold	
Viña del Mar International Song Festival	2020	Ricky Martin	Gaviota de Plata	Silver	
Videoclip Awards (Dominican Republic)	2019	"Fiebre" (with Wisin & Yandel)	Best Tropical / Fusion Video	Won	
VIVA Comet Awards	2000	Ricky Martin	Best Live Act	Nominated	
VIVA Comet Awards	2000	Ricky Martin	Best Latin Act	Nominated	
VIVA Comet Awards	2003	"Jaleo"	Best Video	Won	
World Music Awards	1999	Ricky Martin	World's Best-Selling Latin Artist	Won	
World Music Awards	2000	Ricky Martin	World's Best-Selling Male Pop Artist	Won	
World Music Awards	2000	Ricky Martin	World's Best-Selling Latin Artist	Won	
World Music Awards	2001	Ricky Martin	World's Best-Selling Male Pop Artist	Won	
World Music Awards	2001	Ricky Martin	World's Best-Selling Male Dance Artist	Won	
World Music Awards	2001	Ricky Martin	World's Best-Selling Latin Artist	Won	
World Music Awards	2014	Ricky Martin	Latin Legend Award	Honoree	
World Music Awards	2014	"Come with Me"	World's Best Song	Nominated	
World Music Awards	2014	"Come with Me"	World's Best Video	Nominated	
World Summit of Nobel Peace Laureates	2019	Ricky Martin	Peace Summit Award	Honoree	
Your World Awards (Premios Tú Mundo)	2012	Ricky Martin	Soy Sexy and I Know It	Nominated	
Your World Awards (Premios Tú Mundo)	2014	"Vida"	Party Starter Song	Nominated	
Your World Awards (Premios Tú Mundo)	2014	"Adrenalina" (Wisin featuring Ricky Martin and Jennifer Lopez)	Most Popular Song of the Year	Nominated	
Your World Awards (Premios Tú Mundo)	2014	Ricky Martin	Social Sensation	Nominated	
Your World Awards (Premios Tú Mundo)	2016	Ricky Martin	Favorite Pop Artist	Nominated	

== Other honors ==
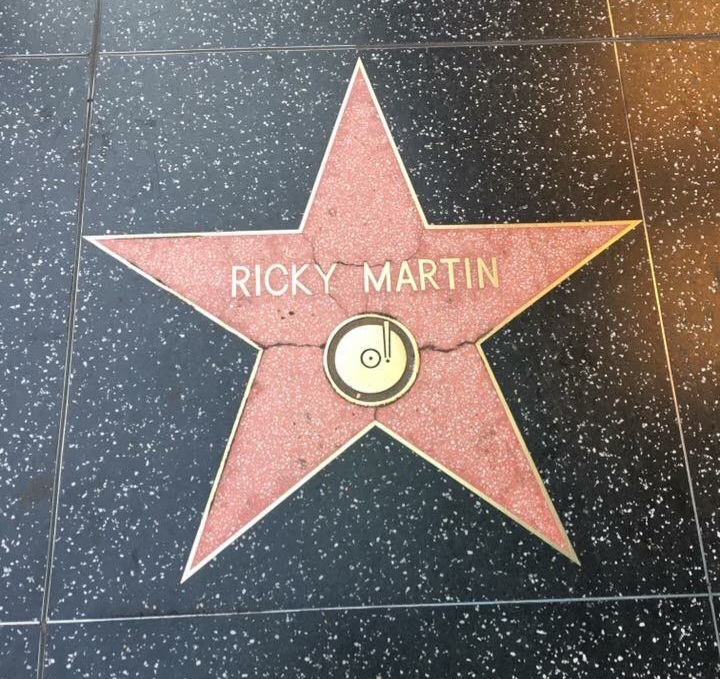
Ricky Martin's star on the Hollywood Walk of Fame

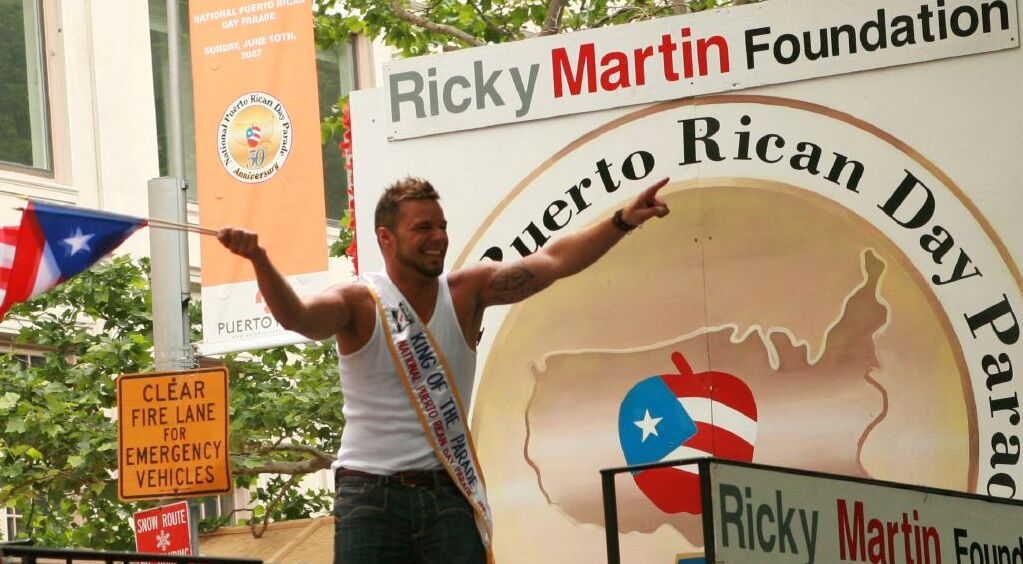
Ricky Martin crowned as "King of National Puerto Rican Day Parade" (2007)

List of state honors
Country	City/Gov./Entity	Year	Description	Status	Ref.
United States	Miami Beach/Mayor David Dermer	2007	Keys to the City	Honoree	
Puerto Rico	Puertican Governor Alejandro García Padilla	2014	Medal Roberto Clemente Walker	Honoree	
Albania	City of Tirana/Mayor Erion Veliaj	2023	Keys to the City	Honoree	
Spain	Provincial Council of Huesca	2024	Pirineos Sur Award in Cultural Diversity	Honoree	

List of cultural honors
Country	Year	Description	Status	Ref.
United States	2007	King of the Parade at National Puerto Rican Day Parade	Honoree	
United States	2019	Grand Marshal at National Puerto Rican Day Parade	Honoree	
Puerto Rico	2008	An inaugural award at the San Sebastián Street Festival	Honoree	

List of Walk of Fame/Hall of Fames
Walk/Hall of Fame	Year	Description	Status	Ref.
Plaza de las Estrellas		Walk of Star	Won	
Hollywood Walk of Fame	2007	Walk of Star	Won	
Puerto Rico's Walk of Fame	2016	Walk of Star	Won	
