= Black and White Tour =

2007 concert tour by Ricky Martin

- Tour by Ricky Martin
- Location: North America; South America; Europe
- Associated album: MTV Unplugged
- Start date: February 9, 2007
- End date: October 14, 2007
- Legs: 5
- No. of shows: 52 in North America; 9 in South America; 19 in Europe; 80 total

Ricky Martin concert chronology
- One Night Only with Ricky Martin (2005–06); Black and White Tour (2007); Música + Alma + Sexo World Tour (2011)

The Black and White Tour (Blanco y Negro Tour) was a worldwide concert tour by Puerto Rican singer Ricky Martin, in support of his 2006 album MTV Unplugged. The tour visited the Americas and Europe.

== Background ==
The show, directed for the stage by Jamie King included Ricky Martin's biggest hits, along with songs from his latest live album MTV Unplugged. The two-hour show was divided into four segments: tribal, romance, revolution and, rave.

The tour kicked off with four nights at the José Miguel Agrelot Coliseum in San Juan on February 9, 2007, and travelled to several countries in South and Central America. The Latin American leg of the Black and White Tour wrapped up in late March in Mexico.

The North American leg started at HP Pavilion at San Jose on April 17, 2007. It took Martin to arenas in 17 cities. Three shows from May 14–16 were cancelled (El Paso, Glendale and Albuquerque), after Martin suffered a lower back sprain during a show in Laredo.

In July 2007, Ricky Martin completed a series of sold-out arena dates in Europe, and announced the dates for a second American leg of his Black and White Tour. After playing in Puerto Rico and Mexico, the US portion of new run kicked off on September 29, 2007, at the Honda Center in Anaheim, and run through October 14, 2007. The last stop included the performance at the Madison Square Garden in New York City. Ricky Martin was also the inaugural act who played at the new Fillmore Miami Beach at the Jackie Gleason Theater on October 10–12, 2007.

== Set list ==
1. "Video Intro"
2. "Pégate" (contains excerpts of "Raza de Mil Colores" and "Por Arriba, Por Abajo")
3. "This Is Good"
4. Dance Interlude: "Indonesian Transition"
5. "Jaleo"/"I Don't Care"/"María"
6. Dance Interlude: "Hindu Transition"
7. "Vuelve"
8. "Gracias por Pensar en Mi"
9. "Fuego de Noche, Nieve de Día"
10. "She's All I Ever Had" (contains excerpts of "Bella")
11. "Rebirth" Video Intro
12. "Revolución"
13. "It's Alright"
14. "Livin' la Vida Loca"
15. "Somos la Semilla
16. "Asignatura Pendiente"
17. "Rave Intro"/"Drop It on Me
18. "Lola, Lola" / "La Bomba" / "The Cup of Life"
19. "Tal Vez"
20. "Tu Recuerdo"

== Tour dates ==
Date	City	Country	Venue
North America
February 9, 2007	San Juan	Puerto Rico	José Miguel Agrelot Coliseum
February 10, 2007	San Juan	Puerto Rico	José Miguel Agrelot Coliseum
February 11, 2007	San Juan	Puerto Rico	José Miguel Agrelot Coliseum
February 12, 2007	San Juan	Puerto Rico	José Miguel Agrelot Coliseum
February 16, 2007	Santo Domingo	Dominican Republic	Estadio Quisqueya
February 19, 2007	San José	Costa Rica	Estadio Ricardo Saprissa Aymá
February 22, 2007	Guatemala City	Guatemala	Estadio Mateo Flores
February 23, 2007	San Salvador	El Salvador	Gimnasio Nacional José Adolfo Pineda
South America
February 26, 2007^{[A]}	Viña del Mar	Chile	Quinta Vergara Amphitheater
February 28, 2007	Córdoba	Argentina	Orfeo Superdomo
March 2, 2007	Punta del Este	Uruguay	Salón Punta del Este
March 3, 2007	Buenos Aires	Argentina	River Plate Stadium
March 5, 2007	Tucumán	Argentina	Estadio Central Córdoba
March 7, 2007	Neuquén	Argentina	Rainbow Salon
March 9, 2007	Mendoza	Argentina	Estadio Malvinas Argentinas
March 11, 2007	Guayaquil	Ecuador	Medio Estadio Modelo
March 13, 2007	Caracas	Venezuela	Estadio Universitario de Caracas
North America
March 20, 2007	Panama City	Panama	Figali Convention Center
March 22, 2007	Guadalajara	Mexico	Arena VFG
March 24, 2007	Mexico City	Mexico	Palacio de los Deportes
March 25, 2007	Mexico City	Mexico	Palacio de los Deportes
March 27, 2007	Hermosillo	Mexico	Estadio Héroe de Nacozari
March 29, 2007	Chihuahua	Mexico	Estadio Chihuahua
March 30, 2007	Monterrey	Mexico	Monterrey Arena
March 31, 2007	Monterrey	Mexico	Monterrey Arena
April 17, 2007	San Jose	United States	HP Pavilion at San Jose
April 18, 2007	Fresno	United States	Save Mart Center
April 20, 2007	Los Angeles	United States	Staples Center
April 21, 2007	Las Vegas	United States	Mandalay Bay Events Center
April 22, 2007	San Diego	United States	iPayOne Center
April 25, 2007	Rosemont	United States	Allstate Arena
April 27, 2007	Fairfax	United States	Patriot Center
April 28, 2007	Uncasville	United States	Mohegan Sun Arena
April 30, 2007	Toronto	Canada	Air Canada Centre
May 1, 2007	Montreal	Canada	Bell Centre
May 4, 2007	Duluth	United States	Arena at Gwinnett Center
May 7, 2007	Hidalgo	United States	Dodge Arena
May 10, 2007	Corpus Christi	United States	American Bank Center Arena
May 11, 2007	Laredo	United States	Laredo Entertainment Center
May 19, 2007	Miami	United States	American Airlines Arena
May 20, 2007	Orlando	United States	Amway Arena
May 27, 2007	Washington, D.C.	United States	Verizon Center
Europe
June 27, 2007	Burgos	Spain	Estadio El Plantío
June 29, 2007	Antequera	Spain	Antequera Golf
June 30, 2007	Lisbon	Portugal	Pavilhão Atlântico
July 1, 2007	Almendralejo	Spain	Estadio Francisco de la Hera
July 3, 2007	Barcelona	Spain	Palau Sant Jordi
July 5, 2007^{[B]}	Monte Carlo	Monaco	Salle des Étoiles
July 6, 2007^{[B]}	Monte Carlo	Monaco	Salle des Étoiles
July 7, 2007	Madrid	Spain	Palacio de Deportes
July 8, 2007	Granada	Spain	Palacio Municipal de Deportes de Granada
July 10, 2007	Alicante	Spain	Plaza de toros de Alicante
July 11, 2007	Alzira	Spain	Estadio Luis Suñer Picó
July 13, 2007	Zaragoza	Spain	Plaza de Toros de Zaragoza
July 14, 2007	San Sebastián	Spain	Velódromo de Anoeta
July 16, 2007^{[C]}	Lucca	Italy	Piazza Napoleone
July 17, 2007^{[D]}	Rome	Italy	Ippodromo delle Capannelle
July 18, 2007	Salerno	Italy	Stadio Arechi
July 20, 2007	Acireale	Italy	Palatupparello
July 22, 2007^{[E]}	Rimini	Italy	Parco Marecchia
July 26, 2007	Santa Cruz de Tenerife	Spain	Campo de Futbol de Candelaria
North America
August 10, 2007	San Juan	Puerto Rico	José Miguel Agrelot Coliseum
August 11, 2007	San Juan	Puerto Rico	José Miguel Agrelot Coliseum
September 15, 2007	Monterrey	Mexico	Arena Monterrey
September 16, 2007	Monterrey	Mexico	Arena Monterrey
September 19, 2007	Zapopan	Mexico	Telmex Auditorium
September 21, 2007	Culiacán	Mexico	Estadio Carlos González
September 23, 2007	Chihuahua	Mexico	Estadio Chihuahua
September 25, 2007	Hermosillo	Mexico	Recinto Ferial y de Exposiciones
September 27, 2007	Tijuana	Mexico	Plaza de Toros Monumental de Tijuana
September 29, 2007	Anaheim	United States	Honda Center
September 30, 2007	Bakersfield	United States	Rabobank Arena
October 3, 2007	El Paso	United States	El Paso County Coliseum
October 5, 2007	Hidalgo	United States	Dodge Arena
October 6, 2007	Grand Prairie	United States	Nokia Live at Grand Prairie
October 7, 2007	Houston	United States	Toyota Center
October 10, 2007	Miami Beach	United States	The Fillmore Miami Beach
October 11, 2007	Miami Beach	United States	The Fillmore Miami Beach
October 12, 2007	Miami Beach	United States	The Fillmore Miami Beach
October 14, 2007	New York City	United States	Madison Square Garden

Festivals and other miscellaneous performances
^{A} Viña del Mar International Song Festival
^{B} Monte-Carlo Sporting Summer Festival
^{C} Lucca Summer Festival
^{D} Rock in Roma
^{E} Coca-Cola Live@MTV

Cancellations and rescheduled shows

May 12, 2007	Selma, Texas	Verizon Wireless Amphitheater	Cancelled
May 14, 2007	El Paso, Texas	El Paso County Coliseum	Cancelled
May 15, 2007	Glendale, Arizona	Jobing.com Arena	Cancelled
May 16, 2007	Rio Rancho, New Mexico	Santa Ana Star Center	Cancelled

=== Box office score data ===
- Only 33 out of 78 shows are available.

Venue	City	Tickets sold / available	Gross sales
José Miguel Agrelot Coliseum	San Juan	53,312 / 54,850 (97%)	$3,988,207
Estadio Ricardo Saprissa Aymá	San José	19,734 / 19,734 (100%)	$551,868
River Plate Stadium	Buenos Aires	43,549 / 46,306 (94%)	$1,018,206
Estadio Universitario de Caracas	Caracas	13,794 / 13,794 (100%)	$628,727
Figali Convention Center	Panama City	3,493 / 3,493 (100%)	$265,716
Arena VFG	Guadalajara	19,164 / 19,890 (96%)	$1,103,337
Palacio de los Deportes	Mexico City	29,616 / 35,466 (84%)	$1,496,160
HP Pavilion at San Jose	San Jose	7,106 / 7,429 (96%)	$352,638
Staples Center	Los Angeles	12,090 / 12,090 (100%)	$839,495
iPayOne Center	San Diego	9,102 / 9,102 (100%)	$553,540
Patriot Center	Fairfax	3,976 / 5,910 (67%)	$312,848
Mohegan Sun Arena	Uncasville	7,286 / 7,314 (100%)	$261,880
Air Canada Centre	Toronto	7,000 / 9,450 (74%)	$313,581
Bell Centre	Montreal	5,780 / 6,522 (89%)	$357,157
Dodge Arena	Hidalgo	5,987 / 5,987 (100%)	$405,416
Laredo Entertainment Center	Laredo	8,968 / 9,037 (99%)	$528,870
American Airlines Arena	Miami	12,258 / 12,258 (100%)	$811,858
Amway Arena	Orlando	6,684 / 8,932 (75%)	$473,124
José Miguel Agrelot Coliseum	San Juan	17,355 / 18,961 (92%)	$1,437,350
El Paso County Coliseum	El Paso	5,441 / 5,749 (95%)	$270,606
Dodge Arena	Hidalgo	4,293 / 4,677 (92%)	$235,592
Nokia Live at Grand Prairie	Grand Prairie	4,894 / 5,932 (83%)	$232,135
Toyota Center	Houston	7,186 / 7,595 (95%)	$324,350
The Fillmore Miami Beach	Miami Beach	5,908 / 7,041 (84%)	$563,291
Madison Square Garden	New York	8,639 / 11,276 (77%)	$790,515
Total		322,615 / 348,195 (93%)	$11,194,750

=== Record sellouts ===
On Billboard's Top 25 Tours of the first half of 2007 (between November 15, 2006, and May 15, 2007), Ricky Martin ranked at number 19. The tour grossed $13,124,673, with capacity 273,899 and attendance 250,463. Five shows out of twenty two were sold out. And on Billboard's Top 25 Boxscores of the same period, Martin ranked at number 15 with his Coliseo de Puerto Rico concerts which grossed $3,988,207.

== Broadcasts and recordings ==
Shows in Vina del Mar and Buenos Aires were broadcast on national televisions. Ricky Martin filmed a concert DVD at San Juan, Puerto Rico's José Miguel Agrelot Coliseum, on August 10–11, 2007. Ricky Martin Live: Black and White Tour was released on CD, DVD, CD/DVD on November 6, 2007, and on Blu-ray Disc on November 25, 2008.

== Personnel ==
- Creative producer – Jose Vega, Joyce Flemming, Veikko Fuhrmann
- Director – Carol Dodds
- Line producer – Monica Sosa
- Executive producer for TV, DVD and CD – Bruno Del Granado
- Artist – Ricky Martin
- Musical director, electric and acoustic guitars, cuatro, vocals – David Cabrera
- Electric and acoustic guitars, mandoline – RJ Ronquillo
- Keyboard – Ben Stivers
- Percussion – Daniel Lopez
- Drums – Waldo Madera
- Bass, cello – Phil McCarthur
- Background vocals – Carlos David Perez, Jackie Mendez
- Trumpet, vocals, percussion – Juan "Cheo" Quinones
- Saxophone, guitar, keys – Ron Dziubla
- Trombone, percussion, keys – Victor Vasquez
- Cuatro in "Tu Recuerdo" – Christian Nieves
- Featured artist in "Tu Recuerdo" – La Mari of Chambao
- Dance captain, choreographer – Jason Young
- Dancers – Micki Duran, Tony Francisco, Reshma Gajjar, Vlada Gorbeneva, Mihran Kirakosyan, Christopher "War" Martinez, Tye Myers
- Artistic directors – Dago Gonzales, Jamie King
- Lighting and stage designer – Roy Bennett
- Tour business manager – Anthony Cardona
- Tour director – Veikko Fuhrmann
- Tour production director – Chris Lamb
- Tour production manager – Vicki Huxel
- Road manager – Gabriela Araujo
- Tour press coordinator – Rondine Alcalá
- Tour ticketing – Puerto Rico – Gladys Martinez, Ruth Colon
- Fan club ticketing manager – Jennifer Naranjo
- Physical therapists – Aixa Tort, Urs Brand
- Capoeira instructor – Eric Marinho
- Choreographers – Richmond Talauega, Anthony Talauega, Jamaica Craft
- Hindu dance choreography – Yudhisthir Nayak, Patnak Sisters
- Tour security – Tulio Souza, Alves Da Costa
- Equipment manager – Angel Fernandez
- Theatrical stage manager – Jorge Guadalupe
- Stage manager – Thomas Kelleher
- Monitor engineer – Raaphael Alkins
- FOH engineer – Carloz Martinez
- RF engineer – Cesar William Benavides
- Audio analyst – Monty Carlo
- Backline – Dave Pennington, Jeremy Nielsen, Jimmy Robison
- Pro-tools and keyboard tech – Jose Merconchini
- Lighting engineer, operator – Federico Lafuente
- Lighting programmer – Cory Fitzgerald, Peter Aquinde
- Video crew chief – Omar Montes
- Video – Amanda Welker
- Advance site coordinator – John Conk
- Head carpenter – Ted Schroeder
- Carpenters – Dan Mcnabb, Patrick Harbin, Yader Mena
- Head rigger – Ken Mitchell
- Rigger – Ricky Acebo
- Motor control – Steve Haskins
- Pyro – Steve Aleff
- Cargo – Rock-it Cargo
- Stagging, barriers – All Access
- Catering – Chose Alfredo Diaz
- Transportation – Jonathan Ruiz
- Credentials, passes – Cube Passes
- Tour costume designer – Roman Diaz
- Head costume construction – Harwood Lee
- Costume supervisor – Julia Caugant
- Costume assistant – Jade Graham
- Head of Wardrobe for Ricky Martin – Rosennett Pagan
- Head of Wardrobe for band and dancers – Lana Czajka
- Video production and design – Veneno Inc.
- Creative director – Dago Gonzales
- Producer – Jessica Jimenez
- Production manager – Iván Navarro
- "Somos la Semilla" director, writer – Justin Lebanowski
- Project coordinator – Adriana Madrigal
- Research – Ariel De Los Santos
- Merchandising – Tribecka Latin, LLC.
- Travel agency – Ascot Travel, New York
- Booking agency – Chris Dalston
- Production managers – Mariauxy Castillo-Vitale, Sasha Yabrain
- Technical manager – Victor Lam
- Assistant director – Jill Dove
- Technical director – Mark Guillingham
- Lighting designer for DVD – Allen Branton
- Gaffer – David Oakes
- Programmer – Felix Peralta
- Video engineer – Billy Steinberg
- Video operator – Oscar Rodriguez
- Camera operators – John Atkinson, Manny Boniolla, David Driscoll, Tom Hildreth, Charlie Huntley, Mike Johnson, Raphy Molinary, Jorge Plana, Mark Whitman, Carlos Zayas
- Head of utility – Angel Vasquez
- Utility crew – Jerry Encarnacion, Juan Pablo Irrizarry, Jorge Irrizarry, Rene Rodriguez, Efrain Rosado-Mestre, Fernando Rosado, Samuel Salinas, Dustin Stephens, Juan A "Cheeze" Torres
- Script supervisor – Coraly Santaliz
- DVD costume designer – Carrie Cochran-Cabrera
- DVD costume stylist – Ed Coreano
- Hair and make-up – Wand Montes, Omar Rodriguez, Jacob Oliveras, Hidalkea Batista, Otto Ramos, Jennifer De Leon, Joel Torres, Yaya
- Casting – Kalain Santos
