= Juramento (song) =

Single by Ricky Martin

from the album Almas del Silencio
- Released: September 15, 2003
- Recorded: September 2002 – February 2003
- Genre: Latin pop
- Length: 3:34
- Label: Columbia
- Songwriters: Daniel López; George Noriega; Jon Secada
- Producer: George Noriega

Ricky Martin singles chronology
"Asignatura Pendiente" (2003)	"Juramento" (2003)	"Y Todo Queda en Nada" (2003)

Music videos
- "Juramento" on YouTube
- "Juramento" (The Way To Love) on YouTube

"Juramento" is a song by Ricky Martin, released as the second international single from his album Almas del Silencio (2003) after "Jaleo". It was released on September 15, 2003. The Spanglish version is called "Juramento (The Way to Love)". It is also the fourth overall single from Almas del Silencio.

== Music video ==
The music video was directed by Joseph Kahn and starred American actress and model Jenna Dewan. There are two versions: one for the Spanish version and one for the Spanglish version. The video features Ricky Martin clones with some special effects reminiscent of The Matrix Reloaded and was filmed in the desert landscape of California.

== Chart performance ==
The song reached number eleven in Spain, number forty-five in Italy, number fifty-seven in Switzerland and number ninety-two in Germany.

== Formats and track listings ==
European mini CD single

1. "Juramento (The Way to Love)" (Javier Garza Radio Edit; Spanglish) – 3:27
2. "Juramento" (Pablo Flores Dub) – 7:45

European CD single

1. "Juramento (The Way to Love)" (Javier Garza Radio Edit; Spanglish) – 3:27
2. "Juramento" (Pablo Flores Radio Edit; Spanish) – 4:03

European CD maxi-single

1. "Juramento (The Way to Love)" (Javier Garza Radio Edit; Spanglish) – 3:27
2. "Juramento (The Way to Love)" (Charles Dye Radio Edit; Spanglish) – 3:19
3. "Juramento (The Way to Love)" (Pablo Flores Club Mix; Spanglish) – 8:49
4. "Juramento" (Pablo Flores Radio Edit; Spanish) – 4:03

== Charts ==
Chart performance for "Juramento"
Chart (2003)	Peak position
Belgium (Ultratip Bubbling Under Flanders)	15
Germany (GfK)	92
Italy (FIMI)	45
Romania (Romanian Top 100)	16
Spain (Promusicae)	11
Switzerland (Schweizer Hitparade)	57
