= List of number-one Billboard Latin Pop Airplay songs of 2003 =

The most popular Latin pop songs in 2003, ranked by radio airplay audience impressions and measured by Nielsen BDS.

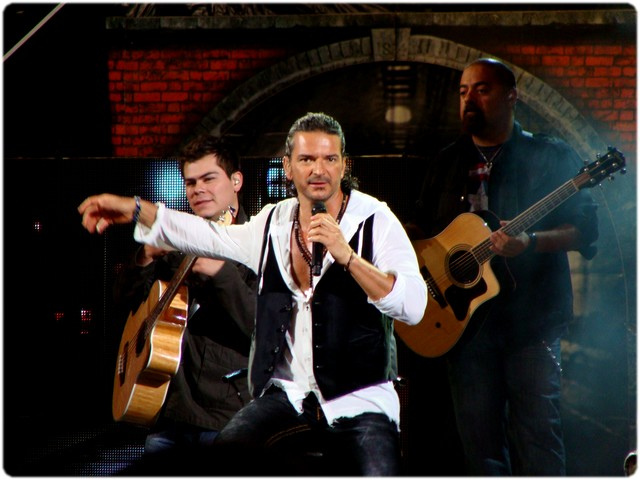
Singer Ricardo Arjona opened the year at the #1 position with the song "El Problema" (Eng: The Problem), this hit spent 12 consecutive weeks at the peak position between 2002 and 2003

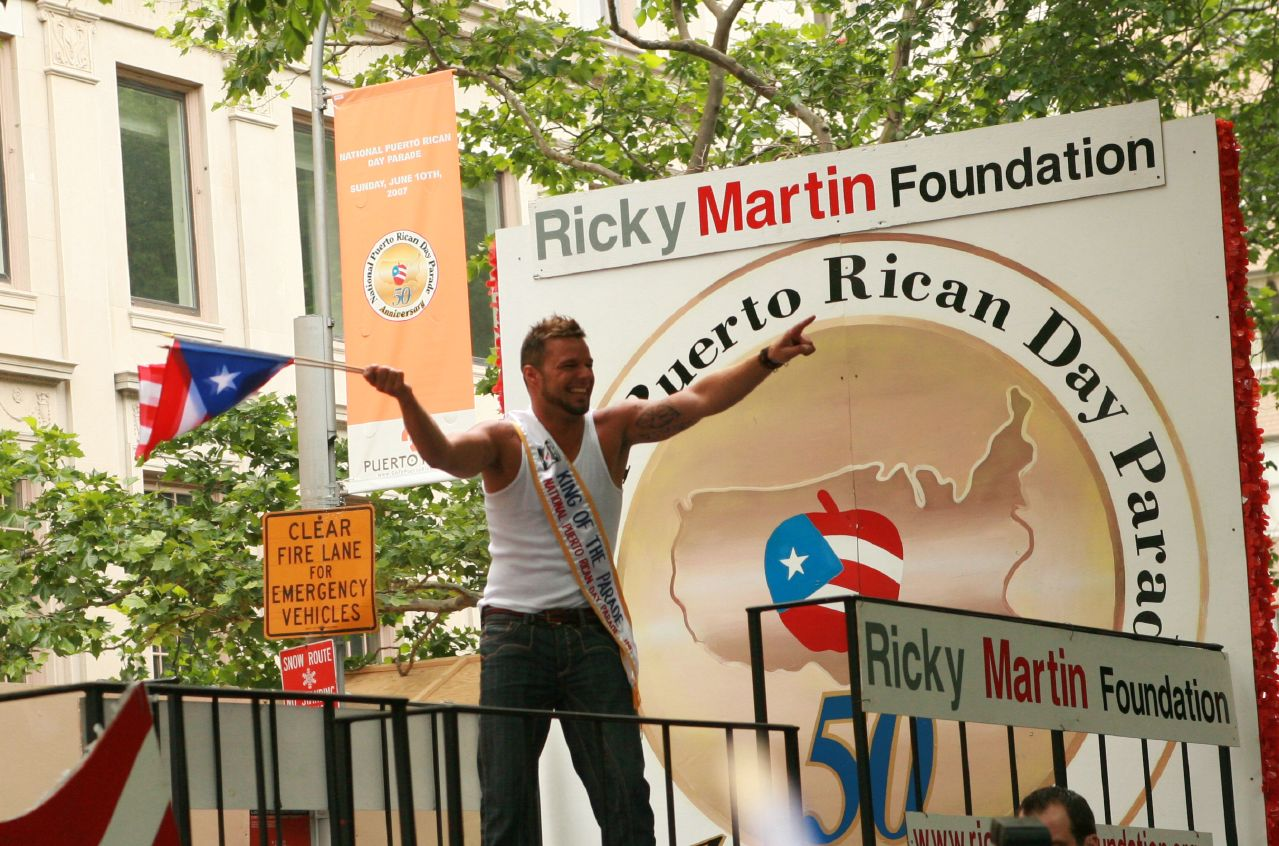
Singer Ricky Martin earned another hit for his career with the song "Tal Vez" (En: Perhaps), reaching the #1 spot for 13 non-consecutive weeks, becoming the longest-running for this year.

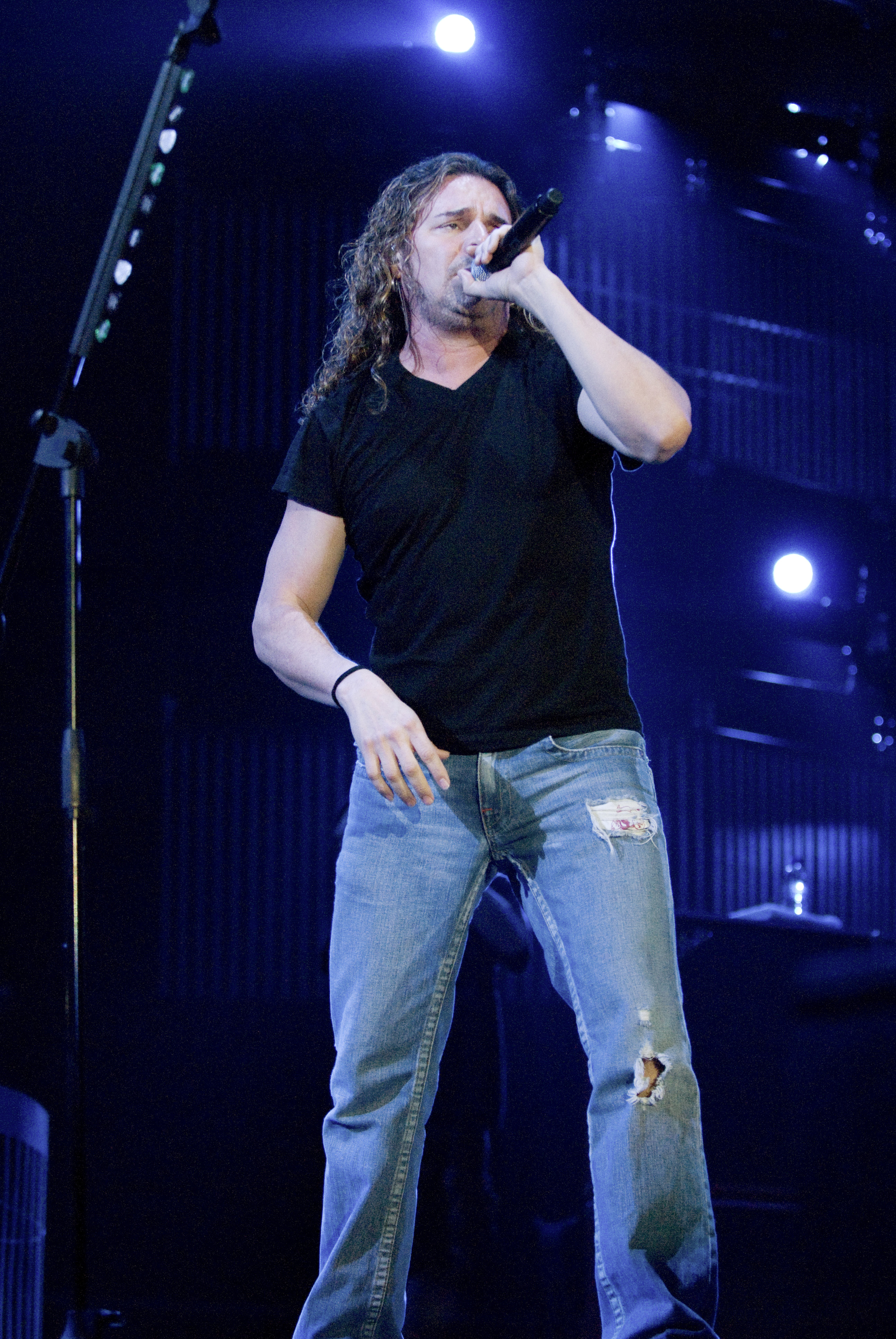
The group Maná earned the #1 spot with the hit "Mariposa Traicionera" (Eng: Treacherous Butterfly) which belong to their album Revolución de Amor, this song spent just one week at the peak position.

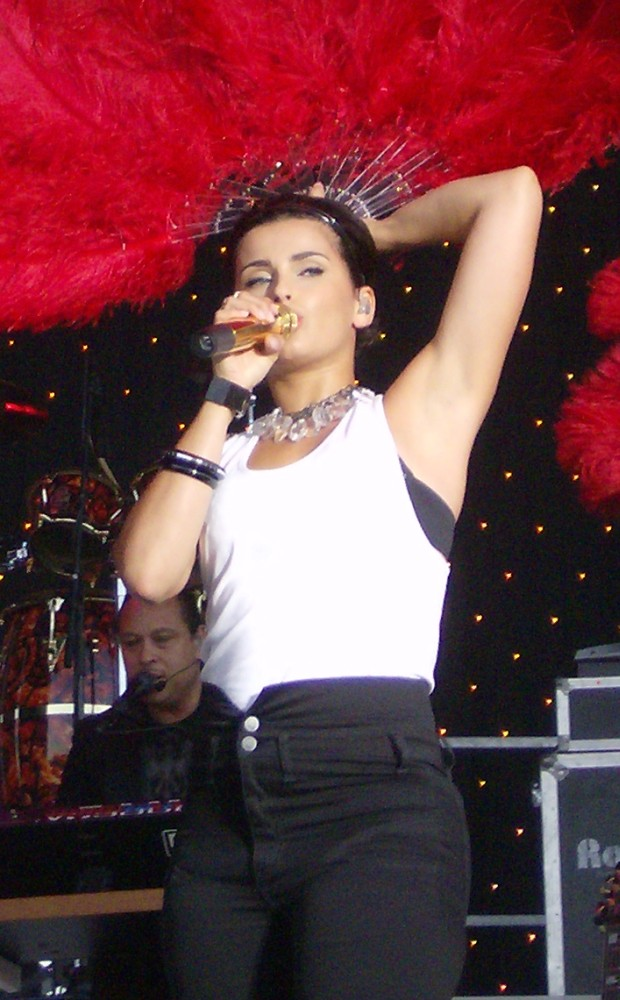
Singer Nelly Furtado along with Juanes reached the #1 position with the hit "Fotografía" (Eng: Photograph), spending in the privilege spot for 7 weeks. Nelly became the third non-Latin singer to reach the peak position in the airplay list

Issue date	Song	Artist(s)	Ref.
January 4	"El Problema"	Ricardo Arjona	
January 11	"El Problema"	Ricardo Arjona	
January 18	"El Problema"	Ricardo Arjona	
January 25	"El Problema"	Ricardo Arjona	
February 1	"El Problema"	Ricardo Arjona	
February 8	"El Problema"	Ricardo Arjona	
February 15	"El Problema"	Ricardo Arjona	
February 22	"Quizás"	Enrique Iglesias	
March 1	"Que Me Quedes Tú"	Shakira	
March 8	"Que Me Quedes Tú"	Shakira	
March 15	"Sedúceme"	La India	
March 22	"Que Me Quedes Tú"	Shakira	
March 29	"En Cuerpo y Alma"	Millie	
April 5	"Ámame"	Alexandre Pires	
April 12	"Tal Vez"	Ricky Martin	
April 19	"Tal Vez"	Ricky Martin	
April 26	"Tal Vez"	Ricky Martin	
May 3	"Tal Vez"	Ricky Martin	
May 10	"Tal Vez"	Ricky Martin	
May 17	"Tal Vez"	Ricky Martin	
May 24	"Tal Vez"	Ricky Martin	
May 31	"Tal Vez"	Ricky Martin	
June 7	"Tal Vez"	Ricky Martin	
June 14	"Tal Vez"	Ricky Martin	
June 21	"Tal Vez"	Ricky Martin	
June 28	"Tal Vez"	Ricky Martin	
July 5	"Mariposa Traicionera"	Maná	
July 12	"Tal Vez"	Ricky Martin	
July 19	"Fotografía"	Juanes featuring Nelly Furtado	
July 26	"Fotografía"	Juanes featuring Nelly Furtado	
August 2	"Fotografía"	Juanes featuring Nelly Furtado	
August 9	"Fotografía"	Juanes featuring Nelly Furtado	
August 16	"Fotografía"	Juanes featuring Nelly Furtado	
August 23	"Fotografía"	Juanes featuring Nelly Furtado	
August 30	"Fotografía"	Juanes featuring Nelly Furtado	
September 6	"Un Siglo Sin Ti"	Chayanne	
September 13	"Un Siglo Sin Ti"	Chayanne	
September 20	"Un Siglo Sin Ti"	Chayanne	
September 27	"Un Siglo Sin Ti"	Chayanne	
October 4	"Un Siglo Sin Ti"	Chayanne	
October 11	"Un Siglo Sin Ti"	Chayanne	
October 18	"Un Siglo Sin Ti"	Chayanne	
October 25	"Te Necesito"	Luis Miguel	
November 1	"Te Necesito"	Luis Miguel	
November 8	"Te Necesito"	Luis Miguel	
November 15	"Te Necesito"	Luis Miguel	
November 22	"Te Necesito"	Luis Miguel	
November 29	"Te Necesito"	Luis Miguel	
December 6	"Te Necesito"	Luis Miguel	
December 13	"Mientes Tan Bien"	Sin Bandera	
December 20	"Mientes Tan Bien"	Sin Bandera	
December 27	"Mientes Tan Bien"	Sin Bandera	
