= RJ Ronquillo =

Filipino-American guitarist and YouTube personality

- Born: 1976 (age 49–50); Detroit, Michigan, U.S.
- Occupations: Guitarist, YouTuber
- Instrument: Guitar
- Years active: 2002-present
- Website: www.rjronquillo.com

RJ Ronquillo (born 1976 in Detroit, MI) is an American session and touring guitarist and YouTube personality. He has performed and recorded with artists such as Ricky Martin, Santana, Tupac Shakur, Stone Sour, Stevie Wonder, Chaka Khan, and Corey Taylor . He is known for his YouTube channel which focuses on guitar gear demos, guitar lessons, and behind-the-scenes tour vlogs.

== Early life and education ==
Ronquillo was born in Detroit, Michigan and grew up in Grosse Pointe, an eastern suburb. He attended the Grosse Pointe Academy from preschool through eighth grade, and Grosse Pointe South High School. He attended the Frost School of Music at the University of Miami in Coral Gables, Florida and graduated with a bachelor of music degree in Studio Music & Jazz for guitar.

== Touring & recording career ==
In 2001, while living in South Florida, Ronquillo began touring and recording with Jamaican reggae band, Inner Circle. In 2002 he recorded rhythm guitars for the song, "Why Don't You & I", on the Santana album Shaman. In 2006, he played on Ricky Martin's MTV Unplugged album and DVD, after which he joined the touring band for Martin's 2007 Black and White Tour. In January 2009, Ronquillo joined the LA based hard rock band, The Chelsea Smiles, and recorded on their 2009 self-titled album. In 2010, he toured with Latin pop singer, Chayanne, for his No Hay Imposibles world tour. In 2018, he joined Stone Sour in 2018 during the bands tour of the US and Canada while Josh Rand was in rehab for alcohol addiction.

== YouTube ==
Ronquillo began his YouTube career in 2011, with a series of guitar demos for the Canadian guitar brand, Eastwood Guitars.

== Discography ==
- Shaman - Santana (2002)
- Better Dayz - 2Pac (2002)
- After The Storm - Monica (2003)
- Grand Champ - DMX (2003)
- MTV Unplugged - Ricky Martin (2006)
- Ricky Martin Live: Black and White Tour - Ricky Martin (2007)
- The Chelsea Smiles - The Chelsea Smiles (2009)
- Studio Live Session - Judith Hill (2019)
- Re-Imaginos - Albert Bouchard (2020)
- Imaginos II:Bombs Over Germany (minus zero and counting) - Albert Bouchard (2021)
