= Con Tu Nombre =

Single by Ricky Martin

from the album MTV Unplugged
- Released: June 26, 2007
- Recorded: 2006
- Genre: Latin pop
- Length: 4:20
- Label: Columbia
- Songwriters: Cristian Zalles; Juan Carlos Pérez Soto
- Producer: Tommy Torres

Ricky Martin singles chronology
"Gracias por Pensar en Mi" (2007)	"Con Tu Nombre" (2007)	"Non siamo soli" (2007)

Live Performance
- "Con Tu Nombre" on YouTube

"Con Tu Nombre" (English: "With Your Name") is the fourth single from Ricky Martin's first live album, MTV Unplugged (2006). It was released on June 26, 2007. The song was written by Cristian Zalles and Juan Carlos Pérez Soto, and produced by Tommy Torres. The Salsa Version was produced by Mike Rivera.

== Chart performance ==
In the United States, the song reached number forty-seven on Billboard's Hot Latin Songs chart and number fifteen on Latin Pop Airplay.

== Formats and track listings ==
US promotional CD single

1. "Con Tu Nombre" (Radio Edit) – 3:43
2. "Con Tu Nombre" (Salsa Version) – 3:55

Mexican digital single

1. "Con Tu Nombre" (Salsa Version) – 3:55

== Charts ==
Chart (2007)	Peak position
US Hot Latin Songs (Billboard)	47
