= MTV Unplugged (Ricky Martin album) =

Live album by Ricky Martin
- Released: November 7, 2006
- Recorded: August 17, 2006, in Miami, Florida
- Genre: Latin; pop rock; Latin pop; dance-pop
- Label: Columbia; Sony BMG Norte
- Producer: Tommy Torres

Ricky Martin chronology
Life (2005)	MTV Unplugged (2006)	Ricky Martin... Live Black & White Tour (2007)

Ricky Martin video chronology
Europa: European Tour (2001)	MTV Unplugged (2006)	Ricky Martin... Live Black & White Tour (2007)

Singles from MTV Unplugged
- 1. "Tu Recuerdo" Released: September 25, 2006; 2. "Pégate" Released: December 19, 2006; 3. "Gracias por Pensar en Mi" Released: March 20, 2007; 4. "Con Tu Nombre" Released: June 26, 2007

Professional ratings
Review scores
Source	Rating
About.com	5/5 stars
AllMusic	3/5 stars
Los Angeles Times	3.5/4 stars

MTV Unplugged is the first live album by Puerto Rican singer Ricky Martin. It was released to the market in CD and DVD formats by Sony BMG Norte on November 7, 2006. It has been certified platinum and gold worldwide.

== Background ==
MTV Unplugged was taped on August 17, 2006, in Miami. It premiered on MTV Latin America, MTV Tr3s and MTV Puerto Rico in October 2006. This album includes Puerto Rican influences, particularly "Tu Recuerdo" (based mainly on a Puerto Rican "aguinaldo jíbaro", and finishing with an "aguinaldo orocoveño") and "Pégate", a Puerto Rican plena. Christian Nieves plays the Puerto Rican cuatro on both tracks.

== Formats ==
The album was re-released as a CD and DVD combo-package in May 2007. An exclusive Wal-Mart packaging was made available with the original CD purchase and a DVD titled "The Making of Ricky Martin MTV Unplugged", which includes a 40-minute behind the scenes documentary and the music video to "Tu Recuerdo". The music video for "Tu Recuerdo" is just an extracted live performance of the song from MTV Unplugged.

== Commercial performance ==
In the United States, MTV Unplugged debuted at number one on the Top Latin Albums and number thirty-eight on the Billboard 200, with first week sales of 29,000 copies. It has also charted inside top ten in Argentina, Spain and Mexico.

MTV Unplugged was certified 2× Platinum Latin award in the United States, Diamond in Mexico, 2× Platinum in Argentina, and Gold in Spain. In the US, it has sold over 197,000 copies.

Three new tracks on the album included: "Tu Recuerdo", which topped the Hot Latin Songs for three weeks and peaked at number eighty-nine on the Billboard Hot 100; "Pégate", second single that peaked at number eleven on the Hot Latin Songs and number six on the Hot Dance Club Songs and "Con Tu Nombre", which peaked at number forty-seven on the Hot Latin Songs. "Gracias por Pensar en Mi" also received airplay in the United States and Mexico. The album has sold over two million copies worldwide.

== Accolades ==
Year	Ceremony	Award	Result
2007	Billboard Latin Music Awards	Latin Pop Album of the Year, Male	Nominated
2007	Latin Grammy Awards	Album of the Year	Nominated
2007	Latin Grammy Awards	Best Male Pop Vocal Album	Won
2007	Latin Grammy Awards	Best Long Form Music Video	Won
2008	Premio Lo Nuestro	Pop Album of the Year	Won

== Track listing ==
CD/DVD
No.	Title	Writer(s)	Producer(s)	Length
1.	"Gracias por Pensar en Mi"	Renato Russo; Ricky Martin	Tommy Torres	4:38
2.	"Con Tu Nombre"	Cristian Zalles; Juan Carlos Pérez Soto	Torres	4:20
3.	"María"	Ian Blake; K. C. Porter; Luis Gómez-Escolar	Torres	5:31
4.	"Tu Recuerdo" (featuring La Mari of Chambao and Tommy Torres)	Torres	Torres	4:07
5.	"Perdido Sin Ti"	Rosa; Porter; Gómez-Escolar	Torres	4:26
6.	"Asignatura Pendiente"	Ricardo Arjona	Torres	4:19
7.	"Vuelve"	Franco De Vita	Torres	5:35
8.	"Lola, Lola"	Rosa; Porter; Gómez-Escolar	Torres	4:20
9.	"Volverás"	Blake; Porter; Gómez-Escolar; Martin	Torres	5:05
10.	"La Bomba"	Rosa; Porter; Gómez-Escolar	Torres	5:49
11.	"Fuego de Noche, Nieve de Día"	Blake; Porter; Gómez-Escolar	Torres	5:12
12.	"Pégate"	Martin; Roy Tavaré; Torres	Torres	4:05

Japanese bonus tracks
No.	Title	Writer(s)	Producer(s)	Length
13.	"Pégate" (Echo & Diesel Remix)	Martin; Roy Tavaré; Torres	Torres	3:38

Wal-Mart exclusive DVD bonus
No.	Title	Length
1.	"The Making of Ricky Martin MTV Unplugged"	40:00

== Personnel ==
- Raphael Alkins Engineer
- Wanda Berrios Make-Up, Cabelo
- Gustavo Borner Engineer
- Richard Bravo Percussion
- David Cabrera Guitar (Acoustic), Director, Spanish Guitar, Coros
- Andrés Casanova Assistant Engineer
- Albert Centrella Audio Production
- Bob Clearmountain Engineer
- Roger Cooper Product Manager
- Omar Cruz Photography
- Guillermo Cubero Guiro, Pandereta Seguidor
- Mari DeChambao Performer
- Bruno Del Granado Executive Producer
- Roman Diaz Stylist
- Brett Dicus Engineer
- Brandon Duncan Assistant
- Ron Dziubla Saxophone
- Scott Flavin Violin
- Paul Forat A&R
- Chris Glansdorp Cello
- Ted Jensen Mastering
- Hardi Kamsani Digital Editing
- Daniel Lopez Percussion
- Waldo Madera Bateria
- Richard Martinez Pandereta Seguidor
- Hector "Tito" Matos Pandereta Requinto
- Phil McArthur Double Bass, Bajo Sexto
- Christian Nieves Cuatro
- George Noriega Guitar
- Scott ODonnell Viola
- Luis Olazabal Photography
- Alfredo Oliva Violin
- Carlos David Pérez Choirs
- Carlos Perez Graphic Design, Creative Director
- Liza Quin Choirs
- Juan Jose Restrepo Accordion
- Luis Aquino Trumpet
- R.J. Ronquillo Guitar (Acoustic), Mandolin, Spanish Guitar
- Erik Noel Rosado
- Charlie Singer Producer, Executive Producer
- Ben Stivers Piano, Wurlitzer
- Jose Tillán Producer/Executive Producer
- Tommy Torres Producer
- Victor Vazquez Trombone
- Mike Rivera Producer Versíon Salsa
- Immanuel Ramirez Ingeniero Versíon Salsa
- Jose Luis Vega Image Design

== Charts ==
=== Weekly charts ===
Chart (2006)	Peak position
Argentinian Albums (CAPIF)	2
Italian Albums (FIMI)	74
Mexican Albums (AMPROFON)	2
Portuguese Albums (AFP)	28
Spanish Albums (Promusicae)	6
US Billboard 200	38
US Top Latin Albums (Billboard)	1
US Latin Pop Albums (Billboard)	1
US Music Video Sales (Billboard)	5

=== Monthly charts ===
Chart (2006)	Position
Uruguayan Albums (CUD)	2

=== Year-end charts ===
Chart (2006)	Position
Argentine Albums (CAPIF)	13
Mexican Albums (AMPROFON)	30

Chart (2007)	Position
Mexican Albums (AMPROFON)	11
US Top Latin Albums (Billboard)	13
US Latin Pop Albums (Billboard)	5

=== Decade-end charts ===
Chart (2000s)	Position
US Top Latin Albums (Billboard)	92

== Certifications and sales ==
=== Album ===
Region	Certification	Certified units/sales
Argentina (CAPIF)	2× Platinum	80,000^{^}
Central America (CFC)	3× Platinum	
Mexico (AMPROFON)	2× Platinum	200,000^{^}
Mexico (AMPROFON) Preloaded digital	Diamond+2× Platinum+Gold	750,000^{*}
Spain (Promusicae)	Gold	40,000^{^}
United States (RIAA)	2× Platinum (Latin)	200,000^{^}
Venezuela (APFV)	Platinum	
^{*} Sales figures based on certification alone.^{^} Shipments figures based on certification alone.

=== DVD ===
Region	Certification	Certified units/sales
Argentina (CAPIF)	Platinum	8,000^{^}
United States (RIAA)	Gold	50,000^{^}
^{^} Shipments figures based on certification alone.

== Release history ==
Region	Date	Label	Format	Catalog
Hong Kong	November 7, 2006	Sony BMG	CD	
Taiwan	January 16, 2007	Sony Music	CD	88697009092
Taiwan	February 8, 2007	Sony Music	DVD	88697–009109
Japan	March 21, 2007	Sony Music Japan	CD	SICP-1388

== See also ==
- List of number-one Billboard Latin Pop Albums from the 2000s
- List of number-one Billboard Top Latin Albums of 2006
- List of best-selling Latin albums
- List of best-selling albums in Mexico
