= Almas del Silencio =

2003 studio album by Ricky Martin

Studio album by Ricky Martin
- Released: May 20, 2003
- Recorded: September 2002 - February 2003
- Studios: Bogart Studios; Crescent Moon Studios; Critiera Moon Studios; Diginote Studios; EQ's Recording Studios; The Gallery Recording Studios; Macondo Studios; Normad Music Studios; Outline Studios; Peaceful Studios (Miami, Florida, U.S.); Record One Studios; Capitol Recording Studios (Los Angeles, California, U.S.); Soundstage Studios (Nashville, Tennessee, U.S.); The Hit Factory (New York City, New York, U.S.); JL Recording Studios (Guaynabo, Puerto Rico)
- Genres: Latin pop; pop rock; Soft rock; latin ballad
- Length: 50:23
- Language: Spanish
- Labels: Sony Discos; Columbia
- Producers: Tommy Torres; Emilio Estefan, Jr.; Juan Vicente Zambrano; Luis Fernando Ochoa; Estéfano; George Noriega; Daniel López

Ricky Martin chronology
The Best of Ricky Martin (2001)	Almas del Silencio (2003)	Life (2005)

Singles from Almas del Silencio
- 1. "Tal Vez" Released: March 24, 2003; 2. "Jaleo" Released: April 21, 2003; 3. "Asignatura Pendiente" Released: July 14, 2003; 4. "Juramento" Released: September 8, 2003; 5. "Y Todo Queda en Nada" Released: November 3, 2003

Professional ratings
Review scores
Source	Rating
AllMusic	2.5/5 stars

Almas del Silencio (English: Souls from the Silence) is the seventh studio album and fifth Spanish-language album recorded by the Puerto Rican-American recording artist Ricky Martin. This is the first Spanish album release since 1998's Vuelve. The album which was released by Sony Discos and Columbia Records on May 20, 2003 in 38 non-Hispanic countries and reached top ten in Spain, Switzerland, Italy, Portugal, Norway and Finland.

== Background and development ==
Martin initially planned to release an English-language album, which was supposed to be his first complete work in the field of songwriting. He changed his mind:

I woke up five months ago, and I said 'We're doing an album in Spanish.' Everyone went nuts. They said, 'You don't have time; you have to release an album in English because of timing issues with your career.' And that's fine. But I told them, 'In five months, you'll have a kick-ass album' [in Spanish].

Martin noted about the language: "Many countries are releasing [this album] simply as Ricky Martin's next album, period. They know me as a Latino who recorded an album in English. And the next English-language album will be Ricky Martin's next album, period."

Martin said of the new album: "I really needed to go back to focus, to my center, to the beginning. I had the need to search within, and really dig deep, and find those emotions that, because of the adrenaline and the euphoria that I lived for a couple of years, were probably sabotaged." Therefore, he asked the songwriters for tracks that "reflect his own state of mind, expressing his yearning for his native Puerto Rico and for the simpler things in life."

== Singles ==
"Tal Vez" was released as the lead single of Almas del Silencio on March 24, 2003, it was written by the Venezuelan singer-songwriter Franco De Vita, who wrote Vuelve, the title track of the last album in Spanish from Martin. "Tal Vez" is a radical ballad that never turns cloying. The single debuted at No. 1 on the US Hot Latin Tracks, It was the first time that list has seen a No. 1 debut since February 7, 1998, when Los Temerarios "Porque Te Conoci" (Why Did I Meet You) bowed in the top slot, then spent 11 weeks on top of the Hot Latin Songs. "Tal Vez" also debuted at No. 1 on the Latin Pop Airplay (thirteen weeks on top) and at No. 4 on the list of Tropical Airplay (weeks later it reached number one). It also reached number seventy-four on the Billboard Hot 100, thanks to its seventy-three peak on the Hot 100 Airplay. "Tal Vez" topped the Billboard Top Latin Songs Year-End Chart. Also reached number 1 in Argentina, Chile, Central America, Mexico and Venezuela. Martin performed "Tal Vez" at the Latin Billboard Music Awards on May 8 in Miami.

"Jaleo" it was the first international single and the second single from the album. It was released on April 21, 2003, internationally and in June 2003 in the United States. "Jaleo", a Spanish word with various definitions, but it basically means "to clap" or, rather, yell out words of excitement such as "¡olé!" and "¡eso!" usually during flamenco and merengue performances. The song has reached number one on the Billboard Hot Latin Tracks and number two on the Latin Pop Airplay. He also entered the charts in Belgium, Germany, France, Norway, Sweden and Japan with the single achieving the top 10 positions in Spain (# 1 for four weeks), Italy and Sweden and Top 30 entries in Denmark, Holland and Switzerland.

"Asignatura Pendiente" was released as the third single on July 14, 2003. The song was written by Guatemalan singer-songwriter Ricardo Arjona and produced by Tommy Torres, is about the artist's experiences, whatever it may be, not only Ricky Martin, but in the mouth of the Puerto Rican singer. This refers to his beginnings with the famous group Menudo", how success has influenced his life and the nostalgia he feels far from his native Puerto Rico, which also applies to Ricardo Arjona, due to his ex-wife and very good friends of the island. In "Asignatura Pendiente" lovelessness, sacrifice and lived rewards are evidenced. The song has reached number five on the Billboard Hot Latin Tracks and number four on the Latin Pop Airplay.

"Juramento" it was the second international single and the fourth single from the album. It was released on September 8, 2003. The Spanglish version is called "Juramento (The Way to Love)". The song reached number eleven in Spain, number forty-five in Italy, number fifty-seven in Switzerland and number ninety-two in Germany.

"Y Todo Queda en Nada" is the fifth and final single from the album. It was released as a promotional single on November 3, 2003, in Latin territories. The song reached number one on the Hot Latin Tracks in the United States and stayed at the top for one week. It arrived at peak number nine on the Billboard Bubbling Under Hot 100, it also peaked at number two on the Latin Pop Airplay and Latin Tropical Airplay. In 2004 the song he stayed with number 4 of Billboard Top Latin Songs Year-End Chart. On February 26, in Miami, Martin performed "Y todo Queda en Nada" along with "Jaleo" at the Premio Lo Nuestro.

== Commercial performance ==
Almas del Silencio released by Sony Discos debuted at number one on the US Top Latin Albums and stayed there for six weeks. The album has also made the highest charting debut on the Billboard 200 (# 12) of any Spanish-language album in the SoundScan era, selling more than 65,000 copies the first week.

In total, he sold 261,000 copies in the US. It was certified 4× Platinum Latin award by the Recording Industry Association of America (RIAA), indicating shipments of over 400,000 copies in the country. Outside the United States, it was certified Platinum in Spain and Argentina, and Gold in Mexico and Switzerland. The album has sold over two million copies worldwide.

== Awards and nominations ==
Year	Ceremony	Award	Result
2003	Premios Tu Música	Best Ballad Album	Won
2003	American Music Awards	Favorite Latin Artist	Won
2004	Lo Nuestro Awards	Pop Album of the Year	Nominated
2004	Latin Billboard Music Awards	Latin Pop Album of the Year, Male	Won
2004	Latin Grammy Awards	Best Male Pop Vocal Album	Nominated
2004	Premios Juventud	CD To Die For	Nominated

== Track listing ==
No.	Title	Writer(s)	Producer(s)	Length
1.	"Jaleo"	Antonio Rayo "Rayito"; José Miguel Velásquez	Tommy Torres	3:43
2.	"Tal Vez"	Franco De Vita	Tommy Torres	4:40
3.	"Jamás"	Emilio Estefan, Jr.; Tony Mardini; Ricardo Gaitán; Alberto Gaitán; Nicolás Tovar	Emilio Estefan, Jr.	3:09
4.	"Si Tú Te Vas"	Juanes	Luis Fernando Ochoa	4:22
5.	"Nadie Más Que Tú"	Daniel López; Tommy Torres; Ricky Martin; Raúl del Sol	Tommy Torres; Daniel López	4:21
6.	"Besos de Fuego"	Yasmil Marrufo; Juan Vicente Zambrano	Juan Vicente Zambrano; Daniel López	4:25
7.	"Asignatura Pendiente"	Ricardo Arjona	Tommy Torres	3:57
8.	"Juramento"	Daniel López; George Noriega; Jon Secada	George Noriega	3:33
9.	"Y Todo Queda en Nada"	Estéfano; Julio C. Reyes	Estéfano	4:37
10.	"Si Ya No Estás Aquí"	Emilio Estefan, Jr.; Tony Mardini; Ricardo Gaitán; Alberto Gaitán; Nicolás Tovar	Emilio Estefan, Jr.	3:05
11.	"Raza de Mil Colores"	Daniel López; Yasmil Marrufo; Juan Vicente Zambrano	Juan Vicente Zambrano; Daniel López	3:35
12.	"Las Almas del Silencio"	Alejandro Sanz	Tommy Torres	3:31
13.	"Jaleo" (Spanglish)	Antonio Rayo "Rayito"; José Miguel Velásquez; Jodi Marr	Tommy Torres	3:41
14.	"Exclusive Interview Footage"
Total length:				50:23

== Charts ==
=== Weekly charts ===
Chart (2003)	Peak position
Argentine Albums (CAPIF)	1
Australian Albums (ARIA)	21
Austrian Albums (Ö3 Austria)	28
Belgian Albums (Ultratop Flanders)	34
Belgian Albums (Ultratop Wallonia)	29
Dominican Albums (Musicalia)	3
Dutch Albums (Album Top 100)	28
European Albums (Top 100)	16
Finnish Albums (Suomen virallinen lista)	9
French Albums (SNEP)	35
German Albums (Offizielle Top 100)	17
Greek Foreign Albums (IFPI)	1
Hungarian Albums (MAHASZ)	27
Italian Albums (FIMI)	3
Japanese Albums (Oricon)	59
Polish Albums (ZPAV)	14
Norwegian Albums (VG-lista)	6
Portuguese Albums (AFP)	4
Spanish Albums (PROMUSICAE)	2
Swedish Albums (Sverigetopplistan)	17
Swiss Albums (Schweizer Hitparade)	2
US Billboard 200	12
US Top Latin Albums (Billboard)	1
US Latin Pop Albums (Billboard)	1

=== Year-end charts ===
Chart (2003)	Position
Norwegian End of School Period Albums (VG-lista)	19
Swiss Albums (Schweizer Hitparade)	40
US Top Latin Albums (Billboard)	2
US Latin Pop Albums (Billboard)	2

=== Decade-end charts ===
Chart (2000s)	Position
US Top Latin Albums (Billboard)	50

== Certifications and sales ==
Region	Certification	Certified units/sales
Argentina (CAPIF)	Platinum	40,000^{^}
France	—	65,000
Mexico (AMPROFON)	Gold	140,000
Portugal (AFP)	Silver	10,000^{^}
South Korea (RIAK)	—	14,197
Spain (Promusicae)	Platinum	100,000^{^}
Switzerland (IFPI Switzerland)	Gold	20,000^{^}
United States (RIAA)	4× Platinum (Latin)	400,000^{^}
Summaries
Worldwide	—	2,000,000
^{^} Shipments figures based on certification alone.

== Release history ==
Release dates and formats for Almas del Silencio
Region	Date	Format(s)	Label(s)	Ref.
Hong Kong	May 20, 2003	CD	Columbia Records	
Taiwan	May 20, 2003	CD	Columbia Records	
Japan	June 18, 2003	CD	Sony Music Japan	

== See also ==
- List of best-selling Latin albums
