= Y Todo Queda en Nada =

2003 single by Ricky Martin

Single by Ricky Martin

from the album Almas del Silencio
- Released: December 1, 2003
- Recorded: 2003
- Studio: Midnight Blue Studios; Bogart Recording Studios (Miami, FL); Capitol Recording Studios (Los Angeles, CA)
- Genre: Latin pop; rock; latin ballad
- Length: 4:37
- Label: Sony Discos
- Songwriters: Estéfano; Julio C. Reyes
- Producer: Estéfano

Ricky Martin singles chronology
| "Juramento" (2003) | "Y Todo Queda en Nada" (2003) | "I Don't Care" (2005) |

Music video
- "Y Todo Queda en Nada" on YouTube

"Y Todo Queda en Nada" (English: And Everything Will Remain in Nothing) is a ballad performed by the Puerto Rican-American recording artist Ricky Martin, taken from his seventh studio album and fifth made in Spanish Almas del Silencio (2003). It was released as the album's fifth and final single by Sony Discos on December 1, 2003, in the Latin territories. The song witch written by Estéfano and co-wrriten by Julio Reyes Copello, while the production was in charge of Estéfano.

== Music video ==
Gustavo Garzón directed the music video for "Y Todo Queda en Nada". He previously worked with Ricky Martin on the videos for "Te Extraño, Te Olvido, Te Amo", "Fuego de Noche, Nieve de Día" and "Perdido Sin Ti". It stars Venezuelan model Luzia Vivas, who in an interview said:

the story of the video is very romantic, it is about a girl who leaves him, then he becomes obsessed with her and feels that he sees her everywhere, even in the faces of others women". Besides, we do not have contact until the end of the video when I appear in a window and Ricky tries to touch me, but I suddenly disappear, it is very melancholic, indicated.

The clip was filmed in different locations in Mexico City during his visit to the country and was premiered in the program ¡Despierta América!, of the Univision chain.

== Chart performance ==
The song reached number one on the Hot Latin Tracks in the United States and stayed at the top for one week. It also peaked at number two on the Latin Pop Airplay and Tropical Songs.

== Awards and nominations ==
| Year | Ceremony | Award | Result | Ref. |
|---|---|---|---|---|
| 2005 | Lo Nuestro Awards | Pop Song of the Year | Nominated | |
| 2005 | ASCAP Latin Awards | Song of the Year | Won | |
| 2005 | ASCAP Latin Awards | Pop/Ballad Winning Song | Won | |
| 2005 | BMI Latin Awards | Winning Songs | Won | |

== Formats and track listings ==
Mexican promotional CD single

1. "Y Todo Queda en Nada" – 4:37

Argentinian promotional CD single

1. "Y Todo Queda en Nada" – 4:37

== Charts ==
=== Weekly charts ===
| Chart (2003/2004) | Peak position |
|---|---|
| Mexico (Associated Press) | 7 |
| US Bubbling Under Hot 100 (Billboard) | 9 |
| US Radio Songs (Billboard) | 82 |
| US Hot Latin Songs (Billboard) | 1 |
| US Latin Pop Airplay (Billboard) | 2 |
| US Tropical Airplay (Billboard) | 2 |

=== Year-end charts ===
| Chart (2004) | Position |
|---|---|
| US Hot Latin Tracks (Billboard) | 4 |
| US Latin Pop Songs (Billboard) | 3 |

== See also ==
- List of number-one Billboard Hot Latin Tracks of 2004
