= Gracias por Pensar en Mi =

Single by Ricky Martin

from the album MTV Unplugged
- Released: March 20, 2007
- Recorded: 2006
- Genre: Latin pop
- Length: 4:38
- Label: Columbia
- Songwriters: Renato Russo; Ricky Martin
- Producer: Tommy Torres

Ricky Martin singles chronology
"Pégate" (2006)	"Gracias por Pensar en Mi" (2007)	"Con Tu Nombre" (2007)

Live Performance
- "Gracias por Pensar en Mi" on YouTube

"Gracias por Pensar en Mi" (English: "Thank You for Thinking of Me") is the third single from Ricky Martin's first live album, MTV Unplugged (2006). Released on March 20, 2007, it was originally included on Martin's 1998 album Vuelve. "Gracias por Pensar en Mi" is a Spanish-language adaptation of Legião Urbana's song "A Via Láctea" from their album A Tempestade ou O Livro dos Dias 1996.

== Chart performance ==
In the United States, the song reached number twenty-one on Billboard's Latin Pop Airplay chart. It was also certified 4× Platinum by AMPROFON in Mexico for sales of over 400,000 downloads.

== Formats and track listings ==
Mexican digital single

1. "Gracias por Pensar en Mi" – 4:38

== Charts and certifications ==
=== Weekly charts ===
Chart (2007)	Peak position
Uruguay (Associated Press)	1
US Latin Pop Airplay (Billboard)	21

=== Certifications and sales ===
Region	Certification	Certified units/sales
Mexico (AMPROFON) Pre-loaded single	4× Platinum	400,000^{*}
^{*} Sales figures based on certification alone.
