= Tal Vez =

2003 single by Ricky Martin

Single by Ricky Martin

from the album Almas del Silencio
- Language: Spanish
- English title: "Perhaps"
- Released: March 25, 2003
- Genre: Rock
- Length: 4:39
- Label: Sony Discos; Columbia
- Songwriter: Franco De Vita
- Producer: Tommy Torres

Ricky Martin singles chronology
"Relight My Fire" (2003)	"Tal Vez" (2003)	"Jaleo" (2003)

Music video
- "Tal Vez" on YouTube

"Tal Vez" (transl. "Perhaps") is a song recorded by Puerto Rican singer Ricky Martin for his seventh studio album, Almas del Silencio (2003). The song was written by Venezuelan singer-songwriter Franco De Vita, while the production was handled by Tommy Torres. It was released to radio stations by Sony Discos as the lead single from the album on March 25, 2003. A Spanish language rock ballad, it is a romantic song about regret, lost opportunities, and last chances. The song received widely positive reviews from music critics, who complimented its melody, lyrics, and Martin's vocals. It was ranked as one of the Top Latin Songs of the Century by Latin Times.

"Tal Vez" was nominated for Song of the Year at the 4th Annual Latin Grammy Awards and won the awards for Hot Latin Song of the Year and Latin Pop Airplay Track of the Year, Male at the 2004 Latin Billboard Music Awards. The song was commercially successful, reaching number one in Argentina, Chile, Central America, Mexico and Venezuela, as well as Billboard's Hot Latin Tracks, Latin Pop Airplay, and Tropical Airplay charts in the United States. It spent a total of 11 non-consecutive weeks atop the Hot Latin Tracks chart, surpassing "Livin' la Vida Loca" as Martin's longest number-one single on the chart, and was the longest-running number one of 2003.

The accompanying music video was filmed in La Boca near Buenos Aires, and directed by Kacho López and Carlos Pérez. It depicts the daily life of the residents of a building, including the singer. To promote the song, Martin performed it at the 2003 Latin Billboard Music Awards. The track was also included on the set lists for the One Night Only with Ricky Martin tour, the Black and White Tour, the Live in Mexico tour, the One World Tour, and the Ricky Martin en Concierto.

== Background and release ==
Ricky Martin released his fifth studio album and English-language debut, Ricky Martin in 1999, which became his biggest commercial success, selling over 15 million copies worldwide. It was followed by another English album, Sound Loaded in 2000. He initially planned to release the third English-language album as his seventh studio album, which was supposed to be his first album in which he wrote or co-wrote all songs. Despite Martin and Sony Music Entertainment's original plan, he decided to release a Spanish-language album:

I woke up five months ago, and I said 'We're doing an album in Spanish.' Everyone went nuts. They said, 'You don't have time; you have to release an album in English because of timing issues with your career.' And that's fine. But I told them, 'In five months, you'll have a kick-ass album' [in Spanish].

He finished working on the album on March 8, 2003. Two days later, his then manager Angelo Medina talked about the album in an interview with El Nuevo Día. He revealed the album's title as Almas del Silencio, mentioning that it has been set for release in May. "Tal Vez" was released to radio stations as the lead single from the album on March 25, 2003. In Mexico, it was launched as a promotional CD single on the same date. Medina explained to Billboard that they asked Venezuelan singer-songwriter Franco De Vita to write the song, since "he's a composer that knows Ricky well; they have a connection". De Vita had previously composed Martin's 1998 song "Vuelve". "Tal Vez" was included as the second track on Martin's seventh studio album, Almas del Silencio, released May 20, 2003. The track was also later added to Martin's compilation albums 17 (2008), Personalidad (2015), and Esencial (2018). A salsa version of the song was recorded and was later included on the compilation album Baladas en Salsa (2004).

== Music and lyrics ==
"Tal Vez"
A 27-second sample of the chorus, which features a slow rock melody.

Musically, "Tal Vez" is a Spanish language rock ballad with a piano and string instruments. The track was produced by Puerto Rican musician Tommy Torres and runs for a total of 4 minutes and 39 seconds. According to the song's sheet music on Musicnotes.com, "Tal Vez" is composed in the key of B major with a groove of 58 beats per minute. Martin's vocals span from the low note of D_{4} to the high note of G_{5}. Lyrically, "Tal Vez", which translates to "Perhaps" in English, is a romantic song about regret and is an "aching reflection on lost opportunities and last chances", according to the Los Angeles Times. The lyrics include, "Tal vez nunca te he dado lo que tu esperabas / Y no estaba cuando me necesitabas / Tal vez no te escuché / Tal vez me descuide / Tal vez se me olvido que yo te amaba" (Maybe I've never given you what you expected / And I wasn't there when you needed me / Maybe I didn't listen to you / Maybe I neglected you / Maybe I forgot that I loved you).

== Critical reception ==
"Tal Vez" was met with widely positive reviews from music critics. Leila Cobo from Billboard described its melody as "soaring" and "catchy", explaining its lyrics as "simple - yet not simplistic". She also complimented Martin's vocals for being "raspier and more earnest than on past albums". An author of Daily News labeled it "a classy romantic ballad", and Miami Herald's Jordan Levin named it "a soaring ballad". An author of Radio Cooperativa described it as Martin's "most intense ballad". Writing for the El Paso Times, Melissa Martinez noted its similarity with previous ballads and stated: "The heartache just seeps through each word and leaves you wanting to reach out and make it all better." Mario Tarradell of The Herald-News gave the song a positive review, saying it is "an undeniable hit, a sweeping ballad that never turns cloying". An editor for El Tiempo likened Martin recording the salsa version of the song to trying on a different shirt size. Carlos Mario Castro from El Sabanero X named "Tal Vez" Martin's third-best song, mentioning that it "undoubtedly rescues the values inherent in the singer's Puerto Rican origin", following his crossover to English. In 2015, Univision staff ranked the track as Martin's eighth-best ballad, while Claudia González Alvarado from Chilango ranked it as his seventh-best ballad in 2021, naming it one of Martin's "most classic songs". MTV Argentina also ranked it as one of his best songs in 2020. In his review for Vogue in 2021, Esteban Villaseñor ranked the song among Martin's most popular songs.

=== Accolades ===
In 2013, Latin Times ranked "Tal Vez" at number 15 on their list of "The Top 35 Latin Songs of the Century". The song has received a number of awards and nominations. It was nominated for Song of the Year at the 4th Annual Latin Grammy Awards, but lost to "Es Por Ti" by Juanes. It won the award for Best Song at the 2003 Premios Tu Música. At the 2004 Latin Billboard Music Awards, "Tal Vez" won the awards for Hot Latin Song of the Year and Latin Pop Airplay Track of the Year, Male. The track was also nominated for Pop Song of the Year at the 2004 Lo Nuestro Awards. It was honored as Latin Song of the Year at the 2004 ASCAP Latin Awards.

== Commercial performance ==
"Tal Vez" is one of Martin's most commercially successful songs in his career. In the United States, it debuted at number one on the Billboard Hot Latin Tracks chart on the week of April 12, 2003, marking the first number one debut since February 7, 1998, and becoming the sixth song overall in the chart's history to do so. It spent a total of 11 non-consecutive weeks at this position, surpassing "Livin' la Vida Loca" as Martin's longest number-one single on the chart, and was the longest-running number one of 2003. "Tal Vez" also debuted at the top of the Latin Pop Airplay chart, where it spent thirteen weeks at this position, tying with "Tu Recuerdo" as his longest-running number song on the chart. In addition, it topped the Tropical Airplay chart. On the year-end charts, it was the best-performing Latin song and Latin pop song of the year in the US. The song also peaked at numbers 74 and 73 on the US Billboard Hot 100 and Hot 100 Airplay charts, respectively. Besides the United States, the song reached number one in multiple Latin American markets. It topped the charts in Argentina, Chile, Central America, Mexico and Venezuela.

== Promotion ==
=== Music video ===
A screenshot from the music video, depicting Martin singing the song while standing in front of a broken window.

On March 31, 2003, La Nación revealed that Martin began filming a music video for "Tal Vez". The video was filmed in a factory in La Boca, a barrio of Buenos Aires, Argentina, the same setting where the video for his hit "María" was set. It was produced by Paradiso Films under the direction of Kacho López and Carlos Pérez. The visual was aired on April 24, 2003, on Telemundo. The video depicts the daily life of the residents of a building, including Martin. According to El Universal, López managed to capture a real story about universal love, addressing the song's lyrics in the music video. The video won the award for Video of the Year at the 2003 Premios de la Gente. Cristal Mesa from mitú ranked "Tal Vez" as Martin's tenth best music video on her 2018 list, and an author of Cultura Colectiva listed it among the "13 Videos to Appreciate Ricky Martin's Talent and Sickening Good Looks". The video was uploaded on the singer's YouTube channel on October 3, 2009, but was made unavailable after receiving 27.5 million views. A remastered version of the video was also uploaded on Martin's YouTube channel on the same date, which has received over 65 million views, as of November 2021.

=== Live performances ===
Martin describes "Tal Vez" as a song he will "never stop singing". He gave his first live performance of the song at the 2003 Latin Billboard Music Awards on May 8, 2003. The track was included on the set lists for Martin's the One Night Only with Ricky Martin tour, the Black and White Tour, the Live in Mexico tour, the One World Tour, and the Ricky Martin en Concierto. He also performed the song along with his other hits during the 48th, 55th, and 61st editions of the Viña del Mar International Song Festival in 2007, 2014, and 2020, respectively.

== Formats and track listings ==
- Australian promotional CD single
1. "Tal Vez" (Radio Edit) – 4:21
2. Special Greeting – 0:13
- European promotional CD single
1. "Tal Vez" (Album Version) – 4:41
- US / Latin American promotional CD single
1. "Tal Vez" (Radio Edit) – 4:15
- US promotional CD single
1. "Tal Vez" (salsa version) – 4:07

== Credits and personnel ==
Credits adapted from Tidal and the US promotional CD single liner notes.

Studio locations

- Recorded at – Dharmik Studio, Bogart Recording (Miami, Florida), EQ's Studio (Miami, Florida), Capitol Studios (Hollywood, California), Sound Stage Studios (Nashville, Tennessee), and Diginote Studios (Miami, Florida)
- Mixed At – Mix This! (Los Angeles, California)
- Mastered At – Sterling Sound (Nashville, Tennessee)

Personnel

- Ricky Martin – vocal, associated performer, background vocal
- Franco De Vita – composer, lyricist
- Tommy Torres – producer, arranger, background vocal, tambourine
- Dan Warner – acoustic guitar, electric guitar
- David Campbell – arranger
- Kevin Harp – assistant engineer
- Tobin Reinfried – assistant engineer
- Jamey Soule – assistant engineer
- Alex Al – bass
- Rudy Stein – cello
- Steve Richards – cello
- Larry Corbett – cello
- Suzie Katayama – cello
- Lee Levin – drums
- Ted Jensen – mastering engineer
- Bob Clearmountain – mixing engineer
- Matt Rollings – piano
- Chuck Ainlay – recording engineer
- Bob St. John – recording engineer
- Charles Dye – recording engineer
- Richie Pérez – recording engineer
- Steve Churchyard – recording engineer
- Matt Funes – viola
- John Hayhurst – viola
- Jorge Moraga – viola
- Bob Becker – viola
- Joel Derouin – violin
- Endre Granat – violin
- Bruce Dukov – violin
- Charlie Bisharat – violin
- Ken Yerke – violin
- Mark Robertson – violin
- Peter Kent – violin
- Natalie Leggett – violin
- Sara Parkins – violin
- Susan Chatman – violin
- Mario DeLeon – violin
- Michele Richards – violin
- Gerardo Hilera – violin
- Eve Butler – violin
- Berj Garabedian – violin
- Darius Campo – violin

== Charts ==
=== Weekly charts ===
Weekly peak performance for "Tal Vez"
Chart (2003)	Peak position
Argentina (Associated Press)	1
Chile (Associated Press)	1
Central America (Associated Press)	1
Finland (Finnish Top 50 Hits)	43
Mexico (Associated Press)	1
Poland (Polish Airplay Chart)	25
US Billboard Hot 100	74
US Hot Latin Songs (Billboard)	1
US Latin Pop Airplay (Billboard)	1
US Tropical Airplay (Billboard)	1
Venezuela (Associated Press)	1

=== Year-end charts ===
2003 year-end chart performance for "Tal Vez"
Chart (2003)	Peak position
US Hot Latin Songs (Billboard)	1
US Latin Pop Airplay (Billboard)	1
US Tropical Airplay (Billboard)	21

=== Decade-End charts ===
2000s decade-end chart performance for "Tal Vez"
Chart (2000–2009)	Position
US Hot Latin Songs (Billboard)	63
US Latin Pop Airplay (Billboard)	37

=== All-time charts ===
All-time chart position for "Tal Vez"
Chart	Position
US Latin Pop Songs (Billboard)	17

== Release history ==
Release dates and formats for "Tal Vez"
Region	Date	Format(s)	Label	Ref.
Mexico	March 25, 2003	Promotional CD single	Columbia Records	
United States	March 25, 2003	Contemporary hit radio	Sony Discos	

== See also ==
- 2003 in Latin music
- Billboard Hot Latin Songs Year-End Chart
- List of Latin songs on the Billboard Hot 100
- List of number-one Billboard Hot Latin Tracks of 2003
- List of number-one Billboard Latin Pop Airplay songs of 2003
- List of number-one Billboard Hot Tropical Songs of 2003
