= Pégate =

Single by Ricky Martin

Single by Ricky Martin

from the album MTV Unplugged
- Released: December 19, 2006
- Recorded: 2006
- Genre: Latin pop; Tropical; Plena
- Length: 4:04
- Label: Columbia; Sony BMG Norte
- Songwriters: Ricky Martin; Roy Tavaré; Tommy Torres
- Producer: Tommy Torres

Ricky Martin singles chronology
"Tu Recuerdo" (2006)	"Pégate" (2006)	"Gracias por Pensar en Mi" (2007)

Live Performance
- "Pégate" on YouTube

"Pégate" (English: "Get Closer") is the second single from Ricky Martin's first live album, MTV Unplugged (2006). It was released on December 19, 2006. The song was written by Martin, Roy Tavaré and Tommy Torres, and produced by Torres.

== Composition ==
The song is a traditional plena rhythm, a popular Puerto Rican genre played with three hand held drums or tambourines, among other instruments. In "Pégate", the traditional plena drums are played by the percussionists of the band Viento de Agua, led by Tito Matos. Cuatro, a traditional string instrument from Puerto Rico, is played by Christian Nieves.

== Chart performance ==
In the United States, "Pégate" peaked at number eleven on Billboard's Hot Latin Songs and at number nine on Latin Pop Airplay and Tropical Songs. It also reached number twenty-five on Latin Rhythm Airplay. With the help of remixes by Ralphi Rosario, "Pégate" also peaked at number six on the Dance Club Songs chart. In Spain, the song reached number thirteen on the Digital Singles Chart. In Mexico, the digital single was certified 4× Platinum for sales of over 400,000 copies.

== Awards ==
"Pégate" won the ASCAP Latin Award in category Pop/Ballad Winning Song and also won the BMI Latin Award.

== Formats and track listings ==
US promotional CD single

1. "Pégate" (Radio Edit) – 3:10
2. "Pégate" (Album Version) – 4:05

US promotional CD maxi-single

1. "Pégate" (Ralphi Rosario Radio Mix) – 3:58
2. "Pégate" (Ralphi Rosario Hard Club Vox) – 8:25
3. "Pégate" (Ralphi's Dirty Dub) – 13:39
4. "Pégate" (Ralphi Rosario Radio Mix - Instrumental) – 3:58
5. "Pégate" (Ralphi Rosario Hard Club Vox - Instrumental) - 8:21
6. "Pégate" (Echo & Diesel Remix) – 3:37

== Charts and certifications ==
=== Weekly charts ===
Weekly chart performance for "Pégate"
Chart (2007)	Peak position
Mexico (Associated Press)	2
Spain (Promusicae)	13
US Dance Club Songs (Billboard)	6
US Hot Latin Songs (Billboard)	11
US Tropical Airplay (Billboard)	9

=== Year-end charts ===
Chart (2007)	Position
US Latin Pop Songs (Billboard)	15

Chart (2018)	Position
Puerto Rico Pop (Monitor Latino)	86

Chart (2019)	Position
Puerto Rico Pop (Monitor Latino)	77

Chart (2020)	Position
Puerto Rico Pop (Monitor Latino)	90

2023 year-end chart performance for "Pégate"
Chart (2023)	Position
Puerto Rico Pop (Monitor Latino)	74

=== Certifications and sales ===
Region	Certification	Certified units/sales
Mexico (AMPROFON) Pre-loaded	4× Platinum	400,000^{*}
^{*} Sales figures based on certification alone.
