= Asignatura Pendiente =

Single by Ricky Martin

from the album Almas del Silencio
- Released: August 11, 2003
- Recorded: 2003
- Studio: Dhamirk Recording Studios; The Hit Factory-Critiera (Miami, Florida, USA); Record One (Los Angeles, California, USA)
- Genre: Latin pop; Latin ballad
- Length: 3:57
- Label: Sony Discos; Columbia
- Songwriter: Ricardo Arjona
- Producer: Tommy Torres

Ricky Martin singles chronology
"Jaleo" (2003)	"Asignatura Pendiente" (2003)	"Juramento" (2003)

Audio
- "Ricky Martin - Asignatura Pendiente (Audio)" on YouTube

"Asignatura Pendiente" (English: Unresolved Matter) is the third single from Ricky Martin's album, Almas del Silencio (2003). It was released by Sony Discos and Columbia Records on August 11, 2003, in Latin territories. The song was written by Guatemalan singer-songwriter Ricardo Arjona and produced by Tommy Torres. The original version by Arjona was recorded before and remained unpublished until its release in his 2004 Solo album.

A music video was also released.

== Chart performance ==
"Asignatura Pendiente" reached number five on the Billboard Hot Latin Tracks in the United States.

== Formats and track listings ==
US promotional CD single

1. "Asignatura Pendiente" – 3:57

== Charts ==
Chart (2003)	Peak position
US Hot Latin Songs (Billboard)	5
US Latin Pop Airplay (Billboard)	4
US Tropical Airplay (Billboard)	38
