= Jaleo (Ricky Martin song) =

Single by Ricky Martin

from the album Almas del Silencio
- Released: May 2, 2003
- Recorded: 2002–03
- Genre: Latin pop; Dance-pop
- Length: 3:41
- Label: Sony Discos; Columbia
- Songwriters: Antonio Rayo "Rayito"; José Miguel Velásquez; Jodi Marr
- Producer: Tommy Torres

Ricky Martin singles chronology
"Tal Vez" (2003)	"Jaleo" (2003)	"Asignatura Pendiente" (2003)

Music video
- "Jaleo" on YouTube

"Jaleo" (Fuss) is the first international and second US single from Ricky Martin's album Almas del Silencio (2003). It was released on May 2, 2003 internationally and in July 2003 in the United States. "Jaleo", a Spanish word of Hebrew origin, has various meanings: to clap or yell out words such as "¡olé!", "¡eso!" to encourage flamenco dancers during a performance, or a style of dancing. Billboard describes the song as an "uptempo track with Middle Eastern and flamenco inflections".

== Music video ==
A music video, directed by Kacho López and Carlos Pérez, aired in May 2003.

== Chart performance ==
"Jaleo" peaked at number one on the US Hot Latin Songs for one week and in Spain for four weeks. It was a top-forty hit around the world.

== Awards ==
"Jaleo" (Roger Sanchez Remix) was nominated at the 2004 Latin Billboard Music Awards as the Latin Dance Club Play Track of the Year.

== Formats and track listings ==
Canadian CD single / European mini CD single

1. "Jaleo" (Spanglish Version) – 3:41
2. "Jaleo" (Spanish Version) – 3:41

European CD single

1. "Jaleo" (Spanglish Version) – 3:41
2. "Jaleo" (Spanish Version) – 3:41
3. "Jaleo" (Pablo Flores Spanglish Radio Edit Remix) – 4:13

Australian/European CD maxi-single

1. "Jaleo" (Spanglish Version) – 3:41
2. "Jaleo" (Spanish Version) – 3:41
3. "Jaleo" (Pablo Flores Spanglish Radio Edit Remix) – 4:13
4. "Jaleo" (Roger Sanchez Spanglish Radio Edit Remix) – 3:08

European 12" single

1. "Jaleo" (Spanglish Version) – 3:41
2. "Jaleo" (Roger Sanchez Casa de Gitano Mix) (Spanglish) – 8:08
3. "Jaleo" (Jam Factory Oriental Remix) (Spanglish Extended Mix) – 4:47
4. "Jaleo" (Pablo Flores PF Dub) – 7:43

UK 12" promotional single

1. "Jaleo" (Roger Sanchez Casa de Gitano Mix) (Spanglish) – 8:08
2. "Jaleo" (Miracle Workz Remix) (Spanglish) – 4:19
3. "Jaleo" (Pablo Flores Spanish Club) – 8:22
4. "Jaleo" (Jam Factory Oriental Remix) (Spanish Extended Mix) – 4:47

US 12" promotional single

1. "Jaleo" (Roger Sanchez Casa de Gitano Mix) (Spanglish) – 8:08
2. "Jaleo" (Roger Sanchez Trizalismo Dub) (Spanglish) – 7:13

== Charts ==
=== Weekly charts ===
Chart (2003)	Peak position
Australia (ARIA)	23
Austria (Ö3 Austria Top 40)	45
Belgium (Ultratop 50 Flanders)	30
Belgium (Ultratop 50 Wallonia)	44
Canada (Canadian Singles Chart)	19
Denmark (Tracklisten)	17
Europe (European Hot 100 Singles)	30
Finland (Finnish Top 50 Hits)	5
Finland (Finnish Airplay Chart)	4
France (SNEP)	32
Germany (GfK)	45
Hungary (Rádiós Top 40)	36
Italy (FIMI)	8
Netherlands (Dutch Top 40)	26
Netherlands (Single Top 100)	14
Norway (VG-lista)	11
Poland (National Airplay Chart)	20
Romania (Romanian Top 100)	1
Spain (Promusicae)	1
Sweden (Sverigetopplistan)	10
Switzerland (Schweizer Hitparade)	22
US Bubbling Under Hot 100 (Billboard)	22
US Dance Club Songs (Billboard)	13
US Hot Latin Songs (Billboard)	1
US Tropical Airplay (Billboard)	2

=== Year-end charts ===
Chart (2003)	Position
Italy (FIMI)	39
Romania (Romanian Top 100)	10
Spain Airplay (AFYVE)	4
Sweden (Hitlistan)	96
Switzerland (Schweizer Hitparade)	99

== Release history ==
Release dates and formats for Jaleo
Region	Date	Format(s)	Label(s)	Ref.
Taiwan	May 9, 2003	CD single	Columbia	

== See also ==
- List of number-one Billboard Hot Latin Tracks of 2003
- List of number-one singles of 2003 (Spain)
- List of Romanian Top 100 number ones of the 2000s
