= Elsa Lunghini discography =

- Studio albums: 6
- Live albums: 1
- Compilation albums: 1
- Singles: 26
- Video albums: 3
- Box sets: 1

This is the discography of French singer Elsa Lunghini.

== Albums ==
=== Studio albums ===
Title	Album details	Peak chart positions				Certifications
Title	Album details	FRA	BEL (WA)	EUR	QUE	Certifications
Elsa	Released: November 1988; Label: Ariola; Formats: CD, LP, MC	6	—	38	19	FRA: 2× Platinum
Rien que pour ça	Released: 3 September 1990; Label: Ariola; Formats: CD, LP, MC	3	—	35	—	FRA: 2× Gold
Douce violence	Released: 16 September 1992; Label: Ariola; Formats: CD, LP, MC	5	—	39	—	FRA: Gold
Chaque jour est un long chemin	Released: 7 October 1996; Label: Ariola; Formats: CD, MC; An English-language version was released only in Taiwan	28	42	—	—	
De lave et de sève	Released: 27 April 2004; Label: Mercury; Formats: CD	25	43	—	—	
Elsa Lunghini	Released: 8 September 2008; Label: Mercury; Formats: CD	25	53	—	—	
"—" denotes releases that did not chart or were not released in that territory.

=== Live albums ===
Title	Album details	Peak chart positions
Title	Album details	FRA
Connexion live	Released: 10 April 2006; Label: Mercury; Formats: CD	54

=== Compilation albums ===
Title	Album details	Peak chart positions		Certifications
Title	Album details	FRA	BEL (WA)	Certifications
Elsa, l'essentiel 1986–1993	Released: 21 March 1997; Label: EMI; Formats: CD, MC	5 (Note: Peak position on the Compilations Chart.)	25	FRA: Gold

=== Box sets ===
Title	Album details
Premier album / Deuxième album / Troisième album	Released: 1998; Label: EMI; Formats: 3xCD

=== Video albums ===
Title	Album details
Premier Olympia / Tournée 90/91	Released: July 1991; Label: BMG; Formats: VHS
Connexion live	Released: 10 April 2006; Label: Mercury; Formats: DVD
Elsa sous la niege	Released: 2018; Label: LCJ Éditions & Productions; Formats: DVD

== Singles ==
Title	Year	Peak chart positions				Certifications	Album
Title	Year	FRA	EUR	NL	QUE	Certifications	Album
"T'en va pas"	1986	1	17	41	8	FRA: Gold	La Femme de ma vie soundtrack
"Papa Please Don't Go"	1987	—	—	—	—		Non-album single
"Quelque chose dans mon cœur"	1987	2	7	—	30	FRA: Gold	Elsa
"Un roman d'amitié (Friend You Give Me a Reason)" (with Glenn Medeiros)	1988	1	5	—	9	FRA: Gold	Elsa
"Jour de neige"	1988	2	9	—	13	FRA: Gold	Elsa
"À la même heure dans deux ans"	1989	7	29	—	26		Elsa
"Jamais nous"	1989	10	41	—	15		Elsa
"Mon cadeau" (Canada-only release)	1990	—	—	—	—		Elsa
"Solo era un sueño" (Note: "Solo era un sueño" is a Spanish-language version of "Jour de neige".) (Spain-only release)	1990	—	—	—	—		Elsa
"Gli anni miei" (Note: "Gli anni miei" is an Italian-language version of "Jour de neige".) (Italy-only release)	1990	—	—	—	—		Elsa
"Rien que pour ça"	1990	12	57	—	—		Rien que pour ça
"Pleure doucement"	1991	25	—	—	41		Rien que pour ça
"Qu'est-ce que ça peut lui faire"	1991	—	—	—	—		Rien que pour ça
"Je s'rai là" (Canada-only release)	1991	—	—	—	25		Rien que pour ça
"Bouscule-moi"	1992	14	71	—	—		Douce violence
"Supplice chinois (Toop Toop)"	1993	—	—	—	—		Douce violence
"Tout l'temps, tout l'temps"	1993	—	—	—	—		Douce violence
"Chaque jour est un long chemin"	1996	—	—	—	—		Chaque jour est un long chemin
"Sous ma robe"	1997	—	—	—	—		Chaque jour est un long chemin
"Le temps tourne à l'orage" (promo-only release)	1997	—	—	—	—		Chaque jour est un long chemin
"Mon amour" (promo-only release)	2004	—	—	—	—		De lave et de sève
"À quoi ça sert" (promo-only release)	2004	—	—	—	—		De lave et de sève
"Éternité" (promo-only release)	2005	—	—	—	—		Non-album single
"Oser"	2008	—	—	—	—		Elsa Lunghini
"Le garçon d'étage"	2008	—	—	—	—		Elsa Lunghini
"Les tremblements de terre" (with Da Silva; promo-only release)	2009	—	—	—	—		Elsa Lunghini
"—" denotes releases that did not chart or were not released in that territory.
