= Elsa, l'essentiel 1986–1993 =

Greatest hits album by Elsa Lunghini
- Released: 1997
- Recorded: 1986–1992; Titania Studios, Rome; Artistic Palace Studio, Boulogne-Billancourt; Master Rock Studios, London
- Genre: Pop
- Label: EMI
- Producers: Vincent-Marie Bouvot, Raymond Donnez, Gus Dudgeon, Georges Lunghini, Romano Musumarra

Elsa Lunghini chronology
Douce violence (1992)	Elsa, l'essentiel 1986–1993 (1997)	De Lave et de Sève (2004)

Elsa, l'essentiel 1986–1993 is a compilation album by French singer Elsa Lunghini. It was released in 1997.

== Background and chart success ==
The album contains songs from Elsa's first three albums : Elsa, Rien que pour ça and Douce violence. It contains all the songs released as singles, plus several titles that feature on the three studio albums and four cover versions in other languages of three of her hits from Elsa ("T'en va pas", "Jour de neige" and "Jamais nous").

The album met moderate success in Belgium where it was charted for ten weeks, from May 10 to July 19, 1997, peaking at #25 in its fourth week, but it was more successful in France, reaching #5 on the compilations chart and achieving Gold status.

== Track listing ==
#	Title	Length
1.	"T'en va pas" (Catherine Cohen - Régis Wargnier / Romano Musumarra)	5:25
2.	"Quelque chose dans mon cœur" (remix) (Pierre Grosz / Vincent-Marie Bouvot - Georges Lunghini)	3:30
3.	"Un Roman d'amitié (Friend You Give Me a Reason)" (Duet with Glenn Medeiros) (Diane Warren / Robbie Buchanan) French adaptation: Didier Barbelivien	4:20
4.	"Jour de neige" (Pierre Grosz / Vincent-Marie Bouvot - Georges Lunghini)	4:00
5.	"Jamais nous" (remix) (Didier Barbelivien / Vincent-Marie Bouvot - Georges Lunghini)	3:50
6.	"À la même heure dans deux ans" (Pierre Grosz / Raymond Donnez - Georges Lunghini)	3:30
7.	"Mon Cadeau" (Didier Barbelivien / Vincent-Marie Bouvot - Georges Lunghini)	3:50
8.	"Pleure doucement" (Thierry Séchan / Vincent-Marie Bouvot - Georges Lunghini)	3:59
9.	"Qu'est-ce que ça peut lui faire ?" (Gérard Presgurvic / Vincent-Marie Bouvot - Georges Lunghini)	3:20
10.	"Rien que pour ça..." (Gérard Presgurvic / Elsa)	2:45
11.	"Supplice chinois" (Jacques Duvall / Georges Lunghini)	4:14
12.	"Être ensemble" (Jean-Loup Dabadie / Georges Lunghini)	3:50
13.	"Bouscule-moi" (Jacques Duvall / Raymond Donnez - Georges Lunghini)	3:30
14.	"Tout l'temps, tout l'temps" (Jean-Loup Dabadie / Raymond Donnez - Georges Lunghini)	2:45
15.	"Papa Please Don't Go" (English version of "T'en va pas") (Catherine Cohen - Régis Wargnier / Romano Musumarra); English adaptation: Carol Welsman	3:59
16.	"Gli anni miei" (Italian version of "Jour de neige") (Pierre Grosz / Vincent-Marie Bouvot - Georges Lunghini); Italian adaptation: Paolo Cassella	3:58
17.	"Sólo era un sueño" (Spanish version of "Jour de neige") (Pierre Grosz / Vincent-Marie Bouvot - Georges Lunghini); Spanish adaptation: Cristina Rosenvinge	4:02
18.	"Dos bichos raros" (Spanish version of "Jamais nous") (Didier Barbelivien / Vincent-Marie Bouvot - Georges Lunghini); Spanish adaptation: Cristina Rosenvinge	3:54

== Charts ==
Chart (1997)	Peak position
Belgian (Wallonia) Albums Chart	25
French Compilations Chart	3

== Certifications and sales ==
Region	Certification	Certified units/sales
France (SNEP)	Gold	100,000^{*}
^{*} Sales figures based on certification alone.
