= 1988 in music =

This is a list of notable events in music that took place in the year 1988.

== Specific locations ==
- 1988 in British music
- 1988 in Japanese music
- 1988 in Norwegian music
- 1988 in Scandinavian music

== Specific genres ==
- 1988 in country music
- 1988 in heavy metal music
- 1988 in hip-hop
- 1988 in jazz
- 1988 in progressive rock

== Events ==
=== January–March ===
- January 20 – The Rock and Roll Hall of Fame ceremony inducts The Beach Boys, The Beatles, The Drifters, Bob Dylan and The Supremes.
- January 28 – A Tampa, Florida, man files an unusual lawsuit against Mötley Crüe. Matthew John Trippe, who has a history of mental health issues and trouble with the law, claims that he was secretly hired to pose as Nikki Sixx and toured, wrote and recorded with the band for a time during 1983 and 1984. Trippe drops the lawsuit in 1993.
- March 2 – The 30th Annual Grammy Awards are presented in New York, hosted by Billy Crystal. U2's The Joshua Tree wins Album of the Year, Paul Simon's "Graceland" wins Record of the Year and Linda Ronstadt & James Ingram's "Somewhere Out There" wins Song of the Year. Jody Watley wins Best New Artist.
- March 10 - Pop star Andy Gibb dies at a hospital in Oxford, England five days after his 30th birthday.
- March 26 – "Man in the Mirror" by Michael Jackson from the Bad album tops the Billboard Hot 100. It's the first time in history a solo artist has had four Number One singles from the same album.

=== April–June ===
- April 7 – Alice Cooper almost dies on stage when one of the props, the Gallows, malfunctions.
- April 19 – Former rock and roll singer Sonny Bono is inaugurated as the Mayor of Palm Springs, California, USA.
- April 25 – Rock supermanager Doc McGhee is sentenced to five years probation after pleading guilty to charges of drug smuggling stemming from a 1982 seizure of nearly 40,000 pounds of marijuana entering North Carolina from Colombia.
- April 30 – The Eurovision Song Contest, held in the RDS Simmonscourt Pavilion, Dublin, is won by French-Canadian singer Celine Dion, representing Switzerland with the song "Ne partez pas sans moi".
- May 14 – Atlantic Records stages a concert at Madison Square Garden celebrating its Fortieth birthday with performances by many of the label's greatest acts of the past. Artists include Crosby, Stills & Nash, Iron Butterfly, Ruth Brown, Foreigner and Wilson Pickett, but the most talked-about performance is by a reunited Led Zeppelin with Jason Bonham on drums.
- May 27 – The Monsters of Rock Tour 1988 commences in East Troy, Wisconsin. Van Halen headlines with the other acts on the bill consisting of Metallica, Scorpions, Dokken and Kingdom Come.
- June 10 – Singing Revolution begins in Estonia.
- June 18 – Depeche Mode play to a crowd of 60,000 at the Rose Bowl in Pasadena, California. The concert was filmed and recorded by D. A. Pennebaker for the group's documentary-concert film and live album 101.
- June 27 – Motown Records is sold to MCA and an investment firm for $61 million.

=== July–September ===
- July 2 – Michael Jackson with fifth single from Bad, "Dirty Diana", he broke the record to have five consecutive charting singles from same album at the top of the Billboard Hot 100, is the first artist and only male in history to achieve this.
- August 12 – Public Enemy garners publicity by staging a concert at Riker's Island prison for 250 inmates and 100 journalists.
- September 6–9 – Elton John auctions off many items from his personal collection, including memorabilia and stage-worn clothing, at Sotheby's for a total of $8.5 million. John had been known for wearing flamboyant stage costumes during the glam rock era of the 1970s, but he increasingly abandoned them in later years.
- September 10 – Billboard magazine publishes its Hot Modern Rock Tracks chart for the first time.
- September 24 – James Brown faces a variety of charges after leading police on an interstate chase, after reportedly breaking into a seminar in an Augusta, Georgia, building he owned an office in, waving a gun and demanding to know who had used his restrooms. Earlier in the year Brown had been arrested on drug and firearms-related charges.
- September 25 – The Aalto Theatre, Essen, Germany, opens with a performance of Die Meistersinger von Nürnberg.

=== October–December ===
- October 10 – The new Cairo Opera House is inaugurated by President Hosni Mubarak and Prince Tomohito of Mikasa, brother of the Emperor of Japan. The opening ceremony includes a kabuki performance in recognition of the funds donated by Japan.
- November 7 – John Fogerty wins a self-plagiarism lawsuit with Fantasy Records. The record label had contended that Fogerty's 1985 comeback hit "The Old Man Down the Road" was too similar to his 1970 Creedence Clearwater Revival song, "Run Through the Jungle".
- November 12 – U2's Rattle and Hum hits the Number One spot on the U.S. charts, the first double album to do so since Bruce Springsteen's The River in 1980.
- November 19 – The 17th OTI Festival, held at the Teatro Nacional Cervantes in Buenos Aires, Argentina, is won by the song "Todavía eres mi mujer", written by Carlos Castellón, and performed by Guillermo Guido representing Argentina.
- December 4 – Singer Roy Orbison gives his last concert in Akron, Ohio, USA, before his death from a heart attack.
- December 28 – Madonna calls sheriff's officers to the Malibu, California home she shared with her soon-to-be ex-husband Sean Penn.
- December 31 – The 17th annual New Year's Rockin' Eve special airs on ABC, with appearances by Natalie Cole, Taylor Dayne, DJ Jazzy Jeff & the Fresh Prince, Richard Marx, Reba McEntire and Frankie Valli and The Four Seasons.

=== Also in 1988 ===
- Peter Ruzicka becomes director of the Hamburg State Opera and State Philharmonic Orchestra.
- Andrew Davis begins a term as chief conductor of the BBC Symphony Orchestra, and is appointed musical director of Glyndebourne Festival Opera, effective with the 1989 season.
- "I Heard It Through the Grapevine" experiences a surge in popularity in the USA sparked by television commercials featuring claymation raisin figures dancing to the song. The California Raisins version of the song peaks at number 84 on the Billboard Hot 100.

== Bands formed ==
- See Musical groups established in 1988

== Bands disbanded ==
See Musical groups disestablished in 1988

== Albums released ==
=== January–March ===
Date		Album	Artist	Notes
J A N U A R Y	4	B'Sides Themselves	Marillion	B-sides compilation
J A N U A R Y	4	L.A. Guns	L.A. Guns	Debut
J A N U A R Y	11	Live: The Road	The Kinks	Live
J A N U A R Y	18	If I Should Fall from Grace with God	The Pogues	-
J A N U A R Y	18	Prison Bound	Social Distortion	-
J A N U A R Y	19	So Far, So Good... So What!	Megadeth	-
J A N U A R Y	19	Tell It to My Heart	Taylor Dayne	-
J A N U A R Y	21	Skyscraper	David Lee Roth	-
J A N U A R Y	?	Never Die Young	James Taylor	-
J A N U A R Y	?	Newbuild	808 State	-
J A N U A R Y	?	State of Mind	Front Line Assembly	-
F E B R U A R Y	1	Blow Up Your Video	AC/DC	-
F E B R U A R Y	2	Ain't Misbehavin'	UFO	mini-album
F E B R U A R Y	2	I'm Your Man	Leonard Cohen	-
F E B R U A R Y	2	Lita	Lita Ford	-
F E B R U A R Y	2	Live+1	Frehley's Comet	Live EP +1 studio track
F E B R U A R Y	4	Space Wrangler	Widespread Panic	Debut
F E B R U A R Y	8	The Seventh One	Toto	-
F E B R U A R Y	8	Who Killed The JAMs?	The Justified Ancients of Mu Mu	-
F E B R U A R Y	12	Don't Blow Your Top	KMFDM	-
F E B R U A R Y	16	All About Eve	All About Eve	-
F E B R U A R Y	16	Nada como el sol	Sting	EP
F E B R U A R Y	16	Starfish	The Church	-
F E B R U A R Y	16	Tattooed Beat Messiah	Zodiac Mindwarp and the Love Reaction	-
F E B R U A R Y	16	Underneath the Radar	Underworld	Debut
F E B R U A R Y	17	Making Trouble	Geto Boys	-
F E B R U A R Y	23	Goin' Off	Biz Markie	-
F E B R U A R Y	29	Now and Zen	Robert Plant	-
F E B R U A R Y	29	Children	The Mission	-
F E B R U A R Y	29	The Frenz Experiment	The Fall	-
F E B R U A R Y	29	Idlewild	Everything but the Girl	-
F E B R U A R Y	29	Kingdom Come	Kingdom Come	Debut
F E B R U A R Y	29	The Best of OMD	Orchestral Manoeuvres in the Dark	Compilation
F E B R U A R Y	?	Corrosion	Front Line Assembly	-
F E B R U A R Y	?	Falling Up	Kevin Ayers	-
F E B R U A R Y	?	Hard Machine	Stacey Q	-
F E B R U A R Y	?	If You Can't Lick 'Em...Lick 'Em	Ted Nugent	-
F E B R U A R Y	?	Pinker and Prouder Than Previous	Nick Lowe	-
M A R C H	1	The Whitey Album	Ciccone Youth	-
M A R C H	7	A Fierce Pancake	Stump	-
M A R C H	7	Past Masters	The Beatles	Compilation
M A R C H	7	Tear Down These Walls	Billy Ocean	-
M A R C H	8	Racing After Midnight	Honeymoon Suite	-
M A R C H	14	From Langley Park to Memphis	Prefab Sprout	-
M A R C H	14	Viva Hate	Morrissey	UK
M A R C H	15	Naked	Talking Heads	-
M A R C H	21	Now That's What I Call Music 11 (UK series)	Various Artists	Compilation
M A R C H	21	Surfer Rosa	Pixies	UK
M A R C H	22	Green Thoughts	The Smithereens	-
M A R C H	23	Chalk Mark in a Rain Storm	Joni Mitchell	-
M A R C H	23	No Exit	Fates Warning	-
M A R C H	24	Chase the Kangaroo	The Choir	-
M A R C H	25	Heart Attack	Krokus	-
M A R C H	25	The World's Greatest Entertainer	Doug E. Fresh	-
M A R C H	28	Wings of Heaven	Magnum	-
M A R C H	28	On Target	Fastway	-
M A R C H	28	Out of the Silent Planet	King's X	-
M A R C H	28	Push	Bros	Debut
M A R C H	28	The Tenement Year	Pere Ubu	-
M A R C H	29	Lefty	Art Garfunkel	-
M A R C H	?	Destiny	Saxon	-
M A R C H	?	House Tornado	Throwing Muses	-
M A R C H	?	Love Hysteria	Peter Murphy	-
M A R C H	?	Lovely	The Primitives	Debut
M A R C H	?	The Pictorial Jackson Review	Felt	-
M A R C H	?	What Up, Dog?	Was (Not Was)	-
M A R C H	?	Xenophobia (Why?)	Spy vs. Spy	-

=== April–June ===
Date		Album	Artist	Notes
A P R I L	5	Conscious Party	Ziggy Marley & The Melody Makers	-
A P R I L	5	Tracy Chapman	Tracy Chapman	-
A P R I L	5	He's the DJ, I'm the Rapper	DJ Jazzy Jeff & the Fresh Prince	-
A P R I L	8	Odyssey	Yngwie Malmsteen	-
A P R I L	11	Hairway to Steven	Butthole Surfers	-
A P R I L	11	Seventh Son of a Seventh Son	Iron Maiden	-
A P R I L	11	This Note's for You	Neil Young and the Bluenotes	-
A P R I L	12	Colors	Various Artists	Soundtrack
A P R I L	12	Even Worse	"Weird Al" Yankovic	-
A P R I L	12	Lap of Luxury	Cheap Trick	-
A P R I L	13	Diamond Sun	Glass Tiger	-
A P R I L	13	Aliens Ate My Buick	Thomas Dolby	-
A P R I L	13	Shove It	The Cross	Debut
A P R I L	14	Vanishing Vision	X Japan	Debut; then known as X
A P R I L	18	Barbed Wire Kisses	The Jesus and Mary Chain	Compilation
A P R I L	18	Crossroads	Eric Clapton	Box Set
A P R I L	18	Savage Amusement	Scorpions	-
A P R I L	18	Eden Alley	Timbuk3	-
A P R I L	18	The Innocents	Erasure	-
A P R I L	18	Reba	Reba McEntire	-
A P R I L	20	History of a Time to Come	Sabbat	-
A P R I L	25	Hang Time	Soul Asylum	-
A P R I L	25	Life's Too Good	The Sugarcubes	-
A P R I L	25	The Madness	The Madness	-
A P R I L	25	The Xenon Codex	Hawkwind	-
A P R I L	26	Guitar	Frank Zappa	Live
A P R I L	26	Refuge Denied	Sanctuary	Debut
A P R I L	27	Flirt	Evelyn King	-
A P R I L	?	Live 1980/86	Joe Jackson	Live
A P R I L	?	Ainsi soit je...	Mylène Farmer	-
A P R I L	?	Fur	Jane Wiedlin	-
A P R I L	?	Heart of Gold	Sofia Rotaru	-
A P R I L	?	The Mona Lisa's Sister	Graham Parker	-
M A Y	1	The First of a Million Kisses	Fairground Attraction	-
M A Y	1	Rehab Doll	Green River	-
M A Y	2	Melissa Etheridge	Melissa Etheridge	Debut
M A Y	3	Stronger Than Pride	Sade	-
M A Y	3	In Effect Mode	Al B. Sure!	-
M A Y	3	The Madness	The Madness	-
M A Y	3	Operation: Mindcrime	Queensrÿche	-
M A Y	3	Scenes from the Southside	Bruce Hornsby and the Range	-
M A Y	3	Stay on These Roads	a-ha	-
M A Y	3	Vivid	Living Colour	-
M A Y		When in Rome	When in Rome	-
M A Y	5	The New Order	Testament	-
M A Y	9	Open Up and Say... Ahh!	Poison	-
M A Y	9	Hide Your Heart	Bonnie Tyler	-
M A Y	9	North and South	Gerry Rafferty	-
M A Y	10	Joy	Teddy Pendergrass	-
M A Y	10	Lovesexy	Prince	-
M A Y	12	Invisible Lantern	Screaming Trees	-
M A Y	13	Ram It Down	Judas Priest	-
M A Y	16	The House of Love	The House of Love	Debut
M A Y	16	Tougher Than Leather	Run-D.M.C.	-
M A Y	16	You Can't Do That on Stage Anymore, Vol. 1	Frank Zappa	Live
M A Y	17	Battalions of Fear	Blind Guardian	Debut
M A Y	17	In the City of Angels	Jon Anderson	-
M A Y	23	OU812	Van Halen	-
M A Y	23	Out of Order	Rod Stewart	-
M A Y	23	Up Your Alley	Joan Jett and the Blackhearts	-
M A Y	24	Our Beloved Revolutionary Sweetheart	Camper Van Beethoven	-
M A Y	24	Total Devo	Devo	-
M A Y	24	Second Sighting	Frehley's Comet	-
M A Y	30	Down in the Groove	Bob Dylan	-
M A Y	31	By All Means Necessary	Boogie Down Productions	-
M A Y	?	The Abbey Road E.P.	Red Hot Chili Peppers	EP
M A Y	?	A Bell Is a Cup	Wire	-
M A Y	?	Perfect Machine	Herbie Hancock	-
J U N E	4	Volunteer	Sham 69	-
J U N E	5	People	Hothouse Flowers	Debut
J U N E	6	Britny Fox	Britny Fox	Debut
J U N E	6	Provision	Scritti Politti	-
J U N E	7	Strictly Business	EPMD	Debut
J U N E	7	What More Can I Say?	Audio Two	-
J U N E	10	Small World	Huey Lewis and the News	-
J U N E	13	Close	Kim Wilde	-
J U N E	13	Ain't Complaining	Status Quo	-
J U N E	13	Conscience	Womack and Womack	-
J U N E	13	Sur la Mer	The Moody Blues	-
J U N E	13	Guy	Guy	-
J U N E	13	Survive	Nuclear Assault	-
J U N E	20	Nobody's Perfect	Deep Purple	Live
J U N E	20	Outrider	Jimmy Page	-
J U N E	20	Chicago 19	Chicago	-
J U N E	20	Roll with It	Steve Winwood	-
J U N E	20	Reg Strikes Back	Elton John	-
J U N E	20	Confessions of a Pop Group	The Style Council	-
J U N E	20	Don't Be Cruel	Bobby Brown	-
J U N E	20	Let It Bee	Voice of the Beehive	-
J U N E	20	Heart Break	New Edition	-
J U N E	20	Instinct	Iggy Pop	-
J U N E	21	Forever Your Girl	Paula Abdul	-
J U N E	21	Information Society	Information Society	-
J U N E	21	In Full Gear	Stetsasonic	-
J U N E	21	Long Live the Kane	Big Daddy Kane	-
J U N E	21	Lullaby	Book of Love	-
J U N E	24	Fearless	Eighth Wonder	-
J U N E	24	Power Metal	Pantera	-
J U N E	27	Heavy Nova	Robert Palmer	-
J U N E	27	20 Years of Jethro Tull	Jethro Tull	Box Set
J U N E	27	Eternal Nightmare	Vio-lence	Debut
J U N E	27	Outside the Gate	Killing Joke	-
J U N E	27	Riders Radio Theater	Riders in the Sky	-
J U N E	28	In God We Trust	Stryper	-
J U N E	28	It Takes a Nation of Millions to Hold Us Back	Public Enemy	-
J U N E	28	Lead Me On	Amy Grant	-
J U N E	29	Dimension Hatröss	Voivod	-
J U N E	30	Indispensable: The Best of Michael Franks	Michael Franks	Compilation
J U N E	?	Blind	The Icicle Works	-
J U N E	?	Coming Back Hard Again	The Fat Boys	-
J U N E	?	Dream of Life	Patti Smith	-
J U N E	?	Tighten Up Vol. 88	Big Audio Dynamite	-
J U N E	?	Y Kant Tori Read	Y Kant Tori Read	featuring Tori Amos

=== July–September ===
Date		Album	Artist	Notes
J U L Y	4	Kylie	Kylie Minogue	-
J U L Y	4	Wide Awake in Dreamland	Pat Benatar	-
J U L Y	5	South of Heaven	Slayer	-
J U L Y	5	Temple of Low Men	Crowded House	-
J U L Y	5	Long Cold Winter	Cinderella	-
J U L Y	11	Substance	Joy Division	Compilation
J U L Y	11	UB40	UB40	-
J U L Y	11	Wild Wild West	The Escape Club	-
J U L Y	12	Brian Wilson	Brian Wilson	-
J U L Y	23	Now That's What I Call Music 12 (UK series)	Various Artists	Compilation
J U L Y	25	View from the House	Kim Carnes	-
J U L Y	26	A Salt with a Deadly Pepa	Salt-N-Pepa	-
J U L Y	28	Reek of Putrefaction	Carcass	-
J U L Y	?	Imaginos	Blue Öyster Cult	-
J U L Y	?	The Best of Thompson Twins: Greatest Mixes	Thompson Twins	Remixes
J U L Y	?	Cocktail	Various Artists	Soundtrack
J U L Y	?	Train Above the City	Felt	-
A U G U S T	1	Winger	Winger	Debut
A U G U S T	1	Chimes of Freedom	Bruce Springsteen	Live EP
A U G U S T	1	Punishment for Decadence	Coroner	-
A U G U S T	1	Red Rose for Gregory	Gregory Isaacs	-
A U G U S T	1	So Good	Mica Paris	-
A U G U S T	2	Back to Avalon	Kenny Loggins	-
A U G U S T	2	Buenas Noches from a Lonely Room	Dwight Yoakam	-
A U G U S T	2	Greatest Hits Live	Carly Simon	Live
A U G U S T	2	Let It Roll	Little Feat	-
A U G U S T	2	The Rumour	Olivia Newton-John	-
A U G U S T	2	Winds of Heaven, Stuff of Earth	Rich Mullins	-
A U G U S T	4	Follow the Leader	Eric B & Rakim	-
A U G U S T	5	Simple Pleasures	Bobby McFerrin	-
A U G U S T	8	Don't Be Afraid of the Dark	Robert Cray	-
A U G U S T	8	Dragon's Kiss	Marty Friedman	Debut
A U G U S T	8	Strong Enough to Bend	Tanya Tucker	-
A U G U S T	8	What Good Is Grief to a God?	D.I.	-
A U G U S T	9	The Indescribable Wow	Sam Phillips	-
A U G U S T	9	It Takes Two	Rob Base and DJ E-Z Rock	Debut
A U G U S T	9	Out Of This World	Europe	-
A U G U S T	12	Hangin' Tough	New Kids on the Block	-
A U G U S T	12	Leprosy	Death	-
A U G U S T	13	Colin James	Colin James	Debut
A U G U S T	15	Dangerous Age	Bad Company	-
A U G U S T	15	Homesick Heroes	Charlie Daniels	-
A U G U S T	15	Short Sharp Shocked	Michelle Shocked	-
A U G U S T	15	Soul Searchin'	Glenn Frey	-
A U G U S T	23	Nothing's Shocking	Jane's Addiction	-
A U G U S T	23	Two Nuns and a Pack Mule	Rapeman	-
A U G U S T	24	Young Man Running	Corey Hart	-
A U G U S T	26	Interior Design	Sparks	-
A U G U S T	29	Keeper of the Seven Keys: Part II	Helloween	-
A U G U S T	30	1988 Summer Olympics Album: One Moment in Time	Various Artists	-
A U G U S T	30	Chameleon Days	Yanni	-
A U G U S T	30	Danzig	Danzig	-
A U G U S T	30	Other Roads	Boz Scaggs	-
A U G U S T	30	Slow Turning	John Hiatt	-
A U G U S T	30	Vixen	Vixen	-
A U G U S T	?	16 Lovers Lane	The Go-Betweens	-
A U G U S T	?	Interior Design	Sparks	-
A U G U S T	?	Perpetual Burn	Jason Becker	Debut
A U G U S T	?	Viva Santana!	Santana	Compilation with unreleased tracks
A U G U S T	?	Tucker	Joe Jackson	Soundtrack
S E P T E M B E R	1	Cold Lake	Celtic Frost	-
S E P T E M B E R	1	I 2 (EYE)	Michael W. Smith	-
S E P T E M B E R	5	Rank	The Smiths	Live
S E P T E M B E R	5	Peepshow	Siouxsie and the Banshees	-
S E P T E M B E R	6	...And Justice for All	Metallica	-
S E P T E M B E R	8	Suffer	Bad Religion	-
S E P T E M B E R	12	Spirit of Eden	Talk Talk	-
S E P T E M B E R	12	Ancient Heart	Tanita Tikaram	-
S E P T E M B E R	12	Sunshine on Leith	The Proclaimers	-
S E P T E M B E R	12	VIVIsectVI	Skinny Puppy	-
S E P T E M B E R	13	Eazy-Duz-It	Eazy-E	-
S E P T E M B E R	13	How Will I Laugh Tomorrow When I Can't Even Smile Today	Suicidal Tendencies	-
S E P T E M B E R	13	Power	Ice-T	-
S E P T E M B E R	13	See the Light	Jeff Healey Band	-
S E P T E M B E R	13	Them	King Diamond	US
S E P T E M B E R	13	Truth and Soul	Fishbone	-
S E P T E M B E R	16	From Enslavement to Obliteration	Napalm Death	-
S E P T E M B E R	19	Watermark	Enya	-
S E P T E M B E R	19	Staring at the Sun	Level 42	UK
S E P T E M B E R	19	Buster	Phil Collins et al.	Soundtrack
S E P T E M B E R	19	State of Euphoria	Anthrax	-
S E P T E M B E R	19	Blow My Fuse	Kix	-
S E P T E M B E R	19	Blue Bell Knoll	Cocteau Twins	-
S E P T E M B E R	19	New Jersey	Bon Jovi	-
S E P T E M B E R	19	Tender Prey	Nick Cave and the Bad Seeds	-
S E P T E M B E R	20	Any Love	Luther Vandross	-
S E P T E M B E R	20	BulletBoys	BulletBoys	-
S E P T E M B E R	20	In Control, Volume 1	Marley Marl	Debut
S E P T E M B E R	20	Land of Dreams	Randy Newman	-
S E P T E M B E R	20	Workers Playtime	Billy Bragg	-
S E P T E M B E R	21	B'z	B'z	Debut
S E P T E M B E R	21	Pound for Pound	Anvil	-
S E P T E M B E R	25	Lincoln	They Might Be Giants	-
S E P T E M B E R	26	Revolutions	Jean Michel Jarre	-
S E P T E M B E R	26	Peace in Our Time	Big Country	-
S E P T E M B E R	26	Metal Rhythm	Gary Numan	-
S E P T E M B E R	26	Strip-mine	James	-
S E P T E M B E R	26	Boingo Alive	Oingo Boingo	Compilation + Live
S E P T E M B E R	28	Let's Get It Started	MC Hammer	Capitol re-release of 1987 debut
S E P T E M B E R	?	Big Time	Tom Waits	Live
S E P T E M B E R	?	Born 2 B Blue	Steve Miller	-
S E P T E M B E R	?	Godflesh	Godflesh	EP
S E P T E M B E R	?	Hallowed Ground	Skin Yard	-
S E P T E M B E R	?	Hell-O	Gwar	-
S E P T E M B E R	?	In Battle There Is No Law	Bolt Thrower	-
S E P T E M B E R	?	La pistola y el corazón	Los Lobos	-
S E P T E M B E R	?	Thaw	Foetus Interruptus	

=== October–December ===
Date		Album	Artist	Notes
O C T O B E R	1	Breakwater	Lennie Gallant	-
O C T O B E R	3	Nö Sleep at All	Motörhead	Live
O C T O B E R	3	Flying Colours	Chris de Burgh	-
O C T O B E R	3	Talk Is Cheap	Keith Richards	-
O C T O B E R	4	Critical Beatdown	Ultramagnetic MCs	-
O C T O B E R	4	Silhouette	Kenny G	-
O C T O B E R	10	Rattle and Hum	U2	Soundtrack; Studio + Live
O C T O B E R	10	Introspective	Pet Shop Boys	-
O C T O B E R	10	Barcelona	Freddie Mercury and Montserrat Caballé	-
O C T O B E R	10	Imagine: John Lennon	John Lennon et al.	Soundtrack
O C T O B E R	11	The Land of Rape and Honey	Ministry	-
O C T O B E R	11	Touch	Sarah McLachlan	Arista Records re-release
O C T O B E R	14	Money for Nothing	Dire Straits	Compilation
O C T O B E R	14	Broadway the Hard Way	Frank Zappa	Live
O C T O B E R	17	Big Thing	Duran Duran	-
O C T O B E R	17	Blood Fire Death	Bathory	-
O C T O B E R	17	Eponymous	R.E.M.	Compilation
O C T O B E R	17	New Light Through Old Windows	Chris Rea	Remixes
O C T O B E R	17	Fisherman's Blues	The Waterboys	-
O C T O B E R	17	Copperhead Road	Steve Earle	-
O C T O B E R	18	Daydream Nation	Sonic Youth	-
O C T O B E R	18	Everything	The Bangles	-
O C T O B E R	18	Negotiations and Love Songs	Paul Simon	Compilation
O C T O B E R	18	Traveling Wilburys Vol. 1	Traveling Wilburys	US
O C T O B E R	18	Giving You the Best That I Got	Anita Baker	-
O C T O B E R	18	Martika	Martika	Debut
O C T O B E R	21	Look Sharp!	Roxette	Sweden
O C T O B E R	21	QR	Quiet Riot	-
O C T O B E R	24	Living Years	Mike + The Mechanics	US
O C T O B E R	24	Rage	T'Pau	-
O C T O B E R	24	The Serpent's Egg	Dead Can Dance	-
O C T O B E R	24	I Am Kurious Oranj	The Fall	-
O C T O B E R	24	Into a Secret Land	Sandra	-
O C T O B E R	25	In the Spirit of Things	Kansas	-
O C T O B E R	25	Till I Loved You	Barbra Streisand	-
O C T O B E R	25	You Can't Do That on Stage Anymore, Vol. 2	Frank Zappa	Live
O C T O B E R	27	El Ritmo Mundial	Los Fabulosos Cadillacs	-
O C T O B E R	31	Ultramega OK	Soundgarden	Debut
O C T O B E R	31	Choba B CCCP	Paul McCartney	USSR-only release
O C T O B E R	31	Bug	Dinosaur Jr.	-
O C T O B E R	?	No Rest for the Wicked	Ozzy Osbourne	-
O C T O B E R	?	Greatest Hits of All Times – Remix '88	Boney M.	Remix
O C T O B E R	?	Amnesia	Richard Thompson	-
O C T O B E R	?	My Nation Underground	Julian Cope	-
N O V E M B E R	1	American Dream	Crosby, Stills, Nash & Young	-
N O V E M B E R	1	20	Harry Connick Jr.	-
N O V E M B E R	1	Flag	Yello	-
N O V E M B E R	1	The Great Adventures of Slick Rick	Slick Rick	-
N O V E M B E R	1	Oasis	Roberta Flack	-
N O V E M B E R	1	Reach for the Sky	Ratt	-
N O V E M B E R	1	Shaday	Ofra Haza	-
N O V E M B E R	7	Beast from the East	Dokken	Live
N O V E M B E R	7	The Memphis Sessions	Wet Wet Wet	-
N O V E M B E R	8	Green	R.E.M.	-
N O V E M B E R	8	Straight out the Jungle	The Jungle Brothers	-
N O V E M B E R	10	California	American Music Club	-
N O V E M B E R	11	My Gift to You	Alexander O'Neal	-
N O V E M B E R	14	All or Nothing	Milli Vanilli	-
N O V E M B E R	15	Greatest Hits	Journey	Compilation
N O V E M B E R	15	Smashes, Thrashes & Hits	Kiss	Compilation Remixed +2 new tracks
N O V E M B E R	15	Gems	Aerosmith	Compilation
N O V E M B E R	15	The Live Album	Robert Earl Keen	Live
N O V E M B E R	15	The Trinity Session	Cowboy Junkies	-
N O V E M B E R	16	Goodbye Girl	Miyuki Nakajima	-
N O V E M B E R	16	Leprosy	Death	-
N O V E M B E R	18	Kings of Metal	Manowar	-
N O V E M B E R	18	Reel Life	Boy Meets Girl	-
N O V E M B E R	21	Greatest Hits	Fleetwood Mac	Compilation +2 new tracks
N O V E M B E R	21	Delicate Sound of Thunder	Pink Floyd	Live
N O V E M B E R	21	Isn't Anything	My Bloody Valentine	Debut
N O V E M B E R	21	Now That's What I Call Music XIII (UK series)	Various Artists	Compilation
N O V E M B E R	21	The Land Before Time: Original Motion Picture Soundtrack	Various Artists	Soundtrack
N O V E M B E R	21	Bummed	Happy Mondays	-
N O V E M B E R	22	Beaches	Bette Midler	Soundtrack
N O V E M B E R	22	CK	Chaka Khan	-
N O V E M B E R	23	Ancient Dreams	Candlemass	-
N O V E M B E R	25	Hold an Old Friend's Hand	Tiffany	-
N O V E M B E R	28	Hold Me in Your Arms	Rick Astley	UK
N O V E M B E R	29	G N' R Lies	Guns N' Roses	-
N O V E M B E R	?	Front By Front	Front 242	-
N O V E M B E R	?	Mademoiselle chante...	Patricia Kaas	-
D E C E M B E R	6	Almost Acoustic	Jerry Garcia	Live
D E C E M B E R	9	Empnefsi!	Anna Vissi	-
D E C E M B E R	13	The Best Years of Our Lives	Neil Diamond	-
D E C E M B E R	28	Sub Pop 200	Various Artists	-

=== Release date unknown ===
- Arcane – Cindy Blackman
- Atomic Arena – Barren Cross
- Aural Guerrilla – The Ex
- Can't Buy a Miracle – Randy Stonehill
- The Chess Box – Chuck Berry (compilation)
- Don't Forget the Struggle, Don't Forget the Streets – Warzone
- The Dubliner's Dublin – The Dubliners
- English Rebel Songs 1381-1984 – Chumbawamba
- Flowers in the Rain (album) – Mad at the World
- Ghost Stories - The Dream Syndicate
- Go Off! – Cacophony
- Greg Howe – Greg Howe
- Home Is Where the Heart Is – David Grisman
- Honeymoon in Red – Honeymoon in Red
- Human Sacrifice – Vengeance Rising
- I Crush Bozo - Happy Flowers
- In America – Defunkt
- Irène Schweizer & Günter Sommer – Irène Schweizer and Günter Sommer
- I See Good Spirits and I See Bad Spirits – My Life with the Thrill Kill Kult
- I Used to Be an Animal – Eric Burdon
- In Heat – Black 'N Blue
- Irish Heartbeat – Van Morrison & The Chieftains
- King Kobra III – King Kobra
- Let's Go Scare Al – Gear Daddies
- Let's Spin! – The Swirling Eddies
- Little Love Affairs – Nanci Griffith
- Live – Bad Brains
- The Live Brain Wedgie/WAD – Ween
- Live to Die – Bride
- Lucinda Williams – Lucinda Williams
- Mistress Music – Burning Spear
- Nothing Exceeds Like Excess – Raven
- Nothing Wrong – Red Lorry Yellow Lorry
- On Fire! – Petra
- Phil Keaggy and Sunday's Child – Phil Keaggy
- Prostitute – Toyah
- Radio Free Albemuth – Stuart Hamm
- Remote – Hue & Cry
- Rough Night in Jericho – Dreams So Real
- Savvy Show Stoppers – Shadowy Men on a Shadowy Planet
- Shadowland – k.d. lang
- Shake Sugaree - Taj Mahal
- Silence Screams - REZ
- So Good It Hurts – The Mekons
- Soliloquy for Lilith – Nurse With Wound
- Something in Return – Jimmy Lyons and Andrew Cyrille
- Stay Awake: Various Interpretations of Music from Vintage Disney Films – Various Artists
- STP Not LSD – Angry Samoans
- Streets of This Town – Steve Forbert
- Swastikas for Noddy – Current 93
- The Talking Animals – T-Bone Burnett
- Tender Pervert – Momus
- Time Odyssey – Vinnie Moore
- Today – Galaxie 500
- Tommy Page – Tommy Page
- The Winter of '88 – Johnny Winter
- Workin' Band – Nitty Gritty Dirt Band
- Yeah, Whatever – Moev

== Singles released in 1988 ==
Date	Song	Artist
January 16	"Man in the Mirror"	Michael Jackson
February 25	"Where Do Broken Hearts Go"	Whitney Houston
April 16	"Please Don't Go Girl"	New Kids on the Block
April 18	"Dirty Diana"	Michael Jackson
May 16	"Don't Be Cruel"	Bobby Brown
June 10	"Waiting for a Star to Fall"	Boy Meets Girl
June 27	"Girl You Know It's True"	Milli Vanilli
July 11	"Another Part of Me"	Michael Jackson
October 11	"My Prerogative"	Bobby Brown
October 24	"Smooth Criminal"	Michael Jackson
November 7	"You Got It (The Right Stuff)"	New Kids on the Block
December 27	"Roni"	Bobby Brown

== Biggest hit singles ==
The following songs achieved the highest chart positions in the charts of 1988.

#	Artist	Title	Year	Country	Chart Entries
1	Phil Collins	A Groovy Kind of Love	1988	(United Kingdom)	UK 1 - Sep 1988 (15 weeks), US Billboard 1 - Sep 1988 (25 weeks), Holland 1 - Sep 1988 (12 weeks), Switzerland 1 - Oct 1988 (23 weeks), Poland 1 - Sep 1988 (17 weeks), Belgium 1 - Oct 1988 (10 weeks), Eire 1 for 2 weeks - Sep 1988, Canada RPM 1 for 3 weeks - Oct 1988, Australia 1 for 1 week - Nov 1988, Europe 1 for 1 week - Oct 1988, Norway 2 - Sep 1988 (16 weeks), Italy 2 of 1988, Germany 3 - Jan 1989 (5 months), ODK Germany 3 - Sep 1988 (23 weeks) (13 weeks in top 10), Springbok 3 - Jan 1989 (4 weeks), Sweden 4 - Sep 1988 (7 weeks), US Gold (certified by RIAA in Jan 1989), Germany Gold (certified by BMieV in 1989), Austria 6 - Nov 1988 (4 months), Japan (Tokyo) 7 - Nov 1988 (12 weeks), Canada 7 of 1988, South Africa 11 of 1989, US Radio 23 of 1988 (peak 1 8 weeks), Australia 23 of 1988, US BB 29 of 1988, US CashBox 29 of 1988, ARC 41 of 1988 (peak 1 12 weeks), POP 65 of 1988, Brazil 75 of 1989, Germany 103 of the 1980s (peak 3 16 weeks), UKMIX 770, UK Silver (certified by BPI in Sep 1988), RYM 193 of 1988
2	Bobby McFerrin	Don't Worry Be Happy	1988	(United States)	US Billboard 1 - Jul 1988 (26 weeks), Austria 1 - Nov 1988 (4 months), Germany 1 - Jan 1989 (5 months), ODK Germany 1 - Oct 1988 (23 weeks) (10 weeks at number 1) (15 weeks in top 10), Canada RPM 1 for 2 weeks - Oct 1988, Australia 1 for 6 weeks - Nov 1988, Europe 1 for 6 weeks - Nov 1988, Germany 1 for 10 weeks - Nov 1988, Grammy in 1988, UK 2 - Sep 1988 (11 weeks), Holland 2 - Oct 1988 (11 weeks), Switzerland 2 - Oct 1988 (21 weeks), Belgium 2 - Oct 1988 (10 weeks), Germany Platinum (certified by BMieV in 1989), Springbok 4 - Dec 1988 (11 weeks), US Gold (certified by RIAA in Jan 1989), Norway 5 - Oct 1988 (10 weeks), South Africa 5 of 1989, Sweden 13 - Oct 1988 (4 weeks), Poland 13 - Sep 1988 (11 weeks), POP 13 of 1988, Canada 14 of 1988, Japan (Tokyo) 19 - Nov 1988 (4 weeks), Germany 23 of the 1980s (peak 1 16 weeks), Switzerland 26 of 1989, US CashBox 28 of 1988, Brazil 30 of 1988, US Radio 32 of 1988 (peak 1 8 weeks), US BB 37 of 1988, Scrobulate 92 of happy, Italy 97 of 1989, RIAA 301, RYM 94 of 1988
3	U2	Desire	1988	(Republic of Ireland)	UK 1 - Oct 1988 (13 weeks), Japan (Tokyo) 1 - Nov 1988 (14 weeks), Poland 1 - Oct 1988 (13 weeks), Italy 1 for 2 weeks - Oct 1988, Eire 1 for 4 weeks - Sep 1988, Canada RPM 1 for 4 weeks - Nov 1988, New Zealand 1 for 5 weeks - Oct 1988, Australia 1 for 2 weeks - Oct 1988, Holland 2 - Sep 1988 (11 weeks), US Billboard 3 - Oct 1988 (17 weeks), Belgium 3 - Oct 1988 (9 weeks), US Gold (certified by RIAA in Jan 1989), KROQ 4 of 1988, Norway 5 - Oct 1988 (8 weeks), Canada 5 of 1988, Switzerland 9 - Oct 1988 (12 weeks), ODK Germany 9 - Oct 1988 (14 weeks) (3 weeks in top 10), Italy 10 of 1988, Germany 11 - Oct 1988 (2 months), Sweden 12 - Oct 1988 (3 weeks), Holland free40 20 of 1988, Austria 23 - Nov 1988 (1 month), ARC 34 of 1988 (peak 1 12 weeks), US Radio 54 of 1988 (peak 3 8 weeks), US BB 56 of 1988, Acclaimed 2038 (1988), UK Silver (certified by BPI in Oct 1988), RYM 65 of 1988
4	Billy Ocean	Get Outta My Dreams, Get into My Car	1988	(Trinidad and Tobago) / (United Kingdom)	US Billboard 1 - Feb 1988 (20 weeks), Holland 1 - Jan 1988 (13 weeks), Norway 1 - Feb 1988 (13 weeks), Belgium 1 - Jan 1988 (15 weeks), Eire 1 for 1 week - Feb 1988, Canada RPM 1 for 4 weeks - Apr 1988, Canada 1 of 1988, Australia 1 for 5 weeks - Apr 1988, Springbok 1 - Apr 1988 (23 weeks), UK 3 - Feb 1988 (11 weeks), Switzerland 3 - Mar 1988 (13 weeks), Germany 3 - Mar 1988 (3 months), ODK Germany 3 - Feb 1988 (18 weeks) (9 weeks in top 10), Australia 4 of 1988, US CashBox 6 of 1988, US Radio 6 of 1988 (peak 1 10 weeks), Sweden 7 - Feb 1988 (3 weeks), South Africa 7 of 1988, Austria 8 - Apr 1988 (4 months), US BB 15 of 1988, Poland 19 - Mar 1988 (10 weeks), ARC 23 of 1988 (peak 1 13 weeks), Switzerland 26 of 1988, Brazil 52 of 1988, OzNet 261, Germany 303 of the 1980s (peak 3 11 weeks), UK Silver (certified by BPI in Mar 1988)
5	Guns 'N Roses	Sweet Child o' Mine	1988	(United States)	US Billboard 1 - Jun 1988 (24 weeks), US CashBox 1 of 1988, US (Sup) Platinum (certified by RIAA in Dec 2008), US Radio 4 of 1988 (peak 1 10 weeks), US Gold (certified by RIAA in Jun 2005), US BB 5 of 1988, UK 6 - Aug 1988 (52 weeks), ARC 6 of 1988 (peak 1 14 weeks), Brazil 6 of 1988, POP 6 of 1988, nuTsie 8 of 1980s, France 10 - Sep 1988 (1 week), Switzerland 15 - Jun 1989 (6 weeks), Scrobulate 15 of hard rock, Vinyl Surrender 18 (1987), Holland 24 - Sep 1988 (10 weeks), 24 in 2FM list, Sweden 27 - Jul 2008 (1 week), Belgium 29 - Oct 1989 (1 week), Poland 33 - Sep 1988 (5 weeks), TheQ 36, UK Songs 2013-23 peak 40 - Jan 2014 (5 weeks), Canada 50 of 1988, Japan (Tokyo) 72 - Nov 1988 (2 weeks), DMDB 83 (1988), Acclaimed 109 (1987), Belgium 180 of all time, Rolling Stone 196, RIAA 210, RYM 10 of 1988

=== U.S. best selling singles ===
The following singles achieved the highest chart positions in the U.S. in 1988.

Position	Song title	Artist	Highest position	Weeks at #1
1	Faith	George Michael	1	4
2	Need You Tonight	INXS	1	1
3	Got My Mind Set on You	George Harrison	1	1
4	Never Gonna Give You Up	Rick Astley	1	2
5	Sweet Child o' Mine	Guns N' Roses	1	2

== Top selling albums of the year in the US ==
1. George Michael – Faith
2. Madonna – You Can Dance
3. Michael Jackson – Bad
4. Guns N' Roses – Appetite for Destruction

== Top 40 Chart hit singles ==
The following singles achieved the highest chart positions in the U.S. in 1988.

Song title	Artist(s)	Release date(s)	US	UK	Highest chart position	Other Chart Performance(s)
"1-2-3"	Gloria Estefan & the Miami Sound Machine	June 1988	3	9	3 ( United States)	See chart performance entry
"Angel"	Aerosmith	January 1988	3	69	3 (United States)	2 (U.S. Billboard Mainstream Rock) - 14 (Canada)
"Angel of Harlem"	U2	December 1988	14	9	1 (Canada, New Zealand)	See chart performance entry
"Another Lover"	Giant Steps	June 1988	13	n/a	13 (United States)	10 (U.S. Billboard Hot Dance Club Play) - 12 (U.S. Cash Box Top 100 Singles)
"Another Weekend"	Five Star	May 1988	n/a	18	12 (Ireland)	23 (U.S. Billboard Hot Black Singles) - 24 (Netherlands [Dutch Single Top 100])
"Any Love"	Luther Vandross	August 1988	44	31	31 (Australia)	1 (U.S. Billboard Hot Black Singles) - 12 (U.S. Billboard Adult Contemporary)
"Anything For You"	Gloria Estefan	March 1988	1	10	1 (United States)	1 (U.S. Billboard Adult Contemporary) - 2 (Netherlands [Dutch Top 40]/[Single Top 100]) - 3 (U.S. Billboard Hot Latin Songs) - 5 (Belgium) - 11 (Australia) - 19 (Ireland)
"Atmosphere" (re-release)	Joy Division	August 1988	n/a	34	5 (New Zealand)	n/a
"Blue Monday 1988"	New Order	April 1988	68	3	1 (New Zealand)	See chart performance entry
"Breakaway"	Big Pig	May 1988	60	89	1 (New Zealand)	7 (U.S. Billboard Dance Club SOngs) - 8 (Australia) - 10 (Canada)
"Buffalo Stance"	Neneh Cherry	November 1988	3	3	2 (Greece, Switzerland, West Germany)	See chart performance entry
"Cuddly Toy"	Roachford	May 1988	25	4	4 (US Billboard Hot 100)	See chart performance entry
"I Owe You Nothing"	Bros	June 1988	n/a	1	1 (United Kingdom)	See chart performance entry
"Knocked Out"	Paula Abdul	May 1988	41	21	21 (United Kingdom)	See chart performance entry
"Man in the Mirror"	Michael Jackson	February 1988	1	21	1 (United States)	See chart performance entry
"Never Tear Us Apart"	INXS	August 1988	7	24	2 (Canada)	See chart performance entry
"New Sensation"	INXS	May 1988	3	25	1 (Canada)	See chart performance entry
"Nothin' but a Good Time"	Poison	April 1988	6	35	6 (US Billboard Hot 100)	10 (Australia) - 19 (US Mainstream Rock [Billboard])
"Simply Irresistible"	Robert Palmer	June 1988	2	44	1 (Australia)	1 (U.S. Billboard Modern Rock Tracks) - 2 (U.S. Cash Box) - 2 (Canada) - 6 (New Zealand) - 10 (France) - 57 (West Germany)
"Under the Milky Way"	The Church	February 1988	24	90	22 (Australia)	See chart performance entry

=== Other Chart hit singles ===
- "Bad Medicine" – Bon Jovi
- "Beat Dis" – Bomb The Bass
- "Behind the Wheel" – Depeche Mode (released in 1987)
- "Better Be Home Soon" – Crowded House
- "Big Fun" – Inner City
- "The Blood That Moves The Body" – a-ha
- "Blue Monday 1988" – New Order (remix)
- "Born to Be My Baby" – Bon Jovi
- "Boys (Summertime Love)" – Sabrina Salerno (released in 1987)
- "Bring the Noise" – Public Enemy (released in 1987)
- "Buffalo Stance" – Neneh Cherry
- "Candle In The Wind" – Elton John (live)
- "Cars And Girls" – Prefab Sprout
- "Chains of Love" – Erasure
- "Circle in the Sand" – Belinda Carlisle
- "Como Tu Mujer" – Rocío Dúrcal
- "Crash" – The Primitives
- "Cross My Heart" – Eighth Wonder
- "Cult of Personality" – Living Colour
- *Dear (Cobalt no Kanata e)" – Yōko Oginome
- "Desire" – U2
- "Devil Inside" – INXS
- "Dirty Diana" – Michael Jackson
- "Divine Emotions" – Narada Michael Walden
- "Doctorin' the House" – Coldcut featuring Yazz and the Plastic Population
- "Doctorin' the Tardis" – The Timelords
- "Domino Dancing" – Pet Shop Boys
- "Don't Believe the Hype" – Public Enemy
- "Don't Make Me Wait/Megablast" – Bomb the Bass
- "Don't Talk Dirty to Me" – Jermaine Stewart
- "Don't Worry, Be Happy" – Bobby McFerrin
- "Dreaming" – Orchestral Manoeuvres in the Dark
- "Endless Summer Nights" – Richard Marx
- "Est-ce que tu viens pour les vacances ?" – David et Jonathan
- "Ėtoile des neiges" – Simon et les Modanais
- "Everlasting" – Natalie Cole
- "Every Rose Has Its Thorn" – Poison
- "Everything Your Heart Desires" – Hall & Oates
- "Fast Car" – Tracy Chapman
- "Fiesta" – The Pogues
- "The Flame" – Cheap Trick
- "Fine Time" – New Order
- "First Time" – Robin Beck
- "Foolish Beat" – Debbie Gibson
- "Four Letter Word" – Kim Wilde
- "Free Nelson Mandela" – Special AKA
- "Fría Como el Viento" – Luis Miguel
- "Fu-ji-tsu" – Shizuka Kudo
- "Get Outta My Dreams, Get into My Car" – Billy Ocean
- "Girlfriend" – Pebbles
- "Girl You Know It's True" – Milli Vanilli
- "La Gitane (Ma tête tourne...)" – Félix Gray
- "Giving You the Best That I Got" – Anita Baker
- "Good Life" – Inner City
- "Good Tradition" – Tanita Tikaram
- "Got My Mind Set on You" – George Harrison
- "The Great Commandment" – Camouflage
- "Hands to Heaven" – Breathe
- "Heart" – Pet Shop Boys
- "Heaven Knows" - Robert Plant
- "Heaven is a Place on Earth" – Belinda Carlisle (released in 1987)
- "Hey Mister Heartache" – Kim Wilde
- "Hold Me In Your Arms" – Rick Astley
- "Hold On to the Nights" – Richard Marx
- "Hole in My Heart (All the Way to China)" – Cyndi Lauper
- "Hot in the City" – Billy Idol
- "House Arrest (The Beat Is Law)" – Krush (released in 1987)
- "Hungry Eyes" – Eric Carmen
- "I Don't Wanna Go on with You Like That" – Elton John
- "I Don't Want to Be a Hero" – Johnny Hates Jazz
- "I Don't Want to Live Without You" – Foreigner
- "I Don't Want to Talk About It" – Everything but the Girl
- "I Don't Want Your Love" - Duran Duran
- "I Get Weak" – Belinda Carlisle
- "I Hate Myself for Loving You" – Joan Jett and the Blackhearts
- "I Know You Got Soul" – Eric B. & Rakim
- "I Owe You Nothing" – Bros
- "I Saw Him Standing There" – Tiffany
- "I Should Be So Lucky" – Kylie Minogue
- "I Want You Back" – Bananarama
- "I Want Your Love" – Transvision Vamp
- "I Want to Be Your Man" – Roger
- "I'll Always Love You" – Taylor Dayne
- "I'll Be There for You" – Bon Jovi
- "I'll Be With You" – T'Pau
- "Im Nin'Alu" – Ofra Haza
- "I'm Not Scared" – Eighth Wonder
- "In The Air Tonight" – Phil Collins (remix)
- "Is This Love" – Whitesnake
- "It Takes Two" – Rob Base & DJ E-Z Rock
- "It Would Take a Strong Strong Man" – Rick Astley (#1 Canada)
- "Joe le taxi" – Vanessa Paradis (released in 1987)
- "Johnny B. Goode" – Judas Priest
- "Jour de neige" – Elsa Lunghini (#2 France)
- "The King of Rock 'N' Roll" – Prefab Sprout
- "Kokomo" – The Beach Boys
- "Left to My Own Devices" – Pet Shop Boys
- "Les Parfums de sa vie (Je l'ai tant aimée)" – Art Mengo
- "A Little Respect" – Erasure
- "Look Away" – Chicago
- "Love Bites" – Def Leppard (released in 1987; #1 US)
- "The Lover In Me" – Sheena Easton
- "Lucretia My Reflection" – The Sisters of Mercy
- "Make It Real" – The Jets (#4 US)
- "Make Me Lose Control" – Eric Carmen
- "Man in the Mirror" – Michael Jackson
- "Mercedes Boy" – Pebbles (#2 US)
- "Mistletoe and Wine" – Cliff Richard
- "Monkey" – George Michael
- "My Prerogative" – Bobby Brown
- "Mystify" – INXS (released 1989 in the UK)
- "Need You Tonight" – INXS (released in 1987)
- "Never Knew Love Like This" – Alexander O'Neal
- "Never Tear Us Apart" – INXS
- "Never Trust a Stranger" – Kim Wilde
- "New Sensation" – INXS
- "Nothin' but a Good Time" – Poison
- "Nothing's Gonna Change My Love for You" – Glenn Medeiros (United Kingdom peak)
- "Nuit de folie" – Début de Soirée
- "One More Try" – George Michael
- "One" – Metallica
- "The Only Way Is Up" – Yazz and the Plastic Population
- "Orange Crush" – R.E.M. (released 1989 in the UK)
- "Orinoco Flow" – Enya
- "Pamela" – Toto
- "Paradise" – Sade
- "Paradise City" – Guns N' Roses
- "Parents Just Don't Understand" – DJ Jazzy Jeff & the Fresh Prince
- "The Payback Mix" – James Brown
- "People Are Strange" – Echo & the Bunnymen
- "People Have the Power" – Patti Smith
- "Perfect Strangers" – Anne Murray
- "Piano in the Dark" – Brenda Russell
- "Pink Cadillac" – Natalie Cole (#2 Switzerland, #4 Ireland, Canada)
- "Pour Some Sugar on Me" – Def Leppard (released in 1987; #2 US)
- "Pourvu qu'elles soient douces" – Mylène Farmer (#1 France)
- "Push It/Tramp" – Salt-N-Pepa
- "Put a Little Love in Your Heart" – Annie Lennox & Al Green
- "Quand je t'aime" – Demis Roussos (#3 FR)
- "Quelque chose dans mon cœur" – Elsa Lunghini (#2 FR)
- "Quelque part au Soleil" – Dalida
- "Rag Doll" – Aerosmith
- "Real Gone Kid" – Deacon Blue
- "Revolution Baby" – Transvision Vamp
- "Rockin' Around the Christmas Tree" – Mel & Kim (released December 1987)
- "Rok da House" – The Beatmasters featuring The Cookie Crew (remix/released in 1987)
- "Roll With It" – Steve Winwood
- "Run's House" – Run-D.M.C.
- "Rush Hour" – Jane Wiedlin
- "I Say a Little Prayer" – Bomb The Bass
- "Say It Again" – Jermaine Stewart
- "Secret Land" – Sandra (#7 Germany; #9 Switzerland)
- "Shaday" – Ofra Haza
- "Shake Your Thang (It's Your Thing)" – Salt-N-Pepa featuring E.U.
- "Shattered Dreams" – Johnny Hates Jazz (USA release)
- "Ship of Fools" – Erasure
- "Ship of Fools" – Robert Plant
- "Sidewalking" – The Jesus and Mary Chain
- "Sign Your Name" – Terence Trent D'Arby (released in 1987)
- "Simply Irresistible" – Robert Palmer
- "Slip Away" – Gregg Allman
- "Smooth Criminal" – Michael Jackson
- "So Emotional" – Whitney Houston (released in 1987)
- "Spotlight" – Madonna
- "Stand" – R.E.M.
- "Stand Up for Your Love Rights" – Yazz
- "Stay on These Roads" -a-ha
- “Staying Together” – Debbie Gibson
- "Stop!" – Erasure
- "Stutter Rap (No Sleep 'Til Bedtime)" – Morris Minor and the Majors (#4 UK, #2 Australia)
- "Superfly Guy" – S-Express
- "Suedehead" – Morrissey
- "Sweet Child o' Mine" – Guns N' Roses (released in 1987)
- "Take Me To Your Heart" – Rick Astley
- "Teen Age Riot" – Sonic Youth
- "That's the Way I Wanna Rock 'n' Roll" – AC/DC
- "Theme from S-Express" – S-Express
- "Touched by the Hand of God" – New Order
- "Tougher Than the Rest" – Bruce Springsteen
- "Together Forever" – Rick Astley
- "Toy Soldiers" – Martika
- "Tribute (Right On)" – The Pasadenas
- "Twist and Shout" – Salt-N-Pepa
- "Twist in My Sobriety" – Tanita Tikaram
- "The Twist (Yo Twist)" – Fat Boys & Chubby Checker
- "Un Roman d'amitié (Friend You Give Me a Reason)" – Elsa Lunghini and Glenn Medeiros
- "Waiting For A Star To Fall" – Boy Meets Girl (released on December 10, 1988)
- "Walking Away" – Information Society (#9 US)
- "The Way You Make Me Feel" – Michael Jackson
- "We Call It Acieed" – D Mob featuring Gary Haisman (#3 UK)
- "Wee Rule" – Wee Papa Girl Rappers
- "Welcome to the Jungle" – Guns N' Roses (released in 1987)
- "We'll Be Together" – Sandra
- "(What Can I Say) To Make You Love Me" – Alexander O'Neal
- "What I Am" – Edie Brickell & New Bohemians (released 1989 in the UK; #1 Canada)
- "What You See Is What You Get" – Madonna
- "What's On Your Mind (Pure Energy)" – Information Society (#3 US)
- "When It's Love" - Van Halen
- "Wild World" – Maxi Priest
- "Wishing Well" – Terence Trent D'Arby (released in 1987)
- "Yé ké yé ké" – Mory Kanté (#1 Belgium, Finland, Netherlands, Spain)
- "You Came" – Kim Wilde
- "You Have Placed a Chill in My Heart" – Eurythmics

== Notable singles ==
Song title	Artist(s)	Release date(s)	Other Chart Performance(s)
"A Little Respect"	Erasure	July 1988	See Chart performance entry
"Ain't No Half-Steppin'"	Big Daddy Kane	July 1988	53 (US Billboard Hot Black Singles)
"Ana Ng"	They Might Be Giants	April 1988	11 (US Billboard Modern Rock Tracks)
"Bring the Noise"	Public Enemy	February 1988	56 (US Billboard Hot R&B/Hip-Hop Singles & Tracks)
"Carolyn's Fingers"	Cocteau Twins	June 1988	2 (US Alternative Airplay (Billboard)}
"Cars and Girls"	Prefab Sprout	February 1988	41 (Australia) - 44 (UK Singles Chart)
"Children's Story"	Slick Rick	April 1988	2 (US Billboard Hot Rap Singles) - 5 (US Billboard Hot Black Singles) - 39 (US Billboard Dance Club Songs)
"Coldsweat"	The Sugarcubes	January 1988	2 (UK Indie Charts) - 65 (UK Singles Chart)
"Crash"	The Primitives	February 1988	See Chart performance entry
"Cult of Personality"	Living Colour	July 1988	See Chart performance entry
"Deanna"	Nick Cave and the Bad Seeds	October 1988	4 (UK Indie Charts)
"Devil Inside"	INXS	February 1988	See Chart performance entry
"Dominion"	The Sisters of Mercy	February 1988	7 (Ireland) - 13 (UK Singles Chart) - 30 (US Billboard Dance Club Songs)
"Elephant Stone"	The Stone Roses	September 1988	86 (Australia) - 4 (Ireland) - 8 (UK Singles Chart) Note: The reissue of the single charted in 1990.
"Everyday Is Like Sunday"	Morrissey	May 1988	3 (Irish Singles Chart) - 9 (UK Singles Chart) - 76 (Dutch Single Top 100)
"Fast Car"	Tracy Chapman	April 1988	See Chart performance entry
"Feed Me with Your Kiss" b/w "Keep the Glove"	My Bloody Valentine	September 1988	n/a
"Follow the Leader	Eric B. & Rakim	July 1988	11 (US Billboard Dance Club Songs) - 16 (US Billboard Hot R&B/Hip-Hop Songs) - 21 (UK Singles Chart) - 75 (Netherlands)
"Freak Scene" b/w "Believe Me"	Dinosaur Jr.	October 1988	n/a
"Gigantic"	Pixies	August 1988	93 (UK Singles Chart)
"I Believe In You"	Talk Talk	September 1988	43 (New Zealand) - 65 (Netherlands [Single Top 100]) - 85 (UK Singles Chart)
"If I Should Fall from Grace with God"	The Pogues	January 1988	See Chart performance entry
"Into Temptation	Crowded House	December 1988	20 (Dutch Single Top 100) - 38 (New Zealand) - 59 (Australia) - 64 (Canada)
"Left to My Own Devices"	Pet Shop Boys	November 1988	See Chart performance entry
"Lucretia My Reflection	The Sisters of Mercy	June 1988	20 (UK Singles Charts) - 22 (Ireland) - 30 (US Billboard Dance Club Songs)
"The Mercy Seat"	Nick Cave and the Bad Seeds	June 1988	3 (UK Indie Charts)
"Mother"	Danzig	August 1988	See Chart performance entry
"New Sensation"	INXS	January 1988	See Chart performance entry
"Never Tear Us Apart"	INXS	June 1988	See Chart performance entry
"Orange Crush"	R.E.M.	December 1988	See Chart performance entry
"Orpheus"	David Sylvian	May 1988	n/a
"Reptile"	The Church	July 1988	94 (Australia) - 27 (U.S. Billboard Hot Mainstream Rock Tracks Chart)
"Sidewalking"	The Jesus and Mary Chain	March 1988	20 (Irish Singles Chart) - 23 (New Zealand) - 30 (UK Singles Chart) - 95 (Europe)
"Sister Madly"	Crowded House	August 1988	26 (New Zealand) - 66 (Australia) - 92 (Canada)
"South of Heaven"	Slayer	July 1988	n/a
"Streets of Your Town"	The Go-Betweens	July 1988	30 (New Zealand) - 68 (Australia) - 80 (UK Singles Chart)
"Suedehead"	Morrissey	February 1988	2 (Irish Singles Chart) - 5 (UK Singles Chart) - 18 (Finland) - 30 (Dutch Single Top 100) - 45 (Australia)
"The Evil That Men Do"	Iron Maiden	August 1988	n/a
"The King of Rock 'n' Roll"	Prefab Sprout	March 1988	6 (Ireland) - 7 (UK Singles Chart)
"Teen Age Riot" b/w "Silver Rocket"/"Kissability"	Sonic Youth	October 1988	20 (U.S. Billboard Alternative Airplay)
"There She Goes"	The La's	November 1988	See Chart performance entry
"Trick of the Light"	The Triffids	January 1988	73 (UK Singles Chart) - 77 (Australia)
"Touch Me I'm Sick"	Mudhoney	August 1988	n/a
"Under the Milky Way"	The Church	February 1988	See chart performance entry
"Was There Anything I Could Do?"	The Go-Betweens	October 1988	16 (US Modern Rock Tracks [Billboard])
"You Made Me Realise"	My Bloody Valentine	August 1988	2 (UK Indie Chart)

=== Other Notable singles ===
- "A Kissed Out Red Floatboat" - Cocteau Twins
- "Can You Feel It" - Fingers Inc.
- "Christine" - The House of Love
- "Destination" - The Church
- "Goodbye Mr. Mackenzie" - Goodbye Mr Mackenzie
- "Hail" - Straitjacket Fits
- "House We Used to Live In" - The Smithereens
- "Is This the Life" - Cardiacs
- "Liar, Liar" - Debbie Harry
- "Nobody's Twisting Your Arm" b/w "I'm Not Always So Stupid" - The Wedding Present
- "Secret Garden" - T'Pau
- "(She Was A) Hotel Detective" – They Might Be Giants
- "Thousands Are Sailing" - The Pogues
- "Tugboat" - Galaxie 500
- "Only Dreaming (Wide Awake)" - Red Lorry Yellow Lorry
- "Out of My Hands" - Died Pretty
- "Surrender" – Suicide
- "Towers of Strength" – Died Pretty
- "Viento" - Caifanes

== Classical music ==
- Gerald Barry – Cheveux-de-frise
- Luciano Berio – Sequenza XI
- George Crumb – Zeitgeist (Tableaux Vivants) for two amplified pianos
- Mario Davidovsky – Synchronisms No. 9 for violin and tape
- Joël-François Durand – Die innere Grenze for string sextet
- Lorenzo Ferrero – La cena delle beffe (incidental music)
- Michael Finnissy – Red Earth for orchestra
- Henryk Górecki – String Quartet No. 1, "Already it is Dusk"
- Stephen Hartke – Pacific Rim Overture
- Vagn Holmboe – Symphony No. 12, M. 338
- Wojciech Kilar – Choralvorspiel (Choral Prelude) for chamber string orchestra
- Witold Lutosławski – Concerto for Piano and Orchestra
- Frederik Magle – We Are Afraid (Vi er bange), cantata for choir and chamber orchestra
- Carin Malmlöf-Forssling – String Quartet No. 1, "Silverkvartetten"
- António Chagas Rosa – Piano Sonata
- Kaija Saariaho – Petals for cello and electronics
- Bogusław Schaeffer – Concerto for Piano Duet and Orchestra
- Alfred Schnittke
  - Concerto for Piano four hands and Orchestra
  - Piano Quartet
  - Symphony No. 5 (Concerto Grosso No. 4)
  - Klingende Buchstaben
- Peter Sculthorpe – Kakadu
- Philip Sparke – Concerto Grosso
- Bent Sørensen
  - Angels' Music for string quartet
  - Camelot by Night for bass flute and guitar
  - La Notte for piano and orchestra
- Tōru Takemitsu – Tree Line for chamber orchestra
- John Tavener – The Akathist of Thanksgiving
- Takashi Yoshimatsu – Concerto for Bassoon "Unicorn Circuit"

=== Opera ===
- Philip Glass – 1000 Airplanes on the Roof
- Karlheinz Stockhausen – Montag aus Licht (La Scala, Milan, May 7)

== Musical theater ==
- Bitter Sweet (Noël Coward) – London revival
- Chess (Tim Rice, Benny Andersson & Björn Ulvaeus) – Broadway production opened at the Imperial Theatre and closed after 65 performances
- The Phantom of the Opera (Andrew Lloyd Webber) – Broadway production opened at the Majestic Theatre, and has the longest continuous run in Broadway history, with over 10,000 performances to date
- Sarafina – Broadway production opened at the Cort Theatre and ran for 597 performances

== Musical films ==
- Bird
- Bridge
- The Decline of Western Civilization Part II: The Metal Years
- Daisy
- Dhwani
- Imagine: John Lennon
- La Bailanta
- Moonwalker
- Rattle and Hum
- Satisfaction
- Tapeheads
- Tougher Than Leather

== Births ==
- January 7 – Hardwell, Dutch DJ and record producer
- January 8 – Haruka Abe, Japanese actress
- January 11 – Li Qinyao, Chinese actress and singer
- January 14
  - Mikalah Gordon, American Idol contestant
  - Jordy, French singer
- January 15
  - Jessica Poland, American singer-songwriter
  - Skrillex, American musician and DJ
- January 16
  - FKA Twigs, born Tahliah Barnett, English singer-songwriter, dancer, advocate and actress
  - Alex Gonzaga, Filipina singer
- January 20 – Victoria Asher, American musician
- January 21
  - Glaiza de Castro, Filipino actress and singer
  - AGA, Hong Kong singer-songwriter
- January 24 – Jade Ewen, English actress and singer
- January 25 – Yasmien Kurdi, Filipina pop singer
- February 3 – Cho Kyu Hyun, Korean pop singer (Super Junior)
- February 6 – Bailey Hanks, American actress and singer
- February 7
  - Ai Kago, J-pop singer
  - Lee Joon, Korean idol K-pop singer (MBLAQ), dancer, actor and model
  - (or 1974) – Jihae, South Korean rock singer and actress
- February 8 – Ao Li, Chinese operatic bass-baritone
- February 11
  - Li Qinyao (Jun Jun), Chinese J-pop singer and actress
  - Paul Kim, K-pop singer
- February 13
  - Aston Merrygold, English R&B singer (JLS)
  - Mike Posner, American singer-songwriter, poet, DJ and music producer
- February 17 – Rod Michael, American singer (B3)
- February 18 – Max Changmin, K-pop singer
- February 20 – Rihanna, Barbadian pop singer
- February 22 – Jay Fung, Hong Kong singer-songwriter
- February 23 – Ashley Cooper, New Zealand pop singer
- February 27 – JD Natasha, born Natasha Jeannette Dueñas, American Latin music artist
- February 28
  - Milly Edwards, Australian Idol contestant
  - Markéta Irglová, Czech songwriter
- March 2
  - James Arthur, English singer-songwriter
  - Kate Alexa, Australian pop rock singer
  - Esther Povitsky, American actress, singer, comedian, writer and producer
  - Nadine Samonte, German pop singer
- March 6 – Agnes Carlsson, Swedish pop singer
- March 8
  - Benny Blanco, American record producer, songwriter, musician (Dating Selena Gomez)
  - Johnny Ruffo, Australian singer, songwriter, dancer, actor and television presenter (d. 2023)
- March 10 – Patrick Henry Hughes, American tenor and trumpeter
- March 15 – Lil Dicky, American comedy-rapper
- March 16 – Jhené Aiko, American singer-songwriter and rapper
- March 17 – Grimes (born Claire Boucher), Canadian singer-songwriter, musician, engineer, record producer, visual artist, feminist, activist and producer (collaborator of Hana)
- March 18
  - Agir, Portuguese singer and composer
  - Soukaina Boukries, Moroccan singer
- March 21 – Gabriela Isler, Venezuelan model and beauty queen
- March 25
  - Big Sean, American rapper
  - Ryan Lewis, American musician
  - Wesley Klein, Dutch singer
- March 27 – Jessie J, English singer-songwriter
- March 31 – Conrad Sewell, Australian singer-songwriter
- April 12 – Jessie James Decker, American country pop singer
- April 17 – Takahiro Moriuchi, Japanese singer (One Ok Rock)
- April 19 – Alfie Arcuri, Australian singer-songwriter
- April 22 – Léo Santana, Brazilian singer, composer, and percussionist
- April 24 – Natalie Zahra, Australian Idol contestant
- April 25 – Sara Paxton, American singer, actress
- April 27
  - Alfred Hui, Hong Kong singer
  - Lizzo, born Melissa Jefferson, American singer-songwriter, actress, rapper and activist
  - Pop Wansel, American record producer, musician and songwriter
- April 29
  - Younha, Japanese and Korean pop singer
  - Michael Ray, American country music singer-songwriter
- May 5
  - Adele, English singer-songwriter
  - Brooke Hogan, American actress, singer-songwriter and wrestler
  - Skye Sweetnam, Canadian singer-songwriter, actress and music video director (Sumo Cyco)
- May 8 – Trisha Paytas, American Internet personality, actress and singer-songwriter
- May 11
  - Ace Hood, American rapper
  - Nikki Cleary, American pop-rock singer
- May 13 – Casey Donovan, Australian Idol winner, 2004
- May 15 – Lunice, Canadian record producer and DJ (TNGHT)
- May 18 – Tanner Wayne, American drummer (Underminded, Chiodos and Scary Kids Scaring Kids)
- May 19 - Anyma, American DJ and producer (Tale of Us)
- May 21 – Park Gyu-ri, South Korean idol singer
- May 22 – Roy English, also known as Jagwar Twin, American singer-songwriter, musician and record producer
- May 24 – Billy Gilman, American country singer
- May 27 - J-Min, South Korean singer-songwriter
- June 1
  - Héloïse Letissier, French singer-songwriter (Christine and the Queens)
  - Nami Tamaki, Japanese singer
- June 2
  - Danny Parker, American songwriter
  - Bảo Thy, Vietnamese singer and actress
- June 3 – Dave East, American rapper
- June 6 – Neha Kakkar, Indian pop singer
- June 7 – Michael Cera, Canadian actor, comedian, producer and singer-songwriter
- June 9 – Mae Whitman, American actress, voice actress and singer
- June 11 – Weyes Blood, American musician
- June 12 – Dave Melillo, American singer-songwriter
- June 14 – Kevin McHale, American actor, singer, dancer and radio personality
- June 16
  - Banks, American singer-songwriter
  - Keshia Chanté, Canadian urban singer
- June 18 – Josh Dun, American multi-instrumentalist and producer (House Of Heroes, Twenty One Pilots)r
- June 20 – May J., Japanese R&B singer
- June 21 – Beatrice Egli, Swiss singer
- June 22
  - Miliyah Kato, Japanese R&B singer
  - Vicky Psarakis, Greek-American vocalist-singer-songwriter, lead singer of The Agonist
- June 23
  - Isabella Leong, Hong Kong singer, actress and model
  - Jasmine Kara, Swedish singer-songwriter
- June 24 – Nichkhun Horvejkul, Thai singer
- June 27 – Colin Tilley, American music video director and film maker
- June 28 – Julian Waterfall Pollack, American jazz pianist and composer
- June 29 – Martina Šindlerová, Slovak pop singer
- June 30 – Jai Paul, English songwriter, record producer and recording artist
- July 2 – Amali Ward, Australian Idol contestant
- July 6
  - Katy Tiz, British singer
  - Brittany Underwood, American actress and singer
- July 7 – Kaci Brown, American pop/R&B singer
- July 8
  - Reinaldo Zavarce, Venezuelan actor and singer
  - Shocka, English rapper and mental health advocate
- July 11 – Natalie La Rose, Dutch singer-songwriter and dancer
- July 12 – Melissa O'Neil, Canadian Idol winner, Canadian singer and actress
- July 13
  - Tulisa Contostavlos, English singer-songwriter and member of N-Dubz
  - Colton Haynes, American actor, model and singer
  - Mitch Rowland, American songwriter and multi-instrumentalist (Harry Styles)
- July 17 – Anderson East, American rhythm and blues singer/songwriter
- July 19 – Charlene Soraia, English singer-songwriter and mental health activist
- July 20 – Julianne Hough, American dancer, singer and actress
- July 24 – Han Seung-yeon, South Korean singer and actress
- July 25 – Sarah Geronimo, Filipina pop singer
- July 28 – Nick Santino, American singer-songwriter and guitarist (A Rocket to the Moon)
- July 31 – Ruston Kelly, American country singer-songwriter (Kacey Musgraves)
- August 1 – Olia Tira, Moldovan singer
- August 2
  - Chris Sebastian, Australian singer-songwriter (two time contestant of The Voice Australia, one time on Seal get to round 16 (2012) and won on team Kelly Rowland (2020), brother of Guy Sebastian)
  - Brittany Hargest, American pop singer
- August 3
  - Sierra Ferrell, American singer-songwriter and musician
  - Shelley FKA DRAM, American rapper, singer, and record producer
- August 4 – Tom Parker, English singer-songwriter (The Wanted) (d. 2022)
- August 11 – Hoàng Thùy Linh, Vietnamese singer and actress
- August 13 – MØ, Danish singer-songwriter
- August 16 – Rumer Willis, American singer and actress
- August 18 – G-Dragon, Korean rapper, singer-songwriter and producer
- August 19 – Hoodie Allen, American rapper, singer-songwriter
- August 21
  - Paris Bennett, American singer
  - Kacey Musgraves, American country singer-songwriter
- August 23 – Alice Glass, Canadian singer-songwriter
- August 24 – Kelly Lee Owens, Welsh electronic musician
- August 25 – Alexandra Burke, English singer-songwriter and actress, X Factor winner
- August 26
  - Erik Hassle, Swedish pop singer-songwriter
  - Evan Ross, American actor and musician (Diana Ross, Ashlee Simpson)
- August 27 – Alexa Vega, American musical performer, actor and pop singer
- September 3 – Devon Welsh, Canadian singer-songwriter (Majical Cloudz, Grimes)
- September 6
  - Max George, English singer-songwriter and actor
  - Gustav Schäfer, German rock drummer (Tokio Hotel)
- September 12
  - Amanda Jenssen, Swedish singer
  - Petros Iakovidis, Greek singer
  - Matt Martians, American record producer
- September 14 – Muni Long, American singer and songwriter
- September 16 – Teddy Geiger, American singer-songwriter
- September 19 – Reigan Derry, Australian singer-songwriter
- September 22 – Bethany Dillon, American Christian-music artist
- Sana Saeed, Indian actress
- September 26
  - James Blake, English singer-songwriter, musician and record producer (Jameela Jamil, Theresa Waymen)
  - Lilly Singh, Canadian vlogger, singer, rapper and artist
- September 27 – Alma, French singer-songwriter
- September 28
  - Esmée Denters, Dutch singer and YouTuber
  - Hana Mae Lee, American actress, model, singer and fashion designer (Pitch Perfect)
- September 30 – Jyongri, Japanese pop singer
- October 2 – Andreas Moe, Swedish singer-songwriter, producer and multi-instrumentalist
- October 2 – Brittany Howard, American singer-songwriter
- October 3 – A$AP Rocky, American rapper, producer, part of the ASAP mob (Rihanna)
- October 4
  - Jessica Benson, American R&B singer
  - Melissa Benoist, American actress and singer
- October 5 – Kevin Olusola, Nigerian musician, beatboxer, cellist, rapper, record producer and singer-songwriter
- October 5 – Maja Salvador, Filipino actress and television personality
- October 5 – Bahar Kizil, German singer and songwriter
- October 11 – Knut Eirik Kokkin, Norwegian singer
- October 12 – Calum Scott, English singer-songwriter
- October 13 – Đông Nhi, Vietnamese singer
- October 14
  - Kobra Paige, Canadian singer and songwriter
  - Pia Toscano, American singer
- October 17
  - Dami Im, Korean-born Australian singer-songwriter, multi-instrumentalist
  - Nikki Flores, American Independent pop singer, musician, songwriter and vocal producer
- October 20
  - Risa Niigaki, Japanese pop singer
  - A$AP Ferg, American rapper, part of the ASAP mob
  - Balqees, Emirati singer
- October 28 – Jamie xx, English musician, DJ, record producer and remixer
- October 30 – Janel Parrish, American actress and singer
- November 2 – Elgiazar Farashyan, Belarusian singer
- November 6
  - Emma Stone, American actress, musical star and singer
  - Conchita Wurst, Austrian singer and drag queen, Eurovision Song Contest 2014 winner
- November 7 – Tinie Tempah, English rapper, singer-songwriter
- November 8 – Pauli Lovejoy, English drummer, recording artist, music director and model
- November 10
  - Chisaki Hama, Japanese singer
  - Cazzi Opeia, Swedish DJ, producer, singer and songwriter
- November 16
  - Siva Kaneswaran, Irish singer, model, actor and songwriter
  - Sampha, English singer-songwriter and record producer
- November 26 – Blake Harnage, American songwriter, music producer, multi-instrumentalist and composer
- November 28 – Scarlett Pomers, American singer/actress
- November 30 – Eir Aoi, Japanese singer
- December 1
  - Tyler Joseph, American singer-songwriter, multi-instrumentalist, record producer and rapper (Twenty One Pilots)
  - Zoë Kravitz, American actress, singer and model (lolawolf)
- December 6 – Sandra Nurmsalu, Estonian musician
- December 7
  - Emily Browning, Australian actress and singer (Sucker Punch, God Help the Girl, Plush)
  - Toru Yamashita, Japanese singer (One Ok Rock)
  - Benjamin Clementine, English-born singer-songwriter
  - Min, Vietnamese singer
- December 12 – Hahm Eun-jung, South Korean singer
- December 14
  - Awkwafina, American rapper, comedienne, actor
  - Vanessa Hudgens, American actor, singer, dancer
- December 16 – Park Seo-joon, South Korean actor and singer
- December 17 – Jessi, American-South Korean rapper and singer (Uptown)
- December 19 – Casey Burgess, Australian singer-songwriter and actress
- December 20 – Mária Čírová, Slovak singer
- December 21 – Alexa Goddard, English pop/R&B singer, YouTuber
- December 23 – Eri Kamei, Japanese pop singer
- December 25 – Marco Mengoni, Italian singer-songwriter
- December 26 – Veronika Eberle, German violinist
- December 27
  - Hayley Williams, American singer-songwriter, musician, businesswoman and activist (Paramore)
  - Lou Yixiao, Chinese singer
- December 28 – Florrie, English singer-songwriter, drummer and model.
- December 30 – Leon Jackson, Scottish singer
- December 31 – Holly Holyoake, Welsh classical soprano singer

== Deaths ==
- January 3 – John Dopyera, stringed instrument maker, 94
- January 19 – Evgeny Mravinsky, conductor
- February 3 – Radamés Gnattali, Brazilian composer, 81
- February 9 – Kurt Herbert Adler, conductor and opera administrator
- February 14 – Frederick Loewe, composer of musicals, 86
- February 16 – Jean Carignan, fiddler, 71
- February 17 – Alexander Bashlachev, Russian singer, 27 (suicide by jumping)
- February 24 – Memphis Slim, blues musician, 72
- February 27 – Gene de Paul, pianist and composer, 68
- March 6 – Jeanne Aubert, singer and actress, 88
- March 7 – Divine, singer and drag entertainer, 42 (heart failure)
- March 8 – Henryk Szeryng, violinist
- March 10 – William Wordsworth, Scottish composer
- March 10 – Andy Gibb, singer, 30 (myocarditis)
- March 12 – Gianna Pederzini, operatic mezzo-soprano, 88
- March 15 – Frank Perkins, American song composer
- March 20 – Gil Evans, Canadian jazz pianist, composer and bandleader
- April 3 – Kai Ewans, Danish jazz musician
- April 7 – Cesar Bresgen, Austrian composer
- April 9
  - Brook Benton, 56 (complications of spinal meningitis)
  - David Prater, of Sam & Dave, 50 (car accident)
- April 15 – Youri Egorov, Soviet classical pianist, 33 (complications of AIDS)
- April 20 - Frederick Sharp, English baritone, 76
- April 29 – James McCracken, tenor, 61
- May 1 – Claude Demetrius, songwriter
- May 10 – Ciarán Bourke, folk musician (The Dubliners), 53 (brain damage)
- May 13 – Chet Baker, jazz musician, 58 (head injuries from fall)
- May 21 – Sammy Davis Sr., vaudeville performer, 87
- May 22 – Dennis Day, US singer, 72
- May 25 – Martin Slavin, composer and music director, 66
- June 12 – Marcel Poot, Belgian composer, 87
- June 22 – Jesse Ed Davis, guitarist, 43
- June 25
  - Hillel Slovak, Red Hot Chili Peppers, guitarist, 26 (speedball overdose)
  - Jimmy Soul, American singer, 45 (heart attack)
- July 2 – Eddie Vinson, jazz/blues musician, 70
- July 18
  - Joly Braga Santos, Portuguese composer and conductor, 64
  - Nico, German singer, 49 (brain haemorrhage)
- July 20 – Richard Holm, German operatic tenor
- July 28 – Pete Drake, American record producer and pedal steel guitar player, 55 (emphysema)
- August – Tenor Saw, dancehall artist, 21 (road accident)
- August 8 – Félix Leclerc, folk singer, 74
- August 9 – Giacinto Scelsi, composer and poet, 83
- August 14
  - Roy Buchanan, American guitarist, 48 (suicide)
  - Robert Calvert, South African writer, poet, and musician, 43 (heart attack)
- August 19 – Sir Frederick Ashton, British choreographer, 83
- August 22 – Frances James, operatic soprano, 85
- August 24
  - Kenneth Leighton, English composer, 58 (cancer)
  - Nat Stuckey, American country singer
- September 17 – Hilde Gueden, operatic soprano, 71
- September 22 – Rezső Sugár, Hungarian composer, 68
- September 23 – Arwel Hughes, composer and conductor
- September 26 – Lord Melody, calypso musician, 62
- October 7 – Billy Daniels, singer, 73
- October 15 – Kaikhosru Shapurji Sorabji, English composer, music critic and pianist
- October 18 – Sir Frederick Ashton, dancer and choreographer
- October 19 – Son House, blues musician
- October 20 – Mogens Wöldike, Danish conductor
- November 8 – Warren Casey, US theatre composer, lyricist, writer, and actor, 53 (AIDS-related)
- November 13
  - Antal Doráti, conductor, 82
  - Jaromír Vejvoda, Czech composer, 86
- November 24 – Irmgard Seefried, operatic soprano, 69
- November 26 – Antonio Estévez, composer
- November 30 – Charlie Rouse, saxophonist, 64
- December 2 – Tata Giacobetti, Italian singer and lyricist (Quartetto Cetra)
- December 6 – Roy Orbison, singer, 52 (heart attack)
- December 13 – André Jaunet, 77, French-born Swiss flautist
- December 16 – Sylvester, R&B singer, disco performer, 41 (complications from AIDS)
- December 21 – Paul Jeffreys, bassist (Cockney Rebel), 36 (killed in the crash of Pan Am Flight 103)
- December 25 – Evgeny Golubev, Russian composer, 78
- December 26 – Pablo Sorozábal, Spanish composer, 91
- date unknown
  - Kenneth Morris, gospel composer and publisher, 71
  - Håkan Parkman, Swedish composer, arranger and choral director, 33 (drowned)

== Awards ==
- The following artists are inducted into the Rock and Roll Hall of Fame: The Beach Boys, The Beatles, The Drifters, Bob Dylan and The Supremes.

=== Grammy Awards ===
- Grammy Awards of 1988

=== Country Music Association Awards ===
- 1988 Country Music Association Awards

=== Eurovision Song Contest ===
- Eurovision Song Contest 1988

== Charts ==
- List of Billboard Hot 100 number ones of 1988
- 1988 in British music#Charts
- List of Oricon number-one singles of 1988

== See also ==
- Record labels established in 1988
