= List of number-one singles of 1988 (France) =

This is a list of the French SNEP Top 100 Singles number-ones of 1988.

== Summary ==
=== Singles Chart ===
Week	Issue Date	Artist	Single
1	2 January	Guesch Patti	"Étienne"
2	9 January	Guesch Patti	"Étienne"
3	16 January	Guesch Patti	"Étienne"
4	23 January	Guesch Patti	"Étienne"
5	30 January	Guesch Patti	"Étienne"
6	6 February	Sabrina	"Boys (Summertime Love)"
7	13 February	Sabrina	"Boys (Summertime Love)"
8	20 February	Sabrina	"Boys (Summertime Love)"
9	27 February	Sabrina	"Boys (Summertime Love)"
10	5 March	Sabrina	"Boys (Summertime Love)"
11	12 March	Glenn Medeiros	"Nothing's Gonna Change My Love for You"
12	19 March	Glenn Medeiros	"Nothing's Gonna Change My Love for You"
13	26 March	Glenn Medeiros	"Nothing's Gonna Change My Love for You"
14	2 April	Glenn Medeiros	"Nothing's Gonna Change My Love for You"
15	9 April	Glenn Medeiros	"Nothing's Gonna Change My Love for You"
16	16 April	Glenn Medeiros	"Nothing's Gonna Change My Love for You"
17	23 April	Glenn Medeiros	"Nothing's Gonna Change My Love for You"
18	30 April	Glenn Medeiros	"Nothing's Gonna Change My Love for You"
19	7 May	Florent Pagny	"N'importe quoi"
20	14 May	Florent Pagny	"N'importe quoi"
21	21 May	Florent Pagny	"N'importe quoi"
22	28 May	Florent Pagny	"N'importe quoi"
23	4 June	Florent Pagny	"N'importe quoi"
24	11 June	Florent Pagny	"N'importe quoi"
25	18 June	Florent Pagny	"N'importe quoi"
26	25 June	Florent Pagny	"N'importe quoi"
27	2 July	Sandy	"J'ai faim de toi"
28	9 July	Sandy	"J'ai faim de toi"
29	16 July	Début de Soirée	"Nuit de folie"
30	23 July	Début de Soirée	"Nuit de folie"
31	30 July	Début de Soirée	"Nuit de folie"
32	6 August	Début de Soirée	"Nuit de folie"
33	13 August	Début de Soirée	"Nuit de folie"
34	20 August	Début de Soirée	"Nuit de folie"
35	27 August	Début de Soirée	"Nuit de folie"
36	3 September	Début de Soirée	"Nuit de folie"
37	10 September	Début de Soirée	"Nuit de folie"
38	17 September	Elsa and Glenn Medeiros	"Un Roman d'amitié (Friend You Give Me Reason)"
39	24 September	Elsa and Glenn Medeiros	"Un Roman d'amitié (Friend You Give Me Reason)"
40	1 October	Elsa and Glenn Medeiros	"Un Roman d'amitié (Friend You Give Me Reason)"
41	8 October	Elsa and Glenn Medeiros	"Un Roman d'amitié (Friend You Give Me Reason)"
42	15 October	Elsa and Glenn Medeiros	"Un Roman d'amitié (Friend You Give Me Reason)"
43	22 October	Elsa and Glenn Medeiros	"Un Roman d'amitié (Friend You Give Me Reason)"
44	29 October	Paco	"Amor de mis amores"
45	5 November	Paco	"Amor de mis amores"
46	12 November	Paco	"Amor de mis amores"
47	19 November	Paco	"Amor de mis amores"
48	26 November	Paco	"Amor de mis amores"
49	3 December	Mylène Farmer	"Pourvu qu'elles soient douces"
50	10 December	Mylène Farmer	"Pourvu qu'elles soient douces"
51	17 December	Mylène Farmer	"Pourvu qu'elles soient douces"
52	24 December	Mylène Farmer	"Pourvu qu'elles soient douces"
53	31 December	Mylène Farmer	"Pourvu qu'elles soient douces"

== See also ==
- 1988 in music
- List of number-one hits (France)
- List of artists who reached number one on the French Singles Chart
