= Chambourcy (company) =

French company

Chambourcy is a French company specializing in the production of yogurts and fresh dairy products. Since 1996, it has been owned by the Nestlé Group (a Swiss company).

== History ==
The name Chambourcy was given in 1934 to a type of fresh cheese (petit-suisse) marketed in the Parisian region by the ALB dairy. One of the three leaders of the dairy, Pierre Abouyaka, owned a property in the town of Chambourcy (ALB corresponds to the initials of the leaders Pierre Aboukaya, Guy Lapeyre, and Xavier Baillivet).

The dairy was sold in 1962 to the Benoît brothers, who owned a company manufacturing yogurts under the name société J. A. Benoit. In 1966, the two companies merged, and only the name Chambourcy was retained.

The company experienced significant growth, reaching the third position in the French market for fresh dairy products in 1978, behind Gervais and Yoplait. This was partly made possible by a partnership with Nestlé, which acquired a 20% stake in the company in 1968, allowing the brand to export its products outside of France and to regain the La Laitière brand, which Nestlé had owned since 1905 through its merger with the English company Condensed Milk Co, but was no longer using.

In 1987, the company launched the famous slogan Chambourcy, oh oui (Chambourcy, oh yes), interpreted by Sandy. In 1988, Chambourcy merged with La Roche-aux-Fées, a company owned by Unilever and operating in the same sector. The La Roche aux fées brand disappeared in favor of Chambourcy, but the Yoco and Créola brands were retained.

== Disappearance and revivals ==
In 1996, Nestlé acquired Chambourcy, and the brand ceased to be marketed.

The Chambourcy logo, with its colors and the small five-petal flower (different from that of the competing brand Yoplait), was retained, but the name Chambourcy was replaced by Nestlé.

The new advertising slogan, "Nestlé, c'est bon la vie" (Nestlé, it's good for life), used the melody of the jingle "Chambourcy, oh oui" (Chambourcy, oh yes).

The brand reappeared on store shelves in 1999 when a Bordeaux-based company, CBSA, founded by two former Nestlé executives, acquired the brand and the Carbon-Blanc factory.

However, due to strict non-compete clauses imposed by Nestlé, the new owners could only market organic products, and the company went bankrupt in 2002.

Chambourcy made a second comeback in 2010 with its Kremly yogurt, which, like all other fresh dairy products under the Nestlé brand, is produced by Lactalis Nestlé Fresh Dairy Products.

The brand reappeared once again under the name "Chambourcy Petit" around 2021.
