= Douce violence =

Douce violence may refer to:

- Douce violence (film)
- Douce violence (album)
