= À la même heure dans deux ans =

1989 single by Elsa Lunghini

Single by Elsa Lunghini

from the album Elsa
- B-side: "Sud-Africaine"
- Released: April 1989
- Recorded: 1988
- Genre: Pop
- Length: 3:30
- Label: Ariola
- Songwriter(s): Georges Lunghini, Pierre Grosz, Raymond Donnez
- Producer(s): Georges Mary Productions

Elsa Lunghini singles chronology
"Jour de neige" (1988)	"À la même heure dans deux ans" (1989)	"Jamais nous" (1989)

"À la même heure dans deux ans" (transl. French for "At the Same Time in Two Years") is a 1988 pop song recorded by French singer Elsa Lunghini. Written by Pierre Grosz with music composed by Raymond Donnez and Georges Lunghini, it was released in April 1989 as the fourth single from her debut album Elsa, on which it is the tenth track. Later, in 1997, it was also included on Elsa's best of compilation Elsa, l'essentiel 1986–1993. As for Elsa's previous singles, it became a hit in France, reaching number seven.

== Lyrics and music video ==
Lyrically, "À la même heure dans deux ans" is about the possible life changes of a group of friends in a two-year span and wonders whatever they will remain friends. The music video accompagning the song was directed by Denis Maillet and was shot on a beach in Normandy, showing her with her friends on the occasion of her birthday. Elsa sung "À la même heure dans deux ans" during her concert tour in 1990 which started at the Olympia, but she did not perform it during her next concerts.

== Chart performances ==
In France, "À la même heure dans deux ans" debuted at number 25 on the chart edition of 29 April 1989, entered the top ten four weeks later where it stayed for non consecutive five weeks, peaked at number seven for a sole week in its eighth week, and fell off the top 50 after 15 weeks of presence. On the European Hot 100 Singles, it debuted at number 76 on 13 May 1989 and reached a peak of number 29 in its eighth week, and left the chart after 13 weeks. It peaked at number 46 on the European Airplay Top 50 where it charted for one week.

== Track listings ==
- 7" single - France
1. "À la même heure dans deux ans" — 3:30
2. "Sud-Africaine" — 3:50
- CD maxi - France, Germany
1. "À la même heure dans deux ans" — 3:30
2. "Sud-Africaine" — 3:50
3. "Jour de neige" (extended version) — 8:02
- CD single - Japan
1. "À la même heure dans deux ans" — 3:46
2. "À la même heure dans deux ans" -instrumental) — 3:44
- 7" single - Promo - Canada, Japan
1. "À la même heure dans deux ans" — 3:30

== Charts ==
Chart (1989)	Peak position
Europe (European Airplay Top 50)	46
Europe (European Hot 100)	29
France (Airplay Chart [AM Stations])	5
France (SNEP)	7
Quebec (ADISQ)	26

== Release history ==
Country	Date	Format	Label
France	1989	CD maxi	Ariola
France	1989	7" single	Ariola
Germany	1989	CD maxi	Ariola
Japan	1989	Promotional 7" single	Ariola
Japan	1989	CD single	Ariola
Canada	1989	Promotional 7" single	Star Records
