= Jamais nous =

1989 single by Elsa Lunghini

Single by Elsa Lunghini

from the album Elsa
- B-side: "Nostalgie Cinéma"
- Released: September 1989
- Recorded: 1988
- Genre: Pop
- Length: 3:50
- Label: Ariola
- Composer(s): Vincent-Marie Bouvot, Georges Lunghini
- Lyricist(s): Didier Barbelivien
- Producer(s): Georges Mary Productions, Vincent-Marie Bouvot, Georges Lunghini

Elsa Lunghini singles chronology
"À la même heure dans deux ans" (1989)	"Jamais nous" (1989)	"Mon Cadeau" (1990)

"Jamais nous" (transl. French for "Never Us") is a 1988 pop song recorded by French singer Elsa Lunghini with the participation of French singer Laurent Voulzy in the background vocals of the chorus. Written by Didier Barbelivien with a music composed by Vincent-Marie Bouvot and Georges Lunghini, it was released first in 1988, then in a remixed version in September 1989 as the fifth and last single from her debut album Elsa, on which it is the seventh track. Later, in 1997, it was also included on Elsa's best of compilation Elsa, l'essentiel 1986–1993. It became a hit in France, reaching number ten, which allowed Elsa to establish at the time the record of the most top ten singles from the same album on the French charts.

== Music video ==
The music video for "Jamais nous" was directed by Maxime Ruiz and filmed in the Studios de cinéma d'Arpajon. It displays Elsa dressed in black performing the song surrounded by many white veils.

== Versions ==
Elsa sung "Jamais nous" during all her concert tours, and this was the only song from her 1988 album Elsa that she accepts to perform on television, as she said in interviews that the other songs from this album no longer fit with what she had become. "Jamais nous" was included on the 2006 live album Connexion Live. A Spanish version Dos bichos raros without Laurent Voulzy is also available on the compilation Elsa, l'essentiel 1986-1993.

== Critical reception ==
About "Jamais nous", a review in Pan-European magazine Music & Media said: "The French starlet with the gentle voice shines one sweet and fragile ballad. File it under "Lolita-pop"".

== Chart performances ==
In France, "Jamais nous" debuted at number 40 on the chart edition of 7 October 1989, peaked at number ten for a sole week in its tenth week, and fell off the top 50 after 18 weeks of presence. Elsa thus became the first artist to obtain five top ten hit singles from a same album on the French Singles Chart, a feat later broken by Michael Jackson's album Dangerous, which provided seven top ten hits. The single earned a Gold disc awarded by the Syndicat National de l'Édition Phonographique. On the European Hot 100 Singles, it debuted at number 99 on 21 October 1989 and reached a peak of number 41 in its tenth week, and left the chart after 15 weeks.

== Track listings ==
1988 release

- 7" single - France
1. "Jamais nous" — 3:50
2. "À la même heure dans deux ans" — 3:30
- 12" maxi - Germany
1. "Jamais nous" — 3:50
2. "Jour de neige" — 4:00
3. "À la même heure dans deux ans" — 3:30
4. "Jimmy voyage" — 4:20

1989 release

- 7" single - France, Germany
1. "Jamais nous" (remix) — 3:50
2. "Nostalgie Cinéma" — 2:50
- CD maxi - France, Germany
1. "Jamais nous" (remix) — 3:50
2. "Nostalgie Cinéma" — 2:50
3. "Jamais nous" (instrumental version) — 4:00
- 12" maxi - France, Germany
1. "Jamais nous" (remix) — 3:50
2. "Nostalgie Cinéma" — 2:50
3. "Jamais nous" (instrumental version) — 4:00
- 7" single - Promo - Canada
1. "Jamais nous" — 3:54

== Personnel ==
- Arrangements— Raymond Donnez
- Mixing — Bruno Lambert
- Production — Vincent-Marie Bouvot
- Photography, production — Georges Lunghini
- Remix — Jean Philippe

== Charts and certifications ==
=== Weekly charts ===
Chart (1989)	Peak position
Europe (European Hot 100)	41
France (SNEP)	10
Quebec (ADISQ)	15

=== Certifications ===
Certifications for "Jamais nous"
Region	Certification	Certified units/sales
France (SNEP)	Silver	200,000^{*}
^{*} Sales figures based on certification alone.

== Release history ==
Country	Date	Format	Label
France, Germany	1988	12" maxi	Ariola
France, Germany	1988	7" single	Ariola
France, Germany	1989	7" single	Ariola
France, Germany	1989	CD maxi	Ariola
France, Germany	1989	12" maxi	Ariola
Canada	1989	Promotional 7" single	Star Records
