= Elsa (album) =

Studio album by Elsa Lunghini
- Released: November 1988
- Recorded: 1987–1988; Artistic Palace Studio, Boulogne-Billancourt
- Genre: Pop
- Length: 41:24
- Label: BMG-Ariola
- Producers: Vincent-Marie Bouvot, Georges Lunghini

Elsa Lunghini chronology
Elsa (1988)	Rien que pour ça (1990)

Singles from Elsa
- 1. "Quelque chose dans mon cœur" Released: December 1987; 2. "Un Roman d'amitié (Friend Give Me a Reason)" Released: July 1988; 3. "Jour de neige" Released: October, 1988; 4. "À la même heure dans deux ans" Released: April 1989; 5. "Jamais nous" Released: October 1989

Elsa is the debut album of the French singer Elsa Lunghini, released in 1988.

== Background and critical reception ==
After the success of her first two singles, "T'en va pas", which peaked at #1 for eight weeks on the official singles chart (Top 50), and "Quelque chose dans mon cœur", #2 hit, Elsa decided to release her first album. In it, there are collaborations with Didier Barbelivien, Élisabeth Anaïs for texts, and her father (Georges Lunghini) for compositions. Georges also co-signed ten of the eleven songs on the album.

In the French TV program Sacrée Soirée compered by Jean-Pierre Foucault, Elsa met Glenn Medeiros, which generated the duet "Un Roman d'amitié (Friend Give Me a Reason)". It was the next single from the album. Once again, it was a success, reaching #1 on the Top 50 for six weeks during 1988 summer. Thereafter, Elsa also released three other singles on this album, which were all ranked in the top ten on the singles chart.

This debut album was very successful. In addition to the huge sales of the singles, it was certified double platinum by the SNEP, the French certifier, for more than 600,000 sales in France.

Elsa's first single, "T'en va pas", was not included in this album. The song "Nostalgia cinema" is a reference to the Italian origins of her father.

Following the huge success of the album, in December 1989 Elsa became the star of a variety show produced by Maritie and Gilbert Carpentier, entitled Elsa sous la neige, inspired by the title of her song "Jour de neige", which was one of the biggest hits on the album.

== Track listing ==
#	Title	Length
1.	"Mon Cadeau" (Didier Barbelivien / Vincent-Marie Bouvot - Georges Lunghini)	3:56
2.	"Sud-Africaine" (Pierre Grosz / Vincent-Marie Bouvot - Georges Lunghini)	3:53
3.	"Un Roman d'amitié (Friend Give Me a Reason)" (duet with Glenn Medeiros) (Diane Warren / Robbie Buchanan) French adaptation: Didier Barbelivien	4:26
4.	"Jimmy voyage" (Élisabeth Anaïs - Didier Golemanas / Vincent-Marie Bouvot - Georges Lunghini)	4:29
5.	"Le Rôle de sa vie" (Pierre Grosz / Vincent-Marie Bouvot - Georges Lunghini)	3:38
6.	"Jour de neige" (Pierre Grosz / Vincent-Marie Bouvot - Georges Lunghini)	4:02
7.	"Jamais nous" ^{1} (Didier Barbelivien / Vincent-Marie Bouvot - Georges Lunghini)	3:51
8.	"Quelque chose dans mon cœur" (Pierre Grosz / Vincent-Marie Bouvot - Georges Lunghini)	3:29
9.	"Celui qui viendra" (Didier Barbelivien / Vincent-Marie Bouvot - Georges Lunghini)	3:13
10.	"À la même heure dans deux ans" (Pierre Grosz / Raymond Donnez - Georges Lunghini)	3:29
11.	"Nostalgie cinema" (Dorine Hollier / Vincent-Marie Bouvot - Georges Lunghini)	2:49

^{1} Laurent Voulzy participated in the background vocals.

== Album credits ==
=== Personnel ===
- Claude Salmiéri - drums
- Yves Sanna - drums
- Kamil Rustam - guitar
- Bernard Paganotti - bass guitar
- Jannick Top - bass guitar
- Michel Gaucher - saxophone
- Vincent-Marie Bouvot - keyboards
- Raymond Donnez - keyboards
- Catherine Bonnevay - backing vocals ("Mon cadeau" & "Celui qui viendra")
- Francine Chantereau - backing vocals ("Mon cadeau" & "Celui qui viendra")

=== Production ===
- Arrangement - Vincent-Marie Bouvot, Raymond Donnez
- Produced by Vincent-Marie Bouvot & Georges Lunghini
- Engineered by Bruno Lambert, Jean Lamoot & Hervé Le Coz
- Assistant engineer - Manuela
- Mixed by Bruno Lambert
- Mixed by Claude Grillis ("Mon cadeau", "Jimmy voyage", "Le rôle de sa vie" & "Celui qui viendra")

=== Design ===
- Georges Lunghini - photography
- Claude Caudron - cover design

== Charts ==
=== Weekly charts ===
Chart (1988–89)	Peak position
French Albums Chart	6

=== Year-end charts ===
Chart (1989)	Rank
European Albums (European Top 100 Albums)	74
French Albums (SNEP)	4

== Certifications ==
Country	Certification	Date	Sales certified
France	2 x Platinum	1993	600,000
