= Sandy Stevens =

Sandy
- Also known as: Sandy Stevens
- Born: Sandy Stevenson
- Origin: United Kingdom
- Genres: Pop music
- Occupation: Singer
- Years active: 1982–1989

Sandy or Sandy Stevens (née Sandy Stevenson) is a British singer.

== Biography ==
Stevens released several singles during the early 1980s under her birth name, Sandy Stevenson. Later, she appeared on the French music scene as Sandy Stevens or just Sandy in 1988, with her single "J'ai faim de toi", from the album Histoires d'amour. The song was composed by Pascal Stive and Anne Moustrou, and produced by Marc Miller.

The song, originally intended for a TV advert for yoghurt, was released in May 1988 and topped the Top 50 (French SNEP Singles Chart) for two weeks, from 2 to 9 July 1988. The single was certified Gold disc by the SNEP and remained one of the biggest hit of 1988. Stevens was the first British artist to reach No.1 in France.

== Discography ==
=== Singles ===
- 1980s: "Marguerite"
- 1980s: "T'aurais dû"
- 1983: "Sandy" (soundtrack from the film of the same name)
- 1984: "Everyman's the Same"
- 1986: "Love Is Danger"
- 1988: "J'ai faim de toi" – No. 1 in France, Gold disc
- 1988: "Lies"
- 1988: "Comme je respire"

=== Collaborations ===
- 1988: Les Enfants sans Noël (compilation)
- 1988: 75 Artistes pour le Liban (compilation)
- 1989: Les Enfants sans Noël (compilation)

Preceded by "N'importe quoi" by Florent Pagny	French SNEP number one single 2 July 1988 – 9 July 1988 (2 weeks)	Succeeded by "Nuit de folie" by Début de Soirée
