= Wee Rule =

1988 single by Wee Papa Girl Rappers

Single by Wee Papa Girl Rappers

from the album The Beat, the Rhyme, the Noise
- B-side: "Rebel Rap"
- Released: 1988
- Genre: Reggae fusion, hip hop, dancehall
- Length: 4:59
- Label: Jive
- Songwriters: Charles Cochrane, Hamish MacDonald
- Producer: Hamish MacDonald

Wee Papa Girl Rappers singles chronology
"Heat It Up" (1988)	"Wee Rule" (1988)	"Soulmate" (1988)

"Wee Rule" is a song by British hip hop duo Wee Papa Girl Rappers. Released in 1988 as the third single from their debut album The Beat, the Rhyme, the Noise, the song was a top 20 hit in at least nine countries, making it the duo's biggest and best known hit song.

== Track listing ==
UK 12" single

A. "Wee Rule" (Ragamuffin Mix) - 4:59
B. "Rebel Rap" - 3:07

UK 7" single

A. "Wee Rule" - 3:26
B. "Rebel Rap" - 3:31

== Charts ==
=== Weekly charts ===
Chart (1988)	Peak position
Austria (Ö3 Austria Top 40)	12
Belgium (Ultratop 50 Flanders)	1
Finland (Suomen virallinen lista)	19
Ireland (IRMA)	4
Italy (Musica e dischi)	22
Netherlands (Dutch Top 40)	2
Netherlands (Single Top 100)	2
New Zealand (Recorded Music NZ)	17
Switzerland (Schweizer Hitparade)	4
Sweden (Sverigetopplistan)	13
UK Singles (OCC)	6
West Germany (GfK)	10

=== Year-end charts ===
Chart (1988)	Position
Belgium (Ultratop 50 Flanders)	25
Netherlands (Dutch Top 40)	17
Netherlands (Single Top 100)	26
UK Singles (OCC)	70

Chart (1989)	Position
West Germany (Media Control)	75
