= The Woman of My Life =

- Theatrical release poster
- Directed by: Régis Wargnier
- Written by: Catherine Cohen; Alain Le Henry
- Produced by: Yannick Bernard; Eberhard Junkersdorf; Hans Prescher
- Starring: Christophe Malavoy; Jane Birkin; Jean-Louis Trintignant; Béatrice Agenin
- Cinematography: François Catonné
- Edited by: Noëlle Boisson
- Music by: Romano Musumarra
- Distributed by: UGC Distribution
- Release date: 8 October 1986
- Running time: 102 minutes
- Country: France
- Language: French

The Woman of My Life (French: La Femme de ma vie) is a 1986 French film by Régis Wargnier.

== Plot ==
Simon is a famous violinist who became a drunkard. His wife Laura created seven years earlier a classical orchestra of which he was one of the three pillars. After an attack of delirium tremens, he meets Pierre, a former alcoholic, who was able to overcome his habit, and who decides to help Simon. This would change his relationship with Laura, who has always tried in vain to save Simon from his addiction, and is resentful of a stranger's success. She becomes deeply jealous, and unconsciously starts to do everything to get Simon back into alcoholism.

== Cast ==
- Christophe Malavoy as Simon
- Jane Birkin as Laura
- Jean-Louis Trintignant as Pierre
- Béatrice Agenin as Marion
- Andrzej Seweryn as Bernard
- Didier Sandre as Xavier
- Dominique Blanc as Sylvia
- Jacques Mercier as Jacques, conductor of the Orchestre National d'Ile de France
- Elsa Lunghini as Eloise (Elsa)
- Florent Pagny as Serge
- Nada Strancar as Nathalie
- Jeremy Paris as Stephen
- Gregory Bismuth as Benoit

== Accolades ==
With La Femme de ma vie director Régis Wargnier won the 1987 César Award for Best Debut.

== Soundtrack ==
T'en va pas, a duet by Jane Birkin and Elsa Lunghini written for a scene in the film song, was re-recorded in a discography version that would become the first major success of the singer Elsa, who at the time was 13 years old.
