= Wee Papa Girl Rappers =

British rap duo

- Origin: London, England
- Genres: Hip hop, reggae, hip house
- Instrument: Vocals
- Years active: 1987–1994
- Label: Jive Records
- Past members: Sandra Lawrence; Samantha Lawrence

Wee Papa Girl Rappers were a British female rap duo, that found chart success in the late 1980s. They were sisters Sandra (the elder of the two, aka Total S) and Samantha Lawrence (aka TY Tim).

Before being signed to Jive Records, the two sisters were backing singers for Feargal Sharkey. As the Wee Papa Girl Rappers, they started to appear on the BBC Radio London rap show, hosted by Dave Pearce. Their first record, "Heat it Up" featuring 2 Men and a Drum Machine, reached number 21 on the UK Singles Chart in June 1988. The Wee Papa Girls Rappers are best remembered for the single "Wee Rule" – more inspired by reggae and dancehall than hip hop – which reached number 6 on the UK Singles Chart in October 1988.

They released two albums on Jive, The Beat, the Rhyme, the Noise in 1988, and Be Aware in 1990 (the latter featuring the club hit "Get In The Groove"). They released two further singles in 1992 and 1994, as the Wee Papas.

The duo got their name "Wee Papa" from the Saint Lucia French Creole expression "Oui Papa", which their father (originating from the Caribbean Island), frequently uttered.

Samantha Lawrence died on 1 December 2024, aged 55.

== Discography ==
=== Studio albums ===
List of studio albums, with selected chart positions
Title	Album details	Peak chart positions	
Title	Album details	UK	NZ
The Beat, the Rhyme, the Noise	Released: 1988; Label: Profile; Formats: CD, LP, Cassette	39	39
Be Aware	Released: 1990; Label: Profile; Formats: CD, LP, Cassette	—	—
"—" denotes a recording that did not chart or was not released in that territory.

=== Singles ===
Year	Single	Peak positions									Album
Year	Single	UK	IRE	NED	BEL (FLA)	GER	AUT	SWI	SWE	NZ	Album
1987	"Rock the Clock"	161	—	—	—	—	—	—	—	—	Single only
1988	"Faith"	60	—	11	14	—	—	—	—	—	The Beat, the Rhyme, the Noise
1988	"Heat It Up" (featuring 2 Men and a Drum Machine)	21	—	15	28	—	—	—	—	—	The Beat, the Rhyme, the Noise
1988	"Wee Rule"	6	4	2	1	10	12	4	13	17	The Beat, the Rhyme, the Noise
1988	"Soulmate"	45	—	25	30	—	—	—	—	—	The Beat, the Rhyme, the Noise
1989	"Blow the House Down"	65	—	—	—	—	—	—	—	—	The Beat, the Rhyme, the Noise
1990	"Get in the Groove"	111	—	27	—	—	—	24	—	—	Be Aware
1990	"The Bump"	125	—	—	—	—	—	—	—	—	Be Aware
1991	"Best of My Love"	111	—	—	—	—	—	—	—	—	Be Aware
1992	"Wee Are the Girls" (as The Wee Papas)	122	—	—	—	—	—	—	—	—	Singles only
1994	"Wherever You Go" (as The Wee Papas)	—	—	—	—	—	—	—	—	—	Singles only
"—" denotes releases that did not chart or were not released.
