= Un roman d'amitié (Friend You Give Me a Reason) =

"Un Roman d'amitié (Friend You Give Me a Reason)"

Single by Elsa Lunghini and Glenn Medeiros

from the album Elsa
- B-side: "Instrumental"
- Released: 1988
- Genre: Pop
- Length: 4:20
- Label: Mercury
- Songwriter(s): Robbie Buchanan, Diane Warren, Didier Barbelivien
- Producer(s): Robbie Buchanan

Elsa Lunghini singles chronology
"Quelque chose dans mon cœur" (1987)	"Un Roman d'amitié (Friend You Give Me a Reason)" (1988)	"Jour de neige" (1988)

Glenn Medeiros singles chronology
"Lonely Won't Leave Me Alone" (1988)	"Un Roman d'amitié (Friend You Give Me a Reason)" (1988)	"Never Get Enough of You" (1989)

"Un Roman d'amitié (Friend You Give Me a Reason)" is a 1988 song recorded by the French artist Elsa Lunghini and the American artist Glenn Medeiros. The song was released as a single in the summer of 1988 and features on the self-titled LP Elsa.

== Background ==
In 1988, Elsa was invited to a French TV programme to perform her second single, "Quelque chose dans mon cœur". Jean-Pierre Foucault, the host of the show, made her the surprise to invite Glenn Medeiros of whom Elsa was a fan. The two singers got on and finally decided to record two songs together: "Love Always Finds a Reason", written by Diane Warren, which was recorded in full in English-language and added on Glenn Medeiros' album, and "Un Roman d'amitié", whose complete title is actually "Un Roman d'amitié (Friend You Give Me a Reason)", as it appears on the single's cover. Medeiros explained why the song had been retitled in French, dealing with friendship while the original version was about love: "Elsa and I don't want our fans to think that we're really going together. It's just a good friendship. Though she is one of the nicest girls I've ever, ever met".

This bilingual song mixes English and French lyrics. The text and the music were composed by Robbie Buchanan, Diane Warren and Didier Barbelivien. The music video was entirely shot in Los Angeles by Maxime Ruiz. It starts with a view at night on the town, then we see the singers strolling the streets of the city on foot or by bike cross. Both singers promoted the song in the world, even in the Netherlands. Glenn Medeiros re-recorded the song in a full English version with Ria Brieffies who performed the song with him in the United States. While the Franco-English version is about friendship, the full English version speaks of love. Elsa sang live at her concert at the Olympia in 1990 and during the next tour, but Glenn Medeiros was replaced by Roger Secco.

== Chart performance ==
"Un Roman d'amitié" achieved a huge success in France where it debuted at number eight on the chart edition of 23 July 1988 and reached number two, two weeks later, being blocked at this position for weeks by the summer hit "Nuit de folie" by Début de Soirée; then it managed to top the chart for consecutive six weeks, and remained on the chart (top 50) for 25 weeks. It was certified Gold disc by the Syndicat National de l'Édition Phonographique. In Belgium (Flanders), it was number one for two weeks, in alternance with "Nuit de folie", and appeared in the top three for eight weeks. On the European Hot 100 Singles, it started at number 21 on 6 August 1988, peaked at number five in its ninth week, and remained in the top ten for 12 weeks, and in the top 100 for 21 weeks.

== Track listings ==
- 7" single
1. "Un Roman d'amitié (Friend You Give Me a Reason)" — 4:20
2. "You're My Woman, You're My Lady" (instrumental) — 3:39
- CD single
1. "Un Roman d'amitié (Friend You Give Me a Reason)" — 5:25
2. "Un Roman d'amitié (Friend You Give Me a Reason)" (instrumental) — 4:20
3. "You're My Woman, You're My Lady" (instrumental) — 3:39
4. "Pieces of My Dreams" - by Glenn Meideiros
- 7" single - English version
1. "Love Always Finds a Reason" — 4:20
2. "Pieces of My Dreams" (by Glenn Medeiros) — 4:01

== Charts ==
=== Weekly charts ===
Chart (1988)	Peak position
Belgium (Ultratop 50 Flanders)	9
Belgium (Ultratop 50 Wallonia)	1
Europe (European Hot 100)	5
France (SNEP)	1
Quebec (ADISQ)	9

Chart (1989) ^{1}	Peak position
Belgium (Ultratop 50 Flanders)	31
Netherlands (Single Top 100)	12

^{1} Version by Glenn Medeiros & Ria, "Love Always Finds a Reason"

=== Year-end charts ===
Chart (1988)	Peak position
Belgian (Flanders) Singles Chart	93
Europe (European Hot 100)	21

== Certifications ==
Certifications for "Un Roman d'amitié"
Region	Certification	Certified units/sales
France (SNEP)	Gold	500,000^{*}
^{*} Sales figures based on certification alone.

== See also ==
- List of number-one singles of 1988 (France)
