= Rien que pour ça =

Rien que pour ça...

Studio album by Elsa Lunghini
- Released: 3 September 1990
- Recorded: May–July 1990; Master Rock Studios, London
- Genre: Pop
- Length: 47:05
- Labels: Ariola, BMG, Neige Music
- Producers: Gus Dudgeon; Georges Lunghini (exec.)

Elsa Lunghini chronology
Elsa (1988)	Rien que pour ça... (1990)	Douce violence (1992)

Singles from Rien que pour ça...
- 1. "Rien que pour ça..." Released: September 1990; 2. "Pleure doucement" Released: January 1991; 3. "Qu'est-ce que ça peut lui faire ?" Released: June 1991

Rien que pour ça... is the second album by the French singer Elsa Lunghini and was released in 1990.
NB. Sound quality: ADD.

== Background and critical reception ==
In this album, recorded in London, Elsa continued her musical collaboration with her father, Georges Lunghini, since he was co-producer of the album and composed all the tracks with Vincent-Marie Bouvot, except the eponymous title, which was composed by Elsa herself.

For the texts, Elsa was surrounded by famous lyricists : Gérard Presgurvic and Thierry Séchan, Renaud's brother.

This album confirmed the success of Elsa to the public : indeed, in addition to being certified double Gold by the SNEP, it allowed her to go on stage for the first time. Indeed, she climbed on Olympia stage, Paris, in October 1990 to perform songs from her first two albums.

In 1991, "Je s'rai là" was released as the fourth single from the album, but as a promotional CD in Canada only.

== Track listing ==
#	Title	Length
1.	"Je viens vers toi" (Thierry Séchan / Vincent-Marie Bouvot – Georges Lunghini)	3:25
2.	"Pleure doucement" (Thierry Séchan / Vincent-Marie Bouvot – Georges Lunghini)	3:59
3.	"Faudrait pas croire" (Gérard Presgurvic / Vincent-Marie Bouvot – Georges Lunghini)	3:05
4.	"Qu'est-ce que ça peut lui faire ?" (Gérard Presgurvic / Vincent-Marie Bouvot – Georges Lunghini)	3:20
5.	"On verra bien demain" (Gérard Presgurvic / Vincent-Marie Bouvot – Georges Lunghini)	4:05
6.	"Un Enfant qui s'en va" (Gérard Presgurvic / Vincent-Marie Bouvot – Georges Lunghini)	4:30
7.	"L'Amour sur le fil" (Gérard Presgurvic / Vincent-Marie Bouvot – Georges Lunghini)	4:30
8.	"Parler" (Gérard Presgurvic / Vincent-Marie Bouvot – Georges Lunghini)	4:20
9.	"Rien que pour ça..." (Gérard Presgurvic / Elsa)	2:45
10.	"Je s'rai là" (Gérard Presgurvic / Vincent-Marie Bouvot – Georges Lunghini)	3:20
11.	"Pour qui tu cours ?" ^{1} (Gérard Presgurvic / Vincent-Marie Bouvot – Georges Lunghini)	4:25
11.	"Bats-toi" (Thierry Séchan / Vincent-Marie Bouvot – Georges Lunghini)	4:35

^{1} Only on CD and cassette versions of the album.

== Album credits ==
=== Personnel ===
- Richard Cottle – keyboards, orchestration & saxophone
- "Wide" Al Hodge – guitar
- Paul Westwood – bass guitar
- Dave Mattacks – drums
- Jimmy Chambers – backing vocals
- Katie Kissoon – backing vocals
- Elsa – backing vocals
- Pete Wingfield – backing vocals

=== Production ===
- Arrangement: Richard Cottle, Gus Dudgeon
- Produced by Gus Dudgeon for RockMasters
- Engineered by Helen Woodward
- Assistant engineer: John McDonnell
- Mixed by Gus Dudgeon & Helen Woodward
- Executive producer: Georges Lunghini

=== Design ===
- Michel Figuet – photography
- François-René Richez – cover design

== Charts, certifications and sales ==
Chart (1990)	Peak position
French Albums Chart	3

Country	Certification	Date	Sales certified
France	2 x Gold	1990	200,000
