= Douce violence (album) =

Studio album by Elsa Lunghini
- Released: 16 September 1992
- Recorded: 1992
- Genre: Pop
- Length: 42:12
- Labels: BMG-Ariola, Neige Music
- Producers: Raymond Donnez, Georges Lunghini

Elsa Lunghini chronology
| Rien que pour ça (1990) | Douce violence (1992) | Chaque jour est un long chemin (1996) |

Singles from Douce Violence
- 1. "Bouscule-moi " Released: September 1992; 2. "Supplice chinois (toop toop) " Released: January 1993; 3. "Tout l'temps, tout l'temps" Released: May 1993

Douce violence is the third album of the French singer Elsa Lunghini, and it was released in 1992.

== Background and critical reception ==
In this album, when she was only 19, she began to disassociate herself from his father, the composer Georges Lunghini. Understanding her phobias, he wrote songs including "Bouscule-moi" or "Tout l'temps, tout l'temps." There are also four songs written by Jean-Loup Dabadie.

This album met with less success than previous ones, although it was certified Gold, and marked the singer's change of look : indeed, she appeared more adult with a very short cut.

The singles from this album were less successful than the previous one : "Bouscule-moi" was the only one that reached the French Singles Chart, but it failed to enter the top ten (#14).

== Track listing ==
| # | Title | Length |
|---|---|---|
| 1. | "Supplice chinois (toop toop)" (Jacques Duvall / Georges Lunghini) | 4:14 |
| 2. | "C'est bien, c'est mal" (Jean-Loup Dabadie / Raymond Donnez - Georges Lunghini) | 3:34 |
| 3. | "Être ensemble" (Jean-Loup Dabadie / Georges Lunghini) | 3:50 |
| 4. | "Jamais toujours" (Jacques Duvall / Raymond Donnez - Georges Lunghini) | 4:07 |
| 5. | "Mercurochrome" (Jacques Duvall / Georges Lunghini) | 4:23 |
| 6. | "Bouscule-moi" (Jacques Duvall / Raymond Donnez - Georges Lunghini) | 3:30 |
| 7. | "Le cœur ailleurs, l'amour ailleurs" (Jean-Loup Dabadie / Raymond Donnez - Georges Lunghini) | 3:49 |
| 8. | "Parfums d'amour" (Jacques Duvall / Georges Lunghini) | 4:10 |
| 9. | "Amoureuse, moi ?" (Jacques Duvall / Raymond Donnez - Georges Lunghini) | 4:10 |
| 10. | "Tout le temps, tout le temps" (Jean-Loup Dabadie / Raymond Donnez - Georges Lunghini) | 2:45 |
| 11. | "Changer sa vie" (Gérard Presgurvic / Vincent-Marie Bouvot - Georges Lunghini) | 3:40 |

== Album credits ==
=== Personnel ===
- Raymond Donnez - programming
- Celmar Engel - synthesizer
- Claude Salmiéri - drums
- Roger Secco - drums
- Denis Benarrosh - percussion
- Bernard Paganotti - bass guitar
- Jannick Top - bass guitar
- Gérard Bikialo - piano
- Michel-Yves Kochmann - guitar
- Basile Leroux - guitar
- Patrice Tison - guitar
- Elsa - backing vocals

=== Production ===
- Arranged by Raymond Donnez
- Produced by Raymond Donnez & Georges Lunghini
- Engineered by Didier Bader & Bruno Lambert
- Mixed by Bruno Lambert at Studio Marcadet, Paris
  - Amoureuse, moi ? mixed by Andy Scott

=== Design ===
- Jean-Daniel Lorieux - photography
- ★ Bronx - design

== Charts, certifications and sales ==
=== Certifications and sales ===
| Region | Certification | Certified units/sales |
|---|---|---|
| France (SNEP) | Gold | 100,000^{*} |
^{*} Sales figures based on certification alone.

| Chart (1992) | Peak position |
|---|---|
| French Albums Chart | 5 |
