= Jour de neige =

1988 single by Elsa Lunghini

Single by Elsa Lunghini

from the album Elsa
- B-side: "Instrumental"
- Released: November 1988
- Recorded: 1988; Artistic Palace Studio, Boulogne-Billancourt
- Genre: Pop
- Length: 4:00
- Label: Ariola
- Songwriters: Pierre Grosz (lyrics); Vincent-Marie Bouvot, Georges Lunghini (music)
- Producers: Vincent-Marie Bouvot, Georges Lunghini

Elsa Lunghini singles chronology
"Un roman d'amitié (Friend You Give Me a Reason)" (1988)	"Jour de neige" (1988)	"À la même heure dans deux ans" (1989)

"Jour de neige" is a 1988 song recorded by French singer Elsa Lunghini. Written by Pierre Grosz with a music composed by Vincent-Marie Bouvot and Georges Lunghini, it was released in November 1988 as the third single from her debut album Elsa. As for the previous three singles, it had a great success in France, reaching number two. Two years later, it was released in Italy and Spain in the languages of these countries.

== Background ==
As for the other songs from Elsa's debut album, the lyrics were written by Pierre Grosz. The music was composed by Vincent-Marie Bouvot and Georges Lunghini, the singer's father.

The song was also recorded in Italian ("Gli anni miei") and Spanish ("Solo era un sueno"). All these versions are available on 1997 Elsa's best of Elsa, l'essentiel 1986-1993. Two remixed and extended versions, as well as two instrumental versions, feature on the various formats. The megamix club version is also available on the CD maxi for "Quelque chose dans mon cœur".

== Video and performances ==
As the title suggests, the text is about the snow and the enjoyments that it brings. The music video was shot in the snow and the strict secondary school "Les Chassagnes", in Oullins, France, and was directed by Bernard Schmitt.

Elsa sang it live during her concert at the Olympia in 1990 and during the next concert. She also sang during her concert at the Bataclan in 1997. During the preparation of her concert at the European in 2005, the song was scheduled but, as it did not comply with the setlist, it was withdrawn.

== Chart performances ==
In France, "Jour de neige" was successful, debuting straight to number 12 on the chart edition of 26 November 1988, and entered the top ten two weeks later, stayed there for 14 consecutive weeks, peaking at number two for two non-consecutive weeks, first behind Mylène Farmer's chart topper "Pourvu qu'elles soient douces", and then David Hallyday's "High". It fell off the top 50 after 20 weeks, which was then Elsa's shortest single chart run in France. Therefore, Elsa's first four singles reached number one or number two on the chart. In 1989, the single achieved Gold disc status by the Syndicat National de l'Édition Phonographique. On the European Hot 100 Singles, it debuted at number 45 on 10 December 1988 and reached a peak of number nine on 28 January 1988. It peaked at number 32 on the European Airplay Top 50 where it charted for five weeks.

== Track listings ==
- 7" single
1. "Jour de neige" — 3:59
2. "Jour de neige" (instrumental) — 3:59
- 12" maxi
1. "Jour de neige" (megamix club) — 8:02
2. "Jour de neige" (remix extended version) — 4:49
3. "Jour de neige" (remix instrumental version) — 4:32
- CD maxi
1. "Jour de neige" (megamix club) — 8:02
2. "Quelque chose dans mon cœur" — 3:30
3. "Jour de neige" (remix version longue) — 4:49
- 7" single - Promo - Canada
1. "Jour de neige" — 4:00
- 7" single - Italy
1. "Gli anni miei" — 4:00
2. "Jamais nous" — 3:54
- 7" single - Spain
1. "Solo era un sueño (Jour de neige)" — 4:00
2. "Jour de neige" — 4:00

== Credits ==
- Jean-Philippe Bonichon - mixing
- Vincent-Marie Bouvot - arranger, producer
- Claude Caudron - design
- Dimitri - remix
- Raymond Donnez - arranger
- Bruno Fourrier - assistant mixing
- Bruno Lambert - engineer
- Georges Lunghini - producer
- Nicolas Neidhardt - piano (megamix club)
- Mixed at Studio Marcadet, Paris

== Charts ==
=== Weekly charts ===
Chart (1988–1989)	Peak position
Europe (European Airplay Top 50)	32
Europe (European Hot 100)	9
France (SNEP)	2
Quebec (ADISQ)	13

=== Year-end charts ===
Chart (1989)	Peak position
Europe (Eurochart Hot 100)	74

== Certifications ==
Certifications for "Jour de neige"
Region	Certification	Certified units/sales
France (SNEP)	Gold	400,000^{*}
^{*} Sales figures based on certification alone.

== Release history ==
Country	Date	Format	Label
France	1988	CD maxi	Ariola
France	1988	7" single	Ariola
France	1988	12" maxi	Ariola
Canada	1988	Promotional 7" single	Star Records
Italy	1990	7" single	BMG Ariola
Spain	1990	7" single	BMG Ariola
