= Quelque chose dans mon cœur =

Single by Elsa Lunghini

from the album Elsa
- B-side: "Instrumental"
- Released: December 1987
- Recorded: 1987
- Genre: Pop
- Length: 3:42
- Label: BMG-Ariola
- Songwriters: Pierre Grosz (lyrics); Vincent-Marie Bouvot, Georges Lunghini (music)
- Producers: Vincent-Marie Bouvot, Georges Lunghini

Elsa Lunghini singles chronology
"T'en va pas" (1986)	"Quelque chose dans mon cœur" (1987)	"Un Roman d'amitié" (1988)

"Quelque chose dans mon cœur" (French: [kɛlkə ʃoz dɑ̃ mɔ̃ kœʁ]; "Something in My Heart") is a 1987 song recorded by the French artist Elsa Lunghini. Written by Pierre Grosz with a music composed by Vincent-Marie Bouvot and Georges Lunghini, Elsa's father, who also composed all the songs from her debut album, it was released in December 1987 as the first single from her debut album Elsa. It achieved a great success in France, reaching number two.

== Lyrics ==
In the second couplet of "Quelque chose dans mon cœur", Elsa mentions the actress Ava Gardner of whom she was fascinated. With "a lot of accuracy and sensibility", the song deals with "the critical passage from childhood to adolescence", torn between the desire to become an adult and the fear of the unknown. The relationships with the parents and the friends are also evoked.

== Music video ==
Directed by Veronique Mucret, the music video begins in a girl's room, then illustrates the theme of childhood with images of Elsa when she was a little girl, then she walks down a hallway in which each doors overlooks on ideals for the future. The singer appears sometimes as a princess, sometimes as a relaxed teenager, sometimes as a femme fatale.

== Critical reception ==
A review in Pan-European magazine Music & Media stated that "Quelque chose dans mon cœur" "couples a romantic mainstream production to Elsa's timid and infatuated vocals. A good bet for crossover to the Benelux markets".

== Live performances ==
The version of the first 7" appears on the album Elsa and the mini CD maxi for "Jour de neige". The remix version appears on the singer's compilation. As Elsa performed the song at every of her concert tours, it also appears on the live CD and DVD Live Connection.

== Chart performances ==
In France, "Quelque chose dans mon cœur" was as successful as Elsa's previous single, "T'en va pas", but did not top the chart, being blocked by Sabrina Salerno's "Boys (Summertime Love)" which was number one then. It debuted at number 46 on the French Single Chart on the edition of 19 December 1987, reached the top ten five weeks later and stayed there for 11 weeks, peaking at number two on 27 February 1988, and fell off the top 50 after 24 weeks. In 1988, the single was certified Gold disc by the Syndicat National de l'Édition Phonographique, the French certifier, for 500,000 units. On the European Hot 100 Singles, it started at number 82 on 9 January 1988, peaked at number seven it is ninth week, and remained on the chart for a total of 21 weeks, nine of them in the top 20.

== Track listings ==
- 7" single - France, Japan
1. "Quelque chose dans mon cœur" — 3:42
2. "Quelque chose dans mon cœur" (instrumental) — 3:42
- 7" single - Canada
1. "Quelque chose dans mon cœur" — 3:50
2. "Quelque chose dans mon cœur" (instrumental) — 4:20
- 12" maxi
1. "Quelque chose dans mon cœur" (extended version) — 5:55
2. "Quelque chose dans mon cœur" (instrumental) — 4:50

== Charts ==
=== Weekly charts ===
Chart (1987–1988)	Peak position
Europe (European Hot 100)	7
France (SNEP)	2
Quebec (ADISQ)	30

=== Year-end charts ===
Chart (1988)	Position
Europe (European Hot 100)	57

== Certifications ==
Certifications for "Quelque chose dans mon cœur"
Region	Certification	Certified units/sales
France (SNEP)	Gold	500,000^{*}
^{*} Sales figures based on certification alone.
