= T'en va pas =

Single by Elsa Lunghini

from the album La Femme de ma vie soundtrack
- B-side: "Instrumental"
- Released: 12 October 1986
- Recorded: 1986; Titania Studios, Rome
- Genre: Pop
- Length: 3:50 (single version); 5:32 (album version)
- Label: Carrere
- Songwriter(s): Catherine Cohen, Régis Wargnier (lyrics); Romano Musumarra (music); Carol Welsman (English version)
- Producer(s): Romano Musumarra

Elsa Lunghini singles chronology
"T'en va pas" (1986)	"Quelque chose dans mon cœur" (1988)

"T'en va pas" (Eng. "Don't Go Away") is a 1986 song recorded by the French artist Elsa Lunghini. Released as a single on 12 October 1986, this song, her debut single, was the soundtrack of the 1986 movie La Femme de ma vie. It was a smash hit in France.

== Background ==
In the movie, Elsa portrayed Jane Birkin's daughter and played the piano in a short scene. Finally, a whole song had been composed by Romano Musumarra, who decided to release it as a single. Musumarra had already worked and helped produce hits for two famous French artists of the 80s—Jeanne Mas ("En Rouge et Noir") and Princess Stephanie of Monaco ("Ouragan").

"T'en va pas" was a huge hit in France, and managed to export itself across Europe with an English recording : "Papa, Please Don't Go". It became well known in Japan because it was used for Jeans' TV commercial there. Also in Japan, Tite Kubo used the song as the image song for the character Orihime Inoue from Bleach. It also was used as the image song for the character Yumisuka Satsuki from Tsukihime. In 2008 the song was used in television commercials for Impulse brand deodorant, in Argentina. The song was available in the French and English languages on the best of Elsa, l'essentiel 1986-1993.

The music video shows images from the movie alternating with Elsa performing the song.

In the mid-2000s, the song was covered in a live version by Priscilla on the TV show Absolument 80 broadcast on M6.

== Chart performance ==
"T'en va pas" had a huge success in France. It debuted at number 26 on the chart edition of 6 December 1986 and reached the top ten the week after. In the fifth week, it topped the chart and there stayed for eight consecutive weeks, blocking at number two Desireless' hit "Voyage, Voyage". Certified Gold disc by the Syndicat National de l'Édition Phonographique for over 500,000 copies sold, the single remained for 18 weeks in the top ten and for 25 weeks on the chart. Elsa, who was 13 years old at the time, became the youngest artist to reach number one on the French Singles Chart and thus appeared on the Guinness Book of Records; however, her record was beaten in 1993 by Jordy Lemoine. In other European countries, it reached the top three in the Walloon region of Belgium, and was a top 50 hit in the Netherlands. On the Music & Media's Eurochart Hot 100, it debuted at number 70 on 20 December 1986, reached a peak of number 17 and spent a total of 22 weeks on the chart. It also appeared for four weeks on the Eurochart Airplay Top 50 with a peak at number 37. Worldwide, the single's sales were about 1,3 million copies.

== Track listings ==
- 7" single
1. "T'en va pas" (single version) – 3:50
2. "T'en va pas" (instrumental) – 4:45
- 12" maxi
1. "T'en va pas" (remix) – 5:32
2. "T'en va pas" (instrumental) – 5:32
- 7" single - English version
1. "Papa Please Don't Go" (single version) – 4:00
2. "T'en va pas" (instrumental) – 3:50
- 12" maxi - English version
1. "Papa Please Don't Go" (remix) – 5:25
2. "Papa Please Don't Go" (instrumental) – 5:25

== Production ==
- Arrangement & producer: Romano Musumarra
- Engineered by Gianpaolo Bresciani at Titania Studios, Rome

== Charts ==
=== Weekly charts ===
Weekly chart performance for "T'en va pas"
Chart (1986–1987)	Peak position
Belgium (Ultratop 40 Wallonia)	3
Europe (European Hot 100)	17
Europe (European Airplay Top 50)	37
France (SNEP)	1
Netherlands (Dutch Top 40 Tipparade)	9
Netherlands (Single Top 100)	41
Quebec (ADISQ)	8

=== Year-end charts ===
1987 year-end chart performance for "T'en va pas"
Chart (1987)	Peak position
Europe (European Hot 100)	49
France (SNEP)	8

== Certifications ==
Certifications for "T'en va pas"
Region	Certification	Certified units/sales
France (SNEP)	Gold	500,000^{*}
^{*} Sales figures based on certification alone.

== See also ==
- List of number-one singles of 1987 (France)
