= Elsa Lunghini =

Elsa
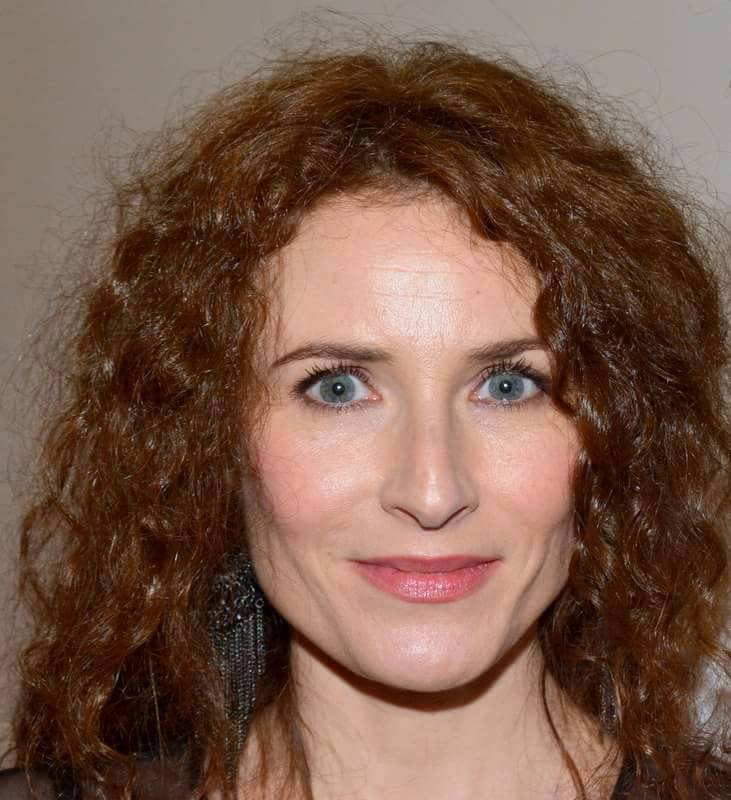

Background information
- Born: Elsa Lunghini; 20 May 1973 (age 53)
- Origin: Paris, France
- Genres: Pop music
- Occupations: Singer, songwriter, actress
- Years active: 1986–present

Elsa Lunghini (born 20 May 1973), known mononymously as Elsa, is a French singer and actress. She was a teenage pop-star in the late 1980s. In 1986, she was the youngest singer to reach number one in the French charts, with the single "T'en va pas", and she went on to sell millions of records during the decade. Elsa, her album of 1988, had achieved double-platinum status by 1993.

== Biography ==
Daughter of Georges Lunghini (actor, photographer and songwriter) and Christiane Jobert (painter and also sister of actress Marlène Jobert and Charles Jobert, a camera operator and director of photography), she is of Italian origin on her father's side and of Sephardic Jewish origin on her mother's side. She is a cousin of actresses Eva Green and Josephine Jobert.

Lunghini first performed in a movie at age seven, in 1981, in Claude Miller's Garde à vue (also starring Romy Schneider).

She was the youngest artist to be in the main program at the Olympia, at 17, in October 1990 as well as the youngest to have a number 1 hit in the Top 50 in France. At 13, in 1986, she remained number 1 for eight weeks with "T'en va pas" (soundtrack of the movie La Femme de ma vie). The song was composed by the Italian Romano Musumarra, who had worked and helped produce hits for 1980s singer Jeanne Mas. The song was a hit in France and sold elsewhere in Europe with an English recording.

With the help of her musician father, she recorded her LP Elsa. It sold more than 600,000 copies with hit singles such as "Quelque chose dans mon cœur" ("Something in my heart"), "Jour de neige" ("Snowy day"), "Jamais nous" (with backing vocals by French singer Laurent Voulzy) ("Never us"), "Un Roman d'amitié" (duet with Glenn Medeiros) ("Friend you give me a Reason"), "À la même heure dans deux ans" ("At the same time in two years"). All were top 10 hits. At that time, Lunghini was the only artist to have her first four singles at number one or two. She became popular in the teen press, often compared with Vanessa Paradis.

In 1990, she made her second album, Rien que pour ça ("Only for that"). The songs were produced by her father and Elsa wrote the music for the single of the same name. "Rien que pour ça" was a top 20 hit. Two other excerpts were released: "Pleure doucement" ("Cry softly") and "Qu'est-ce que ça peut lui faire" ("How does she matter").

In 1992, Lunghini recorded "Bouscule-moi" ("Push me on"), a mid-rock single with more adult lyrics. "Bouscule-moi" was a hit single. Her third album was Douce violence ("Sweet violence").

In 1996, aged 23, she wrote and composed her fourth album, Chaque jour est un long chemin (Every day is a long way). It sold 20,000. From 20 to 24 September 2004, she gave shows in Paris at the Européen. A live DVD and a live CD went on sale in 2006.

She has starred in two TV movies: 2002's La mort est rousse and 2004's Trois jours en juin and is involved in a television advertising campaign for Danone yoghurt.

== Discography ==
- Elsa (1988)
- Rien que pour ça (1990)
- Douce violence (1992)
- Chaque jour est un long chemin (1996)
- De lave et de sève (2004)
- Elsa Lunghini (2008)

== Filmography ==
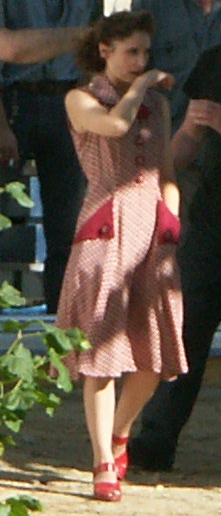
Elsa during the filming of Trois jours en juin

Cinema:

- 1981: Garde à vue (de Claude Miller) – Camille (l'enfant)
- 1985: Train d'enfer (de Roger Hanin) – (uncredited)
- 1985: Rouge baiser (de Véra Belmont) – Rosa
- 1986: La Femme de ma vie (de Régis Wargnier) – Éloïse
- 1987: Où que tu sois (de Alain Bergala) – Anne
- 1992: Le Retour de Casanova (de Édouard Niermans) – Marcolina
- 2009: Le portail (Short, by Liam Engle) – Maman
- 2013: Pauvre Richard! (by Malik Chibane) – Amel

Television:

- 2002: La Mort est rousse (TV Movie, de Christian Faure) – Charlotte
- 2005: Trois jours en juin (TV Movie, de Philippe Venault) – Sylvie
- 2007: Où es-tu ? (de Miguel Courtois) – Suzanne
- 2009: Aveugle mais pas trop (TV Movie, de Charlotte Brandström) – Emma
- 2010: La maison des Rocheville (TV, by Jacques Otmezguine) - Sylvana
