= Raymond Donnez =

French disco producer, arranger, and performer (1942–2019)

Raymond Donnez (September 9, 1942 – March 7, 2019), or Don Ray, was a French disco producer, arranger and performer.

== Early life ==
A cult hero among fans of Eurodisco, Don Ray played keyboards on Cerrone's records "Love in C Minor", "IV", "VI", and "VIII" and released one solo album, Garden of Love, which featured his successful single "Got to Have Loving", cowritten with Cerrone, who drummed on the track. He also produced Santa Esmeralda's hit cover of "Don't Let Me Be Misunderstood" and their second LP, "The House of the Rising Sun". His single "Got To Have Loving" had cross-over success on pop radio, and reached #44 in the Billboard Hot 100 in October 1978.

Also, was conductor in the Eurovision Song Contest in three years, 1974 (for the Monegasque entry "Celui qui reste et celui qui s'en va"), 1976 (for the Monegasque entry "Toi, la musique et moi") and 1977 (the winner of this year, the French "L'oiseau et l'enfant").

Don Ray was a musician with Alec Costandinos and his name appears on many of Alec's albums and jazz-funk classic singles "Standing in the Rain" and the slower "My Desire". The disco stomper "Midnight Madness" is only available on UK 12inch.

Donnez died at the age of 76 on 7 March, 2019.

== Albums ==
The Garden Of Love (1978)
