= Jeanne Mas discography =

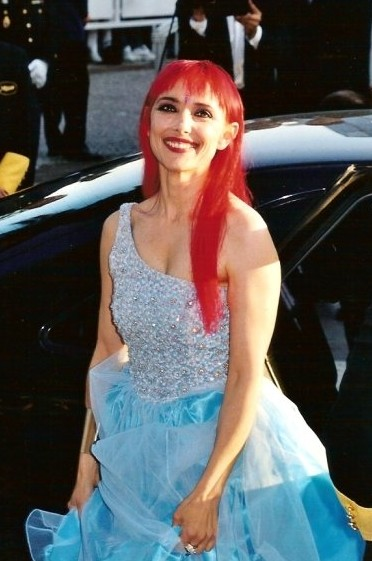
- Studio albums: 11
- Live albums: 1
- Compilation albums: 6
- Singles: 35
- Music videos: 3

This page presents the discography of the French pop singer Jeanne Mas.

== Albums ==
=== Studio albums ===
Release date	Title	Peak position	Sales	Additional information
January 1985	Jeanne Mas	N°5 in France	350 000	
April 1986	Femmes d'aujourd'hui	N°1 in France; N°13 in Belgium	1 200 000	5 Weeks Number 1 in France
February 1989	Les Crises de l'âme	N°1 in France; N°21 in Switzerland	550 000	4 Weeks Number 1 in France
October 1990	L'art des femmes	-	80 000	last album on EMI
September 1992	Au nom des rois	-	85 000	first album on AB Productions rereleased in 1993 with three bonus tracks
November 1996	Jeanne Mas & Les Égoïstes	-	20 000	first album on Arcade Music
October 2000	Désir d'insolence	-	10 000	first album on XIII Bis Records
May 2001	Je vous aime ainsi	N°150 in France	5 000	enhanced CD features the "Désir d'insolence"'s video
May 2003	Les Amants de Castille	N°90 in France	10 000	limited edition features the extra track "Cid story"
November 2006	The Missing Flowers	N°164 in France	15 000	5 different editions
May 2008	Be West	N°156 in France	2 000	first album on Edina Music
August 2009	7 Nights	-	1 000	alias LaBlonde, first album on Rock&Movies
May 2011	Bleu Citron	-	4 000	
March 2012	Made In France	-	1 000	
April 2014	H2-Eau	N°121 in France	5 000	
May 2019	Goodbye je reviendrai	N°136 in France		
March 2020	Love	N°150 in France		

=== Live albums ===
Release date	Title	Peak position	Sales
September 1987	En concert	N°12 in France; N°14 in Belgium	200.000

=== Compilations ===
Release date	Title	Peak position	Sales	Additional information
1991	Depuis la toute première fois	-	100.000	comprehensive 1984-1991 singles collection
1996	Les Plus Grands Succès de Jeanne Mas	N°8 in France; N°20 in Belgium	75.000	selective 1984-1991 songs collection with two unreleased English versions
2000	L'Essentiel	-	85.000	selective 1984-1991 songs collection
2001	J'M - Le meilleur de Jeanne Mas	-	50.000	selective 1984-1992 songs collection with two new tracks original CD release contained bonus disc of remixes, live version and acoustic medley recorded in 2001
2004	Best of	N°13 in France	65.000	selective 1984-1992 songs collection with two new remix tracks
2007	Most of the Best	-	-	selective 1992-2003 songs collection with two unreleased tracks

== Singles ==
Year	Title	Certification (France)	Peak position (France)	Weeks on chart (France)	Additional info
1978	"On the Moon"	-	-	-	
1984	"Toute Première Fois"	Gold	8	9	French chart was created on 4 November 1984
1985	"Johnny, Johnny"	Gold	1	23	Four weeks at the top
1985	"Cœur en stéréo"	-	24	16	
1986	"En Rouge et Noir"	-	1	23	Two weeks at the top
1986	"L'Enfant"	-	3	21	
1987	"Sauvez-moi"	-	3	18	
1987	"La Bête libre"	-	13	13	
1988	"Remixes"	-	-	-	
1989	"Y'a des bons..."	-	13	12	
1989	"Les Crises de l'âme"	-	-	-	Only released in Germany and Italy
1989	"J'accuse"	-	-	-	
1989	"Carolyne"	-	-	-	
1990	"Bébé rock"	-	-	-	
1990	"Shakespeare"	-	-	-	
1991	"Angela (l'art des femmes)"	-	-	-	
1992	"Au Nom des Rois"	-	-	-	
1992	"Dors bien Margot"	-	-	-	
1993	"Aime-moi"	-	-	-	
1994	"C'est pas normal"	-	-	-	
1996	"Côté H Côté clean"	-	-	-	
1997	"Anna"	-	-	-	
2000	"Désir d'insolence"	-	-	-	
2001	"Je vous aime ainsi"	-	-	-	
2003	"Chimène"	-	-	-	
2003	"Poussière de Castille"	-	-	-	
2004	"Toute Première Fois" (FDP remix)	-	96	1	1,652 sales
2005	"Johnny, Johnny" (remix)	-	-	-	
2006	"Màs alli màs alla"	-	-	-	
2006	"On a Summer Day"	-	-	-	
2006	"Un Air d'Argentine"	-	-	-	12" maxi, U.S.
2007	"C'est interdit"	-	-	-	Released under the pseudonym of "La Blonde"
2007	"Un Air d'Argentine"	-	-	-	CD maxi, France
2007	"Come to Los Angeles"	-	-	-	Released under the pseudonym of "La Blonde"
2007	"Sans toi"	-	-	-	
2008	"Be West"	-	-	-	

== Videos ==
- En concert (1987)
- Tous mes clips (1990)
- Depuis la toute première fois (1991)
