= Studio Davout =

Coordinates: 48°51′14″N 2°24′36″E

Studio Davout was a recording studio located in Paris, France. It was created in 1965 by Yves Chamberland later joined by Claude Ermelin. It was built in the 1,200 m^{2} of an old cinema, "Le Davout", which opened prior to 1946.

It was torn down in 2017, along with a few adjacent buildings to build a brand new elementary school and daycare center, which opened its doors in September 2024.

== Albums recorded at the studio ==
- Rika Zaraïm²
  - Prague (EP) (1966)
- France Gall
  - Les sucettes (EP) (1966)
- Francis Lai
  - A Man and a Woman (Soundtrack) (1966)
- Michel Legrand
  - The Young Girls of Rochefort (1967)
  - The Thomas Crown Affair (1968)
- Patrick Rondat
  - Just for Fun (1989)
  - Rape of the Earth (1991)
- Sheila
  - Adios Amor (EP) (1967)
- Brigitte Fontaine with Jean-Claude Vannier
  - Brigitte Fontaine Est...Folle (1968)
- Karlheinz Stockhausen
  - Aus den sieben Tagen (1969)
- Archie Shepp
  - Blasé (1969)
- Serge Gainsbourg
  - Cannabis (film score) (1970)
- Nico
  - Desertshore (1970)
- Ange
  - Caricatures (1972)
- Keith Jarrett
  - Staircase (1976)
- Jon and Vangelis
  - The Friends of Mr Cairo (1981)
- Art Blakey and The Jazz Messengers
  - Album of the Year (1981)
- Nina Simone
  - Fodder on My Wings (1982)
- Keith Emerson
  - 'Nighthawks' soundtrack with Opera de Paris Orchestre (1983)
- Echo & the Bunnymen
  - Ocean Rain (1984)
- Mylène Farmer
  - "Maman a tort" (7" single) (1984)
- Ozzy Osbourne
  - The Ultimate Sin (1986)
- Herbie Hancock
  - Round Midnight (Soundtrack) (1986)
- Dexter Gordon
  - The Other Side of Round Midnight (1986)
- The Colourfield
  - Deception (1987)
- Duran Duran
  - Big Thing (1988)
- Les Négresses Vertes
  - Mlah (1988)
- Les Rita Mitsouko
  - Marc & Robert (1988)
  - Re (1990)
- Stéphane Grappelli and Yo-Yo Ma
  - Anything Goes: Stephane Grappelli & Yo-Yo Ma Play (Mostly) Cole Porter (1989)
- Talking Heads
  - Naked (1988)
- Jeanne Mas
  - Les Crises de l'âme (1989)
  - L'art des femmes (1990)
- Jean-Luc Ponty
  - Tchokola (1991)
  - No Absolute Time (1993)
- Abbey Lincoln and Hank Jones
  - When There Is Love (1992)
- Khaled
  - Sahra (1996)
- Alain Bashung
  - Fantaisie militaire (1998)
- Gong
  - Shapeshifter (1991)
- Scott Walker
  - Pola X (Soundtrack) (1999)
- Jenifer
  - Jenifer (2002)
- The Skatalites
  - From Paris with Love (2002)
- Alizée
  - Mes Courants Électriques (2003)
- Stéphane Meer
  - Vice-Versa (TV show theme) (2002)
- Nolwenn Leroy
  - Histoires Naturelles (2005)
- Rinôçérôse
  - Schizophonia (2005)
- Diam's
  - Dans ma bulle (2006)
- Dee Dee Bridgewater
  - Red Earth (2007)
- Yann Tiersen
  - Tabarly (Soundtrack) (2008)
- Martin Solveig
  - C'est la Vie (2008)
- Misanthrope
  - IrremeDIABLE (2008)
- Rihanna
  - Rated R (2009)
- Bertrand Cantat, Pascal Humbert, Bernard Falaise, Alexander MacSween
  - Chœurs (2011)
- Sexion d'Assaut
  - L'Apogée (2012)
- Damien Saez
  - Miami (2013)
- Indila
  - Mini World (2014)
