= Besoin =

Studio album by Stéphanie
- Released: September 1986
- Genre: Dance-pop, synth-pop, pop rock
- Length: 63:17
- Label: Julisa, Carrere
- Producer: Yves Roze

Stéphanie chronology
Besoin (1986)	Stéphanie (1991)

Singles from Besoin
- 1. "Ouragan / Irresistible"; 2. "Flash / One Love to Give"; 3. "Fleurs du mal" 4. "Live Your Life"

Besoin (French: Need) is the debut studio album released by Princess Stéphanie of Monaco. The album was released in 1986 through Julisa and Carrere Records. The album was produced by Yves Roze, and released in some countries as Live Your Life or simply Stéphanie. Besoin reached number six at the French Albums Chart and the Swedish Albums Chart, number twelve at the German Albums Chart, and number 59 at the Austrian Albums Chart. It reportedly sold in approximately 1.5 million units, and achieved gold status in France for over 100,000 units.

== Album information ==
Preceding the release of Besoin, Stéphanie released her début single "Ouragan", which she produced herself. It reportedly sold more than 2 million copies. Stéphanie then signed a recording contract with French record labels Julisa and Carrere. The album was produced by Yves Roze. Besoin was released in September 1986, incorporating dance-pop, synthpop, dance and pop music. Despite the success of her first album, Stéphanie did not make a follow-up for five years until the release of Stéphanie in 1991.

== Singles ==
- "Ouragan" was released as the lead single from the album. The song achieved a worldwide success, topping the French Singles Chart and charting at number 11 at the Swiss Singles Chart. Its English language version "Irresistible" peaked at number two at the German Singles Chart and number five at the Austrian Singles Chart.
- "Flash" was released in 1986, charting at number four in France and number 28 in Switzerland. Its English language version "One Love to Give" reached number one in Sweden and number ten in Germany.
- "Young Ones Everywhere" was not released as an official single, but to benefit UNICEF.
- "Fleur du mal (à Paul)" was released in 1987, and charted at number 16 in France. The single version has been retitled "Fleurs du mal".
- "Live Your Life" was released in 1987 as the final single from Besoin. It peaked at number nine at the Norwegian Singles Chart.

== Track listing ==
No.	Title	Writer(s)	Producer(s)	Length
1.	"Besoin"	G. Battarel, Stéphanie, N. Roussel	Yves Roze	2:42
2.	"One Love to Give"	R. Musumarra, R. Zanelli, C. Welsman	Romano Musumarra	5:48
3.	"Rendez-Vous"	G. Blanc, M. Jouveaux, N. Roussel	Yves Roze	4:20
4.	"Young Ones Everywhere"	E. Estefan Jr., P. Osman, L. Jayne	Yves Roze	3:58
5.	"Ouragan"	R. Musumarra, M. Léono	Yves Roze	4:40
6.	"Fleur du mal (à Paul)"	R. Musumarra, R. Zanelli, C. Welsman, M. Jouveaux	Yves Roze	3:43
7.	"Live Your Life"	Phillips, Stéphanie, L. Jayne, G. Blanc	Yves Roze	4:29
8.	"Le Sega Mauricien (Remix)"	G. Blanc, M. Jouveaux, N. Roussel	Yves Roze	4:22
9.	"Flash"	R. Musumarra, R. Zanelli, M. Jouveaux	Romano Musumarra	4:20
10.	"How Can It Be"	G. Blanc, M. Jouveaux, N. Roussel	Yves Roze	5:09
11.	"Irresistible"	R. Musumarra, M. Léono	Yves Roze	4:42
12.	"I Am Waiting for You"	R. Musumarra, R. Zanelli, C. Welsman	Yves Roze	3:57
13.	"Dance with Me (Remix)"	G. Blanc, M. Jouveaux, N. Roussel	Yves Roze	5:15
14.	"One Love to Give (Remix)"	R. Musumarra, R. Zanelli, C. Welsman	Yves Roze	7:40
Total length:				62:17

== Charts ==
Chart (1986)	Peak position
Austrian Albums (Ö3 Austria Top 40)	69
Finnish Albums (Suomen virallinen lista)	7
French Albums (SNEP)	6
German Albums (Media Control Charts)	12
Swedish Albums (Sverigetopplistan)	6

=== Certifications ===
Region	Certification	Certified units/sales
France (SNEP)	Gold	100,000^{*}
^{*} Sales figures based on certification alone.
