= Théâtre des Muses =

Theatre in Monaco

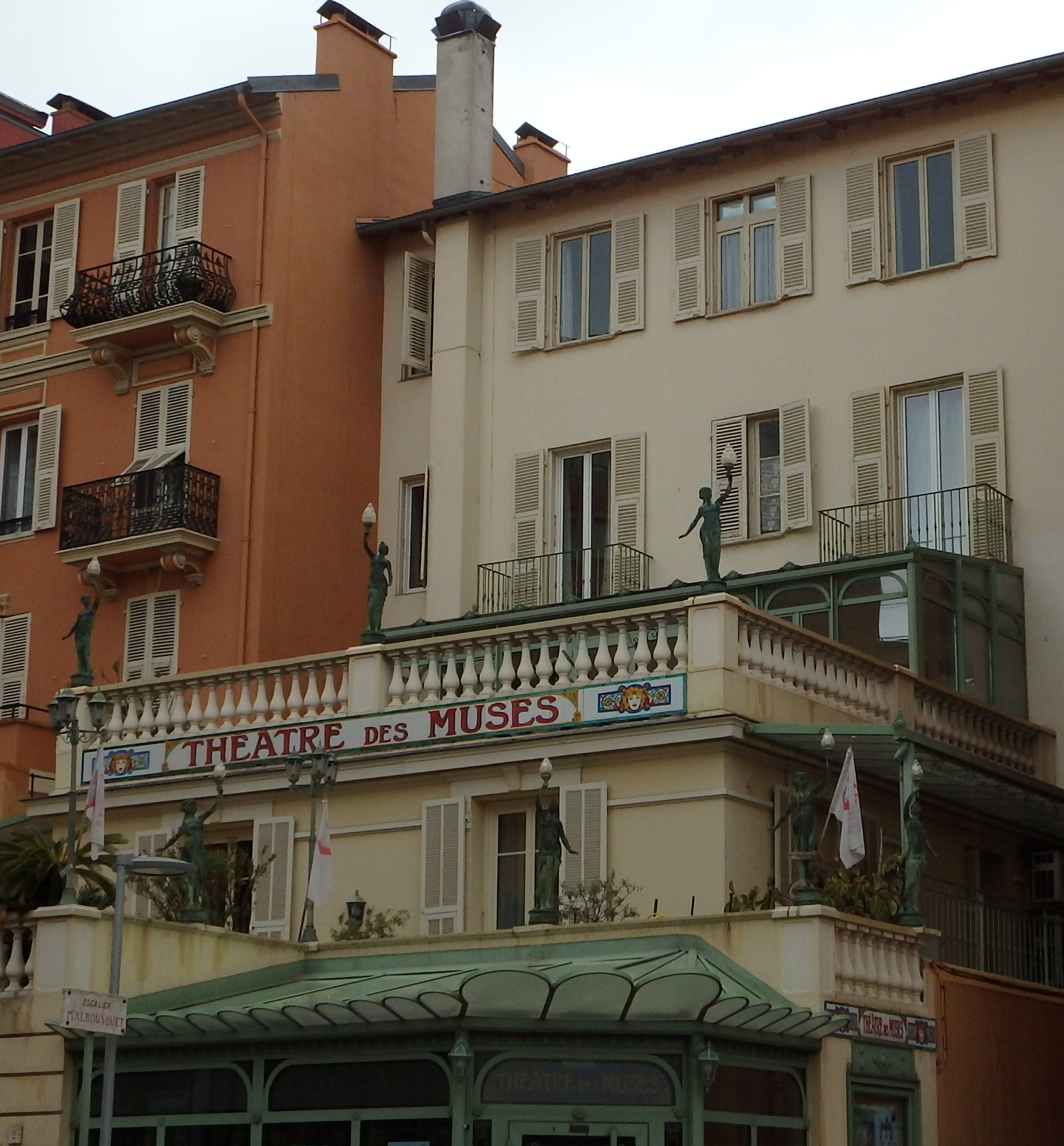
- The theatre in 2024
- Interactive map of Théâtre des Muses
- Address: 45 A Boulevard du Jardin Exotique; Monaco

Website
- letheatredesmuses.com

The Théâtre des Muses is a theatre in Monaco. It was originally a bakery before being converted into a theatre in 2012.

== Location ==
The theatre is located at 45A Boulevard du Jardin Exotique near the Jardin Exotique de Monaco, in the Moneghetti neighbourhood of Monaco.

== History ==
The building was initially a bakery, inherited by Anthéa Sogno, a Monegasque stage actress whose great-grandfather had acquired the building in 1930. Songo had been working as a theatre director in Paris, France and wished to return to the principality to be closer to her family. Sogno remodelled the bakery, which she referred to as her "great-grandmother's folly", into a theatre for three years. She did this by transforming the old baker's oven into the theatre hall. She designed it in a theatre style reminiscent of the Belle Époque. It was dedicated in 2012 as the "Théâtre des Muses" as a tribute to her mother and two sisters as well as Juliette Drouet. The theatre was formally opened by Prince Albert II, Sovereign Prince of Monaco and he made regular visits for performances. The theatre is part of the association, Les Amis du Théâtre des Muses, which was created to promote Monaco in France as well as introduce young people to theatre.

The Théâtre des Muses is completely privately funded and receives no state assistance from Monaco. Songo regularly petitions the government of Monaco for cultural funding. In 2023, it was cited to the Monégasque Department of Cultural Affairs that the Théâtre des Muses received no state subsidies despite regular attendance compared to the Théâtre Princesse Grace which was subsidised but not being as well attended.
