= En rouge et noir =

"En Rouge et Noir"

Single by Jeanne Mas

from the album Femmes d'aujourd'hui
- B-side: "Plus forte que l'océan"
- Released: 1986
- Recorded: France
- Genre: Synthpop, Hi-NRG
- Length: 4:32
- Label: EMI
- Songwriters: Jeanne Mas (lyrics), Massimo Calabrese, Piero Calabrese, Lorenzo Meinardi, Romano Musumarra (music)
- Producer: Romano Musumarra

Jeanne Mas singles chronology
"Cœur en stéréo" (1986)	"En Rouge et Noir" (1986)	"L'Enfant" (1986)

"En rouge et noir" is a song recorded by French singer Jeanne Mas, and was released in May 1986 as the first single from her second album Femmes d'aujourd'hui. It achieved a great success in France where it topped the chart, becoming probably the artist's well-known song and her signature song.

== Music video and cover versions ==
In the music video, Jeanne Mas makes up and chooses dresses in a store, and carries out a photo meeting. At the time of the chorus, the singer appears in a band film which passes through the screen.

In 2005, the song was covered by Jean-Jacques Goldman, Lorie, Gérard Jugnot and Liane Foly at the time of Les Enfoirés's tour.

== Versions ==
"En rouge et noir" is available on several Jeanne Mas's albums : for example, Femmes d'aujourd'hui, Le Meilleur de Jeanne Mas (2001), Best of (2004). There are different versions of the song: a 1983 version with a different chorus appeared on Les années chansons, published by the magazine Platine; however, being a release without the singer's agreement, it was prohibited of marketing. Two remixes were also recorded on 12", the "Special Remix 1" (available on Les plus grands succès de Jeanne Mas) and the "Spécial Remix 2" (available on limited edition of J'M – Le meilleur de Jeanne Mas). In 2006, the "Kamp house remix" was produced by DJ Esteban and is available on the first edition of album The Missing Flowers and on My 80's. "En rouge et noir" is also included in a remix version recorded by Jeanne Mas on her album My 80's Remixes and More and carried out by Roberto Zaneli.

== Chart performance ==
In France, "En rouge et noir" debuted at number 14 on 17 May 1986, reached number one seven weeks later, thus dislodging Princess Stéphanie of Monaco's "Ouragan", stayed at this position for two consecutive weeks. It spent 16 weeks in the top ten and 23 weeks in the top 50. It was certified Gold disc by the Syndicat National de l'Édition Phonographique. With "En Rouge et Noir", Jeanne Mas became the first artist to get a second number in France. On the overall Eurochart Hot 100, "En rouge et noir" started at number 59 and reached a peak of number 22 three weeks later, and fell off the chart after 21 weeks. It was also much aired on radio and spent 16 weeks on the European Airplay Top 50, with a peak at number 19 in its eleventh week.

== Track listings ==
- 12" maxi

A-side :

1. "En Rouge et Noir" (special remix 1) – 5:00

B-side :

1. "En Rouge et Noir" (special remix 2) – 5:17
- 7" single

A-side :

1. "En Rouge et Noir" – 4:32

B-side :

1. "Plus forte que l'océan" – 4:09

== Charts ==
=== Weekly charts ===
Weekly chart performance for "En rouge et noir"
Chart (1986)	Peak position
Europe (European Hot 100 Singles)	22
Europe (European Airplay Top 50)	19
France (SNEP)	1

=== Year-end charts ===
Year-end chart performance for "En rouge et noir"
Chart (1986)	Position
Europe (European Hot 100 Singles)	54

== Certifications ==
Certifications for "En rouge et noir"
Region	Certification	Certified units/sales
France (SNEP)	Gold	500,000^{*}
^{*} Sales figures based on certification alone.

== See also ==
- List of number-one singles of 1986 (France)
