= J'accuse (disambiguation) =

J'Accuse…! (French for I Accuse) is an 1898 open letter by Émile Zola concerning the Dreyfus affair.

J'accuse may also refer to:

== Films ==
- J'accuse (1919 film), a 1919 French silent film set during World War I, directed by Abel Gance
- J'accuse! (1938 film), a remake of the 1919 film, also directed by Gance
- Rembrandt's J'Accuse, 2008 Dutch, German, Finnish documentary directed by Peter Greenaway
- An Officer and a Spy (film), a 2019 film also known as J'Accuse, directed by Roman Polański

== Music ==
- "J'accuse", a French song by Michel Sardou
- J'accuse (album), 2010 album by Damien Saez, or the title song

== See also ==
- I Accuse (disambiguation)
- SYR7: J'Accuse Ted Hughes, seventh release of American group Sonic Youth's SYR series
- J'accuse - The Dark Side of Nice, a 1982 pamphlet published in dual language format in English & French by the English author Graham Greene concerning government corruption in the south of France
- Léon Bloy, novelist, essayist and political activist who in 1900 wrote Je m'accuse, "I accuse myself".
- Jack Hues (real name Jeremy Ryder, born 1954), a British musician whose stage name was a pastiche of the name of Émile Zola's open letter about the Dreyfus affair
