= Jeanne Mas (album) =

Studio album by Jeanne Mas
- Released: January 1985
- Recorded: 1984−1985
- Studio: Studio du Palais des Congrès, Paris; Titania Studios, Rome
- Genre: Electropop, euro disco
- Length: 42:08
- Label: Pathé Marconi
- Producer: Romano Musumarra; Daniel Balavoine; Andy Scott; Joe Hammer

Jeanne Mas chronology
Jeanne Mas (1985)	Femmes d'aujourd'hui (1986)

Singles from Jeanne Mas
- 1. "Toute première fois " Released: February 1984; 2. "Johnny, Johnny" Released: January 1985; 3. "Cœur en stéréo " Released: September 1985

Jeanne Mas is the eponymously titled debut album from French pop singer Jeanne Mas. The music is entirely written by Romano Musumarra who also worked with artists such as Elsa Lunghini and Princess Stephanie of Monaco, the album peaked at #5 for two months on the French Albums Chart and achieved Gold status.

== Track listing ==
1. "Parle et ça passe" (Jeanne Mas, Massimo Calabrese, Piero Calabrese, Romano Musumarra) – 4:23
2. "Johnny, Johnny" (J. Mas, R. Musumarra) – 4:21
3. "Lisa" (J. Mas, R. Musumarra) – 4:12
4. "Toute première fois" (J. Mas, R. Musumarra, Roberto Zaneli) – 4:15
5. "Suspens" (J. Mas, R. Musumarra) – 4:43
6. "Coeur en stéréo" (J. Mas, P. Calabrese, R. Musumarra) – 4:30
7. "Oh Mama" (J. Mas, M. Calabrese, P. Calabrese, R. Musumarra) – 4:15
8. "Loin d'ici" (J. Mas, Lorenzo Meinardi, R. Musumarra) – 3:50
9. "Pas de chanson" (J. Mas, M. Calabrese, P. Calabrese, R. Musumarra) – 3:40
10. "Flash" (J. Mas, M. Calabrese, P. Calabrese, R. Musumarra) – 3:36

== Album credits ==
=== Personnel ===
- Jeanne Mas - vocals
- Romano Musumarra - guitar, bass, keyboards, drum programming
- Walter Martino - drums
- Michele Martusciello - horn
- Yves Chouard - guitar ("Cœur en stéréo" & "Oh mama")
- Christian Padovan – bass ("Cœur en stéréo" & "Oh mama")
- Hervé Limeretz - keyboards ("Cœur en stéréo" & "Oh mama")
- Daniel Balavoine - keyboards ("Cœur en stéréo" & "Oh mama")
- Joe Hammer - drums ("Cœur en stéréo" & "Oh mama")

=== Production ===
- Arrangements & producer - Romano Musumarra
- Producers - Daniel Balavoine, Andy Scott, Joe Hammer ("Cœur en stéréo" & "Oh mama")
- Engineer - Gianpaolo Bresciani at Titania Studios
- Engineer - Andy Scott at Studio du Palais des Congrès ("Cœur en stéréo" & "Oh mama")
- Assistant engineer - Frédéric Defay ("Cœur en stéréo" & "Oh mama")
- Mixing - Dominique Blanc-Francard at Studio Continental, Paris
- Assistant mixing - Patricia Guen
- Production manager - Gérard Jardillier
- Management - Nicolas Dunoyer

=== Design ===
- Photography - Tato, Claude Gassian, Vincent/Stills

== Charts, certifications and sales ==
Chart (1985)	Peak position
French Albums Chart	5

Region	Certification	Certified units/sales
France (SNEP)	Gold	100,000^{*}
^{*} Sales figures based on certification alone.
