= Stéphanie (album) =

Studio album by Stéphanie
- Released: 30 July 1991
- Recorded: 1987–1991
- Genre: Pop, pop rock, electronic
- Length: 43:58
- Label: WTG, Epic
- Producer: Michael Verdick, Ron Bloom

Stéphanie chronology
Besoin (1986)	Stéphanie (1991)	Collection Référence 80 (2011)

Singles from Stéphanie
- 1. "Winds of Chance" Released: 1991; 2. "You Don't Die from Love" Released: 1991

Professional ratings
Review scores
Source	Rating
Calgary Herald	B
Music & Media	(favorable)

Stéphanie is the second and final studio album released by Princess Stéphanie of Monaco. The album was released on 30 July 1991 through the WTG Records in the United States, and the Epic Records in Europe. It was released five years after her successful debut album Besoin. Stéphanie met with disappointing sales — it sold only 3,500 copies in the United States — and negative reviews. In 1992, Stéphanie ended her music career.

== Album information ==
In 1987, after the release of her successful debut album Besoin, Stéphanie moved to Los Angeles, California, due to a further development of her music career. She signed a record contract with the Sony Music, and released Stéphanie through their label WTG Records. Epic Records released the album in Europe. While her previous album featured Europop and eurodance songs, Stéphanie experimented with pop rock and electronic music on Stéphanie. Stéphanie and her producer Ron Bloom wrote all the songs, all in English language. Michael Verdick and Bloom produced most of the songs.

== Singles and promotion ==
The album's lead single "Winds of Chance" was released in 1991, with the accompanying music video shot in the Canary Islands. However, the single was not commercially successful, failing to mirror singles from Stéphanie's previous album Besoin. In summer 1991, Stéphanie launched her first world tour, throughout Europe and South America, in order to promote Stéphanie. Despite the tour being rather successful, the album did not achieve commercial success. The second single was "You Don't Die from Love".

== Reception ==
Stéphanie received mixed reviews from music critics. Dave Obee from Calgary Herald felt that her first North American single, "Winds of Chance" is the "weakest song" on the album, adding, "But give the princess a chance, and you'll discover she delivers top-notch pop with a strong, personal lyrical punch. You'll find yourself checking the label - and discovering that Stephanie co-wrote nine of the 10 songs. It would be easy to dismiss Stephanie as a spoiled royal brat indulging herself, but that's not fair. She may not be the queen of pop, but she's a serious contender." Pan-European magazine Music & Media commented, "Even princesses embark on careers in show business. No problem for Stephanie, it runs in the royal family of Monaco. This highly commercial pop/disco debut album will definitely put the crown on her work." David Hiltbrand of People wrote, "This isn't a humiliating outing. But it sure is embarrassing. Oh, Steph hits all the notes but, unfortunately, without any conviction or depth".

== Track listing ==
No.	Title	Writer(s)	Producer(s)	Length
1.	"Winds of Chance"	Stéphanie, R. Bloom	Michael Verdick	4:23
2.	"You Don't Die from Love"	D. Weiss, D. White	Michael Verdick	4:20
3.	"Love Once"	Stéphanie, R. Bloom	Michael Verdick	4:57
4.	"Born Blue"	Stéphanie, R. Bloom	Michael Verdick	3:57
5.	"Words Upon the Wind"	Stéphanie, R. Bloom	Michael Verdick	4:36
6.	"Sky Fall Down"	Stéphanie, R. Bloom	Michael Verdick	4:08
7.	"Unchained"	Stéphanie, R. Bloom	Michael Verdick	4:03
8.	"Hunger Rise"	Stéphanie, R. Bloom	Ron Bloom	4:50
9.	"I Escape"	Stéphanie, R. Bloom	Michael Verdick	4:23
10.	"Good Dreams"	Stéphanie, R. Bloom	Michael Verdick	4:21
Total length:				43:58

== Personnel ==
- Princess Stéphanie of Monaco – vocals
- Ron Bloom – keyboards, Fairlight CMI, guitars, percussion, BGV arrangements
- Claude Gaudette – additional keyboards (2)
- Tony Smith – additional programming (2)
- C.J. Vanston – additional keyboards (3)
- Brad Buxer – additional keyboards (8)
- Michael Landau – guitars (2)
- Bruce Gaitsch – guitar solo (2)
- Neil Stubenhaus – bass (2)
- Randy Jackson – additional bass (8)
- Mike Baird – drums (2)
- Rafael Padilla – additional percussion (3)
- Linda Harmon – backing vocals (1–4)
- Mary Hylan – backing vocals (1–4, 6, 7, 9, 10)
- Linda Mallah – backing vocals (1–4, 6, 7, 9, 10)
- Andraé Crouch – vocal director (5)
- The Andraé Crouch Singers – backing vocals (5)
- Charlene Anderson – additional vocals (5), backing vocals (8)
- Jhelisa Anderson – additional vocals (5), backing vocals (8)
- Kenny Cetera – additional vocals (5)
- Wayne O. Holmes – Anderson – additional vocals (5)
- Roslynn Keel – additional vocals (5)
- James E. Morrison – Anderson – additional vocals (5)
- Olivia McClurkin – ending vocal solo (5)

=== Production ===
- Michael Verdick – recording, mixing
- Ron Bloom – mixing, additional recording (1–7, 9, 10)
- Humberto Gatica – remixing (2)
- Ricky Delena – additional recording (8)
- Kristen Connolly – second engineer
- Brian McHugh – second engineer
- Guy Snider – second engineer
- David Mitson – mastering at Sony Music Studios (Los Angeles, California)
- David Coleman – art direction
- Michael Miller – photography

== Charts ==
Chart	Peak position
Finnish Albums (Suomen virallinen lista)	33
French Albums (SNEP)	48
