= Flash (Stéphanie song) =

Single by Stéphanie

from the album Besoin
- B-side: "Le Sega mauricien"
- Released: October 1986 (French version); December 1986 (English version)
- Recorded: 1986
- Studio: Studio Marcadet, Paris
- Length: 5:48
- Label: Carrere
- Songwriters: Michel Jouveaux (lyrics); Roberto Zaneli (music); Carol Welsman (English version)
- Composer: Romano Musumarra
- Producer: Yves Roze

Stéphanie singles chronology
"Ouragan" (1986)	"Flash" (1986)	"Fleurs du mal (à Paul)" (1987)

Alternative cover
- "One Love to Give"

"Flash", also recorded in an English-language version titled "One Love to Give", is a 1986 song recorded by Princess Stéphanie of Monaco, known mononymously in her music releases as Stéphanie. It was the second single of her debut album, Besoin, and was released at the end of 1986. It was a top five hit in several European countries, including France, Finland and Sweden.

== Background and release ==
After the success of her number one debut single "Ouragan" in the second quarter of 1986, Stéphanie decided to continue her musical career releasing an album, Besoin, which met with success on the French Albums Chart, as it reached number six and was certified gold disc. She then followed up "Ouragan" with a second single, "Flash", which was eagerly awaiting by the public who wanted to see whether the princess would be able to duplicate her first success. As for "Ouragan", composer Romano Musumarra participated in the song's writing and production, helped by Roberto Zanelli and Michel Jouveaux who also composed the melodious music. The song was also recorded in English-language to be released, about two months after the original version, in the non-French speaking countries, being re-entitled "One Love to Give", with new lyrics written by Carol Welsman. Both versions were included on the Besoin album as the 9th and 14th tracks, respectively, "One Love to Give" featuring in its 12" remix version with an extended musical introduction.

== Music video ==
The music video begins displaying the sentence "Les fantômes existent encore, Stéphanie n'y croyait pas, et pourtant..." Stéphanie appears with an androgynous look, performing the song in a castle, along with her friend and singer Gérard Blanc (who had success in 1987 with "Une autre histoire"), who plays the guitar in the video. Kamil Rustam, who won the 1985 Victoire de la musique for best arrangement, can also be seen playing the guitar and, in another scene, kissing Stephanie's hand. As with the one for "Ouragan", the video alternates English and French lyrics.

== Chart performance ==
Although "Flash" was a hit in France, it achieved a moderate success in comparison of "Ouragan". It entered the chart at number six on 18 October 1986, and reached a peak of number four in its fourth and fifth weeks on the chart. The single stayed for nine weeks in the top ten and 15 weeks in the top 50, and was certified Silver disc by the Syndicat National de l'Édition Phonographique for at least 250,000 units. It featured for one week on the Swiss Singles Chart, at number 28, on 26 October 1986. The English version "One Love to Give" had a great success in Sweden where it debuted at number nine in the late December 1986 and topped the chart for one month, was also a top three hit in Finland, and peaked at number ten in Germany. On the Music & Media's Eurochart Hot 100, the song debuted at number 56 on 11 October 1986, reached number ten in its fifth week, and charted for a total of 18 weeks. It also had an eight-week chart run on the European Airplay Top 50, with a peak at number 26 in its penultimate week.

== Track listings ==
- 7" single
1. "Flash" — 4:20
2. "Le Sega mauricien" — 4:30
- 12" maxi
1. "Flash" (remix) — 7:50
2. "Le Sega mauricien" (remix) — 4:25
- 7" single (English version)
1. "One Love to Give" — 4:20
2. "Le Sega mauricien" — 4:20
- 12" maxi (English version)
1. "One Love to Give" (remix) — 7:29
2. "Flash — 4:18
3. "Le Sega mauricien" — 4:22

== Credits ==
- Guy Battarel - remix ("Flash" & "One Love to Give")
- Gérard Blanc - arranger ("Le Sega mauricien"), remix ("Flash")
- Jean-Philippe Bonichon - engineer, mixing, remix
- Thierry Durbet - arranger ("Le Sega mauricien")
- Frédéric Meylan - photography
- Romano Musumarra - arranger ("Flash" & "One Love to Give")
- Yves Roze - producer for Julisa
- Franck Segarra - assistant engineer, remix ("One Love to Give")

== Cover versions ==
Swedish singer Magnus Carlsson released the English and French version on his studio album Pop Galaxy in 2010.

== Charts and certifications ==
=== Weekly charts ===
Weekly chart performance for "Flash"/"One Love to Give"
Chart (1986–1987)	Peak position
Europe (European Hot 100)	10
Europe (European Airplay Top 50)	26
Finland (Suomen virallinen lista)	3
France (SNEP)	4
Quebec (ADISQ)	3
Sweden (Sverigetopplistan)	1
Switzerland (Schweizer Hitparade)	28
West Germany (GfK)	10

=== Certifications ===
Certifications for "Flash"/"One Love to Give"
Region	Certification	Certified units/sales
France (SNEP)	Silver	250,000^{*}
^{*} Sales figures based on certification alone.
