= Les Crises de l'âme =

Studio album by Jeanne Mas
- Released: February 1989
- Recorded: 1988; Studio Davout, Paris; Musika Studios, Paris
- Genre: Pop music
- Length: 48:30
- Label: Pathé Marconi
- Producers: Piero Calabrese, Jeanne Mas

Jeanne Mas chronology
Femmes d'aujourd'hui (1986)	Les Crises de l'âme (1989)	L'art des femmes (1990)

Singles from Les Crises de l'âme
- 1. "Y'a des bons..." Released: February 1989; 2. "J'accuse" Released: June 1989; 3. "Carolyne" Released: September 1989; 4. "Bébé rock" Released: January 1990

Les crises de l'âme is the third studio album by French pop singer Jeanne Mas, released in 1989.

It marked a change in writing and musical style; indeed, unlike the two previous studio albums, the music was not written by Romano Musumarra, the songs deal with society themes and the music is also much less commercial.

The album charted from February 26, 1989, debuting at #5 before climbing to #1 where it remained for 4 weeks. It totaled fourteen weeks in the top ten and thirty-six weeks in the top 40. It was certified double gold.

Four singles were released from this album, but only "Y'a des bons..." was a hit, reaching the top 13 in France.

== Track listing ==
1. "Les crises de l'âme" (Jeanne Mas, Massimo Calabrese, Piero Calabrese, Roberto Zaneli) – 5:00
2. "Carolyne" (Jeanne Mas, Massimo Calabrese, Piero Calabrese, Roberto Zaneli) – 4:00
3. "Tango" (Jeanne Mas) – 4:57
4. "Y'a des bons..." (Jeanne Mas, Massimo Calabrese, Piero Calabrese, Roberto Zaneli) – 4:54
5. "Bébé rock" (Jeanne Mas) – 5:20
6. "Contre toi" (Jeanne Mas, Massimo Calabrese, Piero Calabrese, Roberto Zaneli) – 3:30
7. "Flip trip" (Jeanne Mas, Pasquale Minieri) – 4:27
8. "Bulles" (Jeanne Mas, Massimo Calabrese, Piero Calabrese, Roberto Zaneli) – 4:23
9. "J'accuse" (Jeanne Mas, Massimo Calabrese, Piero Calabrese, Roberto Zaneli) – 4:55
10. "Comme un héros" (Jeanne Mas, Massimo Calabrese, Piero Calabrese, Roberto Zaneli) – 5:03
11. "Dites-lui" (Jeanne Mas) – 1:52

== Album credits ==
=== Personnel ===
- Vocals - Jeanne Mas
- Background vocals - Graziella Madrigal ("Bulles")
- Guitar - Marco Papazian ("Les crises de l'âme"), David Rhodes
- Acoustic guitar - José Souc ("Tango")
- Bass & Chapman stick - Tony Levin
- Keyboards & programming - Piero Calabrese
- Drums - Manu Katché
- Percussion - Steve Shehan
- Saxophone - Patrick Bourgoin

=== Production ===
- Producers - Piero Calabrese & Jeanne Mas
- Arrangements - Piero Calabrese
- Engineer & mixing - Gordon Lyon at Musika Studios
- Assistant engineers - Laurent Patte, Olivier Richter
- Engineer (drums) - Nicolas Garin at Studio Davout
- Management - Christian Blanchard

=== Design ===
- Photography - Ennio Antonangeli
- Cover design - Jeanne Mas

== Charts, certifications and sales ==
Chart (1986–1987)	Peak position
French Albums Chart	1
Swiss Albums Chart	21

Country	Certification	Date	Sales certified	Physical sales
France	2 x Gold	1989	400,000	400 000
