= Anything Goes: Stephane Grappelli & Yo-Yo Ma Play (Mostly) Cole Porter =

Studio album by Stéphane Grappelli, Yo-Yo Ma
- Released: 1989
- Studios: Davout, Paris, France
- Genres: Jazz, pop standards
- Length: 55:23
- Label: Columbia
- Producer: Ettore Stratta

Anything Goes: Stephane Grappelli & Yo-Yo Ma Play (Mostly) Cole Porter is an album by Stéphane Grappelli and Yo-Yo Ma, released in 1989. It was produced by Ettore Stratta. The songs were arranged by Roger Kellaway.

== Critical reception ==
Professional ratings
Review scores
Source	Rating
AllMusic	3/5 stars

The Buffalo News wrote: "Yo-Yo Ma is a bit of a stiff in this context ... but with tone like that and such willingness, who could begrudge him the pleasure of reveling in the suavities of jazz' greatest violinist?"

== Track listing ==
All songs written by Cole Porter unless otherwise noted.

1. "Anything Goes" – 5:51
2. "You'd Be So Easy to Love " – 8:23
3. "I Concentrate on You" – 3:49
4. "Just One of Those Things" – 2:28
5. "In the Still of the Night" – 4:43
6. "Love of My Life" (Roger Kellaway) – 3:47
7. "Pas-de-Two" (Ettore Stratta) – 4:32
8. "Sweet Lorraine" (Cliff Burwell) – 7:33
9. "So in Love" – 7:27
10. "All Through the Night" – 6:19

== Personnel ==
- Stéphane Grappelli – violin
- Yo-Yo Ma – cello
- Jon Burr – double bass
- Marc Fosset – guitar
- Daniel Humair – drums
- Roger Kellaway – piano

Production

- Ettore Stratta – producer
- Claude Ermelin – engineer
- Philippe Bouasse – assistant engineer
- Roger Kellaway – arrangements and music direction
- John Frost – photography
- Ettore Stratta – liner notes

Recorded at Davout Studios, Paris, France.
