= Femmes d'aujourd'hui =

Studio album by Jeanne Mas
- Released: April 1986
- Recorded: 1986; Studio du Palais des Congrès, Paris; PUK Studios, Randers; Titania Studios, Rome
- Genre: Electropop
- Length: 43:47
- Label: Pathé Marconi
- Producers: Dominique Blanc-Francard, Thierry Durbet, Joe Hammer, Jeanne Mas, Romano Musumarra

Jeanne Mas chronology
Jeanne Mas (1985)	Femmes d'aujourd'hui (1986)	Les crises de l'âme (1989)

Singles from Femmes d'aujourd'hui
- 1. "En Rouge et Noir" Released: April 1986; 2. "L'Enfant " Released: September 1986; 3. "Sauvez-moi " Released: February 1987

Femmes d'aujourd'hui is the second studio album by Jeanne Mas, released in April 1986 by Pathé Marconi. Music for 8 of the 10 tracks was written by Romano Musumarra. The French singer Daniel Balavoine also participated in the production of the album (including "Cœur en stéréo"). Charting from 3 May 1986, it peaked at #1 for two months on the French Albums Chart and spent 63 weeks in the top 30, most of them in the top ten. It was certified Platinum and remains Mas' most successful album to date in terms of sales and chart performance.

== Track listing ==
1. "La Geisha" (Jeanne Mas, Romano Musumarra) – 5:06
2. "En Rouge et Noir" (J. Mas, Massimo Calabrese, Piero Calabrese, Lorenzo Meinardi, R. Musumarra) – 4:32
3. "Idéali" (J. Mas) – 4:35
4. "Lola" (J. Mas, R. Musumarra) – 3:44
5. "Femme d'aujourd'hui" (J. Mas, R. Musumarra, Roberto Zaneli) – 3:34
6. "Mourir d'ennui" (J. Mas, Joe Hammer) – 4:08
7. "Plus forte que l'océan" (J. Mas, R. Musumarra) – 4:09
8. "Sauvez-moi" (J. Mas, R. Musumarra, R. Zaneli) – 3:55
9. "S'envoler jusqu'au bout" (J. Mas, R. Musumarra) – 4:43
10. "L'Enfant" (J. Mas, R. Musumarra, R. Zaneli) – 5:22

== Album credits ==
=== Personnel ===
- Jeanne Mas – lead vocals, backing vocals
- Carol Welsman – backing vocals
- John Wooloff – guitar ("La geisha", "En rouge et noir", "Lola", "Femme d'aujourd'hui", "Mourir d'ennui" & "Plus forte que l'océan")
- Benjamin Raffaëlli – guitar ("Sauvez-moi")
- Romano Musumarra – guitar ("S'envoler jusqu'au bout" & "L'enfant"), piano & programming ("Femme d'aujourd'hui")
- Dominique Grimaldi – bass ("Sauvez-moi")
- Thierry Durbet – synthesizer, drum programming ("Sauvez-moi")
- Walter Martino – drums ("En rouge et noir", "Ideali" & "S'envoler jusqu'au bout")
- Joe Hammer – drums ("Plus forte que l'océan")

=== Production ===
- Arrangements & producer - Romano Musumarra
- Arrangements - Thierry Durbet ("Sauvez-moi")
- Producer - Joe Hammer ("Mourir d'ennui")
- Producers - Dominique Blanc-Francard, Thierry Durbet, Jeanne Mas ("Sauvez-moi")
- Engineer - John "Puk" Quist at PUK Studios
- Engineer - Dominique Blanc-Francard at Studio du Palais des Congrès
- Engineer - Gianpaolo Bresciani at Titania Studios ("Ideali" & "S'envoler jusqu'au bout")
- Mixing - Dominique Blanc-Francard
- Mixing - John "Puk" Quist ("Mourir d'ennui" & "L'enfant")

=== Design ===
- Photography - Ennio Antonangeli, Tato
- Assistant - Silvana Fantino
- Cover design - Jeanne Mas

== Charts, certifications and sales ==
Chart (1986–1987)	Peak position
French Albums Chart	1

Country	Certification	Date	Sales certified	Physical sales
France	3 × Platinum	1986	900,000	1 000,000

== Covers ==
Japanese singer Akina Nakamori recorded an English version of the title track entitled Modern Woman for her 1987 studio album Cross My Palm. Nakamori's version was used for a television commercial for Pioneer Corporation's mini component stereo system Private CD770D.
