= Installation Sonore =

Studio album by Rinôçérôse
- Released: 6 September 1999
- Genres: Electronica; progressive house; tech house; downtempo; electronic rock
- Label: V2 Records

Rinôçérôse chronology
| Retrospective (1997) | Installation Sonore (1999) | Music Kills Me (2002) |

Singles from The Common Task
- 1. "Le Mobilier" Released: 17 July 1999

Professional ratings
Review scores
| Source | Rating |
|---|---|
| AllMusic | 3/5 stars |
| NME | 1.5/5 stars |
| Pitchfork | (6.2/10) |

Installation Sonore (English: Sound Installation) is the second studio album by French electronic rock band, Rinôçérôse. The album was released on 6 September 1999 through V2 Records.

== Track listing ==
| No. | Title | Music | Length |
|---|---|---|---|
| 1. | "la guitaristic house organisation" | Freu/Carrié/Palumbo | 7:09 |
| 2. | "radiocapte" | Freu/Carrié/Palumbo | 5:30 |
| 3. | "sublimior" | Freu/Carrié/Palumbo | 5:33 |
| 4. | "le mobilier" | Freu/Carrié /Palumbo/Saboul | 4:21 |
| 5. | "323 secondes de musique répétitive avec guitare espagnole" | Freu/Carrié/Palumbo | 5:23 |
| 6. | "mes vacances a Rio" | Freu/Carrié/Palumbo | 6:30 |
| 7. | "popular mechanics" | Freu/Carrié/Palumbo | 4:45 |
| 8. | "I love ma guitare" | Freu/Carrié/Palumbo/Saboul | 5:18 |
| 9. | "<<rock classics>> volume I" | Freu/Carrié/Palumbo/Gauthier | 5:21 |
| 10. | "le triangle" | Freu/Carrié/Palumbo | 5:20 |

== Appearances in other media ==
"La Guitaristic House Organization" gained exposure as a sample song with Windows XP to show off Windows Media Player. The song was also featured in the EA Sports video game, NHL 2000.
