= Johnny, Johnny =

Single by Jeanne Mas

from the album Jeanne Mas
- B-side: "Lisa"
- Released: February 1985 (original version); 2005 (remix)
- Recorded: France
- Genre: Synthpop, pop rock
- Length: 4:05
- Label: EMI, Pathé Marconi
- Songwriters: Romano Musumarra; Jeanne Mas
- Producer: Romano Musumarra

Jeanne Mas singles chronology
"Toute première fois" (1984)	"Johnny, Johnny" (1985)	"Cœur en stéréo" (1985)

Alternative cover
- 2005 remix

"Johnny, Johnny" is a 1985 song recorded by the French singer Jeanne Mas. It is the second track on and the second single from her debut album, Jeanne Mas. Released in February 1985, the song became a hit in France, topping the singles chart for about one month.

== Background and writing ==
"Johnny, Johnny" was written and produced by Romano Musumarra, who also composed successful songs in the 1980s for many artists such as Princess Stéphanie of Monaco, Elsa Lunghini, Demis Roussos and Céline Dion.

The song, which deals with a man named Johnny who handles a break-up badly, was recorded in French, but also in English and Spanish.

The song is characterized by "melodious and sweet synthetic notes, with a rhythmical bass and lively percussion". Its structure is similar to Mas's previous hit, "Toute première fois". The song was remixed and reissued in 2005.

== Critical reception ==
A review in Pan-European magazine Music & Media deemed "Johnny, Johnny" a "based disco track [which] deserves to chart elsewhere".

== Chart performance ==
On the French SNEP Singles Chart, "Johnny, Johnny" debuted at number eight on the chart edition of 2 March 1985, climbed to number one in its fifth week and stayed at the top for four weeks, alternating with Al Corley's "Square Rooms". After that, it dropped to number six, and remained for 14 weeks in the top ten and 23 weeks on the chart (top 50). Mas became the first female artist to reach number one on the new SNEP French Singles Chart. "Johnny, Johnny" was played heavily on French radios, topping both the FM and the AM stations charts. Mas's previous single, "Toute première fois", had achieved Gold status awarded by the Syndicat National de l'Édition Phonographique, the French certifier, for over 500,000 units. The 2005 version failed to reach the top 100.

On the European Hot 100, "Johnny, Johnny" entered at number 34 on 11 March 1985 and peaked at 25 four weeks later. On the European Airplay Top 50, it debuted at number 30 on 4 February 1985, peaked at number 13 in its 13th week, and charted for a total of 19 weeks.

== Official versions ==
- Single version – 4:05
- Album version – 4:25
- English version – 4:21
- Spanish version – 4:11
- Extended version – 6:30
- New club mix – 6:22
- Radio edit (2005) – 3:26
- Bounce mix edit (2005) – 3:15
- Remix 2 edit (2005) – 3:19
- Club mix (2005) – 5:18
- Bounce mix (2005) – 6:18

== Track listings ==
7" single

1. "Johnny, Johnny" – 4:05
2. "Lisa" – 4:13

12" maxi

1. "Johnny, Johnny" – 6:30
2. "Lisa" – 4:13

12" maxi

1. "Johnny, Johnny" (new club mix) – 6:22
2. "Johnny, Johnny" (extended version) – 6:30

CD single – 2005 remix

1. "Johnny, Johnny" (radio edit) – 3:26
2. "Johnny, Johnny" (bounce mix edit) – 3:15
3. "Johnny, Johnny" (remix 2 edit) – 3:19

12" maxi – 2005 remix

1. "Johnny, Johnny" (club mix) – 5:18
2. "Johnny, Johnny" (bounce mix) – 6:18

== Certifications ==
Region	Certification	Certified units/sales
France (SNEP)	Gold	500,000^{*}
^{*} Sales figures based on certification alone.

== Charts ==
Chart (1985)	Peak position
Europe (European Airplay Top 50)	13
Europe (European Hot 100)	25
France (Airplay Chart [AM Stations])	1
France (Airplay Chart [FM Stations])	1
France (SNEP)	1
