= Miami (Damien Saez album) =

Miami (Miami - Holy Bible)

Studio album by Damien Saez
- Released: 18 March 2013
- Recorded: 2012
- Genre: French rock
- Length: 47:09
- Label: Wagram Music

Damien Saez chronology
Messina (2012)	Miami (Miami - Holy Bible) (2013)

Singles from Miami
- 1. "Miami" Released: 2013

Miami also known as Miami - Holy Bible is a 2013 album by French singer-songwriter Damien Saez being his 8th studio album. It is credited on the album cover as Saez. The album was recorded in Davout Studios and released on Wagram Records.

== Cover controversy ==
Saez has the habit of provoking controversy in media and society with his album covers notably for J'accuse that depicted a nude woman on a shopping cart. Miami was no exception as its front cover depicted a woman's buttocks covered by a Holy Bible. The back cover showed a huge penis covered by US one hundred-dollar bills with Miami Beach in the background.

Miami cover was censured by Régie autonome des transports parisiens (RATP) in the Paris Métro ads, even before the release of the album.

== SAEZ – Miami Tour ==
SAEZ – Miami Tour is a tour embarked by Damien Saez to promote the album Miami. The first concert was scheduled on 19 March 2013 with many additional dates extending until August 2013.

The cover for the tour, like the cover of the album, generated controversy, depicting a giant penis covered by 500 Euro bills.

== Track listing ==
1. "Pour y voir" (4:44)
2. "Les Infidèles" (3:58)
3. "Rochechouart" (4:54)
4. "Miami" (5:04)
5. "Le roi" (5:40)
6. "Des drogues" (5:03)
7. "Cadillac noire" (4:27)
8. "Rottweiler" (4:41)
9. "No More" (4:51)
10. "Que sont-elles devenues" (4:38)

== Personnel ==
- Damien Saez: vocals, keyboards, guitar
- Franck Phan: guitar, programming, keyboards
- James Eller: bass
- Maxime Garoute: drums

Additional instruments

- Thomas Coeuriot: guitar
- Pat West: guitar
- Théo Cholbi: drums
- Petit Jack.

== Charts ==
Chart (2013)	Peak position
Belgian Albums (Ultratop Wallonia)	14
French Albums (SNEP)	4
Swiss Albums (Schweizer Hitparade)	26
