= Automat (Romano Musumarra and Claudio Gizzi album) =

Studio album by Romano Musumarra and Claudio Gizzi
- Released: January 1978
- Recorded: November 1977 – December 1977
- Genre: Electronic, Disco
- Length: 33:52
- Label: Harvest Records
- Producer: EMI Italy

Automat is an album of instrumental electronic music composed by the Italian musicians Romano Musumarra and Claudio Gizzi. It was produced in 1977 and released in 1978 by EMI Italy, through its Harvest label.

All the sounds in this album were generated by the MCS70, a monophonic analog synthesizer designed, built and programmed by the Italian engineer Mario Maggi.

Automat was Musumarra's initiative – after learning about the new instrument, he proposed to EMI Italy that he produce an album of electronic instrumental music. Although at the time such a project was considered risky, the answer was positive. EMI suggested, however, that Claudio Gizzi, a more experienced composer that already worked with them, also participate in the project.

The composition work was divided: Gizzi contributed to side A, who filled it with a long suite with 3 movements, and Musumarra contributed to side B, who composed three shorter pieces.

They had very little time to complete the project with only four weeks in the studio. As a result, the last track, Mecadence, was left somewhat incomplete.

The sound engineer in charge of the project was Luciano Torani.

== Tracks ==
Side A (by Claudio Gizzi):

- 01 – Automat

(The) Rise (6:07)
(The) Advance (4:06)
(The) Genus (6:31)

Side B (by Romano Musumarra):

- 02 – Droid (5:30)
- 03 – Ultraviolet (6:44)
- 04 – Mecadence (4:00)

== Production ==
Automat was the result of an unrepeatable sequence of events. The final result did not please either Musumarra and Gizzi nor the producers. They never collaborated on any other project nor had the opportunity to use the MCS70 again. Automat has only been released on CD once. Despite this (or perhaps because of it) the album achieved a "cult" status among many fans of electronic music. Musumarra and Gizzi subsequently had successful careers as movie soundtrack composers. Musumarra also had many partnerships as a songwriter and/or producer with famous pop artists, among them the Canadian singer Céline Dion. His remarkable style of electronic arranging and composition can be heard, for instance, in the track "Je Danse Dans Ma Tête", from the Céline's 1991 album Dion chante Plamondon.

=== Equipment ===
Besides the MCS70 they also used: Sequential Circuits 3 row by 16 steps analog sequencer synced to a 16 track recorder for overdubs, EMT digital reverberation unit, Horban parametric equalizer (x2), 30 band graphic equalizer, natural echo chamber for reverberation, a 2 track recorder for delay effects.

The condition imposed by Mario Maggi to participate on the project was that the MCS70 were the only synthesizer used in it. All the sounds had to be obtained from it, even the drum sounds. The MCS70 would be presented in the 1978 Frankfurt Musikmesse and, for Maggi, the album would be a demonstration of the capabilities of his new synth.

MCS means "Memory Controlled Synthesizer". It was common for synths at the time to need the manual adjustment of every control in the panel to get a desired sound, a task that often took a considerable amount of time. In the MCS70 a sound, once programmed, could be stored in memory and quickly recovered later. Mario Maggi filled the 64 available memory positions with sounds created by him and these were the sounds used in the album.

Only one MCS70 was ever built. Before going into production, polyphonic synthesizers like the Sequential Circuits Prophet 5 arrived at the market and, all of a sudden, monophonic synths were considered obsolete. Mario Maggi then dropped the MCS70 project and started what would be his most famous synthesizer project ever: the polyphonic Elka Synthex. In many regards, though, the MCS70 was superior. The MCS70 was bought by Patrizio Fariselli, member of the Italian Progressive Rock band Area, and used extensively in the band's 1980 album Tic-Tac.

== Reception ==
French musician Jean Michel Jarre was the first person to get a copy of Automat. While Automat was being produced, Jarre released his album Oxygène, which became one of the most famous works of electronic music ever. Through the intervention of Claude Cavagnolo, at the time the representative of Montarbo's audio products in France, Mario Maggi was introduced to Jarre and met him in his studio in Paris in 1978. At this occasion Jarre listened to a copy of Automat on tape and, after giving an autographed copy of Oxygène to Mr. Maggi, was given a copy of Automat as a gift (although the album was not yet available in the music stores).

== Back cover ==
In the back cover, besides the production credits, the album had the following text:

In the beginning there was the "MACHINE"

the survival and the organization of the planet depend upon the "MACHINE"
the future and the past depend upon the "MACHINE"... the past?

but who wanted the "MACHINE" ?

This text was inserted by the EMI's commercial personnel. The artists had nothing to do with it.
