= Jours étranges =

Studio album by Damien Saez
- Released: October 25, 1999
- Recorded: 1998–1999
- Genre: French rock

Damien Saez chronology
Jours étranges (1999)	God Blesse / Katagena (2002)

Singles from Jours étranges
- 1. "Jeune et con" Released: 2000; 2. "Sauver cette étoile" Released: 2000

Jours étranges is a Damien Saez album, released on October 25, 1999.

== Track listing ==
1. Jeune et con ("Young and stupid") – 3:52
2. Sauver cette étoile ("Save that star") – 5:02
3. Jours étranges ("Strange days") – 5:19
4. J'veux m'en aller ("I wanna go away") – 6:24
5. Hallelujah – 4:09
6. Crépuscule ("Twilight") – 5:09
7. Soleil 2000 ("Sun 2000") – 5:12
8. Amandine II – 3:31
9. Rock'n'Roll Star – 3:53
10. My Funny Valentine – 4:21
11. Montée là-haut ("[She] Went up there") – 6:06
12. Petit Prince ("Little Prince") – 3:04
