= I Accuse =

I Accuse may refer to:

- I Accuse (2003 film), a Canadian drama film, based on the case of John Schneeberger
- I Accuse (1941 film), a Nazi German pro-euthanasia propaganda film
- I Accuse!, a 1958 British biographical historical drama film, based on the Dreyfus affair

== See also ==
- J'accuse (disambiguation)
