= Music Kills Me =

Studio album by Rinôçérôse
- Released: 2002
- Genres: Electronic; House; Downtempo
- Length: 60:35
- Label: V2 Records

Rinôçérôse chronology
| Installation Sonore (1999) | Music Kills Me (2002) | Schizophonia (2005) |

Music Kills Me is a studio album by French electronic band Rinôçérôse. It was released 19 February 2002, by V2 Records.

== Critical reception ==
Professional ratings
Aggregate scores
| Source | Rating |
|---|---|
| Metacritic | 60/100 |
Review scores
| Source | Rating |
| AllMusic | 2/5 stars |
| Pitchfork | 2.7/10 |
| Slant | 3/5 stars |
| Spin | (8/10) |

Music Kills Me was met with "mixed or average" reviews from critics. At Metacritic, which assigns a weighted average rating out of 100 to reviews from mainstream publications, this release received an average score of 60, based on 11 reviews.

== Track listing ==
| No. | Title | Length |
|---|---|---|
| 1. | "Le Rock Summer" | 4:01 |
| 2. | "Music Kills Me" | 6:04 |
| 3. | "It's Time To Go Now!" | 5:30 |
| 4. | "Lost Love" | 4:29 |
| 5. | "Dead Flowers" | 5:55 |
| 6. | "Résurrection D'une Idôle Pop" | 4:06 |
| 7. | "Professeur Suicide" | 6:55 |
| 8. | "No We Are Not Experienced!" | 5:43 |
| 9. | "Brian Jones : Last Picture" | 5:34 |
| 10. | "Obsèques D'un Guitar Hero" | 4:22 |
| 11. | "Dead Can Dance" | 3:49 |
| 12. | "Highway To Heaven" | 4:07 |
| Total length: | | 60:35 |
