= Messina (album) =

Studio album by Damien Saez
- Released: 17 September 2012
- Recorded: 2011–2012
- Genre: French rock
- Length: 1. Les Échoués - 47:02; 2. Sur les quais - 40:05; 3. Messine - 58:01; Total set - 145:08
- Label: Wagram Music

Damien Saez chronology
J'accuse (2010)	Messina (2012)	Miami (2012)

Messina is a 2012 triple album by French singer-songwriter Damien Saez. Each CD was named separately with CD 1 named "Les Échoués", CD 2 "Sur les quais" and CD 3 "Messine". The full set was titled Messina (with an a). the set was released on 17 September 2012. on Wagram Records.

The triple album was not the first by Saez as he had released in 2008 the triple album titled Varsovie - L'Alhambra - Paris. Messina is the name of a Sicilian city of particular significance for Saez. And similar to the Varsovie - L'Alhambra - Paris album, this triple album carries many geographical references and to personalities.

On 29 August 2012, two titles from the album "Betty" and "Les fils d'Artaud" were made available for free downloading. On 16 September 2012, a third track "Messine" was offered free online. Two tracks, "Marie" and "Petite Couturière" were included on album despite being much older recordings.

== Track listing ==
All songs written and composed by Damien Saez

CD 1 / Les Échoués (“The stranded [ones]”)

1. "Fin des mondes" (“End of worlds”) (5:06)
2. "Les Échoués" (“The stranded [ones]”) (4:27)
3. "Betty" (5:23)
4. "Marie" (6:39)
5. "Faut s'oublier" (“Have to forget oneself”) (5:07)
6. "Les fils d'Artaud"(“The sons of Artaud”) (5:52)
7. "Le Gaz"(“The gas”) (4:21)
8. "Into the Wild" (4:34)
9. "À nos amours"(“To our love[r]s”) (5:35)

CD 2 / Sur les quais (“On the quays”)

1. "Marianne" (4:46)
2. "Sur le quai" (“On the quay”) (4:17)
3. "Légionnaire" (“Legionary”) (5:25)
4. "Webcams de nos amours" (“Webcams of our love[r]s”) (4:34)
5. "Ma petite couturière" (“My little seamstress”) (6:06)
6. "Je suis un étranger" (“I am a stranger”) (3:52)
7. "Planche à roulettes" (“Skateboard”) (4:45)
8. "Rois demain" (“Kings tomorrow”) (6:20)

CD 3 / Messine (“Messina”)

1. "Thème Quais de Seine" (“Quays of Seine Theme”) (4:53)
2. "Aux Encres des Amours" (“In inks of love[r]s”) (6:16)
3. "Messine" (“Messina”) (6:16)
4. "Les Magnifiques" (“The magnificent [ones]”) (4:57)
5. "Les Meurtrières" (“The murderesses”) (5:39)
6. "Bouteille à la mer" (“Message in a bottle”) (4:52)
7. "Ami de Liège" (“Friend from Liège”) (7:54)
8. "Le bal des Lycées" (“The prom of high schools”) (7:03)
9. "Thème aux Encres des Amours" (“In inks of love[r]s Theme”) (4:53)
10. "Châtillon-Sur-Seine" (6:06)

== Charts ==
Chart (2013)	Peak position
Belgian Albums (Ultratop Wallonia)	2
French Albums (SNEP)	2
Swiss Albums (Schweizer Hitparade)	24
