= Adans Lopez Peres =

Portuguese acrobat (born 1975)

Adans Lopez Peres (born 8 November 1975) is a Portuguese acrobatic hand-to-hand artist and a fifth-generation performer. He was the eldest son of Salvador de Jesus Peres, a Portuguese acrobat and Beatriz López y Calderón, a Spanish classically trained flamenco dancer.

He is a well-known performer but is probably best known as the second husband of Princess Stéphanie of Monaco. He is 10 years her junior. They allegedly married secretly in Vandœuvres, Switzerland, on 12 September 2003. On 22 July 2004, the London Evening Standard reported that Stephanie had split from Peres and returned to her first husband, Daniel Ducruet, for an attempt at reviving their relationship that didn't last. They were divorced on 24 November 2004, after only 10 months of marriage without any issue.
