= Damien Saez =

French singer-songwriter and musician (born 1977)

Saez
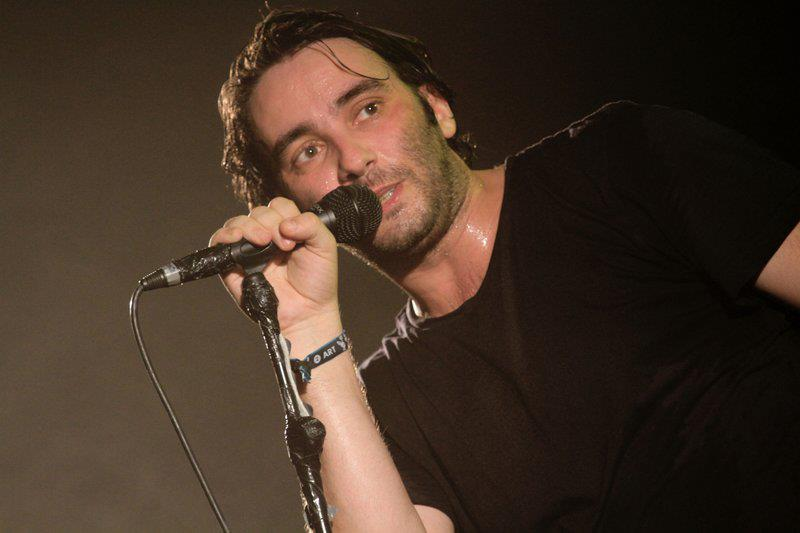

Background information
- Born: Damien Karim Saez; 1 August 1977 (age 49); Saint-Jean-de-Maurienne, Rhône-Alpes, France
- Genres: Rock; chanson
- Occupations: Musician; songwriter; author
- Instruments: Guitar; vocal; piano
- Years active: 1999–present
- Labels: Island; Barclay; Cinq7
- Website: www.saez.mu

Damien Saez (French pronunciation: [damjɛ̃ sɛz]; born 1 August 1977) or just Saez, is a French singer-songwriter and musician.

== Early life ==
Damien Saez was born in Saint-Jean-de-Maurienne, Savoie, on 1 August 1977, where he lived until the age of three or four years before his family moved to Marseille. Saez spent most of his childhood in Marseille until he moved to Dijon when he was about eight years old, where he was raised by his Algerian mother, after she divorced her Andalusian husband. Later, she met a director of documentaries who worked for the French channel 'France 3' and gave birth to Damien's two younger brothers.

At the age of eight, Saez started taking piano lessons with Boris Nedeltchev at the Conservatoire National de Région de Dijon and graduated nine years later. He then took an interest in playing the guitar. His career as a singer began in 1995 when he let his interest in writing come out. He stopped playing in bands that sang covers of more famous bands like Pink Floyd. He wanted to work on his own songs that he had written and try to attract a new audience.

== Career ==
=== Jours Etranges, God Blesse, Debbie (1999–2005) ===
In 1999, a record company became interested in his compositions, and he signed a record contract with Island and began to record his first album Jours étranges ("Strange Days", a tribute to the album of the same name by The Doors) which went double platinum. His first single Jeune et con was broadcast on many radio stations and reached the general public, which earned him a nomination for the Newcomer of the Year award at the Victoires de la Musique in 2001.

In December 2001 his first poetry collection was published entitled À ton nom. In March 2002, he released his second album God Blesse/Katagena. In the meantime he released a piece of instrumental work called Katagena. It was available online via non-official web-sites and downloadable free of charge.

Brian De Palma contacted him and asked him to contribute to the original soundtrack of the movie Femme Fatale that was released in April 2003. The song that was chosen, Sexe, caused a lot of commotion due to its vulgar lyrics. Many radio stations refused to broadcast it, and the music video was banned from television.

On 22 April 2002, the day after the first round of presidential elections, he wrote the song Fils de France online, which was meant to be against French right-wing politician Jean-Marie Le Pen who qualified for the second ballot. The song was written and recorded in about 10 hours, then made available for free on the website of Universal Music.

His third album, Debbie, was released in 2004 with a more rock style than his previous albums.

=== Post-Universal period ===
In 2005 Saez quit Universal Music and went on the Damien Saez: Piano and Voice Tour. His musical style underwent a profound transformation from alternative rock to acoustic ballads, as his singing was accompanied only by three guitars and a piano.

At the end of 2006 and the beginning of 2007, Saez released four new songs in English (Killing the Lambs, Numb, Jessie and Yellow Tricycle) for free on his MySpace page. He performed all of them, except for Jessie, at five acoustic concerts in Paris and Lyon, in June and July 2007, respectively.

=== Varsovie, Alhambra, Paris (2008) ===
On 8 December 2007, Saez released Jeunesse, leve-toi, a song that was written in March during the presidential elections. The song became the first track and also the first single from his next album, Varsovie, Alhambra, Paris. Edited by the independent quality-label Cinq7, it was released on 21 April 2008 as a triple album (Paris was also sold separately), consisting of 29 acoustic songs. The album mainly deals with Saez's breakup with his Polish girlfriend, Katarzyna. The first two discs, Warsaw and Alhambra, bear a similar sound and were meant to pay homage to Jacques Brel, Léo Ferré, Barbara, Georges Brassens and other classic French songwriters. The third disc, Paris, has a richer and more diverse sound and, despite little advertising, was certified gold.

In June and July 2008, accompanied for the first time by a string trio (violin, viola and violoncello), Saez launched, as part of various festivals, a new acoustic tour which was very short-lived: emotionally exhausted by the intimate nature of his songs, Saez decided to cancel his big summer tour and dedicated himself to writing new material.

=== Yellow Tricycle - A Lover's Prayer (2009) ===
On 23 January 2009 Saez launched a new website, dedicated entirely to his new project, consisting of songs written entirely in English. The songs available for free download were "Killing the Lambs", "Numb" and "Yellow Tricycle", which had been released on his MySpace page two years earlier, with the addition of a new song called "White Noise". Their dark rock sound was very different from his previous acoustic album, and marked Saez's return to rock music.

In February 2009 Saez was nominated in the category "Pop-rock Album of the Year" at Victoires de la Musique, where he performed an unpublished song called "Embrassons-nous", which he performed without any rehearsals.

His fifth album, A Lovers Prayer, was released on 16 March 2009 under the pseudonym Yellow Tricycle. The 12 tracks on the album were written entirely in English and Saez's name did not appear anywhere on the cover. It received little advertising and was not backed up by a live tour.

=== J'accuse (2010) ===
At the end of 2009 Saez released a new track, Police, followed in February 2010 by "J'accuse" as a preview of his next rock album, bearing the same name. When the album J'accuse was released, it ranked 3rd in the charts, with 21,229 copies sold in the first week. J'accuse also sparked a controversy and a media debate when the posters with the cover of the album (depicting a nude woman in a shopping cart) were banned from the Paris subway.

=== Messina (2012) ===
In September 2012, Saez released the album Messina, a triple album with the separate titles Les Échoués (CD1), Sur les quais (CD2) and Messine (CD3).

=== Miami (2013) ===
In March 2013, Saez released Miami. This rock album includes 10 tracks, including the lead title "Miami". The song deals with addiction and mixes religion, drugs and fascism on a dance music.

=== Le Manifeste and Le Nouvel Art (2016) ===
An 8-minute video posted on the website www.culturecontreculture.fr, replacing the official website "saez.mu", is published on the evening of 16 June 2016 revealing a vast artistic project entitled "Le Manifeste". In this video Saez announces a long one-year journey, from 31 July 2016 to 31 July 2017, during which songs, photos and texts recounting the journey will be published from city to city over the days, in the image of a notebook combining music, poetry and all forms of art. He describes this art as "Nouvel Art". He presents Mélancolie in this short film: a sad clown, a mime dressed in black "populating the earth with flowers".

"Le Manifeste" begins on 31 July 2016. This trip will take place to the day from the first to the last day of his 40th year.

The first album of the Manifesto is entitled L'oiseau liberté, released in December 2016. This is a short album of 7 songs and a second album of 3 tracks. Two of them will be present on the next album. The second album, Lulu, released on 10 March 2017, is a triple 29-track album. Two excerpts from the album are published free of charge on 22 February for those who participated in the manifesto project. These are Bonnie and Rue d'la soif as well as Château de brume, a new piece. On 24 February, Saez announced via requiem the release of a third album entitled Le Dernier Disque for the fall of 2017, the eleventh album in the artist's discography.

On the eve of 1 May, Damien Saez releases a new song for free download on his website culturecontreculture.fr entitled Premier Mai, in which he denounces both the presence of the far right in the second round of the 2017 presidential election and that of the "banker" Emmanuel Macron.

During the discovery of the Manifesto, videos are shown throughout the tour. First concert first paintings, second concert second paintings, etc. The videos are unveiled at the same time in several places.

== Discography ==
=== Albums ===
as Saez

Album	Year	Charts			Certification	Certification
Album	Year	FRA	BEL (Wa)	SWI	Certification	Certification
Jours étranges: Released: 25 October 1999	1999	22	—	—		
God Blesse / Katagena: Released: 26 March 2002; Format: Double album	2002	10	26	52		Besides the 2-disc CD (comprising the 16-track God Blesse and the 13-track Katagena), a separate instrumental 6-track titled “Katagena LP” is concurrently released on free download.
Debbie: Released: 31 August 2004	2004	2	4	30		
Varsovie - L'Alhambra - Paris: Released: 21 April 2008; Format: Triple album; Varsovie; L'Alhambra; Paris	2008	3	13	45		The album Paris was also released concurrently with the triple album as a one album separate release. It charted at #95 (in Belgian Wallonia album chart) and at #83 in SNEP chart in French album top 200 charts)
J'accuse: Released: 29 March 2010	2010	3	7	25		
Messina: Released: 17 September 2012; Format: Triple album; Les Échoués; Sur les quais; Messine	2012	2	2	24		
Miami: Released: 18 March 2013	2013	4	14	26		
Le manifeste – L'oiseau liberté & prélude acte II: Released: 9 December 2016	2016	15	45	30		
Le manifeste Vol. 1 – Mon Européenne: Released: 20 March 2017	2017		134			
Le manifeste Vol. 2 – Lulu: Released: 20 March 2017	2017	4	12	34		
Le manifeste Vol. 3 – Les bords de Seine: Released: 20 March 2017	2017		151			
#Humanité: Released: 30 November 2018	2018		56	26		SNEP: Gold
Le manifeste 2016 2019: Released: 22 November 2019	2019	—	—	48		
Telegram: Released: 9 December 2022	2022	—	76	—		

as Yellow Tricycle
(pseudonym used by Damien Saez)

Album	Year	Charts			Certification
Album	Year	FRA	BEL (Wa)	SWI	Certification
A Lovers Prayer: Credit: Yellow Tricycle; Released: 16 March 2009	2009	9	20	—	

=== Singles ===
Charting

Year	Single	Charts		Certification	Album
Year	Single	FRA	BEL (Wa)	Certification	Album
2000	"Jeune et con"	14	—		
2000	"Sauver cette étoile"	70	—		
2002	"Sexe" / "Solutions" (double A-side single)	41	—		
2010	"J'accuse"	—	14		
2013	"Miami"	67	—		

Others (non charting)

- 2002: "Fils de France"
- 2002: "Sexe" (soundtrack from Femme fatale)
- 2004: "Debbie"
- 2005: "Marie ou Marylin"
- 2006: "Killing the Lambs" (MySpace release)
- 2007: "Jessie" (MySpace release)
- 2007: "Yellow Tricycle" (MySpace release)
- 2007: "Numb" (MySpace release)
- 2007: "Jeunesse lève-toi" (free download)
- 2010: "Police" (free download)
- 2012: "Betty" (free download)
- 2012: "Les fils d'Artaud" (free download)
- 2012: "Messine" (free download)

== Bibliography ==
- 2001: À ton nom, ISBN 2-7427-3555-0
