= Rinôçérôse =

- Genres: electronica, rock
- Years active: 1997-present
- Label: V2 Records
- Members: Jean-Philippe Freu; Patrice Carrié; Florian Brinker; Fred Pace; Rémi Saboul
- Website: Rinocerose.com

Rinôçérôse (stylized as rinôçérôse or «rinôçérôse») is a French band founded by Jean-Philippe Freu and Patrice Carrié that mixes rock music and electronic dance music. The duo of musicians also work as psychologists, calling themselves, "Psychologists by day, musicians by night". They compose music in English, French, and German. They are based in Montpellier (Occitanie).

"Le Mobilier" established Rinôçérôse within the international electronic dance music market. A subsequent single, "Cubicle", from the album Schizophonia, was featured on a television advertisement for Apple's iTunes and iPod. Schizophonia marked a stylistic shift for the group, incorporating a prominent rock groove in contrast to the ambient electronic sound of their earlier work. The album also features a larger number of vocal tracks; previous releases used lyrics sparingly or omitted them entirely.

The band has released an eponymous greatest hits album, named Rinôçérôse (only differentiated from their first album by the diacritics). Rinôçérôse contains singles such as "Bitch", "Cubicle", "Music Kills Me", and "My Demons".

Rinôçérôse released their most recent album, Psychoânalysis, in 2024.

Their song "La Guitaristic House Organisation" was featured in the soundtrack of the video game NHL 2000 by EA Sports.

== Discography ==
Albums

- Retrospective (1997)
- Installation Sonore (1999)
- Music Kills Me (2002)
- Schizophonia (2005)
- Futurinô (2009)
- Angels & Demons (2017)
- Psychôanalysis (2024)

Greatest hits

- Rinôçérôse (2006)

Singles

- "Inacceptable" (1997)
- "Le Mobilier" (1998)
- "Mes Vacances a Rio" (2000)
- "La Guitaristic House Organisation" (2000)
- "Lost Love" (2002)
- "Cubicle" (2006) No. 40 Billboard Hot Modern Rock Tracks
- "Angels & Demons" (2017)
- "Fighting the Machine" (2017)
- "While My Guitar Gently Funks" (2017)
