= Ouragan (song) =

Single by Stéphanie

from the album Besoin
- Released: March 1986
- Recorded: 1986
- Studio: Studio Marcadet, Paris
- Genre: Synth-pop, dance-pop
- Length: 4:40
- Label: Carrere, Julisa
- Composer: Romano Musumarra
- Lyricists: Marie Léonor (original); Jack Robinson ("Irresistible")
- Producer: Yves Roze

Stéphanie singles chronology
"Ouragan" (1986)	"Flash" (1986)

"Ouragan" (French for "windstorm"), also released in English under the title "Irresistible", is the first single recorded by Princess Stéphanie of Monaco, from her debut album Besoin. Released in 1986, it was a great success in France, where it topped the charts for almost three months, and also in West Germany, where it reached number two.

== Background and writing ==
This song was written by Romano Musumarra, who had already written several hits for Jeanne Mas and Elsa. Yves Roze, the song's producer, is known under the pseudonym of Jean-François Michael, who recorded "Adieu jolie Candy" in 1969.

When Jeanne Mas refused to record the song, the composer offered it to Stéphanie of Monaco, who finally accepted. The song was also recorded in English, under the name "Irresistible", in order to win over the Anglophones and other non-French speaking peoples – but, with little success.

No music video was produced initially, as the song was not expected to be such a success. The only video available was some footage shot in the recording studio. Eventually a video was made directed by Jean-Daniel Lorieux that features the princess in various locations pursuing a mysterious stranger in a hat. At the end of the video, in a significant plot twist, the stranger is revealed to be a male version of Stéphanie with slightly slicked down hair and little makeup. The video runs for 5:20 and uses a remix of the song that alternates between the original French lyrics and the English lyrics for "Irresistible."

== Chart performance ==
"Ouragan" achieved its biggest success in France, where it debuted at number 17 on the chart edition of 5 April 1986 and rocketed up the chart, reached the top position on 26 April, stayed there for ten consecutive weeks, and eventually charted for a total of 29 weeks. The same year, it was certified Platinum single by the Syndicat National de l'Édition Phonographique, for at least one million sales. "Ouragan" thus became the first single to remain at the top of the French Singles Chart for at least ten weeks, beating the previous record hold by Peter and Sloane with "Besoin de rien, envie de toi" in 1985. It was the second best-selling single in 1986, behind "Les Démons de minuit", by Images. "Ouragan" also peaked at number eleven in Switzerland.

In non-French-speaking countries, the song charted in its English version, titled "Irresistible". It was a hit in West Germany, where it debuted at number 46 on 14 April 1986, jumped to number eight the next week, reached number two for two weeks and counted 18 weeks on the chart. In addition, it peaked at number two in Spain, was a top five hit in Austria, but stalled at number 84 in the UK. On the overall Eurochart Hot 100, it debuted at number 95, then jumped to number 11 and reached number two after 13 weeks on the chart, being blocked from the number one slot by Madonna's "Live to Tell", and remained on the chart for 29 weeks, 17 of them in top ten. Much played on radios, it reached number three for consecutive three weeks on the European Airplay Top 50, spending eight weeks in the top ten out of a 15-week chart run.

== Cover versions ==
"Ouragan" was covered by many artists, including Akemi Ishii in Japanese version from her 1986 album Mona Lisa, Michael von der Heide in 1998, Gregorian in a new age version as bonus track on the album Masters of Chant Chapter III, Leslie on her 2007 album 80 Souvenirs, Jolie in French and English versions in 2010. Actors Jean-Paul Rouve and Isabelle Nanty performed the song as duet in the Olivier Baroux's 2011 film Les Tuche. After a live performance of the song in 2012, Italian singer Sabrina Salerno released the song as a digital download in 2015, however the song was never promoted as a single. "Ouragan" was also used in the 2026 animated film Iron Boy, with the titular character's father singing along to the tune.

== Track listings ==
- 7" single

A-side :

1. "Ouragan" — 3:40

B-side :

1. "Irresistible" — 3:45
- 12" maxi

A-side :

1. "Ouragan" — 7:00

B-side :

1. "Ouragan" — 4:35
2. "Irresistible" — 3:40
- 7" single (English version)

A-side :

1. "Irresistible" — 3:44

B-side :

1. "Ouragan" — 3:59
- 12" maxi (English version)

A-side :

1. "Irresistible" (long) — 7:03

B-side :

1. "Ouragan" — 4:26
2. "Irresistible" (short) — 4:44
- 12" maxi (both versions)

A-side :

1. "Ouragan" / "Irresistible" (extended version) — 7:00

B-side :

1. "Irresistible" — 4:40
2. "Ouragan" — 4:35

The single is also available on several of Stéphanie's other albums: Besoin (1986, number six on French Albums Chart, Gold), Stéphanie (1993), Rendez-Vous (2001, track 12), and Ouragan (best of). The song is also on numerous 1980s compilations.

== Charts ==
=== Weekly charts ===
Weekly chart performance for "Ouragan"/"Irresistible"
Chart (1986)	Peak position
Austria (Ö3 Austria Top 40)	5
Europe (European Hot 100)	2
Europe (European Airplay Top 50)	3
Finland (Suomen virallinen lista)	14
France (SNEP)	1
Italy (Musica e dischi)	21
Netherlands (Dutch Top 40)	31
Quebec (ADISQ)	21
Spain (AFYVE)	2
Switzerland (Schweizer Hitparade)	11
UK Singles (Official Charts)	84
West Germany (GfK)	2

=== Year-end charts ===
Year-end chart performance for "Ouragan"/"Irresistible"
Chart (1986)	Position
Europe (European Hot 100)	9
France (SNEP)	2
West Germany (Official German Charts)	17

1985–1989 chart performance for "Ouragan"/"Irresistible"
Chart (1985–1989)	Position
Europe (European Hot 100 Singles)	42

== Certifications ==
Certifications for "Ouragan"
Region	Certification	Certified units/sales
France (SNEP)	Platinum	1,000,000^{*}
^{*} Sales figures based on certification alone.

== See also ==
- List of number-one singles of 1986 (France)
