= Au nom des rois =

Studio album by Jeanne Mas
- Released: September 1992
- Genre: Pop
- Length: 40:43
- Label: AB Productions
- Producer: Piero Calabrese, Jeanne Mas

Jeanne Mas chronology
L'art des femmes (1990)	Au nom des rois (1992)	Jeanne Mas & Les Égoïstes (1996)

Singles from Au nom des rois
- 1. "Au nom des rois " Released: September 1992; 2. "Dors bien Margot " Released: March 1993; 3. "Aime-moi" Released: September 1993

Au nom des rois is the fifth studio album by French pop singer Jeanne Mas, released in 1992.

== Track listing ==
1. "Ces hommes" (Jeanne Mas, Piero Calabrese, Roberto Zaneli) – 5:06
2. "Au nom des rois" (Jeanne Mas, Massimo Calabrese, Piero Calabrese, Roberto Zaneli) – 5:30
3. "Au secours" (Jeanne Mas, Piero Calabrese, Roberto Zaneli) – 4:46
4. "Sûre de lui" (Jeanne Mas, Massimo Calabrese, Piero Calabrese, Roberto Zaneli) – 4:35
5. "Dors bien Margot" (Jeanne Mas, Massimo Calabrese, Piero Calabrese, Roberto Zaneli) – 4:12
6. "Les yeux androgynes" (Jeanne Mas, Piero Calabrese, Roberto Zaneli) – 4:10
7. "Vivre libres" (Jeanne Mas, Piero Calabrese, Roberto Zaneli) – 4:17
8. "A cause de vous" (Jeanne Mas, Piero Calabrese, Roberto Zaneli) – 4:03
9. "La Terre" (Jeanne Mas, Massimo Calabrese, Piero Calabrese, Roberto Zaneli) – 4:04

=== 1993 re-release ===
1. "Aime-moi" (Jeanne Mas) – 3:40
2. "Vivre libres" (Jeanne Mas, Piero Calabrese, Roberto Zaneli) – 4:17
3. "Mis à part" (Jeanne Mas) – 4:03
4. "Les yeux androgynes" (Jeanne Mas, Piero Calabrese, Roberto Zaneli) – 4:10
5. "Ces hommes" (Jeanne Mas, Piero Calabrese, Roberto Zaneli) – 5:06
6. "Au nom des rois" (Jeanne Mas, Massimo Calabrese, Piero Calabrese, Roberto Zaneli) – 5:30
7. "Sens de toi" (Jeanne Mas, Massimo Calabrese, Piero Calabrese, Roberto Zaneli) – 4:35
8. "Dors bien Margot" (Jeanne Mas, Massimo Calabrese, Piero Calabrese, Roberto Zaneli) – 4:12
9. "La Terre" (Jeanne Mas, Massimo Calabrese, Piero Calabrese, Roberto Zaneli) – 4:04
10. "Au secours" (Jeanne Mas, Piero Calabrese, Roberto Zaneli) – 4:46
11. "Sûre de lui" (Jeanne Mas, Massimo Calabrese, Piero Calabrese, Roberto Zaneli) – 4:35
12. "A cause de vous" (Jeanne Mas, Piero Calabrese, Roberto Zaneli) – 4:03

== Album credits ==
=== Personnel ===
- Jeanne Mas – vocals
- Michel-Yves Kochmann – guitar
- Rémy Sarazin – bass

=== Production ===
- Producers - Piero Calabrese, Jeanne Mas
- Arrangements - Piero Calabrese, Jeanne Mas
- Engineer - Marco Lecci, Jean-Louis Maillé, Emmanuel Jankowski
- Assistant - Didier Boughey
- Mixing - Roland Guillotel

Recorded at Studio Musika (France), Studio AB (France), Studio Pollicino (Italy)
