= Théâtre Princesse Grace =

Theatre in Monaco

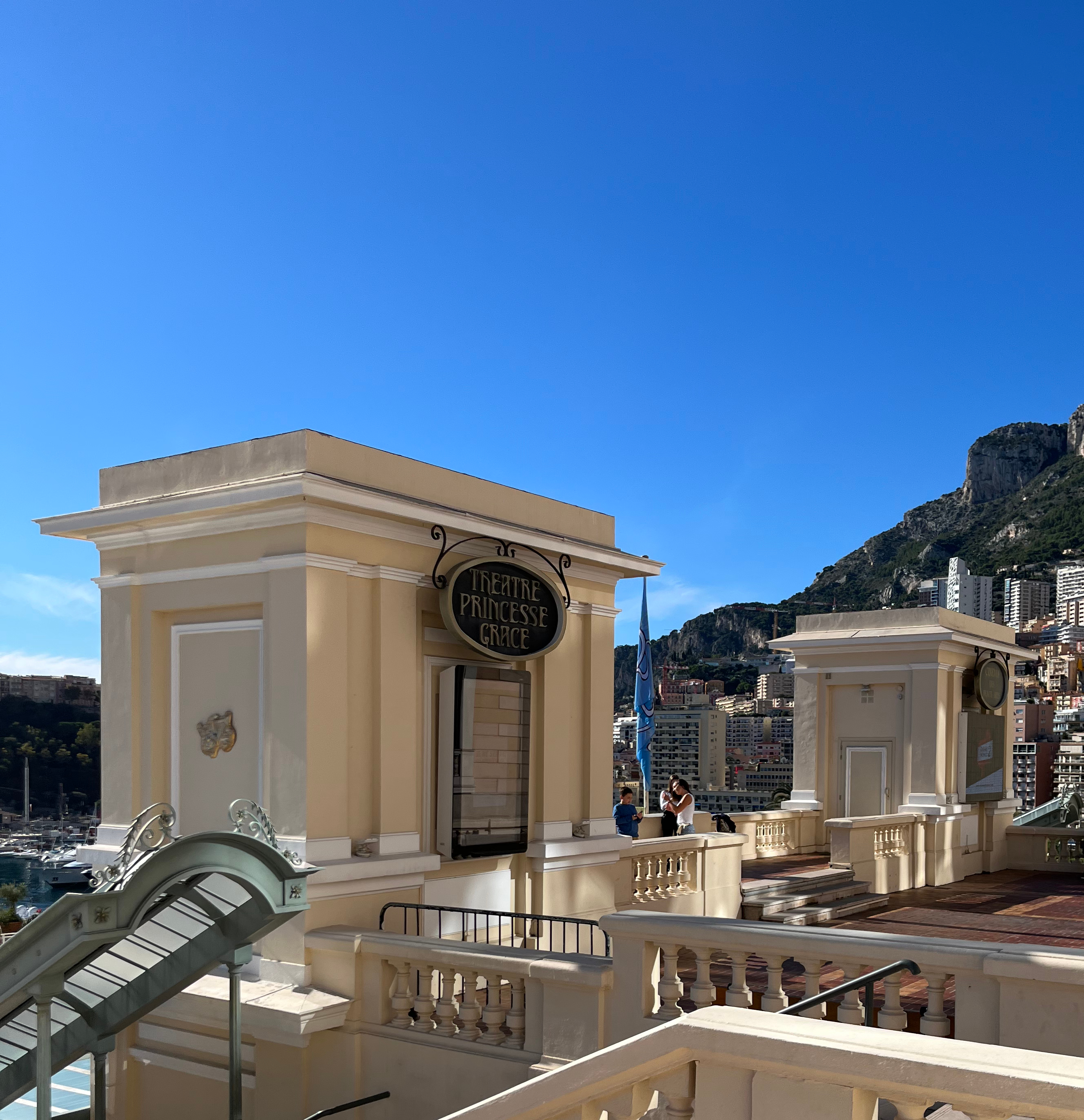
- Interactive map of Théâtre Princesse Grace
- Address: Monaco
- Coordinates: 43.7377°N 7.4260°E

Website
- tpgmonaco.mc

The Théâtre Princesse Grace is a theatre in Monaco.

== History ==
The theatre was dedicated on 17 December 1981 by Princess Grace, who designed the interior decoration. In 2011, the Monegasque royal family celebrated its 30th anniversary. Its current president is her daughter, Princess Stéphanie of Monaco.
