= Schizophonia (Rinôçérôse album) =

Studio album by Rinôçérôse
- Released: 3 October 2005
- Genre: Electronic
- Label: V2 Records

Rinôçérôse chronology
Music Kills Me (2002)	Schizophonia (2005)	Rinôçérôse (2006)

Singles from Schizophonia
- 1. "Cubicle" Released: 17 August 2005

Schizophonia is a 2005 album by Rinôçérôse.

== Track listing ==
1. "Get Over It Now"
2. "Stop It Already"
3. "Bitchtits"
4. "Friction Dancer"
5. "Skin"
6. "Pleasure and Pain"
7. "My Demons"
8. "Cubicle"
9. "Fucky Music" (Motorcycle Boy Version)
10. "Fahr Zur Hölle"
11. "323 Secondes de Silence Répétitif Sans Guitare Espagnole"
12. "Fucky Music" (Live)
