= L'art des femmes =

Studio album by Jeanne Mas
- Released: October 1990
- Recorded: 1990; Studio Davout, Paris; Musika Studios, Paris; The Sound Castle, Los Angeles
- Genre: Pop music
- Length: 48:16
- Label: EMI
- Producers: Piero Calabrese, Jeanne Mas

Jeanne Mas chronology
Les crises de l'âme (1989)	L'art des femmes (1990)	Au nom des rois (1992)

Singles from L'art des femmes
- 1. "Shakespeare " Released: October 1990; 2. "L'art des femmes (Angela) " Released: January 1991

L'art des femmes is the fourth studio album by French pop singer Jeanne Mas, released in 1990.

== Track listing ==
1. "L'amour du mal" (Jeanne Mas, Massimo Calabrese, Piero Calabrese, Roberto Zaneli) – 5:23
2. "Le contrechamp" (J. Mas, M. Calabrese, P. Calabrese, R. Zaneli) – 4:34
3. "Elle est moi" (J. Mas, M. Calabrese, P. Calabrese, R. Zaneli) – 4:55
4. "Les bras en croix" (J. Mas, M. Calabrese, P. Calabrese, R. Zaneli) – 5:05
5. "Les rêves de Maud" (J. Mas, M. Calabrese, P. Calabrese, R. Zaneli) – 4:27
6. "Tous les cris les S.O.S." (Daniel Balavoine) – 5:41
7. "Shakespeare" (J. Mas) – 4:30
8. "L'alba" (J. Mas, P. Calabrese) – 4:27
9. "L'art des femmes (Angela)" (J. Mas, M. Calabrese, P. Calabrese, R. Zaneli) – 3:49
10. "Alexandre M." (J. Mas, M. Calabrese, P. Calabrese, R. Zaneli) – 5:22
- "L'amour du mal" contains an extract of Charles Baudelaire's poem "L'albatros"

== Album credits ==
=== Personnel ===
- Jeanne Mas - vocals
- Marco Rinalduzzi - guitar
- Tony Levin - bass guitar, Chapman stick
- Piero Calabrese - keyboards, programming
- Christophe Deschamps - drums

=== Production ===
- Producers - Piero Calabrese, Jeanne Mas
- Arrangements - Piero Calabrese
- Engineer - Marco Lecci
- Assistant - Manu, Philippe, Bob
- Management - Christian Blanchard
- Assistant management - Christine Sterlay

=== Design ===
- Photography - Paul Bella, Bernard Mouillon
- Cover design - Jeanne Mas, Créature
