= J'accuse (album) =

Studio album by Damien Saez
- Released: March 29, 2010
- Recorded: 2009–2010
- Genre: French rock
- Length: 65:00
- Label: Wagram Music

Damien Saez chronology
Varsovie - L'Alhambra - Paris (2008)	J'accuse (2010)	Messina (2012)

Singles from J'accuse
- 1. "J'accuse" Released: 2010; 2. "Pilule" Released: 2010

J'accuse is an album by French singer-songwriter Damien Saez released in 2010 on Wagram Music label.

== Singles ==
The track "J'accuse" was released as a first single prior to release of the album and reached #14 in Ultratop 50 Belgian Singles Chart (Wallonia), staying 9 weeks in the singles chart. In French the song was made available as a free download.

A second track, "Pilule" was released as well.

== Track listing ==
1. "Les Anarchitectures" (“The anarchytectures”) (2:48)
2. "Pilule" (“Pill”) (5:18)
3. "Cigarette" (4:13)
4. "Des p'tits sous" (“Small cash”) (3:58)
5. "Sonnez tocsin dans les campagnes" (“Ring the tocsin in the countryside”) (4:51)
6. "J'accuse" (“I accuse”) (4:28)
7. "Lula" (4:05)
8. "Regarder les filles pleurer" (“To watch the girls cry”) (5:05)
9. "Regarder les filles pleurer (thème)" (“To watch the girls cry (Theme)”) (8:47)
10. "Les Cours des lycées" (“The high[-]schools yards”) (3:56)
11. "Les Printemps" (“Springs”) (5:14)
12. "Marguerite" (4:52)
13. "On a tous une Lula" (“We all have a Lula”) (3:39)
14. "Tricycle jaune" (“Yellow Tricycle”) (3:46)

== Personnel ==
- Damien Saez – vocals, guitar
- Thomas Coeuriot – guitar
- Cédric Leroux – guitar
- Franck Phan – guitar
- James Eller – bass
- Max Garoute – drums

== Charts ==
Chart (2010)	Peak position
Belgium (Wallonia) Albums Chart	7
French Albums Chart	3
Swiss Albums Chart	25
