= Jeanne Mas =

French pop singer

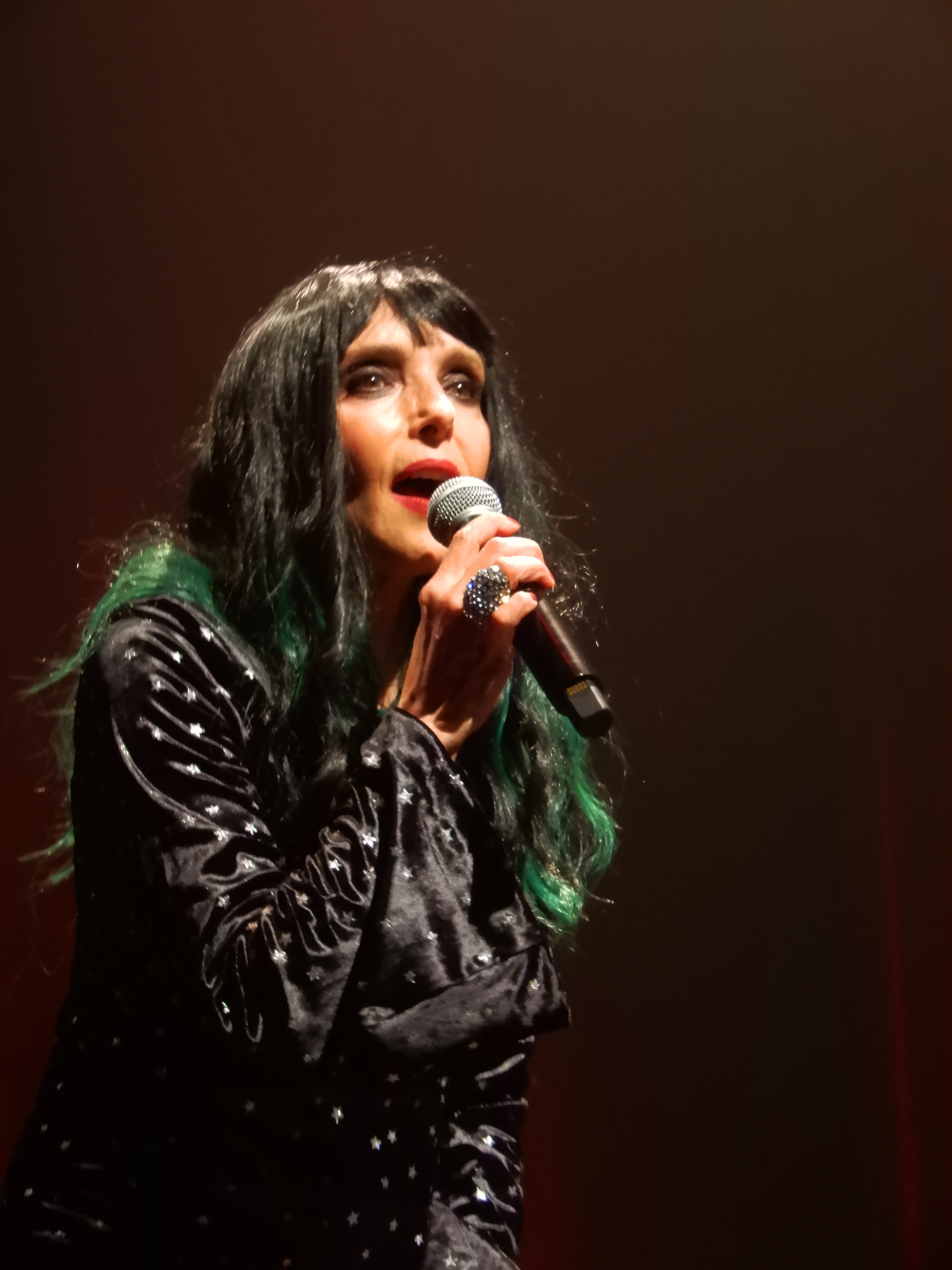
- Mas performing in May 2022

Background information
- Born: Jeanne Marie Mas; 28 February 1958 (age 68); Alicante, Spain
- Genres: Pop; electropop; rock
- Occupation: Singer
- Years active: 1978–present
- Labels: Pathé Marconi; EMI; AB Productions; Arcade Music; XIII Bis Records; Red Rocks Productions
- Website: jeannemas.com

Jeanne Mas (born 28 February 1958) is a French pop singer. She is well known in France, Switzerland, Canada and Belgium for a number of hit singles released in the 1980s. Her first success was "Toute première fois" in 1984. This song was simultaneously released in the United Kingdom in English. Two of her singles charted at number one in France: "Johnny, Johnny" and "En rouge et noir" in 1985 and 1986, respectively. Her 1980's albums are good examples of the Euro disco electropop style popular in Continental Europe at the time, featuring synthesizers and very catchy melodies.

== Biography ==
Jeanne Mas was born on 28 February 1958 in Alicante, Spain. She started studying languages at the University of Nanterre (near Paris). After one year studying Spanish and Italian, she took off for Italy giving up her studies at the university. She settled in Rome when she was only 18 years old. In Rome, she took dance and acting classes. She started landing small parts in commercials as well as in full-length films and she hosted her own show on a private channel: La Uomo TV. Music was her true passion.

In 1979, she signed her first contract with RCA Italia and recorded her first single "On the Moon", and toured with a rock group which was rather hardcore. She recorded several 45's, one in English and the others in Italian. In 1984, she signed a contract with EMI Music France. Roberto Zaneli and Romano Musumarra wrote the music for her first French hit "Toute première fois".

=== First time (1984–1985) ===
"Toute première fois" was an instant success: she sold more than 900,000 copies of the single which was played on the radio all the way until December.

French people discovered a young woman on their TV screen entirely dressed in black, with jet-black hair, an emaciated face, and very pronounced make-up: a bland version of the punk look. Stimulating choreography with jerky gestures reinforced the image of a woman "who wants some action", almost aggressive. This striking combination of dance and image seduced the young public. The press, the radio, the television and even the discos grabbed hold of this phenomenon.

At the start of the following year, she successively released a second single "Johnny, Johnny" followed by an album simply called Jeanne Mas. To reach a wider audience, she asked Daniel Balavoine for help. He produced two of the songs for the album.

Another single "Coeur en stéréo" was a hit in its own right. In October, she played the Olympia club in Paris for the first time for four triumphant concerts. A few weeks later, she won the equivalent of a grammy for female performer of the year during the first Victoires de la musique.

=== Triumphant Olympia (1986) ===
Building upon this success, ravaging and full of energy, she locked herself in a studio in Denmark to record her next album. Heavily into her work, she'd already started writing her own lyrics. Jeanne Mas had a critical view on music and knew what she wanted. This is why she refused a song written by Musumarra which would become "Ouragan" interpreted by the gloss and glitter Princess Stephanie of Monaco. At the beginning of 1986, she released her second album Femmes d'aujourd'hui which went on to sell over 1 million copies. The single from the album "En Rouge et Noir" quickly became a hit. In June, the album and the single were number one on the French charts. In the autumn, she played for seven days at the Palais des Sports in Paris and continued with forty concert dates in the rest of France.

=== Bercy (1987–1989) ===
This tour commenced in March 1987 for twenty dates, one of which was a concert in Lyon where a live record and a ninety-minute film were made. She then decided to take a break and take advantage of this time to return to Italy to have a baby, a little girl named Victoria. 1988 allowed her to look closely at her career, her artistic doubts. In September she got involved publicly for a subject that she held close to her heart, crimes against children.

Jeanne nevertheless didn't stay inactive and got back to work quickly with Piero Calabrese. She went into a studio for three months and chose the best musicians for the recording: Manu Katché on drums, Steve Shehan on percussion, Tony Levin on bass and David Rhodes on guitar. In February 1989 a new album titled Les crises de l'âme was released. The lyrics seemed more committed with songs like "J'accuse", "Tango" or still "Y'a des bons..." which denounced violence in the world. In September, she played at Bercy. However, the subsequent tour was cancelled and this was the beginning of her decline.

=== Los Angeles trip and declining years (1990–1995) ===
Far from letting herself be beaten, the singer gathered her team to write a new album at the beginning of 1990. Recorded in Los Angeles, L'art des femmes came out in October. She recorded "Tous les cris les S.O.S." by Daniel Balavoine. EMI promoted the first single, "Shakespeare", but both the album and singles were complete flops. A year later, EMI released a compilation Depuis la toute première fois. In 1992, Jeanne Mas gave birth to a boy, Christopher. Au nom des rois was the new album which came out on AB Productions in September, her collaboration with EMI having ended. The first single from the album was "Au nom des rois" and she directed the video. "Dors bien Margot" followed a few months later with a slightly different mix. 1993 saw the release of a new version of the album including three new songs, one of which was the third single "Aime-moi". In September 1993, she played three nights at Casino de Paris and followed with a fifty-five-date tour. With her career floundering she withdrew from public life for a while and settled in the South of France. In 1994 "C'est pas normal", a more dance floor-oriented song, was released but interest was minimal, received limited airplay and was another flop.

=== Rocker (1996–2002) ===
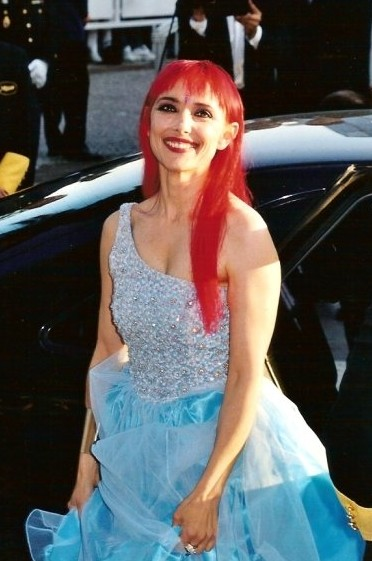
Jeanne Mas at Cannes, 2001

She came back in 1996 with a new album on Arcade records. Jeanne recorded Jeanne Mas & les Égoïstes in Toulouse which had 14 songs that she had written, more rock so as to a return to her initial roots. The record received little attention.

After this attempted comeback, Jeanne Mas, became interested in cinema and took screen a writing course in Paris. She also made a short film. By 2000 the record company XIII Bis enabled her to release a further album. Désir d'insolence her seventh album. Amongst the songs, three have texts by the poets Paul Verlaine, Alfred de Vigny and Guillaume Appolinaire's "Le pont Mirabeau".

In 2003, Jeanne Mas released a new album: Les Amants de Castille in hommage to the famous play Le Cid by Corneille. In 2004–2005 she toured to celebrate her 20 years of career and performed at the Espace Pierre Cardin and the Casino de Paris.

Jeanne Mas left France in June 2005 and settled in California where she created her own label Red Rocks Productions. In 2006 a new album : The missing Flowers was recorded between Paris and Los Angeles and produced with DJ Esteban. A new chapter commenced with this new album and a new look. Blond hair and feminine. In 2007: the album was released in Europe by Edina Music France.

=== 2008 Concert and her renewed popularity ===
In June 2008, Jeanne Mas announced four nights of concerts at the Trianon in Paris.

=== 2009 Olympia Theatre – Paris, France ===
In May 2009, Jeanne Mas performed two nights at the Olympia Theatre in Paris with her band – Mike Pachelli & Willis Clow (guitars), Todd Connelly (bass), Matt Lesser (drums) and Balint Sapszon (keyboards).

In July 2011, Jeanne Mas released her 13th album, Bleu Citron, with a single, Les Dimanches being well received by critics.

In 2012, she released the album Made in France, which received a mixed reception. From this the single Il pleut des lunes, and EP dance Gil with DJ Esteban was released.

On 24 October 2012, Jeanne Mas was back on the big screen with the film Stars 80, which tells the story of the two producers of the tour RFM Party 80. The film was a box office success.

On 10 August 2013, Jeanne Mas began a tour of seven dates in Obernai in Alsace, ending in Romans 28 September.

== Personal life ==
Jeanne Mas has a daughter and a son. In 2005, she relocated from Rueil-Malmaison, France to the United States, firstly in California and then in Arizona.

As of 2016, Jeanne Mas has been vegetarian for twenty-three years, before becoming a vegan. In February 2016, Mas published the book Ma vie est une pomme ("My life is an apple") under Michel Lafon, which advocates the lifestyle.

== Discography ==
=== Studio albums ===
- Jeanne Mas (1985)
- Femmes d'aujourd'hui (1986)
- Les crises de l'âme (1989)
- L'art des femmes (1990)
- Au nom des rois (1992)
- Jeanne Mas & Les Égoïstes (1996)
- Désir D'Insolence (2000)
- Je Vous Aime ainsi (2001)
- Les Amants De Castille (2003)
- The Missing Flowers (2006)
- Be West (2008)
- Bleu Citron (2011)
- Made in France (2012)
- H2-Eau (2014)
- PH (2017)

=== Live albums ===
- En concert (1987)

=== Compilation albums ===
- Depuis la toute première fois (1991)
- Les plus grands succès de Jeanne Mas (1996)
- L'essentiel (2000)
- J'M – Le meilleur de Jeanne Mas (2001)
- Best of (2004)
- Most of the best (2006)
- My 80's (2007)
- The Flowers Collection (2009)
- Divas Wanted (2010)

=== Singles ===
- 1978 : On The Moon
- 1984 : Toute Première Fois
- 1985 : Johnny, Johnny
- 1985 : Coeur En Stereo
- 1986 : En Rouge Et Noir
- 1986 : L'Enfant
- 1987 : Sauvez-Moi
- 1987 : La Bête Libre
- 1989 : Y'a Des Bons...
- 1989 : Les Crises De L'Âme (Only in Germany and Italia)
- 1989 : J'Accuse
- 1989 : Carolyne
- 1990 : Bébé Rock
- 1990 : Shakespeare
- 1991 : Angela (L'Art Des Femmes)
- 1992 : Au Nom Des Rois
- 1992 : Dors Bien Margot
- 1993 : Aime-Moi
- 1994 : C'Est Pas Normal
- 1996 : Côté H Côté Clean
- 1997 : Anna
- 2000 : Désir D'Insolence
- 2001 : Je Vous Aime Ainsi
- 2003 : Chimène
- 2003 : Poussière De Castille
- 2004 : Toute Première Fois (FDP Remix)
- 2005 : Johnny, Johnny (Remix)
- 2005 : The New Medley
- 2006 : Màs Allí, Màs Allà
- 2006 : On A Summer Day
- 2007 : Un Air D'Argentine
- 2007 : C'Est Interdit
- 2007 : Come To Los Angeles
- 2007 : Sans Toi
- 2008 : Be West
- 2009 : Back to the Future
- 2009 : Maudit
- 2010 : It Could Be
- 2010 : Si Long, Trop Court
- 2012 : Gil
- 2014 : Pablo
- 2014 : Les Lunes

== Filmography ==
- Porca società (1978)
- Caro papà (1979)
- Ricomincio da tre (1981)
- Il cavaliere, la morte e il diavolo (1985)
- Malone (TV episode Génération braqueurs) (2003)
- L'instit (TV episode Privé d'école) (2004)
- Stars 80 (2012)
