= Romano Musumarra =

Italian composer, arranger, musician and record producer

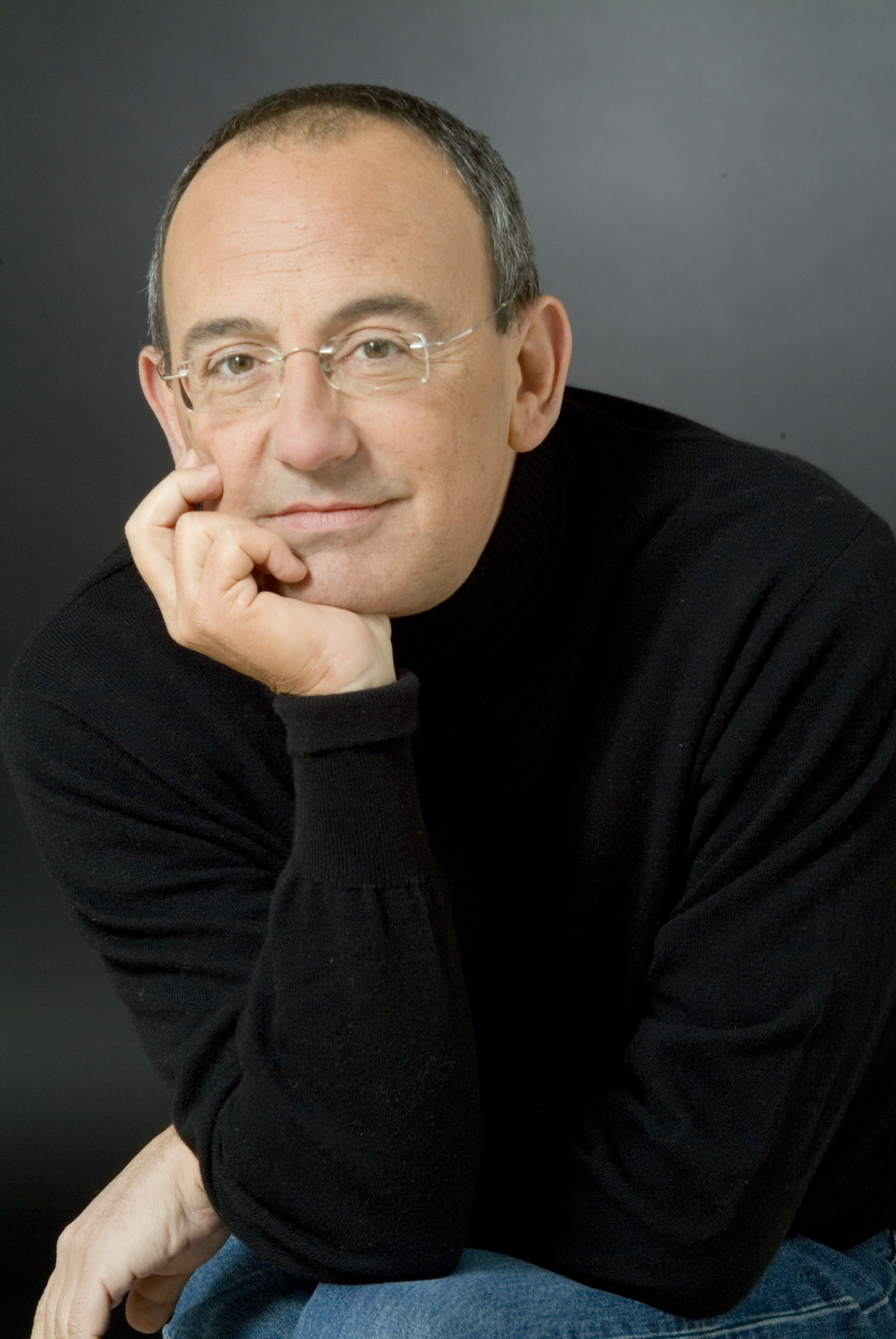
- Born: 21 July 1956 (age 69); Rome, Italy
- Occupation: Composer

Romano Musumarra (born 21 July 1956) is an Italian composer, arranger, musician and record producer.

== Life and career ==
Born in Rome, Musumarra approached music as a child, learning to play pipe organ at his church. He studied piano, composition and conducting at the Accademia Nazionale di Santa Cecilia, and in 1975 he formed the melodic pop-rock group La Bottega dell'Arte, with whom he achieved some significant success throughout the 1970s. Besides his work with the band, in 1978 he made an electronic album called Automat together with Claudio Gizzi.

In 1983 he left La Bottega dell'Arte and devoted himself to the activity of arranger and composer, arranging among others works by Riccardo Cocciante, Mango, Fred Bongusto and Franco Califano, and composing the music for Severino Gazzelloni's album Azzurra.

In 1984, after listening to an audition of her, he asked to newcomer Jeanne Mas to record one of his compositions, "Toute Première Fois". After hearing the song, which featured an unusual mix of acoustic and electronic sounds for the time, EMI signed Mas and the resulting single was a great success in France, reaching the number eight on the singles chart. Musumarra continued his collaboration with Mas, composing and producing the tracks on her first two albums, including "Johnny, Johnny" and "En rouge et noir", both number one in the French chart.

Due to the success of his work with Jeanne Mas he was increasingly in demand by French artists, so at the end of 1985 he decided to move to France. In 1986 he contributed to the musical success of Princess Stéphanie of Monaco, for whom he composed the hits "Ouragan" (initially proposed to Jeanne Mas) and "Flash/One Love to Give". The same year he made his debut as a film score composer with Régis Wargnier's The Woman of My Life and was instrumental in launching Elsa Lunghini (then simply Elsa), for whom he wrote and produced the debut single "T'en va pas", number one in the French charts for two months.

In addition to launching new names, Musumarra has composed songs for established artists such as Celine Dion, Mireille Mathieu, Sylvie Vartan, Alain Delon, Nikka Costa, Dana Dawson, Hélène Ségara, Tina Arena, Régine, Garou, Bruno Pelletier, and Marc Lavoine.

Since the 2000s, he has dedicated himself to composing songs in the operatic pop genre, collaborating with Luciano Pavarotti, Il Divo, Katherine Jenkins, Alessandro Safina, Vittorio Grigolo, among others. In 2016, his song "On écrit sur les murs", originally composed for Demis Roussos, reached number three in the French hit parade thanks to a cover by the group Kids United.

== Selected filmography ==
- The Woman of My Life (1986)
- My True Love, My Wound (1987)
- Maladie d'amour (1987)
- Faceless (1988)
- L'enfance de l'art (1988)
- Day of Atonement (1992)
- The Teddy Bear (1994)

== Honours ==
- 1988 - Knight of Arts and Letters
