= Princess Stéphanie of Monaco =

Monégasque princess (born 1965)

Princess Stéphanie
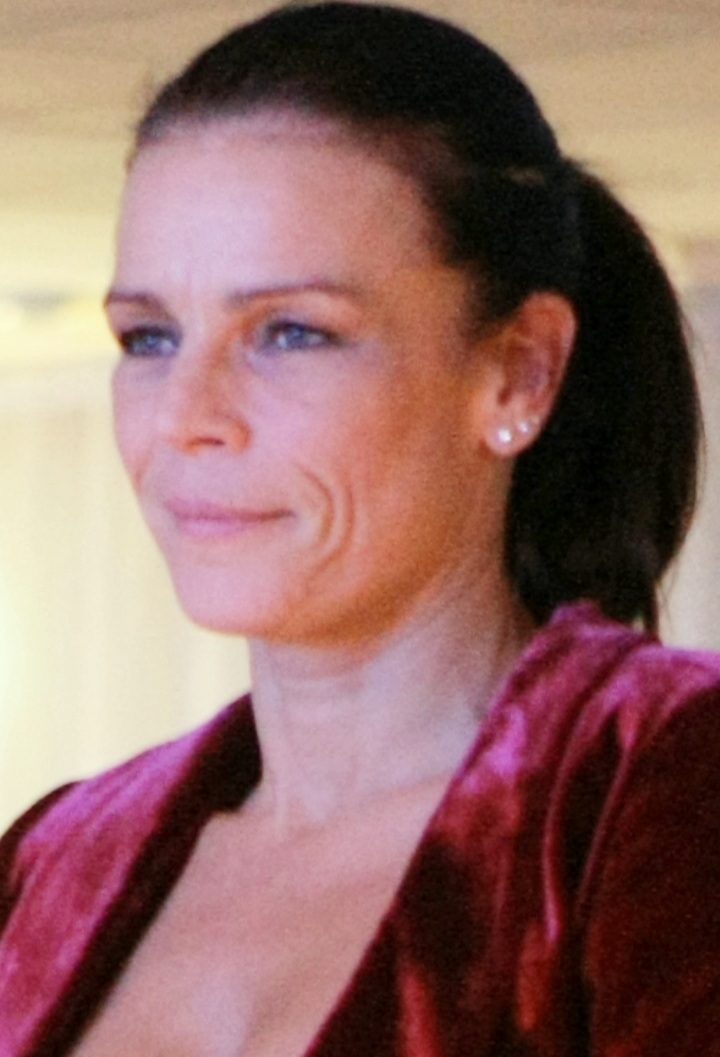
- Princess Stéphanie in 2013
- Born: 1 February 1965 (age 61); Prince's Palace, Monte Carlo, Monaco
- Spouse: Daniel Ducruet (m. 1995; div. 1996) Adans Lopez Peres (m. 2003; div. 2004)
- Issue: Louis Ducruet; Pauline Ducruet; Camille Gottlieb
Names
- Stéphanie Marie Elisabeth Grimaldi
- House: Grimaldi
- Father: Rainier III, Prince of Monaco
- Mother: Grace Kelly

Princess Stéphanie of Monaco (Stéphanie Marie Elisabeth Grimaldi; French pronunciation: [stefani maʁi elizabɛt ɡʁimaldi] born 1 February 1965) is the youngest child of Rainier III, Prince of Monaco, and his wife, American actress Grace Kelly. She is the younger sister of Albert II, Prince of Monaco, and Caroline. Currently 15th in the line of succession to the Monegasque throne, she has been a singer, swimwear designer, and fashion model.

== Early life and education ==
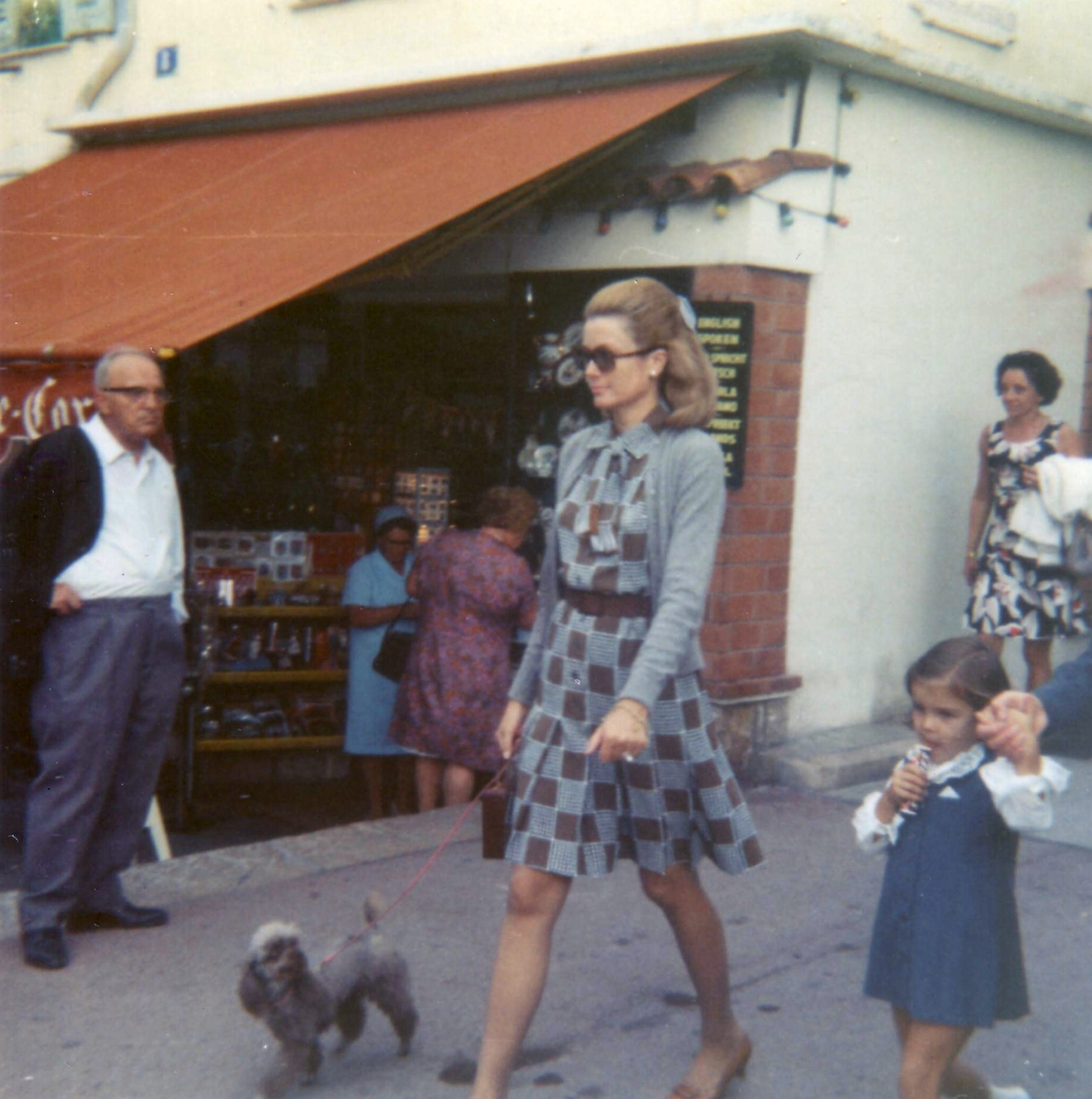
Princess Stéphanie walking with her mother in 1969

Stéphanie was born to Prince Rainier III and Princess Grace on 1 February 1965 at Prince's Palace in Monaco. She is the youngest of their three children. She has two older siblings, Caroline and Albert. Her godparents are her maternal uncle John B. Kelly Jr. and paternal first cousin Elisabeth-Anne de Massy. Her mother, who described Stephanie as a "warm, bright, amusing, intelligent and capable girl" and a "good athlete", lovingly called her "wild child" (French: enfant terrible).

On 13 September 1982, while returning home from their farm in Roc Agel, France, Stéphanie and her mother had a car accident. Grace died the next day, on 14 September, while Stéphanie sustained a hairline fracture of a neck vertebra.

Although the official report of the incident was that Grace suffered a stroke while driving, rumors began that Stéphanie, who had to miss her mother's funeral due to her recovery, was the one actually driving. Stéphanie herself refused to speak publicly about her mother's death until 1989, when she gave an interview to the author Jeffrey Robinson, insisting that the story was untrue. She said, "There was a lot of pressure on me because everyone was saying that I had been driving the car, that it was all my fault, that I'd killed my mother... It's not easy when you're 17 to live with that."

She did not discuss the subject again until a 2002 interview with the French magazine Paris Match in which she repeated her earlier denial, and discussed the trauma of being beside her mother at the time of the accident. She said, "Not only did I go through the horrible trauma of losing my mother at a very young age, but I was beside her at the moment of the accident. Nobody can imagine how much I've suffered, and still suffer."

Princess Stéphanie was educated at the Dames de Saint-Maur in Monaco, and then at the école and collège Dupanloup in Boulogne-Billancourt, France. Stéphanie earned her baccalauréat from the Cours Charles de Foucauld in 1982. During her school years, she studied classical dance and piano, and competed in gymnastics and horse riding. She also attended Camp Oneka, an all-girls' summer camp in the Pocono Mountains, in the United States, where her sister and mother both had previously attended.

== Career ==
=== Fashion ===
In 1983, after her physical recovery from the accident that killed her mother, Stéphanie started an apprentice programme at Christian Dior under the direction of head designer Marc Bohan. The following year, she debuted as a model on the biannual haute couture special published by Spanish magazine ¡Hola!, a venture that she repeated in 1990. In 1985, Stéphanie appeared on the cover of German Vogue magazine and the American publication Vanity Fair. She also became the spokeswoman of the Swiss beauty line La Prairie, for which she was photographed by Horst, and she appeared on the cover of French Vogue, photographed by Helmut Newton in September 1986.

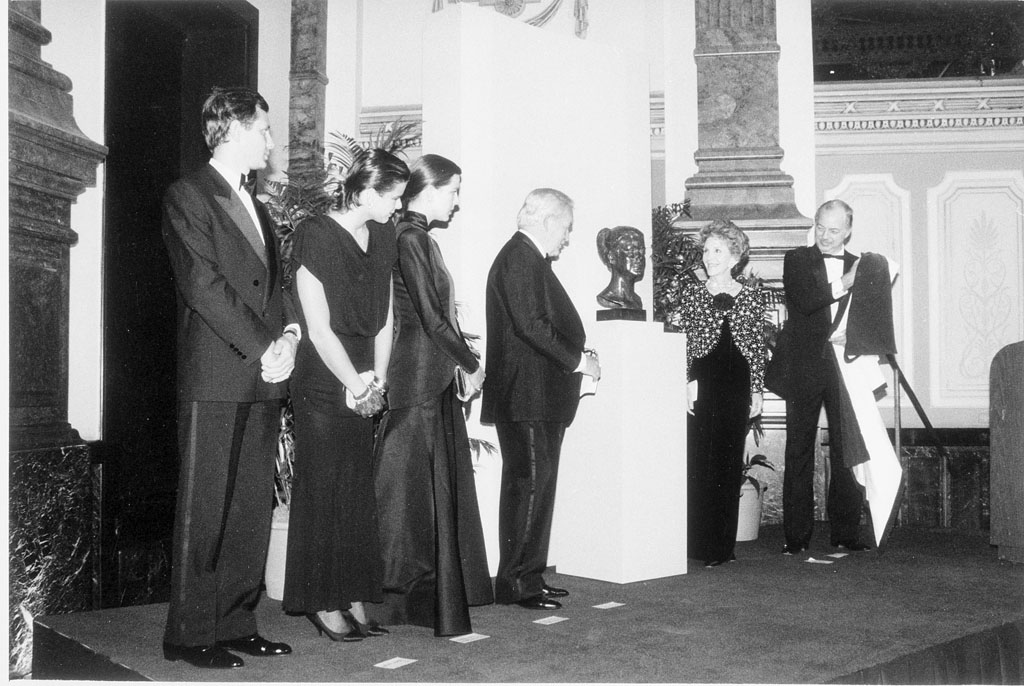
Dignitaries gather at the National Portrait Gallery in October 1986 for the presentation of a portrait head of Princess Grace of Monaco by her family. Includes (l-r): Stefano Casiraghi, Princess Stephanie, Princess Caroline, Prince Ranier III, First Lady Nancy Reagan and Secretary Robert Adams.

In 1986, Stéphanie launched a swimwear line Pool Position with Alix de la Comble, whom she had met during her internship at Dior. The fashion show to present the line, held at the Sporting Club in Monaco and attended by her father, Prince Rainier, and siblings Caroline and Albert, was a major event covered by the worldwide media. In 1989, Stéphanie launched her own eponymous perfume.

Stéphanie co-owns Replay cafes and stores in both Monaco and Barcelona. In December 2008, she was guest-editor of Vogue Paris and appeared on the magazine's cover.

=== Musical career ===
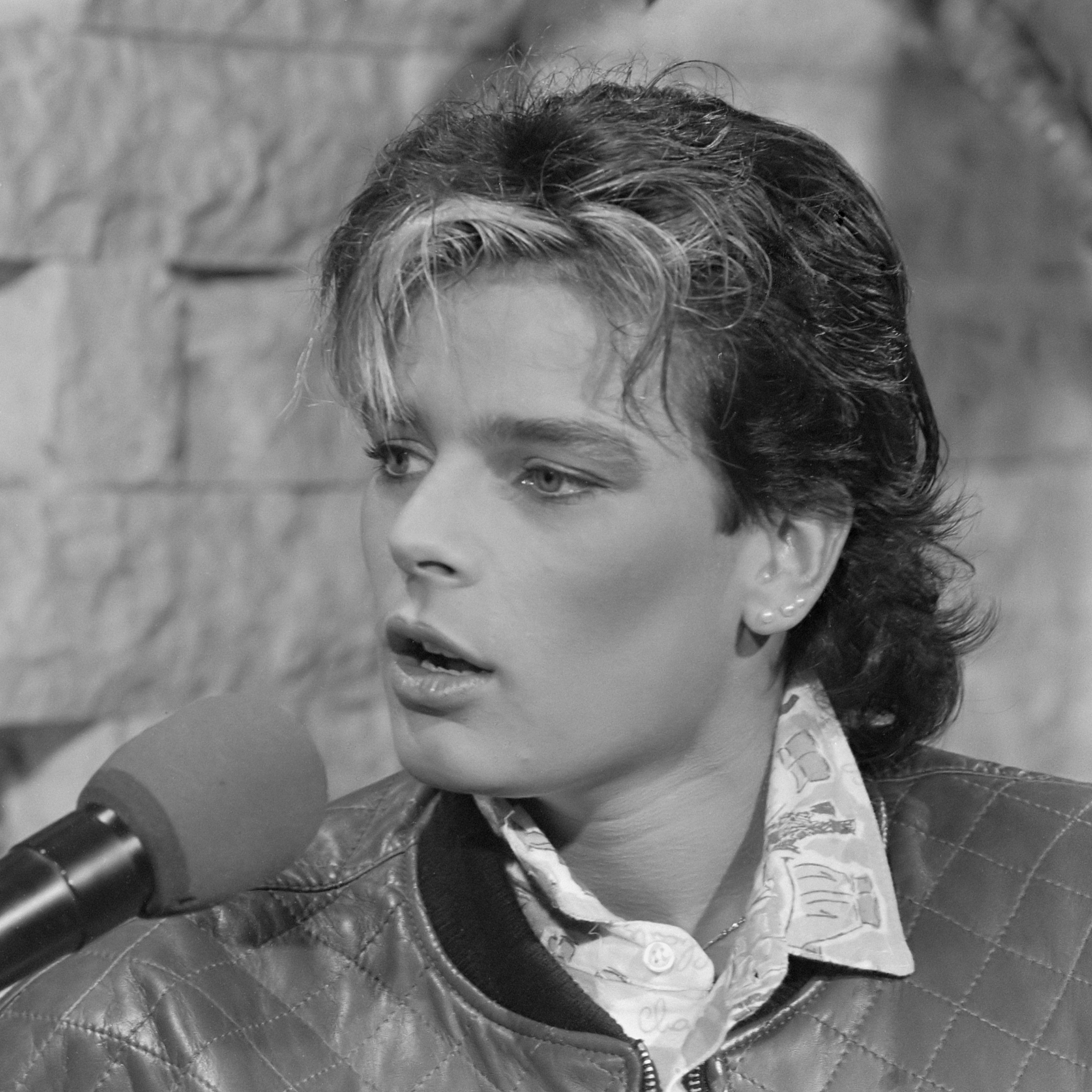
Stéphanie in 1986

In February 1986, Stéphanie released her first single with the French label Carrere, under the production of Yves Roze. The song "Ouragan" and its English version "Irresistible" were both international hits, reportedly selling more than 2 million copies. The full album Besoin, released as Stéphanie in some countries, sold more than 1.5 million, with 100,000 in France. The single "Flash", as well as its English version "One Love to Give," also achieved success throughout Europe. In January 1987, Stéphanie released the single "Young Ones Everywhere" to benefit UNICEF.

The same year, Stéphanie moved to Los Angeles to record a new album. However, it took her five years to release it. The album Stéphanie, released in 1991, met with disappointing sales and negative reviews, despite the promotional tour that included a performance on The Oprah Winfrey Show. Stéphanie then ended her music career after recording "In the Closet" with Michael Jackson for his album Dangerous. The song became a worldwide hit and reached the top 10 in the United States but Stéphanie was credited on the single under the alias "Mystery Girl" and her involvement in the song was not revealed until a few years later. She made a brief return to singing in 2006, when she recorded "L'Or de nos vies", a charity single, along with her foundation Fight AIDS.

=== Philanthropy and patronages ===
Stéphanie is the president of several associations, including Monaco Youth Centre and Princess Stéphanie Activity Centre, and is an honorary board member of the Princess Grace Foundation – United States. She has also been the patron of the International Circus Festival of Monte-Carlo, which she regularly attends, and the World Association of Children's Friends (AMADE), which was founded in 1963 by her mother. Since 1985, Stéphanie has been the president of the Monte-Carlo Magic Grand Prix and the International Festival of Amateur Theatre. She is also the president of the Théâtre Princesse Grace.

In 2003, Stéphanie created her own Women Face the AIDS Association, which became Fight AIDS Monaco in 2004, in order to support people living with HIV and to combat the social stigma attached to the disease. Since 2006, Stéphanie has been a Joint United Nations Programme on HIV/AIDS (UNAIDS) ambassador. The same year, along with the group of singers, she released a charitable single "L'Or de nos vies". On 26 June 2010, Stéphanie inaugurated, in the presence of Prince Albert, the House of Life (French: Maison de Vie) in Carpentras, Vaucluse, France, which offers both psychological and material aid to persons living with either HIV and AIDS and their families. Stéphanie has organised numerous events, such as auction sales, concerts and galas, to support her foundation.

== Personal life ==
Royal monogram of Princess Stéphanie

Stéphanie dated Paul Belmondo, Anthony Delon, Rob Lowe, Mario Oliver Jutard, and the late Jean-Yves Le Fur (1964-2024) before she began a relationship with her bodyguard Daniel Ducruet in 1992.

The couple have two children, Louis and Pauline Ducruet, born in 1992 and 1994 respectively, at Princess Grace Hospital Centre in Monaco. The children were included in the line of succession to the Monegasque throne when Stéphanie married Ducruet on 1 July 1995 at Monaco town hall. The couple divorced on 4 October 1996.

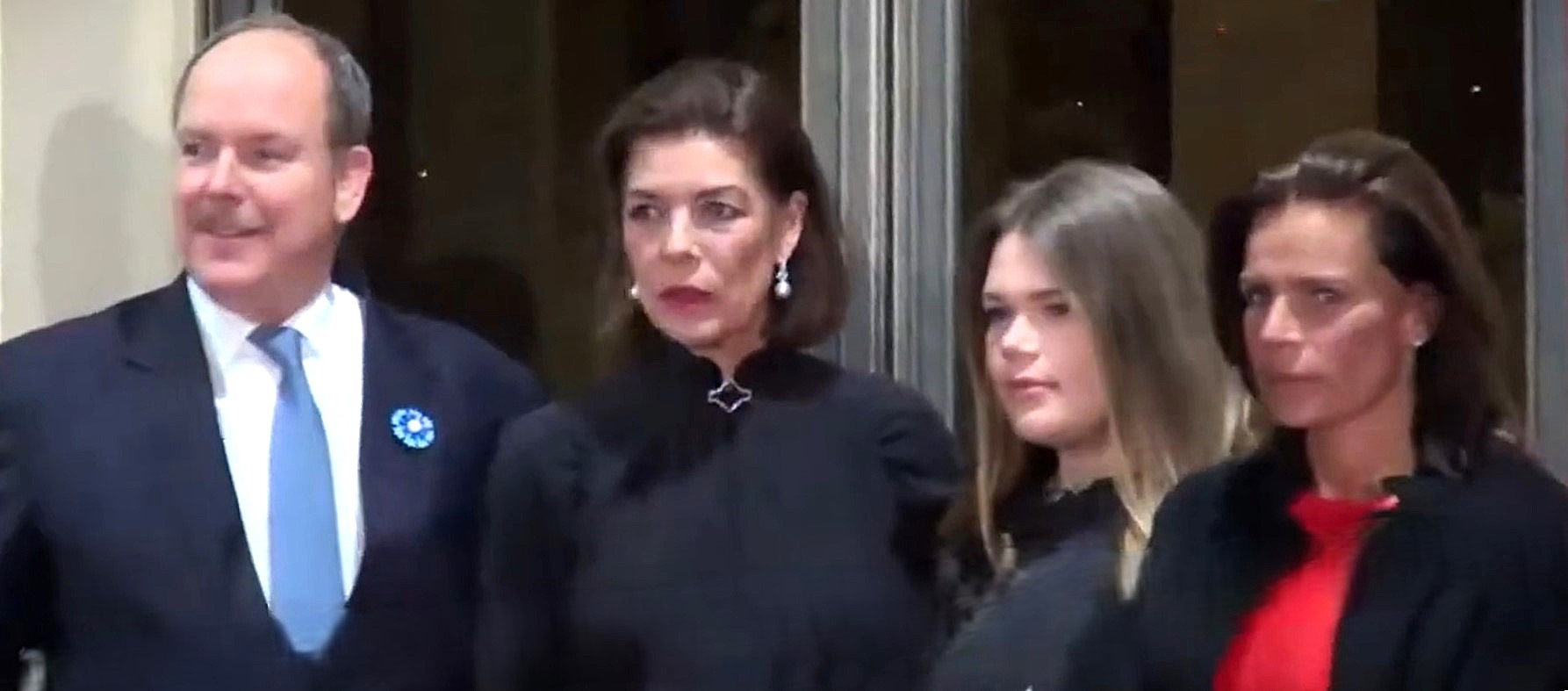
Left to right: Prince Albert, Princess Caroline, Camille Gottlieb, Princess Stéphanie at tribute to Grace Kelly in 2018

Stéphanie gave birth to her third child, Camille Gottlieb, on 15 July 1998 at Princess Grace Hospital Centre. Although she did not identify the father's name on the birth certificate, many suspected that Camille's father was her Head of Security Jean Raymond Gottlieb and Camille has acknowledged Gottlieb as her father. As her parents never married, Camille is not included in the line of succession to the Monegasque throne.

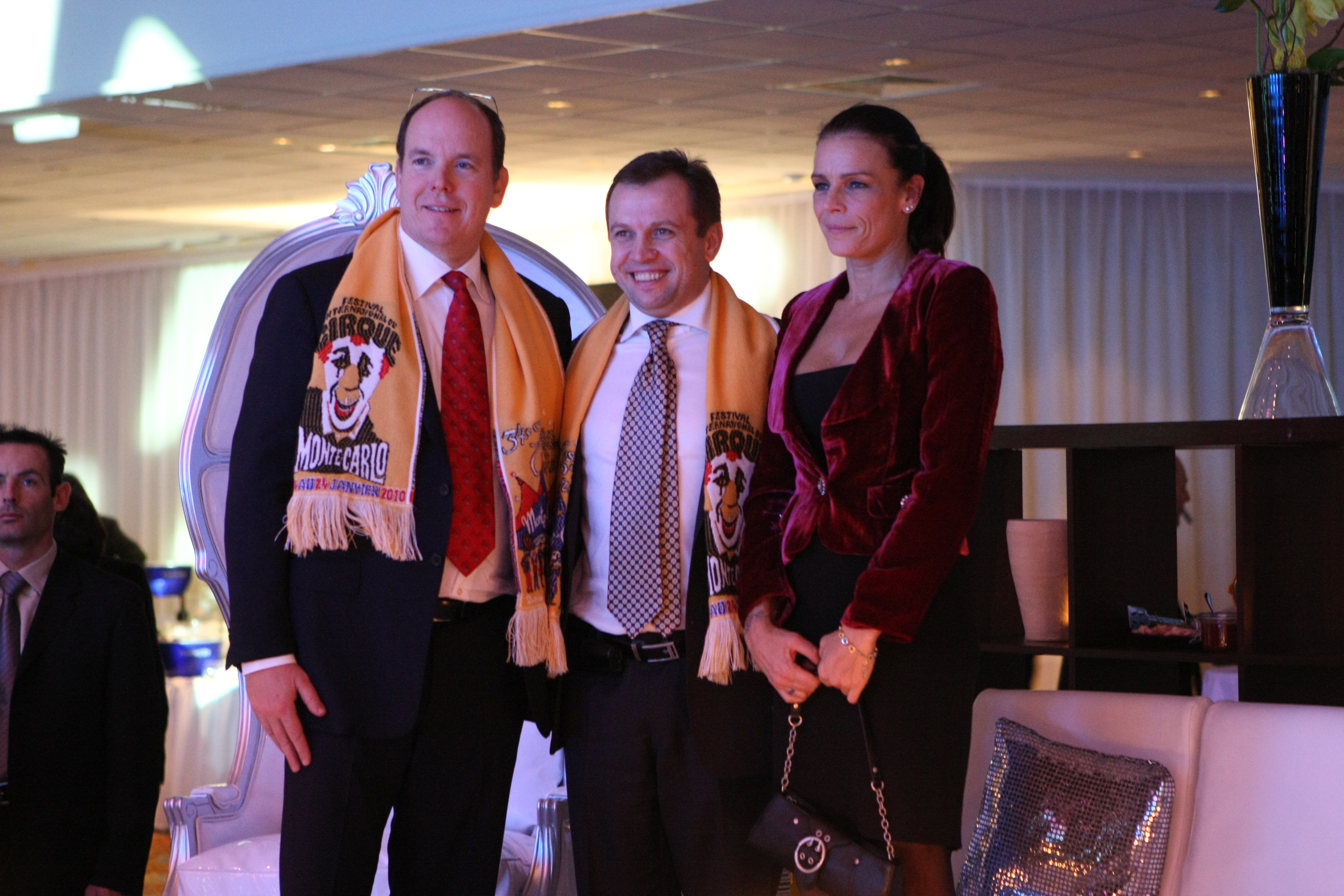
Stéphanie and her brother Albert (far left) in August 2013

In 2001, Stéphanie began a relationship with married elephant trainer Franco Knie and moved, along with her three children, into Knie's circus caravan. However, that relationship came to an end in 2002, and Stéphanie and her family returned to Monaco. On 12 September 2003, she married Portuguese acrobat Adans Lopez Peres, a member of Knie's circus ensemble. The marriage ended in divorce on 24 November 2004.

Stéphanie is the godmother to Andrea Casiraghi, the eldest son of her sister Princess Caroline, and to Alexandre Grimaldi-Coste.

== Discography ==
=== Studio albums ===
Year	Album	Chart			
Year	Album	FR	GER	AUT	SWE
1986	Besoin; Released: 1986; Label: Julisa/Carrere	6	12	59	6
1991	Stéphanie; Released: 1991; Label: WTG/Epic	48	—	—	—

=== Compilation albums ===
Year	Album	Chart			
Year	Album	FR	GER	AUT	SWE
2011	Collection Référence 80 – Le meilleur des Années 80; Released: 2011; Label: LM Music	—	—	—	—

=== Singles ===
Year	Single	Chart							Album
Year	Single	FR	SUI	GER	AUT	SWE	NOR	UK	Album
1986	"Ouragan/Irresistible"	1	11	2	5	—	—	84	Besoin
1986	"Flash/One Love to Give"	4	28	10	—	1	—	—	Besoin
1987	"Fleurs du mal"	16	—	—	—	—	—	—	Besoin
1987	"Live Your Life"	—	—	—	—	—	9	—	Besoin
1991	"Winds of Chance"	—	—	54	—	—	—	—	Stéphanie
1991	"You Don't Die from Love"	—	—	—	—	—	—	—	Stéphanie

=== Promotional singles ===
Year	Single	Chart							Album
Year	Single	FR	SUI	GER	AUT	SWE	NOR	UK	Album
1987	"Young Ones Everywhere"	—	—	—	—	—	—	—	Besoin

=== Featured singles ===
Year	Single	Chart															Album
Year	Single	US	Hot Dance	Hot R&B	UK	AUS	AUT	BEL	GER	FRA	ITA	NL	NOR	ESP	SWE	SUI	Album
1992	"In the Closet" (Michael Jackson featuring Stéphanie)	6	1	1	8	5	23	14	15	9	9	9	10	2	29	25	Dangerous
2006	"L'Or de nos vies" (as part of Fight AIDS)	—	—	—	—	—	—	14	—	5	—	—	—	—	—	43	Non-Album single

== Honours ==
=== National honours ===
- Monaco: Knight Grand Cross of the Order of Grimaldi
- Monaco: Knight Commander of the Order of Cultural Merit
- Monaco: Chancellor Recipient of the Monaco Red Cross Medal

=== Foreign honour ===
- France: Officer of the Order of the Legion of Honour (06/10/2025)

Princess Stéphanie of Monaco House of Grimaldi Born: 1 February 1965
Lines of succession
Preceded by Princess Alexandra of Hanover	Line of succession to the Monegasque throne 14th position	Succeeded by Louis Ducruet
