= 1987 in music =

This is a list of notable events in music that took place in the year 1987.

== Specific locations ==
- 1987 in British music
- 1987 in Japanese music
- 1987 in Norwegian music
- 1987 in Scandinavian music
- 1987 in South Korean music

== Specific genres ==
- 1987 in country music
- 1987 in heavy metal music
- 1987 in hip-hop music
- 1987 in jazz
- 1987 in progressive rock

== Events ==
=== January–February ===
- January 3 – Aretha Franklin becomes the first woman inducted into the Rock and Roll Hall of Fame in the United States. The other inductees this year consist of The Coasters, Eddie Cochran, Bo Diddley, Marvin Gaye, Bill Haley, Clyde McPhatter, Ricky Nelson, Roy Orbison, Carl Perkins, Smokey Robinson and Jackie Wilson.
- January 5 – Elton John, after several months of voice problems, undergoes throat surgery in an Australian hospital. The outcome would affect his voice permanently and he would soon start singing in a deep register.
- January 16 – Beastie Boys become the first act to be censored by American Bandstand.
- January 24 – Steve "Silk" Hurley's innovative "Jack Your Body" becomes the first house music record to top the UK singles chart.
- February 6 – Sonny Bono announces his candidacy for mayor of Palm Springs, California.
- February 14
  - Bon Jovi's "Livin' on a Prayer" reaches #1 in the USA. It would be 1987's biggest hit song worldwide.
  - Los Angeles radio station KMET signs off after nineteen years on the air. The station had been a pioneer of underground progressive rock programming.
- February 15 – Video Hits is first broadcast on Australian television.
- February 24 – The 29th Annual Grammy Awards are presented in Los Angeles, hosted by Billy Crystal. Paul Simon's Graceland wins Album of the Year, Steve Winwood's "Higher Love" wins Record of the Year and Dionne Warwick's cover of "That's What Friends Are For", featuring Elton John, Gladys Knight and Stevie Wonder, wins Song of the Year. Bruce Hornsby & the Range win Best New Artist.
- February 26 – The first four Beatles albums, Please Please Me, With the Beatles, A Hard Day's Night and Beatles for Sale are released on compact disc. Capitol Records decides to release the original UK mixes of the Beatles albums, which means that the first four CDs are released in mono. This marks the first time that many of these mono mixes are available in the US.

=== March–April ===
- March 9 — The career that would end in an infamous appearance at The Brit awards and the burning of a million pounds began in Britain, as The Justified Ancients of Mu Mu release their debut single, "All You Need Is Love".
- March 13
  - Bob Seger and the Silver Bullet Band receive a star on the Hollywood Walk of Fame.
  - In the US, Bryan Adams' "Heat of the Night" becomes the first single to be commercially released on cassette. Cassette singles become known as cassingles.
- March 27 – Inspired by The Beatles' 1969 rooftop concert, U2 shoots a music video for the song "Where the Streets Have No Name" on a rooftop in Los Angeles.
- April 23 — Carole King sues the owner of her record company, Lou Adler, claiming that she is owed more than $400,000 in royalties. King also asks for rights to her old recordings.

=== May–August ===
- May 9 – Ireland's Johnny Logan wins the Eurovision Song Contest, held in Brussels, Belgium, with the song "Hold Me Now", making him the first artist to win the contest twice. The song tops the charts in Ireland, and peaks at No. 2 in the UK.
- June 14 – Madonna starts her Who's That Girl Tour in Osaka, Japan.
- June 27 – Whitney Houston's second album Whitney becomes the first album by a female artist to debut at #1 on the Billboard 200.
- July 4
  - Kylie Minogue's recording career begins with the release of her cover version of the Little Eva hit The Loco-Motion; the single spends seven weeks at number one in her native Australia and leads to a contract with UK-based record producers Stock Aitken Waterman.
  - The first joint rock concert between the United States and the Soviet Union is held in Moscow to promote peace. The Doobie Brothers, James Taylor, Santana and Bonnie Raitt share the bill with Soviet rock group Autograph.
- August 1
  - Dave Stewart of Eurythmics and Siobhan Fahey of Bananarama are married in Normandy, France.
  - MTV Europe is launched. The first video played is "Money for Nothing" by Dire Straits.
- August 5 – The 1st Teens' Music Festival is held in Japan.
- August 19 – Rita Lee starts her Tour 87/88 in Vitória, Brazil.
- August 27 – The Jello Biafra criminal trial is dismissed after ending in a hung jury in Los Angeles court. Biafra and his manager had been charged with distributing harmful material to minors due to a poster included in the Dead Kennedys' Frankenchrist album of a painting depicting rows of sexual organs.
- August 31 – Michael Jackson releases Bad, his first studio album since Thriller, the best-selling album of all time. The album would produce five number one singles in the US, a record which has not been broken.

=== September–October ===
- September 6 – Madonna ends her Who's That Girl Tour in Florence, Italy.
- September 7 – Pink Floyd release A Momentary Lapse of Reason, their first album after the departure of, and legal battle with, bassist Roger Waters. The subsequent tour grossed around $135 million worldwide, a sum that was only equaled by the earnings of Michael Jackson and U2 combined.
- September 11 – Reggae musician Peter Tosh is murdered during a robbery in his home.
- September 15–October 4 – Johnny Hallyday performs at the Accor Arena for the first time.
- September 25 – CBS launches an American version of the long-running UK television show Top of the Pops. It lasts one year.
- October 4 – Electronic data gathering completely replaces the old sales diary technique in compiling the UK singles and albums chart. The publication day of new charts is moved from Tuesday to Sunday.
- October 8 – Chuck Berry receives a star on the Hollywood Walk of Fame.
- October 19 – Mötley Crüe release the song "You're All I Need" as a single. MTV refuse to play its video because of the level of violence.
- October 24 – The 16th OTI Festival, held at the Teatro São Luiz in Lisbon, Portugal, is won by the son "La felicidad está en un rincón de tu corazón", written by Luis Gerardo Tovar and Arnoldo Nali, and performed by Alfredo Alejandro representing Venezuela.
- October 31 – The Zorros headline on Halloween for the last-ever show at the Crystal Ballroom, Melbourne's premier Punk/New Wave venue. The Crystal Ballroom has seen almost ten years of intense musical evolution. The venue has chandeliers, stained glass windows, paisley wallpaper and a tiled foyer.

=== November–December ===
- November 13 – Sonny and Cher reunite for a performance on Late Night with David Letterman.
- November 18 – CBS Records is sold to the Sony Corporation in a deal worth about $2 billion; the company was renamed Sony Music Entertainment in 1991.
- November 19 – Cher returns to the music after five years of absence - time that she took to dedicate herself to the filmmaking business - with the lead single of her second self-titled album (and eighteenth overall), "I Found Someone", which peaked at number five in UK and number ten in US.
- November 24 – ABC airs Rolling Stone Magazine's 20 Years of Rock 'n' Roll television special, chronicling the music and the people of the past twenty years to commemorate the 20th anniversary of Rolling Stone magazine. The special includes new interviews as well as vintage performance footage of many rock legends such as Jimi Hendrix, The Doors, The Rolling Stones, David Bowie, Sex Pistols, Bruce Springsteen and many more.
- December 16 – John Mellencamp performs two free shows in the small town of Chillicothe, Ohio, after one-fifth of the population signs a petition asking him to play.
- December 23 – Roger Waters finalizes his departure from British progressive rock band Pink Floyd, after a two-year-long legal dispute over the rights to the band's name and assets.
- December 31 – The sixteenth annual New Year's Rockin' Eve special airs on ABC, with appearances by Lisa Lisa and Cult Jam, Los Lobos, Barry Manilow, Restless Heart and The Temptations.

=== Also in 1987 ===
- Naxos Records is established as a budget classical music CD label by Klaus Heymann, a German-born resident of Hong Kong.

== Bands formed ==
- See Musical groups established in 1987

== Bands disbanded ==
- See Musical groups disestablished in 1987

== Albums released ==
=== January–March ===
Date		Album	Artist	Notes
J A N U A R Y	1	Best of the West	Riders in the Sky	-
J A N U A R Y	1	I'm the Man	Anthrax	EP
J A N U A R Y	12	The House of Blue Light	Deep Purple	-
J A N U A R Y	19	Warehouse: Songs and Stories	Hüsker Dü	double album
J A N U A R Y	20	The Return of Bruno	Bruce Willis	Debut
J A N U A R Y	26	Control: The Remixes	Janet Jackson	Europe; Remix
J A N U A R Y	?	Famous Blue Raincoat	Jennifer Warnes	Canada
J A N U A R Y	?	The First Chapter	The Mission	Compilation
J A N U A R Y	?	Gaudi	The Alan Parsons Project	-
J A N U A R Y	?	I Hear You Rockin	Dave Edmunds	Live
J A N U A R Y	?	Up for a Bit with The Pastels	The Pastels	-
F E B R U A R Y	13	All in the Name of Love	Atlantic Starr	-
F E B R U A R Y	17	Fighting the World	Manowar	-
F E B R U A R Y	17	Lee Aaron	Lee Aaron	-
F E B R U A R Y	23	Jody Watley	Jody Watley	-
F E B R U A R Y	23	The World Won't Listen	The Smiths	Compilation
F E B R U A R Y	?	The Cost of Loving	The Style Council	UK
F E B R U A R Y	?	Freedom	Santana	-
F E B R U A R Y	?	Life as We Know It	REO Speedwagon	-
F E B R U A R Y	?	Mad, Bad and Dangerous to Know	Dead or Alive	-
F E B R U A R Y	?	Midnight to Midnight	The Psychedelic Furs	-
M A R C H	2	Boi-ngo	Oingo Boingo	-
M A R C H	2	Saint Julian	Julian Cope	-
M A R C H	2	Exposure	Exposé	-
M A R C H	2	Through the Looking Glass	Siouxsie and the Banshees	-
M A R C H	2	Trio	Linda Ronstadt, Emmylou Harris, Dolly Parton	-
M A R C H	3	Criminal Minded	Boogie Down Productions	-
M A R C H	9	The Joshua Tree	U2	
M A R C H	9	Wild Frontier	Gary Moore	-
M A R C H	14	Smooth Sailin'	The Isley Brothers	-
M A R C H	19	Rock the House	DJ Jazzy Jeff & The Fresh Prince	-
M A R C H	19	Tribute	Ozzy Osbourne and Randy Rhoads	Live 1981
M A R C H	22	Among the Living	Anthrax	-
M A R C H	23	Now That's What I Call Music 9 (UK series)	Various Artists	Compilation
M A R C H	30	The Circus	Erasure	UK
M A R C H	30	Into the Fire	Bryan Adams	-
M A R C H	30	Louder Than Bombs	The Smiths	US, compilation
M A R C H	31	Close to the Bone	Thompson Twins	-
M A R C H	31	Sign o' the Times	Prince	double album
M A R C H	?	Big Life	Night Ranger	-
M A R C H	?	Come as You Are	Peter Wolf	-
M A R C H	?	Locust Abortion Technician	Butthole Surfers	-
M A R C H	?	Men and Women	Simply Red	-
M A R C H	?	Running in the Family	Level 42	-
M A R C H	?	Taking Over	Overkill	-

=== April – June ===
Date		Album	Artist	Notes
A P R I L	1	Solitude Standing	Suzanne Vega	
A P R I L	2	Incognito	Céline Dion	
A P R I L	3	Babacar	France Gall	
A P R I L	4	Always & Forever	Randy Travis	-
A P R I L	6	Electric	The Cult	-
A P R I L	6	Meet Danny Wilson	Danny Wilson	-
A P R I L	7	Whitesnake	Whitesnake	US
A P R I L	13	F.L.M.	Mel and Kim	UK & Canada
A P R I L	13	Johnny Cash Is Coming to Town	Johnny Cash	-
A P R I L	13	Tango in the Night	Fleetwood Mac	-
A P R I L	15	Death Before Dishonour	The Exploited	-
A P R I L	21	The Legacy	Testament	-
A P R I L	21	Let Me Up (I've Had Enough)	Tom Petty & the Heartbreakers	-
A P R I L	23	Introduce Yourself	Faith No More	-
A P R I L	23	The Ultra-Violence	Death Angel	-
A P R I L	27	Never Let Me Down	David Bowie	-
A P R I L	27	You Boyz Make Big Noize	Slade	-
A P R I L	?	Coming Around Again	Carly Simon	-
A P R I L	?	One Voice	Barbra Streisand	Live
A P R I L	?	Out & Intake	Hawkwind	Compilation
A P R I L	?	Squirrel and G-Man Twenty Four Hour Party People; Plastic Face Carnt Smile (White Out)	Happy Mondays	-
A P R I L	?	Will Power	Joe Jackson	-
A P R I L	?	Yo! Bum Rush the Show	Public Enemy	-
A P R I L	?	The Young Gods	The Young Gods	-
M A Y	1	Raintown	Deacon Blue	debut
M A Y	4	Dawnrazor	Fields of the Nephilim	debut
M A Y	5	Kiss Me, Kiss Me, Kiss Me	The Cure	-
M A Y	11	It's Better to Travel	Swing Out Sister	-
M A Y	11	Live in the City of Light	Simple Minds	Live
M A Y	11	Under the Sign of the Black Mark	Bathory	-
M A Y	15	Girls, Girls, Girls	Mötley Crüe	-
M A Y	15	Jane's Addiction	Jane's Addiction	Live
M A Y	15	Richard Marx	Richard Marx	-
M A Y	18	Exit 0	Steve Earle	-
M A Y	20	Beverly Hills Cop II	Various Artists	Soundtrack
M A Y	20	Open Sesame	Whodini	-
M A Y	21	Strength of Steel	Anvil	
M A Y	22	Dana Dane with Fame	Dana Dane	-
M A Y	23	Keeper of the Seven Keys, Pt. 1	Helloween	-
M A Y	25	Scream Bloody Gore	Death	-
M A Y	29	Bring the Family	John Hiatt	-
M A Y	?	Chayanne	Chayanne	-
M A Y	?	Greatest Hits	Steve Harley and Cockney Rebel	Compilation
M A Y	?	Living in a Box	Living in a Box	-
J U N E	2	Whitney	Whitney Houston	-
J U N E	6	Bad Animals	Heart	-
J U N E	9	Join the Army	Suicidal Tendencies	-
J U N E	11	Bigger and Deffer	LL Cool J	-
J U N E	12	Clutching at Straws	Marillion	-
J U N E	15	Radio K.A.O.S.	Roger Waters	-
J U N E	21	Keel	Keel	-
J U N E	21	Pride	White Lion	-
J U N E	21	Priest...Live!	Judas Priest	Live
J U N E	21	Wild in the Streets	Helix	-
J U N E	23	Bangin'	The Outfield	-
J U N E	23	I Never Said Goodbye	Sammy Hagar	later re-titled I Never Said Goodbye
J U N E	25	Cleanse Fold and Manipulate	Skinny Puppy	-
J U N E	26	King's Record Shop	Rosanne Cash	
J U N E	29	Pop Goes the World	Men Without Hats	-
J U N E	30	La Bamba	Los Lobos et al.	Soundtrack
J U N E	?	1987 (What the Fuck Is Going On?)	The Justified Ancients of Mu Mu	recalled over copyright violation claim
J U N E	?	Let It Loose	Gloria Estefan and Miami Sound Machine	
J U N E	?	Pleased to Meet Me	The Replacements	-
J U N E	?	Sister	Sonic Youth	-
J U N E	?	Sold	Boy George	-
J U N E	?	Tallulah	The Go-Betweens	-

=== July – September ===
Date		Album	Artist	Notes
J U L Y	1	Scum	Napalm Death	-
J U L Y	6	Echo & the Bunnymen	Echo & the Bunnymen	-
J U L Y	6	In the Dark	The Grateful Dead	-
J U L Y	6	Life	Neil Young & Crazy Horse	-
J U L Y	6	Live in Australia with the Melbourne Symphony Orchestra	Elton John	Live
J U L Y	7	Buster Poindexter	Buster Poindexter	-
J U L Y	7	Faster Pussycat	Faster Pussycat	-
J U L Y	7	Frehley's Comet	Ace Frehley	-
J U L Y	7	Paid in Full	Eric B. & Rakim	-
J U L Y	7	Touch	Laura Branigan	-
J U L Y	13	Introducing the Hardline According to...	Terence Trent D'Arby	UK
J U L Y	15	Soy Como Quiero Ser	Luis Miguel	-
J U L Y	20	Born to Mack	Too Short	Debut
J U L Y	21	Appetite for Destruction	Guns N' Roses	Debut
J U L Y	21	Dream Evil	Dio	-
J U L Y	21	Who's That Girl	Madonna et al.	Soundtrack
J U L Y	27	In My Tribe	10,000 Maniacs	-
J U L Y	27	No Protection	Starship	-
J U L Y	27	Surveillance	Triumph	-
J U L Y	27	Within the Realm of a Dying Sun	Dead Can Dance	-
J U L Y	?	One Way Home	The Hooters	-
J U L Y	?	Once Bitten	Great White	-
J U L Y	?	Recently	Joan Baez	-
J U L Y	?	Sheila E.	Sheila E.	-
J U L Y	?	Strange Weather	Marianne Faithfull	-
A U G U S T	3	Hysteria	Def Leppard	-
A U G U S T	7	Hurricane Eyes	Loudness	Japan
A U G U S T	10	Between the Lines	Five Star	-
A U G U S T	13	Love Is for Suckers	Twisted Sister	-
A U G U S T	14	Crushin'	Fat Boys	-
A U G U S T	16	Deathcrush	Mayhem	EP
A U G U S T	17	Franks Wild Years	Tom Waits	-
A U G U S T	18	Out of the Blue	Debbie Gibson	-
A U G U S T	21	The $5.98 E.P.: Garage Days Re-Revisited	Metallica	Covers EP
A U G U S T	21	Dirty Dancing	Various Artists	Soundtrack
A U G U S T	24	The Lonesome Jubilee	John Mellencamp	-
A U G U S T	25	Door to Door	The Cars	-
A U G U S T	29	Sentimental Hygiene	Warren Zevon	-
A U G U S T	31	Bad	Michael Jackson	-
A U G U S T	31	Darklands	The Jesus and Mary Chain	-
A U G U S T	31	Move Somethin'	2 Live Crew	-
A U G U S T	31	Permanent Vacation	Aerosmith	-
A U G U S T	31	Wonderful Life	Black	-
A U G U S T	?	Diesel and Dust	Midnight Oil	-
A U G U S T	?	Hearsay	Alexander O'Neal	-
A U G U S T	?	Psonic Psunspot	The Dukes of Stratosphear	pseudonym of XTC
A U G U S T	?	Substance 1987	New Order	-
S E P T E M B E R	1	Document	R.E.M.	-
S E P T E M B E R	5	Contagious	Y&T	-
S E P T E M B E R	5	Raising Fear	Armored Saint	-
S E P T E M B E R	5	Rock 'n' Roll	Motörhead	-
S E P T E M B E R	5	Rock You to Hell	Grim Reaper	Final album
S E P T E M B E R		Triumph and Agony	Warlock (final album)	-
S E P T E M B E R	7	Actually	Pet Shop Boys	-
S E P T E M B E R	7	Islands	Mike Oldfield	-
S E P T E M B E R	7	The Last One to Know	Reba McEntire	-
S E P T E M B E R	7	A Momentary Lapse of Reason	Pink Floyd	UK
S E P T E M B E R	8	Go On...	Mr. Mister	-
S E P T E M B E R	8	Hold Your Fire	Rush	-
S E P T E M B E R	9	Earth, Sun, Moon	Love and Rockets	-
S E P T E M B E R	10	Songs About Fucking	Big Black	Final album
S E P T E M B E R	11	Crest of a Knave	Jethro Tull	-
S E P T E M B E R	11	Together Again	The Temptations	-
S E P T E M B E R	14	Always Guaranteed	Cliff Richard	-
S E P T E M B E R	14	Bridge of Spies	T'Pau	-
S E P T E M B E R	14	Happy?	Public Image Ltd	-
S E P T E M B E R	14	Primitive Cool	Mick Jagger	-
S E P T E M B E R	15	All Systems Go	Donna Summer	-
S E P T E M B E R	15	Halfway to Sanity	Ramones	-
S E P T E M B E R	15	Tiffany	Tiffany	-
S E P T E M B E R	16	Visual Lies	Lizzy Borden	-
S E P T E M B E R	17	Big Generator	Yes	-
S E P T E M B E R	17	London Symphony Orchestra, Vol. II	Frank Zappa	-
S E P T E M B E R	18	Crazy Nights	Kiss	-
S E P T E M B E R	21	Piledriver: The Wrestling Album 2	World Wrestling Federation	-
S E P T E M B E R	22	The Hunger	Michael Bolton	-
S E P T E M B E R	22	Man of Colours	Icehouse	Australia
S E P T E M B E R	24	Wendy and Lisa	Wendy & Lisa	-
S E P T E M B E R	24	The Right Night & Barry White	Barry White	-
S E P T E M B E R	28	Come On Pilgrim	Pixies	EP
S E P T E M B E R	28	Hall of the Mountain King	Savatage	-
S E P T E M B E R	28	Music for the Masses	Depeche Mode	-
S E P T E M B E R	28	Popped In Souled Out	Wet Wet Wet	UK
S E P T E M B E R	28	Raise Your Fist and Yell	Alice Cooper	-
S E P T E M B E R	28	Strangeways, Here We Come	The Smiths	-
S E P T E M B E R	29	The Uplift Mofo Party Plan	Red Hot Chili Peppers	-
S E P T E M B E R	?	Babylon and On	Squeeze	-
S E P T E M B E R	?	Vital Idol	Billy Idol	Remix
S E P T E M B E R	?	E.S.P.	Bee Gees	-
S E P T E M B E R	?	Honor Among Thieves	The Brandos	-
S E P T E M B E R	?	Just Us	Alabama	-
S E P T E M B E R	?	The People Who Grinned Themselves to Death	Housemartins	-
S E P T E M B E R	?	The Perfect Prescription	Spacemen 3	-
S E P T E M B E R	?	Poetic Champions Compose	Van Morrison	-
S E P T E M B E R	?	Wildside	Loverboy	-
S E P T E M B E R	?	Wow!	Bananarama	-

=== October - December ===
Date		Album	Artist	Notes
O C T O B E R	5	Heaven on Earth	Belinda Carlisle	-
O C T O B E R	5	The Lion and the Cobra	Sinéad O'Connor	-
O C T O B E R	7	Pleasures of the Flesh	Exodus	-
O C T O B E R	9	Tunnel of Love	Bruce Springsteen	-
O C T O B E R	12	Perfect Timing	McAuley Schenker Group	-
O C T O B E R	12	A Very Special Christmas	Various Artists	
O C T O B E R	13	Free as a Bird	Supertramp	-
O C T O B E R	13	...Nothing Like the Sun	Sting	-
O C T O B E R	15	Surfing with the Alien	Joe Satriani	
O C T O B E R	16	Masque	Manfred Mann's Earth Band	-
O C T O B E R	19	Kick	INXS	-
O C T O B E R	21	Abigail	King Diamond	-
O C T O B E R	26	Live at Wembley	Meat Loaf	UK; Live
O C T O B E R	26	Mainstream	Lloyd Cole and the Commotions	-
O C T O B E R	27	Robbie Robertson	Robbie Robertson	-
O C T O B E R	29	Got Any Gum?	Joe Walsh	-
O C T O B E R	30	Faith	George Michael	-
O C T O B E R	30	Schizophrenia	Sepultura	-
O C T O B E R	?	The Christians	The Christians	-
O C T O B E R	?	Hail! Hail! Rock 'n' Roll	Chuck Berry	Soundtrack
O C T O B E R	?	Outside Looking In	BoDeans	-
O C T O B E R	?	Red	The Communards	-
O C T O B E R	?	Unchain My Heart	Joe Cocker	-
O C T O B E R	?	Blues for Salvador	Carlos Santana	-
O C T O B E R	?	Touch the World	Earth, Wind & Fire	-
N O V E M B E R	2	All the Best!	Paul McCartney	Compilation
N O V E M B E R	2	Bête Noire	Bryan Ferry	-
N O V E M B E R	2	Cloud Nine	George Harrison	-
N O V E M B E R	2	Don't Let's Start	They Might Be Giants	EP
N O V E M B E R	3	How Ya Like Me Now	Kool Moe Dee	-
N O V E M B E R	4	Rhyme Pays	Ice-T	-
N O V E M B E R	6	Characters	Stevie Wonder	-
N O V E M B E R	6	N.W.A and the Posse	N.W.A	Compilation "debut"
N O V E M B E R	7	Calm Before the Storm	Venom	-
N O V E M B E R	7	Secrets of the Beehive	David Sylvian	-
N O V E M B E R	9	Nightfall	Candlemass	-
N O V E M B E R	9	Savage	Eurythmics	UK
N O V E M B E R	10	Cher	Cher	-
N O V E M B E R	13	Floodland	The Sisters of Mercy	-
N O V E M B E R	16	Less than Zero	Various Artists	Soundtrack
N O V E M B E R	16	Whenever You Need Somebody	Rick Astley	-
N O V E M B E R	17	You Can Dance	Madonna	Remix
N O V E M B E R	23	The Eternal Idol	Black Sabbath	-
N O V E M B E R	23	Jesus não Tem Dentes no País dos Banguelas	Titãs	
N O V E M B E R	23	Now That's What I Call Music 10 (UK series)	Various Artists	Compilation
N O V E M B E R	24	Canciones de Mi Padre	Linda Ronstadt	-
N O V E M B E R	24	Make It Last Forever	Keith Sweat	-
N O V E M B E R	27	Live...In the Raw	W.A.S.P.	Live
N O V E M B E R	27	Back for the attack	Dokken	-
N O V E M B E R	?	Calenture	The Triffids	-
N O V E M B E R	?	Love	Aztec Camera	-
N O V E M B E R	?	The Princess Bride	Mark Knopfler	Soundtrack
D E C E M B E R	1	Persecution Mania	Sodom	-
D E C E M B E R	8	Gitana	Daniela Romo	
D E C E M B E R	8	Inside Information	Foreigner	-
D E C E M B E R	14	You're Living All Over Me	Dinosaur Jr.	-
D E C E M B E R	?	The Initial Command	Front Line Assembly	-
D E C E M B E R	?	The Old Masters Box	Frank Zappa	Box Set
D E C E M B E R	?	One Lord, One Faith, One Baptism	Aretha Franklin	Live gospel album
D E C E M B E R	?	Sinitta!	Sinitta	UK

== Biggest hit singles ==
The following songs achieved the highest chart positions in the charts of 1987.

#	Artist	Title	Year	Country	Chart Entries
1	Whitney Houston	I Wanna Dance with Somebody Who Loves Me	1987	(United States)	UK 1 - May 1987 (16 weeks), US Billboard 1 - May 1987 (18 weeks), US Radio 1 of 1987 (peak 1 11 weeks), Holland 1 - May 1987 (13 weeks), Switzerland 1 - May 1987 (17 weeks), Norway 1 - May 1987 (11 weeks), Belgium 1 - May 1987 (13 weeks), Italy 1 for 1 week - Jun 1987, Germany 1 - May 1987 (5 months), ODK Germany 1 - May 1987 (21 weeks) (5 weeks at number 1) (12 weeks in top 10), Canada RPM 1 for 1 week - Jun 1987, New Zealand 1 for 4 weeks - Jun 1987, Australia 1 for 5 weeks - Jun 1987, Springbok 1 - Jun 1987 (24 weeks), Europe 1 for 8 weeks - Jun 1987, Germany 1 for 5 weeks - Jun 1987, US CashBox 2 of 1987, Sweden 2 - May 1987 (5 weeks), Canada 2 of 1987, US Platinum (certified by RIAA in Feb 1989), Austria 3 - Jun 1987 (5 months), Switzerland 3 of 1987, US BB 4 of 1987, Poland 4 - Jun 1987 (19 weeks), South Africa 4 of 1987, UK Gold (certified by BPI in Aug 1987), ARC 10 of 1987 (peak 1 14 weeks), France 10 - Jun 1987 (1 week), Italy 10 of 1987, Australia 11 of 1987, POP 22 of 1987, Brazil 38 of 1987, Germany 67 of the 1980s (peak 1 15 weeks), UK Songs 2013-23 peak 70 - Jan 2022 (5 weeks), nuTsie 83 of 1980s, UKMIX 627, UK most streamed for 1987
2	Rick Astley	Never Gonna Give You Up	1987	(United Kingdom)	UK 1 - Aug 1987 (24 weeks), US Billboard 1 - Dec 1987 (24 weeks), Holland 1 - Sep 1987 (13 weeks), France 1 - Aug 1987 (3 weeks), Norway 1 - Oct 1987 (10 weeks), Belgium 1 - Sep 1987 (12 weeks), Germany 1 - Sep 1987 (4 months), ODK Germany 1 - Sep 1987 (21 weeks) (3 weeks at number 1) (9 weeks in top 10), Canada RPM 1 for 3 weeks - Mar 1988, New Zealand 1 for 1 week - Feb 1988, Australia 1 for 7 weeks - Nov 1987, Springbok 1 - Oct 1987 (29 weeks), Germany 1 for 3 weeks - Oct 1987, South Africa 1 of 1988, Brit best song 1988, US CashBox 2 of 1988, Switzerland 2 - Sep 1987 (17 weeks), Canada 2 of 1988, US Radio 3 of 1988 (peak 1 10 weeks), Sweden 3 - Sep 1987 (6 weeks), US BB 4 of 1988, Austria 4 - Nov 1987 (5 months), US Gold (certified by RIAA in Feb 1989), UK Gold (certified by BPI in Sep 1987), Germany Gold (certified by BMieV in 1987), Australia 5 of 1988, ARC 11 of 1988 (peak 1 14 weeks), Italy 13 of 1987, Switzerland 20 of 1987, Brazil 31 of 1988, POP 61 of 1988, Germany 140 of the 1980s (peak 1 14 weeks), UKMIX 213, OzNet 765, Guardian Pop 72
3	Los Lobos	La Bamba	1987	(United States)	UK 1 - Jul 1987 (11 weeks), US Billboard 1 - Jun 1987 (21 weeks), Switzerland 1 - Aug 1987 (24 weeks), Italy 1 of 1987, Italy 1 for 10 weeks - Nov 1987, Eire 1 for 2 weeks - Jul 1987, Canada RPM 1 for 7 weeks - Aug 1987, Canada 1 of 1987, New Zealand 1 for 7 weeks - Aug 1987, Australia 1 for 7 weeks - Sep 1987, Springbok 1 - Sep 1987 (24 weeks), Holland 2 - Aug 1987 (11 weeks), Belgium 2 - Aug 1987 (10 weeks), Australia 2 of 1987, Grammy in 1987 (Nominated), Austria 4 - Oct 1987 (5 months), Switzerland 4 of 1987, Norway 4 - Aug 1987 (9 weeks), ODK Germany 7 - Aug 1987 (17 weeks) (5 weeks in top 10), ARC 8 of 1987 (peak 1 13 weeks), POP 8 of 1987, US Radio 9 of 1987 (peak 1 9 weeks), Germany 9 - Aug 1987 (3 months), US BB 11 of 1987, US CashBox 11 of 1987, Sweden 12 - Aug 1987 (1 week), Poland 17 - Sep 1987 (3 weeks), South Africa 17 of 1987, Brazil 27 of 1987, Scrobulate 75 of Latin, KROQ 81 of 1987, Holland free40 97 of 1987, France (InfoDisc) 102 of the 1980s (peak 1, 25 weeks, 934k sales estimated, 1987), Acclaimed 2050 (1987), RYM 116 of 1987, Party 227 of 1999
4	George Michael	Faith	1987	(United Kingdom)	US Billboard 1 - Oct 1987 (20 weeks), US BB 1 of 1988, Holland 1 - Oct 1987 (14 weeks), Belgium 1 - Oct 1987 (14 weeks), Italy 1 for 2 weeks - Nov 1987, Canada RPM 1 for 4 weeks - Dec 1987, New Zealand 1 for 4 weeks - Dec 1987, Australia 1 for 1 week - Jan 1988, Europe 1 for 4 weeks - Dec 1987, Top Song of 1988 of the Billboard 50th list, UK 2 - Oct 1987 (12 weeks), Norway 3 - Nov 1987 (10 weeks), Springbok 3 - Dec 1987 (19 weeks), Austria 4 - Dec 1987 (4 months), Switzerland 4 - Nov 1987 (13 weeks), US Gold (certified by RIAA in Nov 1989), ARC 5 of 1987 (peak 1 14 weeks), Sweden 5 - Oct 1987 (7 weeks), ODK Germany 5 - Nov 1987 (15 weeks) (5 weeks in top 10), US Radio 6 of 1987 (peak 1 10 weeks), Italy 7 of 1987, Germany 8 - Nov 1987 (2 months), POP 11 of 1987, Poland 13 - Dec 1987 (6 weeks), Australia 16 of 1988, Canada 33 of 1988, Brazil 38 of 1988, US Songs 2014-23 peak 47 - Jan 2017 (1 week), nuTsie 53 of 1980s, UK Songs 2013-23 peak 64 - Jan 2017 (2 weeks), Scrobulate 68 of fun, RIAA 322, OzNet 450, Acclaimed 529 (1987), RYM 126 of 1987
5	U2	With or Without You	1987	(Republic of Ireland)	US Billboard 1 - Mar 1987 (18 weeks), ARC 1 of 1987 (peak 1 13 weeks), Poland 1 - Mar 1987 (25 weeks), Eire 1 for 2 weeks - Mar 1987, Canada RPM 1 for 1 week - May 1987, Europe 1 for 2 weeks - May 1987, Holland 2 - Mar 1987 (12 weeks), MTV Video of the year 1987 (Nominated), UK 4 - Mar 1987 (24 weeks), Belgium 4 - Apr 1987 (9 weeks), Sweden 5 - Apr 1987 (7 weeks), Brazil 5 of 1987, Europe 5 of the 1980s (1987), US Radio 7 of 1987 (peak 1 10 weeks), Germany 7 - Apr 1987 (4 months), ODK Germany 7 - Apr 1987 (19 weeks) (7 weeks in top 10), KROQ 9 of 1987, Switzerland 10 - Apr 1987 (11 weeks), POP 10 of 1987, Springbok 11 - Jun 1987 (7 weeks), US CashBox 12 of 1987, Canada 14 of 1987, Poland 14 of all time, US BB 15 of 1987, Austria 15 - Jun 1987 (4 months), nuTsie 15 of 1980s, Belgium 24 of all time, Holland free40 35 of 1987, OzNet 44, TheQ 47, Vinyl Surrender 83 (1987), Scrobulate 93 of rock, WXPN 116, Rolling Stone 131, Acclaimed 309 (1987), RYM 6 of 1987, NY Daily Love list 68, Party 168 of 2007

== Top 40 Chart hit singles ==
Song title	Artist(s)	Release date(s)	US	UK	Highest chart position	Other Chart Performance(s)
"Alone"	Heart	May 1987	1	3	1 (Canada, United States)	See chart performance entry
"Always"	Atlantic Starr	May 1987	1	3	1 (Canada, United States)	1 (U.S. Billboard Adult Contemporary) - 1 (U.S. Billboard Hot R&B/Hip-Hop Songs) - 1 (U.S. Cash Box Top 100) - 2 (Canada Adult Contemporary) - 6 (South Africa) - 7 (New Zealand) - 66 (Australia)
"Always on My Mind"	Pet Shop Boys	November 1987	4	1	1 (8 countries)	See chart performance entry
"Animal"	Def Leppard	May 1987	19	6	3 (Ireland)	See chart performance entry
"Another Step (Closer to You)"	Kim Wilde & Junior	March 1987	n/a	6	6 (United Kingdom)	88 (Australia) - 95 (Netherlands [Single Top 100])
"Anyone Can Do the Heartbreak"	Anne Murray	September 1987	27	n/a	27 (United States)	4 (Canada Adult Contemporary)
"Are You Still in Love with Me"	Anne Murray	May 1987	n/a	n/a	n/a	8 (Canada Adult Contemporary) - 10 (Canada Country Tracks) - 20 (U.S. Hot Country Songs) - 33 (U.S. Billboard Adult Contemporary)
"At This Moment"	Billy Vera and the Beaters	January 1987	1	97	1 (Canada, United States)	See chart performance entry

=== Other Chart hit singles ===
- "¿A quién le importa?" – Alaska y Dinarama
- "Alone" - Heart
- "Angel" – Angela Winbush (U.S. Billboard Hot Black Singles)
- "Back in the High Life Again" (1986) – Steve Winwood
- "Bad" – Michael Jackson
- "Barcelona" – Freddie Mercury and Montserrat Caballé
- "Beds Are Burning" – Midnight Oil
- "Behind the Wheel" – Depeche Mode
- "Bella Vita" – David et Jonathan
- "Big Love" – Fleetwood Mac
- "Big Time" (1986) – Peter Gabriel
- "Boy Blue" (1986) – Cyndi Lauper
- "Breakout" (1986) – Swing Out Sister
- "Burning Like a Flame" – Dokken
- "Can't Stay Away From You" - Gloria Estefan & Miami Sound Machine
- "Can't We Try" – Dan Hill (duet with Vonda Shepard)
- "Can'tcha Say (You Believe in Me)" – Boston
- "Catch Me (I'm Falling)" – Pretty Poison
- "Causing a Commotion" – Madonna
- "C'est l'amour" – Léopold Nord & Vous
- "C'est la ouate" – Caroline Loeb
- "C'est la Vie" – Robbie Nevil
- "Change of Heart" (1986) – Cyndi Lauper
- "Cherry Bomb" – John Cougar Mellencamp
- "China in Your Hand" – T'Pau (UK)
- "Come Go with Me" – Exposé (released in 1986)
- "Control" – Janet Jackson (released in 1986)
- "Crazy Crazy Nights" – Kiss
- "Criticize" – Alexander O'Neal
- "Cross My Broken Heart" – The Jets
- "Debo Hacerlo" – Juan Gabriel
- "Diamonds" – Herb Alpert
- "Didn't We Almost Have It All" – Whitney Houston
- "Do It Properly" – Adonis
- "Doin'It All for My Baby" - Huey Lewis and the News
- "Don't Dream It's Over" – Crowded House
- "Don't Disturb This Groove" – The System
- "Don't Mean Nothing" – Richard Marx
- "Don't Shed a Tear" – Paul Carrack
- "Dude (Looks Like a Lady)" – Aerosmith
- "Dream Warriors" – Dokken
- "Electric Blue" – Icehouse
- "Electrica Salsa" – OFF
- "Ella elle l'a" – France Gall
- "Étienne" – Guesch Patti
- "Everlasting Love" – Sandra
- "Everybody Have Fun Tonight" (1986) – Wang Chung
- "Everywhere" – Fleetwood Mac
- "Fairytale of New York" – The Pogues with Kirsty MacColl (UK)
- "Faith" – George Michael
- "Fake" – Alexander O'Neal
- "Force Ten" – Rush
- "Funkytown" – Pseudo Echo (released in 1986)
- "The Game" – Echo & the Bunnymen
- "Got My Mind Set On You" George Harrison
- "Get Lucky" – Jermaine Stewart
- "Hazy Shade of Winter" – The Bangles
- "Head to Toe" – Lisa Lisa and Cult Jam
- "Heart and Soul" – T'Pau
- "Heartbreak Beat" – The Psychedelic Furs
- "Heat of the Night" – Bryan Adams
- "Heaven Is a Place on Earth" – Belinda Carlisle
- "Here I Go Again" – Whitesnake
- "Hey Matthew" – Karel Fialka (India)
- "Hold Me Now" – Johnny Logan
- "Hysteria" – Def Leppard
- "I Found Someone" – Cher
- "I Get Weak" (1986) – Belinda Carlisle
- "I Just Can't Stop Loving You" – Michael Jackson and Siedah Garrett
- "(I Just) Died in Your Arms" – Cutting Crew
- "I Knew You Were Waiting for Me" – Aretha Franklin and George Michael
- "I Know What I Like" - Huey Lewis and the News
- "I Need Love" – LL Cool J
- "I Still Haven't Found What I'm Looking For" – U2
- "I Think We're Alone Now" – Tiffany
- "I Wanna Dance with Somebody (Who Loves Me)" – Whitney Houston
- "I Want You So Bad" – Heart
- "I Want Your Sex" (1986) – George Michael
- "Im Nin'Alu" – Ofra Haza
- "In Too Deep (1986) – Genesis
- "The Irish Rover" – The Pogues & The Dubliners (Ireland)
- "Is This Love" – Whitesnake
- "It's Not Over 'Til It's Over" - Starship
- "It's the End of the World as We Know It (And I Feel Fine)" – R.E.M.
- "(I've Had) The Time of My Life" – Bill Medley & Jennifer Warnes
- "Jacob's Ladder" (1986) – Huey Lewis and the News
- "Je ne veux pas" – Céline Dion (Canada)
- "Joe le taxi" – Vanessa Paradis
- "Just Gets Better With Time" – The Whispers
- "Just to See Her" – Smokey Robinson
- "Kolé séré" – Jocelyne Béroard & Philippe Lavil
- "Kiss Him Goodbye" – The Nylons
- "Là-bas" – Jean-Jacques Goldman and Sirima
- "La Bamba" – Los Lobos
- "The Lady in Red" – Chris DeBurgh
- "Land Of Confusion" - Genesis
- "Lean on Me" – Club Nouveau
- "Let's Go!" (1986) – Wang Chung
- "Let Me Be the One" – Exposé
- "Let's Wait Awhile" – Janet Jackson
- "Lies" – Jonathan Butler
- "Lips Like Sugar" – Echo & the Bunnymen
- "Little Lies" – Fleetwood Mac
- "Livin' on a Prayer" – Bon Jovi (released in 1986)
- "Lo Mejor de Tu Vida" – Julio Iglesias
- "Looking for a New Love" – Jody Watley
- "Lost in Emotion" – Lisa Lisa and Cult Jam
- "Love Bites" – Def Leppard (charted in 1988)
- "Love Will Find a Way" – Yes
- "Love You Down" – Ready for the World
- "Luka" – Suzanne Vega
- "Mandolin Rain" (1986) – Bruce Hornsby and The Range
- "Midnight Blue" – Lou Gramm
- "Midnight Man" – Sandra
- "Mony Mony" – Billy Idol
- "Move Out" – Nancy Martinez
- "My Arms Keep Missing You" – Rick Astley
- "Need You Tonight" – INXS
- "Never Gonna Give You Up" – Rick Astley
- "Never Let Me Down Again" – Depeche Mode
- "Never Say Goodbye" (1986) – Bon Jovi
- "New Sensation" – INXS
- "Nothing's Gonna Change My Love for You" – Glenn Medeiros (USA release)
- "Nothing's Gonna Stop Us Now" – Starship
- "One Heartbeat" – Smokey Robinson
- "The One I love" – R.E.M.
- "Only in My Dreams" – Debbie Gibson
- "Open Your Heart" – Madonna (released in 1986)
- "Out of the Blue" – Debbie Gibson
- "Paper in Fire" – John Cougar Mellencamp
- "People Are Strange" – Echo & the Bunnymen
- "The Pleasure Principle" (1986) – Janet Jackson
- "Point of No Return" – Exposé
- "Pour Some Sugar on Me" – Def Leppard
- "The Power of Love" – Laura Branigan
- "Pump Up The Volume" – MARRS
- "Rag Doll" – Aerosmith
- "Rent" – Pet Shop Boys
- "Respect Yourself" – Bruce Willis
- "Rhythm Is Gonna Get You" – Gloria Estefan & Miami Sound Machine
- "Rhythm of Love" – Yes
- "Rock Steady" – The Whispers
- "Rocket" – Def Leppard
- "Rockin' Around the Christmas Tree" – Mel & Kim
- "Sans contrefaçon" – Mylène Farmer
- "Say It Again" – Jermaine Stewart
- "Say You Really Want Me" – Kim Wilde
- "Seven Wonders" - Fleetwood Mac
- "Shakedown" – Bob Seger
- "Should've Known Better" - Richard Marx
- "Sign o' the Times" – Prince
- "Skin Trade" - Duran Duran
- "So Emotional" – Whitney Houston
- "(Something Inside) So Strong" – Labi Siffre (UK)
- "Something So Strong" – Crowded House
- "Somewhere Out There" – Linda Ronstadt and James Ingram
- "Songbird" – Kenny G
- "Star Trekkin" – The Firm
- "Stone Love" – Kool & the Gang
- "Strangelove" – Depeche Mode
- "Strap Me In" - The Cars
- "Surrender" (1986) – Swing Out Sister
- "Sweet Child o' Mine" – Guns N' Roses (charted in 1988)
- "There's The Girl" – Heart
- "Throwing It All Away" – Genesis
- "Time Stand Still" – Rush
- "Tonight, Tonight, Tonight" – Genesis
- "Touch Me (I Want Your Body)" – Samantha Fox
- "Touch of Grey" – Grateful Dead
- "Tristana" – Mylène Farmer
- "Tunnel Of Love" - Bruce Springsteen
- "Twilight World" – Swing Out Sister
- "Twistin'The Night Away" - Rod Stewart
- "U Got the Look" – Prince and Sheena Easton
- "Une autre histoire" – Gérard Blanc
- "Valerie" (1982) – Steve Winwood
- "Wait" – White Lion
- "Walking Down Your Street" – The Bangles
- "Walking in the Air (Theme from 'The Snowman')" – The Shadows
- "Wanted Dead or Alive" (1986) – Bon Jovi
- "War" – Bruce Springsteen & the E Street Band
- "The Way It Is" – Bruce Hornsby and the Range
- "We Connect" – Stacey Q.
- "Welcome to the Jungle" – Guns N' Roses
- "What You Get Is What You See" – Tina Turner
- "What's Going On" – Cyndi Lauper
- "Whenever You Need Somebody" – Rick Astley
- "Where the Streets Have No Name" – U2
- "Who Will You Run To" - Heart
- "Who's That Girl" – Madonna
- "Why Can't I Be You?" – The Cure
- "With or Without You" – U2
- "Wonderful Life" – Black
- "Y Tú También Llorarás" – José Luis Rodríguez "El Puma"
- "Yaka dansé" – Raft
- "You Are The Girl" - The Cars
- "You Keep Me Hanging On" – Kim Wilde
- "You're the Voice" – John Farnham

== Notable singles ==
Song title	Artist(s)	Release date(s)	Other Chart Performance(s)
"Alex Chilton"	The Replacements	June 1987	n/a
"April Skies"	The Jesus and Mary Chain	July 1987	6 (Ireland) - 8 (UK Singles Chart) - 16 (New Zealand) - 44 (Europe)
"Beds Are Burning"	Midnight Oil	August 1987	See chart performance entry
"Behind the Wheel"	Depeche Mode	December 1987	See chart performance entry
"Birthday" (Icelandic)	The Sugarcubes	August 1987	n/a English version would chart the following year
"Bury Me Deep in Love"	The Triffids	October 1987	48 (Australia)
"Don't Let's Start"	They Might Be Giants	November 1987	94 (Australia)
"Fairytale of New York"	The Pogues featuring Kirsty MacColl	November 1987	1 (Ireland) - 2 (UK Singles Chart)
"Just Like Heaven"	The Cure	October 1987	See chart performance entry
"Last Night I Dreamt That Somebody Loved Me"	The Smiths	December 1987	2 (UK Indie Singles Chart) - 17 (New Zealand) - 30 (UK Singles Chart)
"Mandinka"	Sinéad O'Connor	December 1987	See chart performance entry
"My Island Home"	Warumpi Band	January 1987	67 (Australia)
"Never Let Me Down Again"	Depeche Mode	August 1987	See chart performance entry
"Paid in Full"	Eric B. & Rakim	October 1987	See chart performance entry
"The One I Love"	R.E.M.	August 1987	See chart performance entry
"True Faith"	New Order	July 1987	See chart performance entry
"What's My Scene?"	Hoodoo Gurus	March 1987	3 (Australia) - 35 (New Zealand)

=== Other Notable singles ===
- "Adultery" - Do-Re-Mi
- "Bye Bye Pride" - The Go-Betweens
- "Good Times" - Hoodoo Gurus
- "Little Fury Things" - Dinosaur Jr.
- "Pega rapaz" - Rita Lee & Roberto de Carvalho
- "The Prettiest Girl in the World" b/w "If That's What Love Is" - T.V. Personalities
- "Right Here" - The Go-Betweens
- "Shine On" - The House of Love
- "There's Too Many Irons in the Fire" - Cardiacs

== Published popular music ==
- "Last Midnight" w.m. Stephen Sondheim
- "Children Will Listen" w.m. Stephen Sondheim
- "Rhythm Is Gonna Get You" w.m. Gloria Estefan & E. E. Garcia
- "(I've Had) The Time of My Life" w.m. Franke Previte, Donald Markowitz & John DeNicola

== Classical music ==
- Pascal Bentoiu – Symphony No. 8 ("Imagini"), Op. 30
- John Cage – As Slow as Possible
- Mario Davidovsky – Quartet for flute, violin, viola and violoncello
- James Dillon - Helle Nacht, large orchestra (90 players)
- Joël-François Durand – Lichtung
- Petr Eben – Job, for organ
- Morton Feldman
  - Samuel Beckett, Words and Music, for 2 flutes, vibraphone, piano, violin, viola, and cello
  - For Samuel Beckett, for 23 instruments
  - Piano, Violin, Viola, Cello
- Brian Ferneyhough - Third String Quartet
- Lorenzo Ferrero
  - Ostinato
  - Non parto, non resto
- Malcolm Forsyth – Songs from the Qu'appelle Valley
- Karel Goeyvaerts – Aanloop en kreet (Run and Cry), for symphony orchestra and chorus
- Henryk Górecki - Totus Tuus, Op. 60
- Sofia Gubaidulina
  - String Quartet No. 2
  - String Quartet No. 3
- Toshio Hosokawa - Ferne Landschaft I
- György Kurtág
  - Kafka-Fragmente for soprano and violin
  - Requiem for a Friend to Poems by Rimma Dalos
- Helmut Lachenmann - Staub for orchestra
- Francisco Llácer Pla – Ricercare Concertante
- Philippe Manoury - Jupiter for flute and live electronics, op. 15a
- Nicholas Maw – Odyssey
- Conlon Nancarrow - String Quartet #3
- Luigi Nono
  - 1° Caminantes.....Ayacucho, for alto, flute, small and large chorus, organ, orchestra and live electronics
  - 2° No hay caminos, hay que caminar.....Andrej Tarkowskij, for seven ensembles
  - Post-prae-ludium No. 1 per Donau, for tuba and live electronics
  - Découvrir la subversion. Hommage à Edmond Jabès, for alto, narrator, flute, tuba, French horn and live electronics
- Per Nørgård - Violin Concerto No. 1 Helle Nacht
- Henri Pousseur – Traverser la forêt
- Wolfgang Rihm
  - Klangbeschreibung I
  - Klangbeschreibung II
  - Klangbeschreibung III
- Kaija Saariaho - Nymphéa, for string quartet and electronics
- Somei Satoh - Stabat Mater
- Ahmed Adnan Saygun – Cello Concerto
- Byambasuren Sharav – Symphony No. 2
- Juan Maria Solare – Doce variaciones 1987 (for piano)
- Toru Takemitsu
  - All in Twilight
  - I Hear the Water Dreaming
  - Signals from Heaven
- Joan Tower – Fanfare for the Uncommon Woman No. 1
- Galina Ustvolskaya - Symphony No. 4 - Prayer, for contralto, piano, trumpet and tam-tam
- Kevin Volans - String Quartet No. 2 Hunting: Gathering
- Iannis Xenakis
  - Ata, for orchestra
  - À r. (Hommage à Ravel), for piano
  - Jalons, for piccolo, oboe, bass clarinet, doublebass clarinet, contrabassoon, horn, trumpet, trombone, tuba, harp, string quintet
  - Kassandra, for baritone/psalterion and percussion
  - XAS, for saxophone quartet
  - Taurhiphanie, 2-track
  - Tracées, for orchestra

== Opera ==
- John Adams – Nixon in China
- Friedrich Cerha – Der Rattenfänger (The Pied Piper)
- Michael Nyman – Vital Statistics
- Judith Weir – A Night at the Chinese Opera, 8 July, Everyman Theatre, Cheltenham, England

== Musical theater ==
- Abyssinia, with music by Ted Kociolek and lyrics by James Racheff – Off-Broadway production at the CSC Repertory Theater
- Up on the Roof by Simon Moore and Jane Prowse—Portsmouth, UK production
- Roza, with music by Gilbert Bécaud and lyrics and book by Julian More based on Romain Gary's novel La vie devant soi – Broadway production opened at the Royale Theatre and closed after only 10 days.
- Anything Goes – Broadway revival
- Bless the Bride – West End revival
- Cabaret (Kander and Ebb) – Broadway revival
- Dreamgirls – Broadway revival
- Into the Woods – Broadway production opened at the Martin Beck Theatre and ran for 765 performances.
- Les Misérables – Broadway production opened at The Broadway Theatre and ran for a total of 6680 performances, the second-longest run of any Broadway musical after Cats
- Oil City Symphony – off-Broadway production ran for 626 performances
- Starlight Express (Andrew Lloyd Webber and Richard Stilgoe) – Broadway production opened at the Gershwin Theatre and ran for 761 performances

== Musical films ==
- Aria
- Dirty Dancing
- Hail! Hail! Rock 'n' Roll
- Hearts of Fire
- La Bamba
- Mr. India
- Rock 'n' Roll Nightmare
- Sign o' the Times
- Testimony

== Births ==
- January 2 – Syesha Mercado, American singer and actress
- January 7 – Sirusho, Armenian singer
- January 9 – Paolo Nutini, British singer
- January 12
  - Naya Rivera, American actress and singer (d. 2020)
  - Sunday (Jin Bo-ra), Korean pop singer (TSZX The Grace)
- January 16 – Jake Epstein, Canadian actor and singer
- January 18 – Stefan Filipović, Montenegrin pop singer
- January 19 – Rahma Riad, Iraqi singer
- January 22 – Angel Olsen, American folk and indie rock singer
- January 27
  - Katy Rose, American singer-songwriter, producer, musician and actress
  - Ashley Grace, American singer-songwriter (Ha*Ash)
- January 31 – Marcus Mumford, British singer-songwriter, musician and producer
- February 1 – Heather Morris, American actress, dancer, singer and model
- February 2
  - Heather Bright, American pop singer-songwriter, DJ and record producer
  - Victoria Song, Chinese pop singer (f(x))
- February 3 – Elvana Gjata, Albanian singer
- February 5 – Darren Criss, American actor and singer-songwriter
- February 6 – DJ Raiden, Korean DJ and producer
- February 7
  - Kerli, Estonian singer-songwriter
  - Monika Brodka, Polish singer
- February 10
  - Choi Si Won, Korean actor and pop singer
  - Poli Genova, Bulgarian singer and TV presenter
- February 12
  - O'Ryan (Browner), American R&B singer
  - Titanic Sinclair, American director, producer, singer-songwriter and internet personality
- February 17 – Lee Bo-ram, K-pop singer (SeeYa)
- February 23 – Ab-Soul, American rapper (Black Hippy)
- February 24 – Kim Kyu-jong, Korean pop singer (SS501)
- February 25 – Eva Avila, Canadian singer-songwriter
- February 27 – Cory Henry, American jazz organist, pianist, gospel musician, and producer (Snarky Puppy)
- March 1 – Kesha, American singer-songwriter, author, activist, musician
- March 2 – Ken Hung, Hong Kong singer and actor
- March 4 – Aja Volkman, American singer-songwriter and musician.
- March 8 - Tobe Nwigwe, American rapper, singer and actor
- March 9 – Bow Wow, American hip-hop artist, actor
- March 10
  - Emeli Sandé, Scottish singer-songwriter
  - Mod Sun, American singer-songwriter, multi-instrumentalist and rapper (Four Letter Lie and Scary Kids Scaring Kids; working with Avril Lavigne (dated), Travis Barker, Bella Thorn, Tana Mongeau, Dove Cameron, Megan Fox and Becky G, blackbear)
- March 12 – Hiroomi Tosaka, Japanese singer
- March 20 – Jonas Rivanno, Indonesian actor, model and singer
- March 25 – Jason Castro, American singer
- March 26 – YUI, Japanese pop singer
- March 27 – Polina Gagarina, Russian singer-songwriter, actress and model
- March 31 – Jeff Montalvo (Seven Lions), American electronic music producer
- April 3 –
  - Park Jung-min, Korean pop singer (SS501)
  - Rachel Bloom, American actress, comedian, singer, writer, producer, songwriter and mental health activist
- April 9
  - Jesse McCartney, American singer-songwriter, musician, voice actor and actor
  - Jazmine Sullivan, American singer
- April 10 – Hayley Westenra, New Zealand soprano singer
- April 11
  - Lights, Canadian singer-songwriter
  - Joss Stone, English soul singer-songwriter
- April 12 – Brendon Urie, American vocalist and musician
- April 15 – Iyaz, British Virgin Islands singer
- April 17 – Jacqueline MacInnes Wood, Canadian actress, disc jockey, singer and television host
- April 18 – Samantha Jade, Australian singer and actress
- April 20 − Anna Rossinelli, Swiss singer-songwriter
- April 21 − Anastasia Prikhodko, Ukrainian folk rock and traditional pop singer
- April 24
  - Jessica Pratt, American singer-songwriter
  - Sharon Doorson, Dutch singer-songwriter (Twenty 4 Seven)
- April 30 – Nikki Webster, Australian pop singer/businesswoman/actress
- May 2 – Nana Kitade, Japanese singer
- May 4 – Anjeza Shahini, Albanian singer
- May 6
  - Moon Geun-young, South Korean actress
  - Meek Mill, American rapper
- May 7 – Asami Konno, Japanese singer
- May 13
  - Hunter Parrish, American actor and singer
  - Candice King, American actress and singer
  - Charlotte Wessels, Dutch singer-songwriter (Delain, Phantasma, Kamelot)
- May 15
  - Ammo, American record producer and songwriter
  - Jennylyn Mercado, Filipina actress, singer, television personality
- May 16 – Can Bonomo, Turkish-Jewish singer
- May 17 – DJ Akademiks, Jamaican-American blogger who covers hip-hop
- May 18 – Luisana Lopilato, Argentine actress, singer and model (Michael Buble)
- May 21 – Hit-Boy, American record producer, rapper and singer-songwriter
- May 24 – Jimena Barón, Argentine actress and singer
- May 29 – Ak'Sent, American rapper
- May 30 – Joyce Cheng, Hong Kong singer and actress
- June 2 – Matthew Koma, American songwriter-singer, DJ and record producer (married to Hilary Duff)
- June 8 – Ty Segall, American multi-instrumentalist, singer-songwriter and record producer
- June 10 – Dotter, Swedish singer-songwriter
- June 12 – Ryu Deok-hwan, South Korean actor
- June 16
  - Diana DeGarmo, singer, American Idol contestant
  - Ali Stroker, American musician, singer, actress and advocate
- June 17 – Kendrick Lamar, American rapper and songwriter (Black Hippy)
- June 17 – Nozomi Tsuji, Japanese singer (Morning Musume)
- June 19 – Miho Fukuhara, Japanese singer and actress (Sweetbox)
- June 21
  - Khatia Buniatishvili, Georgian pianist
  - Kim Ryeowook, Korean pop singer (Super Junior)
- June 22 – Oh Yeon-seo, South Korean singer and actress (Luv)
- June 23
  - Jacob Lusk, American singer
  - Caitlin Rose, American country singer
- June 27 – Tomoya Kanki, Japanese musician (One Ok Rock)
- July 1 – Yoga Lin, Taiwanese pop singer, One Million Star, Season 1 winner
- July 4 – Jah Prayzah, Zimbabwean musician
- July 6 – Kate Nash, English pop singer-songwriter and musician
- July 9 – Rebecca Sugar, American animator, director, screenwriter, producer and songwriter
- July 10 - Buck Meek, American Musician and member of Big Thief, (works with and was married to Adrianne Lenker)
- July 11 – Shigeaki Kato, Japanese singer and actor (NEWS and K.K.Kity)
- July 13 – Eva Rivas, Russian-Armenian singer
- July 14
  - Drew Fortier, American musician, songwriter, filmmaker and actor
  - Dan Reynolds, American singer-songwriter, activist (Imagine Dragons and Egyptian)
  - Peter Vives, Spanish actor, singer and classical pianist
- July 17
  - Chloe Lowery, American singer-songwriter
  - Jeremih, American recording artist and producer
- July 19 – Nicola Benedetti, Scottish violinist
- July 23 – Felipe Dylon, Brazilian singer
- July 25
  - Alan Dawa Dolma (better known as "Alan"), Chinese singer
  - Jax Jones, English singer, producer and DJ
  - Gor Sujyan, Armenian rock singer, lead singer of Dorians
  - Mitchell Burgzorg, Dutch footballer and rapper
- July 26 – Evelina Sašenko-Statulevičienė, Lithuanian jazz singer of Polish-Ukrainian descent
- July 28
  - Sevak Khanagyan, Russian-Armenian singer
  - John Stevens, American singer
- July 29 - Illangelo, Canadian record producer, songwriter, musician and mixing engineer (The Weeknd, Grimes)
- July 30 – Elise Estrada, Canadian singer
- August 2
  - Nayer, American pop singer
  - Jessie Daniels, American actress, songwriter and musician
- August 3 – Kim Hyung-jun, South Korean singer and DJ
- August 6 – Aditya Narayan, Bollywood actor and singer
- August 6 – Sezairi Sezali, Singaporean musician and singer-songwriter
- August 9 – Noonie Boa, Swedish singer-songwriter and record producer
- August 19
  - John Ryan, also known as John the Blind and JRY, American singer-songwriter, record producer and multi-instrumentalist (Niall Horan, Sabrina Carpenter, One Direction, De;ta Goodrem)
  - Anaïs Lameche, Swedish singer (Play)
- August 21 – Kim Kibum, Korean actor and pop singer
- August 24 – Daichi Miura, Japanese singer-songwriter, dancer and choreographer
- August 26 – Gin Lee, Malaysian singer based in Hong Kong
- September 1
  - Dann Hume, New Zealand musician, music producer, mix engineer and songwriter (Amy Shark)
  - Sevdaliza, Irish Dutch singer-songwriter and record producer
- September 2
  - Audrey Tait, Scottish drummer (Franz Ferdinand, Hector Bizerk)
  - Spencer Smith, American musician, songwriter and talent agent (Panic! at the Disco)
- September 6 – Ramiele Malubay, Filipino-American singer
- September 7 – Evan Rachel Wood, American singer and actress
- September 8 – Wiz Khalifa, American rapper and singer
- September 9 – Afrojack, Dutch DJ, record producer and remixer
- September 13 – Snoh Aalegra, Swedish singer based in Los Angeles
- September 16 – Sarah Hay, American ballerina and actress
- September 18 – Luísa Sobral, Portuguese singer and songwriter
- September 19 – Sam Ellis, Canadian singwriter and record producer
- September 21 – Elly, Japanese dancer, rapper, choreographer (Sandaime J Soul Brothers)
- September 22 – Tom Felton, English actor and musician
- September 23 – Skylar Astin, American actor and singer
- September 26 – Rosie Munter, Swedish vocalist and dancer
- September 28
  - Hilary Duff, American singer-songwriter, author and actress (married to Matthew Koma, sister of Haylie Duff, Sutton Foster)
  - Chloë Hanslip, English violinist
- September 29 – Gryffin, American musician, DJ, record producer.
- September 30 – Aida Garifullina, Russian soprano
- October 3
  - Starley, Australian singer-songwriter
  - Kaci Battaglia, American singer, songwriter and dancer
  - Zuleyka Rivera, Puerto Rivan actress, television host, dancer, model and beauty queen
- October 7 – Lauren Mayberry, Scottish singer-songwriter, writer and journalist (Chvrches)
- October 17 – Stephanie (Kim Bo-kyung), American-born Korean pop singer (TSZX The Grace)
- October 18 – Zac Efron, American actor, dancer, singer, musical star
- October 23 – Faye, Swedish singer, songwriter and model (Play)
- October 28 – Frank Ocean, American singer-songwriter
- October 29 – Tove Lo, Swedish singer-songwriter, dancer and activist
- October 29 – Makoto Ogawa, Japanese singer and actress (Morning Musume)
- November 3 – Courtney Barnett, Australian singer-songwriter/musician
- November 4
  - Tim Douwsma, Dutch singer
  - T.O.P, Korean rapper
- November 5 – Kevin Jonas, American musician (Jonas Brothers)
- November 9 – Zahara, South African Afro-soul singer-songwriter (d. 2023)
- November 10 – Charles Hamilton, American rapper and producer
- November 12 – Jamison Ross, American drummer and vocalist
- November 20 – Siouxsie Medley, American musician (Dead Sara)
- November 24 – Sermstyle, English singer-songwriter, remixer, record producer and DJ
- November 25 – Dolla, American rapper
- November 26 – Kat DeLuna, American singer-songwriter and dancer
- November 29 – Cashmere Cat, Norwegian DJ, record producer, musician and turntablist (Ariana Grande)
- November 30 – Dougie Poynter, English pop-rock bass guitarist (McFly)
- December 1 – Vance Joy, Australian musician
- December 2 – Teairra Mari, American R&B singer-songwriter, dancer, model and actress
- December 7 – Aaron Carter, American pop singer and rapper (d. 2022)
- December 14 - Alex Gaskarth, English-born American singers-songwriter
- December 15 - Lady Leshurr, British hip-hop grime dancehall rapper, singer-songwriter and producer
- December 18 – Ayaka, Japanese pop singer
- December 20 – Barrie-James O'Neill, Scottish singer-songwriter, working with Lana Del Rey
- December 22 – Lisa Andreas, English-Cypriot singer
- December 25 – Julian Lage, American guitarist and composer
- December 27 – Yui Okada, Japanese pop singer
- Unknown: Fabiana Palladino, English singer-songwriter and musician

== Deaths ==
- January 6 – Jaidev, Bollywood composer, 67
- January 10 – Marion Hutton, singer and actress, 67
- January 15 – Ray Bolger, Wizard of Oz actor, 83 (cancer)
- January 30 – Harold Loeffelmacher, musician and bandleader (Six Fat Dutchmen), 81
- February 2
  - Spike Hughes, jazz double bass player, composer and journalist, 78
  - Alfred Lion, record executive and co-founder of Blue Note Records, 78
- February 4 – Liberace, US pianist, 67 (AIDS-related)
- February 8 – Tony Destra, glam metal drummer, 32 (car accident)
- February 18 – Dmitri Kabalevsky, composer
- February 23 – Zeca Afonso, folk musician, 57
- March 3 – Danny Kaye, actor, singer, dancer and comedian, 76
- March 6 – Eddie Durham, jazz musician, 80
- March 7 – Evelyn Dove, singer, 85
- March 15 – Don Gant, singer/songwriter, record producer, 44 (complications following boating accident)
- March 18 – Elizabeth Poston, composer, 82
- March 20 – Rita Streich, coloratura soprano, 66
- March 21
  - Dean Paul Martin, singer and actor, 35 (plane crash)
  - Robert Preston, actor and singer, 68
- March 28 – Maria von Trapp, subject of The Sound of Music, 82
- March 29 – Felix Prohaska, conductor
- April 2 – Buddy Rich, American jazz drummer, 69 (brain tumor)
- April 7 – Carlton Barrett, Jamaican reggae drummer (The Wailers), 36 (murdered)
- April 8 – Anni Frind, German lyric soprano, 87
- April 14 – Karl Höller, German composer, 79
- May 2 – Larry Clinton, US bandleader and songwriter, 75
- May 3 – Dalida, singer, actress and Miss Egypt 1954, 54 (suicide)
- May 4 – Paul Butterfield, blues vocalist and harmonica player, 44 (drug overdose)
- May 5 – Allen Jones, record producer (heart attack)
- May 13
  - Signe Amundsen, operatic soprano, 87
  - Ismael Rivera, salsa composer and singer, 55 (heart attack)
- May 14 – Rita Hayworth, dancer and film star, 68
- May 24 – Hermione Gingold, actress and singer
- May 26 – Robert Wilkins, blues guitarist and singer, 91
- May 29 – Phyllis Tate, avant-garde composer, 76
- June 3 – Andrés Segovia, guitar virtuoso, 94
- June 18 – Kid Thomas Valentine, jazz trumpeter & bandleader, 91
- June 21 – Abram Chasins, pianist and composer, 84
- June 22
  - Fred Astaire, dancer, actor and singer, 88
  - Frank Rehak, jazz trombonist
- June 25 – Boudleaux Bryant, Hall of Fame songwriter, 67
- June 26
  - Henk Badings, composer, 80
  - Gábor Rejtő, cellist, 70
- July 1 – Snakefinger, guitarist, 38 (heart attack)
- July 7
  - Tibor Frešo, composer, 69
  - Germaine Thyssens-Valentin, pianist, 85
- July 10 – John Hammond, producer and musician, 76
- July 15 – Pete King, drummer (After The Fire, BAP), 28 (testicular cancer)
- July 25 – Alex Sadkin, saxophonist and record producer, 37 or 38 (motor accident)
- July 26 – Joe Liggins, R&B, jazz and blues pianist, 72
- July 30 – Ramón González Barrón, composer and choral conductor, 89
- August 2 – David Martin, bassist (Sam the Sham), 50 (heart attack)
- August 12 – Sally Long, Ziegfeld Follies star, 85
- August 14 – Vincent Persichetti, composer, 72
- August 27
  - Bruce Holder, violinist, conductor and composer, 82
  - Scott La Rock, hip-hop DJ and producer, 25 (shot)
- September 3 – Morton Feldman, composer, 51 (pancreatic cancer)
- September 11 – Peter Tosh, reggae musician, 42 (shot and killed in a house invasion/robbery)
- September 21 – Jaco Pastorius, jazz bassist, 35 (brain damage resulting from fight)
- September 23 – Bob Fosse, dancer, choreographer and director of musicals, 60 (heart attack)
- September 29 – Sebastian Peschko, pianist, 77
- October 3 – Hans Gál, composer, 97
- October 13 – Kishore Kumar, singer, actor, filmmaker, writer, musician and composer, 58
- October 14 – Rodolfo Halffter, composer, 86
- October 19 – Jacqueline du Pré, English cellist, 42 (multiple sclerosis)
- October 28 – Woody Herman, US jazz clarinetist and bandleader, 74
- November 12 – Cornelis Vreeswijk, Swedish singer-songwriter, 50 (liver cancer)
- November 16 – Zubir Said, composer, 80
- November 22 – Verna Arvey, librettist and pianist
- November 23 – Joseph Beer, composer, 79
- December 5 – Pappy Daily, country music entrepreneur and record producer, 85
- December 8 – Annelies Kupper, operatic soprano, 81
- December 10 – Jascha Heifetz, violinist
- December 12 – Clifton Chenier, zydeco singer and accordionist, 62
- December 18 – Conny Plank, record producer, 47
- December 21 – John Spence, ska musician, 18 (suicide)
- December 22 – Luca Prodan, rock musician, 34 (cirrhosis of the liver)
- Unknown – Emani Sankara Sastry, veena player and composer, 65

== Awards ==
- The following artists are inducted into the Rock and Roll Hall of Fame: The Coasters, Eddie Cochran, Bo Diddley, Aretha Franklin, Marvin Gaye, Bill Haley, B. B. King, Clyde McPhatter, Ricky Nelson, Roy Orbison, Carl Perkins, Smokey Robinson, Big Joe Turner, Muddy Waters, and Jackie Wilson

=== Grammy Awards ===
- Grammy Awards of 1987

=== Country Music Association Awards ===
- 1987 Country Music Association Awards

=== Eurovision Song Contest ===
- Eurovision Song Contest 1987

=== Glenn Gould Prize ===
- R. Murray Schafer (laureate)

== Charts ==
- List of Billboard Hot 100 number ones of 1987
- 1987 in British music#Charts
- List of Oricon number-one singles of 1987

== See also ==
- Record labels established in 1987
