= Est-ce que tu viens pour les vacances? =

1988 single by David & Jonathan

Single by David et Jonathan

from the album Cœur de gosse
- B-side: "On ira"
- Released: May 1988
- Recorded: 1987 or 1988
- Studio: Studio CBE (recording)
- Genre: Pop
- Length: 4:15
- Label: Sefra
- Composer: David Marouani
- Lyricists: Didier Barbelivien, Pascal Auriat
- Producer: Pascal Auriat

David et Jonathan singles chronology
"Gina" (1987)	"Est-ce que tu viens pour les vacances?" (1988)	"Cœur de gosse" (1988)

"Est-ce que tu viens pour les vacances?" (English: “Are you coming for the holidays?") is a 1988 pop song recorded by French vocal duet David et Jonathan. Written by Didier Barbelivien and Pascal Auriat with music composed by duet member David Marouani, it was the third single from their 1988 album Cœur de gosse, (English: "Kid's heart") on which it appears as the first track, and was released in May 1988. It achieved success in France, peaking at number three and thus becoming one of the summer hits of 1988.

== Lyrics and music video ==
Lyrics were written by Didier Barbelivien, who had written the duet's previous single, "Gina". The phrase "a crocodile on your blouson" is sometimes viewed as an indirect reference to the trademark of Lacoste. The music video for "Est-ce que tu viens pour les vacances ?" was shot on a beach in Hammamet, Tunisia, and shows images of the duet playing piano and experiencing a summertime love with girls on a sunny beach, which is often considered as dated; however, duet member Jonathan Bermudes considered that it was perfectly in the style of the 1980s and that it remained in the memory of a whole generation. In 2013, Marouani said the song generates royalties which provide an amount of 5000 euros per year.

== Cover versions ==
"Est-ce que tu viens pour les vacances ?" attracted attention after being parodied by Les Nuls under the title "Qu'est-ce que tu vends pour les vacances ?", with Alain Chabat et Dominique Farrugia in the roles of David and Jonathan.

== Chart performance ==
In France, "Est-ce que tu viens pour les vacances ?" debuted at number 44 on the chart edition of 25 June 1988, entered the top ten in its fifth week where it remained for ten weeks; it reached number three for non consecutive five weeks, being unable to dislodge at the first two positions "Nuit de folie" by Début de Soirée and "Un roman d'amitié (Friend You Give Me a Reason)" by Elsa Lunghini and Glenn Medeiros; then it fell off the top 50 straight from number 27 after 20 weeks of presence. It earned a Gold disc, awarded by the Syndicat National de l'Édition Phonographique. On the European Hot 100 Singles, it started at number 85 on 16 July 1988 and reached a peak of number nine in its seventh week, and remained on the chart for a total of 19 weeks, nine of them in the top 20.

== Track listings ==
- 7" single
1. "Est-ce que tu viens pour les vacances ?" — 4:15
2. "On ira" — 3:47
- 12" maxi
1. "Est-ce que tu viens pour les vacances ?" — 6:49
2. "On ira" — 3:47
- 7" single - Canada
1. "Est-ce que tu viens pour les vacances ?" — 4:25
2. "Où va l'amour ami ?" — 3:58

== Personnel ==
- Arrangement — Bernard Estardy
- Cover design — Claude Caudron
- Photography — F. Darmigny
- Producer — Pascal Auriat

== Charts and certifications ==
=== Weekly charts ===
Chart (1988)	Peak position
Europe (European Hot 100)	9
France (SNEP)	3

=== Year-end charts ===
Chart (1988)	Position
Europe (European Hot 100)	53

=== Certifications ===
Certifications for "Est-ce que tu viens pour les vacances ?"
Region	Certification	Certified units/sales
France (SNEP)	Gold	500,000^{*}
^{*} Sales figures based on certification alone.

== Release history ==
Country	Date	Format	Label
France	1988	7" single	Sefra
France	1988	12" single	Sefra
Canada	1988	7" single	Charles Talar
