= Blue Feather (band) =

Dutch funk band

- Origin: Netherlands
- Genres: Pop, soul, funk
- Years active: 1980s
- Label: Mercury
- Past members: Erik Meijer (drums); Ronald Brouwer; Edwin Brouwer; Jan Willem Weeda; Lex Nusink; Rob Hoelen; Dirk Nusink

Blue Feather was a Dutch male vocal/instrumental group active during the 1980s. In 1981, they released the single "Let's Funk Tonight" on the Mercury label. It peaked at number 50 on the UK Singles Chart in July 1982, spending four weeks on the charts. The track was later included on the 2008 compilation album Return to the Playboy Mansion by Dimitri from Paris.

The group released two albums: Feather Funk in 1982, and Shadows of the Night in 1985. Their other singles include "Call Me Up" (1981), "It's Love" (1981), "Let It Out" (1983) and "After Midnight" (1986).
