= Mutin =

Mutin may refer to:

- Thierry Mutin, French singer and songwriter
- French ship Mutin, a list of French ships bearing the name
