= La Vie la nuit =

1988 single by Début de Soirée

Single by Début de Soirée

from the album Jardins d'enfants
- B-side: "Week-end Dance"
- Released: December 1988
- Recorded: 1988, France
- Genre: Euro disco, synth-pop
- Length: 3:51
- Label: CBS
- Composers: Claude Mainguy, Guy Mattéoni
- Lyricist: William Picard
- Producer: Bel Air Studio

Début de Soirée singles chronology
"Nuit de folie" (1988)	"La Vie la nuit" (1988)	"Jardins d'enfants" (1989)

"La Vie la nuit" is a 1988 song recorded by French pop duet Début de Soirée. Written by William Picard with a music composed by Claude Mainguy and Guy Mattéoni, it was their second single from their album Jardins d'enfants and was released in December 1988. In France, it became a hit, remaining at number two for almost two months.

== Music ==
The music for "La Vie la nuit" is typical of the 1980s synth-pop era. Before the last refrain, the song used a sample from the introduction of "Nuit de folie", the duet previous single.

== Critical reception ==
A review in Pan-European magazine Music & Media presented "La Vie la nuit" as an "uncomplicated, unpretentious, carefree pop in a cheerful, disco setting. Aimed straight at the heart of the charts".

== Chart performance ==
In France, "La Vie la nuit" entered the singles chart at number 11 on the chart edition of 24 December 1988, reached the top ten two weeks later, peaked at number two for non consecutive six weeks, being blocked from the number one slot first by David Hallyday's "High", then the charity single "Pour toi Arménie". It stayed for a total of 14 weeks in the top ten and 21 weeks in the top 50, and was certified Gold disc by the Syndicat National de l'Édition Phonographique. In Belgium (Wallonia), it peaked at number three, and was a top 40 hit in Flanders where it charted for six weeks. On the European Hot 100 Singles, it debuted at number 43 on 14 January 1989, reached a peak of number nine twice, in its fourth and eighth weeks, and fell off the chart after 19 weeks of presence, 11 of them in the top 20.

== Track listings ==
- 7" single - France, the Netherlands, Canada
1. "La Vie la nuit" — 3:51
2. "Week-end Dance" — 3:38
- CD maxi - France, Austria
1. "La Vie la nuit" (Pete Hammond remix) — 3:53
2. "La Vie la nuit" (extended remix) — 7:32
3. "La Vie la nuit" — 3:53
4. "Week-end Dance" — 3:29
- 12" maxi - France, the Netherlands
1. "La Vie la nuit" (extended remix) — 7:30
2. "La Vie la nuit" (French remix club) — 6:01
3. "La Vie la nuit" (radio version) — 3:50
- 7" single - Remix - France
1. "La Vie la nuit" (nightlife remix) — 3:51
2. "Week-end Dance" — 3:38
- 12" maxi - Remix - France, Spain, Ecuador
1. "La Vie la nuit" (extended remix) — 7:30
2. "La Vie la nuit" (radio version) — 3:50
3. "Week-end Dance" — 3:38

== Personnel ==
- Arrangement — Guy Mattéoni
- Artistic direction — Sacha Pichot
- Artwork — Patrick Regout
- Photography — Didier Olivré
- Remix — Pete Hammond

== Charts ==
=== Weekly charts ===
Chart (1988–1989)	Peak position
Belgium (Ultratop 50 Flanders)	32
Belgium (Ultratop 50 Wallonia)	3
Europe (European Hot 100)	9
France (SNEP)	2
Quebec (ADISQ)	3

=== Year-end charts ===
Chart (1989)	Position
Europe (Eurochart Hot 100)	49

== Certifications ==
Certifications for "La Vie la nuit"
Region	Certification	Certified units/sales
France (SNEP)	Gold	400,000^{*}
^{*} Sales figures based on certification alone.

== Release history ==
Country	Date	Format	Label
France	1988	CD maxi	CBS
France	1988	7" single	CBS
France	1988	12" maxi	CBS
France	1988	7" single - Remix	CBS
France	1988	12" maxi - Remix	CBS
Austria	1988	CD maxi	CBS
Netherlands	1988	7" single	CBS
Netherlands	1988	12" maxi	CBS
Spain	1988	12" maxi - Remix	CBS
Canada	1989	7" single	CBS
Ecuador	1989	12" maxi - Remix	CBS
