= Jardins d'enfants =

1989 single by Début de Soirée

Single by Début de Soirée

from the album Jardins d'enfants
- B-side: "Crocodiles cauchemar"
- Released: June 1989
- Recorded: 1988
- Genre: Euro disco, synth-pop
- Length: 4:21
- Label: CBS
- Composer(s): Claude Mainguy, Guy Mattéoni, Sacha Pichot
- Lyricist(s): William Picard

Début de Soirée singles chronology
"La Vie la nuit" (1989)	"Jardins d'enfants" (1989)	"Chance" (1989)

"Jardins d'enfants" is a 1988 song recorded by French pop duet Début de Soirée. Written by William Picard with a music composed by Claude Mainguy, Guy Mattéoni and Sacha Pichot, it was third second single from their album Jardins d'enfants on which it appears as the fifth track, and was released in June 1989. In France, it became a hit and remained the duet's last top ten.

== Music ==
Unlike Debut de Soirée's previous singles, "Jardins d'enfants" is a slow tempo song. The last couple of refrain is recorded with the participation of a choir, Les Petits Chanteurs d'Aix-en-Provence.

== Critical reception ==
A review in Pan-European magazine Music & Media presented "Jardins d'enfants" as being "another instantly likeable and easy to sing-along pop single".

== Chart performance ==
In France, "Jardins d'enfants" entered the singles chart at number 32 on the chart edition of 24 June 1989, reached the top ten three weeks later where it remained for six weeks, peaking at number five for two consecutive weeks, and fell off the top 50 after 14 weeks of presence. It was certified Silver disc by the Syndicat National de l'Édition Phonographique. On the European Hot 100 Singles, it debuted at number 74 on 15 July 1989, reached a peak of number 24 in its third week, and left the chart after its 13th week.

== Track listings ==
- 7" single - France
1. "Jardins d'enfants" — 4:21
2. "Crocodiles cauchemar" — 3:19
- CD maxi - France, Austria
1. "Jardins d'enfants" (45 tours version) — 4:22
2. "Jardins d'enfants" (remix) — 4:42
3. "Crocodiles cauchemar" — 4:34
- 12" maxi - France, Spain
1. "Jardins d'enfants" (remix) — 5:40
2. "Voix couplet" (a capella) — 0:20
3. "Voix refrain" (a capella) — 0:20
4. "Voix pont" (a Capella) — 0:28
5. "Jardins d'enfants" (45 tours version) — 4:21
6. "Crocodiles cauchemar" — 3:19

== Personnel ==
- Chorus — Les Petits Chanteurs d'Aix-en-Provence
- Photography — Gérard Levy
- Sleeve — RSCG

== Charts and sales ==
=== Weekly charts ===
Chart (1989)	Peak position
Europe (European Hot 100)	24
Finland (Suomen virallinen lista)	14
France (Airplay Chart [FM Stations])	16
France (SNEP)	5

=== Certifications ===
Certifications for "Jardins d'enfants"
Region	Certification	Certified units/sales
France (SNEP)	Silver	200,000^{*}
^{*} Sales figures based on certification alone.

== Release history ==
Country	Date	Format	Label
France	1989	CD maxi	CBS
France	1989	7" single	CBS
France	1989	12" maxi	CBS
Austria	1989	CD maxi	CBS
Spain	1989	12" maxi	CBS
