= Pour toi Arménie =

Single by Various French artists
- Released: February 1989
- Recorded: 1989
- Label: Trema-EMI
- Songwriters: Charles Aznavour (lyrics); Georges Garvarentz (music)
- Producers: Georges Garvarentz; Gérard Melet; Jacques Revaux

"Pour toi Arménie" (English translation: "For You, Armenia") is a 1989 song written and composed by Charles Aznavour, and recorded by a group of French singers (and also a few actors and TV presenters) who were popular at the time. This charity single was intended to raise funds to help the Armenians who experienced the 1988 Spitak earthquake. It sold more than 1 million copies under the Trema-EMI label.

== Background and writing ==
This song was entirely written and composed by Charles Aznavour and Georges Garvarentz which made a great tribute to the country of his ancestral origins and his relationship that he always have kept in his heart. After the earthquake in Armenia, he asked his singers, actors and TV presenters friends to sing with him "Pour toi Arménie", song devoted to help victims of this tragedy. At the same time, in the United Kingdom, the collective band named Rock Aid Armenia made a cover of "Smoke on the Water" also for the same charitable purpose.

== Vocalists ==
The artists that composed this group were :

- Adamo
- Serge Avedikian
- Marcel Amont
- Animo
- Rosy Armen
- Charles Aznavour
- Katia Aznavour
- Didier Barbelivien
- Phil Barney
- Gilbert Bécaud
- Jane Birkin
- Gérard Blanc
- Richard Bohringer
- Zani Boni
- Carlos
- Jean Carmet
- Jean-Pierre Cassel
- Alain Chamfort
- Frédéric Château
- Louis Chedid
- Julien Clerc
- Nicole Croisille
- Dallas
- David et Jonathan
- Michel Delpech
- Sacha Distel
- Dorothée
- Michel Drucker
- Yves Duteil
- Elsa

- Jean-Pierre Foucault
- Roland Giraud
- Richard Gotainer
- Félix Gray
- Serge Guirao
- Johnny Hallyday
- Robert Hossein
- Images
- Jairo
- Véronique Jannot
- Patricia Kaas
- Kimera
- David Koven
- Gilles Lacoste
- Jean-Luc Lahaye
- Francis Lalanne
- Serge Lama
- Philippe Lavil
- Herbert Léonard
- Lio
- Marie Myriam
- Didier Marouani
- Mireille Mathieu
- Fred Mella
- Macha Meryl
- Eddy Mitchell
- Pierre Mondy
- Gilbert Montagné
- Eric Morena
- Nana Mouskouri

- Georges Moustaki
- Thierry Mutin
- Nacash
- Nicoletta
- Florent Pagny
- Vanessa Paradis
- Popeck
- Jackie Quartz
- Rachid
- Serge Reggiani
- Renaud
- Line Renaud
- Pierre Richard
- Dick Rivers
- Patrick Sabatier
- Henri Salvador
- Michel Sardou
- Shushana
- Alain Souchon
- Linda de Suza
- Jean-Marc Thibault
- François Valéry
- Rosy Varte
- Hervé Vilard
- Marina Vlady
- Laurent Voulzy
- Jacques Weber
- Kirk Kirkoryan

All the names feature on the single's cover.

== Track listings ==
7" single

1. "Pour toi Arménie" – 4:05
2. "Ils sont tombés" – 4:06

The vinyl version of "Ils sont tombés" is recitated, unlike other versions.

== Chart performances ==
In France, "Pour toi Arménie" had an immediate huge success: it went straight to number one on the French SNEP Singles Chart edition of 11 February 1989 and remained atop for ten weeks, then dropped and left the chart after 18 weeks of presence. The same year, the single was certified Platinum disc by the French certifier, the Syndicat National de l'Édition Phonographique. It featured for a long time in the Guinness Book of Records as it was the first single to enter the French Singles Chart at number one. It was also the first appearance of Charles Aznavour on the French top 50. In addition, "Pour toi Arménie" was a top three hit in Belgium (Wallonia), and debuted at a peak of number four on the European Hot 100 Singles, and remained on the chart for 17 weeks.

== Italian version ==
An Italian version of the song, with the Aznavour's lyrics adapted in Italian by Andrea Lo Vecchio, was recorded with the title "Per te Armenia" in the Fonit Cetra studios. Together with the same Aznavour, involved artists included Fabrizio De André, Gino Paoli, Gigliola Cinquetti, Mia Martini, Milva, Iva Zanicchi, Sergio Endrigo, Dori Ghezzi, Eugenio Finardi, Enzo Jannacci, Pierangelo Bertoli, Sabrina Salerno, Mietta, Orietta Berti, I Camaleonti, Mino Reitano, Nilla Pizzi, Gazebo, Tullio De Piscopo, Gianni Bella, Franco Simone, Scialpi, Dario Baldan Bembo, Antonella Ruggiero, Lara Saint Paul, Tony Dallara, Ricky Gianco, Mario Castelnuovo, Alberto Radius, Pino D'Angiò, Christian, Memo Remigi, Gianfranco Manfredi, Francesco Baccini, Cristiano Malgioglio, Stefano Rosso, Mimmo Cavallo, Gilda Giuliani, Vivien Vee, Gepy & Gepy, Massimo Boldi, Alessandra Mussolini, Lorella Cuccarini. The B-side of the single was a narrated version of the lyrics, performed by Vittorio Gassman.

== Charts and certifications ==
=== Weekly charts ===
Chart (1989)	Peak position
Belgium (Ultratop 50 Wallonia)	3
Europe (European Hot 100)	4
France (SNEP)	1

=== Year-end charts ===
Chart (1989)	Position
Europe (European Hot 100)	36

=== Certifications ===
Certifications for "Pour toi Arménie"
Region	Certification	Certified units/sales
France (SNEP)	Platinum	800,000^{*}
^{*} Sales figures based on certification alone.
