= Éric Morena =

French singer (1951–2019)

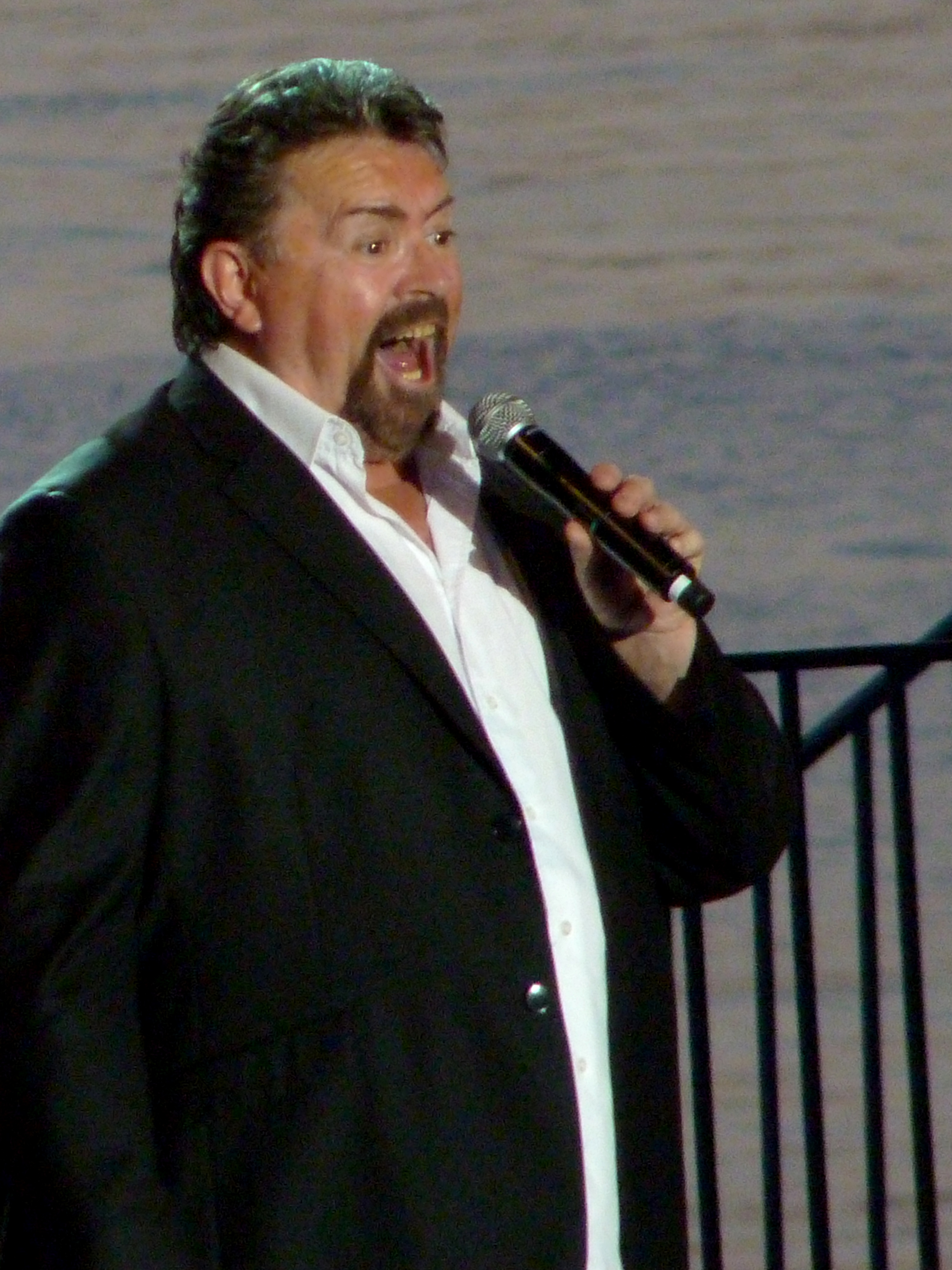
- Éric Morena performing at La Nuit des Hits of Juan-les-Pins for Enfant Star & Match association

Background information
- Born: 27 October 1951; Saint-Omer, France
- Died: 16 November 2019 (aged 68) Arcachon, France
- Genres: Pop
- Occupation: Singer
- Years active: 1987–1990

Éric Morena (27 October 1951 – 16 November 2019) was a French singer. He was born in Saint-Omer and was made famous by his 1987 humorous hit "Oh ! Mon bateau", which peaked at #22 in France. In 2003, he covered "L'Envie d'aimer" on the album Retour gagnant.

== Discography ==
=== Singles ===
- 1987 : "Oh ! Mon bateau" – #22 in France
- 1987 : "Dernier Matin d'Asie" (charity single recorded by Sampan) – # 22 in France
- 1988 : "Ramon et Pedro"
- 1988 : "Je suis le toréro de l'amour"
- 1989 : "Hissé...o"
- 1989 : "La fiesta morena"
- 1990 : "Pour toi Arménie" (charity single recorded by many artists) – #1 in France
