= Sacrebleu (album) =

Studio album by Dimitri from Paris
- Released: 11 June 1996
- Recorded: 1996
- Genres: Lounge; downtempo; house
- Length: 75:58
- Labels: Yellow; Atlantic; EastWest
- Producer: Dimitri from Paris

Dimitri from Paris chronology
Sacrebleu (1996)	A Night at the Playboy Mansion (2000)

Alternative cover
- Cover for North American release

Sacrebleu is the debut studio album by French electronic music producer Dimitri from Paris. It was first released on 11 June 1996 by Yellow Productions in France and later released by Atlantic Records in North America and EastWest Records in Europe and Japan.

Several of the album's tracks sample from lounge and bossa nova tracks of the 1950s and 1960s, as well as quotes from films such as Breakfast at Tiffany's, La Dolce Vita, 8½ and The Party.

== Critical reception ==
Professional ratings
Review scores
Source	Rating
AllMusic	4.5/5 stars
Entertainment Weekly	A−
Muzik	4.5/5
Q	4/5 stars
Rolling Stone	3.5/5 stars
Select	4/5
Spin	8/10

In a contemporary review of Sacrebleu, Will Hermes of Entertainment Weekly wrote, "Like French fromage, it often smells funny, but when it's good, it's marvelous." Retrospectively, John Bush of AllMusic described the record as "a breezy collection of what could be loosely termed house music", albeit one "indebted to a variety of intriguing styles reminiscent of the Continent around the mid-part of the century", and praised it as an "immensely enjoyable album".

== Track listing ==
French edition
No.	Title	Length
1.	"Prologue"	0:36
2.	"Sacre Francais"	4:54
3.	"Monsieur Dimitri Joue Du Stylophone"	1:02
4.	"Nothing to Lose"	4:58
5.	"Un Termede"	0:46
6.	"Reveries" (edit)	3:43
7.	"Attente Musicale"	1:07
8.	"Dirty Larry"	5:22
9.	"Free Ton Style"	3:52
10.	"Un Terlude"	2:25
11.	"Une Very Stylish Fille"	3:18
12.	"Un Woman's Paradis"	3:15
13.	"Back in the Daze"	8:02
14.	"Le Moogy Reggae"	5:07
15.	"Encore Un Terlude"	0:46
16.	"Un World Mysteriouse"	4:09
17.	"Par Un Chemin Different"	6:30
18.	"Nothing to Lose (Lounge Instrumentale)"	4:42
19.	"Epilogue" / "Souvenirs de Paris"	9:20

North American edition
No.	Title	Length
1.	"Prologue"	0:36
2.	"Sacre Francais"	4:54
3.	"Monsieur Dimitri Joue Du Stylophone"	1:02
4.	"Nothing to Lose"	4:58
5.	"Un Termede"	0:46
6.	"Reveries" (edit)	3:43
7.	"Attente Musicale"	1:07
8.	"Dirty Larry" (Crue-L Grand Orchestra Remix)	8:04
9.	"Un Terlude"	2:25
10.	"Une Very Stylish Fille"	3:18
11.	"Love Love Mode"	7:05
12.	"Un Woman's Paradis"	3:15
13.	"Back in the Daze"	8:02
14.	"Le Moogy Reggae"	5:07
15.	"Encore Un Terlude"	0:46
16.	"Un World Mysteriouse"	4:09
17.	"Par Un Chemin Different"	6:30
18.	"Nothing to Lose (Lounge Instrumentale)" / "Epilogue" / "Tojours L' Amore"	10:11
