= Dimitri from Paris =

French music producer and DJ

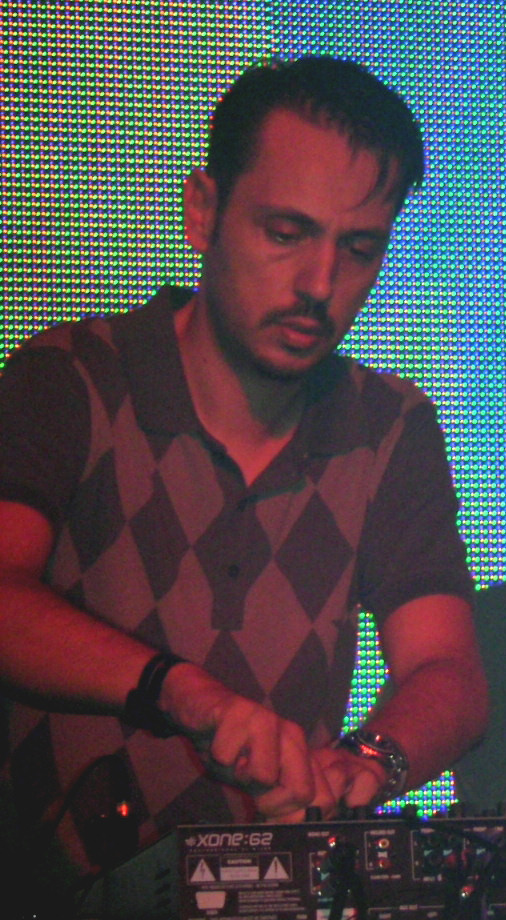
- Dimitri from Paris in 2005.

Background information
- Also known as: Dimitri Yerasimos
- Born: Dimitrios Yerasimos; 27 October 1963 (age 62); Istanbul, Turkey
- Origin: Paris, France
- Genres: Lounge, electronica, downtempo, house, shibuya-kei, French house
- Occupations: composer, DJ, remixer, record producer
- Years active: 1987–present
- Labels: Yellow Productions; ITH Records
- Website: www.dimitrifromparis.com

Dimitrios Yerasimos (Greek: Δημήτριος Γεράσιμος, Dimítrios Yerásimos; born 27 October 1963), better known as Dimitri from Paris, is a French music producer, DJ and composer of Greek descent. His musical influences are rooted in 1970s funk and disco sounds that spawned contemporary house music, as well as original soundtracks from 1950s and 1960s movies such as Breakfast at Tiffany's, La Dolce Vita and The Party, which were sampled in his album Sacrebleu. Yerasimos fused these sounds with electro and block party hip-hop he discovered in the 1980s.

== Life and career ==
Contrary to his musical pseudonym, Yerasimos was born not in Paris but in Istanbul, Turkey. His family relocated to France where he discovered DJing at home, using whatever he could find to "cut and paste" samples from disco hits or in to montages heard on the radio, blending them together to make tapes. This early experimentation helped him launch his DJ career.

=== Early career ===
He started out by DJing at the French station Radio 7, before moving on to Skyrock and finally to Radio NRJ, Europe's largest FM radio network, in 1986. There, he introduced the first ever house music show to be broadcast in France, while simultaneously producing under the direction of sound designer Michel Gaubert, runway soundtracks for fashion houses such as Chanel, Jean-Paul Gaultier, Hermès and Yves Saint-Laurent. He also released two solo EPs from 1993 to 1994 and contributed to the Yellow Productions compilation La Yellow 357.

=== Recording career ===
In 1996, Yerasimos gained worldwide recognition with the release of his first full album, Sacrebleu, released on Yellow Productions. A blend of diverse influences including jazz, original film soundtracks, samba, and organic house, Sacrebleu sold 300,000 copies worldwide and was named Album of the Year by UK's Mixmag magazine.

In 2000, Yerasimos followed Sacrebleu up with A Night at the Playboy Mansion (Virgin) and Disco Forever (BBE), followed by My Salsoul in 2001, After the Playboy Mansion in 2002. In 2003, Cruising Attitude was released, to be closely followed by his first outing on UK's premier dance music label Defected: Dimitri from Paris In the House.

In the 1990s, Yerasimos provided soundtracks for advertising campaigns, haute couture events and runway shows in collaboration with fashion houses including Chanel, Karl Lagerfeld, Jean Paul Gaultier and Yves Saint Laurent. He has remixed hundreds of artists as diverse as Björk, The Cardigans, James Brown, Michael Jackson, New Order and Quincy Jones. Yerasimos created the music for the opening theme of the anime Tsukuyomi: Moon Phase and mixed the soundtrack for the French luxury dessin animé Jet Groove produced by Method Films.

=== Recent developments ===
2005 saw Yerasimos go back to his Funk and Disco roots, with Japanese hip-hop producer and über collector DJ Muro for Super Disco Friends a double CD mixdown. In 2006 he offered his House of Love outing to Valentine's Day's lovers. Later on Yerasimos produced Los Amigos Invisibles "Super Pop Venezuela" album which grabbed a nomination for a Grammy Award.

2007 saw the release of the Cocktail Disco project with label BBE. Yerasimos described in the notes to the project that he arrived to the material through a "kind of evolution in music collecting [where] the more you complete one genre, the more you move to a sub genre, a sub, sub genre, eventually branching out to different musical paths, to avoid being stuck in dead ends. It turns out records I would overlook a few years back, are the ones I feverishly hunt now. One of many such sub genres I grew up to love over the years, is a type of Disco that I could best describe as Cocktail Disco."

Yerasimos described the Cocktail Disco sub-genre as having "that ubiquitous 4/4 beat and flying open high hat, complemented by rich orchestrations, campy over the top vocals, and an often tropical latin vibe. Something that wouldn't feel out of place in a Broadway musical." He also pointed out that he believes "the same style was called Sleaze back in its days, from roughly 1976 to 1979. There were even DJs specialized in the Sleaze sound which was usually played after hours, in spots with a strong sex-oriented drive."

The Cocktail Disco compilation includes tracks from Astrud Gilberto, Blue Velvets, the Ritchie Family and Paul Mauriat ("The Joy of You", from his New York-recorded disco album collaboration with Gérard Gambus Overseas Call).

2009 saw the release of the Night Dubbin', a post-disco R&B compilation remix album.

== Discography ==
=== Studio albums ===
- Sacrebleu, 1996
- Cruising Attitude, 2003

=== Compilation albums ===
- Monsieur Dimitri's De-Luxe House of Funk, 1997
- A Night at the Playboy Mansion, 2000
- Disco Forever, 2000
- My Salsoul, 2001
- After the Playboy Mansion, 2002
- In the House, 2004
- Neko Mimi Mode, 2004
- The Kings of Disco, 2004 compiled by Dimitri from Paris and Joey Negro
- TV Tokyo Animation Tsukuyomi–Moon Phase– Best Collection "Zenbu, Kikitakunacchatta...", 2005
- Super Disco Friends, 2005 compiled by Dimitri from Paris and DJ Muro
- Southport Weekender, 2005 compiled by Dimitri from Paris, Jazzie B, and Quentin Harris
- In the House of Love, 2006
- Cocktail Disco, 2007
- Return to the Playboy Mansion, 2008
- Night Dubbin', 2009 compiled by Dimitri from Paris & The Idjut Boys
- Get Down With The Philly Sound, 2010
- Knights of the Playboy Mansion, 2011
- The Remix Files, 2011
- Back In The House, 2012
- In the House of Disco, 2014
- Dimitri From Paris Presents Le CHIC Remix, 2018

=== Remixes ===
- Gérard Blanc – Une Autre Histoire
- Stardust – Music Sounds Better With You
- Mark Ronson – Nothing Breaks Like a Heart
- Jackson 5 – I Want You Back
- Daft Punk – Get Lucky
- Jamiroquai – Cosmic Girl
- Fine Young Cannibals – She Drives Me Crazy
- Bananarama – Dimitri's Megamix
