= Nacash =

French singing group

- Origin: France
- Genres: World music, French variety songs
- Years active: 1980–present
- Labels: Wagram, Carrère, EMI, Polygram
- Members: Alain Nakache; Claude Nakache; Gérard Nakache; Norbert Nakache; Marc Nakache

Nacash (sometimes Brothers Nacash or Les Frères Nacash) is a singing group based in France singing French variety songs and world music. The band is composed of five brothers, sons of Algerian Jewish Cheikh Alexandre Nakache, a master of Andalusian classical music who immigrated to France in 1962 with his family. The band released albums and singles spanning from the 1980s to presently with the single "Elle imagine" written as a tribute to their sister, becoming their biggest hit.

== Songwriting and production ==
The Nacash brothers are also songwriters and record producers in their own right. Beginning of the 1990s, they discovered singer Ophélie Winter co-producing her debut album No Soucy!, and co-writing her single "Dieu m'a donné la foi", that reached number 1 in French Top 50 selling over 600,000 copies and that was certified double gold and eventually platinum. It was followed by her album, Shame On U, that also went platinum with more than 500,000 copies sold. Her fame prompted Paisley Park Records, Prince's label to solicit the Nacash brothers to allow her recording with the American label.

In 1997, Norbert and Marc had great success for their production of "Hasta Siempre Che Guevara" sung by the Argentine model Ines Rivero and Alain had a success with co-producing albums for singer Helene Segara Coeur de verre in 1996 and Au nom d'une femme in 2000, selling 800,000 copies and the success of the Segara singles "Les Vallées d'Irlande" and "Parlez moi de nous" etc. The brothers also worked with Chiméne Badi as songwriters of her hit "Tu me manques déjà" and in 1998, they discovered Yael Naim producing his debut album In a Man's Womb.

Other artists they collaborated with include American rapper J Five that was produced by Norbert and Marc Nacash, Chris Richard for whom they wrote his hit "Modern Times" in association with M6 music station and NRJ radio, another number 1 in French Top 50, becoming an international hit charting in Belgium, Netherland, Italy, and Japan.

== Various projects ==
In 1988, they participated in the charity release Les enfants sans Noël and in 1989, they took part in Pour toi Arménie charity album. In 2010, Gérard and Claude Nacash collaborated with Hamdi Benani for concerts in Malouf genre, a type of Andalusian classical music of the Maghreb, and had notable collaboration with Enrico Macias and Ishtar Alabina in a series of concerts in 2013.

== Members ==
The five members of the band are:

- Alain Nakache, born 6 February 1947
- Claude Nakache, born 2 February 1948
- Gérard Nakache, born 12 March 1949
- Norbert Nakache, born 19 February 1954
- Marc Nakache, born 3 May 1957

== Discography ==
=== Albums ===
- 1992: Raçine
- 1992: Des matins calmes (compilation)
- 1997: Best of (compilation)
- 2011: Un beau dimanche d'été

=== Singles ===
(Credited to Nacash, except for where indicated otherwise)

- 1976: "Zendal" (credited to Nacash Brothers)
- 1984: "Sensuela" (credited to Nacash Latino)
- 1987: "Elle imagine"
- 1988: "Y'a des jours comme ça"
- 1989: "Il faut du temps (Shalom et Salam)"
- 1990: "La Petite Alice"
- 1992: "Les Orientales"

=== Compositions / Productions ===
- 1995: Ophélie Winter - "Dieu m'a donné la foi" (#1 in France)
- 1996: Ophélie Winter - "Shame On U"
- 1997: Ines Rivero - "Hasta Siempre Che Guevara"
- 1998: Hélène Ségara - "Les vallées d'Irlande"
- 1999: Hélène Ségara - "Parlez moi de nous"
- 2000: Loubna Maher - "Dans ces moments là"
- 2001: Chiméne Badi - "Tu me manques déjà"
- 2001: Yael Naim - "In a Man's Womb"
- 2004: J Five - "Modern Times" (#1 in France)
- 2005: J Five - "Find a Way"
