= Début de Soirée =

French pop duo

- Origin: France
- Genres: Euro disco, dance-pop, new wave
- Years active: 1984-2004, 2026
- Members: William Picard; Sacha Goëller
- Website: http://www.debut-de-soiree.com/

Début de Soirée (French pronunciation: [deby d(ə) swaʁe], literally Beginning of the Evening) is a French pop music duo which had a huge success in 1988 with their song "Nuit de folie", a number-one single in France.

== History ==
Released for the first time in 1984 while the 2 singers were DJ in nightclubs in the south of France, the song "Nuit de folie" didn't meet success. They had difficulties in finding a record company to re-release a new version in 1988. However, the song was a great success : "Nuit de folie" was even the best-selling single of 1988 in France. It is currently still regarded as a classic dance music song.

The band stopped performing in 2004, But occasionally release remixes of their previous work. On August 14, 2026 they are scheduled to perform at the Festival La Nuit Des Étoiles in Le Folgoët, France.

== Members ==
- William Picard (singer, songwriter)
- Sacha Goëller (singer)

== Discography ==
=== Singles ===
With peak positions and certifications in France :

- "Nuit de folie" (1988) - #1 (x 9) in France, Platinum
- "La Vie la nuit" (1989) - #2 in France, Gold
- "Jardins d'enfants" (1989) - #5 in France, Silver
- "Chance" (1989) - #30 in France
- "Belles belles belles" (1990) - #49 in France
- "De Révolution en Satisfaction" (1991)
- "Nuit de folie (Version Dance Club 1995)" (1995)
- "Nuit de folie" (Remix) (1999) - #72 in France
- "Nuit de folie 2009" (2009)
- "La vie la nuit/Week-end dance (Special Edition" (2021)
- "Jardins d'enfants/Crocodiles cauchemar (Special Edition)" (2021)

=== Albums ===
- Jardins d'enfants (1989) - Gold
- Tous les paradis (1991)
- Faut pas exagérer (1996)
- Best of (1996)
- Le Jerk (2020)
- Nuit de folie - Tout pour la danse (Special Edition (2021)
