= Thierry Mutin =

French opera singer

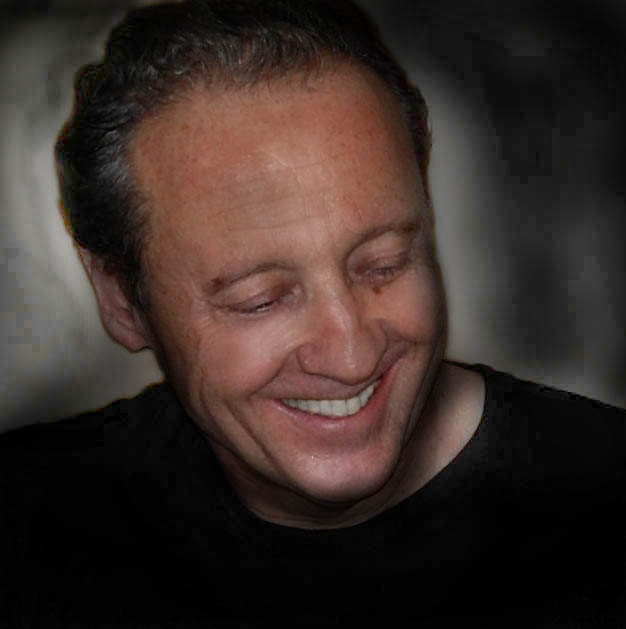
- Thierry Mutin in 2009

Background information
- Birth name: Thierry Mutin
- Origin: France
- Occupation(s): Singer, songwriter
- Years active: 1984–?

Thierry Mutin is a French singer of classical music and songwriter (born in Rochechouart, Haute-Vienne), famous for his 1988 hit single "Sketch of Love".

== Biography ==
In 1984, Thierry Mutin released the single "Milliardaire comme personne". In 1988, he recorded in English-language the song "Sketch of Love", based on the suite n°11 (sarabande) of Georg Friedrich Haendel, which achieved success in France (#3 on the SNEP Singles Chart, Gold disc). In 1989, he participated in the charity single "Pour toi Arménie", led by Charles Aznavour. He published the albums Talisman in 1990, whose music was composed by Jean-Pierre Bourtayre, and Chants du Monde Nouveau in 1995. He also wrote some songs for Jean-Jacques Lafon.
