= Burning Like a Flame =

Single by Dokken

from the album Back for the Attack
- Released: December 1987 (US)
- Genre: Heavy metal; glam metal
- Length: 4:46
- Label: Elektra Records
- Songwriters: Mick Brown, Don Dokken, George Lynch, Jeff Pilson
- Producer: Neil Kernon

Dokken singles chronology
"Dream Warriors" (1987)	"Burning Like a Flame" (1987)	"Heaven Sent" (1988)

Music video
- "Burning Like a Flame" on YouTube

"Burning Like a Flame" is a song by American heavy metal band Dokken, released in 1987 on the album Back for the Attack. The song peaked at number 20 on the Album Rock Tracks chart and at number 72 on the Billboard Hot 100 in the United States.

== Track listing ==
7" single

Side A
No.	Title	Length
1.	"Burning Like a Flame"	4:46

Side B
No.	Title	Length
1.	"Lost Behind the Wall"	4:19

UK 12" single

Side A
No.	Title	Length
1.	"Burning Like a Flame"	4:46
2.	"Lost Behind the Wall"	4:19

Side B
No.	Title	Length
1.	"Just Got Lucky"	4:35
2.	"In My Dreams"	4:01

European 12" single

Side A
No.	Title	Length
1.	"Burning Like a Flame"	4:44

Side B
No.	Title	Length
1.	"Lost Behind the Wall"	4:18
2.	"Back for the Attack"	3:51

== Charts ==
Chart (1987–1988)	Peak position
UK Singles (OCC)	78
US Billboard Hot 100	72
US Album Rock Tracks (Billboard)	20
