= Yaka dansé =

1987 single by Raft

Single by Raft

from the album Madagascar
- B-side: "Leisure"
- Released: August 1987
- Recorded: 1987
- Studio: Studio Gang (recording); Studio Gang (mixing)
- Genre: Reggae, pop
- Length: 3:47
- Label: Polydor
- Songwriter: Christian Fougeron
- Producer: Philippe Cohen-Solal

Raft singles chronology
"It's Growing Light" (1986)	"Yaka dansé" (1987)	"Femmes du Congo" (1988)

"Yaka dansé", also titled "Yaka dansé (l'aborigène)" on the disc of the various formats as there is an "aborigène mix", is a 1987 reggae song recorded by French band Raft. Written and composed by band's singer Christian Fougeron, it was released in August 1987 and became the first single from Raft's 1989 second album Madagascar, on which it appears as the tenth track in a remixed version. Praised by critics, it was particularly appreciated for its deep lyrics under an innocent appearance, dealing with racism and decolonization, and its catchy rhythm. It was a successful hit in France, peaking at number two, and can be considered as Raft's signature song.

== Background, lyrics and music ==
Raft member Christian Fougeron explained in an interview: "The inspiration for the song's music came to us when we were in a bus to take our plane: an ambulance overtook us and its siren clicked in my mind". Musically, "Yaka dansé" is a reggae song with percussions by Jean Schultheis and the trumpet by a musician from French band Niagara; the words play with the sounds and become singing onomatopoeias. Lyrically, it deals with serious topics: politics, racism, religion (it mentions God and Virgin Mary), genocides, war, "celebrate the richness of difference" and is a hymn to toleration. It evokes events linked to the decolonization of New Caledonia in 1987, a relevant topic at the time as there was a referendum on the independence of the island in September of that year (with a 98% reject), which led to violences between Kanak indigenous and French settlers. As for the title, Fougeron said it was chosen "to counterbalance the text dealing with serious subjects and at the same time to bring lightness: we sing, we dance, we love each other". It was the band's first song written in French. Retrospectively, in 2016, Fourgeron said about "Yaka dansé": "I was far from thinking that this song would have that course and that 30 years later, the themes addressed would still be relevant... more than ever even".

== Critical reception ==
"Yaka dansé" was well-received by critics. According to Elia Habib, an expert of the French charts, "this warm text illuminates the autumnal gray weather". A review in the Pan-European magazine Music & Media praised the song, electing "single of the week" on 3 October 1987, and stated: "This duo delivers the next European hit: a cheerful pop reggae tune with an enchanting chorus. With its commercial appeal, a record that deserves to be released all ever Europe!" This anticolonialist song is listed by Bertrand Dicale as a song that builds history and his analysis is an available pedagogic tool for school teachers.

== Cover versions ==
In 2004, "Yaka dansé" was covered by Soma Riba, a member of Collectif Métissé, who released it as a single; this version peaked at number 27 in France and number 40 in Belgium (Flanders).

== Chart performance ==
In France, "Yaka dansé" debuted at number 45 on the chart edition of 5 September 1987, then climbed every week and eventually peaked at number two for non consecutive four weeks, being blocked from the number one spot by Los Lobos's hit "La Bamba"; it remained for 13 weeks in the top ten and 23 weeks in the top 50, and earned a Gold disc awarded by the Syndicat National de l'Édition Phonographique. It peaked at number 23 in Belgium (Flanders) where it charted for four weeks. It entered the European Top 100 at number 84 on 3 October 1987, reached a peak of number 23 ten weeks later where it stayed for two weeks, and fell off the chart after 19 weeks of presence. Regularly played on radio, it reached number 31 on the European Airplay Top 50 on 7 November 1987, and charted for a total of eight weeks.

== Track listings ==
- 7" single - France, Germany, Spain
1. "Yaka dansé" — 3:47
2. "Leisure" — 2:45 (lyrics and music by Pierre Schott)
- 12" maxi - France, Spain
1. "Yaka dansé" (aborigène mix) — 5:28
2. "Yaka dansé" (original version) — 3:47
3. "Leisure" — 2:45 (lyrics and music by Pierre Schott)
- 12" maxi - Germany
1. "Yaka dansé" (aborigène mix) — 5:28
2. "Leisure" — 2:48 (lyrics and music by Pierre Schott)
3. "Yaka dansé" (original mix) — 3:58

== Personnel ==
- Arranged by Victor Dam
- Backing Vocals — Christine Lidon, Véronique De Launay
- Engineer — Olivier Do Espirito Santo
- Engineer and mixing — Jean-Pierre Janiaud
- Photography — Gilles Cappé

== Charts ==
=== Weekly charts ===
Chart (1987–1988)	Peak position
Belgium (Ultratop 50 Flanders)	23
Europe (European Airplay Top 50)	31
Europe (European Hot 100)	23
France (SNEP)	2
Quebec (ADISQ)	16

=== Certifications ===
Certifications for "Yaka dansé"
Region	Certification	Certified units/sales
France (SNEP)	Gold	500,000^{*}
^{*} Sales figures based on certification alone.

== Release history ==
Country	Date	Format	Label
France	1987	7" single	Polydor
France	1987	12" maxi	Polydor
Germany	1988	7" single	ZYX Records
Germany	1988	12" maxi	ZYX Records
Spain	1988	7" single	AVC
Spain	1988	12" maxi	AVC

== See also ==
- 1987 New Caledonian independence referendum
- Decolonisation of Oceania
