= Ricercare Concertante (Llácer Pla) =

The Ricercare Concertante for Two Pianos and Orchestra is a musical composition by Spanish composer Francisco Llácer Pla written in 1987 at the age of 69. It was premiered and recorded by pianists Ana Bogani and Fernando Puchol and the Valencia Municipal Orchestra conducted by Manuel Galduf. It is a fusion of the ricercar form and the concertante genre through a mirrored structure around a cello solo featuring two cadenzas for the soloists.
