= Raft (band) =

French pop band

- Origin: France
- Genre: Pop
- Years active: 1985–1990
- Past members: Christian Fourgeron; Pierre Schott

Raft is a French pop band active in the 1980s, most notable for their 1987 hit single, "Yaka dansé".

== Biography ==
The band was a duet composed of Christian Fourgeron (guitar, vocals) and Pierre Schott (guitar, bass, vocals, born 24 April 1958). They begin their musical career in 1985 with their single "Io (c'est ça)" which passed unnoticed in France. However, in 1987, they had their first hit with "Yaka dansé (l'arborigène)", which was a number 2 hit in France, and earned a gold disc. The single was succeeded by "Femmes du Congo", which achieved a moderate success in comparison. The band's songs contained many puns and dealt with grave themes of society, sung on joyful music. In 1988, they released their first album entitled Madagascar and was the opening act for Niagara's concerts. In 1990, the band split up and both members started a solo career.

More recently, the reformed group participated in the concert tour named RFM Party 80, which started in 2006.

== Discography ==
=== Raft ===
==== Albums ====
- 1985: It's Growing Light
- 1989: Madagascar

==== Singles ====
- 1985: "Io (c'est ça)"
- 1987: "Yaka dansé" - #2 in France (gold disc)
- 1988: "Femmes du Congo" - #20 in France
- 1989: "Didimdam (dimdam)"
- 1989: "Sea, Sun and Sensy"
- 1990: "Debout gazelles"

==== Collaborations ====
- 1988: "Dernier Matin d'Asie", a charity single recorded by many artists under the name Sampan

=== Christian Fougeron ===
- 1994 : Christian Fougeron

=== Pierre Schott ===
- 1992 : Le Nouveau Monde
- 1994 : Le Retour à la vie sauvage
- 1998 : Le Milieu du grand nulle part
- 2007 : Zenland...
