= 1987 in South Korean music =

The following is a list of notable events and releases that happened in 1987 in music in South Korea.

== Debuting and disbanded in 1987 ==
=== Groups ===
- Sobangcha

=== Soloists ===
- Yoo Jae-ha

== Releases in 1987 ==
=== January ===
Date	Title	Artist	Genre(s)

=== February ===
Date	Title	Artist	Genre(s)

=== March ===
Date	Title	Artist	Genre(s)
5	Overture	Na-mi	Dance pop
10	When Love Passes By	Lee Moon-sae	Ballad

=== April ===
Date	Title	Artist	Genre(s)
20	None	Sobangcha	K-pop

=== May ===
Date	Title	Artist	Genre(s)
7	Alone in Front of the Yard	Kim Wan-sun	K-pop
10	Love and Life and Me!	Cho Yong-pil	Folk-pop

=== June ===
Date	Title	Artist	Genre(s)
10	Down and Up	Sinawe	Heavy metal

=== July ===
Date	Title	Artist	Genre(s)

=== August ===
Date	Title	Artist	Genre(s)
20	Because I Love You	Yoo Jae-ha	K-pop

=== September ===
Date	Title	Artist	Genre(s)

=== October ===
Date	Title	Artist	Genre(s)

=== November ===
Date	Title	Artist	Genre(s)
—N/a	Remember	Boohwal	Heavy metal

=== December ===
Date	Title	Artist	Genre(s)

=== N/A ===
Date	Title	Artist	Genre(s)

== Deaths ==
- Yoo Jae-ha, singer-songwriter
