= Nuit de folie =

1988 single by Début de Soirée

Single by Début de Soirée

from the album Jardins d'enfants
- B-side: "Tout pour la danse"
- Released: June 1988; January 2000 (remix)
- Recorded: 1988, France
- Genre: Euro disco
- Length: 4:16
- Label: CBS
- Songwriters: William Picard, Claude Mainguy, Sauveur Pichot
- Producer: Bel Air Studio

Début de Soirée singles chronology
"Nuit de folie" (1988)	"La Vie la nuit" (1988)

"Nuit de folie" (French pronunciation: [nɥi də fɔli], literally "Night of madness") is a song by French pop duo Début de Soirée from their first studio album, Jardins d'enfants. It was released in June 1988 as their debut single. It became the summer hit of the year in France, topping the charts for over two months. A remixed version was released in 2000, but was unsuccessful.

== Background ==
"Nuit de folie" was written and composed by both members of the duo with the intention of creating a summer hit. It was difficult for the duo to find a record company that believed in the potential of the song, but a contract was eventually signed with Sony. In 1988, the song received heavy promotion on various television shows. According to Elia Habib, an expert of French charts, the song is characterized by a "rapid and lively rhythm, a very simple refrain therefore easy to remember, a tune that becomes embedded in the eardrums, lyrics referring to summer festive atmosphere". It also contains a brief rap section before the last chorus. A version of the song had been released in 1984, but was unsuccessful. The arrangement of the better-known 1988 version was heavily inspired by that of "You're My Love, You're My Life" by German singer Patty Ryan.

The duo's second single, "La Vie la nuit", released in December 1988, contains a sample from the introduction of "Nuit de folie" near the end of the song.

== Music video ==
The video for "Nuit de folie" features the duo performing a choreography of different movements against various backgrounds. They are accompanied by three women, each with a plain dress in a different colour (the short woman in yellow, the obese woman in red, and the tall woman in green). During the last chorus, two couples are formed, and the obese woman remains alone.

In an interview, the duo stated they disliked seeing the music video aired on television, as they felt it was "antiquated".

== Critical reception ==
A review in Pan-European magazine Music & Media described "Nuit de folie" as a production from the "French equivalent of Modern Talking" and "a typical good-time summer hit" with "an inescapable hook and "a nice pop rap in the middle". Another issue of the magazine states: "One cannot resist being infatuated when hearing [this] pop disco single", adding that it has "one of the most charming choruses to be heard for a long time" with an "unpretentious, but highly convincing production".

== Charts performance ==
In France, "Nuit de folie" entered the singles chart at number 39 on 11 June 1988. In its sixth week, the single reached number one, where it peaked for nine consecutive weeks. After being dislodged by Elsa and Glenn Medeiros's hit "Un Roman d'amitié (Friend You Give Me a Reason)", it stayed for five weeks at number two, spending a total of 22 weeks in the top ten and 30 weeks in the top fifty. It was certified platinum by the Syndicat National de l'Édition Phonographique for over one million units. In Wallonia, it topped the chart for seven weeks non-consecutively, alternating with "Un Roman d'amitié (Friend You Give Me a Reason)", and remained in the top three for 14 weeks. It also reached the top-ten in Flanders and the top-25 in the Netherlands. On the European Hot 100 Singles, it debuted at number 89 on 2 July 1988, reached a peak of number three in its thirteenth week, and spent 26 weeks on the chart, eleven of which were in the top ten.

Remixed versions of the song for nightclubs were released in 1995 and 2000, none of which were successful.

== Uses in the media ==
The song was covered by a band in Fabien Onteniente's 2006 film Camping.

== Track listings ==
- 7" single
1. "Nuit de folie" (euro remix) — 3:52
2. "Tout pour la danse" — 3:15
- CD maxi
1. "Nuit de folie" — 4:16
2. "Tout pour la danse" — 3:14
3. "Nuit de folie" (extended version) — 6:23
- 12" maxi
1. "Nuit de folie" (crazy night remix) — 6:40
2. "Nuit de folie" (French mix club) — 6:40
- 12" maxi
1. "Nuit de folie" (extended version) — 6:25
2. "Tout pour la danse" — 3:15
3. "Nuit de folie" (a capella chœur) — 0:50
4. "Nuit de folie" (a capella vois rap) — 0:40
- CD maxi - 1995 remixes
1. "Nuit de folie" (dance club remix) — 6:40
2. "Nuit de folie" (remix edit radio) — 3:42
3. "Nuit de folie" (hard version) — 5:20
4. "Nuit de folie" (space version) — 5:15
- CD single - 2000 remixes
1. "Nuit de folie" (edit radio 2000) — 4:08
2. "Nuit de folie" (karaoke version) — 4:09

== Credits ==
Original version

- Lyrics : William Picard and Claude Mainguy
- Music : Sauveur Pichot
- Production : Bel Air Studio
- Remixed by "Mixmaster" Pete Hammond

1995 remixes

- Arranged and remixed by Rick Pier O'Neil and Yann Asting at Studio Sunday Light

== Charts ==
=== Weekly charts ===
1988 weekly chart performance
Chart (1988)	Peak position
Belgium (Ultratop 50 Flanders)	10
Belgium (Ultratop 50 Wallonia)	1
Europe (European Hot 100)	3
France (SNEP)	1
Netherlands (Dutch Top 40 Tipparade)	5
Netherlands (Single Top 100)	24

2000 weekly chart performance
Chart (2000)	Peak position
France (SNEP) 2000 remix	72

=== Year-end charts ===
1988 year-end chart performance for "Nuit de folie"
Chart (1988)	Position
Belgian (Ultratop Flanders)	28
Europe (European Hot 100)	8
French (SNEP)	1

== Certifications ==
Certifications for "Nuit de folie"
Region	Certification	Certified units/sales
France (SNEP)	Platinum	1,000,000^{*}
^{*} Sales figures based on certification alone.

== See also ==
- List of number-one singles of 1988 (France)
