= Francisco Llácer Pla =

Francisco Llácer Pla (1918 in Valencia – 2002 in Valencia) was a Spanish composer and choral conductor. He was one of the first Valencian composers who assimilated the postwar avantgarde approaches, combining it with lyricism and echoes of the Valencian folklore. Tomás Marco wrote: Llácer Pla offers a new, suggestive vision of a form of musical nationalism from a new, progressive perspective. A professor at the Valencia Conservatory, several of his progressive works are based in his harmonic investigations, such as his concept of heptafonism and his theory of the "balanced chord", based on the double sense of the sonorous bodies' resonance.

On October 7, 2005 he was named Valencia's favorite son.

== Quotes ==
I work on a preliminary design of the material, but not just at an harmonic level. On the base of the dodecaphonic series I first construct a linear design, which usually has consequences in the verticality of the music, since my balanced chords are usually intimately bounded with the linear design. Sometimes two balanced chords generate the dodecaphonic range which I use as a sonorous background from where I extract the thematic material. I believe that maybe, in my preconscious, though in an unclear way, there's always an explorative eagerness.

== Incomplete list of works ==
Vocal-Orchestral	Orchestral	Chamber	Vocal	Solo
1957: Tres lieder y una coplilla (s orc); 1964: Himno de la enfermera (wc orc); 1971: Himne del jardiner (mc orc); 1974: Migraciones (s orc); 1991: Te Deum (satb c orc)	1954: El bosque de Opta (SP); 1956: Rondó mirmidón 1959: Aguafuertes de una novela (SS); 1962: Zoco esclavo y Marcha oriental (cb); 1962: Sincrección-Divertimento (sor); 1969: Balada heptafónica (sor); 1978: Amén de Folies; 1984: Piano Concerto; 1987: Ricercare concertante (2p orc)	1964: Inventions for six instruments 1970: Ciclos (v p); 1972: Cançó per a la intimitat (v p); 1974: Motete para el día sexto (sqa); 1977: Episodios concertantes (g, soc, pe); 1979: Huellas (vc p); 1980: La otra trova heptafónica (vc p); 1981: Liturgia II (wqi); 1985: Tenebrae (f p); 1987: Textura y tropos (f p); 1992: Relatando imágenes (h p); 1997: Hacia el anochecer (v db); 1998: Elegía a una mirada (v vc); 2001: Arquitecturas del silencio (va db)	1953: Campanar de Benigànim (wc); 1954: Tríptico popular (cc); 1956: Primavera en hivern (c); 1959: Al bon Déu (cc); 1960: Cançoneta dels innocents (cc org); 1966: Missa puericia (cc org); 1966: Cançons per a la intimitat (s f c b p); 1972: Lamentació de Tirant lo Blanc (c); 1973: Tres ratlles curtes (cc); 1975: Ajonetes (cc); 1977: Loors de la Santísima Creu (s p)	1954: Prelude (p); 1955: Piano Sonata; 1956: Noctámbulo (p); 1960: Piano Sonatina; 1961: Salida (org); 1963: Pentámero (h); 1977: Liturgia I (org); 1981: Dístico percutiente (p); 1986: Espacios sugerentes (p); 1986: Versus in conmemoratione Ioannis Cabanilles (org); 1988: Plurívoco (p); 1990: Come ouverture alla italiana (g); 1991: Jucunde et Pacificus (p); 1994: Breve Sonata mudante (p); 1996: Music for Prepared Harpsichord; 1997: Pavesa célica (p); 2000: Poetizando lo cotidiano (db)
