= Une autre histoire =

Single by Gérard Blanc

from the album Ailleurs pour un ailleurs
- B-side: "Dans quelle vie"
- Released: May 1987
- Genre: Pop
- Length: 4:30
- Label: EMI Music
- Songwriters: Marc Strawzynski; Gérard Blanc
- Producer: Jean-Jacques Souplet

Gérard Blanc singles chronology
"Une autre histoire" (1987)	"Du soleil dans la nuit" (1988)

"Une autre histoire" is a 1987 pop song recorded by French singer Gérard Blanc. It was the first single from his debut album Ailleurs pour un ailleurs and was released in May 1987. It became a smash hit in France in the summer and was covered by several artists throughout the years, thus achieving cult status. It can be deemed as the singer's signature song.

== Background ==
After being a member of Martin Circus band, Blanc tried to start a solo career as singer, in 1987. He released his first single, "Une autre histoire", written and composed by Marc Strawzynski and Blanc himself. A music video, shot by Michaël Schock in the Moroccan desert, shows Blanc's fiancée at the time, French host Annie Pujol. The song is included on Blanc's first album, Ailleurs pour un ailleurs, released in 1988. A maxi vinyl with remixes versions was produced for the discothèques, and an English version, titled "There Must Be a Woman", was also released in 1988.

== Chart performance ==
In France, "Une autre histoire" debuted at number 43 on the chart edition of 6 June 1987, climbed quickly and eventually reached number two for non consecutive two weeks, being blocked from the number one spot first by Madonna's "La Isla Bonita", then by Vanessa Paradis's "Joe le taxi". It totaled 15 weeks in the top 10 and 25 weeks on the chart (top 50). It earned a Gold disc awarded by the Syndicat National de l'Édition Phonographique. On the European Hot 100 Singles, it started at number 86 on 27 June 1987, reached a peak of number 28 in its eleven week, and fell off the chart after 23 weeks of presence.

== Awards ==
In 1987, "Une autre histoire" allaowed Blanc to win the Grand prix de la SACEM, who was also nominated at the Victoires de la Musique the same year, in the category Popular Music Male Révélation of the Year.

== Cover versions ==
In 2004, "Une autre histoire" was covered by Les Enfoirés on their album Les Enfoirés dans l'espace, also available on their compilation La compil' (vol. 3). Houcine and Aurélie Konaté, two contestants of the second edition of Star Academy France, covered the song in 2002 on the album Fait sa boum. In 2006, the contestants of French TV show Nouvelle Star made their own version of the song. In December 2012, Eve Angeli covered "Une autre histoire" and made a music video for the song.

== Track listings ==
- 7" single
1. "Une autre histoire" – 4:30
2. "Dans quelle vie" – 4:40
- 12" maxi
1. "Une autre histoire" (special remix club by Dimitri from Paris) – 8:52
2. "Une autre histoire" (special remix radio) – 4:27
- 12" maxi
1. "Une autre histoire" – 4:30
2. "Dans quelle vie" – 5:25

== Charts and certifications ==
=== Weekly charts ===
Chart (1987)	Peak position
Belgium (Ultratop 50 Wallonia)	14 (Note: The exact peak position in Wallonia is unknown. The single reached at least number 14, as Music & Media provided the single's ranking only for that week, but it did not reach the top three, given every week by the magazine.)
Europe (European Hot 100)	28
France (SNEP)	2
Quebec (ADISQ)	28

=== Year-end charts ===
Chart (1987)	Position
France (SNEP)	6

=== Certifications ===
Certifications for "Une autre histoire"
Region	Certification	Certified units/sales
France (SNEP)	Gold	500,000^{*}
^{*} Sales figures based on certification alone.
