= Bella Vita (David et Jonathan song) =

1987 single by David & Jonathan

Single by David et Jonathan

from the album Cœur de gosse
- B-side: "In My Heart"
- Released: 1987
- Recorded: 1986
- Studio: Studio CBE (recording)
- Genre: Pop, ballad
- Length: 4:10
- Label: Sefra
- Composer(s): David Marouani
- Lyricist(s): David Marouani, Olivier Lanquetin
- Producer(s): Pascal Auriat

David et Jonathan singles chronology
"Bella Vita" (1987)	"Gina" (1987)

"Bella Vita" is a 1986 pop-ballad song recorded by French vocal duet David et Jonathan. Written by Olivier Lanquetin and duet member David Marouani with a music composed by Marouani, it was their debut single from their 1988 album, Cœur de gosse, on which it appears as the fifth track, and was released in the first months of 1987. It achieved success in France, peaking at number two.

== Lyrics and music video ==
"Bella Vita" was written by Lanquetin and Marouani, the latter being only 15 years old at the time. The verses are alternately sung in Italian and English, while the refrain is only in Italian. The music video accompagning the song was shot in Saint-Paul-de-Vence, France.

== Critical reception ==
A review in Pan-European magazine Music & Media presented "Bella Vita" as "the duo's slow, saccharine pop ballad" and noted its huge success in France.

== Chart performance ==
In France, "Bella Vita" debuted at number 41 on the chart edition of 30 May 1987, entered the top ten in its fourth week where it remained for 15 weeks; it reached number two for non consecutive two weeks, being unable to dislodge first Madonna's "La Isla Bonita", then Vanessa Paradis's "Joe le taxi" which topped the chart then; it fell off the top 50 after 24 weeks of presence. It earned a Gold disc, awarded by the Syndicat National de l'Édition Phonographique. On the European Hot 100 Singles, it debuted at number 59 on 13 June 1987, reached a peak of number 20 for consecutive two weeks, and desappeared from the chart after 22 weeks of presence.

== Track listings ==
- 7" single - France, Benelux, Italy
1. "Bella Vita" — 4:10
2. "In My Heart" — 3:47
- 12" maxi - France
1. "Bella Vita" — 4:30
2. "In My Heart" — 3:47
- 7" single - Canada
1. "Bella Vita" — 4:25
2. "Prénoms bibliques" — 3:24

== Personnel ==
- Arrangement — Bernard Estardy
- Production — Pascal Auriat, Zone Music
- Photography — François Gaillard

== Charts ==
=== Weekly charts ===
Weekly chart performance for "Bella Vita"
Chart (1987)	Peak position
Belgium (Ultratop 50 Flanders)	31
Europe (European Hot 100)	20
France (SNEP)	2

=== Year-end charts ===
1987 year-end chart performance for "Bella Vita"
Chart (1987)	Position
Europe (Eurochart Hot 100)	46
France (SNEP)	7

== Certifications ==
Certifications for "Bella Vita"
Region	Certification	Certified units/sales
France (SNEP)	Gold	500,000^{*}
^{*} Sales figures based on certification alone.

== Release history ==
Country	Date	Format	Label
France	1986	7" single	Sefra
France	1986	12" single	Sefra
Benelux	1986	7" single	Ariola
Italy	1986	7" single	CGD
Canada	1986	7" single	Charles Talar
