= List of Oricon number-one singles of 1987 =

The highest-selling singles in Japan are ranked in the Oricon Singles Chart, which in 1987 was published in what was then called Oricon Weekly magazine. The data are compiled by Oricon based on each singles' physical sales. This list includes the singles that reached the number one place on that chart in 1987.

== Oricon Weekly Singles Chart ==
Issue date	Song	Artist(s)	Ref.
January 5	"Yakusoku"	Mamiko Takai	
January 12	"White Rabbit Kara no Message"	Marina Watanabe	
January 19	"Rakuen no Door"	Yoko Minamino	
January 26	"Too Adult"	Minayo Watanabe	
February 2	"No More Renai Gokko"	Onyanko Club	
February 9	"Yuki Gani"	Yoshi Ikuzō	
February 16	"Tango Noir"	Akina Nakamori	
February 23	"Tango Noir"	Akina Nakamori	
March 2	Kashiko	Ushiroyubi Sasaregumi	
March 9	"Mizu no Rogue"	Kyoko Koizumi	
March 16	"Stripe Blue"	Shonentai	
March 23	"Sapphire no Hitomi"	The Alfee	
March 30	"Kagerō"	Mamiko Takai	
April 6	"Idol wo Sagase"	Momoko Kikuchi	
April 13	"Hanashikake Takatta"	Yoko Minamino	
April 20	"Marina no Natsu"	Marina Watanabe	
April 27	"Pink no Chao"	Minayo Watanabe	
May 4	"Strawberry Time"	Seiko Matsuda	
May 11	"Strawberry Time"	Seiko Matsuda	
May 18	"Toki no Kawa wo Koete"	Ushirogami Hikaretai	
May 25	"Strawberry Time"	Seiko Matsuda	
June 1	"Katatsumuri Samba"	Onyanko Club	
June 8	"Mizu no Naka no Answer"	Kiyotaka Sugiyama	
June 15	"Blonde"	Akina Nakamori	
June 22	"Blonde"	Akina Nakamori	
June 29	"Sayonara no Kajitsutachi"	Yōko Oginome	
July 6	"Kimi Dake ni"	Shonentai	
July 13	"Pandora no Koibito"	Yoko Minamino	
July 20	"Wanderer"	Checkers	
July 27	"Natsuyasumi Dake no Sidesheet"	Marina Watanabe	
August 3	"Marionette"	Boøwy	
August 10	"Amaryllis"	Minayo Watanabe	
August 17	"Marionette"	Boøwy	
August 24	"Kita no Tabibito"	Yujiro Ishihara	
August 31	"Star Light"	Hikaru Genji	
September 7	"Shade"	Kiyotaka Sugiyama	
September 14	"Kindan no Telepathy"	Shizuka Kudo	
September 21	"Niji no Dreamer"	Yui Asaka	
September 28	"Naite Miryaii Jan"	Masahiko Kondō	
October 5	"Aki no Indication"	Yoko Minamino	
October 12	"Nanpasen"	Akina Nakamori	
October 19	"Catch Me"	Miho Nakayama	
October 26	"Remember"	Kazama San Shimai	
November 2	"Kiss wo Tomenai de"	Kyōko Koizumi	
November 9	"My Truth"	The Alfee	
November 16	"Pearl-White Eve"	Seiko Matsuda	
November 23	"ABC (Songs for Boys)"	Shonentai	
November 30	"Show Me"	Yukari Morikawa	
December 7	"Glass no Jūdai"	Hikaru Genji	
December 14	"Haikara san ga Toru"	Yoko Minamino	
December 21	"Glass no Jūdai"	Hikaru Genji	
December 28	"Glass no Jūdai"	Hikaru Genji	

== See also ==
- 1987 in Japanese music
