= One Way Home =

Studio album by the Hooters
- Released: July 1987
- Recorded: 1986–1987
- Studio: Record Plant, New York City; Studio 4, Philadelphia
- Genre: Rock
- Length: 42:45
- Label: Columbia
- Producer: Rick Chertoff; Eric Bazilian; Rob Hyman

The Hooters chronology
Nervous Night (1985)	One Way Home (1987)	Zig Zag (1989)

Singles from One Way Home
- 1. "Johnny B" Released: July 1987; 2. "Satellite" Released: September 1987; 3. "Karla with a K" Released: November 1987; 4. "Engine 999" Released: 1988 (Europe)

Professional ratings
Review scores
Source	Rating
AllMusic	3/5 stars
New Musical Express	3/10
Rolling Stone	4.5/5 stars

One Way Home is the third studio album by American rock band the Hooters, released in July 1987 by Columbia Records. The album peaked at #27 on the Billboard 200 chart on August 29, 1987.

== Background ==
After over two years of touring throughout the world, the Hooters picked up new instruments and ideas on their travels, creating an album that was a departure from their past work.

"Johnny B" and "Satellite" both charted at #61 on the Billboard Hot 100 when released as singles.

"Karla with a K" came about from simple jamming on the road through Louisiana. The song itself was inspired by an Irish street singer the band met in New Orleans. The song was released in the UK as a single and charted at #81.

Toward the middle of the song "One Way Home," a guitar riff from the Beatles' "Taxman" can be heard.

Two different earlier recordings of "Fightin' on the Same Side" were released on the band's 1981 debut single and on the band's 1983 debut label album Amore respectively.

The music for "Washington's Day" was written by Eric Bazilian and Rob Hyman when they were on tour, while producer Rick Chertoff and a longtime friend from Arista Records, Willie Nile, wrote the lyrics.

In late 1987, the Hooters experienced their first major commercial success in Europe. After heavy airplay in the United Kingdom, "Satellite" became a hit single, reaching No. 22, with the band performing on the popular British television show Top of the Pops on December 3, where they would meet one of their musical idols, Paul McCartney.

The picture for the album cover was taken on a farm on Long Island, New York.

== Track listing ==
All tracks are written by Rob Hyman, Eric Bazilian and Rick Chertoff, except where noted.

No.	Title	Writer(s)	Length
1.	"Satellite"		4:19
2.	"Karla with a K"	The Hooters	4:42
3.	"Johnny B"		4:01
4.	"Graveyard Waltz"		6:29
5.	"Fightin' on the Same Side"		4:09
6.	"One Way Home"	Hyman; Bazilian	5:56
7.	"Washington's Day"	Hyman; Bazilian; Chertoff; Willie Nile	5:52
8.	"Hard Rockin Summer"	Hyman; Bazilian	3:03
9.	"Engine 999"		4:11

== Personnel ==
The Hooters

- Eric Bazilian – lead vocals (tracks 1, 2, 6, 7, 8), guitars, bass (all tracks except 1, 6), mandolin, harmonica, saxophone
- Rob Hyman – lead vocals (tracks 3, 4, 5, 8, 9), keyboards, accordion
- Andy King – bass (tracks 1, 6), vocals
- John Lilley – guitar
- David Uosikkinen – drums

Technical

Adapted from the album liner notes.

- Rick Chertoff – producer
- Eric Bazilian – co-producer
- Rob Hyman – co-producer
- Dave Thoener – engineer, mixing
- Rod O'Brien – engineer
- Phil Nicolo – engineer
- Frank Pekoc – assistant engineer
- Joe Henehan – assistant engineer
- Teddy Trewhella – assistant engineer
- Rhonda Epstein – digital editing
- George Marino – mastering
- Janet Perr – art direction, design
- David Katzenstein – photography

== Charts ==
Chart (1987)	Peak position
Australia (Kent Music Report)	81
US Billboard 200	27

== Certifications ==
Certifications for One Way Home
Region	Certification	Certified units/sales
United States (RIAA)	Gold	500,000^{^}
^{^} Shipments figures based on certification alone.
