= David et Jonathan =

French musical duo

- Origin: France
- Genre: Pop music
- Years active: 1986-1990
- Label: Safra
- Members: David Marouani; Jonathan Bermudes

David et Jonathan was a 1980s vocal duet composed by David Marouani (born 1969) and Jonathan Bermudes (born 1968). The pair is best known for their hits, "Bella Vita", "Gina" and "Est-ce que tu viens pour les vacances ?" (English: “Are you coming for the holidays?"), which achieved huge success in France in 1987 and 1988 and earned Silver and Gold certifications. Several of their songs were written by Didier Barbelivien. When the band split up in 1990, both singers began their solo careers, which neither had done successfully.

== Discography ==
=== Albums ===
- 1988 : Cœur de gosse
- 1991 : David Marouani (David Marouani)

=== Singles ===
- 1986 : "Bella Vita" - #2 in France, Gold disc
- 1987 : "Gina" - #18 in France, Silver disc
- 1988 : "Est-ce que tu viens pour les vacances ?" - #3 in France, Gold disc
- 1988 : "Cœur de gosse" - #26 in France
- 1989 : "Pour toi Arménie" (charity single)
- 1989 : "Envie de pleurer" (David Marouani)
- 1989 : "Mes Nuits au soleil" (Jonathan Bermudes)
- 1991 : "Fais pas semblant" (David Marouani)
