= Gérard Blanc =

French singer and actor (1947–2009)

- Born: 8 December 1947
- Origin: France
- Died: 24 January 2009 (aged 61)
- Genres: Pop
- Occupations: Singer, guitarist, actor
- Years active: 1969–2009
- Website: www.gerardblanc.com

Gérard Blanc (8 December 1947 – 24 January 2009) was a French singer, guitarist and actor.

== Life and career ==
He began to sing in the 1970s with the band Martin Circus. Then in the 1980s, he participated in the production of Princess Stephanie of Monaco's first album, and started a solo career. He charted four singles in France, including "Du soleil dans la nuit" (#10) and particularly the summer hit "Une Autre Histoire" (#2 in 1987). He went on stage at the Olympia on 20 March 2008.

== Solo discography ==
=== Albums ===
- 1988: Ailleurs pour un ailleurs
- 1991: Noir et Blanc
- 1995: À cette seconde-là !
- 1999: Tout blanc
- 2003: Mes Plus Belles Histoires
- 2008: Les Plus Grands Succès de Gérard Blanc & Martin Circus
- 2009: Made in Paris

=== Singles ===
Year	Single	Peak chart positions	
Year	Single	FR	QUE
1987	"Une autre histoire"	2	28
1988	"Du soleil dans la nuit"	10	—
1988	"Sentiment d'océan"	35	33
1989	"Tonton bâton"	47	—
1989	"Lance un cri"	—	8
1989	"Dans quelle vie"	—	31
1989	"Dis tout bas, dis"	—	5
1990	"Je saurai que c'est toi"	—	34
1990	"Après la musique"	—	22
1991	"Plus le temps"	—	2
1991	"Un jour avant toi"	—	15
1995	"À quoi ça rime"	—	—
1995	"Bout d'chou"	—	—
1997	"Si tu m'aimes à cette seconde là"	—	—
2003	"L'amour parle plus fort que les mots" (promo release)	—	—
2006	"Pour la faire rêver" (promo release)	—	—
"—" denotes releases that did not chart or were not released

== Filmography ==
- Thierry la Fronde (as Renaud)
- 1967: Le Naufrage de Robinet
- 1971: Les bidasses en folie
- 1979: Les Bidasses en vadrouille (as Gérard)
- 1997: Nettoyage à sec (as Bertrand)
