= Music censorship =

Editing musical works for various reasons

Music censorship refers to the practice of editing musical works for various reasons, stemming from a wide variety of motivations, including moral, political, or religious reasons. Censorship can range from the complete government-enforced legal prohibition of a musical work, to private, voluntary removal of content when a musical work appears in a certain context.

== Motivations ==
=== Decency ===
Songs are often edited for broadcast on radio and television to remove content that may be considered objectionable to an outlet's target audience—such as profanity, or references to subjects such as sex and drug usage. This is typically done to comply with any relevant broadcast law or codes of conduct, and to make the songs more marketable to a mainstream audience. Songs edited for content in this manner by are often referred to as a "clean version" or a radio edit (the latter also refers to songs that had been edited for length on radio airplay—a practice which dates back to the space limitations of 45 RPM vinyl singles). Common ways to edit songs are to remove offensive words, such as muting, bleeping, and backmasking, or replacing them with alternative lyrics.

The amount of censorship required may vary between broadcasters, depending on standards and practices and their target audience; for example, Radio Disney imposed stricter content guidelines than conventional U.S. radio stations, as it primarily targeted a youth audience and family listening. By contrast, some radio stations may relegate unedited versions of tracks containing objectionable content to airplay during time periods deemed appropriate, such as late-night hours. Joel Mullis, an Atlanta sound engineer who became well known in the industry for his work on radio edits, noted that his job was often complicated by differing standards between broadcasters (such as BET and MTV), requiring different edits to meet their individual needs. Mullis' edit of the Ying Yang Twins' "Wait (The Whisper Song)" was constructed by splicing in vocals from other Ying Yang Twins songs, but Mullis eventually had to bring the group back to his studio after facing demands for additional edits.

In some cases, a record label may choose to withhold a release entirely if they believe that its subject matter would be too controversial; Ice-T and Paris both had gangsta rap albums withheld or indefinitely delayed by Warner Records over content concerns, with Ice-T's Home Invasion delayed due to the 1992 Los Angeles riots and controversy over "Cop Killer"—a song by Ice-T's metal band Body Count, and Paris's Sleeping with the Enemy over its songs "Bush Killa" and "Coffee, Doughnuts, & Death". Insane Clown Posse faced similar issues after they signed to Disney-owned Hollywood Records; despite compliance with the label's demands to censor specific songs and lyrics, The Great Milenko was recalled almost immediately after its release (but not before selling 18,000 copies out of 100,000 shipped). All three acts moved to different labels (including Priority Records and Island Records), which released their respective albums without objections.

The ideas that make up censorship differ greatly from country to country. However, even if no pattern can be observed, it is normally set about through power. Censorship as a whole terminates unwanted messages in hopes of keeping the targeted listener's vision and actions in check. It is known for being dependent on three different conditions. The first being that the censored body or subject is not authorized. The second being that censorship takes place to avert the object of what is restricted. Finally, it is put in place to deny existence of the censored issues.

The motivation behind music censorship is associated to the circulation of popular music through numerous mediums. Reasons for why music may be censored include that music is deemed contentious, aggressive or disrespectful. Music censorship therefore aims to minimize the exposure to controversial topics such as sex, drugs and the challenging of social norms. Constituting to restrictions to one's freedom of speech with the goal of shielding society from detrimental expression.

Music censorship was impacted by the religious influences on governments before the modern nation-state. The Catholic Church's Index Librorum Prohibitum is an early sign of censorship, later translating into the music censorship of the 21st century.

==== Notable examples ====
Multiple edits of CeeLo Green's song "Fuck You" exist, including one which changed the refrain to "Forget You", and one which muted "fuck" without replacing it. Green also performed a parody of the song about Fox News and its controversies in an appearance on The Colbert Report. The Black Eyed Peas re-wrote "Let's Get Retarded"—a song from their album Elephunk, as "Let's Get It Started" to serve as a promotional song for television coverage of the 2004 NBA playoffs. "Let's Get It Started" was subsequently released as a standalone single, and peaked at #21 on the Billboard Hot 100. When performing his song "Power" on Saturday Night Live, Kanye West similarly replaced a verse of the song containing profanities and criticism of the program itself ("Fuck SNL and the whole cast") with newly written lyrics.

Songs containing potentially objectionable double entendres or mondegreens have also been subject to censorship. For example, the title and chorus of Britney Spears' single "If U Seek Amy" was intended to be misheard as "F-U-C-K me"; her label issued a radio edit which changed the word "seek" to "see", in order to remove the wordplay. Similar concerns were raised by radio stations over The Black Eyed Peas' "Don't Phunk with My Heart" upon its release, as the word "phunk" (a deliberate misspelling of "funk") could be misinterpreted by listeners as sounding like the word "fuck". This resulted in the label issuing an edit that changed the word to "mess". Meghan Trainor recorded an alternate version of her debut single "All About That Bass" for Radio Disney and conservative adult contemporary music stations, which removed the song's suggestive metaphors.

Censorship of music is not limited to lyrical content; MTV edited the M.I.A. song "Paper Planes" to replace sounds of gunfire in its chorus with alternative sound effects, and remove a reference to cannabis. Similar sound edits occurred when M.I.A. performed the same song on Late Show with David Letterman (broadcast by corporate sibling CBS). M.I.A. subsequently criticized both MTV and Late Show for censoring her song.

==== Criticism ====
Some listeners have expressed dissatisfaction over the editing of songs for radio airplay, arguing that it compromises the artistic integrity of the original song, and encourage listeners to seek out alternative platforms that are not subject to such censorship, such as digital streaming. At the same time, edits are considered a necessary concession to receive the radio airplay that can influence a song's overall performance. N.W.A's debut album Straight Outta Compton (which had attracted controversy for its song "Fuck tha Police") includes the song "Express Yourself", which criticizes the censorship of music by radio stations, and hip-hop musicians who write inoffensive songs to target mainstream radio airplay. "Express Yourself" is the only song on the album to not contain profanities.

=== Sensitivity ===
Some songs may be pulled or downplayed by broadcasters if they are considered to be inappropriate to play in the aftermath of specific events. After the September 11 attacks, program directors of the radio conglomerate Clear Channel compiled an internal list of "lyrically questionable" songs, which included various songs with themes related to war, death, destruction, flight, or New York City, and all songs by Rage Against the Machine. Slate noted several unusual choices on the list, including "Walk Like an Egyptian", two Cat Stevens songs (Stevens had converted to the Islamic faith and changed his name to Yusuf Islam. He had personally condemned the attacks, and announced that he would donate a portion of the royalties from his compilations to a fund benefitting the families of victims), and John Lennon's "explicitly pacifist anthem 'Imagine'".

In the aftermath of the Space Shuttle Columbia disaster in February 2003, Mark Wills' "19 Somethin'" was temporarily pulled by some radio stations as it contains a lyric referencing the Challenger disaster. Also that month, Madonna's then-upcoming music video for "American Life" generated controversy due to its politicized and "unpatriotic" imagery in the wake of the U.S.-led invasion of Iraq, such as a fashion show featuring women dressed in military gear, and a scene where the singer throws a grenade-shaped lighter to a George W. Bush lookalike to light his cigar. Due to the negative response, Madonna pulled the video in April 2003 prior to its planned premiere, as she did not want to "risk offending anyone who might misinterpret the meaning of this video". It was replaced by an alternate video, featuring Madonna singing the song in front of various national flags. To mark the 20th anniversary of the American Life album, the original video was officially released for the first time in April 2023.

In 2006, after Gary Glitter was convicted of child sexual abuse in Vietnam, the National Football League banned the original recording of his song "Rock and Roll" (which was popularly played at U.S. sporting events) from being played at its games. While the NFL still allowed a cover version of the song to be played, in 2012, the league instructed its teams to "avoid" playing the song entirely, following negative reception from British media over its continued use by the New England Patriots, and the possibility it could be played during Super Bowl XLVI.

In 2009, after Chris Brown pleaded guilty to a felony assault of his then-girlfriend singer, Rihanna, various radio stations began to voluntarily pull Brown's music from their playlists as a condemnation of his actions. In December 2013, after Lostprophets' lead singer Ian Watkins was convicted of 13 sexual offences against children, the band's releases were pulled by music retailer HMV, while BBC Radio banned all of its songs from airplay. The group would also disband, with its remaining members forming a new band named No Devotion with Thursday frontman Geoff Rickly.

In late-2018, Cleveland radio station WDOK pulled "Baby, It's Cold Outside"—a 1944 pop standard synonymous with the Christmas season—from its Christmas music playlist, citing that certain interpretations of the song's subject matter were too sensitive in the wake of the #MeToo movement against sexual harassment and assault. The move prompted other broadcasters (including two of Canada's major commercial radio groups, and the state-run CBC Radio) to follow suit. The decision was divisive among critics and the general public, with supporters arguing that the song's possible implications of date rape did not align with current societal norms, and others arguing that the decision was an appeal to political correctness. The CBC later reversed its decision, while a poll conducted by San Francisco radio station KOIT had only 23% of participants objecting to the song.

In March 2019, some radio stations (particularly those of Cogeco in the Canadian province of Quebec, and Radio New Zealand), began to pull the music of Michael Jackson from rotation in response to the Channel 4/HBO documentary Leaving Neverland, which featured allegations by Wade Robson and Jimmy Safechuck that Jackson had sexually abused them as children. Cumulus Media stated that it had allowed its stations to make decisions on this matter on a case-by-case basis. In late 2019, a number of New Zealand and Canadian radio stations reversed pulling Jackson's music from their playlists, stating "positive listener survey results"

=== Legal issues ===
Songs and albums may, in some cases, be censored due to copyright problems (particularly related to sampling) or other legal issues. The JAMs album 1987 (What the Fuck Is Going On?) was withdrawn from distribution following complaints by ABBA, whose music was sampled on the album without permission. The Notorious B.I.G.'s album Ready to Die was similarly pulled following a lawsuit by Bridgeport Music over unauthorized samples.

By request of Atlantic Records, parody musician "Weird Al" Yankovic did not commercially release "You're Pitiful"—his parody of James Blunt's song "You're Beautiful", even though Blunt himself had approved of the satire. It was subsequently released as a free single online instead.

== By country ==
=== Afghanistan ===
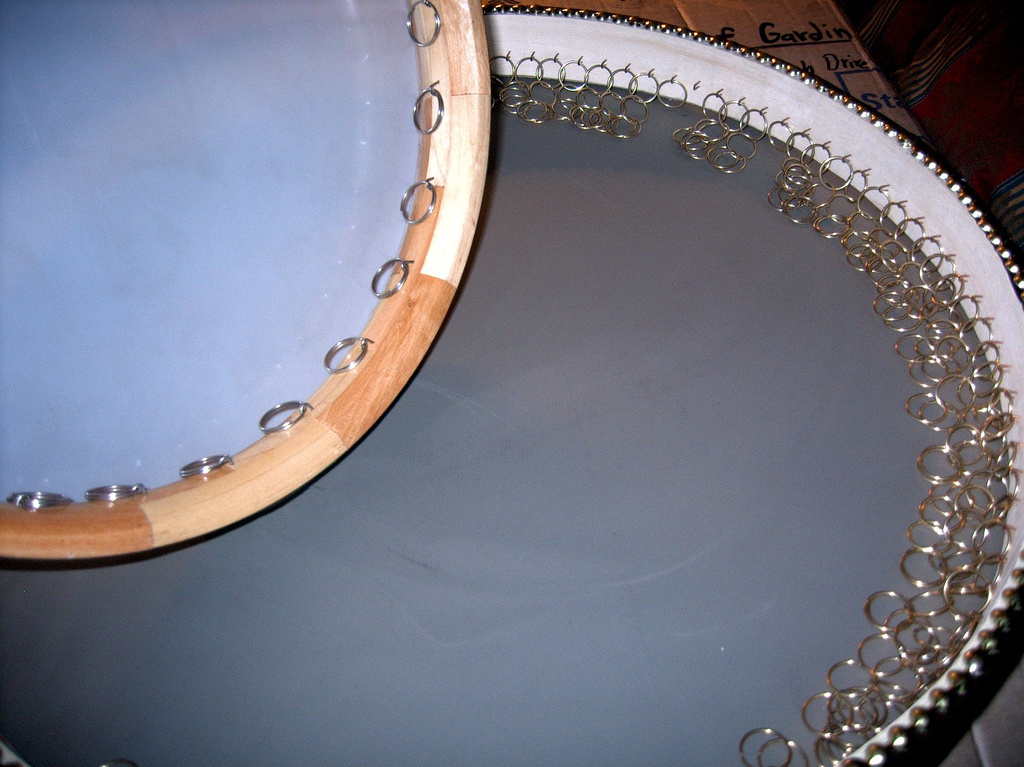
A pair of Dairehs

During the initial five-year reign of the Taliban government in Afghanistan between 1996 and 2001, all Western technology and art, including music, was prohibited. Instruments were demolished, celebrations were banned and all that was played on the radio were chants glorifying the Taliban. The one and only instrument to be exempt from this ban was the frame drum, also known as the Daireh or Daf. While briefly lifted during the twenty-year tenure of the Islamic Republic, the ban was resumed upon the return of Taliban rule in 2021.

=== Australia ===
The Australian Recording Industry Association (ARIA) and the Australian Music Retailers Association (AMRA) maintain a self-regulatory system known as the "Recorded Music Labelling Code of Practice", which utilizes a three-tier ratings system for objectionable content in music recordings. "Level 1" applies to content of a "moderate impact" (including "infrequent aggressive or strong coarse language; or moderate-impact references to drug use, violence, sexual activity or themes"), "Level 2" for "strong impact" ("frequent aggressive or strong coarse language", or strong references to drug use, violence, sexual activity or themes), and "Level 3" for "high impact" content (graphic and high-impact references to drug use, violence, sexual activity or themes). The Level 3 classification was introduced in March 2003, and requires purchasers to be over the age of 18. The code bans the distribution or sale of any recording with material that exceeds Level 3 classification, which includes content "which promote, incite, instruct or exploitatively or gratuitously depict drug abuse, cruelty, suicide, criminal or sexual violence, child abuse, incest, bestiality or any other revolting or abhorrent activity in a way that causes outrage or extreme disgust."

Australian consumer law also bans the import of any product that "describe[s], depict[s], express[es] or otherwise deal[s] with matters of sex, drug misuse or addiction, crime, cruelty, violence or revolting or abhorrent phenomena in such a way that they offend against the standards of morality, decency and propriety generally accepted by reasonable adults". In 2003, copies of an album by grindcore band Intense Hammer Rage were seized by the Australian Customs Service, and the three band members were each fined AUD$500 each for violating customs law. The violations centred upon the abhorrent subject matter of the album's artwork and printed lyrics; the albums had been manufactured in the United States by their record label, and imported into Australia for their distribution. The band criticized the seizure as being a dilution of freedom of speech.

In May 1990, Nick Franklin, acting news director of the Australian Broadcasting Corporation's radio station Triple J, was suspended by the ABC's management after having played a portion of N.W.A's song "Fuck tha Police" during a segment in which he discussed the song's vulgar lyrics and subject matter. The song had received airplay on the station for several months, but ABC Radio head Malcom Long requested that the song be given a "rest". In protest of the suspension, Triple J staff engaged in an industrial action, and the station played the N.W.A. song "Express Yourself" 82 times in a row before the ABC reinstated Franklin. In 2014, Triple J would pay homage to the event while launching its digital radio station Double J, playing various cover versions of the song on a loop as a stunt prior to its official launch.

=== Austria ===
Austrian rapper Mr. Bond was arrested in January 2021 on the charges of "producing and broadcasting Nazi ideas" and "incitement to hatred". He was later sentenced to ten years' imprisonment.

=== Brazil ===
During the military dictatorship that ruled from 1964 to 1985, Institutional Act Number Five (AI-5) granted the authority to censor cultural works that were seen as subversive to moral or political values. It was estimated that at least 500 song lyrics were censored under AI-5. The present-day Constitution of Brazil adopted in 1988 prohibits the censorship of "political, ideological and artistic natures".

The genre of funk carioca has faced attention due to its often-provocative subject matter. One subgenre known as "Proibidão" (lit. "strongly prohibited"), which originated from the favelas of Rio de Janeiro, is promoted at parties organized by drug cartels, and often contain lyrics that glorify the cartel and diss their competitors. Funk carioca parties (baile funk) have been associated with criminal activities such as violence and drug trafficking. A bill proposing a ban of funk carioca was rejected by the Federal Senate of Brazil.

=== Cambodia ===
During the dictatorship of the Khmer Rouge (1975 to 1979), all music in Cambodia was banned – the only exception being anything to do with party propaganda. Instruments and records were systematically destroyed by the regime, and as many as 90 percent of musicians and dancers were killed.

=== Canada ===
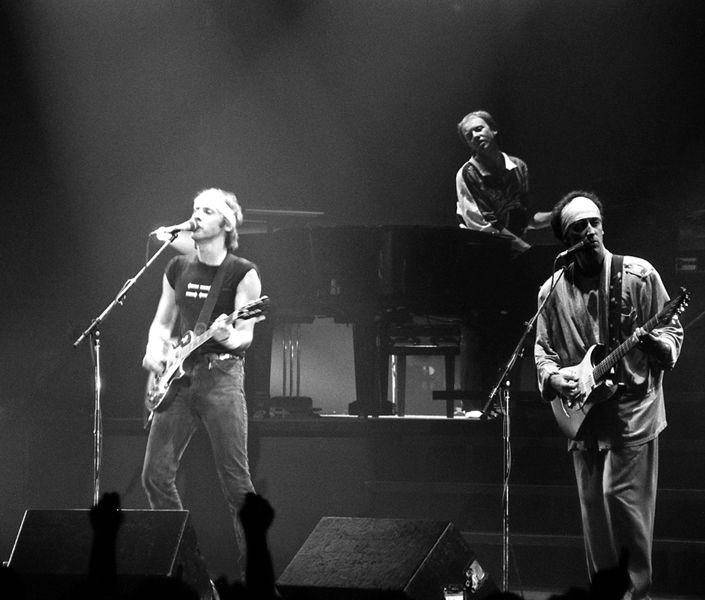
The Dire Straits song "Money for Nothing" was the subject of a ruling by broadcast self-regulators in Canada.

In Canada, content broadcast by commercial radio and television stations is self-regulated by the Canadian Broadcast Standards Council (CBSC) under the code of the Canadian Association of Broadcasters (CAB). The CBSC acts upon complaints that are submitted by the general public. The CAB Code prohibits radio broadcast of undue coarse language or sexually explicit material, nor content which glorifies violence. The Canadian Radio-television and Telecommunications Commission (CRTC) can intervene in more substantial cases.

In 2011, the Atlantic panel of the CBSC, in response to a complaint against CHOZ-FM, ruled that a version of Dire Straits' 1985 single "Money for Nothing" containing the homophobic slur "faggot" violated the ethics code. The CRTC called upon the CBSC to review the decision with a national panel, as it "elicited a strong public reaction and created uncertainty for private radio stations across the country." In particular, the CRTC asked the CBSC to consider the overall context of the slur in relation to the rest of the song, as well as how the word was used at the time of the song's release. The CBSC overturned the ruling; while panellists agreed that the slur was inappropriate, it was considered to be satirical and non-hateful in context. It was also noted that lead singer Mark Knopfler had substituted the word himself with alternatives (such as "queenie") during live performances, which was considered an admission that his original choice in words was in bad taste. The CBSC stated that it was up to individual stations whether or not they would play the unedited version.

The ruling and controversy were ridiculed by critics; veteran Canadian radio personality Alan Cross commented that the controversy made Canada look "silly", remarking that "I talked to people from the U.S. and the U.K. and they were like, 'What's wrong with you people? Don't you get it? It's a joke. It's a satire. You didn't understand the context?'" National Post columnist Chris Selley described the CBSC's new ruling as a "comedy classic" and "colossal waste of time", explaining that "it's one thing for a censor to decide whether something is legitimately artistic; it's another for it to declare whether or not it enjoys the art, as if it somehow mattered."

=== China ===
During the rule of Mao Zedong, "Yellow Music" became subject to criticism and censure, since the Chinese Communist Party saw Shanghai shidaiqu pop music as indecent, and critics saw the sentiments of love songs as appealing only to the petite bourgeoisie. The genre was also criticized over its connections to American jazz music, due to anti-Americanism from the Korean War. This resulted in many artists associated with shidaiqu, including Li Jinhui (who had been credited as a leading figure in the genre) and Chen Gexin, being branded as "rightists" and persecuted. Shanghai pop was displaced by revolutionary music that promoted Maoism and other ideologies of the Communist Party. Many Shanghai artists fled to Hong Kong, where the genre reached its height in the 1950s until the late 1960s, when it was superseded by Taiwanese pop (Mandarin adaptations of Japanese enka songs), and later by Cantopop. In 1966, Tian Han—writer of the Chinese national anthem "March of the Volunteers"—was imprisoned over his allegorical play Xie Yaohuan (which was critical of Mao's regime) in one of the opening salvos of the Cultural Revolution. His works were banned, leading to "The East Is Red"—a song which glorified Mao's cult of personality, being used as the de facto national anthem at this time. The Chinese Musicians' Association, developed in July 1949, was established to recruit and train socialist musicians to strengthen the socialist ideology in the new generation.

In contemporary times, musical works that criticize, or could be interpreted as criticism of the Chinese government, have also been subject to censure. Guns N' Roses' album Chinese Democracy was banned in the country, as its title track criticizes the Chinese government and contains references to the Falun Gong (a spiritual movement which is subject to persecution in China). The song "Legacy" on Pet Shop Boys' 2009 album Yes was changed to an instrumental for its Chinese release, as it contains the lyric "governments fall". In July 2017, it was reported that Justin Bieber had been banned from performing in the country, citing "a series of bad behaviours, both in his social life and during a previous performance in China, which caused discontent among the public." In addition to criticism of the government, there is also censorship for drug use, over sexualising and misogynistic content. Chinese artists, such as PG One, have faced scrutiny from various institutions for having lyrics that contain misogyny and drug-related activities, seen as promoting what the Chinese government sees as inappropriate behaviour.

China has historically condemned or banned any musician who publicly supports Tibetan independence or otherwise interacts with the Dalai Lama; in 2008, Björk chanted "Tibet, Tibet" to the audience whilst performing "Declare Independence" during a concert in Shanghai. Zhou Heping stated that the song, which was not cleared by Chinese authorities, had caused "dissatisfaction among the broader Chinese audience". He described Björk's case as an isolated incident, and denied that the Ministry of Culture was wanting to further restrict performances by Western acts in the country in response to the incident, since China wanted international musicians to perform there for the Summer Olympics. In 2013, German electronic music band Kraftwerk were denied entry visas over their intent to perform at a 1999 Free Tibet concert in Washington, D.C., which was cancelled due to inclement weather. Maroon 5 had concerts cancelled in the country after bandmember Jesse Carmichael posted a Twitter message for the Dalai Lama's 80th birthday, and Oasis concerts in China were cancelled after lead singer Noel Gallagher performed at a Free Tibet concert in New York City. In 2016, the Publicity Department banned Lady Gaga after she posted a video of her meeting with the Dalai Lama prior to a conference in Indianapolis.

In July 2016, a voluntary boycott of South Korean music and entertainment was practiced after the U.S. and South Korea announced the deployment of a THAAD missile defence system to protect against attacks by North Korea (which has diplomatic ties with China). K-pop groups, as well as soprano Sumi Jo, had performances cancelled in the country due to the boycott. Share prices of SM Entertainment and YG Entertainment also fell, as South Korean entertainment companies had increasingly invested in China to take advantage of the Korean Wave. In November 2017, following the settlement of the THAAD dispute, Chinese media outlets began to ease their censure of Korean music.

"Do You Hear the People Sing?" from Les Misérables was removed from Chinese music streaming services in the wake of the 2019–2020 Hong Kong protests, as the song has been considered a protest song in Hong Kong. Another protest song associated with the movement, "Glory to Hong Kong", was banned under the Hong Kong national security law in 2023; the ban was upheld by appeal in May 2024.

=== Iran ===
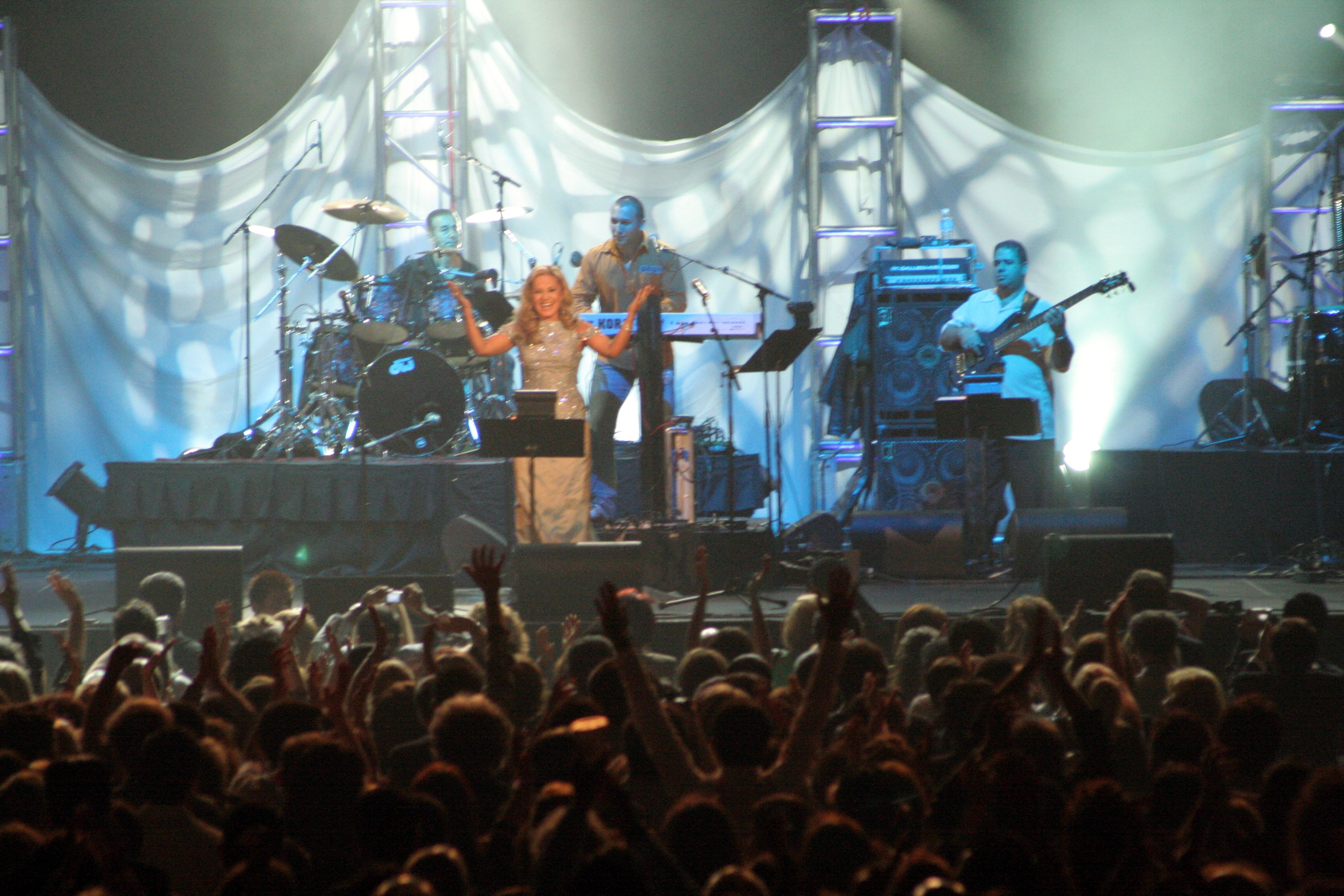
Iranian singer Googoosh performing at Scotiabank Centre in Toronto, Canada

In July 1979, during the wake of the Iranian revolution, supreme leader Ruhollah Khomeini banned all popular music, considering it corrupting to youth's minds. The ban prompted many Iranian musicians to move to the U.S. city of Los Angeles to pursue their careers and industry there instead. Female vocalists such as Googoosh were also targeted under the ban (although her works remained popular via the black market), and she subsequently refused to perform. The restrictions were relaxed in the years that followed, especially under reformist president Mohammad Khatami in the 1990s. Khatami also lifted bans on male pop groups (so they could perform in concerts marking the 20th anniversary of the Revolution), and began to authorize performances by female singers internationally, and to all-female audiences inside the country. In 2000, Googoosh was given authorization to embark on an international comeback tour.

In 2005, president Mahmoud Ahmadinejad enacted a ban on western music from state-run broadcasters. The move came shortly after conductor Alexander Rahbari had resigned from the Tehran Symphony Orchestra due to backlash over their performance of Beethoven's Symphony No. 9 (the first time it had been performed in Iran since the Revolution).

All music must be approved by the Ministry of Culture and Islamic Guidance; typically, authorized releases are limited to traditional Iranian folk, classical, and pop music. As some have faced government action for writing, producing, and performing unapproved music, many Iranian musicians do so as emigrants outside of the country. However, there have been thriving underground scenes in genres such as hip-hop and rock.

=== Israel ===
The German composers Richard Strauss and Richard Wagner have been considered controversial figures in Israel due to their associations with Nazi Germany, in addition to Wagner's displays of antisemitism towards the Jewish faith. Although the works of Strauss have since been performed in the country, and broadcasters have played the works of Wagner without controversy, there has historically been resistance to live performances of Wagner's music in Israel—with concerts intending to do so having been met with protests.

=== Malaysia ===
In Malaysia, a Muslim-majority country, local law prohibits radio stations from playing songs that are "offensive to public feeling" or "violate good taste and decency". References to LGBTQ topics were censored from Lady Gaga's "Born This Way" by local radio stations because homosexual acts are illegal in the country, while "Despacito" was pulled by Malaysia's state-owned radio stations following listener concerns over its "un-Islamic" lyrics.

Concerts in Malaysia have also been subject to censorship to comply with the country's moral values; Avril Lavigne was instructed to not wear revealing clothing, jump, shout, or include any "negative elements" in a 2008 concert in Kuala Lumpur, Muslim citizens were initially banned from attending a Black Eyed Peas concert in 2009 due to its Guinness sponsorship, as alcohol is banned under Sharia law (the ban was lifted after Guinness agreed to cease advertising its involvement nor sell its products at the event), and Adam Lambert agreed to make changes to a 2010 concert due to concerns that he would promote "gay culture".

=== Myanmar ===
In 1962, General Ne Win banned all Western music and dancing to preserve the culture of what was once known as Burma. The emergence of rock music posed challenges for the Western music ban, as the new genre promoted the rejection of discipline and encouraged cultural freedom.

=== North Korea ===
Music of North Korea is typically limited to state-sanctioned performers and ensembles, whose propaganda music glorifies the Kim dynasty and Juche ideology. Foreign music, and older North Korean music that do not meet the government's standards, is generally banned.

Under Supreme Leader Kim Jong Un, Western music has been selectively exhibited by the country, such as by the all-female Moranbong Band during their inaugural concert in 2012, and a concert by Slovenian band Laibach in July 2015 featuring covers of traditional songs and selections from The Sound of Music (the latter being described as the first ever rock concert in the country).

In July 2015, it was reported that Kim Jong-un had issued a directive calling for inspectors to destroy music CDs and cassettes containing prohibited content, as well as adding additional songs to the blacklist (such as the entire soundtrack of the historical drama Im Kkeok Jeong).

=== Poland ===
In May 2020, Polish radio station Trójka—run by state radio broadcaster Polskie Radio—was accused of censoring "Twój ból jest lepszy niż mój" ("Your Pain is Better Than Mine"), a song by Kazik Staszewski that was critical of the ruling Law and Justice party. The song was inspired by a controversy involving party leader Jarosław Kaczyński, who had visited the graves of his mother and twin-brother Lech Kaczyński at a Warsaw cemetery, even though they were closed to the public due to COVID-19 pandemic restrictions. The song does not reference the party or Kaczyński by name.

When "Twój ból jest lepszy niż mój" charted at number one on Trójka's weekly countdown on 15 May, the station subsequently suppressed the chart and all references to the song from its website. Station director Tomasz Kowalczewski accused the programme's host Marek Niedźwiecki of having rigged the chart in favour of Kazik's song. Bartosz Gil — who also works on the chart show — alleged that Kaczyński's claim was false, and accused him of specifically targeting the song. The following Sunday, Niedźwiecki announced his immediate resignation from the station, and also threatened legal action against the broadcaster for false claims of fraud. On 16 May, Polskie Radio music head Piotr Metz revealed that, after the chart show aired, Kowalczewski had ordered him via text message to remove "Twój ból jest lepszy niż mój" from the station's music library. Metz resigned from the station. The station also faced threats of boycotts from members of the Polish music industry. Deputy Prime Minister Jadwiga Emilewicz argued that "artistic freedom should never be fettered in any way, even when the artist has a different opinion".

=== South Africa ===
The SABC developed a record libraries, where all record companies were forced to submit their records to have their lyrics reviewed. Records that had banned lyrics, including those that influenced public opinion, were destroyed. In 1980, the SABC banned Pink Floyd's "Another Brick in the Wall," as it contained the lyrics "we don't want your education," which were seen as influencing public opinion. The SABC also banned "Cry Freedom" written by George Fenton and Jonas Gwanwa due to its association with Nelson Mandela, and Roger Lucey's "Lungile Tabalaza" and "You Only Need Say Nothing."

In 1985, a group known as Artists United Against Apartheid released Sun City, an album protesting the apartheid in South Africa. Its title track references Sun City—a luxury resort in the bantustan of Bophuthatswana that frequently hosted concerts by major musicians. The song encouraged other artists not to perform at Sun City during the apartheid, calling for justice.

=== South Korea ===
Due to tense relations between Japan and South Korea following the end of Japanese rule, the Korean government imposed various restrictions (ostensibly meant to target Japan) on the importation of cultural works from other countries. In September 1999, South Korea lifted its ban on live performances of Japanese music, but only in venues with a capacity smaller than 2000. In June 2000, it became legal to perform Japanese music in larger venues, and to sell music recordings originating from Japan. However, until January 2004, it remained illegal to sell recordings containing Japanese-language lyrics. It remains illegal to broadcast Japanese music over terrestrial radio and television in South Korea.

To appeal to the country's conservatism, television broadcasters have sometimes pulled music videos from airplay for containing content they deem to be inappropriate, such as violent or sexually suggestive content. While Korea's three largest television networks—KBS, MBC, and SBS—have all banned videos at some point, the public broadcaster KBS is known for having stricter standards and practices, and additionally bans songs that encourage inappropriate behaviour (especially among youth), or contain references to brand names or Japanese words. This results in some songs, such as Psy's "Gentleman" (which was banned by KBS for a scene in which the singer kicks over a traffic cone) being banned only by KBS, but still receiving airplay by other networks.

In 2010, the Supreme Court of South Korea ruled that it was illegal under the National Security Act to possess music that praises North Korea, even if instrumental, as it constitutes an "enemy-benefiting expression".

=== Ukraine ===
In June 2022, after the Russian invasion of Ukraine which was started on February 24, 2022, the Parliament of Ukraine voted to ban the distribution of Russian books and the playing or performance of Russian music by post-Soviet-era artists who support Russian aggression against Ukraine. This ban does not apply to artists included in the list of musical performers who condemn the war against Ukraine.

=== United Kingdom ===
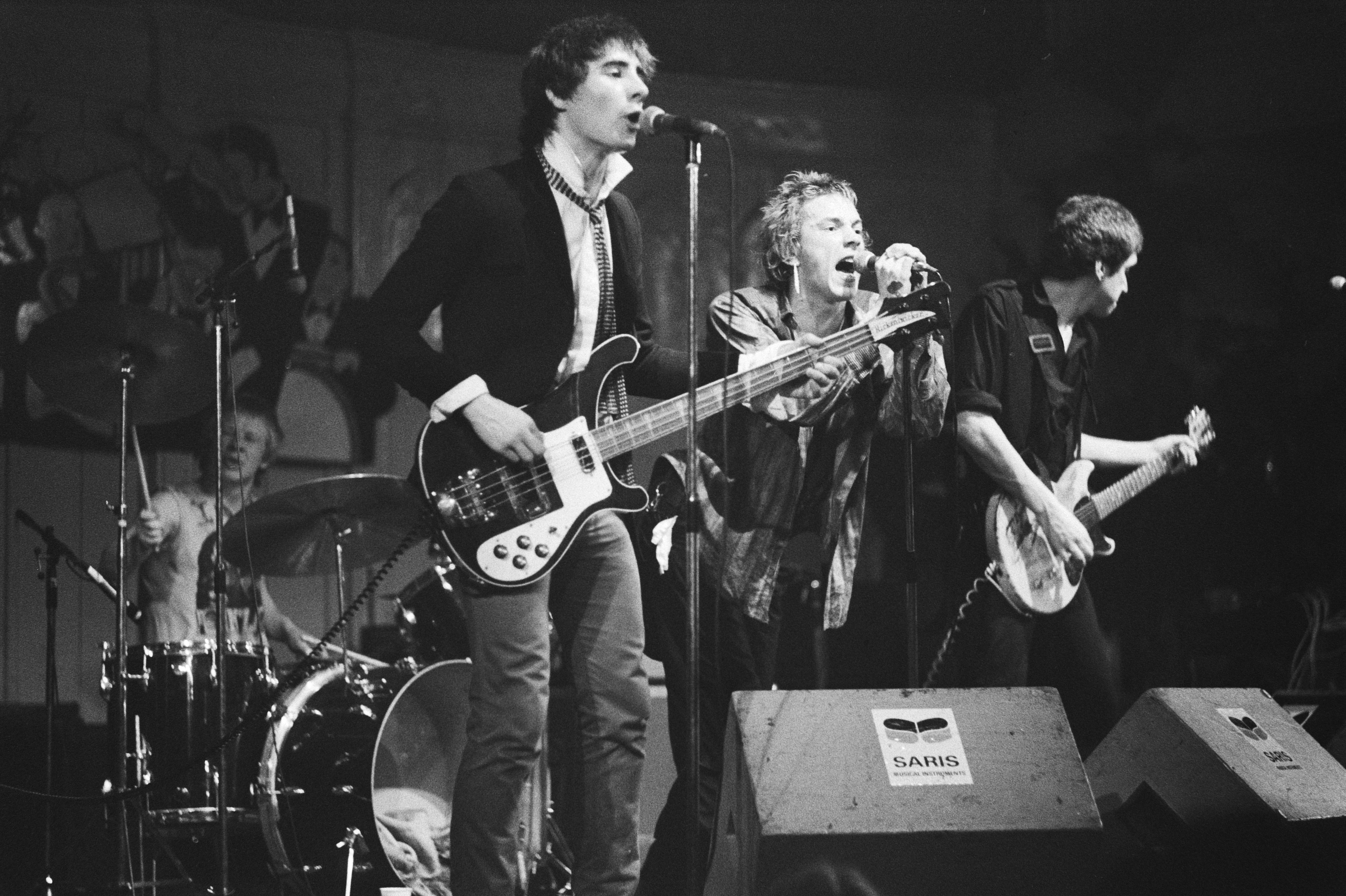
The Sex Pistols' "God Save the Queen" was banned by radio stations, and allegedly suppressed from being the number-one song in the UK, due to its criticism of the British government and monarchy.

The telecommunications regulator Ofcom has the power to reprimand broadcasters for playing songs and music videos that breach its guidelines on harmful or offensive content pre-watershed. The British Phonographic Industry (BPI) adopted the Recording Industry Association of America (RIAA) Parental Advisory label program; in July 2011, the BPI published guidance for use of the logo on digital streaming platforms.

The BBC was historically known for censoring various songs from being played on its radio and television stations; from the 1930s through the 1960s, the BBC had banned songs such as "Hold My Hand" for its religious references, pop arrangements of classical tunes (though barring "Sabre Dance" because it was "not a well-loved classic whose perversion we would be encouraging"), and during World War II, songs that were "slushy in sentiment", such as "I'll Be Home for Christmas", due to concerns that it would affect the morale of soldiers. "Mack the Knife" was also banned from airplay outside of The Threepenny Opera, as the BBC felt it would be offensive outside of the context of the play. The Kinks' "Lola" was briefly banned under BBC rules prohibiting product placement, as its lyrics contain references to the brand name Coca-Cola. In the midst of an American tour, lead singer Ray Davies flew back to London to re-record the offending lyric as "cherry cola".

The Sex Pistols' 1977 single "God Save the Queen" was controversial upon its release, as it was critical of the British government and monarchy (among other things, referring to the United Kingdom as a "fascist regime"), and was released during the year of Elizabeth II's silver jubilee. "God Save the Queen" was banned by the BBC and all Independent Local Radio stations, but still peaked at #2 on the UK singles chart during the week of the official Jubilee celebration. It was alleged that the chart's rules were changed for that week only to exclude sales from record shops that sold their own records (in this case, Virgin), in a deliberate effort to prevent the controversial song from reaching the number-one spot and causing wider offence.

The Frankie Goes to Hollywood song "Relax" generated controversy due to its suggestive lyrics; the chorus contained double entendres such as "when you want to suck to it" and "when you want to come", which were interpreted as being oblique references to oral sex and ejaculation respectively. On 11 January 1984, Radio 1 morning DJ Mike Read stopped the song on-air during a chart rundown to point out its "obscene" lyrics and suggestive cover art, and announced that he would no longer play the song during his show. The BBC subsequently suppressed the song from most airplay on Radio 1, and banned the song from appearing on its television programme Top of the Pops. The controversy only increased interest in the single, causing "Relax" to become the number-one song in the UK two weeks later. In July 1984, it peaked again at number-two following the release of the subsequent single "Two Tribes".

In December 2007, BBC Radio 1 began to play a version of The Pogues' popular Christmas song "Fairytale of New York" that censored the words "faggot" and "slut" from one of its verses. The BBC cited concerns over the homophobic slurs as reasoning, despite the song having historically been played without censorship. The BBC reversed the decision after it was criticized by listeners, the band itself, and the mother of the song's featured vocalist Kirsty MacColl. Radio 1 controller Andy Parfitt argued that "While we would never condone prejudice of any kind, we know our audiences are smart enough to distinguish between maliciousness and creative freedom. In the context of this song, I do not feel that there is any negative intent behind the use of the words, hence the reversal of the decision." In November 2020, it was announced that Radio 1 would return to playing the censored version again; sister station BBC Radio 2 would still play the original version, and BBC Radio 6 Music would air either version at the discretion of DJs.

As the song's subject matter was deemed too inappropriate for airplay pre-watershed, BBC Radio 1 played an edited version of Rihanna's song "S&M" during the daytime hours, and referred to the song using the alternate title "Come On". As Rihanna objected to the censorship of the song's title, the BBC later compromised by referring to the song as "S&M (Come On)". For the same reasons, Ofcom deemed the song's music video to be unfit for broadcast pre-watershed.

After the 2013 death of former Prime Minister Margaret Thatcher, "Ding-Dong! The Witch Is Dead" from the film The Wizard of Oz reached No. 2 on the UK Singles Chart, as the result of a social media campaign celebrating the death of the controversial PM. BBC Radio 1 did not play the full song during The Official Chart programme, and instead played a short snippet accompanied by a Newsbeat report discussing the campaign. The action led to complaints that the BBC were deliberately censoring the song due to its negativity in this context, noting that Notsensibles' "I'm in Love with Margaret Thatcher" (which also charted, as part of an effort to counter the "Witch" campaign) was played in full earlier in the show. The BBC Trust's Editorial Standards Committee upheld its decision not to play the song, due to its context as a celebration of Thatcher's death.

"Liar Liar GE2017", a song released during the run-up to the 2017 general election that is critical of prime minister Theresa May, was not played by British radio stations due to broadcasting regulations in force during electoral campaigns, which forbid political advertising and require all broadcasters to practice impartial coverage. Despite the suppression, the song still managed to reach #4 on the UK Singles Chart.

=== United States ===
The Parental Advisory label was voluntarily adopted by the U.S. music industry to designate recordings that may contain objectionable content.

While music can be classified as a protected form of expression under the First Amendment, there have still been instances of voluntary censorship within the music industry, particularly in regards to protecting children from being exposed to age-inappropriate subject matter, corporate objections to an artist's work, and by broadcast radio and television stations to remain in compliance with the regulations of the Federal Communications Commission (FCC). The 1978 Supreme Court case FCC v. Pacifica Foundation established that the FCC had the power to regulate the broadcast of content considered "indecent" on terrestrial radio and television.

In the 1970s, the Native American band XIT was targeted due to its radical support of the 1969 to 1971 Occupation of Alcatraz, affiliation with the civil rights group American Indian Movement, as well as its debut concept album Plight of the Redman —which denounced the historical treatment of Native Americans by the government. The FBI threatened to audit the band's label Motown if they did not cease promotion of the album.

In 1985, the Parents Music Resource Center (PMRC), founded by Tipper Gore, published the "Filthy Fifteen"—a list of fifteen songs it deemed to be the most objectionable due to their references to drugs and alcohol, sexual acts, violence, or "occult" activities. The group pushed for the adoption of a ratings system, and for lyrics to be printed on the back covers of albums so they could be previewed by parents. The Recording Industry Association of America (RIAA) opposed these proposals; during a Senate hearing on the matter in September, musicians such as John Denver and Frank Zappa argued that such guidelines would inhibit free expression. Zappa, in particular, argued that the PMRC's proposal for a method to "assist baffled parents in the determination of the 'suitability' of records listened to by 'very young children'" would reduce American music to "the intellectual level of a Saturday-morning cartoon".

Following the hearings, the RIAA introduced a standard Parental Advisory label (which took its current form, reading "Parental Advisory — Explicit Content", in 1994 following subsequent hearings), which is designed to be applied to the cover art of songs and albums which contain "strong language or depictions of violence, sex, or substance abuse to such an extent as to merit parental notification." The Parental Advisory label is a voluntary scheme; some retailers—particularly Walmart—made it a corporate policy to not stock any music release that carries the label.

Gangsta rap generated controversies due to its often-provocative subject matter. "Fuck tha Police", a song from N.W.A's debut album Straight Outta Compton, proved to be especially controversial; the song criticized police brutality and racial profiling, and contained lyrics condoning violence against police officers. Civil rights activist C. Delores Tucker was also notable for her opposition to gangsta rap. She was known for distributing flyers outside record stores, as well as buying stock in media companies so she could protest the songs at shareholders' meetings. Tucker was notably dissed in other songs over her criticism of the genre, including Tupac's "How Do U Want It". Tucker sued Tupac's estate for emotional distress and slander over the song; the suit was later dismissed.

In 1990, Florida political activist Jack Thompson targeted the Miami-based 2 Live Crew and their album As Nasty as They Wanna Be—which featured songs such as "Me So Horny"—claiming that it was obscene. In March 1990, the group filed a lawsuit in a U.S. district court to overturn a Broward County ruling that declared the album obscene, but it was upheld by Judge Jose Alejandro Gonzalez Jr. In 1992, the Eleventh Circuit Court of Appeals overturned the Gonzalez decision, ruling that the case presented insufficient evidence that the album passed the Miller test established by the Supreme Court to determine whether a work is obscene (which includes a lack of artistic merit).

The television channel MTV was also known for censoring objectionable content from music videos, and restricting some particularly-controversial videos to late-night airplay—such as The Prodigy's "Smack My Bitch Up" due to its violent imagery and misogynistic lyrics, and Sir Mix-a-Lot's "Baby Got Back" for its suggestive subject matter. Several Madonna videos have also been banned by the channel, including the sexually-explicit "Justify My Love" and "Erotica", and "What It Feels Like for a Girl" (aside from a one-off airing by MTV and sister channel VH1 for its world premiere) due to its violent content. "Justify My Love" was subsequently released as a video single on VHS; it would become the best-selling video single of all time, selling over 200,000 copies in the U.S. and receiving a 4x Platinum certification by the RIAA. It also received a broadcast television airing on ABC's late-night news program Nightline, accompanied by an interview between Madonna and host Forrest Sawyer.

In the aftermath of the MTV-produced Super Bowl XXXVIII halftime show (which was televised by its corporate sister CBS)—where Janet Jackson's breast was exposed by Justin Timberlake at the conclusion of the show in an apparent "wardrobe malfunction"—the FCC launched a major crackdown against indecent material broadcast on terrestrial radio and television stations. Some rock radio stations removed or censored certain songs so they would not run afoul of the stricter enforcement, while MTV moved several videos with sexually suggestive imagery to late-night hours. In addition, Jackson was blacklisted by CBS and MTV's parent company Viacom, resulting in her music being pulled from its television and radio outlets, and Jackson being removed from the CBS-televised 46th Grammy Awards (where she had been scheduled to introduce a tribute to Luther Vandross). CBS also aired the ceremony under a five-minute delay in order to ensure that no objectionable content was seen during the telecast. The blacklisting caused Janet Jackson's subsequent album Damita Jo to underperform, due to reduced promotion and single airplay.

=== Vietnam ===
During the era of the Vietnam War, popular music of South Vietnam, which was mainly associated with the Bolero genre, became colloquially known as yellow music, in opposition to red music endorsed by the Communist government of North Vietnam. After the Fall of Saigon in 1975, the music was banned altogether. Those caught listening to yellow music after North and South Vietnam were reunified would be punished, and their music would be confiscated and destroyed, due to the belief that it contained "ideas that were not good, not healthy, that required criticism.". Many South Vietnamese artists migrated to the United States, and continued to sing in exile. In 1986, the ban was lightened and love songs could be written again, but by then the music industry had ceased to exist.

The government of the unified Communist Vietnam also prohibited the sale of overseas Vietnamese music, including variety shows like Asia and Paris by Night. In recent years however, bolero had grown popular again, as more overseas singers performed in Vietnam. Additionally, singing competition television series like Boléro Idol have grown popular, with singers performing songs, including those formerly banned.

=== Zimbabwe ===
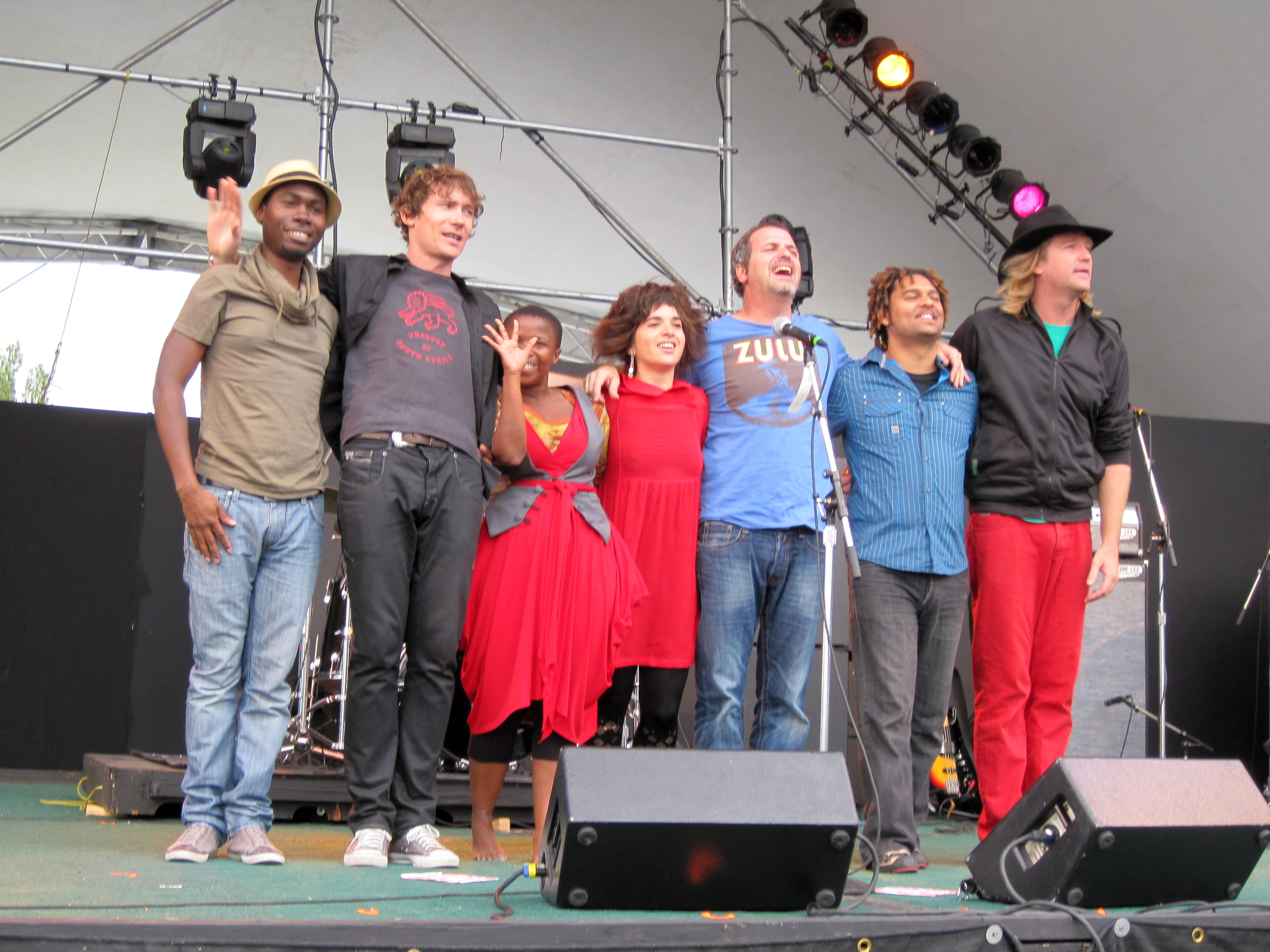
Freshlyground was briefly banned from Zimbabwe after releasing a song critical of the country's president.

Legally, musicians are required to be certified under the Censorship and Entertainment Control Act, 1967 in order to perform and release music in Zimbabwe. This led to a large amount of self-censorship during the regime of Robert Mugabe, with many musicians choosing to primarily perform propaganda music glorifying the Mugabe government since the Zimbabwe Broadcasting Corporation refused to play songs critical of the then-President.

In 2010, the South African band Freshlyground released the music video "Chicken for Change" in collaboration with the local news comedy programme ZANEWS, which mocked Mugabe. The video faced criticism from local officials, leading to the band being denied entry into the country for at least eight years. The band attempted to perform at the Harare International Festival of the Arts in 2014, but were turned away at Harare International Airport with no reason given by local officials. In 2017, Mugabe was removed from power in a coup, and Freshlyground would ultimately close the festival in 2018.

Even after the fall of Mugabe's government, some censorship of music has continued to exist in the country; reggae artist Winky D was pulled by the Zimbabwe Broadcasting Corporation in 2023 over songs on his album Eureka Eureka, but this blacklisting was lifted in 2024 following a change in management.
