= Censorship on MTV =

Shows or music videos edited or removed for controversy

Censorship on MTV has been the subject of debate for years. MTV was the first and most popular music television network in the U.S., and has come under criticism for alleged censorship in its programming. Throughout the decades, MTV has altered or removed shows from the channel's schedule to address complaints; and music videos have been censored, moved to late-night rotation, or banned from the channel's rotation for various types of controversial content.

== Censorship in full-length programming ==
The hit show Jackass was subject to frequent censorship in the early 2000s. The popularity of the show, combined with the propensity of young viewers to attempt to imitate the show's risky stunts, led to substantial controversy. Although the show featured prominent warning messages at its start, end, and upon return from all commercial breaks urging viewers not to re-create any stunts seen on the program, nor submit footage to the network of those stunts for casting consideration on that or other MTV series, the show was nonetheless blamed for many injuries. In 2001, then-Senator Joe Lieberman urged Viacom to take more responsibility for the program's content; which led MTV to only air the show after 10 p.m. The creators of Jackass expressed frustration over the restraints that MTV's producers imposed on stunts after Lieberman's statement. These limitations eventually led to the departure of several cast members, and to the conclusion of the show.

MTV's influence also affected its famous animated program, Beavis and Butt-Head. In the wake of a controversy that followed a child burning down his house after allegedly watching the show, producers moved the show from its original 7 p.m. time slot to a late-night, 11 p.m. slot. Beavis' tendency to flick a lighter and chant the word "fire" was removed from new episodes, and controversial scenes were removed from existing episodes before rebroadcast. Some of the edits were so extensive that when series creator Mike Judge compiled his Collection DVDs he commented that "some of those episodes may not even exist actually in their original form".

The Parents Television and Media Council has argued that much of the censored material on MTV is easily discernible because of the context in which it is presented.

== Censorship of music videos ==
MTV has frequently edited music videos to remove lyrical references to alcohol, tobacco, drugs, sex, nudity, violence, weapons, homophobia, ableism, suicide, religion or advertising, and completely edits out swear words. Usually, all racial slurs are censored on MTV music videos and programming, and MTV has emphasized racial tolerance for people of all races and creeds.

Examples of lyric edits have included:

- In the song "Beautiful Girls" by Sean Kingston, the word "suicidal" in the chorus was altered to "in denial".
- In Michael Jackson's single "They Don't Care About Us", MTV has replaced the words "Jew me" and "kike me" with "do me" and "strike me" in the line "Jew me, sue me, everybody do me / Kick me, kike me, don't you black or white me." Jackson later explained that the song used the words to describe prejudice and that it was poor judgment to select Jewish people as explanatory words.
- "This Love" by Maroon 5 had the words "coming" and "sinking" muted out due to possible sexual connotations.
- "Pumped Up Kicks" by Foster the People was edited to remove references to the song's subject daring people to "outrun my gun" and to run "faster than my bullet".

=== Videos moved to late-night or obscure rotation ===
In attempt to address criticism over risqué content, MTV has sometimes moved certain videos to late-night rotation in censored format.

==== Sexual content ====
- "If I Could Turn Back Time" by Cher was pushed to hours after 9 p.m. due to the singer's revealing clothing.
- "Baby Got Back" by Sir Mix-a-Lot was aired only after 9 p.m., due to its depictions of women's bodies. (The station had recently instated a policy against showing female body parts with no reference to a face.)
- "Closer" by American industrial rock band Nine Inch Nails was heavily censored when aired on MTV due to sexually explicit imagery that contained a nude bald woman wearing a crucifix mask, NIN frontman Trent Reznor in bondage, and an image of a vulva, along with the song's notorious lyric "I wanna fuck you like an animal." The objectionable content was replaced with a picture that said "scene missing".
- The song "Étienne" by Guesch Patti was moved to late-night rotation in MTV Europe in 1987 due to a striptease scene.
- In February 2004, following the controversial Super Bowl XXXVIII halftime show in which performer Justin Timberlake exposed the breast of co-performer Janet Jackson, MTV made several efforts to limit daytime rotation of music videos that could be perceived to have too much sexual content. Such videos included:
  - "Hotel" by Cassidy
  - "I Miss You" by Blink-182
  - "Salt Shaker" by Ying Yang Twins
  - "Splash Waterfalls" by Ludacris
  - "The Jump Off" by Lil' Kim
  - "This Love" by Maroon 5
  - "Dirrty" by Christina Aguilera
  - "Toxic" by Britney Spears

==== Misogyny ====
- "Smack My Bitch Up" by The Prodigy was initially given late-night rotation on MTV's 120 Minutes on December 7, 1997 due to a fistfight, sexual scenes and allegedly misogynistic language in the lyrics but was removed from rotation altogether after around two weeks, a decision supported by the feminist group National Organization for Women. During the brief time it aired, MTV opted to air the video uncensored with an advisory from MTV News' Kurt Loder, while 120 Minutes showed interview footage of artists like Moby and Chumbawumba objecting to the content of the video. In 2002, MTV's Most Controversial Videos countdown ranked the video as #1; MTV2's version of the countdown showed the video fully uncensored.

==== Political content ====
- In 2002, only MTV2 would play the Public Enemy video "Gotta Give the Peeps What They Need", because it contained "free Mumia" in the lyrics.
- In 2004, the video for "Megalomaniac" by Incubus was moved to late-night because of depictions of German leader Adolf Hitler and people drinking oil.
- Also in 2004, alleged glorification of gun violence led MTV to play an edited version of the video "99 Problems" by Jay-Z between 6 p.m. and 6 a.m. only.

==== Foreign edits ====
- "Turn Me On" by Riton and Oliver Heldens featuring Vula – all shots where some doctors try to cut out a man's heart, along with the close-up of the man were replaced by completely different scenes due to violence.
  - This edit was made on MTV's sister channel MTV Hits.

== Banned music videos ==
=== From MTV in the United States ===
Several videos have been perceived as too controversial to play on MTV even in censored form, for varying reasons. In the 1980s, parent-media watchdog groups such as the PMRC criticized MTV over certain music videos that were claimed to have explicit imagery of Satanism. MTV has developed a strict policy refusing to air videos that may depict devil worship or anti-religious bigotry.

- "American Life" (Madonna) – pulled by the artist and replaced with a second version due to it having anti-Iraq War themes.
- "Arise" (Sepultura) – banned for apocalyptic religious imagery, including crucified figures wearing gas masks
- "A Tout le Monde" (Megadeth) – banned for alleged suicide lyrics
- "Be Chrool to Your Scuel" (Twisted Sister) – banned for showing zombies in a school engaging in suggestive acts
- "Body Language" (Queen) – banned due to erotic and homoerotic content
- "Bombs" (Faithless) – banned over use of violent imagery to convey an anti-war message
- "California" (Wax) – banned due to its depiction of a stunt involving a man on fire
- "Closer" (Nine Inch Nails) – banned for depiction of nudity, S&M bondage, a live monkey being strapped to a crucifix, and sexually charged lyrics. An edited version was also made to censor some of the explicit content.
- "Erotica" (Madonna) – banned from the MTV music channel, but later seen in the Beavis and Butt-Head episode "Door to Door"
- "Ghost Ride It" (Mistah F.A.B.) – banned due to allegations of encouraging dangerous driving behavior; as well as copyright complaints about the car used in the video
- "Happiness in Slavery" (Nine Inch Nails) – banned for nudity, simulated gore, and unsimulated sexual torture by performance artist Bob Flanagan
- "Hurricane" (Thirty Seconds to Mars) – banned for containing sexually explicit scenes and violent imagery
- "In My Darkest Hour" (Megadeth) – banned for alleged suicide references
- "I Want to Break Free" (Queen) – banned for depicting crossdressing and transsexuality.
- "Jesus Christ Pose" (Soundgarden) – banned for depicting a blindfolded girl and a mechanical skeleton on a cross, followed by several crosses that flashed repeatedly from upright to inverted positions
- "Justify My Love" (Madonna) – banned for containing explicit imagery of sadomasochism, voyeurism, and bisexuality
- "Lacquer Head" (Primus) – banned for lyrics describing minors using drugs; the music video also featured a child watching TV while a devilish creature administers gasoline to the child, who then explodes into a frenzy (with the creature riding on him) and ultimately crashing into a wall, burning to ashes
- "Pagan Poetry" (Björk) – banned due to highly distorted images of sexually explicit scenes involving fellatio and ejaculation. It eventually aired on MTV2's countdown of the '20 Most Controversial Music Videos.'
- "Prison Sex" (Tool) – was played initially, but later pulled from the air due to disturbing content and depiction of molestation
- "Pumps and a Bump" (MC Hammer) – banned due to Hammer wearing a zebra-print speedo with a visible bulge. An alternate video was filmed to replace it with Hammer fully clothed.
- "Quote Unquote" (Mr. Bungle) – banned due to creepy imagery and several characters being hanged.
- "Reckoning Day" (Megadeth) – allegedly banned due to management conflicts
- "s(AINT)" (Marilyn Manson) – banned for explicit depictions of sex, drug use, and self-inflicted violence.
- "Six, Six, Six" (DeGarmo and Key) – pulled due to images of an Anti-Christ engulfed in flames; later re-added to rotation in an edited form
- "Sunshowers" (M.I.A.) – banned for objectionable lyrics
- "The Creature from the Black Leather Lagoon" (The Cramps) – banned for erotic content
- "The Price of Beauty" (Suicide Silence) – banned for gore
- "Tormented Mind" (Burning Human) – banned for violence
- "Try That in a Small Town" (Jason Aldean) – banned for criticisms of selected organisations.
- "What It Feels Like for a Girl" (Madonna) – banned for violent content throughout
- "When the Lady Smiles" (Golden Earring) – banned for raping a nun on a metro car

=== From MTV in the United Kingdom ===
- "My Favourite Game" by The Cardigans – filmed with five different endings; most of which were banned on MTV UK due to fears that the video could encourage joyriding and cause car accidents. The two least-violent endings were eventually selected for MTV UK rotation.

== See also ==
- Music censorship
