= Lecocq =

Lecocq is a French surname. Notable people with the surname include:

- Alexandre Charles Lecocq (1832–1918), French operetta composer
- Barbara Ann LeCocq, the birth name of Barbara Lea (1929–2011), American jazz singer
- Bernardo Lecocq (1734–1820), Spanish military engineer
- Charlotte Lecocq (born 1977), French politician
- Francisco Lecocq (1790–1882), Uruguayan entrepreneur and politician
- Jean-Pierre Lecocq (1947–1992), molecular biologist and entrepreneur
- Karen LeCocq, American artist
- Louis LeCocq (1892–1919), American racecar driver
- Marc LeCocq (born 1966), Canadian curler
- Mary LeCocq (1895–1991), American politician
- Pascal Lecocq (born 1958), French painter and set designer
- Stéphane Lecocq (born 1976), French footballer

== See also ==
- Coq
