= Afida Turner =

French singer and actress (born 1976)

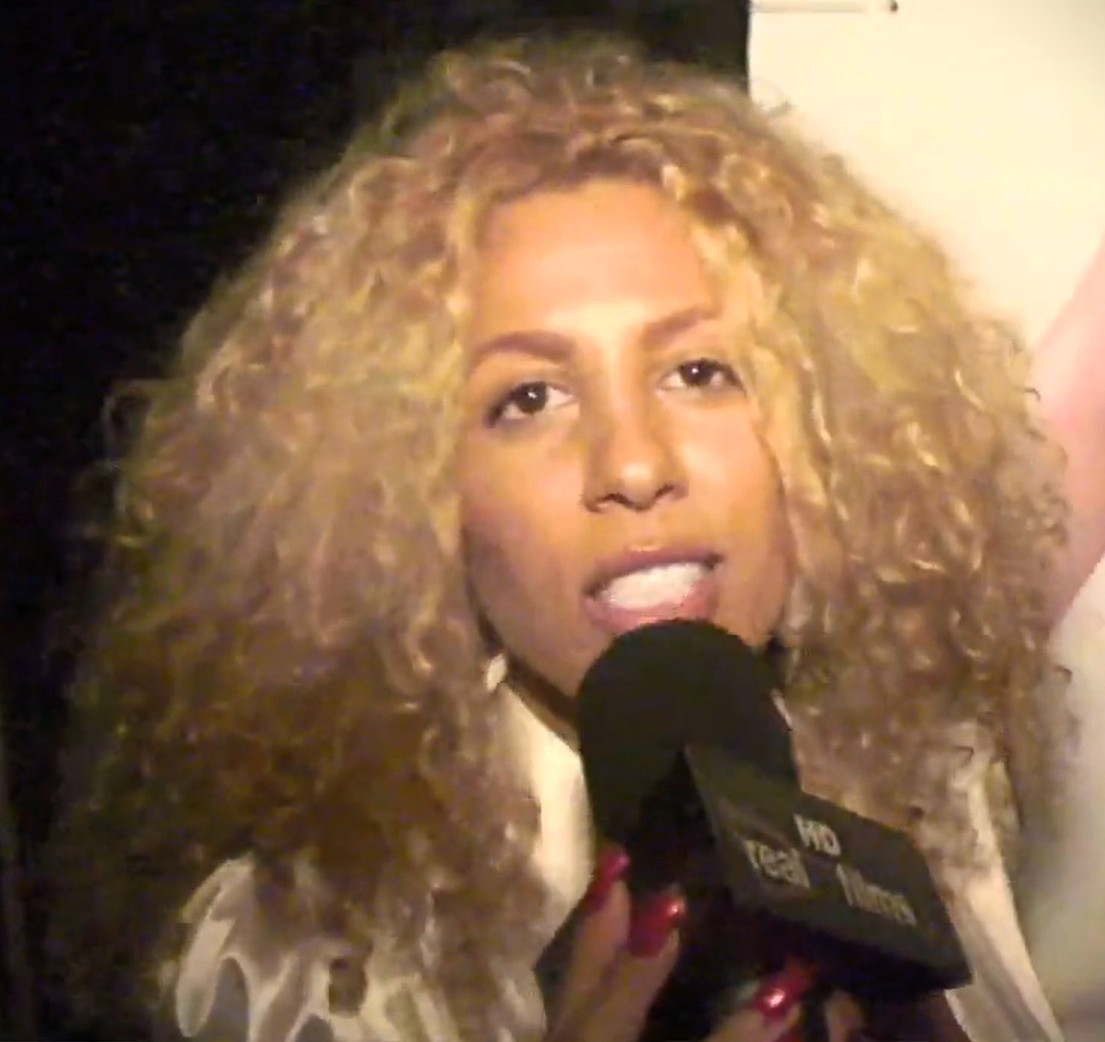
- Afida Turner in 2009
- Born: Hafidda Messaï; December 22, 1976 (age 49); Auchel, Hauts-de-France, France
- Other names: Lesly; Lesly Mess
- Occupations: Media personality, singer
- Years active: 1998-present
- Spouse: Ronnie Turner (m. 2007; died 2022)
- Relatives: Tina Turner (mother-in-law); Ike Turner (father-in-law)
- Musical career
- Instrument: Vocals
- Labels: Columbia
- Website: afidaturner.com

Afida Turner (born Hafidda Messaï; December 22, 1976) is a French media personality and singer. She has released two studio albums and several singles, singing both in French and in English. She has also appeared in small roles in multiple films and starred in the stage play Requiem for une conne (2022). She was married to musician Ronnie Turner from 2007 until his death in 2022.

== Biography ==
Afida Turner was born in Auchel, France. Her father was from Algeria and her mother from Réunion. When she was two years old, her father beat her mother to death. She lived with foster families until she was 16. She then worked as a saleswoman in ready-to-wear and was once employed by the Parisian bar-lounge Buddha Bar.

In the 1990s, she started a singing career, releasing her debut single "Crazy About You" in 1998. She came to the public and media attention in 2002 by appearing in the second season of the French reality TV show Loft Story under the name Lesly.

In 2002, Turner signed with Sony Music and released her debut studio album Roc Attitude under the name Lesly Mess in 2003.

Turner made appearances in three films, Shut Up and Shoot (2006), The Sweep (2008) and Single Black Female (2009).

In 2011, she released her second studio album Paris-Hollywood, which included the single "Come with Me". She subsequently appeared as a guest star and host on various French TV shows.

In 2013, she played a role in the film Visions Interdites.

In 2018, she played a role in the drama Lumière Noire by Enguerrand Jouvin.

In 2022, she played the lead in Requiem pour une conne by Baptiste Souriau at Théâtre Trévise, Paris starting in January and running successfully for six months.

In July 2022, she released a cover version of Guesch Patti's song "Étienne".

== Personal life ==
She had a relationship with Coolio lasting two years and also with American boxer Mike Tyson. In 2007, she married musician Ronnie Turner, the son of Ike Turner and Tina Turner. She started to use the name Afida Turner. Ronnie Turner died aged 62 from colon cancer in Los Angeles on December 8, 2022. At the time Ronnie died, Afida also described herself as being his "nurse."

== Politics ==
On May 31, 2020, Turner announced her candidacy for President of France in the 2022 election. She ran on a platform opposing police violence and in favor of the Yellow Vests Movement. If elected, she would have been the first female and first African President of the Republic. However, on January 11, 2021, she announced that she had withdrawn her candidacy.

== Filmography ==
=== Films ===
- 2006: Shut Up and Shoot! as Fifi Belmondo
- 2008: The Sweep as Bank Manager
- 2009: Single Black Female as Blue
- 2013: Visions Interdites as The Singer
- 2018: Lumière noire as the gynaecologist

=== Television ===
- 2000: H: Woman in the Sabri pub
- 2002: Loft Story
- 2009 Criminal Minds: Herself (season 4, episode 25)
- 2014: Un dîner presque parfait M6
- 2015: Nrj 12 le mag
- 2017: Nrj 12 le mag
- 2020: Touche pas à mon poste
- 2022: Touche pas à mon poste
- 2022: Touche pas à mon poste
- 2022: Un dîner presque parfait : special guest
- 2023: Touche pas à mon poste People

=== Music videos ===
- 2003: Shut Up cameo (Black Eyed Peas)

== Discography ==
=== Albums ===
- 2003: Roc Attitude
- 2011: Paris Hollywood

=== Singles ===
- 1998: Crazy About You
- 2002: Pas celle que tu crois / Tu mens
- 2002: Vilaine fille
- 2003: Repose au paradis / Je t'ai en moi
- 2011: Come with Me
- 2014: Born an Angel
- 2022: Etienne
- 2023: High Energy
- 2024: Barbichette Song

== Theater ==
- 2022: Requiem pour une conne as Ina Star
- 2023: Abracafida !

== Other endeavors ==
- 2002: Book biographie : My father killed my mom by Michel Lafon editions.
- 2016: Afida Turner (fragrance)
- 2016: MuchCouture by Afida Turner (clothing and swimsuit line)
- 2019: Afida Turner jewelry collections by Stephano Andolfi
