= Angela Behelle =

French novelist

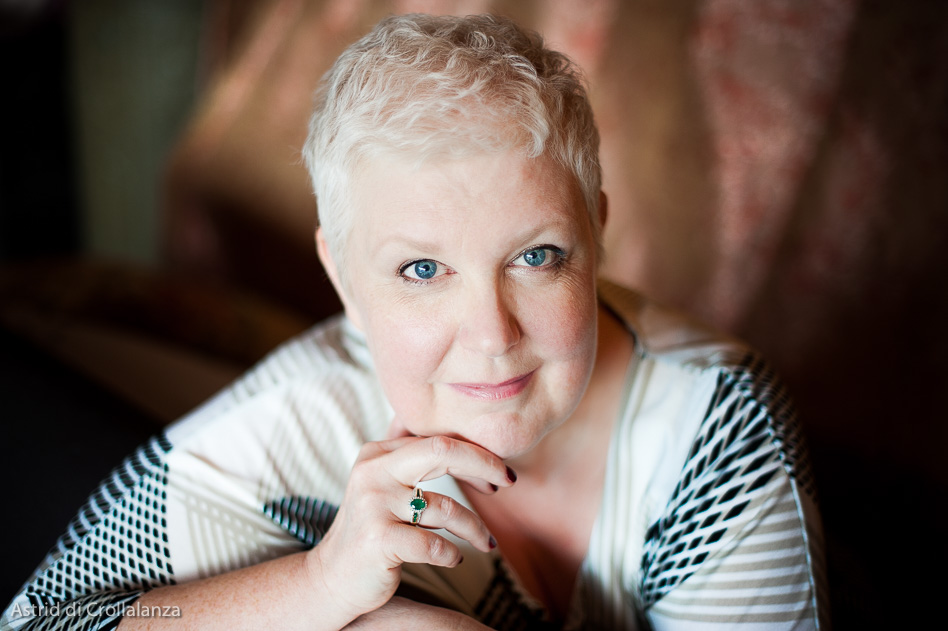
- Born: Angela Behelle; 5 October 1971 (age 55); Auchel, France
- Occupation: Writer
- Writing career
- Pen name: Sylvie Barret
- Notable works: La Société (2012); Voisin, voisine (2014); Demandez-moi la lune (2015); Le Caméléon (2016); Les Terres du Dalahar (2016); L'Enjeu (2016)

Angela Behelle (born October 5, 1971, in Auchel) is a French romance novel writer.

== Biography ==
Angela Behelle was born on October 5, 1971, in Auchel. She spent part of her childhood in Pas-de-Calais and studied law at the University of Lille. After her studies, she moved to Burgundy in the department of Yonne.

She is the author of erotic and romance novels published by various imprints of Groupe Flammarion, including J'ai Lu and Pygmalion, as well as by Éditions Leduc, France Loisirs, and Éditions Blanche.

In June 2012, she published an erotic saga, La Société, about the life of a secret society in the service of influential men. The story led to controversy on French social networks. In 2013, La Société was published as a paperback edition by Éditions J'ai lu. The same year, rumours about a film adaptation reached enthusiastic fans of the series, when Eric Porcher from Kap films and Arnaud Kerneguez from Kanibal searched for an erotic novel to adapt for the screen.

In 2017, a spin-off of the series was published.

== Bibliography ==
=== La Société ===
- Qui de nous deux?, Paris, J'ai lu, "Librio", 2013 ISBN 978-2290075999
- Mission Azerty, Paris, J'ai lu, "Librio", 2014 ISBN 978-2290077047
- À votre service, Paris, J'ai lu, "Librio", 2014 ISBN 978-2290077054
- La Gardienne de l'Oméga, Paris, J'ai lu, "Librio", 2014 ISBN 978-2290100943
- L'Inspiration d’Émeraude, Paris, J'ai lu, "Librio", 2015 ISBN 978-2290100950
- La fille du boudoir, Paris, J'ai lu, "Librio", 2016 ISBN 978-2290100967
- Sur la gamme, Paris, J'ai lu, "Librio", 2016 ISBN 978-2290119525
- Le Premier Pas, Paris, J'ai lu, "Fantasme Poche", 2017 ISBN 978-2290119532
- Secrets diplomatiques, Paris, J'ai lu, "Fantasme Poche", 2017 ISBN 978-2290119549
- Paris-New York, Paris, J'ai lu, "Fantasme Poche", 2017 ISBN 978-2290119570

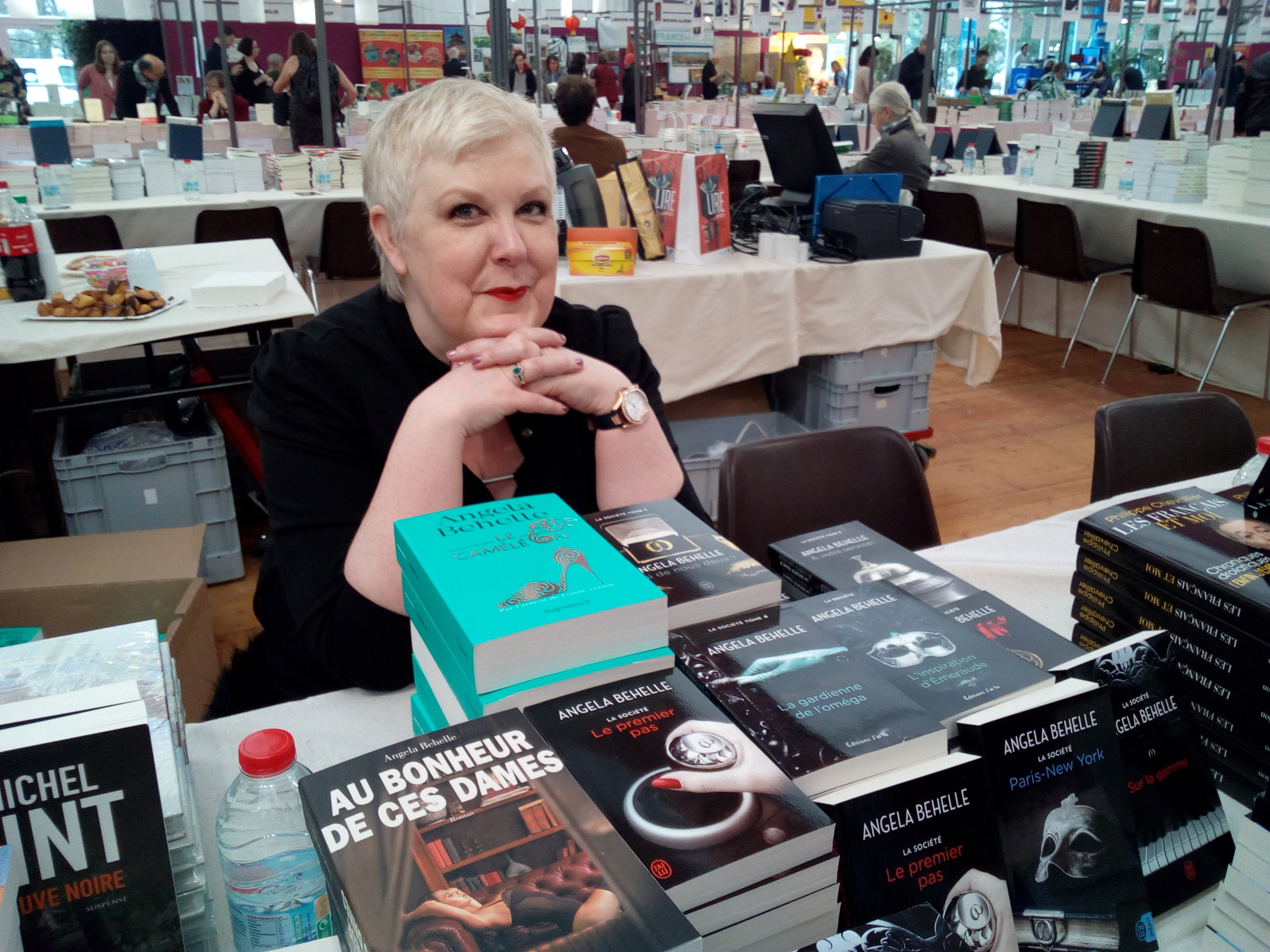
At the Lire à Limoges Book Fair in 2017

=== Spin-off of La Société ===
- L'Enjeu, Paris, Pygmalion, "Novels", 2017 ISBN 978-2756418902

=== Novels ===
- Voisin, Voisine, Paris, J'ai lu, "J'ai lu pour elle", 2014 ISBN 978-2290098486
- Au bonheur de ces dames, Paris, Éditions Blanche, "Blanche", 2015 ISBN 978-2846283595
- Le Caméléon, Paris, Pygmalion, "Novels", 2016 ISBN 978-2290119570
- Loup y es-tu?, Paris, Pygmalion, "Novels", 2018 ISBN 978-2756422183

=== Books under pen name Sylvie Barret ===
- Demandez-moi la lune!, Paris, J'ai lu, "J'ai lu pour elle", 2015 ISBN 978-2290099094
- Les Terres du Dalahar, Paris, J'ai lu, "Darklight", 2016 ISBN 978-2290122358
