= Auchel =

- Commune
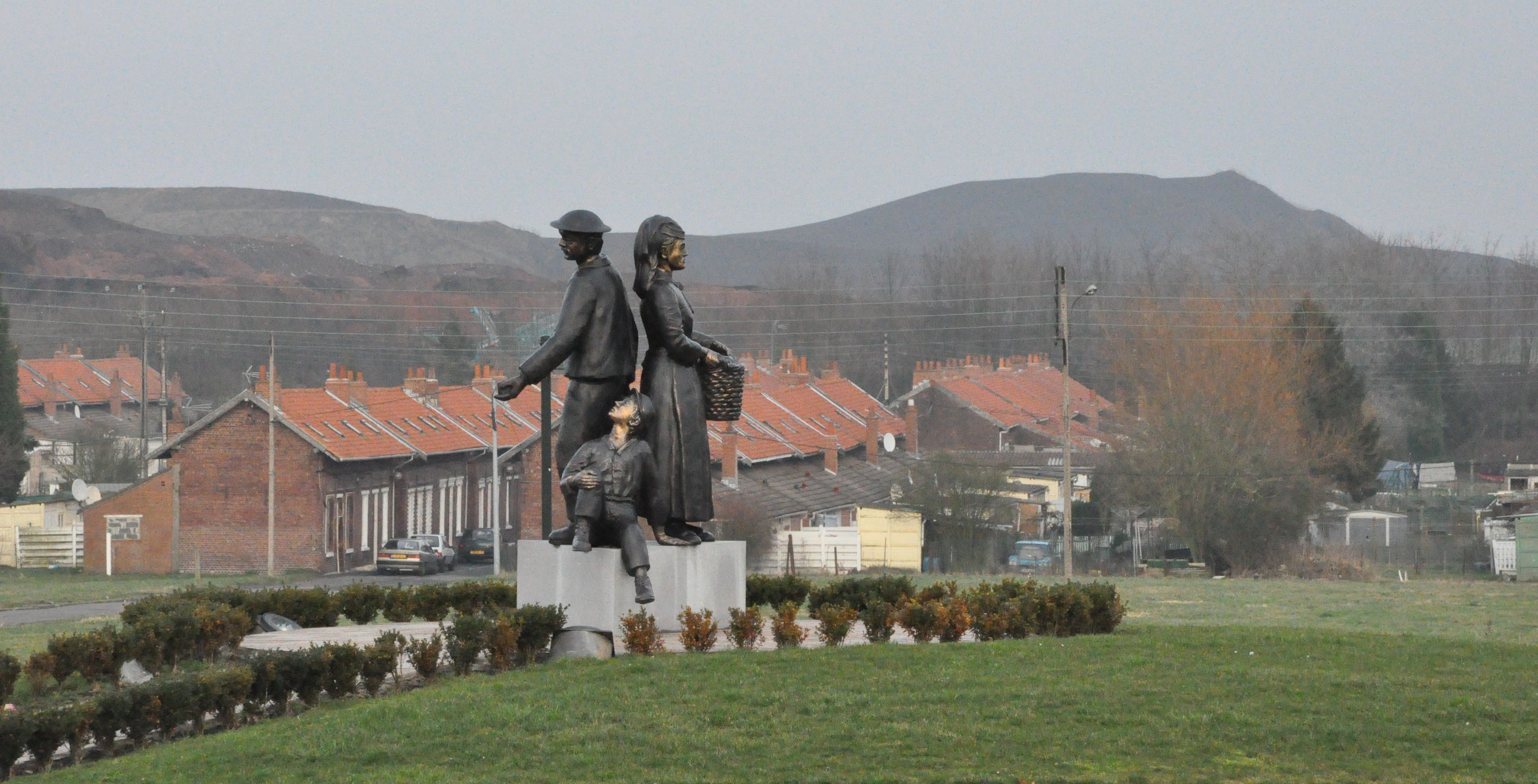
- The mining memorial
- Location of Auchel
- Location within France Location within Hauts-de-France
- Coordinates: 50°30′31″N 2°28′28″E
- Country: France
- Region: Hauts-de-France
- Department: Pas-de-Calais
- Arrondissement: Béthune
- Canton: Auchel
- Intercommunality: CA Béthune-Bruay, Artois-Lys Romane

Government
  - Mayor (2020–2026): Phillibert Berrier
- Area^{1}: 6 km^{2} (2.3 sq mi)
- Elevation: 99 m (325 ft)
- Highest elevation: 157 m (515 ft)
- Lowest elevation: 68 m (223 ft)
- Population (2023): 10,051
  - Density: 1,700/km^{2} (4,300/sq mi)
- Time zone: UTC+01:00 (CET)
  - Summer (DST): UTC+02:00 (CEST)
- INSEE/Postal code: 62048 /62260
- ^{1} French Land Register data, which excludes lakes, ponds, glaciers > 1 km^{2} (0.386 sq mi or 247 acres) and river estuaries.

Auchel (French pronunciation: [oʃɛl]; Picard: Auchez) is a commune in the Pas-de-Calais department in the Hauts-de-France region in northern France.

== Geography ==
An ex-mining town, nowadays a light industrial & farming commune, situated 8 miles (13 km) southwest of Béthune and 34 miles (55 km) southwest of Lille, at the junction of the D183 and the D183E roads.

== History ==
Following the discovery of coal deposits in the area in 1851, the town grew as the demand for coal increased in France. This old mining town had close to 15,000 inhabitants in the 1950s.
The coal recession in the late 1960s lead to a constant decline in population, despite the efforts of the municipality to attract and keep people here during and after the recession.

== Population ==
The inhabitants are called Auchellois.

Historical population
Year	Pop.	±% p.a.
1968	14,091	—
1975	13,329	−0.79%
1982	12,535	−0.87%
1990	11,813	−0.74%
1999	11,392	−0.40%
2007	11,225	−0.18%
2012	10,991	−0.42%
2017	10,291	−1.31%
2023	10,051	−0.39%
Source: INSEE

== Sights ==
- The church of St. Martin, dating from the sixteenth century.
- A museum about coal mining.

== International relations ==
Auchel is twinned with:

- West Malling, in the county of Kent, England.
- Iserlohn, in North Rhine-Westphalia, Germany.

== Notable people ==
Auchel is the birthplace of:

- Xavier Beauvois, actor, director and screenwriter.
- Angela Behelle, writer
- Pierre Laigle, football player
- Augustin Lesage, French spiritualist artist. Lesage is one of the most fascinating figures associated with Art Brut
- Stéphane Lecocq, professional footballer
- Afida Turner, singer, songwriter, actress, and media personality
- Pierre Waché, Formula One engineer and technical director for Red Bull Racing
- François Duhamel professional footballer

== See also ==
- Communes of the Pas-de-Calais department
