= List of K-pop music videos banned by South Korean television networks =

The following is a non-exhaustive list of K-pop videos that have been banned by one or more South Korean television networks, for reasons such as suggestive or offensive lyrics and imagery.

K-pop is characterized by a wide variety of audiovisual elements, and K-pop singles will typically include a music video and a dance routine. There is a history of media censorship and conservatism in South Korea, and as a result, many risque or explicit K-pop songs or videos have been banned from airing by the country's major television and radio networks. Other reasons for a ban are songs featuring Japanese lyrics, negative influences upon youth, or product placement, either in the song or within the video the use of brand names.

KBS, MBC, and SBS are the three networks, and account for the vast majority of banned K-pop videos. Between 2009 and 2012, they banned over 1,300 K-pop songs. This list only includes titular K-pop songs that have an accompanying music video, but many K-pop songs that were not title tracks have been banned as well. However, social media and YouTube have allowed singers and bands to round these restrictions, and may in themselves pressure networks to accept videos after their online popularity has been proven with appropriate edits.

== List of banned K-pop music videos ==
Song title	Artist	Reason	Year	Banned by
"10 Minutes"	Lee Hyori	Sexually suggestive scenes	2003	SBS
"Chitty Chitty Bang Bang"	Lee Hyori	Depictions of unsafe driving, including dancing atop vehicles and in roadways, and operating a vehicle without a seatbelt.	2010	KBS
"Turn It Up"	T.O.P	Indirect advertisement.	2010	MBC
"How Dare You"	Sistar	Pole dance moves and belittling lyrics.	2010	KBS
"Udon"	Kang Min-kyung and Son Dong-woon	Use of a Japanese word for the title.	2010	KBS
"Freeze!"	Block B	Lyrics describing unwholesome dating methods. It was banned twice after the lyrics were edited.	2011	KBS
"I Remember"	Bang Yong-guk and Yang Yo-seob	Scenes containing shooting and violence.	2011	KBS
"Rocket Girl"	Stellar	Violence and sexually suggestive content.	2011	KBS
"Dreaming I"	F.Cuz	Rebellious plot that could be a negative influence for teenagers	2012	KBS
"Gentleman"	Psy	Showing destruction of public property.	2013	KBS
"Bad Girls"	Lee Hyori	Problematic scenes including a student using a slingshot and a teacher who sexually assaults the students.	2013	KBS
"Shower Later"	Gary	Mature, provocative content, curses, and inappropriate expressions.	2014	KBS, MBC, SBS
"Marionette"	Stellar	Explicit dance moves, nudity.	2014	KBS
"Beep"	Park Ji-yoon	Closing credits were excessively long.	2014	KBS
"I'll Call Ya"	M.O.A.	Poor video quality.	2014	KBS
"Pass Me By"	Brown Eyed Soul	Use of trademark or brand names.	2014	KBS
"Catallena"	Orange Caramel	Showing disregard for human life by wrapping the singers in plastic packages and dressing them in sushi costumes.	2014	KBS
"Uh-ee"	Crayon Pop	Use of a Japanese word.	2014	KBS
"One More"	Fiestar	Lyrics alluding to a threesome.	2014	MBC
"Paradise Lost"	Gain	Provocative dance moves.	2015	KBS, MBC, SBS
"Joker"	Dal Shabet	Sexual curse words and explicit imagery.	2015	KBS
"Dope"	BTS	Vulgar lyrics.	2015	KBS
"We Like 2 Party"	BigBang	Indirect advertisement and profanity.	2015	KBS
"Fly"	Jessica	Use of brand names.	2016	KBS
"January"	Beenzino	Facebook product placement.	2016	KBS
"Lotto"	Exo	Reference to the sportswear brand of the same name.	2016	KBS, MBC
"Fxxk It"	BigBang	Explicit lyrics, including slang words.	2016	KBS
"Body"	Mino	Use of brand name.	2016	KBS
"Full House"	MOBB	Use of brand name, derogatory remarks, and mention of drunk driving.	2016	KBS
"Holup!"	Bobby	Swearing, derogatory terms, Japanese lyrics, uses of brand names, and alcohol abuse.	2016	KBS
"Island"	Winner	Language about sexual relations between men and women or homosexuality, obscene content.	2017	KBS
"Angel"	Hoya	Sexual content within the lyrics.	2018	KBS
"Cherry Bomb"	NCT 127	Violent lyrics. Remained banned after second review.	2017	KBS
"Oh Nana"	Kard	Instagram product placement.	2017	KBS
"Love Don't Hurt"	Shannon	Imagery of nudity, tattoos, and smoking.	2017	KBS
"DDD"	EXID	Profane lyrics.	2017	KBS
"Instagram"	Dean	Instagram reference.	2017	KBS

== Aftermath of bans ==
Often, the entertainment company that owns the banned song attempt to revise the song and have it reevaluated by the broadcaster's standards and practices department, and will edit the music video to remove the scenes in question, or even create a special 'network cut' meant for broadcast by that network. Other times, they may alter the explicit dance moves or change a song's lyrics so that the song may still be performed on music shows, such as Music Bank. In the case of Exo's "Lotto," which was banned due to it referring to the sportswear brand, the group substituted the word with "louder" to be able to perform it on KBS and MBC.

Although K-pop songs and videos are often banned by KBS, MBC or SBS are more lenient in their content adjustments. Some groups are content to promote themselves on networks other than KBS and do not make any changes to their original material. In regards to Psy's "Gentleman," a spokesperson for YG Entertainment said they had no plans to submit a different version of their video, and they followed the decision made by KBS.

When 12 of 18 songs for Cheetah's 2018 album 28 Identity were deemed unfit for broadcast by KBS and five by SBS, the agency stated that they did not plan on making any changes to the lyrics to "keep the original intentions and meanings of the song."

== See also ==
- Censorship of Japanese media in South Korea
