= François Duhamel =

French footballer (born 1984)

Personal information
- Date of birth: 20 November 1984 (age 41)
- Place of birth: Auchel, France
- Height: 1.75 m (5 ft 9 in)
- Position: Midfielder

Senior career*
| Years | Team | Apps | (Gls) |
| 2002–2005 | Châteauroux | 19 | (1) |
| 2005–2006 | SO Châtellerault | 17 | (2) |
| 2006–2007 | AS Beauvais | 13 | (1) |
| 2007–2010 | Moulins | 56 | (4) |
| 2010–2012 | Carquefou | 47 | (3) |
| 2012–2013 | Vendée Fontenay | | |
| 2013–2015 | US Saint-Malo | | |
- * Club domestic league appearances and goals

François Duhamel (born 20 November 1984) is a French former professional footballer who played as a midfielder. He played on the professional level in Ligue 2 for Châteauroux and in the Championnat National for Moulins.
