= Stéphane Lecocq =

French footballer (born 1976)

Personal information
- Date of birth: October 22, 1976 (age 50)
- Place of birth: Auchel, France
- Height: 1.84 m (6 ft 1/2 in)
- Position: Striker

Team information
- Current team: USL Dunkerque

Senior career*
Years	Team	Apps	(Gls)
1996–2001	Amiens	24	(2)
1999–2000	→ AS Beauvais (loan)		
2001–2002	FC Rouen		
2002–2004	AS Cherbourg		
2004–2005	AS Cannes		
2005–2006	ES Wasquehal		
2006–	USL Dunkerque		
- * Club domestic league appearances and goals as of 19:10, 23 November 2009 (UTC)

Stéphane Lecocq (born October 22, 1976, in Auchel) is a French former professional football player who played in Ligue 2 for Amiens SC.
