= Étienne (song) =

Single by Guesch Patti

from the album Labyrinthe
- B-side: "Un espoir"
- Released: 1987
- Studio: Piccolo (Paris)
- Genre: Pop rock
- Length: 4:07
- Label: EMI
- Composer: Vincent Bruley
- Lyricist: Guesch Patti
- Producers: Jean M'Ba; R. Walter

Guesch Patti singles chronology
"Étienne" (1987)	"Let Be Must the Queen" (1988)

Music video
- "Étienne" on YouTube

"Étienne" is a 1987 song recorded by French artist Guesch Patti, from her album, Labyrinthe. It was released as her debut single in late 1987 in several European countries. Particularly famous for its suggestive music video which was censored on certain TV channels, the song was a great success in France, Italy, Switzerland, Austria and Germany where it was a top ten hit.

== Critical reception ==
According to French charts expert Elia Habib, the success of this song results from an alchemy between several of its components, including "Guesch Patti's voice first, which makes a success of a very provocative interpretation of the song, alternating sensual moanings and passionate shouts; the text of course is full of suggestive sonorities; the music, which play a large part in the song's success in the production of the text, since the feline rhythmic of the intro until the nervous chord of the electrical guitar, and the videoclip, which is of an erotic esthetism carried by an arousing choreography". A review in Pan-European magazine Music & Media deemed the song an "intriguing, driving rock production from this French ballet dancer, choreographer and (powerful) vocalist. A sure shot for rock programmers with its dramatic build up and hypnotic guitars". Jerry Smith of Music Week considered Patti as "the modern Piaf" who "delivers a fine and very sitinctive, warbling rendition" on this song.

== Music video ==
The video clip, in which Patti carries out a striptease in front of some men, was censored on several French TV channels (except Canal +) and on MTV Europe, and only broadcast in the evening.

== Chart performance and awards ==
"Étienne" won the Vincent Scotto prize in 1987 and was certified Gold Disc in 1988 by the French certifier, the Syndicat National de l'Édition Phonographique. It entered the French top 50 Singles Chart on 14 November 1987 at number 24, peaked at number one for the five chart editions of January, before being replaced at this position by Sabrina's hit "Boys (Summertime Love)", then remained on the chart for 23 weeks. Other countries where it was a top ten hit include Italy (number one), Switzerland (number three) and Austria (number six). On the European Hot 100 Singles, it debuted at number 67 on 14 November 1987, peaked for two weeks at number three, and remained on the chart for a total of 27 weeks, eight of them in the top ten. Much played on radio, it charted for ten weeks on the European Ariplay Top 50, with a peak at number eight in its seventh week.

== Cover versions ==
"Étienne" was performed by Brigitte Fortin, Laurent's mother, in the French TV reality show "Mon Incroyable Fiancé". It was also covered by Quentin Mosimann, winner of Star Academy 7, in a swing version, on his debut album Duel. In 2022, Afida Turner released her cover version as single.

== Track listings ==
- 7" single
1. "Étienne" — 4:09
2. "Un Espoir" — 4:00
- 12" maxi
1. "Étienne" (remix club) — 5:39
2. "Étienne" (original version) — 4:09
3. "Étienne" (English version) — 4:09
- 12" maxi - U.S.
1. "Étienne" (12" vocal) — 6:55
2. "Étienne" (a cappella) — 4:12
3. "Étienne" (album cut) — 4:14
4. "Étienne" (instrumental) — 4:26

== Charts ==
=== Weekly charts ===
Weekly chart performance for "Étienne"
Chart (1987–1988)	Peak position
Austria (Ö3 Austria Top 40)	6
Belgium (Ultratop 50 Flanders)	18
Europe (European Airplay Top 50)	8
Europe (European Hot 100)	3
France (SNEP)	1
Germany (Official German Charts)	9
Italy (Musica e dischi)	1
Italy Airplay (Music & Media)	13
Netherlands (Single Top 100)	29
Switzerland (Schweizer Hitparade)	3

=== Year-end charts ===
Year-end chart performance for "Étienne"
Chart (1988)	Position
Austrian Singles Chart	18
Europe (European Hot 100)	29
Germany (Official German Charts)	70
Italy (Musica e dischi)	6
Switzerland (Schweizer Hitparade)	24

1985–1989 chart performance for "Étienne"
Chart (1985–1989)	Position
Europe (European Hot 100 Singles)	75

== Certifications ==
Certifications for "Étienne"
Region	Certification	Certified units/sales
France (SNEP)	Gold	500,000^{*}
^{*} Sales figures based on certification alone.

== See also ==
- List of number-one singles of 1988 (France)
