= Zhou Heping =

National Librarian of China (born 1949)

周和平 (Zhou Heping)
- Born: 1949 (age 76–77); Hebei Province, China
- Occupation: National Library of China
- Known for: Chinese librarian

Zhou Heping (Chinese: 周和平; pinyin: Zhōn Hépíng; born Hebei Province, China 1949) is the Honorary Director of the National Library of China.

== Career ==
- January 2014- : Honorary Director, National Library of China
- December 2009-January 2014: Director-General, National Library of China
- March 2001-February 2010: Vice-Minister of Culture, People's Republic of China
- January 1995-November 2001: Executive Deputy Director, National Library of China

== Titles in professional organizations ==
- April 2010-January 2014 : Director of the National Center for Ancient Book Preservation
- July 2006- : Honorary Chairman of the Library Society of China
