= Mary LeCocq =

American politician (1895–1991)

Member of the Washington House of Representatives from the 41st district
- In office 1952–1954

Personal details
- Born: July 7, 1895 Belmond, Iowa
- Died: February 6, 1991 (aged 95) Bellingham, Washington
- Party: Republican

Mary LeCocq (July 7, 1895 – February 6, 1991) was an American politician. She was a Republican, representing District 41 in the Washington House of Representatives which included parts of Whatcom County, from 1952 to 1954.
