= Censorship of Japanese media in South Korea =

Censorship of Japanese media in South Korea (Korean: 일본 대중문화 규제, restrictions on Japanese popular culture) refers to laws created by the government of South Korea to prevent the import and distribution of media from Japan. These laws were a reaction to the decades-long Japanese occupation of Korea. As a result, South Koreans had no legal access to Japanese media until the 1990s, except for animated shows or manga. All censorship of Japanese culture was abolished by the end of 2022. As of 2026, there are no legal restrictions on Japanese culture in South Korea.

== Origins ==
Immediately following the end of the Japanese rule of Korea, on August 15, 1945, South Korea enacted the Anti-National Behavior Punishment Act (반민족행위처벌법), later revised in 1948, in order to prevent their citizens from associating with anything Japanese related. This was followed with many other laws over the decades restricting the broadcast and distribution of records, videos, CDs, and games from outside the country. While the laws did not specify any specific country, the intent of the laws was primarily aimed at Japanese media.

== Anti-National Behavior Punishment Act (반민족행위처벌법) ==
- Chapter 1 – Sin
  - Article 1 – A person who actively cooperates in the Korea-Japan annexation in conspiracy with the Japanese government, or a person who signs a treaty or document that infringes on the sovereignty of Korea or conspiracy to conspire, shall be punished by death or life imprisonment, and all or half of his or her property and inheritance shall be confiscated.
  - Article 2 – A person who has been deprived of power by the Japanese Government or who has become a member of the Imperial Diet of Japan shall be punished by imprisonment for life or for no less than five years, and all or at least half of his/her property and inheritance shall be confiscated.
  - Article 3 – A person who kills and persecutes a movement for independence under Japanese rule or his/her family maliciously, or a person who leads it, shall be punished by death, life imprisonment, or imprisonment with labor for no less than five years, and all or part of his/her property hall be confiscated.
  - Article 4 – A person who falls under any of the subparagraphs of Article 4 may be punished by imprisonment with labor for not more than 10 years or by suspension of civil rights for not more than 15 years, and all or part of his/her property may be confiscated.
    1. Persons involved in wetwork
    2. Vice-chairman of the Central Committee, a person who has been an advisor or has been interrogated
    3. Persons who have been managed by a statutory officer or higher
    4. A person who obstructed the independence movement through espionage
    5. A person who has organized an organization for the purpose of obstructing independence or has been active as the head of the organization
    6. A person who inflicted harm on the nation through a vicious act as an official of the military or police
    7. A person responsible for the munitions industry, such as airplanes, weapons, or ammunition
    8. A person who has served as a member of a council or resolution body of a province or department and has a marked anti-national crime by flattering the schedule
    9. A person who used to be a government official and who abused his or her position to inflict harm on the nation with a marked, vicious crime
    10. A person who has taken vicious leadership actions as the head of the headquarters of each organization established for the purpose of promoting Japanese national policies
    11. A person who betrayed the national spirit and belief in religion, society, culture, economy, and other fields, and led by vicious anti-ethnic media, writing and other methods to cooperate in the implementation of Japanese aggressionism and its policies
    12. A person who inflicted harm on the nation by flattery against the Japanese colonial rule through vicious acts as an individual
  - Article 5 – A person who has received a rank of 3 or higher as a high-ranking officer or a rank of 5 or higher under Japanese rule, or who has served as a military police officer, assistant military police officer, or high-ranking police officer may not be appointed as a public official before the expiration of the statute of limitations of this Act. However, technical officers are excluded.
  - Article 6 - A person who commits a crime stipulated in this Act A person who is in a remarkable state of war may have the punishment reduced or exempted.
  - Article 7 – A person who makes a false report, perjury, or destruction of evidence in relation to a crime stipulated in this Act for the purpose of instigating others or defending a criminal, or a person who assists a criminal in the way of escape punished with
  - Article 8 - A person who commits a crime stipulated in this Act and organizes an organization shall be punished by imprisonment with labor for not more than one year.
- Chapter 2 Special Investigation Committee
  - Article 9 -
    1. A special investigation committee is established to preliminarily investigate acts of anti-nationalism.
    2. The Special Investigation Committee shall be composed of 10 members.
    3. The National Assembly elects members of the Special Investigation Committee from among the members of the National Assembly.
      - A person who has a history of independence movement or who has a strong sense of patriotism
      - Those who have zeal for patriotism, and who have learning and virtue
    4. When the National Assembly deems that the handling of the Special Investigation Committee violates this Act, it may resolve to distrust and re-elect the Special Investigation Committee. <Newly established 1948. 12. 7.>
  - Article 10 - The Special Investigation Committee elects a chairperson and one vice-chairperson each. The chairperson represents the investigation committee and chairs the meeting. The vice chairperson assists the chairperson and acts on behalf of the chairperson in case of an accident.
  - Article 11 - No members of the Special Investigation Committee shall be arrested and interrogated without the approval of the Chairman of the Special Investigation Committee, except for current offenders, during their tenure.
  - Article 12 -
    1. The Special Investigation Committee may establish investigation divisions in the Seoul Metropolitan Government and each district, and investigation branches in the military in order to share its affairs.
    2. The person in charge of the investigation department shall be elected by the investigation committee and obtain approval from the National Assembly.
    3. The Special Investigation Committee and the Angle Investigation Department shall publish the investigation documents whenever there is a request of a member of the National Assembly in order to ensure the fairness of the maritime affairs. <Newly established 1948. 12. 7.>
  - Article 13 - The staff hired by the Special Investigation Committee must be those who do not have a reputation for being pro-Japanese.
  - Article 14 - Investigation methods shall be of two types: document investigation and field investigation. Document investigation prepares a list of suspects by examining government documents, newspapers and other publications. The field investigation is based on the list of suspects, and evidence is collected by field trips or other appropriate methods to prepare an investigation report.
  - Article 15 -
    1. When the Special Investigation Committee requests the government or other agencies to submit necessary report records or to cooperate with them in order to carry out investigation affairs, it shall comply with such request.
    2. The special investigator may command and order judicial police officers as necessary for the investigation. <Newly established 1948. 12. 7.>
  - Article 16 - When the Special Investigation Commissioner performs his/her duties, he/she shall have the credentials of the Chairman of the Special Investigation Committee and shall have the privilege of retaining his/her freedom of action.
  - Article 17 - When the Special Investigation Committee completes an investigation, it must prepare an investigation report by the resolution of the Committee within 10 days and submit it to the Special Prosecutor's Office with a written opinion.
  - Article 18 - The expenses of the Special Investigation Committee shall be borne by the State Treasury.
- CHAPTER III – COMPOSITION AND PROCEDURE OF SPECIAL TRIAL
  - Article 19 - In order to punish the criminals stipulated in this Act, a special tribunal is assigned to the Supreme Court. The special tribunal that punishes acts of anti-nationalism is composed of one head of the special tribunal, three chief judges, and 12 judges elected by the National Assembly. The number of judges referred to in the preceding paragraph shall be 5 from among the National Assembly members, 6 from among judges or lawyers of the High Court or higher, and 5 from among members of the general public.
  - Article 20 - The Special Prosecutor's Office is juxtaposed to the Special Tribunal. The Special Prosecutor's Office is composed of one chief prosecutor, one deputy chief, and seven public prosecutors elected by the National Assembly.
  - Article 21 - Special judges and special prosecutors shall be elected from among those who have the qualifications of the seat.
    1. A lawyer who has experience in the independence movement or who has a strong sense of patriotism
    2. Those who have zeal for patriotism, and who have learning and virtue
  - Article 22 - The head of the special judicial branch and the special judge shall receive the same treatment and remuneration as the Chief Justice and judges, and the chief of the special prosecutor and the special prosecutor shall receive the same treatment and remuneration as the Prosecutor General and the public prosecutor.
  - Article 23 - Judges and public prosecutors of the Special Tribunal are guaranteed the same status as general judges and general public prosecutors during their tenure.
  - Article 24 - Judges and public prosecutors of the Special Tribunal shall not concurrently hold public offices other than members of the National Assembly, judges and prosecutors during their tenure, participate in for-profit institutions, or participate in political parties.
  - Article 25 - The special tribunal shall have three copies, and each division shall decide by agreement of one presiding judge and four judges.
  - Article 26 -
    1. The Special Prosecutor's Office shall institute a public prosecution based on the investigation report of the Special Investigation Committee and the facts of the general prosecutor. However, if the decision of the special prosecutor is deemed unjust, the special investigation committee may request reconsideration by consensus of all the special prosecutors. <Revised 1948. 12. 7.>
    2. The special prosecutor may, if necessary for the prosecution, commission the special investigator to conduct a re-investigation or command and order judicial police officers. <Revised 1948. 12. 7.>
  - Article 27 - The Special Prosecutor's Office shall prosecute within 20 days after receiving the investigation report of the Special Investigation Committee, and the Special Prosecutor's Office shall revise the trial within 30 days of the indicted case. However, the special tribunal may extend the period in unavoidable circumstances, but may not exceed 30 days.
  - Article 28 - Judgment under this Act shall be made on a single trial basis. The litigation procedure and execution of the sentence shall be governed by the General Criminal Procedure Act.
- Addendum <Act No. 3, 1948. 9. 22.>
  - Article 29 - The prescription of public prosecution for a crime stipulated in this Act is completed when two years have elapsed from the date of promulgation of this Act. However, for those who escaped, or those who reside or reside in areas where this Act has not been effectively enforced, the prescription will start from the time the cause ceases to exist.
  - Article 30 - The provisions of this Act apply to acts before and after the Korea-Japan annexation and before August 15, 4278 for a short period of time.
  - Article 31 - As a criminal stipulated in this Act, the sale, transfer, gift, and other legal acts of the property performed after the date of promulgation of the Constitution of the Republic of Korea shall be null and void.
  - Article 32 - This Act takes effect from the date of promulgation.
- Addendum <Act No. 13, 1948. 12. 7.>
  - This Act is a law that does not have any supplementary provisions at the time of promulgation, and takes effect 20 days after the date of promulgation according to the provisions of the Constitution.

== Revisions to the laws ==
With the emergence of Kim Dae-jung as president in 1998, he promised the gradual lifting of the 53-year-old ban on Japanese culture and signed a joint declaration with Prime Minister Keizo Obuchi. The gradual lift was separated into four stages. The lift was referred to as opening up to Japanese popular culture (Korean: 일본 대중문화 개방).

=== Partial liberalization ===
On 20 October 1998, manga and other publications were allowed to be imported for the first time. Films that were joint Japan–Korea productions, or had won an Academy Award or an award at a major international film festival (Cannes, Berlin or Venice), were also allowed to be screened in theatres, but not on television. Animated films continued to be banned.

=== Partial liberalization ===
On 10 September 1999, Japanese music was allowed to be performed in venues not exceeding 2000 seats, and non-animated films that had won an award at any international film festival were allowed to be shown. All Japanese movies that received awards from the events listed in stage one and received any international film festival award were allowed to be screened without censorship conditions. Other Japanese films that were not awarded were allowed to be screened to the extent that they had no censorship rating. Animated films continued to be banned.

=== Substantial liberalization ===
On 27 June 2000, the limit on seats in live performances was lifted, and animated feature-length theatrical films that had won one or more major international film awards were allowed to be shown, as were all films with a 12+ or 15+ rating. These films could also now be screened on cable and satellite television. Computer, online and arcade-style video games were allowed to be sold, and sporting events, news programs and documentaries were allowed to be broadcast on television. Music recordings and CDs with no Japanese lyrics, such as instrumental music or songs sung in other languages, was allowed to be sold.

=== Total liberalization ===
On 1 January 2004, all Japanese films were allowed to be shown in theaters, and all Japanese music and video games could be sold by retailers. For satellite and cable television, programming now allowed was lifestyle information programs, educational programs, Japanese music, Japanese films (those screening in theatres), and television dramas that were Japan–Korea productions or had a 7+, 12+ or general rating. For terrestrial television, allowed programming was lifestyle information programs, educational programs, non-animated Japanese films (those screening in theatres), television dramas that were Japan–Korea productions, live broadcasts of Japanese singers' concerts in South Korea, and Japanese singers appearing on Korean programs. The ban on animation was lifted completely on 1 January 2006.

== Laws remaining in place ==
It is still illegal to broadcast Japanese music and television dramas over terrestrial signals in South Korea.

In 2010, the Korean-language song "Udon" by Korean artists Kang Min Kyung & Son Dong Woon was banned for the use of a Japanese word for the title.

In February 2011, the Korean censor indicated that they might consider lifting the ban in the future. In August 2011, a single Japanese song was broadcast in South Korea as part of a trial program.

In 2014, the Korean-language song "Uh-ee" by Korean band Crayon Pop was banned from broadcast by KBS because it contained the Japanese word pikapika in its lyrics. However, SBS MTV and SBS funE allowed it.

== See also ==
- History of Japan–Korea relations
- Japan–South Korea relations
