= Guesch Patti =

French pop singer and songwriter (1946–2026)

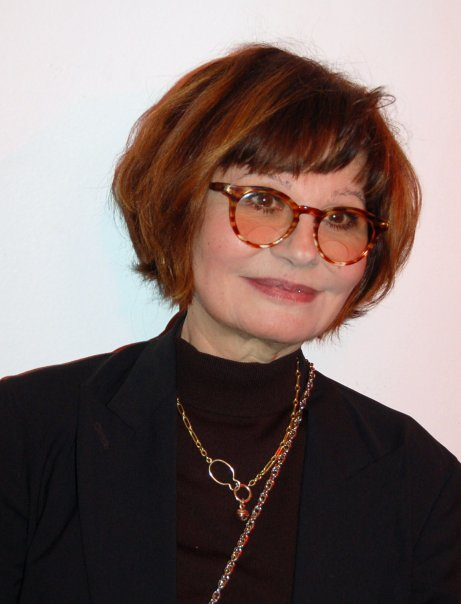
- Guesch Patti in 2009

Background information
- Born: Patricia Porrasse; 16 March 1946; Neuilly-sur-Seine, France
- Died: 22 June 2026 (aged 80) Paris, France
- Genre: Pop
- Occupations: Singer; songwriter
- Years active: 1955–2020

Patricia Porrasse (16 March 1946 – 22 June 2026), known professionally as Guesch Patti, was a French singer.

== Early life ==
Patti was born in Neuilly-sur-Seine, France on 16 March 1946. She chose her artist name, Guesch, from the nickname she had as a child. Patti is a nickname for Patricia.

She first started her career at dancing at age nine when she performed in a ballet at the Opéra National de Paris, working with Roland Petit, then at contemporary dance with Carolyn Carlson and Pina Bausch, and finally at variety dance on television.

== Music ==
After having accompanied the pianist Yves Gilbert, she decided to start a singing career and recorded two LPs in 1965 that were little noticed. In 1984, Patti participated in the trio named 'Dacapo', and had her first solo hit in 1987–1988 with "Étienne", which was certified gold disc in France. This song sold more than half a million copies and was ranked #1 in several countries, including France and Italy. Labyrinthe, released a short time after, was also successful: in 1988, it won a Victoire de la Musique in the category 'Female révélation of the year', which is awarded to best new artists. Another single, "Let Be Must the Queen", was a minor hit, peaking at #25 in France and #21 in Austria.

Her second album, entitled Nomades, was released in January 1990. In spite of a European tour and concerts performed in the US and Canada, the album was less successful than the previous. "L'Homme au tablier vert", "Comment dire" and "Nomades" were the three singles from the album, but were not charted.

Her third album, Gobe, released in 1992, was well-received by critics but considered a commercial failure.

In 1995, her next album, Blonde, strongly marked a musical shift and a more electronic experimentation, with less commercial sounds and new collaborations with many artists including Étienne Daho (on the song "Blonde") and Françoise Hardy ("Un peu, beaucoup"). There were three singles from this album: "La Marquise", "Blonde," and "Amnésie". In addition, the British filmmaker Peter Greenaway chose both "La Marquise" and "Blonde" for the soundtrack of his film The Pillow Book (1996).

The fifth album, Dernières Nouvelles, released in 2000, highlighted a painful and romance-drama ambiance, strongly tinged with loneliness. A DVD released in March 2002 completed the album. With much musical innovation, this DVD presents a large part of the album, containing choreographed performances and a false interview dealing with existential problems and the condition of the artist. The same year, Patti recorded a duet with Gonzales for the single entitled "Dans tes yeux".

== Theatre and film ==
Following the failure of these albums in the 1990s, Patti decided to abandon music and diversify her artistic experiences. She then continued her dancing career, especially with the show entitled Elle sourit aux larmes, presented at the Theatre des Abbesses in 2001 in which she performed dances from various contemporary choreographers including Odile Duboc, Daniel Larrieu and another specially written for her by Dominique Mercy.

Patti also appeared in films. She made a brief appearance in Claude Lelouch's film Une pour toutes, and also played in Elles, by Luis Galvao Teles, alongside Miou-Miou, Marthe Keller, Marisa Berenson and Carmen Maura. She continued to go on stage, with plays such as L'Opéra de quat'sous, Les Monologues du vagin and Jésus Camacho 404 284. During the summer of 2006, she was a member of the jury in Dancing Show, broadcast on France 2 in France.

== Death ==
Patti died in Paris on 22 June 2026, at the age of 80.

== Discography ==
=== Albums ===
- Labyrinthe (1988)
- Nomades (1990)
- Gobe (1992)
- Blonde (1995)
- Dernières nouvelles (2000)

=== Singles ===
- "Somnifères / Cogito" (with Dacapo) (1984)
- "Étienne" (1987)
- "Let be must the queen" (1988)
- "Cul Cul Clan" (1988)
- "Bon anniversaire" (1988)
- "L'homme au tablier vert" (1990)
- "Comment dire" (1990)
- "Nomade" (1990)
- "Wake up" (1992)
- "Mélomane" (1992)
- "La marquise" (1995)
- "Amnésie" (1995)
- "Blonde" (1996)
- "4+1" (including "Étienne" remix) (2000)
- "Dans tes yeux" (duet with Gonzales) (2002)
- "Bilingue" (2009)

== Music video collection ==
- "Dernières nouvelles" (2002)
