= Perdóname (Ricky Martin song) =

Single by Ricky Martin

from the album A Quien Quiera Escuchar
- Released: January 15, 2016
- Recorded: 2014
- Genre: Latin pop
- Length: 4:00
- Label: Sony Music Latin
- Songwriters: Ricky Martin; Yotuel Romero; Beatriz Luengo; Antonio Rayo
- Producer: Julio Reyes Copello

Ricky Martin singles chronology
"Que Se Sienta El Deseo" (2015)	"Perdóname" (2016)	"Vente Pa' Ca" (2016)

Music video
- "Perdóname" on YouTube

"Perdóname" (English: "Forgive Me") is a song recorded by Puerto Rican singer Ricky Martin from his tenth studio album A Quien Quiera Escuchar (2015). It was released on January 15, 2016, as the fourth single from the album through Sony Music Latin. It was written by Martin, Yotuel Romero, Beatriz Luengo and Antonio Rayo, and produced by Julio Reyes Copello. "Perdóname" is a ballad with lyrics focused on admitting the protagonist's mistakes and asking for forgiveness from his love interest. Music critics were positive towards the song's heartfelt lyrics and instrumentation. A music video directed by Carlos Pérez premiered on February 11, 2016, consisting of scenes focusing on Martin singing the song and showcasing emotions.

== Background ==
"Perdóname" was written by Martin, Yotuel Romero, Beatriz Luengo and Antonio Rayo, and produced by Julio Reyes Copello. About the song's concept, Martin said in a statement, "We are human beings and we make mistakes... and what's most important is to be able to say 'forgive me'... There are times when we get carried away by the moment, by passion and by enthusiasm, and we end up hurting someone. I'm only human and I accept that. What matters is looking that person in the eye and saying: 'I'm wrong and I am sorry. It wasn't my intention, please forgive me.'" The song was sent to radios on January 15, 2016. An urban version featuring Puerto Rican singer Farruko was released digitally on April 15, 2016. Musically, "Perdóname" is a ballad complete with guitars and strings. Lyrically, it deals with subjects of forgiveness as the title itself suggests. It finds the protagonist confessing his regret due to an unintentional committed betrayal towards a loved person; he clarifies that there is a lack of love from his side and suggests to finish things and move on rather than perpetuate a lie.

== Reception ==
Jessica Lucia Roiz of Latin Times deemed the song "powerful" and added that its subject is conveyed "in an honest and poetic way". She further described it as "sincere and heartfelt". Pip Ellwood-Hughes of Entertainment Focus was very positive of the song saying that Martin was "giving one of his best vocals to date". Eliezer Ríos Camacho, a journalist of the newspaper El Nuevo Día wrote that "Perdóname" was another song with a "radial success profile" from A Quien Quiera Escuchar. Renowned for Sound's Marcus Floyd praised the song's "beautiful" melody and its instrumentation. A Telecinco writer opined that "Perdóname" was a song likely to lead the charts in the summer of 2016. It was further concluded that the song was one of the most "touching" on the whole album.

On the Billboard chart issue dated January 30, 2016, "Perdóname" debuted at number forty-six on the Hot Latin Songs chart, number twenty-three on Latin Pop Airplay, and at number thirty-nine on Latin Airplay. Later, it went up to number twenty-five on Hot Latin Songs, number four on Latin Pop Airplay, and number fifteen on Latin Airplay. So far, "Perdóname" also reached numbers three and twenty-six on the Mexico Espanol Airplay and Mexico Airplay charts respectively.

== Music video ==
The music video for "Perdóname" was directed by Carlos Pérez and shot in December 2015 in Miami. According to a press release it was imagined as a short film that is meant to showcase different feelings through "avant-garde and complex" images in a way different from the singer's usual clips. A short snippet of the clip was released on February 10, 2016. It later premiered on the Spanish-language program Primer Impacto broadcast through Univision on February 11, 2016, and was uploaded to Martin's Vevo channel shortly after that. The video contains scenes showing Martin singing the song's lyrics under rain and in a room surrounded by flames. It is predominantly shot in red, blue and black-colored lighting. A writer of Billboard praised the video and wrote that it "shows a new side of Martin, portraying the powerful message of 'Perdóname' using complex and innovative images". Eliana Lopez of Variety Latino felt that the singer appeared "completely regretful". She further applauded Martin's look, saying that he looks "flawless in every shot". A Telecinco writer described the clip as a "torrent of emotions". Milly Contreras of the Latin Post noted how the video had a "darker theme" and how its "visuals and an emotional Martin add to the songs [sic] sorrowful theme of asking for forgiveness".

== Track listing ==
Digital download
No.	Title	Length
1.	"Perdóname"	4:00

Digital single
No.	Title	Length
1.	"Perdóname" (Urban Version featuring Farruko)	3:07

== Charts ==
=== Weekly charts ===
Chart (2016)	Peak position
Argentina (Monitor Latino)	12
Mexico (Billboard Mexican Airplay)	26
US Hot Latin Songs (Billboard)	25
US Latin Airplay (Billboard)	15
US Latin Pop Airplay (Billboard)	4
Venezuela (National-Report)	62

=== Year-end charts ===
Chart (2016)	Position
Argentina (Monitor Latino)	74
US Latin Pop Songs (Billboard)	27

== Certifications and sales ==
Region	Certification	Certified units/sales
Mexico (AMPROFON)	Platinum	60,000^{‡}
^{‡} Sales+streaming figures based on certification alone.
