= List of number-one Billboard Latin Pop Airplay songs of 2015 =

The Billboard Latin Pop Airplay is a chart that ranks the best-performing Spanish-language Pop music singles of the United States. Published by Billboard magazine, the data are compiled by Nielsen SoundScan based collectively on each single's weekly airplay.

== Chart history ==
Issue date	Song	Artist	Ref
January 3	"Bailando"	Enrique Iglesias featuring Descemer Bueno & Gente De Zona	
January 10	"Bailando"	Enrique Iglesias featuring Descemer Bueno & Gente De Zona	
January 17	"Bailando"	Enrique Iglesias featuring Descemer Bueno & Gente De Zona	
January 24	"Ay Vamos"	J Balvin	
January 31	"Ay Vamos"	J Balvin	
February 7	"Ay Vamos"	J Balvin	
February 14	"Me Vuelvo Un Cobarde"	Christian Daniel	
February 21	"Me Vuelvo Un Cobarde"	Christian Daniel	
February 28	"Disparo al Corazón"	Ricky Martin	
March 7	"Disparo al Corazón"	Ricky Martin	
March 14	"Disparo al Corazón"	Ricky Martin	
March 21	"Me Vuelvo Un Cobarde"	Christian Daniel	
March 28	"Disparo al Corazón"	Ricky Martin	
April 4	"Mi Verdad"	Maná featuring Shakira	
April 11	"Mi Verdad"	Maná featuring Shakira	
April 18	"Juntos (Together)"	Juanes	
April 25	"Mi Verdad"	Maná featuring Shakira	
May 2	"Mi Verdad"	Maná featuring Shakira	
May 9	"Mi Verdad"	Maná featuring Shakira	
May 16	"El Perdón"	Nicky Jam & Enrique Igleasias	
May 23	"Mi Verdad"	Maná featuring Shakira	
May 30	"El Perdón"	Nicky Jam & Enrique Igleasias	
June 6	"El Perdón"	Nicky Jam & Enrique Igleasias	
June 13	"El Perdón"	Nicky Jam & Enrique Igleasias	
June 20	"El Perdón"	Nicky Jam & Enrique Igleasias	
June 27	"El Perdón"	Nicky Jam & Enrique Igleasias	
July 4	"El Perdón"	Nicky Jam & Enrique Igleasias	
July 11	"El Perdón"	Nicky Jam & Enrique Igleasias	
July 18	"El Perdón"	Nicky Jam & Enrique Igleasias	
July 25	"El Perdón"	Nicky Jam & Enrique Igleasias	
August 1	"El Perdón"	Nicky Jam & Enrique Igleasias	
August 8	"El Perdón"	Nicky Jam & Enrique Igleasias	
August 15	"El Perdón"	Nicky Jam & Enrique Igleasias	
August 22	"El Perdón"	Nicky Jam & Enrique Igleasias	
August 29	"La Prisión"	Maná	
September 5	"La Mordidita"	Ricky Martin featuring Yotuel	
September 12	"Ginza"	J Balvin	
September 19	"Ginza"	J Balvin	
September 26	"Ginza"	J Balvin	
October 3	"Ginza"	J Balvin	
October 10	"Ginza"	J Balvin	
October 17	"Ginza"	J Balvin	
October 24	"Ginza"	J Balvin	
October 31	"Ginza"	J Balvin	
November 7	"Ginza"	J Balvin	
November 14	"Ginza"	J Balvin	
November 21	"Ginza"	J Balvin	
November 28	"Ginza"	J Balvin	
December 5	"Ginza"	J Balvin	
December 12	"Ginza"	J Balvin	
December 19	"Ginza"	J Balvin	
December 26	"Ginza"	J Balvin	
