= Perdón =

Single by Camila featuring Ricky Martin

from the album Elypse
- Released: December 16, 2014
- Genre: Latin pop
- Length: 5:07
- Label: Sony Music Mexico
- Songwriters: Mario Domm; Mónica Vélez
- Producer: Alexander "AC" Castillo Vásquez

Camila singles chronology
"Decidiste dejarme" (2014)	"Perdón" (2014)	"De Venus" (2014)

Ricky Martin singles chronology
"Adiós" (2014)	"Perdón" (2014)	"Disparo al Corazón" (2015)

"Perdón" (transl. "Sorry") is a song by Mexican band Camila from their 2014 album, Elypse. It was released as a single in May 2014 and peaked on the US Hot Latin Songs at number 16 and on the Mexican Airplay chart at number four. On December 16, 2014, "Perdón" featuring Puerto Rican singer Ricky Martin was released as a digital single.

== Music video ==
The music video for "Perdón" was released on YouTube on September 2, 2014.

== Credits and personnel ==
Credits adapted from Allmusic.

- Michael Bland – Bateria
- Camila – Primary Artist
- Mario Domm – Composer, Coros, Piano, Sintetizador
- Ginés Carrión Espí – Score Preparation
- Paul Forat – A&R
- Josh Freese – Bateria
- Ian Shelly Holmes – Coros
- Carlos Murguía – Composer, Hammond B3, Piano
- Rodrigo Ortega – Bateria
- Carola Rosas – Coros
- Mónica Vélez – Composer

== Track listing ==
Digital single
No.	Title	Length
1.	"Perdón"	5:07

== Charts ==
=== Weekly charts ===
Chart performance of "Perdón" Camila only version
Chart (2014)	Peak position
Dominican Republic Pop (Monitor Latino)	6
Mexico (Billboard Mexican Airplay)	4
US Hot Latin Songs (Billboard)	16
US Latin Airplay (Billboard)	24
US Latin Pop Airplay (Billboard)	8

=== Year-end charts ===
Year-end chart performance of "Perdón" Camila only version
Chart (2014)	Position
US Hot Latin Songs (Billboard)	84

== Certifications ==
Certifications for "Perdón"
Region	Certification	Certified units/sales
Mexico (AMPROFON)	Diamond+Platinum	360,000^{‡}
^{‡} Sales+streaming figures based on certification alone.
