= A Quien Quiera Escuchar =

2015 studio album by Ricky Martin

Studio album by Ricky Martin
- Released: February 10, 2015
- Recorded: 2014
- Genre: Latin pop
- Length: 37:31
- Label: Sony Latin
- Producers: Jesse Shatkin; Yotuel Romero; Antonio Rayo; Julio Reyes Copello; David Cabrera; Enrique Larreal

Ricky Martin chronology
Greatest Hits: Souvenir Edition (2013)	A Quien Quiera Escuchar (2015)	Esencial (2018)

Singles from A Quien Quiera Escuchar
- 1. "Adiós" Released: September 23, 2014; 2. "Disparo al Corazón" Released: January 12, 2015; 3. "La Mordidita" Released: April 21, 2015; 4. "Perdóname" Released: January 15, 2016

A Quien Quiera Escuchar (transl. "To Whomever that Wants to Listen") is the sixth Spanish album and tenth studio album by Puerto Rican singer Ricky Martin. It was released on February 10, 2015, through Sony Music Latin. It won the Grammy Award for Best Latin Pop Album at the 58th Annual Grammy Awards.

== Background ==
Martin's ninth studio album, Música + Alma + Sexo was released by Sony Music Latin in February 2011. It peaked at number three on the United States Billboard 200 and received a platinum certification in the Latin field by the Recording Industry Association of America (RIAA), indicating shipments of over 100,000 copies in the country. In the following years, Martin was chosen to be a coach on The Voice in Australia; while being part of the show, he released Greatest Hits: Souvenir Edition (2013) and embarked on Ricky Martin Live tour in the country. Additionally, he released several singles including "Adrenalina", a collaboration with Wisin and Jennifer Lopez, and "Vida" included in the One Love, One Rhythm – The 2014 FIFA World Cup Official Album.

In late December 2014, using his social network sites, in a video, Martin revealed that the name of the album is going to be A Quien Quiera Escuchar and that it will be released on February 10, 2015, "We're going to have a very interesting year full of music, partying and romantic times". In another video he unveiled the track list for the record while writing the names of the songs on a paper.

== Singles ==
"Adiós" was released as the lead single from A Quien Quiera Escuchar. It premiered on September 22, 2014, on Uforia's radio stations in the United States and Puerto Rico and was released to digital retailers on September 23 in three versions, Spanish, English and English-French. "Adiós" is a world music-flavored song with a length of three minutes and fifty-eight seconds. The single features "original sound" and influences from throughout different parts of the world in which Martin traveled in 2014. Reviewer Haley Longman of OK! praised Martin's multilingualism and wrote that with "Adiós" he transformed it in a song form. The single debuted at number 22 on the US Billboard Hot Latin Songs chart becoming his 41st entry on the chart. Following Martin's performance at the 15th Annual Latin Grammy Awards, "Adiós" jumped from number 16 to number nine on the Hot Latin Songs chart and became the singer's 24th top-ten single on the chart. With that feat, it pushed Martin ahead of singer Gloria Estefan on the list of acts with the most top-ten hits on the chart.

"Disparo al Corazón" was released on January 13, 2015, as the second single from the album. On January 19, 2015, "Disparo al Corazón" debuted at number thirty-four on the US Latin Airplay chart and at number nineteen on Latin Pop Airplay. Martin extended his lead for most top twenty hits on the Latin Pop Airplay to forty (followed by Enrique Iglesias with thirty-six). "Disparo al Corazón" also debuted at number thirty-five on Hot Latin Songs becoming Martin's forty-second hit on the chart. Additionally, the song opened at number seven on the US Latin Pop Digital Songs. Two weeks later, "Disparo al Corazón" also debuted at number twenty-three on the Tropical Songs chart. On February 16, 2015, "Disparo al Corazón" topped Latin Pop Airplay. So far, it spent four consecutive weeks at the top. The song also reached a new peak on Hot Latin Songs, climbing to number nine in its fifth week. On March 2, 2015, Martin earned his fourteenth Latin Airplay number one with "Disparo al Corazón." In the chart's history, only Enrique Iglesias boasted more leaders (twenty-six), and Gloria Estefan ranks third with eleven number ones. Eventually, "Disparo al Corazón" peaked at number nine on the US Hot Latin Songs chart, number one on Latin Airplay and number twenty on Latin Digital Songs.

The third single, "La Mordidita", was released on April 21, 2015. Following the release of the album in February 2015, "La Mordidita" debuted at number seventeen on the Billboard's US Latin Digital Songs chart, with 2,000 digital downloads sold. In May 2015, Martin extended his record for the most top twenty singles on Latin Pop Airplay, when "La Mordidita" jumped 40–20 on this chart. In mid-August 2015, "La Mordidita" earned Martin his twenty-sixth top ten hit on Hot Latin Songs. He became the fourth artist with the most top tens in the 29-year history of the chart. In late August 2015, Martin earned with "La Mordidita" his fifteenth number-one on the Latin Airplay chart (up 58 percent, to 11.8 million audience impressions). Eventually, "La Mordidita" peaked at number six on the US Hot Latin Songs chart, number one on Latin Airplay and number seven on Latin Digital Songs. It also reached number one on Latin Pop Airplay, number two on Latin Pop Digital Songs, and number twenty-six on Tropical Songs. On the 2015 Billboard Year-End charts, "La Mordidita" reached number nine on Latin Pop Songs, number twenty on Latin Airplay, number twenty-three on Hot Latin Songs, and number thirty-two on Latin Digital Songs. In Spain, the song reached a peak position of number three and was later certified Platinum.

"Perdóname" was released to radio stations as the fourth single from the album on January 15, 2016. It was announced on his Facebook page the same day.

== Commercial performance ==
A Quien Quiera Escuchar debuted at number 20 on the US Billboard 200 chart and sold 25,000 copies in its first week. Subsequently, it debuted at number one on the US Top Latin Albums, earning Martin his sixth album to rocket to the top of the chart. It also debuted at number one on the US Latin Pop Albums chart.

== Critical reception ==
Professional ratings
Review scores
Source	Rating
AllMusic	4/5 stars
The Herald-Standard	positive
El Nuevo Día	positive
Renowned for Sound	4.5/5 stars
Yahoo! GMA	3.5/5 stars
Evigshed Mag	(9.1/10)
Previamente	3/5 stars

A Quien Quiera Escuchar received positive reviews from music critics. Clint Rhodes of The Herald-Standard gave the album a positive review and praised its composition and lyrics about love naming it "deliciously drenched in infectious dance-floor beats and sizzling sex appeal with touches of vulnerability, passion and blissfulness." According to Allan Raible of Yahoo! for GMA "this is not an album that rests on the easy clichés. This is Latin pop done well with an equal eye on instrumentation and spectacle." The album earned Martin a nomination for Best Contemporary Pop Vocal Album at the 16th Latin Grammy Awards.

== Awards and nominations ==
Year	Ceremony	Award	Result	Ref.
2015	Latin American Music Awards	Album of the Year	Won	
2015	Latin Grammy Awards	Best Contemporary Pop Vocal Album	Nominated	
2015	American Music Awards	Favorite Latin Artist	Nominated	
2015	Latin Music Italian Awards	Best Latin Male Album of The Year	Nominated	
2016	Grammy Awards	Best Latin Pop Album	Won	
2016	Lo Nuestro Awards	Pop/Rock Album of the Year	Won	
2016	GLAAD Media Awards	Outstanding Music Artist (Spanish-Language)	Won	
2016	Billboard Latin Music Awards	Top Latin Album of the Year	Nominated	
2016	Billboard Latin Music Awards	Latin Pop Album of the Year	Nominated	

== Track listing ==
No.	Title	Writer(s)	Producer(s)	Length
1.	"Adiós"	Ricky Martin; Yotuel Romero; Antonio Rayo	Rayo; Jesse Shatkin; Romero; David Cabrera^{[a]}; Enrique Larreal^{[a]}	4:00
2.	"Disparo al Corazón"	Martin; Pedro Capó; Yoel Henriquez; Rafael Esparza Ruiz	Julio Reyes Copello	3:50
3.	"Isla Bella"	Yomero; Beatriz Luengo; Omar Alfanno	Copello	4:55
4.	"Perdóname"	Martin; Yomero; Luengo; Rayo	Copello	4:00
5.	"Náufrago"	Martin; Yomero; Rayo	Copello; Rayo^{[a]}; Romero^{[a]}	3:26
6.	"La Mordidita" (featuring Yotuel)	Martin; Capó; José Gómez; Romero; Luengo	Rayo; Romero	3:31
7.	"Cuanto Me Acuerdo de Ti"	Martin; Yomero; Luengo; Rayo	Copello	3:31
8.	"Mátame Otra Vez"	Martin; Romero; Luengo; David Julca; Johnny Julca	Copello; Rayo^{[a]}; Romero^{[a]}	4:03
9.	"Nada"	Martin; Romero; Luengo; D. Julca; J. Julca	Copello; Rayo^{[a]}; Romero^{[a]}	3:25
10.	"A Quién Quiera Escuchar"	Jorge Ruiz Flores	Copello	4:10
Total length:				37:31

Deluxe Edition
No.	Title	Writer(s)	Producer(s)	Length
11.	"Náufrago" (Acoustic version)	Martin; Yomero; Rayo	Copello; Rayo^{[a]}; Romero^{[a]}	3:20
12.	"Mátame Otra Vez" (Acoustic version)	Martin; Romero; Luengo; David Julca; Johnny Julca	Copello; Rayo^{[a]}; Romero^{[a]}	4:02
13.	"Nada" (Dharmik version)	Martin; Romero; Luengo; D. Julca; J. Julca	Copello; Rayo^{[a]}; Romero^{[a]}	3:11
Total length:				48:04

Target Deluxe Edition with Exclusive Bonus Tracks
No.	Title	Writer(s)	Producer(s)	Length
11.	"Náufrago" (Acoustic version)	Martin; Yomero; Rayo	Copello; Rayo^{[a]}; Romero^{[a]}	3:20
12.	"Mátame Otra Vez" (Acoustic version)	Martin; Romero; Luengo; David Julca; Johnny Julca	Copello; Rayo^{[a]}; Romero^{[a]}	4:02
13.	"Nada" (Dharmik version)	Martin; Romero; Luengo; D. Julca; J. Julca	Copello; Rayo^{[a]}; Romero^{[a]}	3:11
14.	"Te Extraño, Te Olvido, Te Amo" (Live version)	Carlos Lara
15.	"Y Todo Queda en Nada/Fuego de Noche, Nieve de Día" (Live medley)	Estéfano; Carlos Reyes; Luis Gómez-Escolar; K. C. Porter; Ian Blake
16.	"A Medio Vivir" (Live version)	Franco de Vita

Notes

- ^{^a} signifies a vocal producer

== Charts ==
=== Weekly charts ===
Chart (2015)	Peak position
Argentine Albums (CAPIF)	1
Australian Albums (ARIA)	76
Belgian Albums (Ultratop Flanders)	121
Belgian Albums (Ultratop Wallonia)	97
Italian Albums (FIMI)	65
Mexican Albums (AMPROFON)	2
South American Albums (Prensario)	5
South Korean Albums (Gaon)	28
Spanish Albums (Promusicae)	3
Swiss Albums (Schweizer Hitparade)	49
Uruguayan Albums (CUD)	3
US Billboard 200	20
US Top Latin Albums (Billboard)	1
US Latin Pop Albums (Billboard)	1
Venezuelan Albums (Recordland)	4

=== Monthly charts ===
Chart (2015)	Position
Argentine Albums (CAPIF)	1

=== Year-end charts ===
Chart (2015)	Position
Argentine Albums (CAPIF)	2
Mexican Albums (AMPROFON)	29
Spanish Albums (PROMUSICAE)	47
US Top Latin Albums (Billboard)	3
US Latin Pop Albums (Billboard)	2

Chart (2016)	Position
US Top Latin Albums (Billboard)	71
US Latin Pop Albums (Billboard)	20

== Certifications ==
Region	Certification	Certified units/sales
Argentina (CAPIF)	2× Platinum	80,000^{^}
Chile (IFPI)	2× Platinum	30,000
Mexico (AMPROFON)	2× Platinum	120,000^{‡}
United States (RIAA)	Platinum (Latin)	60,000^{^}
Venezuela (APFV)	Gold	5,000
^{^} Shipments figures based on certification alone.^{‡} Sales+streaming figures based on certification alone.

== Release history ==
Region	Date	Label	Format	Catalog	Ref.
United Kingdom	February 9, 2015	Sony Music Latin	CD	88875053512	
Argentina	February 10, 2015	Sony Music Latin	CD	8887 505351-2	
Japan	February 11, 2015	Sony Music	CD	NEOIMP-10363	
Japan	February 11, 2015	Sony Music	CD	NEOIMP-10364	
Taiwan	February 13, 2015	Sony Music	CD	88875053502	
Taiwan	March 10, 2015	Sony Music	CD	88875053512	

== See also ==
- 2015 in Latin music
- Grammy Award for Best Latin Pop Album
- List of number-one Billboard Latin Albums from the 2010s
- List of number-one Billboard Latin Pop Albums from the 2010s
