= Jwan Yosef =

Swedish-Syrian painter and artist

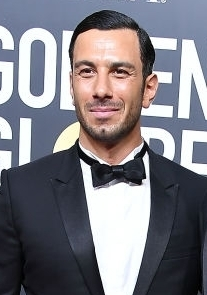
- Yosef at the 2018 Golden Globe Awards
- Born: 6 September 1984 (age 41); Ras al-Ayn, Al-Hasakah, Syria
- Occupations: Painter; artist
- Years active: 2011–present
- Spouse: Ricky Martin (m. 2017; sep. 2023)
- Children: 2

Jwan Yosef (born 6 September 1984) is a Syrian-Swedish painter and artist. He specializes in plastic arts and is based in London, England.

== Early life and education ==
Yosef was born in Syria, to a Kurdish father and an Armenian mother. His family emigrated to Sweden when he was two years old, and later he studied painting in Pernby School of Painting in Stockholm between 2004 and 2006, then moved to Konstfack University College of Arts, Crafts and Design, Stockholm.

== Career ==
Yosef has taken part in a great number of art fairs and group exhibitions. He held two solo exhibitions in 2013 titled Painting about Sex, Flesh and Violence, lol at the DIVUS Gallery in London and High Notes, at the Galleri Anna Thulin, Stockholm. He participated in the Threadneedle Prize exhibition in 2013 and the BEERS Contemporary Award for Emerging Art both in 2013. In 2015, he exhibited at Galleri Bon with group exhibition There and Back Again with fellow Konstfack graduates Josef Bull, Petr Davydtchenko and Natasja Loutchko. He is a founding member and studio holder at The Bomb Factory Art Foundation in Archway, North London.

== Personal life ==
In April 2016, during the amfAR, The Foundation for AIDS Research gala in São Paulo, Brazil, Yosef publicly announced that he had been in a relationship with Puerto Rican singer Ricky Martin. The couple married in 2017. On 31 December 2018, Martin and Yosef announced, via Instagram, the birth of their daughter, Lucia Martin-Yosef. On 29 October 2019, Martin and Yosef announced the birth of their son, Renn Martin-Yosef. In July 2023, it was announced that Martin and Yosef had separated after six years of marriage.
