= Adiós (Ricky Martin song) =

Ricky Martin song

Single by Ricky Martin

from the album A Quien Quiera Escuchar
- Language: Spanish; English; French
- English title: "Goodbye"
- Released: September 23, 2014
- Genre: World; EDM; dance
- Length: 4:00
- Label: Sony Latin
- Songwriters: Antonio Rayo Gibo; Ricky Martin; Yotuel Romero
- Producers: Romero; Jesse Shatkin; Rayo

Ricky Martin singles chronology
"Vida" (2014)	"Adiós" (2014)	"Perdón" (2014)

Music videos
- Adiós (Spanish/French) on YouTube
- Adiós (English Ver.) on YouTube

"Adiós" (transl. "Goodbye") is a song recorded by Puerto Rican singer Ricky Martin for his tenth studio album, A Quien Quiera Escuchar (2015). The song was written by Antonio Rayo Gibo, Martin, and Yotuel Romero, while the production was handled by Romero, Jesse Shatkin, and Rayo. It was released for digital download and streaming by Sony Music Latin on September 23, 2014, as the lead single from the album. The single contained Spanish/French, English, and English/French versions, and was accompanied by numerous remixes. An uptempo world music-flavored EDM song with elements of cumbia, tango, baile funk, Middle Eastern, Latin, and Caribbean, amongst others. it is about "how difficult it is to say sorry, to betray an oath, an anniversary without promises, without even a single kiss".

"Adiós" received widely positive reviews from music critics, who complimented its multilingualism and "catchy" melody. It was nominated for Best Latin Dance Track at the 31st International Dance Music Awards. The song was commercially successful, reaching number one in Colombia, as well as the top 10 in Mexico and Billboard's Hot Latin Songs, Latin Airplay, Latin Pop Airplay, and Latin Digital Song Sales in the United States. An accompanying music video, released on October 21, 2014, was directed by Ethan Ladder and filmed in Long Beach, California, the underground speakeasy Harvelle's. It depicts Martin playing five characters: a policeman, a bartender, a bouncer, a gangster, and a singer. To promote the song, he performed it on several television programs and award shows, including the 15th Annual Latin Grammy Awards.

== Background and release ==
On September 11, 2014, Ricky Martin announced that his new single, entitled "Adiós", would be released on September 23, 2014. He shared the artwork "bit by bit" on Facebook. One week later, Milenio confirmed that it is set to be the lead single from Martin's tenth studio album and would be premiered via Uforia radio stations in the United States and Puerto Rico, one day earlier than the song's original release date. On September 22, EFE revealed that the single contains three versions, "Spanish, English and English with some words in French". In a statement, Martin expressed:

We chose "Adiós" because it represents who I am today. The title is a reference to the opening of another cycle.

"Adiós" was released for digital download and streaming by Sony Music Latin on September 23, 2014. In the same year, a mambo remix of the song, featuring American singer Nicky Jam, was released on September 30, and a ranchera remix, featuring Julión Álvarez y Su Norteño Banda, was released on November 10. On November 24, two extended plays, titled Adiós (Dance Remixes) and Adiós (Flylife Remixes) were released, both including four remixes of the song. Another EP, containing the three original versions of "Adiós", as well as the mambo remix, was released on February 3, 2015. "Adiós" was included as the first track on Martin's tenth studio album, A Quien Quiera Escuchar, released February 10, 2015, while a Turkish version of the song, featuring Turkish singer Ayşe Hatun Önal was included as the eleventh track on the Turkish edition. "Adiós" was also later added to Martin's compilation album, Esencial (2018).

== Music and lyrics ==
"Adiós"
A 24-second sample of the Spanish-language version of the song, which contains an up-tempo melody and features both Spanish and French lyrics.

Musically, "Adiós" is an uptempo world music-flavored EDM song with elements of cumbia, flamenco, tango, baile funk, Middle Eastern, electronic, house, dance, burlesque, Latin, and Caribbean. The song features a multilingualism that is sung in Spanish, English, and French. It was written by Antonio Rayo Gibo, Martin, and Yotuel Romero, with its production being handled by Romero, Jesse Shatkin, and Rayo. The track "features an original sound and rhythmic influences from different parts of the world" and runs for a total of four minutes. Lyrically, "Adiós" which translates to "Goodbye", tells "how difficult it is to say sorry, to betray an oath, an anniversary without promises, without even a single kiss", with lyrics including: "Adiós / Te tengo que decir adiós / Me estoy volviendo loco /Loco, loco, loco, loco por tu amor" (Goodbye / I have to say goodbye / I'm going crazy / Crazy, crazy, crazy, crazy for your love).

== Critical reception ==
Professional ratings
Review scores
Source	Rating
musicserver.cz	7/10

Upon release, "Adiós" was met with widely positive reviews from music critics. Haley Longman of OK! praised Martin's multilingualism and wrote that with "Adiós" he transformed it in a song form. Mike Wass of the website Idolator noted how the song's release in various languages was due to Martin's worldwide stardom. He further found the singer in a "sedate mood", similar to "Michael Bublé with a very exotic twist" and was more in favor of the Spanish version, noting how its chorus and instrumental breakdown were its key parts. A writer of Radio Corazón labeled the track "a great song about Goodbye". Jaromír Koc from musicserver.cz described its melody as "catchy" and stated that "the song sounds really fresh and a hit on the first listen". Also, an author of El Espectador labeled the track "a catchy song".

=== Accolades ===
Cadena Dial ranked "Adiós" among the "7 songs to overcome the return to the routine" in 2019. The song was nominated for Best Latin Dance Track at the 31st International Dance Music Awards.

== Commercial performance ==
"Adiós" debuted at number 22 on the US Billboard Hot Latin Songs chart on October 11, 2014, becoming Martin's 41st entry on the chart. Additionally, it debuted at number two on the US Billboard Latin Digital Songs chart, with a first-week tally of 6,000 downloads sold. Following the singer's performance of the song at the 15th Annual Latin Grammy Awards, it climbed to number 9 on Hot Latin Songs November 23, 2014, giving Martin his 24th top-ten hit. Therefore, Martin broke away from a tie with Gloria Estefan for the sixth slot of most top 10s, coming behind Luis Miguel, Enrique Iglesias, Chayanne, Cristian Castro, and Marco Antonio Solís. "Adiós" also peaked at numbers four and five on Latin Pop Airplay and Latin Airplay, respectively.

Besides the United States, "Adiós" peaked at number one in Colombia and reached the top-five in Mexico. In 2017, it was certified platinum + gold by the Asociación Mexicana de Productores de Fonogramas y Videogramas (AMPROFON), for track-equivalent sales of over 90,000 units in Mexico. In Spain's official weekly chart, the song debuted at number 37 on September 28, 2014. It subsequently peaked at number 12 on the chart issue dated December 14, 2014, giving Martin his 18th top-20 hit in the country. "Adiós" has since become Martin's longest-charting solo hit in Spain, spending 25 weeks on the chart. The track was also certified gold by the Productores de Música de España (PROMUSICAE), for track-equivalent sales of over 20,000 units in the country.

== Promotion ==
=== Music videos ===
A screenshot from the music video, depicting Martin as a gangster.

On October 3, 2014, Martin shared a video of himself on the set of filming "Adiós" music video, announcing that the visual would be available on October 20, 2014. He exclusively premiered the video on Twitter on the specified date, and uploaded the music videos for both Spanish/French and English versions on his YouTube channel the following day. It was set in early-1930s Weimar Germany, filmed in Long Beach, California, the underground speakeasy Harvelle's, which opened its doors during Prohibition in 1931, and directed by Ethan Lader. Martin portrays five characters in the video: a policeman, a bartender, a bouncer, a gangster, and a singer. The visual also features several female cabaret dancers, lap dancing to a few men in the crowd. Martin stated about the early-1930s: "There is something about that era and the style that I love." Writing for his website, Andy Towle praised Martin's different roles for being "each more dashing than the next", while Sophie Schillaci from Entertainment Tonight described the video as "sexy" and "retro". As of September 2018, the Spanish/French version has received over 100 million views on YouTube.

=== Live performances ===
On November 20, 2014, Martin performed the song at the 15th Annual Latin Grammy Awards, along with "dancers in corsets and garter belts", doing Charleston dance moves. On February 1, 2015, he gave it a performance, surrounded by 40 contestants from the auditions of 2015 edition of the American reality television beauty pageant, Nuestra Belleza Latina. On February 10, 2015, he performed "Adiós", "Disparo al Corazón" and "Livin' la Vida Loca" on the Honda Stage at the iHeartRadio Theater. The following day, he performed the English version of "Adiós" on The Ellen DeGeneres Show. Kevin Apaza from Direct Lyrics praised Martin's "showmanship" and stated: "He killed it." One day later, he performed "Adiós", "Livin' la Vida Loca" and "The Cup of Life" on The Today Show. "Adiós" was included on the set lists for Martin's the One World Tour and the Ricky Martin en Concierto.

== Track listings ==
- Digital download and streaming
1. "Adiós" – 3:58
2. "Adiós" (English/French Version) – 3:58
3. "Adiós" (English Version) – 3:58
- Digital download and streaming – mambo remix
1. "Adiós" (feat. Nicky Jam) [Mambo Remix] – 3:52
- Digital download and streaming – ranchera remix
1. "Adiós" (Ranchera Remix) [feat. Julion Alvarez y Su Norteño Banda] – 3:51
- Digital download and streaming – dance remixes
1. "Adiós" (Supermatik Club Mix Extended) – 5:06
2. "Adiós" (Supermatik Club Mix Radio Edit) – 3:43
3. "Adiós" (Supermatik Mix Extended) – 5:08
4. "Adiós" (Supermatik Mix Radio Edit) – 3:44
- Digital download and streaming – Flylife remixes
1. "Adiós" (Danny Verde Remix) – 6:47
2. "Adiós" (Steven Redant Vocal Mix) – 6:43
3. "Adiós" (Steven Redant Remix) – 6:43
4. "Adiós" (DJ Riddler Remix) [English Version] – 5:18
- Digital download and streaming – EP
1. "Adiós" – 3:58
2. "Adiós" (English/French Version) – 3:58
3. "Adiós" (English Version) – 3:58
4. "Adiós" (feat. Nicky Jam) [Mambo Remix] – 3:52

== Credits and personnel ==
Credits adapted from Tidal.

- Ricky Martin – vocal, composer, lyricist, associated performer
- Antonio Rayo Gibo – composer, lyricist, producer, engineer, misc. prod., programmer
- Yotuel Romero – composer, lyricist, producer, engineer, misc. prod., programmer
- Jesse Shatkin – producer, engineer, programmer
- Isabel De Jesús – A&R coordinator
- Alex Gallardo – A&R coordinator
- Justin Hergert – assistant engineer
- Tom Coyne – mastering engineer
- Antonio Baglio – mastering engineer
- Enrique Larreal – misc. prod.
- David Cabrera – misc. prod.
- Tony Maserati – mixing engineer

== Charts ==
=== Weekly charts ===
Weekly peak performance for "Adiós"
Chart (2014)	Peak position
CIS Airplay (TopHit)	174
Colombia (National-Report)	1
Dominican Republic Pop (Monitor Latino)	2
Mexico (Billboard Mexican Airplay)	5
Mexico (Monitor Latino)	3
Spain (Promusicae)	12
US Hot Latin Songs (Billboard)	9
US Latin Airplay (Billboard)	5
US Latin Pop Airplay (Billboard)	4
Venezuela (Record Report)	72

=== Year-end charts ===
2014 year-end chart performance for "Adiós"
Chart (2014)	Position
US Hot Latin Songs (Billboard)	96

2015 year-end chart performance for "Adiós"
Chart (2015)	Position
Colombia Pop (Monitor Latino)	6
Dominican Republic Pop (Monitor Latino)	18
US Hot Latin Songs (Billboard)	86

2016 year-end chart performance for "Adiós"
Chart (2016)	Position
Panama Pop (Monitor Latino)	37
Venezuela Pop (Monitor Latino)	86

2017 year-end chart performance for "Adiós"
Chart (2017)	Position
Chile Pop (Monitor Latino)	75
Venezuela Pop (Monitor Latino)	99

== Certifications ==
Certifications and sales for "Adiós"
Region	Certification	Certified units/sales
Mexico (AMPROFON)	2× Platinum	120,000^{‡}
Spain (Promusicae)	Gold	20,000^{‡}
^{‡} Sales+streaming figures based on certification alone.

== Release history ==
Release dates and formats for "Adiós"
Region	Date	Format	Version	Label	Ref(s)
United States	September 22, 2014	Contemporary hit radio	Original	Sony Latin	
Various	September 23, 2014	Digital download; streaming	Original	Sony Latin	
Latin America	September 23, 2014	Contemporary hit radio	Original	Sony Latin	
Latin America	September 30, 2014	Digital download; streaming	Mambo Remix	Sony Latin	
Russia	September 30, 2014	Contemporary hit radio	Original	Sony Latin	
Italy	October 3, 2014	Contemporary hit radio	Original	Sony Latin	
Italy	October 8, 2014	Contemporary hit radio	Mambo Remix	Sony Latin	
Mexico	November 10, 2014	Digital download; streaming	Ranchera Remix	Sony Latin	
Various	November 24, 2014	Digital download; streaming	Dance Remixes	Sony Latin	
Various	November 24, 2014	Digital download; streaming	Flylife Remixes	Sony Latin	
Various	February 3, 2015	Digital download; streaming	EP	Sony Latin	

== See also ==
- List of number-one songs of 2014 in Mexico
- List of number-one songs of 2015 in Colombia
