= Disparo al Corazón =

Single by Ricky Martin

from the album A Quien Quiera Escuchar
- Released: January 13, 2015
- Recorded: 2014
- Genre: Latin pop; pop rock
- Length: 3:50
- Label: Sony Music Latin
- Songwriters: Ricky Martin; Pedro Capó; Yoel Henriquez; Rafael Esparza Ruiz
- Producer: Julio Reyes Copello

Ricky Martin singles chronology
"Perdón" (2014)	"Disparo al Corazón" (2015)	"Mr. Put It Down" (2015)

Music video
- "Disparo al Corazón" on YouTube

"Disparo al Corazón" (English: "Shot to the Heart") is a song recorded by Puerto Rican singer Ricky Martin, released on January 13, 2015, as the second single from his Grammy Award–winning Spanish-language album, A Quien Quiera Escuchar (2015). It was written by Ricky Martin, Pedro Capó, Yoel Henriquez and Rafael Esparza Ruiz, and produced by Julio Reyes Copello.

== Background and release ==
Martin started working on his tenth studio album in 2012. He released "Adiós" on September 23, 2014, as the lead single from the album, which was still untitled at the time. He revealed the album's title as A Quien Quiera Escuchar and track list in December 2014, with "Disparo al Corazón" being included as the second track. On January 8, 2015, it was announced that "Disparo al Corazón" would be a ballad and released to radio stations on January 12, 2015, as the second single from the album. The song was released for digital download and streaming by Sony Music Latin on January 13. During an interview with Billboard explained that the song was the favorite song of one his twin boys: "So maybe the boys influenced the choice of single." A remix featuring the Spanish producer Brian Cross was released simultaneously with the original song.

== Music and lyrics ==
Musically, "Disparo al Corazón" is a Spanish language soft country pop ballad, that uses several instruments including guitar, piano, banjo, violin, and drum. The song was written by Rafael Esparza-Ruiz, Yoel Henriquez, Pedro Capó, and Martin. The production was handled by Julio Reyes Copello, and the track runs for a total of 3 minutes and 50 seconds. Lyrically, "Disparo al Corazón" which translates to "Shot to the Heart", is a metaphor full of "sensitivity, delivery, and honesty". The lyrics begin with, "Aquí va mi confesión / Antes de ti no fui un santo / He pecado como no / Pero eso es cosa del pasado / Desde que llegaste tú lanzaste al aire la moneda" (Here goes my confession / Before you I was not a saint / I have sinned, why not? / But that's a thing of the past / Since you arrived, you flipped the coin).

== Critical reception ==
Upon release, "Disparo al Corazón" was met with widely positive reviews from music critics. In their review of the song, El Economista staff labeled Martin "one of the most admired artists on the world" and praised his "masterful interpretation" in the track. Andrew Le from Renowned for Sound described his vocals as "proficient". He highlighted "the unusually emotional instrumental ending, as the banjos, drums and strings lamentfully fade away into the distance" as the best part of the song. An author of ABC named the song "a full-fledged confession", stating that Martin "opened his heart and soul" in it. In 2020, MTV Argentina ranked it as one of the singer's best songs.

=== Accolades ===
"Disparo al Corazón" has received a number of awards and nominations. It was nominated for both Record of the Year and Song of the Year at the 16th Annual Latin Grammy Awards, but lost to "Hasta la Raíz" by Natalia Lafourcade in the categories.

Awards and nominations for "Disparo al Corazón"
Organization	Year	Award	Result	Ref.
Latin Grammy Awards	2015	Record of the Year	Nominated	
Latin Grammy Awards	2015	Song of the Year	Nominated	
Latin Music Italian Awards	2015	My Favorite Lyrics	Nominated	
ASCAP Latin Awards	2016	Pop Winning Song	Won	
Premios Lo Nuestro	2016	Pop Song of the Year	Won	
BMI Latin Awards	2017	Latin Publisher of the Year	Won	
BMI Latin Awards	2017	Award Winning Songs	Won	

== Commercial performance ==
On January 19, 2015, "Disparo al Corazón" debuted at number thirty-four on the US Latin Airplay chart and at number nineteen on Latin Pop Airplay. Martin extended his lead for most top twenty hits on the Latin Pop Airplay to forty (followed by Enrique Iglesias with thirty-six). "Disparo al Corazón" also debuted at number thirty-five on Hot Latin Songs becoming Martin's forty-second hit on the chart. Additionally, the song opened at number seven on the US Latin Pop Digital Songs. Two weeks later, "Disparo al Corazón" also debuted at number twenty-three on the Tropical Songs chart. On February 16, 2015, "Disparo al Corazón" topped Latin Pop Airplay. So far, it spent four consecutive weeks at the top. The song also reached a new peak on Hot Latin Songs, climbing to number nine in its fifth week. On March 2, 2015, Martin earned his fourteenth Latin Airplay number one with "Disparo al Corazón." In the chart's history, only Enrique Iglesias boasted more leaders (twenty-six), and Gloria Estefan ranks third with eleven number ones.

Eventually, "Disparo al Corazón" peaked at number nine on the US Hot Latin Songs chart, number one on Latin Airplay and number twenty on Latin Digital Songs. It also reached number one on Latin Pop Airplay, number seven on Latin Pop Digital Songs, and number twelve on Tropical Songs. On the 2015 Billboard Year-End charts, "Disparo al Corazón" reached number fourteen on Latin Pop Songs, number forty-six on Latin Airplay, and number fifty-five on Hot Latin Songs.

The song peaked at number two on the Mexican Espanol Airplay chart and number ten on Mexico Airplay. In Spain, it reached number thirty-one.

== Music video ==
The music video for "Disparo al Corazón" was released on Vevo on March 20, 2015.

== Track listing ==
Digital single
No.	Title	Length
1.	"Disparo al Corazón"	3:50

Digital single
No.	Title	Length
1.	"Disparo al Corazón" (Remix featuring Brian Cross)	4:11

== Credits and personnel ==
Credits adapted from the liner notes of A Quien Quiera Escuchar.

- Songwriting – Ricky Martin, Pedro Capó, Yoel Henriquez, Rafael Esparza Ruiz
- Production – Julio Reyes Copello
- Recording – Carlos Fernando López, Dan Warner, Guillermo Vadalá, Julio Reyes Copello, Lee Levin, Ricardo López Lalinde
- Vocals engineering – Enrique Larreal
- Arrangement – Carlos Fernando López, Julio Reyes Copello, Ricardo López Lalinde
- Strings arrangement – Carlos Fernando López, Julio Reyes Copello
- Acoustic and electric guitar – Dan Warner
- Banjo and triple – Ricardo López Lalinde
- Bass – Guillermo Vadalá
- Cello – Wells Cunningham
- Drums – Lee Levin

== Charts ==
=== Weekly charts ===
Chart (2015)	Peak position
Dominican Republic Pop (Monitor Latino)	4
Mexico (Billboard Mexican Airplay)	10
Spain (Promusicae)	31
US Hot Latin Songs (Billboard)	9
US Latin Airplay (Billboard)	1
US Latin Pop Airplay (Billboard)	1
US Tropical Airplay (Billboard)	12

=== Year-end charts ===
Chart (2015)	Position
Dominican Republic Pop (Monitor Latino)	8
Mexico Pop (Monitor Latino)	9
US Hot Latin Songs (Billboard)	55

== Certifications ==
Region	Certification	Certified units/sales
Mexico (AMPROFON)	Platinum+Gold	90,000^{‡}
^{‡} Sales+streaming figures based on certification alone.

== Release history ==
Country	Date	Format	Label	Ref.
United States	January 13, 2015	Digital download	Sony Music Latin	
United States	February 17, 2015	Digital download (Remix)	Sony Music Latin	

== See also ==
- List of Billboard Hot Latin Songs and Latin Airplay number ones of 2015
