= Rayito =

Spanish musician (born 1982)

- Also known as: Rayito
- Born: Antonio Rayo; July 16, 1982 (age 44)
- Origin: Madrid, Spain
- Genres: Latin pop, Flamenco
- Occupations: Singer, song writer, producer
- Instrument: Guitar
- Label: Sony

Antonio Rayo (born July 16, 1982), best known as Rayito, is a Spanish musician of Gitano and Japanese heritage. His father, a flamenco guitarist, taught him to play the instrument at a young age, and at the age of four years he was already giving concerts and winning television contests. By age eight he was famous throughout Spain as a virtuoso of flamenco guitar, and in 1992, at age ten, he released his first album, Rayito en Concierto. Thus he became the youngest person accepted into the SGAE, the Spanish equivalent of ASCAP. At age 15 he moved to Miami, where he collaborated with artists including Luciano Pavarotti, Plácido Domingo, Julio Iglesias, Paulina Rubio, Ricky Martin, and David Bisbal. In June 2005 he moved again to Puerto Rico, where he began work on a new project of his own. The product was his eponymous second album, which he released on September 26, 2006. He describes it as a flamenco pop album that draws on reggae, hip hop, Caribbean rhythms, and Latin American styles. Rayo signed a publishing deal with Sony in January 2009. He has worked with David Bisbal, Paulina Rubio, and Rihanna, among other artists.

== Credits ==
- "Lloraré las penas" - David Bisbal (2002)
- "Jaleo" - Ricky Martin (2003)
- "Cómo olvidar" - David Bisbal (2004)
- "Sin palabras de relleno" - Chayanne (2007)
- "No vale la pena" - David Bustamante (2008)
- "Cuánto te amé" - David Bustamante (2008)
- "Gitana" - David Bustamante (2008)
- "Crees que me engañas" - Shaila Dúrcal (2008)
- "Hay milagros" - Shaila Dúrcal (2008)
- "Ojo por ojo" - David Bustamante (2009)
- "Al Ándalus" - David Bisbal (2009)
- "Antes o después" - David Bisbal (2009)
- "Latin Love" - David Bisbal (2009)
- "Ahora tú" - Malú (2010)
- "Solo por amor" - Camila (2012)
- "Bailar" - Lorena Gómez (2013)
- "La noche de los dos" - Daddy Yankee ft Natalia Jiménez (2013)
- "Madre Tierra (Oye)" - Chayanne (2014)
- "Adiós" - Ricky Martin (2014)
- "Corazón" - Claudia Leitte ft Daddy Yankee
- "Ladies' Night" - Sweet California (2016)
- "Ando buscando" - Carlos Baute ft Piso 21 (2016)
- "No creo en el amor" - Danny Romero ft Sanco ft Becky G (2016)
- "Todo no es casualidad" - India Martínez (2016)
- "Together" - Yall ft Mandy Diaz
- "Do It for Your Lover" - Manel Navarro (2017)
- "Tiemblo" - Carlos Ares (2017)
- "Casi humanos" - Dvicio (2017)
- "Me enamoré" - Shakira (2017)
- "Pasajeros" - Merche (2017)
- "Vamo' a la calle" - Carlos Baute (2017)
- "Acércate" - David Lafuente ft Rasel (2017)
- "Romeo y Juliet" - Matt Terry (2017)
- "Mama" - Matt Terry ft Ana Mena (2017)
- "Acércate" - David Lafuente ft Rasel (2017)
- "Ay Dios mío" - Sweet California ft Danny Romero (2017)
- "Qué bonito" - Soraya (2018)
- "Mi cama" - Karol G (2018)
- "Él no soy yo" - Blas Cantó (2018)
