= Ricky Martin =

Puerto Rican singer (born 1971)

- Martin in 2026
- Born: Enrique Martín Morales; December 24, 1971 (age 54); San Juan, Puerto Rico, U.S.
- Citizenship: United States; Spain
- Occupations: Singer; songwriter; actor; model; author
- Years active: 1984–present
- Organizations: Martin Music Lab; Ricky Martin Foundation
- Works: Albums; singles; songs; videography
- Spouse: Jwan Yosef (m. 2017; sep. 2023)
- Children: 4
- Awards: Full list
- Musical career
- Genres: Pop; dance; reggaeton; salsa
- Instrument: Vocals
- Labels: Sony Mexico; Columbia; Sony Latin
- Formerly of: Menudo
- Website: rickymartinmusic.com

Signature
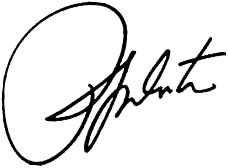

Enrique "Ricky" Martín Morales (Note: Spanish pronunciation: [enˈrike maɾˈtin moˈɾales]) (born December 24, 1971) is a Puerto Rican singer and songwriter. He is known for his musical versatility, with his discography incorporating a wide variety of many elements, such as Latin pop, dance, reggaeton, salsa, and other genres. Dubbed the "King of Latin Pop", the "King of Latin Music", and the "Latin Pop God", he is regarded as one of the most influential artists in the world. Born in San Juan, Martin began appearing in television commercials at age nine and began his musical career at twelve, as a member of Puerto Rican boy band Menudo. He began his solo career in 1991 while in Sony Music Mexico, gaining recognition in Latin America with the release of his first two studio albums, Ricky Martin (1991) and Me Amaras (1993), both of which were focused on ballads.

Martin's third album, A Medio Vivir (1995), helped him rise to prominence in European countries. The chart-topping single "María" incorporated a mixture of Latin music genres and became his first international hit. His international success was further solidified with his fourth album, Vuelve (1998). The album, which earned Martin his first Grammy Award, spawned songs "Vuelve" and "La Copa de la Vida". Martin performed the latter at the 41st Annual Grammy Awards. His first English album, Ricky Martin (1999) became his first US Billboard 200 number one. The lead single "Livin' la Vida Loca" topped both the Billboard Hot 100 and the UK Singles Chart. Martin's success in the late 1990s is generally seen as the beginning of the "Latin explosion". He has been credited for propelling the Latin pop music genre to mainstream recognition, paving the way for a large number of Latin artists to achieve global success.

Martin has since released several successful albums, including Almas del Silencio (2003) and MTV Unplugged (2006), as well as Grammy Award winner A Quien Quiera Escuchar (2015). Notable singles in this period include "She Bangs", "Nobody Wants to Be Lonely", "Tal Vez", "Tu Recuerdo", "La Mordidita", "Vente Pa' Ca", and "Canción Bonita". As an actor, Martin took a role in the hit soap opera General Hospital (1994–1996), while his portrayal of Antonio D'Amico in The Assassination of Gianni Versace: American Crime Story (2018) garnered him an Emmy nomination. He also starred as Ché in the Broadway revival of the musical Evita in 2012.

Martin is one of the best-selling Latin music artists of all time, having sold over 70 million records worldwide. He has scored 11 Billboard Hot Latin Songs number-one songs, and won two Grammy Awards, five Latin Grammy Awards, six MTV Video Music Awards, two American Music Awards, three Latin American Music Awards, three Billboard Music Awards, nine Billboard Latin Music Awards, eight World Music Awards, fourteen Lo Nuestro Awards, a Guinness World Record, and a star on the Hollywood Walk of Fame. His philanthropy and activism focus on LGBT rights and fighting against human trafficking. In 2004, he founded The Ricky Martin Foundation, a non-profit, non-governmental organization that focuses on denouncing human trafficking and educating about the crime's existence.

== Early life ==
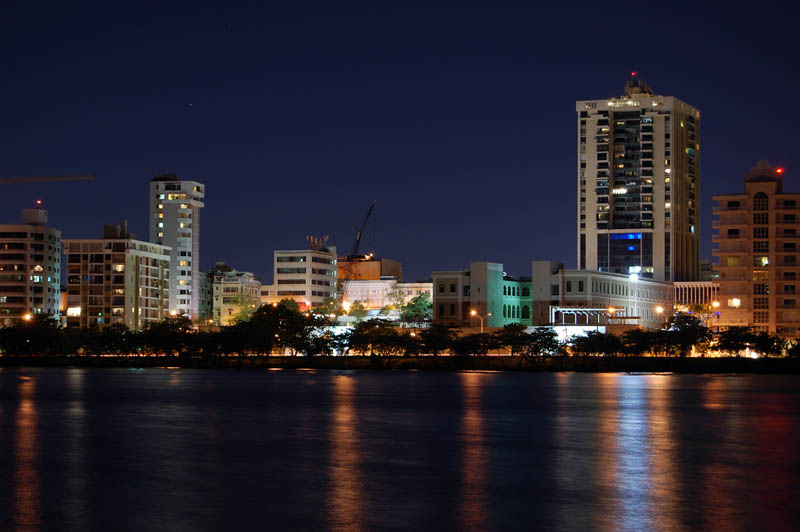
Martin was born in San Juan.

Enrique Martín Morales was born on December 24, 1971, in San Juan, Puerto Rico. His mother, Doña Nereida Morales, is a former accountant; his father, Enrique Martín Negroni, is a former psychologist who previously worked as a regional supervisor for a Puerto Rican mental-health agency. His parents divorced when he was two years old, and although his mother had custody of Martin, he could also move freely between his father's house in the middle-class suburb of University Gardens in San Juan, and his paternal grandmother's house nearby. In an interview with People, he told the magazine that he "never had to make decisions" about who he loved more, and he was "always happy". Martin has two older maternal half-brothers, Fernando and Ángel Fernández, two younger paternal half-brothers, Eric and Daniel Martín, and a younger paternal half-sister, Vanessa Martín. Martin has Spanish heritage of Basque and Canarian descent. As he explained to ABC, the Martins traveled from Segovia, Spain to Puerto Rico in 1779. He also has some Corsican origins through his paternal grandmother.

Martin grew up Catholic. The people closest to him called him "Kiki" (a nickname that comes from Enrique). He began singing at age six, using wooden kitchen spoons as make-believe microphones; he often sang songs by Puerto Rican boy band Menudo, as well as English-language rock groups such as Led Zeppelin, Journey, and REO Speedwagon. His mother's side of the family was musically inclined and his maternal grandfather was a poet. Martin later reflected on his time spent with his family as a child: "Every time I find myself in front of an audience, be it twenty people or one hundred thousand, once again I feel the energy that consumed me back at the family gatherings of my youth." He attended Colegio Sagrado Corazón, a bilingual Catholic grade school in University Gardens since fourth grade and was an "average" student there. When he was nine years old, he began appearing in television commercials for products such as soft drinks, toothpaste, and fast food restaurants, including Orange Crush and Burger King. In a year and a half, he starred in 11 commercials.

== Career ==
=== 1984–1989: Menudo ===
"Rayo de Luna"
Martin made his recording debut on the song "Rayo de Luna", from Menudo's 1984 album, Evolución.

After achieving moderate fame in Puerto Rico for his appearances in television commercials, Martin auditioned for membership in Menudo. Formed in Puerto Rico in 1977, Menudo members were usually replaced when they hit 16 to keep the band "full of fresh-faced members". Although the executives enjoyed his dancing and singing at his first two auditions, Martin was rejected because he was too short. By the third audition, his persistence impressed executives, and in 1984, 12-year-old Martin became a member. He replaced member Ricky Melendez at Menudo. A month after joining Menudo, he made his debut performance with the group at the Luis A. Ferré Performing Arts Center in San Juan (he had previously sung at a Menudo concert, at Ricky Melendez's last concert as a member of the band on September 16, 1984). During this performance, he inadvertently disobeyed the choreography by walking around the stage, when it was planned that he would stay still, and was chastised by the band manager after the show: "The mistake was such a big deal that from that moment on, never again did I move when I wasn't supposed to move. That was the discipline of Menudo: You either did things the way you were told or you were not part of the group." Although Martin enjoyed traveling and performing onstage with Menudo, he found the band's busy schedule and strict management exhausting, and later reflected that the experience "cost" him his childhood. Despite this, Martin acknowledged his "opportunity to have so many amazing experiences with so many amazing people" during his time with the group. During his time with Menudo, he became a "key-member of the group" and a "fan-favorite", while the band released 11 albums, including the Grammy-nominated Evolución (transl. Evolution) (1984) and their highest-charting and longest-running album on the US Billboard 200, Menudo (1985). The former featured Martin's debut single, "Rayo de Luna" (transl. "Moonlight") and the latter included the hit single "Hold Me". "Hold Me" became the group's first and only entry on the US Billboard Hot 100 chart, peaking at number 62. It was ranked among the "100 Greatest Boy Band Songs of All Time" by Billboard, the "75 Greatest Boy Band Songs of All Time" by Rolling Stone, and the "30 Best Boy Band Songs" by Complex. Besides the musical career, Martin appeared with other members of Menudo in the American romantic comedy/drama television series, The Love Boat (1985), and the Argentine soap opera, Por Siempre Amigos (1987). He also developed an interest in philanthropy when the group became UNICEF ambassadors.

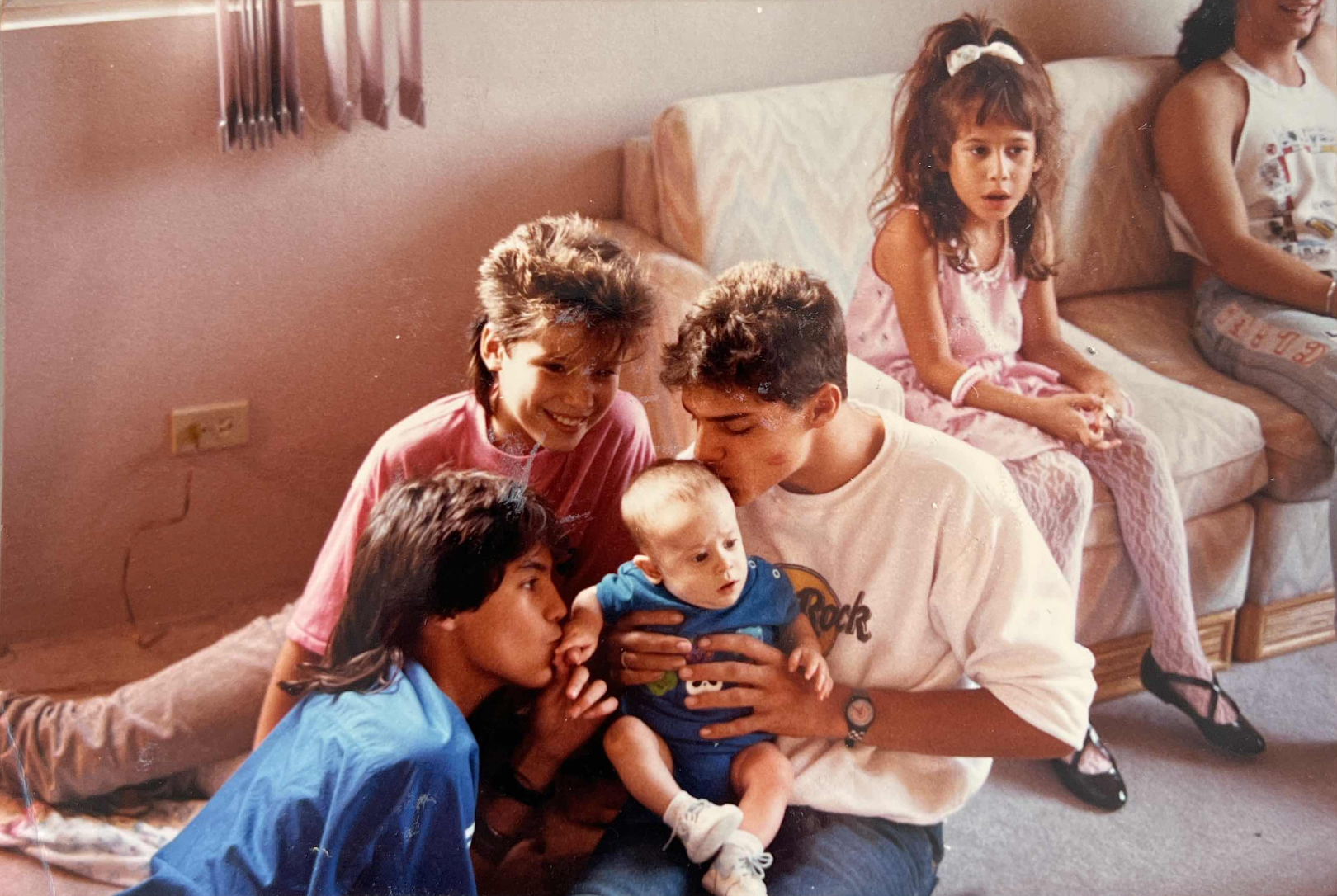
Martin (holding baby) with Menudo band members.

Finally, Martin left the band in July 1989, at age 17, hoping to rest and evaluate his career path; he stayed a few extra months after his "age-mandated retirement" came around. He performed his final show with the group at the same venue where he had performed his first performance as a member. Martin returned to Puerto Rico to "get a break from the pressures of the group, the promotional tours, and the constant stress of work." He graduated from high school, and 13 days after turning 18, he moved to New York City to celebrate his financial independence; since he was a minor during his time with Menudo, Martin was not allowed to access his own bank accounts.

=== 1990–1994: Acting and first solo albums ===
Martin was accepted into New York University's Tisch School of the Arts in 1990, but before classes began, his friend invited him to Mexico City. He attended the musical comedy play, Mama Ama el Rock (transl. Mom Loves Rock) there, and was offered to stay and replace one of the actors. He accepted the offer, dropped out of university and moved from New York to Mexico City to perform in the play. While he was performing onstage in Mama Ama el Rock, a producer in the audience took notice of Martin's acting and offered him a role in the Mexican telenovela Alcanzar una estrella II (1991). A film based on the TV series, titled Más que alcanzar una estrella (transl. More than reaching for a star) (1992), was also produced in which Martin starred, and earned him an El Heraldo Award for his role.

I was so excited about getting back into the music world that I didn't care what the conditions were. All of the hard work and passion I had exerted was finally now starting to come to fruition, and music came back to my life powerfully and definitively.

— Martin, on recording his debut studio album

A Sony Discos executive noticed Martin's acting in the soap operas and offered him his first solo music recording contract. Eager to record his first solo album and hustled by the executive, Martin signed the contract without reading its conditions and inadvertently signed a deal in which he would only be paid one cent for each album sold. Despite viewing the contract as unfair, Martin referred to the record as "the start of something phenomenal" for him. After working "around the clock" to finish filming Alcanzar una estrella II and recording music, he released his debut solo album, Ricky Martin, on November 26, 1991. The album peaked at number five on the US Billboard Latin Pop Albums chart and spent a total of 41 weeks on the list. It sold over 500,000 copies worldwide, was certified gold in several countries, and spawned his first solo hit singles, "Fuego Contra Fuego" (transl. "Fire Against Fire"), "El Amor de Mi Vida" (transl. "The Love of My Life"), and "Dime Que Me Quieres" (transl. "Tell Me You Love Me"). Both "Fuego Contra Fuego" and "El Amor de Mi Vida" reached the top 10 on the US Billboard Hot Latin Tracks. To promote the album, Martin embarked on a successful Latin American tour, breaking box office records, which the singer referred to as "an indescribable feeling, almost like coming home".

After the success of Ricky Martin and its subsequent tour, Martin's record company met him with the Spanish musician Juan Carlos Calderón to work on his second studio album, Me Amaras (transl. You'll Love Me) (1993). Although Martin felt "very grateful" for the opportunity to work with Calderón, he noted, "I always felt that that record was more his than mine." The album sold over one million copies worldwide and was certified triple-platinum in Chile.

During 1993, Martin suffered two harrowing incidents: he was injured in a car accident and also almost got involved in a plane crash, when a plane that flew him to San Diego, California for an interview, crashed right after dropping him off.

In 1994, Martin's agent encouraged him to move to Los Angeles to act in an American sitcom called Getting By. The show was canceled after two seasons, but soon afterward, Martin was given the role of Miguel Morez on the popular hit soap opera General Hospital; Morez, a bartender and singer, known for his long and flowing hair, was a Puerto Rican citizen hiding in the United States from his lover's criminal mastermind father and created a love triangle with his fiancé Lily Rivera and Brenda. Martin portrayed the role for two years and gained huge popularity and stardom, becoming "one of the most-talked about actors on the soap opera". Despite this, Martin felt he lacked chemistry with the rest of the General Hospital cast and observed that people treated him differently because of his Puerto Rican accent. At the time, it was relatively uncommon for Latin actors to appear on American television, and people suggested that he take accent reduction classes, which he refused.

=== 1995–1997: Breakthrough with A Medio Vivir ===
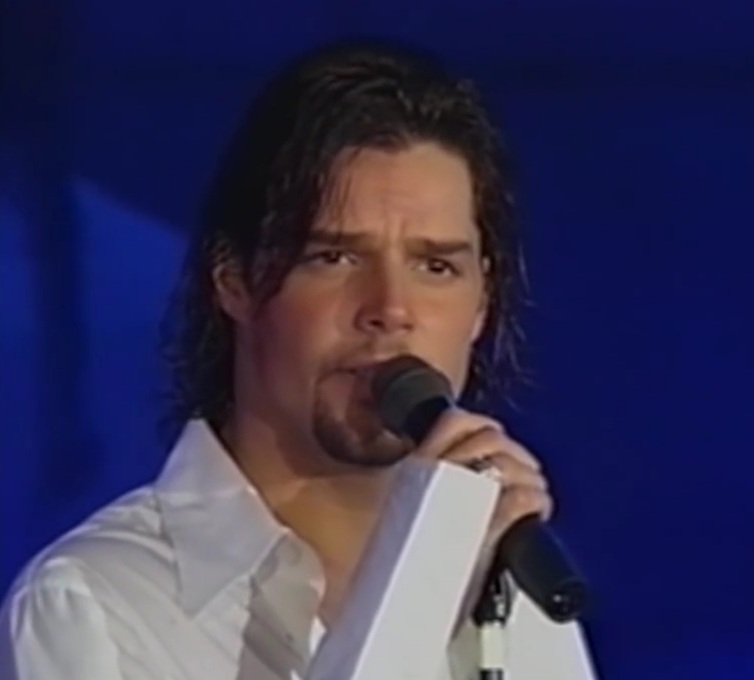
Martin performing "Te Extraño, Te Olvido, Te Amo" at the 37th Viña del Mar International Song Festival in 1996

In 1995, Martin refocused on his music career, and began working on his third studio album, A Medio Vivir (transl. Half Alive). The album was released in September 1995, and became a huge success; it sold over three million copies worldwide. being certified gold in the United States, platinum in France, 4× platinum in Spain, as well as many other certifications in Latin American countries. It spawned several successful hits, including "Te Extraño, Te Olvido, Te Amo" (transl. "I Miss You, I Forget You, I Love You"), "María", and "Volverás" (transl. "You Will Come Back"). On "María", which was released as the second single from the album, Martin allowed himself "to go into a very Latin, African sound". He created a mix of different Latin music genres instead of singing a romantic ballad, the style that he focused on it in his first two albums, while Latin pop music in general was mainly made up of it at the time. Although Martin was satisfied with the track and he describes it as a song that he is "extremely proud of", the first time he played it for a record label executive, the man said: "Are you crazy? You have ruined your career! I can't believe you are showing me this. You're finished — this is going to be your last album." Despite this, the track became Martin's breakthrough song and his first international hit. It topped the charts in 20 countries, and has sold over five million physical copies worldwide. As a result, the song was featured in the 1999 edition of The Guinness Book of Records as the biggest Latin hit.

In Australia, "María" spent six weeks at number one, topped the country's year-end chart in 1998, and was certified platinum. The song also spent nine weeks at number one in France, and was certified diamond, selling over 1.4 million copies there. Additionally, the track reached the top 10 in the United Kingdom, and became Martin's first entry on the US Billboard Hot 100 chart. To promote A Medio Vivir, he embarked on the worldwide A Medio Vivir Tour, that lasted for more than two years, through which he performed 63 shows and visited Europe, Latin America and the United States. During an interview with The Miami Herald in 1996, Martin expressed an interest in performing on Broadway. In a few days, he received a phone call from producer Richard Jay-Alexander, and was offered the role of Marius Pontmercy in the play Les Misérables. After the conclusion of the A Medio Vivir Tour in Latin America, Martin returned to New York to appear in the play in an eleven-week run. He greatly enjoyed the experience, calling his time in the play an "honor" and "the role of [his] life". Martin continued to tour after the conclusion of the show's run, and noted that his audiences were growing in both size and enthusiasm.

=== 1998–1999: Vuelve ===
While the A Medio Vivir Tour had not been concluded yet, Martin returned to the studio to record his fourth album Vuelve (transl. Come Back). He called the experience of touring and recording at the same time "brutal and incredibly intense". As he was finishing the record in 1997, "María" caught the attention of FIFA. They contacted Martin and asked him to create a song as the 1998 FIFA World Cup anthem. He stated about the request: "I have to admit that the challenge made me a bit nervous, but the massive growth potential for my career was such that I decided to accept." Following his acceptance, musicians K.C. Porter, Robi Rosa, and Desmond Child joined him and they started working on a song titled "La Copa de la Vida" (English: "The Cup of Life"). Martin wrote about the recording:

From that moment on, we began to look at the album as part of a global strategy to promote Latin music worldwide, so we chose and arranged the songs with the sole mission of getting the entire globe to dance and sing in Spanish. It was a unique opportunity to introduce the charms of Latin music to the rest of the world.

"La Copa de la Vida" was included on Vuelve, released February 12, 1998. The album became a huge success; it sold over eight million copies worldwide, becoming the best-selling Spanish-language album in history, according to his label. Also, some sources have reported the album's sales as six million copies worldwide. It spent 26 weeks atop the US Billboard Top Latin Albums chart and was certified platinum by the Recording Industry Association of America (RIAA). In Canada, the album peaked at number three and was certified double platinum. Vuelve spawned big hits, including the title track, "La Copa de la Vida", "Perdido Sin Ti" (transl. "Lost Without You"), and "La Bomba" (transl. "The Bomb"). "La Copa de la Vida" grew to be an international success, appearing on the charts in more than 60 countries, and reaching number one in 30 countries, Both "Vuelve" and "Perdido Sin Ti" peaked at number one on the US Billboard Hot Latin Tracks chart; the former also reached number one in eight countries. On July 12, 1998, Martin performed "La Copa de la Vida" as the official anthem at the 1998 FIFA World Cup Final in France, in front of more than a billion TV viewers around the world.

To promote Vuelve, Martin embarked on the worldwide Vuelve Tour; he performed in Asia, Australia, Europe, Mexico, South America, and the United States. Although Latin music was not important to the Recording Academy or the mainstream music industry at the time, Tommy Mottola, then-chief of Columbia Records, was certain about Martin's stardom and pushed hard to have him on the Grammy Awards ceremony. Finally, on February 24, 1999, cavorting with a 15-piece band alongside and a large number of dancers and percussionists, Martin performed a bilingual version of "La Copa de La Vida" at the 41st Annual Grammy Awards, which was greeted with a standing ovation and met with acclaim from music critics. At the same night, Vuelve earned Martin his first Grammy award, for Best Latin Pop Performance.

=== 1999–2000: Crossover to English ===
Ricky Martin "Livin' la Vida Loca" (1999)

In October 1998, CNN confirmed that Martin has been working on his first English language album, following the huge success of Vuelve. The album was titled Ricky Martin and was released on May 11, 1999, two weeks ahead of schedule, because of the huge interest in the disc, following Martin's performance at the Grammy Awards. Tim Devin, the general manager of Tower Records stated about Martin: "He's always been one of our strongest Latin artists, but interest in him has picked up considerably since that performance." Ricky Martin debuted atop the US Billboard 200 with first-week sales of 661,000 copies, becoming the largest sales week by any album in 1999. It also broke the record as the largest first-week sales for any pop or Latin artist in history, as well as any Columbia Records artist during the SoundScan era. With this album, Martin became the first male Latin act in history to debut at number one on the US Billboard 200 chart. It was certified 7× platinum by RIAA, denoting shipments of over seven million copies in the US and breaking the record as the best-selling album by a Latin artist in the country. Only within three months, Ricky Martin became the best-selling album ever by a Latin artist. According to different sources, the album has sold over 15 million copies or even 17 million copies worldwide. It was nominated for Best Pop Album at the 42nd Annual Grammy Awards.

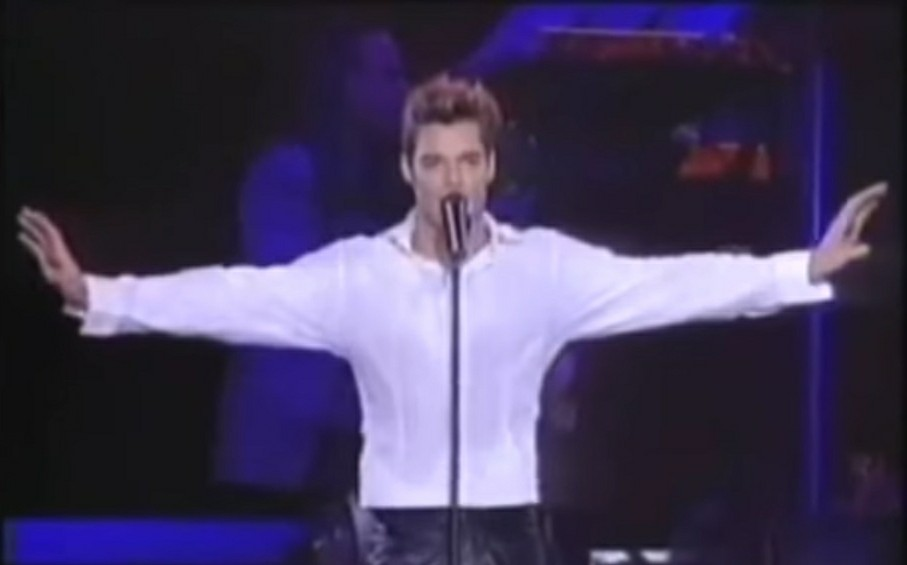
Martin performing at the worldwide Livin' la Vida Loca Tour in 2000

The album's lead single "Livin' la Vida Loca" (transl. "Livin' the Crazy Life") topped the charts in more than 20 countries and is considered to be Martin's biggest hit, and one of the best-selling singles of all time. In the United States, it topped the Billboard Hot 100 chart for five consecutive weeks, becoming Martin's first number one single on the chart. Additionally, it broke several records on Billboard charts. It also spent eight consecutive weeks atop the Canada Top Singles chart and topped the country's year-end chart. In the United Kingdom, it debuted at number one and stayed there for three weeks, making Martin the first Puerto Rican artist in history to hit number one. The track was ranked as the best '90s pop song by Elle, and was listed among the Best Latin Songs of All Time by Billboard. It was nominated for four categories at the 42nd Annual Grammy Awards, including Record of the Year and Song of the Year. Its Spanish version reached the summit of the Billboard Hot Latin Tracks chart, and was nominated for Record of the Year at the 1st Annual Latin Grammy Awards. "She's All I Ever Had" was released as the second single from the album in June 1999. It peaked at numbers two and three on the US Billboard Hot 100 and Canada Top Singles charts, respectively. The Spanish version, "Bella" (transl. "Beautiful") topped the charts in five countries, as well as Billboard's Hot Latin Tracks chart. To further promote Ricky Martin, he embarked on the worldwide Livin' la Vida Loca Tour, which was the highest-grossing tour of 2000 by a Latin artist in the US.

=== 2000–2005: Sound Loaded, Almas del Silencio, and Life ===
While the Livin' la Vida Loca Tour had not been concluded yet, Martin returned to the studio to record his sixth studio album, Sound Loaded. The album was released on November 14, 2000. It debuted at number four on the Billboard 200 with first-week sales of 318,000 copies. The album has sold over seven million copies or even eight million copies worldwide, according to different sources, being certified double platinum in the US. The album featured two hit singles, "She Bangs" and "Nobody Wants to Be Lonely". The former reached number one in seven countries, including Italy and Sweden, as well as the top five in Australia, Canada, the United Kingdom, and several other countries. It was nominated for Best Male Pop Vocal Performance at the 43rd Annual Grammy Awards. The Spanish-language version of "She Bangs" reached the summit of the Hot Latin Tracks chart and won the Latin Grammy Award for Best Music Video at the 2nd Annual Latin Grammy Awards. "Nobody Wants to Be Lonely" was re-recorded along with American singer Christina Aguilera, peaking at number one in five countries, as well as the top five in Italy, Germany, Spain, and the United Kingdom, among others. It was nominated for Best Pop Collaboration with Vocals at the 44th Annual Grammy Awards. The solo Spanish version, entitled "Sólo Quiero Amarte" topped the Hot Latin Tracks chart. Both "She Bangs" and "Nobody Wants to Be Lonely" are certified silver in the UK. In February 2001, Martin released a Spanish compilation album entitled La Historia (transl. The History), which spent five weeks at number one on the Top Latin Albums chart, topped the charts in Argentina and Sweden, and was certified quadruple Latin platinum in the United States. Later that year it was also announced that he would star in a remake of Elvis Presley's Viva Las Vegas alongside Jennifer Lopez, but this did not eventuate.

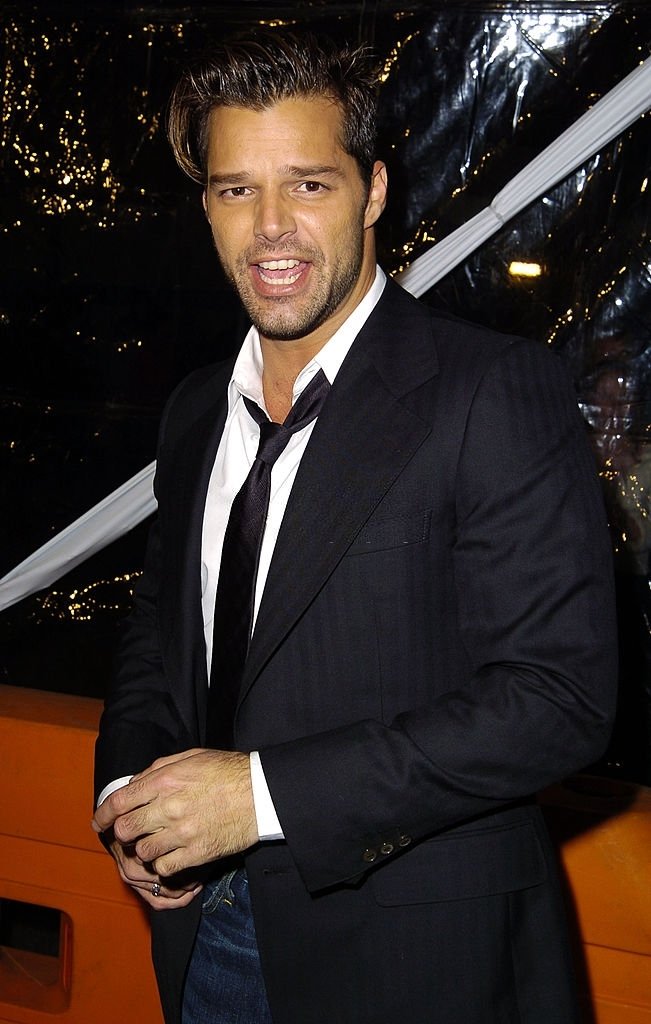
Martin on the red carpet for the premiere of Cold Mountain in 2003

Following the success of Ricky Martin and Sound Loaded, he initially planned to release the third English-language album as his seventh studio album, which was supposed to be his first complete work in the field of songwriting. Despite Sony Music Entertainment's original plan after a two-year hiatus he decided to release a Spanish-language album: "I woke up five months ago, and I said 'We're doing an album in Spanish.' Everyone went nuts. They said, 'You don't have time; you have to release an album in English because of timing issues with your career.' And that's fine. But I told them, 'In five months, you'll have a kick-ass album' [in Spanish]. Martin's seventh studio album, Almas del Silencio (transl. Souls from the Silence) was released in May 2003. It debuted atop the Billboard Top Latin Albums chart with first-week sales of 65,000 copies, according to data compiled by Nielsen SoundScan, breaking the record as the largest first-week sales for a Spanish-language album in the US. The album also debuted at number 12 on Billboard 200, tying the 2002 album, Quizás (transl. Maybe) as the chart's highest Spanish-language debut. The album also debuted at number one in "at least 13 Latin American markets" and sold over two million copies worldwide.

Almas del Silencio spawned three Hot Latin Tracks chart-topper hits: "Tal Vez" (transl. "Perhaps"), "Jaleo", and "Y Todo Queda en Nada" (transl. "And Everything Ends in Nothing"). "Tal Vez" debuted at number one on the Billboard Hot Latin Tracks chart on the week of April 12, 2003, marking the first number one debut since February 1998, and becoming the sixth song overall in the chart's history to do so. It spent a total of 11 weeks at this position, surpassing "Livin' la Vida Loca" as Martin's longest number-one single on the chart, and was the longest-running number one of 2003. It also topped the charts in several Latin American markets. In October 2005, Martin released his third English album, Life. He commented on the album: "I was really in touch with my emotions. I think this album is very multi-layered, just like life is. It's about feeling anger. It's about feeling joy. It's about feeling uncertainty. It's about feeling. And all my emotions are part of this production". To promote Life, Martin embarked on the worldwide One Night Only with Ricky Martin tour.

=== 2006–2012: MTV Unplugged, Música + Alma + Sexo, and Evita ===
Although Martin's team and MTV had discussed an MTV Unplugged for years, but it became more serious after Martin's the One Night Only tour, which featured an acoustic segment. Finally, Martin taped his MTV Unplugged set in Miami in August 2006, performing both romantic ballads and up-tempo tropical dance songs. During the performance, he debuted three new tracks, including "Tu Recuerdo" (transl. "Your Memory"), which was released to radio stations as the lead single from his debut live album MTV Unplugged (2006). The album debuted at number one on the Top Latin Albums chart and sold over two million copies worldwide, marking his highest-certified album in Mexico. It won two Latin Grammy awards and was nominated for Album of the Year. "Tu Recuerdo" reached number one in five countries, as well as the Billboard's Hot Latin Songs and Latin Pop Airplay charts. The track was certified quadruple platinum in Mexico and was nominated for Record of the Year at the 8th Annual Latin Grammy Awards. The artist then embarked on the Black and White Tour in 2007, including four sold-out shows at the José Miguel Agrelot Coliseum in Puerto Rico. The concerts in Puerto Rico were compiled into his second live album Ricky Martin... Live Black & White Tour (2007). Later that year, he released his first Italian song, "Non siamo soli" (transl. "We Are Not Alone") as a duet with Italian singer Eros Ramazzotti. The song debuted at number one in Italy and spent eleven consecutive weeks atop the chart.

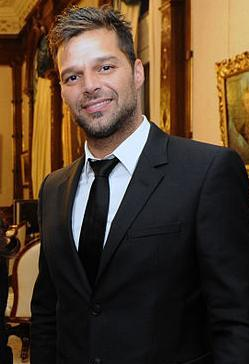
Martin in 2011

In January 2011, Martin launched his ninth studio album, Música + Alma + Sexo (transl. Music + Soul + Sex). The album debuted at number three on the US Billboard 200 chart, becoming the highest-charting primarily-Spanish language set since Dreaming of You (1995) by American singer Selena. It holds the record as the highest-charting Latin album of the 2010s, and represents the highest-ever chart debut on the Billboard 200 for a Sony Music Latin release. Música + Alma + Sexo also peaked at number one in Argentina and Venezuela, as well as Billboard's Top Latin Albums. Its lead single, "Lo Mejor de Mi Vida Eres Tú" (English: "The Best Thing About Me Is You") reached number one on the US Billboard Hot Latin Songs chart and was nominated for Record of the Year, Song of the Year, and Best Short Form Music Video at the 12th Annual Latin Grammy Awards. To promote the album, Martin embarked on the Música + Alma + Sexo World Tour in 2011. In February 2012, he appeared as Spanish teacher David Martinez on the twelfth episode of the third season of the American musical television series Glee, "The Spanish Teacher". Martin starred as Ché in the Broadway revival of the musical Evita from March 2012 to January 2013. The show became a hit, breaking the theatre's box-office sales record after only six performances. Since then, it broke its own record six times and was nominated for Best Revival of a Musical at the 66th Tony Awards. The show's soundtrack album debuted at number one on Billboard's cast album chart.

=== 2013–2018: The Voice, A Quien Quiera Escuchar, and The Assassination of Gianni Versace ===
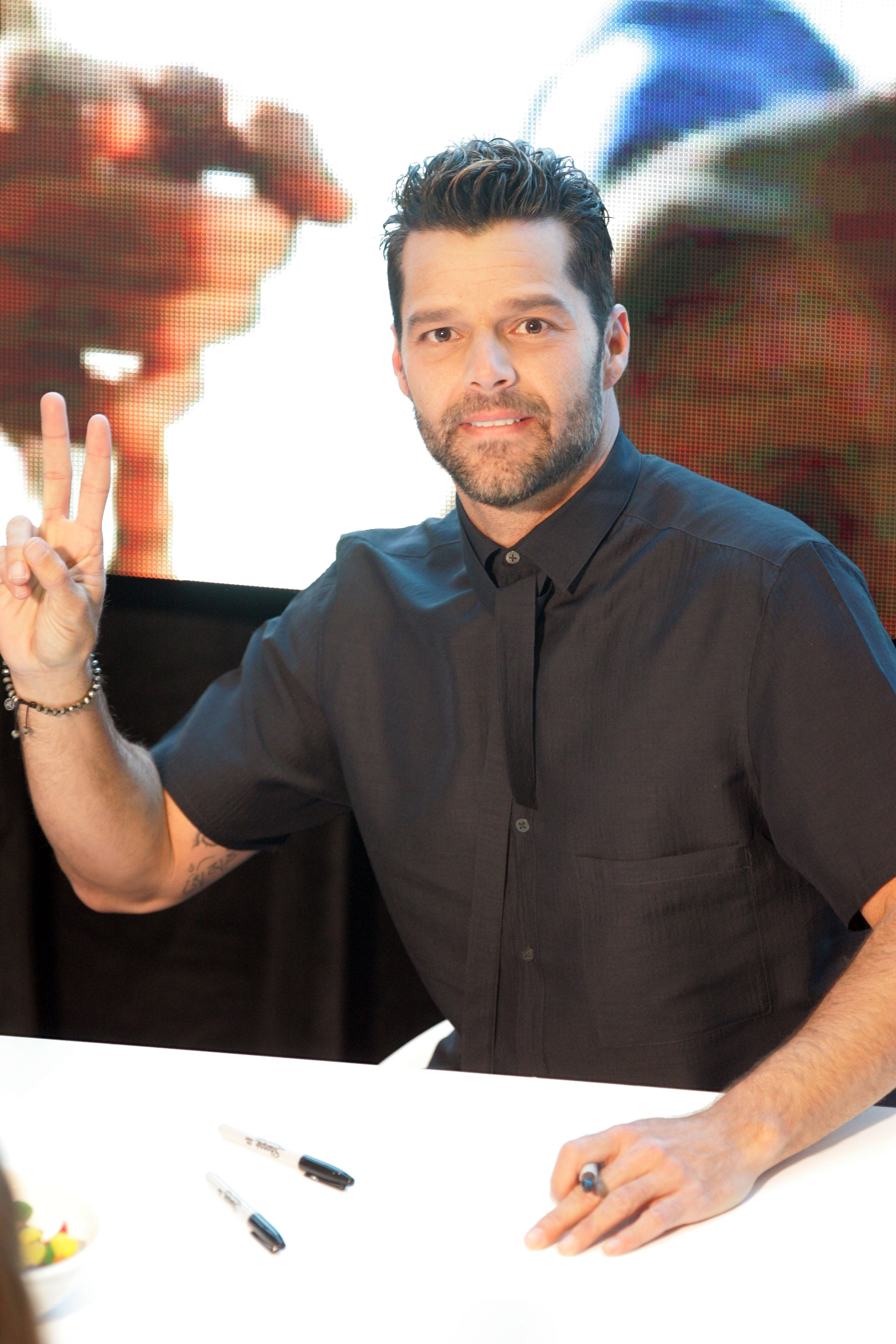
Martin in Australia in 2014

Martin served as a coach to replace Keith Urban on the second season of the Australian singing competition television series The Voice in 2013. In the same year, he released a compilation album, entitled Greatest Hits: Souvenir Edition, which reached number two in Australia, as well as a new single, entitled "Come with Me", which debuted at number three in the country. The artist then embarked on the Ricky Martin Live tour in Australia in October 2013. He continued serving as a coach on both the third and fourth seasons of The Voice Australia in 2014 and 2015, respectively. In 2014, Lars Brandle from Billboard stated in an article: "Through his high-profile slot on The Voice, Ricky's profile in Australia has never been as big as it is right now." On February 25, 2014, Wisin released a song titled "Adrenalina" (transl. "Adrenaline") from his album El Regreso del Sobreviviente (transl. The Return of the Survivor), which featured Jennifer Lopez and Martin, and became the Univision's 2014 World Cup song. Later that year, Martin released his single "Vida" (transl. "Life") for the 2014 FIFA World Cup. The song reached the top five in Spain and on the US Hot Latin Songs chart. Also in 2014, he served as a coach on the fourth season of The Voice Mexico, and embarked on the Live in Mexico tour.

In February 2015, Martin released his tenth studio album, A Quien Quiera Escuchar (transl. To Those Who Want to Listen). The album debuted at number one on Billboard's Top Latin Albums chart and peaked at number one in Argentina. It won the award for Best Latin Pop Album at the 58th Annual Grammy Awards and Album of the Year at the 1st Latin American Music Awards. The album spawned three Hot Latin Songs top-10 hits: "Adiós" (transl. "Goodbye"), "Disparo al Corazón" (transl. "Shot to the Heart"), and "La Mordidita" (transl. "the Nibble"). "Disparo al Corazón" was nominated for both Record of the Year and Song of the Year at the 16th Annual Latin Grammy Awards. "La Mordidita" experienced huge commercial success, being certified 15× Latin platinum in the United States. Its accompanying music video has received over 1.2 billion views on YouTube. To promote the album, Martin embarked on the One World Tour from 2015 to 2017. He served as an executive producer and a judge on the American singing competition series La Banda (transl. the Band), which premiered in 2015 and 2016 on Univision. The first season was "looking for the next Latin boy band", while the second season was looking for a Latin girl band. The contestants would compete for a recording deal with Sony Music Latin and Syco Music. CNCO, known as the first boy band to make reggaeton, was the winner of the first season. Martin became their manager and produced the band's debut album, Primera Cita (transl. First Date) (2016).

On September 23, 2016, Martin released a song called "Vente Pa' Ca" (transl. "Come Here"), featuring Colombian singer Maluma. The song became one of the biggest Spanish-language songs of 2016, reaching number one in seven countries, as well as Billboard's Latin Airplay, Latin Pop Airplay, and Tropical Airplay charts. It also reached top five in Spain and on the Billboard Hot Latin Songs, being certified quadruple platinum in Spain and diamond in Mexico. The track was nominated for both Record of the Year and Song of the Year at the 18th Annual Latin Grammy Awards. The accompanying music video has received over 1.75 billion views on YouTube. Martin signed a concert residency, named All In, to perform at the Monte Carlo Resort and Casino in Las Vegas in 2017 and 2018. He portrayed fashion designer Gianni Versace's partner Antonio D'Amico in the FX true crime anthology television series The Assassination of Gianni Versace: American Crime Story, marking "the acting opportunity of his career". The role garnered him a nomination for Outstanding Supporting Actor in a Limited Series Or Movie at the 70th Primetime Emmy Awards. In February 2018, Martin released a song titled "Fiebre" (transl. "Fever"), featuring Wisin & Yandel. The song was commercially successful in Latin America, reaching number one in Chile, Ecuador, Guatemala, Mexico, and Uruguay. It also reached the summit of the Billboard Latin Airplay and Latin Rhythm Airplay charts.

=== 2019–present: Amici di Maria De Filippi, PausaPlay, and Jingle Jangle: A Christmas Journey ===
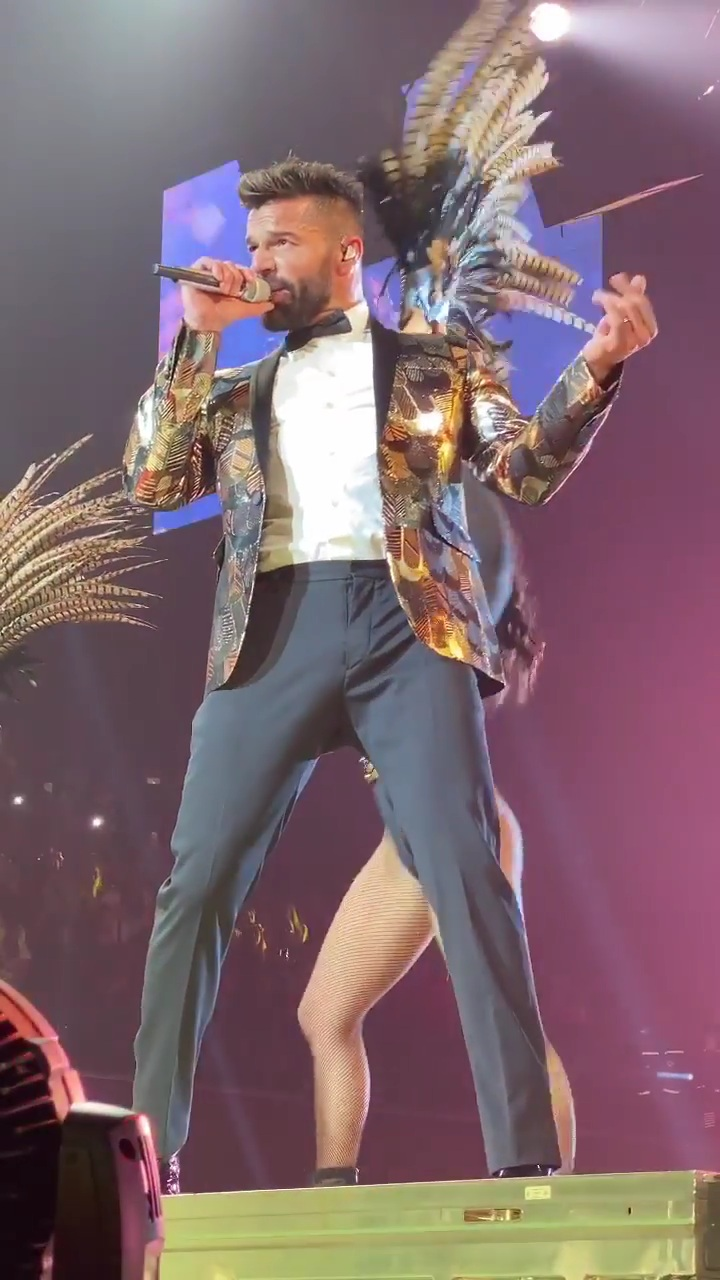
Martin performing "Livin' la Vida Loca" on his Movimiento Tour in 2020

At the 61st Annual Grammy Awards, Martin performed "Havana", "Pégate" (transl. "Get Closer"), and "Mi Gente" (transl. "My People"), alongside Camila Cabello, J Balvin, Young Thug, and Arturo Sandoval, as the opening performance. Martin served as a coach on the eighteenth season of the Italian talent show Amici di Maria De Filippi (transl. Friends of Maria De Filippi) in 2019. In the same year, Maluma released a song called "No Se Me Quita" (transl. "It Doesn't Go Away") from his album 11:11, which featured Martin. The song reached number one in Mexico and was certified quadruple platinum in the country. Martin hosted the 20th Annual Latin Grammy Awards in November 2019, along with Roselyn Sánchez and Paz Vega. The artist started recording his eleventh studio album, initially titled Movimiento (transl. Movement), in the second half of 2019, inspired by the 2019 political protests in Puerto Rico. He embarked on the Movimiento Tour in 2020. Because of the COVID-19 pandemic and subsequent personal experiences, he decided to split the tour's associated album in two extended plays, Pausa (transl. Pause) and Play; the former was released in May 2020, while the latter was released in May 2022.

Pausa was nominated for Album of the Year and won the award for Best Pop Vocal Album at the 21st Annual Latin Grammy Awards. The second single from the EP, "Tiburones" (transl. "Sharks") reached number one in Argentina and Puerto Rico, and was also nominated for Song of the Year at the 21st Annual Latin Grammy Awards. Martin starred as the voice of villainous miniature figure Don Juan Diego in the American Christmas musical fantasy film Jingle Jangle: A Christmas Journey. The film was released on Netflix on November 13, 2020, and received generally favorable reviews. In April 2021, Martin released his hit single "Canción Bonita" (transl. "Pretty Song") with Colombian singer Carlos Vives, which experienced huge commercial success in Latin America, reaching number one in 12 countries. It was also nominated for Song of the Year and Best Pop Song at the 22nd Annual Latin Grammy Awards. Later that year, he embarked on his first co-headlining tour, the Enrique Iglesias and Ricky Martin Live in Concert alongside Spanish singer Enrique Iglesias. Martin released Play on July 13, 2022. The EP included singles "Otra Noche en L.A." and "A Veces Bien y a Veces Mal"; the former reached number one in four countries.

Martin made a guest appearance, alongside headliner Bad Bunny and Lady Gaga, at the Super Bowl LX halftime show on February 8, 2026; he performed Bad Bunny's song "Lo Que Le Pasó a Hawaii" ("What Happened to Hawaii").

== Artistry ==
=== Influences ===
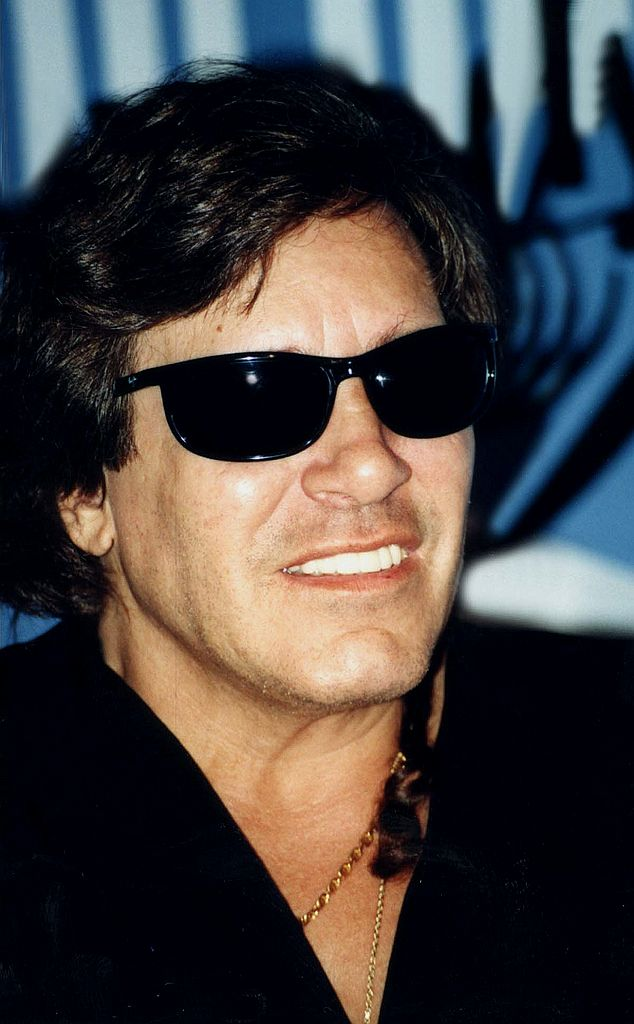
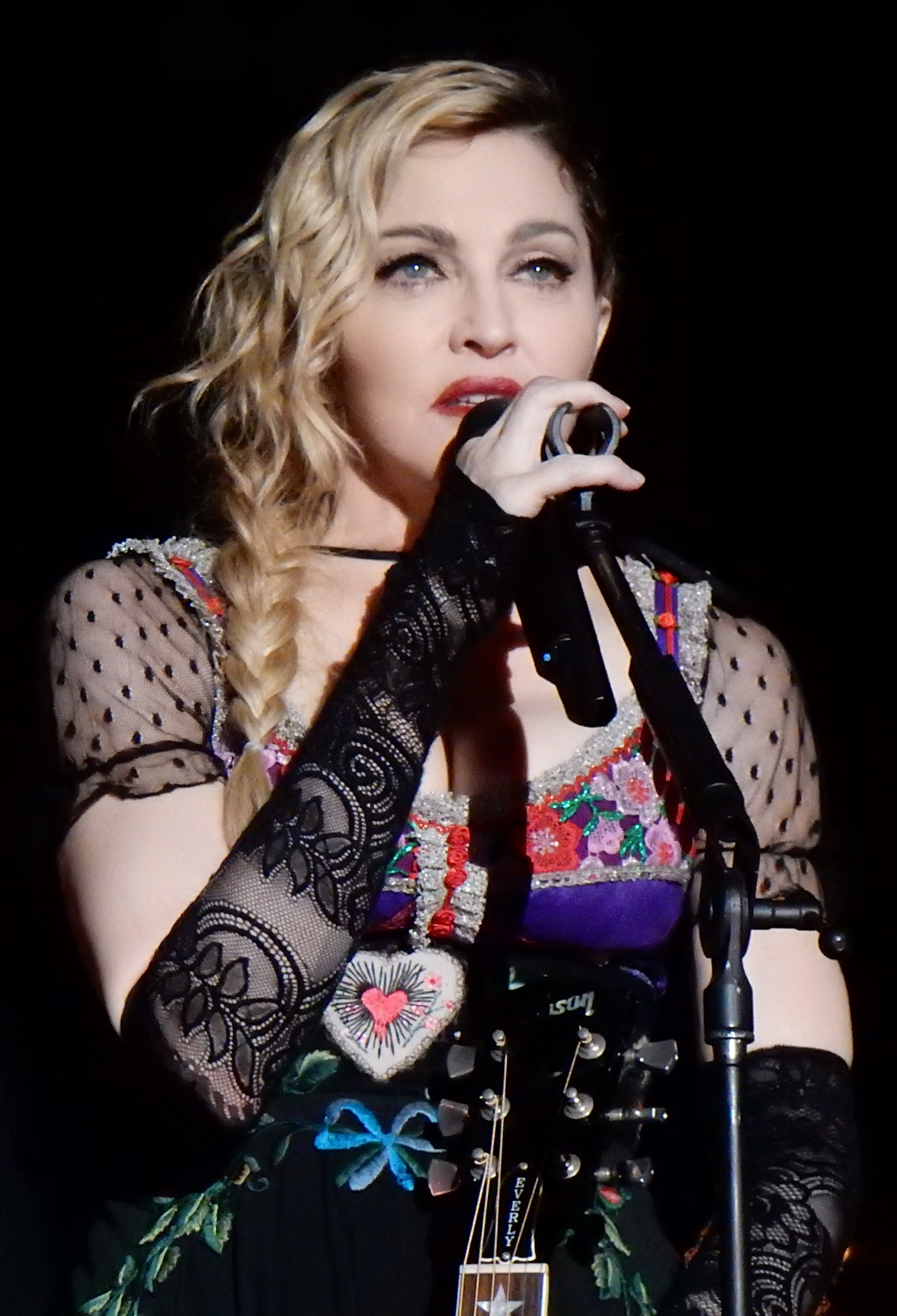
José Feliciano (left) and Madonna (right) have influenced Martin.

As a child, Martin used to sing songs by Menudo and rock bands such as Led Zeppelin, Journey, and REO Speedwagon, which were what his "older siblings were listening to at the time". While Martin and his brothers spent their time listening to classic rock, their mother would interrupt them to make them listen to Latin music. She brought him CDs of Fania All-Stars, Celia Cruz, El Gran Combo de Puerto Rico, and Gilberto Santa Rosa that slowly made him appreciate the richness of Puerto Rican culture. Also, she once took them to a Fania All-Stars concert, which Martin is "beyond grateful" for. He expresses that thanks to her mother, those influences had a "profound effect" on his musical career. Martin has also cited Elvis Presley, the Beatles, Michael Jackson, and Madonna for teaching him "the beauty of pop". He stated about Madonna: "I was very influenced by her and her music. I know every choreography of Madonna." Additionally, he mentions Carlos Santana, José Feliciano, Celia Cruz, and Gloria Estefan as the artists who paved the way for him, naming Feliciano as one of the people who inspired him when he was a teenager: "I was always fascinated with his music." In addition to the musical influences, Martin is inspired by David Bowie's "ambiguous sexuality". While growing up, he used to ask himself if he wanted to be like the openly gay singer Elton John or he just liked him, admiring his music, colors, and wigs. He has also cited Barbra Streisand as an entertainer he wants to be like: "I want to be an entertainer, not just a singer."

=== Musical styles and themes ===
Considered to be a versatile artist, Martin describes his music as Latin pop, saying: "When you say 'Latin pop', the spectrum is so broad, It's inevitable to not be influenced by everything that's happening in the industry, but always keeping your identity firm by knowing who you are." He has also described his music as fusion, while noting that he does not "ride the waves that are in fashion at the moment". Martin sings in Spanish, English, Portuguese, Italian, and French. About his lyrics, Martin has emphasized that although his music will always make the listener dance, it does not mean his lyrics "have to be meaningless" and he sings about love and heartbreak, as well as "things that are good for a society", such as "freedom, freedom of expression, and social justice". He has also declared that as a Latino, he is not afraid of sexuality and sings about sexuality and sensuality, bringing his culture with him onstage.

=== Voice ===
Martin possesses a dramatic tenor vocal range. Peter Gilstrap from Variety commented that his "powerful voice" is "capable of belt or lilt", while The Jerusalem Post's Noa Amouyal described his voice as "soulful" and "very powerful". In 1995, Enrique Lopetegui of the Los Angeles Times noted Martin's "improved vocal skills" on A Medio Vivir. Also from the Los Angeles Times, Ernesto Lechner later praised his vocal for being "charismatic enough to handle both ballads and up-tempo tunes". Similarly, Billboard's Chuck Taylor expressed "She's All I Ever Had" boasts "a versatility that contrasts nicely" with Martin's previous single, "Livin' la Vida Loca", labeling his vocal on the former "tender and heartfelt". Steve Gerrard of the Montreal Rocks complimented "his vocal maturity" on A Quien Quiera Escuchar.

=== Music videos and performances ===
Billboard labeled Martin "a video icon", and ranked him as the 79th Greatest Music Video Artist of All Time in 2020, stating: "From the moment he sashayed up to the mic in 'Livin La Vida Loca' all dressed in black, and gave us that look, the Menudo alum became the most memorable and watchable drop-dead handsome guy in pop music." He has collaborated with various directors to produce his music videos, including Carlos Perez, Wayne Isham, Jessy Terrero, Simón Brand, Gustavo Garzón, Nigel Dick, Kacho Lopez, and Memo del Bosque. "Livin' la Vida Loca" was nominated for Video of the Year at the 1999 MTV Video Music Awards, making Martin the first Latin artist in history to receive a nomination in this category. It won two primary awards for Best Pop Video and Best Dance Video, and was voted three additional awards in the International Viewer's Choice categories, making it rank among the videos with most wins in the history of the MTV Video Music Awards. The explicit sexual scenes of the music video for "She Bangs" were met with criticism from the audience; several American television stations cut the scenes when airing the video. According to the Daily Record's John Dingwall, with the visual, Martin ditched his teen idol image by transforming to a more mature one. It was consequently banned in several Latin American countries, such as the Dominican Republic. Martin told MTV News that the video represented freedom rather than his sexuality. The video was awarded Best Music Video at the 2nd Annual Latin Grammy Awards, Best Clip of the Year — Latin at the 2001 Billboard Music Video Awards, and Video of the Year at the 13th Lo Nuestro Awards.

Martin has been noticed for "dance moves of his own" and his "bon-bon shaking dance moves". He was ranked as the ninth best male dancer by the Evening Standard. Writing for The Hollywood Reporter, Scott Feinberg introduced Martin as "an incredible dancer". Billboard's Jessica Roiz labeled him "a true showman", noting his "many outfit changes", "various dance performances", and "different stage set for each song". Jon Pareles of The New York Times described him as "an all-around showman" and Variety's Peter Gilstrap called him "every inch the showman", both recognizing his vocal abilities, while the former also commented he is "a dancer as muscular and hard-working as anyone in his troupe", mentioning his "likable, good-hearted character" and "steadfast Puerto Rican pride". Music critics have mostly praised his concerts for the choreographies, video screens, visual effects, stage, Latin influences, and Martin's vocals, costume changes, energy, sensuality, dance moves, and gestures, while the quality of sounds and sound mixes have received mixed reviews. Billboard's Marjua Estevez described Martin's performance of "La Copa de la Vida" at the 41st Annual Grammy Awards as "the most memorable Latin performance at a Grammy Awards show", and the publication ranked it as the 54th Greatest Award Show Performance of All Time on their 2017 list. The performance was additionally placed on a 2017 unranked list of "Top 20 Best Grammy Performances of All Time" by Gold Derby, and on a 2019 list of "The Most Unforgettable Grammys Performances of All Time" by InStyle.

== Public image ==
Martin became a teen idol with his debut as a member of Menudo, and a pop icon following global fame as a solo artist. Journalists have written about his humble personality and "beautiful soul". Writing for The Hollywood Reporter, Scott Feinberg introduced Martin as "one of the most acclaimed and admired creative artists ever". La República staff described him as "one of the most admired and desired singers", while authors of ¡Hola! described him as "one of the most respected Latin stars in the world", "one of the most prodigious voices in music in Spanish", and "one of the most beloved talents in the entertainment industry worldwide". Also from ¡Hola!, Cristina Noé named him "one of the most loved artists in the world", while a writer of Clarín named him "one of the most applauded Latin singers on the planet". Metro Puerto Rico stated that he "raised the name of Puerto Rico internationally". He was ranked as one of the top-10 "emerging personalities" of 2010 by Google Zeitgeist. In 2014, Gay Star News referred to Martin as "the most famous Latin pop star in the world", while Variety described him as "Puerto Rico's arguably most famous son" in 2021. He is ranked as the second-most famous Latin music artist in the United States, according to YouGov surveys in 2021.

During the 2000s, Martin was known for "guarding his private life" and being "uncomfortable discussing intimate aspects of his personal life"; he used to insist on asking public to focus on his music and "steered interviewers away from his personal life". However, he chose to live both his "professional and personal life", making his private life public since the early 2010s. In 2021, he went on the cover of People with the title "No More Secrets" and told the magazine that he is "a man with no secrets", stating that he is "more comfortable in his own skin than ever before". Martin is one of the most followed celebrities on social media, with accounts on Instagram, X, Facebook, YouTube, and TikTok. He stated about social media that he wishes he had "something as powerful as" them since his debut: "Obviously I like to have direct contact with the public, with the media. It's extremely important, but today, from my home, I can talk to millions of people and see their immediate reaction." He is noticed for his friendly interactions with his fans, who are called "Sexy Souls". Wax statues of Martin are on display at the Madame Tussauds wax museums in San Francisco, Sydney, and Orlando. The last one was moved from Las Vegas to Orlando for the opening of the museum in spring 2015.

=== Fashion ===
Martin is considered to be a sex symbol, and journalists describe him as "the Latin heartthrob". His fashion and style evolution, from "as '80s as you'd expect" during his time with Menudo to "a style groove, often opting for sharp, tailored suits with clean lines" since 2009, has been noticed by the media. Natalia Trejo from ¡Hola! described him as "one of the most stylish Latin men in the entertainment industry", highlighting his "baggy leather pants", "tailored suits", and "color-block blazers" that have marked "some of the noteworthy trends of each decade". The reviewer also commented that Martin is "an example of mixing business with casual" and has "always had a personal sense of style". JD Institute of Fashion Technology views Martin as a fashion icon, praising him for "pushing the fashion boundaries with every new look". In 1997, he went on the cover of People en Español's first edition of 25 Most Beautiful; he has since "been a constant presence" on their 25 or 50 Most Beautiful lists. Two years later, he was featured on the cover of both Rolling Stone and Time magazines.

Martin is considered to be one of the sexiest men in the world, according to various publications. In 2012, he was voted the sexiest man alive on Broadway.com. The following year, VH1 ranked him as the 28th Sexiest Artist of All Time, stating: "Ricky looks like the model in the magazine ads you stare at in awe thinking, 'There's no way he's that perfect in person'." In 2014, Entertainment Tonight listed him among the Sexiest Men Alive, while Revista Estilo placed him on the list of "the 10 Sexiest Singers" in 2016. He was ranked at number 16 on the list of "the 50 Hottest Men of All Time" by Harper's Bazaar in 2018, being the only Latin man on their list. In 2019, TN described Martin as "the sexiest man in the world". He has been noted for looking younger than his age, with Billboard's Chris Payne labeling him "ageless". The singer has attended several fashion shows, including the Giorgio Armani show at Milan Fashion Week in 2011, the Marc Jacobs show in 2013, the Berluti menswear spring-summer 2020 show at Paris Fashion Week, the Dior men's pre-fall 2020 show, and the Virgil Abloh Spring-Summer 2022 show held by Louis Vuitton.

== Personal life ==
Martin holds dual US and Spanish citizenship.

=== Sexual orientation and early relationships ===
In his early life, Martin had relationships with both men and women. In 2000, American broadcast journalist Barbara Walters asked Martin about his sexuality on national television: "You could stop these rumors. You could say, 'Yes I am gay or no I'm not.'" Martin, who answered with "I just don't feel like it" at the time, later revealed that her question had made him feel "violated", since he "was just not ready to come out" and was "very afraid"; he said that it resulted in "a little fake PTSD" that "still haunts him".

In August 2008, Martin became a father to twin boys born via gestational surrogacy. He explained that he chose surrogacy to become a parent for being "intriguing and faster" than adoption, which was complicated and could take a long time. In March 2010, Martin publicly came out as gay via a message on his website, stating: "I am proud to say that I am a fortunate homosexual man. I am very blessed to be who I am." In an interview with Vanity Fair, he declared: "There was love, passion. I do not regret anything, any of the relationships I lived, they taught me a lot, both men and women." Martin also told Fama!: "I know that I like both men and women, I'm against sexual labels, we are simply human beings with emotional and sexual needs. I like to enjoy sex in total freedom, so I'm open to having sex with a woman if I feel desire." Despite this, he expressed that he would not be interested in "an ongoing relationship with a woman", stating: "Men are my thing". Martin dated Puerto Rican economist Carlos González Abella from 2010 to 2014, as his first public relationship with a man after coming out as gay.

=== Marriage ===
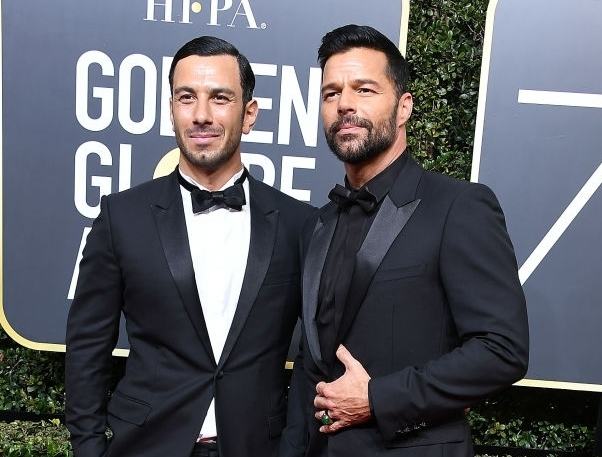
Martin and Jwan Yosef at the 2018 Golden Globe Awards

Syrian-Swedish painter Jwan Yosef shared a photo of himself and Martin on Instagram on March 30, 2016, with the caption: "Obviously we're starting a band." In January 2018, Martin confirmed that he had secretly married Yosef: "I'm a husband..." On December 31, 2018, they announced that they had welcomed a daughter. In September 2019, while accepting an award at the 23rd annual Human Rights Campaign (HRC) National Dinner, he announced that they were expecting their fourth child. On October 29, 2019, he announced the birth of a son. As with his twins, Martin's subsequent children were also born via surrogacy. In July 2023, Martin and Yosef announced they had separated and were divorcing after six years of marriage.

=== Beliefs and religion ===
During an interview with People in 2002, Martin expressed that he believes in "love", "the power of healing", and "God", thanks to his parents. The name he chose for his son Matteo means "gift from God". According to his statements in a 2021 interview, he still believes in God. He was raised Catholic and said he is not "the person who would ever look down upon one religion". He expressed that he also admires and likes Buddhist philosophy.

=== Real estate ===
In March 2001, Martin purchased a 7,082 ft^{2} (658 m^{2}) house in Miami Beach for $6.4 million; he sold the unit for $10.6 million in 2005. In September 2004, he paid $11.9 million for an 11,000-square-foot Mediterranean-style villa in Los Angeles, which he sold in 2006 for $15 million. In May 2005, he purchased a 9,491-square-foot house in Miami Beach for $10 million; he sold the villa for $10.6 million in 2012. In 2007, he paid $16.2 million for a mansion in Golden Beach. He sold the property in 2012 for $12.8 million, incurring a loss. In the same year, he bought a 3,147-square-foot condominium in New York City for $5.9 million; he sold the condo for $7.1 million in 2017.

In 2014, he rented a 900-square-metre mansion in Sydney, which became famous as "the Bronte Wave House" and was sold for $16 million in May 2015, marking one of the most expensive properties sold in the city that year. In December 2016, he purchased an 11,300-square-foot mansion in Beverly Hills. The estate, which is Martin's current house, has seven bedrooms and eight bathrooms with outdoor seating areas scattered throughout 33,000 square feet. It is a "private getaway in the middle of the city", located up the street from the Beverly Hills Hotel. Martin also owns a property in Puerto Rico and a private 19.7-acre island in Brazil. He purchased the latter for $8 million in 2008.

=== Net worth ===
In 2022, La Nación estimated his net worth at US$130 million.

== Legacy and influence ==
Martin has been regarded as the "King of Latin Pop" by various publications, such as the Grammy Awards, Billboard, Rolling Stone, Time, People, Vogue, The Independent, Entertainment Weekly, Entertainment Tonight Canada, NBC News, and ABC News. Additionally, he has been referred to as the "King of Latin Music", the "Latin Pop God", the "Latin King of Pop", the "Latin American King of Pop", the "Latin King", the "Crossover Latin King", the "Puerto Rican Pop King", the "Salsa-Pop King", and the "King of World Cup". Martin is known as one of the most influential artists in the world. Billboard ranked him as one of the 30 Most Influential Latin Artists of All Time, while NBC News introduced him as an "influential Latin celebrity". In 2014, he won the award for the most influential international artist at the 18th China Music Awards. He was ranked among "25 musicians who broke barriers" by Stacker in 2019, while in 2020, Spin ranked him at number 27 on the list of "most influential artists of the past 35 years", as the only Latin artist on their list. In 2022, Show News named him "the most influential global artist in history".

Martin's song "María (Pablo Flores Remix)", which was ranked among the "Greatest Latin Pop Song of All Time" by Rolling Stone, and "11 remixes of classic Latin hits" by Billboard, "launched the Latin and dance music crossover of the '90s", according to the latter. Olivier Pérou from Le Point commented that "some have even learned, thanks to him, to count to three in Spanish" following the popularity of the song. "La Copa de la Vida", which has been hailed as the Best World Cup Anthem of All-Time by multiple sources, became a "musical template" for World Cup anthems, and Martin's Latin and dance crossover style has been much copied in the anthems, as well as soccer chant "Ole! Ole! Ole!" in the lyrics, according to The Hollywood Reporter. As believed by Esquire, the song "inaugurated this musical subgenre" of Latin. Joy Bhattacharjya from The Economic Times wrote about "La Copa de la Vida" that it was the first World Cup anthem to have a video just "as ubiquitous as the song", going on to write: "Since then, official songs have an important part to play in every World Cup." In his review for Pitchfork, Corban Goble wrote that if World Cup anthems someday would be "given their own textbook", "La Copa de la Vida" would be "the standard-bearer for the whole genre".

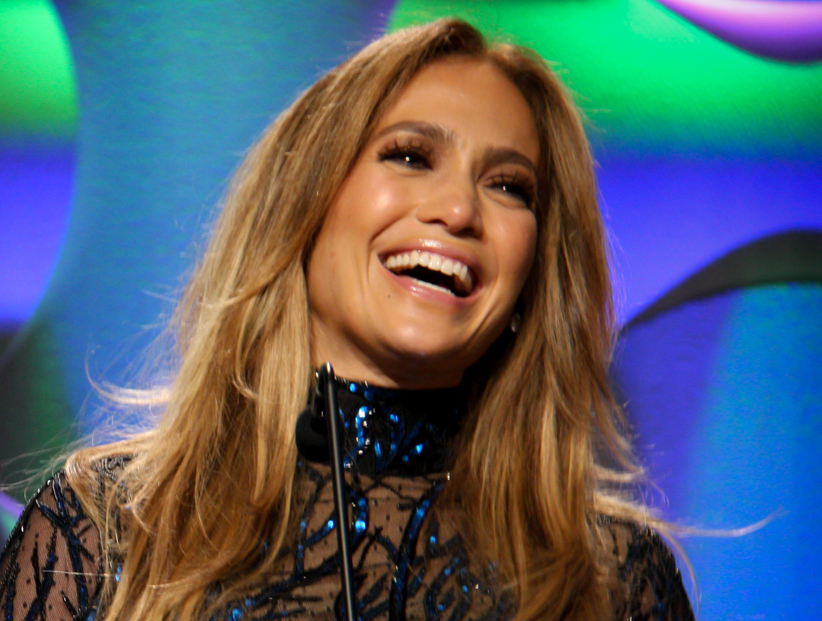
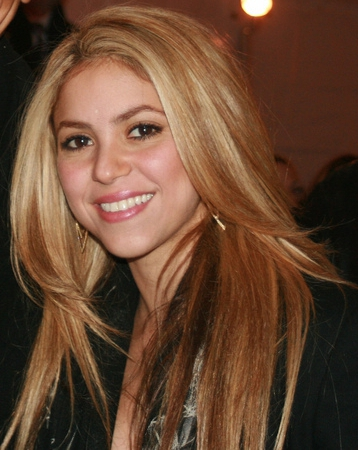
Martin opened the doors for many Latin artists, such as Jennifer Lopez (left) and Shakira (right) to top the charts beyond the Spanish-speaking markets.

Martin is known as the pioneer in getting Latin pop music genre to mainstream recognition. Following his performance of "The Cup of Life" at the Grammys, and the success of "Livin' la Vida Loca" and Ricky Martin (1999), he opened the gates for many Latin artists such as Jennifer Lopez, Shakira, Christina Aguilera, Marc Anthony, Santana, and Enrique Iglesias who released their crossover albums and followed him onto the top of the charts. His performance of "The Cup of Life" at the Grammys not only changed the course of his career, but also altered how people regard Latin music in America. It has been known as a game-changer for Latin music worldwide, that effectively ushered in the "Latin explosion". Then-United Talent Agency head Rob Prinz described the rendition as "the single biggest game changing moment for any artist in the history of the Grammys". According to Billboard, it has been cited as the beginning of the "Latin Pop invasion", which powerfully affected the US mainstream. Jesús Triviño Alarcón from Tidal Magazine stated, "that single performance opened up the mainstream market for the Latinx legends", mentioning the names of Anthony, Shakira, and Lopez. InStyle staff wrote about it: "With his leather pants, big smile and energetic performance of 'The Cup of Life', Ricky Martin almost personally kicked off the so-called Latin Explosion of the late '90s." Mariana Best of San Antonio Express-News commented that the performance "is recognized for bringing Latin pop to the forefront of the U.S. music scene". In 2018, Diego Urdaneta from Vice credited the song as "one of those that laid the first stones so that J Balvin and Bad Bunnys of today can be at the top of the pyramid", labeling it "a milestone for Latin music".

According to Entertainment Tonight, "Livin' la Vida Loca" paved the way for a large number of other Latin artists, and is "credited as the song that helped other Latin artists break through to English-speaking markets". As believed by Spin, the song "lit the fuse for the Latin pop explosion of the '90s". Lucas Villa from Spin wrote about it: "When the world went loca for Ricky, he led the way for other Latin music superstars like Spain's Enrique Iglesias, Colombia's Shakira and Nuyoricans like Jennifer Lopez and Marc Anthony to make their marks beyond the Spanish-speaking crowds." He also described Martin as "a trailblazer in globalizing Latinx culture" in his Grammy.com article. Also from Grammy.com, Ernesto Lechner described "Livin' la Vida Loca" as "the manifesto for all the fun-loving, tropically tinged Latin hit singles that followed", stating that Martin led "the Latin music explosion that took over the U.S. at the tail end of the '90s". According to The Independent, the single is "widely regarded as the song that began the first Latin pop explosion". People's Jason Sheeler credited it as the song that "led the way for the late-'90s so-called 'Latin explosion' that dominated pop music into the new century: Shakira, Enrique Iglesias, Marc Anthony, and Jennifer Lopez".

Angie Romero from Billboard wrote: "If you look up 'crossover' in the dictionary, there should be a photo of Ricky shaking his bon bon and/or 'Livin' la Vida Loca'." Leila Cobo named "Livin' la Vida Loca" one of the genre's biggest singles of the past 50 years in his 2021 book Decoding "Despacito": An Oral History of Latin Music. She also wrote about his impact in Shakira's "Whenever, Wherever" chapter: "Ricky Martin's phenomenal success opened the door for a string of Latin artists who waved the flags of their heritage, but who sang in English." Additionally, she compared Martin's song with Luis Fonsi's "Despacito" (2017) in one of her Billboard articles: "'Livin', like 'Despacito', became not just a global hit but a cultural phenomena that transcended all barriers of language and nationality." In another article, she described it as the song that "ignited the late-'90s Latin explosion". Also from Billboard, Gary Trust wrote: "The song helmed a Latin pop boom in the U.S., with Jenner Lopez, Marc Anthony and others crossing over, as well." Writing for LiveAbout.com, Bill Lamb credited the song as "the record which kicked off a wave of major Latin performers hitting the pop mainstream".

"Twenty-one years ago Puerto Rican heartthrob Ricky Martin led the Latin explosion with the release of his English-language self-titled album."

— Billboard's Lucas Villa in 2020.

Jim Farber from Daily News noted that Ricky Martin "provides a textbook example of how to mix Latin beats with pop tunes and rock intonations". St. Louis Post-Dispatch critic Kevin C. Johnson described Martin as Latin music's "pretty-faced poster boy" who is "taking the music to places Jon Secada, Selena and Santana never could". He also mentioned that even "Gloria Estefan at her peak, failed to muster up the kind of hype and hoopla surrounding Martin". Celia San Miguel of Tidal Magazine stated that Martin "highlighted the public's thirst for a different kind of pop" in 1999, noting the album's "fusion-heavy" and "hip-shaking rhythms associated with Latin music". She mentioned that the album "spawned 1999's Latin music boom", emphasizing the fact that Martin created the "spark" of the "Latin Pop Explosion", which was followed by 1999 albums, On the 6 by Lopez, Enrique by Iglesias, and Anthony's eponymous album. She continued crediting "Martin and the paths he created" responsible for the Latin music and Spanish and Spanglish lyrics being "a commonplace phenomenon on English-language radio" in 2019. In her review for Grammy.com, Ana Monroy Yglesias said Martin led a "major music moment in 1999" with Ricky Martin, and along with him, "the first major boom of Spanish-language artists", such as Shakira and Lopez, came into the "U.S. pop landscape".

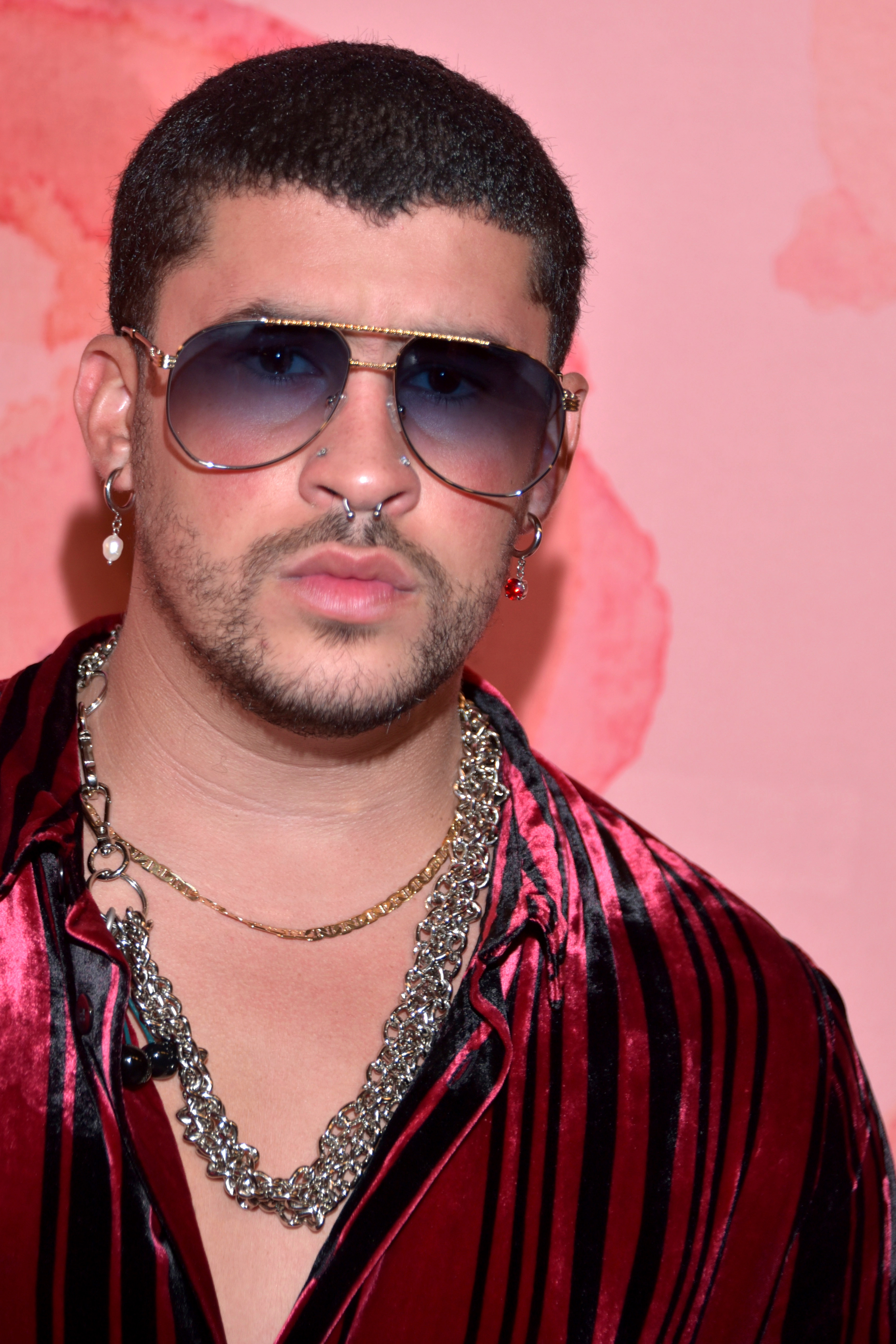
Bad Bunny (pictured) has been inspired by Martin since he "was a kid and one of the reasons was that passion and energy he has".

The late '90s Latin explosion also resulted in the launch of the Latin Recording Academy. Gabriel Abaroa Jr., the president and chief executive officer of the Latin Recording Academy, expressed that the plan of its launch was "immediately after the Ricky Martin success". Cuban American musician and producer Emilio Estefan added: "After the success with Ricky Martin, everybody opened their eyes and realized how important it was to bring diversity and multiethnic elements into [mainstream American] music." Many artists have cited Martin as an influence or declared themselves as his fan, including Abraham Mateo, Bad Bunny, Camila Cabello, Camilo, Carla Morrison, Christian Chávez, CNCO, Danna Paola, Enrique Iglesias, J Balvin, J-Hope, Jimin, Karol G, India Martínez, Luis Fonsi, Maite Perroni, Maluma, Neha Mahajan, Pedro Capó, Prince Royce, Rauw Alejandro, Rosalía, Sebastián Ligarde, Sebastián Yatra, Shakira, Tini, Vadhir Derbez, William Hung, and Wisin.

Both Maluma and J Balvin have described Martin as a "teacher" and credited him as an artist who "opened the doors" for them, while Maluma has also expressed: "Ricky Martin is one of the artists I wanted to be growing up. He's my idol in the industry". Puerto Rican singer Bad Bunny talked about Martin's legacy during an episode of Behind the Music: "There's no doubt that he opened the door for an entire generation of Latin artists. I am doing great things today in the music industry thanks to those doors that he opened." He also mentioned that he is inspired by Martin's coming out as gay: "You don't have to be gay to be inspired by that action of honesty and freedom, of being yourself against the world despite everything you deserve. I look at it like a very inspiring moment for anybody. At least for me, it's very inspirational." Brazilian singer-songwriter Anitta explained to The Guardian that "some Latin stars such as Maluma and Bad Bunny sing in their native language" and do not need to sing in English to get noticed, because they already had representatives like Shakira, Martin, and Jennifer Lopez, but since her country "hasn't had a major international pop star before", she uses "whatever language will get the market's attention".

=== Portrayal in television ===
In July 2019, SOMOS Productions, Endemol Shine Boomdog, and Piñolywood Studios announced the production of a biographical web television series about Menudo, titled Subete a Mi Moto. Consisting of 15 episodes of 60 minutes each, the series premiered on Amazon Prime Video on October 9, 2020 in Mexico, Latin America, and Spain. It was filmed in Mexico and Puerto Rico, and Martin was portrayed by actors Felipe Albors and Ethan Schwartz. The series premiered in the United States on February 14, 2021 on Estrella TV. On the review aggregation website Tomatazos, the first season has a positive score of 75%. The website's critical consensus summary states, "A good trip to the past that recalls a band that defined the youth of a certain public, but that doesn't ignore the darkest moments in the lives of its members."

== Books ==
Martin published his memoir, Me, on November 2, 2010. He expressed that writing the book was "one of the reasons" he decided to come out earlier that year. The book also had a Spanish edition title Yo (transl. Me), which was published simultaneously by Celebra. Me spent several weeks at number one on the New York Times Best Seller list. Martin's first children's book Santiago the Dreamer in Land Among the Stars was published by Celebra and illustrated by Patricia Castelao in November 2013 for ages between five and nine. Its Spanish-language edition, Santiago El Soñador en Entre Las Estrellas, was published simultaneously. Martin expressed that the book was inspired by his "personal life, with fantasy added to it", as well as "a lot of cartoons".

== Activism ==
=== Philanthropy ===
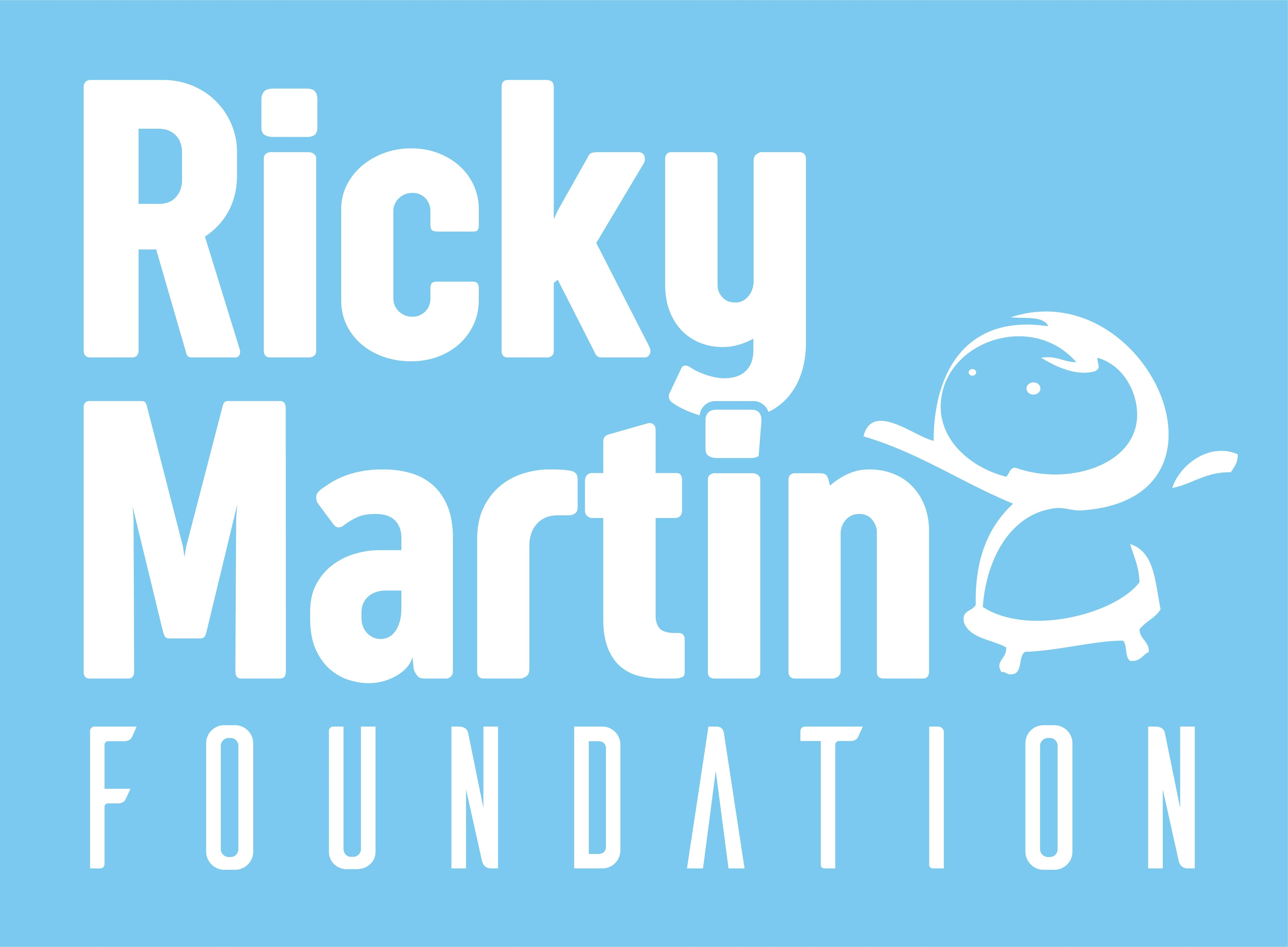
The Ricky Martin Foundation logo

In 2004, Martin launched the Ricky Martin Foundation, a non-profit, non-governmental organization that focuses on human trafficking. In January 2005, following the 2004 Indian Ocean earthquake and tsunami, Martin visited Thailand to assess the needs of the minor survivors who were "extremely vulnerable to traffickers". Later that year, the Ricky Martin Foundation signed an alliance in partnership with Habitat for Humanity to construct 224 homes for the tsunami-affected families. The project was completed in December 2006. In March 2006, the foundation collaborated with the International Organization for Migration in the Llama y Vive (transl. Call and Live) campaign, which focuses on facilitating "the prevention of human trafficking and the protection of young people, victims of child trafficking and prosecution of traffickers". In 2012, the foundation participated in the making of the Child Protection Model Law on the International Centre for Missing & Exploited Children.

In July 2005, Martin visited Jordan as a UNICEF Goodwill Ambassador and served as a guest of honour at the 25th Arab Children's Congress in Amman, held under the patronage of Queen Noor of Jordan. The congress brought together young participants from Arab countries, Asia and Europe to promote dialogue and cultural understanding. Tunisian singer Latifa also attended the event as a guest of honour alongside Martin. During his visit, Martin met with youth delegates and participated in activities supporting children's rights and cross-cultural exchange, in addition to visiting child-protection initiatives in Jordan such as the (Dar al-Aman child safety centre), run by the Jordan River Foundation founded by Queen Rania of Jordan.

=== Politics ===
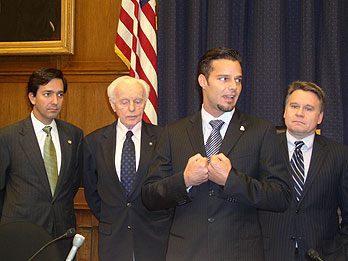
Martin (mid-right) with members of Congress in 2006: Luis Fortuño (far left), Tom Lantos (mid-left) and Chris Smith (far right)

On January 20, 2001, during the first inauguration of George W. Bush, Martin performed "The Cup of Life" and danced with him. Martin's view of Bush changed over the Iraq War, as expressed in his declaration to BBC News that he will "always condemn war and those who promulgate it". At the 2010 Billboard Latin Music Awards, Martin expressed his disagreement with the Arizona SB 1070 bill, a proposed law that would have required police officers to request documents from individuals whom they suspected to be illegal immigrants. Martin has supported Democratic presidential candidates Barack Obama, Hillary Clinton, and Joe Biden. In May 2021, Martin demonstrated his support for the Ni una menos movement, condemning femicides and violence against women in Puerto Rico, and calling on authorities to protect women.

In October 2024, Martin endorsed Kamala Harris for president after a rally held by former U.S. president Donald Trump at Madison Square Garden, in which comedian Tony Hinchcliffe compared Puerto Rico to a "floating island of garbage in the middle of the ocean".

=== LGBT advocacy ===
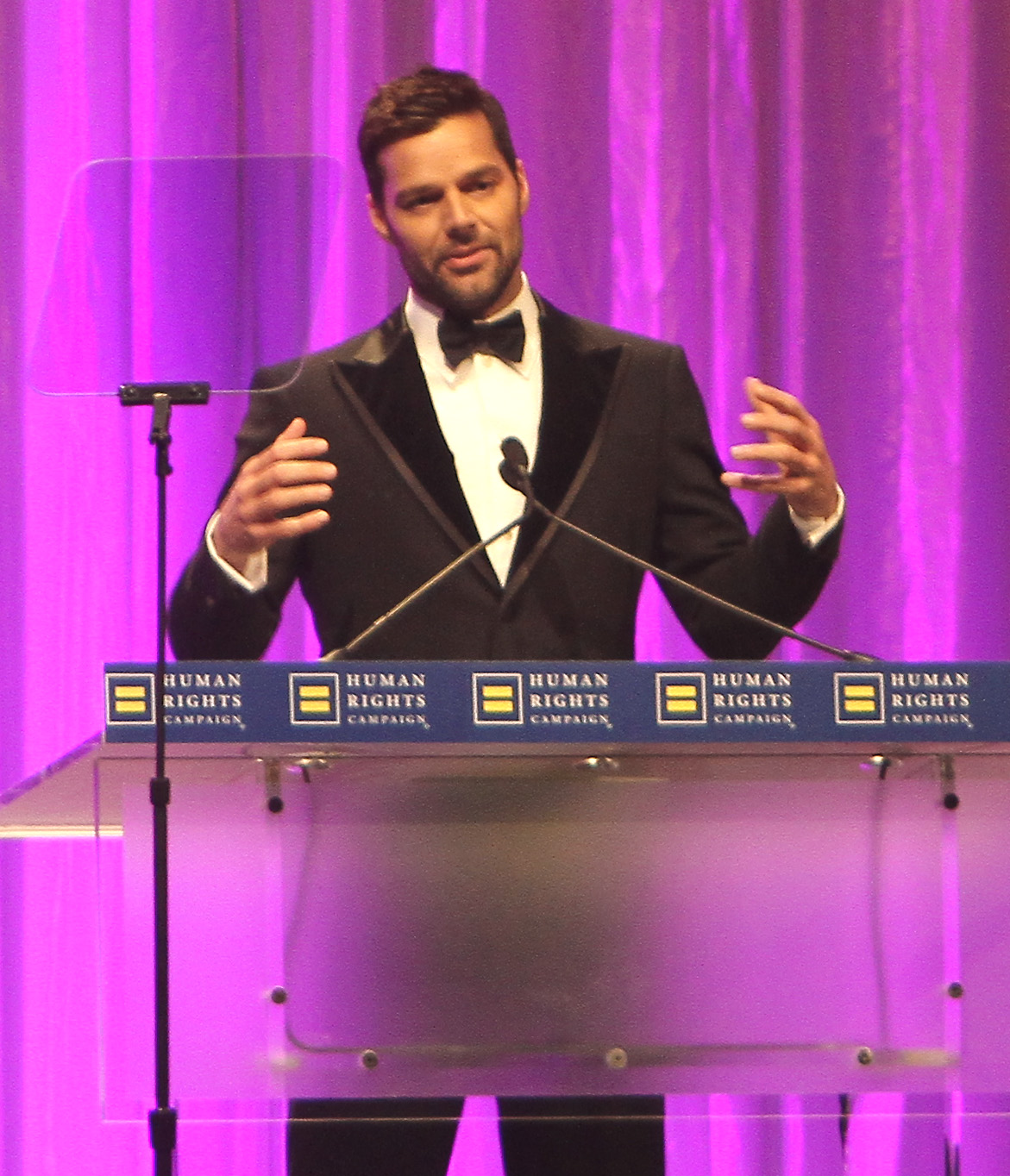
Martin giving a speech at the 14th Annual Human Rights Campaign in 2010

As a gay man, Martin actively supports LGBT rights worldwide since his coming out in 2010. Even before coming out, he was noted by the mainstream media for being popular among gay men and having a large gay fan base. He also went on the cover of the American LGBTQ-interest magazine The Advocate in July 1999. Despite this, he admitted that he felt homosexuality was evil since he was raised as a Catholic and targeted his anger toward others, especially gay men: "I was very angry, very rebellious. I used to look at gay men and think, 'I'm not like that, I don't want to be like that, that's not me.' I was ashamed." He added that he "had internalized homophobia" back then. He is currently considered to be a gay icon, with PinkNews labeling him "a strong advocate of LGBT rights" who "expressed support for equal marriage" since coming out.

As the first mainstream Latin music artist to come out, Martin's coming out was a game-changer for "Latin Pride". Billboard's Lucas Villa stated: "With Martin's announcement, gay artists, who had long kept their sexual identities a secret, finally had a beacon of hope. If Martin could come out with his career unscathed, there was hope for other artists in Latin music to start doing the same." He added that since then, "a growing number of Latin artists have either come out after years in the spotlight, or many have simply started their careers by embracing their gay identities". Suzy Exposito from Rolling Stone argued that with risking his career and coming out, Martin "set the scene for Bad Bunny to be free in many ways that, during his own breakthrough moment, he could not".

In June 2019, he published an open letter slamming a religious liberty bill, saying: "As a defender of human rights and a member of the LGBTT [sic] community, I am vehemently opposed to the proposed measure imposed upon us under the guise of religious freedom, that projects us to the world as a backwards country." Puerto Rico's then-governor backed down and withdrew his support of the bill following Martin's statement.

Several of Martin's music videos feature diversity in sexual orientations and same-sex couples, including "The Best Thing About Me Is You", "Disparo al Corazón", "Fiebre", and "Tiburones". For his activism and advocacy for LGBTQ community, Martin has been honored with numerous accolades, including the GLAAD Vito Russo Award, the Gala Vanguard Award by the Los Angeles LGBT Center, the International Icon Award by the British LGBT Awards, the National Visibility Award by the Human Rights Campaign, the Trailblazer Award by the LGBT Center Dinner, the Celebrity Activist of the Year by LGBTQ Nation, and the Legacy Award by Attitude Awards.

== Recognition ==
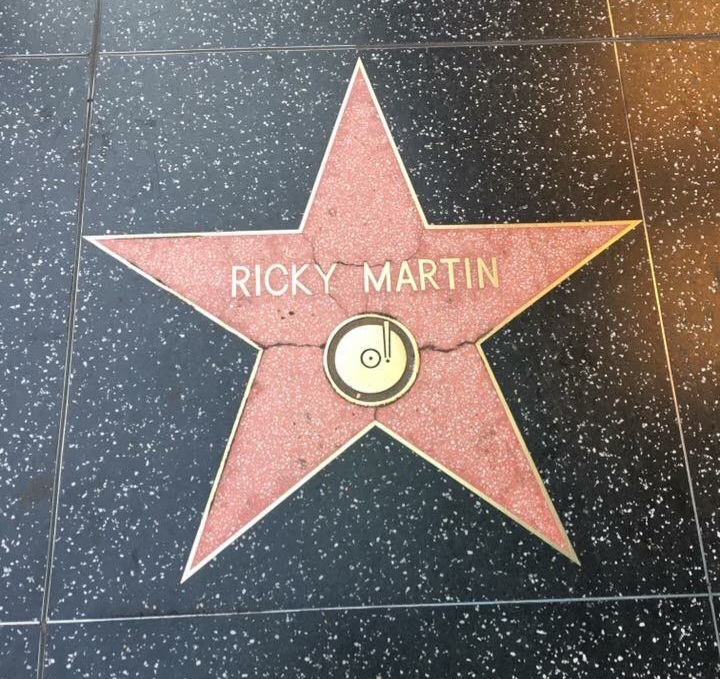
Martin's star on the Hollywood Walk of Fame

Throughout his career, Martin has won over 200 awards (most awarded male Latin artist), including two Grammy Awards, five Latin Grammy Awards, five MTV Video Music Awards (tied for most wins by a Latin artist), two American Music Awards, three Latin American Music Awards, three Billboard Music Awards, a Billboard Music Video Award, nine Billboard Latin Music Awards, eight World Music Awards, fourteen Lo Nuestro Awards (including the Excellence Award), and a Guinness World Record. As an actor, he was nominated for an Emmy Award. In 2007, Martin was honored with a star on the Hollywood Walk of Fame, located at 6901 Hollywood Blvd.

On October 11, 2007, then-mayor of Miami Beach, Florida David Dermer awarded him the key to the city of Miami Beach. Puerto Rico named August 31 the "International Ricky Martin Day" in 2008. The Government of Spain granted Spanish nationality to Martin in 2011, for being "recognized in different artistic facets". In 2018, in recognition of "his dedication to the island and people of Puerto Rico, his philanthropic work to eliminate human trafficking across the Caribbean, and his commitment to the arts", the singer received a proclamation naming June 7 the "Ricky Martin Day" in New York City. Throughout his career, Martin has sold over 70 million records making him one of the best-selling Latin music artists of all time.

== Discography ==
Solo studio albums

- Ricky Martin (1991)
- Me Amaras (1993)
- A Medio Vivir (1995)
- Vuelve (1998)
- Ricky Martin (1999)
- Sound Loaded (2000)
- Almas del Silencio (2003)
- Life (2005)
- Música + Alma + Sexo (2011)
- A Quien Quiera Escuchar (2015)

== Filmography ==
- Alcanzar una estrella II (1991)
- Hercules (Note: Latin American dub) (1997)
- Idle Hands (1999)
- Minions (Note: Latin American dub) (2015)
- The Assassination of Gianni Versace: American Crime Story (2018)
- Jingle Jangle: A Christmas Journey (2020)
- Palm Royale (2024)

== Theatre ==
- Mama Ama el Rock (1990), México City
- Les Misérables (1996), Broadway – Marius Pontmercy
- Evita (2012), Broadway – Ché

== Tours and residencies ==
Headlining tours

- Ricky Martin Tour (1992)
- Me Amaras Tour (1993–1994)
- A Medio Vivir Tour (1995–1997)
- Vuelve World Tour (1998)
- Livin' la Vida Loca Tour (1999–2000)
- One Night Only with Ricky Martin (2005–2006)
- Black and White Tour (2007)
- Música + Alma + Sexo World Tour (2011)
- Ricky Martin Live (2013–2014)
- Live in Mexico (2014)
- One World Tour (2015–2018)
- Ricky Martin en Concierto (2018–2019)
- Movimiento Tour (2020–2022)
- Sinfónico Tour (2022–2023)
- Ricky Martin Live! Australia (2025)

Co-headlining tours

- Enrique Iglesias and Ricky Martin Live in Concert (with Enrique Iglesias) (2021)
- The Trilogy Tour (with Enrique Iglesias & Pitbull) (2023)

Residency

- All In (2017–2018)

== See also ==
- Honorific nicknames in popular music
- List of artists who reached number one in the United States
- List of artists who reached number one on the UK Singles Chart
- List of best-selling Latin music artists
- List of Latin pop artists
- List of multilingual bands and artists
- List of Puerto Rican Grammy Award winners and nominees
- List of Puerto Ricans
- List of Urbano artists
