= List of songs recorded by Ricky Martin =

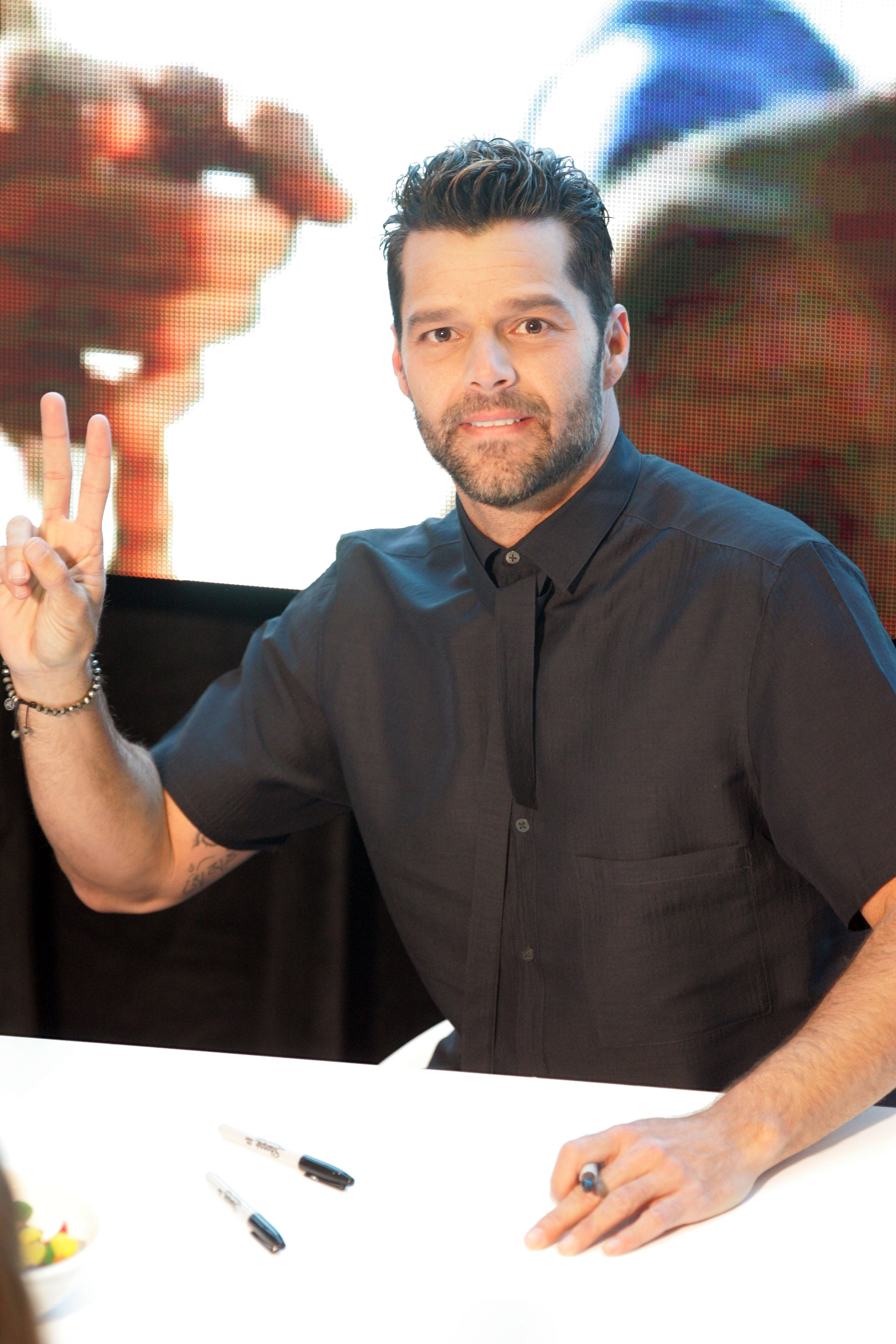
Ricky Martin in Sydney, Australia, 2014

Puerto Rican singer Ricky Martin has recorded material for ten studio albums and sang songs in Spanish, English, Italian and Portuguese; he has also recorded bilingual tracks. He began his career aged 12, in 1984, as a lead singer of the band Menudo. Five years later he left the band and pursued a solo career, releasing his debut eponymous studio album in 1991. On the Spanish record, he collaborated with various songwriters and composers; "Fuego Contra Fuego", the lead single, was written by Carlos Goméz and Mariano Perez, while on "El Amor de Mi Vida" he worked with Eddie Sierra. On the record, he also sang a Spanish version of Larry Williams' 1957 single "Bony Moronie", titled "Popotitos".

In 1995, Martin teamed up with former band member, Robi Draco Rosa (Note: Rosa was credited as Ian Blake in the official booklet of A Medio Vivir) to work on his third studio album, A Medio Vivir, a record influenced by rock music and combined with Latin styles such as flamenco and cumbia. With Rosa's help several songs were penned for the record, including, "Fuego de Noche, Nieve de Día", "Volverás" and "María". The latter became a hit and was remixed as a bilingual English-Spanish version, released in 1998. Martin's fourth studio album, Vuelve, established his commercial music career in the United States. On it, Martin again worked with Rosa and other songwriters including Luis Gómez-Escolar and K.C. Porter. "La Copa de la Vida (The Cup of Life)" penned by Escolar and Rosa together with Desmond Child became a worldwide hit and the official song of the 1998 FIFA World Cup.

In 1999, Martin released "Livin' la Vida Loca", a track co-written by Rosa, Child, and Escolar; it became a worldwide success and Martin's best-selling single. It was succeeded by Martin's second eponymous studio album and his first English recording, that same year. Rosa and Child also co-wrote other songs on the album including, "Spanish Eyes" and "I Am Made of You". Madonna co-wrote and was featured on "Be Careful (Cuidado Con Mi Corazón)", a track penned and produced by William Orbit. The next year, the singer released his sixth overall and second English album, Sound Loaded (2000). Once again, Child and Rosa were involved in the writing process having done "She Bangs" and "Saint Tropez". Child, alongside Gary Burr and Victoria Shaw, penned the ballad, "Nobody Wants to Be Lonely", which was later remixed with additional vocals from Christina Aguilera.

Almas del Silencio, Martin's seventh studio album, was released in 2003. For the Spanish record, Antonio Rayo, José Miguel Velásquez and Jodi Marr co-wrote, "Jaleo", which was recorded in both Spanish and Spanglish versions. Following a two-year break, in 2005, Martin released his third English album, Life. On the record, he worked with producer Scott Storch who co-wrote, "I Don't Care", a song that featured rapper Fat Joe and singer Amerie. He collaborated with Diane Warren who co-wrote the ballad, "Stop Time Tonight". Martin's recording sessions with will.i.am resulted in two songs for the album, "It's Alright" and "Drop It on Me".

Martin's ninth studio album, Música + Alma + Sexo, was released in early 2011. A bilingual Spanish-English album, it was predominantly a dance and "lite-pop" record. Martin and Child co-wrote all the songs on the album, which featured recording artists Joss Stone on "The Best Thing About Me Is You" and Claudia Leitte on "Samba", a Portuguese recording. In 2014, he collaborated with Wisin and Jennifer Lopez on the song, "Adrenalina", which was released in two versions, Spanish and Spanglish. He sang "Vida" in Spanish, Portuguese and Spanglish; the latter version was part of the One Love, One Rhythm compilation. His tenth studio album, A Quien Quiera Escuchar was released in 2015; this Latin pop record also featured such artists as Rayo, Yotuel Romero, and Pedro Capó.

== Songs ==
Key
†	Indicates bilingual recording
#	Indicates English-language recording
‡	Indicates Italian-language recording
§	Indicates Portuguese-language recording
*	Indicates Spanish-language recording

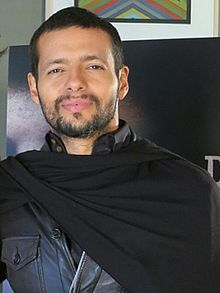
Robi Draco Rosa has been a frequent collaborator of Martin since the beginning of his solo career.

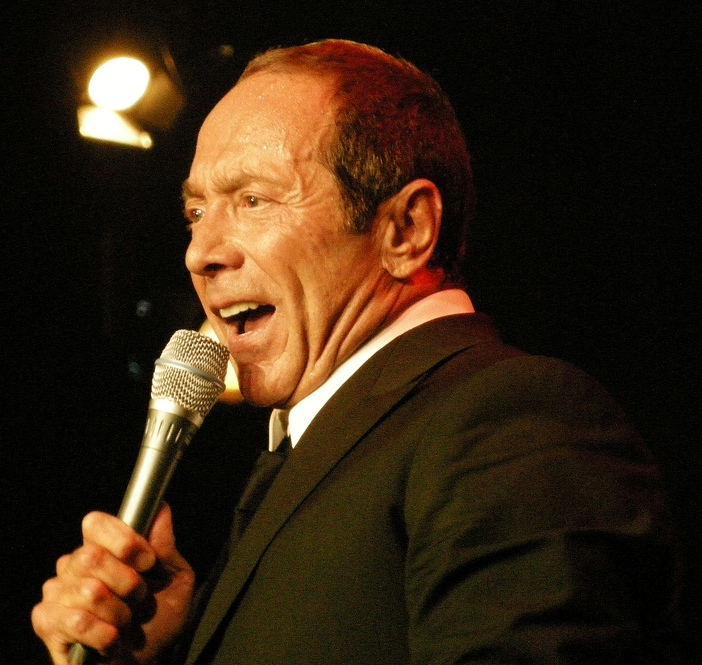
Canadian singer Paul Anka and Martin have recorded a Spanglish version of Anka's 1957 single "Diana".

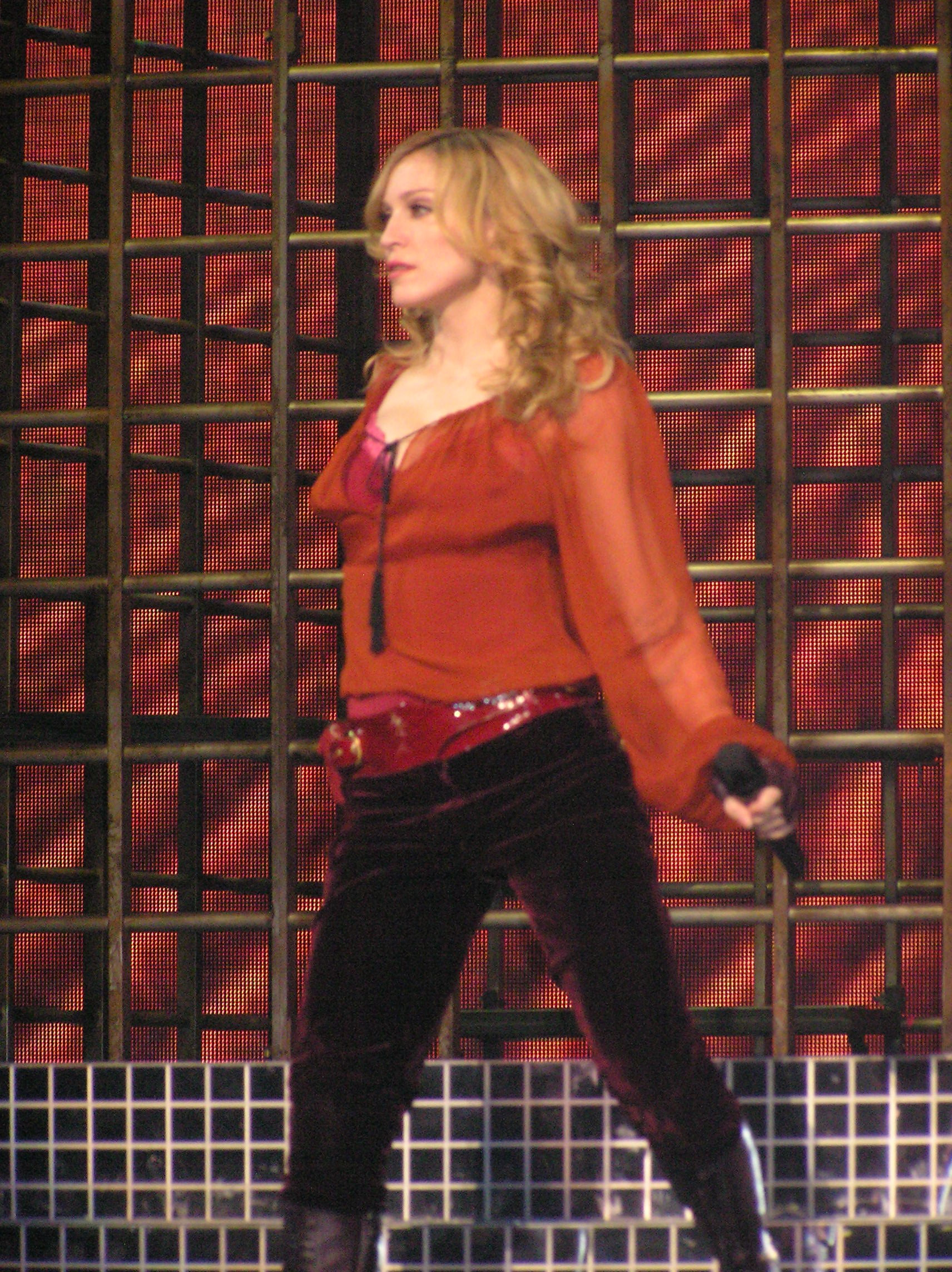
Madonna co-wrote and provided vocals on "Be Careful (Cuidado Con Mi Corazón)".

American country singer Victoria Shaw co-penned the ballad "Nobody Wants to Be Lonely".

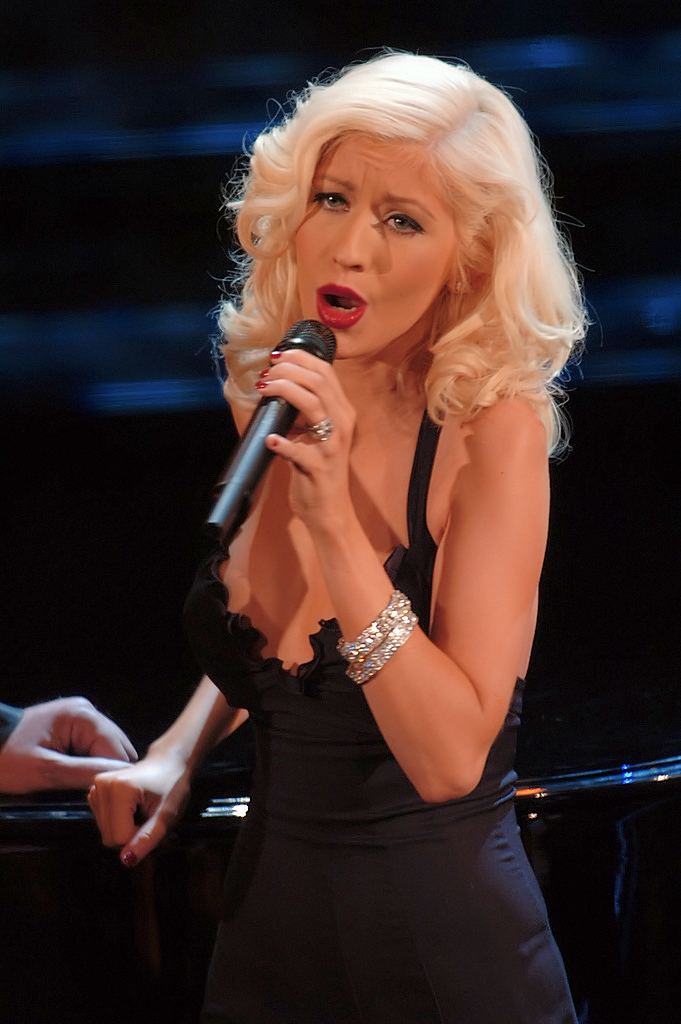
"Nobody Wants to Be Lonely" was remixed with additional vocals from Christina Aguilera.

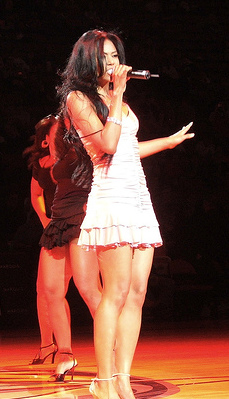
Singer Amerie was featured on "I Don't Care".

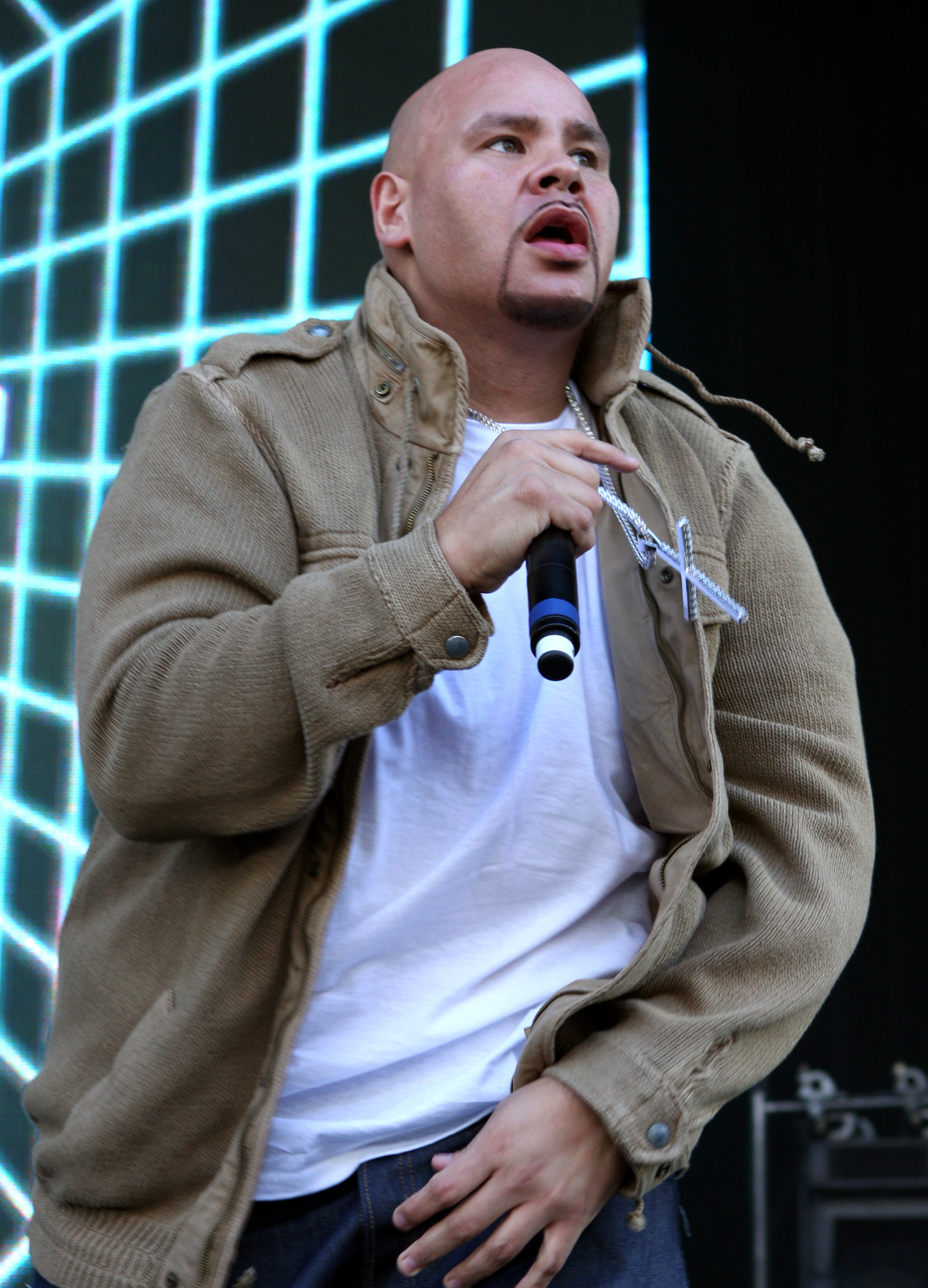
Fat Joe co-wrote and rapped a verse on "I Don't Care".

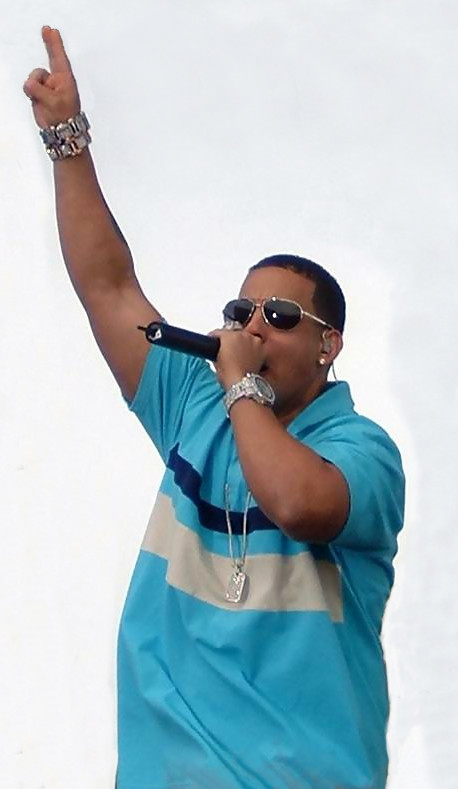
Rapper Daddy Yankee rapped a verse on "Drop It on Me"

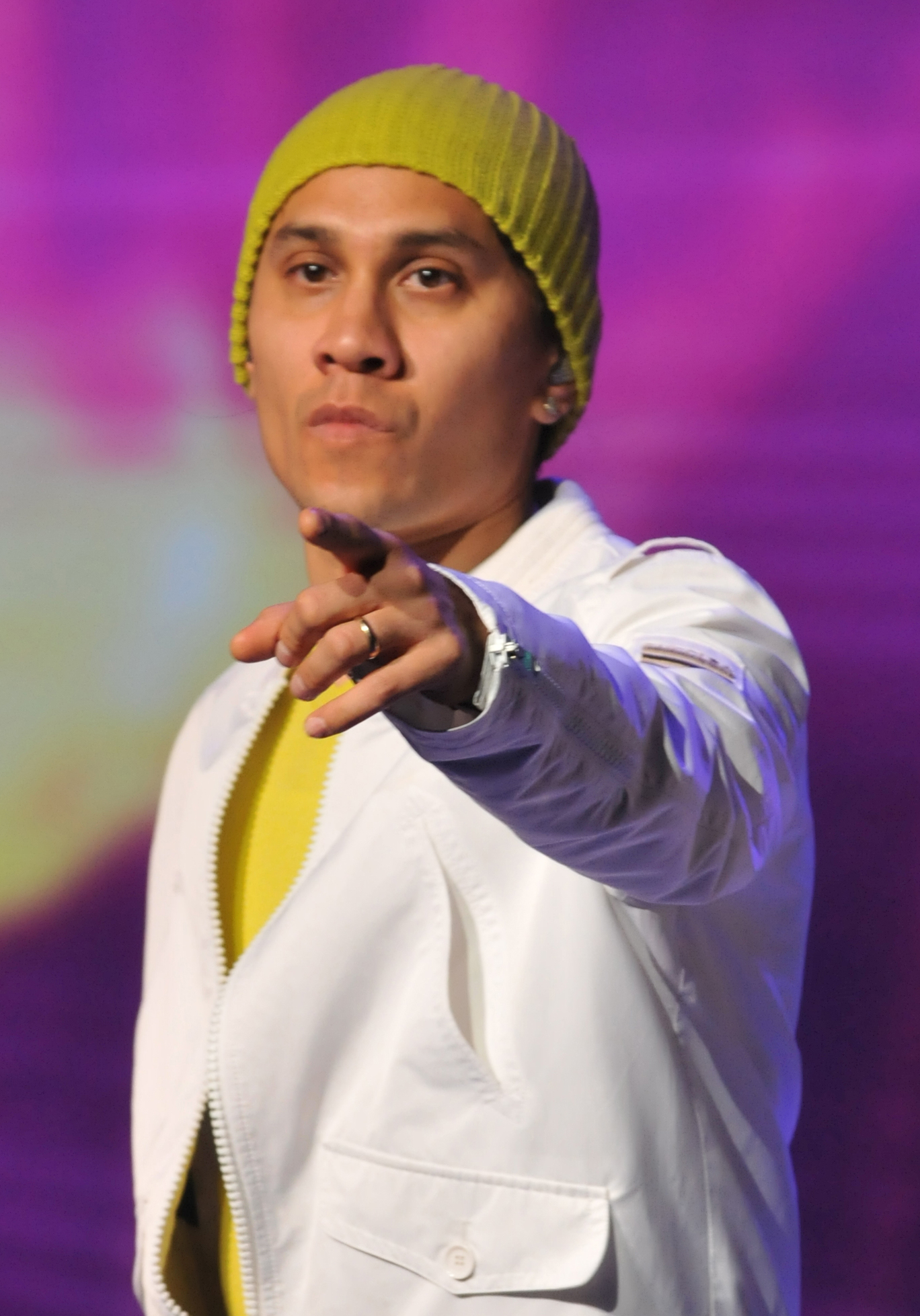
Taboo of The Black Eyed Peas was also featured on "Drop It on Me" alongside Yankee.

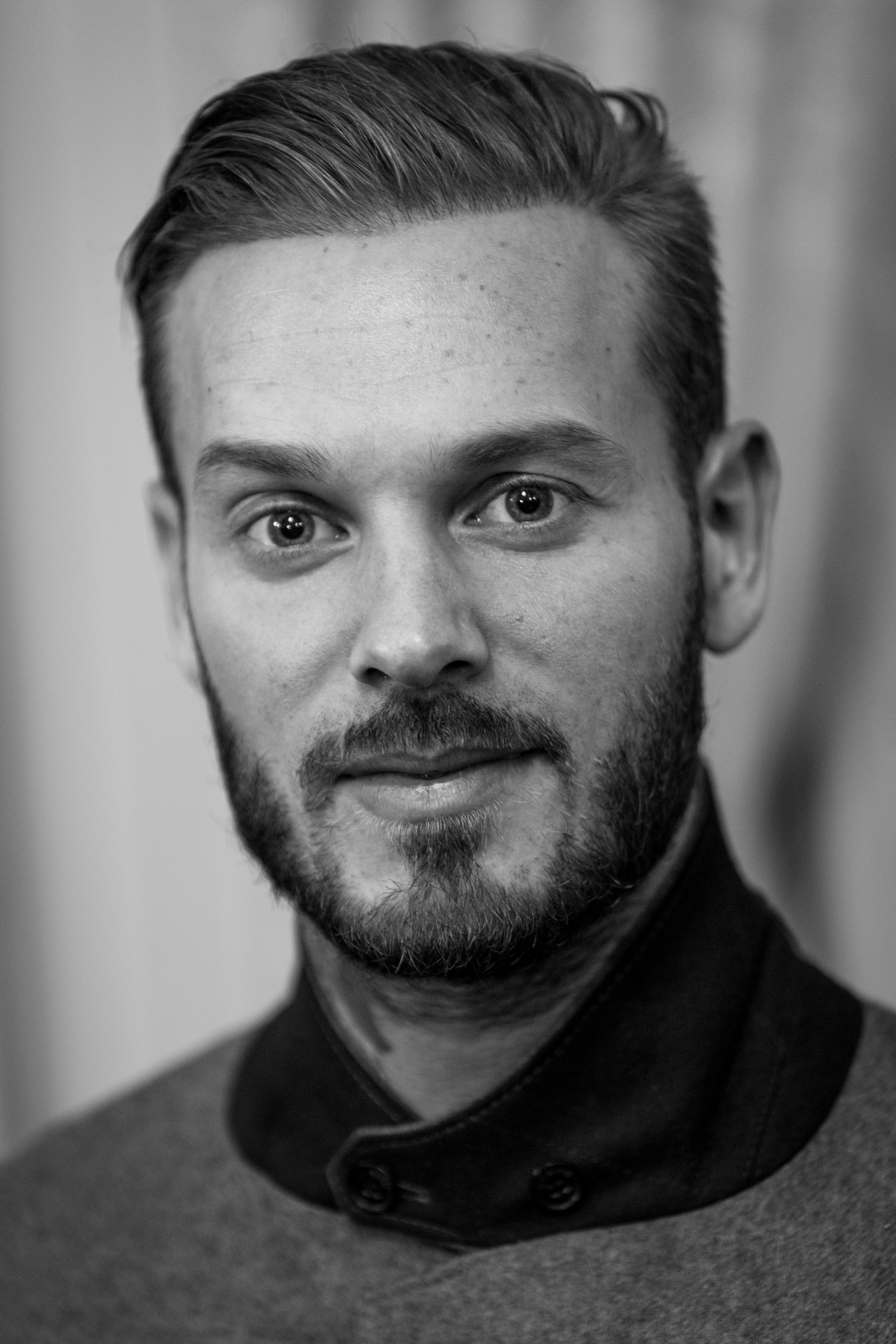
French singer M. Pokora and Martin released a bilingual English-French version of "It's Alright" in 2006.

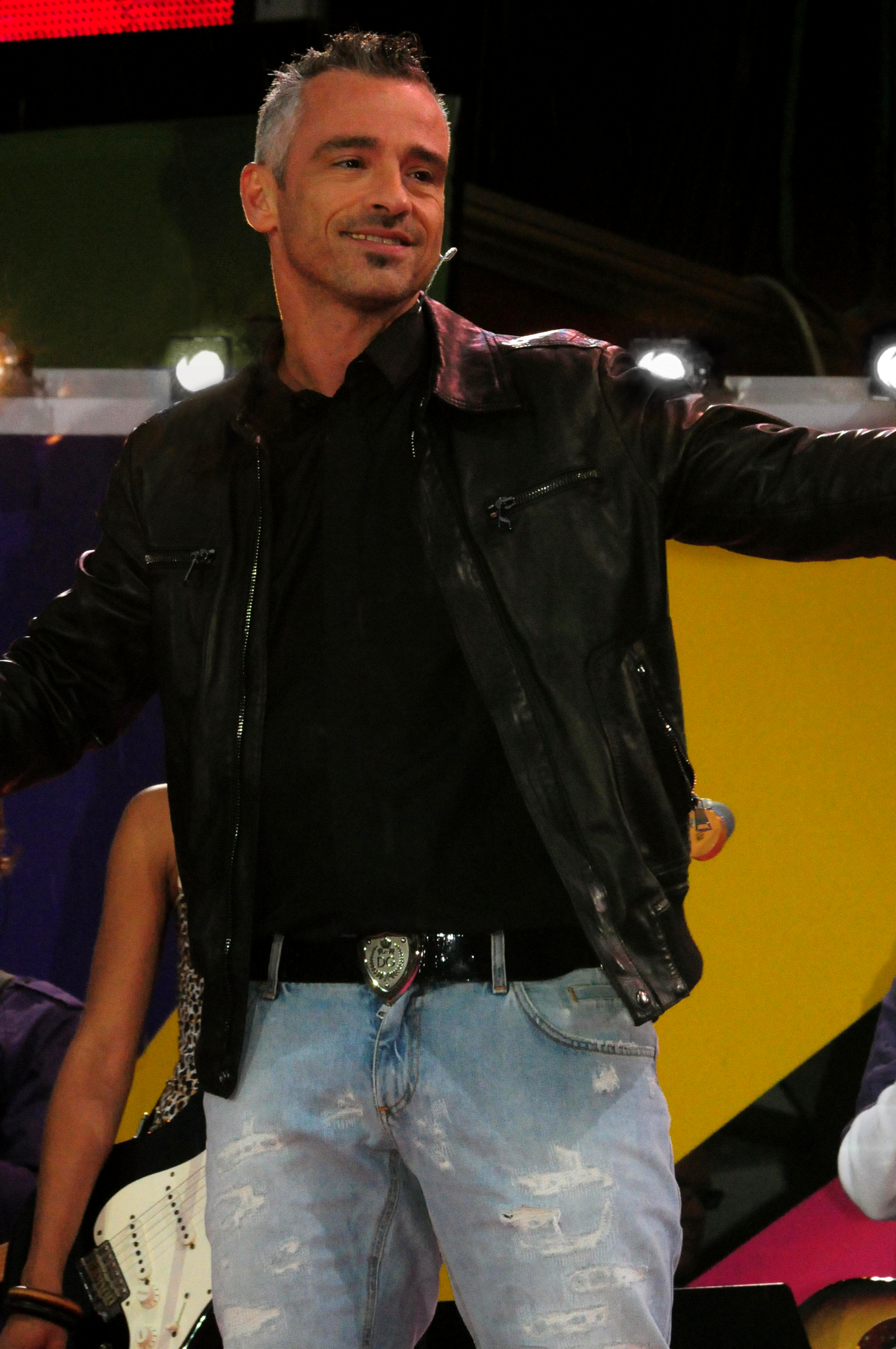
Eros Ramazzotti and Martin recorded the 2007 Italian-language duet, "Non siamo soli".

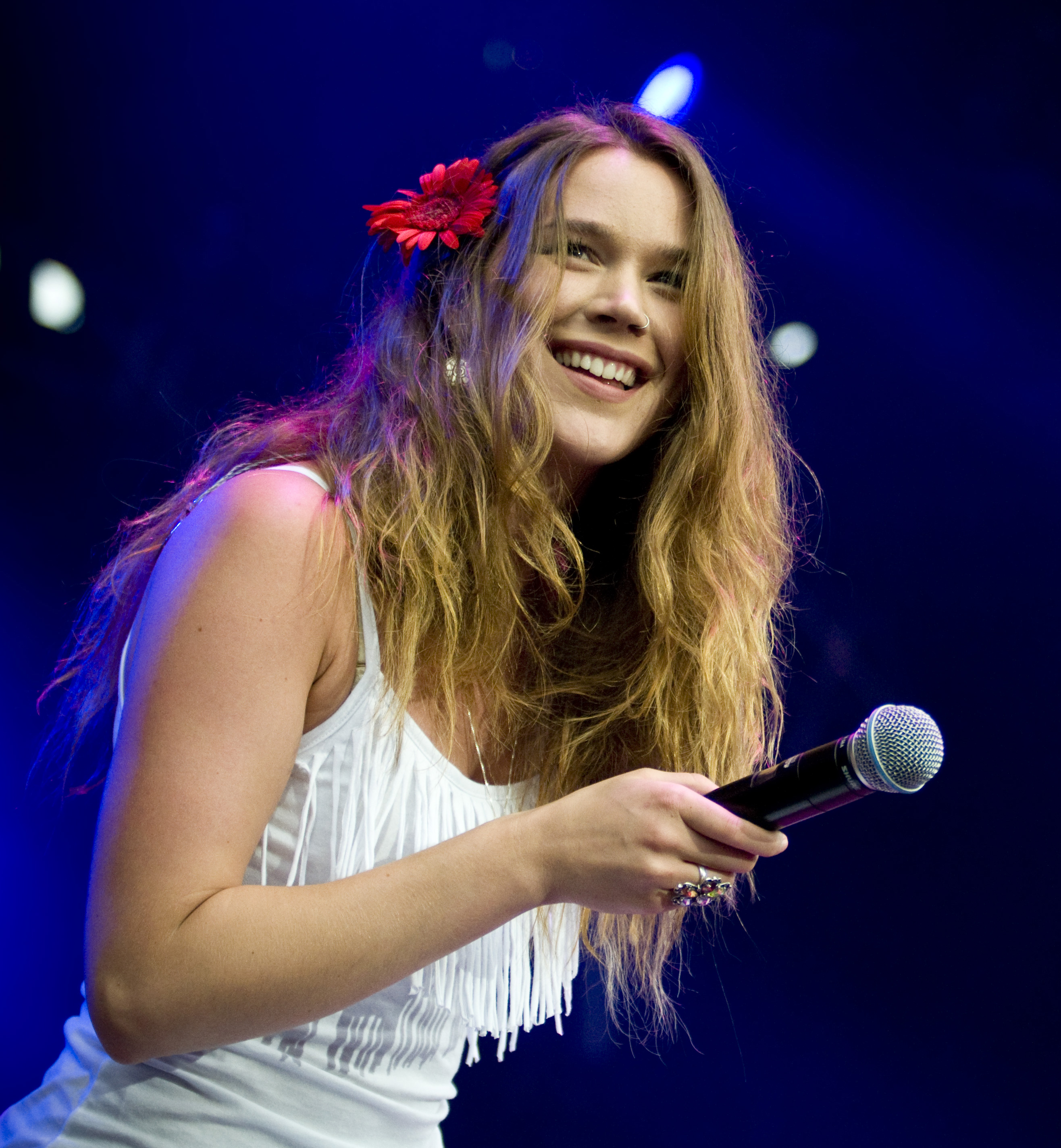
British soul singer Joss Stone was featured on "The Best Thing About Me Is You".

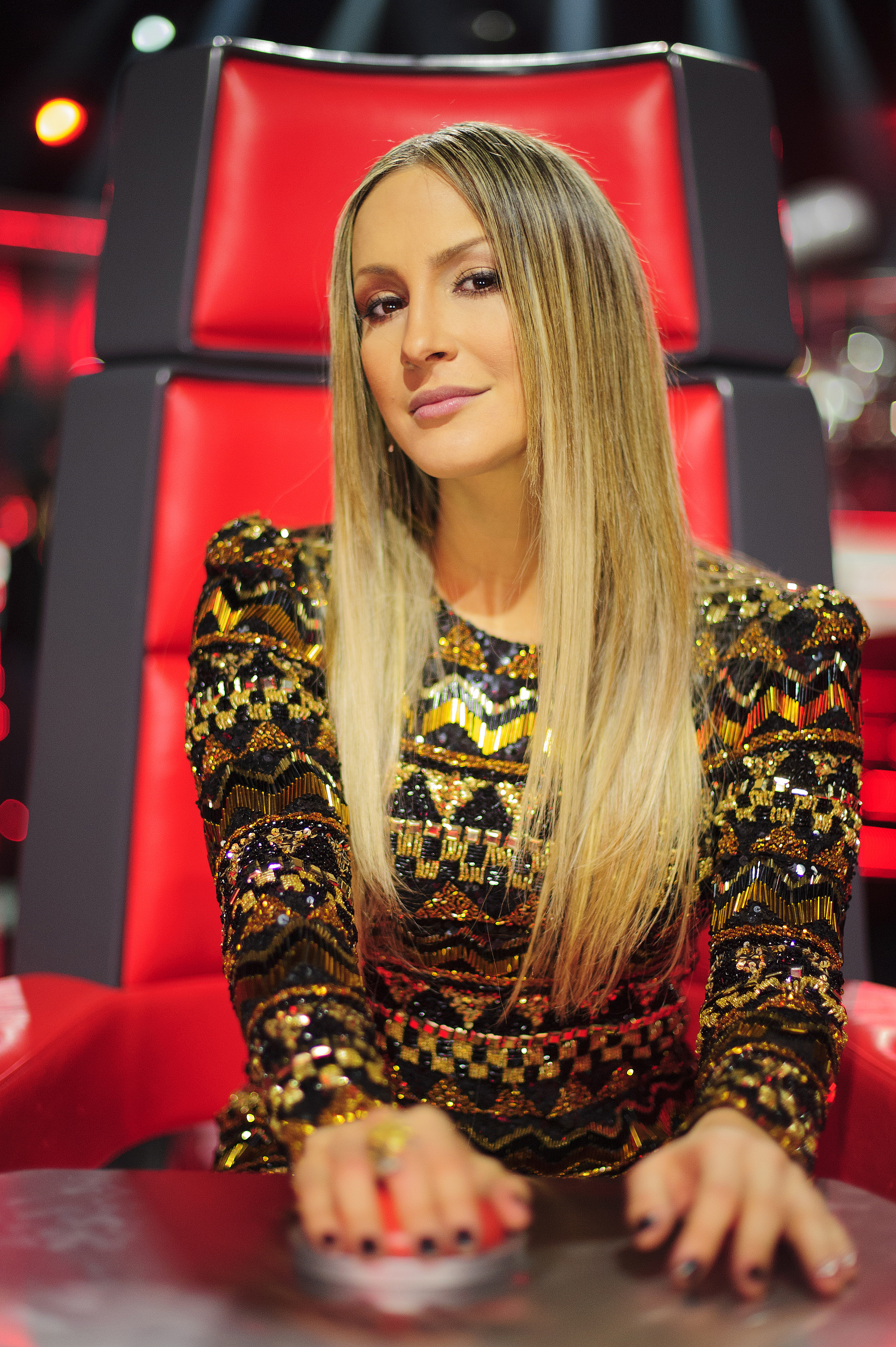
Brazilian singer Claudia Leitte and Martin recorded the 2011 Portuguese-language song "Samba".

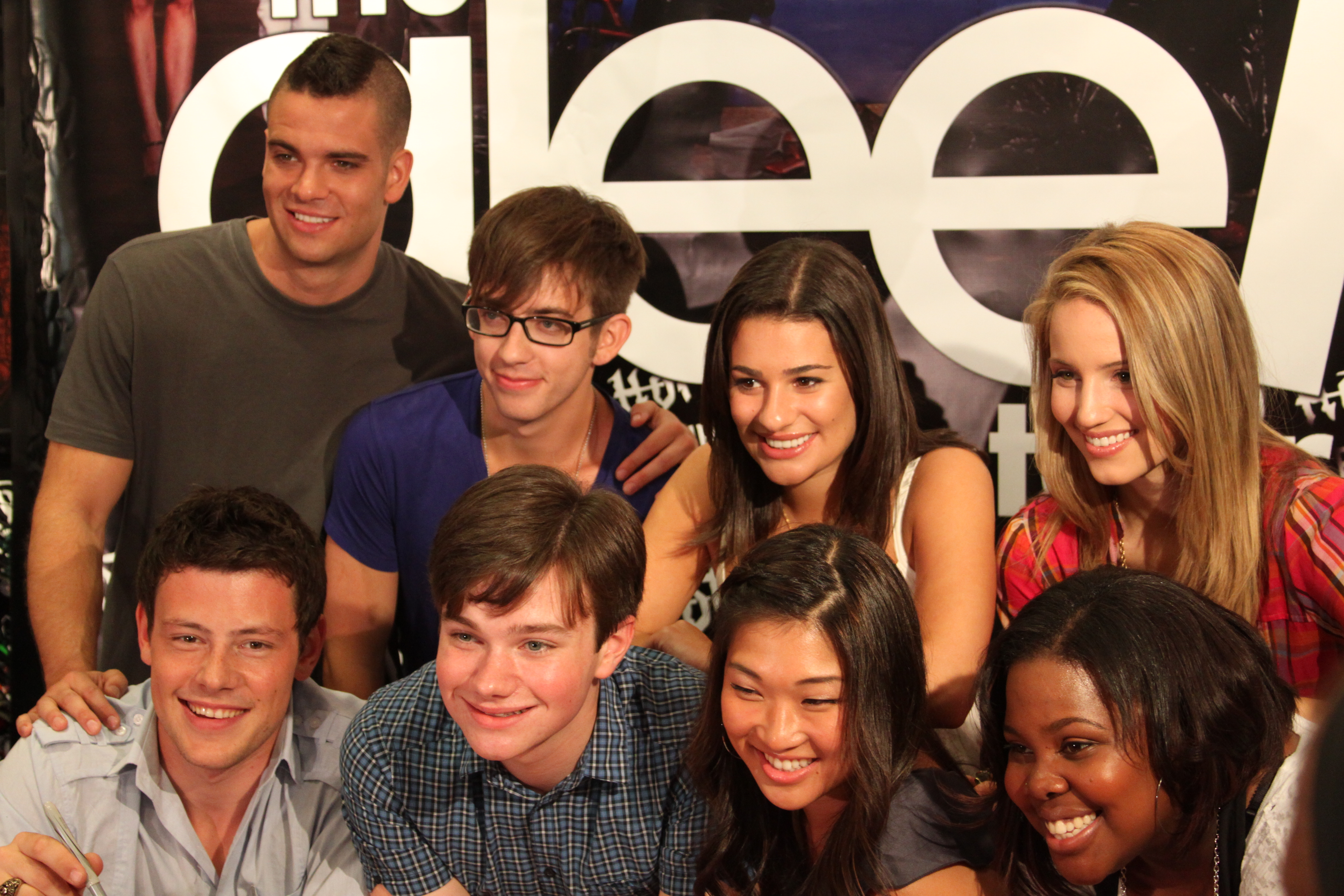
The cast of Glee and Martin recorded covers of "La Isla Bonita" and "Sexy and I Know It".

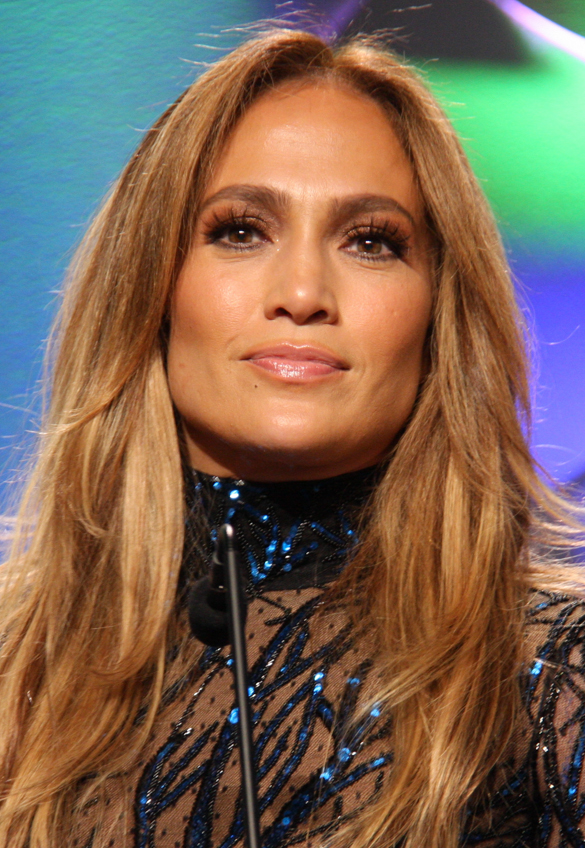
Jennifer Lopez (pictured), Wisin and Martin have sung "Adrenalina" in 2014.

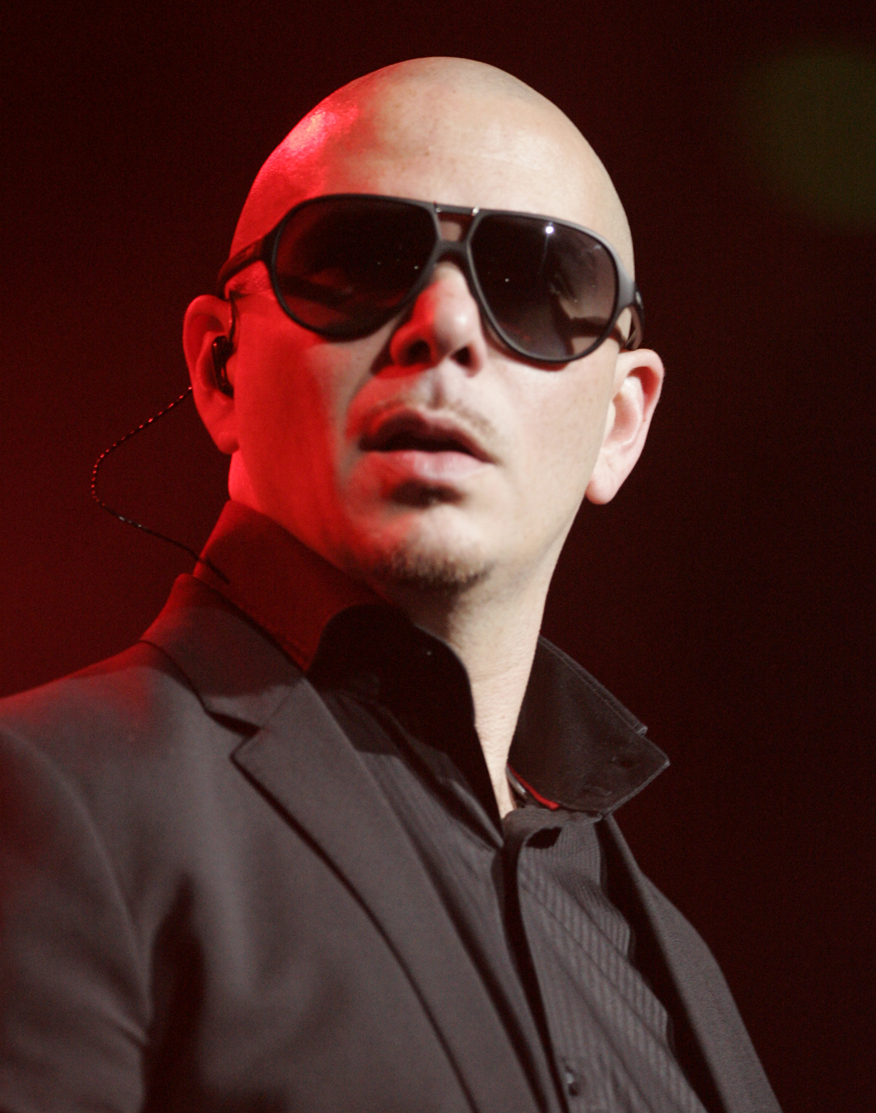
Pitbull is featured on Martin's 2015 single, "Mr. Put It Down".

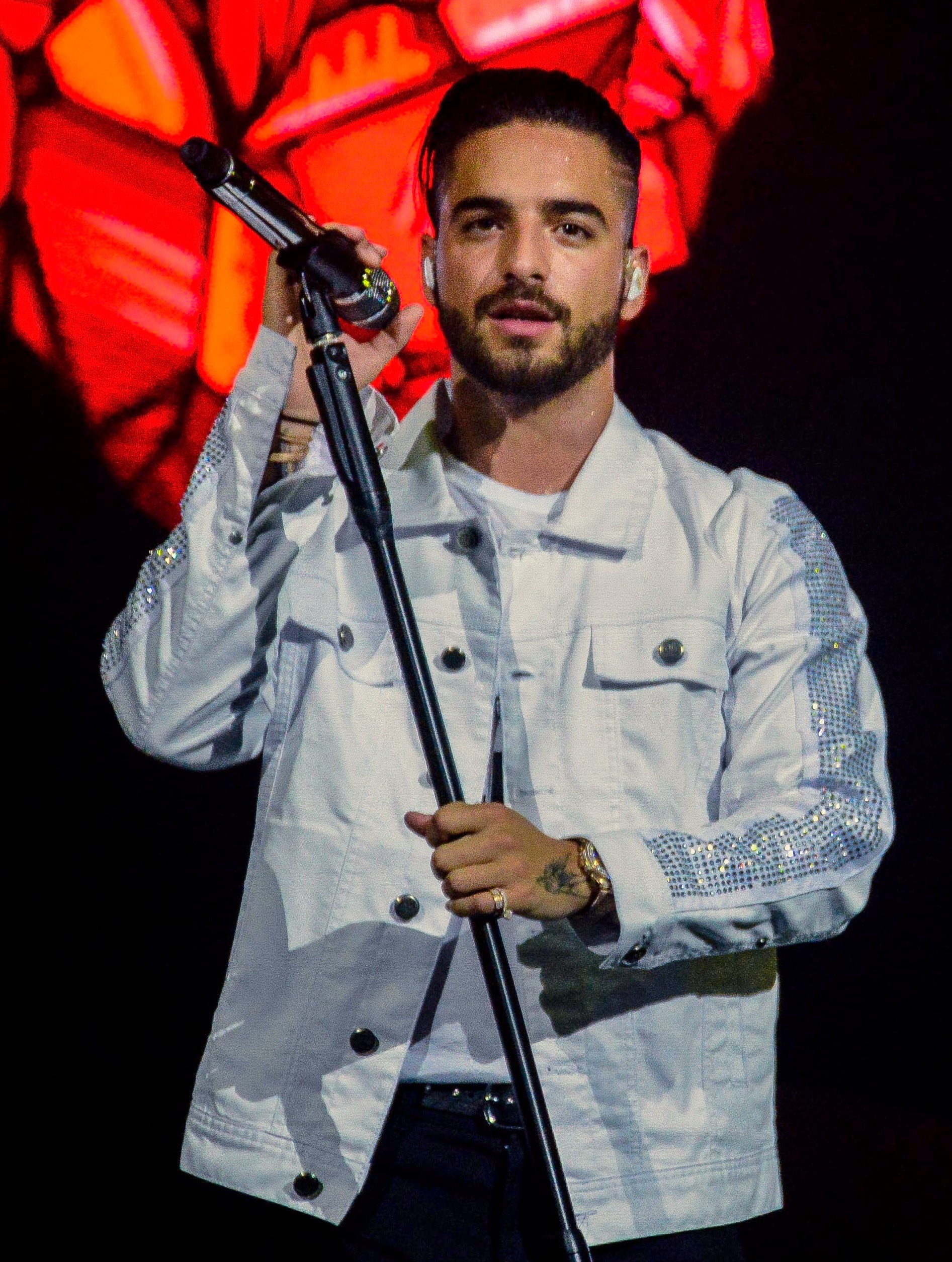
Martin collaborated with Colombian singer Maluma on "Vente Pa' Ca" in 2016 and "No Se Me Quita" in 2019.

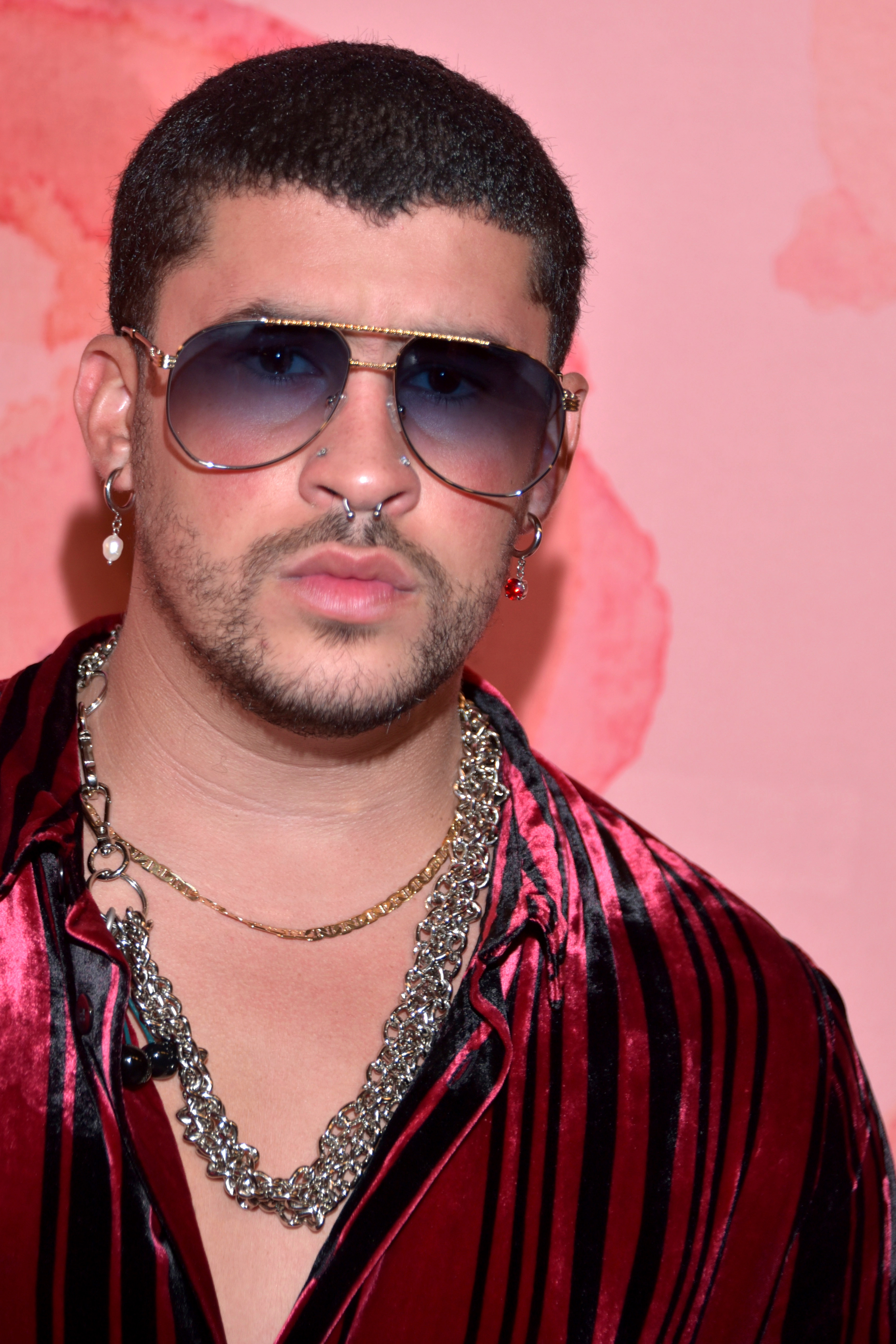
Puerto Rican rapper Bad Bunny (pictured) alongside Residente collaborated with Martin on "Cántalo".

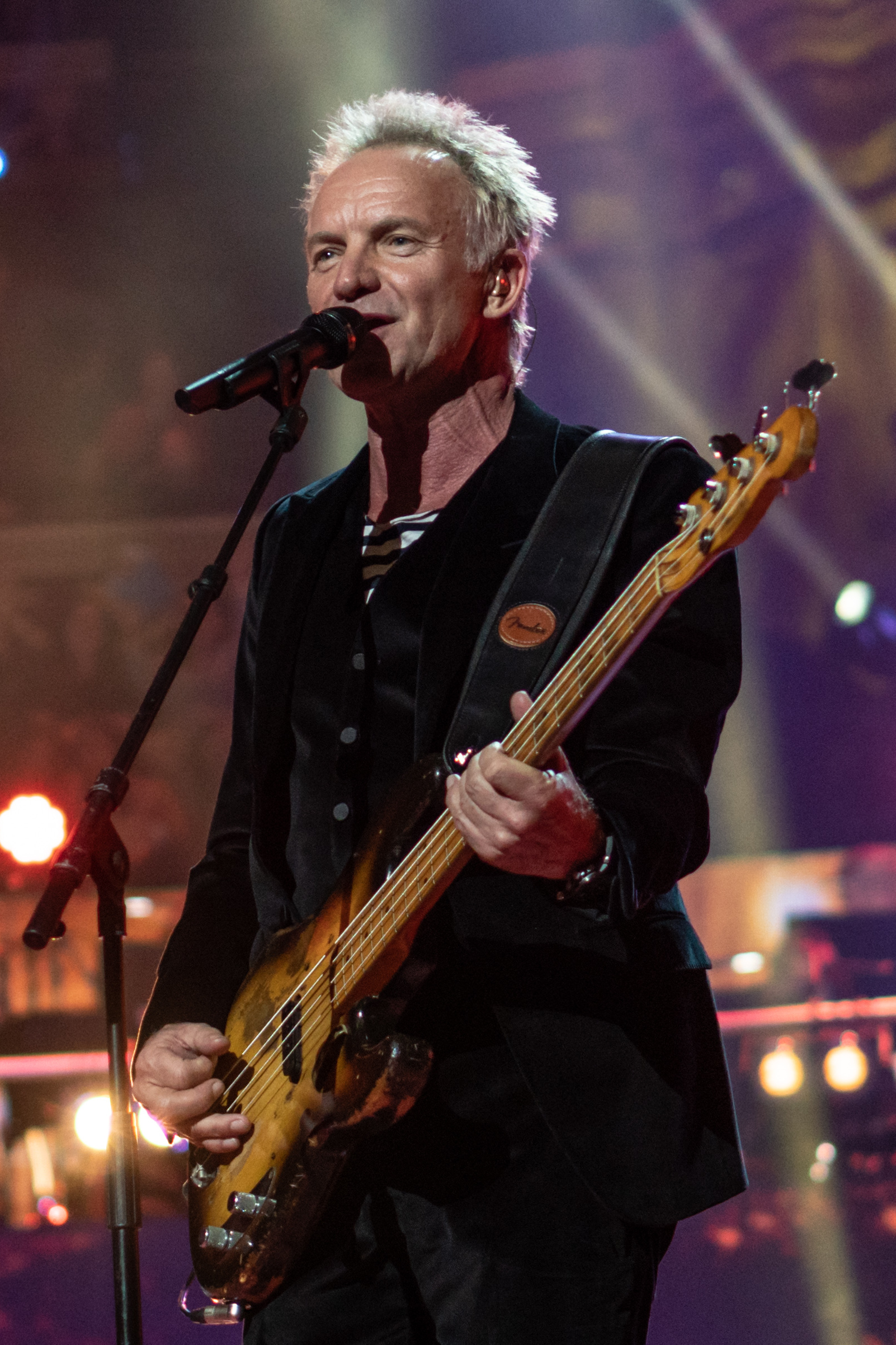
English musician Sting and Martin worked together on "Simple".

Released songs recorded by Ricky Martin
Song	Other performer(s)	Writer(s)	Originating album	Year	Ref.
"Adios (Banda version)" *	Julión Álvarez	Ricky Martin; Yotuel Romero; Antonio Rayo	—N/a	2014	
"Adios (English version)" #	—N/a	Ricky Martin; Yotuel Romero; Antonio Rayo	—N/a	2014	
"Adios (English/French version)" †	—N/a	Ricky Martin; Yotuel Romero; Antonio Rayo	—N/a	2014	
"Adios (English/Turkish version)" †	Ayşe Hatun Önal	Ricky Martin; Yotuel Romero; Antonio Rayo	A Quien Quiera Escuchar (Note: Included exclusively in the version of A Quien Quiera Escuchar released in Turkey.)	2015	
"Adios" *	—N/a	Ricky Martin; Yotuel Romero; Antonio Rayo	A Quien Quiera Escuchar	2014	
"Adrenalina (Spanglish Version)" †	Jennifer Lopez; Wisin	Jennifer Lopez; Ricky Martin; Juan Luis Morera; José Torres; Carlos E. Ortiz	—N/a	2014	
"Adrenalina" *	Wisin; Jennifer Lopez	Jennifer Lopez; Ricky Martin; Juan Luis Morera; José Torres; Carlos E. Ortiz	El Regreso del Sobreviviente	2014	
"Las Almas del Silencio" *	—N/a	Alejandro Sanz	Almas del Silencio	2003	
"Almost a Love Song" #	—N/a	Luis Gómez-Escolar; K.C. Porter; Robi Draco Rosa	—N/a	1999	
"El Amor de Mi Vida" *	—N/a	Eddie Sierra	Ricky Martin	1991	
"Amor" #	—N/a	Robi Draco Rosa; Randall Barlow; Liza Quintana	Sound Loaded	2000	
"Are You in It for Love" #	—N/a	Desmond Child; Paul Barry	Sound Loaded	2000	
"Asi Es la Vida" *	—N/a	Luis Gómez-Escolar; Marco Flores	Vuelve	1998	
"Asignatura Pendiente" *	—N/a	Ricardo Arjona	Almas del Silencio	2003	
"Ay Ay Ay It's Christmas" #	—N/a	Robi Draco Rosa; Desmond Child	—N/a	1999	
"Ayúdame" *	—N/a	Juan Carlos Calderón	Me Amarás	1993	
"Bambú" *	Miguel Bosé	M. Grilli	Papito	2007	
"Basta Ya" *	—N/a	Ricky Martin; Claudia Brant; David Cabrera; Luis Federico Vindver; Desmond Child	Música + Alma + Sexo	2010	
"Be Careful (Cuidado Con Mi Corazón)" #	Madonna	Madonna; William Orbit	Ricky Martin	1999	
"Bella (She's All I Ever Had)" *	—N/a	Robi Draco Rosa; George Noriega; Jon Secada; Luis Gómez-Escolar	Ricky Martin	1999	
"Besos de Fuego" *	—N/a	Yasmil Marrufo; Juan Vicente Zambrano	Almas del Silencio	2003	
"The Best Thing About Me Is You" #	Joss Stone	Ricky Martin; Eric Bazilian; Andreas Carlsson; Desmond Child	Música + Alma + Sexo	2010	
"The Best Thing About Me Is You" #	Edita	Ricky Martin; Eric Bazilian; Andreas Carlsson; Desmond Child	Música + Alma + Sexo (Note: Included exclusively in the German language-speaking countries edition of Música + Alma + Sexo.)	2010	
"La Bomba" *	—N/a	Luis Gómez-Escolar; K.C. Porter; Robi Draco Rosa	Vuelve	1998	
"Bombón de Azúcar" *	—N/a	Carlos Rolón; Mark Kilpatrick; Gustavo Laureano; John Lengel	A Medio Vivir	1995	
"Cae de Una" *	Pedro Capó	Pedro Capó; Gabriel Edgar González Pérez "Rec808"	Pausa	2020	
"Cambia la Piel"	—N/a	Pau Donés	Sound Loaded	2000	
"Canción Bonita" *	Carlos Vives	Andrés Torres; Rafa Arcaute; Ricky Martin; Carlos Vives; Mauricio Rengifo	—N/a	2021	
"Cántalo" *	Residente; Bad Bunny	Ricky Martin; Benito Antonio Martínez Ocasio; René Pérez; Danay Suárez; Rubén Blades; Johnny Pacheco	Pausa	2020	
"Cántame Tu Vida"	—N/a	Ricky Martin; Claudia Brant; David Cabrera; Lester Mendez; Desmond Child	Música + Alma + Sexo	2010	
"Casi un Bolero" *	—N/a	Luis Gómez-Escolar; K.C. Porter; Robi Draco Rosa	Vuelve	1998	
"Come to Me" #	—N/a	Robi Draco Rosa; David Resnik; James Goodwin	Sound Loaded	2000	
"Come with Me (Spanglish version)" †	—N/a	Anthony Egizii; Ilan Kidron; David Musumeci	—N/a	2013	
"Come with Me" #	—N/a	Anthony Egizii; Ilan Kidron; David Musumeci	—N/a	2013	
"Con Tu Nombre (Salsa version)" *	—N/a	Cristian Zalles; Juan Carlos Pérez Soto	—N/a	2007	
"Conmigo Nadie Puede" *	—N/a	Michael Sullivan; Paulo Massadas	Ricky Martin	1991	
"La Copa de la Vida" *	—N/a	Desmond Child; Luis Gómez-Escolar; Robi Draco Rosa	Vuelve	1998	
"Corazonado" *	—N/a	Luis Gómez-Escolar; K.C. Porter; Robi Draco Rosa	Vuelve	1998	
"Corazón Entre Nubes" *	—N/a	Carlos Colla; Marcos Valle	Ricky Martin	1991	
"Corazón" *	—N/a	K.C. Porter; Luis Angel	A Medio Vivir	1995	
"Cuanto Me Acuerdo de Ti" *	—N/a	Ricky Martin; Yotuel Romero; Beatriz Luengo; Antonio Rayo	A Quien Quiera Escuchar	2015	
"The Cup of Life (Spanglish edit)" †	—N/a	Desmond Child; Luis Gómez-Escolar; Robi Draco Rosa	Vuelve	1998	
"The Cup of Life" #	—N/a	Desmond Child; Luis Gómez-Escolar; Robi Draco Rosa	—N/a	1998	
"Cómo Decirte Adiós" *	—N/a	Marco Flores	A Medio Vivir	1995	
"Dame Más (Loaded)" *	—N/a	Robi Draco Rosa; Jon Secada; George Noriega; Robert Blades; Ricardo Gaitán; Alberto Gaitán	Sound Loaded	2000	
"Déjate Llevar" *	—N/a	Danny López; George Pajon Jr.; Javier García; Soraya Lamilla	Life	2005	
"Diana" †	Paul Anka	Paul Anka	Amigos	1996	
"Dime Que Me Quieres" *	—N/a	Frances Lay	Ricky Martin	1991	
"La Diosa del Carnaval (Spanish Eyes)" *	—N/a	Robi Draco Rosa; Desmond Child; Juan Vicente Zambrano	Ricky Martin	1999	
"Disparo al Corazón" *	—N/a	Ricky Martin; Pedro Capó; Yoel Henriquez; Rafael Esparza Ruiz	A Quien Quiera Escuchar	2015	
"Dónde Estarás" *	—N/a	Cristóbal Sansano; Mónica Naranjo	A Medio Vivir	1995	
"Drop It on Me" #	Daddy Yankee; Taboo	Daddy Yankee; will.i.am; George Pajon, Jr.; Melanie Smith; Ricky Martin; Mohandas Dewese; Morgan Robinson; Francisco Saldana; Victor Cabrera; Toby Gad	Life	2005	
"Ella Es" *	—N/a	Juan Carlos Calderón	Me Amarás	1993	
"Entre el Amor y los Halagos" *	—N/a	Juan Carlos Calderón	Me Amarás	1993	
"Eres Como el Aire" *	—N/a	Juan Carlos Calderón	Me Amarás	1993	
"Es Mejor Decirse Adiós" *	—N/a	Juan Carlos Calderón	Me Amarás	1993	
"Falta Amor"	Sebastián Yatra	Andrés Torres; Mauricio Rengifo; Sebastián Obando Giraldo	—N/a	2020	
"Fiebre" *	Wisin & Yandel	Marcos Ramírez Carrasquillo; Andrés Castro; Llandel Veguilla Malavé; José Angel Torres Castro; Eliot José Feliciano; Ricky Martin; Yotuel Romero; Víctor Rafael Torres Betancourt; Beatriz Luengo; Juan Luis Morera Luna	—N/a	2018	
"Freak of Nature" #	—N/a	Claudia Brant; Tainy; Ferras Alqaisi	Playlist: The Very Best of Ricky Martin	2012	
"Frío (Remix)" *	Wisin & Yandel	Ricky Martin; Juan Luis Morera; Llandel Veguilla; Marco Masis; Desmond Child	Música + Alma + Sexo	2010	
"Frío" *	—N/a	Ricky Martin; Juan Luis Morera; Llandel Veguilla; Marco Masis; Desmond Child	Música + Alma + Sexo	2010	
"Fuego Contra Fuego" *	—N/a	Carlos Gómez; Mariano Pérez	Ricky Martin	1991	
"Fuego de Noche, Nieve de Día" *	—N/a	Luis Gómez-Escolar; K. C. Porter; Ian Blake	A Medio Vivir	1995	
"Gracias Por Pensar En Mi" *	—N/a	Ricky Martin; Renato Russo	Vuelve	1998	
"Hagamos el Amor" *	—N/a	Luis Gómez-Escolar; Robi Draco Rosa	Vuelve	1998	
"Hooray! Hooray! It's a Holi-Holiday" *	—N/a	Frank Farian; Fred Jay; Leo Napi	Me Amarás	1993	
"I Am" #	—N/a	Sean Garrett; Ricky Martin; Voltio	Life	2005	
"I Am Made of You" #	—N/a	Robi Draco Rosa; Desmond Child	Ricky Martin	1999	
"I Count the Minutes" #	—N/a	Diane Warren	Ricky Martin	1999	
"I Don't Care" #	Amerie; Fat Joe	Scott Storch; Sean Garrett; Joe Cartagena	Life	2005	
"I Won't Desert You" #	—N/a	George Noriega; Danny López; Randy Cantor; Ricky Martin; Kara DioGuardi	Life	2005	
"I'm on My Way" #	—N/a	Luis Gómez-Escolar; Robi Draco Rosa; Juan Vicente Zambrano	Ricky Martin	1999	
"If You Ever Saw Her" #	—N/a	Mark Taylor; Paul Barry	Sound Loaded	2000	
"Isla Bella" *	—N/a	Yotuel Romero; Beatriz Luengo; Omar Alfanno	A Quien Quiera Escuchar	2015	
"La Isla Bonita" #	Glee cast	Madonna; Patrick Leonard; Bruce Gaitsch	Glee: The Music, The Complete Season Three	2012	
"It's Alright" #	—N/a	Danny López; George Pajon Jr.; Javier García; Soraya Lamilla	Life	2005	
"It's Alright" †	M. Pokora	Danny López; George Pajon Jr.; Javier García; Soraya Lamilla	—N/a	2006	
"Já Nao Há Distancia" §	—N/a	Alan Menken; Marcelo Coutinho; Luciana Seixas	Hercules: Trilha Sonora Original	1997	
"Jaleo (Spanglish version)" †	—N/a	Antonio Rayo; José Miguel Velásquez; Jodi Marr	Almas del Silencio	2003	
"Jaleo" *	—N/a	Antonio Rayo; José Miguel Velásquez; Jodi Marr	Almas del Silencio	2003	
"Jamás" *	—N/a	Emilio Estefan; Tony Mardini; Ricardo Gaitán; Alberto Gaitán; Nicolás Tovar	Almas del Silencio	2003	
"Jezabel" #	—N/a	Desmond Child; Peter Amato	Sound Loaded	2000	
"Juego de Ajedrez" *	—N/a	Manuel Pacho	Ricky Martin	1991	
"Juramento (The Way to Love)" †	—N/a	Jon Secada; George Noriega; Danny Lopez	—N/a	2003	
"Juramento" *	—N/a	Jon Secada; George Noriega; Danny Lopez	Almas del Silencio	2003	
"Liar" #	—N/a	Ricky Martin; Ferras Alqaisi; Marco Masis; Desmond Child	Más Música + Alma + Sexo	2011	
"Life" #	—N/a	George Noriega; Danny López; Ricky Martin	Life	2005	
"Livin' la Vida Loca (Spanish version)" *	—N/a	Robi Draco Rosa; Desmond Child; Luis Gómez-Escolar	Ricky Martin	1999	
"Livin' la Vida Loca" #	—N/a	Robi Draco Rosa; Desmond Child	Ricky Martin	1999	
"Lo Que Nos Pase, Pasará" *	—N/a	Juan Carlos Calderón	Me Amarás	1993	
"Loaded" #	—N/a	Robi Draco Rosa; Jon Secada; George Noriega	Sound Loaded	2000	
"Lola, Lola" *	—N/a	Luis Gómez-Escolar; K.C. Porter; Robi Draco Rosa	Vuelve	1998	
"Love Me for a Day" #	—N/a	Robi Draco Rosa; Randall Barlow; Desmond Child	Ricky Martin	1999	
"Marcia Baila" *	—N/a	Luis Gómez-Escolar; Catherine Ringer; Fred Chichin	Vuelve	1998	
"María (Spanglish edit)" †	—N/a	Luis Gómez-Escolar; K. C. Porter; Ian Blake	A Medio Vivir	1995	
"María" *	—N/a	Luis Gómez-Escolar; K. C. Porter; Ian Blake	A Medio Vivir	1995	
"Más" *	—N/a	Ricky Martin; Claudia Brant; Marco Masis; Ferras Alqaisi; Desmond Child	Música + Alma + Sexo	2010	
"Más y Más" *	Draco Rosa	Robi Draco Rosa; Itaal Shur; Luis Gómez-Escolar	Vida	2013	
"Matame Otra Vez" *	—N/a	Ricky Martin; Yotuel Romero; Beatriz Luengo; David Julca; Johnny Julca	A Quien Quiera Escuchar	2015	
"Me Amarás" *	—N/a	Juan Carlos Calderón	Me Amarás	1993	
"A Medio Vivir" *	—N/a	Franco De Vita	A Medio Vivir	1995	
"Lo Mejor de Mi Vida Eres Tú (Banda version)" *	Jenni Rivera	Andreas Carlsson; Claudia Brant; Desmond Child; Ricky Martin; Eric Bazilian	—N/a	2011	
"Lo Mejor de Mi Vida Eres Tú" *	Natalia Jiménez	Ricky Martin; Claudia Brant; Andreas Carlsson; Eric Bazilian; Desmond Child	Música + Alma + Sexo	2010	
"La Mordidita" *	Yotuel	Ricky Martin; Pedro Capó; José Gómez; Yotuel Romero; Beatriz Luengo	A Quien Quiera Escuchar	2015	
"Mr. Put It Down" #	Pitbull	Ricky Martin; Aaron Pearce; Jeremy Hunter; Keith Ross; Gavriel Avinov; Armando Pérez	—N/a	2015	
"Nada" *	—N/a	Ricky Martin; Yotuel Romero; Beatriz Luengo; David Julca; Johnny Julca	A Quien Quiera Escuchar	2015	
"Náufrago" *	—N/a	Ricky Martin; Yotuel Romero; Antonio Rayo	A Quien Quiera Escuchar	2015	
"Nada es Imposible" *	—N/a	Alejandro Sanz; Luis Angel	A Medio Vivir	1995	
"Nadie Más Que Tú" *	—N/a	Danny Lopez; Tommy Torres; Ricky Martin; Raul del Sol	Almas del Silencio	2003	
"No Estamos Solos" *	Eros Ramazzotti	Claudio Guidetti; Eros Ramazzotti; Kaballà; Mila Ortiz Martin	—N/a	2007	
"No Importa la Distancia" *	—N/a	Alan Menken; David Zippel; Renato López; Javier Pontón	Hercules: Banda Sonora en Español	1997	
"No Me Pidas Más" *	—N/a	Juan Carlos Calderón	Me Amarás	1993	
"No Se Me Quita" *	Maluma	Juan Luis Londoño; Edgar Barrera; Servando Primera; Andrés Castro; Oscar Hernández; Jesus Herrera	11:11	2019	
"No Te Miento" *	—N/a	Ricky Martin; Jodi Marr; Lauren Christy; Ferras Alqaisi; Desmond Child	Música + Alma + Sexo	2010	
"Nobody Wants to Be Lonely (Duet)" #	Christina Aguilera	Robi Draco Rosa; Victoria Shaw; Gary Burr	—N/a	2001	
"Nobody Wants to Be Lonely" #	—N/a	Robi Draco Rosa; Victoria Shaw; Gary Burr	Sound Loaded	2000	
"Non Siamo Soli" ‡	Eros Ramazzotti	Claudio Guidetti; Eros Ramazzotti; Kaballà; Mila Ortiz Martin	e²	2007	
"One Night Man" #	—N/a	Jon Secada; Steve Morales; David Siegel; Manny López; Kara DioGuardi	Sound Loaded	2000	
"Otra Noche en L.A." *	—N/a	Luis Angel O'Neill Laureano "Oneil"; Luís Miguel Gómez "Casta"; Ricky Martin; Juan Vargas; Kevyn Cruz "Keityn"; Lenin Yorney Palacios "Lexuz"	Play	2022	
"Perdido Sin Ti" *	—N/a	Luis Gómez-Escolar; K.C. Porter; Robi Draco Rosa	Vuelve	1998	
"Perdóname" *	—N/a	Ricky Martin; Yotuel Romero; Beatriz Luengo; Antonio Rayo	A Quien Quiera Escuchar	2015	
"Popotitos" *	—N/a	Larry Williams	Ricky Martin	1991	
"Por Arriba, Por Abajo" *	—N/a	Luis Gómez-Escolar; Robi Draco Rosa; César Lemos; Karla Aponte	Vuelve	1998	
"Private Emotion" #	Meja	Eric Bazilian; Rob Hyman	Ricky Martin	1999	
"Puedes Llegar" *	Various artists	Gloria Estefan; Diane Warren	Voces Unidas	1996	
"Recuerdo"	Carla Morrison	Carla Patricia Morrison Flores; Alejandro Jimenez; Demian Jimenez; Chiara Stroia	Pausa	2020	
"A Quien Quiera Escuchar" *	—N/a	Jorge Ruiz Flores	A Quien Quiera Escuchar	2015	
"Quiereme"	Diego el Cigala	Ricky Martin; Alberto Lozada Algarín; Beatriz Luengo; Yotuel Romero	Pausa	2020	
"Que Dia Es Hoy" *	—N/a	Giancarlo Bigazzi; Steve Piccolo; Raffaele Riefoli; Juan Carlos Calderón; Mikel Herzog	Me Amarás	1993	
"Qué Más Da" *	Debi Nova; Fat Joe	Scott Storch; Sean Garrett; Joe Cartagena	Life	2005	
"Qué Rico Fuera" *	Paloma Mami	Enrique Martin Morales; Paloma Rocío Castillo Astorga; Kevyn Mauricio Cruz; Juan Camilo Vargas; Wissem Larfaoui	Play	2021	
"Que Se Sienta el Deseo" *	Wisin	Wisin	Los Vaqueros: La Trilogía	2015	
"Raza de Mil Colores" *	—N/a	Danny Lopez; Yasmil Marrufo; Juan Vicente Zambrano	Almas del Silencio	2003	
"Revolución" *	—N/a	Luis Gómez-Escolar; K. C. Porter; Ian Blake	A Medio Vivir	1995	
"Saint Tropez" #	—N/a	Desmond Child; Robi Draco Rosa	Sound Loaded	2000	
"Samba" §	Claudia Leitte	Ricky Martin; Fernando Santos Leite; Marcello Miranda Leite; Samille Joker; Desmond Child	Más Música + Alma + Sexo	2011	
"Save the Dance" #	—N/a	George Noriega; Danny López; Billy Mann; Ricky Martin	Life	2005	
"Ser Feliz" *	—N/a	Michael Sullivan; Paulo Massadas	Ricky Martin	1991	
"Será Será" *	—N/a	Ricky Martin; Claudia Brant; Ferras Alqaisi; Marco Masís; Desmond Child	Música + Alma + Sexo	2010	
"Sexy and I Know It" #	Glee cast	Stefan Kendal Gordy; Jamahl Listenbee; Erin Beck; George M. Robertson; Kenneth Oliver	Glee: The Music, The Complete Season Three	2012	
"Shake Your Bon-Bon" #	—N/a	Robi Draco Rosa; George Noriega; Desmond Child	Ricky Martin	1999	
"She Bangs (Spanish version)" *	—N/a	Desmond Child; Walter Afanasieff; Robi Draco Rosa; Julia Sierra; Daniel López	Sound Loaded	2000	
"She Bangs" #	—N/a	Desmond Child; Walter Afanasieff; Robi Draco Rosa	Sound Loaded	2000	
"She's All I Ever Had" #	—N/a	Robi Draco Rosa; George Noriega; Jon Secada	Ricky Martin	1999	
"Shine" #	—N/a	Ricky Martin; Daniel Keyes; Desmond Child	Música + Alma + Sexo	2010	
"Si Tú Te Vas" *	—N/a	Juanes	Almas del Silencio	2003	
"Si Ya No Estás Aquí" *	—N/a	Emilio Estefan; Tony Mardini; Ricardo Gaitán; Alberto Gaitán; Nicolás Tovar	Almas del Silencio	2003	
"Simple"	Sting	Ricky Martin; Danay Suárez; Alberto Lozada Algarín; Ender Zambrano; Gordon Sumner	Pausa	2020	
"Solo Quiero Amarte" *	—N/a	Robi Draco Rosa; Victoria Shaw; Gary Burr	La Historia	2001	
"Solo Quiero Amarte" (Salsa version) *	—N/a	Robi Draco Rosa; Victoria Shaw; Gary Burr	—N/a	2001	
"Somos El Mundo 25 Por Haiti" *	Artists for Haiti	Michael Jackson; Daddy Yankee; Lionel Richie; Emilio Estefan; Gloria Estefan	—N/a	2010	
"Somos la Semilla" *	—N/a	Luis Gómez-Escolar; Ian Blake; Manolo Tena	A Medio Vivir	1995	
"Soñador" *	—N/a	Ricky Martin; Claudia Brant; Andreas Carlsson; Desmond Child	Más Música + Alma + Sexo	2011	
"Spanish Eyes" #	—N/a	Robi Draco Rosa; Desmond Child	Ricky Martin	1999	
"Stop Time Tonight" #	—N/a	Diane Warren	Life	2005	
"Susana" *	—N/a	Caroline Bogman; Ferdy Lancee; Mark Foggo	Ricky Martin	1991	
"Tal Vez" *	—N/a	Franco De Vita	Almas del Silencio	2003	
"Tal Vez" (Salsa version) *	—N/a	Franco De Vita	—N/a	2003	
"Te Busco y Te Alcanzo" *	—N/a	Ricky Martin; Fernando Osorio; Lauren Christy; Ferras Alqaisi; Desmond Child	Música + Alma + Sexo	2010	
"Te Extraño, Te Olvido, Te Amo" *	—N/a	Carlos Lara	A Medio Vivir	1995	
"Te Vas" *	—N/a	Ricky Martin; Claudia Brant; Daniel Keyes; Desmond Child	Música + Alma + Sexo	2010	
"Te Voy a Conquistar" *	—N/a	Michael Sullivan; Paulo Massadas	Ricky Martin	1991	
"This Is Good" #	—N/a	George Noriega; Danny López; Scott Storch; Lauren Christy; Scott Spock; Graham Edwards; Ricky Martin	Life	2005	
"Tiburones"	—N/a	Oscar Hernández a/k/a Oscarcito; Pablo Preciado	Pausa	2020	
"Tiburones (Remix)"	Farruko	Farruko; Oscar Hernández a/k/a Oscarcito; Pablo Preciado; Marcos G. Pérez a/k/a Sharo Towers; Franklin Jovani Martínez	—N/a	2020	
"Till I Get You" #	—N/a	George Noriega; Danny López; Itaal Shur; Ricky Martin	Life	2005	
"Todo Es Vida (Everything is Love)" *	Jessica Cristina	Gregory Abbott; Paulo Massadas; Michael Sullivan	Aprendiendo A Querer	1992	
"Todo Para Ti" *	The All Stars	Michael Jackson; Rubén Blades	—N/a	2001	
"Too Late Now" #	—N/a	Ricky Martin; Ferras Alqaisi; Marco Masis; Desmond Child	Más Música + Alma + Sexo	2011	
"The Touch" #	—N/a	Desmond Child; Diane Warren	Sound Loaded	2000	
"Tu Recuerdo" (Salsa version) *	La Mari	Tommy Torres	—N/a	2007	
"Tú y Yo" *	—N/a	Ricky Martin; Claudia Brant; Desmond Child	Música + Alma + Sexo	2010	
"Ven a Mí (Come to Me)" *	—N/a	Robi Draco Rosa; David Resnik; James Goodwin; Danny López	Sound Loaded	2000	
"Vente Pa' Ca" *	Maluma	Ricky Martin; Juan Londoño; Anne Judith Wik; Ronny Svendsen; Nermin Harambasic; Justin Stein; Carl Ryden; Lars "Chief 1" Pedersen; Ricky Montaner; Mauricio Montaner	—N/a	2016	
"Vente Pa' Ca" (Salsa version) *	Maluma	Ricky Martin; Juan Londoño; Anne Judith Wik; Ronny Svendsen; Nermin Harambasic; Justin Stein; Carl Ryden; Lars "Chief 1" Pedersen; Ricky Montaner; Mauricio Montaner	—N/a	2016	
"Vida (Portuguese version)" §	—N/a	Ricky Martin; Salaam Remi; Elijah King; Afo Verde; Roxana Amed	—N/a	2014	
"Vida (Spanglish version)" †	—N/a	Ricky Martin; Salaam Remi; Elijah King	One Love, One Rhythm	2014	
"Vida (Spanish version)" *	—N/a	Ricky Martin; Salaam Remi; Elijah King; Afo Verde; Roxana Amed	—N/a	2014	
"Volverás" *	—N/a	Luis Gómez-Escolar; K. C. Porter; Ian Blake; Ricky Martin	A Medio Vivir	1995	
"Vuelo" *	—N/a	Fernando Riba; Kiko Campos	Ricky Martin	1991	
"Vuelve" *	—N/a	Franco De Vita	Vuelve	1998	
"What More Can I Give" #	The All Stars	Michael Jackson	—N/a	2001	
"Y Todo Queda en Nada" *	—N/a	Estéfano; Julio Reyes Copello	Almas del Silencio	2003	
"Y Todo Queda en Nada" (Salsa version) *	—N/a	Estéfano; Julio Reyes Copello	—N/a	2004	
"You Stay with Me" #	—N/a	Diane Warren	Ricky Martin	1999	

== See also ==
- Ricky Martin albums discography
- Ricky Martin singles discography
- Menudo discography
