= Greatest Hits (Ricky Martin album) =

(17) Greatest Hits

Greatest hits album by Ricky Martin
- Released: July 11, 2011
- Recorded: 1995–2011
- Genres: Latin pop; dance-pop
- Length: 71:11
- Label: Columbia
- Producers: Walter Afanasieff; Ian Blake; David Cabrera; Desmond Child; Emilio Estefan; Pablo Flores; Javier Garza; Danny López; Wally López; George Noriega; George Pajon Jr.; K. C. Porter; Draco Rosa; Jon Secada; Scott Storch; Tommy Torres; will.i.am

Ricky Martin chronology
Música + Alma + Sexo (2011)	(17) Greatest Hits (2011)	Playlist: The Very Best of Ricky Martin (2012)

Professional ratings
Review scores
Source	Rating
AllMusic	4/5 stars
Daily Express	3/5 stars

17 Greatest Hits is a greatest hits album by the Puerto Rican singer Ricky Martin. It was released exclusively in the United Kingdom on July 11, 2011.

Greatest Hits was released one day before Ricky Martin's concert in London which was a part of his Música + Alma + Sexo World Tour. This compilation includes all of Martin's UK singles: "Livin' la Vida Loca" (number one for three weeks; platinum certification), "She Bangs" (number three; silver certification), "Nobody Wants to Be Lonely" (number four), "María" (number six), "Private Emotion" (number nine), "I Don't Care" (number eleven), "Shake Your Bon-Bon" (number twelve), "Loaded" (number nineteen) and "The Cup of Life" (number twenty-nine).

The album also includes "The Best Thing About Me Is You" which features English singer Joss Stone and "Más" (Wally Bilingual Remix). "The Best Thing About Me Is You" and album version of "Más" were originally included on Música + Alma + Sexo (2011). The album debuted at number twenty-four on the UK Albums Chart selling 5,083 copies.

== Track listing ==
No.	Title	Writer(s)	Producer(s)	Length
1.	"Livin' la Vida Loca"	Luis Gómez-Escolar; Desmond Child; Draco Rosa	Child; Rosa	4:03
2.	"María" (Pablo Flores Spanglish Radio Edit)	Escolar; K. C. Porter; Ian Blake	Blake; Porter; Javier Garza; Pablo Flores	4:29
3.	"She Bangs"	Child; Walter Afanasieff; Rosa; Glenn Monroig; Julia Sierra; Danny López	Rosa; Afanasieff	4:40
4.	"Shake Your Bon-Bon"	Child; Rosa; George Noriega	Noriega; Rosa	3:09
5.	"Nobody Wants to Be Lonely" (with Christina Aguilera)	Child; Victoria Shaw; Gary Burr	Afanasieff	4:09
6.	"The Cup of Life"	Escolar; Child; Rosa	Child; Rosa	4:31
7.	"La Bomba"	Escolar; Porter; Rosa	Porter; Rosa	4:34
8.	"I Don't Care" (featuring Fat Joe and Amerie)	Joe Cartagena; Scott Storch; Sean Garrett	Storch	3:51
9.	"Private Emotion" (with Meja)	Rob Hyman; Eric Bazilian	Child; Rosa	4:00
10.	"She's All I Ever Had"	Jon Secada; Rosa; Noriega	Noriega; Secada; Rosa; Afanasieff	4:55
11.	"Come to Me"	Rosa; David Resnik; James Goodwin	Emilio Estefan; Noriega	4:31
12.	"The Best Thing About Me Is You" (featuring Joss Stone)	Child; Ricky Martin; Bazilian; Andreas Carlsson	Child	3:35
13.	"Spanish Eyes/Lola, Lola" (Medley) (Music from One Night Only video)	Escolar; Child; Porter; Rosa; Blake	Child; Porter; Rosa	5:46
14.	"Loaded" (George Noriega Radio Edit 2)	Secada; Rosa; Noriega	Estefan; Noriega; Rosa	3:48
15.	"It's Alright"	Danny López; George Pajon Jr.; Javier García; Soraya Lamilla	will.i.am; López; Pajon; Martin	3:31
16.	"Pégate" (MTV Unplugged Version) (Radio Edit)	Roy Tavaré; Martin; Tommy Torres	Torres; David Cabrera	3:10
17.	"Más" (Wally Bilingual Remix)	Child; Martin; Claudia Brant; Tainy; Ferras Alqaisi	Child; Wally López	4:29

== Charts ==
Chart (2011)	Peak position
Scottish Albums (Official Charts)	26
UK Albums (Official Charts)	24

== Release history ==
Region	Date	Label	Format	Catalog
United Kingdom	July 11, 2011	Columbia	CD	88697940302
