= Playlist: The Very Best of Ricky Martin =

Greatest hits album by Ricky Martin
- Released: October 9, 2012
- Recorded: 1995–2011
- Genre: Latin pop, dance-pop
- Label: Legacy
- Producer: Walter Afanasieff, Ian Blake, David Cabrera, Desmond Child, Emilio Estefan, Pablo Flores, Javier Garza, Danny López, Wally López, George Noriega, George Pajon Jr., K. C. Porter, Draco Rosa, Jon Secada, Scott Storch, Tommy Torres, will.i.am

Ricky Martin chronology
Greatest Hits (2011)	Playlist: The Very Best of Ricky Martin (2012)	Greatest Hits: Souvenir Edition (2013)

Professional ratings
Review scores
Source	Rating
AllMusic	4/5 stars

Playlist: The Very Best of Ricky Martin is a greatest hits album released by Legacy Recordings, featuring a collection of Ricky Martin's English-language songs. It was released on October 9, 2012, as part of the Playlist compilation albums series.

Playlist: The Very Best of Ricky Martin contains Martin's English-language hits and two album tracks from the 2005 album, Life: "Save the Dance" and "Sleep Tight". It also includes "Shine" from Música + Alma + Sexo (2011) and an English-language version of "Más", titled "Freak of Nature" that was remixed by Ralphi Rosario.

== Track listing ==
Playlist: The Very Best of Ricky Martin track listing
No.	Title	Writer(s)	Producer(s)	Length
1.	"María" (Pablo Flores Spanglish Radio Edit)	Luis Gómez-Escolar, K. C. Porter, Ian Blake	Blake, Porter, Javier Garza, Pablo Flores	4:30
2.	"The Cup of Life (La Copa de la Vida)" (Remix – English Radio Edit)	Desmond Child, Draco Rosa	Child, Rosa	4:36
3.	"Livin' la Vida Loca"	Child, Rosa	Child, Rosa	4:02
4.	"She's All I Ever Had"	Jon Secada, Rosa, George Noriega	Noriega, Secada, Rosa, Walter Afanasieff	4:54
5.	"Shake Your Bon-Bon"	Child, Rosa, Noriega	Noriega, Rosa	3:10
6.	"She Bangs" (English Edit)	Child, Afanasieff, Rosa	Rosa, Afanasieff, Child	4:03
7.	"Nobody Wants to Be Lonely" (with Christina Aguilera)	Child, Victoria Shaw, Gary Burr	Afanasieff	4:10
8.	"Loaded" (Fused - Re-Loaded Mix 03)	Secada, Rosa, Noriega	Emilio Estefan, Noriega, Rosa	3:40
9.	"I Don't Care" (Ralphi & Craig's Club Radio Edit featuring Amerie)	Joe Cartagena, Scott Storch, Sean Garrett	Storch, Ralphi Rosario	3:35
10.	"It's Alright" (Radio Edit)	López, George Pajon Jr., Javier García, Soraya Lamilla	will.i.am, López, Pajon, Ricky Martin	3:21
11.	"Sleep Tight"	Martin/Noriega/D. López/Lauren Christy/The Matrix		3:50
12.	"Save the Dance"	Noriega, López, Billy Mann, Martin	Noriega, López, Martin	4:03
13.	"The Best Thing About Me Is You" (featuring Joss Stone)	Child, Martin, Eric Bazilian, Andreas Carlsson	Child	3:36
14.	"Shine"	Child, Martin, Dan Keyes	Child	4:45
15.	"Freak of Nature" (Ralphi Rosario's Big Room Club Vocal Mix)	Child, Martin, Claudia Brant, Tainy, Ferras Alqaisi	Child, Rosario	8:09

== Release history ==
Release history and formats for Playlist: The Very Best of Ricky Martin
Region	Date	Label	Format	Catalog
Taiwan	November 20, 2012	Sony Music	CD	88725474502
