= Frío (song) =

Single by Ricky Martin featuring Wisin & Yandel

from the album Música + Alma + Sexo
- Released: July 11, 2011
- Recorded: 2010
- Genre: Latin pop; samba; reggae fusion; EDM
- Length: 3:22
- Label: Columbia
- Songwriters: Desmond Child; Ricky Martin; Wisin & Yandel; Tainy
- Producers: Desmond Child; Wisin & Yandel; Tainy

Ricky Martin singles chronology
"Más" (2011)	"Frío" (2011)	"Samba" (2011)

Wisin & Yandel singles chronology
"No Dejemos Que se Apague" (2010)	"Frío" (2011)	"Tu Olor" (2011)

Music video
- "Frío" on YouTube

"Frío" (English: "Cold") is the third single from Ricky Martin's studio album, Música + Alma + Sexo (2011). It was released as a digital download on July 11, 2011.

== Background ==
In a Billboard interview, Martin described the track: "I fell in love with the melody of this song, which was brought to me by Wisin & Yandel. We sat down -- Wisin & Yandel, Desmond Child and me -- and we worked on the lyrics to make them more me. So we have several versions and we're working on a remix. The lyrics say, "You're beautiful, like the waves in the sea." And many people say, 'But Ricky, you've said you're gay.' And I say, 'Well, doesn't mean I'm blind. And I've also been in love with women before.'"

== Critical reception ==
"Frío" received positive reviews from critics. The Los Angeles Times said: "steeped in the majestic atmospherics of reggaetón but reflected through a prism of creamy pop, the lush "Frío"—composed by famed boricua duo Wisin & Yandel—is probably the strongest cut here." The New York Post called it a beautiful standout tune. Latina wrote that "the reggaeton-tinged "Frío" slows things down with lyrics about a beautiful woman imagined by Martin and collaborators Wisin & Yandel. The remix of the song makes for a sexy dance floor number."

== Commercial performance ==
"Frío" reached number six on Billboard's Hot Latin Songs chart, number seven on Latin Pop Airplay and number five on Tropical Songs.

== Music video ==
Martin shot the music video with Wisin & Yandel in the Paz Palace in Buenos Aires on June 6, 2011. The female lead is portrayed by Argentinian top model, Paula Chaves. The video, directed by Carlos Pérez, premiered on July 21, 2011. Pérez worked with Martin on few of his previous videos, including: "Tal Vez," "Jaleo" and "The Best Thing About Me Is You."

== Remixes ==
Música + Alma + Sexo contains the original solo version of the song and a remix featuring Wisin & Yandel. The latter was released as a single on July 18, 2011 as Remix Radio Edit. One week earlier, on July 11, 2011, the new version of "Frío" remixed by Wally López was also released as a digital download. Remix created by López was included later on the Fan Edition of Música + Alma + Sexo.

== Live performances ==
Ricky Martin performed "Frío" during his Música + Alma + Sexo World Tour. He also performed a medley of "Frío/Más" during the Premios Juventud on July 21, 2011.

== Awards ==
"Frío" was nominated for the International Dance Music Award in category Best Latin/Reggaeton Track. The music video was nominated for the Premios People en Español for Mejor Video del Año.

== Formats and track listings ==
- Digital single
1. "Frío" (DJ Wally Remix) – 3:15
- Digital single
1. "Frío" (Remix Radio Edit) – 3:36

== Charts ==
=== Weekly charts ===
Chart (2011)	Peak position
US Hot Latin Songs (Billboard)	6
US Latin Pop Airplay (Billboard)	7
US Tropical Airplay (Billboard)	5

=== Year-end charts ===
Chart (2011)	Position
US Latin Pop Songs (Billboard)	45
