= Samba (song) =

Single by Ricky Martin featuring Claudia Leitte

from the album Más Música + Alma + Sexo
- Released: September 18, 2011
- Recorded: 2010
- Genre: Dance-pop
- Length: 3:09
- Label: Columbia
- Songwriters: Samille Joker, Enrique Morales, John Barrett, Fernando Leite, Marcello Leite

Ricky Martin singles chronology
"Frío" (2011)	"Samba" (2011)	"Sexy and I Know It" (2012)

Music video
- "Samba" on YouTube

"Samba" is a song recorded by Ricky Martin for the Brazilian edition of his album, Música + Alma + Sexo (2011) and a new mix of the song was later included in the international re-release of the album entitled Más Música + Alma + Sexo. It features vocals by Brazilian singer, Claudia Leitte. "Samba" was released as a promotional single exclusively in Brazil. Ricky Martin sings in English-language and Claudia Leitte in Portuguese.

== Music video ==
The music video was shot in Miami on July 28–29, 2011 and premiered on September 18, 2011. It was directed by Flávia Moraes and features both singers dancing and singing together in different costumes.

== Remixes and other versions ==
The song mixes an upbeat ballad with samba. The Brazilian edition of Música + Alma + Sexo contains the album version of the song and a club remix by the DJ and producer Fernando Deeplick. The mixing of the video version is different than the ones previously known, and is featured in the re-release of the album entitled Más Música + Alma + Sexo.

== Formats and track listings ==
Promotional single

1. "Samba" (featuring Claudia Leitte) - 3:09
2. "Samba" (featuring Claudia Leitte - Deeplick Carnival Mix) – 4:38
3. "Samba" (featuring Claudia Leitte - Dub2Deep Remix) – 4:57
