= Greatest Hits: Souvenir Edition =

Greatest hits album by Ricky Martin
- Released: April 12, 2013
- Recorded: 1995–2011
- Length: 76:18
- Label: Sony Music Australia
- Producer: Walter Afanasieff; David Cabrera; Desmond Child; Emilio Estefan; Pablo Flores; Javier Garza; Danny López; Wally López; George Noriega; George Pajon Jr.; K. C. Porter; Robi Rosa; Jon Secada; Tommy Torres; will.i.am

Ricky Martin chronology
Playlist: The Very Best of Ricky Martin (2012)	Greatest Hits: Souvenir Edition (2013)	A Quien Quiera Escuchar (2015)

Greatest Hits: Souvenir Edition is a greatest hits album by Puerto Rican singer-songwriter Ricky Martin. It was released exclusively in Australia, New Zealand and Taiwan on April 12, 2013. The album was issued as a CD/DVD combo and features all of Martin's biggest hits, including: "María", "The Cup of Life", "Livin' la Vida Loca", "She Bangs" and "Nobody Wants to Be Lonely". Martin promoted the album during his 2013 Australian Tour. The music video to Maria featured on the DVD is a completely different alternate video only shown in a few countries like Australia

== Track listing ==
Greatest Hits: Souvenir Edition — CD
No.	Title	Writer(s)	Producer(s)	Length
1.	"Livin' la Vida Loca"	Desmond Child; Robi Rosa	Desmond Child; Rosa	4:03
2.	"María" (Pablo Flores Spanglish Radio Edit)	Rosa; K. C. Porter; Luis Gómez-Escolar	Porter; Rosa; Pablo Flores; Javier Garza	4:31
3.	"She Bangs" (English Edit)	Rosa; Walter Afanasieff; Desmond Child	Rosa; Walter Afanasieff; Desmond Child	4:05
4.	"Shake Your Bon-Bon"	George Noriega; Rosa; Desmond Child	Noriega; Rosa	3:11
5.	"Nobody Wants to Be Lonely" (with Christina Aguilera)	Desmond Child; Gary Burr; Victoria Shaw	Afanasieff	4:11
6.	"The Cup of Life (La Copa de la Vida)" (Crowd Noise)	Rosa; Desmond Child	Rosa; Desmond Child	4:33
7.	"La Bomba"	Rosa; Porter; Escolar	Porter; Rosa	4:36
8.	"Private Emotion" (featuring Meja)	Eric Bazilian; Rob Hyman	Desmond Child; Rosa	4:02
9.	"She's All I Ever Had"	Jon Secada; Rosa; Noriega	Secada; Noriega; Rosa	4:55
10.	"Come to Me"	Rosa; David Resnik; James Goodwin	Noriega; Emilio Estefan	4:32
11.	"The Best Thing About Me Is You" (featuring Joss Stone)	Enrique Martin-Morales; Bazilian; Andreas Carlsson; Desmond Child	Desmond Child	3:37
12.	"Spanish Eyes/Lola, Lola" (Medley, music from One Night Only)	Rosa; Desmond Child; Porter; Escolar	Desmond Child; Porter; Rosa	5:49
13.	"Loaded" (George Noriega Radio Edit 2)	George Noriega; Rosa; Secada	Rosa; Noriega; Estefan	3:50
14.	"It's Alright"	Danny López; Soraya Lamilla; Javier García; George Pajon Jr.	will.i.am; López; Pajon Jr.; Ricky Martin	3:33
15.	"Pégate" (MTV Unplugged version)	Martin-Morales; Tommy Torres; Roy Tavaré	Torres; David Cabrera	4:07
16.	"Más" (Wally López Bilingual Remix)	Martin-Morales; Marco Masís; Claudia Brant; Ferras Alqaisi; Desmond Child	Desmond Child; Wally López	4:28
17.	"Shine"	Martin-Morales; Dan Keyes; Desmond Child	Desmond Child	4:47
18.	"Liar"	Martin-Morales; Lauren Christy; Alqaisi; Desmond Child	Desmond Child	3:28

DVD
No.	Title	Length
1.	"María (English Version)"	4:32
2.	"Te Extraño, Te Olvido, Te Amo"	3:59
3.	"La Copa de la Vida" (Spanglish Version)	4:06
4.	"La Bomba"	3:45
5.	"Livin' la Vida Loca"	3:42
6.	"She's All I Ever Had"	4:14
7.	"Shake Your Bon-Bon"	3:02
8.	"Private Emotion" (featuring Meja)	4:00
9.	"She Bangs"	4:05
10.	"Loaded"	4:09
11.	"Nobody Wants to Be Lonely" (with Christina Aguilera)	4:10
12.	"Jaleo" (Spanglish Version)	3:44
13.	"Juramento" (Spanglish Version)	3:28
14.	"Déjate Llevar"	3:26
15.	"Non siamo soli" (with Eros Ramazzotti)	3:40
16.	"Lo Mejor de Mi Vida Eres Tú"	4:02
17.	"Life Album Documentary" (Behind the scenes video)	11:21
18.	"Almas del Silencio EPK"	9:20

== Charts ==
=== Weekly charts ===
Chart (2013)	Peak position
Australian Albums (ARIA)	2
New Zealand Albums (RMNZ)	20

=== Year-end charts ===
Chart (2013)	Position
Australian Albums (ARIA)	45

== Certifications ==
Region	Certification	Certified units/sales
Australia (ARIA)	Gold	35,000^{^}
^{^} Shipments figures based on certification alone.

== Release history ==
Region	Date	Label	Format	Catalog
Australia	April 12, 2013	Sony Music Australia	CD/DVD	888837 179423
China		Sony Music	CD	88883724622
Indonesia		Sony Music	CD	888837 2462-2
Taiwan	May 24, 2013	Sony Music Taiwan	CD/DVD	88883717942
