= Música + Alma + Sexo World Tour =

2011 concert tour by Ricky Martin

- Tour by Ricky Martin
- Banner advertisement for the tour
- Location: North America; Europe; South America
- Associated album: Música + Alma + Sexo
- Start date: March 25, 2011
- End date: November 19, 2011
- Legs: 4
- No. of shows: 46 in North America; 15 in Europe; 21 in South America; 82 total

Ricky Martin concert chronology
- Black and White Tour (2007); Música + Alma + Sexo World Tour (2011); Ricky Martin Live (2013–14)

The Música + Alma + Sexo World Tour (also known as the M.A.S. Tour) was the eighth concert tour by Puerto Rican singer-songwriter Ricky Martin. The tour supported his ninth studio album, Música + Alma + Sexo (2011). It began with a series of concerts in Puerto Rico and North America, with international dates later in the year. The tour was his first in four years, the previous being the 2007 Black and White Tour. On the Pollstar Top 50 Worldwide Tours of the first half of 2011, Ricky Martin ranked at number 42. His tour grossed $17.7, with 37 shows and 246,141 total tickets. After visiting 28 countries throughout North America, Europe and Latin America, Ricky Martin formally ended his tour on November 12, 2011 in his homeland, Puerto Rico, at the Coliseo de Puerto Rico José Miguel Agrelot. The tour was planned to close on November 19, 2011 in Santo Domingo, however it got cancelled

== Background ==
The tour was announced on December 19, 2010, with the first show taking place in Martin's homeland of Puerto Rico. This was the second time that Martin began a world tour in the island, the first being the Black and White Tour. Martin has expressed gratitude towards his Puerto Rican fans, promising an "amazing show for everyone to enjoy." North American tour dates were announced in January 2011. Martin's wardrobe was designed exclusively by Giorgio Armani. The outfits have different themes. "I feel completely honored and excited to be working with him (Armani) again," said Martin. Armani had previously designed Martin's wardrobe for the 1998 Vuelve Tour and the 1999–2000 Livin' la Vida Loca Tour.

== Setlist ==
The following songs were performed during the concert held at the Mohegan Sun Arena, in Uncasville, Connecticut. It does not represent all songs performed on tour.
Act 1: Rock goes Pop

- "Será Será"
- "Dime Que Me Quieres"
- "It's Alright"
- "Que Día Es Hoy"
- "Vuelve"

Act 2: Cabaret

- "Livin' la Vida Loca"
- "She Bangs"
- "Shake Your Bon-Bon"
- "Loaded"
- "Basta Ya"

Act 3: Mediterráneo

- "María"
- "Tu Recuerdo"
- "El Amor de Mi Vida" / "Fuego Contra Fuego" / "Te Extraño, Te Olvido, Te Amo"
- "Frío"
- "I Am" (contains elements of "I Don't Care")

Act 4: Afrobeat

- "Más"
- "Lola, Lola"
- "La Bomba"
- "Pégate" (contains elements of "Por Arriba, Por Abajo")
- "The Cup of Life"

Encore

- "The Best Thing About Me Is You"

== Tour dates ==
Date	City	Country	Venue
North America
March 25, 2011	San Juan	Puerto Rico	José Miguel Agrelot Coliseum
March 26, 2011	San Juan	Puerto Rico	José Miguel Agrelot Coliseum
March 27, 2011	San Juan	Puerto Rico	José Miguel Agrelot Coliseum
March 28, 2011	San Juan	Puerto Rico	José Miguel Agrelot Coliseum
April 8, 2011	Orlando	United States	Amway Center
April 9, 2011	Miami	United States	American Airlines Arena
April 12, 2011	Montreal	Canada	Bell Centre
April 13, 2011	Rama	Canada	Casino Rama Entertainment Centre
April 15, 2011	Atlantic City	United States	Borgata Event Center
April 16, 2011	Newark	United States	Prudential Center
April 17, 2011	Uncasville	United States	Mohegan Sun Arena
April 19, 2011	Rosemont	United States	Allstate Arena
April 22, 2011	Grand Prairie	United States	Verizon Theatre at Grand Prairie
April 23, 2011	Houston	United States	Toyota Center
April 25, 2011	Hidalgo	United States	State Farm Arena
April 26, 2011	Laredo	United States	Laredo Energy Arena
April 28, 2011	El Paso	United States	El Paso County Coliseum
April 29, 2011	Albuquerque	United States	Sandia Casino Amphitheater
April 30, 2011	Las Vegas	United States	The Colosseum at Caesars Palace
May 4, 2011	San Jose	United States	HP Pavilion at San Jose
May 6, 2011	Los Angeles	United States	Nokia Theatre L.A. Live
May 7, 2011	Los Angeles	United States	Nokia Theatre L.A. Live
May 8, 2011	San Diego	United States	Valley View Casino Center
May 14, 2011	Mexico City	Mexico	Palacio de los Deportes
May 15, 2011	Mexico City	Mexico	Palacio de los Deportes
May 18, 2011	Guadalajara	Mexico	Arena VFG
May 19, 2011	León	Mexico	Poliforum León
May 21, 2011	Monterrey	Mexico	Monterrey Arena
May 22, 2011	Monterrey	Mexico	Monterrey Arena
May 23, 2011	Monterrey	Mexico	Monterrey Arena
Europe
June 18, 2011	Istanbul	Turkey	Turkcell Kuruçeşme Arena
June 20, 2011^{[A]}	Bursa	Turkey	Bursa Merinos Stadyumu
June 23, 2011	Lisbon	Portugal	Pavilhão Atlântico
June 24, 2011	Málaga	Spain	Auditorio Municipal de Málaga
June 25, 2011	Murcia	Spain	Plaza de Toros de Murcia
June 28, 2011	Madrid	Spain	Palacio de Deportes
June 29, 2011	Barcelona	Spain	Palau Sant Jordi
July 2, 2011^{[B]}	Rome	Italy	Auditorium Cavea
July 4, 2011^{[C]}	Verona	Italy	Verona Arena
July 6, 2011^{[C]}	Montreux	Switzerland	Auditorium Stravinski
July 8, 2011	Brussels	Belgium	Forest National
July 9, 2011^{[E]}	Mannheim	Germany	Schloßplatz Mannheim
July 10, 2011	Amsterdam	Netherlands	Heineken Music Hall
July 12, 2011	London	England	Hammersmith Apollo
July 15, 2011^{[F]}	Pori	Finland	Kirjurinluoto Arena
South America
August 26, 2011	São Paulo	Brazil	Credicard Hall
August 27, 2011	Rio de Janeiro	Brazil	Citibank Hall
August 30, 2011	Porto Alegre	Brazil	Gigantinho
September 2, 2011	Punta del Este	Uruguay	Salón Punta del Este
September 3, 2011	Montevideo	Uruguay	Velódromo Municipal de Montevideo
September 5, 2011	Córdoba	Argentina	Orfeo Superdomo
September 6, 2011	Córdoba	Argentina	Orfeo Superdomo
September 9, 2011	Asunción	Paraguay	Hipódromo de Asunción
September 10, 2011	Resistencia	Argentina	Estadio Centenario
September 11, 2011	Resistencia	Argentina	Estadio Centenario
September 13, 2011	Rosario	Argentina	Salón Metropolitano
September 14, 2011	Mar del Plata	Argentina	Polideportivo Islas Malvinas
September 16, 2011	Buenos Aires	Argentina	River Plate Stadium
September 20, 2011	Neuquén	Argentina	Estadio Ruca Che
September 22, 2011	Mendoza	Argentina	Estadio Ingelmo Nicolás Blázquez
September 24, 2011	Santiago	Chile	Movistar Arena
September 27, 2011	Lima	Peru	Estadio Monumental "U"
September 29, 2011	Guayaquil	Ecuador	Estadio Modelo Alberto Spencer Herrera
October 1, 2011	Caracas	Venezuela	Estadio de Fútbol de la USB
October 4, 2011	Valencia	Venezuela	Forum de Valencia
October 6, 2011	Maracaibo	Venezuela	Palacio de Eventos de Venezuela
North America
October 10, 2011	Panama City	Panama	Figali Convention Center
October 12, 2011	San José	Costa Rica	Estadio Ricardo Saprissa Aymá
October 14, 2011	Managua	Nicaragua	Terreno de Galerías Santo Domingo
October 16, 2011	Tegucigalpa	Honduras	Estadio Chochi Sosa
October 18, 2011	San Salvador	El Salvador	Gimnasio Nacional José Adolfo Pineda
October 20, 2011	Guatemala City	Guatemala	Forum Mundo E
October 23, 2011	Mérida	Mexico	Estadio de Béisbol Kukulkán
October 25, 2011	Villahermosa	Mexico	Estadio Centenario 27 de Febrero
October 26, 2011	Veracruz	Mexico	Estadio Luis de la Fuente
October 28, 2011	Puebla	Mexico	Auditorio Siglo XXI
October 29, 2011	Puebla	Mexico	Auditorio Siglo XXI
November 2, 2011	Mexico City	Mexico	National Auditorium
November 4, 2011	Monterrey	Mexico	Monterrey Arena
November 6, 2011	Tampico	Mexico	Centro de Convenciones de Tampico
November 12, 2011	San Juan	Puerto Rico	José Miguel Agrelot Coliseum

Festivals and other miscellaneous performances
^{A} Uluslararası Bursa Festivali
^{B} Luglio Suona Bene
^{C} Verona Jazz
^{D} Montreux Jazz Festival
^{E} Arena of Pop
^{F} Pori Jazz

=== Box office score data ===
Venue	City	Tickets sold / available	Gross sales
José Miguel Agrelot Coliseum	San Juan	53,953 / 54,081 (99%)	$3,908,348
Amway Center	Orlando	4,930 / 5,447 (91%)	$332,631
Bell Centre	Montreal	3,186 / 3,704 (86%)	$231,931
Mohegan Sun Arena	Uncasville	4,042 / 5,108 (79%)	$215,840
Verizon Theatre at Grand Prairie	Grand Prairie	4,447 / 4,506 (99%)	$286,909
The Colosseum at Caesars Palace	Las Vegas	4,003 / 4,003 (100%)	$439,863
Nokia Theatre L.A. Live	Los Angeles	13,505 / 13,792 (98%)	$882,376
Credicard Hall	São Paulo	6,573 / 7,054 (93%)	$687,386
Citibank Hall	Rio de Janeiro	3,430 / 8,433 (41%)	$340,737
Estadio Monumental "U"	Lima	6,326 / 21,000 (30%)	$444,938
Estadio Modelo Alberto Spencer Herrera	Guayaquil	9,334 / 23,000 (41%)	$603,057
Estadio de Fútbol de la USB	Caracas	4,164 / 8,809 (47%)	$1,317,620
Forum de Valencia	Valencia	5,385 / 5,904 (91%)	$1,294,980
Palacio de Eventos de Venezuela	Maracaibo	3,379 / 3,412 (99%)	$999,130
Figali Convention Center	Panama City	1,514 / 6,259 (24%)	$170,005
Estadio Ricardo Saprissa Aymá	San José	4,903 / 19,274 (25%)	$326,779
Auditorio Nacional	Mexico City	7,529 / 9,585 (79%)	$538,346
José Miguel Agrelot Coliseum	San Juan	12,379 / 12,778 (97%)	$600,282
TOTAL		152,982 / 216,149 (71%)	$13,621,158

== Crew ==
- Directed for the Stage by: Dago Gonzales
- Production & Lighting Design: Baz Halpin, Chris Nyfield (Silent House)
- Production Manager: Rich Barr
- Creative Producer: Veikko Fuhrmann
- Photography: Baz Halpin, Djeneba Aduayom
- Dancers: Melissa Chiz, Tatiana Delgado, Christopher Granitz, Gerard Heintz, Erika Marosi, Amy Miles, Conrad Pratt (Dance Captain), Sherhan Rodriguez
