= Más (Ricky Martin song) =

2011 single by Ricky Martin

Single by Ricky Martin

from the album Música + Alma + Sexo
- Released: April 5, 2011
- Recorded: 2010
- Genre: Latin pop; dance
- Length: 4:09
- Label: Columbia
- Songwriters: Desmond Child; Claudia Brant; Ricky Martin; Tainy; Ferras
- Producer: Desmond Child

Ricky Martin singles chronology
"The Best Thing About Me Is You" (2010)	"Más" (2011)	"Frío" (2011)

Music video
- "Más" on YouTube

"Más" (English: "More") is the second single from Ricky Martin's studio album, Música + Alma + Sexo (2011). It was released as a digital download on April 5, 2011.

== Background ==
In a Billboard interview, Martin describe the track: "It could be the 80s or the 90s or last Spring. Depends what generation you belong to. Martin claimed that what he wanted to do was "dance a little with this track and get away from the things you're supposed to do in life." And [he] introduce some characters there who are all artists, like Tico with his boom box in Manhattan. [He] made them up but they're real."

== Critical reception ==
The New York Post was very positive with the song, saying: "the thrill of this disc is in the bright Latin pop tune: "Más", in which Martin tries to capture the early 1990s streets of Spanish Harlem." Joey Guerra from Houston Chronicle praised the song, saying: "Más is an homage to starving artists (underground DJ, fledgling model) that plays like a sonic update on past hits "The Cup of Life" and "Livin' la Vida Loca". Grace Bastidas from Latina, positively said: ""Más" is a feel-good dance track about taking advantage of everything life has to offer without caring about what others say. It aims to jolt us like "The Cup of Life" did in 1999." Jon Pareles from The New York Times said that: "Bouncy, disco-revival beats, like those that have powered hits by Lady Gaga and The Black Eyed Peas, drive "Más" ("More"), a song about people with dreams coming to the big city." Leila Cobo from Billboard said: ""Más," is an invitation to dance with lyrics that encourage listeners to celebrate a night out."

== Commercial performance ==
"Más" reached number thirteen on Billboard's Hot Latin Songs chart, number two on Latin Pop Airplay and number thirty on Tropical Songs. With the help of remixes by Ralphi Rosario, "Más" also peaked at number seven on the Dance Club Songs chart. In Spain, the song reached number forty-three. In Mexico, "Más" peaked at number four on the Mexican Espanol Airplay and the single was certified Gold for sales of over 30,000 digital copies.

== Music video ==
Ricky Martin premiered the music video for "Más" on April 28, 2011. It was directed by Simón Brand and filmed live at the opening of the Música + Alma + Sexo World Tour in Puerto Rico. The video captures the energy of Martin on stage with his dancers and musicians, the essence of his show accompanied by the Puerto Rican audience cheered during his four performances sold out in March 2011.

== Remixes ==
On April 2, 2011, Martin recorded "Freak of Nature", an English-language version of "Más". The Wally López Bilingual Remix was released digitally on June 13, 2011. "Más" (Remixes) EP was released in the US on June 14, 2011, featuring club remixes by Ralphi Rosario and López. In Europe, "Más" (Wally López Remixes) EP was released on July 8, 2011, including three remixes by López. Three remixes (two by López and one by Rosario) were included on the Fan Edition of Música + Alma + Sexo, released in November 2011. Additionally, "Más" (Wally Bilingual Remix) was featured on the Greatest Hits (2011) and Greatest Hits: Souvenir Edition (2013) compilations, and "Freak of Nature" (Ralphi Rosario's Big Room Club Vocal Mix) was included on Playlist: The Very Best of Ricky Martin (2012).

== Live performances ==
Martin performed the bilingual version of "Más" on The Tonight Show with Jay Leno, on May 3, 2011. He also performed a medley of "Frío/Más" during the Premios Juventud on July 21, 2011. "Más" was also performed during Música + Alma + Sexo World Tour in 2011.

== Awards ==
The "Más" music video was nominated for the Premios Quiero in category Video del Año in 2011.

== Formats and track listings ==
Digital single

1. "Más" – 4:09

Digital single

1. "Más" (Wally Bilingual Remix) – 4:27

Digital EP (US)

1. "Más" – 4:09
2. "Más" (Ralphi Rosario Spanish Radio Remix) – 4:08
3. "Más" (Wally López Ibiza Es Más Radio RMX) – 4:27

Digital EP (Europe)

1. "Más" (Wally López Factomania in Miami RMX) – 4:20
2. "Más" (Wally López Ibiza Es Más Radio RMX) – 4:27
3. "Más" (Wally López Ibiza Es Más RMX) – 7:11

Promotional CD single (US)

1. "Más" (Ralphi Rosario Spanish Club Vocal) – 7:50
2. "Más" (Ralphi Rosario Spanish Radio Edit) – 4:08
3. "Más" (Wally López Ibiza Es Más Vocal) – 7:11
4. "Más" (Wally López Factomania in Miami Vocal) – 4:20
5. "Más" (Wally López Ibiza Es Más Radio Edit) – 4:27

Promotional CD single (US)

1. "Freak of Nature" (Ralphi Rosario's Big Room Club Vocal) – 8:09
2. "Freak of Nature" (Ralphi Rosario's Big Room Dub)
3. "Freak of Nature" (Ralphi Rosario's Club Vocal)
4. "Freak of Nature" (Ralphi Rosario's Radio Edit)

== Charts and certifications ==
=== Weekly charts ===
Chart (2011)	Peak position
Mexico (Billboard Mexican Airplay)	7
Spain (Promusicae)	43
Ukraine Airplay (TopHit)	80
US Dance Club Songs (Billboard) "Freak of Nature"	7
US Hot Latin Songs (Billboard)	13
US Tropical Airplay (Billboard)	30

=== Year-end charts ===
Chart (2011)	Position
US Latin Pop Songs (Billboard)	28

=== Certifications and sales ===
Region	Certification	Certified units/sales
Mexico (AMPROFON)	Gold	30,000^{*}
^{*} Sales figures based on certification alone.
