= Música + Alma + Sexo =

2011 studio album by Ricky Martin

Studio album by Ricky Martin
- Released: January 31, 2011
- Recorded: 2010
- Genre: Pop; pop rock; reggae; dance; Latin pop
- Length: 53:28
- Language: Spanish; English
- Label: Columbia; Sony Music Latin
- Producer: Desmond Child

Ricky Martin chronology
17 (2008)	Música + Alma + Sexo (2011)	Greatest Hits (2011)

Singles from Música + Alma + Sexo
- 1. "The Best Thing About Me Is You/ Lo Mejor De Mi Vida Eres Tú" Released: November 2, 2010; 2. "Más" Released: April 5, 2011; 3. "Frío" Released: July 11, 2011; 4. "Samba" Released: September 18, 2011

Música + Alma + Sexo (English: Music + Soul + Sex) is the ninth studio album by Puerto Rican singer-songwriter Ricky Martin. It was released on January 31, 2011, in Europe by Columbia Records and on February 1, 2011, in North America by Sony Music Latin. The album features guest appearances by Joss Stone, Natalia Jiménez, Claudia Leitte and Puerto Rican reggaeton duo Wisin & Yandel, with contributions from musicians including Tommy Denander, John 5 and Josh Freese. It consists of songs in Spanish and English.

The deluxe edition was released at Target. It contains seven exclusive tracks, including two dance mixes, two English versions ("Liar", which is an English version of "No Te Miento", and "Too Late Now", an English version of "Será Será"), an unreleased song and solo versions of the singles "The Best Thing About Me Is You" and "Lo mejor de mi vida eres tú". The album was re-released to digital outlets on November 14, 2011, under the title Más Música + Alma + Sexo, containing new bonus material and remixes.

The album received a Diamond certification for sales of over 300,000 copies. It has sold 112,000 copies in the US as of February 2015.

== Background ==
In a Billboard interview, Martin revealed that he wrote the album between Miami and his home in Golden Beach, Florida. Desmond Child practically moved in with his entire family. He said that: "[We] had two studios: one for the programmer, another to record bass, guitars and drums". Talking about the album style, Ricky said: "It’s more up-tempo because I’m at a point in my life where I simply want to be, and be free and not be contrived at all." Martin revealed that he and his team "wrote at least 60 songs and obviously, not all are in here". The ones that felt right are in the album. I think there are songs here that can become ballads. The most important thing about this album is it’s for the audience, but also for musicians. There’s great musicianship here."

== Promotion and singles ==
Ricky Martin began a series of concerts in Puerto Rico, United States and Canada as part of his Música + Alma + Sexo World Tour. This is the eighth concert tour presented by Martin. The tour also visited Europe, and Central and South America.

- "The Best Thing About Me Is You" was released as first single from the album on November 2, 2010. It debuted at number seventy-four on the Billboard Hot 100. The Spanish-language version of the song, entitled "Lo mejor de mi vida eres tú", reached number one on Hot Latin Songs.
- "Shine" was released as a digital download on December 21, 2010, as part of the promotion of Música + Alma + Sexo. It is not considered as an official single. The Spanish-language version is also included on the album and it is called "Te Vas".
- "Más" was released as the second official single on April 5, 2011. The song has reached number thirteen on the Billboard Latin Songs and number two on the Latin Pop Songs.
- "Frío" (Remix) was released as the third single on July 11, 2011. Ricky Martin shot the music video with Wisin & Yandel in Buenos Aires on June 6, 2011.
- "Samba" was released exclusively in Brazil as a joint-single with Brazilian singer Claudia Leitte. Despite this, "Samba" is an official Música + Alma + Sexo promo single. The music video premiered on September 18, 2011.

== Chart performance ==
Música + alma + sexo debuted at number three on the US Billboard 200, selling 32,000 copies. The album became the highest charting, primarily-Spanish language album, since Selena's number one album Dreaming of You. This also represents the highest ever chart debut for a Sony Music Latin release.

Música + alma + sexo is Martin's highest-charting album since Ricky Martin debuted at number one in May 1999. It's his fourth top ten album, and his first (mostly) Spanish language album to hit the mark. Martin's previous highest-charting Spanish language album was Almas del silencio. It was the Best Selling Album of 2011 in Argentina. In total, the album has sold more than 300,000 copies worldwide.

== Critical reception ==
Professional ratings
Aggregate scores
Source	Rating
Metacritic	(72/100)
Review scores
Source	Rating
About.com	4/5 stars
Allmusic	3/5 stars
Billboard	(positive)
Canal Pop	3/5 stars
Club Fonograma	(48/100)
Evigshed Mag	(10/10)
Houston Chronicle	2.5/4 stars
Latina	(positive)
Los Angeles Times	2.5/4 stars
New York Post	3/5 stars
The New York Times	(positive)

Upon its release, the album received generally favorable reviews from most music critics, based on an aggregate score of 72/100 from Metacritic. Stephen Thomas Erlewine from Allmusic rated it 3 stars (out of 5) and said that: "Theoretically, this loosening of expectations would give him some freedom to roam on Música + Alma + Sexo, and it does to the extent that he does not feel compelled to devote the record to the English language". The Billboard review was positive and went to say that: "Martin largely shuns easy romanticism for more assertive messages that celebrate liberation and diversity, themes that can be associated with his coming out last year". Ernesto Lechner from Los Angeles Times was favorable in his review, saying that: "Martin rarely transcends the narrow parameters of commercial Latin music, but the sincerity of his vision places him one step ahead of the competition". Jon Pareles from The New York Times was more positive, saying that: "On this album his usual exhortations to seize life's pleasures mingle with coming-out manifestos, and he smiles through them all".

Carlos Quintana from About.com rated it four stars (out of five) and positively reviewed the album, commenting that: "Música + Alma + Sexo is an album that reflects Ricky's present and offers a variety of vibrant and relaxing songs that are filled with deep meanings". Dan Aquilante from the New York Post said that: "Ricky Martin is back to his Latin roots with a mostly Spanish-language album of cutting-edge dance and pop. There are arena ballads, such as the pretty love song "Tú y Yo," but the thrill of this disc is in the bright Latin pop tunes, such as "Más," in which Martin tries to capture the early '90s streets of Spanish Harlem." Joey Guerra from Houston Chronicle went to say that: "Martin is making hips move and hearts soar… [with] symphonic arrangements [and] stomping dance-rock grooves… Shine has a whiff of nostalgia and is Martin’s most appealing English-language song in years." Grace Bastidas from Latina (magazine) opined, positively, that: "the pop album feels like a dream come true for Martin, who has been in the spotlight since he joined Menudo as a 12-year-old, and can finally be himself. He brims with pride throughout—and it’s definitely infectious".

== Awards and nominations ==
Year	Ceremony	Award	Result
2011	Premios Juventud	Your Favorite CD	Nominated
2011	Premios People en Español	Best Album	Nominated
2012	Lo Nuestro Awards	Pop Album of the Year	Nominated
2012	Latin Billboard Music Awards	Latin Pop Album of the Year	Nominated
2012	GLAAD Media Awards	Outstanding Music Artist	Won
2012	Premios Juventud	My Favorite Concert	Nominated

== Track listing ==
- All songs produced by Desmond Child, except "Frío" (Remix) produced by Desmond Child, Wisin & Yandel and Tainy.

Standard edition^{[f]}
No.	Title	Lyrics	Music	Length
1.	"Más"	Ricky Martin; Claudia Brant; Marco Masis; Ferras Alqaisi; Desmond Child	Brant; Masis; Alqaisi; Child	4:09
2.	"Frío"	Martin; Juan Luis Morera; Llandel Veguilla; Masis; Child	Morera; Veguilla; Masis; Child	3:22
3.	"Lo Mejor de Mi Vida Eres Tú" (featuring Natalia Jiménez)	Martin; Brant; Andreas Carlsson; Child	Brant; Eric Bazilian; Carlsson; Child	3:38
4.	"Te Vas"	Martin; Lester Mendez; Dan Keyes; Brant; Child	Mendez; Keyes; Brant; Child	4:30
5.	"Tú y Yo"	Martin; Brant; Child	Brant; Child	6:15
6.	"Cántame tu Vida"	Martin; Brant; Mendez; David Cabrera; Child	Brant; Cabrera; Mendez; Child	4:38
7.	"Te Busco y Te Alcanzo"	Martin; Fernando Osorio; Lauren Christy; Alqaisi; Child	Osorio; Christy; Alqaisi; Child	3:28
8.	"Será será"	Martin; Brant; Alqaisi; Masis; Child	Brant; Masis; Alqaisi; Child	3:27
9.	"No te Miento"	Martin; Jodi Marr; Christy; Alqaisi; Child	Marr; Christy; Alqaisi; Child	3:30
10.	"Basta Ya"	Martin; Brant; Mendez; Cabrera; Federico Vindver; Child	Brant; Mendez; Cabrera; Vindver; Child	4:30
11.	"The Best Thing About Me Is You" (featuring Joss Stone)	Martin; Bazilian; Carlsson; Child	Bazilian; Carlsson; Child	3:37
12.	"Shine"	Martin; Mendez; Keyes; Child	Mendez; Keyes; Child	4:46
13.	"Frío (Remix)" (featuring Wisin & Yandel)	Martin; Morera; Veguilla; Masis; Child	Morera; Veguilla; Masis; Child	3:36

Austrian and German bonus track
No.	Title	Length
14.	"The Best Thing About Me Is You" (feat. Edita)	3:37

Target deluxe edition bonus tracks
No.	Title	Length
14.	"Too Late Now"	3:27
15.	"Liar"	3:30
16.	"Soñador"	4:35
17.	"Lo Mejor de Mi Vida Eres Tú (Spanish Jump Smokers Dance Version)"	4:42
18.	"The Best Thing About Me Is You (Jump Smokers Dance Version)"	5:13
19.	"Lo Mejor de Mi Vida Eres Tú (Solo Version)"	3:38
20.	"The Best Thing About Me Is You (Solo Version)"	3:36

Brazilian edition
No.	Title	Length
1.	"Más"	4:09
2.	"Frío"	3:22
3.	"The Best Thing About Me is You" (feat. Joss Stone)	3:38
4.	"Te Vas"	4:30
5.	"Tú y Yo"	6:15
6.	"Cántame tu Vida"	4:38
7.	"Te Busco y te Alcanzo"	3:28
8.	"Too Late Now"	3:27
9.	"Samba (Deeplick Carnival Mix)" (feat. Claudia Leitte)	4:32
10.	"Shine"	4:46
11.	"Basta Ya"	4:30
12.	"Liar"	3:30
13.	"Samba (Dub2deep Remix)" (feat. Claudia Leitte)	4:57

US Fan Edition (CD)
No.	Title	Length
1.	"Lo Mejor de Mi Vida Eres Tú" (feat. Natalia Jiménez)	3:38
2.	"The Best Thing About Me Is You" (feat. Joss Stone)	3:38
3.	"Más"	4:09
4.	"Frío (Remix Radio Edit)" (feat. Wisin & Yandel)	3:36
5.	"Tú y Yo"	6:15
6.	"Basta Ya"	4:30
7.	"Too Late Now"	3:27
8.	"Liar"	3:30
9.	"Soñador"	4:34
10.	"Samba" (feat. Claudia Leitte)	3:08
11.	"Lo Mejor de Mi Vida Eres Tú (Spanish Jump Smokers Dance Version)"	4:41
12.	"The Best Thing About Me Is You (Jump Smokers Dance Version)"	5:10
13.	"Más (Wally López Ibiza Es Más Radio RMX)"	4:26
14.	"Más (Wally López Bilingual Remix)"	4:26
15.	"Más (Ralphi Rosario Spanish Radio Remix)"	4:07
16.	"Frío (Wally López Remix)"	3:15

South American Fan Edition (CD) / US Fan Edition (digital)
No.	Title	Length
1.	"Más"	4:09
2.	"Frío"	3:22
3.	"Lo Mejor de Mi Vida Eres Tú" (feat. Natalia Jiménez)	3:38
4.	"Te Vas"	4:30
5.	"Tú y Yo"	6:15
6.	"Cántame tu Vida"	4:38
7.	"Te busco y Te Alcanzo"	3:28
8.	"Será Será"	3:27
9.	"No te Miento"	3:30
10.	"Basta Ya"	4:30
11.	"The Best Thing About Me Is You" (feat. Joss Stone)	3:37
12.	"Shine"	4:46
13.	"Frío (Remix Radio Edit)" (feat. Wisin & Yandel)	3:36
14.	"Too Late Now"	3:27
15.	"Liar"	3:30
16.	"Soñador"	4:34
17.	"Samba" (feat. Claudia Leitte)	3:08
18.	"Lo Mejor de Mi Vida Eres Tú (Spanish Jump Smokers Dance Version)"	4:41
19.	"The Best Thing About Me Is You (Jump Smokers Dance Version)"	5:10
20.	"Más (Wally López Ibiza Es Más Radio RMX)"	4:26
21.	"Más (Wally López Bilingual Remix)"	4:26
22.	"Más (Ralphi Rosario Spanish Radio Remix)"	4:07
23.	"Frío (Wally López Remix)"	3:15

Fan Edition (DVD)
No.	Title	Length
1.	"Lo Mejor de Mi Vida Eres Tú"
2.	"The Best Thing About Me Is You"
3.	"Frío"
4.	"Samba"

== Charts ==
=== Weekly charts ===
Chart (2011)	Peak position
Argentine Albums (CAPIF)	1
Belgian Albums (Ultratop Wallonia)	82
Canadian Albums (Billboard)	60
Ecuadorian Albums (Musicalisimo)	5
Greek Foreign Albums (IFPI)	5
Italian Albums (FIMI)	52
Mexico (Top 100 Mexico)	2
Spanish Albums (PROMUSICAE)	3
Swiss Albums (Schweizer Hitparade)	49
US Billboard 200	3
US Top Latin Albums (Billboard)	1
US Latin Pop Albums (Billboard)	1
Venezuelan Albums (Recordland)	1

=== Year-end charts ===
Chart (2011)	Position
Argentine Albums (CAPIF)	1
Mexican Albums (AMPROFON)	40
US Top Latin Albums (Billboard)	8
US Latin Pop Albums (Billboard)	6

== Certifications and sales ==
Region	Certification	Certified units/sales
Argentina (CAPIF)	Platinum	40,000^{^}
Chile (IFPI Chile)	2× Platinum	
Colombia (ASINCOL)	2× Platinum	
France	—	32,000
Mexico (AMPROFON)	Platinum	60,000^{^}
United States (RIAA)	Gold (Latin)	50,000^{^}
United States (RIAA) (Deluxe Edition)	Platinum (Latin)	100,000^{^}
Venezuela (AVINPRO)	Platinum	
^{^} Shipments figures based on certification alone.

== Release history ==
Region	Date	Label	Format	Catalog
Europe	January 31, 2011	Sony Music Entertainment	CD	88697544722
North America	February 1, 2011	Sony Music Latin	CD	754472
Taiwan	February 1, 2011	Sony Music	CD	88697544722
Australia	February 11, 2011	Sony Music Entertainment	CD	88697544722
Austria, Germany	February 25, 2011	Sony Music Entertainment	CD	88697841132
Japan	March 16, 2011	Sony Music Japan	CD	SICP-3025
Brazil	April 15, 2011	Sony Music Entertainment	CD	886978411228
United Kingdom	April 18, 2011	Sony Music Entertainment	CD	88697544722
United States	November 14, 2011	Sony Music Latin	digital	
United States	November 15, 2011	Sony Music Latin	CD/DVD	886979827424
South America	November 22, 2011	Sony Music Latin	CD/DVD	7987202

== See also ==
- List of number-one Billboard Latin Albums from the 2010s
- List of number-one Billboard Latin Pop Albums from the 2010s
