= The Best Thing About Me Is You =

2010 single by Ricky Martin

"The Best Thing About Me Is You / Lo Mejor de Mi Vida Eres Tú"

Single by Ricky Martin featuring Joss Stone or Natalia Jiménez

from the album Música + Alma + Sexo
- Released: November 2, 2010
- Recorded: Miami
- Genre: Latin pop; reggae
- Length: 3:36
- Label: Columbia
- Songwriters: Eric Bazilian; Claudia Brant; Andreas Carlsson; Desmond Child; Ricky Martin
- Producer: Desmond Child

Ricky Martin singles chronology
"Non siamo soli" (2007)	"The Best Thing About Me Is You / Lo Mejor de Mi Vida Eres Tú" (2010)	"Más" (2011)

Joss Stone singles chronology
"Free Me" (2009)	"The Best Thing About Me is You" (2010)	"While You're Out Looking for Sugar" (2012)

Natalia Jimenez singles chronology
"Me Dueles" (2009)	"Lo Mejor de Mi Vida Eres Tú" (2010)	"Por ser tu mujer" (2011)

Music video
- "The Best Thing About Me Is You" "Lo Mejor de Mi Vida Eres Tú" on YouTube

"The Best Thing About Me Is You" is a song by the Puerto Rican recording artist Ricky Martin, taken from his ninth studio album, Música + Alma + Sexo (2011). It was digitally released as the lead single from the album on November 2, 2010. The song had earlier premiered on radio's Ryan Seacrest show. The original English version of the song features singer Joss Stone, while its Spanish version, "Lo Mejor de Mi Vida Eres Tú", replaces Stone's vocals with Natalia Jiménez. "The Best Thing About Me Is You" was later featured on three of Martin's compilations: Greatest Hits (2011), Playlist: The Very Best of Ricky Martin (2012) and Greatest Hits: Souvenir Edition (2013).

== Background and composition ==
In a Billboard interview, Martin described the track: "I told Desmond -- and I'm not making comparisons -- but "Don't Worry, Be Happy" is great. That's how this song came to be. From being in a very cool place in my life." The song combines the reggae rhythms with Latin and pop in the music and lyrics by Claudia Brant, Desmond Child, Andreas Carlsson, Eric Bazilian and Ricky Martin.

== Critical reception ==
Carlos Quintana from About.com, positively reviewed the track, saying: "this song is probably the most reflective, inspiring and positive of the whole album." Ernesto Lechner from the Los Angeles Times said that "the lyrics of "The Best Thing About Me Is You," a duet with Joss Stone, sound a bit forced in English, the Spanish version of the tune crackles with bonhomie." Joey Guerra from Houston Chronicle praised the Spanish version, saying: "he lightens up a bit on "Lo Mejor de Mi Vida Eres Tú", that boasts an easy chemistry," but criticized the English-language version, calling it: "less successful" because of "Joss Stone’s habitual oversinging." Grace Bastidas from Latina said: "The first single from the album, "Lo Mejor de Mi Vida Eres Tú" features Spanish siren Natalia Jiménez—Joss Stone duets in the English-language track—and is the definition of happiness. There's even some laughing and giggling at the end of the song in case you're not already smiling." Leila Cobo from Billboard said that the song is "a feel-good ditty over a happy reggae beat."

== Commercial performance ==
The single topped the US Hot Latin Songs chart for two weeks and Latin Pop Airplay for five weeks. On other Billboard charts, it reached number seven on Tropical Songs, number thirty-seven on Latin Rhythm Airplay, number forty on Regional Mexican Airplay and number seventy four on the Billboard Hot 100. In Mexico, the song reached number three and was certified Platinum for sales of over 60,000 digital copies. It also charted in European countries, including number twenty-five in Spain.

== Music video ==
The music video was filmed on December 20 and 21, 2010 in Miami, Florida and directed by Carlos Pérez. The video for the English version premiered on Martin's Vevo channel on January 11, 2011. Joss Stone does not appear in the video. The Spanish version of the video was released on Univision and also does not feature Natalia Jiménez.

== Live performances ==
Martin performed the song with Joss Stone for the very first time on The Oprah Winfrey Show on November 2, 2010. He also performed it during the 2011 Música + Alma + Sexo World Tour.

== Awards ==
Year	Ceremony	Award	Result
2011	Latin Grammy Awards	Record of the Year	Nominated
2011	Latin Grammy Awards	Song of the Year	Nominated
2011	Latin Grammy Awards	Best Short Form Music Video	Nominated
2011	Premios Juventud	The Perfect Combination	Nominated
2011	Premios Juventud	Catchiest Tune	Nominated
2011	Premios Juventud	My Favorite Video	Nominated
2012	ASCAP Latin Awards	Pop Winning Song	Won
2012	BMI Latin Awards	Award-Winning Songs	Won
2012	Premio Lo Nuestro	Pop Song of the Year	Nominated
2012	Premio Lo Nuestro	Collaboration of the Year	Nominated

== Formats and track listings ==
Digital singles

1. "The Best Thing About Me Is You" featuring Joss Stone – 3:36
2. "Lo Mejor de Mi Vida Eres Tú" featuring Natalia Jiménez – 3:36

European digital remixes

1. "The Best Thing About Me Is You" featuring Joss Stone (Jump Smokers Radio Edit) – 4:26
2. "Lo Mejor de Mi Vida Eres Tú" featuring Natalia Jiménez (Spanish Jump Smokers Radio Edit) – 4:27
3. "The Best Thing About Me Is You" featuring Joss Stone (Jump Smokers Dance Version) – 5:13
4. "Lo Mejor de Mi Vida Eres Tú" featuring Natalia Jiménez (Spanish Jump Smokers Dance Version) – 4:42

German digital single

1. "The Best Thing About Me Is You" featuring Edita – 3:36

Mexican promotional single

1. "Lo Mejor de Mi Vida Eres Tú" featuring Jenni Rivera (banda version) – 3:29

US Target edition album bonus tracks

1. "The Best Thing About Me Is You" (Solo Version) – 3:36
2. "Lo Mejor de Mi Vida Eres Tú" (Solo Version) – 3:38

== Charts and certifications ==
=== Weekly charts ===
Chart (2010–2011)	Peak position
Belgium (Ultratip Bubbling Under Flanders)	39
Belgium (Ultratip Bubbling Under Wallonia)	4
Brazil Hot 100 Airplay (Billboard)	93
Brazil Hot Pop Songs	39
Hungary (Rádiós Top 40)	21
Mexico (Billboard Mexican Airplay) "Lo Mejor de Mi Vida Eres Tú"	8
Mexico (Monitor Latino) "Lo Mejor de Mi Vida Eres Tú"	3
Netherlands (Single Top 100)	99
Russia Airplay (Tophit) "The Best Thing About Me Is You (Jump Smokers Dance Version)	209
Spain (Promusicae) "Lo Mejor de Mi Vida Eres Tú"	25
US Billboard Hot 100 "Lo Mejor de Mi Vida Eres Tú"	74
US Hot Latin Songs (Billboard) "Lo Mejor de Mi Vida Eres Tú"	1
US Regional Mexican Airplay (Billboard) "Lo Mejor de Mi Vida Eres Tú"	40
US Tropical Airplay (Billboard) "Lo Mejor de Mi Vida Eres Tú"	7

=== Year-end charts ===
Chart (2011)	Position
US Hot Latin Songs (Billboard) "Lo Mejor de Mi Vida Eres Tú"	24

Chart (2017)	Position
Nicaragua Pop (Monitor Latino)	85

Chart (2018)	Position
Puerto Rico Pop (Monitor Latino)	70

Chart (2023)	Position
Dominican Republic Pop (Monitor Latino)	83

=== Certifications and sales ===
Region	Certification	Certified units/sales
Mexico (AMPROFON)	Platinum	60,000^{*}
^{*} Sales figures based on certification alone.

== See also ==
- List of number-one Billboard Top Latin Songs of 2011
- List of number-one Billboard Hot Latin Pop Airplay of 2010
- List of number-one Billboard Hot Latin Pop Airplay of 2011
