= Ricky Martin videography =

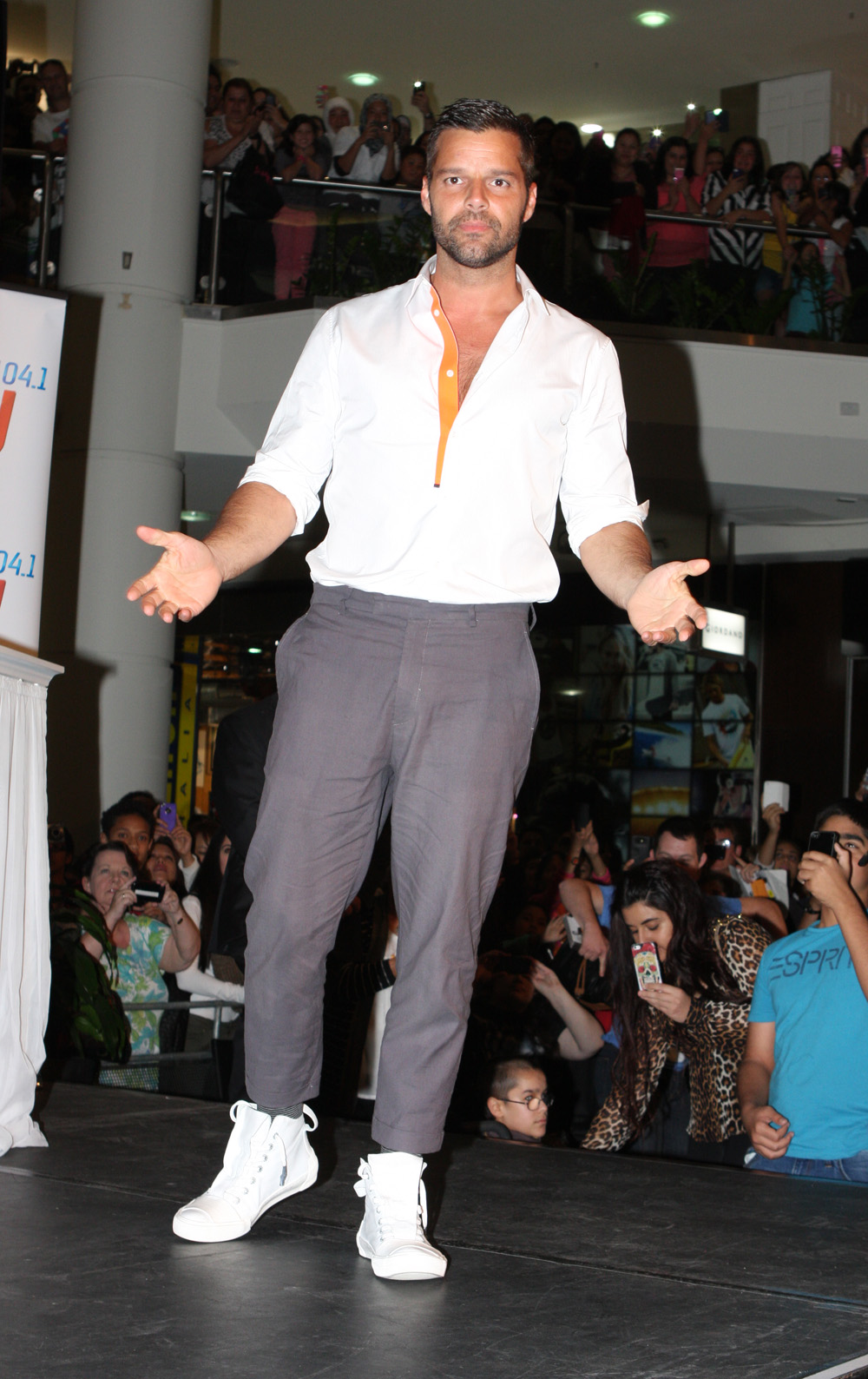
Ricky Martin in Sydney

Puerto Rican singer, songwriter and actor Ricky Martin has released four video albums and appeared in sixty-two music videos, twelve films, thirteen television programs, and several television commercials. He ranks among the greatest music video artists of all time and is regarded as a video icon.

In 1991, Martin released his debut single "Fuego Contra Fuego", as the lead single for his first solo album, Ricky Martin alongside the accompanying music video. The music video for "Te Extraño, Te Olvido, Te Amo", the lead single from his third studio album A Medio Vivir (1995), was directed by Gustavo Garzón and won Lo Nuestro Award for Video of the Year. He filmed a remake video for the song in August 1997 in France which was directed by Christophe Gstalder. Four separate videos were released for "María", the second single from the album. The first uses the original track from the A Medio Vivir album and shows Martin performing the song on a stage at a concert, with some shots of him singing and dancing to the song in the colorful barrio of La Boca in Buenos Aires with the local people. The second version is set to the Pablo Flores Remix of the song and uses scenes and shots of the original video plus added takes of Martin performing in concert or at the barrio, close shots of locals dancing, etc. Both the original and the remix video were released in 1995. A third version, the least known, was filmed to the Pablo Flores Spanglish Remix in 1997. The last version was shot in France and directed by Memo del Bosque in 1997. Also set to the Pablo Flores Remix of the song, this version of the video is considered to be the official version, and is also the most popular. In 1997, Ricky Martin recorded the music video for the song "No Importa La Distancia", the official Spanish version of "Go the Distance" by Michael Bolton, for the movie Hercules. It was the first time that Disney adapted one of its promotional themes for Latin America and it was a great international success.

The music video for "Vuelve", the lead single from his fourth studio album Vuelve (1998), was shot by Wayne Isham in December 1997 at the interior of the Ennis House in Los Angeles and released in January 1998. Three separate videos were released for "The Cup of Life", the second single from the album. Three more singles, accompanied with separate music videos were released from the album.

The video for "Livin' la Vida Loca", the first single from Martin's self-titled debut English-language album, directed by Wayne Isham and starring Croatian model Nina Morić, was shot in Los Angeles. It aired later the same month and received six nominations at the 1999 MTV Video Music Awards including Video of the Year, Best Male Video, Best Choreography in a Video and Viewer's Choice. It won two primary awards for Best Pop Video, and Best Dance Video, and was voted three additional awards in the international Viewers Choice categories. It also won Ritmo Latino Music Award for Music Video of the Year. The video features Ricky Martin performing in a pub with his band and hanging out with a lady (Nina Morić) at different locations, including New York City. One scene shows several dancers taking their shirts off and performing choreographed dance moves while it rains; this scene coincides with the line in the pre-chorus "She'll make you take your clothes off and go dancing in the rain". Various snippets of the video seem to merge into each other over the duration of the song. Towards the end of the video, Martin gets distracted by his lady passenger while driving, causing him to drive erratically and causing another car to veer and hit a fire hydrant, releasing a fountain of water; this was also the first scene of the video. Three more singles, accompanied with separate music videos were released from the album.

The music video for "She Bangs", the lead single from his sixth studio album Sound Loaded (2000), was directed by Wayne Isham and shot at the Atlantis Paradise Island hotel in the Bahamas. The singer described the concept of the video as being part of a trilogy with "María" and "Livin' la Vida Loca", "with this girl who drives me crazy because she's crazy, she won't talk to me or tell me her name". Martin told Univision he envisioned the visual taking place in Atlantis and felt that the Bahamas was the perfect place to film it. Jamie King helped with the creative direction of the video and over 100 people were involved in the production process. A body double for Martin was used during the scenes with sharks. The Spanish version of the music video premiered on September 26, 2000 for the Hispanophone market, while the English version debuted on MTV's Making the Video series the following day. The video begins with a group of women on a beach at night swimming to an underwater nightclub, with Martin following them. Martin explained that filming the scene was hard for him because he had to resist without taking air for a long time, as well as having to mime the lyrics without blowing bubbles out of his mouth. Upon entering the nightclub, Martin proceeds to sing "She Bangs" as he dances with the people in the club, with several scenes resembling an orgy. In one scene, Martin sees himself being seduced by mermaids and is later taken into a closet, in which he dances erotically with several women. Near the end of the visual, Martin spills a bottle of water on himself and the people nearby him. The music video concludes with him returning to the surface at daylight. At the 2nd Annual Latin Grammy Awards in 2001, Martin and Isham won the award for Best Short Form Music Video. In the same year, it was the Video of the Year at the 13th Lo Nuestro Awards. Two music videos for his next single, "Nobody Wants to Be Lonely" were directed by Wayne Isham in Coral Gables, Florida, which first aired on January 15, 2001. One music video is set to the English-language duet 'Nobody Wants to Be Lonely' with Christina Aguilera, while the other is set to the Spanish-language solo 'Sólo Quiero Amarte'.

In 2003, Martin released "Tal Vez", as the lead single for his seventh studio album, Almas del Silencio (2003). The accompanying music video, directed by Kacho Lopez and Carlos Pérez, aired in March 2003. Four more singles, accompanied with separate music videos were released from the album.

The music videos for "I Don't Care", the lead single for his eighth studio album, Life (2005), and its Spanish version "Qué Más Da" were filmed in Brooklyn, New York City, and directed by Diane Martel. The video for the English version features Fat Joe and Amerie, and the Spanish version features Fat Joe and Debi Nova. Both videos premiered simultaneously in September 2005.

In 2006, Martin released his first live album, MTV Unplugged accompanied with a video album and won Best Long Form Music Video at the 8th Annual Latin Grammy Awards.

The music video for The Best Thing About Me Is You the lead single for his ninth studio album, Música + Alma + Sexo (2011) was filmed on December 20 and 21, 2010 in Miami, Florida and directed by Carlos Pérez. The video for the English version premiered on Martin's Vevo channel on January 11, 2011. Joss Stone does not appear in the video. The Spanish version of the video was released on Univision and also does not feature Natalia Jiménez. It was nominated as the Best Short Form Music Video at the 12th Annual Latin Grammy Awards.

In 2015, he released his tenth studio album, A Quien Quiera Escuchar. Four singles were released from the album with separate music videos. The music video for its third single, "La Mordidita" received over one billion views on YouTube. The Music video for his 2016 single "Vente Pa' Ca" featuring Colombian singer Maluma received over 1.6 billion views on YouTube and is Martin's most viewed video to date.

In 2020, he released his first extended play, Pausa. The music video for its second single, "Tiburones" was filmed in Puerto Rico and directed by Kacho Lopez. It shows Martin walking in front of an armoured vehicle while police in riot gear face off against what appears to be a citizen protest. The tension is palpable, but what unfolds is a massive street party as the protest turns into a celebration, the police dropping their helmets and weapons to join in. It was nominated as Video with a Purpose in 2020 Premios Juventud.

He also acted on stage and TV in Mexico, where he achieved modest fame in the early 1990s. In 1994, he appeared on the US TV soap opera General Hospital as a Puerto Rican singer. In 2018, he portrayed Antonio D'Amico in the miniseries The Assassination of Gianni Versace: American Crime Story, which earned him a nomination for the Primetime Emmy Award for Outstanding Supporting Actor in a Limited Series or Movie.

== Music videos ==
=== As lead artist ===
List of music videos as lead artist, with other performers, directors, album title and showing year released
Title	Other performer(s)	Director(s)	Album	Year
"Fuego Contra Fuego"	—N/a	—N/a	Ricky Martin	1991
"El Amor de Mi Vida"	—N/a	—N/a	Ricky Martin	1991
"Vuelo"	—N/a	—N/a	Ricky Martin	1992
"Dime Que Me Quieres"	—N/a	—N/a	Ricky Martin	1992
"Susana"	—N/a	—N/a	Ricky Martin	1992
"Juego de Ajedrez"	—N/a	—N/a	Ricky Martin	1992
"Me Amaras"	—N/a	—N/a	Me Amaras	1993
"Que Día Es Hoy" (Remix)	—N/a	—N/a	Me Amaras	1993
"Te Extraño, Te Olvido, Te Amo"	—N/a	Gustavo Garzón	A Medio Vivir	1995
"María"	—N/a	—N/a	A Medio Vivir	1995
"María" (Remix)	—N/a	—N/a	A Medio Vivir	1995
"Fuego de Noche, Nieve de Día"	—N/a	Gustavo Garzón	A Medio Vivir	1996
"Bombón De Azúcar"	—N/a	—N/a	A Medio Vivir	1996
"Volverás"	—N/a	—N/a	A Medio Vivir	1996
"María" (Version Salsa & Merengue)	—N/a	—N/a	A Medio Vivir	1996
"Dónde Estarás"	—N/a	Pedro Aznar	A Medio Vivir	1997
"No Importa la Distancia"	—N/a	Dani Jacobs	Hercules Soundtrack	1997
"Te Extraño, Te Olvido, Te Amo" (Remake Video)	—N/a	Christophe Gstalder	A Medio Vivir	1997
"María" (Remake Video)	—N/a	Memo del Bosque	A Medio Vivir	1997
"Vuelve"	—N/a	Wayne Isham	Vuelve	1998
"The Cup of Life"	—N/a	Wayne Isham	Vuelve	1998
"La Copa de la Vida" (Spanish version)	—N/a	Wayne Isham	Vuelve	1998
"La Copa de la Vida" (Spanglish version)	—N/a	Wayne Isham	Vuelve	1998
"La Bomba"	—N/a	Wayne Isham	Vuelve	1998
"Por Arriba, Por Abajo"	—N/a	Pedro Aznar	Vuelve	1998
"Perdido Sin Ti"	—N/a	Gustavo Garzón	Vuelve	1998
"Livin' la Vida Loca"	—N/a	Wayne Isham	Ricky Martin	1999
"Livin' la Vida Loca" (Spanish version)	—N/a	Wayne Isham	Ricky Martin	1999
"She's All I Ever Had"	—N/a	Nigel Dick	Ricky Martin	1999
"Bella"	—N/a	Nigel Dick	Ricky Martin	1999
"Shake Your Bon-Bon"	—N/a	Wayne Isham	Ricky Martin	1999
"Private Emotion"	Meja	Francis Lawrence	Ricky Martin	2000
"Private Emotion"	Sertab Erener	Francis Lawrence	Ricky Martin	2000
"She Bangs"	—N/a	Wayne Isham	Sound Loaded	2000
"She Bangs" (Spanish version)	—N/a	Wayne Isham	Sound Loaded	2000
"Nobody Wants to Be Lonely"	Christina Aguilera	Wayne Isham	Sound Loaded	2001
"Sólo Quiero Amarte"	—N/a	Wayne Isham	Sound Loaded	2001
"Loaded"	—N/a	Bob Giraldi	Sound Loaded	2001
"Dame Más (Loaded)"	—N/a	Bob Giraldi	Sound Loaded	2001
"Tal Vez"	—N/a	Kacho López Mari and Carlos Pérez	Almas Del Silencio	2003
"Jaleo"	—N/a	Kacho López Mari and Carlos Pérez	Almas Del Silencio	2003
"Juramento"	—N/a	Joseph Kahn	Almas Del Silencio	2003
"Juramento" (The Way To Love)	—N/a	Joseph Kahn	Almas Del Silencio	2003
"Y Todo Queda En Nada"	—N/a	Gustavo Garzón	Almas Del Silencio	2004
"I Don't Care"	Fat Joe and Amerie	Diane Martel	Life	2005
"Qué Más Da"	Fat Joe and Debi Nova	Diane Martel	Life	2005
"It's Alright"	—N/a	Simon Brand	Life	2005
"Déjate Llevar"	—N/a	Simon Brand	Life	2005
"Non Siamo Soli"	Eros Ramazzotti	Wayne Isham	e²	2007
"No Estamos Solos"	Eros Ramazzotti	Wayne Isham	single release	2007
"The Best Thing About Me Is You"	—N/a	Carlos Pérez	Música + Alma + Sexo	2011
"Lo Mejor de Mi Vida Eres Tú"	—N/a	Carlos Pérez	Música + Alma + Sexo	2011
"Más"	—N/a	Simon Brand	Música + Alma + Sexo	2011
"Frío"	Wisin & Yandel	Carlos Pérez	Música + Alma + Sexo	2011
"Samba"	Claudia Leitte	Flavia Moraes	Música + Alma + Sexo	2011
"High Flying, Adored" (with Elena Roger)	—N/a	—N/a	Evita (New Broadway Cast Recording)	2012
"Buenos Aires"	Elena Roger	—N/a	Evita (New Broadway Cast Recording)	2012
"Come With Me"	—N/a	Carlos Pérez	single release	2013
"Come with Me" (Spanglish version)	—N/a	Carlos Pérez	single release	2013
"Adrenalina" (Spanglish version)	Jennifer Lopez and Wisin	Jessy Terrero	single release	2014
"Vida"	—N/a	Kátia Lund and Lívia Gama	One Love, One Rhythm – The 2014 FIFA World Cup Official Album	2014
"Adiós" (Spanish/French)	—N/a	Ethan Lader	A Quien Quiera Escuchar	2014
"Adiós" (English Version)	—N/a	Ethan Lader	A Quien Quiera Escuchar	2014
"Disparo al Corazón"	—N/a	Ethan Lader	A Quien Quiera Escuchar	2015
"La Mordidita"	Yotuel	Simón Brand	A Quien Quiera Escuchar	2015
"Perdóname"	—N/a	Carlos Pérez	A Quien Quiera Escuchar	2016
"Vente Pa' Ca"	Maluma	Jessy Terrero	single release	2016
"Fiebre"	Wisin & Yandel	Carlos Pérez	single release	2018
"Tiburones"	—N/a	Kacho López	Pausa	2020
"Falta Amor"	Sebastián Yatra	Carlos Pérez	single release	2020
"Tiburones" ( Remix)	Farruko	Carlos Pérez	single release	2020
"Recuerdo"	Carla Morrison	Carlos Pérez	Pausa	2020
"Canción Bonita"	Carlos Vives	Carlos Pérez	single release	2021
"Qué Rico Fuera"	Paloma Mami	Jessy Terrero	single release	2021
"Otra Noche en L.A."	—N/a	Daniela Vesco	Play	2022
"A Veces Bien y a Veces Mal"	Reik	Daniela Vesco	Play	2022
"Ácido Sabor"	—N/a	Carlos Pérez	Play	2022
"Fuego de Noche, Nieve de Día"	Christian Nodal	Carlos Pérez	single release	2023

=== As featured artist ===
List of music videos as featured artist, with directors, album title and showing year released
Title	Performer(s)	Director(s)	Album	Year
"Todo Es Vida"	Jessica Cristina	—N/a	Aprendiendo a Querer	1992
"Puedes Llegar"	Gloria Estefan, Julio Iglesias, Plácido Domingo, Jon Secada, Alejandro Fernández, Roberto Carlos, José Luis Rodríguez "El Puma", Patricia Sosa and Carlos Vives	—N/a	Voces Unidas	1997
"Ask for More" (Pepsi campaign)	Janet Jackson	—N/a	Ask for More	1999
"El Último Adiós (The Last Goodbye)"	Various artists	Emilio Estefan	single release	2001
"Más y Más"	Draco Rosa	Carlos Pérez	Vida	2013
"Adrenalina"	Wisin; Jennifer Lopez	Jessy Terrero	El Regreso Del Sobreviviente	2014
"Que Se Sienta el Deseo"	Wisin	Jessy Terrero	Los Vaqueros: La Trilogía	2015
"No Se Me Quita"	Maluma	Nuno Gomes	11:11	2019

=== Guest appearances ===
List of music videos as guest appearances, with directors, album title and showing year released
Title	Performer(s)	Director(s)	Album	Year
"Todo Mi Corazón"	Yuri	—N/a	Soy Libre	1991
"Antes Que El Mundo Se Acabe"	Residente	Residente	—N/a	2020
"Lullaby"	COASTCITY	—N/a	—N/a	2020
"Yo Visto Así"	Bad Bunny	Bad Bunny; Stillz	El Último Tour Del Mundo	2020

== Video releases ==
=== Albums ===
Year	Video details	Certifications
2001	La Historia: Released: February 27, 2001; Label: Columbia; Formats: CD/DVD, VCD, DVD; DVD edition	CAPIF certification: Platinum (8,000)
2006	MTV Unplugged: Released: November 7, 2006; Label: Sony Music; Formats: CD/DVD, DVD; Documentary and Live DVD	CAPIF certification: Platinum (8,000); RIAA certification: Gold (50,000)
2007	Ricky Martin Live: Black and White Tour: Released: November 6, 2007; Label: Sony Music; Formats: DVD, Blu-ray Disc, CD/DVD; Documentary and Live DVD	CAPIF certification: Gold (4,000); PROMUSICAE certification: Gold (10,000)
2008	17: Released: November 18, 2008; Label: Columbia and Sony BMG Norte; Formats: CD/DVD, DVD; DVD bonus material	

=== Other ===
Year	Video details	Certifications
1999	The Ricky Martin Video Collection: Released: October 5, 1999; Label: Columbia Records Music Video; Formats: VHS, VCD, DVD	Music Canada certification: 6× Platinum (60,000); BPI certification: Gold (25,000); RIAA certification: Platinum (100,000)
1999	One Night Only: Released: December 14, 1999; Label: Columbia Records Music Video; Formats: VHS, VCD, DVD	RIAA certification: Platinum (100,000)
2001	Europa: European Tour: Released: July 3, 2001; Label: N/A; Formats: DVD	

== Filmography ==
=== Television ===
Year	Title	Role	Notes
1985	The Love Boat	Ricky	
1987	Por siempre amigos (Argentine TV series)	Ricky	
1991	Alcanzar una estrella II	Pablo Loredo	
1993	Getting By	Martin	Guest Star
1994-95	General Hospital	Miguel Morez	
1996	Barefoot in Paradise	Sandoval	
1999	Saturday Night Live	Musical Guest	
2000	Saturday Night Live	Musical Guest	
2006	Sos mi vida	Himself	
2011	American Dad!	himself	Episode: "The Worst Stan" (uncredited)
2012	Glee	David Martínez	Episode: "The Spanish Teacher"
2013	The Voice Australia	Coach	Season 2
2014	Dancing with the Stars	Judge	
2014	The Voice Australia	Coach	Season 3
2014	La Voz... México	Coach	
2014	The Voice Arabia	Guest Judge	
2014	The Voice Kids Arabia	Guest Judge	
2015	The Voice Australia	Coach	Season 4
2015	La Banda	Judge and executive producer	
2015	Nuestra Belleza Latina	Guest	Season 9, 2 Episodes
2015	Britain's Got Talent	Guest Performer	Series 9
2017	Lip Sync Battle	Himself	winner vs. Kate Upton
2018	The Assassination of Gianni Versace: American Crime Story	Antonio D'Amico	5 Episodes
2019	Amici di Maria De Filippi	Coach	Season 18
2019	20th Annual Latin Grammy Awards	Host	Television special
2020	RuPaul's Drag Race All Stars	Guest Judge	Season 5, Episode 1
2020	Essential Heroes: A Momento Latino	Host	Television special
2021	Behind the Music	Himself	Documentary
2024	Palm Royale	Robert Diaz	10 episodes

=== Film ===
Year	Title	Role	Notes
1992	Más que alcanzar una estrella	Enrique	
1997	Hercules	Hercules	Voice role (Latin American dub)
1999	Idle Hands	Man in Car Park	
2015	Minions	Herb Overkill	Voice role (Latin American dub)
2020	Jingle Jangle: A Christmas Journey	Don Juan Diego	Voice role

== Commercials ==
Company	Year	Promoting	Title	Theme song(s)	Region
Pepsi-Cola	—N/a	Soft drink beverage	—N/a	—N/a	International
Nescafé Clasico	—N/a	Coffee drink beverage	¡Vive la Vida Bold!	—N/a	—N/a
Nescafé Clasico	2015	Coffee drink beverage	Campaña Ama Los Lunes		
Nescafé Clasico	2016	Coffee drink beverage	Make the Concert Happen	—N/a	Latin America
Nescafé Clasico	2016	Coffee drink beverage	Rompe La Rutina	—N/a	Latin America
epura	2018	Bottled water	—N/a	—N/a	Mexico
epura	2019	Bottled water	—N/a	—N/a	Mexico
Nescafé Clasico	2019	Coffee drink beverage	—N/a	—N/a	Latin America
The Latin Recording Academy	2019	20th Annual Latin Grammy Awards	—N/a	—N/a	United States
epura	2020	Bottled water	—N/a	—N/a	Mexico
Postobón Acqua	2020	Soft drink beverage	—N/a	—N/a	Colombia
Postobón Acqua	2020	Soft drink beverage	—N/a	—N/a	Colombia
epura	2020	Bottled water	—N/a	—N/a	Mexico

== See also ==
- Ricky Martin albums discography
- Ricky Martin singles discography
