= Ricky Martin albums discography =

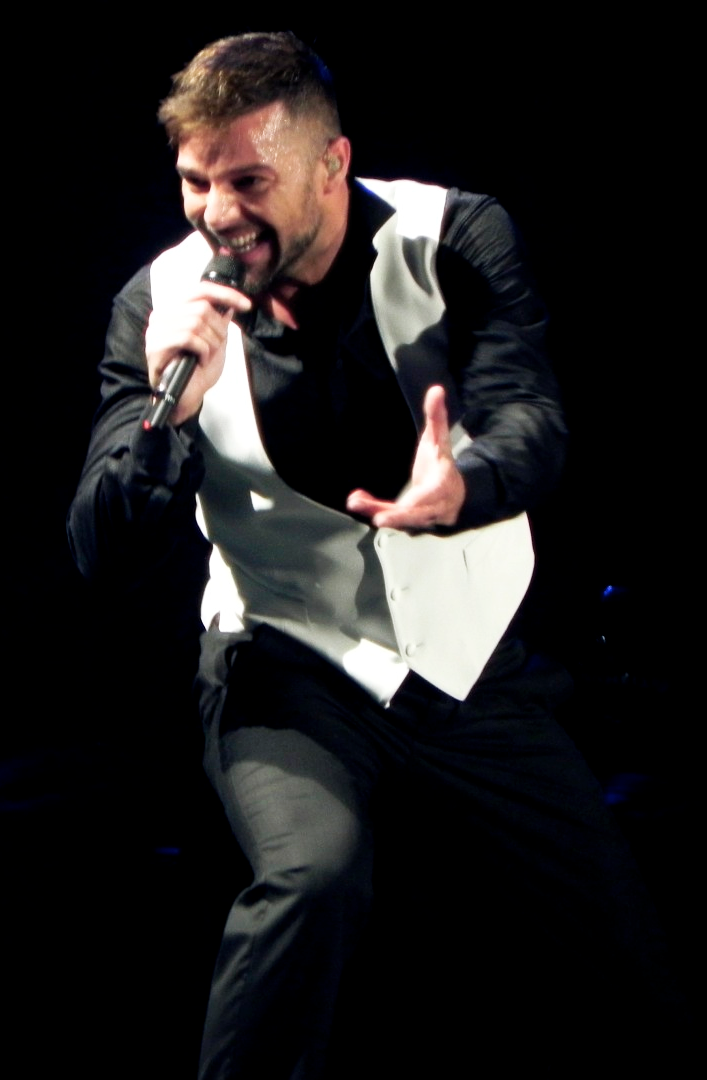
- Martin performing during the Música + Alma + Sexo World Tour, April 2011
- Studio albums: 10
- Soundtrack albums: 1
- Live albums: 2
- Compilation albums: 7
- Box sets: 4

Puerto Rican recording artist Ricky Martin has released ten studio albums, seven compilation albums, two live albums, one soundtrack album and four box sets. Martin has sold over 70 million records, making him one of the best-selling Latin music artists of all time. His self-titled debut studio album was released in November 1991 by Sony Discos. Two years later, Columbia Records released Martin's second studio album, Me Amaras. Despite both albums failing to achieve a significant commercial success, they pushed Martin towards superstar status in many Latin American countries. His third studio album, A Medio Vivir, was released in September 1995 by Sony Latin. The album features a "harder rock edge style" than his previous efforts, while being mixed with Latin references such as flamenco and cumbia. A Medio Vivir charted in several countries and peaked at number seven in Spain and number 11 on the US Latin Albums chart.

In 1998, Martin released his fourth studio album, Vuelve, which became his first record to chart on the US Billboard 200 chart, peaking at number 40; it became the highest-selling Latin album of 1999 and is the tenth bestselling Latin album of all time in the country as of October 2017. Additionally, it peaked at number one on the US Latin Albums chart and in Spain, where it was certified six-times platinum by Promusicae. He released his fifth studio and second eponymous album in 1999; it was a commercial success reaching number one in Australia, Finland, Spain and in the United States, and number two in the United Kingdom. It was certified seven-times platinum by the Recording Industry Association of America (RIAA), denoting shipments of over seven million copies in the United States. As of April 2011, Ricky Martin has sold over 15 million copies worldwide, making it his best selling-album.

Martin released his sixth studio album, Sound Loaded, in 2000. The album peaked in the top five in Australia, Spain, Sweden, Switzerland and the United States, where it was certified double platinum for shipments of over two million units. In 2001, Martin released two greatest hit albums: La Historia and The Best of Ricky Martin. La Historia compiled his biggest Spanish-language hits and charted at number 83 on the US Billboard 200 and number one on the US Latin Albums chart, while The Best of Ricky Martin which consisted of his biggest English-language hits, peaked at number 23 in Australia and 17 in Finland. In 2003, the singer released his seventh studio album, Almas del Silencio. It peaked at number one on the US Latin Albums chart and number 12 on the US Billboard 200.

Martin's eight studio album, Life, was released in October 2005 to moderate success, peaking at number six in the United States and number 40 in the United Kingdom. In 2006, Martin's first live album, MTV Unplugged, was released by Sony Music Norte. It peaked at number 38 on the US Billboard 200 and number one on the US Latin Albums chart. Martin's ninth studio album, Música + Alma + Sexo was released by Sony Music Latin in January 2011. It peaked at number three in the United States and received a platinum certification in the Latin field by the RIAA, indicating shipments of over 100,000 copies in the country. In April 2013, he released his sixth compilation album, Greatest Hits: Souvenir Edition, exclusively in Australia, where it peaked at number two and was certified gold by the Australian Recording Industry Association (ARIA). A Quien Quiera Escuchar, Martin's tenth studio album, was released in February 2015; it debuted at number 20 on the US Billboard 200 chart and number one on the US Top Latin Albums chart.

== Studio albums ==
List of studio albums, with selected chart positions and certifications
Title	Album details	Peak chart positions										Sales	Certifications
Title	Album details	US	US Latin	AUS	FIN	GER	ITA	SPA	SWE	SWI	UK	Sales	Certifications
Ricky Martin	Released: November 26, 1991 (US); Label: Sony Discos; Formats: CD, cassette	—	— (Note: Ricky Martin was released before the Top Latin Albums chart was established. It peaked at number five on Latin Pop Albums.)	—	—	—	—	—	—	—	—	WW: 500,000	
Me Amaras	Released: April 16, 1993; Label: Sony Discos; Formats: CD, cassette, LP	—	— (Note: Me Amaras was released before the Top Latin Albums chart was established. It peaked at number twenty-two on Latin Pop Albums.)	—	—	—	—	—	—	—	—	WW: 700,000	
A Medio Vivir	Released: September 12, 1995 (US); Label: Sony Discos; Formats: CD, cassette	—	11	—	10	20	25	7	51	12	—	WW: 3,000,000; US: 287,000	IFPI FIN: Gold; IFPI SWI: Gold; Promusicae: 4× Platinum; RIAA: Gold
Vuelve	Released: February 10, 1998 (US); Label: Sony Discos; Formats: CD, cassette	40	1	2	7	15	4	1	2	4	—	WW: 6,000,000; US: 888,000	ARIA: 2× Platinum; IFPI FIN: Gold; IFPI SWI: Platinum; Promusicae: 6× Platinum; RIAA: Platinum
Ricky Martin	Released: May 1, 1999 (US); Label: Columbia; Formats: CD, cassette	1	—	1	1	2	5	1	3	2	2	WW: 15,000,000; US: 7,000,000	ARIA: 3× Platinum; BPI: Platinum; BVMI: Gold; IFPI FIN: Gold; IFPI SWI: Platinum; Promusicae: 3× Platinum; RIAA: 7× Platinum
Sound Loaded	Released: November 14, 2000 (US); Label: Columbia; Formats: CD, cassette	4	—	3	11	17	10	3	3	4	14	WW: 6,000,000; US: 1,700,000	ARIA: 2× Platinum; BPI: Platinum; BVMI: Gold; IFPI FIN: Gold; IFPI SWI: Gold; Promusicae: 2× Platinum; RIAA: 2× Platinum
Almas Del Silencio	Released: May 20, 2003 (US); Label: Sony Discos; Formats: CD, cassette	12	1	21	9	17	3	2	17	2	—	WW: 2,000,000; US: 261,000	IFPI SWI: Gold; Promusicae: Platinum; RIAA: 4× Platinum (Latin)
Life	Released: October 11, 2005 (US); Label: Columbia; Formats: CD, digital download	6	—	44	34	57	14	8	34	17	40	WW: 694,000; US: 274,000	
Música + Alma + Sexo	Released: January 31, 2011 (US); Label: Sony Music Latin; Formats: CD, digital download	3	1	—	—	—	52	3	—	49	—	WW: 300,000; US: 112,000	RIAA: Platinum (Latin)
A Quien Quiera Escuchar	Released: February 10, 2015; Label: Sony Latin; Formats: CD, digital download	20	1	76	—	—	65	3	—	49	—		RIAA: Platinum (Latin)
"—" denotes a recording that did not chart or was not released in that territory.

== Live albums ==
List of compilation albums, with selected chart positions and certifications
Title	Album details	Peak chart positions				Sales	Certifications
Title	Album details	US	US Latin	ITA	SPA	Sales	Certifications
MTV Unplugged	Released: November 21, 2006 (US); Label: Sony BMG Norte; Formats: CD, DVD, digital download	38	1	74	6	US: 197,000	Promusicae: Gold; RIAA: 2× Platinum (Latin)
Ricky Martin... Live Black & White Tour	Released: November 1, 2007 (US); Label: Sony BMG Norte; Formats: Blu-ray, CD, DVD, digital download	—	12	84	2 (Note: position on the Music DVD Chart)		Promusicae: Gold
"—" denotes a recording that did not chart or was not released in that territory.

== Compilation albums ==
List of compilation albums, with selected chart positions and certifications
Title	Album details	Peak chart positions										Sales	Certifications
Title	Album details	US	US Latin	AUS	FIN	GER	ITA	SPA	SWE	SWI	UK	Sales	Certifications
La Historia	Released: February 27, 2001 (US); Label: Sony Discos; Formats: CD, cassette, DVD	83	1	—	—	—	16	13	1	23	—	US: 220,000	RIAA: 4× Platinum (Latin); Promusicae: Gold
The Best of Ricky Martin	Released: November 19, 2001 (SPA); Label: Columbia; Formats: CD, cassette	—	—	25	17	29	12	—	—	26	42	WW: 1,000,000	ARIA: Platinum; BPI: Gold; IFPI FIN: Gold
17	Released: November 18, 2008 (US); Label: Norte; Formats: CD, cassette, DVD	—	21	—	—	—	—	16	—	—	—		
Greatest Hits	Released: July 11, 2011 (UK); Label: Sony; Formats: CD, digital download	—	—	—	—	—	—	—	—	—	24		
Playlist: The Very Best of Ricky Martin	Released: October 9, 2012 (US); Label: Columbia, Legacy; Formats: CD, digital download	—	—	—	—	—	—	—	—	—	—		
Greatest Hits: Souvenir Edition	Released: April 1, 2013 (AUS); Label: Sony; Formats: CD, digital download	—	—	2	—	—	—	—	—	—	—		ARIA: Gold
Personalidad	Released: June 16, 2015 (MEX); Label: Sony; Formats: CD+DVD, digital download	—	—	—	—	—	—	—	—	—	—		
Esencial	Released: July 6, 2018 (SPA); Label: Sony; Formats: CD, digital download	—	—	—	—	—	—	62	—	—	—		
"—" denotes a recording that did not chart or was not released in that territory.

== Soundtracks ==
List of soundtracks
Title	Album details	Peak chart positions
Title	Album details	US
Evita: New Broadway Cast Recording	Released: June 22, 2012 (US); Label: Sony Music Entertainment; Format: CD, digital download	156

== Extended plays ==
Title	Details	Peak chart positions	
Title	Details	US Latin Pop	SPA
Pausa	Released: May 28, 2020; Format: Digital download, streaming; Label: Sony Music Latin	8	79
Play	Released: July 13, 2022; Format: Digital download, streaming; Label: Sony Music Latin	—	—
"—" denotes releases that did not chart or were not released in that territory.

== Box sets ==
List of box sets
Title	Album details
Ricky Martin/Me Amaras/A Medio Vivir	Released: September 17, 2001; Label: Columbia; Format: CD
Ricky Martin/Vuelve	Released: April 10, 2006; Label: Sony Music; Format: CD
Dos Clásicos	Released: May 8, 2012; Label: Sony Music; Format: CD
Clásicos	Released: December 3, 2013 (US); Label: Sony Music Latin; Format: CD

== See also ==
- List of best-selling Latin music artists
- Ricky Martin singles discography
