= One Night Only with Ricky Martin =

2005–06 concert tour by Ricky Martin

- World tour by Ricky Martin
- Location: North America; South America; Europe; Africa; Asia
- Associated album: Life
- Start date: November 13, 2005
- End date: June 7, 2006
- Legs: 4
- No. of shows: 7 in South America; 24 in North America; 3 in Asia; 18 in Europe; 1 in Africa; 53 total

Ricky Martin concert chronology
- Livin' la Vida Loca Tour (1999–2000); One Night Only with Ricky Martin (2005–06); Black and White Tour (2007)

One Night Only with Ricky Martin (also known as Una Noche con Ricky Martin) was a worldwide concert tour by Puerto Rican singer Ricky Martin, in support of his 2005 album Life. The tour visited the Americas, Europe, Asia and Africa.

== Background ==
Ricky Martin kicked off his tour on November 15, 2005, in Mexico. The concerts took him to ten countries in a four-week period, including Brazil and Argentina.

The tour moved to the United States in early 2006. It started on January 15, 2006, in El Paso, Texas and visited many prestigious venues. Martin played a total of 20 sold-out concerts in 18 US cities, ending in February 2006 with two shows in his native land of Puerto Rico.

The European leg started on April 21, 2006, in Manchester, England, and included stops in London, Italy, Finland, and France among others. The tour ended in the Middle East with concerts in Lebanon, Egypt and Israel. Shows in Italy and Finland sold-out in two hours. In addition, Martin performed at the World Cup Fan Party in Berlin by the Brandenburg Gate on June 7, 2006.

MTV aired MTV Diary: Ricky Martin in November 2006, showcasing scenes from the tour, on the road and onstage.

== Set list ==
1. "Til I Get to You"
2. "Por Arriba, Por Abajo"
3. "I Don't Care"
4. "Bella"
5. "Livin' la Vida Loca"
6. "Corazonado"
7. "Jaleo"
8. "Fuego Contra Fuego"
9. "Tal Vez"
10. "Lola, Lola"
11. "Perdido Sin Tí"
12. "El Amor de Mi Vida"
13. "Te Extraño, Te Olvido, Te Amo"
14. "It's Alright"
15. "La Bomba"
16. "María"
17. "La Copa de la Vida"
18. "Vuelve"
19. "Drop It on Me"

== Tour dates ==
Date	City	Country	Venue
South America
November 13, 2005^{[A]}	Caracas	Venezuela	Estadio Olímpico de la UCV
North America
November 15, 2005	Mexico City	Mexico	National Auditorium
November 17, 2005	Monterrey	Mexico	Monterrey Arena
November 21, 2005	San Salvador	El Salvador	Anfiteatro de la Feria Internacional
November 23, 2005	Panama City	Panama	Atlapa Convention Centre
South America
November 25, 2005	Bogotá	Colombia	Gran Salón Corferias
November 27, 2005	Quito	Ecuador	Ágora de la Casa de la Cultura
November 29, 2005	Santiago	Chile	Espacio Riesco
December 1, 2005	São Paulo	Brazil	Credicard Hall
December 6, 2005	Buenos Aires	Argentina	Luna Park
December 8, 2005	Punta del Este	Uruguay	Uruguay Hotel Conrad Grounds
North America
January 15, 2006	El Paso	United States	Chavez Theatre
January 17, 2006	Hidalgo	United States	Dodge Arena
January 18, 2006	Houston	United States	Verizon Wireless Theater
January 19, 2006	Grand Prairie	United States	Nokia Live at Grand Prairie
January 23, 2006	Phoenix	United States	Dodge Theatre
January 24, 2006	Los Angeles	United States	Pantages Theatre
January 25, 2006	San Diego	United States	Copley Symphony Hall
January 27, 2006	Las Vegas	United States	Aladdin Theatre for the Performing Arts
January 28, 2006	Reno	United States	Hilton Theater
January 29, 2006	Oakland	United States	Paramount Theatre
February 2, 2006	Chicago	United States	Chicago Theatre
February 6, 2006	New York City	United States	Radio City Music Hall
February 8, 2006	Boston	United States	Boston Opera House
February 9, 2006	Washington, D.C.	United States	DAR Constitution Hall
February 10, 2006	Atlantic City	United States	Borgata Events Center
February 12, 2006	Atlanta	United States	The Tabernacle
February 14, 2006	Miami	United States	James L. Knight Center
February 15, 2006	Orlando	United States	Bob Carr Performing Arts Centre
February 18, 2006	San Juan	Puerto Rico	José Miguel Agrelot Coliseum
February 19, 2006	San Juan	Puerto Rico	José Miguel Agrelot Coliseum
Asia
February 25, 2006^{[B]}	Agra	India	Taj Mahal Garden
Europe
April 21, 2006	Manchester	England	Carling Apollo Manchester
April 22, 2006	London	England	Carling Apollo Hammersmith
April 24, 2006	Amsterdam	Netherlands	Heineken Music Hall
April 25, 2006	Düsseldorf	Germany	Philips Halle
April 29, 2006	Stuttgart	Germany	Hanns-Martin-Schleyer-Halle
May 1, 2006	Copenhagen	Denmark	K.B. Hallen
May 3, 2006	Stockholm	Sweden	Annexet
May 4, 2006	Paris	France	Zénith de Paris
May 6, 2006	Milan	Italy	DatchForum di Assago
May 8, 2006	Marseille	France	Le Dôme de Marseille
May 9, 2006	Badalona	Spain	Palau Municipal d'Esports de Badalona
May 11, 2006	Valencia	Spain	Palacio Velódromo Luis Puig
May 12, 2006	Murcia	Spain	Plaza de Toros de Murcia
May 14, 2006	Madrid	Spain	Madrid Arena
May 18, 2006	Moscow	Russia	Olympic Stadium
May 20, 2006	Saint Petersburg	Russia	Ice Palace
May 22, 2006	Helsinki	Finland	Hartwall Arena
Asia
May 27, 2006^{[C]}	Beirut	Lebanon	BIEL Seafront Hall
Africa
May 29, 2006	Cairo	Egypt	Egyptian Media Production City
Asia
June 3, 2006	Tel Aviv	Israel	Nokia Arena
Europe
June 7, 2006^{[D]}	Berlin	Germany	Brandenburg Gate

Festivals and other miscellaneous performances
^{A} Caracas Pop Festival
^{A} 8th Wonder of the World Concert Series
^{C} Beiteddine Festival
^{D} Fan Fest Berlin

Cancellations and rescheduled shows

May 31, 2006	Athens, Greece	Karaiskakis Stadium	Cancelled

=== Box office score data ===
Venue	City	Tickets sold / available	Gross sales
Dodge Arena	Hidalgo	4,794 / 4,794 (100%)	$330,092
NokiaLive at Grand Prairie	Grand Prairie	3,613 / 3,613 (100%)	$214,974
Paramount Theatre	Oakland	2,983 / 3,040 (98%)	$221,617
Chicago Theatre	Chicago	3,376 / 3,376 (100%)	$268,085
James L. Knight Center	Miami	4,699 / 4,699 (100%)	$337,239
José Miguel Agrelot Coliseum	San Juan	28,209 / 28,419 (99%)	$1,845,295
Total		47,674 / 47,941 (99%)	$3,217,302
