= Perdido Sin Ti =

1998 single by Ricky Martin

- European 1998 single

Single by Ricky Martin

from the album Vuelve
- Language: Spanish
- B-side: "Entre el Amor y los Halagos"; "Vuelo"; "Susana"
- Released: August 18, 1998
- Recorded: 1997
- Length: 4:10
- Label: Columbia
- Songwriters: K.C. Porter; Robi Rosa; Luis Gómez-Escolar
- Producers: Porter; Rosa

Ricky Martin singles chronology
"La Bomba" (1998)	"Perdido Sin Ti" (1998)	"Por Arriba, Por Abajo" (1998)

Music video
- "Perdido Sin Ti" on Facebook Watch

Audio sample
- file; help

"Perdido Sin Ti" (transl. "Lost without You") is a song recorded by Puerto Rican singer Ricky Martin for his fourth studio album, Vuelve (1998). The song was written by K.C. Porter, Robi Rosa, and Luis Gómez-Escolar, while the production was handled by Porter and Rosa. It was released by Columbia Records as the fourth single from the album on August 18, 1998. A heart-wrenching, slow ballad, its protagonist is nostalgia. The song received positive reviews from music critics, who complimented its "sweetness" and "dreamy hook".

"Perdido Sin Ti" was acknowledged as an award-winning song at the 2000 BMI Latin Awards. The song reached number one on Billboard's Hot Latin Songs and Latin Pop Airplay charts in the United States, as well as number three in both Panama and Puerto Rico. The accompanying music video was directed by Gustavo Garzón and premiered at the Wolfsonian Museum in October 1998. The track was included on the set lists for Martin's the One Night Only with Ricky Martin tour and the Movimiento Tour.

== Background and composition ==
In 1995, Ricky Martin released his third studio album, A Medio Vivir. On it, he shifted from his traditional ballad-style compositions to a riskier fusion of music focused on traditional Latin sounds, epitomized by the song "María". Taken aback by the starkly different musical style, his record label executives felt the song would ruin Martin's career. Despite this, "María" was chosen as the album's second single and became a breakthrough hit, reaching number one in France, Spain, Germany, Belgium, Holland, Switzerland, Finland, Italy, Turkey, and the whole of South America. As of 2014, A Medio Vivir had sold over three million copies worldwide. While on tour in 1997, Martin returned to the studio and began recording material for his fourth studio album. He said the experience of touring and recording at the same time was "brutal and incredibly intense". On December 7, 1997, Martin confirmed he was completing his next project and that the album would be released in February of the following year. He worked on the album with producers K.C. Porter and Robi Rosa, and recorded it in studios across the United States, Puerto Rico, and Spain.

The album's title, Vuelve, was announced on January 25, 1998. In an interview with CNN en Español, he emphasized the album was going to "reaffirm the internationalization of my career and I know that it will help me a lot to destroy the stereotypes that may exist with my culture". The album consisting mainly of "red-hot" Latin dance numbers and "melodramatic" pop ballads. "Perdido Sin Ti" was written by Porter, Rosa, and Luis Gómez Escolar, and runs for a total of four minutes and ten seconds. An "aching, slower-placed" ballad, in which nostalgia is the protagonist. In the lyrics, he cites "No me dejes solo quédate en mi casa, sin ti me falta todo, sin ti no queda nada" ("Don't leave alone, stay in my house, I'd lack everything without you, nothing remains you").

== Release and promotion ==
A screenshot from the music video, depicting Martin and a girl, who personifies an angel.

"Perdido Sin Ti" was released on August 18, 1998, as the album's fourth single. The song was also later added to Martin's compilation albums La Historia (2001), Personalidad (2015), and Esencial (2018). The track was included as the ninth track on Martin's fourth studio album, Vuelve, released February 12, 1998. The European maxi-single for "Perdido Sin Ti" includes "Entre el Amor y los Halagos" taken from Martin's second studio album, Me Amaras (1993), as well as "Vuelo" and "Susana" from his debut studio album, Ricky Martin (1991). The accompanying music video was directed by Argentine director Gustavo Garzón, and premiered in October 1998 at the Wolfsonian Museum in Miami. Martin uploaded the visual on Facebook Watch on October 15, 2019. "Perdido Sin Ti" was included as part of the setlists for the One Night Only with Ricky Martin tour and the Movimiento Tour. A live version of "Perdido Sin Ti" was recorded and taped as part of his MTV Unplugged set in Miami, Florida on August 17, 2006.

== Reception ==
"Perdido Sin Ti" was met with positive reviews from music critics. John Lannert of Billboard magazine mentioned the track as one of the album's potential hits. Writing for Vista magazine, Carmen Teresa Roiz remarked that the song, along with "Casi un Bolero" and "Corazonado, "reflects the most intimate part of the interpreter". The Newsday critic Richard Torres praised the track's "sweetness". The Dallas Morning News reviewer Mario Tarradell labeled it "a bedroom staple with a dreamy hook and a simmering feel". An author of Crónica TV named "Perdido Sin Ti" among Martin's "most important songs" and Melissa Martinez from the El Paso Times named it as one of her favorites. In 2015, Univision staff ranked the track as Martin's seventh-best ballad. The following year, Marco Salazar Nuñez from E! Online placed it on an unranked list of "9 Ricky Martin songs perfect to liven up your own wedding", stating: "A wedding is not a wedding without the romantic dance." It was acknowledged as an award-winning song at the 2000 BMI Latin Awards.

The track peaked at number three in both Panama and Puerto Rico. In the United States, "Perdido Sin Ti" debuted at number 28 on the Billboard Hot Latin Songs on the week of September 5, 1998. The single reached on top of the chart two weeks later, succeeding "Tu Sonrisa" by Elvis Crespo, becoming Martin's second number one on the chart. It was replaced by Carlos Ponce's song "Decir Adios" the following week. The track also reached the top of the Latin Pop Airplay subchart, displacing Martin's own "Vuelve" making him the first artist on the chart's history to replace himself; it spent a total of two weeks in this position.

== Formats and track listings ==
European CD single

1. "Perdido Sin Ti" – 4:10
2. "Entre el Amor y los Halagos" – 4:20

European CD maxi-single

1. "Perdido Sin Ti" (Radio Edit) – 4:03
2. "Entre el Amor y los Halagos" – 4:20
3. "Vuelo" – 3:58
4. "Susana" – 4:54

Mexican promotional CD single

1. "Perdido Sin Ti" – 4:10

== Credits and personnel ==
Credits are adapted from Tidal.

- Ricky Martin – vocal, associated performer
- K.C. Porter – composer, lyricist, producer, piano
- Robi Rosa – composer, lyricist, producer, background vocal, recording engineer
- Luis Gómez-Escolar – composer, lyricist
- David Campbell – arranger
- Jeff Shannon – assistant engineer
- Jorge M. Jaramillo – assistant engineer
- Juan Rosario – assistant engineer
- Jules Condar – assistant engineer, recording engineer
- Kieran Murray – assistant engineer
- Rafa Sardina – assistant engineer
- Robert Valdez – assistant engineer
- Scott Kieklak – assistant engineer
- Teresa Cassin – assistant engineer
- Paul Gordon – assistant engineer
- Bill Smith – assistant engineer
- Luis Villanueva – assistant engineer
- Alberto Pino – assistant engineer
- Dave Dominguez – assistant engineer
- Francisco "Panchoî" – assistant engineer
- Tomaselli – assistant engineer
- Gene Lo – assistant engineer
- Iris Salazar – assistant engineer
- Julia Waters – background vocal
- Phil Perry – background vocal
- Ricky Nelson – background vocal
- John West – background vocal
- Darryl Phinnessee – background vocal
- Josie Aiello – background vocal
- Oren Waters – background vocal
- Carmen Twillie – background vocal
- Stefanie Spruill – background vocal
- James Gilstrap – background vocal
- Kristle Murden – background vocal
- Marlena Jeter – background vocal
- Bunny Hill – background vocal
- GB Dorsey – background vocal
- Jackeline Simley – background vocal
- Katrina Harper – background vocal
- Martonette Jenkins – background vocal
- Maxine Jeter – background vocal
- Phillip Ingram – background vocal
- Reggie Hamilton – bass
- Curt Bisquera – drums
- Michael Landau – electric guitar
- Leo Herrera – mixing engineer
- Bobby Rothstein – mixing engineer
- Chris Brooke – mixing engineer
- Jun Murakawa – mixing engineer
- Luis Quiñe – mixing engineer
- Mike Ainsworth – mixing engineer
- Tony Pelusso – mixing engineer
- Mike Aarvold – mixing engineer
- Travis Smith – mixing engineer
- Chris Carroll – mixing engineer
- Todd Keller – mixing engineer
- Randy Waldman – piano
- John Beasley – piano
- Esteban Villanueva – project coordintor, recording engineer
- Iris Aponte – project coordintor
- Sarah Wykes – project coordintor
- Steve Churchyard – recording engineer
- John Lowson – recording engineer
- Ted Stein – recording engineer
- Robert Fernandez – recording engineer
- Brian Jenkins – recording engineer
- Doc Wiley – recording engineer
- Benny Faccone – recording engineer
- Carlos Nieto – recording engineer
- Charles Dye – recording engineer
- Danny Vicari – recording engineer
- Femio Hernandez – recording engineer
- Héctor Iván Rosa – recording engineer
- Jeff Poe – recording engineer
- Jesus "Chuy" Flores – recording engineer
- John Karpowich – recording engineer
- Karl Cameron – recording engineer
- Keith Rose – recording engineer
- Luis Fernando Soria – recording engineer
- Matt Ross Hyde – recording engineer
- Peter McCabe – recording engineer
- Rik Pekkonen – recording engineer

== Charts ==
Chart performance for "Perdido Sin Ti"
Chart (1998)	Peak position
Finland (Finnish Top 50 Hits)	27
Finland (Finnish Airplay Chart)	10
Panama (Notimex)	3
Puerto Rico (Notimex)	3
Spain (Top 40 Radio)	18
US Hot Latin Songs (Billboard)	1
US Latin Pop Airplay (Billboard)	1
US Tropical Airplay (Billboard)	10

== Release history ==
Release dates and formats for "Perdido Sin Ti"
Region	Date	Format(s)	Label	Ref.
Europe	August 18, 1998	CD maxi-single	Columbia Records	

== See also ==
- List of number-one Billboard Hot Latin Tracks of 1998
- List of Billboard Latin Pop Airplay number ones of 1998
