= Esencial (Ricky Martin album) =

Greatest hits album by Ricky Martin

Greatest hits album by Ricky Martin
- Released: July 6, 2018
- Recorded: 1995–2016
- Genre: Pop
- Label: Legacy
- Producer: Various

Ricky Martin chronology
A Quien Quiera Escuchar (2015)	Esencial (2018)	Pausa (2020)

Esencial is a greatest hits album by Puerto Rican singer Ricky Martin, released by Legacy Recordings on July 6, 2018. It was issued in Spain and Portugal to coincide with Martin's tour in August and September 2018. The two-CD set with 30 songs includes mostly Martin's Spanish-language hits, uptempo tracks on the first disc and ballads on the second.

== Background ==
Between August 14, 2018, and September 1, 2018, Martin toured Spain. Later, between September 4, 2018, and September 9, 2018, he also gave concerts in Hungary, Poland and Czech Republic. To coincide with Martin's tour, Sony Music's Legacy Recordings released Esencial with 30 of his hits, including the latest "Vente Pa' Ca" featuring Maluma and "La Mordidita" featuring Yotuel. Classics like "María", "La Copa de la Vida" and "Livin' la Vida Loca" were also included.

== Track listing ==
Disc one
No.	Title	Album	Length
1.	"Vente Pa' Ca" (featuring Maluma)	Non-album single	4:19
2.	"La Mordidita" (featuring Yotuel)	A Quien Quiera Escuchar	3:29
3.	"Jaleo" (Spanish Version)	Almas del Silencio	3:41
4.	"María" (Spanglish Radio Edit)	A Medio Vivir	3:59
5.	"La Copa de la Vida" (Spanglish Radio Edit)	Vuelve	4:37
6.	"Pégate" (Radio Edit)	MTV Unplugged	3:10
7.	"La Bomba"	Vuelve	4:34
8.	"Lola, Lola"	Vuelve	4:45
9.	"Livin' la Vida Loca" (Spanish Version)	Ricky Martin	4:02
10.	"Shake Your Bon-Bon"	Ricky Martin	3:11
11.	"She Bangs" (Spanish Version)	Sound Loaded	4:34
12.	"Dame Más"	Sound Loaded	3:52
13.	"Adiós"	A Quien Quiera Escuchar	3:59
14.	"Déjate Llevar"	Life	3:33
15.	"Más"	Música + Alma + Sexo	4:10

Disc two
No.	Title	Album	Length
1.	"Lo Mejor de Mi Vida Eres Tú" (featuring Natalia Jiménez)	Música + Alma + Sexo	3:36
2.	"Tu Recuerdo" (featuring La Mari and Tommy Torres)	MTV Unplugged	4:07
3.	"Y Todo Queda en Nada"	Almas del Silencio	4:36
4.	"Tal Vez"	Almas del Silencio	4:38
5.	"Bella"	Ricky Martin	4:54
6.	"No Importa la Distancia" (from Hercules)	Vuelve	4:51
7.	"Asignatura Pendiente"	Almas del Silencio	3:55
8.	"Vuelve"	Vuelve	5:07
9.	"Somos la Semilla"	A Medio Vivir	3:52
10.	"Perdido Sin Ti"	Vuelve	4:10
11.	"Te Extraño, Te Olvido, Te Amo"	A Medio Vivir	4:38
12.	"A Medio Vivir"	A Medio Vivir	4:41
13.	"Fuego de Noche, Nieve de Día"	A Medio Vivir	5:34
14.	"El Amor de Mi Vida"	Ricky Martin (1991)	3:56
15.	"Fuego Contra Fuego"	Ricky Martin (1991)	4:28

== Charts ==
Chart (2018)	Peak position
Portuguese Albums (AFP)	23
Spanish Albums (PROMUSICAE)	62

== Release history ==
Region	Date	Label	Format	Catalog
Spain	July 6, 2018	Legacy	CD	19075853592
