= Me Amarás =

Me Amarás may refer to:

- Me Amaras (album), a 1993 album by Ricky Martin
- "Me Amaras" (song), a 1993 single by Ricky Martin
