= Ricky Martin... Live Black & White Tour =

Ricky Martin Live: Black and White Tour

Live album by Ricky Martin
- Released: November 5, 2007
- Recorded: August 10–11, 2007 in Puerto Rico
- Genre: Latin; pop rock; Latin pop; dance-pop
- Length: 54:49 (CD)
- Label: Sony BMG Norte
- Producer: David Cabrera

Ricky Martin chronology
MTV Unplugged (2006)	Ricky Martin Live: Black and White Tour (2007)	17 (2008)

Ricky Martin video chronology
MTV Unplugged (2006)	Ricky Martin Live: Black and White Tour (2007)	17 (2008)

Singles from Ricky Martin Live: Black and White Tour
- 1. "Somos la Semilla" Released: November 2007

Ricky Martin Live Black and White Tour is the second live album by Ricky Martin, released by Sony BMG Norte. It was recorded during his performances at the José Miguel Agrelot Coliseum in Puerto Rico on August 10 and 11, 2007 as a part of his worldwide Black and White Tour.

Like his previous album, MTV Unplugged this album was released in a CD/DVD format, DVD and CD. It's also Martin's first ever Blu-ray Disc release.

The song "Somos la Semilla", first included on A Medio Vivir, promoted the album.

== Commercial performance ==
Ricky Martin Live: Black and White Tour peaked inside top ten on the Spanish DVD chart and Argentine Albums chart and was certified Gold in both countries. In the United States, it reached number twelve on the Billboard Top Latin Album chart. In Mexico, the album peaked at number twenty-four and was certified Gold.

== Track listing ==
CD
No.	Title	Writer(s)	Producer(s)	Length
1.	"Intro/Pégate/Raza de Mil Colores/Por Arriba, Por Abajo"	Ricky Martin; Roy Tavaré; Tommy Torres; Daniel López; Yasmil Marrufo; Juan Vicente Zambrano; Robi Rosa; Luis Gómez-Escolar; César Lemos; Karla Aponte	David Cabrera	5:39
2.	"I Don't Care/María Mix"	Sean Garrett; Scott Storch; Joseph Cartagena; Ian Blake; K. C. Porter; Gómez-Escolar	Cabrera	4:46
3.	"Vuelve"	Franco De Vita	Cabrera	5:07
4.	"Revolución"	Blake; Porter; Gómez-Escolar	Cabrera	4:15
5.	"It's Alright"	López; Soraya Lamilla; Javier García; George Pajon Jr.	Cabrera	4:32
6.	"Livin' la Vida Loca"	Rosa; Desmond Child	Cabrera	3:53
7.	"Somos la Semilla"	Blake; Porter; Manolo Tena	Cabrera	4:07
8.	"Rave Intro/Drop It on Me/Lola, Lola/The Cup of Life"	Martin; will.i.am; Francisco Saldaña; Victor Cabrera; Pajon Jr.; Toby Gad; Melanie Smith; Ramón Ayala; Mohandas Dewese; Bobby Robinson; Rosa; Porter; Gómez-Escolar; Child	Cabrera	12:20
9.	"Tal Vez"	Vita	Cabrera	4:34
10.	"Tu Recuerdo" (featuring La Mari of Chambao)	Torres	Cabrera	5:42

DVD / Blu-ray
No.	Title	Writer(s)	Note(s)	Length
1.	"Underwater Intro"	Cabrera	Act I Tribal
2.	"Pégate/Raza de Mil Colores/Por Arriba, Por Abajo" (Medley)	Martin; Tavaré; Torres; López; Marrufo; Zambrano; Rosa; Gómez-Escolar; Lemos; Aponte	Act I Tribal
3.	"This Is Good"	Martin; George Noriega; López; Lauren Christy; Graham Edwards; Scott Spock; Storch	Act I Tribal
4.	"Indonesian Transition"	Cabrera	Act I Tribal
5.	"Jaleo"	Antonio Rayo "Rayito"; José Miguel Velásquez	Act I Tribal
6.	"I Don't Care/María" (Medley)	Garrett; Storch; Cartagena; Blake; Porter; Gómez-Escolar	Act I Tribal
7.	"Hindu Dance Transition"	Cabrera	Act I Tribal
8.	"Vuelve"	Vita	Act II Romance
9.	"Gracias por Pensar en Mi"	Renato Russo; Martin	Act II Romance
10.	"Fuego de Noche, Nieve de Día"	Blake; Porter; Gómez-Escolar	Act II Romance
11.	"She's All I Ever Had/Bella"	Rosa; Noriega; Jon Secada; Gómez-Escolar	Act II Romance
12.	"Rebirth/Tattoo Intro"	Cabrera	Act III Revolucion
13.	"Revolución"	Blake; Porter; Gómez-Escolar	Act III Revolucion
14.	"It's Alright"	López; Lamilla; García; Pajon Jr.	Act III Revolucion
15.	"Livin' La Vida Loca"	Rosa; Child	Act III Revolucion
16.	"Somos la Semilla"	Blake; Porter; Tena	Act III Revolucion
17.	"Asignatura Pendiente"	Ricardo Arjona	Act III Revolucion
18.	"Rave Intro"	Cabrera	Act IV Rave
19.	"Drop It on Me/Lola Lola/La Bomba" (Medley)	Martin; will.i.am; Saldaña; Cabrera; Pajon Jr.; Gad; Smith; Ayala; Dewese; Robinson; Rosa; Porter; Gómez-Escolar	Act IV Rave
20.	"The Cup of Life"	Rosa; Child; Gómez-Escolar	Act IV Rave
21.	"Tal Vez"	Vita	Encore
22.	"Tu Recuerdo" (featuring La Mari of Chambao)	Torres	Encore
23.	"Behind the scenes"		Special feature	14:13
24.	"Video screens" (Underwater Intro; This Is Good; I Don't Care/María; Rebirth/Tattoo Intro; Revolución; It's Alright; Drop It on Me; La Bomba; The Cup of Life)		Special feature	35:52

== Personnel ==
- Ricky Martin: performer, executive producer, concept
- Bruno Del Granado: executive producer
- José Vega: executive producer
- Jamie King: stage director
- David Cabrera: music producer
- Dago González: visual concept
- Mónica Sosa: line producer
- Josue Balsiero: cover photography
- Berny Flores: back cover photography
- Roman Diaz: wardrobe and costumes
- Dancers: Jason Young (dance captain), Mihran Kirakosian, Christopher "War" Martinez, Tony Talauega, Tye Myers, Reshma Gajjar, Micki Duran, Vlada Gorbaneva
- Musicians: Carlos David Perez, Waldo Madera, Ben Stivers, Ron Dziubla, Juan Quinones, RJ Ronquillo, Daniel Lopez, Phil McArthur, Jackie Mendez, Victor Vazquez

== Charts ==
=== Weekly charts ===
Chart (2007)	Peak position
Argentine Albums (CAPIF)	3
Italian Albums (FIMI)	84
Mexican Albums (Top 100 Mexico)	24
Spanish DVDs (PROMUSICAE)	2
US Top Latin Albums (Billboard)	12
US Latin Pop Albums (Billboard)	7
US Music Video Sales (Billboard)	11

== Certifications and sales ==
Album

Region	Certification	Certified units/sales
Argentina (CAPIF)	Gold	20,000^{^}
Mexico (AMPROFON)	Gold	50,000^{^}
^{^} Shipments figures based on certification alone.

DVD

Region	Certification	Certified units/sales
Argentina (CAPIF) CD/DVD	Gold	20,000^{^}
Spain (Promusicae) DVD	Gold	10,000^{^}
^{^} Shipments figures based on certification alone.

== Release history ==
Region	Date	Label	Format	Catalog
United States	November 6, 2007	Sony BMG Norte	CD	8869717490
United States	November 6, 2007	Sony BMG Norte	DVD	40459
United States	November 6, 2007	Sony BMG Norte	CD/DVD	
Europe	November 16, 2007	Columbia	CD	88697174902
Taiwan	November 30, 2007	Sony Music	CD	88697174902
Taiwan	December 18, 2007	Sony Music	DVD	88697140459
Japan	February 20, 2008	Sony Music Japan	CD/DVD	SICP-1747～SICP-1748
United States	November 25, 2008	Norte	Blu-ray Disc	
