= 17 (Ricky Martin album) =

Greatest hits album by Ricky Martin
- Released: November 18, 2008
- Recorded: 1993–2006
- Genre: Latin pop; dance-pop
- Length: 74:29 (CD); 71:00 (DVD)
- Label: Columbia; Sony BMG Norte

Ricky Martin chronology
Ricky Martin... Live Black & White Tour (2007)	17 (2008)	Música + Alma + Sexo (2011)

Ricky Martin video chronology
Ricky Martin... Live Black & White Tour (2007)	17 (2008)

17 is a greatest hits album by Puerto Rican singer Ricky Martin, released on CD and DVD by Sony BMG Norte in the United States and Latin America on November 18, 2008. The CD includes seventeen songs from seventeen years of Martin's music career. It contains thirteen Spanish-language hits, two English-language songs and two Spanglish tracks. 17 does not include any new material, however, some songs are featured in remixed versions. The DVD track listing varies from the CD and contains a few other hits.

== Critical reception ==
Professional ratings
Review scores
Source	Rating
AllMusic	4/5 stars

AllMusic awarded the album four stars out of five, with a review by Stephen Thomas Erlewine stating: "Given its approach, it should be no surprise that this is heavy on Latin material, to the extent that even his huge crossover hit, "Livin' la Vida Loca," is here in Spanish rather than English. Therefore, this isn't a compilation for the curious fellow pop travelers who only want to hear turn-of-the-millennium monsters like "She Bangs," a hit single that's not even here. Instead, this is a sampler, giving a taste of what Martin has done over the years, and in that regard it's successful, even if it's not definitive".

== Commercial performance ==
17 peaked inside top ten in Argentina and Mexico, and reached number sixteen in Spain, number nineteen in Greece, and number twenty-one on the Top Latin Albums in the United States.

== Track listing ==
CD
No.	Title	Writer(s)	Producer(s)	Length
1.	"Fuego Contra Fuego" (2001 version)	Carlos Goméz; Mariano Pérez	López; Torres	4:26
2.	"El Amor de Mi Vida" (2001 version)	Eddie Sierra	López; Torres	3:57
3.	"Que Día Es Hoy" ("Self Control"; remix)	Mikel Herzog	Juan Carlos Calderón; Mikel Herzog	4:50
4.	"Te Extraño, Te Olvido, Te Amo"	Carlos Lara	Porter	4:39
5.	"María" (remix Spanglish version)	Luis Gómez-Escolar; K. C. Porter; Ian Blake	Porter; Rosa; Pablo Flores; Javier Garza	4:30
6.	"Vuelve"	Franco De Vita	Porter; Rosa	5:08
7.	"La Copa de la Vida" (remix Spanglish version)	Gómez-Escolar; Desmond Child; Draco Rosa	Child; Rosa	4:37
8.	"La Bomba" (remix)	Gómez-Escolar; Porter; Rosa	Porter; Rosa	4:27
9.	"Livin' la Vida Loca"	Gómez-Escolar; Child; Rosa	Child	4:03
10.	"Bella" (She's All I Ever Had)	Gómez-Escolar; Jon Secada; Rosa; George Noriega	Secada; Noriega	4:54
11.	"Nobody Wants to Be Lonely" (with Christina Aguilera)	Child; Victoria Shaw; Gary Burr	Walter Afanasieff	4:12
12.	"Tal Vez"	Vita	Tommy Torres	4:39
13.	"Asignatura Pendiente"	Ricardo Arjona	Torres	3:58
14.	"Y Todo Queda en Nada"	Estéfano; Julio Reyes	Estéfano	4:38
15.	"I Don't Care" (remix; featuring Fat Joe and Amerie)	Joe Cartagena; Scott Storch; Sean Garrett	Storch	3:36
16.	"Déjate Llevar" (It's Alright)	Danny López; George Pajon Jr.; Javier García; Soraya Lamilla	will.i.am; López; Pajon	3:34
17.	"Tu Recuerdo" (live; featuring La Mari)	Tommy Torres	Torres	4:07

iTunes bonus track
No.	Title	Writer(s)	Producer(s)	Length
18.	"I'm on My Way"	Child; Rosa; Juan Vicente Zambrano	Zambrano	4:36

DVD
No.	Title	Length
1.	"Te Extraño, Te Olvido, Te Amo"	4:00
2.	"María" (Spanglish version)	4:36
3.	"Fuego de Noche, Nieve de Día"	5:40
4.	"Vuelve"	4:45
5.	"La Copa de la Vida" (Spanglish version)	4:27
6.	"La Bomba"	3:46
7.	"Livin' La Vida Loca" (Spanish version)	3:41
8.	"Bella"	4:13
9.	"She Bangs" (Spanish version)	4:05
10.	"Loaded"	4:17
11.	"Sólo Quiero Amarte"	4:07
12.	"Tal Vez"	4:38
13.	"Jaleo"	3:41
14.	"Y Todo Queda en Nada"	4:36
15.	"Juramento" (Spanglish version)	3:32
16.	"Qué Más Da" (featuring Fat Joe and Debi Nova)	3:54
17.	"Déjate Llevar"	3:22
18.	"Que Dia es Hoy" (remix; bonus video)	4:59
19.	"Life featurette/Life album (2005)" (bonus material)	11:00
20.	"Behind the scenes/Almas del Silencio album (2003)" (bonus material)	9:20

== Charts ==
=== Weekly charts ===
Weekly chart performance for 17
Chart (2008–2010)	Peak position
Argentinian Albums (CAPIF)	4
Greek Albums (IFPI)	19
Mexican Albums (Top 100 Mexico)	10
Spanish Albums (Promusicae)	16
US Top Latin Albums (Billboard)	21
US Latin Pop Albums (Billboard)	5
US Music Video Sales (Billboard)	25

=== Monthly charts ===
Monthly chart performance for 17
Chart (2008)	Position
Uruguayan Albums (CUD)	7

=== Year-end charts ===
2008 year-end chart performance for 17
Chart (2008)	Position
Mexican Albums (Top 100 Mexico)	97

2009 year-end chart performance for 17
Chart (2009)	Position
US Latin Pop Albums (Billboard)	19

== Release history ==
Release history and formats for 17
Region	Date	Label	Format	Catalog
United States	November 18, 2008	Sony BMG Norte	CD	8869739495
United States	November 18, 2008	Sony BMG Norte	DVD	739494
United States	February 10, 2009	Sony BMG Norte	CD/DVD	739496
Switzerland	July 10, 2009	Columbia	CD/DVD	88697433152
