= Vuelve (Ricky Martin song) =

Single by Ricky Martin

from the album Vuelve
- Language: Spanish
- B-side: "Entre el Amor y los Halagos"; "Vuelo"; "Susana"
- Released: January 26, 1998
- Recorded: 1997
- Genre: Latin pop; rock; gospel
- Length: 5:08
- Label: Sony Discos; Columbia
- Songwriter: Franco De Vita
- Producers: K. C. Porter; Draco Rosa

Ricky Martin singles chronology
| "Corazón" (1997) | "Vuelve" (1998) | "The Cup of Life" (1998) |

Music video
- "Vuelve" on YouTube

"Vuelve" (transl. "Come Back") is a song recorded by Puerto Rican singer Ricky Martin for his fourth studio album, Vuelve (1998). The song was written by Franco De Vita, while the production was handled by K. C. Porter and Draco Rosa. It was released to radio stations by Sony Discos as the lead single from the album on January 26, 1998. A Spanish language power ballad and Latin pop song with elements of rock and gospel, it is about the singer's true love, who gives meaning to his life. It received generally positive reviews from music critics, who complimented its romantic lyrics and Martin's vocals.

"Vuelve" was nominated for Pop Song of the Year at the 11th Annual Lo Nuestro Awards and won the award for Latin Pop Airplay Track of the Year at the 1999 Billboard Latin Music Awards. The song was commercially successful, reaching number one in eight countries, including Peru and Venezuela, as well as Billboard's Hot Latin Songs, Latin Pop Airplay, and Tropical Airplay charts in the United States. The accompanying music video was filmed at the Ennis House in Los Angeles, California, and directed by Wayne Isham. It depicts Martin performing the track in various areas of the house. The track was included on the set lists for all of Martin's tours. De Vita recorded his own rendition of "Vuelve" on his studio album Segundas Partes Tambien Son Buenas (2002), and several contestants on various music talent shows have covered the song, including La Mole.

== Background and release ==
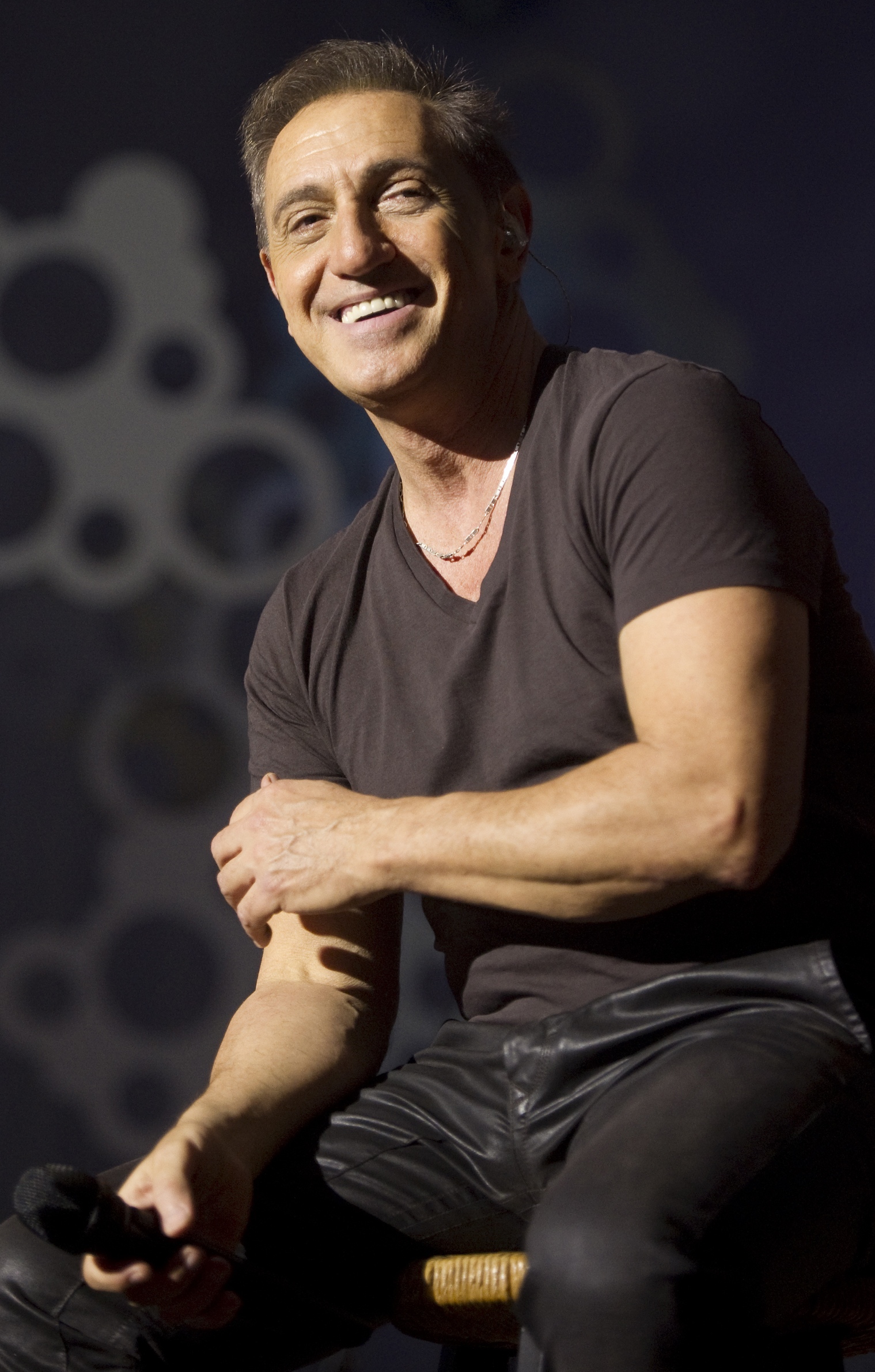
"Vuelve" was written by Venezuelan singer-songwriter Franco De Vita and was released as the lead single for the album. De Vita would later cover the song on his studio album Segundas Partes Tambien Son Buenas (2002).

In 1995, Ricky Martin released his third studio album, A Medio Vivir. On it, he shifted from his traditional ballad-style compositions to a riskier fusion of music focused on traditional Latin sounds, epitomized by the song "María". Taken aback by the starkly different musical style, his record label executives felt the song would ruin Martin's career. Despite this, "María" was chosen as the album's second single and became a breakthrough hit, reaching number one in France, Spain, Germany, Belgium, Holland, Switzerland, Finland, Italy, Turkey, and the whole of South America. As of 2014, A Medio Vivir had sold over three million copies worldwide. While on tour in 1997, Martin returned to the studio and began recording material for his fourth studio album. He said the experience of touring and recording at the same time was "brutal and incredibly intense". On December 7, 1997, Martin confirmed he was completing his next project and that the album would be released in February of the following year. He worked on the album with producers KC Porter and Rosa, and recorded it in studios across the United States, Puerto Rico, and Spain.

The album's title, Vuelve, was announced on January 25, 1998. In an interview with CNN en Español, he emphasized the album was going to "reaffirm the internationalization of my career and I know that it will help me a lot to destroy the stereotypes that may exist with my culture". The album consists mainly of "red-hot" Latin dance numbers and "melodramatic" pop ballads. "Vuelve" was released as the album's lead single on January 26, 1998. While "La Copa de la Vida" was released as the lead single from the album in Asian and European markets, "Vuelve" was released as the third single in Austria and Germany on December 2, 1998. The track was included as the second track on Martin's fourth studio album, Vuelve, released February 12, 1998; the song was also later added to Martin's compilation albums La Historia (2001), 17 (2008), Personalidad (2015), and Esencial (2018). De Vita recorded his own version of the song on his studio album Segundas Partes Tambien Son Buenas (2002), with a "distinctly rock sound". When De Vita was asked why he made his own rendition of the song in an interview with El País, he clarified that he was not competing with Martin and simply wanted to give the track "another point of view".

== Music and lyrics ==
"Vuelve"
A 15-second sample of the chorus, which features elements of gospel.

"Vuelve" was penned by Venezuelan singer-songwriter Franco De Vita, while its production was handled by KC Porter and Rosa. A Spanish language power ballad and Latin pop song with "slow rock harmonies", it is a "sultry" romantic love song with a gospel chorus. The track runs for a total of five minutes and eight seconds. Lyrically, "Vuelve" which translates to "Come Back" in English, is for Martin's "true love, whom he says gives his life meaning". In a 2007 interview with Estudio Billboard, De Vita recalled he had been writing the song for 10 years when Martin asked him to compose a track for the album. He had previously collaborated with Martin by composing the previous album's title track. In the track, Martin chants: "Vuelve, que sin ti la vida se me va. Vuelve, que me falta el aire si tú no estás. Vuelve, nadie ocupará tu lugar" ("Come back, without you my life goes away. Come back, the air is missing if you're not here. Come back, nobody will take your place.")

== Critical reception ==
"Vuelve" has been met with generally positive reviews from music critics. John Lannert of Billboard magazine described the track as "moving", while David Wild of Rolling Stone mentioned it as "lovely". An author of Radio Cooperativa named it "pure romanticism", and Vilma Maldonado of The Monitor called the song's hook "instant and unforgettable" and its lyrics "warmly romantic". Writing for Vista magazine, Carmen Teresa Roiz regarded "Vuelve" as a "brilliant, melodic work". For The Dallas Morning News, Mario Tarradell praised its "sexy" refrain and felt it "makes the best of his power-keg vocals". Although she acknowledged the song's success on the music charts, the Miami Herald editor Leila Cobo criticized "Vuelve" as one of the album's "weakest tracks". In a 2018 article for Billboard however, Cobo reflected on "Vuelve" and cited it as an example of Latin pop having previously been a "crooner’s game" and remarked: "[...] thank God for songs like 'Si No Te Hubieras Ido', 'Vuelve' or 'El Buen Perdedor' - how could we have survived heartache otherwise?" The Los Angeles Times' Ernesto Lechner declared that the song's "delicate electric piano and anthemic chorus" would make its parent album "most likely survive the test of time".

Carlos Mario Castro from El Sabanero X named "Vuelve" Martin's best song, calling it "great without a doubt". He continued praising it for highlighting "the vocal capacity of Ricky Martin". An author of Cultura Colectiva named it Martin's "best heartbreak anthem" and stated: "Even if your heart is in a good place, this song is great to sing your lungs out." In a retrospective review of the Latin songs that reached number one in 1998, Billboard editor Jessica Roiz stated Martin "made everyone shed a tear" on "Vuelve". In 2015, Univision staff ranked the track as Martin's sixth-best ballad. Similarly, Claudia González Alvarado from Chilango ranked it as his sixth-best ballad in 2021. It was listed on MDZ Online's Ricky Martin's "Unmissable hits" which a writer described as "creative", and was mentioned as one of the 13 "Best Ricky Martin Songs to Add to Your Party Playlist" by Amanda Mitchell on Oprah Daily. MTV Argentina also ranked it as one of Martin's best songs in 2020. In his review for Vogue in 2021, Esteban Villaseñor ranked the song among Martin's most popular songs.

=== Accolades ===
Greta Alvarez from BuzzFeed placed "Vuelve" at number five on the list of "17 songs we all sang in the 90s and could never forget". In honor of National Hispanic Heritage Month in 2017, Grammy published a list of "11 Songs From Puerto Rican Artists", in which "Vuelve" was at the top of the list. At the 11th Annual Lo Nuestro Awards, the song was nominated in the category of Pop Song of the Year, which was awarded to Martin's "La Copa de la Vida". At the 6th Annual Billboard Latin Music Awards in the same year, "Vuelve" won Latin Pop Airplay Track of the Year and was nominated for Hot Latin Track of the Year, but lost to "Por Mujeres Como Tu" by Pepe Aguilar. The track was recognized as one of the best-performing songs of the year on the Pop/Ballad field at the 1999 ASCAP Latin Awards.

== Commercial performance ==
"Vuelve" is one of Martin's most commercially successful songs in his career. In Latin America, it reached number one in Costa Rica El Salvador, Guatemala, Honduras, Nicaragua, Peru, Puerto Rico, and Venezuela. It also peaked at number five in Panama and on the ballads chart in Mexico. In the United States, "Vuelve" debuted at number five on the Billboard Hot Latin Songs on the week of February 14, 1998. The single reached on top of the chart two weeks later, succeeding "My Heart Will Go On" by Celine Dion, becoming Martin's first number one hit in the chart. It spent two consecutive weeks in this position being replaced by "No Sé Olvidar" by Alejandro Fernández. "Vuelve" ended 1998 as the fourth best-performing song of 1998. The track also reached the top of the Latin Pop Airplay and Tropical Airplay charts. On the former chart, it spent a total of three weeks in this position and was the best-performing song of the year. In November 1999, it was labeled as one of the "hottest tracks" for Sony Discos in a list including the most successful songs released by the label since the launching of the Billboard Hot Latin Tracks chart in 1986.

== Music video ==
A screenshot from the music video, depicting Martin standing at the Ennis House.

A music video for "Vuelve" was filmed at the Ennis House in Los Angeles, California, and directed by American director Wayne Isham. At the beginning of the video, Martin is facing the rain. Afterwards, he appears performing the track at various areas of the house. Carlos Mario Castro from El Sabanero X described the visual as "simple but high quality". Cristal Mesa from mitú named it Martin's 24th best music video on her 2018 list and commented on that the "fresh-faced singer was melting hearts with his smooth face and extra stylized hair". An author of Cultura Colectiva listed it among the "13 Videos to Appreciate Ricky Martin's Talent and Sickening Good Looks". It was later included on Martin's video compilation albums The Ricky Martin Video Collection (1999), La Historia (2001), and 17 (2008). The music video was uploaded on the singer's YouTube channel on October 3, 2009, and has received over 90 million views, as of September 2021.

== Live performances and appearances in media ==
The day after releasing the album, Martin held two sold-out concerts at the 30,000-seat Hiram Bithorn Stadium in Puerto Rico on February 13 and 14, 1998, respectively, where he performed "Vuelve". It was included as part of the setlist for the "Vuelve Tour", and subsequent tours including the Livin' la Vida Loca Tour, One Night Only with Ricky Martin, Música + Alma + Sexo World Tour, Ricky Martin Live, Live in Mexico, One World Tour, All In, the Movimiento Tour, and the Enrique Iglesias and Ricky Martin Live in Concert. He also performed "Vuelve" along with his other hits during the 48th, 55th, and 61st editions of the Viña del Mar International Song Festival in 2007, 2014, and 2020, respectively. A live version of "Vuelve" was recorded and taped as part of his MTV Unplugged set in Miami, Florida on August 17, 2006. This version of "Vuelve" reached number seven in Chile according to the Associated Press. The artist then promoted MTV Unplugged with the Black and White Tour, including four sold-out shows at the José Miguel Agrelot Coliseum in Puerto Rico. The concerts in Puerto Rico were compiled into his second live album Ricky Martin... Live Black & White Tour (2007) which includes his performance of "Vuelve". De Vita included "Vuelve" on the set list for his Libre Tour in 2017.

Dominican Republic singer-songwriter Juan Luis Guerra performed a live bachata cover of the song at the Latin Recording Academy Person of the Year gala where Martin was honored with the accolade in 2006 and Guerra's rendition received the most applause. "Vuelve" has been covered by several contestants on various music talent shows. Andrea López y Jonathan González performed the song on the third season of Cantando por un Sueño in 2011. The following year, La Mole performed it on its fourth season along with Natalie Scalzadonna. In the same year, Gonzalo Andrada covered the track on La Voz Argentina's first season. On its third season in 2021, Alex Freidig and Oscar Rojas competed in a battle of covering the song, which Freidig won. Also in 2021, Yohan Amparo performed the track on season one of The Voice Dominicana. Prior to the single's release, "Vuelve" served as the theme song for the Mexican telenovela Sin ti which premiered on December 8, 1997.

== Formats and track listings ==
Austrian CD single

1. "Vuelve" – 5:08
2. "Entre el Amor y los Halagos" – 4:20

German CD maxi-single

1. "Vuelve" – 5:08
2. "Entre el Amor y los Halagos" – 4:20
3. "Vuelo" – 3:58
4. "Susana" – 4:54

Mexican 7" single

1. "Vuelve" – 5:08
2. "La Copa de la Vida" – 4:29

Mexican promotional single

1. "Vuelve" – 5:08

== Credits and personnel ==
Credits adapted from Tidal.

- Ricky Martin – vocal, associated performer
- Franco De Vita – composer, lyricist
- Robi Draco Rosa – producer, background vocal, recording engineer
- K.C. Porter – producer, piano
- David Campbell – arranger
- Kieran Murray – assistant engineer
- Rafa Sardina – assistant engineer
- Teresa Cassin – assistant engineer
- Scott Kieklak – assistant engineer
- Robert Valdez – assistant engineer
- Paul Gordon – assistant engineer
- Bill Smith – assistant engineer
- Luis Villanueva – assistant engineer
- Alberto Pino – assistant engineer
- Dave Dominguez – assistant engineer
- Francisco "Panchoî" – assistant engineer
- Tomaselli – assistant engineer
- Gene Lo – assistant engineer
- Iris Salazar – assistant engineer
- Jeff Shannon – assistant engineer
- Jorge M. Jaramillo – assistant engineer
- Juan Rosario – assistant engineer
- Jules Condar – assistant engineer, recording engineer
- Julia Waters – background vocal
- Phil Perry – background vocal
- Ricky Nelson – background vocal
- John West – background vocal
- Darryl Phinnessee – background vocal
- Josie Aiello – background vocal
- Oren Waters – background vocal
- Carmen Twillie – background vocal
- Stefanie Spruill – background vocal
- James Gilstrap – background vocal
- Kristle Murden – background vocal
- Marlena Jeter – background vocal
- Bunny Hill – background vocal
- GB Dorsey – background vocal
- Jackeline Simley – background vocal
- Katrina Harper – background vocal
- Martonette Jenkins – background vocal
- Maxine Jeter – background vocal
- Phillip Ingram – background vocal
- Reggie Hamilton – bass
- Curt Bisquera – drums
- Michael Landau – electric guitar
- Benny Faccone – mixing engineer
- Bobby Rothstein – mixing engineer
- Chris Brooke – mixing engineer
- Jun Murakawa – mixing engineer
- Luis Quiñe – mixing engineer
- Mike Aarvold – mixing engineer
- Mike Ainsworth – mixing engineer
- Travis Smith – mixing engineer
- Chris Carroll – mixing engineer
- Todd Keller – mixing engineer
- Leo Herrera – mixing engineer
- John Beasley – piano
- Randy Waldman – piano
- Esteban Villanueva – project coordintor, recording engineer
- Sarah Wykes – project coordintor
- Iris Aponte – project coordintor
- Steve Churchyard – recording engineer
- John Lowson – recording engineer
- Ted Stein – recording engineer
- Robert Fernandez – recording engineer
- Brian Jenkins – recording engineer
- Doc Wiley – recording engineer
- Benny Faccone – recording engineer
- Carlos Nieto – recording engineer
- Charles Dye – recording engineer
- Danny Vicari – recording engineer
- Femio Hernandez – recording engineer
- Héctor Iván Rosa – recording engineer
- Jeff Poe – recording engineer
- Jesus "Chuy" Flores – recording engineer
- John Karpowich – recording engineer
- Karl Cameron – recording engineer
- Keith Rose – recording engineer
- Luis Fernando Soria – recording engineer
- Matt Ross Hyde – recording engineer
- Peter McCabe – recording engineer
- Rik Pekkonen – recording engineer

== Charts ==
=== Weekly charts ===
Chart performance for "Vuelve"
| Chart (1998) | Peak position |
|---|---|
| Costa Rica (Notimex) | 1 |
| El Salvador (Notimex) | 1 |
| Guatemala (Notimex) | 1 |
| Honduras (Notimex) | 1 |
| Mexico Ballads (Notimex) | 5 |
| Nicaragua (Notimex) | 1 |
| Panama (Notimex) | 5 |
| Peru (Notimex) | 1 |
| Puerto Rico (Notimex) | 1 |
| US Hot Latin Songs (Billboard) | 1 |
| US Latin Pop Airplay (Billboard) | 1 |
| US Tropical Airplay (Billboard) | 1 |
| Venezuela (Record Report) | 1 |

Chart performance for "Vuelve (MTV Unplugged Version)"
| Chart (2007) | Peak position |
|---|---|
| Chile (Associated Press) | 7 |

=== Year-end charts ===
1998 year-end chart performance for "Vuelve"
| Chart (1998) | Position |
|---|---|
| US Hot Latin Songs (Billboard) | 4 |
| US Latin Pop Airplay (Billboard) | 1 |

== Release history ==
Release dates and formats for "Vuelve"
| Country | Date | Format | Label | Ref. |
|---|---|---|---|---|
| Mexico | December 8, 1997 | Television premiere | Sony Mexico | |
| United States | January 27, 1998 | Radio premiere | Sony Discos | |
| Austria; Germany | December 2, 1998 | CD single | Columbia | |

== See also ==
- Billboard Hot Latin Songs Year-End Chart
- List of number-one Billboard Hot Latin Tracks of 1998
- List of Billboard Latin Pop Airplay number ones of 1998
- List of Billboard Tropical Airplay number ones of 1998
