= VOF de Kunst =

Dutch pop music group

VOF de Kunst (Dutch pronunciation: [ˌveːjoːˈɛv də ˈkʏnst]), better known in Europe as The Art Company, is a Dutch pop group from Tilburg founded in 1983. Their hit song was "Suzanne" (or "Susanna") which reached No. 1 and No. 12 on the charts in the Netherlands and UK, respectively. The lead singer of the band is Nol Havens, and they have also toured using The Art Company name. This latter moniker was used for their only UK hit.

== Discography ==
The group has released 18 albums, including 1 live album.

The group has also produced albums of traditional festive songs and songs based on nursery rhymes and the works of Annie M. G. Schmidt. Since 1996, they have also played in theatre productions.

- 1983: Maandagmorgen 6:30
- 1984: Een Jaar Later
- 1987: Onbeperkt Houdbaar
- 1988: Open Huis in Artis
- 1990: Dikkertje Dap & Andere Bekende TV-Liedjes Van Annie M.G. Schmidt
- 1991: De Kunst Live
- 1993: De Nette Man
- 1994: De Griezel CD
- 1997: De Kerstboom Spreekt
- 2000: Balen!
- 2004: Teunis
- 2005: Wilde Dierenliedjes
- 2006: Het Grote Boek van Madelief
- 2007: Vanaf Hier Nog 5 Kwartier
- 2008: Druk
- 2009: Muziek op Schoot
- 2010: VOF De Kunst Zingt Jip En Janneke
- 2013: 2(013)
