= The Ricky Martin Video Collection =

Video by Ricky Martin
- Released: October 5, 1999
- Genre: Latin pop, dance-pop, pop rock
- Length: 40:00
- Label: Columbia

Ricky Martin chronology
| The Ricky Martin Video Collection (1999) | One Night Only (1999) |

Professional ratings
Review scores
| Source | Rating |
|---|---|
| The Digital Bits | C |

The Ricky Martin Video Collection is a collection of 9 videos by Puerto Rican singer Ricky Martin. It was released on 5 October 1999, by Columbia Music Video in VHS and DVD formats, includes its best-known song, Livin' la Vida Loca as well as his other greatest hits María and his live Grammy performance of The Cup of Life, the official song of the 1998 FIFA World Cup in France.

== Commercial performance ==
In the United States, the DVD peaked at number 1 on the Billboard Top Music Videos chart and was later certified platinum by the Recording Industry Association of America (RIAA) for selling of 100,000 copies. Also in Canada was certified 6× Platinum by the Music Canada for shipments of 60,000 copies and was certified gold by the British Phonographic Industry (BPI) for selling of 25,000 copies in the United Kingdom.

== Track listing ==
| No. | Title | Length |
|---|---|---|
| 1. | "Livin' la Vida Loca" |
| 2. | "She's All I Ever Had" |
| 3. | "La Bomba" |
| 4. | "Perdido Sin Tí" |
| 5. | "Livin' la Vida Loca" (Spanish Version) |
| 6. | "Vuelve" |
| 7. | "María" (Pablo Flores Radio Edit) |
| 8. | "Bella (She's All I Ever Had)" |
| 9. | "The Cup of Life" (live Grammy performance) |

Bonus DVD material
| No. | Title | Length |
|---|---|---|
| 10. | "Bonus: Exclusive Behind-The-Scenes Footage" |

== Charts and certifications ==
=== Charts ===
| Chart | Peak position |
|---|---|
| U.S. Billboard Top Music Videos | 1 |

=== Certifications ===
| Region | Certification | Certified units/sales |
|---|---|---|
| Canada (Music Canada) | 6× Platinum | 60,000^{^} |
| United Kingdom (BPI) | Gold | 25,000^{*} |
| United States (RIAA) | Platinum | 100,000^{^} |
^{*} Sales figures based on certification alone.^{^} Shipments figures based on certification alone.

== Release history ==
| Region | Date | Label | Format | Catalog |
|---|---|---|---|---|
| United States | October 5, 1999 | Columbia Music Video | VHS | CV 50205 |
| United States | November 9, 1999 | Columbia Music Video | DVD | CVD 50205 |
| Taiwan | | Sony Music | VCD | MVCD 50205 |
| Taiwan | November 1, 1999 | Sony Music | DVD | CVD50205 |
| United Kingdom | December 6, 1999 | SMV Enterprises | DVD | 5099705020593 |
| Japan | August 23, 2000 | Epic Records | DVD | ESBA-2501 |
| Japan | November 21, 2007 | Epic Records | DVD | SIBP-90 |
| Brazil | | Columbia Music Video | DVD | 132.036/9-050205 |
