= Ask for More =

Single by Janet Jackson

Promotional single by Janet Jackson
- Released: January 1, 1999
- Genre: Pop; dance
- Length: 5:49
- Label: Pepsi; Black Doll, Inc.
- Songwriter(s): Janet Jackson; James Harris III; Terry Lewis; René Elizondo Jr.
- Producer(s): Jimmy Jam; Terry Lewis

"Ask for More" is a song performed by Janet Jackson as part of an advertising campaign for soft drink company Pepsi in 1999.

Alternate versions of the ad campaign with Ricky Martin and Aaron Kwok were released in international markets.

== Song information ==
"Ask for More" was a promotional single by Janet Jackson for Pepsi, released on January 1, 1999. Jackson commented on the collaboration with Pepsi saying "aside from being associated with many amazing artists over the years, Pepsi is very honest and passionate when it comes to spreading a positive message like 'Ask For More'".

The campaign was launched as a re-branding for Pepsi internationally. Alternate versions of the campaign also co-starred Hong Kong singer Aaron Kwok for the Asian market and aired in China, and Latino singer Ricky Martin for the Latin market and aired in Latin America. A duet version of the song performed in Spanish by Jackson and Martin was also aired in Europe as part of the commercial campaign. A full length promotional music video of the version with Kwok was released in Asian markets. The original version of the ad features model and dancer Rob Vinson. Dancers Tina Landon and Shawnette Heard appear in all versions of the ad along with Jackson.

The single was only released as a promotional recording. Consumers were able to receive a free CD of the song with the purchase of Pepsi products during the promotional campaign in 1999.

== Track listings ==
U.S. promo CD single (61369427AVRM) and U.K. promo CD single (61369427AVRM)

1. "Ask for More" – 5:49
2. Interview – 4:50
3. "Ask for More" (Remix) – 8:05

U.K. 12" promo

1. "Ask for More" (Masters at Work Remix) – 8:05

== Official remixes ==
- Single version – 5:49
- Vocal-Up Full Version – 5:49
- Masters at Work Remix – 8:05
