= Me Amaras (song) =

Single by Ricky Martin

from the album Me Amaras
- Released: January 25, 1993
- Recorded: 1992–93; New York City, Madrid
- Genre: Latin pop
- Length: 4:29
- Label: CBS International; Sony Music Mexico
- Songwriter: Juan Carlos Calderón
- Producer: Juan Carlos Calderón

Ricky Martin singles chronology
"Ser Feliz" (1993)	"Me Amaras" (1993)	"Que Dia Es Hoy" (1993)

Audio
- "Ricky Martin - Me Amaras (Audio)" on YouTube

"Me Amaras" (English: "You Will Love Me") is the first single from Ricky Martin's second studio solo album Me Amaras. It was released on January 25, 1993.

A music video was also released.

The song reached number six on the Hot Latin Songs in the United States.

== Formats and track listings ==
Latin America promotional 12" single

1. "Me Amaras" – 4:29

Brazilian promotional 12" single

1. "Me Amaras (Portuguese version)" – 4:26

== Charts ==
=== Weekly charts ===
Chart (1993)	Peak position
US Hot Latin Songs (Billboard)	6

=== Year-end charts ===
Chart (1993)	Position
US Hot Latin Songs (Billboard)	39
