= Bring a Little Lovin' =

1968 single by Los Bravos

Single by Los Bravos

from the album Bring a Little Lovin'
- Released: April 1968
- Recorded: 1968
- Genre: Pop rock; freakbeat; blue-eyed soul
- Length: 2:21
- Label: Parrot
- Songwriters: Harry Vanda; George Young
- Producer: Alain Milhaud

"Bring a Little Lovin'"

Song by The Easybeats

from the album Vigil (Australian version)
- Released: 1968
- Recorded: 1968
- Genre: Rock
- Length: 2:25
- Label: Albert Productions; Parlophone
- Songwriters: Harry Vanda; George Young
- Producers: The Easybeats; Mike Vaughan

"Bring a Little Lovin'" is a song written by Harry Vanda and George Young of the Australian rock group The Easybeats. The song was written for the Spanish band Los Bravos. Their version was released as a single in April 1968 and reached number fifty-one on the Billboard Hot 100 in the United States and the number two in Spain.

The Easybeats version was released later that year on the Australian version of their Vigil album. The Easybeats recording was originally a demo and was not released anywhere else in the world.

== Formats and track listings ==
7" single

1. "Bring a Little Lovin'" – 2:21
2. "Make It Last" – 2:39

== Charts ==
Chart (1968)	Peak position
Australia (KMR)	48
US Billboard Hot 100	51
Spain (40 Principales)	2
CAN RPM 100	22

== In popular culture ==
On March 20, 2019, Los Bravos' version of "Bring a Little Lovin'" was featured on the soundtrack and first teaser trailer for Once Upon a Time in Hollywood, as well as the film itself, the ninth film directed by Quentin Tarantino.

== Ricky Martin version ==
"Dime Que Me Quieres"

Single by Ricky Martin

from the album Ricky Martin
- Released: June 6, 1992
- Genre: Latin pop
- Length: 3:14
- Label: Sony Discos
- Songwriters: Harry Vanda, George Young, Frances Lay, Mariano Pérez
- Producer: Mariano Pérez Bautista

Ricky Martin singles chronology
"Vuelo" (1992)	"Dime Que Me Quieres" (1992)	"Susana" (1992)

Audio
- "Ricky Martin - Dime Que Me Quieres (Audio)" on YouTube

Ricky Martin recorded a Spanish-language version of "Bring a Little Lovin'", called "Dime Que Me Quieres" (English: "Tell Me You Love Me"). He included it on his debut solo album Ricky Martin, and released it as a single in 1992. A music video was also released.

=== Formats and track listings ===
Mexican promotional 12" maxi-single

1. "Dime Que Me Quieres (Bring a Little Lovin')" (Radio Mix) – 3:00
2. "Dime Que Me Quieres (Bring a Little Lovin')" (Dance Mix B/W) – 5:41
3. "Dime Que Me Quieres (Bring a Little Lovin')" (Dance Mix) – 5:41
4. "Dime Que Me Quieres (Bring a Little Lovin')" (Album Version) – 3:14

Brazilian promotional 12" single

1. "Diga Que Me Quere (Dime Que Me Quieres)" – 3:21

=== Charts ===
Chart (1992)	Peak position
Mexico (Canciones que México canta)	15
