= One Night Only (video) =

Video by Ricky Martin
- Released: December 14, 1999
- Genre: Latin pop, dance-pop, pop rock
- Length: 45:00
- Label: Columbia

Ricky Martin chronology
The Ricky Martin Video Collection (1999)	One Night Only (1999)	La Historia (2001)

One Night Only is a DVD of Ricky Martin's live performance that was released in the United States in December 1999. This presentation was filmed live at Liberty State Park. It was certified Platinum by the RIAA on May 31, 2000.

== Track listing ==
No.	Title	Length
1.	"Livin' la Vida Loca"
2.	"She's All I Ever Had"
3.	"Spanish Eyes/Lola, Lola" (Medley)
4.	"Shake Your Bon-Bon"
5.	"Light My Fire/Oye Como Va" (Guajira) (with Carlos Santana and José Feliciano)
6.	"María" (Live Remix)
7.	"The Cup of Life" (Live Remix)
8.	"Shake Your Bon-Bon" (music video) (DVD bonus)

== Charts and certifications ==
=== Charts ===
Chart	Peak position
U.S. Billboard Top Music Videos	2

== Certifications ==
Region	Certification	Certified units/sales
United States (RIAA)	Platinum	100,000^{^}
^{^} Shipments figures based on certification alone.

== Release history ==
Region	Date	Label	Format	Catalog
Taiwan	December 1, 1999	Sony Music	DVD	CVD50209
United States	December 14, 1999	Columbia Music Video	VHS	CV 50209
United States	January 25, 2000	Columbia Music Video	DVD	CVD 50209
Japan	August 2, 2000	Epic Records	DVD	ESBA-2502
