= La Historia (Ricky Martin album) =

Greatest hits album by Ricky Martin
- Released: February 27, 2001
- Genres: Dance-pop; Latin pop
- Length: 72:35
- Language: Spanish
- Label: Columbia

Ricky Martin albums chronology
Sound Loaded (2000)	La Historia (2001)	The Best of Ricky Martin (2001)

Ricky Martin video chronology
One Night Only (1999)	La Historia (2001)	Europa: European Tour (2001)

Singles from La Historia
- 1. "Fuego Contra Fuego" Released: March 5, 2001

Professional ratings
Review scores
Source	Rating
AllMusic	4/5 stars
The New Rolling Stone Album Guide	2/5 stars

La Historia (English: The History) is the first compilation album of the Puerto Rican singer and composer Ricky Martin. It was released on February 27, 2001, by Sony Discos and Columbia Records. The recordings are in Spanish. The album contains reworkings of two of Martin's early songs: "Fuego Contra Fuego" and "El Amor de Mi Vida". The compilation was released in two different formats. The CD edition contains sixteen of his best songs, in the American and Japanese versions, the song "Sólo Quiero Amarte" is included (the Spanish version of "Nobody Wants to Be Lonely"). The DVD edition contains thirteen music videos of Martin.

== Commercial performance ==
La Historia wasn't promoted by any single, did not include any new recordings, and contains only Spanish-language songs.

In the United States, La Historia peaked at number one for five weeks on the Billboard's Top Latin Albums and number eighty-three on the Billboard 200. It was certified 4× Platinum Latin award for shipping 400,000 units in the US, and has sold 220,000 copies, according to Nielsen SoundScan (as of January 2011).

The album also topped the chart in Argentina and Sweden, and was certified Platinum in both countries. Other achievements include peaks at number thirteen in Spain, number sixteen in Italy, number twenty-three in Switzerland, and number thirty-seven in Japan. La Historia was also certified Gold in Spain.

== Accolades ==
La Historia was nominated as the Latin Greatest Hits Album of the Year at the 2002 Latin Billboard Music Awards but lost to Vicente Fernández's Historia de un Ídolo, Vol. 1.

== Track listing ==
CD
No.	Title	Writer(s)	Producer(s)	Length
1.	"María" (Spanglish Radio Edit)	Ian Blake; Luis Gómez-Escolar; K. C. Porter	Porter; Blake; Pablo Flores; Javier Garza	4:31
2.	"Vuelve"	Franco De Vita	Porter; Robi Draco Rosa	5:09
3.	"Bella" (She's All I Ever Had)	Rosa; George Noriega; Jon Secada; Gómez-Escolar	Secada; Noriega; Rosa; Emilio Estefan Jr.; Walter Afanasieff	4:57
4.	"La Bomba"	Rosa; Porter; Gómez-Escolar	Porter; Rosa	4:37
5.	"A Medio Vivir"	Vita	Porter; Blake	4:43
6.	"Perdido Sin Ti"	Rosa; Porter; Gómez-Escolar	Porter; Rosa	4:10
7.	"Livin' la Vida Loca" (Spanish Version)	Rosa; Desmond Child; Gómez-Escolar	Child; Rosa	4:05
8.	"Volverás"	Blake; Porter; Gómez-Escolar; Ricky Martin	Porter; Blake	4:49
9.	"La Copa de la Vida" (Spanish Version)	Rosa; Child; Gómez-Escolar	Child; Rosa	4:30
10.	"Fuego de Noche, Nieve de Día"	Blake; Porter; Gómez-Escolar	Porter; Blake	5:36
11.	"She Bangs" (Spanish Version)	Rosa; Afanasieff; Child; Glenn Monroig; Julia Sierra; Daniel López	Rosa; Afanasieff; Child	4:37
12.	"Bombón de Azúcar"	Mark Kilpatrick; Gustavo Laureano; Carlos Figueroa; John Lengel; Carlos Rolón	Porter; Blake	4:59
13.	"Fuego Contra Fuego" (New Version)	Mariano Pérez; Carlos Gómez	Tommy Torres; López	4:27
14.	"Te Extraño, Te Olvido, Te Amo"	Carlos Lara	Porter; Blake	4:39
15.	"Por Arriba, Por Abajo"	Rosa; Gómez-Escolar; César Lemos; Karla Aponte	Porter; Rosa	3:08
16.	"El Amor de Mi Vida" (New Version)	Eddie Sierra	Torres; López	3:58

US/Japanese bonus track
No.	Title	Writer(s)	Producer(s)	Length
17.	"Sólo Quiero Amarte" (Nobody Wants to Be Lonely) (Radio Edit)	Child; Victoria Shaw; Gary Burr; Martin; López	Child	3:59

DVD
No.	Title	Length
1.	"María" (Spanglish Radio Edit)
2.	"Te Extraño, Te Olvido, Te Amo"
3.	"Fuego de Noche, Nieve de Día"
4.	"Volverás"
5.	"Vuelve"
6.	"La Copa de la Vida"
7.	"La Bomba"
8.	"Por Arriba, Por Abajo"
9.	"Perdido Sin Tí"
10.	"Livin' la Vida Loca" (Spanish Version)
11.	"Bella"
12.	"She Bangs" (Spanish Version)
13.	"Sólo Quiero Amarte"

== Charts ==
=== Weekly charts ===
Chart (2001)	Peak position
Argentinian Albums (CAPIF)	1
European Albums (Top 100)	42
Italian Albums (FIMI)	16
Japanese Albums (Oricon)	37
Spanish Albums (PROMUSICAE)	13
Swedish Albums (Sverigetopplistan)	1
Swiss Albums (Schweizer Hitparade)	23
US Billboard 200	83
US Top Latin Albums (Billboard)	1
US Latin Pop Albums (Billboard)	1

=== Year-end charts ===
Chart (2001)	Position
Argentine Albums (CAPIF)	15
Swedish Albums (Sverigetopplistan)	6
US Top Latin Albums (Billboard)	6
US Latin Pop Albums (Billboard)	4

== Certifications and sales ==
Album

Region	Certification	Certified units/sales
Argentina (CAPIF)	Platinum	40,000^{^}
Spain (Promusicae)	Gold	50,000^{^}
Sweden (GLF)	Platinum	80,000^{^}
United States (RIAA)	4× Platinum (Latin)	400,000^{^}
^{^} Shipments figures based on certification alone.

DVD

Region	Certification	Certified units/sales
Argentina (CAPIF)	Platinum	15,000^{^}
^{^} Shipments figures based on certification alone.

== Release history ==
Region	Date	Label	Format	Catalog
United States	February 27, 2001	Sony Discos	CD	LAK-84300/9-501938
United States	February 26, 2002	Sony Discos	DVD	LVD 84815
Hong Kong	February 28, 2001	Columbia	CD	5019382
Taiwan	March 1, 2001	Sony Music	CD	501938.2
Taiwan		Sony Music	DVD	201320.9
Japan	April 11, 2001	Epic Records	CD	ESCA-8299
Japan	May 9, 2002	Epic Records	DVD	EIBP-9
Argentina	2001	Sony Music	CD	2-501938
Argentina	October 23, 2002	Sony Music	DVD	9-201320
