= Entre el Amor y los Halagos =

Single by Ricky Martin

from the album Me Amaras
- Released: January 4, 1994
- Genre: Latin pop
- Length: 4:17
- Label: Sony Discos
- Songwriter: Juan Carlos Calderón
- Producer: Javier Del Moral

Ricky Martin singles chronology
"Que Dia Es Hoy" (1993)	"Entre el Amor y los Halagos" (1994)	"No Me Pidas Mas" (1994)

Audio
- "Ricky Martin - Entre El Amor Y Los Halagos (Audio)" on YouTube

"Entre el Amor y los Halagos" (English: "Between Love and Flattery") is the third single from Ricky Martin's second solo album Me Amaras. It was released on January 4, 1994.

The song reached number twelve on the Hot Latin Songs in the United States.

== Formats and track listings ==
Latin America promotional CD single

1. "Entre el Amor y los Halagos" – 4:17

Brazilian promotional 12" single

1. "Entre o Amor e o Carinho (Entre el Amor y los Halagos)" – 4:17

== Charts ==
Chart (1994)	Peak position
US Hot Latin Songs (Billboard)	12
