= Drop It on Me =

2006 single by Ricky Martin and Daddy Yankee

Single by Ricky Martin featuring Daddy Yankee

from the album Life
- Released: November 8, 2005
- Recorded: 2005
- Genre: Pop; reggaeton
- Length: 3:54
- Label: Columbia
- Songwriters: will.i.am; George Pajon Jr.; M. Smith; Ricky Martin; Daddy Yankee; Mohandas Dewese; M. Robinson; Francisco Saldana; Victor Cabrera; Toby Gad
- Producers: will.i.am; Luny Tunes

Ricky Martin singles chronology
| "I Don't Care" (2005) | "Drop It on Me" (2005) | "It's Alright" (2006) |

Audio
- "Drop It on Me (feat. Daddy Yankee, Debi Nova & Taboo) (audio)" on YouTube

"Drop It on Me" is a song recorded by the Puerto Rican singer Ricky Martin that was included on his tenth album, Life (2005). The single features Daddy Yankee.

== Background ==
This song is produced by will.i.am of The Black Eyed Peas and Luny Tunes. Martin performed it at the 2005 Victoria's Secret Fashion Show.

During his visit in Jordan in 2005, Martin recorded an Arabic/Spanglish version of "Drop It on Me" and "Enta Omri" with Arabic pop star Cheb Mami.

== Chart performance ==
It was the second US single, yet it failed to chart on the US Billboard Hot 100. It only peaked at number twenty on the Bubbling Under Hot 100 Singles and number twenty-three on the Latin Pop Songs.

== Formats and track listings ==
Japanese promotional CD single

1. "Drop It on Me" (featuring Daddy Yankee and Taboo of The Black Eyed Peas) – 3:54

US promotional CD single

1. "Drop It on Me" (featuring Daddy Yankee, Debi Nova & Taboo) – 3:54

== Charts ==
| Chart (2005–2006) | Peak position |
|---|---|
| Russia (Tophit) | 155 |
| US Bubbling Under Hot 100 (Billboard) | 20 |
| US Latin Pop Airplay (Billboard) | 23 |

== Release history ==
Release dates and formats for "Drop It on Me"
| Region | Date | Format | Label(s) | Ref. |
|---|---|---|---|---|
| United States | November 8, 2005 | Mainstream airplay | Columbia | |
