= Suzanne (VOF de Kunst song) =

1984 song by VOF de Kunst

Single by The Art Company
- Released: 1984
- Recorded: 1983
- Genre: Reggae pop
- Length: 4:41
- Label: CBS
- Songwriters: Caroline Bogman, Ferdi Lancee

"Suzanne" (titled as "Susanna" for the English version) is a single by Dutch band VOF de Kunst, also known as the Art Company, released in 1984.

The song reached number one on the Single Top 100 in the Netherlands, and No. 12 in the United Kingdom.

== Track listing ==
7" single

1. "Suzanne" – 4:41
2. "Het voordeel van de twijfel" – 3:32

== Charts ==
Chart (1983)	Peak position
Argentina (UPI)	1
Austria (Ö3 Austria Top 40)	2
Brazil (UPI)	3
Denmark (Hitlisten Danmark)	7
Dutch Single Top 100	1
El Salvador (UPI)	5
Finland (Suomen virallinen lista)	2
France (SNEP)	25
Ireland	3
Israel	1
Norway (VG-lista)	3
Paraguay (UPI)	2
South Africa (Springbok Radio)	6
Sweden (Sverigetopplistan)	4
Switzerland (Schweizer Hitparade)	6
UK Singles Chart	12
Uruguay (CUD)	1

== Ricky Martin version ==
"Susana"

Single by Ricky Martin

from the album Ricky Martin
- Released: August 15, 1992
- Recorded: 1991
- Genre: Latin pop
- Length: 4:54
- Label: Sony Discos
- Songwriters: Caroline Bogman, Ferdi Lancee, Mark Foggo
- Producer: Mariano Pérez

Ricky Martin singles chronology
"Dime Que Me Quieres" (1992)	"Susana" (1992)	"Todo Es Vida" (1993)

Audio
- "Ricky Martin - Susana (audio)" on YouTube

Ricky Martin recorded a Spanish-language version of "Suzanne", titled "Susana". It was included on his debut solo album Ricky Martin, and released as a single in 1992. A music video was also released.

=== Track listing ===
Latin America promotional 12" single

1. "Susana" – 4:54

=== Charts ===
Chart (1992)	Peak position
Mexico (Canciones que México canta)	10

== Other versions ==
In 1984, Kosovo-Albanian singer Naser Gjinovci from the band Minatori recorded an Albanian-language version of "Suzanne", called "Mihane".

In 1984, Adriano Celentano released the album I miei americani ("My Americans"), which consisted of Italian-language covers of mostly American hits, along with "Suzanne" by VOF de Kunst and "Michelle" by the Beatles.

In 1985, Tzimis Panousis, a Greek Alternative Rock-Singer and Comedian, released a comedy version of this song in Greek language. His version was not about a marred date, but a marred visit in the brothel.

In 1987, Americana Show, an Egyptian music group featuring Hisham Abbas, released an Arabic version of the song, retitled "Morgana" on their album, "Maganeen". Their version was not about the marred date of the original, but rather a retelling of the story of Ali Baba.

In 1997, Serbian singer Igor Starović from the band "Divlji kesten" recorded a Serbian-language version of "Suzanne", called "Suzana".

Colombian singer Luis Javier Piedrahita Gaviria (Fausto) recorded "Susana" in 1985 with Hispavox, which was popular in the eighties in Latin America.

The Tamil-language song "Oh Sona" from the Indian film Vaalee (1999) is unofficially based on "Suzanne".
