= Vuelo (song) =

Single by Ricky Martin

from the album Ricky Martin
- Released: March 30, 1992
- Recorded: 1991
- Genre: Latin pop · Latin ballad
- Length: 3:59
- Label: Sony Music Mexico · CBS Discos
- Songwriter: Fernando Riba · Kiko Campos
- Producer: Mariano Pérez Bautista

Ricky Martin singles chronology
"El Amor de Mi Vida" (1991)	"Vuelo" (1992)	"Dime Que Me Quieres" (1992)

Audio
- "Ricky Martin - Vuelo (Audio)" on YouTube

"Vuelo" (English: "Flight") is the third single from Ricky Martin's debut solo studio album Ricky Martin '91 (1991). It was released by Sony Music Mexico and CBS Discos on March 30, 1992 (see 1992 in music).

A music video was also released.

The song reached number eleven on the US Hot Latin Songs in the United States. It also reached number eight in Ecuador.

== Formats and track listings ==
Mexican promotional 12" single

1. "Vuelo" – 3:59

== Charts ==
Chart (1992)	Peak position
Ecuador (El Siglo de Torreón)	8
US Hot Latin Songs (Billboard)	11
