= El Amor de Mi Vida (song) =

Single by Ricky Martin

from the album Ricky Martin
- Released: February 25, 1992
- Recorded: 1991
- Genre: Latin pop
- Length: 4:56
- Label: Sony Discos
- Songwriter: Eddie Sierra
- Producer: Mariano Pérez

Ricky Martin singles chronology
"Fuego Contra Fuego" (1991)	"El Amor de Mi Vida" (1992)	"Vuelo" (1992)

Audio
- "Ricky Martin - El Amor de Mi Vida (Audio)" on YouTube

"El Amor de Mi Vida" (English: "The Love of My Life") is the second single from Ricky Martin's debut solo album Ricky Martin. It was released on February 25, 1992.

A music video was also released.

The song reached number eight on the Hot Latin Songs in the United States.

In 2001, "El Amor de Mi Vida" was re-recorded and included on Martin's greatest hits album La Historia. In 2008, it was also included on another compilation, called 17. The new version was produced by Danny López and Tommy Torres.

The original song was previously released by Eddie Sierra on his third album Esta Todo Bien (1990).

== Formats and track listings ==
Mexican promotional 12" single

1. "El Amor de Mi Vida" – 4:56

Brazilian promotional 12" single

1. "O Amor da Minha Vida (El Amor de Mi Vida)" – 4:23

== Charts ==
Chart (1992)	Peak position
US Hot Latin Songs (Billboard)	8
