= Fuego Contra Fuego =

Single by Ricky Martin

from the album Ricky Martin
- Released: September 9, 1991
- Recorded: 1990–1991
- Genre: Latin pop
- Length: 4:13
- Label: Sony Music Mexico; CBS Discos
- Songwriters: Mariano Pérez; Carlos Goméz
- Producer: Mariano Pérez

Ricky Martin singles chronology
"Fuego Contra Fuego" (1991)	"El Amor de Mi Vida" (1991)

Audio
- "Ricky Martin - Fuego Contra Fuego (Audio)" on YouTube

"Fuego Contra Fuego" (English: "Fire Against Fire") is the debut single by Puerto Rican singer Ricky Martin from his debut solo studio album Ricky Martin '91 (1991). It was released by Sony Music Mexico and CBS Discos on September 9, 1991 (see 1991 in music). A music video was also released.

The song reached number three on the Hot Latin Songs in the United States. It topped the charts in Uruguay, and reached the top-ten in Mexico, Ecuador, El Salvador and Panama.

In 2001, "Fuego Contra Fuego" was re-recorded and included on Martin's greatest hits album La Historia. In 2008, it was included on another compilation, called 17. The new version was produced by Tommy Torres and Danny López.

== Formats and track listings ==
Latin America 7" single

1. "Fuego Contra Fuego"
2. "Te Voy a Conquistar"

Latin America promotional 7" and 12" single

1. "Fuego Contra Fuego" – 4:13

Brazilian promotional 12" single

1. "Fogo Contra Fogo (Fuego Contra Fuego)"

2001 promotional CD single

1. "Fuego Contra Fuego" – 4:27

== Charts ==
=== Weekly charts ===
Chart (1991–1992)	Peak position
Ecuador (UPI)	9
El Salvador (UPI)	2
Mexico (AMPROFON)	2
Panama (UPI)	4
Uruguay (UPI)	1
US Hot Latin Songs (Billboard)	3

=== Year-end charts ===
Chart (1992)	Position
US Hot Latin Songs (Billboard)	22
