= Me Amaras (album) =

Studio album by Ricky Martin
- Released: April 13, 1993
- Recorded: 1992–1993
- Studio: Capitol Recording Studios; Ocean Way Recording Studios (Los Angeles, US); Conway Recording Studios (Hollywood, US); Sintonía Studio; Eurosonic Studio; Torresonido (Madrid, Spain); Winsonic Process Studios (West Hollywood, California, U.S.A.)
- Genre: Latin pop; dance-pop; pop rock
- Length: 39:50
- Label: Sony Discos; Columbia
- Producer: Juan Carlos Calderón

Ricky Martin chronology
Ricky Martin (1991)	Me Amaras (1993)	A Medio Vivir (1995)

Singles from Me Amaras
- 1. "Me Amaras" Released: February 15, 1993; 2. "Qué Día Es Hoy" Released: June 14, 1993; 3. "Entre el Amor y los Halagos" Released: November 8, 1993; 4. "No Me Pidas Más" Released: January 31, 1994

Professional ratings
Review scores
Source	Rating
AllMusic	2/5 stars

Me Amaras (English: You Will Love Me) is the second solo studio album recorded by Puerto Rican singer Ricky Martin, It was released by Sony Discos and Columbia Records on April 13, 1993.

== Writing and production ==
The album was produced by Juan Carlos Calderón wrote all the songs for this album, except for a Spanish version of Laura Branigan's song "Self Control" titled "Qué Día es Hoy", and a Spanish version of "Hooray! Hooray! It's a Holi-Holiday".

== Commercial performance ==
In the Billboard issue dated May 29, 1993, Me Amaras entered the Latin Pop Albums at number twenty-four. It peaked at number twenty-two four weeks later. According to different sources the album sold 700,000 copies or even 1,000,000 copies worldwide. It includes fourth Billboard Hot Latin Tracks hits: "Me Amaras", "Qué Día Es Hoy", "Entre el Amor y los Halagos" and "No Me Pidas Más". In Chile, three songs went Platinum.

== Track listing ==
All songs written and produced by Juan Carlos Calderón, except where noted

Me Amaras track listing
No.	Title	Length
1.	"No Me Pidas Más"	3:29
2.	"Es Mejor Decirse Adiós"	3:25
3.	"Entre el Amor y los Halagos"	4:18
4.	"Lo Qué Nos Pase, Pasará"	3:53
5.	"Ella Es"	4:42
6.	"Me Amaras"	4:29
7.	"Ayúdame"	4:11
8.	"Eres Como el Aire"	4:06
9.	"Qué Día Es Hoy" (Self Control) (writers: Giancarlo Bigazzi, Steve Piccolo, Raffaele Riefoli; adapt. Spanish: Mikel Herzog, Juan Carlos Calderón)	4:26
10.	"Hooray! Hooray! It's a Holi-Holiday" (writers: Frank Farian, Fred Jay; adapt. Spanish: Leo Napi Parnaspo)	3:11

== Charts ==
Chart performance for Me Amaras
Chart (1993)	Peak position
US Latin Pop Albums (Billboard)	22

== Certifications and sales ==
Certifications and sales for Me Amaras
Region	Certification	Certified units/sales
Chile	3× Platinum	
Summaries
Worldwide	—	700,000
