= I Don't Care (Ricky Martin song) =

Single by Ricky Martin featuring Fat Joe and Amerie or Debi Nova

from the album Life
- Released: September 13, 2005
- Genre: Crunk; hip hop; (English version); Reggaeton (Spanish version)
- Length: 3:48 (English version); 3:28 (Spanish version)
- Label: Columbia
- Songwriters: Sean Garrett; Scott Storch; Joseph Cartagena
- Producer: Storch

Ricky Martin singles chronology
"Y Todo Queda en Nada" (2003)	"I Don't Care" (2005)	"Drop It on Me" (2005)

Fat Joe singles chronology
"Get It Poppin'" (2005)	"I Don't Care" (2005)	"Make It Rain" (2006)

Amerie singles chronology
"Talkin' About" (2005)	"I Don't Care" (2005)	"Take Control" (2007)

Music videos
- "I Don't Care" on YouTube
- "Qué Más Da" on YouTube

"I Don't Care" is a song by Puerto Rican singer Ricky Martin from his eighth studio album, Life (2005). It was released on September 13, 2005, as the album's lead single. The original English version of the song features rapper Fat Joe and R&B singer Amerie, while its Spanish version, "Qué Más Da" ("Who Cares"), replaces Amerie's vocals with Debi Nova's. Martin performed "I Don't Care" at the 2006 Winter Olympics closing ceremony.

== Music video ==
The music videos for "I Don't Care" and "Qué Más Da" were filmed in Brooklyn, New York City, and directed by Diane Martel. The video for the English version features Fat Joe and Amerie, and the Spanish version features Fat Joe and Debi Nova. Both videos premiered simultaneously in September 2005.

== Chart performance ==
"I Don't Care" peaked at number 65 on the US Billboard Hot 100, thanks to its digital downloads (number 42 on the Hot Digital Songs). It was also well received on the Hot Dance Club Play, peaking at number three. It also peaked at number 49 on the US Pop 100 and "Qué Más Da" reached number seven on the Hot Latin Songs. As of January 2011, the song had sold 124,000 digital copies in the United States.

"I Don't Care" peaked at number six in Italy and number ten in Finland. Other peaks include number eleven in the United Kingdom, number sixteen in France, number twenty-one in Germany, and number twenty-five in Australia.

== Live performances ==
Martin delivered a performance of "I Don't Care" on the BBC's Top of the Pops on September 25, 2005.

== Track listings ==
- European CD single
1. "I Don't Care" (Single Version) – 3:52
2. "I Don't Care" (Luny Tunes Reggaeton Mix) – 3:23
- European CD maxi single
1. "I Don't Care" (Single Version) (featuring Fat Joe and Amerie) – 3:52
2. "Qué Más Da (I Don't Care)" (featuring Fat Joe) – 3:52
3. "I Don't Care" (Rishi Rich Remix) (featuring Amerie and Juggy D) – 4:09
4. "I Don't Care" (L.E.X. Reggaeton Mix) (featuring Fat Joe and Amerie) – 4:23
5. "I Don't Care" (L.E.X. Club Mix) (featuring Fat Joe and Amerie) – 9:18
6. "I Don't Care" (Ralphi and Craig's Club Radio Edit) (featuring Fat Joe and Amerie) – 3:36
- Australian CD maxi single
1. "I Don't Care" (Single Version) (featuring Fat Joe and Amerie) – 3:52
2. "Qué Más Da (I Don't Care)" (featuring Fat Joe) – 3:52
3. "I Don't Care" (Ralphi and Craig's Club Radio Edit) (featuring Fat Joe and Amerie) – 3:36
4. "I Don't Care" (L.E.X. Reggaeton Mix) (featuring Fat Joe and Amerie) – 4:23
5. "I Don't Care" (Rishi Rich Remix) (featuring Amerie and Juggy D) – 4:09

== Charts ==
=== Weekly charts ===
Weekly chart performance for "I Don't Care"
Chart (2005)	Peak position
Australia (ARIA)	25
Austria (Ö3 Austria Top 40)	45
Belgium (Ultratop 50 Flanders)	37
Belgium (Ultratop 50 Wallonia)	15
Europe (European Hot 100 Singles)	20
Finland (Suomen virallinen hittiälistalla)	30
France (SNEP)	16
Germany (GfK)	21
Greece (IFPI)	19
Hungary (Rádiós Top 40)	36
Ireland (IRMA)	20
Italy (FIMI)	6
Netherlands (Dutch Top 40)	25
Netherlands (Single Top 100)	20
Russia (Tophit)	150
Scotland Singles (OCC)	18
Sweden (Sverigetopplistan)	31
Switzerland (Schweizer Hitparade)	20
UK Singles (OCC)	11
US Billboard Hot 100	65
US Dance Club Songs (Billboard)	3
US Hot Latin Songs (Billboard) "Qué Más Da"	7
US Pop 100 (Billboard)	49
US Regional Mexican Airplay (Billboard) "Qué Más Da"	17
US Tropical Airplay (Billboard) "Qué Más Da"	8

=== Year-end charts ===
Year-end chart performance for "I Don't Care"
Chart (2005)	Position
Belgium (Ultratop 50 Wallonia)	86
