= Ricky Martin (1991 album) =

Studio album by Ricky Martin
- Released: November 26, 1991
- Recorded: 1990–1991
- Studios: Sonoland Studio; Circus Studio (Madrid, Spain); Roundhouse Studio (London, England, United Kingdom); Sony Music Studios (Mexico City, Mexico)
- Genres: Latin; Latin pop; dance-pop; pop rock
- Length: 43:34
- Labels: Sony Discos; Columbia
- Producers: Mariano Pérez Bautista · Luis de Llano Macedo (Exec.)

Ricky Martin chronology
Ricky Martin (1991)	Me Amarás (1993)

Singles from Ricky Martin (1991)
- 1. "Fuego Contra Fuego" Released: September 30, 1991; 2. "El Amor de Mi Vida" Released: February 24, 1992; 3. "Vuelo" Released: March 30, 1992; 4. "Dime Que Me Quieres" Released: May 4, 1992; 5. "Susana" Released: August 3, 1992

Professional ratings
Review scores
Source	Rating
AllMusic	3/5 stars

Ricky Martin is the debut solo studio album recorded by Puerto Rican artist Ricky Martin after previously departing from Puerto Rican boy band Menudo in July 1989, It was released by Sony Discos and Columbia Records on November 26, 1991.

== Commercial performance ==
Ricky Martin peaked at number five on the Latin Pop Albums in the US and sold over 500,000 copies worldwide. It was certified Gold in Mexico, Chile, Argentina, Colombia and Puerto Rico. The album includes Martin's first solo hits: "Fuego Contra Fuego," "El Amor de Mi Vida" and "Vuelo".

== Track listing ==
All songs produced by Mariano Pérez Bautista.

No.	Title	Writer(s)	Length
1.	"Fuego Contra Fuego"	Mariano Pérez; Carlos Gómez	4:16
2.	"Dime Que Me Quieres" (Bring a Little Lovin')	Harry Vanda · George Young; Adapt: Spanish: Mariano Pérez	3:16
3.	"Vuelo"	Fernando Riba; Kiko Campos	3:59
4.	"Conmigo Nadie Puede" (Comigo Ninguém Pôde)	Michael Sullivan · Paulo Massadas; Adapt: Spanish: Rodolfo Tovar	3:17
5.	"Te Voy a Conquistar" (Voy Te Conquistar)	Michael Sullivan · Paulo Massadas; Adapt: Karen Guindi	4:17
6.	"Juego de Ajedrez"	Manuel Pacho	3:08
7.	"Corazón Entre Nubes" (Coração Não Nuvems)	Carlos Colla · Marcos Valle; Adapt: Spanish: Karen Guindi	3:44
8.	"Ser Feliz"	Michael Sullivan · Paulo Massadas; Adapt: Spanish: Karen Guindi	4:40
9.	"El Amor de Mi Vida"	Eddie Sierra	4:57
10.	"Susana" (Suzanne)	Caroline Bogman · Ferdy Lancee · Mark Foggo; Adapt: Spanish: Rodolfo Tovar · Mariano Pérez	4:56
11.	"Popotitos"	Larry Williams	3:17
Total length:			43:34

== Charts ==
=== Weekly charts ===
Chart (1992)	Peak position
US Latin Pop Albums (Billboard)	5

=== Year-end charts ===
Chart (1992)	Position
US Latin Pop Albums (Billboard)	12

== Certifications and sales ==
Region	Certification	Certified units/sales
Argentina (CAPIF)	Gold	30,000^{^}
Chile	Gold	
Colombia (ASINCOL)	Gold	
Mexico (AMPROFON)	Gold	100,000^{^}
Puerto Rico	Gold	
Summaries
Worldwide	—	500,000
^{^} Shipments figures based on certification alone.

== See also ==
- 1991 in Latin music
- List of best-selling albums in Brazil
