= It's Alright (Ricky Martin song) =

Single by Ricky Martin

from the album Life
- Released: March 7, 2006
- Recorded: 2005
- Genre: Pop; R&B
- Length: 3:31
- Label: Columbia
- Songwriter(s): Danny López; Soraya; Javier García; George Pajon, Jr.
- Producer(s): Ricky Martin; Danny López; George Pajon, Jr.; will.i.am; George Noriega

Ricky Martin singles chronology
| "Drop It on Me" (2005) | "It's Alright" (2006) | "Tu Recuerdo" (2006) |

Audio
- "Ricky Martin - It's Alright (Audio)" on YouTube

Music video
- "Ricky Martin - Déjate Llevar (It's Alright - Spanish)" on YouTube

"It's Alright" is a song by Ricky Martin, released as the last single from his album Life on March 7, 2006. The Spanish version is called "Déjate Llevar" ("Indulge").

The original version of "It's Alright" contains Ricky Martin vocals only. In 2006, M. Pokora recorded additional vocals in French, and this new version was released as a single in Francophone countries. It was later included on the special edition of M. Pokora's Player album. It was one of the last songs written by singer-songwriter Soraya who died of a relapse of breast cancer later in 2006.

== Chart performance ==
"Déjate Llevar" peaked at number twenty-one on the Hot Latin Songs in the United States.

The solo version of "It's Alright" reached number seventeen in Finland and number sixty-nine on the Dutch Single Top 100.

The duet version of "It's Alright" with M. Pokora peaked at number four on the French Singles Chart and achieved Silver status for more than 111,200 copies sold. It reached also number eleven in Belgium Wallonia and number eighteen in Switzerland.

== Music video ==
Shot in New York City and in Puerto Rico by Liquid Films, the videos for the English and Spanish versions were directed by Simon Brand and produced by Betinna Abascal, Robert Feliciano and Robert Perkins. Maz Makhani was the director of photography. The videos aired in February 2006.

The Ricky Martin featuring M. Pokora live music video, directed by Gérard Pullicino, aired in April 2006.

== Formats and track listings ==
European CD single

1. "It's Alright" – 3:31
2. "Dejate Llevar" ("It's Alright" – Spanish) – 3:34

French CD maxi-single

1. "It's Alright" (duet with M. Pokora; radio edit) – 3:22
2. "It's Alright" (album version) – 3:31
3. "María" (Spanglish Extended Remix) – 7:56

== Charts and certifications ==
=== Weekly charts ===
Weekly chart performance for "It's Alright"
| Chart (2006) | Peak position |
|---|---|
| Belgium (Ultratip Bubbling Under Flanders) | 18 |
| Belgium (Ultratop 50 Wallonia) Ricky Martin & M. Pokora | 11 |
| Europe (European Hot 100 Singles) Ricky Martin & M. Pokora | 18 |
| Finland (Suomen virallinen lista) | 17 |
| France (SNEP) Ricky Martin & M. Pokora | 4 |
| Netherlands (Single Top 100) | 69 |
| Russia (Tophit) | 51 |
| Switzerland (Schweizer Hitparade) Ricky Martin & M. Pokora | 18 |
| US Hot Latin Songs (Billboard) "Déjate Llevar" | 21 |

=== Year-end charts ===
Year-end chart performance for "It's Alright"
| Chart (2006) | Position |
|---|---|
| Belgium (Ultratop 50 Wallonia) | 43 |
| France (SNEP) | 41 |

=== Certifications and sales ===
Certifications and sales for "It's Alright"
| Region | Certification | Certified units/sales |
|---|---|---|
| France (SNEP) | Silver | 100,000^{*} |
^{*} Sales figures based on certification alone.
