= Life (Ricky Martin album) =

Studio album by Ricky Martin
- Released: October 10, 2005
- Length: 46:44
- Languages: English; Spanish
- Label: Columbia
- Producers: George Noriega; Danny López; Ricky Martin; Randy Cantor; Scott Storch; Jon Secada; Sean Garrett; will.i.am; George Pajon; Luny Tunes; The Matrix

Ricky Martin chronology
Almas del Silencio (2003)	Life (2005)	MTV Unplugged (2006)

Singles from Life
- 1. "I Don't Care" Released: September 13, 2005; 2. "Drop It on Me" Released: November 8, 2005; 3. "It's Alright" Released: March 7, 2006

Life is the eighth studio album and third English album recorded by Puerto Rican performer Ricky Martin. It was released by Columbia Records on October 10, 2005, in Europe, October 11, 2005, in the United States and October 19, 2005, in Japan.

== Promotion ==
"I Don't Care," produced by Scott Storch and featuring guest vocals from rapper Fat Joe and R&B singer Amerie, was issued as the album's lead single. It peaked at number sixty-five on the US Billboard Hot 100, and reached number three on the Hot Dance Club Songs chart. The Spanish-language version, called "Qué Más Da" peaked at number seven on Billboard's Hot Latin Songs. "I Don't Care" reached also top ten in Italy and Finland. In the United Kingdom, it peaked at number eleven. Life's second international single, "It's Alright" became a hit in Europe, after it was re-recorded as duet with singer M. Pokora. It peaked at number four on the French Singles Chart and was eventually certified Silver by the National Syndicate of Phonographic Publishing (SNEP).

== Critical reception ==
Professional ratings
Review scores
Source	Rating
About.com	4/5 stars
AllMusic	3.5/5 stars
The Denver Post	3.5/5 stars
Newsday	B+
Rolling Stone	2/5 stars
Slant Magazine	2.5/5 stars

AllMusic editor Stephen Thomas Erlewine called Life a "livelier, better record than Sound Loaded, but he never once sounds as assured as he did on his 1999 breakthrough [...] On Lfe, you can hear him struggle with what he should do and who he should be. Sometimes he struggles and succeeds, which is enough to make it worth a listen – and it might even score him a hit or two – but that palpable sense of exertion means this isn't quite the comeback or makeover it was clearly meant to be." Billboard remarked that Life "grows on you while managing to be entirely entertaining. If some of it does not sound like Martin, it is because his singing is often too far back in the mix, a mistake for a voice that is so distinctive, if not extraordinary."

Rolling Stone's Barry Walters found that the album "aims to update the singer's hyperactive pop with trendy reggaeton rhythms, but the result is a scattered mess that spews indiscriminate polish and calculated grit over hackneyed material [...] Mixing bombastic rock, cornball dance cuts and crocodile-tears-dripping ballads, Life seems destined for a speedy death." Sal Cinquemani, writing for Slant Magazine, found that the album "gets off to a remarkably slow start" and had Maritn "struggling with an identity crisis similar to that of George Michael in the early '90s," with "none of these songs" coming "close" to his previous songs. Tijana Ilich from About.com felt that Life was "not a bad CD. It just tries to be something for everyone, and doesn't quite pull it off."

== Commercial performance ==
Life debuted at number six on the US Billboard 200, with nearly 73,000 copies sold. It also reached the top ten in Argentina, Mexico, and Spain, while also peaking within the top 20 in Italy and Switzerland. In the United Kingdom, the album peaked at number forty. The album was later certified Gold in Argentina and Mexico. In January 2011, Billboard reported that it had sold 274,000 copies in the United States, according to Nielsen SoundScan. By November 2006, Life had sold 694,000 copies worldwide.

== Copy protection controversy ==
In the fall of 2005, the album appeared on a list of the 52 CD releases from Sony BMG that were identified as having been shipped with the controversial Extended Copy Protection (XCP) computer software, which, in addition to preventing a copy of the disc from being made, was identified by many security software vendors as having also reported the users' listening habits back to Sony and also exposed any Microsoft Windows computer known to have the CD inserted to malicious attacks that exploited insecure features of the rootkit software. Sony discontinued use of the technology on November 11, 2005, and recalled this and other titles affected by XCP, and asked customers to submit copies affected by the software to the company so that it could replace them with copies that did not contain the software.

== Track listing ==
Life track listing
No.	Title	Writer(s)	Producer(s)	Length
1.	"Til I Get to You"	Ricky Martin; George Noriega; Danny López; Itaal Shur	Martin; Noriega; López; Randy Cantor^{[a]}	4:56
2.	"I Won't Desert You"	Martin; Noriega; López; Cantor; Kara DioGuardi	Martin; Noriega; López; Cantor	3:50
3.	"I Don't Care" (featuring Fat Joe and Amerie)	Sean Garrett; Scott Storch; Joseph Cartagena	Storch; Garrett^{[b]}	3:48
4.	"Stop Time Tonight"	Diane Warren	Martin; Noriega; López; Jon Secada^{[c]}	4:00
5.	"Life"	Martin; Noriega; López	Martin; Noriega; López	4:07
6.	"I Am" (featuring Voltio)	Martin; Garrett; Julio Voltio	Garrett	3:31
7.	"It's Alright"	López; Soraya Lamilla; Javier García; George Pajon, Jr.	Martin; López; Pajon, Jr.; will.i.am; Noriega^{[b]}	3:31
8.	"Drop It on Me" (featuring Daddy Yankee)	Martin; will.i.am; Francisco Saldaña; Victor Cabrera; Pajon, Jr.; Toby Gad; Melanie Smith; Ramón Ayala; Mohandas Dewese; Bobby Robinson	will.i.am; Luny Tunes^{[a]}; López^{[b]}; David Cabrera^{[b]}	3:54
9.	"This Is Good"	Martin; Noriega; López; Lauren Christy; Graham Edwards; Scott Spock; Storch	Martin; Noriega; López; The Matrix; Storch	3:35
10.	"Save the Dance"	Martin; Noriega; López; Billy Mann	Martin; Noriega; López; Mann^{[b]}	4:05
11.	"Qué Más Da" (I Don't Care) (Luny Tunes Reggaeton Mix) (featuring Fat Joe and Debi Nova)	Garrett; Storch; Cartagena; Claudia Brant	Storch; Garrett^{[b]}; Noriega^{[b]}; Luny Tunes^{[d]}	3:29
12.	"Déjate Llevar" (It's Alright – Spanish)	López; Lamilla; García; Pajon, Jr.	López; Pajon, Jr.; will.i.am; Noriega^{[b]}	3:34

iTunes bonus track
No.	Title	Writer(s)	Producer(s)	Length
13.	"Sleep Tight"	Martin; Noriega; López; Christy; Edwards; Spock	Martin; Noriega; López; The Matrix	3:52

French re-release bonus track
No.	Title	Writer(s)	Producer(s)	Length
13.	"It's Alright" (featuring M. Pokora)	López; Lamilla; García; Pajon, Jr.	Martin; López; Pajon, Jr.; will.i.am; Noriega^{[b]}; 6Mondini^{[d]}	3:22

Notes

- ^{^a} signifies a co-producer
- ^{^b} signifies a vocal producer
- ^{^c} signifies a background vocal producer
- ^{^d} signifies a remix producer

== Charts ==
Chart performance for Life
Chart (2005)	Peak position
Argentinian Albums (CAPIF)	6
Australian Albums (ARIA)	44
Austrian Albums (Ö3 Austria)	60
Belgian Albums (Ultratop Wallonia)	47
Dutch Albums (Album Top 100)	26
European Albums (Top 100)	31
Finnish Albums (Suomen virallinen lista)	34
French Albums (SNEP)	61
German Albums (Offizielle Top 100)	57
Italian Albums (FIMI)	14
Japanese Albums (Oricon)	121
Mexican Albums (AMPROFON)	5
Scottish Albums (Official Charts)	61
Spanish Albums (Promusicae)	8
Swedish Albums (Sverigetopplistan)	34
Swiss Albums (Schweizer Hitparade)	17
UK Albums (Official Charts)	40
US Billboard 200	6

== Certifications and sales ==
Certifications and sales for Life
Region	Certification	Certified units/sales
Argentina (CAPIF)	Gold	20,000^{^}
France	—	73,000
Mexico (AMPROFON)	Gold	50,000^{^}
South Korea (RIAK)	—	3,474
United States	—	274,000
^{^} Shipments figures based on certification alone.

== Release history ==
Release history and formats for Life
Region	Date	Label	Format	Catalog
Europe	October 10, 2005	Columbia	CD	5205492
North America	October 11, 2005	Columbia	CD	5205492
Australia	October 16, 2005	Columbia	CD	82876733822
Japan	October 19, 2005	Sony Music Japan	CD	SICP-918
