= Vida (Draco Rosa album) =

2013 studio album by Draco Rosa

Studio album by Draco Rosa
- Released: March 19, 2013
- Recorded: 2012; Los Angeles
- Genres: Rock en español, Latin pop, alternative rock, indie rock
- Length: 61:23
- Language: Spanish
- Label: Sony Music Latin
- Producers: Draco Rosa, George Noriega

Draco Rosa chronology
| La Pena Negra (2011) | Vida (2013) | Monte Sagrado (2018) |

Alternative cover
- CD/DVD Special Edition

Singles from Vida
- 1. "Más y Más" Released: January 6, 2013; 2. "Esto Es Vida" Released: June 25, 2013

Professional ratings
Review scores
| Source | Rating |
|---|---|
| AllMusic | link |

Vida (Life) is the twelfth studio album by Puerto Rican recording artist Draco Rosa, released on March 19, 2013 by Sony Music Latin. It consists of 16 duets of Rosa's hits featuring guest artists chosen personally by Rosa himself. This is the first album released by Draco after his non-hodgkin lymphoma cancer diagnosis near his liver on April 25, 2011. It is entitled Vida symbolizing Draco's recovery after his cancer treatment. The album won Album of the Year at the 2013 Latin Grammy Awards and Best Latin Pop Album at the 56th Annual Grammy Awards.

== Background ==
On April 25, 2011, Draco Rosa was diagnosed with cancer near his liver. While undergoing treatment, Rosa announced in December 2011 that he was preparing a new album that would feature collaborations with Latin music artists such as Alejandro Sanz, Juan Luis Guerra, Enrique Bunbury, and Calle 13. One of the most notable artists he selected for his album was fellow ex-Menudo member and long-time friend Ricky Martin. In September 2012, he confirmed the title of album Vida which features various Latin artists performing duets with him with songs from his music career. The songs he picked for the record were inspirational tracks about life.

== Duets ==
The first track "Esto Es Vida" features Dominican singer-songwriter Juan Luis Guerra which Rosa first recorded for his album Amor Vincit Omnia (2009). Four other songs from the album: "El Tiempo Va", "Obra de Arte", "Paraíso Prometido (Hay Que Llegar)" and "Reza Por Mí", features Rubén Blades, Enrique Bunbury, Marc Anthony, and Romeo Santos, respectively. With no direct promotion for the duet with Ednita Nazario, "Amantes Hasta El Fin" entered the Billboard's Latin Airplay chart in November 2014 with 3.2 million audience impressions, according to Nielsen, after over a year and a half since the release of the album.

== Release ==
On October 16, 2012, Draco's manager and friend Angelo Medina announced that the album's release date had been pushed back from November 13, 2012 to February 2013 due to Rosa entering quarantine after a bone marrow transplant months before. After completing his quarantine on December 31, 2012, Draco was declared cancer-free. A final statement was released on January 10, 2013, announcing that the official release date of Vida had been pushed back an additional month, for March 19, 2013.

In an interview with Draco, he said: "For me this album's been a wonderful experience. In difficult times, the music, the love and support of the public and all partners involved in this project has been a source of life and inspiration. It was intense working hours at complex moments with very much solidarity, emotion and hope. I'm really excited and grateful to everyone who helped make this dream possible. For me, this album's been a wonderful experience. Music in difficult times, the love and support of the public and all partners involved in this project has been an inspiration and source of life".

Sony Music Latin issued a statement on March 12, 2013, announcing that Vida was to be released in Spain on April 9. The statement also included the official track list of the album.

Vida was recorded in Spain, England, Mexico, Argentina, United States and Puerto Rico.

== Track listing ==
On May 11, 2012, the full set of collaborations was released to the press and on March 12, 2013, the official track list order was released, a week before the album's release.

| No. | Title | Writer(s) | Original album | Length |
|---|---|---|---|---|
| 1. | "Esto Es Vida" (feat. Juan Luis Guerra) | Draco Cornelius Rosa, Luis Gómez-Escolar | Amor Vincit Omnia | 4:32 |
| 2. | "Penélope" (feat. Maná) | Rosa, José Manuel Navarro | Vagabundo | 3:57 |
| 3. | "Como Me Acuerdo" (feat. Alejandro Sanz) | Rosa, George Noriega, Gómez-Escolar | Mad Love | 3:05 |
| 4. | "El Tiempo Va" (feat. Rubén Blades) | Rosa, Gómez-Escolar | Amor Vincit Omnia | 3:45 |
| 5. | "Obra de Arte" (feat. Enrique Bunbury) | Rosa, Escolar | Amor Vincit Omnia | 3:44 |
| 6. | "Blanca Mujer" (feat. Shakira) | Rosa, Escolar | Vagabundo | 4:02 |
| 7. | "Más y Más" (feat. Ricky Martin) | Rosa, Itaal Shur, Escolar | Mad Love | 3:22 |
| 8. | "Noche Fría" (feat. MiMA) | Rosa, Walter Afanasieff, Escolar | Mad Love | 4:32 |
| 9. | "Vagabundo" (feat. Andrés Calamaro) | Rosa, Navarro | Vagabundo | 3:26 |
| 10. | "Roto Por Ti" (feat. Juanes) | Rosa, Noriega, Escolar | Vino | 3:35 |
| 11. | "Paraíso Prometido (Hay Que Llegar)" (feat. Marc Anthony) | Rosa, Escolar | Amor Vincit Omnia | 4:43 |
| 12. | "Reza Por Mí" (feat. Romeo Santos) | Rosa, Escolar | Amor Vincit Omnia | 4:39 |
| 13. | "Cruzando Puertas" (feat. José Feliciano) | Rosa, Escolar | Frío | 4:34 |
| 14. | "Amantes Hasta el Fin" (feat. Ednita Nazario) | Rosa, Navarro | Vagabundo | 3:57 |
| 15. | "Gracias Brujería" (feat. Tego Calderón) | Rosa, Escolar, Calderón | Vagabundo | 2:52 |
| 16. | "Madre Tierra" (feat. René Pérez from Calle 13) | Rosa, Escolar | Vagabundo | 3:38 |
| Total length: | | | | 61:23 |

Walmart Bonus Track Exclusive
| No. | Title | Writer(s) | Length |
|---|---|---|---|
| 17. | "Más y Más" (Obscure Version) | Rosa, Shur, Escolar | 3:32 |
| Total length: | | | 64:55 |

Esto Es + Vida (CD/DVD Special Edition) Bonus DVD
| No. | Title | Length |
|---|---|---|
| 1. | "Blanca Mujer" (Live Version) |
| 2. | "Esto Es Vida" (Live Version) |
| 3. | "Penélope" (Live Version) |
| 4. | "Quiero Vivir" (Live Version) |
| 5. | "Reza Por Mí" (Live Version) |
| 6. | "Más y Más" (Obscure Version) |
| 7. | "Esto Es Vida" (feat. Juan Luis Guerra) |

== Promotion ==
=== In-stores and TV appearances ===
Draco held a five-day in-store tour throughout Puerto Rico, March 20–24, 2013, in Cantón Mall in Bayamón, Mayagüez, Caguas, Hatillo and Plaza Las Américas in Hato Rey. Draco later promoted Vida in Chicago with in-stores, and television interviews where he expressed his gratitude to the fans for making the album number one in Billboard's Top Latin Albums. Rosa continued to promote the album in Miami as well, where he performed at the 2013 Billboard Latin Music Awards with Maná.

=== Live performances ===
The first live performance of the album took place on February 21, 2013 at Premios Lo Nuestro, held at the American Airlines Arena, where Draco and Ricky Martin performed their single "Más y Más", their first public performance together since they were both in Menudo. They performed the single again at the 2013 Latin Grammy Awards, held at the Mandalay Bay Events Center on November 21, 2013. Draco and Mexican band Maná performed "Penélope" at the 2013 Billboard Latin Music Awards, held at the BankUnited Center on April 25, 2013.

=== Music videos ===
As part of the new projects, Draco and Ricky participated together in the recording of the single's music video in New York under the direction of Carlos Pérez. On January 14, 2013 Ricky Martin tweeted a photo of him and Draco with the caption "At the music video shoot of #MasYMas with my brother @dracorosa. #Vida". The music video was released on Draco's YouTube channel on February 13, 2013. The music video for the obscure version of "Más y Más" was filmed at Phantom Vox Studios in Los Angeles in front of a small but intimate public and directed by Angela Alvarado, then-wife of Draco. After making a special appearance at Alejandro Sanz's concert in Puerto Rico on May 12, 2013, in which they sang their duet of "Como Me Acuerdo", Draco and Sanz's performance was filmed and used for its music video released on October 21, 2013, but was removed from YouTube the same day.

After making his first ever appearance at the Puerto Rican Day Parade on June 9, 2013 and performing at the Copacabana in Times Square on May 11, 2013, Draco confirmed that he will film the music video for duet of "Esto Es Vida" with Juan Luis Guerra in the Dominican Republic which he appraised during his illness as one of his "best compositions". "It was a strong moment in my life. They're important parts with serious people, important", he expressed. Filming took place on June 17, 2013 at the ruins of the Engombe Sugar Mill in Santo Domingo. The video was directed by Guerra's own son, filmmaker Jean Gabriel Guerra and released on August 14, 2013.

== Singles ==
- "Más y Más": the album's first lead single, released on January 6, 2013. The highly anticipated duet between Draco Rosa and fellow ex-Menudo member and long-time friend Ricky Martin on "Más y Más" was released on iTunes weeks after Draco's quarantine expired and was declared cancer-free on December 31, 2012. "After so many years of writing and doing projects together, I felt that the right right thing was this should be the first single. Ricky is one of the main artists with whom I've worked with, so it was a great idea to do such a pretty duet. It's that kind of things that are destined to happen", said Draco. Although both artists have not seen each other in person for many years, Draco said Ricky was one of the many friends who gave him support in one of the most difficult stages of his cancer treatment. An urban version of the single was released exclusively on iTunes on February 25, 2013. Also an obscure version, which is only available in the Walmart Exclusive Bonus Track version of Vida. Promotion for this single and its music video was released on May 3, 2013.
- "Esto Es Vida": on June 9, 2013, during the Puerto Rican Day Parade, Draco confirmed that his duet of "Esto Es Vida" with Dominican singer-songwriter Juan Luis Guerra will be the album's second single with its release taking place on June 25, 2013. The music video was filmed just a few days later in Santo Domingo. A bachata version of the duet was released on September 30, 2014.

=== Promotional singles ===
| Single | Featured artist | Release date |
|---|---|---|
| "Penélope" | Maná | September 17, 2012 |
| "Blanca Mujer" | Shakira | February 4, 2013 |
| "Reza Por Mí" | Romeo Santos | February 8, 2013 |
| "Paraíso Prometido" | Marc Anthony | March 4, 2013 |

== Personnel ==
- Marc Anthony – vocals
- Rubén Blades – vocals
- Enrique Bunbury – vocals, guitar
- Andrés Calamaro – vocals, guitar
- Tego Calderón – composer, vocals
- Dave Clauss – engineer
- Luis Gómez-Escolar – composer
- Benny Faccone – mixing
- José Feliciano – vocals, guitar
- Juan Luis Guerra – vocals, guitar
- Seth Atkins Horan – engineer
- Nelson "Gazu" Jaime – engineer
- Juanes – vocals
- Allan Leschhorn – engineer
- Bob Ludwig – mastering
- Maná – vocals, guitar, bass, drums
- Ricky Martin – vocals
- MiMA – vocals
- Ednita Nazario – vocals
- George Noriega – producer
- René Pérez – vocals
- Fernando Quintana – engineer
- Draco Rosa – composer, vocals, producer
- Romeo Santos – vocals
- Alejandro Sanz – vocals
- Fabián Serrano – engineer
- Shakira – vocals
- Itaal Shur – composer
- Sadaharu Yagi – engineer

== Concerts ==
=== Encuentro ===
On January 28, 2012, Draco made a comeback to the public eye after his long absence due to cancer treatment to announce a concert with Juan Luis Guerra and Rubén Blades. The concert took place on March 30, 2012 at the José Miguel Agrelot Coliseum. The concert was named "Encuentro" after the Banco Popular Christmas musical special of the same name that they starred and performed in 2002, nearly a decade prior. Angelo Medina, producer of the event, announced on February 24, 2012, that the concert was quickly sold-out and a second concert was added for March 31, 2013. Both concerts premiered two of the 16 tracks of Draco's Vida album. Guerra joined Draco in "Esto Es Vida" and then Blades with "El Tiempo Va" alongside Draco.

=== Draco & Friends ===
Draco returned to the stage on December 6, 2013 at the José Miguel Agrelot Coliseum with a concert entitled "Draco & Friends". Many artists who collaborated on Vida performed alongside Draco, including Juan Luis Guerra, Enrique Bunbury, Calle 13's René Pérez, Juanes and Ricky Martin. Draco announced that due to overwhelming demand, a second concert date was added for December 7, 2013, which featured other guest artists.

== Awards ==
| Year | Award | Category | Nominated work | Result |
|---|---|---|---|---|
| 2013 | Latin Grammy Awards | Record of the Year | "Más y Más" (feat. Ricky Martin) | Nominated |
| 2013 | Latin Grammy Awards | Album of the Year | Vida | Won |
| 2013 | Latin Grammy Awards | Best Contemporary Pop Vocal Album | Vida | Nominated |
| 2013 | Premios Juventud | La Combinación Perfecta | "Más y Más" (feat. Ricky Martin) | Nominated |
| 2013 | Premios Juventud | Mi Video Favorito | "Más y Más" (feat. Ricky Martin) | Nominated |
| 2014 | Grammy Awards | Best Latin Pop Album | Vida | Won |

== Chart performance ==
=== Weekly charts ===
| Chart (2013) | Peak position |
|---|---|
| US Billboard 200 | 30 |
| US Top Latin Albums (Billboard) | 1 |
| US Latin Pop Albums (Billboard) | 1 |

== Album certification ==
| Region | Certification | Certified units/sales |
|---|---|---|
| United States (RIAA) | Gold (Latin) | 30,000^{^} |
^{^} Shipments figures based on certification alone.
