= Amor (Ricky Martin song) =

2001 single by Ricky Martin

Single by Ricky Martin

from the album The Best of Ricky Martin and Sound Loaded
- Language: English; Spanish
- Released: November 26, 2001
- Recorded: 2000
- Genre: salsa; Latin rock; Latin pop
- Length: 3:27
- Label: Columbia
- Songwriter(s): Draco Rosa; Randall Barlow; Liza Quintana
- Producer(s): Emilio Estefan; Draco Rosa; Randall Barlow; Jonathan Peters; Tony Coluccio

Ricky Martin singles chronology
"Loaded" (2001)	"Amor" (2001)	"Come to Me" (2002)

Audio
- "Ricky Martin - Amor (audio)" on YouTube

"Amor" (English: "Love") is the first English-language single from Ricky Martin's greatest hits album, The Best of Ricky Martin (2001). Originally, the song was included on the 2000 album, Sound Loaded. The Best of Ricky Martin contains two remixes of "Amor", by Salaam Remi and Jonathan Peters.

"Amor" was released on November 26, 2001, in selected European countries.

The song reached number 82 in Switzerland in December 2001.

== Formats and track listings ==
European CD single

1. "Amor" (Salaam Remi's Chameleon Remix) – 3:25
2. "Amor" (Jonathan Peters' Remix) – 3:34

European CD and 12" maxi-single

1. "Amor" (Salaam Remi's Chameleon Remix) – 3:25
2. "Amor" (Jonathan Peters' Remix) – 3:34
3. "Amor" (Album Version) – 3:27
4. "Megamix by Jonathan Peters" ("María/Livin' la Vida Loca/The Cup of Life/She Bangs") – 4:16

== Charts ==
Chart performance for "Amor"
Chart (2001)	Peak position
Switzerland (Schweizer Hitparade)	82
