= Teatro (Draco Rosa album) =

Live album by Draco Rosa
- Released: September 23, 2008
- Genre: Latin pop, Latin rock

Draco Rosa chronology
Vino (2008)	Teatro (2008)	Amor Vincit Omnia (2009)

Teatro is the 2nd live album recorded by Puerto Rican singer Draco Rosa released on September 23, 2008. The album won the Latin Grammy Award for Best Rock Solo Vocal Album.

== Track listing ==
No.	Title	Length
1.	"Intro (Bosque de los Numeros)"	2:26
2.	"Divididos"	3:08
3.	"Bosque de los Numeros"	1:44
4.	"Madre"	3:43
5.	"Todo Es Vino"	4:23
6.	"Roadhouse Blues"	4:27
7.	"Livin la Vida Loca"	4:08
8.	"Penelope"	4:02
9.	"Blanca Mujer"	4:03
10.	"Cruzando Puertas"	3:49
11.	"Para No Olividar"	4:51
12.	"Tu Tren Se Va"	3:18
13.	"Brujeria"	3:58
