= The Best of Ricky Martin =

Greatest hits album by Ricky Martin
- Released: October 30, 2001
- Recorded: 1995–2001
- Genre: Pop; dance-pop
- Length: 56:59
- Language: English
- Label: Columbia

Ricky Martin compilations chronology
La Historia (2001)	The Best of Ricky Martin (2001)	Almas del Silencio (2003)

Singles from The Best of Ricky Martin
- 1. "Amor" Released: November 26, 2001; 2. "Come to Me" Released: March 4, 2002

Professional ratings
Review scores
Source	Rating
AllMusic	4/5 stars

The Best of Ricky Martin is the second compilation album by the Puerto Rican singer Ricky Martin released by Columbia Records on October 30, 2001.

== Commercial performance ==
The Best of Ricky Martin did not include any new material. The remixes of "Amor" were sent to radio stations in selected countries, to promote the album. The Best of Ricky Martin was not released in the United States.

The album peaked at number seven in Denmark, number twelve in the Netherlands and Italy, number seventeen in Finland, and number twenty-five in Australia. In the United Kingdom it reached number forty-two.

The Best of Ricky Martin was certified Platinum in Australia, and Gold in the United Kingdom and Finland. In the UK, the album has sold 177,064 copies.

== Track listing ==
The Best of Ricky Martin track listing
No.	Title	Writer(s)	Producer(s)	Length
1.	"Livin' la Vida Loca"	Robi Rosa; Desmond Child	Child; Rosa	4:03
2.	"María" (Pablo Flores Spanglish Radio Edit)	Rosa; Luis Gómez-Escolar; K. C. Porter	Porter; Rosa; Pablo Flores; Javier Garza	4:30
3.	"She Bangs"	Rosa; Walter Afanasieff; Child	Rosa; Afanasieff; Child	4:40
4.	"Private Emotion" (with Meja)	Eric Bazilian; Rob Hyman	Child; Rosa	4:01
5.	"Amor" (New Remix by Salaam Remi)	Rosa; Randall Barlow; Liza Quintana	Rosa; Barlow; Emilio Estefan Jr.; Salaam "The Chameleon" Remi	3:25
6.	"The Cup of Life" (Original English Version)	Rosa; Child; Gómez-Escolar	Rosa; Child	4:34
7.	"Nobody Wants to Be Lonely" (with Christina Aguilera)	Child; Victoria Shaw; Gary Burr	Afanasieff	4:11
8.	"Spanish Eyes/Lola, Lola" (Music from One Night Only video)	Rosa; Child; Gómez-Escolar; Porter	Child; Rosa; Porter	5:44
9.	"She's All I Ever Had"	Rosa; George Noriega; Jon Secada	Secada; Noriega; Rosa; Estefan Jr.; Afanasieff	4:55
10.	"Come to Me"	Rosa; David Resnik; James Goodwin	Noriega; Estefan Jr.	4:33
11.	"Amor" (New Remix by Jonathan Peters)	Rosa; Barlow; Quintana	Rosa; Barlow; Estefan Jr.; Jonathan Peters; Tony Coluccio	3:34
12.	"Loaded" (George Noriega Radio Edit)	Rosa; Noriega; Secada	Rosa; Noriega; Estefan Jr.	3:49
13.	"Shake Your Bon-Bon"	Rosa; Noriega; Child	Noriega; Rosa; Estefan Jr.	3:12
14.	"Be Careful (Cuidado Con Mi Corazón)" (with Madonna)	Madonna; William Orbit	Madonna; Orbit	4:02

Japanese bonus track
No.	Title	Length
15.	"Megamix by Jonathan Peters" (María/Livin' la Vida Loca/The Cup of Life/She Bangs)	4:16

Limited edition bonus VCD: MTV presents Ricky Martin "Live and Loaded"
No.	Title	Length
1.	"Fanatic: Ricky Meets and Greets"
2.	"She Bangs"
3.	"Loaded"
4.	"Livin' la Vida Loca"
5.	"María"
6.	"La Copa de la Vida" (Spanglish version)

== Charts ==
=== Weekly charts ===
Weekly chart performance for The Best of Ricky Martin
Chart (2001)	Peak position
Australian Albums (ARIA)	25
Austrian Albums (Ö3 Austria)	39
Belgian Albums (Ultratop Flanders)	48
Danish Albums (Hitlisten)	7
Dutch Albums (Album Top 100)	12
European Albums (Top 100)	38
Finnish Albums (Suomen virallinen lista)	17
German Albums (Offizielle Top 100)	29
Irish Albums (IRMA)	57
Italian Albums (FIMI)	12
Japanese Albums (Oricon)	50
Scottish Albums (OCC)	44
Swiss Albums (Schweizer Hitparade)	26
UK Albums (OCC)	42

=== Year-end charts ===
Year-end chart performance for The Best of Ricky Martin
Chart (2001)	Position
Danish Albums (Hitlisten)	47
UK Albums (OCC)	141

== Certifications and sales ==
Certifications and sales for The Best of Ricky Martin
Region	Certification	Certified units/sales
Australia (ARIA)	Platinum	70,000^{^}
Denmark (IFPI Danmark)	Gold	25,000^{^}
Finland (Musiikkituottajat)	Gold	15,726
South Korea (RIAK)	—	19,881
United Kingdom (BPI)	Gold	177,064
^{^} Shipments figures based on certification alone.

== Release history ==
Release history and formats for The Best of Ricky Martin
Region	Date	Label	Format	Catalog
Japan	November 14, 2001	Epic Records Int'l	CD	EICP-15
Japan	December 21, 2016	Epic Records Int'l	CD	SICP-5225
Japan	March 13, 2019	Epic Records Int'l	CD	SICP-6055
