= Teatro =

Teatro may refer to:

- Theatre
- Teatro (band), musical act signed to Sony BMG
- Teatro (Willie Nelson album), 1998
- Teatro (Draco Rosa album), 2008
