= Come to Me (Ricky Martin song) =

Single by Ricky Martin

from the album Sound Loaded and The Best of Ricky Martin
- Released: March 4, 2002
- Recorded: 2000
- Genre: Latin pop
- Length: 4:33
- Label: Columbia
- Songwriter(s): Draco Rosa; David Resnik; James Goodwin
- Producer(s): Emilio Estefan; George Noriega

Ricky Martin singles chronology
"Amor" (2001)	"Come to Me" (2002)	"Relight My Fire" (2003)

Audio
- "Ricky Martin - Come to Me (audio)" on YouTube

"Come to Me" is the second single from Ricky Martin's greatest hits album, The Best of Ricky Martin (2001). Originally, the song was included on the 2000 album, Sound Loaded.

"Come to Me" was released on March 4, 2002 in selected European countries.

The song reached number ninety-two in the Netherlands in March 2002.

Sound Loaded also includes the Spanish-language version of "Come to Me", titled "Ven a Mí."

== Formats and track listings ==
European CD single

1. "Come to Me" – 4:33
2. "Livin' la Vida Loca" – 4:03

== Charts ==
Chart (2002)	Peak position
Netherlands (Single Top 100)	92
