= Sadaharu Yagi =

Japanese musician

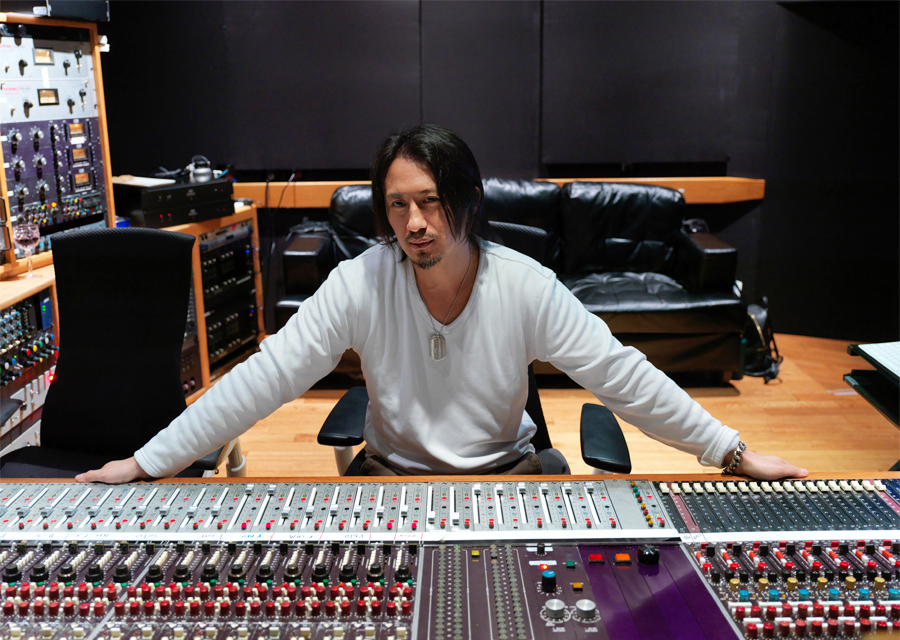

Background information
- Born: Kitakyushu, Japan
- Genres: Pop rock, Alternative, Latin
- Occupations: Producer, Recording engineer, Mixing engineer
- Labels: Sadasound Productions
- Website: www.sadasound.com

Sadaharu Yagi is a Japanese-born record producer, mixing engineer, and recording engineer who has won one Grammy and two Latin Grammy Awards. He has worked with artists like Shania Twain, John Mayall, and Marc Anthony. Currently he is based in Los Angeles, California.

== Biography ==
Yagi was born in Kitakyushu, Japan, and graduated from Kyushu University (former Kyushu Institute of Design). After graduation, he began working in the recording industry in Los Angeles. In 2013, he was awarded a Latin Grammy for his work on Draco Rosa's album, Vida, which also won at the Grammy Awards in 2014. He was also part of Sara Bareilles' album, The Blessed Unrest, which was nominated for a Grammy in the same year.

In 2019, Yagi produced the song "We Are Walking On" for the United Nations Environment Programme and World Environment Day, and dedicated it to the protection of earth and the promotion of the Sustainable Development Goals.

Yagi received his third Grammy at the 20th Latin Grammy Awards in the category "Best Rock Album" for Draco Rosa's Monte Sagrado, which was No.1 for 2 weeks on Billboard Latin Pop Albums chart. He was also nominated as producer for "Hotel de los Encuentros", which includes multiple tracks from Monte Sagrado with animation.

Yagi has participated in multiple gold and platinum record-winning projects, including Shania Twain's album, Now, which reached No.1 in the US, UK, Canada and Australia.

He currently serves as Goodwill Ambassador of the City of Kitakyushu, Japan.

== Awards ==
- 14th Annual Latin Grammy Awards: Album of the Year
- 56th Annual Grammy Awards: Best Latin Pop Album
- 20th Annual Latin Grammy Awards: Best Rock Album
- (Nomination) 20th Annual Latin Grammy Awards: Long Form Music Video
