= Más y Más =

- 2013 single cover

Single by Draco Rosa (2004) Draco Rosa featuring Ricky Martin (2013)

from the album Como Me Acuerdo Vida
- Released: 2004; January 6, 2013
- Recorded: 2004; 2012
- Genre: Latin pop
- Length: 3:21 (2004); 3:22 (2013)
- Label: Sony Music Latin
- Songwriters: Draco Cornelius Rosa; Itaal Shur; Luis Gómez-Escolar
- Producer: Phantom Vox

Draco Rosa singles chronology
"El Tiempo Va" (2012)	"Más y Más" (2004)	"Esto Es Vida" (2013)

Ricky Martin singles chronology
"La Isla Bonita" (2012)	"Más y Más" (2013)	"Come with Me" (2013)

Music video
- "Más y Más" (feat. Ricky Martin) on YouTube

"Más y Más" (English: "More and More") is a single by Draco Rosa from his 2004 album Como Me Acuerdo. It was nominated as Record of the Year and Song of the Year at the 2004 Latin Grammy Awards. The English-language version of the song, entitled "Crash Push", was released on the album Mad Love. Rosa again produced this song as the first single for his 2013 album Vida, the first one after his 2009 "Amor Vincit Omnia" as well as his first album after his cancer diagnosis in April 2011. It was released in 2004 as a CD single, while the duet with fellow ex-Menudo bandmate, Ricky Martin, was released as a digital download on January 6, 2013. The new recording nominated for the 2013 Latin Grammy Award for Record of the Year, the only song to be nominated twice in this category.

== Formats and track listings ==
2004

- Como Me Acuerdo
1. "Más y Más (Crash Push)" – 3:31

2013

- Vida
1. "Más y Más (feat. Ricky Martin)" – 3:22
- Vida: Walmart Exclusive Bonus Track
1. "Más y Más (Obscure Version)" – 3:32
- Exclusive iTunes single
1. "Más y Más (feat. Ricky Martin) [Versión Urbana]" – 3:21

== Music videos ==
The original music video, directed by Angela Alvarado Rosa, won the 2004 Latin Grammy Award for Best Short Form Music Video.

As part of the new projects, Draco and Ricky participated together in the recording of the single's music video in New York under the direction of Carlos Pérez. On January 14, 2013, Ricky Martin tweeted a photo of him and Draco with the caption "At the music video shoot of #MasYMas with my brother @dracorosa. #Vida". The music video was released on Draco's YouTube channel on February 13, 2013.

The music video for the obscure version of "Más y Más" was filmed at Phantom Vox Studios in Los Angeles in front of a small but intimate public and directed by Angela Alvarado, wife of Draco.

On January 15, 2014, an official lyric video to the version of the song featuring Ricky Martin was released on Draco's official Vevo YouTube channel. The lyric video shows an artist (whose face is not shown) while he makes a guitar out of wood then uses it to record the song and produce a demo CD while the lyrics of the song are displayed. At the end of the video, the faceless artist slides the completed demo disc of the song under the door of his presumed love interest (to which the song refers to directly). A woman picks up the CD and pauses to examine it intently.

== Chart performance ==
In the US, "Más y Más" entered the Latin Digital Songs and Latin Pop Digital Songs charts on the Billboard issue dated February 2, 2013, and the next week it debuted on the Hot Latin Songs. On the chart dated February 16, 2013, it entered the Latin Pop Airplay at number thirty-seven and the next week it debuted on the Latin Airplay chart at number forty-two. "Más y Más" peaked at number twenty-seven on Hot Latin Songs, number nine on Latin Pop Airplay and number twenty-eight on Latin Airplay.

== Charts ==
=== Weekly charts ===
Chart (2013)	Peak position
US Hot Latin Songs (Billboard)	27
US Latin Airplay (Billboard)	28
US Latin Pop Airplay (Billboard)	9

=== Year-end charts ===
Chart (2013)	Position
US Hot Latin Songs (Billboard)	79
US Latin Pop Songs (Billboard)	37

Chart (2018)	Position
Puerto Rico Pop (Monitor Latino)	75

Chart (2019)	Position
Puerto Rico Pop (Monitor Latino)	94

== See also ==
- Latin Grammy Award for Best Short Form Music Video
