= Maggie's Dream =

Alternative funk rock band

Maggie's Dream was an alternative funk rock band formed by Raf Hernandez, Danny Palomo, Lonnie Hillyer, Tony James, and former Menudo member and future solo musician, Draco Rosa. The band's stridency earned them a spot with Fishbone and Faith No More during their tours. They also opened for the Black Crowes on tour in 1991, though they were removed from the tour for making a commercial for Miller beer. Maggie's Dream was signed to Capitol Records and released only one album.

Their lone album was a hybrid of funk, soul and rock with Latin twists on some songs. The band was sometimes compared to Lenny Kravitz, who auditioned to be their singer and then changed his own musical style to a similar, retro 60s Beatlesque sound, Living Colour and Terrence Trent D'Arby.

== Maggie's Dream ==
Maggie's Dream

Studio album by Maggie's Dream
- Released: October 8, 1990
- Label: Capitol
- Producer: Josh Deutsch

=== Track listing ===
1. "Change for the Better" − 3:45
2. "Father Mother" − 4:58
3. "Love & Tears" − 4:49
4. "Human" − 4:26
5. "Living for the Times" − 4:02
6. "It's a Sin" − 4:35
7. "One in Six" − 5:08
8. "Between Fear and Desire" − 4:54
9. "I Can Take You" – 5:15
10. "Dear Simone" – 4:20
11. "Fly" – 5:41
