= Hollywood Confidential =

- Directed by: Reynaldo Villalobos
- Written by: Anthony Yerkovich
- Starring: Edward James Olmos; Charlize Theron
- Cinematography: Reynaldo Villalobos
- Edited by: Skip Schoolnik
- Music by: Marc Bonilla
- Production companies: Yerkovich Productions; Paramount Television
- Release date: April 14, 1997
- Running time: 92 minutes
- Country: United States
- Language: English

Hollywood Confidential is a 1997 television film directed by Reynaldo Villalobos. It won an ALMA Award in 1998.

== Synopsis ==
A Hollywood private investigator heads up a detective agency staffed with misfits who don't fit into the conventional world of law enforcement. Navarro and his team see the seedy underbelly of Hollywood's glitz and glamour and must deal with their own personal issues, often demons from previous careers.

The entire line of action centers on the agency and its investigations into particular situations that are either unlawful or otherwise embarrassing for their Tinsel Town celebrity clients. The story opens with the narrator recording his observations while monitoring an acting coach involved with local drug dealers. Charlize Theron plays Sally, a woman posing as a waitress in an upscale disco to investigate why the establishment is losing money. Then there is Stan Navarro (Edward James Olmos) who is being hired by the manager of a hot film director to buy off the young woman the director has seduced and impregnated. Everyone has a sordid back story and the film goes into the mind of some of the characters to show us an event that has affected the makeup of the character. For Navarro this event is his involvement in arresting a young man who has abused his wife and young daughter but has been kept out of jail by the FBI, and DEA because the perp has valuable information on a big drug dealer, but the criminal returns home to kill his wife and child. For another character Teresa (Angela Alvarado), a new addition to the agency the past has left her scarred because as a uniformed cop she wasn't able to take action when someone shoots her partner. The key issue is whether Stan Navarro can follow through on his assignment to dissuade the young woman from contacting the hot director who is up for a big award thus insuring his salability. Along the way some of the agents get beat up and hospitalized, some suffer psychic bombardment from past internalized events, and some openly confront with other agents their personal reasons for continuing in this less-than-honorable profession.

== Cast ==
- Edward James Olmos as Stan Navarro Sr.
- Rick Aiello as Joey Di Rosa
- Angela Alvarado as Teresa
- Christine Harnos as Shelly Katz
- A. Day Henden
- Richard T. Jones as Dexter
- Brendan Kelly as Mike Mooney
- Charlize Theron as Sally
- Thomas Jane as Lee
- Evelina Fernández as Mrs. Navarro
- Valarie Rae Miller as C.C.
- Marissa Ribisi as Zoey
- J. Downing as Barry Bliss
- Sarah Lassez as Heather Norland
- Brent Huff as Lawrence Brent
- Kristen Dalton as Dee Dee Powers
- Amanda Pays as Joan Travers
- William James Jones as Teddy
- Patrick Dollaghan as Striver
- Billy Marti as Tommy Gage
- Thomas Patti as The Bartender
- Anthony Hickox as Waiter
- Ivana Milicevic as Waitress
- Kaylan Romero as Stan Navarro Jr.
- Brendon Chad as Bobby
- Rene Mujica as Bodallio
- Warren Reno as Male Actor
- Madison Clark as Female Actor
- Anthony Yerkovich as Jack Hansen (uncredited)

== Production ==
Hollywood Confidential was a pilot for a TV series by Paramount, which would have begun airing in 1996. The pilot would instead air as a stand-alone TV movie on Paramount's UPN in April 1997. Despite the title, it bears no relation to the 1997 film L.A. Confidential, and was produced prior to it.
