= Blanca Mujer =

2013 promotional single by Draco Rosa featuring Shakira

Promotional single by Draco Rosa featuring Shakira

from the album Vida
- Language: Spanish
- English title: "White Woman"
- Released: 4 February 2013
- Studio: Phantom Vox Studios (Hollywood, CA)
- Genre: Rock en español; Latin pop; alternative rock; indie rock
- Length: 4:02
- Label: Sony Music Latin
- Songwriter: Draco Rosa
- Producers: Draco Rosa; George Noriega

Shakira promotional singles chronology
"Good Stuff" (2010)	"Blanca Mujer" (2013)	"Medicine" (2014)

Audio video
- "Blanca Mujer" on YouTube

"Blanca Mujer" (transl. "White Woman") is a song by Puerto Rican singer Draco Rosa from his fourth studio album Vagabundo (1996) and twelfth studio album Vida (2013). It was released on 4 February 2013 through Sony Music Latin as a promotional single featuring Colombian singer-songwriter Shakira. Rosa released another duet version of the song on 26 July 2023 featuring Mexican singer-songwriter Natalia Lafourcade. The song is written by Draco Rosa. It is a rock en español, Latin pop, alternative rock and indie rock song, with lyrics about life and death.

== Background and release ==
"'Blanca Mujer' is life and death. It speaks of death. 'Blanca Mujer' is that moment, where in that solitude, one hopes to find that white woman".

— Draco Rosa on "Blanca Mujer".

On 25 April 2011, Draco Rosa was diagnosed with cancer: a non-Hodgkin lymphoma, near his liver. Going through cancer treatments, he was under quarantine in his California home until 31 December 2012, when he was declared cancer-free. Rosa explained that the process of recording the album supported him in dealing with his cancer treatments, encouraging him to "continue with more desire and energy for life". Vida was released on 19 March 2013 and it features duet versions of Rosa's old songs with artists and bands such as Shakira, Ricky Martin, Alejandro Sanz, Juan Luis Guerra, Maná, Calle 13, and Marc Anthony. Rosa commented on the album recording process how "in difficult times, the music, the love and support of the public and all the colleagues who participated in this project has been an inspiration and a source of life".

Initially a solo song on Rosa's 1996 album Vagabundo, a duet version of "Blanca Mujer" featuring Shakira was released as a promotional single off Rosa's 2013 album Vida on 4 February 2013. By April 2013, the song received strong radio airplay in Latin America. On 26 July 2023, a version of the song by Rosa featuring Natalia Lafourcade was released. Their duet was recorded from a live performance at the José Miguel Agrelot Coliseum on 7 December 2013; the singers performed the song together several times during that year.

== Reception ==
Omar Sánchez Cárdena from Ramona Cultural outlined how in the original version of "Blanca Mujer" Rosa's fury "radiates desolation and sadness". RPP Editorial Staff praised the duet with Shakira, claiming that "the feeling with which both interpret the song complements each other in such a way that it will surely mark the great return of success" with Vida. Primera Hora commented how the duet "undoubtedly marks a new success in Draco's career". Bolivar Feijoo from Wow La Revista noted how for the Natalia Lafourcade duet Rosa "made new arrangements that make the experience of listening to it a moving and unforgettable event".
