= Mad Love (Robi Draco Rosa album) =

Studio album by Robi Draco Rosa
- Released: May 18, 2004
- Genre: Alternative rock
- Label: Sony Music

Robi Draco Rosa chronology
Vagabundo (1996)	Mad Love (2004)	Vino (2008)

Singles from Mad Love
- 1. "Dancing In the Rain/Noche Fria"; 2. "Lie Without a Lover"; 3. "Try Me"; 4. "Crash Push/Mas y Mas"; 5. "This Time"; 6. "Commitment #4"

Professional ratings
Review scores
Source	Rating
Rolling Stone	link

Mad Love is a concept album by Robi Draco Rosa.

== History ==
In 2003, Draco prepared for the release of his most ambitious project titled Mad Love consisting of lugubrious gothic ballads and esoteric windblown burdens. The album was the first to earn Draco international recognition beyond Latin America, becoming widely popular in Europe. With most songs in English and collaborations with musicians from all around the world, Mad Love included two videos directed by his wife, Angela Alvarado, "Dancing in the Rain" and "Lie Without a Lover". It also debuted at #2 on Billboard's Heatseeker charts and was considered the #1 Latin album of 2004 by New York’s Newsday. The video for "Más y Más" won the 2004 Latin Grammy Award for Best Video. In September 2004, Draco took his show to Puerto Rico's new 18,000-capacity stadium, selling out the venue. A CD/DVD of the event was released on December 6, 2005, titled Draco al Natural.

== Track listing ==
1. "Dancing in the Rain" - 4:59
2. "Lie Without a Lover" - 5:11
3. "Crash Push" - 3:30
4. "My Eyes Adore You" - 3:58
5. "Como Me Acuerdo" - 4:10
6. "Heaven Can Wait" - 2:58
7. "This Time" - 3:27
8. "California" - 4:39
9. "Try Me" - 3:18
10. "Solitary Man" - 3:55
11. "Never Know the Truth" - 3:02
12. "Do You Remember" - 4:28
13. "Mad Love" - 7:12
14. "Commitment #4" - 6:46
15. "Más y más" (Spanish Version of "Crash Push") - 3:31
16. "Noche Fria" (Spanish Version of "Dancing in the Rain") - 3:34

== Chart performance ==
Chart (2004)	Peak position
US Billboard 200	119
US Heatseekers Albums (Billboard)	2
