= Sound Loaded =

Studio album by Ricky Martin
- Released: November 14, 2000
- Studio: Various (see recording locations)
- Genres: Dance; pop; adult contemporary; Latin
- Length: 64:38
- Languages: English; Spanish
- Label: Columbia
- Producers: Walter Afanasieff; Draco Robi Rosa; Desmond Child; Emilio Estefan; George Noriega; Randall Barlow; Steve Morales; Mark Taylor; K.C. Porter

Ricky Martin chronology
Ricky Martin (1999)	Sound Loaded (2000)	La Historia (2001)

Singles from Sound Loaded
- 1. "She Bangs" Released: September 18, 2000; 2. "Nobody Wants to Be Lonely" Released: January 16, 2001; 3. "Loaded" Released: April 16, 2001

Sound Loaded is the sixth studio album by Puerto Rican singer Ricky Martin. It was released on November 14, 2000, by Columbia Records. Following the huge success of his first English album, Ricky Martin (1999), Martin returned to the studio to record its follow-up English album. He worked with producers Walter Afanasieff, Emilio Estefan, Draco Rosa, and Desmond Child to create the album. Musically, Sound Loaded consists of dance club tracks, pop songs, adult contemporary ballads, and mid-tempo Latin numbers. After the album's release, Martin embarked on a North American promotional tour.

The album was supported by three singles. The lead single "She Bangs" topped the charts in seven countries and reached the top five in Australia, Canada, the United Kingdom, and several other countries. The second single "Nobody Wants to Be Lonely" was re-recorded along with American singer Christina Aguilera and became a number one and top five hit around the world. "Loaded" was released as the album's final single and experienced moderate commercial success. Sound Loaded received generally favorable reviews from music critics, who complimented its dance tracks. The album was a commercial success. It debuted at number four on the US Billboard 200 with first-week sales of 318,000 copies. It also reached the top-five in Australia, Canada, Spain, Sweden, and Switzerland. It has received several certifications, including triple platinum in Canada and double platinum in the United States, and has sold over seven million copies worldwide.

== Background and recording ==
Ricky Martin released his fifth studio album and English-language debut, Ricky Martin in 1999, which became his biggest commercial success, debuting at number one on the US Billboard 200 chart and selling over 15 million copies worldwide. To further promote the album, he embarked on the worldwide Livin' la Vida Loca Tour. While the Livin' la Vida Loca Tour had not been concluded yet, Columbia Records asked Martin to return to the studio to record his sixth studio album. He later wrote about the request in Me, his official autobiography: "Now, when I think about it, I realize I should have said no. Definitely no! It was too soon and I was not ready to fully immerse myself in the intense creative work needed to record a new album." He reflected on it as "one of the worst decisions" of his life and "a very serious mistake". In October 2000, Rolling Stone revealed the album's title as Sound Loaded, mentioning that it is an English album set for release on November 14, 2000. During an interview with the CNN, Martin explained the idea behind the album's title:

When I gave my album a name - when I started talking to people about Sound Loaded - they said, "Is it about computers?" It is about listening to all those different sounds and having the opportunity to exchange ideas with, you know, people from different parts of the world, and just making all these different sounds part of my sound. It's all about educating. It's all about letting people know it doesn't matter what part of the world you are from. It's about feeling good with yourself. It's about trusting your emotions and your instincts - things that I talk about in my album.

The singer worked on the album with several producers and songwriters, including Walter Afanasieff, Emilio Estefan, Draco Rosa, and Desmond Child, and recorded it in Miami. During an interview with Billboard Martin explained: "It might sound clichéd, but it was my dream team. It was a situation devoid of egos. It was all about creativity. Everyone was open to working toward the same goal, which was to make the best possible record."

== Music and lyrics ==
"One Night Man"
A 22-second sample of the chorus of "One Night Man", which features elements of Arabic and salsa music.

Sound Loaded is a primarily English language album composed of 15 songs, consisting dance club tracks, pop songs, adult contemporary ballads, and mid-tempo Latin numbers. "She Bangs" is a dance song that features Latin and salsa music influences. The song's instrumentation features "powerful" percussion, trumpet blasts, and tropical beats. Lyrically, it tells a "tale of a wild woman who may be hard to let go and even harder to hold", which is "a metaphor for the universe". The album also contains a Spanish-language version of "She Bangs", which was recorded under the same title. "Saint Tropez" has Brazilian influences with a "delectable" 1980's vibe, using a "passionate" trumpet solo. "Come to Me" is a pop love song and ballad, featuring elements of flamenco. It also has a Spanish version titled "Ven A Mí" (transl. "Come to Me"). On "Loaded", Martin combines 1960's pop and Latin music with "hard rock vocal intonations". The album also contains a Spanish-language version of the song, titled "Dame Más" (transl. "Give Me More").

"Nobody Wants to Be Lonely" is a mid-tempo pop song and power ballad, featuring elements of flamenco and Latin music. The track is a love song about "heartbreak" and "longing", as well as "love, lose, and hope". "Amor" (transl. "Love") is a Latin-flavored Spanglish salsa and dance club song, with Cuban influences, that uses "a percussion break, a truncated pop-rock guitar solo, and a lazy, lolling piano". A salsa track using a "tip-top" piano, "Jezabel" talks about a woman's "ruthless romantic ambitions". "The Touch" is a power ballad, while the gypsy-tinged "One Night Man" features elements of salsa and Arabic music. In the energetic "Are You In It for Love", the singer suspects that his lover is "in it for kicks, private jets and Armani / And when the ride's over, will you even bother to call me?". "If You Ever Saw Her" is a fusion of pop-soul, glam rock, and urban contemporary music. The last track on the album, "Cambia la Piel" (transl. "Change the Skin") is a Spanish song, "marked by bleating horns, jagged electric guitar lines, and staccato counter-rhythms".

== Singles ==
Columbia Records released "She Bangs" to radio stations in several countries on September 22, 2000, as the lead single from the album. Thereafter, the song was released to the singles markets in October. The track was commercially successful, reaching number one in Argentina, Chile, Hong Kong, Italy, South Africa, Sweden, and Uruguay, as well as the top five in Australia, Canada, the United Kingdom, and several other countries. It was nominated for Best Male Pop Vocal Performance at the 43rd Annual Grammy Awards. The Spanish-language version of "She Bangs" reached the summit of the Billboard Hot Latin Tracks chart. "Nobody Wants to Be Lonely" was re-recorded along with American singer Christina Aguilera in December 2000. The duet was released to radio stations in the United States, on January 16, 2001, as the second single from the album. The single peaked at number one in Hungary, New Zealand, Romania, Poland, and Croatia, as well as the top five in Italy, Germany, Spain, and the United Kingdom, among others. It was nominated for Best Pop Collaboration with Vocals at the 44th Annual Grammy Awards. A Spanish-language solo version of the song, entitled "Sólo Quiero Amarte" (transl. "I Only Want to Love You"), was recorded by Martin and topped the Hot Latin Tracks chart.

Both "She Bangs" and "Nobody Wants to Be Lonely" reached the top-15 on the US Billboard Hot 100 chart and has been certified silver in the UK. The album's final single, "Loaded", was launched on April 17, 2001; it became a top-20 hit in Belgium, Romania, Spain, Sweden, and the United Kingdom. In the United States, it peaked at number 97 on the Hot 100. "Cambia la Piel" released as the only promotional single from Sound Loaded on October 15, 2001. Music videos were filmed for both English and Spanish versions of "She Bangs", "Nobody Wants to Be Lonely", "Sólo Quiero Amarte", "Loaded", and "Dame Más". The Spanish-language visual for "She Bangs" won the Latin Grammy Award for Best Music Video at the 2nd Annual Latin Grammy Awards, Video of the Year at the 13th Lo Nuestro Awards, and the Best Clip of the Year — Latin at the Billboard Music Video Awards. "Nobody Wants to Be Lonely" video won the award for Outstanding Music Video at the 2002 ALMA Awards.

== Marketing ==
=== Release ===
Sound Loaded was released by Columbia Records on November 14, 2000. The American edition contains a Spanglish radio edit for "She Bangs", titled "She Bangs (Obadam's Spanglish Radio Edit)" in addition to the standard track list. The Latin American edition of Sound Loaded includes "Sólo Quiero Amarte", while "Are You In It For Love" is not featured. Since Martin re-recorded "Nobody Wants to Be Lonely" with Aguilera after the album's original release, the duet was added to the album's track list later. The collaboration was not released in a major commercially available single format in the United States, and consumers could purchase the song only with buying the album. Those who had already bought the album could download it from Martin's website for free or mail a sticker from their copy of the album, receiving a free CD with the new version. In all regions, the re-issue used the same track list as the original and the duet was added as the second disc.

=== Live performances ===
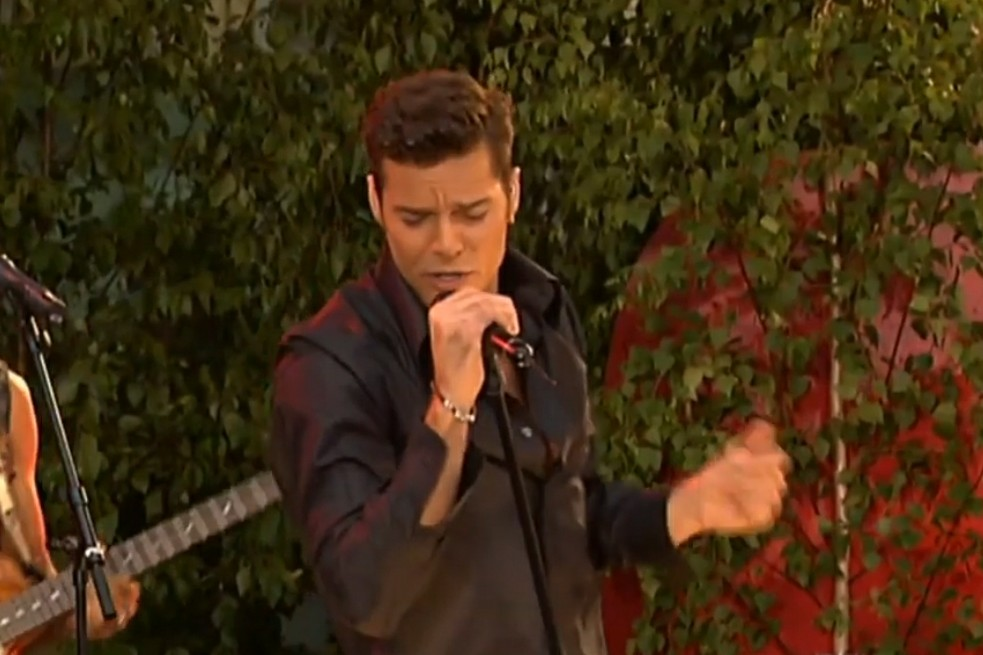
Martin performing "She Bangs" at the Allsång på Skansen.

To further promote Sound Loaded, Martin embarked on a North American promotional tour. The tour began on November 13, 2000, at the Irving Plaza in New York City, and concluded on February 26, 2001, at the Guvernment in Toronto, with five concerts throughout the United States, Mexico, and Canada. In addition to his tour, Martin performed singles from Sound Loaded on many television programs and award shows. He performed "She Bangs" at the 2000 Billboard Music Awards, the 2000 MTV Europe Music Awards, the 43rd Annual TV Week Logie Awards, the Today Show, Saturday Night Live, Al Fin de Semana, and Otro Rollo. The singer performed "Nobody Wants to Be Lonely" at the 28th Annual American Music Awards on January 8, 2001. Later that year, he and Aguilera gave live performances of their collaboration on The Tonight Show with Jay Leno, the ITV's CD:UK, and the 13th Annual World Music Awards. In the same year, Martin also performed "Cambia la Piel" at the Premios de la Música and "Loaded" at the Blockbuster Entertainment Awards. To promote the album's material in the United Kingdom, he delivered performances of "She Bangs", "Nobody Wants to Be Lonely" (with Aguilera), and "Loaded" on the BBC's Top of the Pops in November 2000, January 2001, and July 2001, respectively. In July 2001, Martin performed "She Bangs" and "Loaded" at the Allsång på Skansen, becoming the first "world-famous pop artist" ever to perform at the show, while breaking the record of its highest-attendance show with drawing an audience of 15,000.

== Critical reception ==
Professional ratings
Aggregate scores
Source	Rating
Metacritic	64/100
Review scores
Source	Rating
AllMusic	3.5/5 stars
The Baltimore Sun	2.5/4 stars
Billboard	4/5 stars
Entertainment Weekly	B−
Los Angeles Times	3/4 stars
The Philadelphia Inquirer	3/4 stars
Rolling Stone	3.5/5 stars
The Sacramento Bee	2.5/4 stars
USA Today	3/4 stars
Wall of Sound	7.2/10

Sound Loaded received generally favorable reviews from music critics. At Metacritic, which assigns a normalized rating out of 100 to reviews from mainstream critics, the album received an average score of 64 based on 6 reviews. Gary Graff from Wall of Sound gave it a positive review, saying it "is indeed loaded with sound, from lush love ballads to full-on polyrhythmic explosions made explicitly for bon-bon shaking" and all 15 tracks "sound as polished and lively as they do". He highlighted "Cambia la Piel" as the album's "most interesting track", describing it as "an edgy gem marked by bleating horns, jagged electric guitar lines, and staccato counter-rhythms". Writing for Rolling Stone, Arion Berger called the album "relentlessly likable and danceable", while introducing "Loaded" as the best track. An author of Billboard noted "a smattering of well-crafted material" in the album on which Martin is "allowed to truly strut his vocal stuff", highlighting "The Touch" and "Come To Me" as "lovely ballads". The critic thought that unlike Ricky Martin, there is "less of an attempt to fall in line with trends" and Martin trusted "listeners to subscribe to more traditional pop sounds", which resulted in "a more consistent recording". They also praised Martin's "special attention to his Latin roots by including a handful of solid Spanish-language tunes" that made the set "an album that offers a little something for everyone".

Charlotte Robinson from PopMatters mentioned "Nobody Wants to Be Lonely" and "The Touch" as the "lowlights" of Sound Loaded and labeled them "crummy ballads", while praising dance numbers such as "She Bangs" and "Loaded", as well as mid-tempo tracks. She highlighted "Amor" as one of the best mid-tempo songs in the collection and described "Cambia la Piel" as fabulous, adding the fact that the latter "prove once again that Martin is the only one of the stars of the 'Latin explosion' who actually makes Latin-sounding music on a regular basis". Similarly, AllMusic's Jose F. Promis called the album "a lushly produced set", praising its Latin-flavored dance tracks, including "Amor", "Jezabel", "Cambia La Piel", and "If You Ever Saw Her", describing the last one as endearing. He also stated that "She Bangs" is arguably one of best songs of the 2000s. Nevertheless, he thought that the ballads "tend to weigh the album down", introducing "Come to Me" and "The Touch" as "unmemorable" tracks.

=== Accolades ===
At the 7th Blockbuster Entertainment Awards, Sound Loaded was nominated for Favorite Male Artist of the Year and Favorite Artist — Latino, but lost them to Eminem's The Marshall Mathers LP (2000) and Christina Aguilera's Mi Reflejo (2000), respectively. Subsequently, it won the award for Favorite Male Artist — Pop at the ceremony. The album was also among the winning albums as the ten best-selling foreign releases at the 2001 Hong Kong Top Sales Music Awards.

== Commercial performance ==
Sound Loaded debuted at number four on the Billboard 200 with first-week sales of 318,000 copies, according to data compiled by Nielsen SoundScan for the chart dated December 2, 2000, becoming Martin's second top-five album on the list. It also debuted at number four on Billboard's Top Internet Album Sales chart in the same week. It sold over 760,000 copies in its first four weeks. Although the album was released in November, it was ranked among the best-selling albums of 2000 in the United States, selling over 1.1 million copies in the country. In December 2000, it was certified double platinum by the Recording Industry Association of America (RIAA), denoting shipments of over two million copies in the US. As of January 2011, it has sold over 1,679,000 copies in the country, according to Nielsen SoundScan, making it Martin's second best-selling album in the US, only behind Ricky Martin (1999).

Sound Loaded debuted at number three in Australia, on the chart issue dated November 19, 2000. It was later certified double platinum by the Australian Recording Industry Association (ARIA), denoting shipments of over 140,000 copies in the country. In Canada, it peaked at number three on the Billboard's Canadian Albums Chart selling 26,000 on its first week and was certified triple platinum by the Canadian Recording Industry Association (CRIA), denoting shipments of over 300,000 units in the region. The album also reached number three in Spain, where it was certified double platinum by the Productores de Música de España (Promusicae), denoting shipments of over 200,000 copies. Additionally, Sound Loaded reached the top-10 in Argentina, Italy, Japan, New Zealand, Sweden, and Switzerland. In the United Kingdom, it debut number sixteen selling 21,476 copies. Eventually, it was certified platinum by the British Phonographic Industry (BPI), denoting shipments of over 300,000 copies in the country. By May 2003, the album had sold over 4 million copies worldwide. As of November 2006, the album has sold over seven million copies worldwide.

== Track listing ==
Sound Loaded – Standard edition
No.	Title	Writer(s)	Producer(s)	Length
1.	"She Bangs" (English Version)	Desmond Child; Robi Rosa; Walter Afanasieff	Rosa; Afanasieff	4:40
2.	"Saint Tropez"	Child; Rosa	Child	4:48
3.	"Come to Me"	James Goodwin; David Resnik; Rosa	George Noriega; Emilio Estefan, Jr.	4:33
4.	"Loaded"	Jon Secada; Noriega; Rosa	Rosa; Noriega; Estefan	3:53
5.	"Nobody Wants to Be Lonely"	Victoria Shaw; Gary Burr; Child	Child	5:05
6.	"Amor"	Rosa; Liza Quintana; Randy Barlow	Rosa; Estefan; Barlow	3:27
7.	"Jezabel"	Child; Peter Amato	Child	3:48
8.	"The Touch"	Diane Warren; Child	Child	4:27
9.	"One Night Man"	Kara DioGuardi; Steve Morales; David Siegel; Secada; Manny López	Morales; Estefan	3:47
10.	"She Bangs" (Spanish Version)	Glenn Monroig; Julia Sierra; Rosa; Daniel López; Afanasieff; Child	Afanasieff; Rosa	4:37
11.	"Are You in It for Love"	Child; Paul Barry	Mark Taylor	4:06
12.	"Ven a Mí (Come to Me)" (Spanish Edit)	D. López; Resnik; Goodwin; Rosa	Noriega; Estefan	4:32
13.	"If You Ever Saw Her"	Barry; Taylor	Taylor	3:49
14.	"Dame Más (Loaded)" (Spanish Edit)	Rosa; Roberto Gaitan; Alberto Gaitan; Noriega; Secada; Roberto Blades	Estefan; Rosa	3:53
15.	"Cambia la Piel" (Spanish Edit)	Pau Donés Cirera	KC Porter	5:13
Total length:				64:38

American bonus track
No.	Title	Length
16.	"She Bangs" (Obadam's Spanglish Radio Edit)	4:00

Sound Loaded – Physical reissue (disc two)
No.	Title	Writer(s)	Producer(s)	Length
1.	"Nobody Wants to Be Lonely" (with Christina Aguilera)	Child; Burr; Shaw	Afanasieff	4:12

Sound Loaded – Latin American and Spain edition
No.	Title	Writer(s)	Producer(s)	Length
11.	"Ven a Mí (Come to Me)" (Spanish Edit)	D. López; Resnik; Goodwin; Rosa	Noriega; Estefan	4:32
12.	"If You Ever Saw Her"	Barry; Taylor	Taylor	3:49
13.	"Dame Más (Loaded)" (Spanish Edit)	Rosa; Roberto Gaitan; Alberto Gaitan; Noriega; Secada; Roberto Blades	Estefan; Rosa	3:53
14.	"Cambia la Piel" (Spanish Edit)	Cirera	KC Porter	5:13
15.	"Sólo Quiero Amarte (Nobody Wants to Be Lonely)" (Radio Edit)	Ricky Martin; D. López	Child	3:58

== Personnel ==
Credits for Sound Loaded adapted from AllMusic and the album liner notes.

=== Recording and mixing locations ===
- Sony Music Studios, New York City
- The Hit Factory Criteria, Miami
- The Gentlemen's Club, Miami Beach, Florida
- Wallyworld, Pittsburgh
- Capitol Studios, Hollywood, California
- Airborn Studios, Indianapolis
- Quad Recording Studios, Nashville, Tennessee
- Crescent Moon Studios, Coral Terrace, Florida
- Cello 1 Studios, Los Angeles
- Tone King Studios, Los Angeles
- Kokopelli Studios, Miami
- Dreamhouse Studios, London
- Rumbo Recorders, Canoga Park, Los Angeles
- WorldBeat Recordings, Calabasas, California
- Big Dog Studios, Miami
- Barking Doctor Studios Mount Kisco, New York
- Sterling Sound, New York City

=== Musicians and technical ===
- Ricky Martin – performer, primary artist, vocals, executive producer, background vocals, percussion
- Robi Rosa – arranger, composer, executive producer, producer, vocal arrangement, background vocals
- Desmond Child – composer, piano, producer, vocal producer
- Walter Afanasieff – composer, drum programming, keyboards, producer, programming
- George Noriega – arranger, composer, guitar, keyboards, producer, programming, vocal arrangement, background vocals
- Emilio Estefan, Jr. – arranger, producer
- Jon Secada – composer, vocal arrangement, vocal producer
- KC Porter – arranger, engineer, keyboards, producer, programming, background vocals
- Randall Barlow – arranger, horn arrangements, keyboards, producer, programming, trumpet
- Daniel López – composer, percussion, producer, background vocals
- Steve Morales – arranger, composer, keyboards, producer, vocal producer
- Pete Amato – arranger, composer, drum programming, keyboards
- Mark Taylor – composer, keyboards, mixing, producer, programming
- Manny López – composer, guitar
- Gary Burr – composer, guitar
- David Siegel – composer, keyboards
- Paul Barry – composer, background vocals
- Randy Barlow – composer
- Roberto Blades – composer
- Kara DioGuardi – composer
- Alberto Gaitán – composer
- James Goodwin – composer
- Glenn Monroig – composer
- David Resnik – composer
- Liza Quintana – composer
- Victoria Shaw – composer
- Julia Sierra – composer
- Diane Warren – composer
- Murray Adler – violin
- Pablo Alfaro – photography
- Pedro Alfonso – violin
- Rusty Anderson – guitar, electric guitar
- Wayne Andre – trombone
- Marcelo Añez – engineer
- Tommy Anthony – background vocals
- Iris Aponte – project coordinator
- Chris Apostle – production coordination
- Kenny Aronoff – drums
- Eric Bazilian – guitar
- Bob Becker – viola
- Tom Bender – assistant engineer
- Kurt Berge – technical support
- Herb Besson – trombone (bass)
- Greg Bieck – digital programming, engineer
- Charlie Bisherat – violin
- Curt Bisquera – drums
- Oswald Wiz Bone – engineer
- Gustavo Bonnet – assistant engineer
- Larry Brooks – assistant engineer
- Denyse Buffum – viola
- Olbin Burgos – drums
- Eve Butler – violin
- Alex Caballero – technical support
- Cachao – bass, soloist
- Danny Cahn – trumpet
- Ed Calle – horn, saxophone
- Scott Canto – engineer
- Randy Cantor – keyboards, programming, rhythm arrangements
- Chris Carroll – engineer
- Gustavo Celis – engineer
- Susan Chatman – violin
- Steve Churchyard – string engineer
- Brian Coleman – production coordination
- Ramses Colón – bass
- Tony Concepcion – horn, trumpet
- Bob Conley – programming
- Luis Conte – percussion
- Michael Contratto – background vocals
- Larry Corbett – cello
- Ricardo Cordero – project coordinator
- Mike Couzzi – engineer
- Ronnie Cuber – baritone sax
- Sal Cuevas – bass, electric bass
- Ian Cuttler – art direction, design
- Joel Derouin – concert master
- Michelle Diaz – piano
- Kevin Dillon – studio coordinator
- Glenn Drewes – trumpet
- Bruce Dukov – violin
- Charles Dye – engineer
- Rob Eaton – engineer, mixing
- Ernie Erhardt – cello
- Gyan Evans – background vocals
- Benny Faccone – mixing
- Matthew Funes – viola
- Marco Gamboa – engineer
- Armen Garabedian – violin
- Berj Garabedian – violin
- Earl Gardner – trumpet
- Hector Garrido – horn arrangements, piano, string arrangements, string Conductor
- Steve Genewick – assistant engineer
- David Gleeson – engineer
- Conrad Golding – assistant engineer
- Jules Gondar – engineer, mixing
- Jorge Gonzalez – assistant engineer
- Roger Gonzalez – assistant engineer
- Erwin Gorostiza – art direction
- Endre Granat – concert master, violin
- Ron Grant – background vocals
- Maurice Grants – cello
- Matt Gruber – engineer
- Mick Guzauski – mixing
- Jim Hacker – trumpet
- Mike Harvey – background vocals
- Clayton Haslop – violin
- John Hayhurst – viola
- Scott Healy – horn arrangements
- Paquito Hechevarria – piano
- John Hendrickson – assistant engineer
- Dino Hermann – assistant engineer, engineer
- Gerry Hilera – violin
- Jennifer Hilliard – assistant engineer, engineer
- Jimmy Hoyson – assistant engineer
- Joanna Ifrah – A&R
- Ted Jensen – mastering
- Steve Juliani – librarian
- Suzie Katayama – cello, string contractor
- Peter Kent – violin
- Scott Kieklak – assistant engineer
- Renita Koven – viola
- Sebastián Krys – engineer, mixing
- Gary Kuo – violin
- Damien Kutny – assistant engineer
- Abraham Laboriel, Sr. – drums
- Nanette Lamboy – project coordinator
- Michael Landau – acoustic guitar, electric guitar, soloist
- Maurice Lauchner – background vocals
- Gustavo Laureano – background vocals
- Dan Lawrence – production coordination
- Calanit Ledani – chant
- Will Lee – background vocals
- Leyla Leeming – production coordination
- Mario de León – violin
- Brian Leonard – violin
- Lee Levin – drums
- Jolie Levine-Aller – production coordination
- Linda Lipsett – viola
- Larry Loftin – background vocals
- Craig Lozowick – assistant engineer, engineer
- José Juan Maldonado – production coordination
- Nathan Malki – assistant engineer, engineer
- Andy Manganno – assistant engineer
- Fabian Marasciullo – assistant engineer
- Tony Mardini – assistant engineer
- Miguel Martinez – cello
- Tony Maserati – mixing
- Michael Matthews – cello
- Peter McCabe – engineer
- Darrin McCann – viola
- Hugh McDonald – bass
- Ángelo Medina – executive producer
- Steve Menezes – studio coordinator
- Joe Meyer – French horn
- Mike Migliore – alto sax
- Tim Mitchell – guitar, electric guitar
- Wanda Montes – hair stylist
- Jorge Moraga – viola
- Carole Mukogawa – viola
- Herman "Teddy" Mulet – cuatro, horn arrangements, trombone, trumpet
- Posie Muliadi – assistant engineer
- Illyak Negroni – background vocals
- Robbie Nevil – background vocals
- Joe Novo – assistant engineer
- Brian O'Connor – French horn
- Keith O'Quinn – trombone
- Germán Ortiz – assistant engineer, engineer
- Ricardo "Tiki" Pasillas – percussion
- Andy Pechenik – technical support
- Archie Pena – percussion
- John Pena – bass
- Mark Pender – trumpet
- Robert Peterson – violin
- Adam Phillips – guitar
- Lenny Pickett – tenor sax
- Tim Pierce – electric guitar
- Freddy Piñero, Jr. – engineer
- Jeff Poe – engineer
- Vladimir Polimatidi – violin
- Karie Prescott – viola
- Rachel Purkin – violin
- Luis Quine – assistant engineer, engineer
- Cheito Quinonez – background vocals
- Brian Rawling – drums
- Dave Reitzas – engineer
- Michele Richards – violin
- Steve Richards – cello, viola
- Mike Rivera – assistant engineer
- Richie Rosenberg – trombone
- Anatoly Rosinsky – violin
- Nancy Roth – viola
- Maital Sabbon – make-up
- Alan Sanderson – assistant engineer, engineer
- Arturo Sandoval – flugelhorn, trumpet
- Carlos Santos – assistant engineer
- Stephen Saper – authoring
- Eric Schilling – engineer
- Aaron Shannon – assistant engineer
- José Sibaja – trumpet
- Dan Smith – cello
- Rafael Solano – percussion
- Ramón Stagnaro – cavaquinho, cuatro, acoustic guitar, guitar (nylon string), tres
- Sheldon Steiger – engineer
- Edmund Stein – violin
- Rudy Stein – cello
- Shane Stoner – engineer
- Paul Stura – stylist
- Sarah Sykes – production coordination
- Carl Tallarico – production coordination
- Ron Taylor – engineer
- Dana Teboe – horn, trombone
- Ken Theis – assistant engineer
- David Thoener – mixing
- Regine Thorre – make-up
- Rene Toledo – acoustic guitar, soloist
- Nestor Torres – flute
- Alexander Trainer – graphic design
- Walter Turbitt – mixing
- Juan Turek – assistant engineer
- Camilo Valencia – horn, horn arrangements
- Jose Luis Vega – image design
- Jerry Vivino – tenor sax
- Chris Wiggins – assistant engineer
- Ed Williams – assistant engineer
- Chris Willis – background vocals
- Evan Wilson – viola
- Ken Yerke – violin
- Jong Uk Yoon – assistant engineer
- Sandy Yuzon – graphic design

== Charts ==
=== Weekly charts ===
Weekly chart performance for Sound Loaded
Chart (2000–2001)	Peak position
Argentine Albums (CAPIF)	10
Australian Albums (ARIA)	3
Austrian Albums (Ö3 Austria)	23
Belgian Albums (Ultratop Flanders)	32
Belgian Albums (Ultratop Wallonia)	50
Canadian Albums (Billboard)	3
Danish Albums (Hitlisten)	13
Dutch Albums (Album Top 100)	38
European Albums (Top 100)	12
Finnish Albums (Suomen virallinen lista)	11
French Albums (SNEP)	46
German Albums (Offizielle Top 100)	17
Greek Foreign Albums (IFPI)	1
Hungarian Albums (MAHASZ)	21
Irish Albums (IRMA)	38
Italian Albums (FIMI)	10
Japanese Albums (Billboard Japan)	10
Japanese Albums (Oricon)	11
New Zealand Albums (RMNZ)	9
Norwegian Albums (VG-lista)	11
Polish Albums (ZPAV)	17
Scottish Albums (Official Charts)	13
Spanish Albums (PROMUSICAE)	3
Swedish Albums (Sverigetopplistan)	3
Swiss Albums (Schweizer Hitparade)	4
UK Albums (Official Charts)	14
US Billboard 200	4
US Top Internet Album Sales (Billboard)	4

=== Year-end charts ===
2000 year-end chart performance for Sound Loaded
Chart (2000)	Position
Australian Albums (ARIA)	26
Canadian Albums (Nielsen SoundScan)	64
Finnish Foreign Albums (Suomen virallinen lista)	106
South Korean International Albums (MIAK)	33
Swiss Albums (Schweizer Hitparade)	71
UK Albums (OCC)	83

2001 year-end chart performance for Sound Loaded
Chart (2001)	Position
Canadian Albums (Nielsen SoundScan)	186
Swedish Albums (Sverigetopplistan)	34
Swiss Albums (Schweizer Hitparade)	100
UK Albums (OCC)	134
US Billboard 200	48

== Certifications and sales ==
Certifications and sales for Sound Loaded
Region	Certification	Certified units/sales
Argentina (CAPIF)	Gold	30,000^{^}
Australia (ARIA)	2× Platinum	140,000^{^}
Canada (Music Canada)	3× Platinum	300,000^{^}
Denmark (IFPI Danmark)	Gold	25,000^{^}
Finland (Musiikkituottajat)	Gold	24,464
Germany (BVMI)	Gold	150,000^{^}
Japan (RIAJ)	Platinum	200,000^{^}
Mexico (AMPROFON)	Platinum+Gold	225,000^{^}
New Zealand (RMNZ)	Platinum	15,000^{^}
Norway (IFPI Norway)	Gold	25,000^{*}
Poland (ZPAV)	Gold	50,000^{*}
Singapore (RIAS)	2× Platinum	30,000
South Korea (RIAK)	—	64,931
Spain (Promusicae)	2× Platinum	200,000^{^}
Sweden (GLF)	Platinum	80,000^{^}
Switzerland (IFPI Switzerland)	Gold	25,000^{^}
United Kingdom (BPI)	Platinum	300,000^{^}
United States (RIAA)	2× Platinum	2,000,000^{^}
Summaries
Europe (IFPI)	Platinum	1,000,000^{*}
Worldwide	—	7,000,000
^{*} Sales figures based on certification alone.^{^} Shipments figures based on certification alone.

== Release history ==
Release dates and formats for Sound Loaded
Region	Date	Format(s)	Label(s)	Ref.
Taiwan	November 3, 2000	CD	Columbia Records	
Japan	November 8, 2000	CD	Epic Records	
Europe	November 14, 2000	CD	Columbia Records	
Hong Kong	November 14, 2000	CD	Columbia Records	

== See also ==
- 2000 in music
- List of top 25 albums for 2000 in Australia
