= Gummibärchen küßt man nicht =

- Directed by: Walter Bannert
- Written by: Erich Tomek
- Produced by: Karl Spiehs
- Starring: Christopher Mitchum; Ernest Borgnine; John Hillerman; Draco Rosa; Angela Alvarado; Art Metrano; Bentley Mitchum; Käte Jaenicke; Julia Kent; Arthur Brauss
- Cinematography: Hanus Polak
- Edited by: Jutta Brandstaedter
- Music by: Draco Rosa
- Production companies: K.S. Film; Lisa Film
- Distributed by: Tivoli
- Release date: August 17, 1989 (Germany)
- Running time: 89 minutes
- Country: West Germany
- Languages: German; English

Gummibärchen küßt man nicht (English direct translation – One does not kiss gummy bears (English title – Real Men Don't Eat Gummy Bears)) is a 1989 West German comedy film. Despite featuring mainly American actors, the film was never released outside of Germany.

== Cast ==
- Christopher Mitchum as Johannes Thalberg / Josef Thalberg
- Draco Rosa as Peter
- John Hillerman as Padre
- Angela Alvarado as Angela
- Bentley Mitchum as Tony
- Ernest Borgnine as The Bishop
- Art Metrano as Secret Agent 712
- Julia Kent as Secret Agent KX 3
- John van Dreelen as Geyer
- Arthur Brauss as Colonel
- Amadeus August as Spy
- Käte Jaenicke as Gundula

== Production ==
Gummibärchen küßt man nicht was filmed from March 12 to April 20 in Gran Canaria. The film was released on August 17, 1989, in German cinemas and in March 1990 on video. On November 4, 1991, the film was shown for the first time on German television channel RTL and was released with two other films in the series of German cult classic on DVD in 2008.

== Soundtrack ==
1. Real Men Don't Eat Gummibears – 3:35 (Hong Kong Syndikat)
2. Angela – 4:54 (Robby Rosa)
3. A Cry In The Night – 3:24 (Lory Bonnie Bianco)
4. What Is Love – 3:35 (Eric & Hilda)
5. Rise Into – 4:08 (Private Property)
6. Kalmbach's Peace Of Mind – 3:34 (Midnight Cop)
7. Whose Gonna Love You Tonight – 3:52 (Nino de Angelo)
8. Little Woman – 3:35 (Robby Rosa)
9. Tell Me Why – 4:05 (Tony Baez)
10. Love Is Gonna Last Forever – 3:50 (Scott & Louise Dorsey)
11. Rumble Rag – 3:00 (Midnight Cop)
12. Bring Me Edelweiss – 3:43 (Edelweiss)
