= Vino (album) =

Studio album by Draco Rosa
- Released: September 28, 2008
- Genre: Alternative rock
- Label: Phantom Vox
- Producer: Draco Rosa

Draco Rosa chronology
| Mad Love (2004) | Vino (2008) | Amor Vincit Omnia (2009) |

Alternative cover and title
- El Teatro del Absurdo (2007)

Singles from Vino
- 1. "Luchar Por Ella" Released: 2007; 2. "Desnudo (Happy)" Released: 2008; 3. "Te Fumaré" Released: 2008; 4. "Sueño Contigo" Released: 2009

Vino is an album released by Draco Rosa. It was released in 2008 under Phantom Vox and a follow-up to Vagabundo. It was first published during the summer of 2007 under the alternate title of El Teatro del Absurdo in certain territories.

== Background ==
Draco terminated all contractual liaisons with Sony Music soon after the release of Mad Love. This freedom gave way to Vino, his first Spanish album since the release of Vagabundo in 1996.

== Track listing ==
All songs by Draco Rosa, excepted where noted.

1. "Todo Es Vino"
2. "Te Fumaré"
3. "Es la Guerra"
4. "Sueño Contigo"
5. "Aleluya" (Leonard Cohen)
6. "Todo Marcha Bien"
7. "Desnudo (Happy)"
8. "Horizonte"
9. "Bosque de los Números"
10. "Hasta la Victoria"
11. "One Too Many Mornings" (Bob Dylan)
12. "Roto por Ti"
13. "Mensaje de Paz"
14. "Luchar Por Ella"
