= Vagabundo =

Studio album by Robi Dräco Rosa
- Released: June 18, 1996
- Recorded: November 1995 – January 1996
- Genre: Grunge; hard rock; alternative metal
- Length: 48:16
- Label: Sony Music
- Producer: Phil Manzanera

Robi Dräco Rosa chronology
Frio (1994)	Vagabundo (1996)	Mad Love (2004)

Singles from Vagabundo
- 1. "Madre Tierra" Released: 1996; 2. "Vagabundo" Released: 1996; 3. "Para No Olvidar" Released: 1997; 4. "Penelope" Released: May 24, 1997; 5. "Vivir" Released: 1997; 6. "Amantes Hasta El Fin" Released: 1997

Vagabundo is a concept album by Robi Dräco Rosa. It was recorded in Surrey, England under the creative direction of Roxy Music guitarist Phil Manzanera. The music video for "Madre Tierra" was directed by Angela Alvarado and won Best Rock Video in the 1997 Latin Music Awards. The album was also included in Spin Magazine's 1997 Top 10 list of greatest Latin Rock records of all time.

== Track listing ==
1. "Hablando del Amor" (Navarro, Rosa) – 1:14
2. "Madre Tierra" (Escolar, Rosa) – 3:35
3. "Llanto Subterráneo" (Rosa, Sabines) – 3:52
4. "Vagabundo" (Navarro, Rosa) – 3:37
5. "Penélope" (Navarro, Rosa) – 4:45
6. "Delirios" (Rosa, Tena) – 3:00
7. "Para No Olvidar" (Rosa, Sabines) – 4:16
8. "Blanca Mujer" (Escolar, Rosa) – 3:51
9. "Vértigo" (Navarro, Rosa) – 2:43
10. "Vivir" (Escolar, Rosa) – 4:21
11. "Brujería" (Escolar, Rosa) – 3:28
12. "La Flor del Frío" (Navarro, Rosa) – 3:55
13. "Amantes Hasta el Fin" (Navarro, Rosa) – 5:02
14. "Mientras Camino" (Navarro, Rosa) – 0:37

== Personnel ==
- Robi Dräco Rosa – vocals, electric and acoustic guitars, bass, harmonica, piano, sound effects
- Rusty Anderson – electric guitar
- Carla Azar – percussion, drums
- Paul Bushnell – bass
- Phil Manzanera – custom guitar, musical director, record producer
- Geoff Dugmore – drums
- Peter Gordeno – piano, hammond organ, clavinet, mellotron
- Sara Loewenthal – arranger
- Roddy Lorimer – trumpet, flugelhorn, piccolo trumpet
- Ash Howes – mixing engineer
- Charles Rees – assistant engineer
- Chucho Merchán – bass
- Dinah Beamish, Ellen Blair, Chris Eaton and Jos Pook
- Roger Gorman – art director
- Jana Leon – photography
- Draco Rosa – liner notes

== Certifications ==
Certifications for Vagabundo
Region	Certification	Certified units/sales
United States (RIAA)	Platinum (Latin)	60,000^{‡}
^{‡} Sales+streaming figures based on certification alone.
