= Engombe Sugar Mill =

The Ingenio Engombe (or Engombe Sugar Mill) is located in the Santo Domingo Oeste municipality from the Santo Domingo province of the Dominican Republic. The 16th century mill was a leading regional producer of sugar, and a signifying exemplar of renaissance-era architecture for its lavish forms. A two-story mansion and a chapel remain standing on the sugar mill grounds. The site is being considered to be put on the World Heritage list of sites who have "outstanding universal value" to the world.

== World Heritage Status ==
This site was added to the UNESCO World Heritage Tentative List on November 21, 2001, in the Cultural category.
