= Angela Alvarado =

American actress and director

- Born: Puerto Rico
- Occupations: Actress and director
- Years active: 1986–present
- Spouse: Draco Rosa (m. 1988; div. 2019)

Angela Alvarado is an American actress and director. She was married to singer Draco Rosa for nearly 31 years.

== Early years ==
Alvarado was born in Puerto Rico. Some of her youth was spent there and some in New Jersey. She worked as a model to pay her tuition in college.

== Career ==
Alvarado is the director of several of her husband's music videos, including "Madre Tierra", "Mas y Mas", "Lie Without a Lover", and "Dancing in the Rain". The last three videos come from the album Mad Love, released in 2004. Alvarado worked closely with her husband for the production of this record. In September 2004, alongside her husband, Alvarado won a Latin Grammy Award for the video "Mas y Mas".

Alvarado appeared in the 1993 film Judgment Night, the 1997 film Hollywood Confidential, in the 2001 TV movie Boss of Bosses (starring Chazz Palminteri) and in the 2007 drama Freedom Writers, playing the mother of April Lee Hernandez's character. In 2003 she was in the NBC series Kingpin as DEA agent Delia Flores.

Alvarado recorded a public service announcement for Deejay Ra's 'Hip-Hop Literacy' campaign. She also appeared as the main character (dancer) in the video for Woman In Chains by Tears for Fears.

== Personal life ==
Alvarado married Robert Rosa, and they have two children.

== Filmography ==
=== Film ===
Year	Title	Role	Notes
1987	Heartbeat	Prostitute	Direct-to-video
1988	She's Having a Baby	Model	
1988	Salsa	Vicki	
1989	Gummibärchen küßt man nicht	Angela	
1993	Shadowhunter	Ray Whitesinger	
1993	Judgment Night	Rita	
1994	I'll Do Anything	Lucy Cristala	
1995	Dead Badge	Celina Rojas	
1998	Butter	Registress	
2000	Living the Life	Pilar	
2001	Boss Of Bosses	Gloria	
2002	D-Tox	Lopez	
2002	Showtime	Gina Reyes	
2005	The Wendell Baker Story	Irma	
2007	Freedom Writers	Eva's Mother	
2017	Magnum Opus	Interrogator Garcia	
2018	Replicas	Ms. Barnes	

=== Television ===
Year	Title	Role	Notes
1986	Miami Vice	Jan Larken	Episode: "Killshot"
1987	Who's the Boss?	Ariel	Episode: "Older Than Springtime"
1987	Private Eye	Angela Raza	Episode: "Barrio Nights"
1990	Night Visions	Aura	Television film
1991	Daughters of Privilege	Felicia	Television film
1993	Jack Reed: Badge of Honor	Marie Sanchez	Television film
1997	Hollywood Confidential	Teresa	Television film
1997	Gun	Gloria	Episode: "Father John"
1997	Desert's Edge	Desert's Edge	Television film
1998	Profiler	Marissa Cuellar	Episode: "Every Five Minutes"
1999	Pacific Blue	Carmen Rios	Episode: "Save Serenity"
2002	Point of Origin	Mexican Woman	Television film
2002	Without a Trace	Amalia Kent	Episode: "Silent Partner"
2003	Kingpin	DEA Agent Delia Flores	6 episodes
2005	Ghost Whisperer	Rachel Borgia	Episode: "On the Wings of a Dove"
2006	Dexter	Nina Batista	3 episodes
2008	Lone Rider	Serena	Television film
2011	The Young and the Restless	Judge Salazar	8 episodes
2012	Grimm	The Woman	Episode: "La Llorona"
2013	Rizzoli & Isles	Prisoner Gomez	Episode: "Killer in High Heels"
2013	Bones	Dr. Leticia Perez	Episode: "The Nazi on the Honeymoon"
2015	The Fosters	Tasha's Social Worker	Episode: "If You Only Knew"
2015	The Mentalist	Detective Nieto	Episode: "Brown Shag Carpet"
2018	Run for Your Life	Elena Macias	Television film
2021	Grey's Anatomy	Marcella Diaz	Episode: "Breathe"
2021	The Blank's YPF	Martha	Episode: "Week 2 (2021)"
2024	S.W.A.T.	Captain Olvera	2 episodes
