= Draco Rosa =

American musician (born 1969)

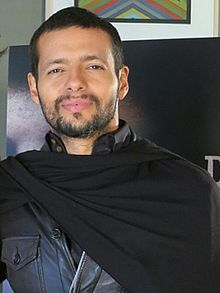
- Draco in 2013

Background information
- Also known as: Robi Draco Rosa; Robi Rosa; Draco; Ian Blake (or Mr. Blake); Dolores del Infante (1999); Robi Star
- Born: Robert Edward Rosa Suárez; June 27, 1970 (age 56); Long Island, New York, U.S.
- Origin: Peñuelas, Puerto Rico; Ponce, Puerto Rico
- Genres: Rock; rock en español; alternative rock; art rock; experimental rock; psychedelic rock; indie rock; electronic (as Mr. Blake)
- Occupations: Musician; singer; songwriter; entrepreneur
- Instruments: Vocals; guitar; bass; piano
- Years active: 1984–present
- Labels: RCA; Phantom Vox; Sony Latin; Capitol; Phantom Vox Corp
- Formerly of: Menudo; Maggie's Dream
- Spouse: Angela Alvarado (m. 1988; div. 2019)
- Website: dracorosa.com

Draco Cornelius Rosa Suárez (Spanish: [ˈdɾako koɾˈneljus ˈrosa ˈswaɾes]; born Robert Edward Rosa Suárez, June 27, 1969), also known as Draco Rosa, Robi Draco Rosa or simply Robi or Draco, is an American musician.

Rosa originally garnered fame as a member of boy band Menudo in the 1980s, singing lead on the band's biggest stateside hit, "Hold Me" and featuring prominently in the accompanying music video. After leaving the band he moved to Brazil where he released two albums, achieving mainstream success. Following a brief subsequent stint in California, he returned to New York and joined the band Maggie's Dream, which split after only one album, allowing him to resume his solo career. The singer and composer has released numerous albums, and has composed multiple songs for Ednita Nazario, Julio Iglesias and former Menudo band-mate, Ricky Martin. He has also been featured on VH1's Behind the Music.

Rosa has been highly influenced by the works of Bob Dylan, Miles Davis, Iggy Pop, Jimi Hendrix, Johnny Cash, Luis Alberto Spinetta, The Doors, Camarón de la Isla, Horacio Quiroga, Caetano Veloso, Glenn Danzig, Edgar Allan Poe and Jim Morrison.

In 1988, at age 18, he made his motion picture debut in the film Salsa, which was a big hit in Puerto Rico. During the filming of the movie, he met actress Angela Alvarado who would later become his wife.

In 1994 after his split with former band Maggie’s Dream he released Frío, creating a new sound in the Hispanic rock scene. In 1996, he released the Latino alternative rock album Vagabundo produced by Phil Manzanera before helping launch Ricky Martin's musical career into a new global setting with Vuelve. Rosa wrote and produced various of Martin's hit singles including "María", "Livin' la Vida Loca", "She's All I Ever Had", "The Cup of Life", "She Bangs" and "Shake Your Bon-Bon", among others. Rosa toured with Lenny Kravitz during the summer of 2004 to promote his concept album Mad Love.

In April 2011, Rosa was diagnosed with a non-Hodgkin lymphoma cancer near his liver. He underwent alternative and traditional treatment in Houston and Santa Monica. This kept Rosa in a hiatus for almost a year until his return in March 2012, when he started recording his latest album with Vida, and gave a concert with Juan Luis Guerra and Rubén Blades at the José Miguel Agrelot Coliseum. In December 2012, he was declared cancer-free. In December 2013, Rosa's manager confirmed his cancer had relapsed, and he overcame cancer once again after a second bone marrow transplant, but had to remain in quarantine for four additional months. As of February 2019, Rosa has been cancer-free.

== Early life ==
Rosa was born Robert Edward Rosa Suárez on Long Island, New York, to Puerto Rican parents, Norberto Rosa and Sonia Suárez. At a young age, he moved with his family to Puerto Rico where he spent much of his childhood in the town of Ponce.

== Career ==
=== Early years (1970s and 1980s) ===
In 1984, Rosa joined the increasingly popular Puerto Rican boy band Menudo. During much of his tenure with the group, he would share the stage with a young Ricky Martin, which would eventually lead to a musical partnership between the two that proved instrumental in launching Martin's solo career. As the only member of Menudo who had a native grasp of English, Rosa sang lead vocals on many of the English-language tracks released by the group, including their stateside hit, "Hold Me". However, Rosa started to grow disenchanted with the band, particularly after he was denied the opportunity to write songs for them. Rosa quit the group in 1987.

After moving to Barra Beach, Rio de Janeiro, Rosa spent time with local artists, adding to his musical education. He would go on to release two commercially successful Portuguese-language solo albums in quick succession in the late 1980s.

Rosa subsequently moved to Los Angeles where he had gotten the lead-role in the film Salsa. During its filming, Rosa met his future wife, Angela Alvarado. Like Rosa, Alvarado was also born in New York to Puerto Rican parents. Rosa also appeared alongside Christopher Mitchum in a German film entitled Gummibärchen küßt man nicht. Rosa wrote, produced and performed two songs ("Angela" and "Little Woman") for the soundtrack of the latter film, which was released by RCA Records under his publishing company, Ceiba Tree Music.

However, he would soon move back to his birth state of New York, where he formed the band Maggie's Dream, an alternative funk rock/metal band who released a self-titled album in 1990 and toured with Fishbone, the Black Crowes and Faith No More. A planned follow-up album, Elysium was recorded in 1992 but never officially released.

=== Rise to individual success (1990s) ===
In 1993, a solo contract with Sony Music Latin enabled Rosa to record in Spain the first of his Spanish-language solo albums, Frío.

In between solo projects, Rosa worked on Ricky Martin's A Medio Vivir under the pseudonym Ian Blake by co-writing and co-producing the majority of the songs on the album, including the hit single "María", which made it to the Billboard Top 10.

The 1996 release of his second album, Vagabundo, recorded in England and produced by Roxy Music guitarist Phil Manzanera, has been hailed as a "tour de force of introspective haunting tunes". The video for the song "Madre Tierra", directed by Angela Alvarado, won Best Rock Video in the 1997 Billboard Latin Music Awards; Vagabundo was included in Spin magazine's 1997 top 10 list of "greatest rock en español records of all time".

Entertainment Weekly named Rosa to their IT LIST of the 100 most creative people in the entertainment industry.

An English-language version of Frío, entitled Songbirds and Roosters was released in 1998. As he toured with his songs from Vagabundo, Rosa wrote and recorded his fellow former Menudo bandmate, Ricky Martin's chart-topping album Vuelve, again under the pseudonym Ian Blake, which resulted in five hit singles including "The Cup of Life" (as well as its Spanish version "La Copa de la Vida"). Rosa formed Phantom Vox Corporation, a multimedia production company that joined Dräco Cornelius Music with other writers under Phantom Vox Publishing, the company's subdivision for licensing of original compositions. Phantom Vox Studios, Rosa's own multimedia recording studio and another subdivision of the company, worked as Music Supervisor for Livin' the Life, an independent movie that won the Best Film Award in the 1999 New York Latin Film Fest. Phantom Vox filmed and edited the video for "Commitment #4", a track Rosa composed and recorded in dedication to the removal of the United States Navy from the island–municipality of Vieques, for bombing training in many parts of the island.

=== As a producer (1998–2002) ===
Between 1998 and 1999, Rosa wrote and recorded Ricky Martin's second eponymous album and the first in English, which includes the popular single "Livin' la Vida Loca". The album debuted at No. 1 on the Billboard album charts, selling 22 million copies worldwide. For Martin's follow-up album, Sound Loaded, Rosa produced four tracks, including the hit single "She Bangs". The album was nominated for the Grammy Award for Best Pop Vocal Album at the 42nd Grammy Awards. It won the American Music Award for Favorite Latin Artist and was nominated for the Favorite Pop/Rock Male Artist. It was also nominated for the Juno Award for International Album of the Year at the Juno Awards of 2000. The album has sold over 22 million copies, worldwide.

Rosa also produced Corazón (1999), the platinum album of Ednita Nazario, for which he also wrote and produced the song "Más Grande Que Grande" under the name Dolores del Infante, which reached a spot in the Top 10 Latin Billboards for 10 weeks. Corazón was nominated for the 2000 Billboard Latin Music Award for Female Pop Album of the Year. Rosa wrote and produced three songs for singer Julio Iglesias' album Noche De Cuatro Lunas (2000).

Rosa was one of three singer/songwriters honored in Banco Popular's Christmas Special Encuentro (2002) alongside Juan Luis Guerra and Rubén Blades.

=== Compilation albums and seventh and eighth studio albums (2002–2008) ===
In 2002, Rosa released "Libertad del Alma", a compilation album which debuted at the top of the Latin Album Billboard chart based only on its sales in Puerto Rico. After two years of experimentation and sessions in studios around the world, Rosa released Mad Love on March 30, 2004. With most songs in English, collaborations with musicians from all over the world and the music videos for "Dancing in the Rain" and "Lie Without a Lover" (both directed by Angela Alvarado Rosa), Mad Love debuted at No. 2 on Billboard's Heatseeker charts and was considered the No. 1 Latin album of 2004 by New York's Newsday. The video for "Más y Más", also directed by Alvarado, won the 2004 Latin Grammy Award for Best Video.

A few months after the release of Mad Love, Rosa released another compilation album intended specifically for the Latin market titled "Como Me Acuerdo", which included four new tracks along with some other songs. He went on an international tour to promote both albums. During the tour he visited several major US cities, as well as Japan, Singapore, England, Spain, Germany, Denmark, Panama, Brazil, Colombia and Argentina, among others. In Bogotá, Colombia in particular, he closed the 2004 Rock al Parque, a multitudinous all-day musical extravaganza with a crowd of 150,000 people.

Rosa ended the tour in his native Puerto Rico, where he sold out the island's recently opened new 18,000-seat arena, José Miguel Agrelot Coliseum. Titled "Draco al Natural", the concert was the basis for a CD/DVD, offering a full-length documentary of the live performance directed by Rosa's wife, Angela Alvarado, and released in 2005. Rosa also presented sold-out concerts at Centro de Bellas Artes in September of that year. After this, his contract with Sony Records ended and he released his second album in Spanish titled Vino in 2008, which Rosa considers as the follow-up album to Vagabundo and is included in his production Draco: Limited Collector's Edition, along with the Teatro Live DVD.

=== Amor Vincit Omnia (2009–2011) ===
Rosa yet again honored his roots in 2009 with the release of Amor Vincit Omnia (Love Conquers All). A collection of songs with a heavy influence of Puerto Rican folk music. Songs like "Esto es Vida", "Amores de mi Calle" and "Espejismo" have the old-school feel of mountain music of yesteryear. The critically acclaimed album received a 2010 Grammy nomination for "Best Latin Rock Alternative Album" and received the Rock Record of the Year at Premios Lo Nuestro 2011 with two other nominations for Artist and Song of the Year. A successful tour followed culminating in Rock in Rio in Madrid, where Rosa shared the main stage with Jane's Addiction and Rage Against the Machine.

=== Stage comeback and Vida (2012–2014) ===
On January 28, 2012, Rosa made a comeback to the public light after his long absence due to cancer treatment to announce a concert in which he will be sharing the stage with Juan Luis Guerra and Rubén Blades. The concert took place on March 30, 2012, at the José Miguel Agrelot Coliseum. Last time the three collaborated was nearly ten years before in the Banco Popular Christmas special Encuentro in 2002. In memory of that event, Rosa's comeback was entitled "Encuentro". Angelo Medina, producer of the event, announced on February 24, 2012, that the concert was quickly sold out and a second concert was added for March 31.

Both concerts premiered two of the multiple the collaborations planned for Rosa's next album. Guerra joined Rosa in "Esto Es Vida" and then Blades with "El Tiempo Va" alongside Draco Rosa. Both shows were such big hits that rumors quickly rose about two concerts that would have taken place in Dominican Republic and Panama, home places of Juan Luis Guerra and Rubén Blades respectively.

On October 16, 2012, Rosa's manager and friend Angelo Medina announced that the release date of Draco Rosa's new album Vida had been pushed back from November 13, 2012, to February 2013 due to Rosa entering quarantine after a bone marrow transplant months before. "He's fine, he spent several months in the hospital, he was discharged and is at home in this process they call quarantine, but for 80 days, which fall due in December. Draco has been two years in this process and I am impressed by how brave he has faced the disease", said the producer.

As a thank you to messages of hope and recovery, Rosa released the music video to an unpublished version of his own rendition of "Silent Night" in both English and Spanish on December 23, 2012, filmed at his California residence.

The first official single of Vida was released on January 6, 2013. The highly anticipated duet between Draco Rosa and fellow ex-Menudo member and long-time friend Ricky Martin on "Más y Más" was released on iTunes weeks after Draco's quarantine expired and was declared cancer-free on December 31, 2012. "After so many years of writing and doing projects together, I felt that the right right thing was this should be the first single. Ricky is one of the main artists with whom I've worked with, so it was a great idea to do such a pretty duet. It's that kind of things that are destined to happen", said Draco. Also, on said date, after completing his quarantine, Draco was declared cancer-free. A final statement was released on January 10, 2013, announcing that the official release date of Vida had been pushed back an additional month since Angelo Medina's October 2012 statement. The album's final release date would be March 19, 2013.

Although both artists are not seen in person for many years, Draco said Ricky was one of the many friends who gave him support in one of the most difficult stages that he lives, who has been fighting cancer for the past two years. As part of the new projects, Draco and Ricky participated together in the recording of the single's music video in New York under the direction of Carlos Pérez.

Vida was recorded in Spain, England, Mexico, Argentina, United States and Puerto Rico.

The 2013 edition of the San Sebastian St. Festival, considered to be Puerto Rico's final Christmas celebration, was dedicated to Draco for his outstanding career.

The first live performance of the album took place at Premios Lo Nuestro 2013 where Draco and Ricky Martin shared the stage to perform live their single "Más y Más" for the first time since they were both in Menudo.

On April 23, 2013, previous to the 2013 Billboard Latin Music Awards, Draco received the first Premio Conquistador given by the Latin Songwriters Hall of Fame at the New World Center in Miami and presented to him by Rubén Blades. After the presentation of the award, Draco and Rubén shared the stage to perform a duet of "El Tiempo Va", included in Vida. Two days after, Draco and Mexican band Maná performed "Penélope" together at the 2013 Billboard Latin Music Awards, held at the BankUnited Center in Miami on April 25, 2013.

After making a special appearance at Alejandro Sanz's concert in Puerto Rico on May 12, 2013, in which both sang their duet of "Como Me Acuerdo", Draco and Sanz's duet was filmed and used for the music video released on October 21, 2013, which was removed from YouTube the same day.

After making his first ever appearance at the Puerto Rican Day Parade on June 9, 2013, and performing at the Copacabana in Times Square on May 11, 2013, Draco confirmed that he will film the music video for duet of "Esto Es Vida" with Juan Luis Guerra in the Dominican Republic which he appraised during his illness as one of his "best compositions". "It was a strong moment in my life. They're important parts with serious people, important", he expressed. Filming took place on June 17, 2013, at the ruins of the Engombe Sugar Mill in Santo Domingo. The video was directed by Guerra's own son, Jean Gabriel Guerra, a filmmaker. The music video was released on August 14, 2013.

Draco made his return to the stage on December 6, 2013, at the José Miguel Agrelot Coliseum with a concert entitled "Draco & Friends". Many artists who collaborated on Vida performed alongside Draco, including Juan Luis Guerra, Enrique Bunbury, Calle 13's René Pérez, Juanes and Ricky Martin. Draco announced that due to overwhelming demand, a second concert date was added for December 7, 2013, which featured other guest artists performing alongside him.

=== Book, future projects and Monte Sagrado (2015–present) ===
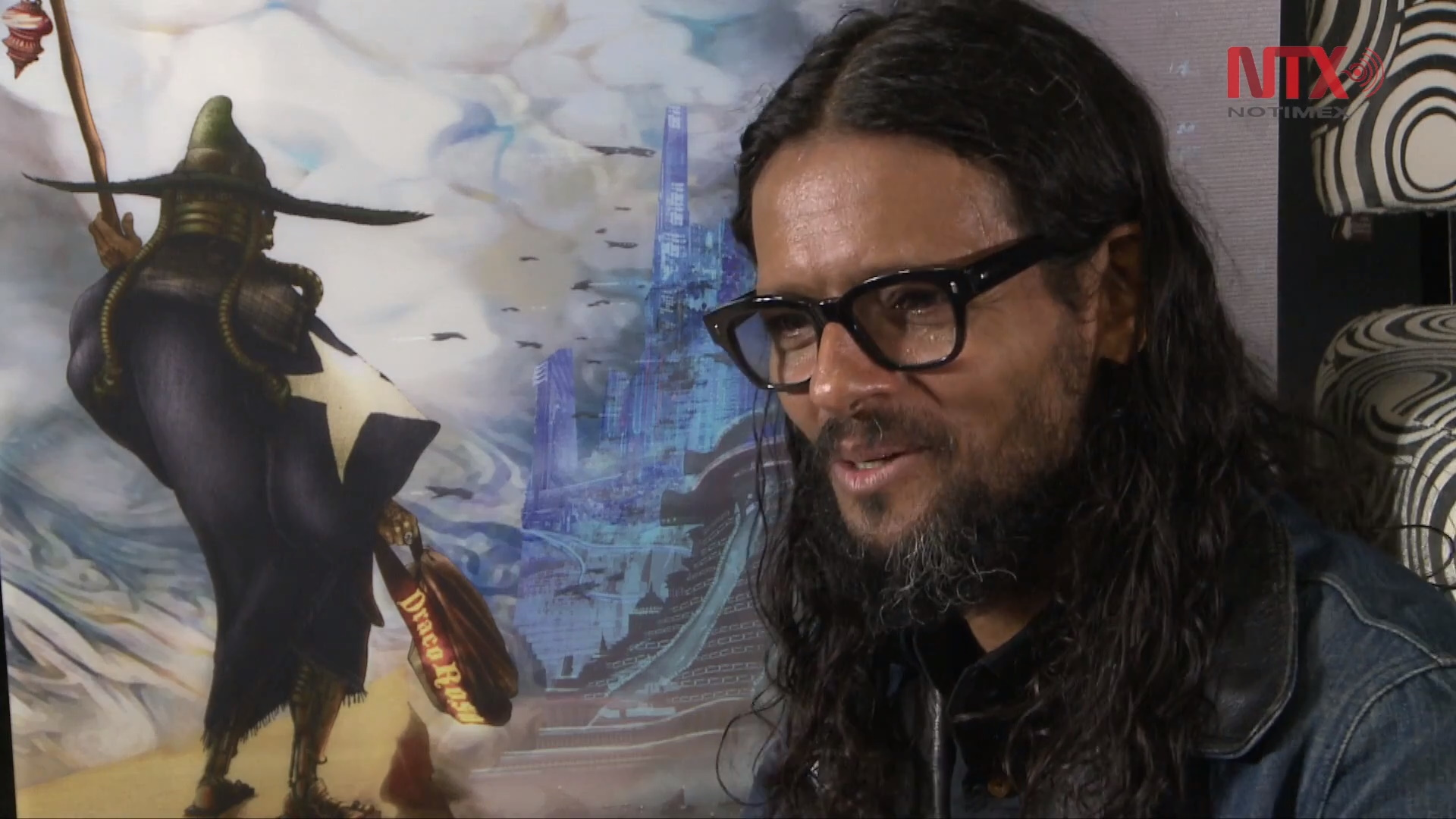
Rosa in a 2018 interview

Along with the authorship of Nena Niessen, it was announced on May 6, 2015, that Draco would release his first publication, a cookbook on nutritional and alternative cooking divided into three sections: the first devoted to fundamental ingredients for good health, the second dealing with body detox and the third with recipes easy to prepare dishes that combine a good and important nutrition detoxification. The book, entitled El Secreto de la Vida a Base De Plantas (The Secret of Life Based on Plants) was released late July 2015.

Monte Sagrado, Rosa's first album of original material in over a decade, was released on October 26, 2018. Rolling Stone's David Fricke called it "one of the (most) honest records you will hear this year — at any volume, in any language".

== Personal life ==
Rosa is fluent in Spanish, English, German and Portuguese. He was married to actress and director Angela Alvarado, whom he met during the filming of Salsa, in which they both starred in. They married in 1988 and had two sons. In June 2019, Rosa filed for divorce in Los Angeles after nearly 30 years of marriage, citing "irreconcilable differences". He currently resides in Utuado, after moving from Los Angeles.

=== Entrepreneurial life ===
Rosa owns a recording studio, an independent music label and a multimedia company under the name of Phantom Vox. He also owns Hacienda Horizonte in the mountains of Utuado, where his recording studio was relocated to and where the music videos for "Paraíso Prometido" and "Reza Por Mí" from the album Amor Vincit Omnia have been filmed. Aside from the many different projects in Utuado, Draco also created his own line of rum, Ron Vagabundo with the Serrallés Destillery; a brand of locally grown coffee, Café Horizonte and a clothing line, Vagabundo Clothing. Puerto Rico's Chamber of Commerce awarded Draco with the Zenit award as Businessman of the Year in 2011.

On December 10, 2013, Rosa was recognized by the House of Representatives of Puerto Rico at the Capitol Building of Puerto Rico for his successful career while in recovery from cancer at the recent light of his relapse.

=== Philanthropic work ===
Outside of his personal investments, musical and otherwise, he has also contributed towards the improvement of artistic and cultural life in Puerto Rico, sponsoring the Museo de Arte Contemporáneo de Puerto Rico and setting up an annual scholarship for outstanding students at the Conservatory of Music of Puerto Rico.

=== Arrest in Vieques ===
On April 9, 2001, Rosa was arrested alongside Senator Luis Gutiérrez, Edward James Olmos, Robert Kennedy Jr. and other protesters for civil disobedience when they invaded the US Navy's security zone surrounding the island-municipality of Vieques. Rosa has vehemently opposed the US Navy training missions in Vieques and has been a vocal supporter of the environmental movement and the independence movement.

=== Drug abuse ===
Shortly after leaving Menudo, Rosa started taking drugs, and often drew inspiration from hallucinogens and alcohol for his songwriting. Although this generated heavy criticism, most of his fans did not seem to be bothered by this. Rosa has always been very open about the subject, even admitting that his wife, Angela, saved his life on at least one occasion. Rosa stopped taking drugs in 2005.

=== Illness ===
On April 25, 2011, Rosa was diagnosed with cancer: a non-Hodgkin lymphoma, near his liver. He followed several alternative treatments, such as high vitamin C doses or neoplasm treatment at the Burzynski Clinic in Houston. Finally, he underwent conventional treatments of chemotherapy and bone marrow transplantation. He was under quarantine in his California home until December 31, 2012, when Draco completed his quarantine and was declared cancer-free. On May 30, 2013, Rosa tweeted that his recent cancer study resulted negative, confirming he is completely cured of cancer. His tweet read: "Familia: I went in yesterday for a pet scan. Today my results came in; I'm free. So happy!! #cancerfree #celebration#love #faith #gratitude" [sic].

On December 9, 2013, Rosa's manager confirmed that Draco's cancer had relapsed in a press conference for the World's Best 10K on February 23, 2014. A routine test taken while on tour, led to the diagnosis of a diffuse B-cell lymphoma, non-Hodgkin type, which his doctors consider he may recover from again. Draco himself told his manager the night of the 2013 Latin Grammys. Rosa was declared again cancer-free on January 5, 2014. Rosa initially had planned to participate at the 10K on behalf of a nine-year-old patient, who was recovering from a bone marrow transplant but his own recovery and quarantine prevented Rosa from participating. Rosa, instead, sent his wife Angela and son Redamo in his place. On February 26, Draco commenced his second bone marrow transplant in California and remained in quarantine for a course of four months before being declared cancer-free once again.

On August 23, 2018, Rosa announced by way of a video post on Instagram that after his last check-up examinations he is completely cancer-free, information that was corroborated by his manager Wanda Troche. Rosa celebrated his fifth cancer-free anniversary in another Instagram post from February 28, 2019.

== Discography ==
With Menudo

- Reaching Out (1984)
- Manía (1984)
- Evolución (1984)
- Menudo (1985)
- Explosion (1985) (Note: Japanese album.)
- Ayer y Hoy (1985)
- A Festa Vai Começar (1985)
- Viva! Bravo! (1986)
- Refrescante (1986)
- Can't Get Enough (1986)

With Maggie's Dream

- Maggie's Dream (1990)

Solo

- Robby (1988) [as Robby]
- Robby (a.k.a. Ser Feliz) (1989) [as Robby]
- Frío (1994)
- Vagabundo (1996)
- Songbirds & Roosters (1998)
- Libertad del Alma (2001)
- Mad Love (2004)
- Como Me Acuerdo (2004)
- Draco y El Teatro del Absurdo (2007)
- Vino (2008)
- Amor Vincit Omnia (2009)
- Vida (2013)
- Monte Sagrado (2018)
- Sound Healing 1:11 (2021)
- Reflejos De Lo Eterno (2024)

Live albums

- Draco Al Natural (2005)
- Teatro Live (2008)
- 731 Ensayos Al Natural (2009)
- Life After Vida (2023)

Extended Plays

- La Pena Negra (2011)
- Forest of Numbers (Rock It!) (2012)

Experimental works

- Heronepheus "King of the Void" (2011)

Soundtracks

- Salsa: Original Motion Picture Soundtrack (1988)
- Encuentro (2002)

=== Singles ===
List of singles as lead artist, with selected chart positions, showing year released and album name
| Title | Year | Peak chart positions | | | | | Album |
| Title | Year | US Latin | US Latin Digi. | US Latin Air. | US Latin Pop | US Tropical | Album |
|---|---|---|---|---|---|---|---|
| "Madre Tierra" | 1996 | — | — | — | — | — | Vagabundo |
| "Vagabundo" | 1996 | — | — | — | — | — | Vagabundo |
| "Para No Olvidar" | 1997 | — | — | — | — | — | Vagabundo |
| "Penelope" | 1997 | — | — | — | 17 | — | Vagabundo |
| "Vivir" | 1997 | — | — | — | — | — | Vagabundo |
| "Amantes Hasta El Fin" | 1997 | — | — | — | — | — | Vagabundo |
| "Como Me Acuerdo" | 2002 | — | — | — | 38 | | Libertad Del Alma |
| "Nymph (Casi Una Diosa)" | 2002 | — | — | — | — | 37 | Libertad Del Alma |
| "Dancing In the Rain" | 2004 | — | — | — | — | — | Mad Love |
| "Lie Without a Lover" | 2004 | — | — | — | — | — | Mad Love |
| "Try Me" | 2004 | — | — | — | — | — | Mad Love |
| "Crash Push" | 2005 | — | — | — | — | — | Mad Love |
| "This Time" | 2005 | — | — | — | — | — | Mad Love |
| "Commitment #4" | 2005 | — | — | — | — | — | Mad Love |
| "Luchar Por Ella" | 2007 | — | — | — | 38 | — | Vino |
| "Desnudo (Happy)" | 2008 | — | — | — | — | — | Vino |
| "Te Fumare" | 2008 | — | — | — | — | — | Vino |
| "Sueño Contigo" | 2008 | — | — | — | — | — | Vino |
| "Esto Es Vida" | 2009 | 47 | — | 47 | 20 | — | Amor Vincit Omnia |
| "Penelope" (Duet version with Maná) | 2012 | — | 48 | — | — | — | Vida |
| "Mas y Mas" (Duet version with Ricky Martin) | 2013 | 27 | 24 | 28 | 9 | — | Vida |
| "Reza Por Mi" (Duet version with Romeo Santos) | 2013 | — | 48 | — | — | — | Vida |
| "Esto Es Vida" (Duet version with Juan Luis Guerra) | 2013 | — | — | — | — | — | Vida |
| "Amantes Hasta El Fin" (Duet version with Ednita Nazario) | 2014 | — | — | 42 | — | — | Vida |

== Tours ==
- Más Allá del Rock
- Re-Vive el Teatro
- Draco Rosa: Libre, Natural, Puro
- Mad Love Tour
- Draco y su Paraíso
- Vagabundo Por El Mundo World Tour
- Amor Vincit Omnia
- Vida World Tour
- Lo Sagrado y Lo Maldito Tour

== Filmography ==
| Year | Title | Role | Notes |
|---|---|---|---|
| 1988 | Salsa | Rico | |
| 1989 | Gummibärchen küßt man nicht | Peter | German film. English: Real men don't eat gummy bears |
| 1999 | Livin' the Life | —N/a | Musical director |
| 2002 | Encuentro | Himself/performer | Banco Popular television Christmas special, alongside Rubén Blades and Juan Luis Guerra |
| 2005 | Draco Al Natural | Himself/performer | Live concert film |
| 2007 | Draco: Limited Collector's Edition | Himself | Visual album |
| 2008 | Teatro Live | Himself/performer | Live concert film |
| 2021 | Gordon Ramsay: Uncharted | Himself | Season 3, Episode 5: "Lush and Wild Puerto Rico" |

== Composer and producer ==
| Year | Artist | Album |
|---|---|---|
| 1998 | Ricky Martin | Vuelve |
| 1999 | Ricky Martin | Ricky Martin |
| 1999 | Ednita Nazario | Corazón |
| 2000 | Ricky Martin | Sound Loaded |
| 2000 | Julio Iglesias | Noche De Cuatro Lunas |

== Books ==
Rosa, Draco; Niessen, Nena (2015). El Secreto de la Vida a Base De Plantas [The Secret of Plant-Based Life] (in Spanish). Puerto Rico: Penguin Random House. ISBN 978-1-941999-46-2.

== Awards and nominations ==
Grammy Awards

The Grammy Award is an accolade by the National Academy of Recording Arts and Sciences of the United States to recognize outstanding achievement on the music industry.

| Year | Nominee / work | Award | Result |
|---|---|---|---|
| 2000 | "Livin' la Vida Loca" | Record of the Year (as producer) | Nominated |
| 2000 | "Livin' la Vida Loca" | Song of the Year (as songwriter) | Nominated |
| 2011 | Amor Vincit Omnia | Best Latin Rock, Urban or Alternative Album | Nominated |
| 2014 | Vida | Best Latin Pop Album | Won |

Latin Grammy Awards

A Latin Grammy Award is an accolade by the Latin Academy of Recording Arts & Sciences to recognize outstanding achievement in the Latin music industry.

| Year | Nominee / work | Award | Result |
|---|---|---|---|
| 2004 | "Más y Más" | Record of the Year | Nominated |
| 2004 | "Más y Más" | Song of the Year | Nominated |
| 2004 | "Más y Más" | Best Music Video | Won |
| 2009 | Teatro | Best Rock Solo Vocal Album | Won |
| 2009 | Teatro | Best Long Form Music Video | Nominated |
| 2013 | "Más y Más" (feat. Ricky Martin) | Record of the Year | Nominated |
| 2013 | Vida | Album of the Year | Won |
| 2013 | Vida | Best Contemporary Pop Vocal Album | Nominated |
| 2019 | Monte Sagrado | Best Rock Album | Won |
| 2019 | "Hotel De Los Encuentros" | Best Long Form Music Video | Nominated |

Lo Nuestro Awards

Lo Nuestro Awards (Spanish: Premios Lo Nuestro) is an awards show honoring the best of Latin music, presented by television network Univision.

| Year | Nominee / work | Award | Result |
|---|---|---|---|
| 2011 | Amor Vincit Omnia | Album of the Year: Rock | Won |
| 2011 | Himself | Artist of the Year: Rock | Nominated |
| 2011 | "Esto Es Vida" | Song of the Year: Rock | Nominated |

== See also ==
- List of Puerto Ricans
