= Hooterization: A Retrospective =

Compilation album by the Hooters
- Released: September 3, 1996
- Recorded: 1985–1989
- Genre: Rock
- Length: 69:43
- Label: Columbia
- Producers: Rick Chertoff; Eric Bazilian; Rob Hyman

The Hooters chronology
The Hooters Live (1994)	Hooterization: A Retrospective (1996)	Time Stand Still (2007)

Professional ratings
Review scores
Source	Rating
AllMusic	4/5 stars

Hooterization: A Retrospective is a compilation album by American rock band the Hooters and was released in 1996 by Columbia Records.

== Background ==
Hooterization: A Retrospective contains songs from the Hooters' three albums on Columbia Records: Nervous Night (1985), One Way Home (1987) and Zig Zag (1989).

It also contains two live songs recorded in 1985 that were previously unavailable on the band's albums: a cover version of the Beatles' "Lucy in the Sky with Diamonds" and "Time After Time," which band member Rob Hyman co-wrote with Cyndi Lauper and earned him a Grammy Award nomination for Song of the Year in 1984.

== Track listing ==
No.	Title	Writer(s)	Original release	Length
1.	"And We Danced"	Rob Hyman, Eric Bazilian	Nervous Night, 1985	3:49
2.	"Nervous Night"	Hyman, Bazilian, Rick Chertoff	Nervous Night	3:57
3.	"All You Zombies"	Hyman, Bazilian	Nervous Night	5:57
4.	"Satellite"	Hyman, Bazilian, Chertoff	One Way Home, 1987	4:15
5.	"Karla with a K"	Hyman, Bazilian, John Lilley, Andy King, David Uosikkinen	One Way Home	4:40
6.	"Where Do the Children Go"	Hyman, Bazilian	Nervous Night	5:28
7.	"500 Miles"	Hedy West; additional lyrics by Hyman, Bazilian, Chertoff	Zig Zag, 1989	4:24
8.	"Fightin' on the Same Side"	Hyman, Bazilian, Chertoff	One Way Home	4:07
9.	"Day by Day"	Hyman, Bazilian, Chertoff	Nervous Night	3:25
10.	"Lucy in the Sky with Diamonds" (live)	John Lennon, Paul McCartney	B-side to "Johnny B", 1987	3:55
11.	"Heaven Laughs"	Hyman, Bazilian, Chertoff	Zig Zag	4:18
12.	"Brother, Don't You Walk Away"	Hyman, Bazilian, Chertoff	Zig Zag	4:27
13.	"Johnny B"	Hyman, Bazilian, Chertoff	One Way Home	3:59
14.	"She Comes in Colors"	Arthur Lee	Nervous Night	4:15
15.	"Time After Time" (live)	Hyman, Cyndi Lauper	previously unreleased in the US	4:39
16.	"Beat Up Guitar"	Hyman, Bazilian	Zig Zag	4:08

Note

- Tracks 10 and 15 were recorded live at the Tower Theater in Upper Darby Township, Pennsylvania, on October 20, 1985.

== Personnel ==
Adapted from the album liner notes.

The Hooters

- Eric Bazilian – lead vocals, guitar, bass, mandolin, saxophone
- Rob Hyman – lead vocals, keyboards, accordion
- David Uosikkinen – drums
- John Lilley – guitar
- Andy King – bass, vocals, lead vocal (track 10)
- Fran Smith Jr. – bass, vocals (tracks 7, 11, 12, 16)

Additional musicians

- Patty Smyth – vocals ("Where Do The Children Go")
- Peter, Paul and Mary – backing vocals ("500 Miles")

Technical

- Rick Chertoff – producer
- Eric Bazilian – co-producer (One Way Home, Zig Zag)
- Rob Hyman – co-producer (One Way Home, Zig Zag)
- William Wittman – engineer, mixing (Nervous Night)
- John Agnello – engineer (Nervous Night, Zig Zag)
- Phil Nicolo – engineer (One Way Home, Zig Zag)
- Dave Thoerner – engineer, mixing (One Way Home), mixing ("And We Danced")
- Rod O'Brien – engineer (One Way Home)
- Steve Churchyard – mixing (Zig Zag)
- George Marino – mastering
- Chris Athens – digital remastering
- Josh Cheuse – art direction
