= Both Sides Live =

Live album by the Hooters
- Released: November 26, 2008 (Europe) April 24, 2009
- Recorded: November 21 and 23, 2007, February 28 and March 1, 2008
- Venues: Electric Factory, Philadelphia, Pennsylvania; Elm Street Studios, Conshohocken, Pennsylvania
- Genres: Rock; acoustic
- Length: 1:58:46
- Labels: Hooters Music (Europe) Neo/Sony BMG
- Producers: Eric Bazilian; Rob Hyman

The Hooters chronology
Time Stand Still (2007)	Both Sides Live (2008)	Five by Five (2010)

Professional ratings
Review scores
Source	Rating
AllMusic	3.5/5 stars

Both Sides Live is a 2-CD live album by American rock band the Hooters, released in November 2008.

== Background ==
Both Sides Live contains 25 tracks recorded live in Philadelphia, with 13 songs being electric songs recorded at the Electric Factory on November 21 and 23, 2007 during the band's traditional Thanksgiving holiday concerts, and 12 acoustic songs recorded on February 28 and March 1, 2008 at keyboard player Rob Hyman's Elm Street Studios in front of a small studio audience.

== Track listing ==
Disc 1 – The Electric Factory
No.	Title	Writer(s)	Length
1.	"I'm Alive"	Rob Hyman, Eric Bazilian	3:56
2.	"Time Stand Still"	Hyman, Bazilian	3:59
3.	"South Ferry Road"	Hyman, Bazilian, Rick Chertoff	3:49
4.	"All You Zombies"	Hyman, Bazilian	6:12
5.	"The Boys of Summer"	Don Henley, Mike Campbell	4:51
6.	"Johnny B"	Hyman, Bazilian, Chertoff	6:31
7.	"Where the Wind May Blow"	Hyman, Bazilian	3:49
8.	"Karla with a K"	Hyman, Bazilian, John Lilley, Andy King, David Uosikkinen	5:54
9.	"25 Hours a Day"	Hyman, Bazilian, Jerry Lynn Williams	4:23
10.	"Satellite"	Hyman, Bazilian, Chertoff	4:34
11.	"And We Danced"	Hyman, Bazilian	4:56
12.	"Day by Day"	Hyman, Bazilian, Chertoff	3:52
13.	"Free Again"	Hyman, Bazilian	7:40

Disc 2 – The Secret Sessions (acoustic)
No.	Title	Writer(s)	Length
1.	"Introduction"		0:37
2.	"25 Hours a Day"	Hyman, Bazilian, Williams	3:37
3.	"All You Zombies"	Hyman, Bazilian	5:44
4.	"Time Stand Still"	Hyman, Bazilian	4:14
5.	"Johnny B"	Hyman, Bazilian, Chertoff	4:05
6.	"Morning Buzz"	Hyman, Bazilian	3:43
7.	"Satellite"	Hyman, Bazilian, Chertoff	4:58
8.	"The Boys of Summer"	Henley, Campbell	5:03
9.	"Day By Day"	Hyman, Bazilian, Chertoff	3:55
10.	"Ordinary Lives"	Hyman, Bazilian, Lilley	5:03
11.	"Karla with a K"	Hyman, Bazilian, Lilley, King, Uosikkinen	5:02
12.	"I'm Alive"	Hyman, Bazilian	3:58
13.	"And We Danced"	Hyman, Bazilian	4:31

== Personnel ==
Adapted from the album liner notes.

The Hooters

- Eric Bazilian – lead vocals, guitar, mandolin, recorder, harmonica, banjo
- Rob Hyman – lead vocals, keyboards, accordion, melodica
- David Uosikkinen – drums, percussion
- John Lilley – guitar, mandolin, dobro
- Fran Smith Jr. – bass, backing vocals

Additional musician

- Ann Marie Calhoun – violin, backing vocals (Secret Sessions)

Technical

- Eric Bazilian – producer, mixing, additional engineer
- Rob Hyman – producer, mixing
- Michael Comstock – engineer (Electric Factory)
- Michael Richelle – assistant engineer (Electric Factory)
- John O. Senior – engineer (Secret Sessions), mixing
- Bill Hayward – assistant engineer (Secret Sessions)
- Daniel Chertoff – assistant engineer (Secret Sessions)
- Rick Chertoff – "production guru" (Secret Sessions)
- Paul Hammond – "technical guru" (Secret Sessions)
- George Marino – mastering (at Sterling Sound)
- Graham Perry/NCS Studios – art direction, design
- Mark Tassoni – photography (Electric Factory)
- Brigitte Morgenstern – photography (Electric Factory)
- Thomas Collins – photography (Electric Factory)
- Jan Klug-Offermann – photography (Electric Factory)
- Dani Heim – photography (Secret Sessions)
