= Greatest Hits (The Hooters album) =

Greatest hits album by The Hooters
- Released: (Europe) 1992; October 26, 1993
- Genre: Rock
- Length: 61:45
- Label: (Europe) Columbia; Sony BMG

The Hooters chronology
Zig Zag (1989)	Greatest Hits (1992)	Out of Body (1993)

Professional ratings
Review scores
Source	Rating
AllMusic	3/5 stars

Greatest Hits is a compilation album by the American rock band, The Hooters released in 1992.

== Background ==
Greatest Hits contains songs from The Hooters' three albums on Columbia Records: Nervous Night (1985), One Way Home (1987) and Zig Zag (1989).

== Track listing ==
1. "All You Zombies" (Rob Hyman, Eric Bazilian) – 5:57
2. "Satellite" (Rob Hyman, Eric Bazilian, Rick Chertoff) – 4:15
3. "And We Danced" (Rob Hyman, Eric Bazilian) – 3:48
4. "500 Miles" (Hedy West, additional lyrics by Rob Hyman, Eric Bazilian, Rick Chertoff) – 4:24
5. "Don't Knock It 'Til You Try It" (Rob Hyman, Eric Bazilian) – 4:17
6. "Day by Day" (Rob Hyman, Eric Bazilian, Rick Chertoff) – 3:25
7. "Where Do the Children Go" (Rob Hyman, Eric Bazilian) – 5:28
8. "Johnny B" (Rob Hyman, Eric Bazilian, Rick Chertoff) – 3:59
9. "Fightin' on the Same Side" (Rob Hyman, Eric Bazilian, Rick Chertoff) – 4:07
10. "Brother, Don't You Walk Away" (Rob Hyman, Eric Bazilian, Rick Chertoff) – 4:27
11. "Karla With a K" (The Hooters) – 4:40
12. "Nervous Night" (Rob Hyman, Eric Bazilian, Rick Chertoff) – 3:57
13. "Give The Music Back" (Rob Hyman, Eric Bazilian) – 5:15
14. "Mr. Big Baboon'" (Rob Hyman, Eric Bazilian, Rick Chertoff) – 3:54

== Charts ==
Chart (1992)	Peak position
Germany GfK Entertainment Charts	21
Sweden Sverigetopplistan	21
Norway VG-lista	6
