= Nervous Night =

1986 film by John Jopson

- Directed by: John Charles Jopson
- Produced by: Karen Bellone
- Starring: The Hooters
- Cinematography: Julio Macat; Anastas Michos
- Music by: The Hooters
- Distributed by: CBS/Fox Video
- Release date: October 10, 1986
- Running time: 42 minutes
- Country: United States
- Language: English

Nervous Night is a 1986 film starring American rock band The Hooters and directed by John Charles Jopson.

== Background ==
As a follow-up to The Hooters' 1985 Columbia Records debut album Nervous Night, a film of the same title was produced by Bell One Productions. Nervous Night was shot on 35mm film and intercuts two separate elements: a concert filmed at the Tower Theater outside Philadelphia, and a series of short films, each one starring a different band member.

The highly stylized short films were shot on days off while the band toured the Pacific Northwest and includes scenes filmed in San Francisco, Portland, and Seattle. The concert includes performances of their hit songs "All You Zombies," "Time After Time" (a No. 1 song for Cyndi Lauper that was co-written by band member Rob Hyman), "And We Danced," and "Day By Day."

The VHS release by CBS/Fox Video did not contain the short films; however, portions of the shorts were included in the "Day By Day" music video. MTV aired the version with the short films in the summer of 1986 as part of their Feature Presentation series.

== Track listing ==
No.	Title	Length
1.	"And We Danced"
2.	"Hanging On A Heartbeat"
3.	"Don't Take My Car Out Tonight"
4.	"Where Do the Children Go"
5.	"All You Zombies"
6.	"Blood From A Stone"
7.	"Time After Time"
8.	"Nervous Night"
9.	"Day By Day"

Notes

- Tracks 2 to 8 are recorded live in concert at the Tower Theater outside Philadelphia. Tracks 1 and 9 are music videos.

== Short film titles ==
- "Puck Interlude I" (Rob Hyman)
- "Time Goes Bye" (Andy King)
- "A Quiet Room" (John Lilley)
- "All God's Creatures" (Eric Bazilian)

== Awards ==
At Billboard's 8th Annual Video Music Conference on November 22, 1986, The Hooters received two awards for Nervous Night: Best Longform Program and Best Concert Performance for the "Where Do the Children Go" (the music video was taken from the film).

== Personnel ==
The Hooters

- Eric Bazilian - lead vocals, guitar, mandolin
- Rob Hyman - lead vocals, keyboards, accordion
- David Uosikkinen - drums
- John Lilley - guitar
- Andy King - bass guitar, vocals
