= Karla with a K =

Single by The Hooters

from the album One Way Home
- B-side: "Washington's Day"
- Released: 1987
- Genre: Pop rock
- Length: 3:53 (7" version), 4:41 (album version)
- Label: Columbia/CBS
- Songwriter: The Hooters
- Producer: Rick Chertoff

The Hooters singles chronology
"Satellite" (1987)	"Karla with a K" (1987)	"Engine 999" (1988)

Music video
- "Karla with a K" on YouTube

"Karla with a K" is a song by Philadelphia band The Hooters from their 1987 album One Way Home. The single charted in the UK, reaching number 81 on January 23, 1988, and was on the chart for 4 weeks. In the United States, the 12" single was released as a promo. The song plays at 101 BPM in 4/4 time signature. The song has later appeared on some of the band's compilation albums such as Definitive Collection in 1995 and Playlist: The Very Best of the Hooters in 2012.

== Personnel ==
- Eric Bazilian – lead vocals, electric guitar, bass guitar, mandolin
- Rob Hyman – accordion, harmony vocals
- John Lilley – electric guitar
- David Uosikkinen – drums

== Charts ==
Chart (1988)	Peak position
UK Singles Chart (OCC)	81
