= Amore =

Amore is the Italian word for "love". It may come from Amare which is "to love" in Latin. It may also refer to:

== People ==
- Amore Bekker – South African radio personality and writer
- Alexis Amore, pornographic actress
- Enzo Amore – American professional wrestler and rapper (born 1986)
- Eugenio Amore, Italian beach volleyball player
- Gianna Amore, Playboy centerfold
- Gregg Amore, Secretary of State of Rhode Island

== Film and TV ==
- Amore!, a 1993 American film
- L'Amore (film), 1948 Italian film directed by Roberto Rossellini
- Amore (1936 film), a 1936 Italian film Carlo Ludovico Bragaglia
- Amore (1974 film), a 1974 French film directed by Henry Chapier

== Music ==
=== Albums ===
- Amore (Alessandra Mussolini album), a 1982 album by Alessandra Mussolini
- Amore (Andrea Bocelli album), a 2006 album by classical crossover singer Andrea Bocelli
- Amore (The Hooters album), a 1983 album by The Hooters
- Amore (Wanda album), 2014 debut album by Austrian band Wanda
- Sempre Amore

=== Songs and compositions ===
- "Amore", 1987 song by BZN
- "Amore", 1976 song by Krisma
- "Amore", 2016 song by Babymetal from the album Metal Resistance
- "Amore", 2018 song by Pitbull featuring Leona Lewis from the film Gotti
- "Amore", 2021 song by Bebe Rexha featuring Rick Ross from the album Better Mistakes
- "Amoré (Sexo)", a song by Santana featuring Macy Gray from the album Shaman
- "L'amore" (Sonohra song), 2008 song by Sonohra
- "L'Amore", 1966 song by Don Backy
- "L'Amore", 1973 song by Fred Bongusto
- "L'Amore", 1958 song by Tonina Torrielli
- Amore, a composition for piano by Ryuichi Sakamoto
- Amore traditore, BWV 203 – Secular cantata composed by Johann Sebastian Bach

== Other ==
- Amore Pacific, cosmetics brand of Taepyeongyang Corporation
- Partito dell'Amore, Italian political party

== See also ==
- De amore (disambiguation)
- D'Amore (disambiguation)
- Un amore (disambiguation)
- Amor (disambiguation)
- Amora (disambiguation)
- Amour (disambiguation)
- L'Amour (disambiguation)
- Mi amor (disambiguation)
- Mi amore (disambiguation)
- "That's Amore", a 1953 Dean Martin song
- Love (disambiguation), English translation of amore
