= Day by Day (The Hooters song) =

Single by the Hooters

from the album Nervous Night
- B-side: "South Ferry Road"
- Released: 1985
- Genre: Pop
- Length: 3:24
- Label: Columbia
- Songwriters: Eric Bazilian; Rob Hyman; Rick Chertoff
- Producer: Rick Chertoff

The Hooters singles chronology
"And We Danced" (1985)	"Day by Day" (1985)	"Where Do the Children Go" (1986)

Music video
- "Day by Day" on YouTube

"Day by Day" is a song by the American rock band the Hooters, co-written by band members Eric Bazilian and Rob Hyman with Rick Chertoff, who also produced the song. The song appeared on the band's second album, Nervous Night and was released as the third single in December 1985. "Day by Day" became their highest-charting song on the US Billboard Hot 100, where it peaked at No. 18.

== Release ==
"Day by Day" began receiving adds to contemporary hit radio stations in late 1985. The song entered the US Billboard Hot 100 at No. 83 for the week ending December 14, 1985. The following week, it debuted at No. 30 on the Billboard Top Rock Tracks chart based on national airplay from album oriented rock radio stations. A music video was also serviced to MTV that same month.

In the January 16, 1986, edition of Radio & Records, the publication reported that "Day by Day" had been added to 62% of all reporting contemporary hit radio stations in the United States. The following month, the song peaked at No. 18 on the Billboard Hot 100 and No. 3 on the Top Rock Tracks chart. "Day by Day" debuted on the RPM Canadian singles chart at No. 83 during the week of February 1, 1986. One month later, the song peaked at No. 66.

== Critical reception ==
Cashbox described "Day By Day" as a "straight ahead anthem-like track which chimes with a ringing chorus" that demonstrated the band's "excellent use of dynamics and innate talent for penning hit songs full of melodic hooks." Billboard said the song possessed a "singalong-style" with a "hard-driving energy and muscular mandolins". Rolling Stone highlighted the song's "stacked guitars and exultant vocal chorus".

== Charts ==
Chart (1985–1986)	Peak position
Australia (Kent Music Report)	55
Canada Top Singles (RPM)	66
US Billboard Hot 100	18
US Top Rock Tracks (Billboard)	3
