= Time Stand Still (album) =

Studio album by the Hooters
- Released: September 14, 2007 (EUR); February 5, 2008 (US)
- Recorded: October 2006 – May 2007
- Studios: Elm Street Studios, Philadelphia; Red Door Recording, Wayne
- Genre: Rock
- Length: 48:35
- Labels: Neo/Sony BMG (EUR); Megaforce/MRI Associated (US)
- Producers: Eric Bazilian; Rob Hyman

The Hooters chronology
Hooterization: A Retrospective (1996)	Time Stand Still (00000005)	Both Sides Live (2008)

Professional ratings
Review scores
Source	Rating
MelodicRock.com	VERY GOOD (80%)

Time Stand Still is the sixth studio album by the American rock band the Hooters. It was released in Europe on September 14, 2007, and released in the US on February 5, 2008.

== Background ==
The Hooters gathered in October 2006 at keyboard player Rob Hyman's Elmstreet Studios, in suburban Philadelphia, Pennsylvania, for the recording of basic tracks, followed by additional recording at guitarist Eric Bazilian's Red Door Recording studio.

Several of the songs on the album had been previewed during the Hooters' live shows in 2005 and 2006, with one of the tracks, "Until You Dare," originally recorded on Bazilian's 2000 solo album The Optimist.

There is a cover version of Don Henley's 1984 song "The Boys of Summer" that came about as a result of Hyman and Bazilian being asked to participate in a show for the VH1 Save the Music Foundation in New York City, where bands from the 1980s were asked to play their own songs while also choosing a song that they wished that they had written from the 1980s. After performing the song as part of their live shows the previous two years, they decided to record a studio version for inclusion on the album.

The final mixes were completed in May 2007.

== Release Schedule ==
The album was commercially released in Germany, Austria and Switzerland on September 14, 2007, with pre-release copies available during the band's summer tour of Europe from June through August, featuring shows in Germany, Sweden, The Netherlands and Switzerland. The album was released in the United States on February 5, 2008 and was released in other countries in early 2008.

== Track listing ==
All tracks are written by Rob Hyman and Eric Bazilian, except where noted.

No.	Title	Writer(s)	Length
1.	"I'm Alive"		4:08
2.	"Time Stand Still"		3:52
3.	"The Boys of Summer"	Don Henley; Mike Campbell	4:58
4.	"Until I Find You Again"		4:08
5.	"Until You Dare"		4:47
6.	"Morning Buzz"		3:38
7.	"Where the Wind May Blow"		3:42
8.	"Catch of the Day"		3:03
9.	"Ordinary Lives"	Hyman; Bazilian; John Lilley	5:04
10.	"Free Again"		6:54
11.	"White Jeans" (hidden track)		4:08

== Personnel ==
The Hooters

- Eric Bazilian – lead vocals, guitars, bass, mandolin, harmonica, recorder, keyboards, piano, saxophone
- Rob Hyman – lead vocals, piano, keyboards, acoustic guitar, mandolin, accordion, melodica
- John Lilley – guitar, mandolin, dobro
- Fran Smith Jr. – bass, backing vocals
- David Uosikkinen – drums

Technical

- Eric Bazilian – production
- Rob Hyman – production
- John O. Senior – engineering
- Jesse Honig – engineering assistance
- George Marino – mastering
- Paul Hammond – technician
- Graham Perry – art direction
- Lauren Lyons – photography
- Lisa Schaffer – photography
- Stephan Kohler, Hans-Georg Krumm, Candy Langbein, Douglas A. Lockard, Brigitte Morgenstern, Graham Perry – live photos
