= Zig Zag (The Hooters album) =

Studio album by the Hooters
- Released: October 26, 1989
- Recorded: 1988–89
- Studios: Studio 4, Philadelphia; Record Plant, New York City; The Hit Factory, New York City
- Genre: Rock
- Length: 38:40
- Label: Columbia
- Producers: Rick Chertoff; Eric Bazilian; Rob Hyman

The Hooters chronology
One Way Home (1987)	Zig Zag (1989)	Out of Body (1993)

Singles from Zig Zag
- 1. "500 Miles" Released: November 1989; 2. "Brother, Don't You Walk Away" Released: January 1990; 3. "Heaven Laughs" Released: 1990; 4. "Don't Knock It 'Til You Try It" Released: 1990; 5. "Give the Music Back" Released: 1990

Professional ratings
Review scores
Source	Rating
AllMusic	3/5 stars

Zig Zag is the fourth studio album by the American rock band the Hooters. It was released on October 26, 1989 by Columbia Records.

== Background ==
With Zig Zag, the Hooters moved toward a more political and folk music direction, contrasting significantly with their previous light-hearted songs. On this album, the songs dealt with the death of a friend, the demise of vinyl records and intrusion of technology, homelessness, a tribute to their own friendship, and even Beijing's Tiananmen Square protests of 1989.

One of the songs, "500 Miles", featuring folk music trio Peter, Paul and Mary on background vocals, dated back to the American Civil War when it was called "Ruben's Train". Additional lyrics were written for the song by keyboard player Rob Hyman, guitarist Eric Bazilian and the album's producer, Rick Chertoff. These lyrics included a reference to Tank Man, or the Unknown Rebel, an anonymous man who became internationally famous when he was videotaped and photographed standing in front of Chinese military tanks and preventing their advance during the Tiananmen Square protests on June 5, 1989.

"Give the Music Back" dealt with the demise of Record Plant Studios, a famous recording studio in New York City, where the Hooters would be among the last musicians to record there before it closed down in 1988.

Zig Zag was the third and final album the Hooters released on Columbia Records.

== Track listing ==
All tracks are written by Rob Hyman and Eric Bazilian, except where noted.

No.	Title	Writer(s)	Length
1.	"Brother, Don't You Walk Away"	Hyman; Bazilian; Rick Chertoff	4:28
2.	"Deliver Me"		4:06
3.	"500 Miles"	Hedy West; additional lyrics by Hyman, Bazilian, Chertoff	4:25
4.	"You Never Know Who Your Friends Are"	Hyman; Bazilian; Chertoff	4:04
5.	"Heaven Laughs"	Hyman; Bazilian; Chertoff	4:19
6.	"Don't Knock It 'Til You Try It"		4:17
7.	"Give the Music Back"		5:15
8.	"Always a Place"		4:03
9.	"Mr. Big Baboon"	Hyman; Bazilian; Chertoff	3:54
10.	"Beat Up Guitar"		4:09

== Personnel ==
Adapted from the album liner notes.

=== The Hooters ===
- Eric Bazilian – lead vocals, lead and rhythm guitars, stringed and wind instruments
- Rob Hyman – lead vocals, acoustic and electric keyboards
- John Lilley – guitar
- Fran Smith Jr. – bass guitar, background vocals
- David Uosikkinen – drums

=== Additional musicians ===
- Peter, Paul and Mary – background vocals (track 3)
- Joel Dubay – background vocals (track 6)
- Todd Haug – background vocals (track 6)
- Rick Chertoff – trumpet (track 6)

=== Technical ===
- Rick Chertoff – production
- Eric Bazilian – co-production
- Rob Hyman – co-production
- John Agnello – engineering
- Phil Nicolo – engineering
- Teddy Trewhella – engineering assistance
- Steve Churchyard – mixing (at Record Plant, NYC)
- George Marino – mastering (at Sterling Sound, NYC)
- Janet Perr – art direction, design
- Robert Diadul – photography

== Charts ==
=== Weekly charts ===
Chart (1990)	Peak position
Japanese Albums (Oricon)	73
Norwegian Albums (VG-lista)	12
Swedish Albums (Sverigetopplistan)	13
US Billboard 200	115
