= Mi amor =

Mi amor or Mio amore (meaning "my love" respectively in Spanish and Italian) may refer to:

== EPs ==
- Mi Amor (Jin Akanishi EP), 2014
- Mi amor (Miriam Bryant EP), 2019

== Songs ==
- "Mi amor" (Souf song), 2016
- "Mi amore", song by Angie Martinez on Up Close and Personal, 2001
- "Mi amore", song by Velvet, 2006
- "Mi amore", song by Jessy Matador, 2017
- ”Mi Amor”, song by Nova Miller, 2020

== See also ==
- Amor (disambiguation)
- Amore (disambiguation)
- "I Adore Mi Amor", R&B single by group Color Me Badd, 1991
- Mi Amore Cadenza, character in My Little Pony: Friendship Is Magic
