= Amore (The Hooters album) =

Studio album by the Hooters
- Released: December 1983
- Recorded: 1983
- Studio: Studio 4 Recording, Philadelphia
- Genre: Rock
- Length: 25:04
- Label: Antenna
- Producer: Eric Bazilian; Rob Hyman

The Hooters chronology
Amore (1983)	Nervous Night (1985)

Singles from Amore
- 1. "Hanging on a Heartbeat" Released: 1984

Professional ratings
Review scores
Source	Rating
AllMusic	2/5 stars
MusicHound Rock: The Essential Album Guide	2.5/5 stars

Amore is the debut studio album by American rock band the Hooters, released in 1983.

== Background ==
The Hooters got their start with their independently released album Amore. It cost $12,000 to record. The album sold over 100,000 copies, mostly in the Philadelphia area, and led to their major label record deal with Columbia Records in 1984.

Amore introduced early versions of four songs: "All You Zombies," "Hanging on a Heartbeat," "Fightin' on the Same Side," and "Blood from a Stone," which would reappear in different versions on later albums.

An even earlier studio recording of "Fightin' on the Same Side" and a live recording of "All You Zombies" had previously been released as singles in 1981 and 1982, respectively, on the small indie label Eighty Percent Records.

In 2001, 18 years after its original release on LP album and cassette, Amore was made available on compact disc and included two cover versions as bonus tracks: the Beatles' "Lucy in the Sky with Diamonds" from June 15, 1986, at A Conspiracy of Hope, a benefit concert on behalf of Amnesty International at Giants Stadium in East Rutherford, New Jersey, and the Skatalites' "Man in the Street," a live demo from the first Hooters recording session in 1980, which was also the band's first song to be played on the radio.

== Critical reception ==
Trouser Press wrote: "The Hooters’ easy facility in many stylistic genres (reggae, the main impulse on Amore, remains in the repertoire, along with glossed-up heartland rock versed in folk traditionalism) matches an inability to pin down any clear-cut personality."

== Track listing ==
All tracks are written by Rob Hyman and Eric Bazilian, except where noted.

1. "Amore" - 3:31
2. "Blood from a Stone" - 3:19
3. "Hanging on a Heartbeat" (Hyman, Bazilian, Glenn Goss, Jeff Ziv) - 3:01
4. "All You Zombies" - 3:47
5. "Birdman" - 3:17
6. "Don't Wanna Fight" - 2:50
7. "Fightin' on the Same Side" - 2:53
8. "Concubine" - 2:22

2001 CD bonus tracks

9. "Lucy in the Sky with Diamonds" (live, 1986) (John Lennon, Paul McCartney) - 3:59
10. "Man in the Street" (demo, 1980) (Don Drummond) - 3:58

== Personnel ==
Credits adapted from the album liner notes.

The Hooters

- Eric Bazilian – lead vocals (1, 2, 3, 6), guitar, saxophone
- John Lilley – guitar
- Rob Hyman – lead vocals (2, 4, 5, 7, 8), keyboards
- Rob Miller – bass, vocals
- David Uosikkinen – drums

Technical

- Eric Bazilian – producer
- Rob Hyman – producer
- Phil Nicolo – engineer
- Bob Ludwig – mastering
- Barbara Blair – art direction, design
- Mark Chin – photography
- Stephen Spera – cover art
- Charles Grumbling – graphics
- Tomas Sokol – label design, inner sleeve
