= Nervous Night (album) =

Studio album by the Hooters
- Released: 6 May 1985
- Recorded: 1984–1985
- Studios: Record Plant Studios, NYC; Studio 4, Philadelphia
- Genre: Rock
- Length: 39:02 (LP); 43:07 (CD and cassette)
- Labels: Columbia; CBS (Europe)
- Producer: Rick Chertoff

The Hooters chronology
| Amore (1983) | Nervous Night (1985) | One Way Home (1987) |

Singles from Nervous Night
- 1. "All You Zombies" Released: March 1985; 2. "And We Danced" Released: August 1985; 3. "Day by Day" Released: December 1985; 4. "Where Do the Children Go" Released: March 1986

Professional ratings
Review scores
| Source | Rating |
|---|---|
| AllMusic | 4.5/5 stars |
| Robert Christgau | C+ |
| Rolling Stone | (positive) |

Nervous Night is the second studio album by American rock band the Hooters, released on 6 May 1985 by Columbia Records and on CBS Records in Europe. The album features two of the band's biggest and best-known hits, "And We Danced" and "Day by Day". It also includes the minor hit "All You Zombies", which was a rerecorded version of a single that had first been released in 1982.

== Background ==
Different versions of three songs on Nervous Night — "All You Zombies," "Hanging on a Heartbeat," and "Blood from a Stone" — were originally released on The Hooters' independent album release Amore in 1983. "Blood From a Stone" had also been recently covered by Red Rockers and released as a single.

Eric Bazilian told Songfacts that "Day by Day" "was a song that started as an experiment with Rick Chertoff." He added that it took them "2 years whipping it into shape."

Cash Box said that fourth single "Where Do the Children Go" was a "poignant ballad."

== 1986 film ==
An award-winning film starring The Hooters and directed by John Jopson, Nervous Night, was produced by Bell One Productions. Nervous Night was shot on 35mm film and intercuts two separate elements: a concert filmed at the Tower Theater outside Philadelphia, and a series of short films, each one starring a different band member.

The VHS release by CBS/Fox Video did not contain the short films; however, portions of the shorts were included in the "Day By Day" music video. MTV aired the version with the short films in the summer of 1986 as part of their Feature Presentation series.

== Critical reception ==
Upon the release of Nervous Nights, Billboard called the band an "upbeat, bright- sounding quintet" that would likely receive "strong radio support" from the album. Cashbox wrote that the album had "just the right combination of power pop melodic rock and moody British textures for the current rock radio temperament."

Stereo Review characterized the album as "mainstream rock with occasional quirky touches", specifically citing the incorporation of mandolins and a melodica as a demonstration of this. They singled out their cover of "She Comes in Colors" as "surprisingly effective" and felt that most of the material and believed that they had "all the stylistic bases covered. They were more critical of the songwriting and the content of the original material, saying that the album "sounds as if the Hooters learned to write at Corporate Rock Extension School".

== Awards ==
On September 5, 1986, The Hooters appeared on the 1986 MTV Video Music Awards, where they were nominated in the category of Best New Artist in a Video for "And We Danced." They performed two songs on the show, "And We Danced" and "Nervous Night."

At Billboard's 8th Annual Video Music Conference on November 22, 1986, the film Nervous Night won two awards: Best Concert Performance for the "Where Do the Children Go" video and Best Long-Form Program.

On October 7, 1994, Nervous Night achieved a 2x platinum certification in the United States for shipments in excess of 2 million copies in the United States.

== Track listing ==
All tracks are written by Rob Hyman and Eric Bazilian, except where noted.

| No. | Title | Writer(s) | Length |
|---|---|---|---|
| 1. | "And We Danced" | | 3:48 |
| 2. | "Day by Day" | Hyman; Bazilian; Rick Chertoff | 3:24 |
| 3. | "All You Zombies" | | 5:58 |
| 4. | "Don't Take My Car Out Tonight" | Hyman; Bazilian; Chertoff | 3:55 |
| 5. | "Nervous Night" (CD and cassette bonus track) | Hyman; Bazilian; Chertoff | 3:58 |
| 6. | "Hanging on a Heartbeat" | Hyman; Bazilian; Glenn Goss; Jeff Ziv | 4:20 |
| 7. | "Where Do the Children Go" | | 5:29 |
| 8. | "South Ferry Road" | Hyman; Bazilian; Chertoff | 3:43 |
| 9. | "She Comes in Colors" | Arthur Lee | 4:12 |
| 10. | "Blood from a Stone" | | 4:13 |

Notes

- The album's title track did not appear on original LP releases of the album, or on the very first CDs. Originally a B-side to the "All You Zombies" single, it was included on all subsequent CD and cassette editions of the album as track 5.

== Personnel ==
Credits adapted from the album liner notes.

The Hooters

- Eric Bazilian – lead vocals (tracks 1–3, 5–7, 9–10), guitars, bass, mandolin, saxophone
- Rob Hyman – lead vocals (tracks 1–4, 6–8), keyboards, melodica
- Andy King – bass, vocals
- John Lilley – guitar
- David Uosikkinen – drums

Additional musicians

- Patty Smyth – vocals on "Where Do the Children Go"

Technical

- Rick Chertoff – producer
- John Agnello – engineer
- William Wittman – engineer, mixing (at Atlantic Studios)
- Carol Cafiero – assistant engineer
- Dan Nash – assistant engineer
- Dave Thoener – mixing ("And We Danced") (at Cherokee Studios)
- George Marino – mastering (at Sterling Sound)
- Joel Zimmerman – art direction, design
- Mark Chin – photography
- Barbara Blair – production design

== Charts ==
| Chart (1985) | Peak position |
|---|---|
| Australia (Kent Music Report) | 12 |
| US Billboard 200 | 12 |

== Certifications ==
| Region | Certification | Certified units/sales |
|---|---|---|
| United States (RIAA) | 2× Platinum | 2,000,000^{^} |
| Australia (ARIA) | Gold | 35,000^{^} |
| New Zealand (RMNZ) | Gold | 7,500^{^} |
^{^} Shipments figures based on certification alone.
