= Amora =

Amora may refer to:

== People ==
- Amora Bettany, Brazilian video game artist
- Amora Mautner (born 1975), Brazilian television director and former actress
- Daniel Amora (born 1987), Brazilian footballer
- Amoraim (singular: Amora), Jewish scholars in ancient Babylonia and the Land of Israel

== Other uses ==
- Amora (mustard), French manufacturer of Dijon mustard etc.
- Amora (Seixal), a parish and town near Lisbon, Portugal
  - Amora F.C., a Portuguese football club
- Amora, a trademarked name for moissanite, a silicon carbide mineral
- Amora, a sorceress known as the Enchantress (Marvel Comics)
- Amora London, a European touring exhibition dedicated to love, relationships and sexual wellbeing

== See also ==
- Amor (disambiguation)
- Amore (disambiguation)
