= Johnny B =

Johnny B may refer to:

- "Johnny B" (song), song by The Hooters
- Jonathon Brandmeier (born 1956), American radio personality and musician known as Johnny B

== See also ==
- Johnny Be Good, 1988 American comedy film directed by Bud Smith
- "Johnny B. Goode", 1958 rock-and-roll song written and first recorded by Chuck Berry and covered intensively
