= Amor Amor =

Amor Amor may refer to:

== Film and TV ==
- Amor Amor (film), 2018 Portuguese film with Ana Moreira and Margarida Vila-Nova
- Amor Amor (TV series), 2021 Portuguese telenovela

== Music ==
=== Albums ===
- Amor Amor, album by Lolita Flores 1975
- Amor Amor, album by Conjunto Primavera Latin Grammy award Best Norteño Album
- Amor Amor (José José album) 1980
- Amor Amor, album by Arielle Dombasle 2004
- Amor Amor, album by Fernando Echavarría and La Familia André
- Amor Amor, album by Janis Nikos

=== Songs ===
- "Amor Amor" (Gabriel Ruiz song), also known as "Amor, Amor, Amor"
- "Amor Amor", hit song by Lolita Flores 1975
- "Amor Amor" (José José song), single, written Rafael Pérez Botija 1980
- "Amor Amor", song by Luis Alberto del Parana And His Trio Los Paraguayos 1962
- "Amor Amor" (Roselyn Sánchez song), single nominated for a Latin Grammy from Borinqueña (album)
- "Amor Amor (Amour c'est toute dire)", song by Dalida from Femme est la nuit, also from À ma manière... Coup de chapeau au passé
- "Amor Amor", song from Walkin' My Baby Back Home (Jo Stafford album)
- "Amor Amor", hit song from W (Wanessa album)

== See also ==
- Amor (disambiguation)
