= Satellite (The Hooters song) =

Single by The Hooters

from the album One Way Home
- B-side: "One Way Home"
- Released: 1987
- Genre: Pop rock
- Length: 3:50 (single version); 4:18 (album version)
- Label: Columbia (US); CBS
- Songwriters: Rob Hyman; Eric Bazilian; Rick Chertoff
- Producer: Rick Chertoff

The Hooters singles chronology
"Johnny B" (1987)	"Satellite" (1987)	"Karla with a K" (1987)

Music video
- "Satellite" on YouTube

"Satellite" is a song by American rock band the Hooters, which was released in 1987 as the second single from their third studio album One Way Home. The song was written by Rob Hyman, Eric Bazilian and Rick Chertoff, and produced by Chertoff. "Satellite" reached No. 61 on the US Billboard Hot 100 and No. 22 on the UK Singles Chart, their only song to chart there.

== Background ==
"Satellite" takes a satirical look at Televangelism. Hyman told Simon Mayo for the Reading Evening Post in 1987: "They're a strange combination of religious concepts and satellite technology both up there in the heavens. It's all very political because to get your programmes on the satellite you need influence, money and power. The programmes are supposed to be non profit making but recent exposés have uncovered loads of financial scandals. Our song is very timely!"

== Music video ==
The song's music video was directed by David Hogan and produced by Daniel Stewart for Limelight Productions. It shows satirical takes and depictions of typical televangelism shows, which a girl watches along with the subjects of the Grant Wood painting American Gothic. The video achieved active rotation on MTV.

== Critical reception ==
Upon its release, Billboard described "Satellite" as a "traditionally styled rock number". Cash Box considered the song a "driving pop/rock" track that "should continue" the band's success in the Top 40 and on AOR radio. Music & Media wrote, "Captivating and epic piece of rock with folk overtones through an accordion and a Big Country type of lick." Chris Welch of Kerrang! described it as being in "Byrds-Dylan territory, updated, revitalised, very strong and melodic". In a review of One Way Home, David Fricke of Rolling Stone described the song as a "powerful pop KO of TV pulpit pounders", with its "core riff" being "a metallic jig figure – sort of Boston meets John Barleycorn – fattened up with iron-fist guitar chords and Close Encounters synth effects".

== Track listing ==
7" single

1. "Satellite" - 3:50
2. "One Way Home" - 5:33

7" single (US promo)

1. "Satellite" (LV) - 4:18
2. "Satellite" (SV) - 3:50

12" and CD single

1. "Satellite" - 4:18
2. "One Way Home" - 5:33
3. "All You Zombies" - 5:58

== Personnel ==
The Hooters

- Eric Bazilian - lead vocals, lead guitar
- Rob Hyman - keyboards, accordion, melodica
- Andy King - bass guitar, backing vocals
- John Lilley - rhythm guitar
- David Uosikkinen - drums

Production

- Rick Chertoff - producer
- Rob Hyman, Eric Bazilian - co-producers
- Dave Thoener, Rod O'Brien, Phil Nicolo - engineers
- Teddy Trewhella, Frank Pekoc, Joe Henehan - assistant engineers
- George Marino - mastering

== Charts ==
Chart (1987–88)	Peak position
Belgium (Ultratop 50 Flanders)	35
Netherlands (Dutch Top 40)	19
Netherlands (Single Top 100)	20
European Hot 100 Singles	20
Ireland (IRMA)	17
UK Singles (OCC)	22
US Billboard Hot 100	61
US Billboard Album Rock Tracks	13
US Cash Box Top 100 Singles	67
West Germany (GfK)	34
