= Johnny B (song) =

Single by The Hooters

from the album One Way Home
- B-side: "Lucy in the Sky with Diamonds (Live)"
- Released: 1987
- Genre: Celtic rock, hard rock
- Length: 3:58
- Label: Columbia
- Songwriters: Eric Bazilian, Rick Chertoff, Rob Hyman
- Producer: Rick Chertoff

The Hooters singles chronology
"Where Do the Children Go" (1986)	"Johnny B" (1987)	"Satellite" (1987)

Music video
- "Johnny B" on YouTube

"Johnny B" is a song from the Hooters' third studio album One Way Home. It was written by Eric Bazilian, Rick Chertoff and Rob Hyman. "Johnny B" was released as a single in 1987 by Columbia Records, and reached No. 61 on Billboard Hot 100 list. The song had considerable success in Germany, topping at No. 7 for two weeks. An accompanying music video was also released, directed by David Fincher and produced by Propaganda Films.

Cash Box said that it "is filled with musical textures that enhance the narrative and range from Old World quaintness to gritty guitar-based rock."

== Personnel ==
- Rob Hyman – lead vocals, keyboards
- Eric Bazilian – recorder, mandolin, lead guitar, bass guitar, harmonica, harmony vocals
- John Lilley – rhythm guitar
- David Uosikkinen – drums

== Track list ==
7" and 12" single
A side: "Johnny B" (3:58)
B side: "Lucy in the Sky with Diamonds (Live)" (4:08)

CD Maxi single (released in Germany by CBS)

1. "Johnny B" (3:58)
2. "Lucy in the Sky with Diamonds (Live)" (4:08)
3. "Satellite" (4:08)
4. "And We Danced" (3:48)

== Charts ==
Chart (1987)	Peak position
Australian (Kent Music Report)	74
US Billboard Hot 100	61
US Top Rock Tracks (Billboard)	3
West Germany (GFK)	7

== Covers ==
The song was covered in 1997 by the German rap group Down Low and reached No. 4 on the German Singles Chart. The Finnish rock band Yö has also recorded a Finnish version of the song with the title "Angelique". Czech rock band Tlustá Berta also recorded another version of this song titled "Prázdnej byt" and Nanovor titled "Už nezavolá".

Another cover was released in August 2019 by German folk metal band Equilibrium, on their album Renegades.
