= The Hooters =

American rock band

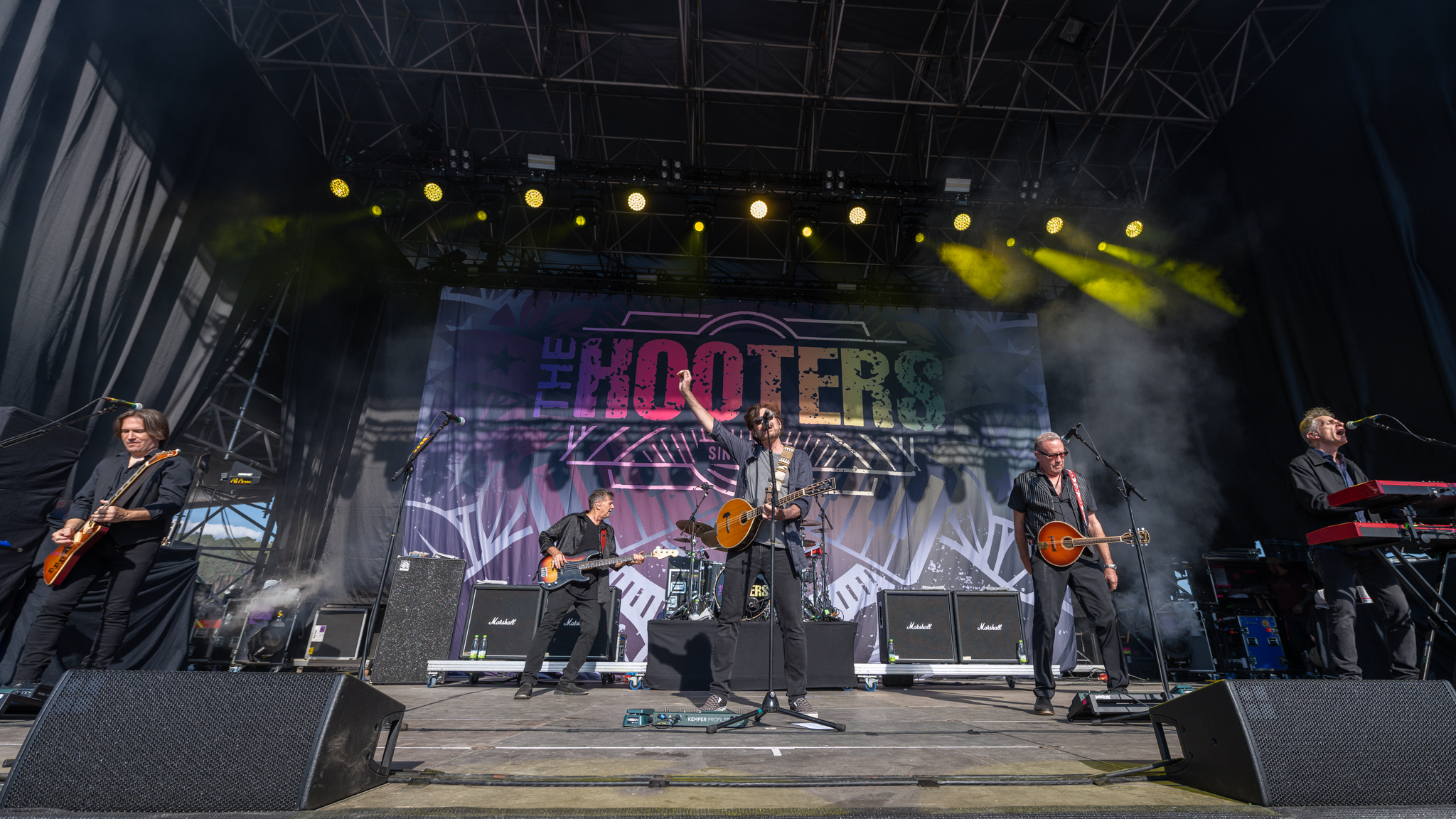
- The Hooters performing in 2022

Background information
- Origin: Philadelphia, Pennsylvania, U.S.
- Genres: Rock; new wave; roots rock; Celtic rock
- Years active: 1980–present
- Labels: Columbia; MCA; Megaforce
- Members: Eric Bazilian; Rob Hyman; David Uosikkinen; John Lilley; Fran Smith Jr.; Tommy Williams
- Past members: Bob King; Bobby Woods; John Kuzma; Rob Miller; Andy King; Mindy Jostyn
- Website: hootersmusic.com

The Hooters are an American rock band, which was founded in Philadelphia in 1980. They combine elements of rock, reggae, ska, and folk music.

The Hooters first gained major commercial success in the United States in the mid-1980s due to heavy radio airplay and MTV rotation of several songs, including "All You Zombies", "Day by Day", "And We Danced", and "Where Do the Children Go". In 1985, the band played at the Live Aid benefit concert in Philadelphia. In Europe, the Hooters had success with the singles "All You Zombies" and "Johnny B", and the band's breakthrough across Europe came with the single "Satellite". In 1990, the band played at The Wall Concert in Berlin.

The Hooters have staged successful tours in Europe. In 2007, the band released its first album of new material since 1993, Time Stand Still. The band's most recent album, Rocking & Swing, was released in 2023.

== Career ==
=== Early years (1980–1984) ===
Rob Hyman and Eric Bazilian met in 1971 at the University of Pennsylvania. In the late 1970s, they played in a Philadelphia-based band called Baby Grand, which featured local singer David Kagan. Baby Grand released two albums on Arista Records.

In 1980, the Hooters were formed by Hyman and Bazilian. The band played their first show on July 4 that year. They took their name from a nickname for the melodica, a type of keyboard harmonica.

During the early 1980s, the Hooters played on Philadelphia's club scene, boosted by airplay on WMMR, a major rock radio station in Philadelphia. Their music was also played frequently on WRDV-FM in Bucks County, Pennsylvania. They soon became a huge success along their native United States, playing everything from clubs to high schools, while appearing on local television shows. The original versions of "Man in the Street", "Fightin' on the Same Side", "Rescue Me", and "All You Zombies" were released as singles in the 1980s.

On September 25, 1982, the Hooters opened for one of the Who's farewell tour concert shows at JFK Stadium in Philadelphia on a bill that also included The Clash and Santana.

In 1983, John Kuzma (guitar) and Bobby Woods (bass) left the band. They were replaced by John Lilley (guitar, backing vocals) and Rob Miller (bass, backing vocals), two former members of another popular local group, Robert Hazard and the Heroes.

Later in 1983, the Hooters began working on their first album. The result, Amore, was released on the independent label Antenna and sold over 100,000 copies. Amore included "All You Zombies", "Hanging on a Heartbeat", "Fightin' On The Same Side", and "Blood From A Stone", all of which would reappear in different versions on later albums. Although a studio album, Amore captured the same energy and spirit that made the Hooters admired for their live performances.

The same year, Bazilian and Hyman were asked to write, arrange, and perform on the debut album of a relatively unknown singer named Cyndi Lauper, She's So Unusual, which was being produced by their former producer and friend, Rick Chertoff. Hyman co-wrote the song "Time After Time" (and also sang the lower harmony vocal in the choruses), which went to hit Number 1 on the Billboard Hot 100 Singles Chart and was subsequently nominated for a Grammy Award for Song of the Year.

On July 26, 1984, at the Four Seasons Hotel in Philadelphia, Columbia Records signed Rob Hyman and Eric Bazilian as "The Hooters".

In 1984, WMMR, a nationally renowned Philadelphia rock music station, sponsored a school spirit contest where local high school students were asked to send in the postcard to the station. The school with the most postcards would win a free concert by the band. The radio station received over 26 million postcards. Shawnee High in Medford, NJ was declared the winner having sent in three million cards.

Just before the band were about to experience mainstream success, bassist Rob Miller was seriously injured in an automobile accident and was replaced by Andy King.

=== Mainstream success (1985–1989) ===
The Hooters' debut album, Nervous Night, released in 1985 on Columbia Records, achieved 2× platinum status in the United States, selling in excess of two million copies and included Billboard Top 40 hits "Day by Day" (No. 18), "And We Danced" (No. 21) and "Where Do the Children Go" (No. 38), the latter which featured accompanying vocals from Patty Smyth and was inspired by a news report about a series of suicides in Pennsylvania. Rolling Stone named the Hooters "Best New Band of the Year".

On July 13, 1985, the Hooters were the opening band at the Philadelphia Live Aid benefit concert, gaining international recognition for the first time. Bob Geldof said that he did not see the Hooters as a high-profile band suitable for Live Aid but that the band was forced on him by Bill Graham, promoter of Live Aid in the U.S. Geldof let his feelings be known during an interview for Rolling Stone saying: "Who the fuck are the Hooters?" The Hooters' performance at Live Aid, however, does not appear on the officially released DVD of the concert. Their first major overseas tour came later that year when they played throughout Australia.

On May 18, 1986, the Hooters participated in America Rocks, the concert portion of the 1986 Kodak Liberty Ride Festival that celebrated the restoration of the Statue of Liberty and Ellis Island, at the Louisiana Superdome in New Orleans. The three-hour concert was broadcast via satellite to 100 cities and also featured the Neville Brothers, Huey Lewis and the News, and Daryl Hall & John Oates.

On June 15, 1986, the Hooters participated in A Conspiracy of Hope, a benefit concert on behalf of Amnesty International, at Giants Stadium in East Rutherford, New Jersey. On September 5, 1986, the Hooters appeared on the 1986 MTV Video Music Awards, where they were nominated in the category of Best New Artist for "And We Danced". They performed two songs on the show, "And We Danced" and "Nervous Night".

At Billboard's 8th Annual Video Music Conference on November 22, 1986, the Hooters won two awards: Best Concert Performance for the "Where Do the Children Go" video and Best Longform Program for the full length Nervous Night home video. They also placed in five categories in Billboard's Top 100 of 1986: Top Pop Artist, No. 41; Top Pop Album, No. 23; Top Pop Album Artists/Groups, No. 16; Top Pop Album Artists based on one album, No. 27; and Top Pop Singles Artists based on three singles, No. 3.

In 1987, the Hooters experienced their first major commercial success in Europe. After heavy airplay in the United Kingdom, "Satellite", from the album One Way Home, became a hit single, reaching No. 22 in the UK Singles Chart. The band performed on the popular British television show Top of the Pops on December 3, where they met one of their musical idols, Paul McCartney. The song proved controversial, however, for its satire of the excesses of televangelism. "Satellite" was also featured in an episode of Miami Vice, titled "Amen...Send Money", which first aired on October 2, 1987, dealing with two warring televangelists. The accompanying video went even further, depicting a young girl and her parents, who resemble the couple from Grant Wood's American Gothic painting, attempting to watch The Three Stooges interspersed with the Hooters performing, but being constantly interrupted by transmissions from a Christian show. Although never officially confirmed, the video contained barely concealed parodies of famous Christian televangelists Tammy Faye Bakker, Jerry Falwell, and Oral Roberts. On the tour supporting One Way Home, Fran Smith Jr. (bass, backing vocals) was brought in to replace Andy King, who left the band to pursue other interests.

On November 24, 1987, Thanksgiving night, the Hooters headlined the Spectrum in Philadelphia for the first time. The show was broadcast live on MTV and the Westwood One radio network simultaneously, the second time, after Asia on December 6, 1983, that the two networks joined forces in producing a concert for one artist.

In 1989, the Hooters issued their final album for Columbia Records, Zig Zag, which was introduced as politically oriented theme, with Peter, Paul and Mary providing background vocals for an updated version of the 1960s folk song "500 Miles", which became an international hit.

=== International success (1990–1995) ===
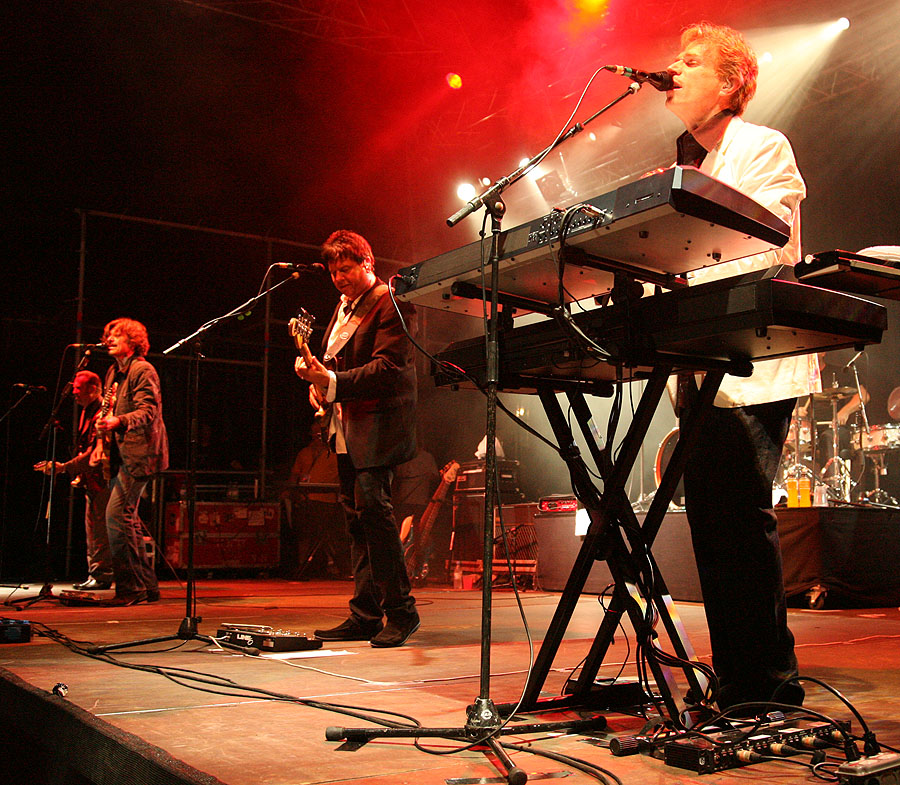
The Hooters performing in Hamm, Germany, in 2007

In the 1990s, the Hooters' success in the United States began to wane, while their popularity overseas, especially in Europe, reached new heights. Following a show at The Town & Country Club in London in March 1988, the band met Roger Waters of Pink Floyd, who told them that he was a fan. This eventually led to their appearance in Waters' staging of The Wall Concert at Potsdamer Platz in Berlin, on July 21, 1990.

Violinist, guitarist, and multi-instrumentalist Mindy Jostyn, formerly with Joe Jackson, Billy Joel and others, joined the group for a short period during 1992–1993, adding a new voice to the mix.

In 1993, the band released their debut album for MCA Records, Out of Body. While not a commercial success in the U.S., the album found a large audience in Europe, especially in Sweden and Germany, where "Boys Will Be Boys", a song featuring Cyndi Lauper, became a huge hit.

The Hooters Live, recorded over two nights in Germany in December 1993, was released in Europe and Asia in 1994, but was never released in the United States. In 1995 the band went on hiatus.

=== Reunited (2001–present) ===
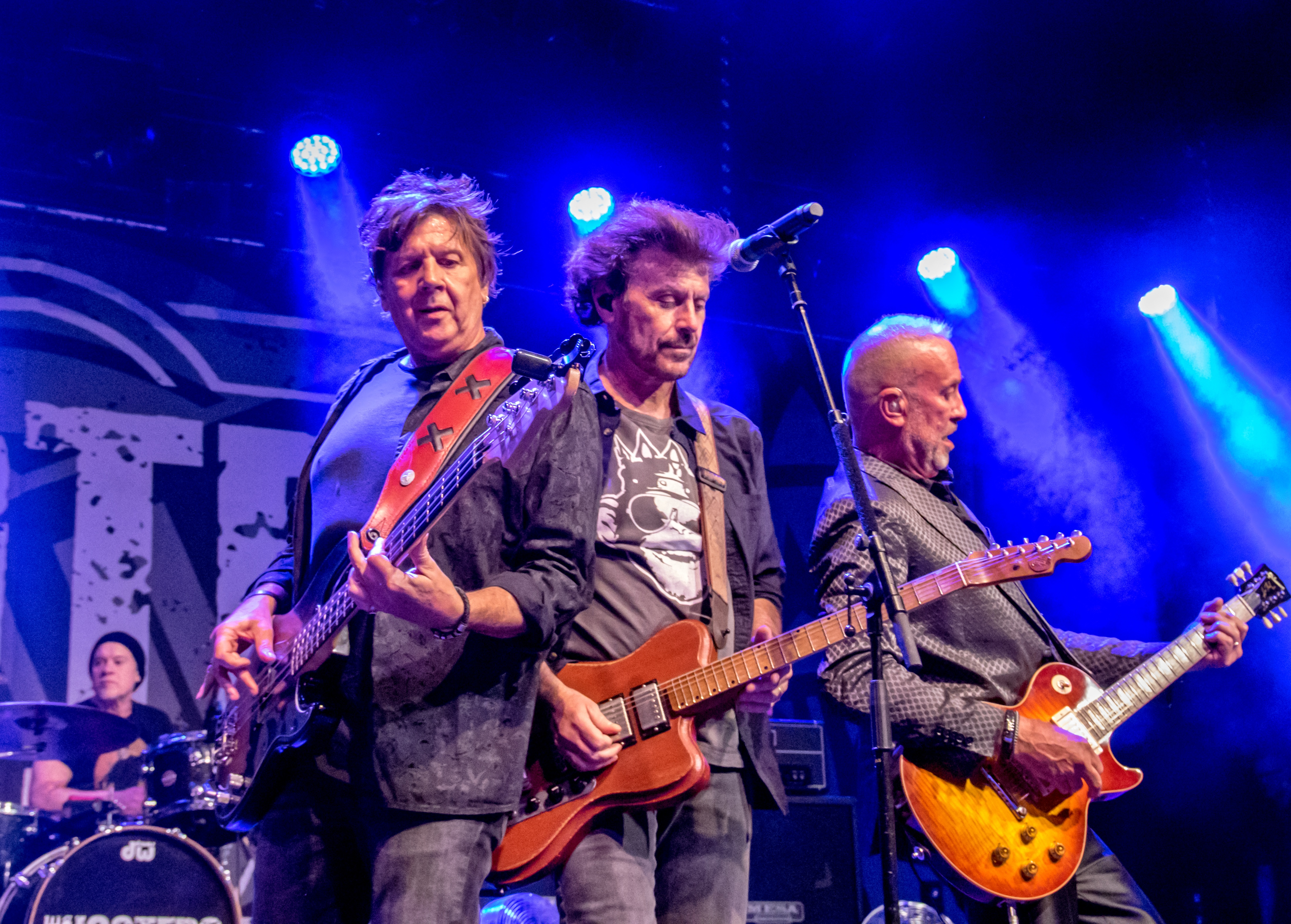
The Hooters at the Zelt-Musik-Festival in Freiburg, Germany, in 2018

On November 21, 2001, the Hooters performed a one-off show at the Spectrum in Philadelphia to celebrate disc jockey Pierre Robert's 20th anniversary at local rock radio station WMMR, the first major station to play the music of the Hooters in the early 1980s.

In 2003, the Hooters reunited in Germany, where they performed a successful 17-city tour. The success of the tour prompted two further tours in 2004 and 2005, where they premiered new unreleased songs and played in Switzerland and Sweden.

On May 11, 2004, the Hooters were presented with a Lifetime Achievement Award from the Philadelphia Music Awards.

In November 2005, the Hooters appeared on VH1 Classic's concert series Decades Live Rock as guests of Cyndi Lauper, where they performed "And We Danced" and "All You Zombies".

In June 2006, the band played their first shows in the United States in over a decade, performing three shows, including a homecoming show at Electric Factory in Philadelphia on June 16, a show at the Borgata in Atlantic City, New Jersey, on June 17, and an outdoor show at Hubbard Park in Rob Hyman's hometown of Meriden, Connecticut, on June 18.

Following these three shows, the Hooters entered Hyman's Elmstreet Studios to record their first album of new material since 1993. In September 2007, Time Stand Still was released, preceded by a tour of Europe from June through August, with shows in Germany, Sweden, the Netherlands, and Switzerland.

In November 2007, the Hooters returned to Europe for a short tour of Switzerland and Germany, including a show filmed for television in Basel, Switzerland, as part the AVO Concerts Series. They played two shows at the Electric Factory in Philadelphia, during Thanksgiving week on Wednesday, November 21 and Friday, November 23, with the November 23 show broadcast by radio station WXPN in 85 markets.

On February 28 and March 1, 2008, the Hooters again entered Elmstreet Studios to begin work on a new album. Accompanied by Ann Marie Calhoun on violin, the band recorded acoustic rearrangements of 12 of their previously released songs, which resulted in a double-disc set, along with the band's concerts the previous year at the Electric Factory. The album, Both Sides Live, was released in November 2008.

In March 2008, the Hooters played two shows in support of Time Stand Still, which was released in the U.S. in February 2008. It included shows at B.B. King's Blues Club and Grill in New York City on March 6 and The Birchmere in Alexandria, Virginia, on March 29. In July 2008, the Hooters launched a European summer tour, playing shows in Norway, Sweden, Germany, and Switzerland. On October 23, 2009, in one of their last concerts at the Wachovia Spectrum in Philadelphia, the Hooters, Todd Rundgren, and Daryl Hall & John Oates headlined a concert called Last Call.

In 2012 the Hooters fired their manager, Steve Mountain.

In 2017, the Hooters released Give the Music Back: Live Double Album, and toured in Europe and played shows in the Philadelphia area.

In May 2023, the Hooters released Rocking & Swing, an album supported by a tour of the United States with Rick Springfield, their first full U.S. tour in over a decade.

In December 2025, the Hooters released 45 Alive, a concert album recorded at the Keswick Theater.

== Band members ==
The Hooters performing in 2022

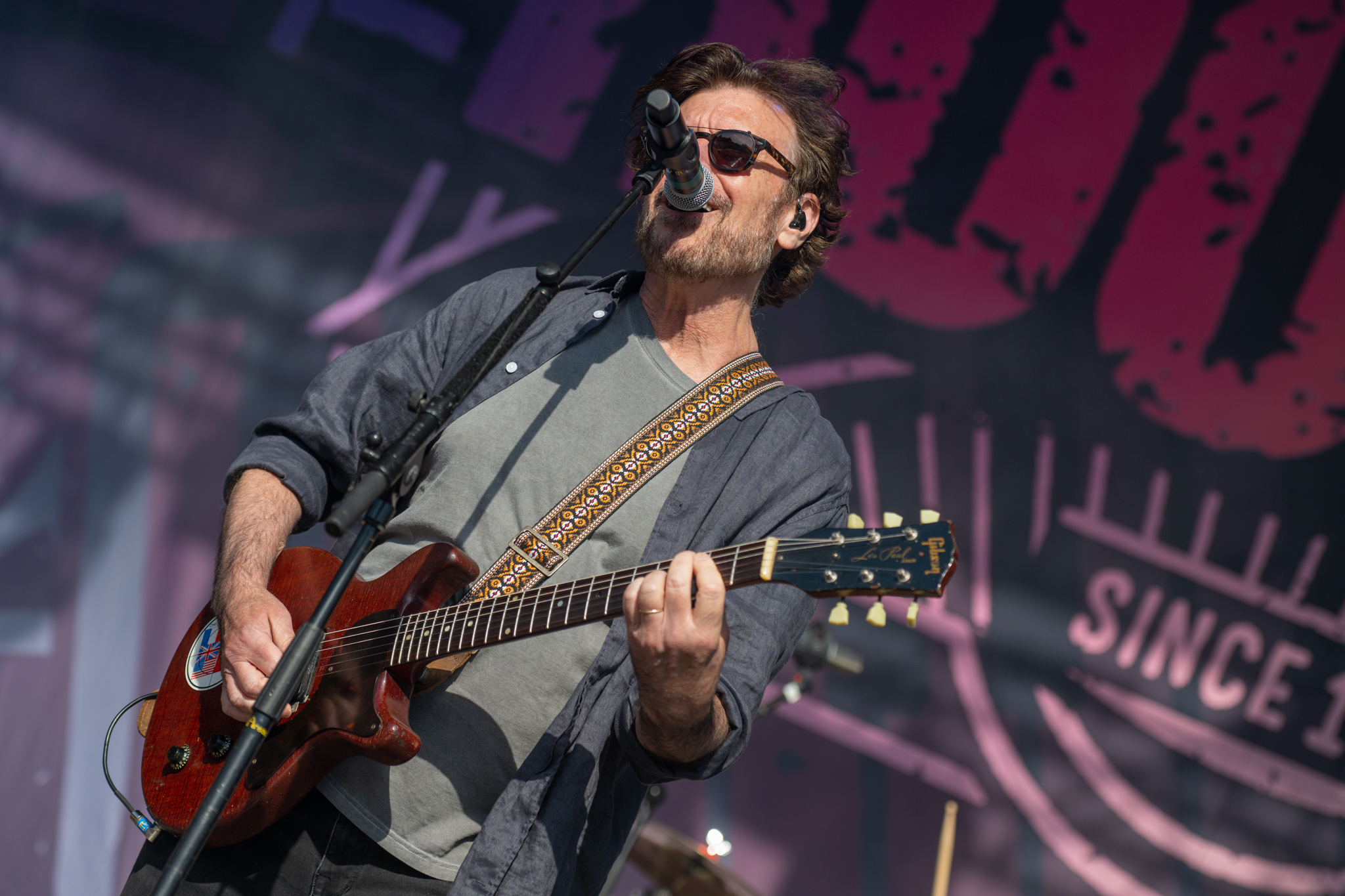
Eric Bazilian

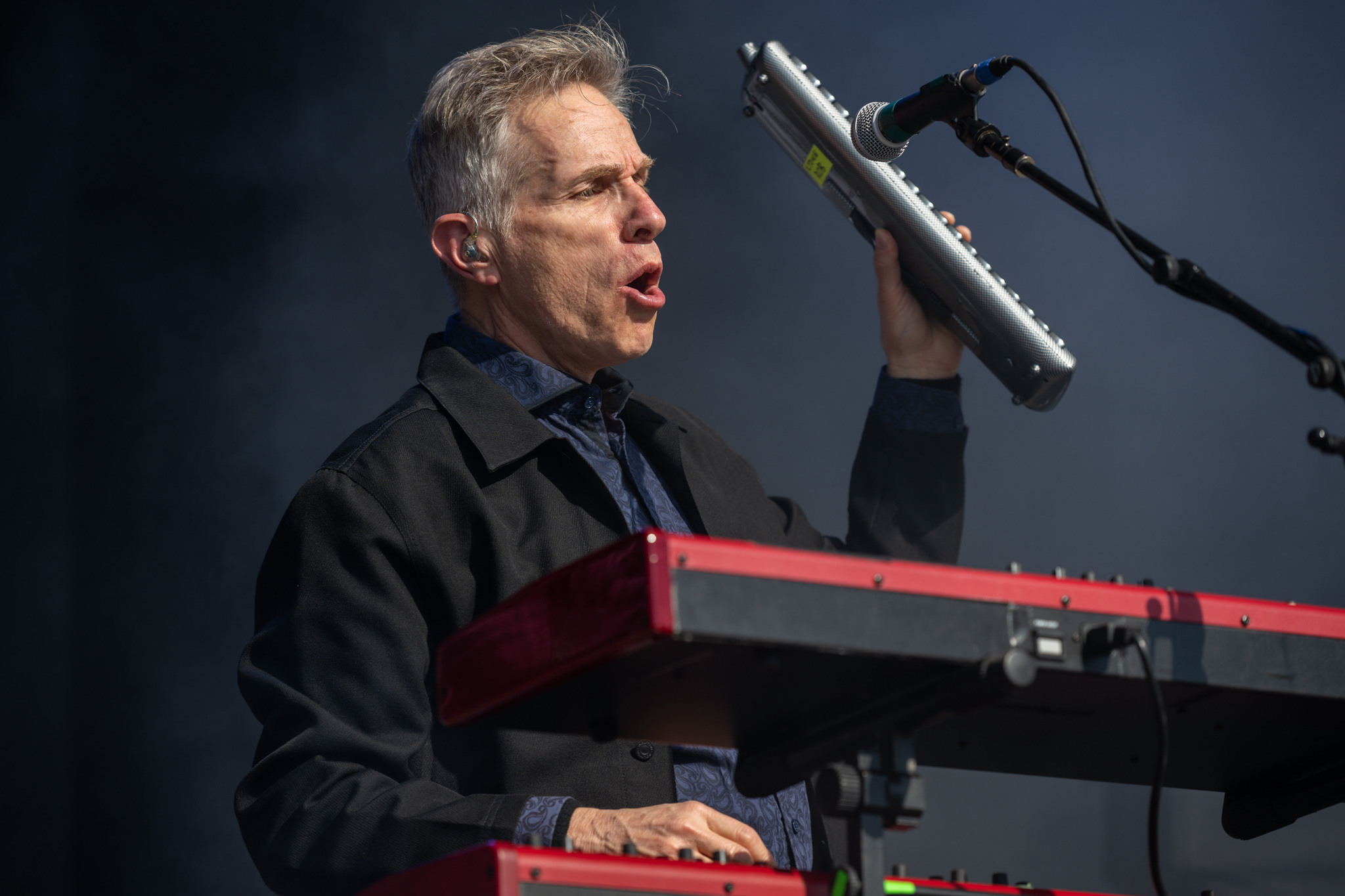
Rob Hyman

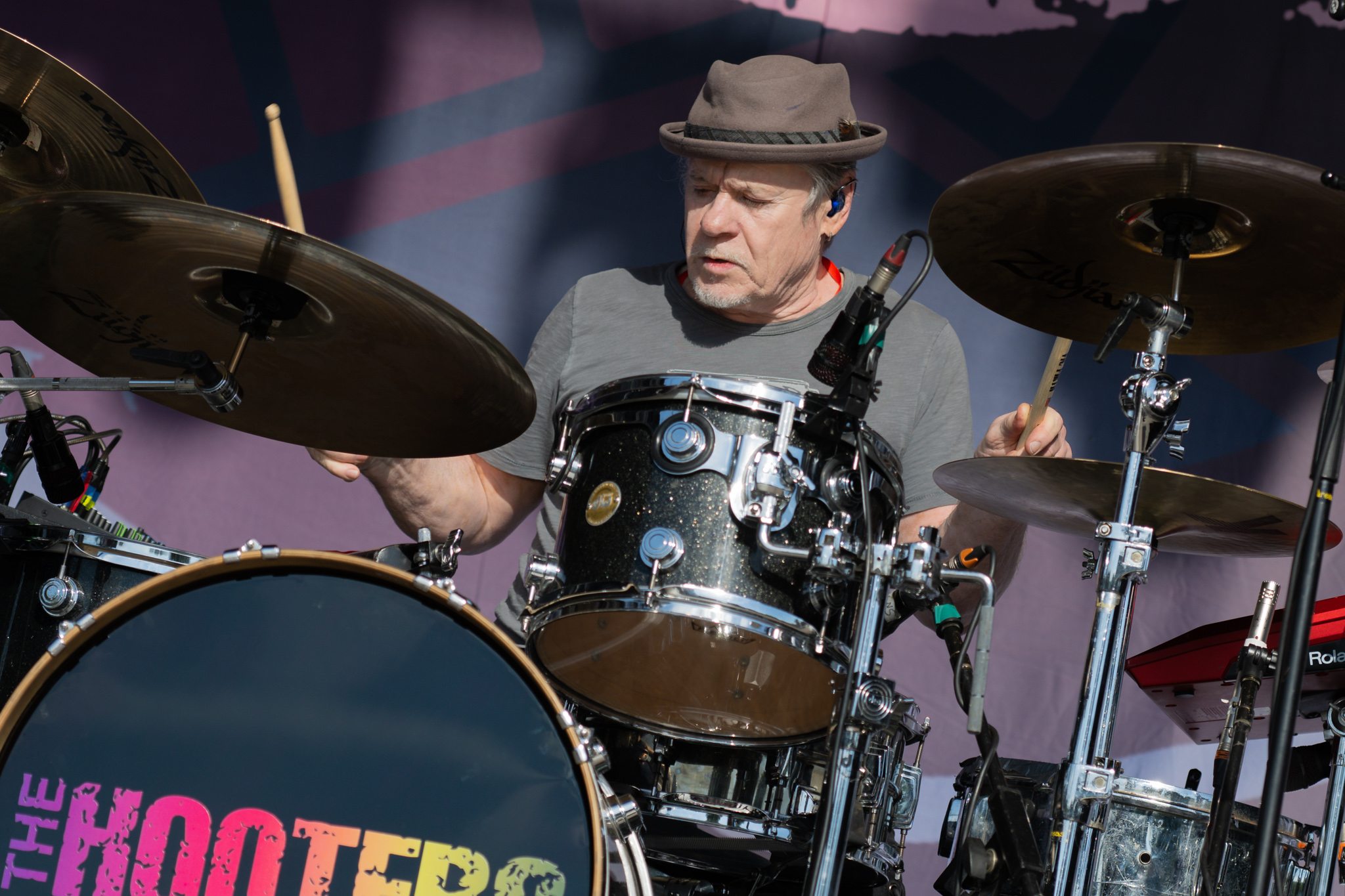
David Uosikkinen

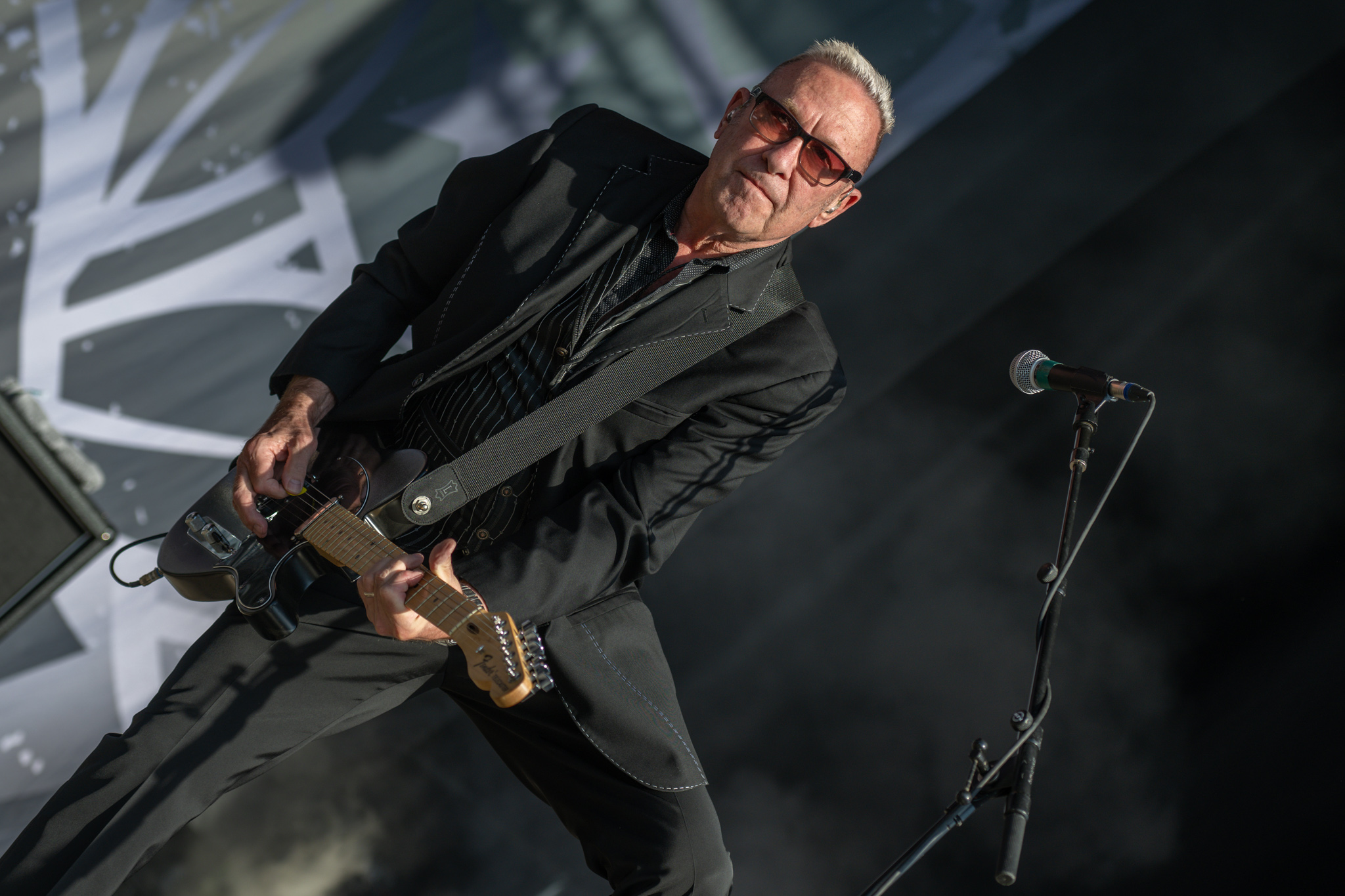
John Lilley

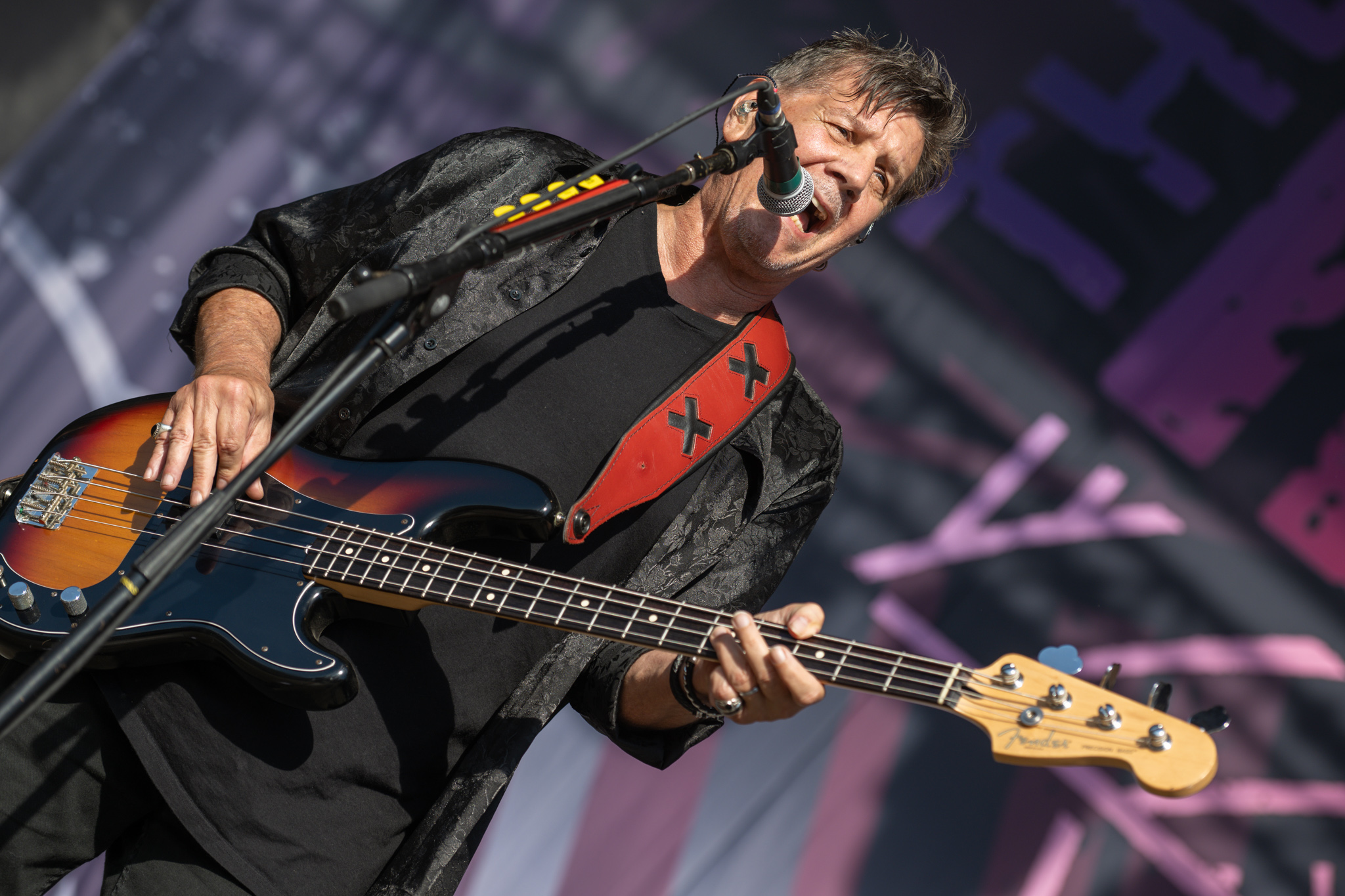
Fran Smith Jr.

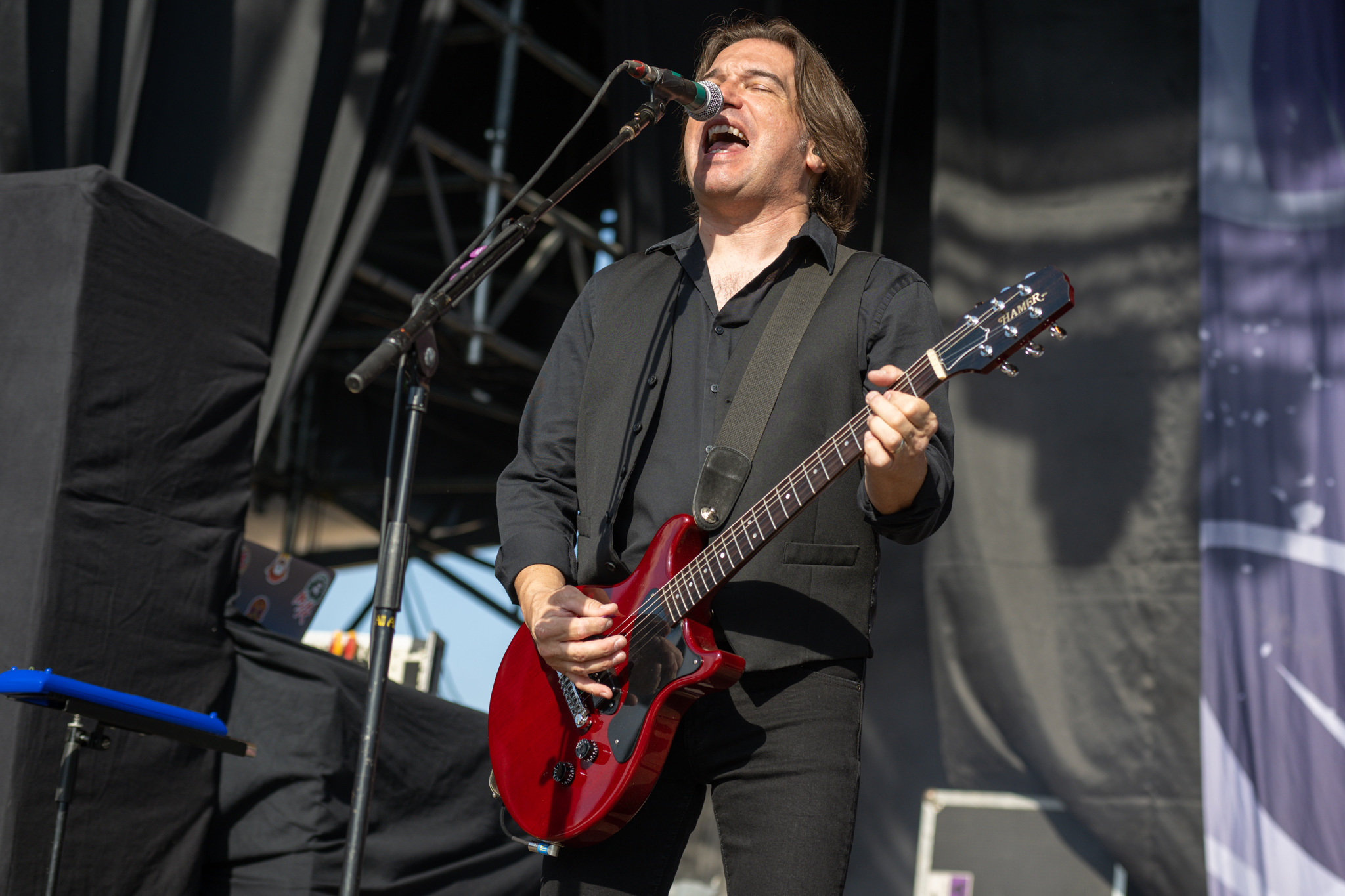
Tommy Williams

=== Current ===
- Eric Bazilian – lead vocals, guitar, mandolin, harmonica, saxophone, recording, melodica (1980–present)
- Rob Hyman – lead vocals, keyboards, accordion, melodica (1980–present)
- David Uosikkinen – drums, percussion (1980–present)
- John Lilley – guitar, mandolin, dobro, melodica, keyboards, background vocals (1983–present)
- Fran Smith Jr. – bass guitar, melodica, background vocals (1987–present)
- Tommy Williams – guitar, mandolin, mandola, melodica, background and occasional lead vocals (2010–present)

=== Former ===
- Bobby Woods – bass guitar (1980–1982; died 2010)
- John Kuzma – guitar, background and occasional lead vocals (1980–1982; died 2011)
- Rob Miller – bass guitar, background vocals (1983–1984)
- Andy King – bass guitar, background and occasional lead vocals (1984–1987)
- Mindy Jostyn – violin, harmonica, guitar, background vocals (1992–1993; died 2005)

== Discography ==
=== Studio albums ===
List of studio albums, with selected chart positions and certifications
Title	Details	Peak chart positions								Certifications (sales thresholds)
Title	Details	US	CAN	AUS	GER	SWE	NOR	JPN	SWI	Certifications (sales thresholds)
Amore	Released: December 1983; Label: Antenna (independent)	—	—	—	—	—	—	—	—	
Nervous Night	Released: April 26, 1985; Label: Columbia	12	39	12	41	46	—	—	—	AUS: Gold; CAN: Gold; US: 2× Platinum
One Way Home	Released: July 1987; Label: Columbia	27	59	81	17	12	15	—	14	US: Gold
Zig Zag	Released: October 26, 1989; Label: Columbia	115	59	—	—	13	12	73	—	SWE: Gold
Out of Body	Released: May 11, 1993; Label: MCA	—	—	—	59	13	12	67	33	SWE: Gold
Time Stand Still	Released: September 14, 2007; Label: Neo/Sony BMG (EUR) Megaforce/MRI Associated (US)	—	—	—	—	—	—	—	—	
Rocking & Swing	Released: May 12, 2023; Label: Self-released	—	—	—	—	—	—	—	—	
"—" denotes a recording that did not chart or was not released in that territory.

=== Live albums ===
List of live albums, with selected chart positions
Title	Details	Peak chart positions		
Title	Details	GER	SWE	SWI
The Hooters Live	Released: May 9, 1994; Label: MCA	40	25	46
Both Sides Live	Released: November 26, 2008; Label: Self-released	—	—	—
Give the Music Back: Live Double Album	Released: June 23, 2017; Label: Self-released	—	—	—
45 Alive – Keswick Live in Concert	Released: November 27, 2025; Label: Self-released	—	—	—
"—" denotes a recording that did not chart or was not released in that territory.

=== Selected compilations ===
List of compilation albums, with selected chart positions and certifications
Title	Details	Peak chart positions				Certifications (sales thresholds)
Title	Details	GER	SWE	NOR	SWI	Certifications (sales thresholds)
Greatest Hits	Released: 1992; Label: Columbia	21	21	—	—	GER: Gold^{[A]}; SWE: Gold
Greatest Hits Vol. 2	Released: 1994; Label: Columbia	47	—	—	33	
Hooterization: A Retrospective	Released: September 3, 1996; Label: Columbia	—	—	6^{[B]}	—	
"—" denotes a recording that did not chart or was not released in that territory.

Notes

- A It was a certification according to old criteria. Until September 24, 1999, Gold album was certified for sales of 250,000 and Platinum album for sales of 500,000 by International Federation of the Phonographic Industry, Germany (IFPI, Musik Industrie).
- B In Norway, this compilation was issued under the alternative title The Best of the Hooters.

=== Extended plays ===
List of extended plays
Title	Details
Five by Five	Released: November 16, 2010; Label: Self-released

=== Singles ===
List of singles, with selected chart positions, showing year released and album name
Single	Year	Peak chart positions										Album
Single	Year	US	CAN	AUS	NZ	NED	BEL	GER	SWE	IRE	UK	Album
"Fightin' on the Same Side"	1981	—	—	—	—	—	—	—	—	—	—	Non-album single
"All You Zombies"	1982	—	—	—	—	—	—	—	—	—	—	Amore
"Hanging on a Heartbeat"	1984	—	—	—	—	—	—	—	—	—	—	Amore
"All You Zombies"	1985	58	—	8	16	—	—	17	—	—	—	Nervous Night
"And We Danced"	1985	21	51	6	9	—	—	72	—	—	—	Nervous Night
"Day by Day"	1986	18	66	55	—	—	—	—	—	—	—	Nervous Night
"Where Do the Children Go"	1986	38	98	—	20	—	—	—	—	—	—	Nervous Night
"Johnny B"	1987	61	—	74	—	—	—	7	—	—	—	One Way Home
"Satellite"	1987	61	—	—	—	20	35	34	—	17	22	One Way Home
"Karla with a K"	1988	—	—	—	—	—	—	—	—	—	81	One Way Home
"Engine 999"	1988	—	—	—	—	—	—	—	—	—	—	One Way Home
"500 Miles"	1989	97	60	—	—	—	—	—	12	—	—	Zig Zag
"Brother, Don't You Walk Away"	1990	—	—	—	—	—	—	—	—	—	—	Zig Zag
"Heaven Laughs"	1990	—	—	—	—	—	—	—	—	—	—	Zig Zag
"Don't Knock It 'Til You Try It"	1990	—	—	—	—	—	—	—	—	—	—	Zig Zag
"Give the Music Back"	1990	—	—	—	—	—	—	—	—	—	—	Zig Zag
"Silent Night" (with Shawn Colvin)	1990	—	—	—	—	—	—	—	—	—	—	Acoustic Christmas (by various artists)
"Twenty Five Hours a Day"	1993	—	—	—	—	28	—	74	—	—	—	Out of Body
"Boys Will Be Boys"	1993	—	—	—	—	—	—	53	20	—	—	Out of Body
"Private Emotion"	1994	—	—	—	—	—	—	—	—	—	—	Out of Body
"Satellite '95"	1995	—	—	—	—	—	—	—	—	—	—	Non-album single
"Time Stand Still"	2008	—	—	—	—	—	—	—	—	—	—	Time Stand Still
"Pendulum"	2025	—	—	—	—	—	—	—	—	—	—	45 Alive – Keswick Live in Concert
"—" denotes a single that did not chart or was not released in that territory.

=== Video releases ===
List of videos, showing year released and types
Title	Year	Type of video
Nervous Night	1985	Film
All You Zombies	1985	Music video
And We Danced	1985	Music video
Day by Day	1986	Music video
The Ultimate Clip Collection	2003	DVD compilation
Why Won't You Call Me Back	2023	Music video

== Awards and nominations ==
Award	Year	Nominee(s)	Category	Result	Ref.
MTV Video Music Awards	1986	"And We Danced"	Best New Artist in a Video	Nominated	
Pollstar Concert Industry Awards	1986	Tour	Small Hall / Club Tour of the Year	Won	
Pollstar Concert Industry Awards	1986	Tour	Next Major Arena Headliner	Nominated	
