= Amor =

Amor ("love" in Latin, Spanish and Portuguese) may refer to:

== Arts, entertainment, media ==
- Amor (film), a 1940 Argentine comedy
- AMOR, a 1980 film by Robert Beavers from his cycle My Hand Outstretched to the Winged Distance and Sightless Measure
- WAMR-FM, branded as 107.5 Amor, a radio station in Miami, Florida
- WPAT-FM, branded as 93.1 Amor, a radio station in Paterson, New Jersey

=== Music ===
==== Albums ====
- Amor (Julio Iglesias album), 1982
- Amor (Andrea Bocelli album), 2006

==== Songs ====
- "Amor" (Achille Lauro song), 2025
- "Amor" (Los Auténticos Decadentes song), 2000
- "Amor" (Cristian Castro song), 1995
- "Amor" (Emmanuel Cortes song), 2024
- "Amor" (Gabriel Ruiz song), recorded by Bing Crosby in 1944, Ben E. King in 1961, and Luis Miguel in 2001
- "Amor" (Ricky Martin song), 2001

== People and figures ==
- Amor (name), a list of notable people with the name
- Amor, the Roman deity Cupid

== Other uses ==
- 1221 Amor, an asteroid
- Amor asteroid, a group of near-Earth asteroids named after 1221 Amor
- Amor (automobile), a German car

== See also ==
- Amor Amor (disambiguation)
- Amora (disambiguation)
- Amore (disambiguation)
- Ay Amor (disambiguation)
- Love (disambiguation) (Romance languages: Amor)
