= De amore =

De amore (Latin "On Love") may refer to:

- De amore (Andreas Capellanus) (1186–1190)
- De amore by Marsilio Ficino (1484)

== See also ==
- D'Amore (disambiguation)
- Amor (disambiguation)
- Love
