= Damore =

Damore is a surname. Notable people with the surname include:

- James Damore, author of Google's Ideological Echo Chamber
- John Damore (born 1933), American football player
- Nick Damore (1916–1969), Canadian ice hockey player

== See also ==
- D'Amore (disambiguation)
