= D'Amore =

D'Amore may refer to:

== People ==
- Angela D'Amore (born 1971), Australian politician
- Caroline D'Amore (born 1984), American model and actress
- Crescenzo D'Amore (1979–2024), Italian road cyclist
- Hallie D'Amore (1942-2006), American make-up artist
- Marco D'Amore (born 1981), Italian actor, film director, and screenwriter
- Patricia D'Amore (active from 1973), American academic at Harvard Medical School
- Scott D'Amore (born 1974), Canadian wrestler

== Instruments ==
- Clarinet d'amore, woodwind instrument
- Flute d'amore, woodwind instrument
- Oboe d'amore, woodwind instrument
- Viola d'amore, string instrument

== See also ==
- Amore (disambiguation)
- De amore (disambiguation)
- Damore
