= Mi Amor (Souf song) =

2016 song by Souf

Single by Souf

from the album Alchimie
- Released: 26 February 2016
- Genre: Latin pop
- Length: 4:07
- Songwriter: Souf
- Producer: Souf

Souf singles chronology
"Mi Amor" (2016)	"Mea Culpa" (2016)

Music video
- "Mi Amor" on YouTube

"Mi Amor" is a song by French singer Souf. It was released as the debut single from his debut album Alchimie. The music video has over 210 million views.

== Charts ==
Chart performance for "Mi Amor"
Chart	Peak position
Belgium (Ultratop 50 Wallonia)	43
France (SNEP)	23
