= Amor (name) =

Amor is a name from Latin amor, meaning 'love'.

Notable people with the name include:

== First name ==
- Amor De Cosmos (1825–1897), Canadian journalist, publisher and politician
- Amor Deloso, Filipino politician
- Amor Jebali (born 1956), Tunisian footballer
- Amor Kehiha (born 1977), French-Algerian footballer
- Amor Mašović (born 1955), Bosnian politician

== Surname ==
- Bill Amor (1919–1988), English amateur footballer
- Emiliano Amor (born 1995), Argentine footballer
- Eugene Amor, Secretary of Finance of the Federated States of Micronesia
- Gemma Amor, British writer
- Guillermo Amor (born 1967), Spanish footballer
- Kyle Amor (born 1987), English rugby league player
- Kyle Alandy Amor, American visual artist, model, singer and actor
- Pita Amor (1918–2000), Mexican poet
- Rick Amor (born 1948), Australian painter
- Shaul Amor (1940–2004), Israeli politician
- Simon Amor (born 1979), English rugby union player
- Bernardo Sepúlveda Amor (born 1941), Mexican diplomat.
