= Amora London =

Coordinates: 51°30′37″N 0°8′2″W

Amora London was a European touring exhibition dedicated to love, relationships, and sexual well-being.

Covering nine zones, Amora London was the world's first visitor attraction dedicated to these themes. The first city toured was London in England, where Amora ran for 15 months starting April 2007. It was located near Piccadilly Circus on Coventry Street in Central London.

Media reports in the United Kingdom from reputable sources such as the BBC discussed the event, leading to headlines such as, "Let's Talk about Sex In The City" (in reference to the HBO series Sex and the City).

The international art dealer Delia Cabral, of DCA Fine Art, was also heavily involved in the production of this exhibition.

== Comments ==
Tracey Cox, a sex and relationship expert, said, "You can walk into that place knowing nothing about relationships or sex and come out pretty much knowing everything there is to know, and able to go and have a very satisfying relationship."

Dr. Sarah Brewer, director of exhibits at the exhibition said: "The British have been very reserved about sex but are now more open than they have ever been."

Sex therapist Anne Hooper said: "London has needed a public center for sex information for many years. It’s no coincidence that only now, in 2007, we can be open and frank enough for such an institution to be acceptable."

Kevan Wylie, General Secretary of the European Federation of Sexology commented: "I am pleased to support the launch of Amora. Anything that helps people to have the confidence to share ideas, desires, and wishes with their partners must be welcomed and encouraged.
