= Un amore =

Un amore may refer to:

- Un amore (1965 film), a film starring Rossano Brazzi
- Un amore (1999 film), a film starring Fabrizio Gifuni
- Un amore (novel), a novel by Dino Buzzati
