= Amor (automobile) =

The Amor was a small German automobile built in limited numbers in Cologne (Prussia) from 1924 to 1925. The car had a 16 hp four-cylinder proprietary engine. Its name means "love" in Latin, Spanish and Portuguese.
