= 1986 MTV Video Music Awards =

Award ceremony

- Date: Friday, September 5, 1986
- Location: Universal Amphitheatre, Los Angeles; Palladium, New York City
- Country: United States
- Hosted by: Downtown Julie Brown; Mark Goodman; Alan Hunter; Martha Quinn and Dweezil Zappa
- Most awards: A-ha (8)
- Most nominations: A-ha and Dire Straits (11 each)

Television/radio coverage
- Network: MTV
- Produced by: Don Ohlmeyer; Bob Pittman
- Directed by: Don Ohlmeyer

The 1986 MTV Video Music Awards aired live on September 5, 1986, honoring the best music videos from May 2, 1985, to May 1, 1986. The show was hosted by MTV VJs Downtown Julie Brown, Mark Goodman, Alan Hunter, Martha Quinn, and Dweezil Zappa, and it emanated primarily from both the Palladium in New York City and the Universal Amphitheatre in Los Angeles. Other parts of the show, however, took place in various locations such as London, Miami, and New Haven, Connecticut.

The night's biggest winner and one of the year's two most nominated artists was Norwegian group a-ha, which won eight out of eleven awards it was in contention for. Their video for "Take On Me" earned six awards out of eight nominations, including Viewer's Choice, while "The Sun Always Shines on T.V." won two awards out of three nominations.

The other most nominated artist was rock group Dire Straits, whose video for "Money for Nothing" also earned eleven nominations and won two awards, including Video of the Year. Thus, "Money for Nothing" was also the most nominated video at the 1986 VMAs.

== Background ==
MTV announced in June that the 1986 Video Music Awards would be held at New York's Palladium and Los Angeles's Universal Amphitheatre on September 5. Nominees were announced on August 4. The decision to broadcast the ceremony from multiple venues came out of a desire to make the ceremony more casual, as did the decisions to forego a traditional host, present awards throughout the venues instead of at a lectern, and loosen time limitations. Winners were selected by a group of over 1,700 individuals from the recording industry. The ceremony was preceded by a two-hour MTV VMA 1986 Pre-Game Show special. Hosted by Bob Costas and Huey Lewis, the pre-taped special highlighted the nominees.

== Performances ==
List of musical performances
Artist(s)	Song(s)	Ref.
Robert Palmer	"Addicted to Love"	
The Hooters	"And We Danced" "Nervous Night"	
The Monkees	"I'm a Believer" "Daydream Believer"	
'Til Tuesday	"What About Love"	
INXS	"What You Need"	
Van Halen	"Best of Both Worlds" "Love Walks In" (Pre-taped from New Haven, CT)	
Mr. Mister	"Kyrie" "Broken Wings"	
Simply Red	"Holding Back the Years" "Money's Too Tight (To Mention)"	
Whitney Houston	"How Will I Know" "Greatest Love of All"	
Pet Shop Boys	"Love Comes Quickly" "West End Girls"	
Tina Turner	"Typical Male"	
Genesis	"Throwing It All Away" (From London)	

Robert Palmer, The Monkees, INXS, Mr. Mister, Whitney Houston, and Pet Shop Boys performed from Los Angeles. The Hooters, 'Til Tuesday, Simply Red, and Tina Turner performed from New York.

== Presenters ==
- Jay Leno – presented Best Stage Performance in a Video
- Joe Davola and Alan Hunter – talked about the Viewer's Choice award and introduced the nominees
- Janet Jackson – presented Best Choreography in a Video
- Bobcat Goldthwait – presented Best Concept Video
- Steven Wright – introduced the winners of Best Editing in a Video and Best Cinematography in a Video
- Don Johnson – presented Best Female Video
- The Bangles – presented Best Overall Performance in a Video
- Robert Palmer – presented the Video Vanguard Award to Madonna
- Pet Shop Boys – presented the Video Vanguard Award to Zbigniew Rybczyński
- Bananarama – introduced the winner of Best Art Direction in a Video
- Martha Quinn – presented the Special Recognition Award to Jack Healey
- Whitney Houston – presented Best Male Video
- Steve Winwood – presented Best Direction in a Video
- Gilbert Gottfried – introduced the winner of Best Special Effects in a Video
- David Lee Roth – presented Best Group Video
- Elvira, Mistress of the Dark – introduced the world premiere of Don Johnson's video for "Heartbeat"
- Bob Costas – introduced a segment on the ties between sports and music called "Rock 'n Roll Sports"
- Belinda Carlisle – presented Best New Artist in a Video
- Robin Williams – presented the Special Recognition Award to Bill Graham
- Paul McCartney – introduced Tina Turner
- Mötley Crüe (Vince Neil and Tommy Lee) – presented Most Experimental Video
- Van Halen – presented Viewer's Choice
- Don Henley – presented Video of the Year

== Winners and nominees ==
Winners are listed first and highlighted in bold.

Video of the Year	Best Male Video
**Dire Straits – "Money for Nothing"**; a-ha – "Take On Me"; Godley & Creme – "Cry"; Robert Palmer – "Addicted to Love"; Talking Heads – "Road to Nowhere"	**Robert Palmer – "Addicted to Love"**; Bryan Adams – "Summer of '69"; Phil Collins – "Take Me Home"; Bruce Springsteen – "Glory Days"; Sting – "If You Love Somebody Set Them Free"
Best Female Video	Best Group Video
**Whitney Houston – "How Will I Know"**; Kate Bush – "Running Up That Hill"; Aretha Franklin – "Freeway of Love"; Grace Jones – "Slave to the Rhythm"; Tina Turner – "We Don't Need Another Hero"	**Dire Straits – "Money for Nothing"**; a-ha – "Take On Me"; INXS – "What You Need"; The Rolling Stones – "Harlem Shuffle"; Talking Heads – "And She Was"
Best New Artist in a Video	Best Concept Video
**a-ha – "Take On Me"**; The Hooters – "And We Danced"; Whitney Houston – "How Will I Know"; Pet Shop Boys – "West End Girls"; Simply Red – "Holding Back the Years"	**a-ha – "Take On Me"**; Dire Straits – "Money for Nothing"; Godley & Creme – "Cry"; Talking Heads – "And She Was"; Talking Heads – "Road to Nowhere"
Most Experimental Video	Best Stage Performance in a Video
**a-ha – "Take On Me"**; Pat Benatar – "Sex as a Weapon"; Dire Straits – "Money for Nothing"; X – "Burning House of Love"; ZZ Top – "Rough Boy"	**Bryan Adams and Tina Turner – "It's Only Love"**; Dire Straits – "Money for Nothing"; Huey Lewis and the News – "The Power of Love"; Robert Palmer – "Addicted to Love"; Pete Townshend – "Face the Face"
Best Overall Performance in a Video	Best Direction in a Video
**David Bowie and Mick Jagger – "Dancing in the Street"**; Dire Straits – "Money for Nothing"; Robert Palmer – "Addicted to Love"; Bruce Springsteen – "Glory Days"; Sting – "If You Love Somebody Set Them Free"	**a-ha – "Take On Me" (Director: Steven Barron)**; Pat Benatar – "Sex as a Weapon" (Director: Daniel Kleinman); Dire Straits – "Money for Nothing" (Director: Steven Barron); X – "Burning House of Love" (Director: Daniel Kleinman); ZZ Top – "Rough Boy" (Director: Steven Barron)
Best Choreography in a Video	Best Special Effects in a Video
**Prince and The Revolution – "Raspberry Beret" (Choreographer: Prince)**; Pat Benatar – "Sex as a Weapon" (Choreographer: Russell Clark); Morris Day – "The Oak Tree" (Choreographers: Russell Clark and Morris Day); Madonna – "Dress You Up" (Choreographer: Brad Jeffries); Madonna – "Like a Virgin (live)" (Choreographer: Brad Jeffries)	**a-ha – "Take On Me" (Special Effects: Michael Patterson and Candace Reckinger)**; Pat Benatar – "Sex as a Weapon" (Special Effects: Daniel Kleinman and Richard Uber); Dire Straits – "Money for Nothing" (Special Effects: Ian Pearson); X – "Burning House of Love" (Special Effects: Daniel Kleinman); ZZ Top – "Rough Boy" (Special Effects: Max Anderson and Chris Nibley)
Best Art Direction in a Video	Best Editing in a Video
**ZZ Top – "Rough Boy" (Art Director: Ron Cobb)**; a-ha – "The Sun Always Shines on T.V." (Art Director: Stefan Roman); Pat Benatar – "Sex as a Weapon" (Art Director: Daniel Kleinman); Dire Straits – "Money for Nothing" (Art Director: Steven Barron); Honeymoon Suite – "Feel It Again" (Art Director: David Brockhurst)	**a-ha – "The Sun Always Shines on T.V." (Editor: David Yardley)**; Pat Benatar – "Sex as a Weapon" (Editor: Richard Uber); Dire Straits – "Money for Nothing" (Editor: David Yardley); X – "Burning House of Love" (Editor: Dan Blevins); ZZ Top – "Rough Boy" (Editor: Richard Uber)
Best Cinematography in a Video	Viewer's Choice
**a-ha – "The Sun Always Shines on T.V." (Director of Photography: Oliver Stapleton)**; Pat Benatar – "Sex as a Weapon" (Director of Photography: Peter Mackay); Joe Walsh – "The Confessor" (Director of Photography: Jan Kiesser and Ken Barrows); X – "Burning House of Love" (Director of Photography: Ken Barrows); ZZ Top – "Rough Boy" (Director of Photography: Chris Nibley)	**a-ha – "Take On Me"**; Dire Straits – "Money for Nothing"; Godley & Creme – "Cry"; Robert Palmer – "Addicted to Love"; Talking Heads – "Road to Nowhere"
Video Vanguard Award
**Madonna**; **Zbigniew Rybczyński**
Special Recognition Award
**Bill Graham**; **Jack Healey**

== Artists with multiple wins and nominations ==
Artists who received multiple awards
Wins	Artist
8	a-ha
2	Dire Straits

Artists who received multiple nominations
Nominations	Artist
11	a-ha
11	Dire Straits
7	Pat Benatar
6	ZZ Top
5	Robert Palmer
5	Talking Heads
5	X
3	Godley & Creme
2	Bruce Springsteen
2	Bryan Adams
2	Madonna
2	Sting
2	Tina Turner
2	Whitney Houston

== Music Videos with multiple wins and nominations ==
Music Videos that received multiple awards
Wins	Artist	Music Video
6	a-ha	"Take On Me"
2	a-ha	"The Sun Always Shines on T.V."
2	Dire Straits	"Money for Nothing"

Music Videos that received multiple nominations
Nominations	Artist	Music Video
11	Dire Straits	"Money for Nothing"
8	a-ha	"Take On Me"
7	Pat Benatar	"Sex as a Weapon"
6	ZZ Top	"Rough Boy"
5	Robert Palmer	"Addicted to Love"
5	X	"Burning House of Love"
3	a-ha	"The Sun Always Shines on T.V."
3	Godley & Creme	"Cry"
3	Talking Heads	"Road to Nowhere"
2	Bruce Springsteen	"Glory Days"
2	Sting	"If You Love Somebody Set Them Free"
2	Talking Heads	"And She Was"
2	Whitney Houston	"How Will I Know"

== Other appearances ==
- Adam Whittaker – accepted the Best Editing and Best Cinematography awards on behalf of David Yardley and Oliver Stapleton
- Grace Jones – accepted the Best Overall Performance award on behalf of David Bowie and Mick Jagger
- Simon Fields – accepted the Best Direction award on behalf of Steve Barron
- Rod Stewart – appeared in a pre-commercial vignette via satellite
