= La Familia André =

La Familia André is a popular Dominican merengue band founded by the late Fernando Echavarría.
