= And We Danced (The Hooters song) =

Single by the Hooters

from the album Nervous Night
- B-side: "Blood from a Stone"
- Released: 1985
- Genre: Power pop; new wave
- Length: 3:48
- Label: Columbia
- Songwriters: Eric Bazilian; Rob Hyman
- Producer: Rick Chertoff

The Hooters singles chronology
"All You Zombies" (1982)	"And We Danced" (1985)	"Day by Day (The Hooters song)" (1985)

Music video
- "And We Danced" on YouTube

"And We Danced" is a song by the American rock band the Hooters, released as a single in 1985. The song appeared on the band's second album, Nervous Night. It peaked at No. 21 on the US Billboard Hot 100 and reached No. 3 on the Mainstream Rock chart. "And We Danced" became the band's second consecutive Top 10 hit in Australia, reaching No. 6.

The Hooters performed "And We Danced" at the Live Aid benefit concert in Philadelphia on July 13, 1985.

The music video for the song was nominated for the Best New Artist award at the 1986 MTV Video Music Awards. The video featured live footage of the band filmed at the now-demolished Exton Drive-In in Exton, Pennsylvania.

== Background ==
Singer Eric Bazilian said:

We wrote the first draft of “And We Danced” in the Poconos during the summer of 1984. I think we knew immediately that we had the germ of something special though there were a lot of versions between that one and the one we now know. I honestly don’t know where the lyrics came from… the verses were written last, when we were already mixing the rest of the album and were down to the wire. I think we just liked the way “she was a be bop baby” sounded.

The song is notable for its distinct instrumentation, featuring Eric Bazilian on mandolin, and Rob Hyman on the melodica, blending traditional folk instruments with 1980s power pop. This specific instrumental pairing is also highlighted on the song's single release cover art, which depicts the band members holding both instruments.

== Reception and accolades ==
Cash Box said that the song shows the "band’s flair vocally and instrumentally" and has "an appealing Springsteen-like purely American sound."

"And We Danced" was ranked as the 88th greatest song of the 1980s on internet radio station WDDF Radio's "The 88 Greatest Songs of the 80's" second annual Independence Day countdown in 2017.

== Cover versions ==
Canadian duo Sons of Maxwell covered the song on their 1998 album The Neighbourhood. Their version was released as a single in 1999 and peaked at number 54 on RPM's Country Tracks.

Fellow Philadelphia artist Atom and His Package incorporated a cover of the chorus into the end of his 1997 song "Goalie" off the A Society of People Named Elihu album.

British/Australian folk duo The April Maze released a cover of the song on their 2012 album Two.

== Personnel ==
- Rob Hyman – lead vocals, keyboards, melodica
- Eric Bazilian – lead vocals, electric guitar, mandolin
- Andy King – bass, background vocals
- John Lilley – electric and acoustic guitars, keyboards, melodica
- David Uosikkinen – drums

== Charts ==
=== Weekly charts ===
Chart (1985)	Peak position
Australia (Kent Music Report)	6
Germany (Media Control Charts)	72
New Zealand (Recorded Music NZ)	9
U.S. Billboard Hot 100	21

=== Year-end charts ===
Chart (1985)	Position
Australia (Kent Music Report)	43
