= All You Zombies (song) =

- 7" single cover (1985)

Single by The Hooters

from the album Amore and Nervous Night
- B-side: "Rescue Me" (Original Live Release) "Nervous Night" (1985 Extended Studio Version) "Where Do the Children Go" (1986 UK Re-Releases)
- Released: 1982 (original live release); 1983 (first studio version); 1985 (extended second studio version)
- Length: 4:09 (original live release); 3:47 (first studio version); 5:54 (extended second studio version)
- Label: Eighty Percent (1982); Antenna (1983); Columbia (1985)
- Songwriters: Eric Bazilian, Rob Hyman
- Producer: Rick Chertoff

The Hooters singles chronology
"Fightin' on the Same Side" (1981)	"All You Zombies" (1982)	"Hanging on a Heartbeat" (1984)
"Hanging on a Heartbeat" (1984)	"All You Zombies" (1985)	"And We Danced" (1985)

Alternative cover
- 7" live single cover (1982)

Audio sample
- file; help

Music video
- "All You Zombies" on YouTube

"All You Zombies" is a song by American rock band the Hooters, written by the band's founding members Eric Bazilian and Rob Hyman. It was first recorded live and released as a single in 1982. A studio re-recording was subsequently included on the band's debut album, Amore (1983), and another extended re-recording of the song was included on their second album, Nervous Night (1985). This third version was released as a single in 1985 and reached No. 58 on the US Billboard Hot 100. It also charted within the top 20 in Germany and New Zealand, but was most successful in Australia, where it reached number 8 on the charts in 1985.

The song also received a music video in May 1985 that was directed by David Cammel. By the following month, the music video was receiving medium rotation on MTV.

== Background ==
Influenced by reggae music, co-writer Eric Bazilian said the band was working on a different song when the idea "just came to us, like a vision." The band members dropped their work on the other song and finished "All You Zombies" that night. Writing partner Rob Hyman believed the song to be the fastest they had written "that was of any quality."

The Hooters first released a version of "All You Zombies" recorded live at the Emerald City nightclub in Cherry Hill, New Jersey, on 11 April 1981. The single was released in 1982 by Eighty Percent Records. A different version of the song later appeared on the Amore album, released independently in 1983. Hyman and Bazilian had worked with Cyndi Lauper on her album She's So Unusual, which led to Columbia Records offering the band a contract. They again re-recorded "All You Zombies" with additional instrumental sections, making the song almost six minutes long. It became a minor hit in the US, reaching the Billboard Hot 100 chart, and a top 10 success in Australia, where it peaked at No. 8 for two weeks in September 1985. The single also reached the top 20 in New Zealand and Germany.

Eric Bazilian told the Chicago Tribune in 1985 that he didn't know the meaning of the song despite having written it. "People ask us what it's about ... the weird thing is we didn't consciously put [the heavy stuff] there." Hyman later told Songfacts that the biblical images, including Moses and Noah, were not part of any agenda, though some radio stations refused to play it. "I love songs like that, you just listen and every time you hear it you kind of wonder what's going on."

== Reception ==
Pitchfork said the song "was all over the airwaves in 1985, and for good reason: its arena-sized fusion of desert-dusted folk song and melodramatic synth pop exemplifies mid-80s mainstream American rock as much as their poofy haircuts and oversized, shoulder-padded blazers." Cashbox wrote that the song had a "distinct rock bite" and incorporated "reggae/dance rhythms to form an excellent crossover track."

== Personnel ==
- Eric Bazilian – lead vocals, lead and slide guitar
- Rob Hyman – hammond organ, harmony vocals
- Andy King – bass, background vocals
- John Lilley – rhythm guitar
- David Uosikkinen – drums

== Formats and track listings ==
- 7" single (1982)

A. "All You Zombies" (Live) – 4:09
B. "Rescue Me" – 4:03

- 7" single (1985)

A. "All You Zombies" (Long) – 5:54
B. "Nervous Night" – 3:57

- 12" promo single (1985)

A. "All You Zombies" (Long) – 5:54
B. "All You Zombies" (Short) – 3:52

- 12" single (1986)

A. "All You Zombies" (Extended Version) – 5:58
B. "Where Do the Children Go" (Extended Version) – 5:29

== Charts ==
=== Weekly charts ===
Chart (1985)	Peak position
Australia (Kent Music Report)	8
Germany (Media Control)	17
New Zealand (RIANZ)	16
US Hot 100 (Billboard)	58
US Mainstream Rock (Billboard)	11

=== Year-end charts ===
Chart (1985)	Position
Australia (Kent Music Report)	69

== Cover versions ==
- The song was covered by German singer Sandra for her eighth studio album, The Art of Love (2007). It was then released as a promotional single to radio stations in Poland where it received considerable airplay.
- German band Santiano covered the song in German as "Bis in alle Ewigkeit (Walhalla)" on their 2013 album Mit den Gezeiten. They changed the lyrics into a song about the Vikings going to Valhalla.
