= Rick Chertoff =

American record producer and songwriter

- Born: Richard E. Chertoff; March 29, 1950 (age 75); New York, U.S.
- Occupations: Record producer; songwriter

Richard E. Chertoff (born March 29, 1950) is an American record producer and songwriter. He is credited on the singles Joan Osborne's "One of Us", Cyndi Lauper's "Girls Just Want to Have Fun" and "Time After Time" and Sophie B. Hawkins' "Damn I Wish I Was Your Lover". Chertoff has received five Grammy Award nominations—twice for Album of the Year, twice for Record of the Year, and also for Producer of the Year.

== Biography ==
Chertoff attended the University of Pennsylvania, and whilst in Philadelphia he met soon-to-be long-time friends Rob Hyman and Eric Bazilian and formed a lasting musical collaboration. Chertoff played drums in a local band "Wax" with Hyman and later produced and played with the band Baby Grand, which included both Hyman and Bazilian. He was a force behind the signing of Hyman and Bazilian's later band, the Hooters to Columbia Records, where he produced their multi-platinum albums, Nervous Night, One Way Home, and Zig Zag.

Chertoff's A&R career began under the training of Clive Davis at the inception of Arista Records. In his A&R/production role, Chertoff signed and produced, edited and remixed tracks for Arista artists including the Kinks and the Alan Parsons Project. Chertoff's Arista career culminated in his co-production of Air Supply's first million-seller, Lost in Love as well as his co-production of the theme from Steven Spielberg's Close Encounters of the Third Kind with composer John Williams.

In 1980, Chertoff joined Columbia Records, becoming Senior Vice President of A&R in 1989. He signed artists such as the Band and Sophie B. Hawkins, and brought in label deals such as Ruffhouse Records which resulted in albums from the Fugees, Lauryn Hill, Wyclef Jean, Kris Kross, and Cypress Hill.

One of Chertoff's biggest successes in his Columbia days was producing Lauper's debut album, She's So Unusual. The album sold 9 million copies with hits such as "Girls Just Wanna Have Fun", "All Through the Night", "When You Were Mine" and "Money Changes Everything." He brought together Hyman and Lauper who co-wrote the #1 hit, "Time After Time." Lauper and Chertoff then teamed up to write the hit, "She Bop."

In 1992, Chertoff started his Blue Gorilla label at Polygram. Blue Gorilla issued Joan Osborne's Relish, a multi-platinum album and worldwide hit which also garnered 7 Grammy nominations, including 'producer of the year'.

Chertoff co-wrote and co-produced the song "Christmas of Love" for Ron Howard's film How the Grinch Stole Christmas and he co-wrote and co-produced the theme for Jerry Zucker's film, Rat Race with Jon Carin from Pink Floyd and songwriter David Forman, who also performed the lead vocals for each song.

He has produced the Dream Jam Band, a group that writes and performs music for family audiences.

Largo is based on the second movement of Dvorak's "Symphony from the New World." The album, which Chertoff co-produced and co-wrote, features David Forman, the Chieftains, Taj Mahal, Garth Hudson, Levon Helm, Lauper, Osborne, Carole King, Hyman and Bazilian and uses Dvorak's journey to America as a tapestry of American blues and folk music. He is in collaboration to bring Largo to the stage.
