= David Uosikkinen =

American drummer

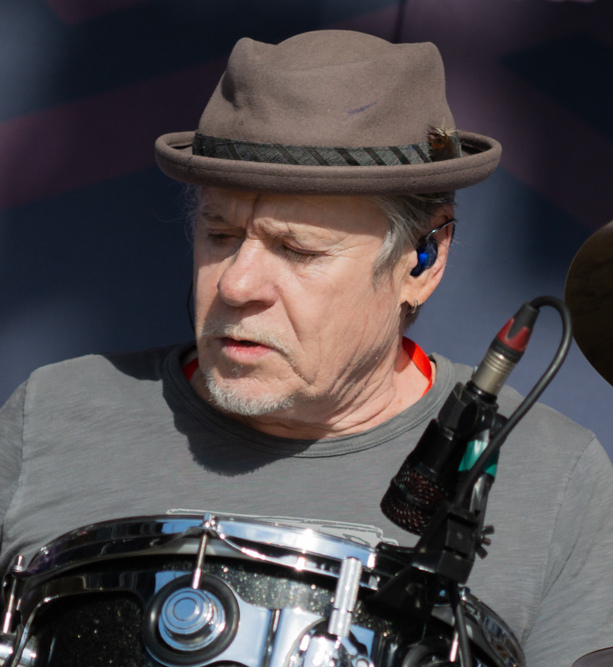
- David Uosikkinen (2022)

Background information
- Born: David Uosikkinen; February 11, 1956 (age 70); Cheltenham, Pennsylvania, U.S.
- Genre: Rock
- Instrument: Drums
- Years active: 1978–present
- Member of: The Hooters
- Website: http://www.daveuosikkinen.com/

David Uosikkinen (born February 11, 1956) is an American drummer and Internet content manager, best known for being a member of rock band The Hooters.

== Early life ==
Born in Cheltenham, Pennsylvania, U.S., Uosikkinen grew up in Levittown, Pennsylvania and at eight years old, took up the trumpet. His father regularly took him to see jazz bands at the Lambertville Music Circus and after he saw The Beatles perform on The Ed Sullivan Show on February 9, 1964, Uosikkinen realized that music and being in a band was what he wanted to pursue with his life. He eventually turned to the drums when a neighbor let him play on his new set.

He graduated from Woodrow Wilson (now Harry S. Truman) High School in 1974, where he participated in gymnastics. After high school, Uosikkinen played in a number of Philadelphia area bands, including The Kooks, The Torpedoes, Hot Property and Youth Camp.

Uosikkinen's parents are both immigrants from Finland.

== Tenure with The Hooters ==
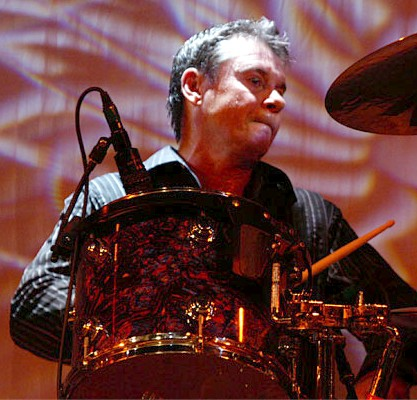
Uosikkinen performing in 2007

In 1980, Uosikkinen joined Philadelphia musicians Rob Hyman and Eric Bazilian when they decided to try something new by combining reggae, ska, and rock and roll to create The Hooters.

Nervous Night, The Hooters' 1985 debut on Columbia Records, sold in excess of 2 million copies and included Billboard Top 40 hits "Day By Day" (#18), "And We Danced" (#21) and "Where Do The Children Go" (#38).

After releasing six albums, The Hooters obtained a large global following throughout the 1980s and 1990s. As a result, they were asked to open three major musical events of the late 20th century: Live Aid in Philadelphia in 1985, Amnesty International Concert at Giants Stadium in 1986, and Roger Waters' The Wall Concert in Berlin in 1990. In 1995, The Hooters went on hiatus.

Uosikkinen reunited with The Hooters on successful headlining European summer tours in 2003 to 2005.

2007 saw the release of Time Stand Still, their first album of new material since 1993.

== Other musical projects ==
In 1994, Uosikkinen and entrepreneur, Dave Macrae, launched an independent record label, Moskeeto Records.

In 2010, Uosikkinen began his project, In The Pocket: Essential Songs of Philadelphia creating a fund raising campaign for the Settlement Music School. In The Pocket is recording the "essential songs" Of Philadelphia.

Documentary music videos are being recorded and songs can be downloaded at the project's website and on iTunes. Others working on the project include Eric Bazilian and Rob Hyman of The Hooters, Jeffrey Gaines, Richard Bush and Rick DiFonzo of The A's, Greg Davis of Beru Revue, and William Wittman of Too Much Joy.

== Career in technology ==
In 1999, Uosikkinen was asked to join a group of technology experts and music aficionados who created an online music portal, MP3.com, which subsequently changed the music industry's distribution and consumer listening habits.

In 2005, Uosikkinen took a position at another technology company, MP3tunes, a Music Service Provider (MSP) and originator of Oboe, a system that allowed unlimited online storage for users. In 2006, he went on to manage content for VMix, a site that featured music videos and other compositions by film makers in various genres.

Currently, when not touring or recording with The Hooters, Uosikkinen works at 6StringMedia, a web development and marketing company.

In January 2009, Uosikkinen launched Dave U Drums, an internet service where musicians send him an outline of a song, pay a recording fee, and Uosikkinen will deliver a finished drum track within 72 hours.

== Personal life ==
Uosikkinen moved to California in 1991, initially to Los Angeles before moving to San Diego. He moved back to Philadelphia in 2009 where he resides with his wife. He has one son born in 1990.
