= John Lilley =

American musician

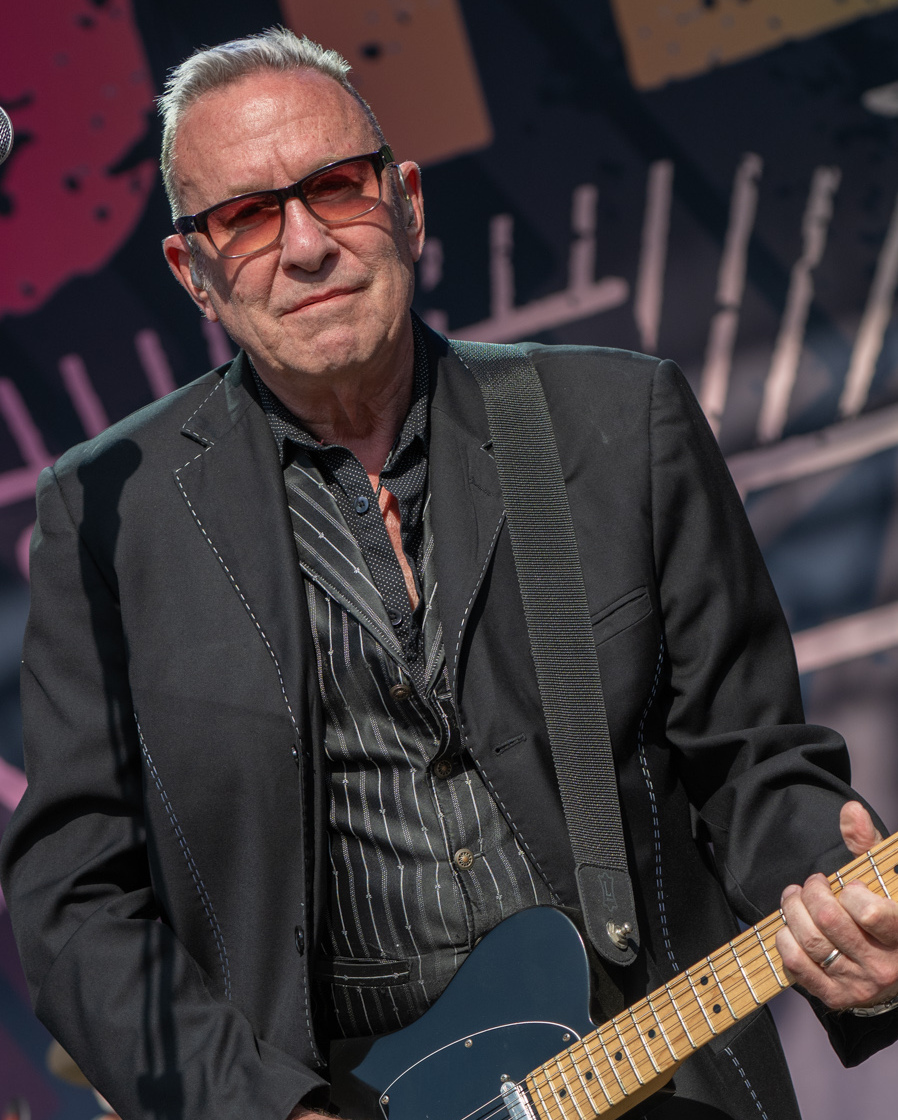
- Lilley performing with the Hooters in 2022

Background information
- Born: March 3, 1954 (age 72); West Chester, Pennsylvania, U.S.
- Genre: Rock
- Occupations: Musician, songwriter
- Instruments: Guitar, vocals, mandolin, dobro, keyboards, melodica
- Years active: 1978–present
- Member of: The Hooters
- Website: www.johnlilley.com

John Lilley (born March 3, 1954) is an American guitarist, singer, songwriter and a member of rock band the Hooters.

== Early life ==
John Lilley learned to play the guitar at nine years old after he saw the Beatles perform on The Ed Sullivan Show on February 9, 1964. He initially learned to play jazz and folk music, with his first teacher being folk and bluegrass expert Jerry Ricks. He eventually studied jazz improvisation with Dennis Sandole and then jazz, theory, orchestration, composition and arranging with Calvin Harris. Lilley also participated in visual arts, drawing voraciously while in school and mostly painting as an adult.

== Music career ==
In his twenties during the mid-1970s, Lilley got involved in the local Philadelphia rock music scene, as the manager and guitarist of the Get Right Band and later became the guitarist for Robert Hazard and the Heroes, who went on to write Cyndi Lauper's hit "Girls Just Wanna Have Fun".

=== The Hooters ===
After departing the Heroes, Lilley joined another local Philadelphia band, the Hooters, in 1983. He is a guitarist for the band.

The Hooters first gained major commercial success in the United States in the mid-1980s due to heavy radio airplay and MTV rotation of several songs, including "All You Zombies", "Day by Day", "And We Danced" and "Where Do the Children Go". The band played at three major musical events of the late 20th century: Live Aid in Philadelphia in 1985, Amnesty International concert at Giants Stadium in 1986, and Roger Waters' The Wall Concert in Berlin in 1990.

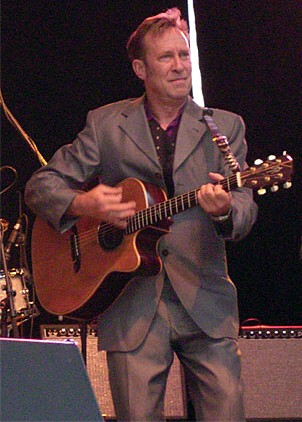
Lilley performing with the Hooters in 2007

The Hooters went on hiatus in 1995. Lilley reunited with the Hooters on headlining European summer tours in 2003, 2004 and 2005. The year 2007 saw the release of Time Stand Still, their first album of new material since 1993. The Hooters released Rocking and Swing in 2023, supported by a tour of the United States with Rick Springfield.

=== Other musical projects ===
In addition to his work with the Hooters, Lilley has composed and performed several theatre and dance scores.

Lilley contributed music to Sister Carrie, a play that was adapted by Louis Lippa from Theodore Dreiser's 1900 novel of the same name and performed at the People's Light and Theatre Company in Malvern in 1991. Lilley also contributed to Collecting Gravity, which was performed in 1992 by the Terry Beck Dance Troupe at the Edinburgh Festival Fringe.

Lilley has played with a band known as the John Lilley Band.

His solo debut CD Lucky Kinda Guy, which has been described as "a country-tinged, roots-rock journey into Lilley's mind, his life and, most importantly, into his heart", was released in 2009.

== Avantgardeners ==
Lilley founded a landscape gardening company in the Philadelphia area, Avantgardeners.

== Personal life ==
Lilley is gay.
