= Eric Bazilian =

American musician (born 1953)

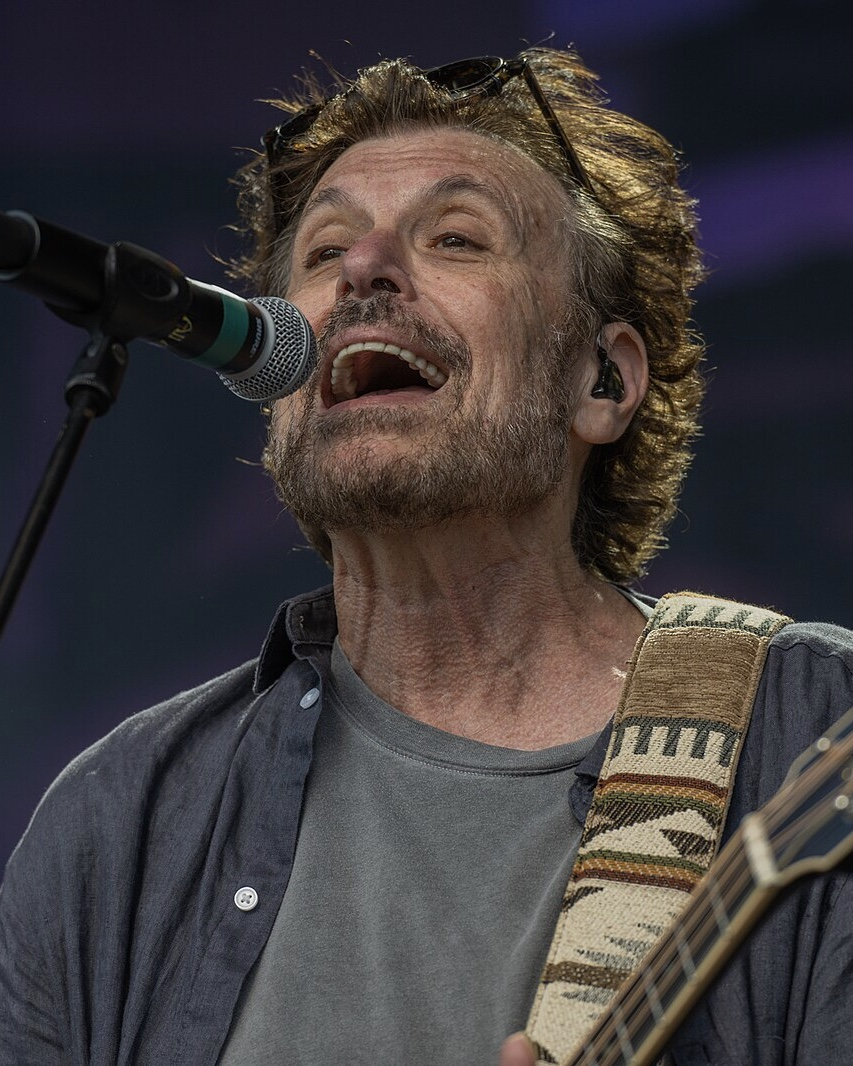
- Eric Bazilian performing at Lieder am See with the Hooters in 2022

Background information
- Born: Eric Michael Bazilian; July 21, 1953 (age 73); Philadelphia, Pennsylvania, U.S.
- Genre: Rock
- Occupations: Musician; songwriter
- Instruments: Vocals; guitar; melodica; harmonica; recorder; saxophone; mandolin; keyboards; bass; drums
- Years active: 1978–present
- Member of: The Hooters
- Spouse: Sarah Bazilian (m. 1995)
- Website: ericbazilian.com

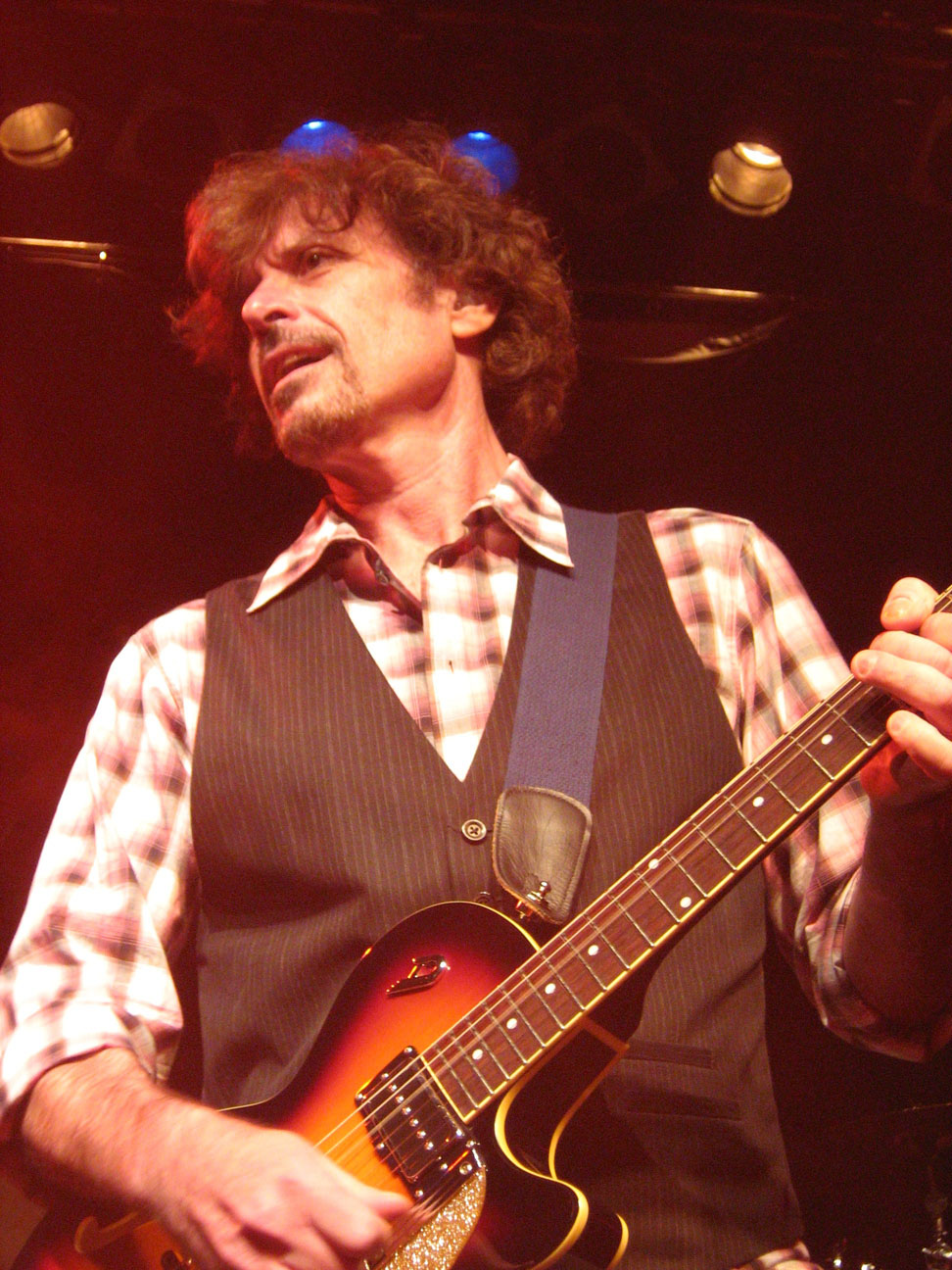
Bazilian performing in 2008

Eric Michael Bazilian (born July 21, 1953) is an American singer, songwriter, multi-instrumentalist, arranger, and producer. Bazilian is a founding member of the rock band the Hooters. He wrote "One of Us", a song first recorded by Joan Osborne in 1995.

== Early life and education ==
Eric Bazilian was born on July 21, 1953, at the Hospital of the University of Pennsylvania in Philadelphia to Stanford Bazilian, a psychiatrist, and Barbara Bazilian, a concert pianist. He is Jewish. Bazilian graduated from Germantown Friends School and studied physics at the University of Pennsylvania.

== Career ==
=== The Hooters ===
In college, Bazilian met Rob Hyman. Together, they formed The Hooters in 1980. Bazilian sings and plays guitar, mandolin, recorder, harmonica, and saxophone in the band.

In 1983, The Hooters began working on their first album. The result, Amore, was released on the independent label Antenna and sold over 100,000 copies.

The band's second album, Nervous Night (1985), featured the singles “And We Danced”, “Day by Day”, and “All You Zombies”. The album went platinum and sold more than two million copies in the United States.

The Hooters first gained major commercial success in the United States in the mid-1980s due to heavy radio airplay and MTV rotation of several songs, including "All You Zombies", "Day by Day", "And We Danced" and "Where Do the Children Go". The band played at the Live Aid benefit concert in Philadelphia in 1985. In Europe, the Hooters had success with the singles "All You Zombies" and "Johnny B", but the band's breakthrough across Europe came with the single "Satellite". The band played at The Wall Concert in Berlin in 1990.

On May 11, 2004, The Hooters were presented with a Lifetime Achievement Award from the Philadelphia Music Awards.

=== Other work ===
In 1982, Bazilian was involved in the making of Cyndi Lauper's album She's So Unusual.

In 1995, Bazilian produced and arranged Joan Osborne's major-label debut album Relish. The album was nominated for six Grammy Awards, including Song of the Year for the No. 4 Billboard hit "One of Us," which Bazilian wrote.

In 2011, his song "Lo Mejor De Mi Vida Eres Tú," performed by Ricky Martin and co-written with Claudia Brant, Andreas Carlsson, Desmond Child, and Ricky Martin, was nominated for Song of the Year at the 12th Annual Latin Grammy Awards.

=== Accolades ===
On November 17, 2000, Bazilian was inducted into the Philadelphia Walk of Fame on the Avenue of the Arts.

On April 21, 2004, Bazilian won an ASCAP Film and Television Music Award for "One of Us" as the theme song for the CBS television series Joan of Arcadia.

== Discography ==
=== Solo career ===
- The Optimist (2000)
- A Very Dull Boy (2002)
- What Shall Become of the Baby? (2012) (with Mats Wester, as Bazilian & Wester)
- Bazilian (2021)

== Personal life ==
Bazilian is married to his wife, Sarah, whom he met while traveling to a festival in Sweden.
