= Rob Hyman =

American singer-songwriter (b. 1950)

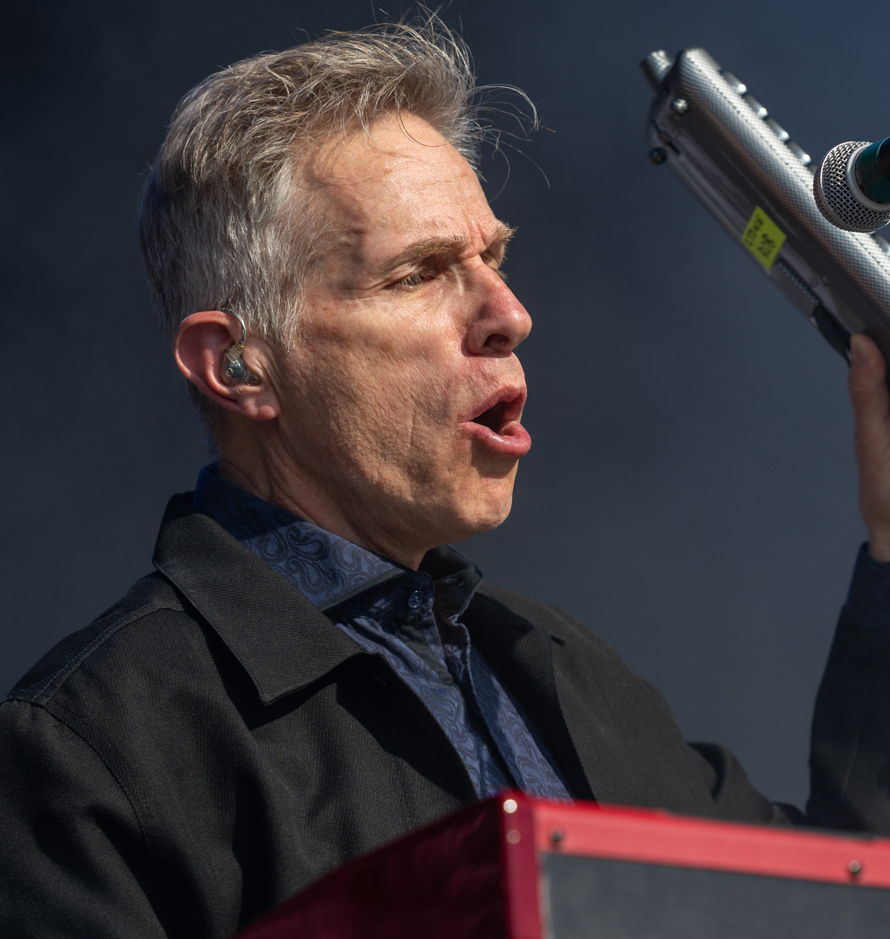
- Hyman performing with the Hooters in 2022

Background information
- Born: Robert Andrew Hyman; April 24, 1950 (age 76); Meriden, Connecticut, U.S.
- Genre: Rock
- Occupations: Musician; songwriter; producer
- Instruments: Vocals; keyboards; melodica; accordion; guitar; mandolin
- Years active: 1978–present
- Member of: The Hooters

Robert Andrew Hyman (born April 24, 1950) is an American singer, songwriter, keyboard and accordion player, producer, arranger, and a founding member of the rock band the Hooters.

== Early life ==
Hyman started taking piano lessons at the age of four and grew up playing in local bands in Meriden, Connecticut, including The Trolls and the Pro-Teens.

While attending the University of Pennsylvania in Philadelphia, where he earned a Bachelor of Science degree in biology, Hyman met future bandmate and composing partner Eric Bazilian and producer Rick Chertoff. In the late 1960s, Hyman and Chertoff, along with local singer David Kagan formed a band called Wax, who recorded an album in the early 1970s. They also released two albums under the group name of Baby Grand in the mid-1970s with Chertoff as the producer.

== The Hooters ==
Hyman and Eric Bazilian formed The Hooters in 1980. The band played its first show on July 4 of that year. They took the band's name from a nickname for the melodica, a type of keyboard harmonica. The Hooters first gained major commercial success in the United States in the mid-1980s due to heavy radio airplay and MTV rotation of several songs, including "All You Zombies", "Day by Day", "And We Danced" and "Where Do the Children Go".

The band played at the Live Aid benefit concert in Philadelphia in 1985, at A Conspiracy of Hope, a benefit concert on behalf of Amnesty International, at Giants Stadium in East Rutherford, New Jersey, and at The Wall Concert in Berlin in 1990.

In 1995, The Hooters went on hiatus, although Hyman and Bazilian would continue to collaborate on musical projects for other artists. Hyman reunited with The Hooters on headlining European summer tours in 2003, 2004 and 2005.

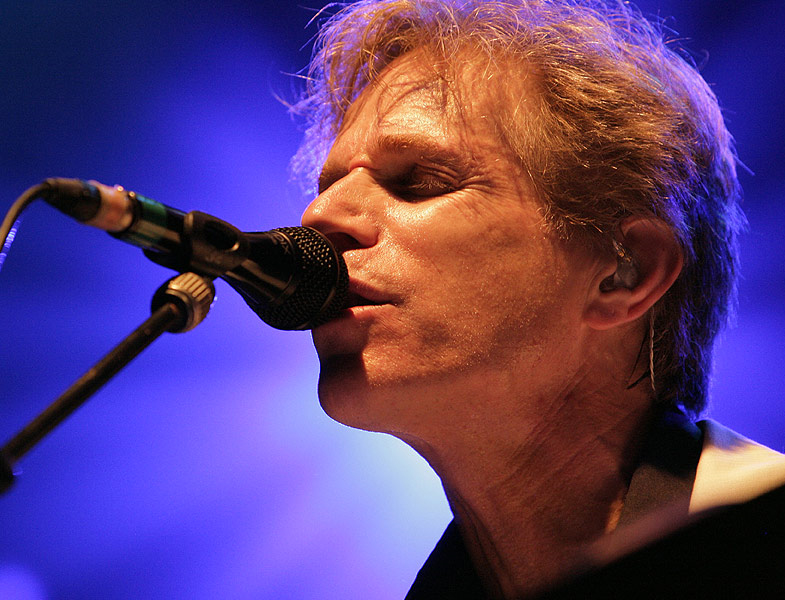
Hyman performing in Germany in 2007

On May 11, 2004, The Hooters were presented with a Lifetime Achievement Award from the Philadelphia Music Awards.

== Other musical projects ==
In 1983, Hyman and Cyndi Lauper wrote and sang the Billboard number one hit "Time After Time," which earned him a Grammy Award nomination for Song of the Year in 1985. Hyman has collaborated with Dar Williams on The Beauty of the Rain and My Better Self (2002 and 2005), and with Bette Midler.

== Recognition ==
On November 17, 2000, Hyman was inducted into the Philadelphia Walk of Fame on the Avenue of the Arts.
