= Douglas Carr (record producer) =

Swedish songwriter and record producer (born 1968)

- Born: October 30, 1968 (age 58)
- Origin: Eskilstuna, Sweden
- Occupations: Songwriter, record producer
- Instruments: Keyboards, guitar, bass guitar, drums, vocals
- Years active: 1989–present

Douglas Carr (born 30 October 1968) is a Swedish songwriter, record producer and sound designer. He was one of the key figures in what is commonly referred to as the "Swedish musical wonder" and was part of the original creative core of Cheiron Studios in Stockholm. Together with Denniz Pop, he produced Ace of Base's international hit "The Sign", which reached number one on the US Billboard Hot 100.

Carr is also known for songs such as Meja's "All 'Bout the Money", Dr. Alban's "Sing Hallelujah!" and Leila K's "Open Sesame". During his international career, he has written and produced music for artists including The Corrs and Nick Carter, and collaborated with songwriters such as Diane Warren, Billy Steinberg, Robbie Nevil, Randy Bachman, Randy Goodrum, Michael Garvin and Nik Kershaw.

== Early years and SweMix ==
Carr grew up in Eskilstuna, Sweden.

Around 1990, he moved to Stockholm, where he signed a record deal with Telegram Records and met Klas Lunding and Ola Håkansson. He later began working with Denniz Pop at SweMix. One of their first collaborations was a remix of Dr. Alban's "It's My Life" (1992).

The two went on to co-write and produce Leila K's "Open Sesame" (1992) and Dr. Alban's "Sing Hallelujah!" (1993), both of which became international hits and achieved chart success in several European countries.

== Cheiron Studios ==
Following their time at SweMix, Carr and Denniz Pop continued their collaboration at Cheiron Studios, where they formed the studio's first songwriting and production duo before other songwriters and producers joined.

Carr co-produced Ace of Base's international hit "The Sign" alongside Denniz Pop. The song spent six weeks at number one on the US Billboard Hot 100 and topped Billboard Year-End Hot 100 singles of 1994. It also topped Billboard Hot 100 Airplay.

"The Sign" won the Billboard Music Award for Number One Single. It was nominated for Best Pop Performance by a Duo or Group with Vocals at the 1995 Grammy Awards, and for Favorite Pop/Rock Single at the American Music Awards.

Carr also co-wrote the Ace of Base song "Into the Night of Blue" with Jonas Berggren and Diane Warren.

During the mid-1990s, Carr collaborated with Swedish artist Herbie Crichlow on his album Fingers (1995). At the 1995 Swedish Dance Music Awards, Carr won Best Swedish Remix for his work on Herbie's "Pick It Up". The following year, he received a nomination for Best Swedish Producer.

== Collaboration with Meja ==
Carr began working with Meja in 1995, playing a significant role as a songwriter and producer in shaping her early solo career. Her debut album, Meja (1996), featured "How Crazy Are You?", which he co-wrote with Janne Taneli Junttila. The album became a major success in Japan and sold nearly one million copies worldwide. During this period, he also co-wrote "Rainbow" with Meja and American songwriter Billy Steinberg.

Their collaboration continued on Meja's second album, Seven Sisters (1998), which Carr produced. The album featured "All 'Bout the Money", written by Carr and Meja. The song became an international hit, reaching the top ten in Japan, and was nominated for Song of the Year at the 1999 Swedish Grammis Awards. In 1999, the album received an International Pop Album of the Year award at the Japan Gold Disc Awards. Seven Sisters achieved triple-platinum sales and was also released in the United States.

Carr also worked as a songwriter and producer on Meja's third album, Realitales (2001), alongside internationally established songwriters and producers including Stephen Lipson and Marti Frederiksen.

In 1999, Carr was nominated for Producer of the Year at the Swedish Grammis Awards for his work with Meja and Ace of Base.

== LaCarr and international collaborations ==
In the late 1990s, Carr and Lasse Karlsson founded LaCarr, a recording studio and music production company in Stockholm. In 2000, they began working with Zomba Music Publishing. The studio brought together songwriters and producers including Johan Wetterberg, Vincent Pontare, Michel Zitron, Ulric Johansson, Martin Hedström, Peter Boström and Nick Nice.

During this period, Carr also worked with several American pop acts, including No Secrets, Nikki Cleary and the boy band Natural.

Carr collaborated with Backstreet Boys member Nick Carter on his debut solo album, Now or Never (2002), co-writing and producing "Scandalicious" and co-writing "Payback" with Carter and British songwriter Nik Kershaw.

In 2002, Carr co-wrote "Hot Temptation" with Christian Walz for the German pop group Bro'Sis, which was formed through the television talent show Popstars. The single reached number four on the German singles chart.

Carr also worked as a producer on the Australian pop group Human Nature's self-titled album Human Nature (2000), which reached number seven on the Australian Album Chart and was certified platinum.

== K-otic and the Netherlands ==
In 2001, Carr began working in the Netherlands, where he and Ulric Johansson produced music for Starmaker, a Dutch television talent show in which contestants formed the pop group K-otic.Their single "Damn (I Think I Love You)", originally released under the name Starmaker before the group became known as K-otic, debuted at number one on the Dutch Top 40 and remained there for five weeks.

Following K-otic's success, Carr and Johansson continued working with Dutch singer Sita, who launched a solo career after the group's breakthrough. They contributed as songwriters and producers to her debut album, Happy (2002), with Carr also co-producing the title track, "Happy". The song won two TMF Awards that year, for Best Single and Best Music Video, while Sita was named Best Female Artist.

== Japan ==
Carr continued to enjoy success in Japan, working with artists including Eiko Matsumoto. He produced her debut single, "Namida no Chikara" (1999), as well as most of her debut album, From the First Touch (1999).

His collaborations with Japanese artists also included Caoli Cano and Yasue Sato. For Sato, he co-wrote "Good in You" with American songwriter Robbie Nevil.

== Björn Skifs ==
In 2001, Carr was the principal songwriter and producer for Back on Track, an album by Swedish singer Björn Skifs, best known internationally as the lead singer of Blue Swede on their hit "Hooked on a Feeling".

For the album, Carr collaborated with Bill Champlin from the band Chicago and songwriter Tamara Champlin. Other American musicians who contributed included Toto singer Joseph Williams and Chicago drummer Tris Imboden, who had previously played with Kenny Loggins.

== Other international collaborations ==
In 1995, Carr produced Real McCoy's "Come and Get Your Love" with Per Adebratt, Tommy Ekman and David Brunner. The single reached number 19 on the US Billboard Hot 100 and topped Billboard's dance chart.

The following year, Carr joined Adebratt and Ekman in producing a new version of "The Right Time" by Irish band The Corrs. Released in 1996, the version was created specifically for European radio. The original recording had been produced by David Foster and Jim Corr.

Carr's work with American songwriter Randy Goodrum included "From Here", a song they wrote together that later appeared on Goodrum's album Red Eye (2020).

He also worked with Swedish singer Emilia on her album Emilia (2000), co-writing "Sorry I'm in Love" with Andreas Carlsson and Tamara Champlin, as well as "Kiss by Kiss", which was released as a single in 2001. "Sorry I'm in Love" reached number 17 on the Swedish Singles Chart and was certified gold, while "Kiss by Kiss" charted in Germany and Switzerland..

Other collaborations included Danish singer Maria Montell and Swedish-Greek artist Helena Paparizou, for whom Carr wrote and produced "Let's Get Wild" (2005). He also worked with Faroese singer Linda Andrews, winner of the Danish X Factor. Carr also worked with Swedish group Blue Swede, best known internationally for their 1970s hit "Hooked on a Feeling", as a songwriter and producer, contributing to the group's 2021 album We're Hooked Again.

== Fighting Star ==
In 2013, Carr ventured into musical theatre with Fighting Star, a musical he created alongside Niklas Rosström and American songwriter Sharon Vaughn. The musical had its world premiere at Wasa Teater in Finland on 28 September 2013, directed by Maria Sid.

== Sound design and Teenage Engineering ==
In 2026, Carr began a collaboration with Swedish company Teenage Engineering, creating a sound library for its OP–XY instrument, a combined synthesizer and sequencer. The library contains over 300 sounds intended for songwriting, music production and studio work, ranging from early samplers to sophisticated high-end recordings and sound processing. The sound library, titled DC Pack, was launched in October 2026 with a personal showcase at the Teenage Engineering Department Store in Manhattan, New York City.

== Industry roles ==
Carr has also held positions of responsibility within the Swedish music industry. He served on the board of SKAP, the Swedish association for songwriters, composers and lyricists, from 2004 to 2022, and on the board of STIM, Sweden's music copyright and royalty collection society, from 2006 to 2022.

He has also served on the Polar Music Prize Award Committee since 2013, which selects the recipients of the international music award.

== Selected songwriting and production credits ==
Artist	Song
Leila K	"Open Sesame" (1992)
Dr. Alban	"Sing Hallelujah!" (1993)
Leila K	"Ça plane pour moi" (1993)
Ace of Base	"The Sign" (1993)
Dr. Alban	"This Time I'm Free" (1995)
Real McCoy	"Come and Get Your Love" (1995)
Meja	"How Crazy Are You?" (1996)
Meja	"All 'Bout the Money" (1998)
K-otic	"Damn (I Think I Love You)" (2001)
Björn Skifs	"Like It Was Nothing at All" (2001)
Emilia	"Kiss by Kiss" (2001)
Sita	"Happy" (2002)
No Secrets	"Here I Am" (2002)
Nick Carter	"Payback" (2002)
Nick Carter	"Scandalicious" (2002)
Bro'Sis	"Hot Temptation" (2002)
Nikki Cleary	"Fish Out of Water" (2003)
Helena Paparizou	"Let's Get Wild" (2005)
Randy Goodrum	"From Here" (2020)
The LAB Inc. feat. Linda Andrews	"Feelgood Party" (2022)
The LAB Inc. feat. Linda Andrews	"Changes" (2023)
