= Private Emotion =

1993 single by the Hooters

Single by the Hooters

from the album Out of Body
- B-side: "Heimliche Sehnsucht"; "All Around the Place"
- Released: 1993
- Length: 3:58
- Label: MCA
- Songwriters: Rob Hyman; Eric Bazilian
- Producers: Eric Bazilian; Joe Hardy; Rob Hyman

The Hooters singles chronology
"Boys Will Be Boys" (1993)	"Private Emotion" (1993)	"Satellite '95" (1995)

"Private Emotion" is a song recorded by American band the Hooters for their fifth studio album, Out of Body (1993). The song was written by Eric Bazilian and Rob Hyman, while the production was handled by Bazilian, Joe Hardy, and Hyman. It was released by MCA Records as the third single from the album in 1993. A ballad, using mandolin and Hammond organ, it is a love song that expresses a fresh emotion through an extreme desire to share love. The song received widely positive reviews from music critics, who complimented its use of instruments and Bazilian's vocal. A German-language version of the song, entitled "Heimliche Sehnsucht" (transl. "Secret Longing") was released in Germany in 1994.

"Private Emotion" was covered by Puerto Rican singer Ricky Martin, featuring a guest appearance from Swedish singer Meja for Martin's fifth studio album and English-language debut, Ricky Martin (1999). The song was released by Columbia Records as the fourth single from the album on February 8, 2000. A world music and pop power ballad, its production was handled by Desmond Child. The song received widely positive reviews from music critics, who complimented the singers' vocals. The cover version was commercially successful, reaching number one in Czech Republic and Mexico, as well as the top 10 in Sweden, Switzerland, the United Kingdom, and several other countries. It was also certified gold in Sweden. To promote the song, Martin and Meja performed it at the 2000 ECHO Awards. The accompanying music video was directed by Francis Lawrence and features Aurélie Claudel. It shows Martin and a woman being frozen in a frozen hotel room that slowly starts to unfreeze, with water spraying backwards. Then the room goes on fire, while Martin and the woman fall in love ending up in the flames.

== Background and composition ==
"Private Emotion"
A 24-second sample of the chorus

"Private Emotion" was written by Eric Bazilian and Rob Hyman for the Hooters' fifth studio album Out of Body (1993). During an interview with The News Journal, Bazilian told the newspaper about the song's lyrics: "Rob and I wrote that lyric together. We never talked about what it really means. It's sort of vague, but I think everybody will get it. It's a personal song that can be personal for everyone." He explained to The Philadelphia Inquirer that they knew "the magic was returning" when he got the idea of the song:

It was all the traditional songwriting cliches. There was thunder, pouring rain outside, and in about 15 minutes this little gem of a song came out. It doesn't happen often that you get the whole thing. I was like, 'Thank you, I believe.'

Musically, "Private Emotion" is a ballad that uses mandolin and Hammond organ. The song runs for a total of 3 minutes and 58 seconds, and its production was handled by Bazilian, Joe Hardy, and Hyman. Lyrically, "Private Emotion" is a love song that "expresses raw emotion through a driving desire to share love", with lyrics, including: "It's a private emotion that fills you tonight / And a silence falls between us / As the shadows steal the light / And wherever you may find it / Wherever it may lead / Let your private emotion come to me".

== Promotion and reception ==
MCA Records released "Private Emotion" on CD in 1993 as the third single from Out of Body in Europe. The European standard maxi single includes both original and live versions of "Private Emotion", as well as "All Around the Place". In the United States, "Private Emotion" was released as a Promotional CD single in the same year. A German-language version of the song, entitled "Heimliche Sehnsucht" (transl. "Secret Longing") was launched on CD in Germany in 1994. It contains two versions of "Heimliche Sehnsucht" and "Great Big American Car".

Upon release, "Private Emotion" was met with widely positive reviews from music critics. In a review of Out of Body, Jonathan Takiff of The Record described the song's use of instruments as rich and labeled the track "one of the finest ballads the band has ever recorded". Patrick Davitt of The Leader-Post praised "Bazilian's "Windwood-ish lead vocal [and] light mandolin accompaniment" for giving the song "emotional weight". He also noted the lyric "uses light and shadow to evoke love and distance". Jerry Kishbaugh of The Citizens' Voice gave "Private Emotion" a positive review, naming it "one of the album's strongest efforts" and "one of the best ballads" he had heard in years. He continued praising it, saying "if released, this one is sure to be a mega-hit". An author of SouthtownStar noted the song's "gentle love melancholy", while The Courier-Journal critic applauded Bazilian's "stirring vocal".

== Formats and track listings ==
- European CD maxi-single
1. "Private Emotion" - 3:58
2. "Private Emotion" (Live) - 4:15
3. "All Around the Place" - 3:45
- German CD
1. "Heimliche Sehnsucht" (Version 1) - 4:00
2. "Great Big American Car" - 5:16
3. "Heimliche Sehnsucht" (Version 2) - 3:50
- US promotional CD
1. "Private Emotion" (Album Version) - 3:58

== Credits and personnel ==
Credits are adapted from the European maxi-CD single liner notes.

- Eric Bazilian – lead vocals, composer, lyricist, producer, engineer, mandolin, guitar, fretless bass
- Rob Hyman – producer, composer, lyricist, engineer, synth, organ
- Mindy Jostyn – vocals
- David Uosikkinen – drums
- Joe Hardy – producer, engineer, mixing
- Erik Flettrich – assistant engineer
- George Marino – mastering
- Peter Urban – producer on live version of "Private Emotion"
- Johannes Carstens – sound engineer on live version of "Private Emotion"

== Ricky Martin version ==
"Private Emotion"

Single by Ricky Martin featuring Meja

from the album Ricky Martin
- Released: February 8, 2000
- Recorded: 1998
- Genre: World; pop
- Length: 4:01
- Label: C2; Columbia
- Songwriters: Eric Bazilian; Robert Hyman
- Producer: Desmond Child

Ricky Martin singles chronology
"Shake Your Bon-Bon" (1999)	"Private Emotion" (2000)	"She Bangs" (2000)

Meja singles chronology
"Intimacy" (1999)	"Private Emotion" (2000)	"Spirits" (2000)

Music video
- "Private Emotion" on YouTube

=== Background and release ===
In 1998, Ricky Martin released his fourth studio album Vuelve. The album experienced commercial success, spending 26 weeks atop the US Billboard Top Latin Albums chart. "La Copa de la Vida" was released as the second single from the album, and became the official song of the 1998 FIFA World Cup in France. The song topped the charts in more than 30 countries, and Martin performed it at the 41st Annual Grammy Awards, which was greeted with a massive standing ovation and met with acclaim from music critics. On October 22, 1998, CNN confirmed that Martin had started working on his first English language album, following the huge success of Vuelve. On March 6, 1999, almost two weeks after his Grammy performance, it was announced that the album, which was still untitled, had been set for release in May. "Livin' la Vida Loca" was released on March 23, 1999, as the lead single from the album. The song topped the charts in more than 20 countries and is considered to be Martin's biggest hit, and one of the best-selling singles of all time.

On April 24, 1999, Billboard revealed the album's title as Ricky Martin in an article, mentioning that it was initially set for retail on May 25, 1999. However, the huge interest in the disc encouraged Columbia Records to decide to rush the album to release two weeks ahead of schedule, on May 11. Ricky Martin was released on the specified date and a cover version of "Private Emotion", featuring Swedish singer Meja, was included as the eighth track on the album. Martin recorded "Private Emotion" at the suggestion of producer Desmond Child. Bazilian told Popdose that he had been "good friends" with Child and he had played "a bunch of Hooters stuff" for him and Child "really liked 'Private Emotion'". Therefore, although Bazilian wanted "a track for Robbie Williams to sing", Williams and Child's relationship was not good, so "that went by the wayside". Six months later, Child told him he was recording a project with Martin and "thought it would be a great song for him" and Bazilian agreed: "Hey, go ahead!"

Columbia Records and C2 Records released "Private Emotion" on CD on February 8, 2000, as the fourth single from the album. The European single includes "Livin' la Vida Loca" and a remix of "La Bomba", along with "Private Emotion". In Japan, the single was launched by Epic Records on March 29, 2000, and the set contains "Private Emotion", a live version of "Livin' la Vida Loca", and "Almost a Love Song". The last one was also featured in the Australian edition and is an English version of Martin's song "Casi un Bolero", taken from Vuelve. In the Asian / Middle Eastern edition of Ricky Martin, "Private Emotion" features Turkish singer Sertab Erener instead of Meja. The original song was later added to Martin's compilation albums The Best of Ricky Martin (2001), Greatest Hits (2011), and Greatest Hits: Souvenir Edition (2013).

=== Music and lyrics ===
"Private Emotion"
A 24-second sample of the chorus, which blends both Martin and Meja's voices.

Musically, "Private Emotion" is a world music and pop power ballad. The track runs for a total of four minutes and one second, and its production was handled by Child. According to the song's sheet music on Musicnotes.com, "Private Emotion" is composed in the key of G♯ major with a groove of 76 beats per minute. Similar to the original version, Martin's cover of "Private Emotion" is a love song that "expresses raw emotion through a driving desire to share love".

=== Critical reception ===
"Private Emotion" has been met with widely positive reviews from music critics. Billboard staff gave the song a positive review, saying it is Martin's "most thought-provoking release in English to date". They called it a "lovely ballad" and praised Martin's vocals that are "more grittier and more textured than in past releases", while Meja "adds a dreamy layer of vulnerability and sweetness". They also stated that the track boosts "Martin's credibility as a singer" and surprises "the public with how different" he "sounds this time around". Also from Billboard, Leila Cobo ranked "Private Emotion" as the Ricky Martin's fifth-best track, naming it the "under-appreciated jewel" of the album, saying: "The harmonies in this gorgeous ballad highlight new depth in Martin's vocals and emotional interpretation."

Writing for The Indianapolis Star, David Lindquist praised it for Martin's "true vocal skills" and expressed although "Private Emotion" is not "the best ballad ever written, but Martin's tight harmony with a female co-vocalist relayed an understated genius". Another The Indianapolis Star reviewer Diana Penner labeled it "a decent tortured power-ballad", while an author of SouthtownStar described it as "a stirring duet". Carlos Mario Castro from El Sabanero X named "Private Emotion" Martin's second-best song, observing it to be a "very well done cover". Claudia González Alvarado from Chilango ranked it as Martin's tenth-best ballad in 2021, calling it "a nice fusion of vocals and the emotionality required for the lyrics".

=== Commercial performance ===
"Private Emotion" is one of Martin's best known songs in his career. In the United States, the single debuted at number 76 on the Billboard Hot 100 on March 11, 2000, becoming Martin's sixth entry and Meja's first and only entry to date. The following week it climbed to its peak at number 67. The track also reached the top 40 on Billboard's Adult Contemporary, Mainstream Top 40, and Top 40 Tracks charts. Besides the United States, the single topped the international music chart in Mexico. In the United Kingdom, "Private Emotion" debuted and peaked at number nine on the chart issue dated April 23, 2000. In Sweden, the track peaked at number eight and was certified gold by the Grammofonleverantörernas förening (GLF), denoting sales of over 15,000 copies in the country. The song also reached number one in Czech Republic, as well as the top 10 in Finland, Norway, Scotland, and Switzerland, and the top 15 in Europe, France, Ireland, Italy, and New Zealand. The Erener featured version became a hit single in Asia and the Middle East.

=== Promotion ===
==== Music video ====
A screenshot from the music video, depicting Martin and Aurélie Claudel in the flames.

The accompanying music video was directed by Francis Lawrence and aired in March 2000. The visual features the French model and actress Aurélie Claudel. It begins with a frozen Martin and a mystery woman, portrayed by Claudel, in a frozen bedroom in a hotel. Throughout the video, the events slowly go in reverse as the room starts to unfreeze, with water spraying backwards. Then the room goes on fire, while Martin and the woman fall in love ending up in the flames, and then the room goes back to normal and the woman leaves. Carlos Mario Castro from El Sabanero X labeled the video "quite an interesting creative piece", while Cristal Mesa from mitú ranked it as Martin's 11th-best music video on her 2018 list, and described it as "a head scratcher".

==== Live performances ====
"Private Emotion" was included on the set lists for Martin's the Livin' la Vida Loca Tour, the Ricky Martin Live tour, and the All In residency. Martin and Meja performed the song together at the 9th Annual ECHO Awards on March 9, 2000.

=== Formats and track listings ===
- Australian CD maxi-single
1. "Private Emotion" – 4:01
2. "Livin' la Vida Loca" (Opening Performance) – 4:32
3. "She's All I Ever Had" (Live - Video) – 3:34
4. "Almost a Love Song" ("Casi un Bolero") – 4:40
- European CD single
1. "Private Emotion" – 4:01
2. "Ricky Martin - DMC Mega Mix Edit" – 7:33
- European CD maxi-single
1. "Private Emotion" – 4:01
2. "Livin' la Vida Loca" (Live - Video [Opening Performance]) – 4:32
3. "She's All I Ever Had" (Live - Video) – 3:34
- French CD maxi-single
1. "Private Emotion" – 4:00
2. "Marcia Baila" – 3:58
3. "Livin' la Vida Loca" (Live - Video) (Opening Performance) – 4:32
4. "She's All I Ever Had" (Live - Video) – 3:34
- Japanese CD maxi-single
1. "Private Emotion" – 4:01
2. "Livin' la Vida Loca" (Live Audio from One Night Only) – 4:39
3. "Almost a Love Song" ("Casi un Bolero") – 4:39
- UK CD maxi-single
1. "Private Emotion" – 4:01
2. "La Bomba" (Remix - Long Version) – 9:43
3. "Livin' la Vida Loca" (Album Version) – 4:03

=== Credits and personnel ===
Credits adapted from Tidal.

- Ricky Martin – vocal, associated performer
- Meja – vocal, featured artist, associated performer
- Desmond Child – producer, executive producer
- Eric Bazilian – composer, lyricist, guitar, mandolin
- Rob Hyman – composer, lyricist, organ
- David Campbell – arranger, conductor
- Robert Valdez – assistant engineer
- Craig Lozowick – assistant engineer, recording engineer
- German Ortiz – assistant engineer
- Nathan Malki – assistant engineer, recording engineer
- Gyan – background vocal
- Hugh McDonald – bass
- Suzie Katayama – cello
- Larry Corbett – cello
- Iris Aponte – coordinator
- Brian Coleman – coordinator
- Robi Draco Rosa – co-producer
- Lee Levin – drums
- Charles Dye – mixing engineer, recording engineer
- Luis Enrique – percussion
- Jules Gondar – recording engineer
- Rik Pekkonen – recording engineer
- John Scanlon – viola
- Denyse Buffum – viola
- Joel Derouin – violin
- Michele Richards – violin
- Eve Butler – violin

=== Charts ===
==== Weekly charts ====
Weekly peak performance for "Private Emotion"
Chart (2000)	Peak position
Australia (ARIA)	59
Austria (Ö3 Austria Top 40)	19
Belgium (Ultratop 50 Flanders)	30
Belgium (Ultratop 50 Wallonia)	18
Canada Adult Contemporary (RPM)	17
Croatia International (HRT)	2
Czech Republic (IFPI)	1
European Hot 100 Singles (Billboard)	11
Finland (Suomen virallinen lista)	6
France (SNEP)	11
Germany (GfK)	21
Iceland (Íslenski Listinn Topp 40)	30
Ireland (IRMA)	14
Italy (FIMI)	13
Netherlands (Dutch Top 40)	29
Netherlands (Single Top 100)	29
Mexico International (Notimex)	1
New Zealand (Recorded Music NZ)	12
Norway (VG-lista)	7
Scottish Singles Sales (Official Charts)	6
Spain (Top 40 Radio)	25
Sweden (Sverigetopplistan)	8
Switzerland (Schweizer Hitparade)	9
UK Singles (Official Charts)	9
US Billboard Hot 100	67
US Adult Contemporary (Billboard)	21
US Pop Airplay (Billboard)	32
US Top 40 Tracks (Billboard)	40

==== Year-end charts ====
2000 year-end chart performance for "Private Emotion"
Chart (2000)	Position
Belgium (Ultratop 50 Wallonia)	70
Europe (European Hot 100 Singles)	57
Norway Russefeiring Period (VG-lista)	20
Sweden (Hitlistan)	89
Switzerland (Schweizer Hitparade)	41
UK Singles (OCC)	150
US Adult Contemporary (Billboard)	45

=== Certifications ===
Certifications and sales for "Private Emotion"
Region	Certification	Certified units/sales
Sweden (GLF)	Gold	15,000^{^}
^{^} Shipments figures based on certification alone.

=== Release history ===
Release dates and formats for "Private Emotion"
Region	Date	Format(s)	Label	Ref.
Europe	February 8, 2000	CD single	Columbia Records	
Japan	March 29, 2000	CD single	Epic Records	

== See also ==
- 2000 in music
- Popular music in Sweden
- List of UK top-ten singles in 2000
