= The Hooters Live =

Live album by the Hooters
- Released: May 9, 1994
- Recorded: December 2–3, 1993; February 1994 (studio tracks only)
- Venue: Biskuithalle, Bonn; Hyde Park, Osnabrück
- Studio: The Ranch, Philadelphia (studio tracks only)
- Genre: Rock
- Length: 67:45
- Label: MCA
- Producer: Eric Bazilian; Rob Hyman; Rick Chertoff

The Hooters chronology
Out of Body (1993)	The Hooters Live (1994)	Hooterization: A Retrospective (1996)

The Hooters Live is the first live album by American rock band the Hooters released in 1994 by MCA Records. It contains eleven tracks recorded live in Germany and two newly recorded studio tracks.

== Background ==
The Hooters Live was recorded on December 2, 1993 at Biskuithalle in Bonn, Germany and December 3, 1993 at Hyde Park in Osnabrück, Germany. There were two cover versions of Bob Dylan songs ("All I Really Want to Do" and "Blowin' in the Wind") recorded at the band's home studio The Ranch in Philadelphia, Pennsylvania in February 1994.

== Track listing ==
No.	Title	Writer(s)	Length
1.	"Dancing on the Edge"	Rob Hyman, Eric Bazilian, John Bettis	4:22
2.	"Boys Will Be Boys"	Hyman, Bazilian, Cyndi Lauper	4:58
3.	"Karla with a K"	The Hooters	6:21
4.	"And We Danced"	Hyman, Bazilian	5:21
5.	"Deliver Me"	Hyman, Bazilian	5:55
6.	"Graveyard Waltz"	Hyman, Bazilian, Rick Chertoff	2:57
7.	"500 Miles"	Hedy West; additional lyrics by Hyman, Bazilian, Chertoff	8:46
8.	"Twenty Five Hours a Day"	Hyman, Bazilian, Jerry Williams	9:48
9.	"Jigs 'N' Reels" / "Satellite"	Traditional; arranged by Fairport Convention / Hyman, Bazilian, Chertoff	7:51
10.	"Johnny B."	Hyman, Bazilian, Chertoff	8:26
11.	"Day by Day"	Hyman, Bazilian, Chertoff	4:20
12.	"All I Really Want to Do" (studio)	Bob Dylan	3:58
13.	"Blowin' in the Wind" (studio)	Dylan	4:37

== Personnel ==
Adapted from the album liner notes.

The Hooters

- Eric Bazilian – lead vocals, lead guitar, mandolin, recorder
- Rob Hyman – lead vocals, keyboards, accordion
- David Uosikkinen – drums
- John Lilley – rhythm guitar, acoustic guitar, mandolin, keyboards, guitar solo on "Johnny B"
- Fran Smith Jr. – bass, vocals
- Mindy Jostyn – violin, harmonica, mandolin, vocals

Technical

- Eric Bazilian – producer (all tracks), package design, layout
- Rob Hyman – producer (all tracks)
- Rick Chertoff – producer (studio tracks only)
- Cedric Beatty – engineer (live tracks only)
- Norbert Gutzmann – second engineer (live tracks only)
- Stewart Lerman – engineer (studio tracks only)
- William Wittman – mixing (at Studio 4, Philadelphia)
- Dirk Grobelny – mixing assistant
- George Marino – mastering (at Sterling Sound, NYC)
- Stefan Wildhirt – band photography
- Charles Grumbling – art production guru
