= En sang om kærlighed =

Single by Tue West
- Released: 2003

En sang om kærlighed is a song written and recorded by Tue West, who recorded it and released it as a single in 2003.

== Emilia Rydberg recording ==
Pär Lönn and Emilia Rydberg wrote lyrics in Swedish as "En sång om kärleken". With these lyrics, the song was recorded by Emilia Rydberg on her 2007 album Små ord av kärlek. The same year, the single was released in Sweden. Emilia Rydberg also performed the song at Bingolotto on 22 April 2007.

== Track listing ==
1. En sång om kärleken (radio edit)
2. En sång om kärleken (instrumental version)
3. Var minut ("Hvert minut") (album version)

=== Chart position ===
Chart (2007)	Peak position
Sweden (Sverigetopplistan)	14
