= Twist of Fate (Emilia Rydberg song) =

Single by Emilia Rydberg

from the album Big Big World
- A-side: "Twist of Fate"
- B-side: "Twist of Fate" (navigator remix, radio version)
- Released: 1999 (Sweden); 30 November 1999 (Italy)
- Label: Universal
- Songwriter(s): Lasse "Yogi" Anderson, Emilia Rydberg
- Producer(s): Lasse "Yogi" Anderson, Hurb

Emilia Rydberg singles chronology
| "Good Sign" (1998) | "Twist of Fate" (1999) | "Sorry I'm in Love" (2000) |

Twist of Fate is a song written by Lasse "Yogi" Anderson and Emilia Rydberg, and recorded by Emilia Rydberg on her 1998 album Big Big World.

== Track listing ==
CD-single (Rodeo UMD-87221 (UMG) / EAN 0602508722127)

1. Twist of Fate (ballad version) – 3.44
2. Twist of Fate (navigatorremix, radio edit) – 3.24

Maxisingle (Universal)

1. Twist of Fate (K-Klass Radio Mix) - 3:43
2. Twist of Fate (Album Version) - 3:02
3. Twist of Fate (Pierre J's Good 12") - 5:33
4. Twist of Fate (K-Klass Bunker Dub) - 6:24

== Charts ==
| Chart (1999) | Peak position |
|---|---|
| Sweden (Sverigetopplistan) | 37 |
