= Happy (Legacy of Sound song) =

Single by Legacy of Sound featuring Meja

from the album Holy Groove
- Released: 1993
- Genre: Garage house
- Length: 4:03 (radio mix); 4:18 (club edit)
- Label: Ariola; BMG; RCA
- Songwriters: Anders Bagge; Meja
- Producers: Bag and Snowman

Meja singles chronology
"Happy" (1993)	"All 'Bout the Money" (1998)

Music video
- "Happy" on YouTube

"Happy" is a song by Swedish band Legacy of Sound featuring Swedish singer-songwriter Meja, released in 1993 by Ariola, BMG and RCA as the first single from their debut album, Holy Groove (1993). The song was written by Meja with Anders Bagge and released in 20 countries. In their native Sweden, it reached number 18 on the Swedish Singles Chart, spending five weeks on the chart. It became a surprise hit in the US, peaking at seven and 20 on the Billboard Maxi-Singles Sales and Hot Dance Club Play charts. On the Billboard Mainstream Top 40 and Hot 100 charts, the song reached numbers 29 and 68, spending 12 weeks within the Hot 100.

== Critical reception ==
Larry Flick of Billboard magazine wrote of the song: "Wildly infectious hi-NRG/house music confection is delivered with lots of charisma and diva charm by lead singer Meja. Producer/writers Bag & Snowman have concocted a sing-along chorus that embeds the brain upon impact, and melts it into a white-hot arrangement of rolling piano lines, and butt-shaking beat breaks. Although story will begin at club level, this record has summer pop radio smash written all over it. It gleefully brings you back to the days of platform pumps and disco togs. Have a nice trip."

== Track listing ==
- 12", Sweden (1993)

A1. "Happy" (Club Mix) — 7:47
A2. "Happy" (Happy Radio Mix) — 4:02
B1. "Happy" (After Hour Mix) — 4:51
B2. "Happy" (Nice & Stoned Dub) — 5:36
B3. "Happy" (Club Edit) — 4:18

- 12", US (1993)

A1. "Happy" (Full Vocal Gypsy Mix) — 6:44
A2. "Happy" (Garage Mix) — 6:35
A3. "Happy" (Instrumental) — 6:41
B1. "Happy" (Original Mix) — 7:48
B2. "Happy" (Radio Version) — 4:02

- CD single, Europe (1993)
1. "Happy" (Radio Mix) — 4:02
2. "Happy" (Club Edit) — 4:18

== Charts ==
=== Weekly charts ===
Chart (1993)	Peak position
Canada Dance/Urban (RPM)	3
Quebec (ADISQ)	21
Sweden (Sverigetopplistan)	18
US Billboard Hot 100	68
US Hot Dance Club Play (Billboard)	20
US Mainstream Top 40 (Billboard)	29
US Maxi-Singles Sales (Billboard)	7
US Cash Box Top 100	63

=== Year-end charts ===
Chart (1993)	Position
Canada Dance/Urban (RPM)	10
