= Good Sign =

Single by Emilia Rydberg

from the album Big Big World
- A-side: "Good Sign"
- B-side: "Good Sign" (R&B remix)
- Released: December 7, 1998 (Sweden); February 22, 1999 (Italy)
- Label: Universal
- Songwriters: Lasse "Yogi" Anderson, Emilia Rydberg
- Producers: Lasse "Yogi" Anderson, Hurb

Emilia Rydberg singles chronology
"Big Big World" (1998)	"Good Sign" (1998)	"Twist of Fate" (1999)

Music video
- "Good Sign" on YouTube

Good Sign is a song written by Lasse "Yogi" Anderson and Swedish singer Emilia Rydberg, and recorded by Emilia on her 1998 album Big Big World. The single was released on 7 December 1998 as the follow-up to her very successful debut-single "Big Big World". It peaked at number 16 in Sweden. Additionally it was a top 30 hit in Belgium, France and Switzerland and a top 40 hit in Austria. In the UK, "Good Sign" peaked at number 54.

== Critical reception ==
AllMusic editor Roxanne Blanford described the song as a "uptempo celebration of life, delivered with sincerity and an engagingly happy sing-along chorus." The Daily Vault's Christopher Thelen wrote that Emilia's vocals on "Good Sign" are "powerful without being overbearing", adding that a "solid beat (even though a lot of it is synthesized), matched with some well-placed Vocoder lyrics is evidence enough that Emilia has a reasonable shot at stardom." Chuck Campbell from Knoxville News Sentinel said that the singer offers "an uplifting bit of reggae-tinged light R&B". Larry Printz from The Morning Call declared it as "Swedish pop in the ABBA/Ace of Base tradition."

== Track listing ==
- CD single
1. "Good Sign" (album version)
2. "Good Sign" (R & B-remix)
- Maxi single (Universal 087 206-2)
1. "Good Sign" (K-Klass Radio Mix) - 3:43
2. "Good Sign" (Album Version) - 3:02
3. "Good Sign" (Pierre J's Good 12") - 5:33
4. "Good Sign" (K-Klass Bunker Dub) - 6:24

== Charts ==
Weekly chart performance for "Good Sign"
Chart (1998–1999)	Peak position
Australia (ARIA)	182
Austria (Ö3 Austria Top 40)	34
Belgium (Ultratop 50 Flanders)	44
Belgium (Ultratop 50 Wallonia)	28
Finland (Suomen virallinen lista)	15
France (SNEP)	21
Germany (GfK)	34
Scotland Singles (OCC)	46
Sweden (Sverigetopplistan)	16
Switzerland (Schweizer Hitparade)	27
UK Singles (OCC)	54

Annual chart rankings for "Good Sign"
Chart (1999)	Rank
Europe Border Breakers (Radio Top 50)	93
Europe Border Breakers (Music & Media)	9
