= Blue Stories =

Studio album by Mindy Jostyn
- Released: 2002
- Length: 57:30
- Label: Prime CD

Mindy Jostyn chronology
In His Eyes (1998)	Blue Stories (2002)	Coming Home (2005)

Blue Stories is the fourth studio album from American singer and multi-instrumentalist Mindy Jostyn, released by Prime CD in 2002.

== Background ==
Jostyn described Blue Stories as "an album of songs about people and their plights", adding that "I've tried to treat these people compassionately. I'd prefer the CD not be an experience in darkness - rather, one in a semi-pale shade of blue. Twilight blue, say, with a smattering of stars." Both "Don't Turn Away" and "East of Eden" feature Carly Simon on backing vocals, synth and percussion. The album also includes a cover of Simon's 1971 hit "That's the Way I've Always Heard It Should Be", which features lyrics by Jacob Brackman, whom Jostyn later married. Jostyn described the song as a "despairing view of marriage". "Rock City Road" features harmonica which Jostyn considered to be "train-style harmonica a la Sonny Terry".

== Critical reception ==
Scott Alarik of The Boston Globe described Blue Stories as "a soft thrill of a CD". He added: "In a voice sparkling with wit and personality, Jostyn sings songs of loss and healing, all delivered with the eloquence that made her a favorite accompanist for Carly Simon, Billy Joel and John Mellencamp. Seth Rogovoy of The Berkshire Eagle wrote: "The album's folk-pop tunes have a strong Anglo-Irish folk influence, and the music veers towards barrel-house jazz on 'Empathetic Woman'."

Jay Miller of The Patriot Ledger praised Jostyn's lyrics on the album, which he found to be "witty commentary, incisive self-examination and moving depictions of the simple truths in life". C. Michael Bailey of All About Jazz described Blue Stories as "an exceptional solution of folk, blues, Dixieland, pop, rock, Celtic and country, all simmering into a truly distinctive sound".

== Track listing ==
All tracks are written by Mindy Jostyn and Jacob Brackman except where noted.

No.	Title	Writer(s)	Length
1.	"Till We Meet Again (First Verse)"	Raymond B. Egan, Richard A. Whiting	0:23
2.	"History of Dreams"		3:11
3.	"Sam's Back with Sadie Again"		3:08
4.	"Don't Turn Away"		4:19
5.	"City of Blue Stories"		5:18
6.	"East of Eden"		3:37
7.	"Eden Reel"		1:13
8.	"Empathetic Woman"		4:51
9.	"Letter in the Rain"		4:00
10.	"Till We Meet Again (Second Verse)"	Egan, Whiting	0:33
11.	"The Last to Know"		4:51
12.	"Loner"		6:13
13.	"Guess I'll Go Back Home This Summer"	Willard Robison, Ray Mayer	3:56
14.	"Rock City Road"		4:37
15.	"That's the Way I've Always Heard It Should Be"	Carly Simon, Brackman	4:59
16.	"Turning It Over to You"		2:21

== Personnel ==
- Mindy Jostyn - vocals, ukulele (track 1), guitar (tracks 2, 4, 14–16), violin (tracks 2, 6–7, 9, 13, 15), tiple (track 2), accordion (tracks 3, 6–7, 10–11, 13), banjolin (track 3), penny whistle (track 3), piano (tracks 4–6, 8–9, 12–13), harmonica (tracks 5, 8, 12, 14), chimes (track 5), synth (tracks 7, 9, 15), mandolin (track 16), recorder (track 16)
- Jacob Brackman - vocals (track 1), featuring (track 5)
- Catherine Russell - backing vocals (tracks 2–4, 6)
- Carly Simon - backing vocals (tracks 4, 6), synth (tracks 4, 6), percussion (tracks 4, 6)
- Janie Barnett - backing vocals (tracks 9, 11, 16)
- Dave Phillips - backing vocals (track 9)
- John Putnam - electric guitar (tracks 2–3, 5, 14), ukulele (track 10)
- Marc Muller - electric guitar (tracks 4, 9, 15), dobro (track 6), guitar (track 8)
- Geoff Patterson - pedal steel guitar (track 9)
- Stuart Kimball - acoustic guitar (tracks 9, 12)
- Tommy Mandel - piano (tracks 5, 8, 13), synth (track 13)
- Joel Diamond - piano (tracks 6, 11), Hammond organ (tracks 6, 12)
- Aaron Heick - clarinet (tracks 8, 13)
- Alfredo Scotti - bass (tracks 2–3, 6, 14), guitar (tracks 3–4), backing vocals (track 14)
- Paul Adamy - bass (tracks 4, 8–12, 15)
- Conrad Korsch - upright bass (tracks 5, 13)
- Jeff Berman - drums (tracks 2, 5, 8, 10–11, 15), percussion (tracks 4–5, 9, 15)
- Graham Hawthorne - drums (tracks 3–4, 6, 9, 12–14), percussion (track 15)
- Rick Bausman - percussion (tracks 3, 14)
