= Emilia (album) =

Studio album by Emilia
- Released: November 2000
- Label: Universal

Emilia chronology
| Big Big World (1998) | Emilia (2000) | Små ord av kärlek (2007) |

Emilia is a studio album by Swedish singer Emilia released in November 2000. Saleswise, the album became less successful than her previous album.

== Track listing ==
1. Sorry I'm in Love - 3:04 (A. Carlsson, D. Carr, T. Champlin)
2. Kiss by Kiss - 4:00 (D. Carr, P. Lönn, A.D. Rich)
3. Johnny Come Lately - 3:09 (A. Cantrall, S. Selover)
4. Before I Fall - 3:20 (J. Elofsson, T. Cox)
5. Girlfriend 2:55 (J. Lindman)
6. Playin' It By Heart - 3:54 (A. Carlsson, D. Carr, A.D. Rich, A.R. Scott)
7. If It's Gonna Be You - 3:07 (J. Lindman, E. Rydberg)
8. What If I Told You... - 3:51 (D. Eriksen, E. Rydberg)
9. Heaven - 3:36 (B. Adams, J. Vallance)
10. My Love Is True - 3:14 (D. Carr, P. Lönn, E. Rydberg)
11. Tell Me Why - 3:55 (M. Pettersen, T. Eriksen)
12. Say You Will (Or Say You Won't) - 3:52 (P. Söderqvist, N. Windahl, E. Rydberg)
13. Supergirl - 3:09 (D. Carr, P. Bruhn, E. Rydberg)
14. Supergirl Outro - 1:06 (D. Carr, P. Bruhn, E. Rydberg)

== Contributors ==
- Emilia – vocals
- Johan Lindman – guitar
- Douglas Carr – guitar, keyboards

== Charts ==
| Chart (2000–2001) | Peak position |
|---|---|
| Swedish Albums (Sverigetopplistan) | 51 |
| Swiss Albums (Schweizer Hitparade) | 43 |
