= Big Big World (album) =

Studio album by Emilia
- Released: 23 October 1998
- Genre: Pop
- Length: 34:00
- Label: Universal, BBC Worldwide

Emilia chronology
Big Big World (1998)	Emilia (2000)

Big Big World is the debut studio album by Swedish recording artist Emilia. It was released on 23 October 1998.

== Commercial performance ==
The album was certified platinum in Norway and Sweden and gold in Switzerland. The album has sold 200,000 units in Scandinavia while the single "Big Big World" has reached the platinum status (30,000 units) in Sweden only in 11 days. The single stayed in number 1 spot for seven consecutive weeks and it has passed 100,000 units in Sweden.

== Track listing ==
All songs Written by Emilia Rydberg & Lasse "Yogi" Anderson

1. Good Sign – 3:02
2. Big Big World – 3:22
3. Come into My Life – 3:17
4. Twist of Fate – 3:45
5. Like Chocolate – 3:03
6. What About Me? – 3:30
7. Life (Will Never Be The Same) – 3:08
8. Daddy's Girl – 2:58
9. Adam & Eve – 4:24
10. Maybe, Baby – 3:08
11. Big Big World (TNT's Big Phat Mix) 3:12
12. Maybe, Baby (Swing Style) 3:24

== Contributors ==
- Emilia – vocals, composer
- Lasse Anderson – composer
- Johan Granström – bass
- Peter Ljung – keyboards
- Göran Elmquist – guitar
- Christer Jansson – drums, percussion

== Charts ==
Chart (1997–1999)	Peak position
Australian Albums (ARIA)	172
Austria (Ö3 Austria Top 40)	6
Belgium (Ultratop Flanders)	46
Finland (Official Finnish Charts)	14
France (SNEP)	48
Hungarian Albums (MAHASZ)	19
Netherlands (Megacharts)	76
Norway (VG-lista)	4
New Zealand (RIANZ)	34
Switzerland (Swiss Hitparade)	2
Sweden (Sverigetopplistan)	14

=== Year-end charts ===
Chart (1999)	Position
German Albums Chart	61

== Certifications ==
Region	Certification	Certified units/sales
Norway (IFPI Norway)	Platinum	50,000^{*}
Spain (PROMUSICAE)	Gold	50,000^{^}
Sweden (GLF)	Platinum	80,000^{^}
Switzerland (IFPI Switzerland)	Gold	25,000^{^}
^{*} Sales figures based on certification alone.^{^} Shipments figures based on certification alone.
