= Små ord av kärlek =

Studio album by Emilia
- Released: 18 April 2007
- Label: Universal

Emilia chronology
Emilia (2000)	Små ord av kärlek (2007)	My World (2009)

Små ord av kärlek (Small Words of Love) is a studio album by Swedish singer Emilia, released on 18 April 2007. The album was her first sung in Swedish rather than English.

== Track listing ==
1. Var minut (Hvert minut)
2. Du är
3. En sång om kärleken (En sang om kærlighed)
4. Det är inte det du säger
5. Säg du är säker
6. Inget svar
7. Lär mig att älska
8. Ord som bara du får höra
9. Sommardag
10. Jag ser det klart
11. Fotspår i snön
12. Små ord av kärlek
13. Var minut ("Hvert minut") (radio edit)
14. Det är inte det du säger (Peo de Pitte nightshift remix)

== Personnel ==
- Emilia - vocals
- Tue West - guitar, drums, bass, keyboard
- Peo Häggström - keyboard
- Pär Lönn - keyboard, guitar, programme
- Peter Nordahl - grand piano, piano
- Jan Lysdahl - bas, guitar, keyboard, drums, percussion

== Charts ==
Chart (2007)	Peak position
Denmark (Tracklisten)	11
Sweden (Sverigetopplistan)	22
