= Boys Will Be Boys (The Hooters song) =

1993 single by the Hooters

Single by the Hooters

from the album Out of Body
- Released: 1993
- Genre: Pop rock
- Length: 4:30 (single version); 4:42 (album version)
- Label: MCA
- Songwriter(s): Rob Hyman; Eric Bazilian; Cyndi Lauper
- Producer(s): Joe Hardy; Eric Bazilian; Rob Hyman

The Hooters singles chronology
"Twenty Five Hours a Day" (1993)	"Boys Will Be Boys" (1993)	"Private Emotion" (1993)

"Boys Will Be Boys" is a song by American rock band The Hooters, which was released in 1993 as the second single from their fifth studio album Out of Body. The song was written by Rob Hyman, Eric Bazilian and Cyndi Lauper, and produced by Joe Hardy, Bazilian and Hyman. Lauper also provides guest vocals on the song.

== Background ==
"Boys Will Be Boys" was co-written with Cyndi Lauper, who also contributed guest vocals on the track. She first worked with Hyman and Bazilian on the recording of her 1983 debut album She's So Unusual, which included the Hyman/Lauper-penned "Time After Time". Hyman and Bazilian collaborated with Lauper again for her fourth album Hat Full of Stars (1993) by performing on the album and co-writing five of the tracks, including the single "That's What I Think".

The Hooters originally suggested Lauper record the song herself. Bazilian told The News Journal in 1993: "We thought this would be great for Cyndi. She liked the song, but thought it was better for us, but she did sing on it." The song begins with a ten-second rendition of the chorus of "Wild Mountain Thyme".

== Critical reception ==
In a review of Out of Body, Barbara Jaeger of The Record described the song as an "Irish-inflected rocker" which with "Twenty Five Hours a Day" gets the album "off to a brilliant start". John Everson of the Southtown Star considered the song to be the Hooters' "playful answer" to "Girls Just Want to Have Fun", with Lauper's appearance "brighten[ing] up the proceedings". Scott Benarde of The Palm Beach Post felt the collaboration between the Hooters and Lauper was a "winning formula" on the "muscular pop-rock tune". Ira Robins of Trouser Press described the song as an "ebullient number that could have gone on Lauper's first album".

== Track listing ==
CD single

1. "Boys Will Be Boys" - 4:30
2. "All Around the Place" - 3:45
3. "Thing of Beauty" - 3:23

== Personnel ==
Boys Will Be Boys

- Eric Bazilian - lead vocals, guitars, bass guitar, recorder, bass melodica
- Rob Hyman - synth, accordion, triangle, vocals
- Mindy Jostyn - violin, string arrangement
- David Uosikkinen - drums, tambourine

Additional musicians

- Cyndi Lauper - guest vocals

Production

- Joe Hardy - producer, engineer, mixing
- Eric Bazilian, Rob Hyman - producers, engineers
- Erik Flettrich - assistant engineer
- George Marino - mastering

== Charts ==
Chart (1993)	Peak position
Germany (GfK)	53
Sweden (Sverigetopplistan)	20
