= Big Big World (song) =

1998 single by Emilia Rydberg

Single by Emilia Rydberg

from the album Big Big World
- Released: 17 September 1998
- Genre: Pop
- Length: 3:22
- Label: Rodeo; Universal
- Songwriters: Emilia Rydberg; Lasse Anderson
- Producers: Urban "Hurb" Eriksson; Jørgen "TNT" Møller; Günter "Yogi" Lauke

Emilia Rydberg singles chronology
"Big Big World" (1998)	"Good Sign" (1999)

Music video
- "Big Big World" on YouTube

"Big Big World" is a song by Swedish singer Emilia. It was released on 17 September 1998 by Rodeo and Universal as the lead single from the album Big Big World and was written by Emilia and Lasse Anderson. The song is about love, with references to the autumn season. The melody opening is based on the Swedish springtime song "Nu grönskar det", which in turn is based on the Peasant Cantata by Johann Sebastian Bach.

"Big Big World" was a hit in Europe, where it reached number one in eight countries and peaked within the top five in several others, but it fared less well in the United States, where it remained at the bottom of the Billboard Hot 100, though it did reach the top 40 on two other Billboard charts. The song was given a Grammis award for "Song of the Year" in 1998 and also won a Rockbjörnen award as "Swedish Song of the Year" same year. On 20 September 2017, "Big Big World" was the topic at SVT's Hitlåtens historia. Its accompanying music video, shot in black-and-white, was filmed in New York City.

== Critical reception ==
AllMusic editor Roxanne Blanford wrote that the song is "gentle", arranged as a "pseudo-procession tune", "as if Emilia is taking her first cautious steps toward independence and adulthood." Chuck Taylor from Billboard magazine said that its "magic touch" is "manifested via sheer straightforward simplicity-in performance, production, and message." He noted Emilia's "delicate voice, ripe with vulnerability and hurt, tells of being a big girl in a big world who shouldn't see it as a big deal if her partner leaves her ... but she will miss him much." He also added that "allusions to rain and autumn leaves help set up a perfect visual of stark sadness and loneliness, giving the song a strong seasonal punch." A reviewer from Birmingham Evening Mail stated that "this is another one of those Love It or Hate It records", adding that "its incessant beat and simple rhythm will either drive you mad or drive you to put it on the CD player again...and again."

Scottish Daily Record called the song "chirpy". Swedish Expressen named "Big Big World" the "big, obvious hit this fall", and Göteborgsposten stated that with this song, Emilia "has a big, big hit". Chuck Campbell from Knoxville News Sentinel said the 20-year-old vocalist "assumes a sweetly fragile persona on the song, setting the mood with a sparse verse and chorus before the track folds in a shuffling beat and an orchestral arrangement." Nina Cassidy from Stanford Daily noted that it "has a catchy beat, and the lyrics and music have a smooth flow." Sunday Tribune called it a "sweet song", while Sunday World named it a "cracking single". Kerry Gold from The Vancouver Sun deemed it "a song of such easy listening it could double as a nursery rhyme."

== Chart performance ==
"Big Big World" reached number one in eight countries: Austria, Belgium (Flanders), Germany, the Netherlands, Norway, Spain, Sweden and Switzerland. In Sweden, the song set a record for the fastest-played single on Swedish radio, receiving airplay at least once every 13 minutes. It also topped the Eurochart Hot 100 on 27 February 1999. The single reached number two in Denmark, France, Hungary, Italy and Wallonia. It was also a top-10 hit in Finland, Greece, Ireland, and the United Kingdom. Outside Europe, "Big Big World" peaked at number three in New Zealand, number 17 in Australia, number 39 in Canada, and number 92 on the US Billboard Hot 100.

It was awarded with a gold record in France, New Zealand and Switzerland; a silver record in the United Kingdom; a platinum record in Austria, Germany, and the Netherlands; and a multi-platinum disc in Belgium, Norway and Sweden.

== Music video ==
The music video for "Big Big World" was recorded in New York City and is shot in black-and-white. It features Emilia wandering around in the city, performing the song at different places. Some scenes show the singer in the crowd of walking people on the street, other scenes shows her sitting on the edge at the top of a 12-storey high house. She is also seen standing in front of a window with a view.

== Track listings ==
- European CD single
1. "Big Big World" – 3:22
2. "Big Big World" (Traffic Jam mix—88 BPM) – 4:14
- UK CD single
1. "Big Big World" (radio edit) – 3:22
2. "Big Big World" (album version) – 3:22
3. "Big Big World" (Pierre J's big radio remix) – 3:29
4. "Big Big World" (TNT big big club mix) – 6:31
- UK cassette single
1. "Big Big World" (radio edit) – 3:22
2. "Big Big World" (Pierre J's big radio remix) – 3:29
- Australian maxi-CD single
1. "Big Big World" (album version) – 3:22
2. "Big Big World" (Pierre J's big radio remix) – 3:30
3. "Big Big World" (TNT's big phat radio edit) – 3:12
4. "Big Big World" (karaoke version) – 3:22

== Charts ==
=== Weekly charts ===
Weekly chart performance for "Big Big World"
Chart (1998–1999)	Peak position
Australia (ARIA)	17
Austria (Ö3 Austria Top 40)	1
Belgium (Ultratop 50 Flanders)	1
Belgium (Ultratop 50 Wallonia)	2
Canada Top Singles (RPM)	39
Canada Adult Contemporary (RPM)	40
Denmark (IFPI)	2
Europe (Eurochart Hot 100)	1
Finland (Suomen virallinen lista)	4
France (SNEP)	2
Germany (GfK)	1
Greece (IFPI)	8
Hungary (Mahasz)	2
Iceland (Íslenski Listinn Topp 40)	14
Ireland (IRMA)	3
Italy (Musica e dischi)	2
Italy Airplay (Music & Media)	1
Netherlands (Dutch Top 40)	1
Netherlands (Single Top 100)	1
New Zealand (Recorded Music NZ)	3
Norway (VG-lista)	1
Poland Airplay (Music & Media)	4
Quebec (ADISQ)	4
Scottish Singles Sales (Official Charts)	7
Spain (AFYVE)	1
Sweden (Sverigetopplistan)	1
Switzerland (Schweizer Hitparade)	1
UK Singles (Official Charts)	5
US Billboard Hot 100	92
US Adult Pop Airplay (Billboard)	39
US Pop Airplay (Billboard)	26

=== Year-end charts ===
1998 year-end chart performance for "Big Big World"
Chart (1998)	Position
Austria (Ö3 Austria Top 40)	31
Belgium (Ultratop 50 Flanders)	3
Netherlands (Dutch Top 40)	84
Netherlands (Single Top 100)	25
Sweden (Hitlistan)	2
UK Singles (OCC)	76

1999 year-end chart performance for "Big Big World"
Chart (1999)	Position
Austria (Ö3 Austria Top 40)	7
Belgium (Ultratop 50 Flanders)	40
Belgium (Ultratop 50 Wallonia)	23
Europe (Eurochart Hot 100)	6
Europe Airplay (Music & Media)	3
Europe Border Breakers (Music & Media)	28
France (SNEP)	8
Germany (Media Control)	4
Netherlands (Dutch Top 40)	37
Netherlands (Single Top 100)	16
Romania (Romanian Top 100)	62
Switzerland (Schweizer Hitparade)	4
UK Singles (OCC)	199

=== Decade-end charts ===
Decade-end chart performance for "Big Big World"
Chart (1990–1999)	Position
Austria (Ö3 Austria Top 40)	77
Belgium (Ultratop 50 Flanders)	19
Netherlands (Dutch Top 40)	52

== Certifications ==
Certifications and sales for "Big Big World"
Region	Certification	Certified units/sales
Austria (IFPI Austria)	Platinum	50,000^{*}
Belgium (BRMA)	2× Platinum	100,000^{*}
France (SNEP)	Gold	250,000^{*}
Germany (BVMI)	Platinum	500,000^{^}
Netherlands (NVPI)	Platinum	75,000^{^}
New Zealand (RMNZ)	Gold	5,000^{*}
Norway (IFPI Norway)	2× Platinum	
Sweden (GLF)	3× Platinum	90,000^{^}
Switzerland (IFPI Switzerland)	Gold	25,000^{^}
United Kingdom (BPI)	Silver	200,000^{^}
^{*} Sales figures based on certification alone.^{^} Shipments figures based on certification alone.

== Release history ==
Release dates and formats for "Big Big World"
Region	Date	Format(s)	Label(s)	Ref.
Sweden	17 September 1998	CD	Rodeo; Universal	
United Kingdom	30 November 1998	CD; cassette	Rodeo; Universal	
Japan	24 February 1999	CD	Universal	
