= Kiss by Kiss =

Single by Emilia Rydberg

from the album Emilia
- A-side: "Kiss by Kiss"
- B-side: "Kiss by Kiss" (instrumental version)
- Released: 2001 (Sweden)
- Recorded: Diamond & Platina Room, Lacarr Studios, Stockholm, Sweden
- Label: Universal
- Songwriters: Douglas Carr, Pär Lönn, Allan Dennis Rich, Emilia Rydberg

Emilia Rydberg singles chronology
"Sorry I'm in Love" (2000)	"Kiss by Kiss" (2001)	"When You Are Here" (2001)

Kiss by Kiss is a song written by Douglas Carr, Pär Lönn, Allan Dennis Rich and Emilia Rydberg, and recorded by Emilia Rydberg on her 2000 album, Emilia. In 2001, the single was released in Sweden.

Emilia Rydberg performed the single at Bingolotto at TV4 on 13 January 2001, which was the first time she performed it at TV.

== Track listing ==
1. Kiss by Kiss (radio edit)
2. Kiss by Kiss (instrumental version)

Maxisingle

1. Kiss by Kiss (radio edit)
2. Kiss by Kiss (Pierre J:s radio mix)
3. Kiss by Kiss (Pierre J:s remix)
4. Kiss by Kiss (Pierre J:s funked up-remix)

== Charts ==
Chart (2001)	Peak position
Belgium (Ultratop Flanders)	52
Switzerland (Swiss Hitparade)	52
