= Five Miles from Hope =

Studio album by Mindy Jostyn
- Released: October 24, 1995
- Length: 49:22
- Label: 1-800-Prime-CD (US); Demon (UK)
- Producer: Gary Burke

Mindy Jostyn chronology
Five Miles from Hope (1995)	Cedar Lane (1997)

Five Miles from Hope is the debut studio album from American singer and multi-instrumentalist Mindy Jostyn, released in 1995. "Time, Be On My Side" is a duet with Carly Simon. Garth Hudson plays accordion on "Common Ground" and Donald Fagen plays melodica on "Too Easy".

== Critical reception ==
Professional ratings
Review scores
Source	Rating
AllMusic	4.5/5 stars
The Encyclopedia of Popular Music	3/4 stars
The Record	3.5/4 stars

In a contemporary review, Steven C. Johnson of The Record considered Five Miles from Hope to be an "auspicious debut". He commented: "Jostyn crafts poignant, intelligent songs, and at times, sings them with utter abandon. The songs on this debut reveal just how wide Jostyn's range is and just how many emotions she can plausibly convey in her music." Steve Morse of The Boston Globe felt the album "proves Jostyn to be a skilled songwriter", but felt "her singing isn't quite on par with her instrumental skills".

AllMusic selected Five Miles from Hope as an "album pick", with Richard Meyer describing it as "folk-rock" with a "soul/jazz tinge". He praised Jostyn's "expressive" vocals and the "crisp stadium folk sound", concluding "If you like the best aspects of Melissa Manchester, Pat Benatar or Patty Smyth, this a record worth checking out."

== Track listing ==
All tracks are written by Mindy Jostyn and Jacob Brackman.

No.	Title	Length
1.	"All Roads"	4:42
2.	"Time, Be On My Side"	3:17
3.	"Five Miles from Hope"	4:23
4.	"Take It As a Sign"	4:15
5.	"White Magic"	3:14
6.	"Bring Love Back"	4:24
7.	"Ring of Truth"	3:17
8.	"Common Ground"	3:24
9.	"Different Light"	5:22
10.	"So Far from Anywhere"	4:05
11.	"Too Easy"	4:25
12.	"She Cried in Front of Strangers"	4:41

== Personnel ==
- Mindy Jostyn - vocals, violin, harmonica, acoustic guitar
- Marc Muller - electric guitar, acoustic guitar, pedal steel, mandolin
- Shane Fontayne - electric guitar
- Hugh McDonald - bass
- Gary Burke - drums, Hammer dulcimer

Additional musicians

- Ben Odom, Theresa Sergick, Rose Odom - backing vocals
- Carly Simon - vocals (track 2)
- Garth Hudson - accordion (track 8)
- Donald Fagen - melodica (track 11)
- Larry Packer - violin (track 12)
- Rob Turner - cello (track 12)

Production

- Gary Burke - producer
- Paul Antonell - recording

Other

- Tony Nagelmann - photography
- Corsillo/Manzone - art direction
