= Twenty Five Hours a Day =

1993 single by the Hooters

Single by the Hooters

from the album Out of Body
- Released: 1993
- Length: 3:50
- Label: MCA
- Songwriters: Rob Hyman; Eric Bazilian; Jerry Lynn Williams
- Producers: Joe Hardy; Eric Bazilian; Rob Hyman

The Hooters singles chronology
"Silent Night" (1990)	"Twenty Five Hours a Day" (1993)	"Boys Will Be Boys" (1993)

"Twenty Five Hours a Day" is a song by American rock band The Hooters, which was released in 1993 by MCA Records as the lead single from their fifth studio album, Out of Body (1993). The song was written by Rob Hyman, Eric Bazilian and Jerry Lynn Williams, and produced by Joe Hardy, Bazilian and Hyman. It was released as a promotional single in the United States and generated some airplay on album rock radio. In Europe, the song reached No. 28 on the Dutch Single Top 100 chart.

== Background ==
"Twenty Five Hours a Day" was written by merging a song Hyman and Bazilian wrote together with part of a song Jerry Williams offered to the band. Bazilian told The News Journal in 1993 of the song's inception: "We put together a cool sort of musical track, rock 'n' roll with a little Celtic thing. It was obvious Jerry Williams's song wasn't right [for us], but we did love the bridge part. Rob and I were working on a song in July 1992 and came up with the title and decided it worked with [our] other song and then realized Jerry's part [also] worked. We put it together like a little Frankenstein."

The song was released as the band's debut single on MCA. The record company made the decision to release it as the album's lead single. Hyman told The Citizens' Voice in 1993: "The powers-that-be felt we should return with an uptempo song. It was a marketing decision, but we gave it our stamp of approval because it symbolized the kind of music we make."

== Music video ==
The song's music video was directed by Maurice Todman and produced by Jo Cadman. It was shot at the Franklin Institute in Philadelphia.

== Critical reception ==
On its release, Larry Flick of Billboard magazine felt the song was "vocally reminiscent" of the band's earlier hits and "merits a investigation of the group". He noted the song "goes by at warp speed, and is also injected with fresh sounds - gospel backing singers [and] Irish fiddle". Music & Media commented: "The festive folky intermezzos - an invitation to a square dance - make this straightforward pop song an instant ear-catcher."

In a review of Out of Body, Barbara Jaeger of The Record described the song as an "Irish-inflected" and "full-bodied" rocker which with "Boys Will Be Boys" gets the album "off to a brilliant start". Patrick Davitt of The Leader-Post praised it as "an exuberant rocker marked with overt Celtic folk-music breaks and Jostyn's soaring vocal fill at the end". Tom Moon, writing for Knight-Ridder Newspapers considered the song "one of the few tracks that works its way up to a roar, but it loses steam every time the gratuitous Irish-jig counter-melody appears."

== Track listing ==
- CD single (European release)
1. "Twenty Five Hours a Day" - 3:50
2. "Nobody But You" - 5:21
3. "Strange Strange World" - 4:01
- CD single (Japanese release)
1. "Twenty Five Hours a Day" - 3:50
2. "Nobody But You" - 5:21
- CD single (US and UK promos)
1. "Twenty Five Hours a Day" - 3:50

== Personnel ==
Twenty Five Hours a Day

- Rob Hyman - lead vocals, Hammond organ, synth, moog bass, accordion, handclapping
- Eric Bazilian - guitars, mandolin, recorder, tambourine, handclapping, vocals
- Mindy Jostyn - violin, vocals, handclapping
- Fran Smith Jr. - bass guitar
- John Lilley - low vocals
- David Uosikkinen - drums

Additional personnel

- Erik Flettrich - handclapping

Production

- Joe Hardy - producer, engineer, mixing
- Eric Bazilian, Rob Hyman - producers, engineers
- Erik Flettrich - assistant engineer
- George Marino - mastering

== Charts ==
Chart (1993)	Peak position
Europe (European Hit Radio)	30
Netherlands (Single Top 100)	28
Netherlands (Tipparade)	2
Germany (GfK)	74
US AOR Tracks (Radio & Records)	40
