= I Belong to You (album) =

Studio album by Emilia Mitiku
- Released: 11 February 2013
- Genre: Pop
- Length: 47:05
- Label: Warner Sweden
- Producer: Anders Hansson

Emilia Mitiku chronology
My World (2009)	I Belong to You (2013)

I Belong to You is an album by Swedish pop singer Emilia Mitiku. It was released on 11 February 2013.

== Track listing ==
1. So Wonderful (Anders Hansson, Sharon Vaughn, Emilia Mitiku)
2. Lost inside (Anders Hansson, Sharon Vaughn, Emilia Mitiku)
3. I Belong to You (Anders Hansson, Sharon Vaughn, Emilia Mitiku)
4. Ohh la la (Anders Hansson, Sharon Vaughn, Emilia Mitiku)
5. Zou Bisou Bisou (Bill Shepherd, Alan Tew)
6. You're Not Right for Ne (Anders Hansson, Sharon Vaughn, Emilia Mitiku)
7. Dream a little dream (Fabian Andree, Wilbur Schwandt, Gus Kahn)
8. Officially a Fool (Anders Hansson, Sharon Vaughn, Emilia Mitiku)
9. Again (Dorcas Cochran, Lionel Newman)
10. You're Breaking My Heart (Klaus Doldinger, Anders Hansson, Emilia Mitiku)
11. Winter Beach (Anders Hansson, Sharon Vaughn, Emilia Mitiku)
12. Substitute Arms (Anders Hansson, Sharon Vaughn, Emilia Mitiku)
13. Witchcraft (Cy Coleman, Carolyn Leigh)
14. Forgive Me (Anders Hansson, Sharon Vaughn, Emilia Mitiku)

== Personnel ==
- Emilia Mitiku - singer
- Anders Hansson - drums, percussion, producer
- Harry Wallin - drums, percussion
- Andreas Unge - drums, percussion
- Staffan Astner - guitar
- Henrik Jansson - guitar
