= Aurélie Claudel =

French model, actress (born 1980)

- Born: August 7, 1980 (age 46); Laxou, France
- Modeling information
- Height: 1.74 m (5 ft 8 1/2 in)
- Hair color: Brown
- Eye color: Hazel
- Agency: IMG Models (New York, Paris, London); MP Milan (Milan); Elite Model Management (Amsterdam); Two Management (Los Angeles); PARS Management (Munchen); Stockholmsgruppen (Stockholm)

Aurélie Claudel (born 7 August 1980) is a French model and actress.

== Biography ==
Claudel has been featured on the covers and as well as inside pages of a variety of high-fashion magazines including Vogue (American, Italian, French, German, Spanish, Japanese, Australian), Marie Claire (American, Italian, French, German), Glamour (American, Italian, French), Elle (American, British, French, Spanish, Italian), Harper's Bazaar, Allure, Numéro, Arena, W, D Magazine, the Pirelli calendar and the Sports Illustrated Swimsuit Issue.

Claudel has worked with fashion photographers like Steven Meisel, Herb Ritts, Irving Penn, Mario Testino, Patrick Demarchelier, Peter Lindbergh, Craig McDean, Paolo Roversi, Gilles Bensimon, Steven Klein and David Bailey.

In addition to her print work, Claudel has appeared in numerous ad campaigns including Ralph Lauren, Valentino, Chanel, Chloé, Armani, Nautica, DKNY, Trussardi Jeans, Nina Ricci, Bill Blass, Oscar De La Renta. Cesare Paciotti, Cole Haan, Sephora, Emanuel Ungaro and Victoria's Secret. She was also the face of Calvin Klein's fragrance, Truth and held a cosmetics contract with Revlon, Ultima, Guerlain and Clarins.

She has also been a runway model for many designers including Victoria's Secret, Tommy Hilfiger, Ralph Lauren, Marc Jacobs, Jill Stuart, Diane Von Furstenberg, Jil Sander, Fendi, Christian Dior, Dolce & Gabbana, Richard Tyler, Christian Lacroix, Vivienne Westwood, DKNY, Nicole Miller, BCBG, Vera Wang, Halston, Vivienne Tam, Cynthia Rowley and Hugo Boss.

Claudel made a special guest appearance in the Ricky Martin video "Private Emotion" directed by Francis Lawrence.

== Filmography ==
- Fading Gigolo directed by John Turturro
- Alter Egos directed by Jordan Galland
- Ricky Martin's "Private Emotion" video
