= My World (Emilia Rydberg album) =

Studio album by Emilia
- Released: 23 September 2009
- Genre: Soul pop
- Label: Warner Sweden

Emilia chronology
Små ord av kärlek (2007)	My World (2009)	I Belong to You (2013)

My World is a studio album by Swedish singer Emilia, released on 23 September 2009.

== Track listing ==
1. "Teardrops" - 3:34
2. "You're My World" - 2:53
3. "I'll Get Over You" - 3:35
4. "Coming Home" - 2:51
5. "Two Roads" - 3:22
6. "The Story" - 3:45
7. "Stars" - 3:21
8. "Song 4 You" - 3:17
9. "Doesn't Get Better" - 3:42
10. "Right Side of Life" - 3:29
11. "Luckily" - 4:19
