= Cedar Lane (album) =

Studio album by Mindy Jostyn
- Released: April 22, 1997
- Length: 51:16
- Label: Palmetto
- Producer: Matt Balitsaris

Mindy Jostyn chronology
Five Miles from Hope (1995)	Cedar Lane (1997)	In His Eyes (1998)

Cedar Lane is the second studio album from American singer and multi-instrumentalist Mindy Jostyn, released by Palmetto in 1997.

== Critical reception ==
In a contemporary review, Nick Cristiano of The Philadelphia Inquirer wrote: "Jostyn offers tongue-in-cheek laments, chronicles boomer realities, tackles topical issues and delves into affairs of the heart from various angles. She covers it all with a delivery that ranges convincingly from quiet country ache to bluesy toughness." Mike Joyce of The Washington Post praised Jostyn's "gift as a writer of dreamy musings, topical essays and torchy ballads" which he felt pointed to "a very promising future" for her.

Jef Scoville of The Christian Science Monitor noted the versatility of the material on Cedar Lane ("blues, folk, pop, talking blues, jazz"), and praised the range of Jostyn's vocals "from little-girl-sweet through bad-girl-growl, innocent and soft, to torchy sizzle".

Charles M. Young, writing for Playboy, wrote: "On Cedar Lane, Jostyn writes songs ranging from hilarious to poignant, sings them with subtle conviction and plays a mean harmonica." Scott Alarik of The Boston Globe considered Jostyn to be one of the "most exciting songwriters to emerge in some time". He commented: "Her funny satires have a knack for making points without pointing fingers; her ballads reveal a poet's aim for life's revealing little moments. Everything is delivered with sparkling musicality and emotional voice."

== Track listing ==
All tracks are written by Mindy Jostyn and Jacob Brackman except where noted.

No.	Title	Writer(s)	Length
1.	"Other Guy's Girls"		3:52
2.	"Calamity Jane"		4:46
3.	"Love Can Bring Us Together"		4:06
4.	"So Fragile"	Jostyn, Brackman, Alfredo Scotti	3:41
5.	"Cedar Lane"		4:20
6.	"I'll Thank You Someday"		4:15
7.	"Power, Sex and Money"	Jostyn, Brackman, Marc Muller	4:10
8.	"Gypsy Soul"		4:05
9.	"Too Far Gone"	Billy Sherrill	3:40
10.	"Trouble I Don't Need"		4:29
11.	"That Was Then"		4:34
12.	"Looking for Jesus Again"		4:14
13.	"Kiss"	Prince	1:04

== Personnel ==
- Mindy Jostyn - vocals (tracks 1–13), violin (tracks 2, 6–9, 12–13), harmonica (tracks 1, 5, 10, 12), mandolin (tracks 2–3, 5), piano (track 12), accordion (tracks 2–3, 5), acoustic guitar (tracks 1–5, 7, 9–11)
- Matt Balitsaris - electric guitar (tracks 1, 4, 6–7, 10–11), acoustic guitar (tracks 3–4), slide guitar (track 3)
- Paul Adamy - bass (tracks 1, 5, 10), acoustic bass (track 3), fretless bass (tracks 4, 7)
- Jeff Berman - drums (tracks 1–3, 5–7, 10), percussion (tracks 2–5, 7–9, 12–13), washboard (tracks 3, 5, 13)
- David Finck - string bass (tracks 6, 9, 12)
- Tony Trischka - banjo (track 5)

Production

- Matt Balitsaris - producer, additional engineering
- A. T. Michael MacDonald - engineer, mastering
- Scott Ansell - additional engineering

Other

- Bob Gothard, The Jostyn Family, Annie Boylan - photography
- Corsillo/Manzone-Design Monsters - design
- Sandra La Vallee - art direction
