= Out of Body (The Hooters album) =

Studio album by the Hooters
- Released: May 11, 1993
- Recorded: 1993
- Studios: Ardent Studios, Memphis; The Ranch, Philadelphia
- Genre: Rock
- Length: 45:27
- Label: MCA
- Producers: Joe Hardy; Eric Bazilian; Rob Hyman

The Hooters chronology
Zig Zag (1989)	Out of Body (1993)	The Hooters Live (1994)

Singles from Out of Body
- 1. "Twenty Five Hours a Day" Released: 1993; 2. "Boys Will Be Boys" Released: 1993; 3. "Private Emotion" Released: 1994

Professional ratings
Review scores
Source	Rating
AllMusic	3/5 stars

Out of Body is the fifth studio album by the American rock band the Hooters. It was released on May 11, 1993 by MCA Records.

== Background ==
Out of Body marked a series of firsts for the Hooters. It was their first album for MCA Records after having released their three previous albums on Columbia Records. It was the first time they had worked with producer Joe Hardy, whose credits included ZZ Top, Steve Earle and Tom Cochrane. Also, the Hooters had become a six-piece band for the first time, after the addition of violinist and singer Mindy Jostyn.

Band members Eric Bazilian and Rob Hyman first met Jostyn backstage after a 1989 Billy Joel concert at the Spectrum in Philadelphia. She was given a copy of their previous album Zig Zag and two years later, in December 1991, they called her in New York and asked to get together with them. Jostyn officially joined the band in January 1992.

The recording process for Out of Body was also significantly different than their previous efforts. Rather than allow the band to work on a song significantly before recording, as they had always done, producer Joe Hardy took tracks directly from the Hooters' demos and made them "commit and move on." The resulting album was recorded in just four weeks, whereas previous albums by the band had taken four to six months to record.

One of the songs on the album, "Private Emotion," would go on to become an international hit single for Ricky Martin in 2000, with both Hyman and Bazilian contributing to the new recording.

== Track listing ==
All tracks are written by Rob Hyman and Eric Bazilian, except where noted.

No.	Title	Writer(s)	Length
1.	"Twenty Five Hours a Day"	Hyman; Bazilian; Jerry Lynn Williams	3:50
2.	"Boys Will Be Boys"	Hyman; Bazilian; Cyndi Lauper	4:42
3.	"Shadow of Jesus"	Bazilian; Glenn Goss	5:35
4.	"Great Big American Car"	Hyman; Bazilian; Wendy Waldman	5:16
5.	"Private Emotion"		3:58
6.	"Driftin' Away"		4:57
7.	"Dancing on the Edge"	Hyman; Bazilian; John Bettis	3:38
8.	"All Around the Place"		3:45
9.	"One Too Many Nights"		4:25
10.	"Nobody But You"	Hyman; Bazilian; Williams	5:21

Japanese bonus track
No.	Title	Writer(s)	Length
11.	"Strange Strange World" (B-side of "Twenty Five Hours a Day")	Hyman; Bazilian; Waldman	4:06

== Personnel ==
Adapted from the album liner notes.

The Hooters

- Rob Hyman – lead vocals, piano, organ, synthesizer, Mellotron, accordion, percussion, melodica
- Eric Bazilian – lead vocals, guitars, mandolin, bass guitar, sitar, melodica, saxophone, recording, synthesizer, percussion
- David Uosikkinen – drums, percussion
- John Lilley – guitar, background vocals
- Fran Smith Jr. – bass guitar, background vocals, tambourine
- Mindy Jostyn – violin, background vocals, guitar, harmonica, string arrangements

Additional musicians

- Cyndi Lauper – lead vocals (track 2)
- The Memphis Horns:

Andrew Love – tenor saxophone (tracks 8, 10)
Wayne Jackson – trumpet, trombone (tracks 8, 10)

- Linda Minke – cello (track 3)
- Max Huls – violin (track 3)

Technical

- Joe Hardy – production, engineering (digital), mixing (digital) (at Ardent Studios)
- Eric Bazilian – production, engineering (analog) (at The Ranch)
- Rob Hyman – production, engineering assistance (analog) (at The Ranch)
- Erik Flettrich – engineering assistance (digital) (at Ardent Studios)
- George Marino – mastering (at Sterling Sound)
- Bo Bartlett – art direction, cover art (anolog)
- Greg Merkle – design, cover art (digital)
- Rob Hyman – cover concept
- Eric Bazilian – cover concept
- Charles Grumbling – art production guru
- Michael Dwornik – photography
- Robin Schoen – typography (heads)
- Norisol Valero – typography (threads)

== Charts ==
=== Weekly charts ===
Chart (1993)	Peak position
German Albums (Offizielle Top 100)	59
Japanese Albums (Oricon)	67
Norwegian Albums (VG-lista)	12
Swedish Albums (Sverigetopplistan)	13
Swiss Albums (Schweizer Hitparade)	33
