= Meja (album) =

Studio album by Meja
- Released: 1996
- Genre: Pop
- Label: Epic
- Producer: Douglas Carr, Jonas "Joker" Berggren, Anders Bagge, Slick, Per Adebratt, Tommy Ekman

Meja chronology
Meja (1996)	Seven Sisters (1998)

Singles from Meja
- 1. "I'm Missing You" Released: 1996; 2. "How Crazy Are You?" Released: 1996; 3. "Welcome to the Fanclub of Love" Released: 1996; 4. "I Wanna Make Love" Released: 1996; 5. "Rainbow" Released: 1996

Meja is the self-titled debut studio album by Swedish singer-songwriter Meja, released in 1996 by Epic Records. After being part of dance group Legacy of Sound since 1993, Meja met Lasse Karlsson, then-manager of Ace of Base, who introduced her to songwriter Douglas Carr, who went on to produce the album. Meja was a relative failure commercially in Sweden—only charting at number 29—but was a huge success in the Japanese market where it sold 600,000 copies.

== Track listing ==
No.	Title	Writer(s)	Producer(s)	Length
1.	"Welcome to the Fanclub of Love"	Douglas Carr, Janne Taneli-Juntilla, Meja	Carr
2.	"How Crazy Are You?"	Carr, Taneli-Juntilla	Carr
3.	"I Wanna Make Love"	Jonas "Joker" Berggren, Carr, Meja	Carr, Berggren
4.	"Invisible"	Carr, Meja	Carr
5.	"I Didn't Know"	Ben Watt, Tracey Thorn	Carr
6.	"Rainbow"	Billy Steinberg, Carr, Meja	Carr
7.	"My Best Friend"	Alexander Kronlund, Meja	Anders Bagge, Slick
8.	"Daniellas Eyes"	Kronlund, Meja	Carr
9.	"April Love"	Kronlund, Meja	Carr
10.	"It Ain't Over"	Carr, Taneli-Juntilla	Carr
11.	"I'm Missing You"	Per Adebratt, Tommy Ekman, Carr, Meja	Adebratt, Ekman, Carr
12.	"Flower Girl"	Carr	Carr

== Chart positions ==
Chart (1996)	Peak position
Sweden	29

== Certifications ==
Region	Certification	Certified units/sales
Sweden (GLF)	Gold	50,000^{^}
^{^} Shipments figures based on certification alone.

== In popular culture ==
The song "How Crazy Are You?" was featured in the video game Dead or Alive Xtreme Beach Volleyball for the Xbox, where it plays during the opening movie.
