= Seven Sisters (Meja album) =

Studio album by Meja
- Released: 5 February 1998
- Genre: Pop
- Label: Columbia
- Producers: Douglas Carr, John Amatiello, Meja

Meja chronology
Meja (1996)	Seven Sisters (1998)	Realitales (2000)

Singles from Seven Sisters
- 1. "Pop & Television" Released: 1998; 2. "All 'Bout the Money" Released: 1998; 3. "Lay Me Down" Released: 1998; 4. "Beautiful Girl" Released: 1998; 5. "Radio Radio" Released: 1998; 6. "Intimacy" Released: 1999

Seven Sisters is the second studio album by Swedish singer-songwriter Meja, released in 1998 by Columbia Records. Again she collaborated with Billy Steinberg, along with her producer Douglas Carr and Jörgen Elofsson. The album came to be her international breakthrough with her massive hit "All 'Bout the Money". The song was released worldwide and gave her awards such as "Best Album of the Year" “Best selling Scandinavian artist" at the World Music Awards in Monte Carlo and "Best Pop Album" The album also features singles like "Intimacy" and "Pop & Television" The album sold approximately 1 million units worldwide. "All About the Money" was also featured as a soundtrack to the Chevy Chase movie Funny Money in 2006. The album was produced by Douglas Carr.

== Track listing ==
Standard version
No.	Title	Writer(s)	Producer(s)	Length
1.	"Daughter of Mornin'"	Douglas Carr, Janne Taneli-Juntilla, Meja	Carr	2:31
2.	"Luxury"	Carr, Taneli-Juntilla, Meja	Carr	3:24
3.	"Pop & Television"	Carr, Meja	Carr	3:25
4.	"All 'Bout the Money"	Carr, Meja	Carr	2:52
5.	"Beautiful Girl"	Jonas "Joker" Berggren, Carr, Meja	Carr, John Amatiello	3:33
6.	"Lay Me Down"	Tom Kelly, Billy Steinberg, Meja	Carr	2:54
7.	"Intimacy"	Steinberg, Rick Nowels, Neil Geraldo	Carr, Amatiello	3:53
8.	"Too Many Nights Late"	Carr, Meja	Carr, Amatiello	3:07
9.	"Do the Angels Have a Home?"	Jörgen Elofsson, Lars Karlsson	Carr, Meja	4:00
10.	"Caught Up in the Middle"	Carr, Meja	Carr	3:50
11.	"Lullaby Song"	Carr, Taneli-Juntilla, Meja	Carr	2:39
12.	"Seven Sisters Road"	Carr, Taneli-Juntilla, Teresa Cox, Meja	Carr	3:32

US and European version (bonus track)
No.	Title	Writer(s)	Producer(s)	Length
13.	"How Crazy Are You?"	Carr, Taneli-Juntilla	Carr	3:32

== Chart positions ==
Chart (1998–1999)	Peak position
Finland	40
Norway	1
Sweden	8

=== Year-end charts ===
Chart (1998)	Position
Japanese Albums (Oricon)	60

== Certifications ==
Region	Certification	Certified units/sales
France (SNEP)	Gold	100,000^{*}
Japan (RIAJ)	3× Platinum	600,000^{^}
Norway (IFPI Norway)	Platinum	50,000^{*}
Sweden (GLF)	Gold	40,000^{^}
^{*} Sales figures based on certification alone.^{^} Shipments figures based on certification alone.
