= Meja =

Swedish composer, artist and singer

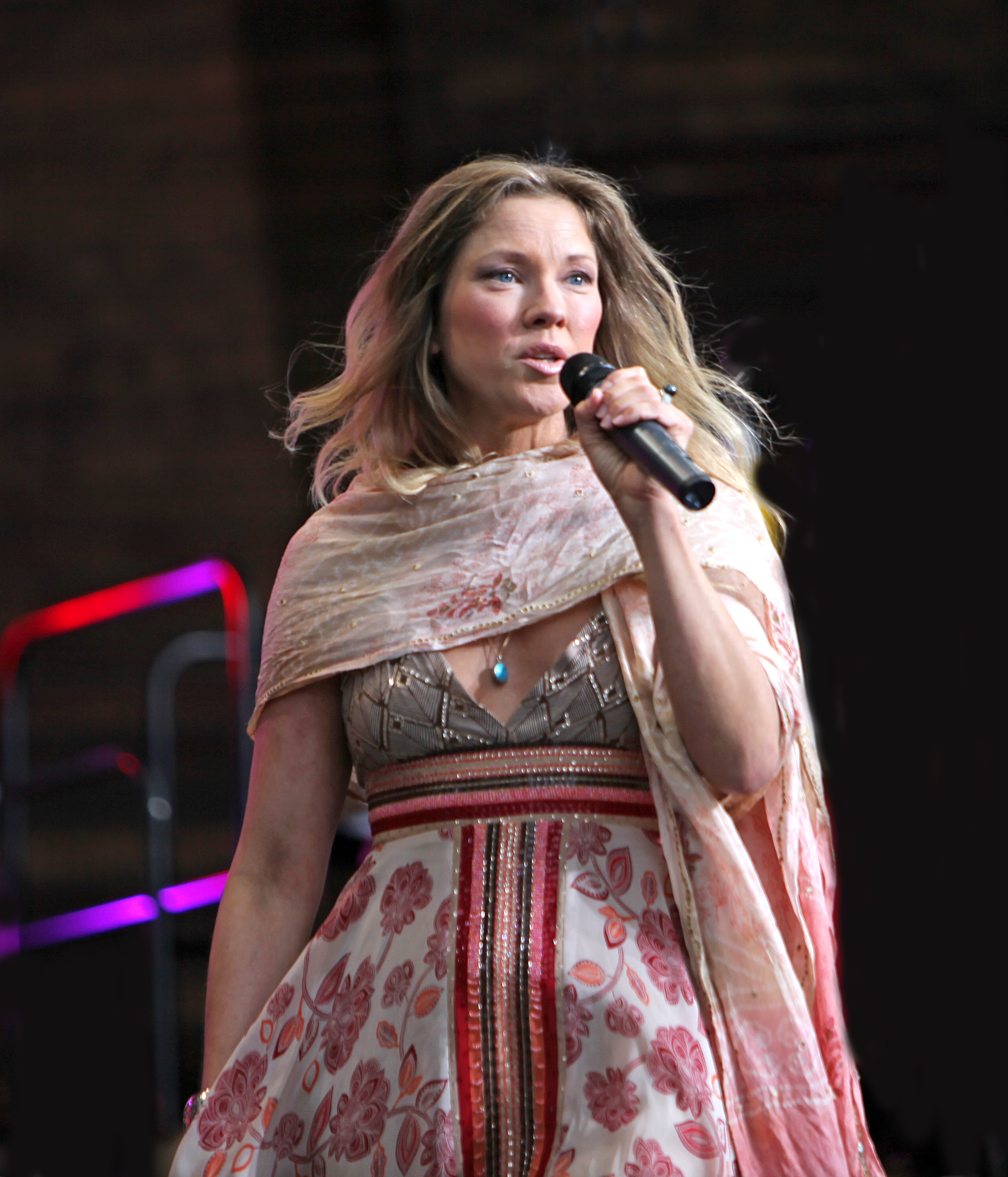
- Meja performing live at Skansen in Stockholm, Sweden during celebrations of the Swedish National Day in June 2009

Background information
- Born: Anna Pernilla Torndahl; 12 February 1969 (age 57); Nynäshamn, Sweden
- Origin: Sweden
- Genre: Pop rock
- Occupations: Singer; songwriter
- Instruments: Vocals, guitar
- Years active: 1992–present
- Labels: C2, Columbia, Sony, Seven Sisters Network Records
- Website: mejaart.com

Meja Anna Pernilla Kullersten (formerly Beckman; born Anna Pernilla Torndahl, 12 February 1969) is a Swedish singer and songwriter. Among her best known songs are "Happy" (with Legacy of Sound), "Private Emotion", a duet with Ricky Martin from his album Ricky Martin (1999), and "All 'Bout the Money", which was nominated for a Swedish Grammy Award in 1998.

== Biography ==
Meja was born Anna Pernilla Torndahl in Nynäshamn, Stockholm County. She had her stage debut at "Ystads City theatre" at the age of 7. She was brought up in a musical family, her grandfather, Per Lundkvist, was a composer of both classical and contemporary music and her mother, a recording artist as a child before choosing a path as a painter.

In 1986, at the age of 16, she moved to Mallorca, Spain, to study. She was introduced to American jazz trumpet player/singer Stephen Frankevich and started to take vocal lessons with singer Deborah Carter.

Meja went to Stockholm in 1990. She sang in different bands there before getting out on tour as a backup singer for the Swedish group Rob n Raz DLC in 1991. In 1992 Meja moved to Los Angeles to continue her studies at the Musicians Institute in Hollywood. She graduated from the vocal program in late 1992 then returned to Sweden.

=== Legacy of Sound (1993–1995) ===
In 1993, Meja worked with the dance project Legacy of Sound. She co-wrote with Anders Bagge the first single, "Happy", from the album Holy Groove. The song reached the Top 10 on the Billboard Hot Dance Music/Club Play chart, and it peaked at number 68 on the Top 100 during a 12-week stay on the chart. "Happy" was released in over 20 countries. Meja recorded one more album with Legacy of Sound in 1994, Tour de Force.

=== Solo artist ===
Meja teamed in 1995 with Swedish manager Lasse Karlsson, manager of Ace of Base, and writer/producer Douglas Carr to provide the vocals for the demo The Juvenile titled The Goldeneye.

The first solo album Meja, was released in 1996, with songs co-written by Billy Steinberg. In 1997 Meja had her first concert tour in Japan: The Flower Girl Jam Tour.

Meja released the album Seven Sisters in 1998. Later that year Columbia (Sony) launched the album in the U.S with the single "How Crazy Are You?" That song would later be notable for its use as the theme song for Dead or Alive Xtreme Beach Volleyball.

=== Realitales (2000) ===
Meja went to Miami in 1999 to record "Private Emotion", a duet with Ricky Martin for his debut album Ricky Martin. After shooting a video for the song, Meja stayed in Los Angeles to work on her next album Realitales (2000) with Steinberg. She also co-wrote two tracks for the album in London with Stephen Lipson. The artwork for this album was shot by Swedish director Jonas Åkerlund.

=== Mellow (2004) ===
In 2003 Meja started to work with her former Sony Music boss, Richard Ogden. The album Mellow was released in 2004, with songs in Portuguese ("Água de Beber", "Dindi") and Spanish. She covered a Caetano Veloso song "O Leãozinho" that she named "Little Lion." The album was produced by Hamish Stuart. One song, "Simple Days-Walking the Distance", was used in the Japanese film Lakeside Murder Case.

=== NU Essential (2005) ===
Sony Music Japan released Meja's album NU Essential in 2005.

=== Urban Gypsy (2009) ===
In 2006 Meja went back to Los Angeles to collaborate again with Steinberg on a new album, also working with writers Jeff Barry, Billy Gibbons, Jed Leiber and Boz Boorer.

The first single "At the Rainbow's End" was released in June 2009, the second single "Regrets (I Have None)" in August, and the album Urban Gypsy was released on her own label Seven Sisters Network in October on a license deal with Sony Music. A remix of Mando Diao's "Dance with Somebody" was released early 2010.

=== AniMeja (2010) ===
As a tribute to the Japanese Studio Ghibli, Meja released an album on which she covered soundtrack songs from Japanese films.

=== Stroboscope Sky (2015) ===
The first release from the album Stroboscope Sky was the single "Blame it on the Shadows" (2013) produced by Ebbot Lundberg. Meja teamed with producer Nicolas Gunthardt and together with his sister Alessandra they wrote "Yellow Ribbon" which served as the theme song for the album. "Yellow Ribbon" was released as a single in collaboration with Amnesty International/Free the Angola 3 to help raise awareness of the case of Albert Woodfox. A remix EP was released with remixes by Deep Forest, Dj Swami, Gota Yashiki, DF Tram, NORD and more.

== Discography ==
=== Albums ===
==== Studio albums ====
Title	Details	Peak chart positions				Certifications
Title	Details	SWE	FIN	JPN	NOR	Certifications
Meja	Released: 11 April 1996; Label: Epic, Sony; Formats: CD, cassette, digital download	29	—	7	—	RIAJ: Platinum
Seven Sisters	Released: 5 February 1998; Label: Columbia, Epic, C2Records; Formats: CD, cassette, digital download	8	40	6	1	RIAJ: 3× Platinum
Realitales	Released: 31 January 2000 (JPN) 5 March 2000 (SWE); Label: Columbia, Epic; Formats: CD, cassette, digital download	37	—	7	—	RIAJ: Gold
Mellow	Released: 18 February 2004 (JPN) 15 March 2004 (SWE); Label: Epic; Formats: CD, cassette, digital download	—	—	—	—	
Urban Gypsy	Released: 7 October 2009; Label: Columbia; Formats: CD, digital download	60	—	—	—	
AniMeja: Ghibli Songs	Released: 21 July 2010; Label: Sony; Formats: CD, digital download	—	—	97	—	
Stroboscope Sky	Released: 13 May 2015; Labe: Seven Sisters Network; Formats: CD, digital download	—	—	—	—	

==== Compilation and live albums ====
- Live in Japan-The Flower Girl Jam (1997)
- My Best (2002) (Certifications #JPN:Gold)
- The Nu Essential (2005)
- Original Album Collection (2010)
- Kozmic Surfer: Flower Girl 25th Anniversary (2019)
- Kozmic Surfer: Live in Japan (Acoustic) (2020)

=== Singles ===
Title	Year	Peak chart positions					Album
Title	Year	SWE	AUS	NOR	UK	US Pop	Album
"I'm Missing You"	1996	—	—	—	—	—	Meja
"How Crazy Are You?"	1996	—	—	—	—	—	Meja
"Welcome to the Fanclub of Love"	1996	—	—	—	—	—	Meja
"I Wanna Make Love"	1996	—	—	—	—	—	Meja
"Rainbow"	1996	—	—	—	—	—	Meja
"Pop & Television"	1998	—	—	—	—	—	Seven Sisters
"All 'Bout the Money"	1998	4	77	3	12	37	Seven Sisters
"Lay Me Down"	1998	—	—	—	—	—	Seven Sisters
"Beautiful Girl"	1998	—	—	—	—	—	Seven Sisters
"Radio Radio"	1998	—	—	—	—	—	Seven Sisters
"Intimacy"	1999	—	—	—	—	—	Seven Sisters
"Spirits"	2000	24	—	—	—	—	Realitales
"Hippies in the 60's"	2000	—	—	—	—	—	Realitales
"I'm Here Saying Nothing"	2001	—	—	—	—	—	My Best
"Wake Up Call"	2004	—	—	—	—	—	Mellow
"Life Is a River"	2004	—	—	—	—	—	Mellow
"At the Rainbows End"	2009	—	—	—	—	—	Urban Gypsy
"Regrets (I Have None)"	2009	—	—	—	—	—	Urban Gypsy
"Dance with Somebody"	2010	—	—	—	—	—	Non-album single
"Totoro"	2010	—	—	—	—	—	AniMeja: Ghibli Songs
"Blame It On the Shadows"	2013	—	—	—	—	—	Stroboscope Sky
"Yellow Ribbon"	2015	—	—	—	—	—	Stroboscope Sky
"Bohemian Behaviour"	2015	—	—	—	—	—	Stroboscope Sky
"I Know How You Feel"	2019	—	—	—	—	—	Kozmic Surfer: Flower Girl 25th Anniversary
"Strange Kinda Love"	2020	—	—	—	—	—	TBA
"—" denotes a recording that did not chart or was not released in that territory.

==== As featured artist ====
Title	Year	Peak chart positions							Album
Title	Year	SWE	AUS	FIN	NOR	UK	US	US Pop	Album
"Private Emotion" (Ricky Martin featuring Meja)	2000	8	59	6	7	9	67	32	Ricky Martin

== Awards ==
Award	Year	Nominee(s)	Category	Result	Ref.
Grammis	1994	Legacy of Sound	Modern Dance	Nominated	
Grammis	1999	Meja	Pop/Rock Female Artist	Nominated	
Grammis	1999	"All 'Bout the Money"	Song of the Year	Nominated	
Hit Awards	1999	"All 'Bout the Money"	Best Hit	Nominated	

- The North Wave Award, newcomer of the year, 1996, Japan
- Pop album of the year, Meja Japan 1996
- Artist of the year, Japan 1999
- 14th Japan Gold Disc Awards, 1999, Pop Album of the year, "Seven Sisters"
- World Music Awards 1999, Best-Selling Female Scandinavian Artist, Monte Carlo, Monaco
- The Swedish Society of Popular Music Composers Prize Award (SKAP) 2001
