= Sorry I'm in Love =

Single by Emilia Rydberg

from the album Emilia
- B-side: "Sorry I'm in Love" (instrumental version)
- Released: 30 October 2000 (Sweden)
- Recorded: Lacarr Studios, Stockholm, Sweden
- Label: Universal
- Songwriter(s): Andreas Carlsson, Tamara Champlin, Emilia Rydberg

Emilia Rydberg singles chronology
"Twist of Fate" (1999)	"Sorry I'm in Love" (2000)	"Kiss by Kiss" (2001)

"Sorry I'm in Love" is a song written by Andreas Carlsson, Tamara Champlin, Emilia Rydberg, and recorded by Emilia Rydberg on her 2000 album, Emilia. The single was released in Sweden on 30 October 2000.

== Track listings ==
1. "Sorry I'm in Love" (radio edit)
2. "Sorry I'm in Love" (instrumental version)

Maxi-single

1. "Sorry I'm in Love" (radio edit)
2. "Sorry I'm in Love" (JJ's club mix)
3. "Sorry I'm in Love" (JJ's radio)
4. "Sorry I'm in Love" (instrumental club version)

== Charts ==
Chart (2000)	Peak position
Sweden (Sverigetopplistan)	17

== Certifications ==
Region	Certification	Certified units/sales
Sweden (GLF)	Gold	15,000^{^}
^{^} Shipments figures based on certification alone.
