= Emilia Rydberg =

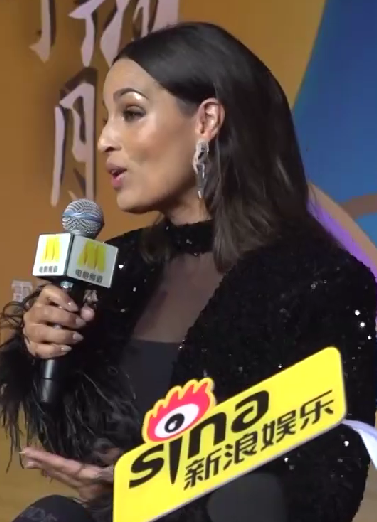

Background information
- Also known as: Emilia Mitiku
- Born: Hanna Emilia Rydberg-Mitiku; 5 January 1978 (age 48); Stockholm, Sweden
- Genres: Pop, soul
- Occupation: singer
- Years active: 1996–present
- Labels: Universal; Bonnier Music

Hanna Emilia Rydberg-Mitiku, known simply as Emilia (born 5 January 1978), is a Swedish pop and soul singer. Her 1998 hit single "Big Big World" reached number one on the music charts in several countries.

== Life and career ==
Rydberg's father is the Ethiopian singer Teshome Mitiku. Her mother, Malena Rydberg, is Swedish. As a student she attended the Adolf Fredrik's Music School in Stockholm.

Rydberg was discovered in 1996 by Lars Anderson, son of ABBA's manager, Stig Anderson. She used the mononym of Emilia in the first years of her career, but more recently she has started to perform under the name of Emilia Mitiku, using her father's surname. In 2009, she competed in Melodifestivalen, the Swedish national selection for Eurovision Song Contest, with the song "You're My World". She advanced directly from her heat; however, she placed ninth in the final. She released her album My World in 2009. Her single "Teardrops" was released to radio stations on 2 June 2009. Her duet with Ákos Dobrády, "Side By Side" (Szerelemre hangolva), was recorded in both Hungarian and English languages and issued the same year.

Emilia recorded a cover version of Rihanna's "We Found Love" for a studio session in Stockholm which was published on YouTube. On 25 June 2012 she released the single "Lost Inside".

In 2021, she joined the all-female group, Super Fëmmes, with a line-up consisting of Therese Grankvist, Denise Lopez, Mia Shotte, Josefine Willers and Emilia herself. In April 2022, the band released their debut single, a cover of Rozalla's 1991 hit "Everybody's Free".

== Discography ==
=== Albums ===
Year	Album	Peak positions			
Year	Album	SWE	AUS	FIN	GER
1998	Big Big World	14	172	14	6
2000	Emilia	51	–	–	—
2007	Små ord av kärlek	22	–	–	—
2009	My World	–	–	–	—
2013	I Belong to You	–	–	–	—

=== Singles ===
Year	Title	Chart positions															
Year	Title	AUT	AUS	BEL (Vl)	BEL (Wa)	NED	FIN	FRA	GER	IRE	NZ	NOR	SWE	SWI	UK	US	US Pop
1998	"Big Big World"	1	17	1	2	1	4	2	1	3	3	1	1	1	5	92	26
1999	"Good Sign"	27	182	44	28	52	–	21	32	–	–	–	16	27	54	–	–
1999	"Twist of Fate"	–	–	–	–	–	–	–	–	–	–	–	37	–	–	–	–
2000	"Sorry I'm in Love"	–	–	–	–	–	–	–	–	–	–	–	17	–	–	–	–
2001	"Kiss by Kiss"	–	–	52	–	–	–	–	56	–	–	–	–	52	–	–	–
2001	"When You Are Here" (with Oli. P)	–	–	–	–	–	–	–	45	–	–	–	–	–	–	–	–
2002	"Everybody" (with DJ BoBo)	–	–	–	–	–	–	–	–	–	–	–	–	–	–	–	–
2006	"Var minut"	–	–	–	–	–	–	–	–	–	–	–	2	–	–	–	–
2007	"En sång om kärleken"	–	–	–	–	–	–	–	–	–	–	–	14	–	–	–	–
2008	"I Won't Cry"	–	–	–	–	–	–	–	–	–	–	–	–	–	–	–	–
2008	"I Can Do It"	–	–	–	–	–	–	–	–	–	–	–	–	–	–	–	–
2009	"You're My World"	–	–	–	–	–	–	–	–	–	–	–	11	–	–	–	–
2009	"Teardrops"	–	–	–	–	–	–	–	–	–	–	–	–	–	–	–	–
As Emilia Mitiku
2012	"Lost Inside"	–	–	–	–	–	–	–	–	–	–	–	–	–	–	–	–
2012	"So Wonderful"	–	–	131	–	–	–	–	–	–	–	–	–	–	–	–	–
2013	"You're Not Right for Me"	–	–	–	–	–	–	–	–	–	–	–	–	–	79	–	–
2013	"You're Breaking My Heart"	–	–	–	–	–	–	–	–	–	–	–	–	–	–	–	–

Featured in

- 2010/2012: "Watch the Stars" (Bryan Rice featuring Emilia) (BEL (Vl): No. 91)
