= Legacy of Sound =

1990s Swedish band

Legacy of Sound was a Swedish band, which was active in the early 1990s. Members of the band included singer Meja Kullersten (before her successful solo career), Anders "Bag" Bagge, James Gicho, Lori Perry, Nevada Cato, and Peter Swartling.

Legacy of Sound released two albums, Holy Groove (1993), with the popular single "Happy", and Tour de Force (1994). "Happy" was a surprise hit in the United States, peaking at #29 on the Billboard Mainstream Top 40 and spending 12 weeks on the Billboard Hot 100.

== Discography ==
=== Albums ===
- Holy Groove - Ariola (1993) #47 Sweden
- Tour de Force - Ricochet (7 July 1995)

=== Singles ===
- "Happy" - Ariola (24 July 1993) #18 Sweden
- "I Can't Let U Go" - Ariola (1993)
