= All 'Bout the Money =

1998 single by Meja

Single by Meja

from the album Seven Sisters
- B-side: "Are You Ready?"
- Released: 4 February 1998
- Genre: Pop
- Length: 2:53
- Label: Columbia
- Songwriters: Meja; Douglas Carr
- Producer: Douglas Carr

Meja singles chronology
"Pop & Television" (1998)	"All 'Bout the Money" (1998)	"Lay Me Down" (1998)

Music video
- "All 'Bout the Money" on YouTube

"All 'Bout the Money" (sometimes spelled as "All About the Money") is a song written by Swedish singer and songwriter Meja with Douglas Carr, and released as a single from Meja's second studio album, Seven Sisters (1998). The single was first issued in Japan in February 1998 and was released around Europe throughout the rest of the year.

"All 'Bout the Money" experienced chart success in many countries, peaking within the top 10 in Denmark, Greece, Japan, the Netherlands, Norway, and Sweden. In the United Kingdom, "All 'Bout the Money" reached number 12, while in the United States, it peaked at number 36 on the Billboard Dance Club Play chart and number 37 on the Billboard Mainstream Top 40 chart.

== Critical reception ==
Chuck Taylor from Billboard described the song as an "acoustic guitar-based pop tune that's at once intelligent, clever, and hooky enough to turn ships back to shore." He noted further that "this is mature pop from a budding artist who has plenty to say" and "it's got "hit" emblazoned on every note." In 2012, Porcys listed the song at number 14 in their ranking of "100 Singles 1990-1999".

== Charts ==
=== Weekly charts ===
Weekly chart performance for "All 'Bout the Money"
Chart (1998–1999)	Peak position
Australia (ARIA)	77
Austria (Ö3 Austria Top 40)	21
Belgium (Ultratop 50 Flanders)	20
Belgium (Ultratop 50 Wallonia)	19
Denmark (IFPI)	3
Europe (Eurochart Hot 100)	32
Finland (Suomen virallinen lista)	11
France (SNEP)	13
Germany (GfK)	96
Greece (IFPI)	8
Iceland (Íslenski Listinn Topp 40)	11
Italy (Musica e dischi)	21
Netherlands (Dutch Top 40)	8
Netherlands (Single Top 100)	11
New Zealand (Recorded Music NZ)	26
Norway (VG-lista)	3
Scottish Singles Sales (Official Charts)	28
Sweden (Sverigetopplistan)	4
UK Singles (Official Charts)	12
US Dance Singles Sales (Billboard)	36
US Pop Airplay (Billboard)	37

=== Year-end charts ===
1998 year-end chart performance for "All 'Bout the Money"
Chart (1998)	Position
Netherlands (Dutch Top 40)	68
Netherlands (Single Top 100)	99
Sweden (Hitlistan)	10

1999 year-end chart performance for "All 'Bout the Money"
Chart (1999)	Position
Romania (Romanian Top 100)	21

== Certifications ==
Certifications and sales for "All 'Bout the Money"
Region	Certification	Certified units/sales
France (SNEP)	Gold	250,000^{*}
Norway (IFPI Norway)	Gold	
Sweden (GLF)	Platinum	30,000^{^}
^{*} Sales figures based on certification alone.^{^} Shipments figures based on certification alone.

== Release history ==
Release dates and formats for "All 'Bout the Money"
Region	Date	Format(s)	Label(s)	Ref.
Japan	4 February 1998	CD	Epic	
United Kingdom	12 October 1998	CD; cassette	Columbia	
United States	26 January 1999	Contemporary hit radio	C2	
