= Spirits (Meja song) =

Single by Meja

from the album Realitales
- Released: August 14, 2000
- Recorded: 1999
- Genre: Pop
- Length: 4:09
- Label: Columbia
- Songwriters: Douglas Carr; Meja
- Producers: Douglas Carr; Ulric Johansson

Meja singles chronology
"Intimacy" (1999)	"Spirits" (2000)	"Hippies in the 60's" (2000)

"Spirits" is a song by Swedish singer-songwriter Meja. It was released in August 2000 as the first single from her third album Realitales. It was written by Meja and Douglas Carr and it peaked at number 24 on the Swedish Singles Chart.

== Music video ==
The music video for the song features Meja, wearing a long white gown, in a futuristic room. There are also scenes of her submerge in a bathtub filled with water. Also there's a scene where she transforms into a younger girl and an elderly woman.

== Track listings ==
Maxi-Single

1. "Spirits" – 4:09
2. "Spirits" (Instrumental) – 4:08

CD, Single

1. "Spirits" (CD, Single, Promo) – 4:09
2. "Spirits" (CD, Maxi) – 4:09
3. "Spirits" (CD, Single, Gat) – 4:09

== Charts ==
Chart (2000)	Peak position
Swedish Singles Chart	24
