= Hvert minut =

2002 song by Søren Poppe

Song by Søren Poppe
- Released: 2002
- Songwriters: Jan Lysdahl, Søren Poppe

Hvert minut is a song written by Jan Lysdahl and Søren Poppe, and originally released by Søren Poppe in the year 2002.

== Emilia Rydberg recording ==
Pär Lönn and Emilia Rydberg wrote lyrics in Swedish, as "Var minut". With these lyrics, the song was recorded by Emilia Rydberg, who released it as a single in 2006. She also recorded it on the 2007 album Små ord av kärlek.

=== Single track listings ===
1. Var minut
2. Var minut (R&B)
3. Efter festen

=== Charts ===
Chart (2006–2007)	Peak position
Sweden	2
