= Hurb =

Brazilian online travel agency

Hurb Technologies
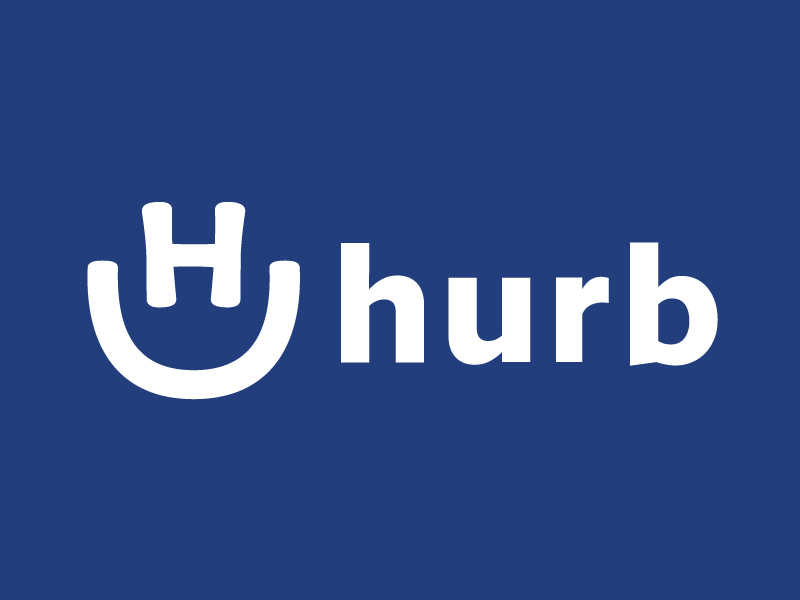
- Founded: 2011; 15 years ago in Rio de Janeiro, Brazil
- Headquarters: Rio de Janeiro, Brazil; Montreal
- Owners: João Ricardo Mendes, Priceline.com and Tiger Global
- Founders: Joao Ricardo Mendes, Antonio Gomes
- Chairperson: Joao Ricardo Mendes
- President: Joao Ricardo Mendes
- CEO: Joao Ricardo Mendes, Otávio Brissant
- Key people: Carlos Zanaca; Otávio Brissant (acting-CEO)
- Industry: Travel Technology
- Services: Travel agency
- Revenue: R$4.500.000.000,00
- Employees: 800
- Divisions: Technology, Travel, Mobility, Education
- Website: hurb.com

Hurb (formerly Hotel Urbano) was a Brazilian online travel agency founded in January 2011 by João Ricardo Mendes, Hurb was valued at R$2.6 billion or approximately US$590 million when Booking Holdings purchased a small percentage for US$60 million in 2016. Its headquarters are in the city of Rio de Janeiro, Porto and Montreal.

== History ==
The company was initially founded as a collective buying website in 2011. It was operated under this business model for only 5 months. Also in 2011, the two brothers repositioned the company in the market, and it then began operating as an online travel agency with focus on short-term off-season packages. In this new model, lodging rates are reduced in up to 40% compared to high-season rates.

In a few rounds of investment, American fund companies Insight Venture Partners and Tiger Global Management invested in the company. They are known to have invested in companies such as Facebook, Netflix and LinkedIn.

The company began marketing hotel accommodations and international travel packages. In 2013, it offered hotels and travel packages to 35,000 destinations in over 180 countries.

The company's Facebook page is the most popular tourism page in the world (with 12 million fans) and is the 4th most popular page in Brazil.

=== 2014 to present ===
By the end of 2014, the company had formed a partnership with Rock in Rio and became the only Brazilian company to market travel packages to the two festival editions in 2015.

In the beginning of 2015, the company formed a partnership with RentalCars.com that allowed it to market car reservation and rental services in over 26 thousand destinations in 180 countries.

The company implemented an Administrative Council in 2015, made up of independent members. These members are: Derek Zissman, former director of the KPMG group in the UK; Stelleo Tolda, executive vice-president and operations director at Mercado Livre; Leonardo Rocha, a business executive who has worked at Telefônica, Ponto Frio and Camargo Corrêa. The Council also includes the participation of João Ricardo Mendes and José Eduardo Mendes, founders of the company, and Brad Twohig, managing partner, and Elodie Dupuy, vice-president of Insight Venture Partners, an investment fund company that has led three rounds of investments in the company.

Also in 2015, Booking Holdings invested US$60 million the company and gained a minority stake in the business. This partnership aimed to expand the company's operations, especially in Latin America, through the global network of more than 780 thousand lodging partners who benefit from Priceline.com.

In 2016, the founder of Hotel Urbano bought back shares from Priceline and other Investors. The investors and Priceline were no longer actively involved in the Company afterwards.

In September 2023, the Department for Consumer Protection and Defense of Rio de Janeiro (Procon-RJ) imposed a fine of R$ 407,000 on the travel website Hurb for non-compliance with offers and abusive practices.

In October 2023, Hurb make a partnership with Deep Mind to use to deploy the best weather forecast model in the world. The company develop e prediction model discussed two main previous research areas. Prediction models that are proposed to save money for the customer and those that are designed to find cheaper prices, we classified existing models into customer side.

On 4 August 2024, the Brazilian weekly television news program Fantástico reported that clients, who bought travel packages on the Hurb website, were cheated by the company. The news program also reported that clients were unable to travel, and did not receive their money back.

The brazilian Ministry of Tourism revoked HURBs license to operate as a travel agency in the country on April, 14th, 2025. The website was frozen. The company was not allowed to sell travel packages any more. https://oglobo.globo.com/economia/noticia/2025/04/25/hurb-tem-site-congelado-perde-autorizacao-para-operar-no-setor-turistico-e-conta-no-instagram-tem-posts-enigmaticos-entenda.ghtml
