= Mindy Jostyn =

American singer and multi-instrumentalist (1956–2005)

Mindy Jostyn (June 5, 1956 – March 10, 2005) was an American singer and multi-instrumentalist.

Jostyn was born in Long Island City and grew up in San Jose, California and Wellesley, Massachusetts. When she was eleven years old she founded her first band, The Tigers. As a young professional, she studied with Julie Lyonn Lieberman in New York City.

Her musical focal points were folk, rock and pop. She played violin, guitar and harp, among other instruments. Before embarking on her solo career she was much sought after by international artists such as Joe Jackson, Billy Joel, The Hooters, Cyndi Lauper, Jon Bon Jovi, Andreas Vollenweider and Shania Twain.

Jostyn was married to Jacob Brackman, an American journalist, author and lyricist. She died of cancer in March 2005 in Hudson, New York.

== Solo discography ==
- Five Miles from Hope (1995)
- Cedar Lane (1997)
- In His Eyes (1998)
- Blue Stories (2002)
- Coming Home (2005)

== "Sideman" activities ==
Jostyn performed with artists on their tours:

- Carly Simon (1996–2005)
- Cyndi Lauper "Sisters of Avalon"-Tour in Japan (1996)
- Andreas Vollenweider World tour (1995)
- John Mellencamp "Dance Naked"-Tour (1994)
- The Hooters "Out of Body" World Tour (1992–1993)
- Joe Jackson "Laughter and Lust" World Tour (1991)
- Billy Joel "Storm Front" World Tour (1989–1990)
- The New York Rock and Soul Revue (1989–1992)

She provided musical accompaniment on popular artists' recordings:

- Pat Benatar
- Shania Twain
- Jon Bon Jovi
- Kate Taylor
- Arlen Roth
- Lexie Roth
- John Waite
- Chaka Khan

She can be heard throughout several albums:

- The New York Rock and Soul Revue: Live at the Beacon (1991)
- Joe Jackson – Laughter & Lust Live (VHS, 1992)
- Donald Fagen – Kamakiriad (1993)
- The Hooters – Out of Body (1993)
- The Hooters – The Hooters Live (1994)
- John Waite – When You Were Mine (1997)
- Charlie McIntosh – Cold Rain (1994)
- Carly Simon – Film Noir (1997)
- Andreas Vollenweider – Kryptos Columbia (1997)
- Andreas Vollenweider – Cosmopoly (2000)
