= Oh My Love (disambiguation) =

"Oh My Love" is a 1971 song by John Lennon.

Oh My Love may also refer to:

- "Oh My Love" (The Score song), 2015
- Oh My Love (album), a 1994 album by Zard
- "Oh My Love", a song by Chris Brown from the 2011 album F.A.M.E.
- "Oh My Love", a song by Katyna Ranieri
- "Oh My Love", a song by FKA Twigs from the 2022 mixtape Caprisongs
- "O Meri Jaan" (lit. 'Oh My Love'), a song by R. D. Burman and Asha Bhosle from the 1970 Indian film The Train
- "O Meri Jaan" (lit. 'Oh My Love'), a song by KK and Pritam from the 2007 Indian film Life in a... Metro

== See also ==
- My Love (disambiguation)
- Love, Oh Love (disambiguation)
- Oh, Love (disambiguation)
- "O Mere Sona Re Sona" (lit. 'Oh My Love My Love'), a song by R. D. Burman, Asha Bhosle and Mohammed Rafi from the 1966 Indian film Teesri Manzil
