= Love, Oh Love =

Love, Oh Love, or, Love Oh Love, or, Love, Oh, Love, may refer to:

- Love Oh Love, a 1973 album by Leroy Hutson
- "Love Oh Love", a 2019 single and song by GFriend off the album Time for Us
- "Love Oh Love", a 2011 single by Nathan King (singer-songwriter)
- "Love, Oh Love", a 1992 music video and song by Lionel Richie from the album Back to Front
- "Love Oh Love", a 1973 song by Leroy Hutson, the eponymous title track off album Love Oh Love
- "Love, Oh Love", a 1963 tune by Billy Myles for Mongo Santamaría
- "Love Oh Love", a 1953 song by Esther Phillips off the single record "Cherry Wine" / "Love Oh Love"
- Aur Pyaar Ho Gaya (TV series), a 2014 Indian TV show released internationally as 'Love Oh Love'
- Love Oh Love (2026 film), a 2026 Indian film
- Love, Oh Love, a 2018 artbook by Ana da Silva

== See also ==
- "Oh! Love OH!" (Chinese: 愛, romanized: Ài, lit. 'Love'), a 2015 song by Nylon Chen (Chinese: 陳乃榮, romanized: Chén Nǎiróng) for Be with You (TV series) (Mandarin Chinese: 好想談戀愛, romanized: Hǎo Xiǎng Tán Liàn'ài, lit. 'I Really Want to Fall in Love')
- "Love Oh Love, Oh Please Come Home", a 1961 single by Reno and Smiley
- "Love Oh Love Oh Love", a 1972 song by Labi Siffre off the album Crying Laughing Loving Lying
- "Love O' Love", a 1996 song by The Subdues off the album Primitive Streak (album)
- "Love O' Love", a 1973 rendition of a traditional song by Don McLean off the album Playin' Favorites
- "Love o' Love", a 1967 song by Nina Simone off the album Silk & Soul
- "Love-a-Love-a-Love-a-Love-a-Love", a 1975 single by Labi Siffre
- "Love-A Love-A Love-A", a 1959 song by Marty Wilde off the record single "Donna"
- "Love-A-Love-A-Love-A", a 1957 song by Baker Knight off the single record "Love-A-Love-A-Love-A" / "High School Days"
- Oh, Love (disambiguation), including Ah Love, O'Love
- Oh My Love (disambiguation)
- Love (disambiguation)
- Oh (disambiguation)
