= Mon Amour =

Mon amour (French for 'my love') may refer to:

== Film and television ==
- Monamour, a 2006 Italian film
- Mon Amour: Shesher Kobita Revisited, a 2008 Indian Bengali-language film

== Music ==
- "Mon amour" (BZN song), 1976
- "Mon amour" (Klaus Dinger song), 1985
- "Mon amour" (Elsa Lunghini song), 2004
- "Mon amour" (Shakira song), from the album She Wolf, 2009
- "Mon Amour" (Zzoilo song), 2020
- "Mon amour" (Stromae and Camila Cabello song), 2022
- "Mon amour" (Annalisa song), 2023
- "Mon amour" (Slimane song), 2023

== See also ==
- My Love (disambiguation)
