= My Love =

My Love may refer to:

== Music ==
=== Albums ===
- My Love (Engelbert Humperdinck album), 1973
- My Love (Janice Vidal album), 2005, or the title song
- My Love (Lisa Brokop album), 1991, or the title song
- My Love (Petula Clark album), 1966, or the 1965 title song (see below)
- My Love: Essential Collection, a 2008 album by Celine Dion, or the title song (see below)
- My Love (J-Walk album), 2008
- My Love (Hebe Tien album), 2011
- My Love (EP), a 2009 EP by Enric Sifa

=== Songs ===
- "My Love" (Baekhyun song), 2020
- "My Love" (Celine Dion song), 2007
- "My Love" (The-Dream song), 2009
- "My Love" (Jill Scott song), 2008
- "My Love" (Joe song), 2007
- "My Love" (Julio Iglesias song), 1988
- "My Love" (Justin Timberlake song), 2006
- "My Love" (Kele Le Roc song), 1999
- "My Love" (Lee Jong-hyun song), 2012
- "My Love" (Leigh-Anne song), 2023
- "My Love" (Lionel Richie song), 1983
- "My Love" (Little Texas song), 1994
- "My Love" (London Boys song), 1987
- "My Love" (Martin Solveig song), 2018
- "My Love" (Mary J. Blige song), 1992
- "My Love" (Namie Amuro song), 2009
- "My Love" (Paul McCartney and Wings song), 1973
- "My Love" (Petula Clark song), 1965
- "My Love" (Rosy & Andres song), 1976
- "My Love" (Route 94 song), 2014
- "My Love" (Westlife song), 2000
- "My Love", by Ciara from Ciara: The Evolution
- "My Love", by Florence and the Machine from Dance Fever
- "My Love", by Jack Gilinsky, 2020
- "My Love", by Sharon Kovacs, 2014
- "My Love", by Lene Marlin from Another Day
- "My Love", by Lenny Kravitz from Are You Gonna Go My Way
- "My Love", by Majid Jordan from the self-titled album
- "My Love", by Pixie Lott from Turn It Up
- "My Love", by Selena from the self-titled album
- "My Love", by Sia from The Twilight Saga: Eclipse
- "My Love", by Wale from Shine
- "My Love", by Whitney Houston from Just Whitney

== Film and television ==
- My Love (1940 film), a Soviet comedy film
- My Love (1970 film), a Bollywood romance
- My Love (2006 film), a Russian animated short film by Aleksandr Petrov
- My Love (2007 film), a South Korean romantic comedy
- Saawariya, or My Love, a 2007 Indian film by Sanjay Leela Bhansali
- My Love (2021 film), a Chinese romantic drama film
- My Love, a 2005 Russian television series starring Denis Matrosov
- Meu Amor, English My Love, a 2009-2010 Portuguese telenovela
- My Love (2006 TV series), South Korean television show

== Other uses ==
- My Love (horse), French Thoroughbred racehorse that won the 1948 Epsom Derby

== See also ==
- Oh My Love (disambiguation)
- Mon Amour (disambiguation)
- "My Love, My Love", a 1953 popular song
- My Love, My Love (film), a 1967 French drama
- "Min kärlek", a 2004 song by Shirley Clamp
- Madatha Kaja, a 2011 Indian film
- Term of endearment
- Mylove, a village in Ukraine
