= Ay Amor =

Ay Amor (Spanish: Ah Love) may refer to:

- Ay, Amor, a 1996 album by Ana Bárbara
- "Ay Amor" (Ana Gabriel song), 1987
- "Ay Amor" (Fonseca song), 2011
- "Ay Amor", a song by Flans
- "Ay! Amor", a song by Nena Daconte
- "Ay Amor", a 2003 song by Héctor & Tito from La Historia Live
- "Ay Amor", a song by Myriam Hernández
- "¡Ay! Amor", a song by Lorenzo Antonio
- "¡Ay Amor!", a 1997 song by MDO from MDO

== See also ==
- Oh, Love (disambiguation)
- Amor (disambiguation)
- AY (disambiguation)
- All pages with titles containing "Ay" and "Amor"
