= Oh, Love =

Oh Love, or, Ah Love, or, O' Love, may refer to:

== Songs ==
- "Oh Love", a 2012 song by Green Day off the album Uno
- "Oh Love" (Brad Paisley and Carrie Underwood song), a 2007 song by Brad Paisley off the album 5th Gear
- "Oh Love", a 1959 song by Rusty and Doug off the single record "The Love I Want"\
- "Oh Love", a 1988 song by Voice of the Beehive off the album Let It Bee
- "Oh, Love!", a 2006 song by Melissa McClelland off the album Thumbelina's One Night Stand
- "Oh Love", an award-winning 2008 song from the film Nurse.Fighter.Boy
- "Oh Love", a 2011 song by Ane Brun off the album It All Starts with One
- "Oh, Love!", a 2012 song by William Beckett off the EP Walk the Talk; see The Pioneer Sessions
- "Oh, Love" (Mandarin Chinese: 愛唷, romanized: Ài yō), a 2016 song by Rainie Yang off the album Traces of Time in Love (Mandarin Chinese: 年輪說, romanized: Nián Lún Shuō)
- "Oh! Love" (Korean: 오! 사랑, romanized: O! Salang), a 2016 song by Jung Dong-ha off the album Dream
- "Oh Love", a 2017 song and single by MisterWives off the album Connect the Dots (MisterWives album)
- "Oh Love", a 2019 single by Wrabel
- "Oh Love", a 2019 single by Phildel off the album Wave Your Flags
- "Oh Love", a 1995 song by Hamsalekha for the Indian film Kona Edaithe
- "Oh Love", an unreleased Michael Jackson song recorded in 1994; see List of unreleased songs recorded by Michael Jackson
- "Oh, Love!" (Khmer: ចម្រៀងគូស្នេហ៍/អូ ស្នេហ៍អើយ!, romanized: O Snaeha Euy!), a song by Sinn Sisamouth and Ros Serey Sothea
- "Oh l'amour" (French: Oh Love), 1986 English-language single by British band Erasure
- "Ah! Love", a 2020 song by Seventeen off the EP record Semicolon (EP)

== Film and TV ==
- Oh Love, a 1990 Cambodian film; see List of Cambodian films of the 1990s
- Ah, L'Amour (French: Ah, Love), 1995 English-language animated short by American animator Don Hertzfeldt
- "Ah, Love!", 2023 episode 5 of Only Murders in the Building season 3

== Other uses ==
- O'Love Jacobsen, Nieuan politician

== See also ==
- "Oh! Love OH!" (Chinese: 愛, romanized: Ài, lit. 'Love'), a 2015 song by Nylon Chen (Chinese: 陳乃榮, romanized: Chén Nǎiróng) for Be with You (TV series) (Mandarin Chinese: 好想談戀愛, romanized: Hǎo Xiǎng Tán Liàn'ài, lit. 'I Really Want to Fall in Love')
- "O Erota!" (Greek: Oh Love!), a 2002 song by Anna Vissi off the album Mala: I Mousiki Tou Anemou
- "Aa Koi" (Japanese: 嗚呼 恋, lit. 'Ah, Love!'), a 2010 song by Cute off the album Shocking 5
- "Ah, Love, Love, Love!" (Japanese: ああ、好き、好き、好き！, romanized: Aa, suki, suki, suki!), 2005 episode of Doraemon (2005-2009)
- "Ah, Love, Love, Love!" (Japanese: ああ、好き、好き、好き！, romanized: Aa, suki, suki, suki!), 1979 episode of Doraemon (1979-2005)
- "Ah Love, Love" (Italian: Ah l'amore, l'amore). 2021 season 4 episode of Rocco Schiavone
- Love, Oh Love (disambiguation)
- Love (disambiguation); including "The Love", "A Love"
- Ay Amor (disambiguation) (Spanish: Oh Love)
