= Marty Wilde discography =

- Studio albums: 10
- EPs: 8
- Soundtrack albums: 1
- Live albums: 3
- Compilation albums: 22
- Singles: 56
- Video albums: 1
- Cast recording albums: 4

This article is the discography of English rock and roll singer Marty Wilde, including releases with the Wildcats, as part of the Wilde Three (with Joyce Wilde and Justin Hayward) and under various pseudonyms.

== Albums ==
=== Studio albums ===
Year	Title	Details	Peak chart positions
Year	Title	Details	UK
1959	Wilde About Marty	Released: August 1959; Label: Philips; Released in the US in 1960 by Epic as Bad Boy, with the inclusion of "Bad Boy" for "Mean Woman Blues"	—
1960	Versatile Mr. Wilde	Released: August 1960; Label: Philips; Released in the US and Canada in 1961 by Epic as Wilde About Marty	—
1969	Diversions	Released: May 1969; Label: Philips	—
1970	Rock 'n' Roll	Released: November 1970; Label: Philips	—
1976	Born to Rock 'n' Roll	Released: 1976; Label: Big M; Re-recorded tracks	—
1994	Solid Gold	Released: 1994; Label: Select	—
1996	It's Been Nice	Released: 1996; Label: Select; Re-recorded tracks	—
2010	Wilde on Track	Released: 2010; Label: –	—
2017	Songs for Your Children and Grandchildren	Released: 2017; Label: –	—
2020	Running Together	Released: 2 October 2020; Label: Pushka	75
2026	Let's Rock This Place	Released: 2026; Label: Cherry Red	?
"—" denotes releases that did not chart

=== Live albums ===
Year	Title	Details
2004	Live	Released: 2004; Label: –
2010	Marty Wilde and Star Guests Live at the London Palladium	Released: 2010; Label: –
2019	Solid Gold Tour 2019	Released: 2019; Label: –; Mini-album

=== Soundtrack albums ===
Year	Title	Details
1964	What a Crazy World	Released: 1964; Label: Piccadilly; Soundtrack to the film of the same name; Album by various artists

=== Cast recording albums ===
Year	Title	Details	Peak chart positions
Year	Title	Details	UK
1961	Bye Bye Birdie	Released: July 1961; Label: Philips; Original London cast recording from the musical of the same name	17
1967	Dr. Doolittle	Released: 1967; Label: March Arch; Studio cast recording of the film Doctor Doolittle	—
1968	Half a Sixpence	Released: 1968; Label: World Record Club; London cast recording from the musical of the same name	—
1970	Paint Your Wagon	Released: 1970; Label: Fontana; Studio cast recording of the film of the same name	—
"—" denotes releases that did not chart

=== Compilation albums ===
Year	Title	Details	Peak chart positions
Year	Title	Details	UK
1960	Marty Wilde Showcase	Released: June 1960; Label: Philips	—
1969	Wilde About Marty	Released: August 1969; Label: Fontana	—
1974	Good Rockin' – Then and Now	Released: July 1974; Label: Philips	—
1980	The Wildcat Rocker	Released: 1980; Label: Jan; Sweden-only release	—
1984	The Hits of Marty Wilde	Released: November 1984; Label: Philips	—
1991	Marty Wilde's Frantic Fifties	Released: 1991; Label: Philips	—
1993	Teenager in Love	Released: 1993; Label: Spectrum Music; Germany-only release	—
1995	The Best of Marty Wilde	Released: 1995; Label: Spectrum Music	—
2007	Born to Rock n' Roll - The Greatest Hits	Released: 5 March 2007; Label: See for Miles	19
2009	Endless Sleep	Released: 2009; Label: Weton	—
2010	The Full Marty	Released: April 2010; Label: Spectrum Music	—
2010	Bad Boy	Released: December 2010; Label: Delta	—
2011	Bad Boy	Released: November 2011; Label: Complete Rock'n'Roll	—
2015	Rock! Rock! Rock'n'Roll!	Released: October 2015; Label: Hallmark Music	—
2015	The Very Best of Marty Wilde	Released: October 2015; Label: One Day Music	—
2016	Four Classic Albums Plus Singles	Released: 18 April 2016; Label: Real Gone Music	—
2017	Walk on the Wild Side – The Singles Collection 1957–1962	Released: 24 February 2017; Label: Jasmine	—
2018	The Essential Recordings	Released: 29 June 2018; Label: Primo	—
2018	Abergavenny: The Philips Pop Years 1966–1971	Released: 6 July 2018; Label: Teensville; Australia-only release	—
2019	Three Classic Albums Plus...	Released: 25 March 2019; Label: Avid	—
2019	Dreamboats and Petticoats Presents the Very Best of Marty Wilde	Released: 12 April 2019; Label: Universal Music on Demand	7
2019	A Lifetime in Music 1957–2019 – His Highlights and Rarities	Released: 7 June 2019; Label: RPM	—
"—" denotes releases that did not chart or were not released in that territory

=== Video albums ===
Year	Title	Details
2007	Born to Rock	Released: 26 November 2007; Label: Universal TV; Live material filmed at the London Palladium in May 2007

== EPs ==
Year	Title (Note: This is a list of EPs released in the UK. Various other EPs were released elsewhere.)	Details
1958	Presenting Marty Wilde	Released: March 1958; Label: Philips; With the Wildcats
1958	More of Marty	Released: September 1958; Label: Philips; With the Wildcats
1959	Sea of Love	Released: December 1959; Label: Philips
1960	The Versatile Mr Wilde	Released: October 1960; Label: Philips
1961	Marty Wilde Favourites	Released: March 1961; Label: Philips
1962	Come Running	Released: February 1962; Label: Philips
1963	Marty	Released: February 1963; Label: Philips
1978	Marty Wilde	Released: September 1978; Label: EMI

== Singles ==
Year	Title	Peak chart positions				Label
Year	Title	UK	AUS	NL	US	Label
1957	"Honeycomb" (with the Wildcats) b/w "Wild Cat"	—	—	—	—	Philips
1958	"Love Bug Crawl" (with the Wildcats) b/w "Afraid of Love"	—	—	—	—	Philips
1958	"Oh-Oh, I'm Falling In Love Again" (with the Wildcats) b/w "Sing, Boy, Sing"	—	—	—	—	Philips
1958	"Endless Sleep" (with the Wildcats) b/w "Her Hair Was Yellow"	4	—	—	—	Philips
1958	"My Lucky Love" (with the Wildcats) b/w "Misery's Child"	—	—	—	—	Philips
1958	"No One Knows" b/w "The Fire of Love"	—	—	—	—	Philips
1959	"Donna" b/w " Love-A Love-A Love-A"	3	—	—	—	Philips
1959	"A Teenager in Love" b/w "Danny"	2	—	—	—	Philips
1959	"Sea of Love" b/w "Teenage Tears"	3	—	—	—	Philips
1959	"Bad Boy" b/w It’s Been Nice" (UK) / "Teenage Tears" (US)	7	41	—	45	Philips
1960	"Johnny Rocco" b/w "My Heart and I"	30	—	—	—	Philips
1960	"The Fight" b/w "Johnny at the Crossroads"	47	—	—	—	Philips
1960	"Little Girl" b/w "Your Seventeenth Spring"	16	—	—	—	Philips
1960	"I Wanna Be Loved by You" b/w "Angry"	— (Note: "I Wanna Be Loved" did not chart on the Record Retailer chart, but the B-side, "Angry" did reach #25 on the NME chart.)	—	—	—	Philips
1960	"My Baby Is Gone (Stop This World)" (US and Canada-only release) b/w "Angry"	—	—	—	—	Epic
1960	"Amapola" (US promo-only release) b/w "Autumn Leaves"	—	—	—	—	Epic
1961	"Rubber Ball" b/w "Like Makin' Love"	9	—	—	—	Philips
1961	"When Does It Get to Be Love" b/w "Your Loving Touch"	—	—	—	—	Philips
1961	"Hide and Seek" b/w "Crazy Dream"	47	—	—	—	Philips
1961	"Tomorrow’s Clown" b/w "The Hellions"	33	—	—	—	Philips
1962	"Come Running" b/w "Ev'ryone"	—	—	—	—	Philips
1962	"Jezebel" b/w "Don’t Run Away"	19	—	—	—	Philips
1962	"Ever Since You Said Goodbye" b/w "Send Me the Pillow You Dream On"	31	—	—	—	Philips
1963	"Lonely Avenue" b/w "Brand New Love"	—	—	—	—	Columbia
1963	"No! Dance with Me" b/w "Little Miss Happiness"	—	—	—	—	Philips
1963	"Bless My Broken Heart" b/w "Save Your Love for Me"	—	—	—	—	Columbia
1964	"When Day Is Done" b/w "I Can't Help the Way That I Feel"	—	—	—	—	Columbia
1964	"Kiss Me" (with the Wild Cats) b/w "My, What a Woman"	—	—	—	—	Columbia
1964	"The Mexican Boy" b/w "Your Kind of Love"	—	—	—	—	Decca
1965	"Since You’ve Gone" (as part of the Wilde Three) b/w "Just as Long"	—	—	—	—	Decca
1965	"I Cried" (as part of the Wilde Three) b/w "Well Who’s That"	—	—	—	—	Decca
1966	"I've Got So Used to Loving You" b/w "The Beginning of the End"	—	—	—	—	Philips
1968	"By the Time I Get to Phoenix" b/w "Shutters and Boards"	56 (Note: Chart position is from the official UK "Breakers List".)	—	—	—	Philips
1968	"Abergavenny" (released in the US and Canada under the pseudonym Shannon) b/w "Alice in Blue"	—	8	6 (Note: "Abergavenny" was also successful in Belgium, peaking at number 6 on the Flanders chart and number 16 on the Wallonia chart.)	47	Philips
1968	"The World Stood Up" (France-only release) b/w "In the Night"	—	—	—	—	Philips
1969	"All the Love I Have" b/w "Any Day"	—	—	—	—	Philips
1969	"Shelley" b/w "Jump on the Train"	—	—	—	—	Philips
1969	"Jesamine" (as Shannon; US-only release) b/w "Lullaby"	—	—	—	—	Heritage
1969	"Mean Woman Blues" (France-only release) b/w "So Glad You’re Mine"	—	—	—	—	Philips
1970	"No Trams to Lime Street" b/w "A Prelude to Old Age"	—	—	—	—	Philips
1971	"The Busker" b/w "It’s So Unreal"	—	—	—	—	Philips
1972	"When You Wish Upon a Star" (as Scrumpy 'n' Dumpy) b/w "The Scrumpy 'n' Dumpy Boogaloo"	—	—	—	—	Famous
1973	"Caterpillar" (as Cold Fly) b/w "Yesterday Started for Judy"	—	—	—	—	Bus Stop
1973	"Rock and Roll Crazy" (as Zappo) b/w "Right On!"	—	—	—	—	Magnet
1973	"20 Fantastic Bands" (as the Dazzling All Night Rock Show) b/w "20 Fantastic Bands (Continued)"	—	—	—	—	Magnet
1974	"The Shang-a-Lang Song" (as Ruby Pearl and the Dreamboats) b/w "Will You Stop That!"	—	—	—	—	Magnet
1974	"All Night Girl" b/w "She's a Mover"	—	—	—	—	Magnet
1974	"I Love You" b/w "She's a Mover"	—	—	—	—	Magnet
1975	"Come Back & Love Me" (as Shannon) b/w "She’s a High Flyer"	—	—	—	—	Magnet
1982	"In Dreams" b/w " Hard to Find, Easy to Lose"	—	—	—	—	Kaleidoscope
1982	"Sea of Heartbreak" b/w " Don't Wanna Be the Ond"	—	—	—	—	Kaleidoscope
1991	"Sea of Love" (by Phil Phillips & the Twilights) b/w "Sea of Love" (by Marty Wilde)	100	—	—	—	Mercury
2007	"Sorry Seems to Be the Hardest Word" (featuring Kim Wilde; promo-only release)	—	—	—	—	Universal Music TV
2020	"Running Together" (featuring Kim Wilde)	—	—	—	—	Pushka
2020	"60's World"	—	—	—	—	Pushka
2020	"Christmas Fantasia" (with Roxanne Rizzo Wilde & Kim Wilde) b/w "Christmas All Over the World"	—	—	—	—	Pushka
"—" denotes releases that did not chart or were not released in that territory
