= List of songs recorded by Sinn Sisamouth =

More than 1,200 songs are listed below. Some of the songs are songs that Sinn Sisamouth composed and sang himself, or with Ros Serey Sothea or Pan Ron. Sinn Sisamouth has been featured on more than 250 Chlangden (remixed) albums, 158 Wat Phnom albums (originals), more than 90 Sayonara Sound albums(remixed), and more than 50 Original Master albums of Rasmey Pean Meas (originals) including various production albums of the 2000s.

== Solo performances ==
- "Just Want To See (ចង់ត្រឹមតែឃើញ)" [Album: Chlangden Vol. 038]
- "Sparrow Cries For Love (ចាបយំប្រាប់ស្នេហ៍ចាស់)"
- "Blood’s All Over My Hand (ឈាមប្រឡាក់ដៃខ្ញុំ)"
- "Your Name Is Like A Star (ឈ្នោះអូនដូចដួងតារា)"
- "My Heart Still Desires (ចិត្តនៅតែប្រាថ្នា)" [Album: Chlangden Vol. 113]
- "Treacherous Heart (ចិត្តផិតក្បត់)" [Album: Chlangden Vol. 113]
- "Number One Haircut (កាត់សក់ដៃឯក)"
- "Golden Sparrow (ចាបមាស)"
- "Diamond Ring (ចិញ្ចៀនពេជ្រណាអូន)"
- "Chak Chuch (ចាក់ជូច)" [Album: Chlangden Vol. 035]
- "Love Challenge (ចំណោទស្នេហា)" [Album: Chlangden Vol. 207]
- "Love Couple’s Song (ចម្រៀងគូស្នេហ៍)" [Album: Chlangden Vol. 026]
- "Wait Until The Next Life (ចាំជាតិក្រោយចុះ)" [Album: Chlangden Vol. 125]
- "Waiting To Meet At Every Sunsets (ចាំជួបរាល់ថ្ងៃលិច) [Album: Chlangden Vol. 285]
- "A Night Of Waiting (ចាំមួយរាត្រី)" [Album: Chlangden Vol. 021]
- "Smile Again (ចាំញញឹមសាជាថ្មី)" [Album: Chlangden Vol. 219]
- "Waiting For You Everyday (ចាំអូនរាលថ្ងៃ)" [Album: Chlangden Vol. 113]
- "Waiting Just For You (ចាំតែអ្នក)" [Album: Chlangden Vol. 071]
- "Answers Through The Air (ចម្លើយតាមខ្យល់)" [Album: Chlangden Vol. 032]
- "Gifted Bond (ចំណងនិស្ស័យ)" [Album: Chlangden Vol. 219]
- "Champa Banteay Daek (ចំប៉ាបន្ទាយដែក)" [Album: Chlangden Vol. 025]
- "Champa Battambang (ចំប៉ាបាត់ដំបង)" [Album: Chlangden Vol. 125]
- "Champa Kampong Prak (ចំប៉ាកំពង់ប្រាក់)" [Album: Chlangden Vol. 037]
- "Champey Siem Reap (ចំប៉ីសៀមរាប)" [Album: Chlangden Vol. 125]
- "Champey Suokea (ចំប៉ីសួគ៌ា)" [Album: Chlangden Vol. 064]
- "Unwritten Song (ចម្រៀងឥតព្រៀងទុក)" [Album: Chlangden Vol. 020]
- "A Song Without Lyrics (ចម្រៀងខ្វះទំនុក)" [Album: Chlangden Vol. 060]
- "Song of Death (ចម្រៀងមរណៈ)" [Album: Chlangden Vol. 051]
- "An Unfinished Song (ចម្រៀងមួយបទដែលតែងមិនចប់)" [Album: Chlangden Vol. 141]
- "My Song (ចម្រៀងរបស់បង)" [Album: Chlangden Vol. 061]
- "Song For You (ចម្រៀងសម្រាប់អូន)" [Album: Chlangden Vol. 113]
- "A Piece Of The Moon (ច័ន្ទមួយចំណិត)" [Album: Chlangden Vol. 003]
- "Moon Leaves The Sky (ច័ន្ទចាកមេឃ)" [Album: Chlangden Vol. 071]
- "Moon Rises On A Bus (ច័ន្ទរះលើរថយន្តក្រុង)" [Album: Chlangden Vol. 063]
- "The Moon Has Risen (ច័ន្ទ្រារះហើយ)" [Album: Chlangden Vol. 189]
- "Grandchild of Brahma (ចៅព្រាហ្ម)" [Album: Chlangden Vol. 020]
- "Chapey And My Friend (ចាប៉ីនិងមិត្តខ្ញុំ)" [Album: Chlangden Vol. 073]
- "Believe You’ll Be Back (ជឿជាក់ថាមុំវិលវិញ)" [Album: Chlangden Vol. 227]
- "ចិត្តបួស" [Album: Chlangden Vol. 111]
- "Hopeless Heart (ចិត្តឥតសង្ឃឹម)" [Album: Chlangden Vol. 071]
- "My Heart (ចិត្តខ្ញុំ)" [Album: Chlangden Vol. 185]
- "Edge Of The Purple Sky (ជើងមេឃពណ៌ស្វាយ)" [Album: Chlangden Vol. 049]
- "Done For A Life (ឆ្អែតមួយជីវិត)" [Album: Chlangden Vol. 003]
- "Cheut Cheut, Preut Preut (ឈើតៗ ព្រើតៗ)" [Album: Chlangden Vol. 055]
- "Stop Talking About Love (ឈប់និយាយពីរឿងស្នេហា)" [Album: Chlangden Vol. 127]
- "Tip Of The Pine (ចុងស្រល់)"
- "Ride On A Boat With Me (ជិះទូកលេងនឹងបង)" [Album: Chlangden Vol. 052]
- "Grandpa And Grandchild (ជីតានិងចៅ)" [Album: Chlangden Vol. 074]
- "My Life’s Just For You (ជីវិតខ្ញុំសម្រាប់តែអ្នក)" [Album: Chlangden Vol. 052]
- "Life Of A Fisherman (ជីវិតអ្នកនេសាទ)" [Album: Chlangden Vol. 030]
- "Life Of A Gem Worker (ជីវិតកម្មករត្បូង)" [Album: Chlangden Vol. 293]
- "One Life, Two Hearts (ជីវិតមួយបេះដូងពីរ)" [Album: Chlangden Vol. 293]
- "Life Of The World (ជីវិតសត្វលោក)" [Album: Chlangden Vol. 044]
- "Answer Me, Love (ឆ្លើយមកស្នេហា)" [Album: Chlangden Vol. 125]
- "Far From Love (ឆ្ងាយស្នេហា)" [Album: Chlangden Vol. 125]
- "Want To Be Born As Water (ចង់កើតជាទឹក)" [Album: Chlangden Vol. 003]
- "Wipe Your Tears, Darling (ជូតទឹកភ្នែកទៅអូន)" [Album: Chlangden Vol. 034]
- "Valley Of Golden Parrots (ជ្រលងសេកមាស)" [Album: Chlangden Vol. 075]
- "Love Camps (ជំរុំស្នេហា)" [Album: Chlangden Vol. 213]
- "Love Camps (ជំរុំស្នេហ៍)" [Album: Chlangden Vol. 293]
- "Meet By Accident (ជួបដោយចៃដន្យ)" [Album: Chlangden Vol. 189]
- "Meet For the Last Time On A Beach (ជួបគ្នាចុងក្រោយលើឆ្នេរខ្សាច់)" [Album: Chlangden Vol. 012]
- "Answer Me (ឆ្លើយចាសមកអូន)" [Album: Chlangden Vol. 285]

=== D ===
- Da Vy Meas Bong ដាវីមាសបង
- Derm Dong Tee10 ដើមដូងទីដប់
- Dorng steung Porthisat ដងស្ទឹងពោធិសាត់
- Dorng steung Sangker ដងស្ទឹងសង្កែ
- Dourng netra ដួងនេត្រា
- Daeum Dong Proloeng Sneh ដើមដូងព្រលឹងស្នេហ៌
- Dambav Duong Chet ដំបៅដួងចិត្ត
- Damrey Sor Chmol ដំរីសឈ្មោល
- Dantrei Snae តន្ត្រីស្នេហ៌
- Dara Knhom Euy តារាខ្ញុំអើយ
- Day Knong Day Pnék Knong Pnék ដៃក្នុងដៃភ្នែកក្នុងភ្នែក
- Decho Psarng Preng
- Doch Chea Prohêl Muk ដូចជាប្រហែលមុខ
- Domrey Sor Euy ដំរីសអើយ
- Duong Chan Duong Chet ដួងច័ន្ទដួងចិត្ត
- Duong Khê Rornoch ដួងខែរនោច

=== H ===
- Hêt Tê Kam Bong (Album: Chlangden Vol. 207)ហេតុតែកម្មបង
- Hoera Tos Teay (Album: Chlangden Vol. 085) ហោរាទស្សន៍ទាយ
- Hala Hala

=== J ===
- Jevit Sat Lok ជីវិតសត្វលោក
- Jevit khyum somrab nerk (My Life For You) ជីវិតខ្ញុំសំរាប់អ្នក
- Jaor Jett Jear (Album: Chlangden Vol. 130) ចោរចិត្តជា
- Jeevet Sob Tgnai (Album: Chlangden Vol. 211) ជីវិតសព្វថ្ងៃ

=== K ===
- Kandal dourng Chet កណ្ដាលដួងចិត្ត
- Keng Youl Angrung (Sleeping, Rocking the Hammock) ចាំជួបរាល់ថ្ងៃលិច (Waiting to see you every sunset)
- Kgropbeu Knong Teuk (Crocodile in Water) ក្រពើក្នុងទឹក
- Kheung Pruos Sralanh (I Am Angry Because I Love) ខឹងព្រោះស្រលាញ់
- Khoss Pruos Knhom ខុសព្រោះខ្ញុំ
- Klen Euy Kro Obe (Smell So Good), Bopha Leak Kluon (បុប្ផាលាក់ខ្លួន)៖ ក្រអូបតែក្លិនមិនបានឃើញខ្លួន......
- Kolap Batdambong (Rose of Battambong) កុលាបបាត់ដំបង
- Kolap Khmer Ahkas កុលាបខ្មែរអាកាសចរណ៍
- Kolap Mouy Tong (The One Rose) កុលាបមួយទង
- Kolap Pailin (Pailin Rose) កុលាបប៉ៃលិន
- Kolap Sor ផ្កាកុលាប ស
- Ka-êk Prot Bangkorng (Album: Chlangden Vol. 183) ក្អែកព្រាត់បង្គង
- Ka-ngok Kromom (Album: Chlangden Vol. 012) ក្ងោកក្រមុំ
- Kach Ey Kach Mless (Album: Chlangden Vol. 219) កាចអីកាចម្លេះ
- Keo Phnek Anub Soun (Album: Chlangden Vol. 165) កែវភ្នែកអាណុបសួន
- Kal Oun Neang Rom (Album: Chlangden Vol. 052) កាលអូននាងរាំ
- Kam Kay Min Tieng (Album: Chlangden Vol. 096) កម្មកាយមិនទៀង
- Kamlos Muoy Chivit Roe? (Album: Chlangden Vol. 201) កម្លោះមួយជីវិត
- Kampong Thom Chumrum Chet (Album: Chlangden Vol. 149) កំពង់ធំជំរំចិត្ត
- Kampot Kampoul Duong Chet (Album: Chlangden Vol. 125) កំពតកំពូលដួងចិត្ត
- Kamrorng Phuong Tkol (Album: Chlangden Vol. 037) កម្រងភួងថ្កុល
- Kamsart Kat Prey (Album: Chlangden Vol. 083) កម្សត់កាត់ព្រៃ
- Kandal Duong Chet (Album: Chlangden Vol. 207) កណ្ដាលដួងចិត្ត
- Kanseng Pak Pka (Album: Chlangden Vol. 030) កន្សែងប៉ាក់ផ្កា
- Kanseng Sladok (Album: Chlangden Vol. 032) កន្សែងស្លាដក់
- Kanseng Srey Pak (Album: Chlangden Vol. 032) កន្សែងស្រីប៉ាក់
- Kat Chet Tang Ah-lai (Album: Chlangden Vol. 100) កាត់ចិត្តទាំងអាល័យ
- Kcharng Kdark (Album: Chlangden Vol. 181) ខ្យងក្ដក់
- Kdech Chhoeu Nas Oun (Album: Chlangden Vol. 068) ក្ដិចឈឺណាស់អូន
- Keng Tov Keng Tov (Album: Chlangden Vol. 111) គេងទៅគេងទៅ
- Keo Sneha (Album: Chlangden Vol. 293) កន្សែងស្នេហា
- Kham Luoch Srarlanh (Album: Chlangden Vol. 205) ខំលួចស្រលាញ់
- Kham Te Choeur (Album: Chlangden Vol. 012) ខំតែជឿ
- Kheugn Min Ban (Album: Chlangden Vol. 095) ឃើញមិនបាន
- Kheunh Te Mouy (Album: Chlangden Vol. 059) ឃើញតែមួយ
- Khmum Pnhaeu Sambok (Album: Chlangden Vol. 117) ឃ្មុំផ្ញើសំបុក
- Khoch Chet Torte (Album: Chlangden Vol. 131) ខូចចិត្តទទេ
- Khoe Cheung Thom (Album: Chlangden Vol. 059) ខោជើងធំ
- Khoeng Chraeun Min Chamnenh (Album: Chlangden Vol. 201) ខឹងច្រើនមិនចំណេញ
- Khoeng Prors Srarlanh (Album: Chlangden Vol. 117) ខឹងព្រោះស្រលាញ់
- Khoeng Rieng Avey (Album: Chlangden Vol. 151) ខឹងរឿងអ្វី
- Khsê Chivit (Album: Chlangden Vol. 064) ខ្សែជីវិត
- King Kork Krart (Album: Chlangden Vol. 063) គីង្គក់ក្រត
- Kjol Samot (Album: Chlangden Vol. 185) ខ្យល់សមុទ្រ
- Kjol Tonle (Album: Chlangden Vol. 075) ខ្យល់ទន្លេ
- Kjong kdok Tirk Jun ខ្យងក្តក់ទឹកជន់
- Klach On Ban Ke (Album: Chlangden Vol. 131) ខ្លាចអូនបានគេ
- Klach Prorpon Doch Kla (Album: Chlangden Vol. 022) ខ្លាចប្រពន្ធដូចខ្លា
- Kleat 1 Tngay Nissay 1 Chnam (Album: Chlangden Vol. 031) ឃ្លាតមួយថ្ងៃនិស្ស័យមួយឆ្នាំ
- Kleat Teang Srolanh (Album: Chlangden Vol. 068) ឃ្លាតទាំងស្រលាញ់
- Klem Chann Srornos (Album: Chlangden Vol. 185) ខ្លឹមច័ន្ទស្រណោះ
- Klen Euy Klen Kluon (Album: Chlangden Vol. 070) ក្លិនអើយក្លិនខ្លួន
- Klen Kluon Nuon Srey (Album: Chlangden Vol. 011) ក្លិនខ្លួននួនស្រី
- Kleng Dach Kseh (Album: Chlangden Vol. 012) ខ្លែងដាច់ខ្សែ
- Kloch Chet (Album: Chlangden Vol. 041) ខ្លោចចិត្ត
- Kmao Sros (Album: Chlangden Vol. 022) ខ្មៅស្រស់
- Kmean Te Chet Kromom (Album: Chlangden Vol. 285) គ្មានទេចិត្តក្រមុំ
- Knhom Rorng Cham (Album: Chlangden Vol. 071) ខ្ញុំរង់ចាំ
- Knorng Phnom Anouksary (Album: Chlangden Vol. 213) ខ្នងភ្នំអនុស្សាវរីយ៍
- Ko Sneng Mouy (Album: Chlangden Vol. 024) គោស្នែងមួយ
- Koh-Prak-An-Teak-Sneh (Album: Chlangden Vol. 003) កោះប្រាក់អន្ទាក់ស្នេហ៍
- Koh Chas Koh Thmei Srei Prê Chet (Album: Chlangden Vol. 061) កោះចាស់កោះថ្មីស្រីប្រែចិត្ត
- Kolab Chroy Ta Prum (Album: Chlangden Vol. 005) កុលាបជ្រោយតាព្រហ្ម
- Kolab Daunteav (Album: Chlangden Vol. 061) កុលាបដូនទាវ
- Kolab Meas Barng (Album: Chlangden Vol. 036) កុលាបមាសបង
- Kolab Muoy Torng (Album: Chlangden Vol. 139) កុលាបមួយទង
- Kolab Pailin (Album: Chlangden Vol. 070) កុលាបប៉ៃលិន
- Kolab Prek Leab (Album: Chlangden Vol. 004) កុលាបព្រែកលៀប
- Kolarp Khmer Akkasjor (Album: Chlangden Vol. 165) កុលាបខ្មែរអាកាសចរណ៍
- Kom Khoeng Ey Oun (Album: Chlangden Vol. 052) កុំខឹងអីអូន
- Kom Ngor Pék On (Album: Chlangden Vol. 060) កុំងពេកអូន
- Kom Plich Bandam (Album: Chlangden Vol. 076) កុំភ្លេចបណ្ដាំ
- Kom Soeuch Dak Knhom (Album: Chlangden Vol. 024) កុំសើចដាក់ខ្ញុំ
- Kom Tam Bong Ey (Album: Chlangden Vol. 054) កុំតាមបងអី
- Kom Tar Leah Heuy (Album: Chlangden Vol. 165) កុំថាលាហើយ
- Kompoul Pnom Dong Rek (Album: Chlangden Vol. 136) កំពូលភ្នំដងរែក
- Komrong Pka Phuong (Album: Chlangden Vol. 002) កម្រងផ្កាភួង
- Kopeu Knong Toeuk (Album: Chlangden Vol. 097) ក្រពើក្នុងទឹក
- Korng Kam Korng Keo (Album: Chlangden Vol. 207) កងកម្មកងកែវ
- Krarmom Chhaô Laô (Album: Chlangden Vol. 055) ក្រមុំឆោឡោ
- Krobey Het Gny (Album: Chlangden Vol. 035) ក្របីហិតញី
- Krou Kmeng Tnam Chnang (Album: Chlangden Vol. 033) គ្រូក្មេងថ្នាំឆ្នាំង
- Ku Snae Leu Neavea (Album: Chlangden Vol. 004) គូស្នេហ៍លើនាវា
- Kuk 1 Chivit (Album: Chlangden Vol. 149) គុកមួយជិវិត
- Kumnum 20 Chnam (Album: Chlangden Vol. 191) គំនុំ ២០ ឆ្នាំ
- Kyol Chop Bok Mork Tiet (Album: Chlangden Vol. 130) ខ្យល់ឈប់បក់មកទៀត

=== L ===
- Lmorm heuy na srey (Enough Already) ល្មមហើយណាស្រី
- La-or Et Tars (Album: Chlangden Vol. 201) ល្អឥតទាស់
- "Lan ""Decapotab" (Album: Chlangden Vol. 042) ឡានដេកាប៉ូតាប
- Lan Chak Toek (Album: Chlangden Vol. 059) ឡានចាក់ទឹក
- Lav Loek (Album: Chlangden Vol. 123) ឡាវឡឹក (ស្រីលាវតូច)
- Lea Hoeuy Paris (Album: Chlangden Vol. 171) លាហើយប៉ារីស
- Lea Hoeuy Sor Kolab (Album: Chlangden Vol. 031) លាហើយសកុលាប
- Lea Oun Tov Cbang (Album: Chlangden Vol. 191) លាអូនទៅច្បាំង
- Lea Phum Seksark (Album: Chlangden Vol. 004) លាភូមិសេកសក
- Lea Phum Séksork (Album: Chlangden Vol. 062) លាភូមិសេកសក
- Lea Stoeung Sangke (Album: Chlangden Vol. 032) លាស្ទឹងសង្កែ
- Leakhena Meas Barng (Album: Chlangden Vol. 096) លក្ខិណាមាសបង
- Lear-Srey-Sa-Va (Album: Chlangden Vol. 003) លាស្រីសាវ៉ា
- Leng Tê Kham (Album: Chlangden Vol. 016) លេងតែខាំ
- Leu Phnom Tronum Kaêk (Album: Chlangden Vol. 044) លាភ្នំទ្រនំក្អែក
- Lingchou Meas Barng (Album: Chlangden Vol. 117) លីនជូមាសបង (លិញជូមាសបង)
- Lmorm-Houy-Na-Srey (Album: Chlangden Vol. 003) ល្មមហើយណាស្រី
- Loeung Rom Ban Teh? (Album: Chlangden Vol. 028) ឡើងរាំបានទេ?
- Lous Lorng Krom Thorony (Album: Chlangden Vol. 075) លុះលង់ក្រោមធរណី
- Luoch Sneh Luoch Tuk (Album: Chlangden Vol. 073) លួចស្នេហ៍លួចទុក្ខ
- Luoch Sneh Luoch Tuk (Album: Chlangden Vol. 097) លួចស្នេហ៍លួចទុក្ខ
- Luoch Srolanh (Album: Chlangden Vol. 219) លួចស្រលាញ់

=== M ===
- Mae Ouy Owe Youn* ម៉ែឲ្យអាវយ័ន្ត
- Mlob poh bak khaing ម្លប់ពោធិ៍បាក់ខែង
- Marina ម៉ារីណា
- Mala Meas Bong (Mala My Love) ម៉ាឡាមាសបង
- Meas Teuk Prambei (Impure Gold) a.k.a. Smaan Tae Niw Gramom (Thought She Was Still a Maiden) មាសទឹកប្រាំបី ឬ ស្មានតែនូវក្រមុំ
- Meul Teuk Samotr (Looking at the Water of the Ocean) មើលទឹកសមុទ្រ(ខ្យល់សមុទ្រ)
- Msel Menh (Yesterday) ម្សិលម៉ិញ
- Maok Py Na Neang (Album: Chlangden Vol. 086) មកពីណានាង
- MARINA (Album: Chlangden Vol. 213) ម៉ារីណា
- Maung 3 Yub Ming (Album: Chlangden Vol. 135) ម៉ោងបីយប់ម៉ិញ
- Mchas Klen Nov Ti Na? (Album: Chlangden Vol. 187) ម្ចាស់ក្លិននៅទីណា?
- Mean Prak Mean Sneh (Album: Chlangden Vol. 127) មានប្រាក់មានស្នេហ៍
- Mean Rieng Avey Tov (Album: Chlangden Vol. 044) មានរឿងអ្វីទៅ
- Mean Sneh Mean Luy (Album: Chlangden Vol. 025) មានស្នេហ៍មានលុយ
- Meas Toek 8 (Album: Chlangden Vol. 007) មាសទឹក ៨
- Meas Toeuk 10 (Album: Chlangden Vol. 123) មាសទឹក ១០
- Mék Kpors Dei Teab (Album: Chlangden Vol. 027) មេឃខ្ពស់ដីទាប
- Mek Ning Dey (Album: Chlangden Vol. 071) មេឃនិងដី
- Memay 1 Pleung (Album: Chlangden Vol. 068) ម៉េម៉ាយមួយភ្លើង
- Mén Roe Min Mén (Album: Chlangden Vol. 139) មែនឬមិនមែន
- Meul Kun Té On (Album: Chlangden Vol. 039) មើលកុនទេអូន
- Meul Mek Meul Srey (Album: Chlangden Vol. 123) មើលមេឃមើលស្រី
- Meul Min Thlous (Album: Chlangden Vol. 012) មើលមិនធ្លុះ
- Meul Pnek Knhom Kheugn Chet Knhom (Album: Chlangden Vol. 095) មើលភ្នែកខ្ញុំឃើញចិត្តខ្ញុំ
- Min Chang Mean Tngay Sa-ek (Album: Chlangden Vol. 185) មិនចង់មានថ្ងៃស្អែក
- Min Leng Té Prarporn (Album: Chlangden Vol. 060) មិនលែងទេប្រពន្ធ
- Min Plich Bandam (Album: Chlangden Vol. 113) មិនភ្លេចបណ្ដាំ
- Min Plich Roy Thoeub (Album: Chlangden Vol. 135) មិនភ្លេចរយថើប
- Min Yol (Album: Chlangden Vol. 213) មិនយល់
- MIRA Meas Bong (Album: Chlangden Vol. 213) មីរ៉ាមាសបង
- Mjas Dav Kaysith (Album: Chlangden Vol. 031) ម្ចាស់ដាវកាយសិទ្ធ
- Mlis Lea Chak Torng (Album: Chlangden Vol. 063) ម្លិះលាចាកទង
- Mlis Ruot Phum Thmei (Album: Chlangden Vol. 027) ម្លិះរួតភូមិថ្មី
- Mlub Dong Ty 10 (Album: Chlangden Vol. 043) ម្លប់ដូងទី១០
- Mlub Po Bakheng (Album: Chlangden Vol. 073) ម្លប់ពោធិ៍បាក់ខែង (ចំណងជើងកាស្សែតសម័យដើម ផលិតកម្ម សេះមាស លេខ ៥៥០២ រាំវង់ឆ្នាំថ្មី ដាក់ថា ពោធិ៍បាក់ខែង )
- Mok Rom Ning Knhom (Album: Chlangden Vol. 052) មករាំនឹងខ្ញុំ
- Mom Meas Sneh* (Album: Chlangden Vol. 211) ម៉ុមមាសស្នេហ៍
- Morn Sneh Srei Kmao (Album: Chlangden Vol. 039) មន្តស្នេហ៍ស្រីខ្មៅ
- Mun Neung Kleat Kay មុននឹងឃ្លាតកាយ
- Muny Khemara Akasayean (Album: Chlangden Vol. 064) មុនីខេមរាអាកាសយាន្ត
- Muoy Meun Alay (Album: Chlangden Vol. 076) (Ten Thousand Passions) មួយម៉ឺនអាល័យ

=== N ===
- Neagk Na Min Snaeha (sugar sugar) អ្នកណាមិនស្នេហា
- Neary chnam 72 (1972 Girl) នារីឆ្នាំំ ៧២
- Neary Boroteh នារីបរទេសឬ
- Neuk Oun Chearnich (I will always miss you) នឹកអូនជានិច្ច
- Nevei Jevit នាវាជីវិត
- Nisay Sne Srey Krob Leak និស្ស័យស្នេហ៍ស្រីគ្រប់លក្ខណ៍
- Neak Kat Sork Day Ek (Album: Chlangden Vol. 055) កាត់សក់ដៃឯក
- Neak Na Min Noek Oun (Album: Chlangden Vol. 127) នាក់ណាមិននឹកអូន
- Neakna Kmean Snae (Album: Chlangden Vol. 131) នាក់ណាគ្មានស្នេហ៍
- Neang Ang Roub Roe? (Album: Chlangden Vol. 025) នាងអាងរូបឬ?
- Neang Karch Taer Onchoeng (Album: Chlangden Vol. 130) នាងកាចតែអញ្ចឹង
- Neang Kor Kar Srarlanh (Album: Chlangden Vol. 129) នាងគក៏ស្រឡាញ់
- Neary Borotés Roe? (Album: Chlangden Vol. 054) នារីបរទេសឬ?
- Neknah Oy Ku? (Album: Chlangden Vol. 002) អ្នកណាឲ្យគូរ?
- Nhonhim Nhonhim (Album: Chlangden Vol. 293) ញញឹមញញឹម
- Nissay Krub Leak (Album: Chlangden Vol. 075) និស្ស័យគ្រប់លក្ខណ៍
- Nochek (Album: Chlangden Vol. 028)
- Noek Khoenh Teang Ars (Album: Chlangden Vol. 010) នឹកឃើញទាំងអស់
- Noek Krub Velea (Album: Chlangden Vol. 183) នឹកគ្រប់វេលា
- Noeuk Kheugn Noeuk Kheugn! (Album: Chlangden Vol. 034) នឹកឃើញនឹកឃើញ
- Nov Te Sday (Album: Chlangden Vol. 131) នៅតែស្ដាយ
- Nuv Smak Nuv Sday (Album: Chlangden Vol. 165) នៅស័្មគ្រនៅស្ដាយ

=== O ===
- Oh oh yeh yeh — song by Sinn Sisamouth containing a chorus in English អូ.អូ.យេ.យេ
- On srey On (On, the Woman, On)* អនអើយស្រីអន
- Oun mok pee na? (Honey, When Did You Come?) អូនមកពីណា?
- Odom Duong Chet (Album: Chlangden Vol. 004) ឧត្ដមដួងចិត្ត
- Oh! Dalé (Album: Chlangden Vol. 171) អូ!ដាឡេ
- Oh! Sneh Euy (Album: Chlangden Vol. 046) អូ! ស្នេហ៍អើយ
- OH! YE YE (Album: Chlangden Vol. 071) English version? អូ! យេយេ
- On Euy Srey On (Album: Chlangden Vol. 021) អនអើយស្រីអន
- On Kon Neak Na? (Album: Chlangden Vol. 006) អូនកូននាក់ណា?
- On Plech Reuang Daeum (Album: Chlangden Vol. 036) អូនភ្លេចរឿងដើម
- Ork Boeung Kanseng (Album: Chlangden Vol. 073) អកបឹងកន្សែង
- Oronor Nuon Euy (Album: Chlangden Vol. 197) ឱ!រណ៎នួនអើយ
- Os Prak Os Sneh (Album: Chlangden Vol. 127) អស់ប្រាក់អស់ស្នេហ៍
- Oun Euy Meaul Pkay (Album: Chlangden Vol. 171) អូនអើយមើលផ្កាយ
- Oun Kong Doeung Kluon (Album: Chlangden Vol. 038) អូនគង់ដឹងខ្លួន
- Oun Laôr Doch Pka (Album: Chlangden Vol. 035) អូនល្អដួចផ្កា
- Oun Yum Rieng Avey? (Album: Chlangden Vol. 068) អូនយំរឿងអ្វី?
- Oy Plich Mdech Ban (Album: Chlangden Vol. 035) អើយភ្លេចម្ដេចបាន

=== P ===
- Pailin Soben Snae (Pailin Dream of Love) ប៉ៃលិនសុបិន្តស្នេហ៍
- Pél dèl trov yom ពេលដែលត្រូវយំ
- Pkai Proeuk (Morning Star) ផ្កាយព្រឹក
- Phap Samnarng ភ័ព្វសំណាង
- Pleng Machareach ភ្លេងមច្ចុរាជ
- Prek Eng Ors Songkhem ព្រែកឯងអស់សង្ឃឹម
- Prort snae bandol chet ព្រាត់ស្នេហ៍បានដល់ចិត្ត
- Pailin Prorloeng Sneh (Album: Chlangden Vol. 061) ប៉ៃលិនព្រលឹងស្នេហ៍
- Pailin Soben Sneh (Album: Chlangden Vol. 027) ប៉ៃលិនសុបិន្តស្នេហ៍
- Panh-cha Por K-uod Chheam (Album: Chlangden Vol. 147) បញ្ចពណ៌ក្អួតឈាម
- Peak Oun Saniya (Album: Chlangden Vol. 207) ពាក្យអូនសន្យា
- Pel Oun Kleat (Album: Chlangden Vol. 052) ពេលអូនឃ្លាត
- Pél Oun Loeung Yunhos (Album: Chlangden Vol. 034) ពេលអូនឡើងយន្តហោះ
- Pel Plieng Neang Tov Na? (Album: Chlangden Vol. 006) ពេលភ្លៀងនាងទៅណា?
- Phat Cheay (Album: Chlangden Vol. 089) ផាត់ជាយ
- Phatcheay Bandol Chet (Album: Chlangden Vol. 103) ផាត់ជាយបណ្ដូលចិត្ត
- Pheak Reyear Py ភរិយា ពីរ
- Phnom Sampov Chumrov Duong Chet (Album: Chlangden Vol. 060) ភ្នំសំពៅជម្រៅដួងចិត្ត
- Phsorng Kaeut Chea Toek (Album: Chlangden Vol. 063) ផ្សងកើតជាទឹក
- Phumphuong Samay (Album: Chlangden Vol. 037) ភុំភួងសម័យ
- Piphup Sneh Knhom (Album: Chlangden Vol. 149) ពិភពស្នេហ៍ខ្ញុំ
- Pjoer Pran Leu Pka Chhouk Sor (Album: Chlangden Vol. 141) ផ្ញើប្រាណលើផ្កាឈូកស
- Pjous Chivit (Album: Chlangden Vol. 033) ផ្យុះជីវិត
- Pka Kampuchea (Album: Chlangden Vol. 007) ផ្កាកម្ពុជា
- Pka Knong Rorbong (Album: Chlangden Vol. 211) ផ្កាក្នុងរបង
- Pka Krarpum Chak Torng (Album: Chlangden Vol. 010) ផ្កាក្រពុំចាកទង
- Pka Rich Bang Sloek (Album: Chlangden Vol. 027) ផ្ការីកបាំងស្លឹក
- Pka Rich Knong Chet (Album: Chlangden Vol. 028) ផ្ការីកក្នុងចិត្ត
- Pkay Preah Angkea (Album: Chlangden Vol. 046) ផ្កាយព្រះអង្គារ
- Pkay Proek (Album: Chlangden Vol. 070) ផ្កាយព្រឹក
- Pkay Sneha (Album: Chlangden Vol. 213) ផ្កាយស្នេហា
- Pkor Euy Kom Tngo (Album: Chlangden Vol. 042) ផ្គរអើយកុំថ្ងូរ
- Pleng Majureach (Album: Chlangden Vol. 049) ភ្លេងមច្ចុរាជ
- Plich Heuy Rer (Album: Chlangden Vol. 135) ភ្លេចហើយឬ?
- Plieng Kmean Rordov (Album: Chlangden Vol. 131) ភ្លៀងគ្មានរដូវ
- Plieng Srork Nov Mot Bang-orch (Album: Chlangden Vol. 071) ភ្លៀងស្រក់នៅមាត់បង្អួច
- Pnek Khoch (Album: Chlangden Vol. 041) ភ្នែកខួច
- Pnek On Mean Avei? (Album: Chlangden Vol. 131) ភ្នែកអូនមានអ្វី?
- Porl To Aphop (Album: Chlangden Vol. 145) ពលទោលអភ័ព្វ
- Pors May Khan Sla (Album: Chlangden Vol. 039) ពោះម៉ាយខាន់ស្លា
- Porsmay Hoeu Ha (Album: Chlangden Vol. 037) ពោះម៉ាយហ៊ឺហា
- Prab Bong Ban Te (Album: Chlangden Vol. 033) ប្រាប់បងបានទេ?
- Prarvas Srê Mdarng (Album: Chlangden Vol. 027) ប្រវាស់ស្រែម្ដង
- Praryat Pie Chlarng (Album: Chlangden Vol. 117) ប្រយ័ត្នពៀរឆ្លង
- Preah Chan Reas Hoeuy (Album: Chlangden Vol. 095) ព្រះច័ន្ទរះហើយ
- Prek Eng Os Sangkhoeum (Album: Chlangden Vol. 038) ព្រែកឯងអស់សង្ឃឹម
- Pril Pnek Os Hoeuy (Album: Chlangden Vol. 020) ព្រិលភ្នែកអស់ហើយ
- Prorm Ram Roe Tae (Album: Chlangden Vol. 139) ព្រមរាំឬទេ?
- Prors Tê On (Album: Chlangden Vol. 117) ព្រោះតែអូន
- Pros Bong Tlorb Srarlanh On (Album: Chlangden Vol. 183) ប្រុងបងធ្លាប់ស្រលាញ់អូន
- Pros Na Tram Ban (Album: Chlangden Vol. 205) ប្រុសណាទ្រាំបាន
- Prot Phnom Sampov (Album: Chlangden Vol. 032) ព្រាត់ភ្នំសំពៅ
- Prot Tiang Srolanh (Album: Chlangden Vol. 127) ព្រាត់ទាំងស្រលាញ់
- Prouy Robos Bong (Album: Chlangden Vol. 034) ព្រួយរបស់បង
- Proyat Pdey Leng (Album: Chlangden Vol. 022) ប្រយ័ត្នប្ដីលេង
- Puon Bong Dol Na (Album: Chlangden Vol. 011) ពួនបងដល់ណា

=== R ===
- Ram Changvak ROCK (Album: Chlangden Vol. 054) រាំចង្វាក់ ROCK
- Ram SURPRISE PARTY (Album: Chlangden Vol. 062)
- Reahou Chab Chan (Album: Chlangden Vol. 111) រាហ៊ូចាប់ច័ន្ទ
- Ream Kham Sror Mai រៀមខំស្រមៃ
- Reang Euy Reang Ré (Album: Chlangden Vol. 027) រាំងអើយរាំងរេ
- Reasmei Kdei Sangkhoem (Album: Chlangden Vol. 082) រស្មីក្ដីសង្ឃឹម
- Reatrei Chuob Sneh (Album: Chlangden Vol. 030) រាត្រីជួបស្នេហ៍
- Reatrey Del Knhom Cham Min Plich (Album: Chlangden Vol. 111) រាត្រីដែលខ្ញុំចាំមិនភ្លេច
- Reatrey HONG KONG (Album: Chlangden Vol. 071) រាត្រីហុងកុង
- Reatrey Nat Chuob (Album: Chlangden Vol. 187) រាត្រីណាត់ជួប
- Rey Euy Kum Yum រៃអើយកុំយំ
- Riem Cbarng Yeung (Album: Chlangden Vol. 096) រៀមច្បងយើង
- Roeu Mouy Oun Khoeung (Album: Chlangden Vol. 285) ឬមួយអូនខឹង
- Rom A Go Go (Album: Chlangden Vol. 189) រាំអា ហ្គោហ្គោ
- Rom ROCK (Album: Chlangden Vol. 028) រាំRock
- Rom Saravann (Album: Chlangden Vol. 020) រាំសារ៉ាវ៉ាន់
- Rom Tam Chet Smak (Album: Chlangden Vol. 097) រាំតាមចិត្តស្ម័គ្រ
- Romdourl dorng steung Sangker (Flower of the River Sangker) រំដួលដងស្ទឹងសង្កែ
- Romdourl Pothisat (Flower of Pursat) រំដួលពោធិ៍សាត់
- Romdourl Kok Kong រំដួលកោះកុង
- Romdourl Kratier (Flower of Kratier) រំដួលក្រចេះ
- Romdourl Sorin រំដួលសុរិន្ទ
- Roseal Kong Phnom រសៀលគងភ្នំ
- Rong Cham Knong Pel Romvong រង់ចាំក្នុងពេលរាំវង់
- Romvong Knong Pel Reatrey (Album: Chlangden Vol. 071) រាំវង់ក្នុងពេលរាត្រី
- Rorng Cham Tngay Sa-ek (Album: Chlangden Vol. 085) រង់ចាំថ្ងៃស្អែក
- Rorsat Tam Kyol (Album: Chlangden Vol. 137) រសាត់តាមខ្យល់
- Rory Chnam Kar Cham Dê (Album: Chlangden Vol. 203) រយឆ្នាំក៏ចាំដែរ
- Ros Cham Chamloeuy (Album: Chlangden Vol. 068) រស់ចាំចម្លើយ
- Rosoeub Nas (Album: Chlangden Vol. 055) រសើបណាស់
- Rub Srei Chea Duong Chet Bong (Album: Chlangden Vol. 203) រូបស្រីជាដួងចិត្តបង
- Rumduol Angkor (Album: Chlangden Vol. 071) រំដួលអង្គរ
- Rumduol Dorng Stoeng Siem Reap (Album: Chlangden Vol. 063) រំដួលដងស្ទឹងសៀមរាប
- Rumduol Kropum (Album: Chlangden Vol. 037) រំដួលក្រពុំ
- Rumduol Pursat (Album: Chlangden Vol. 085) រំដួលពោធិ៍សាត់
- Rumduol Sroeng Sangkê (Album: Chlangden Vol. 005) រំដួលស្ទឹងសង្កែ
- Roth Plerng Artreath Khleat Songsa: រថភ្លើងអាធ្រាតឃ្លាតសង្សា

=== S ===
- Samotr ream សមុទ្ររាម
- Sangkhim Cheanich (Hoping Forever) សង្ឃឹមជានិច្ច
- Snae ney yoeung (Our love) ស្នេហ៍ នៃយើង
- Snae Borisoth (Pure Love) ស្នេហ៍បរិសុទ្ធ
- Soben 3 Yuop សុបិនបីយប់
- Sony Agogo សូនីអាហ្គោ ហ្គោ
- Sony សូនី
- Sopheap boroh សុភាពបុរស
- Soriya reap lich សូរិយារៀបលិច
- Soriya Ors Sdongkut សូរិយាអស្ដង្គត
- Soriya Psong snae from the movie "Pos Keng Kang" សុរិយាផ្សងស្នេហ៍
- Spean Cheu Aphorp ស្ពានឈើអភ័ព្វ
- Sroèm Dong Stung Sonkgae ស្រអែមដងស្ទឹងសង្កែ
- Stoeung Keo ស្ទឹងកែវ
- Stoeung Sangker Kom Praeh jet tmey (River Sangker, Don't Change Your Mind) ស្ទឹងសង្កែកុំប្រែចិត្តថ្មី
- Sa-ek Knhom Mean Prorpon (Album: Chlangden Vol. 029) ស្អែកខ្ញុំមានប្រពន្ធ
- Sa-ek Lea Meh Chole Tveu Teahean (Album: Chlangden Vol. 191) ស្អែកលាម៉ែចូលធ្វើទាហាន
- Saen Sday Tpol Sdam (Album: Chlangden Vol. 147) សែនស្ដាយថ្ពាល់ស្ដាំ
- Sam Kmean Toah (Album: Chlangden Vol. 082) សមគ្មានទាស់
- Sambot Bong Muoy (Album: Chlangden Vol. 005) សំបុត្របងមួយ
- Sambot Chong Kraoy (Album: Chlangden Vol. 183) សំបុត្រចុងក្រោយ
- Sambot Muk Preah (Album: Chlangden Vol. 034) សម្បថមុខព្រះ
- Samdei Min Tieng (Album: Chlangden Vol. 030) សំដីមិនទៀង
- Samleng Khum Rong (Album: Chlangden Vol. 041) សំឡេងឃុំរោង
- Samleng Skor Dai Ek (Album: Chlangden Vol. 095) សំឡេងស្គរដៃឯក
- Samleng Tavao Pel Os Sdarngkort (Album: Chlangden Vol. 030) សំឡេងតាវ៉ៅពេលអស្ដង្គត
- Samnaeuch Cham-ark Prumlikhet (Album: Chlangden Vol. 211) សំណើចចំអកព្រហ្មលិខិត
- Samnau Kakei (Album: Chlangden Vol. 082) សំណៅកាកី
- Samnob Chet (Album: Chlangden Vol. 037) សំណប់ចិត្ត
- Samot Toek Pnek (Album: Chlangden Vol. 111) សមុទ្រទឹកភ្នែក
- Samrars Krarmom Phum Tkol (Album: Chlangden Vol. 004) សម្រស់ក្រមុំភូមិថ្កុល
- Samrars Seda Koh Thmei (Album: Chlangden Vol. 027) សម្រស់សេដាកោះថ្មី
- Samrek Chheam Khmer (Album: Chlangden Vol. 191) សម្រែកឈាមខ្មែរ
- Samros Bopha (Album: Chlangden Vol. 113) សម្រស់បុប្ផា
- Samros Koh Kong (Album: Chlangden Vol. 028) សម្រស់កោះកុង
- Samros Neang Chev Touk Dor (Album: Chlangden Vol. 043) សម្រស់នាងចែវទូក ដ
- Samros Neary Samay 72 (Album: Chlangden Vol. 129) សម្រស់នារីសម័យ ៧២
- Sang Pnuos Chos Oun (Album: Chlangden Vol. 123) សាងផ្នួសចុះអូន
- Sangkhim Roeu Kmean Sangkhim (Album: Chlangden Vol. 149) សង្ឃឹមឬគ្មានសង្ឃឹម
- Sangsa Samlarnh Chet (Album: Chlangden Vol. 117) សង្សាសម្លាញ់ចិត្ត
- Saniya 3 Tngay (Album: Chlangden Vol. 149) សន្យាបីថ្ងៃ
- Sankhim Chong Kroy (Album: Chlangden Vol. 293) សង្ឃឹមចុងក្រោយ
- Sark Veng Anlay (Album: Chlangden Vol. 070) សក់វែងអន្លាយ
- Sayon Toch Yum (Album: Chlangden Vol. 103) សាយណ្ហទោចយំ
- Sdab So Rohut Toek (Album: Chlangden Vol. 185) ស្ដាប់សូររហាត់ទឹក
- Sdab So Toek Plieng (Album: Chlangden Vol. 071) ស្ដាប់សូរទឹកភ្លៀង
- Sday-Riang-Own-Nass (Album: Chlangden Vol. 003) ស្ដាយរាងអូនណាស់
- Sday Chet Del Kham Reaksa (Album: Chlangden Vol. 051) ស្ដាយចិត្តដែលខំរក្សា
- Sday Chhom (Album: Chlangden Vol. 097) ស្ដាយឆោម
- Sday Chit Del Smos (Album: Chlangden Vol. 059) ស្ដាយចិត្តដែលស្មោះ
- Sday Chumnoun Choun Mê Tov Sdei (Album: Chlangden Vol. 060) ស្ដាយជំនួនជូនម៉ែទៅស្ដី
- Sday Duong Dara (Album: Chlangden Vol. 071) ស្ដាយដួងតារា
- Sday Klen Del Kleat (Album: Chlangden Vol. 006) ស្ដាយក្លិនដែលឃ្លាត
- Sday Snaeh Aphorp (Album: Chlangden Vol. 134) ស្ដាយស្នេហ៍អភ័ព្វ
- Sday Vey Komlos (Album: Chlangden Vol. 011) ស្ដាយវ័យកម្លោះ
- Sen Kror-ob (Album: Chlangden Vol. 032) សែនក្រអូប
- Sen Srolanh (Album: Chlangden Vol. 071) សែនស្រលាញ់
- Skov âu Mal Tich (Album: Chlangden Vol. 042) ស្កូវឱម៉ាល់ទិច
- Slab Ning Anouksavry (Album: Chlangden Vol. 185) ស្លាប់នឹងអនុស្សាវរីយ៍
- Slab Rors Tê Mdorng (Album: Chlangden Vol. 145) ស្លាប់រស់តែម្ដង
- Sloek Chheu Chak Mek (Album: Chlangden Vol. 038) ស្លឹកឈឺចាកមែក
- Smân Chet Min Trov (Album: Chlangden Vol. 125) ស្មានចិត្តមិនត្រូវ
- Smaong Euy Srei Smaong (Album: Chlangden Vol. 089) ស្មោងអើយស្រីស្មោង
- Smos Ponoeung Hoeuy (Album: Chlangden Vol. 058) ស្មោះប៉ុណ្ណឹងហើយ
- Snae Srei Srok Obun (Album: Chlangden Vol. 082) ស្នេហ៍ស្រីស្រុកអ៊ូបុន
- Snae Srei Te Mneak (Album: Chlangden Vol. 004) ស្នេហ៍តែម្នាក់
- Snaeh Jou Prap Tah Snaeh (Album: Chlangden Vol. 134)
- Sne-Ott-Ney (Album: Chlangden Vol. 003) ស្នេហ៍អត់ន័យ
- Sneh Bat Samros (Album: Chlangden Vol. 019) ស្នេហ៍បាត់សម្រស់
- Sneh Borisot (Album: Chlangden Vol. 002) ស្នេហ៍បរិសុទ្ធ
- Sneha Maktheung (Album: Chlangden Vol. 004) ស្នេហាម៉ាក់ថឺង
- Soben 3 Yub (Album: Chlangden Vol. 029) សុបិនបីយប់
- Soben Chamlek (Album: Chlangden Vol. 025) សុបិនចម្លែក
- Soben Kheugn Oun (Album: Chlangden Vol. 171) សុបិនឃើញអូន
- Sok-Krorng (Album: Chlangden Vol. 003) សក់ក្រង
- Sok Veng Mless? (Album: Chlangden Vol. 029) សក់វែងម្ល៉េះ
- Som Chuob Trem Cheat Noeng (Album: Chlangden Vol. 038) សុំជួបត្រឹមជាតិហ្នឹង
- Som On Meta Bopha Kampong Som (Album: Chlangden Vol. 061) សូមអូនមេត្តាបុប្ផាកំពង់សោម
- Som Pteas On Chrork (Album: Chlangden Vol. 027) សុំផ្ទះអូនជ្រក
- Som Rom Cheamuoy Phorng (Album: Chlangden Vol. 055) សុំរាំជាមួយផង
- Som Thort Rub Muoy Na Neang (Album: Chlangden Vol. 039) សុំថតរូបមួយណានាង
- Som Tnorm Prolom Tuk (Album: Chlangden Vol. 031) សុំថ្នមប្រលោមទុក
- Sontouch Ot Nuy (Album: Chlangden Vol. 083) សន្ទួចអត់នុយ
- Sony Bandol Sneh (Album: Chlangden Vol. 062) Sony បណ្ដូលស្នេហ៍
- Sopheap Boros Ches Dal (Album: Chlangden Vol. 022) សុភាពបុរសចេះដាល់
- Soriya Kampong Prak (Album: Chlangden Vol. 064) សុរិយាកំពង់ប្រាក់
- Soriya Lngeach Tngay (Album: Chlangden Vol. 103) សុរិយាល្ងាចថ្ងៃ
- Soriya Psorng Sneh (Album: Chlangden Vol. 073) សុរិយាផ្សងស្នេហ៍
- Soriya Rieb Lich (Album: Chlangden Vol. 070) សុរិយារៀបលិច
- Sork Krorng Hoeuy Ut (Album: Chlangden Vol. 032) សក់ក្រងហើយអត់
- Sork Veng Anlay (Album: Chlangden Vol. 064) សក់វែងអន្លាយ
- Sork Veng Mdech Min Ut (Album: Chlangden Vol. 095) សក់វែងម៉្ដេចមិនអត់
- Sou Tram (Album: Chlangden Vol. 083) ស៊ូទ្រាំ
- Sovann Machha (Album: Chlangden Vol. 189) សុវណ្ណមច្ឆា
- Spean Chheu Aphop (Album: Chlangden Vol. 043) ស្ពានឈើអភ័ព្វ
- Spean O-taki (Album: Chlangden Vol. 043) ស្ពានអូរតាគី
- Spean Yole (Album: Chlangden Vol. 052) ស្ពានយោល
- Sra L-ving Pign Keo (Album: Chlangden Vol. 285) ស្រាល្វីងពេញកែវ
- Srach Haeuy On (Album: Chlangden Vol. 203) ស្រេចហើយអូន
- Sros sros sros (Album: Chlangden Vol. 010) ស្រស់ ស្រស់ ស្រស់
- Srar-êm Darng Sroeng Sangkê (Album: Chlangden Vol. 005) ស្រអែមដងស្ទឹងសង្កែ
- Srar-êm Khmao Steu (Album: Chlangden Vol. 062) ស្រអែមខ្មៅស្ទើរ
- Srar-êm Leak Kluon (Album: Chlangden Vol. 063) ស្រអែមលាក់ខ្លួន
- Srarlanh Haeuy Mdech Sa-arb (Album: Chlangden Vol. 051) ស្រលាញ់ហើយម្ដេចស្អប់
- Srei Euy Srei Khmeng (Album: Chlangden Vol. 217) ស្រីអើយស្រីក្មេង
- Srei La-ar Et Kchars (Album: Chlangden Vol. 042) ស្រីល្អឥតខ្ចោះ
- Srey Kit Meul Chos (Album: Chlangden Vol. 041) ស្រីគិតមើលចុះ
- Srey Srey Elov (Album: Chlangden Vol. 002) ស្រីស្រីឥឡូវ
- Sro-Lanh-Trov-Hean (Album: Chlangden Vol. 003) ស្រលាញ់ត្រូវហ៊ាន
- Srok Toek Pnek Rieng Avey? (Album: Chlangden Vol. 021) ស្រក់ទឹកភ្នែករឿងអ្វី ?
- Sromol Akara (Album: Chlangden Vol. 103) ស្រមោលអក្ខរា
- Sronos Klen Srey (Album: Chlangden Vol. 097) ស្រណោះក្លិនស្រី
- Sronos Kmao Chrot (Album: Chlangden Vol. 059) ស្រណោះខ្មៅច្រូត
- Sronos Phoum Doem Lvea (Album: Chlangden Vol. 009) ស្រណោះភូមិដើមល្វា
- Sronos Veacha (Album: Chlangden Vol. 197) ស្រណោះវាចា
- Srornos Pka Ptum (Album: Chlangden Vol. 021) ស្រណោះផ្កាផ្ទុំ
- Sros Avey Mles Te? (Album: Chlangden Vol. 052) ស្រណោះអ្វីម្លេះទេ?
- Sros Nis Sros (Album: Chlangden Vol. 073) ស្រស់នេះស្រស់
- Sros Rork Min Ban (Album: Chlangden Vol. 025) ស្រស់រកមិនបាន
- Stoeng Sangkê Kom Prê Chet Thmei (Album: Chlangden Vol. 027) ស្ទឹងសង្កែកុំប្រែចិត្តថ្មី
- Stoeung-Keo (Album: Chlangden Vol. 003) ស្ទឹងកែវ
- Stoeung Keo (Album: Chlangden Vol. 052) ស្ទឹងកែវ
- Su Tram Tam Kam (Album: Chlangden Vol. 004) ស៊ូទ្រាំតាមកម្ម

=== T ===
- Tep Thida Khnong Soben(Goddess in a dream) ទេពធីតាក្នុងសុបិន
- Teuk Pnek Derm Chnom ទឹកភ្នែកដើមឆ្នាំ
- Tgnai Neas Min Jole Pteas (Won't Go Home Today) ថ្ងៃនេះមិនចូលផ្ទះ
- Thavory Meas Bong (Thavory, my Love)* ថាវរីមាសបង
- Thmor Kol Sromol Snae ថ្មគោលស្រមោលស្នេហ៍
- Thnom Snaeh ថ្នមស្នេហ៍
- Tonsai Sdaiy Chan ទន្សាយស្ដាយច័ន្ទ
- Touh yarg nar ទោះយ៉ាងណា
- Troap Koap Chenda ទ្រព្យគាប់ចិន្ដា
- Tikrong Keap ទីក្រុងកែប
- Tirk Dey Koh Pen ទឹកដីកោះប៉ែន
- Tirk Kreurng Anlouk Kjey ទឹកគ្រឿងអន្លក់ខ្ចី
- Tirk Phnek Ovpuk ទឹកភ្នែកឪពុក
- Tirk Ho Krom Spean ទឹកហូរក្រោមស្ពាន
- Tivear Havosan ទិវាអវសាន
- Tumnuñ Kita Meas ទំនួញហ្គីតាមាស
- Thoub Bey Sorsai ធូបបីសសៃ
- Tuk Sneh Tuk Kam ទុក្ខស្នេហ៍ទុក្ខកម្ម
- Tyda Bondoll Chet ធីតាបណ្ដូលចិត្ត
- Tadark Speay Yeam (Album: Chlangden Vol. 027) តាដក់ស្ពាយយាម
- Tep Thida Knong Soben (Album: Chlangden Vol. 038) ទេពធីតាក្នុងសុបិន
- Ter Bong Koss Avey.. (Album: Chlangden Vol. 136) តើបងខុសអ្វី
- Tevada Than Kandal (Album: Chlangden Vol. 039) ទេវតាឋានកណ្ដាល
- Tgnay Lich Nov Eh Neay Samoth (Album: Chlangden Vol. 044) ថ្ងៃលិចនៅឯនាយសមុទ្រ
- Than Suo Ney Monus Kvak (Album: Chlangden Vol. 127) ឋានសួគ៌នៃមនុស្សខ្វាក់
- Thavary Meas Barng (Album: Chlangden Vol. 082) ថាវរីមាសបង
- Thminh Chher Thkor Bey (Album: Chlangden Vol. 030) ធ្មេញឈើថ្ករបី
- Thnorm Chet (Album: Chlangden Vol. 039) ថ្នមចិត្ត
- Thoeb 1000 Dorng (Album: Chlangden Vol. 052) ថើប១០០០ដង
- Thoeb Snam Kdech (Album: Chlangden Vol. 052) ថើបស្នាមក្ដិច
- Thouk Bey Sorsay (Album: Chlangden Vol. 034) ធូបបីសរសៃ
- Tich Ké Tich Knhom (Album: Chlangden Vol. 051) តិចគេតិចខ្ញុំ
- Tngay 12 Kakada (12 July) (Album: Chlangden Vol. 119) ថ្ងៃ១២កក្កដា
- Tngay Chan Anuksa (Album: Chlangden Vol. 125) ថ្ងៃច័ន្ទអនុស្សា
- Tngay Chré (Album: Chlangden Vol. 211) ថ្ងៃជ្រេ
- Tngay Mun Bong Thoeb Oun (Album: Chlangden Vol. 029) ថ្ងៃមុនបងថើបអូន
- Tngay Na Mék Srolas (Album: Chlangden Vol. 031) ថ្ងៃណាមេឃស្រឡះ
- Tngay Na! Tngay Na! (Album: Chlangden Vol. 076) ថ្ងៃណា ថ្ងៃណា
- Tngay Nis Min Chole Pteas Te (Album: Chlangden Vol. 113) ថ្ងៃនេះមិនចូលផ្ទះទេ
- Tngay Sa-ek Bek Knea (Album: Chlangden Vol. 058) ថ្ងៃស្អែកបែកគ្នា
- Tngay Sa-ek Bêk Knea (Album: Chlangden Vol. 051) ថ្ងៃស្អែកបែកគ្នា
- Toe Mean Norna Klas Doch Knhom? (Album: Chlangden Vol. 031) តើមាននរណាខ្លះ
- Toe Pit Reu Té? (Album: Chlangden Vol. 207) តើពិតឬទេ?
- Toek Ho Kraom Spean (Album: Chlangden Vol. 125) ទឹកហូរក្រោមស្ពាន
- Toek Pnék Leu Akara (Album: Chlangden Vol. 151) ទឹកភ្នែកលើអក្ខរា
- Toek Pnek Loe Trung Barng (Album: Chlangden Vol. 010) ទឹកភ្នែកលើទ្រូងបង
- Toek Pnek Malavy (Album: Chlangden Vol. 052) ទឹកភ្នែកម៉ាឡាវី
- Toek Pnék Mouy Tok (Album: Chlangden Vol. 151) ទឹកភ្នែកមួយតក់
- Tomninh Sneha (Album: Chlangden Vol. 049) ទោម្នេញស្នេហា
- Tors Yang Na (Album: Chlangden Vol. 129) ទោះយ៉ាងណា
- Touek Pnek Rumchang (Album: Chlangden Vol. 058) ទឹកភ្នែករំចង់
- Toul Koke Toul Kam (Album: Chlangden Vol. 002) ទួលគោកទួលកម្ម
- Tpol On Samrab Neakna (Album: Chlangden Vol. 086) ថ្ពាល់អូនសម្រាប់នាក់ណា
- Trarpeang Peay (Album: Chlangden Vol. 076) ត្រពាំងពាយ
- Trob Kib Chenda (Album: Chlangden Vol. 219) ទ្រព្យគាប់ចិន្ដា
- Tuk La-or Eng Chos (Album: Chlangden Vol. 059) ទុកល្អឯងចុះ
- Tuk Thnaot (Album: Chlangden Vol. 062) ទូកត្នោត
- Tumnuong Sdach Neak (Album: Chlangden Vol. 135) ទំនួញស្ដេចនាគ
- Tumnuonh Chab Meas (Album: Chlangden Vol. 030) ទំនួញចាបមាស
- Tumnuonh Guitar (Album: Chlangden Vol. 002) ទំនួញហ្គីតា
- Tumnuonh Phokol Kuma (Album: Chlangden Vol. 076) ទំនួញភោគកុលកុមារ
- Tumnuonh Toch Phnom (Album: Chlangden Vol. 060) ទំនួញទោចភ្នំ
- Tung Troong Klang Nass*** (Album: Chlangden Vol. 002) ទឹងទ្រូងខ្លាំងណាស់
- Tveu Avey Kor Tveu Deh (Album: Chlangden Vol. 097) ធ្វើអ្វីក៏ធ្វើដែរ

=== U ===
- Udom Sneha ឧត្តមស្នេហា
- Udom Doung Chet ឧត្ដមដួងចិត្ត

=== V ===
- Veng Suk Alang វាលសោកអាល័យ
- Veasna Ksai Tirk Chu វាសនាខ្សែទឹកឈូ
- Veasna Chaov Cheth វាសនាចៅចិត្ត
- Veal Sreay Sronoss វាលស្រីស្រណោះ
- Vil Veñ Oun (Come Back, Dear) វិលវិញមកអូន
- Vil Veñ Tam Sanya វិលវិញតាមសន្យា
- Violetta វីយ៉ូឡេតា
- Vinhean khan bosiba វិញ្ញាណខន្ធនាងបុស្បា
- Vichara Meas Bong វិជ្ជរ៉ាមាសបង
- Voasa Dal Haouy (Winter Is Here Already) វស្សាដល់ហើយ
- Veacha Yukveachun Korki Thom (Album: Chlangden Vol. 191) វាចាយុវជនគគីរធំ
- Veal Sork Veal Alay (Album: Chlangden Vol. 136) វាលសោកវាលអាល័យ
- Veal Srey Sronos (Album: Chlangden Vol. 100) វាលស្រីស្រណោះ
- Veasna Chao-Chet (Album: Chlangden Vol. 099) វាសនាចៅចិត្ត
- Vey Pign Kromom (Album: Chlangden Vol. 055) វ័យពេញក្រមុំ
- Vil Tam Saniya (Album: Chlangden Vol. 058) វិលតាមសន្យា
- Vilvinh On (Album: Chlangden Vol. 076) វិលវិញមកអូន
- Violleta (Album: Chlangden Vol. 207)វីយ៉ូឡេតា
- Visamak Kal Nov Krong Kep (Album: Chlangden Vol. 207) វិស្សមកាលនៅក្រុងកែប
- Vorng Euy Srey Vorng (Album: Chlangden Vol. 089) វងអើយស្រីវង
- Wat Champou Ka-ek (Album: Chlangden Vol. 191) វត្តចំពុះក្អែក

=== Y ===
- Youp 12 koert (Unforgettable Night of the 12th Increasing Moon) យប់ ១២ កើត
- Yup Menh Oun Yulyuom យប់ម៉ិញអូនញញឹម
- Yup Niss (Tonight) យប់នេះ
- Yup Sngat យប់ស្ងាត់
- Yop Minh Nona Nhonhem Dak Bong (Who Smiled at Me Last Night) យប់ម៉ិញនរណាញញឹមដាក់បង (យប់ម៉ិញអូនញញឹម)
- Yuvachu Samay
- Yum Dembey Chhup Yum យំដើម្បីឈប់យំ
- Yum Bey Ratrey យំបីរាត្រី
- Yulyum Mork ញញឹម មក
- Yulyum Sross
- Yull Chet Rem Pong យល់ចិត្តរៀមផង
- Yang Na Tov Sneha (Album: Chlangden Vol. 025) យ៉ាងណាទៅស្នេហា
- Yihub Pailin (Album: Chlangden Vol. 062) យីហ៊ុបប៉ៃលិន
- Yihup Battambang (Album: Chlangden Vol. 083) យីហ៊ុបបាត់ដំបង
- Yub 12 Kaeut (Album: Chlangden Vol. 039) យប់ ១២ កើត
- Yub Mign Oun Nhonhim (Album: Chlangden Vol. 095) យប់ម៉ិញអូនញញឹម
- Yub Na Doch Yub Na (Album: Chlangden Vol. 219) យប់ណាដូចយប់ណា
- 10 Chnam Reus Proporn (Album: Chlangden Vol. 025) ១០ ឆ្នាំរើសប្រពន្ធ
- 1000 Sarapheap (Album: Chlangden Vol. 029) ១០០០ សារភាព
- 20 Chnam Knong Kuk (Album: Chlangden Vol. 036) ២០ ឆ្នាំក្នុងគុក (ចំណងជើងដើម៖ ´ស្រីដែលខ្ញុំស្អប់´)

== Duets with Ros Sereysothea ==
- Ae Na Prohmacharei ឯណាព្រហ្មចារី
- Anicha Khae Ngongoet អនិច្ចាខែងងឹត
- Akkhara Louhet* អក្ខរាលោហិត
- Bombai Tep Sodachan *
- Baoh Chhung បោះឈូង
- Chhaom Chet Pisey ឆោមចិត្តពិសី
- Chop Choea Haeuy Bros (Stop Believing Men) ឈប់ជឿហើយប្រុស
- Chang Ban Phka Avei? (What Flowers Do You Want?) ចង់បានផ្កាអ្វី?
- Chumnou Trocheak (A Cold Wind) ជំនោរត្រជាក់
- Chan Kesei ច័ន្ទកេសី
- Khoch Mdom Na? (How Am I Bad?) ខូចម្ដុំណា?
- Kolab Snaeha (Love Roses) កុលាបស្នេហា
- Kamlaoh Phnumpenh Kramom Batdambang (កម្លោះភ្នំពេញក្រមុំបាត់ដំបង
- Kamnuoch Veayou កំនួចវាយោ
- Kramom Khmae Leu* ក្រមុំខ្មែរលើ
- Lea Haeuy Kolab Batdambang លាហើយកុលាបបាត់ដំបង
- O Snaeha Euy! (Oh, Love!) (ចម្រៀងគូស្នេហ៍/អូ ស្នេហ៍អើយ!)
- Snaeha Phenovong*
- Yerng chreing lann pinek*
- Chet Et L’ieng* ចិត្តឥតល្អៀង
- Bang Smaoh Luh Ksai* បងស្មោះលុះក្ស័យ
- Kaev Panhchak Poa* កែវបញ្ចពណ៌
- Snaeha Preah Leak Sinakvong* ស្នេហាព្រះលក្ខ័ក្សិណវង្ស
- Snaeha Preah Thaong Neang Neak* ស្នេហាព្រះថោងនាងនាគ
- Thyronagum Neang Nag*
- Phka Angkea Bos* ផ្កាអង្គារបុស្ស
- Duong Preah Chantrea* ដួងព្រះចន្ទ្រា
- Guo prane nisei sene* (Soul mate)
- Nuon L’ang Prom Tou* នួនល្អងព្រមទៅ
- Bopha Thansuokea* (Heavenly flower) បុប្ផាឋានសួគ៌ា
- Than Soben Snae*
- Sene peth thar la-eng*
- Chan Reah Kandal Thngay Trang* ច័ន្ទរះកណ្ដាលថ្ងៃត្រង់
- Yeung Kom Bamplech Knea* យើងកុំបំភ្លេចគ្នា
- Pheakkdei Snaeha* ភ័ក្ដីស្នេហា
- Preah Chineakvong Botumsoriya* ព្រះជិនវង្សបុទុមសុរិយា
- Preah Chineakvong Kosalbopha* ព្រះជិនវង្សកុសលបុប្ផា
- Atitsovan Chankosal* អាទិត្យសុវណ្ណច័ន្ទកុសល
- Chet Muoy Thlaeum Muoy ចិត្តមួយថ្លើមមួយ
- Snaeha Champa Meas* ស្នេហាចំប៉ាមាស
- Kom khoat Bang Ei* (Don't Stop Me) កុំឃាត់បងអី
- Chumrok Snae* (Love Shelter)
- Muoy Kamphlieng Anusavari (One Slap Anniversary) មួយកំផ្លៀងអនុស្សាវរីយ៍
- Snae Bang Ning On* ស្នេហ៍បងនិងអូន
- Soben than sene*
- Sovann Thanann*
- Sdach Domrei Sa* (The White Elephant King) ស្ដេចដំរីស
- Soryonn Gomah*
- Prasna buon kall* (The fourth riddle) ប្រស្នារបួន ខ
- Preas Neng Champ Thuong*
- Chan reas khnong reastrei* (Full moon at midnight)
- Abulkesem*
- Thansor nei yerng* (Ours Heaven)
- Sophear meas bong*
- Akynjah mate mee sraltuom*
- Akareth Mayura*
- Avuoth men ous men slapp*
- Buthamavei seneha Chrisna Devi*
- Pralong gonkear lane* (Water festival)
- Thansor sene yerng*
- Ros sene aldom*
- Somlane sene thmei
- Joss mork praleng* (Come down my love)
- Yerng prote knere heuy*
- Sralmai geu sene*
- Klein pkah prei phnom* (Scent of mountain flower)
- Chuok Roth meas bong*
- Jomroke phekdei* (The Shelter of trust)
- Rorm sene loksei*
- Reing sene yerng*
- Thavary meas bong*
- Jeur Joss ! Jeur Joss!* (Believeth)
- Phuom khmer phuom thmei*
- Sene neu thae sene* (Always will love)
- Yokvyjonn samei thmei* (The youths of new era)
- Sralane bong joss*
- Thanak psane cheit psane* (Status are different from love)
- Meas sene pralnei bong*
- Kmern avei thom jern seneha* (Nothing bigger than love)
- Derm trane yull* (Waving of the tallgrass)
- Gonsan bonjum cheit* (The lover scarf)
- Tyda seneha bong*
- Tep Tyda Kandal sal* (The King of the White Mouse)
- Praland seneha*
- Seneha jumlerth* (The weirdness of love)
- Tonsai sdei chanthere*
- Promdane cheit* (Border of love)
- Chan jak math kere*
- Seneha Laver Jathe*
- Chmreing Tuom Tao*
- Pka reth pkah roi*
- Rothanakvong Neang Sokuntheros*
- Somross Neang Baksai* (The beauty of the bird princess)
- Thngay jurp seneha*
- Mate eoi joi pong*
- Prane nisei seneha*
- Klain sal klain khmao* (The white hawk & black hawk)
- Seneha pratana *
- Sonyah 3 thngay* (The 3 days promise)
- Pkah reth khnong sorn* (Blossom flower in the garden)
- khbone sene kakai*
- Lere heuy songsa khyum* (Gooodbye my love)
- Buthamavei seneha*
- Golap Indonesei*
- Krap klenn Chanthuo*
- Somboth muok jadei sene* (Promises before the grave of love)
- Sene khmean Thngay plett*
- Jerng Phnom Samphov
- Rom thet thheu (Dance again)
- Joui chhrooth shreu (Cultivate rice)
- Sralnoss O'chruo
- Kralmom lerk kloun*
- Phchoo mork darl heuy (Monsoon is here)
- Thnom euy thnom*
- Gonthret torng vong
- Sralane oun tharl thae ban
- Oun geurt chnom euy?
- Jass heuy louk tha!
- Mi mai gall srey
- Bong suom sla srey
- Malop derm sralao
- Enjurn teu nah? (Where are you going?)
- Puot euy srey puot
- Chmreing sene yerng (Song of our love)
- Oun jong yurm phhlae ghoi
- Chravak sene (Chained love)
- Stung anosa
- Jung thale khum hath
- Suert reu yume (Laugh or cry?)
- Tout chiet nas
- Bors nag
- Lerr srey khmao theu journ ongum
- Aknicha san sdei
- Japp pok euy
- Sralane bong teu!
- Chmreing seneha
- Pka euy euy pka
- Stung songkaer sene phekdei
- Roi chnom gall jum darle
- Yerng chreing pei nerk
- Chiet sene terng neu
- Sralane oun rom
- Joll darle aoi mai
- Chnom kroi kae neng
- Sralane srey yupp
- Goe sene khbere stung gumsorth
- Som sla srey
- Anosaovary bei kat
- Trom darle pout gum
- Pralet being srey
- Tout euy srey tout
- Kralmom pem kralsorm
- Pailin doung chiet
- Cheu nas oun
- Om tork joll prate
- Oun rep gah joss
- Mam eng!
- Math kear Phnom Penh dara battambang
- Thmall goll sralmall sene
- Sath japp yume jep
- Jang sdap plain
- Slek doung slek jak
- Romvong chnom thmei
- Hello bong ! hello oun!
- Khdam sralgnay
- Lork guon kralmom
- Srey ngo ngok
- Cingom moi teu
- Penicilline sinn teu
- Sum khjaye goe rom
- Jumnov traljerk* (The cold breeze)
- Phey mless oun*
- Nerk na sene jerng nerk nah?* (Whose love is greater?)
- Chiet klart chiet*
- Sralmall nerk nah?* (Whose shadow?)
- Kralmom arenn
- Kum plete bopha angkor
- Prome derm men prome chong
- Chao dok
- Go bong snan moi (One horn bull)
- Nerk kroe kralmom
- Nerk kroe pathe euy
- Neary samei
- Gondop bok srel
- Svay moi mathe
- Pka kravann
- Mork pei nere thlerk ey
- Tharl oun ayok punman
- Phnom tout phnom thom
- Reing peth roboss oun (My true story)
- Pnete kouth
- Pka avey?
- Klart tharl koss
- Stung songkae komprere chiet thmei
- Bopha doung tao
- Oun rean English
- Enjung gall keng darle
- Neh! oun srey
- Oun prome heuye bong*
- Sene khmern preall
- Khmern loi moi reil tay
- Pros samei apollo
- Mong punman heuy? (What time is it?)
- Chert kroi som geurt cher...
- Therm sene cheva
- Smak therm pralpeini
- Oun sonyah eouy bong jum
- Bong jurp consigner
- The pleing thet deth
- Chan jak math
- Kum lane morl pleu
- Shate rom thall pleu
- Gann dai mon gah
- Teu nah teu pong
- Rei meas shok shkom
- Sorn sene aldom*
- Kamloss mongkolborei srey sereysophaon
- Srey sross pros sathe
- Battambang mern avey chheung?
- Mahop pisess
- Akara Lohet (Album: Chlangden Vol. 076)
- Aknicha Khê La-ngit (Album: Chlangden Vol. 217)
- Allo Oun Allo Bong (Album: Chlangden Vol. 025)
- Anjeugn Tov Na Bong? (Album: Chlangden Vol. 115)
- Anukpheap Ney Bok Mort (Album: Chlangden Vol. 147)
- Anuksavry 3 Khêt (Album: Chlangden Vol. 064)
- Bampé Tepsoda Chan (Album: Chlangden Vol. 076)
- Ban Chea Knhom Samloeng Meul Neang (Album: Chlangden Vol. 061)
- Bêk Teang Toek Pnék (Album: Chlangden Vol. 096)
- Bors Chhoung (Album: Chlangden Vol. 024)
- Chahouy Ning Sankya (Album: Chlangden Vol. 041)
- Champa Koh Thmei (Album: Chlangden Vol. 005)
- Chamrieng TumTeav (Album: Chlangden Vol. 085)
- Chamrieng Visamakal (Album: Chlangden Vol. 085)
- Chan Chak Mek (Album: Chlangden Vol. 059)
- Chan Chor Knong Reatrey (Album: Chlangden Vol. 099)
- Chan Reas Tngay Trang (Album: Chlangden Vol. 103)
- Chang Te Hek Kham (Album: Chlangden Vol. 049)
- Chao Dark (Album: Chlangden Vol. 057)
- Chaô Luoch Chet (Album: Chlangden Vol. 145)
- Chet Et La-ieng (Album: Chlangden Vol. 117)
- Chet Klach Chet (Album: Chlangden Vol. 133)
- Chet Mouy Tloem Mouy (Album: Chlangden Vol. 031)
- Chet Snae Tieng Nov (Album: Chlangden Vol. 083)
- Cheuna Som On Kom Khoeng (Album: Chlangden Vol. 205)
- Chhoeu Nas Oun (Album: Chlangden Vol. 037)
- Chmos Oun Doch Duong Dara (Album: Chlangden Vol. 032)
- Chmous Owne Doch Duong Darah (Album: Chlangden Vol. 001)
- Choeur Chos (Album: Chlangden Vol. 020)
- Chol Chnam Nov Battambang (Album: Chlangden Vol. 022)
- Chol Oun Mdech Ban (Album: Chlangden Vol. 049)
- Chor Lorch Chet (Album: Chlangden Vol. 099)
- Chos Mok Proloeng (Album: Chlangden Vol. 050)
- Chrote Sruv (Album: Chlangden Vol. 001)
- Chumno Kjol Trocheak (Album: Chlangden Vol. 133)
- Eh Na Prum Mjarey (Album: Chlangden Vol. 007)
- Hê Neak Tov Buos (Album: Chlangden Vol. 030)
- Jaerdey Sombaut Snaeh (Album: Chlangden Vol. 211)
- Jass Kaong Knong Srawlang Knear Mdong Teat (Album: Chlangden Vol. 134)
- Jomreang Louk Pkar (Album: Chlangden Vol. 134)
- Kam Sneh Srey Am (Album: Chlangden Vol. 111)
- Kamnap Sneha (Album: Chlangden Vol. 027)
- Kandob Buk Srov (Album: Chlangden Vol. 217)
- Kbon Kakei (Album: Chlangden Vol. 082)
- Kdâm Srarngê (Album: Chlangden Vol. 057)
- Khork Chet Sneh Srey (Album: Chlangden Vol. 033)
- Klach Te Khos (Album: Chlangden Vol. 041)
- Kleb Klen Chanthou (Album: Chlangden Vol. 127)
- Kmean Avey Bombek Loeuy (Album: Chlangden Vol. 149)
- Kmean Avey Thom Cheang Sneha (Album: Chlangden Vol. 103)
- Kmean Muoy Riel Te (Album: Chlangden Vol. 086)
- Knhom Chmos Chey Chet (Album: Chlangden Vol. 099)
- Koch Mdom Na? (Album: Chlangden Vol. 041)
- Kom Khort Bong Ey (Album: Chlangden Vol. 076)
- Kom Leng Muol Plov (Album: Chlangden Vol. 059)
- Komplich Bopha Angkor (Album: Chlangden Vol. 197)
- Kou Sneh Kbeh Stoeung Kampot (Album: Chlangden Vol. 046)
- Krarmom Aranh (Album: Chlangden Vol. 039)
- Kromom Leak Kluon (Album: Chlangden Vol. 032)
- Ku Preng Ni-sai (Album: Chlangden Vol. 100)
- La Bum-Baye (Album: Chlangden Vol. 004)
- Lea Haeuy Kolab Battambang (Album: Chlangden Vol. 062)
- Lea Hoeuy Soumatra (Album: Chlangden Vol. 111)
- Lork Kon Krarmom (Album: Chlangden Vol. 057)
- Mdech Hean Suo Knhom (Album: Chlangden Vol. 099)
- Meas Snae Bro-nei Phorng (Album: Chlangden Vol. 227)
- Mek Euy Chuoy Pharng (Album: Chlangden Vol. 203)
- Mekhea Phnom Penh Dara Battambang (Album: Chlangden Vol. 043)
- Mlub Chrey Duong Chet (Chan Chak Mek) (Album: Chlangden Vol. 119)
- Mlub Sneh Doem Srolav (Album: Chlangden Vol. 119)
- Morn Rongeav (Album: Chlangden Vol. 097)
- Muoy Kamplieng Anouksavry (Album: Chlangden Vol. 044)
- Neak Boeuk Trak Tor Kvas Sneh (Album: Chlangden Vol. 043)
- Neak Na Sneh Cheang Neak Na (Album: Chlangden Vol. 145)
- Neakrou Krormom (Album: Chlangden Vol. 029)
- Neary Chis Kon Korng Toch (Album: Chlangden Vol. 029)
- Neh! Pros Kamsak (Album: Chlangden Vol. 068)
- Nham Skar SINGOME Muoy Tov (Album: Chlangden Vol. 042)
- Noeuk Krub Pel Velea (Album: Chlangden Vol. 097)
- Nuon La-arng Prorm Tov (Album: Chlangden Vol. 082)
- Odom Pheakriyea Teahean (Album: Chlangden Vol. 075)
- Oh! On Thida (Album: Chlangden Vol. 203)
- Om Touk Chol Prek (Album: Chlangden Vol. 037)
- On Rieb Ka Chos (Album: Chlangden Vol. 063)
- Orkun Lok Yeay (Album: Chlangden Vol. 002)
- Pakthom-Vey Sneha Kroeusna Tevy (Album: Chlangden Vol. 185)
- Pathom-vey Sneha (Album: Chlangden Vol. 203)
- Phnom Touch Phnom Thom (Album: Chlangden Vol. 026)
- Phoumara Aphop (Album: Chlangden Vol. 141)
- Pjous Mok Dol Hoeuy (Album: Chlangden Vol. 032)
- Pka Angkea Baos Euy (Album: Chlangden Vol. 100)
- Pka Avey? (Album: Chlangden Vol. 041)
- Pka Euy Pka Putrea (Album: Chlangden Vol. 027)
- Pka Euy Pka Tkol (Album: Chlangden Vol. 103)
- Pka Krovan (Album: Chlangden Vol. 087)
- Pka Rich Haeuy (Album: Chlangden Vol. 181)
- Pkor Lorn Eh Tbong (Album: Chlangden Vol. 097)
- Prorlit Boeng Srei (Album: Chlangden Vol. 064)
- Prorm Doem Min Prorm Chong (Album: Chlangden Vol. 087)
- Prosna 4 Khor (Album: Chlangden Vol. 099)
- Proyat Bapakam Na! (Album: Chlangden Vol. 115)
- Psorng Chuob Krub Cheat (Album: Chlangden Vol. 050)
- Ram Ket Chit Kay (Album: Chlangden Vol. 070)
- Ramvorng Chol Chnam (Album: Chlangden Vol. 027)
- Rattanavong Ning Sokonthearos (Album: Chlangden Vol. 115)
- Rey Meas Sdok Sdam (Album: Chlangden Vol. 062)
- Rieng Pit Robos Oun (Album: Chlangden Vol. 031)
- Rom Cha Cha Cha (Album: Chlangden Vol. 189)
- Rom Tor Tuv Teat (Album: Chlangden Vol. 130)
- Romvong Chnam Thmei (Album: Chlangden Vol. 066)
- Romvong Samay Apollo (Album: Chlangden Vol. 087)
- Rory Chhnam Kor Cham Dae (Album: Chlangden Vol. 083)
- Ros Sneha Odom (Album: Chlangden Vol. 209)
- Sa-ek Rom Tol Ploeu (Album: Chlangden Vol. 059)
- Sabay Vey Kmeng (Album: Chlangden Vol. 012)
- Samrêk Neang Neak (Album: Chlangden Vol. 133)
- Samros Leaksmy (Album: Chlangden Vol. 047)
- Sanaya Bei Choin (Album: Chlangden Vol. 227)
- Saniya Oy Bong Cham (Album: Chlangden Vol. 028)
- Sat Chab Yum Chaeb (Album: Chlangden Vol. 139)
- Smak Bong Mok (Album: Chlangden Vol. 020)
- Snae Doch Toek Plieng (Album: Chlangden Vol. 082)
- Snae Khnong Pel Reatrei (Album: Chlangden Vol. 100)
- Snae Tam Prarpeyni (Album: Chlangden Vol. 010)
- Sneh Bong Ning Oun (Album: Chlangden Vol. 115)
- Sneh Et Ney (Album: Chlangden Vol. 030)
- Sneh Kmean Prê (Album: Chlangden Vol. 076)
- Sneh Nov Te Sneh (Album: Chlangden Vol. 020)
- Sneh Srey On (Album: Chlangden Vol. 021)
- Sneh Than Doseth (Album: Chlangden Vol. 119)
- Sneha Chamlêk (Album: Chlangden Vol. 201)
- Sneha Champa Meas (Album: Chlangden Vol. 058)
- Sneha Champa Meas Ti Pi (Album: Chlangden Vol. 096)
- Sneha Neang Lvea Chek (Album: Chlangden Vol. 141)
- Sneha Preah Thong Neang Neak (Album: Chlangden Vol. 133)
- Soben Suokea (Album: Chlangden Vol. 030)
- Som Kan Mun Ka (Album: Chlangden Vol. 059)
- Som Kjey Kou Rom (Album: Chlangden Vol. 007)
- Som Skohl Ptess Pong (Album: Chlangden Vol. 001)
- Som Sla (Album: Chlangden Vol. 066)
- Sovann Taeng On Oun (Album: Chlangden Vol. 100)
- Srarlanh Bong Tov (Album: Chlangden Vol. 006)
- Srarlanh On Ram (Album: Chlangden Vol. 083)
- Srawlang Srey Ngib (Album: Chlangden Vol. 001)
- Srawlang Terb Skat Mork Rork (Album: Chlangden Vol. 134)
- Srei Ngor Ngark (Album: Chlangden Vol. 042)
- Srey Na Hean Veay Srey Nous Kou Knhom (Album: Chlangden Vol. 185)
- Srey Toch (Album: Chlangden Vol. 097)
- Srey Toch Chroloeung (Album: Chlangden Vol. 097)
- Sromai Ku Snae (Album: Chlangden Vol. 147)
- Sross Doch Knear (Album: Chlangden Vol. 001)
- Starn Suor Starn Snaeh (Album: Chlangden Vol. 002)
- Stoeng Anusa (Album: Chlangden Vol. 096)
- Stoeng Sangkê Snae Pheakdei (Album: Chlangden Vol. 083)
- Svay Muoy Mek (Album: Chlangden Vol. 139)
- Thanak Pseng Chet Pseng (Album: Chlangden Vol. 048)
- Thansuo (Album: Chlangden Vol. 036)
- Thansuo Ney Yeung (Album: Chlangden Vol. 127)
- Tharn Suo Tharn Sneh (Album: Chlangden Vol. 135)
- Theat Dêk Theat Pleung (Album: Chlangden Vol. 057)
- Thnorm Euy Thnom (Album: Chlangden Vol. 119)
- Thoeb Chos (Album: Chlangden Vol. 045)
- Tmor Kol Srormol Sneh (Album: Chlangden Vol. 043)
- Tngay Sa-ek Bek Knea (Album: Chlangden Vol. 046)
- Toch Euy Toch Srei (Album: Chlangden Vol. 070)
- Toe Oun Ah-yuk Pon-marn (Album: Chlangden Vol. 026)
- Toek Chet Ho Tov (Album: Chlangden Vol. 141)
- Vinhean Andêt (Album: Chlangden Vol. 044)
- Yeung Chreang 2 Neak (Album: Chlangden Vol. 083)
- Yeung Kom Plich Knea (Album: Chlangden Vol. 085)

== Duets with Pan Ron ==
- Ah run rah
- Chearng Maik Por Svay*
- Sene reth douth pkah
- Teuk Chross thlak leu thore
- Pkah chuok rohong
- Sess peye teu (As the horse gallop)
- Jurp Phek
- Chmreing bompei
- Jomroke sene
- Seneha Neang Champa
- Lere heuy Romdoll lonvath
- Som sene Preas Perepath
- Torng Neang Vong
- Gampoll boross muok pei (The heroes with 2 faces)
- Kathsongva meas bong
- Seneha Eyna Bossaba
- Gall na pkah reth?
- Kdei sene yerng
- Veryoke Traljerke (Coldness of the breeze)
- Sene douch jerng make
- Sene douch bomnong
- Pka reik mort samoth (Flower blossom in front of the ocean)
- Machoof meas (The Golden Coffin)
- Oun plet reing derm
- Menjess yoll chet
- Bondam Keo Samonthere
- Gomsan gonkear
- Niss geu gum oun (This is my misfortune)
- Chmreing thnom bompei
- Sranlane khnere nas
- Montha meas bong មន្ថា
- Khum hous songkum
- Den mork ! den mork!
- Traljerke chet
- Gumagall pysess
- Geur gum thae oun
- Merr gonn mdong
- Khang baick teu heuy (Flat tires)
- Som thot roup mui
- Juoy ronn lane (Help push car)
- Gonya rom sess (Horse style dance)
- Bong som reann rom
- khmass ynerth
- Rom cha cha cha
- Teptydah gonya sork vain
- Prasad sene* (The castle of love)
- Joll chrok sinn nerng
- Teu...kum teu aren
- Ruop oun l-all jerng gay
- Soben lorth sene
- Golap Phuom gopnymeth
- gumlane men lork tha
- Thnom thpall oun pong
- Chiet sene borisoth
- Rom enjern rom
- Guon gath bey sass
- Oun sboth! sboth!
- Bopha slakat
- Gamloss honda Ganya peises
- Snam kram jurp thpall
- Nerk berk trakteu kvass sene
- Sathe sorm
- Poss mai heu hah
- Jall lort thae thall?
- Lanong tharl cha cha cha
- Chnei khsath koss kong
- Trom darl pout gum
- Rom ban thae
- Somross thmei
- Om tork khnong being
- Smak bong darl reu
- Somross khmer pthem
- Khmao oun khmao khmer
- Men sene bong thae*
- Jall lort bessduong*
- Sralnoss gain toll khnong
- Enjerng rom leng
- Ruop pei cheveth mui
- Sene yerng
- klein klorn malis rorth
- Srey tout tralmere
- Avey heu tha seneha?
- Bek Kang (Album: Chlangden Vol. 028)
- Bondam Neang Keo Samontea (Album: Chlangden Vol. 135)
- Bong Som Rien Rom (Album: Chlangden Vol. 032)
- Bopha Slakete (Album: Chlangden Vol. 043)
- Champey Rik Pros San-Soeum (Album: Chlangden Vol. 020)
- Chamrieng Kaksekor KHMER Boek Srov (Album: Chlangden Vol. 197)
- Chang Ban Te Chet (Album: Chlangden Vol. 046)
- Chang Ram Te CHA CHA CHA (Album: Chlangden Vol. 086)
- Chegnchiegn Tbong 5 (Album: Chlangden Vol. 097)
- Chet 1 Tlaeum 1 (Album: Chlangden Vol. 051)
- Cheung Mek Por Sor (Album: Chlangden Vol. 049)
- Chivit Kakvei Dantrei Sneh (Album: Chlangden Vol. 051)
- Chnam Kroy Kheh Ning (Album: Chlangden Vol. 066)
- Chuob Pheak (Album: Chlangden Vol. 227)
- Duong Champa (Album: Chlangden Vol. 036)
- Hora Tbanh Ay (Album: Chlangden Vol. 045)
- Jan Reangsey Nung Kae-saw Bopha (Album: Chlangden Vol. 135)
- Kal Na Pka Rich (Album: Chlangden Vol. 099)
- Kamakor Pises (Album: Chlangden Vol. 045)
- Kamlos Chas Pas Neak Memay (Album: Chlangden Vol. 063)
- Kbon Chivit (Album: Chlangden Vol. 037)
- Klach Pas Pdei Keh (Album: Chlangden Vol. 066)
- Kmas Gneat Teang Srok (Album: Chlangden Vol. 032)
- Knhom Chreang Neang Rom (Album: Chlangden Vol. 134)
- Kolab Kob Nimit (Album: Chlangden Vol. 060)
- Kolbot Champos Mday (Album: Chlangden Vol. 048)
- Kom Cloeuy Tha Te (Album: Chlangden Vol. 087)
- Kom Leng Prarlam Mén Lok Ta (Album: Chlangden Vol. 060)
- Krarlang Lang Euy (Album: Chlangden Vol. 063)
- Lork Leuy (Album: Chlangden Vol. 046)
- Meul Kon Mdorng (Album: Chlangden Vol. 059)
- Min Ches Yol Chet (Album: Chlangden Vol. 033)
- Min Del Kheunh Sars (Album: Chlangden Vol. 070)
- Montha Meas Bong (Album: Chlangden Vol. 049)
- Ne! Meul Oun Phorng Na (Album: Chlangden Vol. 185)
- Neak Na Dak Chmors Aôy (Album: Chlangden Vol. 083)
- Nov Te Min Nhin (Album: Chlangden Vol. 059)
- Om Touk (Album: Chlangden Vol. 087)
- Om Touk Knong Boeng (Album: Chlangden Vol. 087)
- Pjous Kam Pjous Chet (Album: Chlangden Vol. 099)
- Prarchum Knea Phoek Ram Sabay (Album: Chlangden Vol. 096)
- Pronhab Te Khoeng (Album: Chlangden Vol. 086)
- Prorlong Knea Rom (Album: Chlangden Vol. 032)
- Rortyorn Thmei (new car) (Album: Chlangden Vol. 087)
- Roub Oun Cheang Ké (Album: Chlangden Vol. 026)
- Roub Py Chivit Mouy (Album: Chlangden Vol. 058)
- Sa-ob Pros Dék Pha-ieng (Album: Chlangden Vol. 062)
- Sa-ob Srey Gnam Sra (Album: Chlangden Vol. 059)
- Samros Thmei (Album: Chlangden Vol. 083)
- Sangkhim Cheanik (Album: Chlangden Vol. 047)
- Sék Soam (Album: Chlangden Vol. 063)
- Smak Muoy Chivit (Album: Chlangden Vol. 183)
- Smak Oun 1 (Album: Chlangden Vol. 153)
- Snae Doch Choeng Mek (Album: Chlangden Vol. 010)
- Sneh Leu Akas (Album: Chlangden Vol. 034)
- Sneh Pel Arun Reas (Album: Chlangden Vol. 133)
- Sneh Yeung (Album: Chlangden Vol. 058)
- Soben Luoch Sneh (Album: Chlangden Vol. 045)
- Som Snae Preas Peay Phat (Album: Chlangden Vol. 100)
- Som Thort 1 (Album: Chlangden Vol. 028)
- Srey Kbot Snaeh (Album: Chlangden Vol. 001)
- Srey Toch Sromeh (Album: Chlangden Vol. 115)
- Sroêm Phalla (Album: Chlangden Vol. 024)
- Srolanh Knea Nas (Album: Chlangden Vol. 133)
- Tep Absar Chnam Thmei (Album: Chlangden Vol. 060)
- Téschor Knong Kdey Srormay (Album: Chlangden Vol. 034)
- Toek Chros Anousavry (Album: Chlangden Vol. 219)
- Toh Knear Rorl Tgnai (Album: Chlangden Vol. 001)
- Tov Leng Bon Pchum (Album: Chlangden Vol. 062)
- Tram Dol Phut Kam (Album: Chlangden Vol. 064)
- Trojeak Jet (Album: Chlangden Vol. 002)
- York Tbong Tov Lam Bear (Album: Chlangden Vol. 009)

== Other duets with other artists ==
- Kansaeng Bang Sa (កន្សែងបងស; 'My Scarf is White' with Dara Chom Chan)
- Luok Num Trosong
- Kromum Dondung Mai (with Houy Meas)
- Pteh Psa Pram Knong (with Huoy Meas) (Album: Chlangden Vol. 025)
- Snae Chhlang Veha (ស្នេហ៍ឆ្លងវេហា; with Dy Saveth)
- Pel Reatrey Khae Pleu (រាត្រីខែភ្លឺ; ‘The Night in The Season of Light’ with Sieng Dy)
- Reatrey Ban Chuop Pheak (រាត្រីបានជួបភក្ត្រ័; 'The Night I Met You' with Keo Setha)(In 1966 with Sieng Dy in the movie Apsara)
