= Darling =

Darling is a term of endearment of Old English origin.

Darling or Darlin' or Darlings may also refer to:

== People ==
- Darling (surname)
- Darling Jimenez (born 1980), American boxer
- Darling Légitimus, stage name of Mathilda Paruta (1907–1999), French actress
- Ender Darling (born 1990 or 1991), American neopagan witch
- Prabhas (born 1979), Indian film actor, sometimes nicknamed Darling

== Places ==
=== Australia ===
- Darling Downs, a region in Queensland
- Darling Harbour, Sydney
- Darling Heights, Queensland
- Darling Point, Sydney
- Darling River
- Darling Scarp, an escarpment in Western Australia
- Darling Street, Balmain, Sydney
- Darling railway station, Melbourne

=== Canada ===
- Darling, Alberta

=== Nepal ===
- Darling, Baglung, a Village Development Committee (administrative region)
- Darling, Lumbini, a village and municipality

=== United States ===
- Darling, Arizona (disambiguation)
- Darling, Mississippi, a census-designated place
- Darling, Pennsylvania, a ghost town
- Darling Run, a stream in Ohio

=== Elsewhere ===
- Darling, Chin State, Myanmar
- Darling, South Africa
- Darling Peninsula, Nunavut, Canada
- Darling Township (disambiguation)

== Films ==
- Darling (1961 film), a Spanish-West German comedy film
- Darling (1965 film), a British film directed by John Schlesinger
- Darling (2007 Indian film), an Indian Hindi-language film starring Fardeen Khan
- Darling (2007 Swedish film), directed by Johan Kling
- Darling (2007 French film), starring Marina Foïs, directed by Christine Carrière
- Darling (2010 film), an Indian Telugu-language romantic comedy film by A. Karunakaran
- Darling (2012 film), an Indian Bengali-language film
- Darling (2014 film), an Indian Kannada-language film by Santhosh
- Darling (2015 Indian film), an Indian Tamil-language horror comedy film by Sam Anton
  - Darling 2, its 2016 sequel film
- Darling (2015 American film), an American horror film
- Darlin' (2019 film), an American film
- Darling (2021 film), an Indian Marathi-language film by Ritika Shrotri
- Darling (2024 film), an Indian Telugu-language romantic comedy film by Aswin Raam
- Darlings (film), a 2022 Indian Hindi-language film black comedy film by Jasmeet K. Reen
- Darling! The Pieter–Dirk Uys Story, a 2007 documentary by Julian Shaw
- Army Brats, a 1984 film also known as Darlings

== Music ==
- Darlin' (French band), a short-lived French band that eventually split-off into Daft Punk and Phoenix

=== Albums ===
- Darling (Robert Hazard album), 1986
- Darling (EP), a 2007 promotional EP by Kylie Minogue
- Darling (Yui Horie album), 2008
- Darlings (Kevin Drew album), 2014
- Darlin', a 1981 album by Tom Jones

=== Songs ===
- "Darlin'" (The Beach Boys song) (1967)
- "Darlin'" (Poacher song) (1970)
- "Darlin'" (Roch Voisine song) (1991)
- "Darlin'" (Chase Matthew song) (2024)
- "Oh! Darling", by the Beatles (1969)
- "Darl+ing", by Seventeen (2022)
- "Darling", by Stories (1973)
- "Darling", by Baccara Soja, Dostal (1977)
- "Darling", by Nazar, (1978)
- "Darling", by Cindy & Bert (1979)
- "Darlin'", by Backstreet Boys from their eponymous album (1996)
- "Darling", by Golden Earring from the album Paradise in Distress (1999)
- "Darling", a song by V6 (2003)
- "Darling", by Sons and Daughters (2008)
- "Darling", by Eyes Set to Kill (2009)
- "Darlin", by Avril Lavigne from the album Goodbye Lullaby (2011)
- "Darling", a song by Kana Nishino (2014)
- "Darling", by Girl's Day from the album Girl's Day Everyday 4 (2014)
- "Darling", by Real Estate from the album In Mind (2017)
- "Darling", by Taeyang from the album White Night (2017)
- "Darling", a song by Needtobreathe (2018)
- "Darling", by Halsey from the album If I Can't Have Love, I Want Power (2021)
- "Darling", by Lee Hi from the album 4 Only (2021)
- "Darling", by Nicki Nicole from the album Parte de Mí (2021)
- "Darling", by Zach Bryan from the album American Heartbreak (2022)
- "Darling", by Got7 from the EP Winter Heptagon (2025)

== Other uses ==
- Darling (Blackadder), a character in the British sitcom Blackadder
- Darling (fragrance), promoted by Kylie Minogue
- "Darling" (The Prisoner), a 2009 television episode
- Darling (magazine), a quarterly women’s magazine
- Darling (software), an open source Darwin / OS X compatibility layer for Linux
- Darling: New & Selected Poems, by Jackie Kay
- Darling language, an aboriginal language of the Darling River in Australia
- Darling, an early automobile model manufactured by Neue Automobil Gesellschaft
- Darling, an automobile model manufactured from 1901 to 1902; see List of defunct automobile manufacturers of the United States
- The Darlings, recurring characters on the American television series The Andy Griffith Show

== See also ==
- Darling House (disambiguation), various buildings on the US National Register of Historic Places
- Darling Darling (disambiguation)
- The Darling (disambiguation)
- The Little Darlings (disambiguation)
