= Little Darling (disambiguation) =

"Little Darling" is a single by Australian rock musician Jimmy Barnes

Little Darling or similar may also refer to:

- "Little Darling (I Need You)", a 1966 single recorded by Marvin Gaye
- "Little Darling", a 1974 single by Thin Lizzy
- "Li'l Darlin', a jazz standard written by Neal Hefti
- Lil' Darlin', an album by Red Garland
- "Lil Darlin", a song by ZZ Ward from Til the Casket Drops
- "Little Darlin'", a popular song, made famous by the Diamonds
- The Little Darling, a 1909 comedy short directed by D. W. Griffith

== See also ==
- Little Darlings (disambiguation)
- Darling (disambiguation)
- The Darling (disambiguation)
