= Little Darlings (disambiguation) =

Little Darlings may refer to:

- Little Darlings, a 1980 American teen comedy-drama film
- Little Darlings (Golding novel), a 2019 horror novel by Melanie Golding
- Little Darlings (Wilson novel), a 2010 children's novel by Jacqueline Wilson

== See also ==
- Little Darling (disambiguation)
- Darling (disambiguation)
- The Darling (disambiguation)
