= Tom Hampton =

American singer

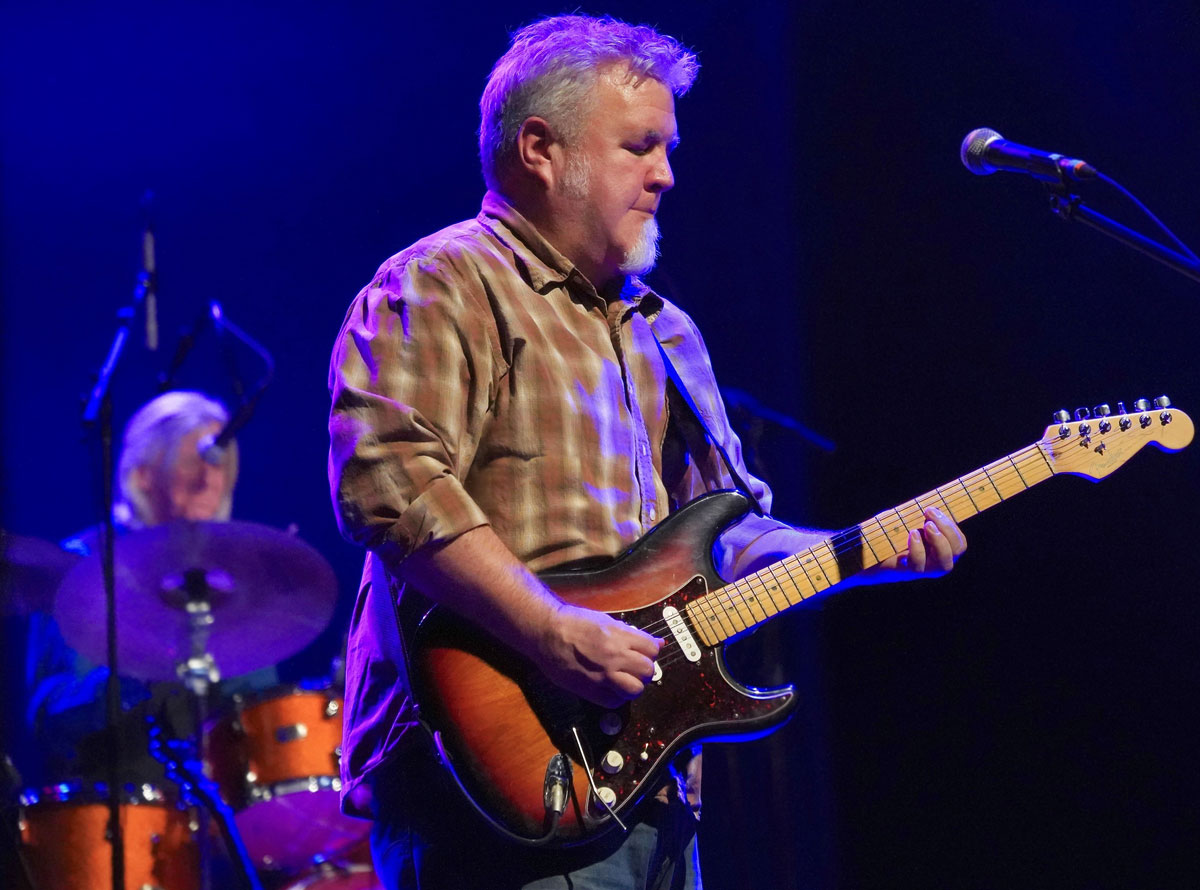
- Tom Hampton, guitarist for Poco, onstage in February of 2020.

Background information
- Born: Thomas Darrell Hampton; July 25, 1965 (age 60); Savannah, Tennessee, United States
- Genres: Americana, Folk rock, Country rock, Rock, Singer-Songwriter
- Instruments: guitar, lap and pedal steel guitar, dobro, banjo, mandolin, more
- Website: www.tomhampton.com

Tom Hampton (born July 25, 1965) is a multi-instrumentalist, sideman, session musician and singer-songwriter. In April 2020, he joined the country-rock band Poco as guitarist and vocalist.

== Biography ==
Hampton was born on July 25, 1965, in Savannah, Tennessee. He is an American musician who has predominantly worked as a session musician and touring sideman. Hampton is also an accomplished recording artist and singer/songwriter who occasionally releases his own material.

== Early years ==
Hampton began his musical career as a drummer during his junior high school years; having taught himself to play on a kit that he bought from a neighbor. By his late teens, he was a veteran of the clubs and "beer joints" that dotted the landscape of his hometown and surrounding area. Hampton had been inspired by musical artists such as Jackson Browne, Dan Fogelberg and Stephen Stills, which led to his desire to learn guitar and explore songwriting...noting that "it’s prohibitively difficult to write a song on the drums."

After graduating high school, he enlisted in the United States Navy, where he served from 1984 to 1988. After his honorable discharge from the military, Hampton relocated to Philadelphia, Pennsylvania. He immediately began working as a musician, first joining bands and later as a solo acoustic act. He recorded a self-financed, cassette-only set of original songs in 1991, but focused largely on playing cover material to earn a living for his family.

== Sideman and session work ==
Emboldened by his growing confidence in his songwriting, Hampton began focusing on his original material in the mid-nineties. He began seeking out opportunities in the Philadelphia music scene (which he had purposely avoided while playing cover material) and quickly made friends and established a reputation. He began frequenting the Monday night Open Mics at the Grape Street Pub, eventually becoming the host of the popular songwriters' nights until 1996. In 1997, Hampton released Our Mutual Angels on Longview records, with Steven Wellner producing.

In 2001, after struggling to find an audience for his music, Hampton went back to playing guitar for local cover bands for a time. Already an accomplished multi-instrumentalist, he found himself suddenly in demand for sideman and session work with other artists who were once his contemporaries as a songwriter within the local musical community. Hampton's abilities on an array of instruments (guitar, lap steel, pedal steel guitar, dobro, banjo, mandolin, baritone guitar, Vox mandoguitar, Weissenborn Hawaiian guitar, mandola, octave mandolin, cittern, bouzouki, coral electric sitar) created a niche for him over the years as a first-call utility player for a number of notable artists - some of whom he tours and records with on a regular basis, such as Nashville songwriting legend Craig Bickhardt (Hampton can be heard on Bickhardt's 2011 live concert recording, Live At Sellersville Theater.). Hampton has also toured with Bickhardt's band Idlewheel, which included Poco bassist Jack Sundrud. He has also toured and recorded with Hooters guitarist John Lilley, Dan May, J.D. Malone, and Cosmic Americana band Boris Garcia. He has also appeared occasionally with folksinger Tracy Grammer, and has played behind Craig Fuller of Pure Prairie League and Little Feat, and longtime personal guitar hero Paul Cotton of Poco at times.

Hampton was the last guitarist that played in Philadelphia legend Robert Hazard's touring band before Hazard died in 2008. He has also backed and performed with Poco, Pure Prairie League, Eric Andersen, Jonathan Edwards, Jim Photoglo, Vonda Sheppard, Don Henry, Julie Gold, Daryle Singletary and many others. In 2011 alone, Hampton figured prominently in album releases by J.D. Malone, Dan May, Craig Bickhardt, and (co-producing along with Grammy winner Andy Kravitz) the debut album by legendary Philadelphia radio DJ Michael Tearson, titled Stuff That Works.

In late 2012, Hampton appeared on lap and pedal steel guitar as a guest with the Marshall Tucker Band at the Newton Theater in Newton, NJ, beginning a series of shows with the band that have included appearances throughout the Northeast US in the time since. In an interview, Doug Gray called him "one of the best kept secrets" in the Philadelphia area, stating that "Tom is one of those guys that just fits our band."

In 2014, after concluding his stint as a "semi-regular special guest" with Marshall Tucker, Hampton relocated from Philadelphia to Nashville, occasionally touring with songwriter friends Rob Snyder, Channing Wilson, and Erik Dylan while returning to Philadelphia regularly for sessions and live appearances.

== Poco ==
In 2020, Hampton was recruited to fill in on guitar for a series of live shows with Poco in February and March. The success of those shows culminated in an offer to become a permanent member of the band shortly thereafter.

== Discography ==
- Our Mutual Angels, 1997 (LongView Records)
- Noises From The Basement, Volume One, 2006 (ItsAboutMusic.com)
- Friends and Heroes, 2013 (Self-released)

== Session Work Discography ==
Year	Album Title	Artist	Instruments Played
2011	Live at Sellersville Theater	Craig Bickhardt	lap steel guitar, baritone guitar, mandolin, harmony vocals
2011	Stuff That Works	Michael Tearson	acoustic guitar, electric guitar, mandolin, mandola, mandocello, dobro, weissenborn, mandoguitar, 12 string electric guitar, coral electric sitar, banjo, lap steel guitar, baritone guitar, harmony vocals.
2011	Avalon	J.D. Malone	pedal steel guitar, lap steel guitar, baritone guitar, 12 string electric guitar, acoustic guitar, high-string acoustic guitar, mandolin, dobro, harmony vocals
2011	Dying Breed	Dan May	lap steel guitar, acoustic guitar, high-string acoustic guitar, electric guitar, national resolectric, dobro, baritone guitar, harmony vocals
2011	Leaning Tree	Blake Allen	pedal steel guitar, baritone guitar, harmony vocals
2011	Rosewood	Mercy Blue	pedal steel guitar, lap steel guitar
2010	Eden	Craig Bancoff	electric guitar, lap and pedal steel guitar, dobro, banjo, mandolin, mandola, bouzouki, baritone guitars
2009	Lucky Kinda Guy	John Lilley	pedal steel guitar, lap steel guitar, baritone guitar, harmony vocals
