= Troubadour (Robert Hazard album) =

Studio album by Robert Hazard
- Released: October 9, 2007
- Studio: Alcove Sound, Oneida, New York; Soundesign, Brattleboro, Vermont
- Genre: Rock; country rock; folk rock
- Length: 61:26
- Label: Rykodisc
- Producer: Karen Savoca; Pete Heitzman

Robert Hazard chronology
Blue Mountain (2004)	Troubadour (2007)

Professional ratings
Review scores
Source	Rating
AllMusic	3/5 stars

Troubadour is the sixth and final album by American musician Robert Hazard, released on October 9, 2007, by Rykodisc.

== Track listing ==
All tracks are written by Robert Hazard

No.	Title	Length
1.	"I Still Believe in You"	4:45
2.	"Bound"	6:21
3.	"Nobody But the Night"	4:06
4.	"Somebody Else's Dream"	5:09
5.	"She Loves Me Too"	4:38
6.	"A Whole Lot of Water"	5:02
7.	"Blood on My Hands"	5:04
8.	"Troubadour"	6:14
9.	"Lucky Hat"	4:44
10.	"To Be with You"	4:26
11.	"Midnight Gal"	4:22
12.	"Ride to Town"	6:35
Total length:		01:01:26

== Personnel ==
Musicians

- Robert Hazard – lead vocals, acoustic guitar
- Pete Heitzman – electric guitar (all tracks except 11), slide guitar (4, 6, 9, 10), acoustic guitar (6, 7, 10), baritone guitar (3), organ (1, 10), mandolin (6), volume pedal (2), backing vocals (4)
- Karen Savoca – percussion (1, 4, 6), backing vocals (2, 4, 6), clavinet (9), tambourine (10)
- T-Bone Wolk – acoustic and electric bass guitar, organ (2, 4, 11), piano (4, 10), accordion (6, 11)
- Nick Langan – harmonica (1, 4)
- Derek Jordan – fiddle (6, 11)
- Eric Andersen – harmonica (8), backing vocals (8)
- Steve Holley – drums, percussion

Technical

- Chris Andersen, Billy Shaw, Alan Stockwell – engineers
- Pete Heitzman, Karen Savoca – mixing
- Jamie Hoyt-Vitale – art direction, design
- Peter Moshay – mastering
- Michael Tearson – liner notes
- Frank Veronsky – photography
