= Wings of Fire =

Wings of Fire may refer to:

== Literature ==
- Wings of Fire (novel series), a book series by Tui T. Sutherland
- Wings of Fire (autobiography), autobiography of A. P. J. Abdul Kalam
- Wings of Fire, a 2002 novel by Dale Brown
- Wings of Fire, a 1998 book by Caroline and Charles Todd

== Film and television ==
- Wings of Fire (film), a 1967 American made-for-television action-drama film
- "Wings of Fire", an episode from the 3rd season of Legends of Chima

== Music ==
- The Wings of Fire, Volume I : Blood (1995) and The Wings of Fire, Volume II : Toil (1997), two albums by Philippe Leduc
- "Wings of Fire", a song on the 2009 album The Return of Mylo by Mylo

== See also ==
- Wing of Fire, a 1984 album by Robert Hazard
- Agnipankh (English: The Wings of Fire), a 2004 Indian film
- Agni Siragugal (English: Wings of Fire), an upcoming Indian Tamil-language action thriller film
- On Wings of Fire, a 1986 English-language Indian film
- "On Wings of Fire", the motto of the 426 Transport Training Squadron
