= J.D. Malone =

American singer

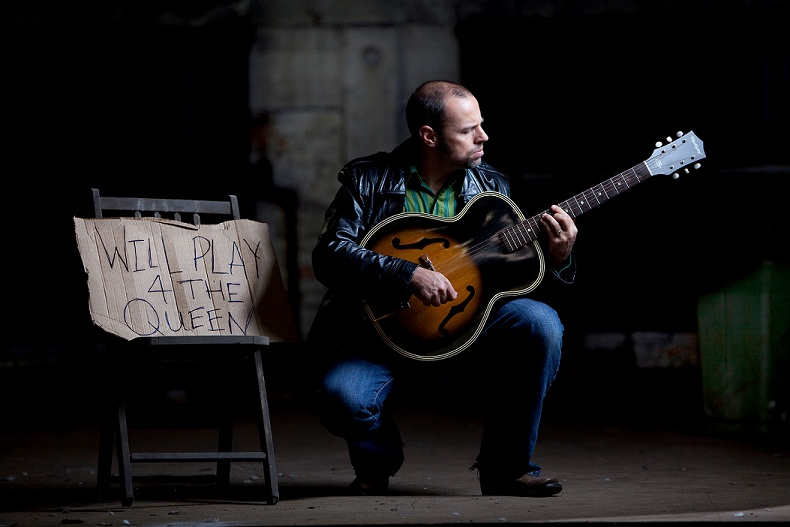

Background information
- Born: John Denis Maloney; 1965 (age 60–61)
- Origin: Bennington, Vermont, United States
- Genres: Folk
- Occupation: Singer-songwriter
- Instruments: Vocals, guitar
- Years active: 1993–present
- Label: Label
- Website: JD Malone Also Do What You Can Do

John Dennis Maloney Jr. (known as J.D. Malone, born 1965) is an American singer.

== Biography ==
J.D. Malone, born in 1965, grew up in the small town of Bennington, Vermont. Malone has said "he has great memories of his childhood with his mother being his biggest influence on him with her love of music." Malone has three siblings, two brothers and a sister. He was very involved in sports when attending high school and played varsity football and varsity baseball. After high school graduation in the year of 1983 from Mount Anthony Union High School, J.D. Malone had enlisted with the Navy, July 3, 1983. Malone spent one year in San Diego, California, in Navy schools and then five years on a guided missile cruiser, USS Biddle (CG-34), based out of Norfolk, Virginia. Malone became a sonar technician and attained the rank of E6, Petty Officer First Class.

He married Carolyn Ann Breckley on May 23, 1988, and since has had two children.

On July 4, 1989, he completed his 6-year enlistment with the Navy. Soon after, he moved to the Philadelphia, Pennsylvania area. Malone worked as a burglar alarm technician for Security Link burglar alarm systems when he first moved to Pennsylvania, then worked at Ensoniq Corporation making musical keyboards.

== 1990s ==
J.D. Malone officially started his career as a singer-songwriter, getting involved with the local music scene of the Philadelphia area in the early 1990s. Malone founded the pop/rock band Steamroller Picnic in October 1993, in which he sang and fronted the band until September 2004. During this time, the band was sponsored by Coors Light from 1996 to 2000 with billboards on the I-95 and I-76 corridors in the Philadelphia area. Bud Light also sponsored the "Steamroller Picnic" from 2000 to 2004.

== 2000s ==
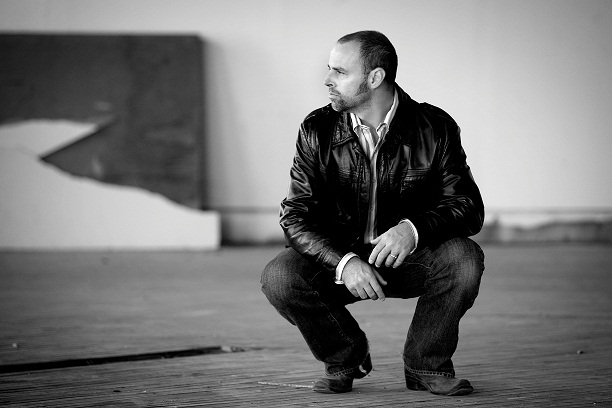
October 2009, taken by Joe Tutlo

J.D. Malone, with his band, released an independent CD, Grow (2002), produced by Andy Kravitz at the Brick-house recording studio/production company, located in Philadelphia, and went on to make an appearance in July 2003, as the featured band on MTV's Advance Warning.

J.D. Malone started to perform as "Malone and McWilliams" in September 2004, and released Malone and McWilliams' Greatest Hits in 2005. Malone and McWilliams, Los Angeles was released in 2006; it was listed on the Freeform American Roots Chart in June 2007.

May 2008, J.D. Malone released his first solo recording, Dia de los Muertos, which was recorded at the Philadelphonic studios in Philadelphia.

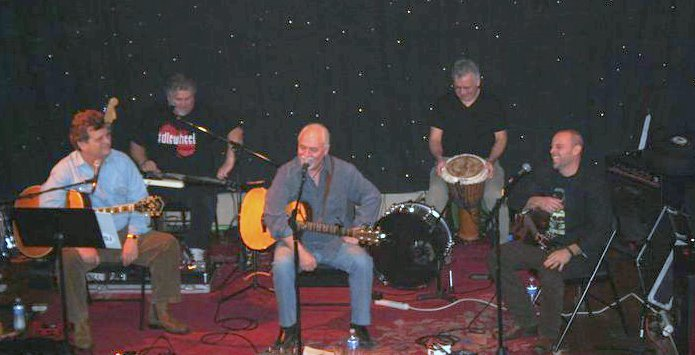
On The Road and in the Round with J.D. Malone and Friends, March 12, 2011

On August 9, 2009, J.D Malone appeared at Musikfest in Bethlehem, Pennsylvania. Malone went on to make an appearance on 6 ABC Tuned In on January 28, 2010. J.D. Malone released a second solo recording in April 2010, entitled Use This Side and Save My Face, with The Experts, which included Tom Hampton, Avery Coffee, Jim Miades and Tommy Geddes and was engineered by James Stapleford at Chaplin's in Spring City, Pennsylvania. On March 12, 2011, J.D. Malone appeared with Thom Schuyler and Craig Bickhardt for a performance that included original music from all three artists.

On May 7, 2011, J.D. Malone appeared at Chaplin's Music Cafe to perform with friends of the late Robert Hazard. With Malone was Fred DiTomasso, Ken Bernard, Larry Broido, who flew in from Hawaii to be at this event, Tom Hampton, Michael Vernacchio, Rick Bell, and Tommy Geddes, along with Nik Everett, Scott Birney, Jan Ward, and Randy Glinton, who performed "Escalator of Life".

J.D. Malone and the Experts released a new recording with a DVD on July 12, 2011, entitled Avalon. It was produced by J.D. Malone, Dean Sciarra and Phil Nicolo at Studio 4, Conshohocken, Pennsylvania. Executive Producer was Dean Sciarra for ItsAboutMusic.com.

=== Interviews ===
J.D. Malone was interviewed by K.D. Norris from the Bennington Banner of Vermont on his new release Avalon. Discussing his journey as a musician, "JD Malone reaches for stars but remembers roots."

Richard Marcus wrote a music review, August 6, 2011, on J.D. Malone and the Experts' release of Avalon. Marcus wrote, "Here what you have is a group that takes that extra fraction of time required to enjoy the moment while they're in it, which imbues a song with life."

Rob Nagy from the Pottstown Mercury interviewed J.D. Malone on his new release of Avalon and discussed what is next for J.D. Malone and the Experts. Malone went on to say "he wants to make a difference beyond his music, and has recently created the "Do What You Can Do" project, which is attempting to carry the message to the average person to change their lives by doing what they can do to make a difference in other people's lives and, in so doing, change their own."

"Rocker J.D. Malone brings one-of-a-kind 'Do What You Can Do' tour to Maryville", interview by Steve Wildsmith, October 12, 2011. Steve Wildsmith wrote, "J.D. Malone is a rock 'n' roller, not a doctor," discussing what it means to be a part of the Do What You Can Do Tour.

== Discography ==
- Grow, in 2002, engineered by Andy Kravitz
- Malone and McWilliams Greatest Hits in 2005
- Malone and McWilliams, Los Angeles in 2006
- J.D Malone and The Experts – Mad Cow in 2007
- J.D Malone and The Experts – Dia de los Muertos in 2008
- J.D Malone and The Experts – Use this Side and Save My Face in 2010
- J.D Malone and The Experts – Avalon 2011
