= Girls Just Want to Have Fun =

1983 single by Cyndi Lauper

Single by Cyndi Lauper

from the album She's So Unusual
- B-side: "Right Track Wrong Train"
- Released: October 17, 1983
- Studio: Record Plant (New York City)
- Genre: New wave; pop; bubblegum
- Length: 3:58
- Label: Portrait
- Songwriter: Robert Hazard
- Producers: Rick Chertoff; William Wittman

Cyndi Lauper singles chronology
"Girls Just Want to Have Fun" (1983)	"Time After Time" (1984)

Music video
- "Girls Just Want to Have Fun" on YouTube

Audio sample
- file; help

"Girls Just Want to Have Fun" is a song written in 1979 by Robert Hazard and made famous in 1983 by the American singer-songwriter Cyndi Lauper, who changed some of the lyrics. It was released by Portrait Records as Lauper's debut single from her first solo album, She's So Unusual (1983), which was released four days earlier. Lauper's version gained recognition as a feminist anthem and was promoted by an MTV Video Music Award–winning music video directed by Edd Griles. It has been covered by more than 30 other artists.

The single was Lauper's breakthrough hit, reaching No. 2 on the US Billboard Hot 100 chart and becoming a worldwide hit throughout late 1983 and early 1984. With 14 million copies sold worldwide, is considered one of Lauper's signature songs and was the second best-selling single of the 1980s by a female artist.

The lists "Rolling Stone and MTV: '100 Greatest Pop Songs': 1–50", "Rolling Stone: The 100 Top Music Videos" and "VH1: 100 Greatest Videos" ranked the song at No. 22, No. 39 and No. 45, respectively. The song received Grammy nominations for Record of the Year and Best Female Pop Vocal Performance at the 27th Annual Grammy Awards.

Lauper released a new version, "Hey Now (Girls Just Want to Have Fun)", as the first single from her 1994 compilation album Twelve Deadly Cyns...and Then Some. It reached the top 10 in several countries. In 2013, "Girls Just Want to Have Fun" was remixed by Yolanda Be Cool for the 30th-anniversary reissue of She's So Unusual.

== Background ==
The song was written in 1979 by rock musician Robert Hazard, who performed it with various bands in the Philadelphia area, and enjoyed some local college radio airplay with a demo recording he made. Hazard wrote it as a rock song coming from the male perspective. Hazard's friend, producer Rick Chertoff, brought it to Cyndi Lauper to record as a pop-electronic song. Lauper "flipped the script" and made it carry a feminist attitude by subtly changing some of the lyrics at the suggestion of Chertoff, and she had her own suggestions about how her version should sound. For the recording sessions, Chertoff brought in two longtime musician friends from the Hooters: keyboardist Rob Hyman and guitarist Eric Bazilian. Lauper later said that the Hooters were "my band before I had a band." The song appeared on Lauper's 1983 debut record She's So Unusual.

The track is a synthesizer-backed anthem, from a feminist perspective, conveying the point that all women really want is to have the same experiences that men can have. Gillian G. Gaar, author of She's a Rebel: The History of Women in Rock & Roll (2002), described the single and corresponding video as a "strong feminist statement", an "anthem of female solidarity" and a "playful romp celebrating female camaraderie."

The song's success overshadowed Hazard's own music career. His 1984 album Wing of Fire was a sales disappointment at the same time that Lauper's version of "Girls Just Want to Have Fun" was going Gold, making him a millionaire. After Lauper claimed in interviews to have co-written the song, Hazard served her with a cease and desist letter. He was able to buy a New Jersey lake house and a horse farm from the song's royalties, although he said that federal taxes took most of the money.

== Critical reception ==
Cash Box said that "Robert Hazard's original male point of view is transformed into a cheerleader-like sing-along for party girls, and the Toni Basil–like beat is augmented by a hooky, ringing guitar." Writing for UK publication Music Week, Tony Jasper described the song as "US company's answer to Tracey Ullman or Kirsty McColl" and an "Eighties re-tread of Sixties puppy love with vocalist throat singing", but nonetheless that it had "a definite commercial appeal".

The song's 12-inch single was shipped out in the United States in February 1984, and the remixes by Arthur Baker were described by Billboard magazine as "[recontoured] heavily" and giving the song "the big beat of a rap record and generous helpings of scratch".

== Chart performance ==
The song was released in late 1983, but much of its success on the charts came during the first half of 1984. The single reached the Top 10 in more than 25 countries and reached No. 1 in ten of those countries including Australia, Brazil, Canada, Japan, New Zealand, Norway and on the Irish Singles Chart. It also reached No. 2 on both the UK singles chart and the US Billboard Hot 100.

=== North America ===
In the United States, the song entered the Billboard Hot 100 at No. 80 on December 17, 1983. On the issue dated March 10, 1984, it peaked at No. 2, where it stayed for two weeks, behind Van Halen's "Jump".

"Girls Just Want to Have Fun" entered the Billboard Top Rock Tracks chart in the week dated January 21, 1984. It peaked at number 16 in the week dated February 25, 1984.

In Canada, "Girls Just Want to Have Fun" hit number 1 on the RPM charts on March 31, 1984, where it had a two-week run.

In Mexico "Girls Just Want To Have Fun" stayed in the Top 5 for five months and reached number 1 on October 1, 1984; the song remained number one for six weeks.

=== Europe ===
In the United Kingdom, the song entered the chart at No. 50 on January 14, 1984, and peaked at No. 2 on February 4, 1984, where it stayed for one week. According to a market survey by Music Week, it was the sixth best performing single in the UK for the period from January to March 1984.

In Ireland, the song entered the chart on January 29, 1984. It peaked at No. 1 for two weeks and was on the chart for a total of seven weeks.

In Belgium, the song debut at No. 38 on February 18, 1984, and peaked at No. 4 on April 7, 1984. In the Netherlands, the song entered the chart at No. 38 on February 25, 1984, and peaked at No. 4 on March 31, 1984. In Sweden, the song entered at No. 13 on March 6, 1984, and peaked at No. 5 on April 3, 1984, charting for six weeks. In Switzerland, the song entered the chart at No. 15 on April 1, 1984, and peaked at No. 6 on April 29, 1984. In Austria, the single entered at No. 3 on May 1, 1984, which was its peak position.

=== Oceania ===
In Australia, the song debuted on the Kent Music Report Top 100 on February 27, 1984. It entered the Top 10 in only its third week on the chart and reached No. 1 on March 26, 1984. It topped the chart for two weeks and then remained at No. 2 for four weeks behind Nena's "99 Luftballons". It stayed on the chart for 21 weeks and was the 9th biggest-selling single of the year. In New Zealand, the song debuted at No. 21 on April 1, 1984, and peaked at No. 1 on May 6, 1984, where it stayed for three weeks.

In the Netherlands and New Zealand "Girls Just Want To Have Fun" made the year end charts for the Top 100 of 1984. On the ARC (American Radio Chart), "Girls Just Want To Have Fun" reached number 1 and made the Top 40 songs of the year for 1984.

== Music video ==
The release of the single was accompanied by a music video. It cost less than US$35,000 (equivalent to $113,000 in 2025), largely due to a volunteer cast and the free lending of sophisticated video equipment. The cast included Lauper's close friend, professional wrestler/manager "Captain" Lou Albano in the role of Lauper's father while her real mother, Catrine, played herself. Lauper later appeared in World Wrestling Federation storylines opposite Albano and guest-starred on The Super Mario Bros. Super Show! episode "Robo Koopa/Captain Lou is Missing", in which Albano portrayed Mario (Albano also played himself in the episode). This collaboration was the catalyst for the "Rock 'n' Wrestling" connection that lasted for the following two years. Lauper's attorney, Elliot Hoffman, appeared as her uptight dancing partner. Also in the cast were Lauper's manager, David Wolff, her brother, Butch Lauper, fellow musician Steve Forbert, and a bevy of secretaries borrowed from Portrait/CBS, Lauper's record label. A clip of the 1923 film The Hunchback of Notre Dame is featured as Lauper watches it on television.

Billboard reported that the music video used a "state-of-the-art computer system", a Quantel Mirage computer at Broadway Video, to create special effects. Peter Rudoy, then general manager of Broadway Video, explained that this was the first time the system had been used for a music video and noted that the instrumental section of the video had a "bubbly feeling". Director Edd Griles and producer Ken Walz wanted to create a visual representation of this "bubbly feeling", and took an image from the video and then "wrapped it into the shape of a bubble".

Saturday Night Live creator Lorne Michaels, another of Hoffman's clients, agreed to give Lauper free run of his brand new million-dollar digital editing equipment, with which she and her producer created several first-time-ever computer-generated images of Lauper dancing with her buttoned-up lawyer Hoffman, leading the entire cast in a snake-dance through New York streets and ending up in Lauper's bedroom in her home. The bedroom scene is an homage to the famous stateroom scene in the Marx Brothers' film A Night at the Opera (1935).

The music video began receiving airplay on MTV in October 1983. Also at the same year, the channel's I Want My MTV campaign promo briefly played the song in the background when Lauper said the catchphrase.

"The year 1983 marks a watershed in the history of female-address video. It is the year that certain issues and representations began to gain saliency and the textual strategies of female address began to coalesce." In the video, Lauper wanted to show in a more fun and light-hearted manner that girls want the same equality and recognition boys had in society.

Before the song starts, the beginning of her version of "He's So Unusual" plays.

The music video was directed by Edd Griles. The producer was Ken Walz while the cinematographer was Francis Kenny. The treatment for the video was co-written by Griles, Walz, and Lauper. The video was shot on the Lower East Side of Manhattan in summer 1983 and premiered on television in December 1983. The choreography was by a New York dance and music troupe called XXY featuring Mary Ellen Strom, Cyndi Lee and Pierce Turner.

The music video crossed one billion views on YouTube in January 2022.

== Awards and nominations ==
=== Accolades ===
Year	By	List	Work	Ranked
1985	The Village Voice	Pazz & Jop critics' poll of 1984	"Girls Just Want to Have Fun"	10
1993	Rolling Stone	The 100 Top Music Videos	"Girls Just Want to Have Fun"	22
1999	MTV	100 Greatest Videos Ever Made	"Girls Just Want to Have Fun"	58
2001	VH1	100 Greatest Videos	"Girls Just Want to Have Fun"	45
2006	VH1	100 Greatest Songs of the 80's	"Girls Just Want to Have Fun"	23

=== Awards and nominations ===
Year	Nominee / work	Award	Result
1983	"Girls Just Want to Have Fun"	American Video Awards for Best Female Performance	Won
1984	"Girls Just Want to Have Fun"	MTV Video Music Award for Video of the Year	Nominated
1984	"Girls Just Want to Have Fun"	MTV Video Music Award for Best New Artist	Nominated
1984	"Girls Just Want to Have Fun"	MTV Video Music Award for Best Female Video	Won
1984	"Girls Just Want to Have Fun"	MTV Video Music Award for Best Concept Video	Nominated
1984	"Girls Just Want to Have Fun"	MTV Video Music Award – Viewer's Choice	Nominated
1984	"Girls Just Want to Have Fun"	MTV Video Music Award for Best Overall Performance	Nominated
1985	"Girls Just Want to Have Fun"	Grammy Award for Record of the Year	Nominated
1985	"Girls Just Want to Have Fun"	Grammy Award for Best Female Pop Vocal Performance	Nominated

== Track listings ==
- 7-inch single

A. "Girls Just Want to Have Fun" – 3:55 (Robert Hazard)
B. "Right Track Wrong Train" – 4:40 (Cyndi Lauper, Ellie Greenwich, Jeff Kent)

- 12-inch single

A. "Girls Just Want to Have Fun (Extended Version)" – 6:08
B1. "Fun With V. Knutsn (Instrumental)" – 7:10
B2. "Xtra Fun" – 5:05

- CD-Rom-Ringle

In 2007, a limited edition which included interactive computer material and a code to download a free ringle of the title track was released. It also contained "Right Track, Wrong Train", the B-side of the original single release.

1. "Girls Just Want to Have Fun"
2. "Right Track Wrong Train"
3. Computer media

== Credits and personnel ==
1. Lyrics: Robert Hazard. Production: Rick Chertoff.
2. Lyrics: Cyndi Lauper, Ellie Greenwich, Jeffrey B. Kent. Production: Rick Chertoff.
- Cyndi Lauper – lead vocals, background vocals
- Jules Shear – backing vocals
- Ellie Greenwich – backing vocals
- Eric Bazilian – bass
- Krystal Davis – backing vocals
- Rick DiFonzo – electric guitar
- Anton Fig – LinnDrum and Oberheim DX
- Rob Hyman – keyboards, Roland Juno-60, synthesizers
- Maretha Stewart – backing vocals
- Diane Wilson – backing vocals

== Charts ==
=== Weekly charts ===
Chart (1983–1984)	Peak position
Australia (Kent Music Report)	1
Austria (Ö3 Austria Top 40)	3
Belgium (Ultratop 50 Flanders)	4
Canada (The Record)	1
Canada Top Singles (RPM)	1
Chile (Clasificación Nacional del Disco)	1
Colombia (UPI)	2
Denmark (IFPI)	2
Europe (Eurochart Hot 100)	1
France (SNEP)	2
Ireland (IRMA)	1
Italy (Musica e dischi)	4
Italy (Discografia internazionale)	3
Luxembourg (Radio Luxembourg)	1
Japan (Music Labo)	16
Japan (Oricon)	17
Japan (Oricon International Chart)	1
Mexico (Hit Parade)	2
Netherlands (Dutch Top 40)	3
Netherlands (Single Top 100)	4
New Zealand (Recorded Music NZ)	1
Norway (VG-lista)	1
Peru (UPI)	1
South Africa (Springbok)	3
Sweden (Sverigetopplistan)	5
Switzerland (Schweizer Hitparade)	6
UK Singles (Official Charts)	2
US Billboard Hot 100	2
US Dance Club Songs (Billboard)	1
US Hot R&B/Hip-Hop Songs (Billboard)	80
US Cash Box Top 100	1
West Germany (GfK)	6
Zimbabwe (ZIMA)	3

Chart (2013)	Peak position
Slovenia Airplay (SloTop50)	2

Chart (2025–2026)	Peak position
Netherlands Airplay (Dutch Charts)	49
Poland (Polish Airplay Top 100)	56

=== Year-end charts ===
Chart (1984)	Position
Australia (Kent Music Report)	9
Australia Pop Singles (Kent Music Report)	4
Austria (Ö3 Austria Top 40)	29
Belgium (Ultratop 50 Flanders)	20
Canada Top Singles (RPM)	9
France (SNEP)	22
Italy (Discografia internazionale)	6
Netherlands (Dutch Top 40)	23
Netherlands (Single Top 100)	40
New Zealand (RIANZ)	7
UK Singles (OCC)	32
US Billboard Hot 100	15
US Cash Box Top 100	16
West Germany (GfK)	47

== Certifications ==
Region	Certification	Certified units/sales
Brazil (Pro-Música Brasil)	3× Platinum	180,000^{‡}
Canada (Music Canada)	2× Platinum	200,000^{^}
Denmark (IFPI Danmark)	2× Platinum	180,000^{‡}
France (SNEP)	Gold	500,000^{*}
Germany (BVMI)	Platinum	600,000^{‡}
Italy (FIMI)	Platinum	70,000^{‡}
Japan (RIAJ)	Gold	100,000^{*}
New Zealand (RMNZ)	5× Platinum	150,000^{‡}
Portugal (AFP)	Gold	20,000^{‡}
Spain (Promusicae)	2× Platinum	120,000^{‡}
United Kingdom (BPI)	3× Platinum	1,800,000^{‡}
United States (RIAA)	6× Platinum	6,000,000^{‡}
Mastertone sales
United States (RIAA)	Platinum	1,000,000^{*}
^{*} Sales figures based on certification alone.^{^} Shipments figures based on certification alone.^{‡} Sales+streaming figures based on certification alone.

== Release history ==
Region	Date	Format(s)	Label(s)	ID	Ref.
United Kingdom	December 30, 1983	7-inch	Epic	A3943	
United Kingdom	January 6, 1984	12-inch	Epic	TA3943	
Japan	February 25, 1984	7-inch; 12-inch	Portrait	07・5P-267; 12・3P-509	

== "Hey Now (Girls Just Want to Have Fun)" ==
"Hey Now (Girls Just Want to Have Fun)"

Single by Cyndi Lauper

from the album Twelve Deadly Cyns...and Then Some
- B-side: "Hat Full of Stars"
- Released: September 5, 1994
- Genre: Reggae fusion
- Length: 3:54 (album version); 3:39 (single edit)
- Label: Epic
- Songwriters: Robert Hazard; Lolly Vegas
- Producers: Cyndi Lauper; Jimmy Bralower

Cyndi Lauper singles chronology
"Hat Full of Stars" (1993)	"Hey Now (Girls Just Want to Have Fun)" (1994)	"I'm Gonna Be Strong" (1994)

Music video
- "Hey Now (Girls Just Want to Have Fun)" on YouTube

On September 5, 1994, Epic Records released a new version of the song, "Hey Now (Girls Just Want to Have Fun)", as the first single from Lauper's first compilation album, Twelve Deadly Cyns...and Then Some (1994). It incorporates a reggae feel and an interpolation of "Come and Get Your Love" by Redbone from 1974. The arrangement evolved as she experimented with the song's style over the course of the 1993–1994 Hat Full of Stars Tour.

The single reached the top 10 in several countries. It reached number 4 in the UK, becoming Lauper's first top-10 hit there since 1989 with "I Drove All Night". It also reached number 4 in New Zealand. In the US, it reached number 87 on the Billboard Hot 100 following its August 8, 1995, release to contemporary hit radio; it is Lauper's last single to chart in the United States. She directed a new music video for the song by herself.

=== Critical reception ===
Steve Baltin from Cash Box noted that the "reggae-flavored dance oriented remake" is being given a big boost from the film To Wong Foo, Thanks For Everything, Julie Newmar. He added, "Lauper still sounds in fine form on the very easy going kick-back track. Particularly fun is the jammin' guitar solo bridge in the middle of the single." In his weekly UK chart commentary, James Masterton said, "The new version slows the track down to turn it into a far slinkier dance groove to quite inspired effect". Alan Jones from Music Week wrote, "Turning a familiar old favourite into a dance groove unusually required a drop in tempo here, reducing it to a slinky shuffle. The melody and Cyndi's excellent vocals are still its selling points, and the success of Cyndi's Twelve Deadly Cyns album suggests the timing could be right to make this a hit again." Tommy Udo of NME considered it a "totally unnecessary reworking" and commented, "It just sounds like somebody's hamfisted and amateurish remix that would normally be hidden away as track 18 – you know, the Will This Do? Mix by DJ Krap – although oddly enough, Cyndi herself had a hand in it all." He concluded, "She could still be bigger than Madonna!"

=== Music video ===
A music video was produced to promote the new version, directed by Cyndi Lauper herself and later made available on YouTube in 2010. It had generated more than 4.7 million views as of April 2025.

=== Track listings ===
- European CD single; UK cassette single
1. "Hey Now (Girls Just Want to Have Fun)" (Single Edit) – 3:39
2. "Hat Full of Stars" – 4:27
- CD single (US/UK); European CD maxi-single
1. "Hey Now (Girls Just Want to Have Fun)" (Single Edit) – 3:39
2. "Hey Now (Girls Just Want to Have Fun)" (Mikey Bennett's Carnival Version featuring Patra) (Edit) – 4:09
3. "Hey Now (Girls Just Want to Have Fun)" (Sly & Robbie's Home Grown Version featuring Snow) – 4:16
4. "Hey Now (Girls Just Want to Have Fun)" (Vasquez Remix Pop Goes the Dancehall featuring Snow) – 5:04
5. "Girls Just Want to Have Fun" (Original Version) – 3:54
- Japanese CD single
1. "Hey Now (Girls Just Want to Have Fun)" (Single Edit) – 3:39
2. "Hey Now (Girls Just Want to Have Fun)" (Mikey Bennett's Carnival Version featuring Patra) (Edit) – 4:09
3. "Hey Now (Girls Just Want to Have Fun)" (Sly & Robbie's Home Grown Version featuring Snow) – 4:16
4. "Hey Now (Girls Just Want to Have Fun)" (Vasquez Remix Pop Goes the Dancehall featuring Snow) – 5:04
- Australian CD single
1. "Hey Now (Girls Just Want to Have Fun)" (Single Edit) – 3:39
2. "Hey Now (Girls Just Want to Have Fun)" (Vasquez Remix Pop Goes the Dancehall featuring Snow) – 5:04
3. "Hey Now (Girls Just Want to Have Fun)" (Vasquez Remix Dancehall Main featuring Snow) – 5:50
4. "Hey Now (Girls Just Want to Have Fun)" (Vasquez Remix Harder Dancehall featuring Snow) – 5:49
5. "Hey Now (Girls Just Want to Have Fun)" (Sly & Robbie's Home Grown Version featuring Snow) – 4:16
6. "Hey Now (Girls Just Want to Have Fun)" (Vasquez Lounge Mix featuring Snow) – 6:12
7. "Hey Now (Girls Just Want to Have Fun)" (Mikey Bennett's Carnival Version featuring Patra) (Edit) – 4:09
- European 12-inch
1. "Hey Now (Girls Just Want to Have Fun)" (Vasquez Remix Pop Goes the Dancehall featuring Snow) – 5:04
2. "Hey Now (Girls Just Want to Have Fun)" (Vasquez Remix Dancehall Main featuring Snow) – 5:50
3. "Hey Now (Girls Just Want to Have Fun)" (Vasquez Remix Harder Dancehall featuring Snow) – 5:49
4. "Hey Now (Girls Just Want to Have Fun)" (Sly & Robbie's Home Grown Version featuring Snow) – 4:16
5. "Hey Now (Girls Just Want to Have Fun)" (Vasquez Lounge Mix featuring Snow) – 6:12
6. "Hey Now (Girls Just Want to Have Fun)" (Vasquez Lounge Dub featuring Snow) – 6:00
7. "Hey Now (Girls Just Want to Have Fun)" (Mikey Bennett's Carnival Version featuring Patra) – 6:00

=== Charts ===
==== Weekly charts ====
Chart (1994–1995)	Peak position
Australia (ARIA)	62
Belgium (Ultratop 50 Flanders)	50
Denmark (IFPI)	6
Europe (Eurochart Hot 100)	15
Europe (European AC Radio)	5
Europe (European Dance Radio)	23
Europe (European Hit Radio)	12
Finland (IFPI)	12
France (SNEP)	3
Germany (GfK)	56
Iceland (Íslenski Listinn Topp 40)	25
Ireland (IRMA)	10
Israel (Israeli Singles Chart)	6
New Zealand (Recorded Music NZ)	4
Scottish Singles Sales (Official Charts)	5
Sweden (Sverigetopplistan)	38
Switzerland (Schweizer Hitparade)	37
UK Singles (Official Charts)	4
UK Airplay (Music Week)	13
UK Club Chart (Music Week)	100
US Billboard Hot 100	87
US Cash Box Top 100	81

==== Year-end charts ====
Chart (1994)	Position
Europe (Eurochart Hot 100)	83
New Zealand (RIANZ)	48
UK Singles (OCC)	38

=== Certifications ===
Region	Certification	Certified units/sales
United Kingdom (BPI)	Silver	200,000^{^}
^{^} Shipments figures based on certification alone.

=== Release history ===
Region	Date	Format(s)	Label(s)	Ref.
United Kingdom	September 5, 1994	12-inch vinyl; CD; cassette	Epic	
Australia	September 19, 1994	CD; cassette	Epic	
Japan	September 29, 1994	CD	Epic	
United States	August 8, 1995	Contemporary hit radio	Epic	

== Race for Life version ==
"Girls Just Want to Have Fun"

Single by Race for Life
- Released: April 26, 2010
- Recorded: 2010
- Genre: Pop
- Length: 3:22
- Label: Epic, Portrait, CBS
- Songwriter: Robert Hazard

In 2010, Cancer Research UK arranged for a charity record for their Race for Life campaign. It featured many celebrities such as EastEnders actress Nina Wadia, Coronation Street actress Kym Marsh, Life of Riley actress Caroline Quentin, glamour girl Danielle Lloyd, X Factor finalist Lucie Jones, singer Sonique (herself a breast cancer survivor), former EastEnders actress Lucy Benjamin, and Celebrity Big Brother's Nicola T.

The single was released on April 26, 2010. The physical edition was exclusively distributed to over 800 stores run by Tesco, an official partner of the event series. The digital edition was released on iTunes. The sales were to be used for cancer research. This version debuted at No. 1 and stayed on the UK charts for 21 more weeks.

== Other versions ==
- Hip house duo Happy Nation's "Girls Just Wanna Have Fun" samples the vocals from the 1990 song "Jammed in the USA" by Girls with Attitudes which itself interpolates vocals from "Girls Just Want to Have Fun". The single reached No. 77 on the UK Singles Chart in 1998.
- English singer Lolly released her version as a single in 2000 from her second album Pick 'n' Mix which reached No. 14 on the UK Singles Chart.
- Miley Cyrus covered "Girls Just Wanna Have Fun" for her 2008 album Breakout. The song reached No. 92 on the charts in Canada.
- Shaggy's 2012 song "Girls Just Wanna Have Fun" featuring rapper Eve from his album Rise interpolates "Girls Just Want to Have Fun". It charted in five countries in Europe.
- Trinidadian-American rapper Nicki Minaj's "Pink Friday Girls" from her 2023 album Pink Friday 2 contains interpolated vocals from "Girls Just Want to Have Fun". Despite not being released as an official single, the song still charted in both the US and UK, reaching No. 82 on the Billboard Hot 100 and No. 30 on the UK Singles Chart in 2023.

== See also ==
- 1983 in music
- List of number-one dance singles of 1984 (U.S.)
- Wanna Have Fun
