= Holt Cemetery =

Potter's field cemetery in New Orleans, Louisiana US

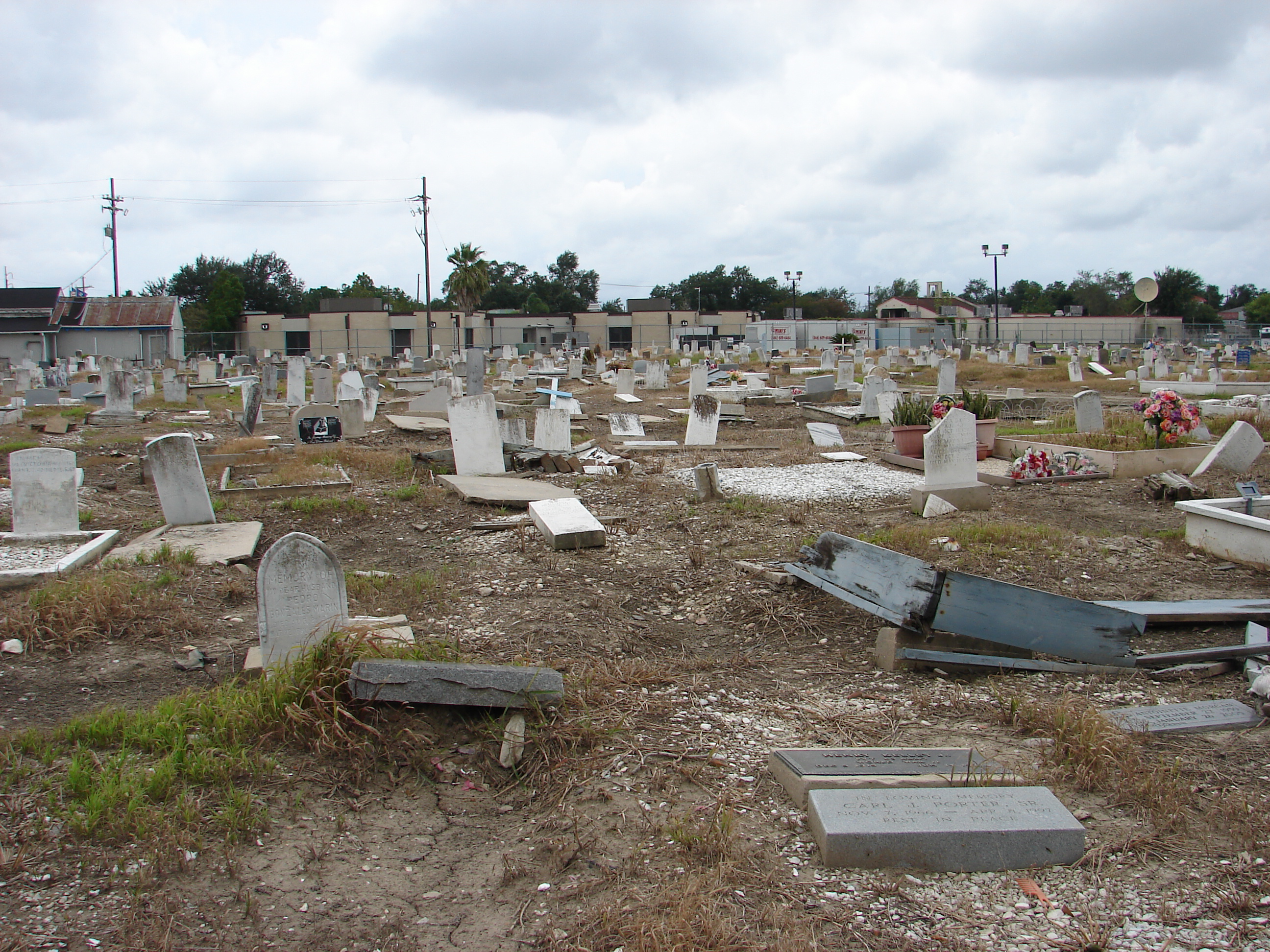
- Interactive map of Holt Cemetery

Details
- Established: 1879; 147 years ago
- Location: 4901 Rosedale Drive, New Orleans, Louisiana, United States
- Coordinates: 29.98498°N 90.10613°W
- Type: Potter's Field
- Owned by: City of New Orleans
- Size: 7 acres
- No. of graves: 2391

Holt Cemetery is a potter's field cemetery in New Orleans, Louisiana, United States. It is located next to Delgado Community College, behind the right field fence of the college's baseball facility, Kirsch-Rooney Stadium. The cemetery is named after Dr. Joseph Holt, an official of the New Orleans Board of Health (famously involved with city health issues concerning Storyville, the Red-light district of New Orleans) who officially established the cemetery in the 19th century. Holt Cemetery is one of the Historic Cemeteries of New Orleans.

The cemetery was established in 1879 to inter the bodies of poor or indigent residents of the city. Funeral processions to Holt Cemetery were generally around, rather than through, the city. The original cemetery was 5.5 acres, and it was expanded in 1909 to 7 acres. Nearly all of the tombs are in-ground burials. As established, ownership of the graves at Holt Cemetery was given to the families of the deceased for the cost of digging the grave and subsequent maintenance of the plot.

Most of the graves and tombs at Holt Cemetery were not commercially or professionally produced but were instead fabricated by families of the deceased, giving the cemetery a strong personal touch.

The cemetery contains the remains of early blues and jazz musicians including Babe Stovall, Jessie Hill and Charles "Buddy" Bolden. The battered remains of Robert Charles, at the center of the 1900 New Orleans race riot were briefly interred there, then dug up, and incinerated.

Over the years, Holt Cemetery has been a destination of ghost hunters, with frequent incidents of grave-robbing and reports of Voodoo and Santería rituals. In one notable case, a neopagan witch named Ender Darling took bones from Holt Cemetery for use in magic, posting an offer on a Facebook group for neopagan witches to sell the bones for the cost of shipping. The post quickly attracted controversy on Facebook and Tumblr, leading to Darling's investigation and arrest, the collapse of the Facebook group the offer was posted on, and a new state law strengthening penalties for trafficking in human remains.

The city of New Orleans conducted $450,000 in repairs and upgrades to Holt Cemetery in 2013 and 2014. However, the graves and tombs themselves remain in a state of significant neglect, with human remains being evident. New burials continue at Holt Cemetery, and the graves show evidence for frequent visits and various cultural materials.
