= Darling House =

Darling House may refer to:

Australia

- Darling House, Millers Point, a heritage-listed house in Sydney, New South Wales

United States

- Robert and Julia Darling House, Simsbury, Connecticut, listed on the National Register of Historic Places (NRHP)
- Darling House Museum, Woodbridge, Connecticut, NRHP-listed
- Jay Norwood and Genevieve Pendleton Darling House, Des Moines, Iowa, NRHP-listed
- Henry Darling House, Woonsocket, Rhode Island, NRHP-listed
- Frederick L. Darling House, Hudson, Wisconsin, NRHP-listed
