= Robert Hazard (EP) =

EP by Robert Hazard
- Released: June 1982
- Studio: Sigma Sound, Philadelphia, Pennsylvania
- Genre: New wave
- Length: 19:55
- Label: RHA; RCA
- Producer: Robert Hazard

Robert Hazard chronology
Robert Hazard (1982)	Wing of Fire (1984)

Professional ratings
Review scores
Source	Rating
AllMusic	4.5/5 stars
Rolling Stone	4/5 stars

Robert Hazard is the first EP (or mini-LP as it states on the sleeve) released by American musician Robert Hazard in June 1982 originally on his own record label "RHA Records" as Robert Hazard and the Heroes. After catching the attention of the music industry, Hazard signed for RCA Records who then remixed the album and released it nationally in late November 1982, along with removing the Heroes from the band name. There were two singles from the release, "Escalator of Life" and "Change Reaction", both of which charted in the US in 1983. The album also charted on the Billboard 200, peaking at #102.

== Track listing ==
All tracks are written by Robert Hazard, except "Blowin' in the Wind", written by Bob Dylan

No.	Title	Length
1.	"Escalator of Life"	4:41
2.	"Change Reaction"	3:55
3.	"(I Just Want To) Hang Around with You"	3:05
4.	"Out of the Blue"	3:47
5.	"Blowin' in the Wind"	4:27
Total length:		19:55

== Personnel ==
- Robert Hazard – lead vocals, guitar
- Michael Pilla – vocals, guitar
- John Lilley – guitar
- Bill Zitter - guitar
- Jerry Weindel – keyboards
- Rob Miller – bass
- Ken Bernard – drums

Technical

- Arthur Stoppe – engineer
- Ed Weisberg – art direction
- Robert Hakalski – photography
- Recorded at Sigma Sound Studios, Philadelphia
- Tracks 1, 2 and 4 mixed by Neil Kernon at Electric Lady Studios, New York
- Mastered by Howie Weinberg at Masterdisk, New York

== Charts ==
Chart (1983)	Peak position
US Billboard Top LPs & Tape	102
