= Escalator of Life =

1982 single by Robert Hazard

Single by Robert Hazard

from the album Robert Hazard
- B-side: "Say Yo"
- Released: 1982
- Genre: Rock; new wave
- Length: 4:41
- Label: RCA
- Songwriter(s): Robert Hazard
- Producer(s): Robert Hazard

Robert Hazard singles chronology
"Change Reaction" (1982)	"Escalator of Life" (1982)	"Hard Hearted" (1984)

Audio
- "Escalator of Life" on YouTube

Music video
- "Escalator of Life" on YouTube

"Escalator of Life" is a song from Robert Hazard's first mini-album Robert Hazard, released in 1982. The song spent 9 weeks on the Billboard Hot 100, peaking at number 58 on April 9, 1983. The song is mentioned in the books Preaching the Incarnation and Cyndi Lauper: A Memoir. The single version of the song was remixed and edited by Neil Kernon.

== Track listing ==
1. "Escalator of Life" – 3:30
2. "Say Yo" – 4:53
