= Darling Darling =

Darling Darling may refer to:

- Darling Darling (1977 film), an Indian Hindi-language film
- Darling Darling (2000 film), an Indian Malayalam-language musical comedy film
- Darling Darling (2001 film), an Indian Telugu-language musical comedy film
- Darling Darling (TV series), Indian soap opera
- Darling Darling (2005 film), a short film starring Michael Cera
- "Darling Darling" (song), a 2001 single by Hitomi Yaida
- "Darling Darling", a 2008 song by the Hellacopters from their album Head Off

== See also ==
- Darling (disambiguation)
- Darling, Darling, Darling, a 1982 Indian Tamil-language film
- "Darling Darling Darling", a 1970 song by the Meters from their album Struttin'
