= Darling Run =

Stream in Coshocton County, United States of America

Coordinates: 40°20′55.5″N 82°3′23.5″W

Darling Run is a stream in Coshocton County, in the U.S. state of Ohio.

Darling Run was named for Robert Darling, who operated a mill there.

== See also ==
- List of rivers of Ohio
