= Darlung, Gulmi =

Coordinates: 28°14′N 83°9′E

Darling, Lumbini दर्लिङ्ग
- Village Development Committee
- Interactive map of Darling, Lumbini
- Country: Nepal
- Zone: Lumbini Zone
- District: Gulmi District

Population (1991)
  - Total: 2,465
- Time zone: UTC+5:45 (Nepal Time)

Darling is a village and municipality in Gulmi District in the Lumbini Zone of central Nepal. At the time of the 1991 Nepal census it had a population of 2465 persons living in 454 individual households.
