= Darling, Arizona =

Darling, Arizona may refer to:

- Winona, Arizona, whose railroad station has been renamed Darling
- Darling Cinder Pit, a mine near Winona, Arizona
