= Michael Tearson =

American singer

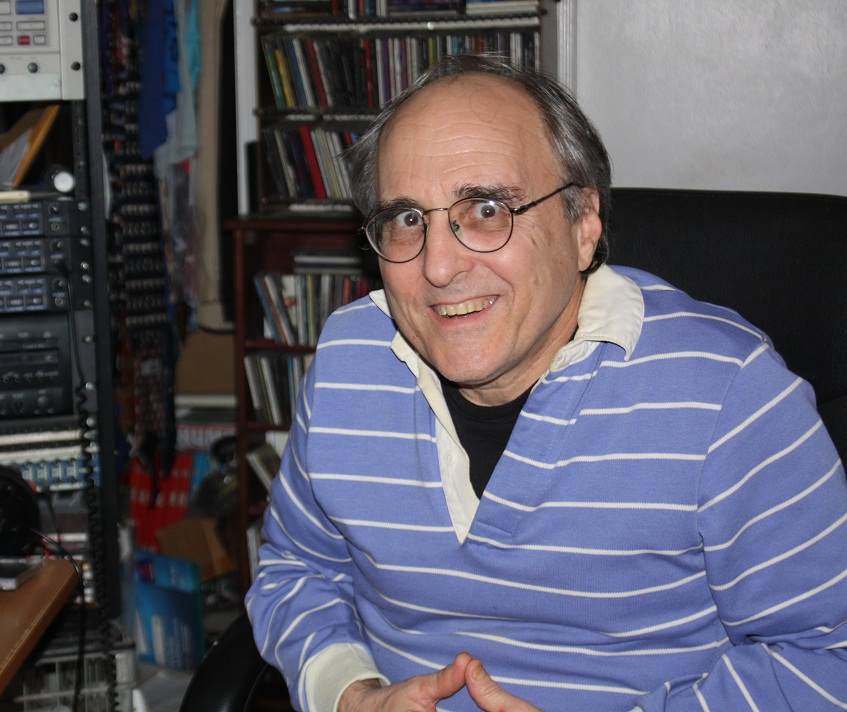
- Born: Michael Esterson; 1948 (age 77–78); Baltimore, Maryland, U.S.
- Presenting career
- Show: Iradiophilly, Philadelphia's Internet Radio Community
- Station: Plateau
- Time slot: Saturday, Sunday Shows and then each as Podcasts Monday to Monday
- Station: 102.9 WMGK Philadelphia
- Time slot: Saturday Morning Show
- Style: Disc Jockey
- Country: United States
- Previous show: Sirius/XM Deep Tracks Sirius XM Radio
- Website: www.radiothatdoesntsuck.com

Michael Tearson is an American pioneer underground DJ, concert and special appearance host, author, recording artist and actor. Inducted into the Hall of Fame, 2016, awarded by the Broadcast Pioneers of Philadelphia.

== Biography ==
During May, 1967, while home from his first year of college, Tearson went to the "15 Below Coffeehouse" to participate in the talent show. "15 Below Coffeehouse" was located in Timonium near the Maryland State Fair grounds. Before his performance, a very young Emmylou Harris, age 19, made her appearance, taking the audience by surprise with her amazing voice and talent. Not getting noticed for his own performance, Tearson realized that he needed to make a change in his goals. He befriended Emmylou Harris, beginning a lifelong friendship.

Tearson was married in August, 1990. Lynne, "the love of my lifetime” Tearson said in 2015, was diagnosed with aggressive breast cancer a year after they met, in January 1991, and died at home in 1995 at age 37. As someone who has "coped much of his life with depression [and who] doesn't believe anyone is really happy" per the report, Tearson also said, “That first year together was by far the best year of my life, a rare stretch of intoxicating happy."

== Education ==
Tearson obtained a bachelor's degree in political science in 1970 from the University of Pennsylvania. As an undergraduate Tearson had his first appearance on the air with WXPN from 1967 to 1970. This was the very first FM Rock shift on WXPN; the show was entitled "The Attic". In January 1970, Tearson joined WDAS-FM Hyski's Underground as overnighter. Tearson has been a longtime member of "Broadcast Pioneers", and he has been involved with FM radio in the United States since its infancy.

== 1970 to early 1990s ==
In June 1970, WMMR hired Tearson as a music director and weekend disc jockey. Tearson then moved into the late night personality segment in September 1970 and became a popular on air voice until 1976, reviving 'The Marconi Experiment' that had been begun at the station by Dave Herman in 1968. Tearson returned two years later to WMMR in 1978 to the 10PM to 2AM time period as “Michael Tearson”. His specialty shows including “Psychedelic Psupper”, “For Headphones Only”, “The Import Show”, "Import/Export” and “Gorilla Theatre”. Soon after leaving WMMR, in March 1992 Michael Tearson started an on-air show at WXPN in Philadelphia Pennsylvania, which included a free-form hour-long segment called “The Attic”.

== Late 1990s to early 2000s ==
During the late 1990s and early 2000s, he was very diverse in his expertise as a DJ, working to develop special programs for WMMR with the “A to Z” broadcast and also redeveloped WMMR's live concert library in the WMMarchives. Both programs are still very popular at the station. He was also involved with WXPN "Late Nights", which was a diverse and imaginative late-night mix of music. Michael Tearson's studio in his home is called “LynTown Sound”, named after his wife who died from breast cancer on May 10, 1995. The week she died Michael Tearson had an on-air interview scheduled with the band Little Feat and against the advice of many of his friends, especially Carmen Borrelli, he went on to do the show on Sunday May 14, 1995, before they appeared at Penn's Landing, in Philadelphia. Tearson is good friends with Little Feat and mentions in an interview with Geosound that they helped him through that difficult time with losing his wife. From 1994 to 1996, Michael Tearson produced and voiced “The Wall” which was an in-store radio broadcast, at one of their record store chains. In April 2002, WMGK approached Michael Tearson with an offer to produce a segment for Saturday mornings from 6AM-8AM; it was called “Saturday Morning 60s Show”.

From 1999 to 2003, Michael Tearson was adventurous; he was called Michael "Mad Dog" Tearson for a column he wrote on pro wrestling, entitled “On The Mat” for the Philadelphia Daily News. Tearson also writes for two magazines: Sing Out!, a folk song magazine, and The Audiophile Voice.

== 2000s ==
Tearson started at Sirius Radio (Sirius Folk Town) in July 2004-October 2005. He was also the main producer and voice of "The Bob Dylan Radio Hour" which aired twice on Sundays. Tearson moved to "Sirius Classic Vinyl", March 2006-November 2008 which he broadcast Monday through Friday in the afternoons. Sirius XM Radio was also interested in Michael Tearson and picked him up to work on "Deep Tracks" in November 2008.

== 2010s and beyond ==
In July, 2011 Tearson released "Stuff That Works" which was a collaboration of friends that pulled together to create music that Michael Tearson called "A Philosophy". An interview by Jonathan Takiff from philly.com on August 24, 2011, captures the enthusiasm of this project that was a dream come true for Tearson. Tearson was also interviewed by Jim Six from South Jersey Newspapers. He tells Six “The ... CD 'Stuff That Works' is named after a Guy Clark song that isn't even on the album.” Tearson mentions all who contributed to the CD, which are Tom Hampton, Andy Kravitz, Fran Smith Jr. and Rob Hyman of The Hooters, Ted Estersohn, Jay Davidson, Laine Walker Hughes and Lauren Hart. An appearance opening for Chris Smither to support the Stuff album was to be the first time Tearson performed music in public since he sang and accompanied himself on the guitar at the Rathskeller at Swarthmore College in 1971.

On October 9, 2011, Kevin Riordan of the Inquirer writes about Tearson's Stuff That Works CD release. He interviewed Michael at his home studio, discussing the songs that are on the CD. Michael had said "The best compliment I've gotten about my album, is that different people pick wildly different songs as their favorite."

Since April 2002, Tearson produced the weekly 1960s-themed morning show for WMGK, using his expertise and knowledge of pop rock, psychedelic rock, blues rock and folk rock, all which can be found in Tearson's private record library, located at LynTown Sound Studio. On January 15, 2013, WMGK canceled the show.

At iRadioPhilly in April 2013, Tearson was planning another revival of 'The Marconi Experiment' and "conducted a nostalgic phone interview" with his 1968-70 predecessor on the show, Dave Herman. Six months later, Herman was arrested on federal charges of soliciting sex with a 6-year-old girl. In May 2014, while held in a Newark, NJ, jail to await trial, Herman, 78, died of an aneurysm. "It was massively disturbing and shocking," Tearson said of the allegations. "It just did not compute with the man I knew."

On July 20, 2015, Tearson announced he had departed Sirius/XM Radio after 12 years on the air, soured by corporate tinkering with his program.

Tearson was working with George Manney at Philly Pop Music as the narrator and executive producer for Manney's documentary on Philadelphia's diversified musical community. The project is on hold following the death of Manney in December 2015. At

Tearson also continues to contribute to Radio That Doesn't Suck and at iRadioPhilly, Philadelphia's Internet Radio Community on the Plateau channel.

== Discography ==
- July 2011, Michael Tearson released first CD, "Stuff That Works".
  - Produced and engineered by Andy Kravitz at Sound and Vision Music Productions, Collingswood, NJ.
  - Co-Produced by Michael Tearson and Tom Hampton
- October 2013, "Ruby's Greatest Hit"

== Filmography ==
Year	Movie-Documentary	Role	Notes
1981	Blow Out	Hawker	Motion Picture
1994	Home of Angels	Younger Fisherman	Motion Picture
2002	13th Child	Mental Patient	Motion Picture
