= Boneghazi =

2015 internet controversy

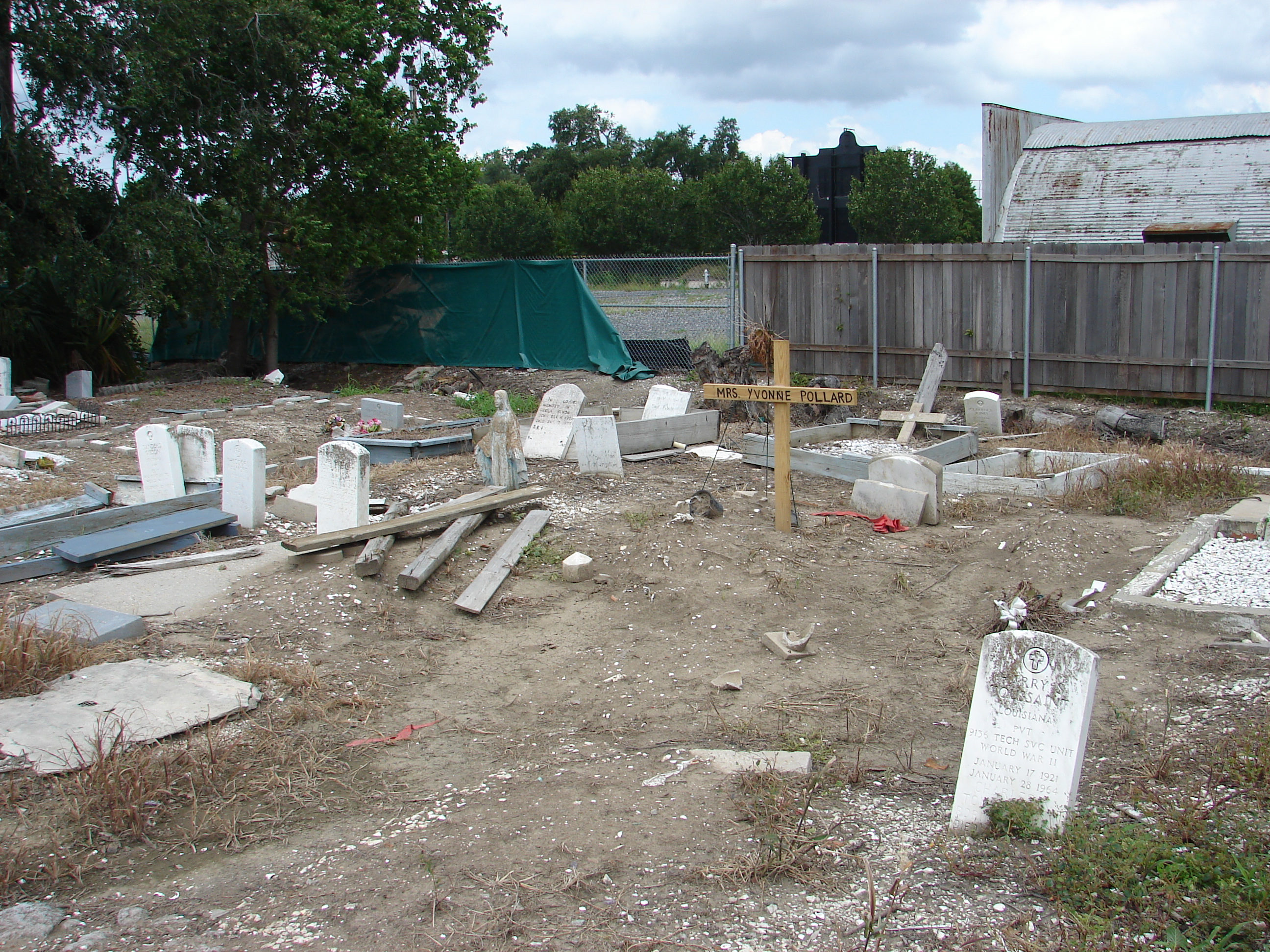
Holt Cemetery, seen in a state of disrepair in 2008

Boneghazi or bones discourse was a controversy that occurred on Facebook and Tumblr from 2015 to 2016 concerning Ender Darling (born 1990 or 1991), a self-identified witch who took human bones from a cemetery in New Orleans for use in rituals. Darling posted to the Facebook group Queer Witch Collective in December 2015, saying they (Note: Darling uses they/them pronouns.) had been collecting bones for use in witchcraft from a "poor man's graveyard" where bones often rose to the surface, and offering to sell bones to others for the cost of shipping. Some fellow witches accused Darling of desecrating graves and took issue with the bones' apparent source, Holt Cemetery—a potter's field where most burials are of poor people of color. Screenshots of the argument were posted elsewhere on Facebook, making their way to local news and then to Tumblr, where one user made a call-out post that garnered over 31,000 notes and led to discourse about racism and classism. Meta-commentary on Tumblr included both humorous memes and criticism of the discourse's focus on identity politics.

== History ==
In 2015, feminist witchcraft was experiencing a surge in popularity among youth in the LGBTQ community; according to reporting from Vice, the spike stemmed from witchcraft representing "a powerful identity that celebrates the freedom to choose who you are". The Queer Witch Collective, a Facebook group that had over 2,000 members at its peak, is one such gathering of witches. In order to protect practitioners of African-derived witchcraft traditions, sometimes (controversially) referred to as black magic, the group prohibited users from shaming particular witchcraft practices.

On December 8, 2015, Ender Darling, a 24- or 25-year-old witch living in New Orleans, Louisiana, posted to the Queer Witch Collective that they had been gathering human bones "for curse work and general spells that require bone", as they found them preferable to animal bones. Darling said that the bones came from a "poor man's graveyard" where bones often rose to the surface when it rained. Much of New Orleans is below sea level, so this risk is usually mitigated by above-ground entombment, but many who cannot afford it are interred below-ground instead. Darling offered to sell bones from the graveyard to other group members for the cost of shipping. They said that all bones they took were above ground when they found them and that they gathered them as part of a pact with their personal goddess: "She provides the bones if I only take what the earth gives, and I leave offerings" of drink, honey, and flowers.

At first, members reacted positively, although some had concerns about the legality of Darling's actions. Soon, however, some members began accusing Darling of disturbing the dead or desecrating graves. Darling justified their actions by claiming that they had only taken bones that were already aboveground, and that they cared more about Holt Cemetery's dead than most New Orleanians, given the cemetery's disheveled state. The group's moderators defended Darling—who, while white-passing, is described by Vice as a "witch of color"—under their anti-shaming rule. One member identified the unnamed graveyard as likely being Holt Cemetery, a potter's field for the indigent—which Darling initially denied—but Darling's critics argued that the bones they were collecting were disproportionately of poor, non-white people. One user wrote, "you are implementing white supremacist and colonialist tactics to do your bidding". The moderators attempted to foster discussion of the racial aspects of the dispute, but some users still left the group in disgust.

On December 12, a New Orleanian shared a screenshot of the post on her Facebook, which called Darling a "little shithead" and a "fucking cultural vulture" and warned them to "stay the fuck out of Holt Cemetery or [their] bones might get broken". The post made its way around social media, and local news outlets began to pick up the story. On December 17, a Tumblr user made a call-out post accusing Darling's Tumblr blog, littlefuckinmonster, of bone-stealing; then, another user publicized screenshots of the Facebook thread, noting that littlefuckinmonster's profile picture was of Darling, the same picture used on their Facebook account. The call-out post had received over 31,000 notes (engagements, including reposts and likes) by the next morning.

"Bone theft is a most heinous act. Hear me, bone wytch, and know that you are forever cursed.

"So say I, the fae of femurs, the imp of iliums, the sylph of skulls, the pixie of pelvises, the skeleton fairy."

— Tumblr user The Skeleton Fairy

Boneghazi quickly became the subject of memes, many reflecting on the situation's absurdity. One meme said "You wouldn't steal a cemetery", referencing the anti-piracy advertisement "You Wouldn't Steal a Car". One user wrote, "Out of all the Tumblr rumors, I can't believe literal grave robbery is the one that's true". Another post contrasted a call-out post over "literally stealing human bones" with the "99% of Tumblr callout posts" seeking to doxx people over non-issues such as "draw[ing] my favorite character wrong". One Tumblr user publicly cursed Darling. Another contacted the police. By the next day, state authorities said they had begun investigating.

The littlefuckinmonster blog was deactivated, but a new account, fuckinheathen, also claiming to be Darling, made a lengthy post titled "No I am not digging up fucking graves jfc". They said that they had begun collecting bones after seeing an old man dig up plots with a shovel and a backhoe, scattering bones onto the street.

The controversy was covered in BuzzFeed News and Intelligencer on December 18, the latter characterizing Tumblr users' responses as "either outraged or amused". The name "Bonegate" emerged, later supplanted by "Boneghazi"; the suffix -ghazi, derived from the 2012 attack in Benghazi, Libya, denotes an overblown or unimportant scandal.

== Legal proceedings ==
The office of the Attorney General of Louisiana began investigating Darling in mid-December based on Darling's Facebook post and images they sent to customers indicating that Holt Cemetery was the source of the bones. Investigators surveilled Darling's home for just under a week in January 2016, and subpoenaed all correspondence from their Facebook account. They received more than 12,000 pages of information in response. After the surveillance, agents searched the home on January 28, seizing 11 bones and 4 teeth. Darling was not charged immediately, but they and their roommates did receive summonses for possession of marijuana, an illegal drug at the time. Darling said of the seized bones, in an interview with The New Orleans Advocate:

I had them on an altar ... It was just a bunch of little shards of bones and pieces of teeth I had picked up off the ground. I said [to the agents], "Here you go. There's probably human bones in there, but I know better than to give you that answer."

In the same interview, Darling called the search a "waste of time" and criticized the conditions of graveyards like Holt Cemetery, saying "I'm sorry I care more than you [New Orleanians] care about your dead". Some detractors expressed joy at the news of the raid, with one Facebook user writing "I hope their life is utterly destroyed". Others emphasized the context of gentrification in New Orleans in the wake of Hurricane Katrina. A friend defended Darling as having been targeted by a modern witch hunt for their beliefs, ethnicity, gender, sexual orientation, and appearance. She told The Washington Post, "Everything about [Darling's] identity questions the status quo, and that's what we love about them".

Amidst the online controversy, Darling left New Orleans for fear of their daughter's safety. On July 15, Darling was arrested in Tampa, Florida, after laboratory testing confirmed that the remains were human. They were extradited back to New Orleans two weeks later and jailed on charges of burglary and trafficking in human parts, with a bond set to $8,500 (equivalent to $11,403 in 2025). On September 9, they pled guilty to burglary from Holt Cemetery and marijuana possession, receiving a five-year suspended sentence for the former and 15 days in prison with credit for time served, meaning that they were released immediately.

== Reaction and impact ==
Alex Mar, the author of the book Witches of America, concluded based on discussions with witches in New Orleans that Darling was inexperienced with witchcraft. She said that while Darling's practice of witchcraft may have stemmed from an interest in African diaspora religions like Palo, it was not consistent with that religion's practices, nor was Darling's taking of strangers' bones consistent with any tradition Mar knew of.

"We have reached Peak Tumblr. A callout post was made for someone literally stealing human bones and offering to sell them, with attached commentary about racism and classism. A Your Fave Is Problematicesque discussion, made in lieu of contacting the authorities. The post offering the bones had content warnings at the top. It is the end of 2015 and Tumblr has become what it was always destined to be."

— Tumblr user vikingspacebees

Many Tumblr users reacted positively to the memes about Boneghazi, with one writing that it ended the "meme drought" Tumblr had been experiencing at the time. Others criticized the discourse around the incident, deriding the fact that Tumblr users' reaction to bone-stealing was a call-out post and discourse about race and class. One blogger called it "peak Tumblr". Diana Tourjée echoed that analysis in Vice, writing that Tumblr and the Queer Witch Collective both had a tendency to analyze every issue with discourse and identity politics.

Darling left the Queer Witch Collective shortly after the controversy began, but the aftermath badly damaged the group. In an apology post, the group's founder said that they (Note: The group's founder uses they/them pronouns.) had never agreed with Darling but that they had perceived "a [person of color] being attacked for their practice, even if it’s something I did not understand or would never do myself." They left the group after criticism of their actions continued. A new moderation team suggested that white witches stop participating in the discourse, and eventually removed everyone from the group except for themselves, requiring an application to re-join. As of 2016, there were only 77 members left in the Queer Witch Collective.

According to Cassandra McKenney et al. in The Routledge Handbook of Archaeology and the Media in the 21st Century, Boneghazi originated the archetype of "the Bone Collecting Witch", one propagated largely by people who share its stereotypical demographics—white, Millennial, usually feminine-presenting, interested in witchcraft, and rebellious. The concept originated in Tumblr's Witchblr community and then spread to Instagram and TikTok after the mass exodus of Tumblr users in 2018. Boneghazi received renewed interest in 2021, amidst a separate controversy concerning a TikToker with a large collection of bones. TikTokers, many of whom had migrated from Tumblr, made explicit reference to "Boneghazi"; Shawn Graham et al. in Open Archaeology highlight use of the #boneghazi hashtag, alongside #controversy, #anthropology, and #history, as self-aware meta-commentary.

=== Louisiana Human Remains Protection and Control Act ===
Louisiana Human Remains Protection and Control Act

Louisiana State Legislature
- Long title: An Act to enact Chapter 21-C of Title 25 of the Louisiana Revised Statutes of 1950, to be comprised of R.S. 25:951 through 959, relative to the Louisiana Human Remains Protection and Control Act; to provide relative to the control and management of human remains; to provide relative to legislative intent; to provide definitions; to provide penalties; to provide exemptions; to provide relative to enforcement; and to provide for related matters.
- Citation: La. R.S. 25:951–959
- Passed by: Louisiana State Senate
- Passed: April 7, 2016
- Passed by: Louisiana House of Representatives
- Passed: June 3, 2016
- Signed: June 17, 2016

In parallel to the criminal investigation of Darling, the Louisiana State Legislature responded to Boneghazi with the Louisiana Human Remains Protection and Control Act (LHRPCA), introduced by Senator Neil Riser in March 2016 and signed into law by the governor on June 17. Removing human remains from a cemetery was already illegal under state law, but the new law clarified the relevant definitions, contained stronger penalties for violating the law, and found that "Louisiana law has never permitted, recognized, or sanctioned ownership rights in human remains". This made Louisiana the third state to broadly ban the import and export of human remains.

The act designated the attorney general, who is the ex officio attorney for the Louisiana Cemetery Board, as the party responsible for enforcing human remains laws. A 2016 investigation by the Louisiana Department of Justice led eBay to ban most listings for human remains. A further act of the legislature in 2020 gave the department a role in protecting and reinterring remains that have surfaced due to weather. In a 2024 article in the Tulsa Law Review, Cameron Skinner argues for using the LHRPCA as a framework for federal regulation of the trade in human remains.

== See also ==
- Online shaming
- Witch hunt
