= Frederick L. Darling House =

Historic house in Wisconsin, United States

- U.S. National Register of Historic Places
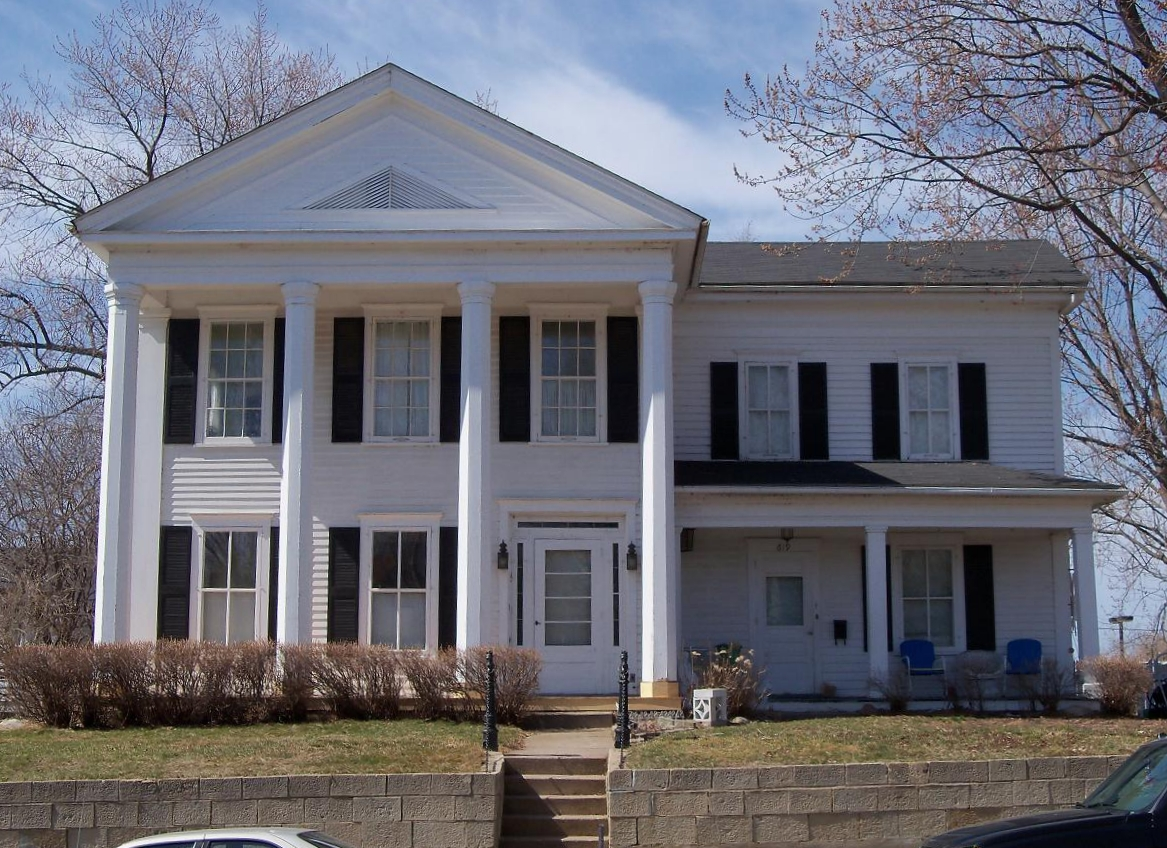

- Location within Wisconsin Location within the United States
- Location: 617 3rd Street; Hudson, Wisconsin
- Coordinates: 44°58′36″N 92°45′20″W
- Area: less than one acre
- Built: 1857
- Architect: Ammah & Amasa Andrews
- Architectural style: Greek Revival
- MPS: Hudson and North Hudson MRA
- NRHP reference No.: 84000060
- Added to NRHP: October 4, 1984

The Frederick L. Darling House is a historic house located at 617 Third Street in Hudson, Wisconsin.

The two-story, Greek Revival style house was built in 1857 by Amasa and Ammah Andrews. It was added to the National Register of Historic Places on October 4, 1984.

It is a two-story L-shaped building on a stone foundation. It has a pedimented gable portico supported by four octagonal columns on its east side.

It has also been known as Darling-O'Brien House.
