= Darling (Robert Hazard album) =

Studio album by Robert Hazard
- Released: November 1986
- Genre: New wave
- Length: 37:08
- Label: RHA
- Producers: David Bianco; Robert Hazard

Robert Hazard chronology
Wing of Fire (1984)	Darling (1986)	Howl (1998)

Darling is the second album by American musician Robert Hazard, released in November 1986 on his own label RHA Records, after being dropped by RCA in 1984. "Hip Pocket" was recorded in California with Rod Stewart's band.

== Track listing ==
All tracks are written by Robert Hazard.

No.	Title	Length
1.	"Darling"	3:44
2.	"Hip Pocket"	4:09
3.	"Be My Girl"	3:22
4.	"Little Brother"	4:26
5.	"Hollywood"	5:07
6.	"Hard Hearted"	3:10
7.	"All My Kisses"	3:30
8.	"Too Tough to Love"	4:26
9.	"Fever"	5:14
Total length:		37:08

== Personnel ==
Musicians

- Robert Hazard – lead vocals, background vocals, guitar
- Michael Pilla – guitar, background vocals
- Lou Franco – guitar
- Joe McGinty – keyboards, piano
- Bill (Will) Robinson – bass guitar, Upright Bass, keyboard bass, backing vocals
- Michael Radcliffe – bass guitar
- Ed Kamarauskas – drums
- Bill Zitter – guitar
- Peter Cline – guitar
- Doug Grigsby – bass guitar
- Alan James – guitar
- Anthony Ricco – drums
- Rob Sande – keyboards
- Tony Santoro – guitar
- Jimmy Stout – guitar
- Fred Wackenhut – keyboards
- Jay Williams – guitar
- David Bianco – backing vocals
- Jay Davis – bass guitar (track 2)
- Kevin Savigar – keyboards (track 2)
- Tony Brock – drums (track 2)

Technical

- David Bianco – engineer, mixer, producer
- Randy Cantor – programming
