= V6 discography =

- Studio albums: 14
- EPs: 2
- Compilation albums: 4
- Singles: 53
- Video albums: 22

Japanese boy band V6 has released fourteen studio albums, four compilation albums, two extended plays, 53 singles and 22 video albums.

== Albums ==
=== Studio albums ===
List of studio albums, with selected chart positions and certifications
Title	Details	Peak positions			Certifications
Title	Details	JPN (Note: Sources for chart positions are as follows: Musicmind, Voyager, Ready?, Oh! My! Goodness!, The Ones.)	TWN (Note: The G-Music Combo chart was established in July 2005 and ran until April 2015. Sources for chart positions are as follows: Musicmind, Ready, Oh! My! Goodness!, Super Best II.)	TWN EA (Note: The G-Music J-Pop chart was established in July 2005 and only archives the top 20 releases. Sources for chart positions are as follows: Musicmind, Voyager, Ready, Oh! My! Goodness! Very Best II, Super Very Best.)	Certifications
Since 1995 – Forever	Released: August 5, 1996; Label: Avex Trax; Format: CD	1	—	—	RIAJ: Gold
Nature Rhythm	Released: August 13, 1997; Label: Avex Trax; Format: CD	2	—	—	RIAJ: Platinum
A Jack in the Box	Released: August 5, 1998; Label: Avex Trax; Format: CD	2	—	—	RIAJ: Gold
"Lucky" 20th Century, Coming Century to Be Continued...	Released: August 18, 1999; Label: Avex Trax; Format: CD	1	—	—	RIAJ: Gold
"Happy" Coming Century, 20th Century Forever	Released: August 9, 2000; Label: Avex Trax; Format: CD	1	—	—	RIAJ: Gold
Volume 6	Released: August 1, 2001; Label: Avex Trax; Format: CD	1	—	—	RIAJ: Gold
Seven	Released: July 31, 2002; Label: Avex Trax; Format: CD	3	—	—	
Infinity: Love & Life	Released: August 6, 2003; Label: Avex Trax; Format: CD	1	—	—	RIAJ: Gold
Musicmind	Released: November 1, 2005; Label: Avex Trax; Format: CD, CD+DVD	2	10	1	RIAJ: Gold
Voyager	Released: September 12, 2007; Label: Avex Trax; Format: CD, CD+DVD	1	—	2	RIAJ: Gold
Ready?	Released: March 31, 2010; Label: Avex Trax; Format: CD, CD+DVD	2	4	2	RIAJ: Gold
Oh! My! Goodness!	Released: February 2, 2013; Label: Avex Trax; Format: CD, CD+DVD	2	20	5	
The Ones	Released: August 9, 2017; Label: Avex Trax; Format: CD, CD+DVD, CD+Blu-ray	1	—	—	RIAJ: Gold
Step	Released: September 4, 2021; Label: Avex Trax; Format: CD, CD+DVD, CD+Blu-ray	1	—	—	RIAJ: Gold

=== Compilation albums ===
List of compilation albums, with selected chart positions and certifications
Title	Details	Peak positions			Certifications
Title	Details	JPN	TWN	TWN EA	Certifications
Very Best	Released: January 1, 2001; Label: Avex Trax; Format: CD	1	—	—	RIAJ: Platinum
Very Best II	Released: August 2, 2006; Label: Avex Trax; Format: CD	1	11	3	RIAJ: Gold
Super Very Best	Released: July 29, 2015; Label: Avex Trax; Format: CD, CD+DVD	1	—	2	RIAJ: Platinum
Very6 Best	Released: October 26, 2021; Label: Avex Trax; Format: CD, CD+DVD, CD+Blu-ray	1	—	—	RIAJ: Gold

== Extended plays ==
List of extended plays, with selected chart positions and certifications
Title	Details	Peak	Certifications
Title	Details	JPN	Certifications
Greeting	Released: December 2, 1996; Label: Avex Trax; Format: CD	1	RIAJ: Gold
Super Heroes	Released: February 11, 1998; Label: Avex Trax; Format: CD	1	RIAJ: Gold

== Singles ==
List of singles, with selected chart positions and certifications, showing year released and album name
Title	Year	Peak positions			Certifications	Album
Title	Year	JPN	JPN Hot. (Note: Sources for chart positions are as follows: "Cho", "Light In Your Heart", "Spirit", "Guilty", "Only Dreaming", "Sexy Honey Bunny", "Bari Bari Buddy", "Keep On", "Rock Your Soul", "Kimi ga Omoidasu Boku wa Kimi o Aishite Iru Darou ka", "Namida no Ato ga Kieru Koro", "Sky's The Limit", "Timeless", "Beautiful World", "Can't Get Enough", "Colors", "Crazy Rays", "Super Powers", "Aru Hi Negai ga Kanattanda" / "All For You", "It's My Life", "Bokura wa Mada".)	TWN EA (Note: The G-Music J-Pop chart was established in July 2005 and only archives the top 20 releases. Sources for chart positions are as follows: "Orange", "Good Day!!" 2018 Week 11, "Way of Life", "Cho", "Spirit" 2016, week 9, "Guilty", "Only Dreaming / Catch", "Sexy Honey Bunny" 2016 Week 12, "Keep On", "Rock Your Soul", "Timeless".)	Certifications	Album
"Music for the People"	1995	3	—	—	RIAJ: Platinum	Since 1995 – Forever
"Made in Japan"	1996	1	—	—	RIAJ: Platinum	Since 1995 – Forever
"Beat Your Heart"	1996	1	—	—	RIAJ: Gold	Since 1995 – Forever
"Take Me Higher"	1996	1	—	—	RIAJ: Gold	Nature Rhythm
"Ai Nanda"	1997	1	—	—	RIAJ: Platinum	Nature Rhythm
"Honki ga Ippai"	1997	1	—	—	RIAJ: Platinum	Nature Rhythm
"Wa ni Natte Odorou"	1997	2	—	—	RIAJ: Platinum	Nature Rhythm
"Generation Gap"	1997	1	—	—	RIAJ: Platinum	A Jack in the Box
"Be Yourself"	1998	1	—	—	RIAJ: Platinum	A Jack in the Box
"Tsubasa ni Nare"	1998	3	—	—	RIAJ: Gold	A Jack in the Box
"Over"	1998	1	—	—	RIAJ: Platinum	"Lucky" 20th Century, Coming; Century to be Continued...
"Easy Show Time"	1998	1	—	—	RIAJ: Platinum	"Lucky" 20th Century, Coming; Century to be Continued...
"Believe Your Smile"	1999	1	—	—	RIAJ: Gold	"Lucky" 20th Century, Coming; Century to be Continued...
"Jiyu de Aru Tame ni"	1999	2	—	—	RIAJ: Gold	"Lucky" 20th Century, Coming; Century to be Continued...
"Taiyo no Ataru Basho"	1999	3	—	—	RIAJ: Gold	"Happy" Coming Century, 20th Century Forever
"Yasei no Hana"	2000	3	—	—	RIAJ: Gold	"Happy" Coming Century, 20th Century Forever
"Life Goes On"	2000	3	—	—	RIAJ: Gold	"Happy" Coming Century, 20th Century Forever
"My Days"	2000	3	—	—	RIAJ: Gold	Non-album single
"In the Wind"	2000	2	—	—	RIAJ: Gold	"Happy" Coming Century, 20th Century Forever
"Change the World"	2000	3	—	—	RIAJ: Gold	Volume 6
"Ai no Melody"	2001	3	—	—	RIAJ: Gold	Volume 6
"Kiseki no Hajimari"	2001	3	—	—	RIAJ: Gold	Volume 6
"Shodo"	2001	3	—	—	RIAJ: Gold	Volume 6
"Dasenai Tegami"	2001	1	—	—	RIAJ: Gold	Seven
"Feel Your Breeze"	2002	1	—	—	RIAJ: Gold	Seven
"One" (featuring S.E.S. Shoo)	2002	1	—	—	RIAJ: Gold	Seven
"Mejirushi no Kioku"	2003	4	—	—	RIAJ: Gold	Infinity: Love & Life
"Darling"	2003	1	—	—	RIAJ: Platinum	Infinity: Love & Life
"Cosmic Rescue"	2003	1	—	—	RIAJ: Gold	Infinity: Love & Life
"Tsuyoku Nare"	2003	1	—	—	RIAJ: Gold	Infinity: Love & Life
"Arigato no Uta"	2004	1	—	—	RIAJ: Gold	Musicmind
"Thunderbird (Your Voice)"	2004	2	—	—	RIAJ: Gold	Musicmind
"Utao-Utao"	2005	1	—	—		Musicmind
"Orange"	2005	1	—	20		Musicmind
"Good Day!!"	2006	1	—	18		Voyager
"Honey Beat"	2007	1	—	—		Voyager
"Boku to Bokura no Ashita"	2007	1	—	—		Voyager
"Jasmine"	2007	1	—	—		Voyager
"Rainbow"	2007	1	—	—		Voyager
"Way of Life"	2007	1	—	7	RIAJ: Gold	Ready?
"Cho"	2008	2	3	18		Ready?
"Light in Your Heart"	2008	1	2	—		Ready?
"Swing!"	2008	1	—	—		Ready?
"Spirit"	2009	1	1	11	RIAJ: Gold	Ready?
"Guilty"	2009	1	2	14		Ready?
"Only Dreaming"	2010	1	3	9		Oh! My! Goodness!
"Catch"	2010	1	—	9		Non-album single
"Sexy Honey Bunny!"	2011	2	2	11		Oh! My! Goodness!
"Takara no Ishi"	2011	2	—	11		Non-album single
"Bari Bari Buddy!"	2012	2	3	—		Oh! My! Goodness!
"Keep On"	2012	3	4	9		Oh! My! Goodness!
"Rock Your Soul"	2012	1	29	8		Oh! My! Goodness!
"Kimi ga Omoidasu Boku wa Kimi o Aishite Iru Darou ka"	2013	3	3	—		Super Very Best
"Namida no Ato ga Kieru Koro"	2014	2	2	—		Super Very Best
"Sky's the Limit"	2014	1	1	—		Super Very Best
"Timeless"	2015	1	1	4	RIAJ: Gold	Super Very Best
"Beautiful World"	2016	1	1	—	RIAJ: Gold	The Ones
"Can't Get Enough"	2017	2	2	—	RIAJ: Gold	The Ones
"Hana Hirake"	2017	2	—	—	RIAJ: Gold	Non-album single
"Colors"	2017	1	1	—	RIAJ: Gold	The Ones
"Taiyo to Tsuki no Kodomotachi"	2017	1	—	—	RIAJ: Gold	Non-album single
"Crazy Rays"	2018	2	3	—	RIAJ: Gold	Very6 Best
"Keep Going"	2018	2	—	—	RIAJ: Gold	Very6 Best
"Super Powers"	2019	1	2	—	RIAJ: Gold	Very6 Best
"Right Now"	2019	1	—	—	RIAJ: Gold	Very6 Best
"Aru Hi Negai ga Kanattanda"	2019	1	3	—	RIAJ: Gold	Very6 Best
"All for You"	2019	1	54	—	RIAJ: Gold	Very6 Best
"It's My Life"	2020	1	2	—	RIAJ: Gold	Very6 Best
"Pineapple"	2020	1	—	—	RIAJ: Gold	Very6 Best
"Bokura wa Mada"	2021	1	3	—	RIAJ: Gold	Very6 Best
"Magic Carpet Ride"	2021	1	—	—	RIAJ: Gold	Very6 Best

=== DVD singles ===
List of singles, with selected chart positions
Title	Year	Peak	Album
Title	Year	JPN	Album
"Vibes"	2008	1	Non-album single

== 20th Century discography ==
=== Studio albums ===
List of studio albums, with selected chart positions
Title	Details	Peak
Title	Details	JPN
Road	Released: September 10, 1997; Label: Avex Trax; Format: CD	4
!: Attention	Released: September 30, 1998; Label: Avex Trax; Format: CD	7

=== Compilation albums ===
List of studio albums, with selected chart positions
Title	Details	Peak
Title	Details	JPN
Replay: Best of 20th Century	Released: February 4, 2004; Label: Avex Trax; Format: CD	3

=== Singles ===
List of singles, with selected chart positions, showing year released and album name
Title	Year	Peak	Album
Title	Year	JPN	Album
"Wishes (I'll Be There)"	1999	10	Replay: Best of 20th Century
"You'll Be in My Heart" (Marsa Sakamoto)	1999	10	Very Best
"Precious Love"	2000	9	Replay: Best of 20th Century
"Ore Janakya, Kimi Janakya"	2008	1	Non-album single

== Coming Century discography ==
=== Compilation albums ===
List of studio albums, with selected chart positions and certifications
Title	Details	Peak	Certifications
Title	Details	JPN	Certifications
Best of Coming Century: Together	Released: December 11, 2002; Label: Avex Trax; Format: CD	6	RIAJ: Gold

=== Extended plays ===
List of studio albums, with selected chart positions
Title	Details	Peak
Title	Details	JPN
Hello-Goodbye	Released: July 29, 2009; Label: Avex Trax; Format: CD, CD+DVD	1

=== Singles ===
List of singles, with selected chart positions, showing year released and album name
Title	Year	Peak	Album
Title	Year	JPN	Album
"Natsu no Kakera"	1998	2	Best of Coming Century: Together
"Get Set...Go!" (MyMiCen)	2001	5	Non-album singles
"Moero Aka Shouga" (MyMiCen)	2001	5	Non-album singles
"Nani ga Nandemo" (MyMiCen)	2001	5	Non-album singles
