= The Darling =

The Darling may refer to:

- "The Darling" (short story), a 1899 short story by Anton Chekhov
- The Darling (novel), a 2005 novel by Russell Banks
- The Darlings, a fictional family of musicians on sitcom The Andy Griffith Show
- Les biches, a ballet also known as The Darlings

== See also ==
- Darling (disambiguation)
- The Little Darlings (disambiguation)
