= Wing of Fire =

Studio album by Robert Hazard
- Released: January 1984
- Recorded: 1983
- Studio: Record Plant, Los Angeles
- Genre: New wave
- Length: 44:51
- Label: RCA
- Producer: David Kershenbaum

Robert Hazard chronology
Robert Hazard (1982)	Wing of Fire (1984)	Darling (1986)

Professional ratings
Review scores
Source	Rating
AllMusic	3/5 stars

Wing of Fire is the first full-length album by American musician Robert Hazard, released in 1984 by RCA Records. It was released two years after his successful EP Robert Hazard. "Hard Hearted" was the only single from the album, and was released only in Canada. The album's sales and performance suffered due to too much management involvement, and after only selling 89,000 copies of the album, RCA dropped Hazard.

== Critical reception ==
Trouser Press called Wing of Fire "a passable album, kind of Tom Petty-meets-Willy DeVille."

== Track listing ==
All tracks are written by Robert Hazard

No.	Title	Length
1.	"Hard Hearted"	3:05
2.	"Interplanetary Private"	5:28
3.	"Fire on Fire"	4:48
4.	"Undercover Lover"	4:22
5.	"The Cool Life"	4:26
6.	"She's Hot"	4:10
7.	"If We Can't Make It"	4:35
8.	"Melt Down"	4:11
9.	"Arms of Love"	5:10
10.	"Miami Beach"	4:36
Total length:		44:51

== Personnel ==
Musicians

- Robert Hazard – lead vocals, backing vocals, guitar
- Amelia Marie Jessie, Ziva Hertziliah Serkin – backing vocals
- David Woodford – baritone, tenor and alto saxophone (tracks 3 and 7)
- Michael Radcliffe – bass guitar
- Michael Pilla – guitar
- Ken Bernard – drums, electronic drums
- Jerry Weindel – keyboards
- Peter Smith – guitar
- Kae Williams Jr. – keyboards, bass synthesizer
- Gary Chang – synthesizer
- Paulinho da Costa – percussion

Technical

- David Bianco – engineer
- Jim Scott – assistant engineer
- Robert Hakalski – cover photography
- J.J. Stelmach – cover art
- Karen McKelvie, Steve Julty – inner sleeve photography
- Recorded and mixed at Record Plant, Los Angeles
- Mastered at Sterling Sound, New York
