= Robert Hazard =

American singer-songwriter (1948–2008)

Background information
- Born: Robert Rimato; August 21, 1948; Philadelphia, Pennsylvania, U.S.
- Died: August 5, 2008 (aged 59) Boston, Massachusetts, U.S.
- Genre: New wave
- Labels: RHA; RCA

Robert Hazard (né Rimato; August 21, 1948 – August 5, 2008) was an American rock musician from Philadelphia.

== Early life ==
Robert Hazard was born Robert Rimato to an Italian family in Philadelphia, the son of an opera singer who was a tenor for the Philadelphia Opera Company and also owned a jewelry shop. He grew up in Springfield Township, Pennsylvania, and graduated from Springfield High School in 1966. His older sister introduced him to some of his greatest influences such as Elvis Presley, Gene Vincent and Carl Perkins.

== Career ==
Kurt Loder profiled him in a 1981 Rolling Stone article, describing Hazard as a musician "...who started out as a Dylan-era folkie, then spent eight years singing country & western. 'I just love country music', he explains, which of course explains nothing, least of all the two years he subsequently spent with a reggae band... or his current electro-pop approach, which owes little to any of the above."

He wrote, composed, and recorded (as a demo) the song "Girls Just Want to Have Fun" in 1979, which was recorded in 1983 by Cyndi Lauper who turned it into a best-selling hit. He also composed the new-wave and MTV songs "Escalator of Life" and "Change Reaction", which he performed with his band, Robert Hazard and the Heroes, that was popular in the Philadelphia club scene during the 1980s. These songs appeared on the five-song extended player Robert Hazard, released in June 1982 by his own record label "RHA Records", and the next November by major label RCA Records. RCA released his first LP album, Wing of Fire, in January 1984.

Hazard claimed he finally earned $1 million in royalties from "Girls Just Want to Have Fun" in the 1990s. His final recordings were country albums, beginning with The Seventh Lake (2003) and continuing with Blue Mountain (2004). In 2007, Rykodisc signed Hazard and released his album, Troubadour.

== Death ==
Hazard died at the age of 59 at Massachusetts General Hospital in Boston on August 5, 2008, following surgery for pancreatic cancer with which he had recently been diagnosed. He had been living with his wife, Susan Selander, and two sons near Old Forge, New York, where they ran an antique shop. He also had a daughter from a previous marriage.

== Discography ==
=== Studio albums ===
- Wing of Fire (1984)
- Darling (1986)
- Howl (1998)
- The Seventh Lake (2004)
- Blue Mountain (2004)
- Troubadour (2007)

=== Extended plays ===
- Robert Hazard (1982) – No. 102 (Billboard 200)

=== Compilation albums ===
- Out of the Blue (as Robert Hazard and the Heroes) (2005)

=== Singles ===
- "Escalator of Life" (1982) – No. 58 (Billboard Top 100)
- "Change Reaction" (1982) – No. 106 (Bubbling Under Hot 100)
- "Hard Hearted" (1984)
